= NCAA Division I men's basketball tournament =

American collegiate men's basketball tournament

- Most recent season or competition: 2026 NCAA Division I men's basketball tournament
- Sport: College basketball
- Founded: 1939; 87 years ago
- First season: 1939
- Organizing body: NCAA
- No. of teams: 76
- Country: United States
- Most recent champion: Michigan (2nd title) (2026)
- Most titles: UCLA (11)
- Broadcasters: NCAA March Madness; (CBS/TBS/TNT/TruTV); CBS Sports Network (re-airs); Galavisión (Spanish-language coverage)
- Streaming partners: Paramount+ HBO Max
- Website: ncaa.com/basketball

The NCAA Division I men's basketball tournament, branded as March Madness, or The Big Dance, is a single-elimination tournament played in the United States to determine the men's college basketball national champion of the Division I level in the National Collegiate Athletic Association (NCAA). Played mostly during March, the tournament was first conducted in 1939 and currently consists of 76 teams. Known for its upsets of favored teams with its single game single-elimination format, it has become one of the most popular annual sporting events in the US.

The current 76-team format will begin with the next edition of the tournament in 2027; the tournament format had remained largely unchanged since 1985, when it expanded to 64 teams. Before then, the size of the field varied from as little as 8 teams to as many as 53. The field was restricted to conference champions until at-large bids were extended in 1975 and teams were not fully seeded until 1979. In 2020, the tournament was cancelled for the first time due to the COVID-19 pandemic and in the next season, the tournament was contested completely in the state of Indiana as a precaution.

37 schools have won the tournament. UCLA has the most with 11 championships and their coach John Wooden has the most titles of any coach with 10. The University of Kentucky (UK) has eight championships, the University of Connecticut (UConn) and the University of North Carolina have six championships, Duke University and Indiana University have five championships, the University of Kansas (KU) has four championships and the University of Florida and Villanova University have three titles. The University of Louisville has won three national championships but one has been vacated. Six other programs are tied with two national championships and 21 teams have won it once.

All tournament games are broadcast by CBS, TBS, TNT and truTV under the program name NCAA March Madness. With a contract through 2032, Paramount Skydance and Warner Bros. Discovery pay $891 million annually for the broadcast rights. The NCAA distributes revenue to participating teams based on how far they advance, which provides significant funding for college athletics. The tournament has become part of American popular culture through bracket contests that award money and other prizes for correctly predicting the outcomes of the most games. In 2023, Sports Illustrated reported that an estimated 60 to 100 million brackets are filled out each year.

== History ==
=== Early era (1939–1970) ===
The first tournament was held in 1939 and was won by Oregon. It was the idea of Ohio State coach Harold Olsen. The National Association of Basketball Coaches operated the first tournament for the NCAA.

From 1939 to 1950, the NCAA tournament consisted of eight teams, with each selected from a geographical district. Multiple conferences were considered part of each district, such as the Missouri Valley and the Big Seven conferences in one district and the Southern and Southeastern conferences in another, which often led to top-ranked teams being left out of the tournament. The issue came to a head in 1950, when the NCAA suggested that third-ranked Kentucky and fifth-ranked North Carolina State compete in a playoff game for a bid, but Kentucky refused, believing they should be given the bid as the higher-ranked team. In response, the NCAA doubled the field to 16 in 1951, adding two additional districts and six spots for at-large teams. Conferences could still only have one team in the tournament, but multiple conferences from the same geographic district could now be included through at-large bids. This development helped the NCAA compete with the National Invitation Tournament for prestige.

In the eight team format, the tournament was split into the East and West Regions, with champions meeting in the national championship game. The first two rounds for each region were conducted at the same site and the national championship and, from 1946, consolation game occurred a week later. Some years, the site of the national championship was the same site as a regional championship and in other years a new site. With the expansion to 16 teams, the tournament retained the original format of the national semifinals being the regional finals in 1951. For the 1952 tournament, there were four regions named East-1, East-2, West-1, West-2, all played at separate sites. The regional champions met for the national semifinals and championship at a separate location a week later, establishing the format with two final rounds of the tournament (although the name "Final Four" would not be used in branding until the 1980s).

The 1953 tournament expanded to include 22 teams and added a fifth round, with ten teams receiving a bye to the regional semifinals. The number of teams would fluctuate from 22 to 25 teams over the next two decades, but the number of rounds remained the same. The double region naming was kept until 1956, when the regions were named the East, Midwest, West, and Far West. In 1957, the regions were named East, Mideast, Midwest, and West, which remained until 1985. Regions were paired in the national semifinals based on their geographic locations, with the two eastern regions meeting in one semifinal and two western regions meeting in the other semifinal.

Beginning in 1946, a national third-place game was held before the championship game. Regional third-place games were played in the West from 1939 and the East from 1941. Despite expansion in 1951, there were still only two regions, each with a third-place game. The 1952 tournament had four regions each with a third-place game.

This era of the tournament was characterized by competition with the National Invitation Tournament. Founded by the Metropolitan Basketball Writers Association one year before the NCAA tournament, the NIT was held entirely in New York City at Madison Square Garden. Because New York was the center of the press in the United States, the NIT often received more coverage than the NCAA tournament in early years. Additionally, good teams were often excluded from the NCAA tournament because each conference could only have one bid and conference champions were even excluded because of the 8-district system before 1950. Teams often competed in both tournaments during the first decade, with City College of New York winning both the NIT and NCAA tournament in 1950. Soon after, the NCAA banned teams from participating in both tournaments.

=== Pre-modern era (1971–1984) ===
Two major changes over the course of the early 1970s led to the NCAA becoming the preeminent post-season tournament for college basketball. First, the NCAA added a rule in 1971 that banned teams who declined an invitation to the NCAA tournament from participating in other post-season tournaments. This was in response to eighth-ranked Marquette declining its invitation in 1970 and instead participating in and winning the NIT after coach Al McGuire complained about their regional placement. Since then, the NCAA tournament has clearly been the major one, with conference champions and the majority of the top-ranked teams participating. Second, the NCAA allowed multiple teams per conference starting in 1975. This was in response to several highly ranked teams being denied bids during the early 1970s. These included South Carolina in 1970, which was undefeated in conference play but lost in the ACC tournament; second-ranked USC in 1971, which was left out because their conference was represented by top-ranked UCLA; and Maryland in 1974, which was ranked #3 but lost the ACC tournament championship game to eventual national champion North Carolina State.

To accommodate at-large bids, the tournament expanded in 1975 to include 32 teams, allowing a second team to represent a conference in addition to the conference champion, and eliminated byes. In 1979, the tournament expanded to 40 teams and added a sixth round; 24 teams received byes to the second round. Eight more teams were added in 1980 with only 16 teams receiving byes, and the restriction on the number of at-large bids from a conference was removed. In 1983, a seventh round with four play-in games was added; an additional play-in game was added in 1984. Beginning in 1973, the regional pairings for the national semifinals were rotated on a yearly basis instead of the two eastern and two western regions always playing.

Seeding also began during this era, adding drama and ensuring better teams had better paths to the Final Four. In 1978, teams were seeded in two separate pools based on their qualification method. Each region had four teams which automatically qualified ranked Q1–Q4 and four teams which received an at-large bid ranked L1–L4. In 1979, all teams in each region were seeded 1 through 10, without regards for their qualification method.

The national semifinals were moved to Saturday and the championship was moved to Monday evening in 1973, where they have remained since. Until then, the championship had been played on Saturday and the semifinals two days before.

The third-place games were eliminated during this era, with the last regional third-place games played in 1975 and the last national third-place game played in 1981.

=== Modern era (1985–present) ===
In 1985, the tournament expanded to 64 teams, eliminating all byes and play-ins. For the first time, all teams had to win six games to win the tournament. This expansion led to increased media coverage and popularity in American culture. Until 2001, the First and Second Rounds occurred at two sites in each region.

In 1985, the Mideast Region was renamed the Southeast Region. In 1997, the Southeast Region became the South Region. From 2004 to 2006, the regions were named after their host cities, e.g. the Phoenix regional in 2004, the Chicago regional in 2005, and the Minneapolis regional in 2006, but reverted to the traditional geographic designations beginning in 2007. For the 2011 tournament, the South Region was the Southeast Region and the Midwest Region the Southwest Region; both returned to their previous names in 2012.

The 1996 Final Four was the last to take place in a venue built specifically for basketball. Since then, the Final Four has exclusively been played in large indoor football stadiums.

Beginning in 2001, the field was expanded from 64 to 65 teams, adding to the tournament what was informally known as the "play-in game". This was in response to the creation of the Mountain West Conference during 1999. Originally, the winner of the Mountain West's tournament did not receive an automatic bid, due to standard NCAA rules regarding new conferences and automatic bids. As an alternative to eliminating an at-large bid, the NCAA expanded the tournament to 65 teams. The #64 and #65 seeds were seeded in a regional bracket as 16 seeds, and then played the opening round game on the Tuesday preceding the first weekend of the tournament. This game was always played at the University of Dayton Arena in Dayton, Ohio.

Starting in 2004, the selection committee revealed the overall rankings among the #1 seeds. Based on these rankings, the regions were paired so that the #1 overall seed would play the #4 overall seed in a national semifinal if both teams made the Final Four. This was to prevent the top two teams from meeting before the finals, as was largely considered the case in 1996 when Kentucky played Massachusetts in the Final Four. Previously, regional pairings rotated yearly.

In 2010, there was speculation about increasing the tournament size to as many as 128 teams. On April 1, 2010, the NCAA announced that it was looking at expanding to 96 teams for 2011. However, three weeks later the NCAA announced a new television contract with CBS/Turner that expanded the field to 68 teams, instead of 96, starting in 2011. The First Four was created by the addition of three play-in games. Two of the First Four games pit 16 seeds against each other. The two other games, however, pit the last at-large bids against each other. The seeding for the at-large teams will be determined by the selection committee and fluctuates based on the true seed ranking of the teams. Explaining the reasoning for this format, selection committee chairman Dan Guerrero said, "We felt if we were going to expand the field it would create better drama for the tournament if the First Four was much more exciting. They could all be on the 10 line or the 12 line or the 11 line." As part of this expansion, the round of 64 was renamed the second round and the round of 32 was renamed the Third Round, with the First Four being officially the First Round. In 2016, the rounds of 64 and 32 returned to their previous names of the first round and the second round and the First Four became the official name of the opening round.

In 2016, the NCAA introduced a new "NCAA March Madness" logo for tournament-wide branding, which included bespoke tourney-exclusive courts at each of the tournament venues from the same manufacturer with the same floor composition across each round. Previously, the NCAA would use the venue's existing default floor (be it solely for college basketball or a dual-use NBA/college floor) with tournament and NCAA decals applied.

Beginning in 2017, the #1 overall seed picks the sites for their first- and second-round games and their potential regional games. Additionally, the selection committee began releasing the top 16 seeds three weeks before Selection Sunday as a bracket preview.

Due to the COVID-19 pandemic, the NCAA cancelled the 2020 tournament. Initially, the NCAA discussed holding a shortened version with only 16 teams in the Final Four host city of Atlanta. Once the vast scale of the pandemic was understood, the NCAA cancelled the tournament, making it the first edition not to be held, and decided against releasing the brackets that the Selection Committee had been working on.

In 2021, the tournament was held entirely in the state of Indiana to reduce travel. This was to date the only time the tournament was conducted in one state. As a COVID-19 precaution, all participating teams were required to stay in NCAA-provided accommodations until they lost. The schedule was adjusted to provided extended time for COVID-19 evaluation before the tournament began, with the First Four occurring entirely on Thursday, the First and Second Rounds pushed one day back to a Friday-Monday window, and the Sweet Sixteen and Elite Eight pushed to a Friday-Monday window as well. Teams ranked 69–72 by the Selection Committee were put on "standby" to replace any team that withdrew from the tournament due to COVID-19 protocols during the 48 hours after the brackets were announced. Only one game was declared a no contest due to COVID-19, with Oregon advancing to the second round because VCU could not participate due to COVID-19 protocols. VCU was not replaced by one of the first four teams out because the COVID-19 infections started more than two days after the brackets were announced. The tournament returned to its regular format in 2022.

In response to protests from players in the 2021 women's tournament about the differing facility quality and branding, both the men's and women's tournaments were branded as "NCAA March Madness" starting in 2022 with variations of the same tournament-wide logo used by the men's tournament. Additionally, the Final Four for the men's tournament was branded as the "Men's Final Four" beginning in 2022, reflecting the "Women's Final Four" branding in use for that tournament since 1987.

In 2023, the NCAA Division I Transformation Committee published a report that recommended expanding the tournament to include 25% of all competing teams in Division I, which would amount to roughly 90 teams. Discussions within the NCAA took place over the next two years to potentially expend the tournament to 72 or 76 teams. On May 7, 2026, the NCAA officially voted to expand the men's and women's tournaments to 76 teams beginning with the 2027 edition. Under the new format, the First Four will expand from featuring eight teams in four games to 24 teams in 12 games. Of the 24 First Four teams, 12 will be the lowest-seeded at-large teams, and the other 12 will be the lowest-seeded automatic qualifying teams. On July 10, 2026, it was announced that Wichita, Kansas, alongside Dayton, Ohio (which has hosted the First Four games since 2001), will host these Opening Round games in 2027 and 2028.

=== Evolution overview ===
Years	Teams			Byes	Rounds	Play-in games	Games played	Regions				Notes
Years	Automatic	At-large	Total	Byes	Rounds	Play-in games	Games played	Regions				Notes
1939–40	0	8	8	0	3	0	8	East		West		National semifinals are regional finals until 1952; West Region third-place game begins in 1939; teams selected from geographic districts with each district limited to one team
1941–45	0	8	8	0	3	0	9	East		West		East Region third-place game begins in 1941
1946–50	0	8	8	0	3	0	10	East		West		National third-place game begins
1951	10	6	16	0	4	0	18	East		West		Tournament expands to 16 teams; ten teams selected from geographic districts and six teams selected at-large; limit of one team per conference
1952	10	6	16	0	4	0	20	East 1	East 2	West 1	West 2	National semifinals move to site of national championship; all regions have third-place game
1953	14	8	22	10	5	0	26	East 1	East 2	West 1	West 2	First round added before regional semifinals; byes assigned based on conference performance in previous five tournaments
1954–55	15	9	24	8	5	0	28	East 1	East 2	West 1	West 2	
1956	17	8	25	7	5	0	29	East	Midwest	West	Far West	
1957	16	7	23	9	5	0	27	East	Mideast	Midwest	West	
1958	16	8	24	8	5	0	28	East	Mideast	Midwest	West	
1959	16	7	23	9	5	0	27	East	Mideast	Midwest	West	
1960	14	11	25	7	5	0	29	East	Mideast	Midwest	West	
1961	15	9	24	8	5	0	28	East	Mideast	Midwest	West	
1962–64	15	10	25	7	5	0	29	East	Mideast	Midwest	West	
1965	15	8	23	9	5	0	27	East	Mideast	Midwest	West	
1966	14	8	22	10	5	0	26	East	Mideast	Midwest	West	
1967–68	15	8	23	9	5	0	27	East	Mideast	Midwest	West	
1969–70	15	10	25	7	5	0	29	East	Mideast	Midwest	West	
1971	15	10	25	7	5	0	29	East	Mideast	Midwest	West	NCAA bans teams who decline bid from participating in other tournaments in 1971
1972–74	16	9	25	7	5	0	29	East	Mideast	Midwest	West	
1975	20	12	32	0	5	0	36	East	Mideast	Midwest	West	Two teams from the same conference allowed; last regional third-place games played
1976–77	21	11	32	0	5	0	32	East	Mideast	Midwest	West	
1978	21	11	32	0	5	0	32	East	Mideast	Midwest	West	Teams seeded in separate at-large and automatic qualifier pools in 1978
1979	23	17	40	24	6	0	40	East	Mideast	Midwest	West	Second round added before regional semifinals; teams seeded 1–10 in each region, but top 4 seeds are assigned based on conference performance in previous five tournaments
1980	23	25	48	16	6	0	48	East	Mideast	Midwest	West	More than two teams can be selected from a conference; teams fully seeded based only on season performance
1981	22	26	48	16	6	0	48	East	Mideast	Midwest	West	Last national third-place game played in 1981
1982	28	20	48	16	6	0	47	East	Mideast	Midwest	West	
1983	28	24	52	16	7	4	51	East	Mideast	Midwest	West	Four play-in games added for the final seed in each region
1984	29	24	53	16	7	5	52	East	Mideast	Midwest	West	Fifth play-in game added for the eleventh seed in the East Region
1985	29	35	64	0	6	0	63	East	Southeast	Midwest	West	Mideast Region renamed Southeast Region in 1985
1986	30	34	64	0	6	0	63	East	Southeast	Midwest	West	
1987	29	35	64	0	6	0	63	East	Southeast	Midwest	West	
1988-90	30	34	64	0	6	0	63	East	Southeast	Midwest	West	
1991	29	35	64	0	6	0	63	East	Southeast	Midwest	West	
1992–94	30	34	64	0	6	0	63	East	Southeast	Midwest	West	
1995	29	35	64	0	6	0	63	East	Southeast	Midwest	West	
1996–97	30	34	64	0	6	0	63	East	Southeast	Midwest	West	
1998–2000	30	34	64	0	6	0	63	East	South	Midwest	West	Southeast Region renamed the South Region in 1998
2001	31	34	65	0	7	1	64	East	South	Midwest	West	Opening round added with a play-in game for the final 16 seed
2002–03	31	34	65	0	7	1	64	East	South	Midwest	West	Pod system for first and second rounds begins in 2002 to reduce travel
2004	31	34	65	0	7	1	64	East Rutherford	Atlanta	St. Louis	Phoenix	Ranking among #1 seeds announced and used to determine region pairings in Final Four
2005	31	34	65	0	7	1	64	Syracuse	Austin	Chicago	Albuquerque	
2006	31	34	65	0	7	1	64	Washington, D.C.	Atlanta	Minneapolis	Oakland	
2007–10	31	34	65	0	7	1	64	East	South	Midwest	West	
2011	31	37	68	0	7	4	67	East	Southeast	Southwest	West	First Four added, true seed list released, and rounds of 64 and 32 renamed second and third rounds
2012–2013	31	37	68	0	7	4	67	East	South	Midwest	West	
2014–15	32	36	68	0	7	4	67	East	South	Midwest	West	
2016	32	36	68	0	7	4	67	East	South	Midwest	West	Rounds of 64 and 32 renamed first and second rounds and "First Four" becomes official name of the opening round
2017–19	32	36	68	0	7	4	67	East	South	Midwest	West	Overall #1 seed picks assignment for first and second rounds and regional; selection committee releases bracket preview of top 16 seeds three weeks before Selection Sunday
2020	Tournament cancelled due to COVID-19 pandemic											
2021	31 (Note: Ivy League cancelled winter sports due to COVID-19)	37	68	0	7	4	66 (Note: The first-round game between Oregon and VCU was not played due to a COVID-19 outbreak among VCU players. The game was declared a no contest and Oregon was advanced to the second round.)	East	South	Midwest	West	All games played in Indiana due to COVID-19 precautions
2022–2024	32	36	68	0	7	4	67	East	South	Midwest	West	
2025–2026	31	37	68	0	7	4	67	East	South	Midwest	West	
2027–present	32	44	76	0	7	12	75	East	South	Midwest	West	First Four expands from 8 teams to 24 teams and is renamed Opening Round
Years	Automatic	At-large	Total	Byes	Rounds	Play-in games	Games played	Regions				Notes
Years	Teams			Byes	Rounds	Play-in games	Games played	Regions				Notes

== Format ==
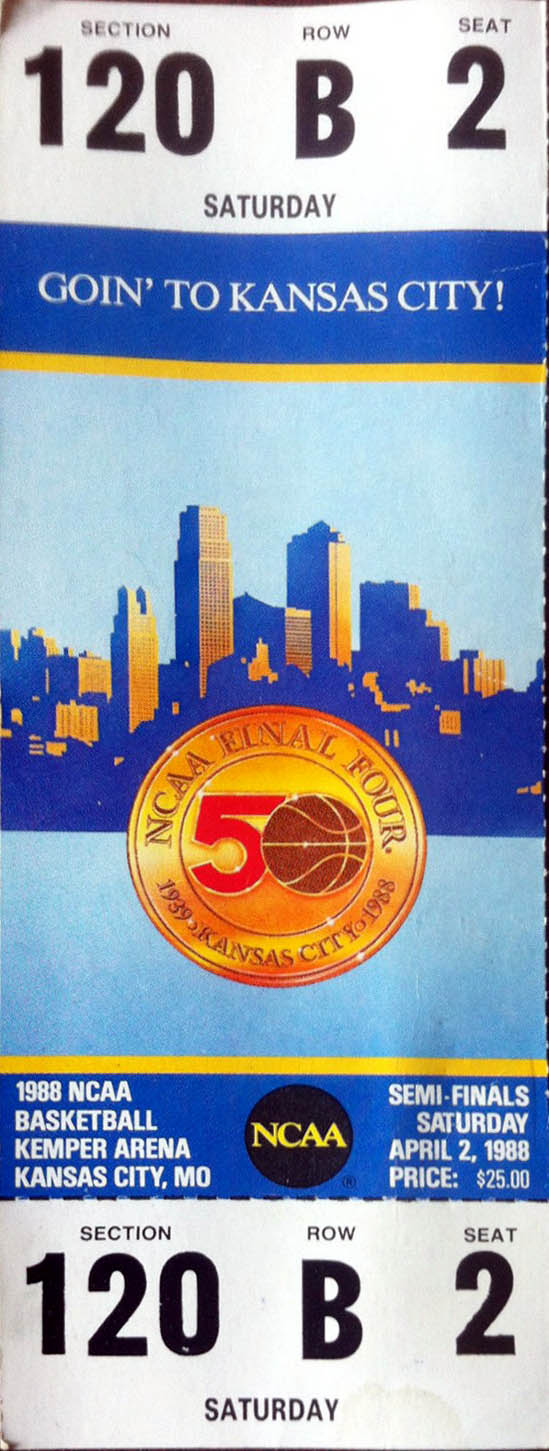
A ticket from the 1988 tournament held in Kansas City, Missouri

The tournament consists of 76 teams competing in seven rounds of a single-elimination bracket. Thirty-two teams automatically qualify for the tournament by winning their conference tournament, played during the two weeks before the tournament, and forty-four teams qualify by receiving an at-large bid based on their performance during the season. The selection committee determines the at-large bids, ranks all the teams 1 to 76, and places the teams in the bracket, all of which is revealed publicly on the Sunday before the tournament, dubbed "Selection Sunday" by the media and fans. There is no reseeding during the tournament and matchups in each subsequent round are predetermined by the bracket.

The tournament is divided into four regions, with each region having sixteen to eighteen teams. Regions are named after the U.S. geographic area of the city hosting each regional semifinal and regional final (the tournament's third and 4th round overall). Host cities for all regions vary from year to year.

The tournament is played over three weekends, with two rounds occurring each weekend. Before the first weekend, 24 teams compete in the Opening Round to advance to the first round. Six games pair the lowest-ranked conference champions and Six games pair the lowest-ranked at-large qualifiers. The first and second rounds are played during the first weekend, the regional semifinals and regional finals during the second weekend, and the national semifinals and national championship game during the third weekend. Regional rounds are branded as the Sweet Sixteen and Elite Eight and the third weekend is branded as the Final Four, all named after the number of teams remaining at the beginning of the round. All games, including the Opening Round, are scheduled so that teams will have one rest day between each game. This format has been in use since 2011, with minor changes to the schedule in 2021 due to the COVID-19 pandemic.

Summary of tournament rounds
Round	Teams Remaining	Teams Competing	Games	Week	Dates
Opening round (play-in round)	76	24	12	1st	Tuesday & Wednesday
First round	64	64	32	1st	Thursday & Friday
Second round	32	32	16	1st	Saturday & Sunday
Sweet Sixteen (regional semifinals)	16	16	8	2nd	Thursday & Friday
Elite Eight (regional finals)	8	8	4	2nd	Saturday & Sunday
Final Four (national semifinals)	4	4	2	3rd	Saturday
National championship game	2	2	1	3rd	Monday

=== Seeding and bracket ===
The Selection Committee, which includes conference commissioners and university athletic directors appointed by the NCAA, determines the bracket during the week before the tournament. Since the results of several conference tournaments occurring during the same week can significantly impact the bracket, the Committee often makes several brackets for different results.

To make the bracket, the Committee ranks the whole field from 1 to 76; these are referred to as the true seed. The committee then divides the teams amongst the four regions, giving each a seed between No. 1 and No. 16. The same four seeds in all the regions are referred to as the seed line (i.e. the No. 6 seed line). 24 teams are doubled up and compete in the First Four. Eight of the paired teams compete for the No. 16 seeds, four of the paired teams compete for the No. 15 teams, and the other 12 paired teams are the last at-large teams awarded bids to the tournament and compete for a seed line in the No. 10 to No. 14 range, which varies year to year based on the true seeds of the teams overall.

The top four overall seeds are placed as No. 1 seeds in each region. The regions are paired so that if all the No. 1 seeds reached the Final Four true seed No. 1 would play No. 4 and No. 2 would play No. 3. The No. 2 teams are preferably placed so that the No. 5 true seed will not be paired with the No. 1 true seed. The committee ensures competitive balance among the top four seeds in each region by adding the true seed values up and comparing the values among the regions. If there is significant deviation, some teams will be moved among the regions to balance the true seed distribution.

If a conference has two to four teams in the top four seeds, they will be placed in different regions. Otherwise, teams from the same conference are placed to avoid a rematch before the regional finals if they have played three or more times in the season, the regional semifinals if they have played twice, or the second round if they have played once. Additionally, the committee is advised to avoid rematches from the regular season and the previous years' tournament in the First Four. Finally, the committee will attempt to ensure that a team is not moved out of their preferred geographical region an inordinate number of times based on their placement in the previous two tournaments. To follow these rules and preferences, the committee may move a team off of their expected seed line. Thus, for example, the 40th overall ranked team, originally slated to be a No. 10 seed within a particular region, may instead be moved up to a No. 9 seed or moved down to a No. 11 seed.

Since 2012, the committee has released the No. 1 to 68 true seed list after announcing the bracket. Since 2017, the Selection Committee has released a list of the top 16 teams three weeks before Selection Sunday. This list does not guarantee any team a bid, as the Committee re-ranks all teams when starting the final selection process.

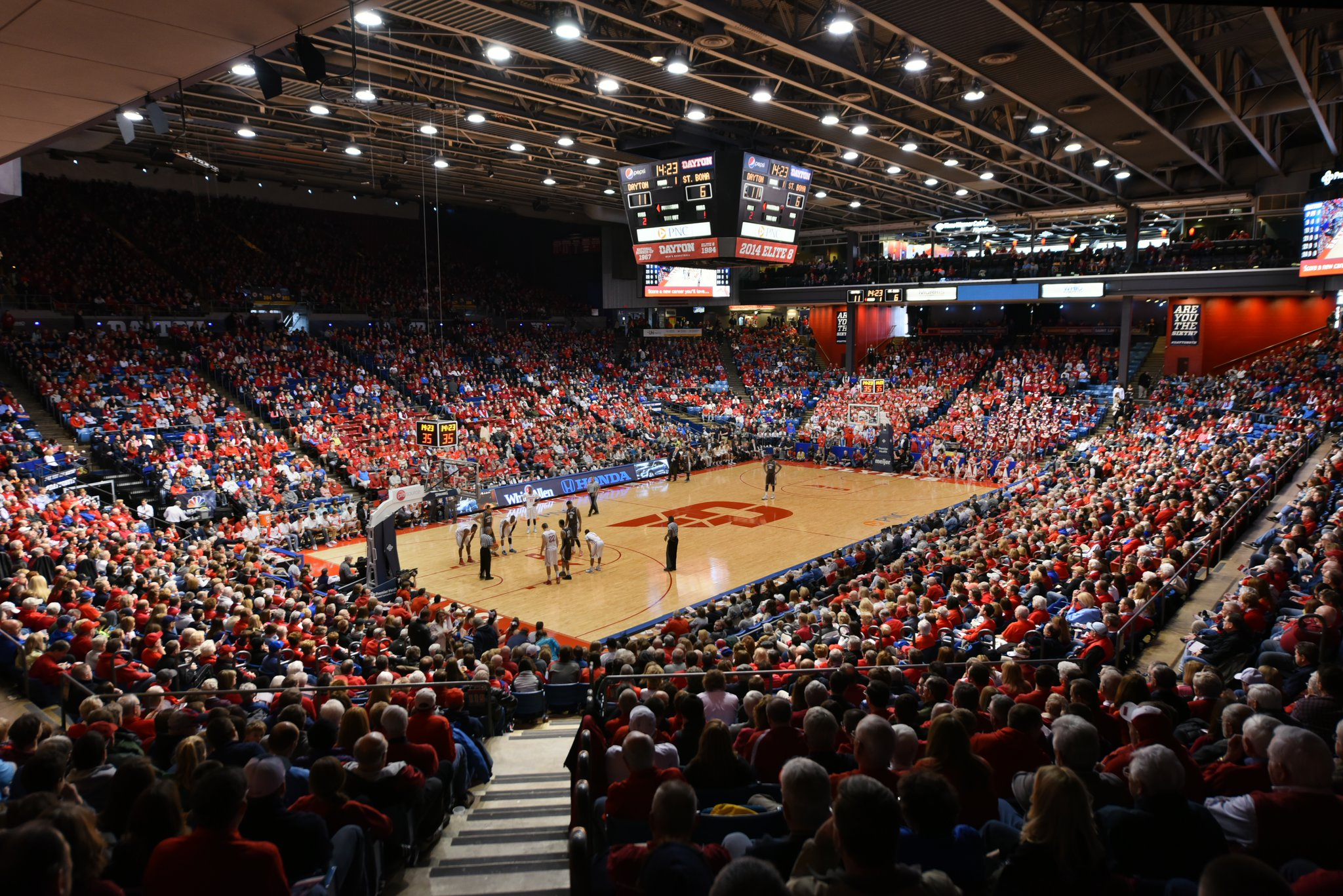
The University of Dayton Arena, which has hosted all First Four games since the round's inception in 2011 (except 2021), as well as its precursor, the single "play-in" game held from 2001 to 2010. As of 2026, the arena has hosted 143 tournament games, the most of any venue.

The seed line of the four at-large teams competing in the First Four has varied each year, depending on the overall ranking of the at-large teams in the field.

Seed	Count	Years
10	2	2024 (×2)
11	18	2011, 2013, 2014, 2015–2019 (×2), 2021 (×2), 2022, 2023 (×2), 2025 (x2), 2026 (x2)
12	4	2011, 2012, 2014, 2022
13	1	2013
14	1	2012

=== Venues ===
In the men's tournament, all sites are nominally neutral; teams are prohibited from playing tournament games on their home courts during the first, second, and regional rounds. Under NCAA rules, any court on which a team hosts more than three regular-season games (not including preseason or conference tournament games) is considered a "home court". For the First Four and the Final Four, the home court prohibition does not apply because only one venue hosts these rounds. The First Four is regularly hosted by the Dayton Flyers; as such, the team competed on their home court in 2015. Because the Final Four is hosted at indoor football stadiums, it is unlikely that a team will play on their home court in the future. The last time this was possible was in 1996 when the Continental Airlines Arena, home court of Seton Hall, hosted.

For the first and second rounds, eight venues host games, four on each day of the round. Each venue hosts two sets of four teams, referred to as "pods." To limit travel, teams are placed in pods closer to their home unless seeding rules would prevent it. Because each pod includes a top 4 seed, the highest ranked teams normally get the closest sites.

The possible pods by seeding are:

- Pod A: 1 v. 16 and 8 v. 9
- Pod B: 2 v. 15 and 7 v. 10
- Pod C: 3 v. 14 and 6 v. 11
- Pod D: 4 v. 13 and 5 v. 12

== Champions ==
=== Titles by school ===
*Vacated title not included

Team	#	Years
UCLA	11	1964, 1965, 1967, 1968, 1969, 1970, 1971, 1972, 1973, 1975, 1995
Kentucky	8	1948, 1949, 1951, 1958, 1978, 1996, 1998, 2012
North Carolina	6	1957, 1982, 1993, 2005, 2009, 2017
UConn	6	1999, 2004, 2011, 2014, 2023, 2024
Duke	5	1991, 1992, 2001, 2010, 2015
Indiana	5	1940, 1953, 1976, 1981, 1987
Kansas	4	1952, 1988, 2008, 2022
Villanova	3	1985, 2016, 2018
Florida	3	2006, 2007, 2025
Cincinnati	2	1961, 1962
Louisville	2	1980, 1986, 2013*
Michigan	2	1989, 2026
Michigan State	2	1979, 2000
NC State	2	1974, 1983
Oklahoma State	2	1945, 1946
San Francisco	2	1955, 1956
Arizona	1	1997
Arkansas	1	1994
Baylor	1	2021
California	1	1959
CCNY	1	1950
Georgetown	1	1984
Holy Cross	1	1947
La Salle	1	1954
Loyola Chicago	1	1963
Marquette	1	1977
Maryland	1	2002
Ohio State	1	1960
Oregon	1	1939
Stanford	1	1942
Syracuse	1	2003
UNLV	1	1990
UTEP	1	1966
Utah	1	1944
Virginia	1	2019
Wisconsin	1	1941
Wyoming	1	1943

Schools that have won the NCAA Division I men's basketball tournament
11, 8, 6, 5, 4, 3, 2, 1

== Appearances ==
A total of 333 teams have appeared in the NCAA tournament since 1939. Because the NCAA did not split into divisions until 1957, some schools that have appeared in the tournament are no longer in Division I. Among Division I schools, 46 have never made the tournament, including 11 that are ineligible because they are transitioning to Division I.

=== Results by year ===
Key

- **CH** National champion
- RU National runner-up
- F4 Final Four
- E8 Elite Eight
- 16 Sweet Sixteen (Began in 1951.)
- 32 Round of 32 (Began in 1975.)
  - 22 23 24 25 Round of 22–25 (Between 1953 and 1974, between 22 and 25 teams were invited to the tournament.)
- ✖ Round of 64 (Began in 1979. Fewer than 64 teams invited before 1985.)
- ƒ First Four (2011–2026), Opening Round (1983-1984, 2001-2010, and 2027–present)
- ~~**CH**~~ ~~RU~~ ~~F4~~ ~~E8~~ ~~16~~ ~~32~~ ~~✖~~ ~~ƒ~~ The team achieved the placement shown, but the participation was later vacated. These vacated appearances are not included in the totals columns, with two exceptions.
  - After the University of Michigan basketball scandal, Michigan's appearance in the 1992 Final Four and Championship Game were vacated, but not their entire participation in the tournament. Therefore, Michigan is listed as ~~RU~~ in 1992, but the Wolverines credited with an appearance, a Sweet Sixteen, and an Elite Eight in the totals columns.
  - After the Syracuse University athletics scandal, Syracuse forfeited games across multiple seasons, including 2004–05, 2006–07, 2010–11, and 2011–12, three of which included an NCAA Tournament appearance. However, the NCAA allowed Syracuse to keep their NCAA appearances in the record book, so those seasons are not marked with strikethrough, and are fully included in the totals columns.

Programs are listed below under their current athletic branding, which is not necessarily what was used at the time. For example, Oklahoma State was known as "Oklahoma A&M" when it won back-to-back championships in 1945 and 1946, and UTEP was known as "Texas Western" when it won the national championship in 1966.

For each season starting in 1978, the team's seed is shown in superscript to the left of the result.

School	Conference	#	16	E8	F4	CG	CH	39	40	41	42	43	44	45	46	47	48	49	50	51	52	53	54	55	56	57	58	59	60	61	62	63	64	65	66	67	68	69	70	71	72	73	74	75	76	77	78	79	80	81	82	83	84	85	86	87	88	89	90	91	92	93	94	95	96	97	98	99	00	01	02	03	04	05	06	07	08	09	10	11	12	13	14	15	16	17	18	19	21	22	23	24	25	26
**UCLA**	Big Ten	**52**	**37**	**22**	**18**	**12**	**11**												E8		16				16						F4	16	**CH**	**CH**		**CH**	**CH**	**CH**	**CH**	**CH**	**CH**	**CH**	F4	**CH**	F4	16	¹16	¹E8	~~⁸RU~~	³32		²32				⁴32		⁷32	⁷16	⁴✖	¹E8	⁹32	⁵✖	**¹CH**	⁴✖	²E8	⁶16	~~⁵✖~~	⁶16	⁴16	⁸16			¹¹✖	²RU	²F4	¹F4	⁶32		⁷32		⁶✖	⁴16	¹¹16		³16	¹¹ƒ		¹¹F4	⁴16	²16		⁷32	⁷32
**Kentucky**	SEC	**63**	**49**	**38**	**17**	**12**	**8**				F4			E8			**CH**	**CH**		**CH**	E8			16	E8	E8	**CH**	16		E8	E8		16		RU		E8	16	E8	16	E8	E8		RU		E8	**¹CH**		¹16	²32	⁶✖	³E8	¹F4	¹²16	¹E8	⁸✖	~~²16~~				²E8	¹F4	³32	¹E8	**¹CH**	¹RU	**²CH**	³E8	⁵32	²16	⁴16	¹E8	¹32	²E8	⁸32	⁸32	¹¹✖		¹E8	⁴F4	**¹CH**		⁸RU	¹F4	⁴32	²E8	⁵16	²E8		²✖	⁶32	³✖	³16	⁷32
**North Carolina**	ACC	**55**	**38**	**29**	**21**	**12**	**6**			E8					RU											**CH**		23								F4	RU	F4			F4			16	32	RU	¹32	¹32	³32	²RU	**¹CH**	²E8	¹16	²E8	³16	¹E8	²E8	²16	⁸16	¹F4	⁴16	**¹CH**	¹32	²F4	⁶32	¹F4	¹F4	³✖	⁸F4	²32			⁶32	**¹CH**	³32	¹E8	¹F4	**¹CH**		²E8	¹E8	⁸32	⁶32	⁴16	¹RU	**¹CH**	²32	¹16	⁸✖	⁸RU		¹16	¹¹✖	⁶✖
**UConn**	Big East	**38**	**20**	**14**	**8**	**7**	**6**													16			24		16	23	24	23	25			25	E8	23		23									16			⁵32											¹E8	¹¹16	⁹32		²16	²E8	~~¹16~~		²E8	**¹CH**	⁵32		²E8	⁵16	**²CH**	²32	¹E8		⁴✖	¹F4		**³CH**	⁹✖		**⁷CH**		⁹32				⁷✖	⁵✖	**⁴CH**	**¹CH**	⁸32	²RU
**Duke**	ACC	**48**	**35**	**26**	**18**	**11**	**5**																	24					E8			F4	RU		F4												¹RU	²32	⁴E8				³32	³32	¹RU	⁵16	²F4	²F4	³RU	**²CH**	**¹CH**	³32	²RU		⁸✖	²32	¹E8	¹RU	¹16	**¹CH**	¹16	³16	¹F4	¹16	¹16	⁶✖	²32	²16	**¹CH**	¹16	²✖	²E8	³✖	**¹CH**	⁴16	²32	²E8	¹E8		²F4	⁵32	⁴E8	¹F4	¹E8
**Indiana**	Big Ten	**41**	**23**	**11**	**8**	**6**	**5**		**CH**													**CH**	16				16									16						F4		E8	**CH**		¹16		²16	**³CH**	⁵32	²16	⁴E8		³✖	**¹CH**	⁴✖	²16	⁸✖	²16	²F4	¹E8	⁵16	⁹✖	⁶✖	⁸✖	⁷32	⁶32	⁶✖	⁴✖	⁵RU	⁷32			⁶32	⁷32	⁸✖				⁴16	¹16		¹⁰✖	⁵16					¹²✖	⁴32			
**Kansas**	Big 12	**53**	**33**	**24**	**15**	**10**	**4**		RU		E8										**CH**	RU				RU			E8						E8	16				F4			F4	32			³32			⁷16			⁵32	³32	¹F4	⁵16	**⁶CH**		²32	³RU	¹32	²F4	⁴16	¹16	²E8	¹16	¹32	⁶32	⁸32	⁴16	¹F4	²RU	⁴E8	³✖	⁴✖	¹E8	**¹CH**	³16	¹32	¹E8	²RU	¹16	²32	²32	¹E8	¹E8	~~¹F4~~	⁴32	³32	**¹CH**	¹32	⁴32	⁷✖	⁴32
**Florida**	SEC	**24**	**11**	**10**	**6**	**4**	**3**																																																	~~⁶16~~	~~⁶32~~	⁷✖					³F4	¹⁰✖				⁶16	⁵RU	³32	⁵✖	²32	⁵✖	⁴32	**³CH**	**¹CH**			¹⁰✖	²E8	⁷E8	³E8	¹F4			⁴E8	⁶32	¹⁰32	⁷32			⁷✖	**¹CH**	¹32
**Villanova**	Big East	**41**	**21**	**14**	**6**	**3**	**3**	F4										E8		16				16							E8		16					25	E8	~~RU~~	16						²E8		⁸32	⁹32	³E8	³E8	⁷32	**⁸CH**	¹⁰32		⁶E8		¹²✖	⁹32				³✖	³32	⁴32		⁸✖						⁵16	¹E8	⁹✖	¹²16	³F4	²32	⁹✖		⁹✖	²32	¹32	**²CH**	¹32	**¹CH**	⁶32	⁵16	²F4				⁸✖
**Michigan**	Big Ten	**30**	**20**	**15**	**7**	**6**	**2**										E8																F4	RU	E8								E8	32	RU	E8								¹32	²32	⁹32	³16	**³CH**	³32		~~⁶RU~~	~~¹RU~~	³E8	⁹✖	~~⁷✖~~		~~³32~~											¹⁰32		⁸32	⁴✖	⁴RU	²E8		¹¹✖	⁷16	³RU	²16	¹E8	¹¹16			⁵16	**¹CH**
**Michigan State**	Big Ten	**39**	**23**	**15**	**10**	**3**	**2**																			F4		E8																			²E8	**²CH**						¹⁰✖	⁵16				¹16	⁵32	⁵32		⁷32	³✖			⁴16	¹F4	**¹CH**	¹F4	¹⁰✖	⁷E8	⁷✖	⁵F4	⁶✖	⁹32	⁵16	²RU	⁵F4	¹⁰✖	¹16	³16	⁴E8	⁷F4	²✖	⁹32	³32	²F4	¹¹ƒ	⁷32	⁷16	⁹32	²E8	³16
**Oklahoma State**	Big 12	**29**	**14**	**11**	**6**	**3**	**2**							**CH**	**CH**			RU		F4		E8	E8				E8							E8																		⁵✖								³16	²16	⁵32	⁴32	⁴F4			⁸32	⁹32	³E8	¹¹✖	⁷✖	⁶32	²F4	²16				⁸32	⁷✖			⁵✖	⁹✖	⁹✖		¹⁰✖			⁴32					
**Cincinnati**	Big 12	**33**	**13**	**8**	**6**	**3**	**2**																				16	F4	F4	**CH**	**CH**	RU			16									16	32	32															⁴F4	²E8	⁸✖	⁷32	²E8	³32	²32	³32	²32	⁵16	¹32	⁸✖	⁴32	⁷32						⁶32	⁶16	¹⁰✖	⁵✖	⁸32	⁹✖	⁶32	²32	⁷✖						
**Louisville**	ACC	**41**	**24**	**11**	**8**	**2**	**2**													16								F4		16			25			16	16				F4		16	F4		32	²16	³16	**²CH**	⁴32	³F4	¹F4	⁵16		**²CH**		⁵16	⁴16	⁴32		⁸32	⁴16	³16	¹¹✖	⁶16	⁶E8		⁷✖	⁷✖			⁴32	¹⁰✖	⁴F4		⁶32	³E8	¹E8	⁹✖	⁴✖	~~⁴F4~~	~~**¹CH**~~	~~⁴16~~	~~⁴E8~~		²32		⁷✖					⁸✖	⁶32
**NC State**	ACC	**28**	**15**	**7**	**4**	**2**	**2**												F4	E8	16		16		25									16					16				**CH**						⁴32		⁷✖	**⁶CH**		³E8	⁶E8	~~¹¹✖~~	~~³✖~~	⁵16		⁶32											⁷32	⁹✖	³32	¹⁰16	¹⁰32						¹¹16	⁸✖	¹²✖	⁸16			⁹✖				¹¹✖	¹¹F4		¹¹ƒ
**San Francisco**	West Coast	**17**	**12**	**7**	**3**	**2**	**2**																	**CH**	**CH**	F4	16					16	E8	E8							16	E8	E8			32	³16	⁴16		⁹✖	⁹✖																¹⁴✖																							¹⁰✖				
**Ohio State**	Big Ten	**32**	**19**	**14**	**10**	**5**	**1**	RU					F4	F4	F4				E8										**CH**	RU	RU						F4			E8									⁴16		⁸✖	³16		⁴32		⁹32			⁸32	¹16	¹E8							~~⁴F4~~	~~³32~~	~~⁵✖~~	~~⁴32~~				²32	¹RU		⁸✖	²16	¹16	²F4	²E8	⁶✖	¹⁰32			⁵32	¹¹32	²✖	⁷32				⁸✖
**Georgetown**	Big East	**31**	**12**	**9**	**5**	**4**	**1**					RU																																32	32			³32	³E8	⁷✖	¹RU	⁵32	**¹CH**	¹RU	⁴32	¹E8	⁸32	¹E8	³32	⁸32	⁶32		⁹32	⁶16	²E8	¹⁰✖				¹⁰16					⁷16	²F4	²32		³✖	⁶✖	³32	²✖		⁴32					¹²✖					
**Syracuse**	ACC	**41**	**24**	**10**	**6**	**3**	**1**																			E8									E8							16	25	F4	32	16	²32	⁴16	¹16			⁶32	³16	⁷32	²32	²RU	³32	²E8	²16	²✖	⁶32		⁴16	⁷32	⁴RU		⁵16	⁸✖	⁴16	⁵32		**³CH**	⁵16	⁴✖	⁵✖			³16	¹16	³32	¹E8	⁴F4	³32		¹⁰F4		¹¹16	⁸✖	¹¹16					
**Arkansas**	SEC	**37**	**19**	**11**	**6**	**2**	**1**			F4				F4				E8									16																			32	²F4	²E8	¹⁰✖	⁵16	⁴32	⁴16	²32	⁹32			¹¹✖	⁵32	⁴F4	¹E8	³32	⁴16	**¹CH**	²RU	¹²16		⁶32	⁴32	¹¹✖	⁷✖					⁸✖	¹²✖	⁹32							⁵32		⁸32	⁷✖		³E8	⁴E8	⁸16		¹⁰16	⁴16
**Arizona**	Big 12	**36**	**22**	**12**	**5**	**2**	**1**													16																									E8	32								¹⁰✖	⁹✖	¹⁰✖	¹F4	¹16	²32	²16	³✖	²✖	²F4	⁵✖	³16	**⁴CH**	¹E8	~~⁴✖~~	¹32	²RU	³16	¹E8	⁹✖	³E8	⁸32	⁸✖	~~¹⁰✖~~	¹²16		⁵E8		⁶16	¹E8	²E8	⁶✖	~~²16~~	~~⁴✖~~			¹16	²✖	²16	⁴16	¹F4
**Utah**	Big 12	**29**	**18**	**7**	**4**	**2**	**1**						**CH**	E8										16	E8			16	16	F4					F4											16	³16	⁸✖		³16		¹⁰16			¹⁴✖					⁴16		⁸32		⁴32	⁴16	²E8	³RU	²32	⁸32		¹²✖	⁹32	¹¹✖	⁶16				⁵✖						⁵16	³32									
**Wisconsin**	Big Ten	**29**	**12**	**6**	**4**	**2**	**1**			**CH**						E8																																															⁹32			⁷✖		⁵✖	⁸F4	⁶✖	⁸32	⁵16	⁶32	⁶E8	⁹✖	²32	³16	¹²32	⁴32	⁴16	⁴16	⁵✖	²F4	¹RU	⁷16	⁸16		⁵✖	⁹32	³32		⁵✖	³32	⁵✖
**Marquette**	Big East	**37**	**17**	**7**	**3**	**2**	**1**																	E8				16		24							16	E8		16	16	16	RU	32	E8	**CH**	¹32	³16	⁹✖		⁷32	⁹✖										¹²✖	⁶16		⁴32	⁷✖					⁵✖	³F4			⁷✖	⁸✖	⁶32	⁶32	⁶✖	¹¹16	³16	³E8				¹⁰✖		⁵✖		⁹✖	²32	²16	⁷✖	
**Baylor**	Big 12	**17**	**8**	**6**	**3**	**2**	**1**								E8		RU		F4																																						⁸✖																				¹¹✖		³E8		³E8		⁶16	³✖	⁵✖	³16		⁹32	**¹CH**	¹32	³32	³32	⁹32	
**California**	ACC	**18**	**7**	**5**	**3**	**2**	**1**								F4											E8	E8	**CH**	RU																														⁹32			⁶16	⁵✖		~~¹²✖~~	⁵16				⁸✖	⁶32	⁸32			⁷✖			⁷✖	⁸32		¹²ƒ	¹²32			⁴✖									
**La Salle**	Atlantic 10	**12**	**3**	**2**	**2**	**2**	**1**																**CH**	RU													23							32			⁴32		¹¹✖			¹²✖					¹³✖	⁸✖	⁴32		¹³✖																					¹³16												
**UNLV**	Mountain West	**20**	**10**	**5**	**4**	**1**	**1**																																					16	16	F4						³32	⁵16	⁴32	⁴16	¹F4	⁴32	⁴E8	**¹CH**	¹F4							¹²✖		¹⁰✖							⁷16	⁸32		⁸✖	⁸✖	⁶✖	⁵✖												
**Virginia**	ACC	**27**	**10**	**7**	**3**	**1**	**1**																																						32					¹F4	¹16	¹E8	⁷F4		⁵✖	⁵✖		⁵E8	⁷32	⁷✖		⁶16	⁷32	⁴E8		⁹✖				⁵✖						⁴32					¹⁰✖		¹16	²32	¹E8	⁵32	¹✖	**¹CH**	⁴✖		⁴✖	¹⁰ƒ		³32
**Oregon**	Big Ten	**19**	**10**	**7**	**2**	**1**	**1**	**CH**						E8															E8	24																																		⁶✖					⁷✖		²E8	⁸✖				³E8	⁹✖					¹²16	⁷32	⁸32	¹E8	³F4		¹²16	⁷16			¹¹32	⁵32	
**Maryland**	Big Ten	**30**	**15**	**4**	**2**	**1**	**1**																				16															E8		E8					²16	⁶32		⁸32	³16	⁵16	⁵32		~~⁷32~~						¹⁰16	³16	⁷✖	⁵✖	⁴16	²16	³32	³F4	**¹CH**	⁶16	⁴32			⁴32		¹⁰32	⁴32					⁴32	⁵16	⁶✖		⁶32	¹⁰32		⁸32		⁴16	
**Holy Cross**	Patriot	**13**	**4**	**4**	**2**	**1**	**1**									**CH**	F4		E8			E8			25																					32			¹¹✖													¹³✖								¹⁵✖	¹⁶✖	¹⁴✖				¹³✖									¹⁶✖									
**Stanford**	ACC	**17**	**6**	**3**	**2**	**1**	**1**				**CH**																																															³✖			¹²✖			¹⁰32	⁹32	⁶16	³F4	²32	¹32	¹E8	⁸32	⁴32	¹32	⁸✖		¹¹✖	³16						¹⁰16											
**Loyola Chicago**	Atlantic 10	**8**	**5**	**2**	**2**	**1**	**1**																									**CH**	16		22		23																	⁴16																																	¹¹F4		⁸16	¹⁰✖				
CCNY	D3	**2**	**2**	**2**	**2**	**1**	**1**									F4			**CH**																																																																											
**Wyoming**	Mountain West	**16**	**9**	**6**	**1**	**1**	**1**			E8		**CH**				E8	E8	E8			E8	16					24									16														⁵32	⁸32					¹²16	⁷✖														¹¹32													¹²✖						¹²ƒ				
**UTEP**	Mountain West	**17**	**4**	**1**	**1**	**1**	**1**																									25	16		**CH**	16			25					32									⁴32	¹¹32	¹⁰✖	⁷32	⁹✖	⁷32	¹¹✖		⁹16												¹³✖	¹¹✖					¹²✖															
**Houston**	Big 12	**27**	**18**	**8**	**7**	**3**	-																		16					16				16	16	F4	F4		16	16	25	25					⁴32			⁸✖	⁶F4	¹RU	²RU			¹²✖			⁸✖		¹⁰✖																		¹³✖								⁶32	³16	²F4	⁵E8	¹16	¹16	¹RU	²16
**Oklahoma**	SEC	**34**	**14**	**9**	**5**	**2**	-	F4				E8				RU																																⁵16				⁷32	²32	¹E8	⁴32	⁶16	¹RU	¹16	¹32		⁴✖			⁴✖	¹⁰✖	¹¹✖	¹⁰✖	¹³16	³32	⁴✖	²F4	¹E8		³32	⁶✖		⁶32	²E8				¹⁰✖	⁵✖	³16	²F4		¹⁰✖	⁹32	⁸32				⁹✖	
**Purdue**	Big Ten	**36**	**16**	**7**	**3**	**2**	-																															RU								32			⁶F4			⁵32	³32	⁶✖	⁶✖	³32	¹16		²32	⁷✖		⁹✖	¹E8	³32	~~¹32~~	⁸32	²16	¹⁰16	⁶E8			⁹32				⁹32	⁶32	⁵16	⁴16	³32	¹⁰32			⁹✖	⁵✖	⁴16	²16	³E8	⁴✖	³16	¹✖	¹RU	⁴16	²E8
**Gonzaga**	Pac-12	**28**	**14**	**6**	**2**	**2**	-																																																									¹⁴✖				¹⁰E8	¹⁰16	¹²16	⁶✖	⁹32	²32	³32	³16	¹⁰✖	⁷✖	⁴16	⁸32	¹¹32	⁷32	¹32	⁸32	²E8	¹¹16	¹RU	⁴16	¹E8	¹RU	¹16	³E8	⁵16	⁸32	³32
**Dartmouth**	Ivy League	**7**	**6**	**5**	**2**	**2**	-			E8	RU	E8	RU												16		E8	23																																																																		
**Bradley**	Missouri Valley	**9**	**4**	**3**	**2**	**2**	-												RU				RU	E8																									¹¹✖						⁷32		⁹✖								⁸✖										¹³16													¹⁵✖						
**Butler**	Big East	**16**	**6**	**2**	**2**	**2**	-																								16																																			¹⁴✖	¹³✖		¹²✖	¹⁰32		¹²16				⁵16	⁷32	⁹✖	⁵RU	⁸RU		⁶32		⁶32	⁹32	⁴16	¹⁰32							
**Illinois**	Big Ten	**36**	**15**	**11**	**6**	**1**	-				E8							F4		F4	F4											E8																		⁴16		⁷✖	²E8	³16	⁴32	³✖	³32	¹F4	⁵✖			⁶32	⁸✖	¹¹✖		⁶32	⁵32		⁴32	¹E8	⁴16	⁴32	⁵16	¹RU	⁴32	¹²✖		⁵✖		⁹32		⁷32							¹32	⁴32	⁹✖	³E8	⁶32	³F4
**Kansas State**	Big 12	**32**	**19**	**14**	**4**	**1**	-										F4			RU					16		F4	E8		E8			F4				16		16		E8	E8		E8		16			⁷32	⁸E8	⁵16					⁹32	⁴E8	⁶✖	¹¹✖			⁶✖			¹⁰✖												¹¹32		²E8	⁵32	⁸32	⁴✖	⁹✖			¹¹✖	⁹E8	⁴✖			³E8			
**Iowa**	Big Ten	**30**	**9**	**5**	**3**	**1**	-																	F4	RU														16									⁴32	⁵F4	³32	⁶32	⁷16		⁸✖	¹¹✖	²E8	⁵16	⁴32		⁷32	⁹32	⁴32			⁶32	⁸32		⁵16		⁷32				¹⁰✖	³✖								¹¹ƒ	⁷32	⁷32			¹⁰32	²32	⁵✖	⁸✖			⁹E8
**St. John's**	Big East	**31**	**10**	**6**	**2**	**1**	-													E8	RU									24						16	23	16				25			32	32	⁴32	¹⁰E8	³32		⁵32	¹16	⁹✖	¹F4	¹32	⁶32	¹¹✖		⁶32	⁴E8	⁷✖	⁵32					⁷✖	³E8	²32		~~⁹✖~~									⁶✖				⁹✖				¹¹ƒ					²32	⁵16
**Georgia Tech**	ACC	**17**	**7**	**4**	**2**	**1**	-																						E8																									²E8	²16	⁷✖	⁵32	⁶✖	⁴F4	⁸32	⁷16	⁴✖			³16					⁸✖			³RU	⁵32		¹⁰✖			¹⁰32										⁹✖					
NYU	D3	**6**	**6**	**4**	**2**	**1**	-					E8		RU	E8														F4		16	16																																																														
**West Virginia**	Big 12	**31**	**11**	**3**	**2**	**1**	-																	24	25	23	24	RU	16		25	16		23		23															⁵32	⁷✖	¹¹32		⁹✖	⁷✖		⁷32			¹²✖						¹⁰16							⁷E8	⁶16		⁷16	⁶✖	²F4	⁵32	¹⁰✖			⁵16	³✖	⁴16	⁵16		³32		⁹✖			
**Memphis**	American	**23**	**6**	**4**	**1**	**1**	-																	24	25						25											RU			32						~~²16~~	~~⁴16~~	~~⁶16~~	~~²F4~~	~~³32~~		⁹32	⁵✖			⁶E8	¹⁰✖		⁶16	⁵✖							⁷✖	⁷32		¹E8	²E8	~~¹RU~~	²16		¹²✖	⁸✖	⁶32	⁸32							⁹32	⁸✖		⁵✖	
**Texas Tech**	Big 12	**21**	**8**	**3**	**1**	**1**	-																24		25					16	16											25			16									⁶✖	¹³✖							¹²✖			~~³16~~						⁶✖		⁸32	⁶16		¹⁰✖									⁸✖		³E8	³RU	⁶32	³16		⁶✖	³E8	⁵32
**Dayton**	Atlantic 10	**19**	**7**	**3**	**1**	**1**	-														16													16	16	RU		25	25				16										¹⁰E8	⁹✖					¹²32										¹¹✖			⁴✖	¹⁰✖					¹¹32					¹¹E8	¹¹32	⁷✖	⁷✖						⁷32		
**Florida State**	ACC	**18**	**7**	**3**	**1**	**1**	-																														23				RU						⁴32		⁸32								¹²✖	⁴✖		⁷32	³16	³E8					¹²32											⁵✖	⁹✖	¹⁰16	³32					³32	⁹E8	⁴16	⁴16					
**Seton Hall**	Big East	**14**	**4**	**2**	**1**	**1**	-																																																		⁸32	³RU		³E8	⁴16	²32	¹⁰✖						¹⁰16				⁸32		¹⁰✖										⁶✖	⁹✖	⁸32	¹⁰✖		⁸✖				
**Seattle**	West Coast	**11**	**5**	**1**	**1**	**1**	-															16	24	16	16		RU			24	25	25	16			23		25																																																								
**San Diego State**	Pac-12	**17**	**4**	**1**	**1**	**1**	-																																					32	32									¹³✖																	¹³✖				¹¹✖				¹¹✖	²16	⁶✖	⁷32	⁴16	⁸32			¹¹✖		⁶✖	⁸✖	⁵RU	⁵16	¹¹ƒ	
**Washington State**	Pac-12	**7**	**2**	**1**	**1**	**1**	-			RU																																							⁵✖			⁸32											⁸✖													³32	⁴16															⁷32		
**Jacksonville**	ASUN	**5**	**1**	**1**	**1**	**1**	-																																RU	25		25						⁹✖							⁸✖																																							
**Indiana State**	Missouri Valley	**4**	**1**	**1**	**1**	**1**	-																																									¹RU																					¹²✖	¹³32										¹⁴✖														
**LSU**	SEC	**24**	**10**	**6**	**4**	-	-															F4	16																									³16	¹E8	¹F4			⁷✖	⁴✖	¹¹F4	¹⁰E8	⁹✖	¹⁰✖	⁵32	⁶✖	⁷32	¹¹✖							⁴16			⁸✖		⁶✖	⁴F4			⁸32						⁹✖				³16	⁸32	⁶✖				
**Texas**	SEC	**40**	**15**	**8**	**3**	-	-	E8				F4				F4													16			16									16		25					⁴32										¹¹32	¹⁰E8	⁵32	⁸✖		⁶32	¹¹32	¹⁰32	¹⁰16		⁷✖	⁵32	⁶✖	⁶16	¹F4	³16	⁸✖	²E8	⁴32	²E8	⁷32	⁸✖	⁴32	¹¹✖		⁷32	¹¹✖	⁶✖		¹⁰✖		³✖	⁶32	²E8	⁷32	¹¹ƒ	¹¹16
**Temple**	American	**33**	**8**	**8**	**2**	-	-						E8												F4		F4						25			23			25		25							⁷✖					⁸32	⁸32	⁹32	²32	¹E8		¹¹✖	¹⁰E8	¹¹✖	⁷E8	⁴32	¹⁰✖	⁷32	⁹32	⁷✖	⁶E8	²32	¹¹E8							¹²✖	¹¹✖	⁵✖	⁷32	⁵✖	⁹32			¹⁰✖			¹¹ƒ						
**Oregon State**	Pac-12	**15**	**8**	**7**	**2**	-	-									E8		F4						E8							E8	F4	25		E8									16					~~²32~~	~~¹32~~	~~²E8~~		⁶✖	¹⁰✖			¹²✖	⁶✖	⁵✖																										⁷✖				¹²E8					
**Colorado**	Big 12	**16**	**8**	**6**	**2**	-	-		E8		F4				E8								16	F4							E8	E8						16																												⁹32						¹⁰✖									¹¹32	¹⁰✖	⁸✖		⁸✖				⁵32			¹⁰32		
**Providence**	Big East	**22**	**6**	**4**	**2**	-	-																										25	E8	22						25	F4	16			32	³32									⁶F4		¹²✖	⁹✖				⁸✖			¹⁰E8				¹⁰✖			⁵✖										¹¹✖	⁶✖	⁹32	¹¹ƒ	¹⁰✖			⁴16	¹¹✖			
**USC**	Big Ten	**20**	**6**	**4**	**2**	-	-		F4														F4						25	16																		⁷32			⁹✖			⁸✖						¹⁰✖	²32					¹¹✖				⁶E8	⁴✖					⁵16	~~⁶✖~~	¹⁰32		¹¹ƒ					⁸✖	¹¹32			⁶E8	⁷✖	¹⁰✖			
**Wichita State**	American	**16**	**6**	**4**	**2**	-	-																										E8	F4											32					⁶E8				¹¹✖		¹¹✖	¹²✖																		⁷16						⁵✖	⁹F4	¹32	⁷16	¹¹32	¹⁰32	⁴✖		¹¹ƒ					
**DePaul**	Big East	**18**	**9**	**3**	**2**	-	-					F4										16			25			16	16					16											16		¹E8	²F4	¹32	¹32	¹32		¹16	¹⁰✖	~~¹²16~~	~~³16~~	~~⁵32~~	~~¹²32~~		⁹✖	⁵✖								⁹✖				⁷32																					
**Auburn**	SEC	**14**	**6**	**3**	**2**	-	-																																														⁵✖	¹¹16	⁸E8	⁸32	⁸32											¹16	⁷32			¹⁰16															⁴32	⁵F4		²32	⁹32	⁴✖	¹F4	
**Notre Dame**	ACC	**37**	**17**	**7**	**1**	-	-															E8	E8			16	E8		25			25		23				25	16	16			16	16	16	16	²F4	¹E8	⁴32	²16				⁷32	³✖	⁵16	¹⁰✖	⁹32	¹⁰✖											⁶32	⁸32	⁵16				⁶✖	⁵32		⁶✖	²32	⁷✖	⁷✖		³E8	⁶E8	⁵32				¹¹32				
**Wake Forest**	ACC	**23**	**10**	**6**	**1**	-	-	E8														16								E8	F4															E8				⁴32	⁷32		⁴E8							⁵32	⁹✖	⁵16	⁵32	¹16	²E8	³32				⁷✖	⁷32	²32	⁴16	²32				⁴✖	⁹32							¹¹ƒ								
**Santa Clara**	West Coast	**12**	**7**	**5**	**1**	-	-														F4	E8	E8						16								E8	E8	16																	¹⁵✖						¹⁵32		¹²✖	¹⁰32																													¹⁰✖
**Washington**	Big Ten	**17**	**9**	**4**	**1**	-	-					E8					E8			E8		F4																							32								⁶16	⁵✖	¹²✖												¹¹16	⁷✖					⁸✖	¹16	⁵16			⁴32	¹¹16	⁷32								⁹32						
**Alabama**	SEC	**26**	**12**	**3**	**1**	-	-																																					32	16						⁴16	⁶✖	⁹✖	⁷16	⁵16	~~²16~~		⁶✖	⁷16	⁴16	⁵32		⁹32	⁵32							²32	¹⁰✖	⁸E8	⁵✖	¹⁰32						⁹✖						⁹32		²16	⁶✖	¹16	⁴F4	²E8	⁴16
**Pittsburgh**	ACC	**27**	**8**	**3**	**1**	-	-			F4																16	24					25											E8							¹⁰32	¹⁰✖			¹²✖		³32	²32	⁸✖		⁶32		⁹✖									³16	²16	³16	⁹✖	⁵32	³16	⁴32	¹E8	³32	¹32		⁸✖	⁹32		¹⁰✖						¹¹32			
**Penn**	Ivy League	**25**	**6**	**3**	**1**	-	-															16																	25	E8	E8	16	25	32			⁴16	⁹F4	¹²32		¹²✖			¹⁵✖		¹⁶✖						¹⁴✖	¹¹32	¹²✖				¹¹✖	¹³✖		¹¹✖	¹¹✖		¹³✖	¹⁵✖	¹⁴✖											¹⁶✖							¹⁴✖
**Drake**	Missouri Valley	**8**	**3**	**3**	**1**	-	-																															F4	E8	E8																																					⁵✖												¹¹✖		¹²✖	¹⁰✖	¹¹32	
**Iowa State**	Big 12	**25**	**9**	**2**	**1**	-	-						F4																																									¹³✖	⁷16		¹²✖	¹⁰✖			¹⁰32	⁸✖		⁷32	⁵32	⁶16			²E8	²✖				⁹32							⁸32	¹⁰32	³16	³✖	⁴16	⁵32		⁶✖		¹¹16	⁶✖	²16	³32	²16
**SMU**	ACC	**13**	**6**	**2**	**1**	-	-																	16	F4	16								16	16	E8																	⁹32	⁵32			⁷32					¹⁰✖																						⁶✖		⁶✖								¹¹ƒ
**Miami (FL)**	ACC	**13**	**5**	**2**	**1**	-	-																						25																																						¹¹✖	²32	⁶16		⁵✖						⁷32					²16			³16	⁸✖	⁶✖			¹⁰E8	⁵F4			⁷32
**Penn State**	Big Ten	**10**	**5**	**2**	**1**	-	-				E8										16		F4	16										23																										¹³32					⁵✖					⁷16										¹⁰✖											¹⁰32			
**Duquesne**	Atlantic 10	**6**	**3**	**2**	**1**	-	-		F4												E8																	16		25						32																																														¹¹32		
**Princeton**	Ivy League	**26**	**7**	**1**	**1**	-	-														16			16					25	16		25	16	F4		16		25							32	32				¹¹✖		¹²32	¹²✖					¹⁶✖	¹³✖	⁸✖	¹¹✖				¹³32	¹²✖	⁵32			¹⁵✖			¹⁴✖							¹³✖						¹²✖					¹⁵16			
**New Mexico State**	CUSA	**23**	**4**	**1**	**1**	-	-														16							23	25							23	16	16	F4	25				32				¹⁰✖											⁶✖	⁶✖	~~¹²16~~	~~⁷32~~	~~¹³✖~~					¹⁴✖								¹³✖			¹²✖		¹³✖	¹³✖	¹³✖	¹⁵✖		¹⁴✖	¹²✖	¹²✖		¹²32				
**South Carolina**	SEC	**10**	**4**	**1**	**1**	-	-																																	16	16	16	25															¹²✖								²✖	³✖						¹⁰✖													⁷F4						⁶✖		
**Mississippi State**	SEC	**14**	**3**	**1**	**1**	-	-																									16																												⁵✖				⁵16	⁵F4						³32	⁵✖	²32	⁹32			⁸32	¹³✖										⁵✖			¹¹ƒ	⁸✖	⁸✖	
**St. Bonaventure**	Atlantic 10	**8**	**3**	**1**	**1**	-	-																							16							16		F4								²32																						¹²✖												¹⁴✖						¹¹✖		⁹✖					
**Georgia**	SEC	**12**	**2**	**1**	**1**	-	-																																													⁴F4		~~⁶32~~		⁸✖			⁷✖	¹¹✖					⁸16	³✖				⁸✖	~~³32~~						¹⁴✖			¹⁰✖				¹⁰✖									⁹✖	⁸✖
**Rutgers**	Big Ten	**8**	**2**	**1**	**1**	-	-																																					32	F4			⁶16				⁹32						¹³✖		⁹✖																													¹⁰32	¹¹ƒ				
**VCU**	Atlantic 10	**21**	**1**	**1**	**1**	-	-																																										¹²✖	⁵32		⁵32	⁶32	²32											¹²✖								¹³✖			¹¹32		¹¹✖		¹¹F4	¹²32	⁵32	⁵✖	⁷✖	¹⁰32	¹⁰✖		⁸✖	¹⁰✖		¹²✖		¹¹✖	¹¹32
**Charlotte**	American	**11**	**1**	**1**	**1**	-	-																																							F4											¹³✖				⁷✖			⁷✖		⁷32	⁸32	⁵32		⁹32	⁹✖		⁹✖	⁷✖																				
**George Mason**	Atlantic 10	**6**	**1**	**1**	**1**	-	-																																																			¹⁵✖										¹⁴✖		¹⁴✖					¹¹F4		¹²✖			⁸32														
**Florida Atlantic**	American	**3**	**1**	**1**	**1**	-	-																																																																¹⁵✖																				⁹F4	⁸✖		
**Tennessee**	SEC	**28**	**12**	**4**	-	-	-																													16									32	32		⁸32	⁷32	⁴16	⁹32	⁸32						¹⁰✖									⁸✖	⁴32	⁴16	⁸✖					²32	⁵16	²16	⁹✖	⁶E8	⁹✖			¹¹16				³32	²16	⁵✖	³32	⁴16	²E8	²E8	⁶E8
**Missouri**	SEC	**30**	**7**	**4**	-	-	-						E8																																E8		¹32		⁵16	⁹✖	²16	²32			¹¹✖	⁴✖	⁶✖	³16	³✖		⁵32	¹⁰✖	~~¹E8~~	⁸32				⁸✖	⁹✖	⁹32	¹²E8	⁶32						³E8	¹⁰32	¹¹✖	²✖	⁹✖					⁸✖		⁹✖		⁷32		⁶✖	¹⁰✖
**Xavier**	Big East	**30**	**9**	**3**	-	-	-																							24																						¹²ƒ			¹²✖	¹³32	¹¹✖	¹⁴✖	⁶16	¹⁴32		⁹32		¹¹✖		⁷32	⁶✖			¹¹✖	⁷32	³32	⁷E8		¹⁴✖	⁹32	³E8	⁴16	⁶16	⁶✖	¹⁰16		¹²ƒ	⁶16	²32	¹¹E8	¹32				³16		¹¹✖	
**Saint Joseph's**	Atlantic 10	**20**	**9**	**3**	-	-	-																					16	16	~~F4~~	16	E8		16	16			25		25		25	25							⁹E8	⁶✖				⁶32											⁴16				⁹32		⁷✖	¹E8				¹¹✖						¹⁰✖		⁸32									
**BYU**	Big 12	**33**	**8**	**3**	-	-	-												E8	E8						16								16				25		16	25							⁵32	³32	⁶E8			⁸32			¹⁰✖	⁴32		¹²✖	¹⁰32	¹⁰✖	⁷32		⁸✖						¹²✖		¹²✖	¹²✖			⁸✖	⁸✖	⁸✖	⁷32	³16	¹⁴✖		¹⁰✖	¹¹ƒ					⁶✖			⁶✖	⁶16	⁶✖
**Boston College**	ACC	**18**	**8**	**3**	-	-	-																				24									E8	23							16						⁵16	⁸E8	⁴16		¹¹16									⁹E8		¹¹32	⁵32				³32	¹¹✖		⁶32	⁴32	⁴16	⁷32		⁷✖																
**Arizona State**	Big 12	**16**	**4**	**3**	-	-	-																				24			E8	25	E8	25									16		E8					⁵32	²32										⁸32				~~⁵16~~								¹⁰32						⁶32					¹⁰✖				¹¹ƒ	¹¹✖			¹¹✖			
**Davidson**	Atlantic 10	**15**	**4**	**3**	-	-	-																												16		E8	E8	25																¹⁶✖												¹⁴✖				¹³✖				¹⁵✖	¹³✖	¹⁰E8				¹³✖	¹⁴✖		¹⁰✖			¹²✖			¹⁰✖				
**Navy**	Patriot	**11**	**4**	**3**	-	-	-									E8						22	E8					16	25																									¹³32	⁷E8	⁸✖							¹⁶✖			¹⁵✖		¹⁶✖																										
**Creighton**	Big East	**26**	**7**	**2**	-	-	-			E8																					16		16										16	32			³32			⁸✖								¹⁴✖		¹¹32								¹⁰32	¹⁰✖	¹⁰✖	¹²32	⁶✖		¹⁰✖		¹⁰✖					⁸32	⁷32	³32			⁶✖	⁸✖		⁵16	⁹32	⁶E8	³16	⁹32	
Oklahoma City	NAIA	**11**	**6**	**2**	-	-	-														16	16	24	24	E8	E8						16	25	16	22							25																																																				
**Utah State**	Pac-12	**26**	**4**	**2**	-	-	-	E8																							16	25	16						E8	25				32				¹⁰✖	¹¹✖			¹⁰✖					¹⁰✖										¹³✖		¹²✖	¹²32		¹⁵✖		¹⁴✖	¹²✖			¹¹✖	¹²✖	¹²✖								⁸✖	¹¹✖		¹⁰✖	⁸32	¹⁰✖	⁹32
**Clemson**	ACC	**15**	**4**	**2**	-	-	-																																										⁶E8							⁴✖		⁹32	~~⁵16~~						⁹✖	⁴16	⁶✖										⁵✖	⁷✖	⁷✖	¹²✖							⁵16		⁷✖			⁶E8	⁵✖	⁸✖
**Rice**	American	**4**	**3**	**2**	-	-	-		E8		E8												16																25																																																							
**Canisius**	Metro	**4**	**3**	**2**	-	-	-																	E8	E8	16																																							¹³✖																													
**Western Kentucky**	CUSA	**23**	**7**	**1**	-	-	-		E8																				16		16				16	23			25	~~F4~~					32		⁴16		¹⁰✖	¹⁰✖					⁸32	¹⁰32						⁷16	¹¹✖	⁸32						¹⁴✖	⁹✖	¹³✖					¹²16	¹²32			¹⁶✖	¹⁶✖										¹⁵✖		
**Vanderbilt**	SEC	**17**	**6**	**1**	-	-	-																											E8									16														⁷16	⁸✖		⁹✖		³16				¹⁰✖							⁶16			⁶16	⁴✖		⁴✖	⁵✖	⁵32				¹¹ƒ	⁹✖							¹⁰✖	⁵32
**Idaho State**	Big Sky	**11**	**5**	**1**	-	-	-															22	16	24	25	16	16	16	25														25			E8										¹⁶✖																																						
**Tulsa**	American	**16**	**4**	**1**	-	-	-																	16																											³32		⁴32	⁶✖	¹⁰✖	¹¹✖							¹²16	⁶16	¹¹✖	⁵32		⁹32	⁷E8		¹²32	¹³32											¹³✖		¹¹ƒ									
**TCU**	Big 12	**12**	**4**	**1**	-	-	-														16	16						16									E8			25																⁴32											⁵✖																				⁶✖			⁹32	⁶32	⁹✖		⁹32
**UAB**	American	**17**	**3**	**1**	-	-	-																																											⁷16	⁴E8	¹⁰✖	⁹✖	⁷32	⁶32	¹¹✖			¹⁰✖				⁷✖					¹²✖					⁹16	¹¹32	⁹✖					¹²ƒ				¹⁴32						¹²✖		¹²✖		
**Ohio**	MAC	**14**	**3**	**1**	-	-	-																						16	24			E8	23					25		25		25									¹¹32		¹⁴✖									¹²✖											¹³✖					¹⁴32		¹³16								¹³32					
**Pepperdine**	West Coast	**13**	**3**	**1**	-	-	-						E8																		16														16			⁹32			⁷32	¹¹✖		¹⁴✖	¹²✖					¹⁴✖	¹¹✖		¹⁴✖						¹¹32		¹⁰✖																							
**Minnesota**	Big Ten	**10**	**3**	**1**	-	-	-																																		~~16~~										²16							¹¹16	⁶E8				~~⁶32~~	~~⁸✖~~		~~¹F4~~		⁷✖						⁸✖				¹⁰✖	¹¹✖			¹¹32				⁵✖		¹⁰32						
**Pacific**	West Coast	**9**	**3**	**1**	-	-	-																												16	E8				16								⁶32																		¹³✖							¹²32	⁸32	¹³✖							¹⁵✖												
**Columbia**	Ivy League	**3**	**3**	**1**	-	-	-										E8			16																	16																																																									
**Saint Mary's**	West Coast	**15**	**2**	**1**	-	-	-																					E8																														⁸✖								¹⁴✖								¹⁰✖			¹⁰✖		¹⁰16		⁷✖	¹¹✖				⁷32		¹¹✖		⁵32	⁵32	⁵✖	⁷32	⁷✖
**Colorado State**	Pac-12	**13**	**2**	**1**	-	-	-																16									25		23	22			E8																				¹⁰32	¹⁰✖													¹⁴✖									¹¹✖	⁸32								⁶✖		¹⁰✖	¹²32	
**Virginia Tech**	ACC	**13**	**2**	**1**	-	-	-																													E8									32			⁸32	⁷32					⁹✖	⁷✖										⁹32											⁵32										⁹✖	⁸✖	⁴16	¹⁰✖	¹¹✖				
**Saint Louis**	Atlantic 10	**11**	**2**	**1**	-	-	-														E8					16																																					⁷✖	⁹32			¹⁰32		⁹✖												⁹32	⁴32	⁵32					¹³✖						⁹32
**Rhode Island**	Atlantic 10	**10**	**2**	**1**	-	-	-																							24					22												³32										¹¹16					⁸32				⁹✖	⁸E8	¹²✖																		¹¹32	⁷32							
**UMass**	MAC	**8**	**2**	**1**	-	-	-																								25																														³16	³32	²32	²E8	~~¹F4~~	¹¹✖	⁷✖																⁶✖											
**Oral Roberts**	Summit	**7**	**2**	**1**	-	-	-																																				E8										¹¹✖																						¹⁶✖	¹⁴✖	¹³✖												¹⁵16		¹²✖			
**Loyola Marymount**	West Coast	**4**	**2**	**1**	-	-	-																							16																			~~¹²✖~~								¹⁰32	¹²✖	¹¹E8																																			
**VMI**	SoCon	**3**	**2**	**1**	-	-	-																										25												E8	16																																																
**Yale**	Ivy League	**8**	**1**	**1**	-	-	-											E8								23					25																																																						¹²32			¹⁴✖		¹⁴✖		¹³32	¹³✖	
**Boston University**	Patriot	**7**	**1**	**1**	-	-	-																					E8																								¹²ƒ					¹⁵✖		¹⁶✖							¹²✖					¹⁶✖									¹⁶✖														
**Kent State**	MAC	**7**	**1**	**1**	-	-	-																																																													¹¹✖		¹³32	¹⁰E8				¹²✖		⁹✖									¹⁴✖					¹³✖			
**Harvard**	Ivy League	**5**	**1**	**1**	-	-	-								E8																																																																		¹²✖	¹⁴32	¹²32	¹³✖										
**Saint Peter's**	Metro	**5**	**1**	**1**	-	-	-																																																					¹²✖				¹⁵✖																¹⁴✖										¹⁵E8		¹⁵✖		
**Cal State Fullerton**	Big West	**4**	**1**	**1**	-	-	-																																								⁴E8																														¹⁴✖										¹⁵✖			¹⁵✖				
**Brown**	Ivy League	**2**	**1**	**1**	-	-	-	E8																																															¹⁵✖																																							
Springfield	D3	**1**	**1**	**1**	-	-	-		E8																																																																																					
Catholic	D3	**1**	**1**	**1**	-	-	-						E8																																																																																	
Tufts	D3	**1**	**1**	**1**	-	-	-							E8																																																																																
**Texas A&M**	SEC	**18**	**6**	-	-	-	-													16													25					16						32					⁶16							¹²✖																			¹²32	³16	⁹32	⁹32	⁵32	⁷✖					³16		⁷16				⁷✖	⁹32	⁴32	¹⁰32
**Miami (OH)**	MAC	**18**	**4**	-	-	-	-															22		24		23	16								22			16		25		25					³16						⁸✖	¹²✖	¹⁰✖						¹³✖			¹²32		¹³✖		¹⁰16								¹⁴✖																		¹¹✖
**Southern Illinois**	Missouri Valley	**10**	**3**	-	-	-	-																																							16																¹⁴✖	¹¹✖	¹⁰✖							¹¹16	¹¹✖	⁹✖	⁷32	¹¹✖	⁴16																		
**New Mexico**	Mountain West	**17**	**2**	-	-	-	-																														16						16				²32													¹⁴✖		⁵✖	¹⁰✖		⁷32	³32	⁴32	⁹32						¹²✖					³32		⁵32	³✖	⁷✖									¹¹✖	¹⁰32	
**Weber State**	Big Sky	**16**	**2**	-	-	-	-																														23	16	25	25	16	25					⁴32	⁷32	⁷✖			⁹✖												¹⁴32				¹⁴32				¹²✖				¹⁵✖							¹⁶✖		¹⁵✖									
**Nevada**	Mountain West	**11**	**2**	-	-	-	-																																														¹¹✖	¹⁴✖																			¹⁰16	⁹32	⁵✖	⁷32										¹²✖	⁷16	⁷✖			¹¹ƒ	¹⁰✖		
**Ole Miss**	SEC	**10**	**2**	-	-	-	-																																											¹⁰✖																⁸✖	⁴✖	⁹32		³16	⁹✖											¹²32		¹¹✖				⁸✖					⁶16	
**Richmond**	Atlantic 10	**10**	**2**	-	-	-	-																																														¹²32		¹¹✖		¹³16		¹⁴✖	¹⁵32							¹⁴32						¹¹✖						⁷✖	¹²16										¹²32				
**Morehead State**	Ohio Valley	**9**	**2**	-	-	-	-																		16	23				16																						¹¹✖	¹²✖																									¹⁶✖		¹³32									¹⁴✖			¹⁴✖		
**Cornell**	Ivy League	**5**	**2**	-	-	-	-																16																																		¹⁶✖																				¹⁴✖	¹⁴✖	¹²16															
**Montana**	Big Sky	**13**	**1**	-	-	-	-																																					16																¹⁶✖	¹⁴✖					¹⁶✖					¹⁵✖			¹⁶✖	¹²32				¹⁴✖		¹³✖	¹³✖					¹⁴✖	¹⁵✖					¹⁴✖	
**Chattanooga**	SoCon	**12**	**1**	-	-	-	-																																											¹¹✖	¹⁰32	⁹✖					¹⁶✖					¹²✖	¹³✖	¹⁵✖		¹⁴16								¹⁵✖				¹⁶✖							¹²✖					¹³✖				
**George Washington**	Atlantic 10	**11**	**1**	-	-	-	-																24							24																																¹²16	¹⁰32		¹¹✖		⁹✖	¹¹✖						¹²✖	⁸32	¹¹✖							⁹✖											
**East Tennessee State**	SoCon	**10**	**1**	-	-	-	-																														16																					¹⁶✖	¹³✖	¹⁰✖	¹⁴32											¹⁵✖	¹³✖					¹⁶✖	¹⁶✖							¹³✖								
**Nebraska**	Big Ten	**9**	**1**	-	-	-	-																																																⁹✖					³✖	⁸✖	¹⁰✖	⁶✖				¹¹✖																¹¹✖									⁸✖		⁴16
**Northern Iowa**	Missouri Valley	**9**	**1**	-	-	-	-																																																				¹⁴32														¹⁴✖	¹¹✖	¹⁰✖			¹²✖	⁹16					⁵32	¹¹32									¹²✖
**Valparaiso**	Missouri Valley	**9**	**1**	-	-	-	-																																																										¹⁴✖	¹²✖	¹³16	¹⁵✖	¹⁶✖		¹³✖		¹⁵✖									¹⁴✖		¹³✖										
**Manhattan**	Metro	**8**	**1**	-	-	-	-																		25		16																																			¹¹✖		¹³32								¹⁴✖	¹²32										¹³✖	¹⁶ƒ										
**Furman**	SoCon	**8**	**1**	-	-	-	-																																	25		25	16	32			³32		¹⁰✖																																										¹³32			¹⁵✖
**Long Beach State**	Big West	**7**	**1**	-	-	-	-																																16	~~E8~~	~~E8~~	~~16~~				32																¹¹✖		¹³✖												¹²✖					¹²✖											¹⁵✖		
**Ball State**	MAC	**7**	**1**	-	-	-	-																																											¹²✖					¹⁴✖			⁹32	¹²16			¹⁵✖		¹²✖					¹¹✖																									
**Montana State**	Big Sky	**6**	**1**	-	-	-	-													16																																			¹⁶✖										¹³✖																									¹⁴✖	¹⁴✖	¹⁶ƒ		
**Detroit Mercy**	Horizon	**6**	**1**	-	-	-	-																								25															16		⁷✖																			¹⁰32	¹²32													¹⁵✖													
**Lamar**	Southland	**6**	**1**	-	-	-	-																																									¹⁰32	¹⁰16	⁸32		¹¹32																	¹⁶✖												¹⁶ƒ													
**Missouri State**	CUSA	**6**	**1**	-	-	-	-																																																	¹³32	¹³✖	¹⁴✖	⁹✖		¹²✖							¹²16																										
**Fresno State**	Pac-12	**5**	**1**	-	-	-	-																																											⁶✖	⁴16		⁷✖																~~⁹✖~~	⁹32															¹⁴✖									
**Idaho**	Big Sky	**5**	**1**	-	-	-	-																																											⁷✖	³16							¹³✖	¹³✖																																			¹⁵✖
**Louisiana Tech**	Sun Belt	**5**	**1**	-	-	-	-																																														¹⁰32	⁵16		¹⁴✖		⁹32		¹²✖																																		
**Fordham**	Atlantic 10	**4**	**1**	-	-	-	-															22	24																	16																					¹⁴✖																																	
**Toledo**	MAC	**4**	**1**	-	-	-	-																24													23												⁵16	⁹✖																																													
**Lafayette**	Patriot	**4**	**1**	-	-	-	-																			16																																										¹⁵✖	¹⁵✖															¹⁶✖										
**Bowling Green**	MAC	**4**	**1**	-	-	-	-																					23			25	16					23																																																									
**Central Michigan**	MAC	**4**	**1**	-	-	-	-																																					16		32										¹³✖																¹¹32																						
**Western Michigan**	MAC	**4**	**1**	-	-	-	-																																						16																						¹¹32						¹¹✖										¹⁴✖											
**Eastern Michigan**	MAC	**4**	**1**	-	-	-	-																																																		¹⁵✖			¹²16					⁹32		¹³✖																											
**Milwaukee**	Horizon	**4**	**1**	-	-	-	-																																																																	¹²✖		¹²16	¹¹32								¹⁵✖											
**San Jose State**	Mountain West	**3**	**1**	-	-	-	-													16																													¹²✖																¹⁶✖																													
**Niagara**	Metro	**3**	**1**	-	-	-	-																																16																																			¹⁴✖		¹⁶✖																		
**Cleveland State**	Horizon	**3**	**1**	-	-	-	-																																																¹⁴16																							¹³32											¹⁵✖					
**Florida Gulf Coast**	ASUN	**3**	**1**	-	-	-	-																																																																											¹⁵16			¹⁶✖	¹⁴✖								
Lebanon Valley	D3	**1**	**1**	-	-	-	-															16																																																																								
Wayne State (MI)	D2	**1**	**1**	-	-	-	-																		16																																																																					
**Murray State**	Missouri Valley	**18**	-	-	-	-	-																										25					25																			¹⁴32		¹⁶✖	¹³✖	¹⁴✖			¹⁵✖		¹⁵✖	⁹✖	¹³✖			¹⁴✖		¹²✖		¹⁴✖				¹³32		⁶32						¹²✖	¹²32		⁷32				
**Iona**	Metro	**15**	-	-	-	-	-																																									⁸✖	~~⁶32~~				¹⁰✖	¹³✖													¹²✖		¹⁴✖	¹⁴✖					¹³✖						¹⁴ƒ	¹⁵✖			¹³✖	¹⁴✖	¹⁵✖	¹⁶✖	¹⁵✖		¹³✖			
**Old Dominion**	Sun Belt	**12**	-	-	-	-	-																																										⁹✖		¹⁰✖			¹²✖	⁸32						¹⁵✖			¹⁴32		¹⁴✖								¹²✖		¹²✖			¹¹32	⁹✖								¹⁴✖						
**Texas Southern**	SWAC	**11**	-	-	-	-	-																																																				¹⁴✖				¹⁵✖	¹⁵✖								¹⁶ƒ											¹⁶ƒ	¹⁵✖		¹⁶✖	¹⁶✖		¹⁶✖	¹⁶✖	¹⁶ƒ			
**Winthrop**	Big South	**11**	-	-	-	-	-																																																													¹⁶✖	¹⁴✖	¹⁶ƒ	¹⁶✖			¹⁴✖	¹⁵✖	¹¹32	¹³✖		¹⁶ƒ							¹³✖			¹²✖					
**Boise State**	Pac-12	**10**	-	-	-	-	-																																						32												¹⁴✖					¹⁴✖	¹⁴✖														¹⁴✖					¹³ƒ		¹¹ƒ						⁸✖	¹⁰✖	¹⁰ƒ		
**North Carolina A&T**	CAA	**10**	-	-	-	-	-																																												¹²✖	¹²ƒ	¹²ƒ	¹⁶✖	¹⁶✖	¹⁵✖	¹⁴✖						¹⁶✖	¹⁶✖																		¹⁶✖												
**Vermont**	America East	**10**	-	-	-	-	-																																																																	¹⁶✖	¹⁵✖	¹³32					¹⁶✖		¹⁶✖					¹³✖		¹³✖		¹³✖	¹⁵✖	¹³✖		
**Middle Tennessee**	CUSA	**9**	-	-	-	-	-																																					32		32					¹¹32			¹⁵✖		¹²✖		¹³32																								¹¹ƒ			¹⁵32	¹²32								
**Northeastern**	CAA	**9**	-	-	-	-	-																																											¹¹32	¹¹32		¹¹✖	¹⁴✖	¹³✖	¹⁴✖				¹⁶✖																								¹⁴✖				¹³✖						
**Southern**	SWAC	**9**	-	-	-	-	-																																											¹¹✖				¹⁶✖		¹⁵✖	¹⁵✖	¹⁵✖				¹³32													¹⁶✖							¹⁶✖			¹⁶ƒ									
**Robert Morris**	Horizon	**9**	-	-	-	-	-																																												¹²✖	¹²✖						¹⁶✖	¹⁵✖		¹⁶✖																	¹⁵✖	¹⁵✖					¹⁶✖									¹⁵✖	
**Akron**	MAC	**8**	-	-	-	-	-																																																¹⁵✖																							¹³✖		¹⁵✖		¹²✖								¹³✖		¹⁴✖	¹³✖	¹²✖
**Eastern Kentucky**	UAC	**8**	-	-	-	-	-															22						23						23							25							⁹✖																										¹⁵✖		¹⁶✖							¹⁵✖											
**South Alabama**	Sun Belt	**8**	-	-	-	-	-																																									⁶32	⁹✖									¹¹32		¹³✖						¹³✖	¹²✖								¹⁴✖		¹⁰✖																	
**LIU**	NEC	**8**	-	-	-	-	-																																											¹²✖			¹¹ƒ													¹³✖														¹⁵✖	¹⁶✖	¹⁶ƒ					¹⁶ƒ							¹⁶✖
**Bucknell**	Patriot	**8**	-	-	-	-	-																																																	¹⁶✖		¹⁵✖																¹⁴32	⁹32					¹⁴✖		¹¹✖				¹³✖	¹⁴✖							
**Belmont**	Missouri Valley	**8**	-	-	-	-	-																																																																				¹⁵✖	¹⁵✖	¹⁵✖			¹³✖	¹⁴✖	¹¹✖		¹⁵✖				¹¹✖						
**Louisiana**	Sun Belt	**7**	-	-	-	-	-																																		~~16~~	~~16~~									⁸✖	⁸✖									¹³32		¹¹✖						¹³✖				~~¹⁴✖~~	~~¹³✖~~									¹⁴✖								¹³✖			
**Louisiana–Monroe**	Sun Belt	**7**	-	-	-	-	-																																												¹¹✖				¹³✖				¹⁵✖	¹⁵✖	¹⁵✖	¹³✖			¹⁵✖																													
**Fairleigh Dickinson**	NEC	**7**	-	-	-	-	-																																															¹⁶✖			¹⁶✖										¹⁵✖							¹⁶✖											¹⁶ƒ			¹⁶✖			¹⁶32			
**Siena**	Metro	**7**	-	-	-	-	-																																																			¹⁴32										¹³✖			¹⁶✖						¹³32	⁹32	¹³✖															¹⁶✖
**UC Santa Barbara**	Big West	**7**	-	-	-	-	-																																																		¹⁰✖		⁹32												¹⁴✖								¹⁵✖	¹⁵✖									¹²✖		¹⁴✖			
**Charleston**	CAA	**7**	-	-	-	-	-																																																								¹²✖			¹²32	¹⁴✖	⁸✖																			¹³✖				¹²✖	¹³✖		
**Colgate**	Patriot	**7**	-	-	-	-	-																																																									¹⁶✖	¹⁶✖																							¹⁵✖	¹⁴✖	¹⁴✖	¹⁵✖	¹⁴✖		
**Mount St. Mary's**	Metro	**7**	-	-	-	-	-																																																									¹⁶✖				¹⁶✖									¹⁶✖						¹⁶ƒ			¹⁶✖			¹⁶ƒ				¹⁶✖	
**UNC Wilmington**	CAA	**7**	-	-	-	-	-																																																														¹⁵✖		¹³32	¹¹✖			⁹✖										¹³✖	¹²✖							¹⁴✖	
**South Dakota State**	Summit	**7**	-	-	-	-	-																																																																										¹⁴✖	¹³✖			¹²✖	¹⁶✖	¹²✖			¹³✖		¹⁵✖		
**Hawaii**	Mountain West	**6**	-	-	-	-	-																																		25																						¹³✖							¹²✖	¹⁰✖														¹³32									¹³✖
**Austin Peay**	UAC	**6**	-	-	-	-	-																																			~~16~~	25													¹⁴32									¹⁴✖							¹³✖					¹⁵✖								¹⁶✖									
**Alcorn State**	SWAC	**6**	-	-	-	-	-																																										⁸32		¹¹✖	¹²✖	¹²✖															¹⁵✖			¹⁶ƒ																							
**James Madison**	Sun Belt	**6**	-	-	-	-	-																																											¹⁰32	⁹32	¹⁰32											¹⁴✖																			¹⁶✖										¹²32		
**Illinois State**	Missouri Valley	**6**	-	-	-	-	-																																													⁶✖	⁸32	⁹32					¹⁴✖							¹¹✖	⁹32																											
**Lehigh**	Patriot	**6**	-	-	-	-	-																																															¹⁶✖			¹⁶✖																¹⁶ƒ						¹⁶✖		¹⁵32													¹⁶ƒ
**Georgia State**	Sun Belt	**6**	-	-	-	-	-																																																					¹⁶✖										¹¹32														¹⁴32			¹⁵✖	¹⁴✖		¹⁶✖				
**Delaware**	CUSA	**6**	-	-	-	-	-																																																						¹³✖	¹³✖					¹⁵✖	¹³✖															¹³✖							¹⁵✖				
**Liberty**	CUSA	**6**	-	-	-	-	-																																																								¹⁶✖										¹⁶✖									¹⁶ƒ						¹²32	¹³✖				¹²✖	
**UCF**	Big 12	**6**	-	-	-	-	-																																																								¹⁶✖		¹⁶✖								¹⁴✖	¹⁵✖														⁹32						¹⁰✖
**Hampton**	CAA	**6**	-	-	-	-	-																																																															¹⁵32	¹⁵✖				¹⁶ƒ					¹⁶✖				¹⁶✖	¹⁶✖									
**Wofford**	SoCon	**6**	-	-	-	-	-																																																																								¹³✖	¹⁴✖			¹⁵✖	¹²✖				⁷32					¹⁵✖	
**Marshall**	Sun Belt	**5**	-	-	-	-	-																		25																25												¹⁰✖	¹⁵✖		~~¹³✖~~																															¹³32							
**Hofstra**	CAA	**5**	-	-	-	-	-																																						32	32																							¹⁴✖	¹³✖																								¹³✖
**Evansville**	Missouri Valley	**5**	-	-	-	-	-																																												¹⁰✖							¹¹32			⁸✖	¹⁴✖						¹¹✖																										
**Howard**	MEAC	**5**	-	-	-	-	-																																											¹²✖											¹⁶✖																														¹⁶✖	¹⁶ƒ		¹⁶✖
**Little Rock**	UAC	**5**	-	-	-	-	-																																																¹⁴32			¹³✖	¹⁶✖																					¹⁶ƒ					¹²32									
**Drexel**	CAA	**5**	-	-	-	-	-																																																¹⁵✖								¹³✖	¹³✖	¹²32																								¹⁶✖					
**LSU New Orleans**	Southland	**5**	-	-	-	-	-																																																	⁷32				¹⁴✖		⁸✖			¹¹✖																					¹⁶ƒ								
**Mississippi Valley State**	SWAC	**5**	-	-	-	-	-																																																¹⁶✖						¹⁶✖				¹⁵✖												¹⁶✖				¹⁶ƒ													
**McNeese**	Southland	**5**	-	-	-	-	-																																																			¹⁶✖													¹⁴✖																					¹²✖	¹²32	¹²✖
**South Carolina State**	MEAC	**5**	-	-	-	-	-																																																			¹⁵✖							¹⁵✖		¹⁵✖		¹⁶✖			¹⁶✖																						
**Green Bay**	Horizon	**5**	-	-	-	-	-																																																					¹²✖			¹²32	¹⁴✖	⁸✖																				¹⁴✖									
**Wright State**	Horizon	**5**	-	-	-	-	-																																																							¹⁶✖														¹⁴✖											¹⁴✖			¹⁶✖				¹⁴✖
**Alabama State**	SWAC	**5**	-	-	-	-	-																																																															¹⁶✖			¹⁶✖					¹⁶ƒ		¹⁶ƒ													¹⁶✖	
**UNC Asheville**	Big South	**5**	-	-	-	-	-																																																																	¹⁶✖								¹⁶✖	¹⁶✖				¹⁵✖						¹⁵✖			
**Albany**	America East	**5**	-	-	-	-	-																																																																				¹⁶✖	¹³✖						¹⁵✖	¹⁶✖	¹⁴✖										
**North Dakota State**	Summit	**5**	-	-	-	-	-																																																																							¹⁴✖					¹²32	¹⁵✖				¹⁶✖						¹⁴✖
**Air Force**	Mountain West	**4**	-	-	-	-	-																						25		25																																										¹¹✖		¹³✖																			
**San Diego**	West Coast	**4**	-	-	-	-	-																																														¹²ƒ			⁹✖																¹³✖					¹³32																	
**UTSA**	American	**4**	-	-	-	-	-																																																		¹⁴✖											¹⁶✖					¹⁶✖							¹⁶✖														
**North Texas**	American	**4**	-	-	-	-	-																																																		¹⁵✖																			¹⁵✖			¹⁵✖										¹³32					
**Coppin State**	MEAC	**4**	-	-	-	-	-																																																				¹⁵✖			¹⁵✖				¹⁵32											¹⁶ƒ																	
**South Florida**	American	**4**	-	-	-	-	-																																																				¹⁵✖		¹¹✖																				¹²32													¹¹✖
**Coastal Carolina**	Sun Belt	**4**	-	-	-	-	-																																																					¹⁵✖		¹⁶✖																					¹⁶✖	¹⁶✖										
**Monmouth**	CAA	**4**	-	-	-	-	-																																																										¹³✖					¹⁶✖			¹⁵✖		¹⁶✖																			
**UNC Greensboro**	SoCon	**4**	-	-	-	-	-																																																										¹⁵✖					¹⁶✖																	¹³✖		¹³✖					
**Troy**	Sun Belt	**4**	-	-	-	-	-																																																																	¹⁴✖														¹⁵✖							¹⁴✖	¹³✖
**Oakland**	Horizon	**4**	-	-	-	-	-																																																																			¹⁶✖					¹⁴✖	¹³✖												¹⁴32		
**American**	Patriot	**4**	-	-	-	-	-																																																																						¹⁵✖	¹⁴✖					¹⁵✖										¹⁶ƒ	
**Norfolk State**	MEAC	**4**	-	-	-	-	-																																																																										¹⁵32								¹⁶✖	¹⁶✖			¹⁶✖	
**North Carolina Central**	MEAC	**4**	-	-	-	-	-																																																																												¹⁴✖			¹⁶ƒ	¹⁶ƒ	¹⁶ƒ						
**Buffalo**	MAC	**4**	-	-	-	-	-																																																																													¹²✖	¹⁴✖		¹³32	⁶32						
**Grand Canyon**	Mountain West	**4**	-	-	-	-	-																																																																																		¹⁵✖		¹⁴✖	¹²32	¹³✖	
Loyola (LA)	NAIA	**3**	-	-	-	-	-																24			23	24																																																																			
**Appalachian State**	Sun Belt	**3**	-	-	-	-	-																																									⁶32																					¹⁴✖																				¹⁶ƒ					
**Mercer**	SoCon	**3**	-	-	-	-	-																																											¹²✖				¹⁵✖																													¹⁴32											
**Northern Illinois**	Horizon	**3**	-	-	-	-	-																																												¹²✖									¹³✖					¹⁴✖																													
**Georgia Southern**	Sun Belt	**3**	-	-	-	-	-																																													¹²ƒ				¹⁵✖					¹⁵✖																																	
**Rider**	Metro	**3**	-	-	-	-	-																																														¹²ƒ									¹⁶✖	¹⁵✖																															
**Fairfield**	Metro	**3**	-	-	-	-	-																																																¹³✖	¹⁶✖										¹⁶✖																												
**Southern Miss**	Sun Belt	**3**	-	-	-	-	-																																																				¹³✖	¹¹✖																					⁹✖													
**Tulane**	American	**3**	-	-	-	-	-																																																						¹⁰32	¹¹32		⁹32																														
**Tennessee State**	Ohio Valley	**3**	-	-	-	-	-																																																							¹⁵✖	¹⁴✖																															¹⁵✖
**Jackson State**	SWAC	**3**	-	-	-	-	-																																																											¹⁶✖			¹⁶✖							¹⁶✖																		
**Prairie View A&M**	SWAC	**3**	-	-	-	-	-																																																												¹⁶✖																					¹⁶ƒ						¹⁶✖
**UIC**	Missouri Valley	**3**	-	-	-	-	-																																																												⁹✖				¹⁵✖		¹³✖																					
**Radford**	Big South	**3**	-	-	-	-	-																																																												¹⁶✖											¹⁶✖									¹⁶✖							
**Samford**	SoCon	**3**	-	-	-	-	-																																																													¹⁴✖	¹³✖																							¹³✖		
**Florida A&M**	SWAC	**3**	-	-	-	-	-																																																													¹⁶✖					¹⁶✖			¹⁶ƒ																		
**Central Connecticut**	NEC	**3**	-	-	-	-	-																																																														¹⁵✖		¹⁴✖					¹⁶✖																		
**Northwestern State**	Southland	**3**	-	-	-	-	-																																																															¹⁶✖					¹⁴32							¹⁴✖												
**Eastern Washington**	Big Sky	**3**	-	-	-	-	-																																																																		¹⁵✖											¹³✖					¹⁴✖					
**Texas A&M–Corpus Christi**	Southland	**3**	-	-	-	-	-																																																																					¹⁵✖														¹⁶ƒ	¹⁶✖			
**UMBC**	America East	**3**	-	-	-	-	-																																																																						¹⁵✖										¹⁶32							¹⁶ƒ
**Northwestern**	Big Ten	**3**	-	-	-	-	-																																																																															⁸32					⁷32	⁹32		
**Northern Kentucky**	Horizon	**3**	-	-	-	-	-																																																																															¹⁵✖		¹⁴✖			¹⁶✖			
Hardin–Simmons	D3	**2**	-	-	-	-	-															22				23																																																																				
**Tennessee Tech**	SoCon	**2**	-	-	-	-	-																				24					25																																																														
**Portland**	West Coast	**2**	-	-	-	-	-																					23																																					¹⁴✖																													
**East Carolina**	American	**2**	-	-	-	-	-																																		25																					¹⁶✖																																
**Marist**	Metro	**2**	-	-	-	-	-																																																¹⁵✖	¹⁴✖																																						
**Towson**	CAA	**2**	-	-	-	-	-																																																				¹⁶✖	¹⁶✖																																		
Saint Francis (PA)	D3	**2**	-	-	-	-	-																																																					¹⁵✖																																	¹⁶ƒ	
**Eastern Illinois**	Ohio Valley	**2**	-	-	-	-	-																																																						¹⁵✖									¹⁵✖																								
**Loyola (MD)**	Patriot	**2**	-	-	-	-	-																																																								¹⁵✖																		¹⁵✖													
**Texas State**	Pac-12	**2**	-	-	-	-	-																																																								¹⁵✖			¹⁶✖																												
**Nicholls**	Southland	**2**	-	-	-	-	-																																																									¹³✖			¹⁶✖																											
**Northern Arizona**	Big Sky	**2**	-	-	-	-	-																																																												¹⁵✖		¹⁵✖																									
**Southeast Missouri State**	Ohio Valley	**2**	-	-	-	-	-																																																														¹³✖																						¹⁶ƒ			
**Cal State Northridge**	Big West	**2**	-	-	-	-	-																																																															¹³✖								¹⁵✖																
**Sam Houston**	CUSA	**2**	-	-	-	-	-																																																																	¹⁵✖							¹⁴✖															
**Wagner**	NEC	**2**	-	-	-	-	-																																																																	¹⁵✖																				¹⁶✖		
**Portland State**	Big Sky	**2**	-	-	-	-	-																																																																						¹⁶✖	¹³✖																
**Stephen F. Austin**	Southland	**2**	-	-	-	-	-																																																																							¹⁴✖					¹²32	~~¹²✖~~	~~¹⁴32~~		~~¹⁴✖~~							
**Morgan State**	MEAC	**2**	-	-	-	-	-																																																																							¹⁵✖	¹⁵✖															
**UC Irvine**	Big West	**2**	-	-	-	-	-																																																																													¹³✖				¹³32						
**Jacksonville State**	CUSA	**2**	-	-	-	-	-																																																																															¹⁵✖				¹⁵✖				
**Lipscomb**	ASUN	**2**	-	-	-	-	-																																																																																¹⁵✖						¹⁴✖	
**Abilene Christian**	UAC	**2**	-	-	-	-	-																																																																																	¹⁵✖	¹⁴32					
**Longwood**	Big South	**2**	-	-	-	-	-																																																																																			¹⁴✖		¹⁶✖		
**Kennesaw State**	CUSA	**2**	-	-	-	-	-																																																																																				¹⁴✖			¹⁴✖
**Bryant**	America East	**2**	-	-	-	-	-																																																																																			¹⁶ƒ			¹⁵✖	
**High Point**	Big South	**2**	-	-	-	-	-																																																																																						¹³✖	¹²32
West Texas A&M	D2	**1**	-	-	-	-	-																	24																																																																						
Williams	D3	**1**	-	-	-	-	-																	24																																																																						
Trinity (TX)	D3	**1**	-	-	-	-	-																															25																																																								
Cal State Los Angeles	D2	**1**	-	-	-	-	-																																				25																																																			
**Houston Christian**	Southland	**1**	-	-	-	-	-																																														¹²ƒ																																									
**Campbell**	CAA	**1**	-	-	-	-	-																																																						¹⁶✖																																	
**FIU**	CUSA	**1**	-	-	-	-	-																																																									¹⁶✖																														
**Western Carolina**	SoCon	**1**	-	-	-	-	-																																																										¹⁶✖																													
**Charleston Southern**	Big South	**1**	-	-	-	-	-																																																											¹⁵✖																												
**Arkansas State**	Sun Belt	**1**	-	-	-	-	-																																																													¹⁵✖																										
**Southern Utah**	Big Sky	**1**	-	-	-	-	-																																																															¹⁴✖																								
**IU Indy**	Horizon	**1**	-	-	-	-	-																																																																	¹⁶✖																						
**Southeastern Louisiana**	Southland	**1**	-	-	-	-	-																																																																			¹⁵✖																				
**Delaware State**	MEAC	**1**	-	-	-	-	-																																																																			¹⁶✖																				
**Alabama A&M**	SWAC	**1**	-	-	-	-	-																																																																			¹⁶ƒ																				
**UT Arlington**	UAC	**1**	-	-	-	-	-																																																																						¹⁶✖																	
**Binghamton**	America East	**1**	-	-	-	-	-																																																																							¹⁵✖																
**Cal Poly**	Big West	**1**	-	-	-	-	-																																																																												¹⁶✖											
**North Florida**	ASUN	**1**	-	-	-	-	-																																																																													¹⁶ƒ										
**Stony Brook**	CAA	**1**	-	-	-	-	-																																																																														¹³✖									
**Cal State Bakersfield**	Big West	**1**	-	-	-	-	-																																																																														¹⁵✖									
**North Dakota**	Summit	**1**	-	-	-	-	-																																																																															¹⁵✖								
**UC Davis**	Mountain West	**1**	-	-	-	-	-																																																																															¹⁶✖								
**Gardner–Webb**	Big South	**1**	-	-	-	-	-																																																																																	¹⁶✖						
Hartford	D3	**1**	-	-	-	-	-																																																																																		¹⁶✖					
**Grambling State**	SWAC	**1**	-	-	-	-	-																																																																																					¹⁶✖		
**Stetson**	ASUN	**1**	-	-	-	-	-																																																																																					¹⁶✖		
**UC San Diego**	Big West	**1**	-	-	-	-	-																																																																																						¹²✖	
**Omaha**	Summit	**1**	-	-	-	-	-																																																																																						¹⁵✖	
**SIU Edwardsville**	Ohio Valley	**1**	-	-	-	-	-																																																																																						¹⁶✖	
**California Baptist**	Big West	**1**	-	-	-	-	-																																																																																							¹³✖
**Queens**	ASUN	**1**	-	-	-	-	-																																																																																							¹⁵✖
**Arkansas–Pine Bluff**	SWAC	-	-	-	-	-	-																																																																								~~¹⁶✖~~															
**Northern Colorado**	Big Sky	-	-	-	-	-	-																																																																									~~¹⁵✖~~														

=== Streaks ===
Bold indicates an active current streak as of the 2026 tournament.

School	Start of streak	Last appearance in streak	Years
**Kansas**	1990	2026	36 years (Note: Kansas's 2018 appearance was vacated.)
**Michigan State**	1998	2026	28 years
North Carolina	1975	2001	27 years
**Gonzaga**	1999	2026	27 years
Duke	1996	2019	24 years

== Rituals and influence ==
=== National anthem ===
During the Final Four game, the national anthem was sung by four student-athletes from the four semi-finalist schools with one student-athlete representing each school.

=== Cutting down the nets ===
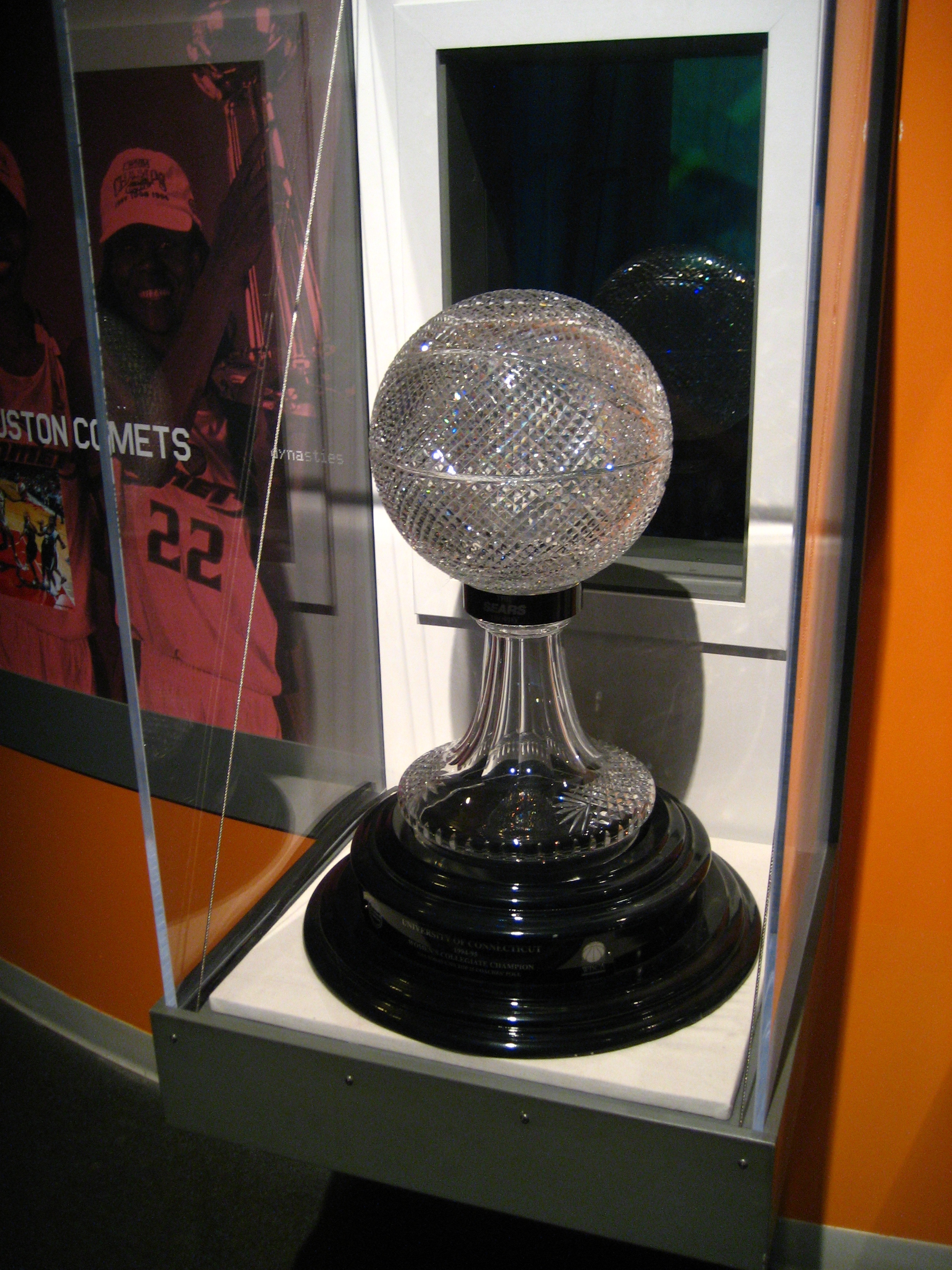
The NABC championship trophy

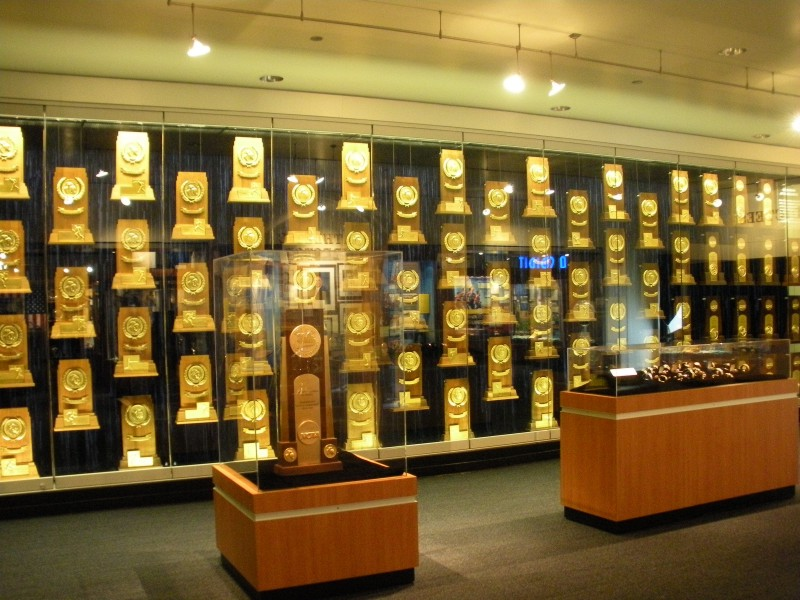
NCAA-style trophies for various sports, as seen at UCLA

As a tournament ritual, the winning team cuts down the nets at the end of regional championship games as well as the national championship game. Starting with the seniors, and moving down by classes, players each cut a single strand off each net; the head coach cuts the last strand connecting the net to the hoop, claiming the net itself. An exception to the head coach cutting the last strand came in 2013, when Louisville head coach Rick Pitino gave that honor to Kevin Ware, who had suffered a catastrophic leg injury during the tournament. This tradition is credited to Everett Case, the coach of North Carolina State, who stood on his players' shoulders to accomplish the feat after the Wolfpack won the Southern Conference tournament in 1947. CBS, since 1987 and yearly to 2015, in the odd-numbered years since 2017, and TBS, since 2016, the even-numbered years, close out the tournament with "One Shining Moment", performed by Luther Vandross.

=== Team awards ===
Just as the Olympics awards gold, silver, and bronze medals for first, second, and third place, respectively, the NCAA awards the national champions a gold-plated wooden NCAA national championship trophy. The loser of the championship game receives a silver-plated national runner-up trophy for second place. Since 2006, all four Final Four teams receive a bronze plated NCAA regional championship trophy; prior to 2006, only the teams who did not make the title game received bronze plated trophies for being a semifinalist.

The champions also receive a commemorative gold championship ring, and the other three Final Four teams receive Final Four rings.

The National Association of Basketball Coaches also presents a more elaborate marble/crystal trophy to the winning team. Ostensibly, this award is given for taking the top position in the NABC's end-of-season poll, but this is invariably the same as the NCAA championship game winner. In 2005, Siemens acquired naming rights to the NABC trophy, which is now called the Siemens Trophy. Formerly, the NABC trophy was presented right after the standard NCAA championship trophy, but this caused some confusion. Since 2006, the Siemens/NABC trophy has been presented separately at a press conference the day after the game.

=== Most Outstanding Player ===
After the championship trophy is awarded, one player is selected and then awarded the Most Outstanding Player award (which almost always comes from the championship team). It is not intended to be the same as a Most Valuable Player award although it is sometimes informally referred to as such. Most recently, Elliot Cadeau, playing for Michigan, won this title in 2026. With it being one of the most famous tournaments to watch, everyone is able to have their opinion on who they think is the most outstanding. The NBA puts together a bunch of statistics in an effort to measure both the productivity of the team and the individual players. Both the regular season and post-season are taken into account. With the difference in games each team plays in the postseason, per-game averages will be used rather than just combining all season totals.

=== Influence on the NBA draft ===
Because the NBA draft takes place just three months after the NCAA tournament, NBA executives have to decide how players' performances in a maximum of seven games, from the First Four to the championship game, should affect their draft decisions. A 2012 study for the National Bureau of Economic Research explores how the March tournament affects the way that professional teams behave in the June draft. The study is based on data from 1997 to 2010 that looks at how college tournament standouts performed at the NBA level.

The researchers determined that a player who outperforms his regular season averages or who is on a team that wins more games than its seed would indicate will be drafted higher than he otherwise would have been. At the same time, the study indicated that professional teams do not take college tournament performance into consideration as much as they should, as success in the tournament correlates with elite professional accomplishment, particularly top-level success. "If anything, NBA teams undervalue the signal provided by unexpected performance in the NCAA March Madness tournament as a predictor of future NBA success."

== Television coverage and revenues ==
=== Television contracts ===
Since 2011, the NCAA has had a joint contract with CBS and Warner Bros. Discovery. The coverage of the tournament is split between CBS, TNT, TBS, and truTV with streaming components Paramount+ (only CBS games) and HBO Max (only TBS, TNT, and truTV games).

Broadcasters from CBS, TBS, and TNT's sports coverage are shared across all four networks, with CBS's college basketball teams supplemented with TNT's NBA teams, while studio segments take place at the CBS Broadcast Center in New York City and TNT's studios in Atlanta. In the New York–based studio shows, CBS's Adam Zucker and Clark Kellogg are joined by Ernie Johnson, Kenny Smith, and Charles Barkley of TNT's Inside the NBA while Seth Davis and Jay Wright of CBS assist with Adam Lefkoe and Candace Parker of TNT's Tuesday night NBA coverage. While three of TNT's NBA voices, Kevin Harlan, Ian Eagle, and Spero Dedes are already employed by CBS in other capacities, TNT also lends analysts Stan Van Gundy, Jim Jackson, Grant Hill, and Steve Smith, secondary play-by-play man Brian Anderson, and reporters Allie LaForce and Lauren Shehadi, the latter being from TBS's MLB coverage, to CBS. In turn, CBS announcers Brad Nessler, Andrew Catalon, and Tom McCarthy appear on WBD network broadcasts along with analysts Jim Spanarkel, Bill Raftery, Dan Bonner, Steve Lappas, Brendan Haywood, and Avery Johnson, as well as reporters Tracy Wolfson, Evan Washburn, A. J. Ross, and Jon Rothstein, and rules analyst Gene Steratore. Announcers from other networks like Lisa Byington and Robbie Hummel from Fox, the latter also working for Peacock and Big Ten Network, Debbie Antonelli from ESPN, Jamie Erdahl from NFL Network, and Andy Katz from NCAA.com are also lent to CBS and TNT.

The most recent transaction in 2016 renews the contract through 2032 and provides for the nationwide broadcast each year of all games of the tournament. All First Four games air on truTV. A featured first- or second-round game in each time "window" is broadcast on CBS, while all other games are shown either on TBS, TNT or truTV. The regional semifinals, better known as the Sweet Sixteen, are split between CBS and TBS. CBS had the exclusive rights to the regional finals, also known as the Elite Eight, through 2013. That exclusivity extended to the entire Final Four as well, but after the 2013 tournament Turner Sports (now TNT Sports) elected to exercise a contractual option for 2014 and 2015 giving TBS broadcast rights to the national semifinal matchups. CBS kept its national championship game rights.

Since 2014, CBS and TBS split coverage of the Elite Eight. Since 2016 CBS and TBS alternate coverage of the Final Four and national championship game, with TBS getting the final two rounds in even-numbered years, and CBS getting the games in odd-numbered years. March Madness On Demand would remain unchanged, although Turner was allowed to develop their own service.

The CBS/Turner broadcasts provide the NCAA with over $500 million annually, and makes up over 90% of the NCAA's annual revenue. The revenues from the multibillion-dollar television contract are divided among the Division I basketball playing schools and conferences as follows:

- One-sixth of the money goes directly to the schools based on how many sports they play (one "share" for each sport starting with 14, which is the minimum needed for Division I membership).
- One-third of the money goes directly to the schools based on how many scholarships they give out (one share for each of the first 50, two for each of the next 50, ten for each of the next 50, and 20 for each scholarship above 150).
- Half of the money goes to the conferences based on how well they did in the six previous men's basketball tournaments (counting each year separately, one share for each team getting in, and one share for each win. Prior to 2026, the Final Four and National Championship games, and prior to 2008, the play-in game, did not award units. In 2007, based on the 2001 through 2006 tournaments, the Big East received over $14.85 million, while the eight conferences that did not win a first-round game in those six years received slightly more than $1 million each. Most conferences distribute most of the revenue evenly to its member institutions, regardless of performance. By 2021, the value of the shares or "units" to a conference was worth US$337,141.

=== History of television coverage ===
CBS has been the major partner of the NCAA in televising the tournament since 1982, but there have been many changes in coverage since the tournament was first broadcast in 1969.

==== Early broadcast coverage ====
From 1969 to 1981, the NCAA tournament aired on NBC, but not all games were televised. The early rounds, in particular, were not always seen on TV.

In 1982, CBS obtained broadcast television rights to the NCAA tournament.

==== ESPN & CBS share coverage ====
In 1980, ESPN began showing the opening rounds of the tournament. This was the network's first contract signed with the NCAA for a major sport, and helped to establish ESPN's following among college basketball fans. ESPN showed six first-round games on Thursday and again on Friday, with CBS, from 1982 to 1990, then picking up a seventh game at 11:30 p.m. ET. Thus, 14 of 32 first-round games were televised. ESPN also re-ran games overnight. At the time, there was only one ESPN network, with no ability to split its signal regionally, so ESPN showed only the most competitive games. During the 1980s, the tournament's popularity on television soared.

==== CBS takes over ====
However, ESPN became a victim of its own success, as CBS was awarded the rights to cover all games of the NCAA tournament, starting in 1991. Only with the introduction of the so-called "play-in" game (between the 64 seed and the 65 seed) in the 2000s, did ESPN get back in the game starting in 2002 (and actually, the first time this "play-in" game was played in 2001, the game was aired on The National Network, using CBS graphics and announcers, as both CBS and TNN were both owned by Viacom at the time).

Through 2010, CBS broadcast the remaining 63 games of the NCAA tournament proper. Most areas saw only eight of 32 first-round games, seven of 16 second-round games, and four of eight regional semifinal games (out of the possible 56 games during these rounds; there would be some exceptions to this rule in the 2000s). Coverage preempted regular programming on the network, except during a two-hour window from about 5 p.m. ET until 7 p.m. ET when the local affiliates could show programming. The CBS format resulted in far fewer hours of first-round coverage than under the old ESPN format but allowed the games to reach a much larger audience than ESPN was able to reach.

During this period of near-exclusivity by CBS, the network provided to its local affiliates three types of feeds from each venue: constant feed, swing feed, and flex feed. Constant feeds remained primarily on a given game, and were used primarily by stations with a clear local interest in a particular game. Despite its name, a constant feed occasionally veered away to other games for brief updates (as is typical in most American sports coverage), but coverage generally remained with the initial game. A swing feed tended to stay on games believed to be of natural interest to the locality, such as teams from local conferences, but may leave that game to go to other games that during their progress become close matches. On a flex feed, coverage bounced around from one venue to another, depending on action at the various games in progress. If one game was a blowout, coverage could switch to a more competitive game. A flex feed was provided when there were no games with a significant natural local interest for the stations carrying them, which allowed the flex game to be the best game in progress. Station feeds were planned in advance and stations had the option of requesting either constant or flex feed for various games.

==== Viewing options emerge ====
In 1999, DirecTV began broadcasting all games otherwise not shown on local television with its Mega March Madness premium package. The DirecTV system used the subscriber's ZIP code to black out games which could be seen on broadcast television. Prior to that, all games were available on C-Band satellite and were picked up by sports bars.

In 2003, CBS struck a deal with Yahoo! to offer live streaming of the first three rounds of games under its Yahoo! Platinum service, for $16.95 a month. In 2004, CBS began selling viewers access to March Madness On Demand, which provided games not otherwise shown on broadcast television; the service was free for AOL subscribers. In 2006, March Madness On Demand was made free, and continued to be so to online users through the 2011 tournament. For 2012, it once again became a pay service, with a single payment of $3.99 providing access to all 67 tournament games. In 2013, the service, now renamed March Madness Live, was again made free, but uses Turner's rights and infrastructure for TV Everywhere, which requires sign-in though the password of a customer's cable or satellite provider to watch games, both via PC/Mac and mobile devices. Those that do not have a cable or satellite service or one not participating in Turner's TV Everywhere are restricted to games carried on the CBS national feed and three hours (originally four) of other games without sign-in, or coverage via Westwood One's radio coverage. Effective with the 2018 tournament, the national semifinals and final are under TV Everywhere restrictions if they are aired by Turner networks; before then, those particular games were not subject to said restrictions.

In addition, CBS Sports Network (formerly CBS College Sports Network) had broadcast two "late early" games that would not otherwise be broadcast nationally. These were the second games in the daytime session in the Pacific Time Zone, to avoid starting games before 10 AM. These games are also available via March Madness Live and on CBS affiliates in the market areas of the team playing. In other markets, newscasts, local programming or preempted CBS morning programming are aired. CBSSN is scheduled to continue broadcasting the official pregame and postgame shows and press conferences from the teams involved, along with overnight replays.

==== HDTV coverage ====
The Final Four has been broadcast in HDTV since 1999. From 2000 to 2004, only one first-/second-round site and one regional site were designated as HDTV sites. In 2005, all regional games were broadcast in HDTV, and four first- and second-round sites were designated for HDTV coverage. Local stations broadcasting in both digital and analog had the option of airing separate games on their HD and SD channels, to take advantage of the available high definition coverage. Beginning in 2007, all games in the tournament (including all first- and second-round games) were available in high definition, and local stations were required to air the same game on both their analog and digital channels. However, due to satellite limitations, first-round "constant" feeds were only available in standard definition. Moreover, some digital television stations, such as WRAL-TV in Raleigh, North Carolina, choose not to participate in HDTV broadcasts of the first and second rounds and the regional semifinals, and used their available bandwidth to split their signal into digital subchannels to show all games going on simultaneously. By 2008, upgrades at the CBS broadcast center allowed all feeds, flex and constant, to be in HD for the tournament.

=== International broadcasts ===
As of 2011, ESPN International holds international broadcast rights to the tournament, distributing coverage to its co-owned networks and other broadcasters. ESPN produces the world feed for broadcasts of the Final Four and championship game, produced using ESPN College Basketball staff and commentators.

== Records ==
=== NCAA tournament win totals ===
The top ten programs in total NCAA victories:

Rank	School	#
1	North Carolina	134
2	Kentucky	133*
3	Duke	129
4	Kansas	114*
5	UCLA	112*
6	Michigan State	78
7	UConn	75
8	Indiana	68
9	Michigan	67*
9	Villanova	67*

*Vacated victories not included

=== Most Final Four and championship appearances ===
Programs with ten or more appearances in the Final Four:

School	National semifinal appearances	National championship game appearances	National championships
North Carolina	21	12	6
UCLA	18*	12*	11
Duke	18	11	5
Kentucky	17	12	8
Kansas	15*	10	4
Ohio State	10*	5	1
Michigan State	10	3	2

*Vacated appearances not included

=== No. 1 seeds ===
Since 1979, the NCAA has seeded each region. Beginning in 2004, the Selection Committee announced the rankings among the 1 seeds, designating an overall #1 seed and pairing the regions so that the overall #1 seed would meet the #4 overall seed in the Final Four if both advanced. The overall rankings are denoted with the numbers in parentheses. The following teams received the top ranking in each region:

Year	East	Midwest (Note: The Midwest region was designated the Southwest region in 2011.)	South (Note: The South region was designated the Mideast region from 1979–1984 and the Southeast region from 1985–1999 and in 2011.)	West
1979	North Carolina	Indiana State	Notre Dame	UCLA
1980	Syracuse	LSU	Kentucky	DePaul
1981	Virginia	LSU	DePaul	Oregon State*
1982	**North Carolina**	DePaul	Virginia	Georgetown
1983	St. John's	Houston	Louisville	Virginia
1984	North Carolina	DePaul	Kentucky	**Georgetown**
1985	Georgetown	Oklahoma	Michigan	St. John's
1986	Duke	Kansas	Kentucky	St. John's
1987	North Carolina	**Indiana**	Georgetown	UNLV
1988	Temple	Purdue	Oklahoma	Arizona
1989	Georgetown	Illinois	Oklahoma	Arizona
1990	Connecticut	Oklahoma	Michigan State	**UNLV**
1991	North Carolina	Ohio State	Arkansas	UNLV
1992	**Duke**	Kansas	Ohio State	UCLA
1993	**North Carolina**	Indiana	Kentucky	Michigan*
1994	North Carolina	**Arkansas**	Purdue	Missouri
1995	Wake Forest	Kansas	Kentucky	**UCLA**
1996	Massachusetts*	**Kentucky**	Connecticut	Purdue
1997	North Carolina	Minnesota*	Kansas	Kentucky
1998	North Carolina	Kansas	Duke	Arizona
1999	Duke	Michigan State	Auburn	**Connecticut**
2000	Duke	**Michigan State**	Stanford	Arizona
2001	**Duke**	Illinois	Michigan State	Stanford
2002	**Maryland**	Kansas	Duke	Cincinnati
2003	Oklahoma	Kentucky	Texas	Arizona
2004 (Note: Regions were named after host cities: East Rutherford Regional (East), St. Louis Regional (Midwest), Atlanta Regional (South), and Phoenix Regional (West).)	(4) St. Joseph's	(1) Kentucky	(2) Duke	(3) Stanford
2005 (Note: Regions were named after host cities: Syracuse Regional (East), Chicago Regional (Midwest), Austin Regional (South), and Albuquerque Regional (West).)	(2) **North Carolina**	(1) Illinois	(3) Duke	(4) Washington
2006 (Note: Regions were named after host cities: Washington, D.C., Regional (East); Minneapolis Regional (Midwest); Atlanta Regional (South); and Oakland Regional (West).)	(2) Connecticut	(3) Villanova	(1) Duke	(4) Memphis
2007	(2) North Carolina	(1) **Florida**	(3) Ohio State	(4) Kansas
2008	(1) North Carolina	(4) **Kansas**	(2) Memphis*	(3) UCLA
2009	(2) Pittsburgh	(1) Louisville	(3) **North Carolina**	(4) Connecticut
2010	(2) Kentucky	(1) Kansas	(3) **Duke**	(4) Syracuse
2011	(1) Ohio State	(2) Kansas	(3) Pittsburgh	(4) Duke
2012	(2) Syracuse	(3) North Carolina	(1) **Kentucky**	(4) Michigan State
2013	(3) Indiana	(1) **Louisville***	(2) Kansas	(4) Gonzaga
2014	(4) Virginia	(3) Wichita State	(1) Florida	(2) Arizona
2015	(2) Villanova	(1) Kentucky	(3) **Duke**	(4) Wisconsin
2016	(2) North Carolina	(3) Virginia	(1) Kansas	(4) Oregon
2017	(1) Villanova	(2) Kansas	(3) **North Carolina**	(4) Gonzaga
2018	(2) **Villanova**	(3) Kansas*	(1) Virginia	(4) Xavier
2019	(1) Duke	(3) North Carolina	(2) **Virginia**	(4) Gonzaga
2020	**Tournament canceled** due to the COVID-19 outbreak			
2021 (Note: All games were played in Indiana as a COVID-19 precaution.)	(4) Michigan	(3) Illinois	(2) **Baylor**	(1) Gonzaga
2022	(4) Baylor	(3) **Kansas**	(2) Arizona	(1) Gonzaga
2023	(4) Purdue	(2) Houston	(1) Alabama	(3) Kansas
2024	(1) **Connecticut**	(3) Purdue	(2) Houston	(4) North Carolina
2025	(2) Duke	(3) Houston	(1) Auburn	(4) **Florida**
2026	(1) Duke	(3) **Michigan**	(4) Florida	(2) Arizona

*Vacated
Bold denotes team also won tournament

==== No. 1 seeds by school ====
#1 seeds	Schools
18	North Carolina
16	Duke
15	Kansas*
12	Kentucky
8	Arizona
7	Virginia
6	UConn
5	Georgetown, Gonzaga, Michigan State, Oklahoma, Purdue
4	DePaul, Florida, Houston, Illinois, Ohio State, UCLA, Villanova
3	Indiana, Michigan*, St. John's, Stanford, Syracuse, UNLV
2	Arkansas, Auburn, Baylor, Louisville*, LSU, Pittsburgh
1	Alabama, Cincinnati, Indiana State, Maryland, Memphis*, Missouri, Notre Dame, Oregon, St. Joseph's, Temple, Texas, Wake Forest, Washington, Wichita State, Wisconsin, Xavier

Last updated through 2026 tournament.
*Vacated appearances not included (see #1 seeds by year and region)

==== All No. 1 seeds in the Final Four ====
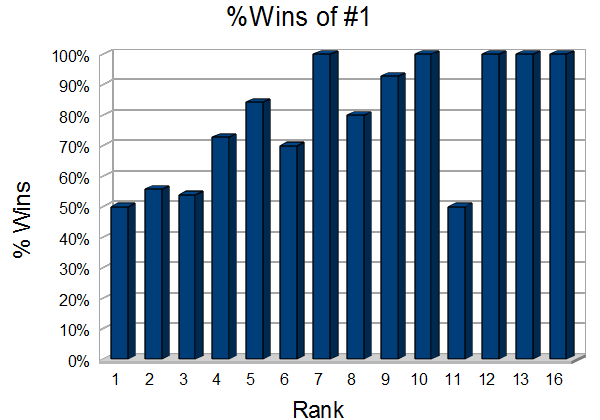
Rank#1 vs. other ranks (prior to 2018)

On two occasions have all four No. 1 seeds make it to the Final Four:

- 2008 – Kansas (champion), North Carolina, UCLA, Memphis
- 2025 – Florida (champion), Auburn, Duke, Houston

==== Final Fours without a No. 1 seed ====
Four times (including three since the field expanded to 64 teams) the Final Four has been without a No. 1 seed:

- 1980 – No. 2 Louisville (champion), No. 8 UCLA (runner-up), No. 5 Iowa, No. 6 Purdue
- 2006 – No. 3 Florida (champion), No. 2 UCLA (runner-up), No. 4 LSU, No. 11 George Mason
- 2011 – No. 3 Connecticut (champion), No. 8 Butler (runner-up), No. 4 Kentucky, No. 11 VCU
- 2023 – No. 4 UConn (champion), No. 5 San Diego State (runner-up), No. 5 Miami (FL), No. 9 Florida Atlantic

Since 1985, there have been 4 instances of three No. 1 seeds reaching the Final Four; 13 instances of two No. 1 seeds making it; and 14 instances of just one No. 1 seed reaching the Final Four. 2023 was the first Final Four without a 1, 2, or 3 seed.

==== No. 1 seeds in the championship game ====
There have been 11 occasions (ten times since the field expanded to 64) that the championship game has been played between two No. 1 seeds:

- 1982 – North Carolina beat Georgetown
- 1993 – North Carolina beat Michigan
- 1999 – Connecticut beat Duke
- 2005 – North Carolina beat Illinois
- 2007 – Florida beat Ohio State
- 2008 – Kansas beat Memphis
- 2015 – Duke beat Wisconsin
- 2017 – North Carolina beat Gonzaga
- 2021 – Baylor beat Gonzaga
- 2024 – UConn beat Purdue
- 2025 – Florida beat Houston

Since 1985 there have been 18 instances of one No. 1 seed reaching the championship game (No. 1 seeds are 13–5 against other seeds in the title game) and 8 instances where no No. 1 seed made it to the title game.

==== Additional No. 1 seed stats ====
- In 1997, Arizona became the only team to beat three No. 1 seeds in a single tournament. Arizona (No. 4 seed) beat Kansas in its own southeast region, then beat North Carolina in the Final Four and finally Kentucky in the championship game. The most No. 1 seeds any team can face in the tournament is three (provided that the team itself is not a No. 1 seed, in which case it can only face two No. 1 seeds in the tournament).
- In 2011, the highest seed to advance to the Final Four was No. 3 seed Connecticut, making the 2011 tournament the first time that neither a No. 1 seed nor a No. 2 seed advanced into the final weekend of play. In the same tournament, Butler made history as the first program to make consecutive Final Fours while not being seeded No. 1 or No. 2 in either season.
- There have been 16 teams that have entered the tournament unbeaten. Four of those teams were from UCLA, and all those Bruin teams won each of those tournaments. However, of the other 12 teams entering the tournament unbeaten, just three went on to win the tournament. For details, see table below.
- In 1980, 1981, and 1982, when the tournament was 48 teams, DePaul was seeded No. 1 but was defeated in the first round.
- Theoretically, a No. 1 seed's most difficult six-game path to win the tournament is to defeat a No. 16, a No. 8, a No. 4, a No. 2, a No. 1, and a No. 1—the highest possible opposing seeds in successive rounds. No No. 1 seed has ever won all six such games, though two teams have won the first five.
  - In the 2002 tournament, Maryland reached the final after defeating teams seeded 16/8/4/2/1; they won the tournament after defeating No. 5 Indiana in the final.
  - In the 2015 tournament, Wisconsin reached the final after defeating teams seeded 16/8/4/2/1. In the final, they faced No. 1 Duke with a chance to complete the full six-game path. However, Wisconsin lost the final.
- In 2023, no No. 1 seeds advanced to the Elite Eight for the first time ever. Purdue lost to Fairleigh Dickinson in the first round; Kansas lost to Arkansas in the second round, and both Alabama and Houston lost in the Sweet Sixteen, respectively, to San Diego State and Miami.

==== Teams No. 1 in national polls ====
Teams that entered the tournament ranked No. 1 in at least one of the AP, UPI, or USA Today polls and won the tournament:

- 1949: Kentucky (AP)
- 1951: Kentucky (AP/UPI)
- 1953: Indiana (AP/UPI)
- 1955: San Francisco (AP/UPI)
- 1956: San Francisco (AP/UPI)
- 1957: North Carolina (AP/UPI)
- 1964: UCLA (AP/UPI)
- 1967: UCLA (AP/UPI)
- 1969: UCLA (AP/UPI)
- 1971: UCLA (AP/UPI)
- 1972: UCLA (AP/UPI)
- 1973: UCLA (AP/UPI)
- 1974: NC State (AP/UPI)
- 1976: Indiana (AP/UPI)
- 1978: Kentucky (AP/UPI)
- 1982: North Carolina (AP/UPI)
- 1992: Duke (AP/UPI)
- 1994: Arkansas (USA Today)
- 1995: UCLA (AP/USA Today)
- 2001: Duke (AP/USA Today)
- 2012: Kentucky (AP/USA Today)
- 2024: UConn (AP/USA Today)

=== Undefeated teams in the tournament ===
The record here refers to the record before the first game of the NCAA tournament.

Year	Team	Record	Result
1951	Columbia	21–0	Lost Sweet 16 game to Illinois
1956	San Francisco	24–0	**Won** the tournament, beat Iowa
1957	North Carolina	27–0	**Won** the tournament, beat Kansas
1961	Ohio State	24–0	Lost in championship game to Cincinnati
1964	UCLA	26–0	**Won** the tournament, beat Duke
1967	UCLA	26–0	**Won** the tournament, beat Dayton
1968	Houston	28–0	Lost in national semifinal game to UCLA
1968	St. Bonaventure	22–0	Lost Sweet 16 game to North Carolina
1971	Pennsylvania	26–0	Lost Elite 8 game to Villanova
1971	Marquette	26–0	Lost Sweet 16 game to Ohio State
1972	UCLA	26–0	**Won** the tournament, beat Florida State
1973	UCLA	26–0	**Won** the tournament, beat Memphis State
1975	Indiana	29–0	Lost Elite 8 game to Kentucky
1976	Indiana	27–0	**Won** the tournament, beat Michigan
1976	Rutgers	27–0	Lost in national semifinal game to Michigan
1979	Indiana State	28–0	Lost in championship game to Michigan State
1991	UNLV	30–0	Lost in national semifinal game to Duke
2014	Wichita State	34–0	Lost in Round of 32 to Kentucky
2015	Kentucky	34–0	Lost in national semifinal game to Wisconsin
2021	Gonzaga	26–0	Lost in championship game to Baylor

==== Undefeated teams not in the tournament ====
The NCAA tournament has dramatically expanded since 1975, and since the expansion to 48 teams in 1980, no unbeaten team has failed to qualify. Since by definition, a team would have to win its conference tournament, and thus secure an automatic bid to the tournament, to be undefeated in a season, the only way a team could finish undefeated and not reach the tournament is if the team is banned from postseason play. As of 2021, no team banned from postseason play has finished undefeated since 1980. Other possibilities for an undefeated team to fail to qualify: the team is independent; the conference does not have an automatic bid; or the team is transitioning from a lower NCAA division or the NAIA, during which time it is barred from NCAA-sponsored postseason play in the NCAA tournament or NIT. No men's team from a transitional D-I member has been unbeaten after its conference tournament, but one such women's team has been—California Baptist in 2021 (CBU was able to play in the women's NIT, which has never been operated by the NCAA).

Before 1980, there were occasions on which a team achieved perfection in the regular season, yet did not appear in the NCAA tournament.

- During 1939, Long Island University finished the regular season 20–0 but decided to accept instead an invitation to the second NIT (which they won) instead of the first and only NABC tournament (later called the NCAA tournament), as the NIT was more prestigious at the time. It was not until the mid-1950s that the NCAA required that its tournament would have "first choice" in determining teams for their field. Before then, many of the more successful teams during the regular season chose to play in the NIT instead of the NCAA tournament.
- During 1940, Seton Hall finished the regular season 19–0, but their record had been built largely against weak teams and thus did not earn them an invitation to the postseason tournament.
- During 1941, Milwaukee State finished the regular season 16–0, but their record had been built largely against weak teams and thus did not earn them an invitation to the postseason tournament.
- During 1944, Army finished the regular season 15–0 but owing to World War II, the Cadets did not accept an invitation to postseason play.
- During 1954, Kentucky finished 25–0 and were invited to the tournament, but declined the invitation, due their star players being ineligible due to already graduating.
- During 1973, NC State finished the regular season 27–0 and ranked #2 (behind undefeated and eventual tournament champion UCLA) but were barred from participating in the NCAA tournament while on probation for recruiting violations.
- During 1979, Alcorn State finished the regular season 27–0, but did not receive an invitation to the NCAA tournament. The Braves accepted a bid to the NIT, where they lost in the second round to eventual NIT champion Indiana.

=== Repeat champions ===
Eight programs have repeated as national championships. UCLA is the only program to win more than 2 in a row, winning 7 straight from 1967 to 1973. These programs are:

- Oklahoma State: 1945 and 1946
- Kentucky: 1948 and 1949
- San Francisco: 1955 and 1956
- Cincinnati: 1961 and 1962
- UCLA: 1964 and 1965; 1967, 1968, 1969, 1970, 1971, 1972, and 1973
- Duke: 1991 and 1992
- Florida: 2006 and 2007
- UConn: 2023 and 2024

There have been nine times in which the tournament did not include the reigning champion (the previous year's winner):

- 1978 champion Kentucky went 19–12 in 1979. They accepted an invitation to the National Invitation Tournament, losing to Clemson in the first round.
- Both 1979 champion Michigan State (12–15) and 1979 runner up Indiana State (16–11) failed to qualify for the 1980 NCAA tournament. Furthermore, neither was invited to the National Invitation Tournament, and Michigan State is the only team to finish the subsequent season with a losing record. Following the 1979 NCAA tournament, Indiana State lost Larry Bird to graduation, and Magic Johnson left Michigan State after his sophomore season to enter the NBA draft.
- 1983 champion North Carolina State went 19–14 in 1984. They accepted an invitation to the National Invitation Tournament, losing to Florida State in the first round.
- 1986 champion Louisville went 18–14 in 1987. They declined an invitation to the National Invitation Tournament.
- 1988 champion Kansas went 19–12 in 1989. The team was ineligible for postseason participation in 1989 due to NCAA sanctions for recruiting violations.
- Both 2007 champion Florida (24–12) and 2007 runner-up Ohio State (24–13) failed to qualify for the 2008 NCAA tournament. Both accepted invitations to the National Invitation Tournament. Florida lost to Massachusetts in the semifinals, and Ohio State subsequently beat Massachusetts in the championship game to win the tournament.
- 2009 champion North Carolina went 20–17 in 2010. They accepted an invitation to the National Invitation Tournament and reached the finals, losing to Dayton.
- 2012 champion Kentucky went 21–12 in 2013. They accepted an invitation to the National Invitation Tournament, losing to Robert Morris in the first round.
- 2014 champion UConn went 20–15 in 2015. They accepted an invitation to the National Invitation Tournament, losing to Arizona State in the first round.

=== Upsets by low-seeded teams ===
==== Best performances by No. 16 seeds ====
In 2018, UMBC became the first No. 16 seed to defeat a No. 1 seed in the tournament, shocking Virginia 74–54. In 2023, Fairleigh Dickinson repeated the feat in a 63–58 win over Purdue.

Five other No. 16 seeds have lost to No. 1 seeds by four or fewer points:

- East Tennessee State lost 72–71 to Oklahoma in 1989
- Princeton lost 50–49 to Georgetown in 1989
- Western Carolina lost 73–71 to Purdue in 1996
- Fairleigh Dickinson lost 59–55 to Michigan in 1985
- While Murray State lost 75–71 to Michigan State in 1990, it is the only No. 16 seed to have taken a game into overtime.
- Siena was the first 16 seed to have a double-digit halftime lead on a number 1 seed (Duke at the 2026 tournament).

=== Mid-major teams ===
Mid-major teams, which are generally defined as Division I teams that do not play in the American Conference, Atlantic Coast Conference (ACC), Big 12, Big East, Big Ten or Southeastern Conference (SEC), are generally underdogs compared to schools in the aforementioned conferences and are often defeated by power schools early in the tournament. However, some mid-major programs experience consistent success despite being at a disadvantage. 1990 champions UNLV are one such example; then a member of the Big West, they had reached the Sweet Sixteen in four of the last six tournaments prior to their championship. Gonzaga are another example of this, having twice been the tournament runner-up and routinely contending for top-rated prospects.

Every Final Four in tournament history has included at least one power school. The 1979 was the most recent edition to have three mid-major programs reach the Final Four: Indiana State of the Missouri Valley Conference, Penn of the Ivy League, and independent DePaul. The 2023 had two mid-majors reach the Final Four, those being Florida Atlantic of Conference USA and San Diego State of the Mountain West Conference. Arguably the edition with the most mid-major success was the 1970 tournament, which had ten mid-majors in the Sweet 16 and six in the Elite Eight. The final four consisted of eventual champions UCLA of the Pacific-8 and independents Jacksonville, New Mexico State and St. Bonaventure.

This table shows the performance of mid-major teams from the Sweet Sixteen round to the national championship game from 1939—the tournament's first year—to the most recent tournament.

Notes

- The first column is a list of every mid-major conference. For the conferences that have predecessor names, a footnote (below the table) lists those names and years. Opposite each conference's name are the schools that have appeared in the tournament from the Sweet Sixteen onwards when the school was a member of the conference or a predecessor conference.
- Some of the conferences that are considered mid-majors were regarded as major conferences in the past. For example:
  - The Missouri Valley Conference was considered a major basketball conference until many of its most prominent members left in the mid-1970s (before Indiana State's 1979 run to the title game).
  - Conference USA was considered a major conference at its formation in 1995. It arguably became a mid-major in 2005, when several of its more prominent teams left for the Big East Conference, and unquestionably became a mid-major during the early-2010s realignment cycle.
  - The WAC was considered a major conference until 1999, when 8 of its 16 members left to form the Mountain West Conference.
  - The MW was considered a major basketball conference until 2011, when two of its most prominent basketball programs (BYU and Utah) left for other conferences (West Coast Conference and Pac-12, respectively).
- Certain programs that were members of "mid-major" conferences during deep tournament runs are nonetheless widely viewed as having been major programs at that time. The same applies to many programs that were independent before the 1980s. Examples include (but are not limited to) San Francisco in the 1950s, Marquette in the 1970s, UNLV in the last part of the 20th century, and Gonzaga since no later than the mid-2010s.

Mid-major conference	Sweet Sixteen	Elite Eight	Final Four	Championship game	National champion
America East (Note: Known as the Eastern College Athletic Conference-North from 1979 to 1988 and the North Atlantic Conference from 1988 to 1996.)	–	–	–	–	–
ASUN (Note: Known as the Trans America Athletic Conference (TAAC) from 1978 to 2001, the Atlantic Sun Conference from 2001 to 2016, and the ASUN Conference from 2016 to 2023. It still uses "ASUN" as its official abbreviation.)	Florida Gulf Coast (2013)	–	–	–	–
Atlantic 10	Rutgers (1979), Rhode Island (1988), George Washington (1993), St. Joseph's (1997), Xavier (2009, 2010, 2012), Richmond (2011), La Salle (2013)	Temple (1988, 1991, 1993, 1999, 2001), Massachusetts (1995), Rhode Island (1998), St. Joseph's (2004), Xavier (2004, 2008), Dayton (2014)	-	-	
Big Sky	Weber State (1969, 1972), Montana (1975), Idaho (1982)	Idaho State (1977)	–	–	–
Big South	–	–	–	–	–
Big West (Note: Known as the Pacific Coast Athletic Association (PCAA) from 1969 to 1988.)	Long Beach State (1973), UNLV (1975, 1976, 1984, 1986), Fresno State (1982), New Mexico State (1992)	Long Beach State (1972), Cal State Fullerton (1978), UNLV (1989)	UNLV (1977, 1987, 1991)	–	UNLV (1990)
CAA (Note: Known as the Eastern College Athletic Conference-South from 1979 to 1985. The "C", currently standing for "Coastal", stood for "Colonial" from 1985–2023.)	Richmond (1988)	Navy (1986)	George Mason (2006), VCU (2011)	–	
CUSA	Louisville (1996), Cincinnati (2001), UAB (2004), Memphis (2009)	Cincinnati (1996), Louisville (1997), Memphis (2006, 2007)	Marquette (2003), Louisville (2005), Florida Atlantic (2023)	Memphis (2008 (Note: Vacated due to academic ineligibility and impermissible benefits given to Derrick Rose))	–
Horizon (Note: Known as the Midwestern City Conference from 1979 to 1985 and the Midwestern Collegiate Conference from 1985 to 2001.)	Loyola Chicago (1985), Xavier (1990), Butler (2003, 2007), Milwaukee (2005)	–	–	Butler (2010, 2011)	–
Ivy	Princeton (1967, 2023), Columbia (1968), Cornell (2010)	Dartmouth (1958)	Princeton (1965), Penn (1979)	–	–
MAAC	–	Saint Peter's (2022)	–	–	–
MAC	Bowling Green (1963), Central Michigan (1975), Western Michigan (1976), Toledo (1979), Ball State (1990), Eastern Michigan (1991), Miami (Ohio) (1999), Ohio (2012)	Ohio (1964), Kent State (2002)	–	–	–
MEAC	–	–	–	–	–
MVC	Saint Louis (1957), Cincinnati (1958, 1966), Creighton (1962, 1964, 1974), Tulsa (1994, 1995), Southwest Missouri State (1999), Southern Illinois (1977, 2002, 2007), Wichita State (2006, 2015), Bradley (2006), Northern Iowa (2010), Loyola Chicago (2021)	Creighton (1941), Saint Louis (1952), Bradley (1955), Wichita State (1964, 1981), Drake (1970, 1971)	Oklahoma A&M (1949), Cincinnati (1960), Wichita State (1965, 2013), Drake (1969), Loyola Chicago (2018)	Bradley (1950, 1954), Cincinnati (1963), Indiana State (1979)	Oklahoma A&M (1945, 1946), Cincinnati (1961, 1962)
MW	Utah (2005), UNLV (2007), BYU (2011), San Diego State (2011, 2014, 2024), Nevada (2018)	–	–	San Diego State (2023)	–
NEC (Note: Known as the Eastern Collegiate Athletic Conference Metro from 1979 to 1988.)	–	–	–	–	–
OVC	Morehead State (1961), Austin Peay (1973)	–	–	–	–
Patriot (Note: Known as the Colonial League from 1986 to 1990, a period in which it was a football-only conference.)	–	–	–	–	–
SoCon	East Tennessee State (1968), Furman (1974), VMI (1977), Chattanooga (1997)	VMI (1976), Davidson (1968, 1969, 2008)	–	–	–
Southland	Lamar (1980), Louisiana Tech (1985)	–	–	–	–
SWAC	–	–	–	–	–
Summit (Note: Known as the Association of Mid-Continent Universities from 1982 to 1989 and the Mid-Continent Conference (MCC) until 2007.)	Cleveland State (1986), Valparaiso (1998), Oral Roberts (2021)	–	–	–	–
Sun Belt	Western Kentucky (1993, 2008)	UAB (1982)	UNC Charlotte (1977)	–	–
WCC (Note: Known as the California Basketball Association from 1952 to 1956 and the West Coast Athletic Conference (WCAC) from 1956 to 1989.)	Santa Clara (1970), Pacific (1971), Pepperdine (1976), San Francisco (1979), Gonzaga (2000, 2001, 2006, 2009, 2016, 2018, 2023, 2024), St. Mary's (California) (2010)	St. Mary's (California) (1959), Pacific (1967), Santa Clara (1969), San Francisco (1974), Loyola Marymount (1990), Gonzaga (1999, 2015, 2019)	Santa Clara (1952), San Francisco (1957)	Gonzaga (2017, 2021)	San Francisco (1955, 1956)
WAC (Note: Rebranding as the United Athletic Conference after the 2025–26 season.)	Colorado State (1969), New Mexico (1974), Wyoming (1987), Utah (1991, 1996), UTEP (1992), Nevada (2004)	BYU (1981), Utah (1997), Tulsa (2000)	Utah (1966)	Utah (1998)	–

==== Defunct conferences and independents ====
This table shows teams that saw success in the tournament from later defunct conferences, or were independents.

One conference listed, the Southwest Conference, was universally considered a major conference throughout its history. Of its final eight members, seven are now in power conferences — four in the Big 12, two in the SEC, and one in the ACC. The eighth, Rice, is now in the American, which arguably became a mid-major basketball conference when three of its most prominent athletic brands moved to the Big 12 in 2023, followed by SMU's 2024 departure for the ACC. Another member that left during the SWC's last decade, Arkansas, has been in the SEC since leaving the SWC in 1992. The Metro Conference, which operated from 1975 to 1995, is not listed because it was considered a major basketball conference throughout its history. Louisville, which was a member for the league's entire existence, won both of its NCAA-recognized titles (1980, 1986) while in the Metro. It was one of the two leagues that merged to form Conference USA. The other league involved in the merger, the Great Midwest Conference, was arguably a major conference; it was formed in 1990, with play starting in 1991, when several of the Metro's strongest basketball programs left that league.

Mid-Major Conference	Sweet Sixteen	Elite Eight	Final Four	Championship game	National champion
Border Intercollegiate Athletic Conference (Note: Established in 1931 and dissolved in 1962.)	New Mexico State (1952)	Arizona State (1961)	–	–	–
East Coast Conference (Note: Established in 1958 and dissolved in 1994.)	–	Saint Joseph's (1981)	–	–	–
Eastern Intercollegiate Basketball League (Note: Established in 1901 and dissolved in 1955, though claimed by the Ivy League as a part of its own history.)	–	Dartmouth (1941)	–	Dartmouth (1942, 1944)	–
Great Midwest Conference (Note: Established in 1990 and merged into Conference USA in 1995.)	Marquette (1994), Memphis (1995)	Memphis State (1992), Cincinnati (1993)	Cincinnati (1992)	–	–
Metropolitan New York Conference (Note: Established in 1933 and dissolved in 1963.)	NYU (1943, 1946, 1951, 1962, 1963), Manhattan (1958)	City College of New York (1947)	NYU (1960)	NYU (1952)	City College of New York (1950)
Middle Atlantic Conference (Note: Established in 1912 and became a Division III conference after 1974.)	Saint Joseph's (1959, 1960, 1962, 1965, 1966)	Saint Joseph's (1963)	Saint Joseph's (1961)	–	–
Mountain States Conference (Note: Established in 1938 and known as the Skyline Conference from 1951 to 1962 before the conference dissolved in early 1962.)	BYU (1957)	Wyoming (1941), BYU (1950, 1951)	Utah State (1939)	–	Wyoming (1943)
New Jersey-New York 7 Conference (Note: Established in 1976 and dissolved in 1979.)	–	St. John's (1979)	–	–	–
Southern Intercollegiate Athletic Association (Note: Established in 1894 and dissolved in 1942.)	–	Western Kentucky (1940)	–	–	–
Southwest Conference (Note: Established in 1914 and dissolved in 1996.)	Texas A&M (1956, 1969, 1980)	Texas (1939, 1943, 1947, 1990), Rice (1940, 1942)	Texas (1943, 1947)	Houston (1983, 1984)	–
Western New York Little Three Conference (Note: Established in 1946 and dissolved in 1958.)	Canisius (1957)	Canisius (1955, 1956)	–	–	–
Yankee Conference (Note: Established in 1946 by former members of the New England Conference, which was founded in 1938 but never placed a team in the NCAA tournament; became a football-only conference in 1976 and dissolved in 1997.)	UConn (1956, 1976)	UConn (1964)	–	–	–
Independents	Montana State (1951), Dayton (1952, 1965, 1966, 1974), DePaul (1953, 1959, 1960, 1965, 1976, 1984, 1986 (Note: Vacated by the NCAA), 1987), Seattle (1953, 1955, 1956, 1964), Marquette (1959, 1968, 1971, 1972, 1973, 1979), Butler (1962), Utah State (1962, 1964), St. Bonaventure (1968), Niagara (1970), Cincinnati (1975), Detroit (1977)	Brown (1939), Springfield (1940), Marquette (1955, 1969, 1976), Oklahoma City (1957), Boston University (1959), Utah State (1970), DePaul (1978), Dayton (1984)	Duquesne (1940), DePaul (1943, 1979), Bradley (1955), New Mexico State (1970), St. Bonaventure (1970), Rutgers (1976)	Bradley (1954), La Salle (1955), Seattle (1958), Dayton (1967), Jacksonville (1970), Marquette (1974)	Utah (1944), Holy Cross (1947), La Salle (1954), Loyola Chicago (1963), Texas Western (1966), Marquette (1977)

=== Coaching records ===
==== Most national championships ====
- 10 national championships

John Wooden (1964, 1965, 1967, 1968, 1969, 1970, 1971, 1972, 1973, 1975)

- 5 national championships

Mike Krzyzewski (1991, 1992, 2001, 2010, 2015)

- 4 national championships

Adolph Rupp (1948, 1949, 1951, 1958)

- 3 national championships

Jim Calhoun (1999, 2004, 2011)
Bob Knight (1976, 1981, 1987)
Roy Williams (2005, 2009, 2017)

- 2 national championships

Denny Crum (1980, 1986)
Billy Donovan (2006, 2007)
Dan Hurley (2023, 2024)
Henry Iba (1945, 1946)
Ed Jucker (1961, 1962)
Branch McCracken (1940, 1953)
Bill Self (2008, 2022)
Dean Smith (1982, 1993)
Phil Woolpert (1955, 1956)
Jay Wright (2016, 2018)

- 1 national championship

Phog Allen (1952)
Tony Bennett (2019)
Jim Boeheim (2003)
Larry Brown (1988)
John Calipari (2012)
Everett Dean (1942)
Scott Drew (2021)
Steve Fisher (1989)
Bud Foster (1941)
Todd Golden (2025)
Joe B. Hall (1978)
Jim Harrick (1995)
Don Haskins (1966)
Jud Heathcote (1979)
Howard Hobson (1939)
Nat Holman (1950)
George Ireland (1963)
Tom Izzo (2000)
Doggie Julian (1947)
Ken Loeffler (1954)
Rollie Massimino (1985)
Dusty May (2026)
Al McGuire (1977)
Frank McGuire (1957)
Pete Newell (1959)
Kevin Ollie (2014)
Lute Olson (1997)
Vadal Peterson (1944)
Rick Pitino (1996) (Note: Under Pitino, Louisville won the title in 2013, but the NCAA vacated the 2013 title in February 2018 as a result of a 2015 sex scandal.)
Nolan Richardson (1994)
Everett Shelton (1943)
Norm Sloan (1974)
Tubby Smith (1998)
Jerry Tarkanian (1990)
Fred Taylor (1960)
John Thompson (1984)
Jim Valvano (1983)
Gary Williams (2002)

==== National championships among active coaches ====
- 2 Dan Hurley (2023, 2024)
- 2 Bill Self (2008, 2022)
- 1 John Calipari (2012)
- 1 Scott Drew (2021)
- 1 Todd Golden (2025)
- 1 Tom Izzo (2000)
- 1 Dusty May (2026)
- 1 Rick Pitino (1996)

==== Schools winning a national championship under multiple coaches ====
- Five coaches

Kentucky: Adolph Rupp, Joe B. Hall, Rick Pitino, Tubby Smith, and John Calipari

- Three coaches

Kansas: Phog Allen, Larry Brown, and Bill Self
North Carolina: Frank McGuire, Dean Smith, and Roy Williams
UConn: Jim Calhoun, Kevin Ollie, and Dan Hurley

- Two coaches

Florida: Billy Donovan and Todd Golden
Indiana: Branch McCracken and Bob Knight
Michigan: Steve Fisher and Dusty May
Michigan State: Jud Heathcote and Tom Izzo
North Carolina State: Norm Sloan and Jim Valvano
UCLA: John Wooden and Jim Harrick
Villanova: Rollie Massimino and Jay Wright

==== Most teams from different schools taken to the Final Four ====
Rick Pitino is the only coach to have officially taken three teams to the Final Four: Providence (1987), Kentucky (1993, 1996, 1997) and Louisville (2005).

There are 15 coaches who have officially coached two schools to the Final Four – Roy Williams, Eddie Sutton, Frank McGuire, Lon Kruger, Hugh Durham, Jack Gardner, Lute Olson, Gene Bartow, Forddy Anderson, Lee Rose, Bob Huggins, Lou Henson, Kelvin Sampson, Jim Larrañaga, and Dusty May.

- Larry Brown took UCLA to the Final Four in 1980, but the appearance was vacated due to NCAA violations. He also took Kansas in 1986 and 1988.

=== Point differentials ===
Point differentials, or margin of victory, can be viewed either by the championship game, or by a team's performance over the whole tournament.

==== Championship victory margins ====
Widest margin of victory in a championship game

30 points, by UNLV in 1990 (103–73, over Duke)

Narrowest margin of victory in a championship game

1 point, on six occasions

- Indiana 69, Kansas 68 (1953)
- North Carolina 54, Kansas 53/3OT (1957)
- California 71, West Virginia 70 (1959)
- North Carolina 63, Georgetown 62 (1982)
- Indiana 74, Syracuse 73 (1987)
- Michigan 80, Seton Hall 79/OT (1989)

Championship games that went to overtime

Eight times the championship game has been tied at the end of regulation. On one of those occasions (1957) the game went into double and then triple overtime.

- Utah 42, Dartmouth 40 (1944)
- North Carolina 54, Kansas 53/3OT (1957)
- Cincinnati 70, Ohio St. 65 (1961)
- Loyola 60, Cincinnati 58 (1963)
- Michigan 80, Seton Hall 79 (1989)
- Arizona 84, Kentucky 79 (1997)
- Kansas 75, Memphis 68 (2008)
- Virginia 85, Texas Tech 77 (2019)

==== Accumulated victory margins ====
Largest point differential accumulated over the entire tournament by championship teams

Teams that played 6 games

- +140 UConn 2024
- +129 Kentucky 1996
- +124 Villanova 2016
- +121 North Carolina 2009
- +120 UConn 2023
- +114 Michigan 2026

Teams that played 5 games

- +115 Loyola Chicago 1963
- +113 Indiana 1981
- +104 Michigan State 1979
- +69 San Francisco 1955
- +66 Indiana 1976

Teams that played 4 games

- +95 UCLA 1967
- +85 UCLA 1968
- +78 Ohio State 1960
- +76 UCLA 1969
- +72 UCLA 1970
- +72 UCLA 1972

Teams that played 3 games

- +56 Oklahoma A&M 1945
- +52 Kentucky 1949
- +51 Indiana 1940
- +47 Kentucky 1948
- +46 Oregon 1939

Teams winning the championship with a margin of 10 points in every game of the tournament

Achieved 14 times by 10 schools

- Oregon (1939)
- Kentucky (1949)
- San Francisco (1956)
- Ohio State (1960)
- UCLA (1967, 1970 and 1973)
- Michigan State (1979 and 2000)
- Indiana (1981)
- Duke (2001)
- North Carolina (2009)
- Villanova (2018)
- UConn (2023 and 2024)

=== Seed pairing results ===
Since the inception of the 64-team tournament in 1985, each seed-pairing has played 164 games in the Round of 64, with the following results:

==== Round of 64 results ====
- The No. 1 seed is 162–2 against the No. 16 seed (.988)
- The No. 2 seed is 153–11 against the No. 15 seed (.933)
- The No. 3 seed is 141–23 against the No. 14 seed (.860)
- The No. 4 seed is 131–33 against the No. 13 seed (.799)
- The No. 5 seed is 106–58 against the No. 12 seed (.646)
- The No. 6 seed is 100–64 against the No. 11 seed (.610)
- The No. 7 seed is 101–63 against the No. 10 seed (.616)
- The No. 8 seed is 77–87 against the No. 9 seed (.470)

==== Round of 32 results ====
- In the 1/16 vs. 8/9 bracket:

	vs. No. 8	vs. No. 9	Total
No. 1	61–16 (.792)	78–7 (.918)	139–23 (.858)
No. 16	–	0–2 (.000)	0–2 (.000)
Total	16–61 (.208)	9–78 (.103)	

- In the 2/15 vs. 7/10 bracket:

	vs. No. 7	vs. No. 10	Total
No. 2	68–27 (.716)	38–20 (.655)	106–47 (.693)
No. 15	4–2 (.667)	0–5 (.000)	4–7 (.364)
Total	29–72 (.287)	25–38 (.397)	

- In the 3/14 vs. 6/11 bracket:

	vs. No. 6	vs. No. 11	Total
No. 3	50–34 (.595)	36–21 (.632)	86–55 (.610)
No. 14	2–14 (.125)	0–7 (.000)	2–21 (.087)
Total	48–52 (.480)	28–36 (.438)	

- In the 4/13 vs. 5/12 bracket:

	vs. No. 5	vs. No. 12	Total
No. 4	47–38 (.553)	33–13 (.717)	80–51 (.611)
No. 13	3–18 (.143)	3–9 (.250)	6–27 (.182)
Total	56–50 (.528)	22–36 (.379)	

==== Round of 16 results ====
- In the 1/8/9/16 vs. 4/5/12/13 bracket:

	vs. No. 4	vs. No. 5	vs. No. 12	vs. No. 13	Total
No. 1	46–18 (.719)	40–11 (.784)	20–0 (1.000)	4–0 (1.000)	110–29 (.791)
No. 8	6–5 (.545)	2–0 (1.000)	0–2 (.000)	1–0 (1.000)	9–7 (.563)
No. 9	3–2 (.600)	2–1 (.667)	–	1–0 (1.000)	6–3 (.667)
No. 16	–	–	–	–	–
Total	25–55 (.313)	12–44 (.214)	2–20 (.091)	0–6 (.000)	

- In the 2/7/10/15 vs. 3/6/11/14 bracket:

	vs. No. 3	vs. No. 6	vs. No. 11	vs. No. 14	Total
No. 2	33–20 (.623)	25–8 (.758)	16–4 (.800)	–	74–32 (.698)
No. 7	6–10 (.375)	3–5 (.375)	0–4 (.000)	1–0 (1.000)	10–19 (.345)
No. 10	4–10 (.286)	2–4 (.333)	2–2 (.500)	1–0 (1.000)	9–16 (.360)
No. 15	1–2 (.333)	0–1 (.000)	–	–	1–3 (.250)
Total	42–44 (.488)	18–30 (.375)	10–18 (.357)	0–2 (.000)	

==== Regional finals results ====
	vs. No. 2	vs. No. 3	vs. No. 6	vs. No. 7	vs. No. 10	vs. No. 11	vs. No. 14	vs. No. 15	Total
No. 1	28–25 (.528)	18–10 (.643)	9–2 (.818)	4–0 (1.000)	5–1 (.833)	4–4 (.500)	–	–	68–42 (.617)
No. 4	4–3 (.571)	4–2 (.667)	3–1 (.750)	2–3 (.400)	2–0 (1.000)	0–1 (.000)	–	–	15–10 (.600)
No. 5	5–1 (.833)	1–2 (.333)	2–0 (1.000)	–	1–0 (1.000)	–	–	–	9–3 (.750)
No. 8	3–2 (.600)	0–1 (.000)	1–0 (1.000)	1–0 (1.000)	–	–	–	1–0 (1.000)	6–3 (.667)
No. 9	1–0 (1.000)	1–3 (.250)	–	–	–	0–1 (.000)	–	–	2–4 (.333)
No. 12	0–2 (.000)	–	–	–	–	–	–	–	0–2 (.000)
No. 13	–	–	–	–	–	–	–	–	–
No. 16	–	–	–	–	–	–	–	–	–
Total	33–41 (.446)	18–24 (.429)	3–15 (.167)	3–7 (.300)	1–8 (.111)	6–4 (.600)	–	0–1 (.000)	

== Host cities ==
=== Final Four venues ===
Until 1952, the national championship was played at a separate site from the national semifinal games, which were considered regional finals. Forty-one venues have hosted the final rounds, and several have hosted more than five times:

- Municipal Auditorium in Kansas City hosted nine times between 1940 and 1960
- Madison Square Garden in New York hosted seven times between 1943 and 1950
- Freedom Hall in Louisville hosted six times between 1958 and 1969
- Caesars Superdome in New Orleans hosted six times between 1982 and 2022

Among cities, Kansas City has hosted the Final Four a total of ten times, with Kemper Arena hosting in 1988 in addition to Municipal Auditorium. Indianapolis has hosted a total of eight times between 1980 and 2021 across three venues: Market Square Arena, the RCA Dome, and Lucas Oil Stadium. The state of Texas has hosted the Final Four eleven times in Houston, Dallas, San Antonio, and Arlington between 1971 and 2023.

For most of the tournament's history, the national championship game and national semifinal games have been played in basketball arenas. The first instance of a domed stadium being used for the Final Four was the Houston Astrodome in 1971, but the Final Four would not return to a dome until 1982 when the Louisiana Superdome in New Orleans hosted the event for the first time. The last on-campus venue to host the Final Four was University Arena in Albuquerque, New Mexico, in 1983. The last venue primarily built for a college basketball team to host the Final Four was Rupp Arena in Lexington, Kentucky, in 1985. The last NBA arena to host the Final Four was the Meadowlands Arena, then known as Continental Airlines Arena, in 1996. From 1997 to 2013, the NCAA required that the Final Four be played in domed stadiums with a minimum capacity of 40,000. As of 2009, the minimum was increased to 70,000, by adding additional seating on the floor of the dome, and raising the court on a platform three feet above the dome's floor.

In September 2012, the NCAA began preliminary discussions on the possibility of returning occasional Final Fours to basketball-specific arenas in major metropolitan areas. According to ESPN.com writer Andy Katz, when Mark Lewis was hired as NCAA executive vice president for championships during 2012, "he took out a United States map and saw that both coasts are largely left off from hosting the Final Four." Lewis added in an interview with Katz,

I don't know where this will lead, if anywhere, but the right thing is to sit down and have these conversations and see if we want our championship in more than eight cities or do we like playing exclusively in domes. None of the cities where we play our championship is named New York, Boston, Los Angeles, Chicago or Miami. We don't play on a campus. We play in professional football arenas.

Under then-current criteria, only eleven stadiums could be considered as Final Four locations. On June 12, 2013, Katz reported that the NCAA had changed its policy. In July 2013, the NCAA had a portal available on its website for venues to make Final Four proposals in the 2017–2020 period, and there were no restrictions on proposals based on venue size. Also, the NCAA decided that future regionals will no longer be held in domes. In Katz's report, Lewis indicated that the use of domes for regionals was intended as a dry run for future Final Four venues, but this particular policy was no longer necessary because all of the Final Four sites from 2014 to 2016 had already hosted regionals. The policy was changed to only be used if a new venue would be hosting the subsequent tournament's Final Four. Under the current policy, the 2030 regionals could be held at Mercedes-Benz Stadium in Atlanta, which opened in 2017, as it will be hosting its first Final Four in 2031 after its planned 2020 hosting was cancelled.

In 2004, the NCAA signed a memorandum of understanding with the city of Indianapolis, guaranteeing that the city would host one of five events—men's preliminary games, the men's Final Four, women's preliminary games, the women's Final Four, and the NCAA convention—at least once every five years, in exchange for land to expand the NCAA's Indianapolis headquarters, and for Indianapolis to serve as a designated backup city for the Final Four. This memorandum was stated to be in effect through 2039; in 2014, Visit Indy CEO Leonard Hoops stated that this agreement was only through 2010, and that Indianapolis participates in competitive bids for the events as with other cities.

=== Home court advantage ===
On several occasions, NCAA tournament teams have played their games in their home arena. In 1959, Louisville played at its regular home of Freedom Hall; however, the Cardinals lost to West Virginia in the semifinals. In 1984, Kentucky defeated Illinois, 54–51 in the Elite Eight on its home court of Rupp Arena. Also in 1984, #6 seeded Memphis played the first two rounds on its home court, defeating Oral Roberts and Purdue. In 1985, Dayton played its first-round game against Villanova (it lost 51–49) on its home floor. In 1986 (beating Brown before losing to Navy) and '87 (beating Georgia Southern and Western Kentucky), Syracuse played the first 2 rounds of the NCAA tournament in the Carrier Dome. Also in 1986, LSU played in Baton Rouge on its home floor for the first 2 rounds despite being an 11th seed (beating Purdue and Memphis State). In 1987, Arizona lost to UTEP on its home floor in the first round. In 2015, Dayton played at its regular home of UD Arena, and the Flyers beat Boise State in the First Four.

Since the inception of the modern Final Four in 1952, only once has a team played a Final Four on its actual home court—Louisville in 1959. But through the 2015 tournament, three other teams have played the Final Four in their home cities, one other team has played in its metropolitan area, and six additional teams have played the Final Four in their home states through the 2015 tournament. Kentucky (1958 in Louisville), UCLA (1968 and 1972 in Los Angeles, 1975 in San Diego), and North Carolina State (1974 in Greensboro) won the national title; Louisville (1959 at its home arena, Freedom Hall); Purdue (1980 in Indianapolis) lost in the Final Four; and California (1960 in the San Francisco Bay Area), Duke (1994 in Charlotte), Michigan State (2009 in Detroit), and Butler (2010 in Indianapolis) lost in the final.

In 1960, Cal had nearly as large an edge as Louisville had the previous year, only having to cross the San Francisco Bay to play in the Final Four at the Cow Palace in Daly City; the Golden Bears lost in the championship game to Ohio State. UCLA had a similar advantage in 1968 and 1972 when it advanced to the Final Four at the Los Angeles Memorial Sports Arena, not many miles from the Bruins' homecourt of Pauley Pavilion (also UCLA's home arena before the latter venue opened in 1965, and again during the 2011–12 season while Pauley was closed for renovations); unlike Louisville and Cal, the Bruins won the national title on both occasions. Butler lost the 2010 title six miles (9.7 km) from its Indianapolis campus.

Before the Final Four was established, the east and west regionals were held at separate sites, with the winners advancing to the title game. During that era, three New York City teams, all from Manhattan, played in the east regional at Madison Square Garden—frequently used as a "big-game" venue by each team—and advanced at least to the national semifinals. NYU won the east regional in 1945 but lost in the title game, also held at the Garden, to Oklahoma A&M. CCNY played in the east regional in both 1947 and 1950; the Beavers lost in the 1947 east final to eventual champion Holy Cross but won the 1950 east regional and national titles at the Garden.

In 1974, North Carolina State won the NCAA tournament without leaving its home state of North Carolina. The team was put in the east region, and played its regional games at its home arena Reynolds Coliseum. NC State played the Final Four and national championship games at nearby Greensboro Coliseum.

While not its home state, Kansas has played in the championship game in Kansas City, Missouri, only 45 minutes from the campus in Lawrence, Kansas, on four occasions. In 1940, 1953, and 1957 the Jayhawks lost the championship game each time at Municipal Auditorium. In 1988, playing at Kansas City's Kemper Arena, Kansas won the championship, over Big Eight rival Oklahoma. Similarly, in 2005, Illinois played in St. Louis, Missouri, where it enjoyed a noticeable home court advantage, yet still lost in the championship game to North Carolina.

In 2002, Texas was paired with Mississippi State in Dallas despite being the lower seed. The #6 seeded Longhorns defeated the #3 seeded Bulldogs 68–64 in front of a predominately Texas crowd.

=== Previously banned venues ===
==== South Carolina ====
The NCAA had banned the Bon Secours Wellness Arena, originally known as Bi-Lo Center, and Colonial Life Arena, originally Colonial Center, in South Carolina from hosting tournament games, despite their sizes (16,000 and 18,000 seats, respectively) because of an NAACP protest at the Bi-Lo Center during the 2002 first- and second-round tournament games over that state's refusal to completely remove the Confederate Battle Flag from the state capitol grounds, although it had already been relocated from atop the capitol dome to a less prominent place in 2000. Following requests by the NAACP and Black Coaches Association, the Bi-Lo Center, and the newly built Colonial Center, which was built for purposes of hosting the tournament, were banned from hosting any future tournament events. As a result of the removal of the battle flag from the South Carolina State Capitol, the NCAA lifted its ban on South Carolina hosting games in 2015, and it was able to host in 2017 due to North Carolina House Bill 2 (see next section).

==== North Carolina ====
On September 12, 2016, the NCAA stripped the state of North Carolina of hosting rights for seven upcoming college sports tournaments and championships held by the association, including early-round games of the 2017 NCAA Division I men's basketball tournament scheduled for the Greensboro Coliseum. The NCAA argued that House Bill 2 made it "challenging to guarantee that host communities can help deliver [an inclusive atmosphere]". Bon Secours Wellness Arena was able to secure the bid to be the replacement site. In an ironic twist, Durham-based Duke would suffer a defeat to South Carolina in a second-round game at Greenville that year.

== 75th anniversary ==
Ahead of the 75th anniversary of the tournament, on December 11, 2012, the NCAA announced the 75 best players, the 25 best teams, and the 35 best moments in tournament history. The NCAA started with a group of more than 100 nominees and then analyzed the tournament statistics for each player to select the 75 finalists from which the public would select the top 15 via an online poll in January 2013.

The results of the public vote were revealed at the 2013 NCAA Final Four. Among the 15 players, ten had won a championship, 11 were declared the Most Outstanding Player of the tournament at least once, and all made the Final Four at least once. Abdul-Jabbar, Laettner, Lucas, Olajuwon, and Walton all reached the Final Four in every season they played college basketball, and an additional five players went to multiple Final Fours. Hill, Laettner, Russell, and Walton all won two championships, and Abdul-Jabbar won three championships. Lucas and Walton repeated as Most Outstanding Players, and Abdul-Jabbar was declared the MOP all three seasons he played. Bradley, Lucas, Olajuwon, and West were all declared MOP without winning the championship. Twelve players competed in the tournament every year they played college basketball.

UCLA and Duke were the only teams with multiple honorees. Christian Laettner and Grant Hill are the only teammates, they played together for Duke and won two championships in 1991 and 1992. Larry Bird and Magic Johnson competed against each other in the 1979 NCAA championship game, and Patrick Ewing and Michael Jordan competed against each other in the 1982 NCAA championship game as freshmen. Oscar Robertson and Jerry West competed during the same seasons, but never met in the tournament.

Eleven of the players have been enshrined in the Naismith Memorial Basketball Hall of Fame and the College Basketball Hall of Fame as players. Michael Jordan and Olajuwon have only been enshrined in the Naismith Memorial as players, and Christian Laettner and Danny Manning have only been inducted into the CBHOF as players. Bill Russell has also been enshrined in the Naismith Memorial as a coach.

Patrick Ewing (Georgetown) and Danny Manning (Tulsa and Wake Forest) have appeared in the tournament as head coaches. Manning has also recorded six appearances, two Final Fours, one runner-up, and one championship as an assistant for Kansas.

Player	Team	Years	Freshman Season	Sophomore Season	Junior Season	Senior Season
Kareem Abdul-Jabbar	UCLA	1966–69	(Note: Before 1972, Freshmen were not allowed to play on the Varsity team and instead played on the Freshmen team. They were therefore ineligible for the NCAA tournament and were not considered contributors to any accomplishments of the Varsity team during their Freshman season.)	Champion & MOP	Champion & MOP	Champion & MOP
Larry Bird	Indiana State	1976–79				Runner-Up
Bill Bradley	Princeton	1962–65			Sweet Sixteen	Final Four & MOP
Patrick Ewing	Georgetown	1981–85	Final Four	Second Round	Champion & MOP	Runner-Up
Grant Hill	Duke	1990–94	Champion	Champion	Second Round	Runner-Up
Magic Johnson	Michigan State	1977–79	Elite Eight	Champion & MOP	(Note: Player left for the NBA before his senior season)	
Michael Jordan	North Carolina	1981–84	Champion	Elite Eight	Sweet Sixteen	
Christian Laettner	Duke	1988–92	Final Four	Runner-Up	Champion & MOP	Champion
Jerry Lucas	Ohio State	1959–62		Champion & MOP	Runner-Up & MOP	Runner-Up
Danny Manning	Kansas	1984–88	Second Round	Final Four	Second Round	Champion & MOP
Hakeem Olajuwon	Houston	1981–84	Final Four	Runner-Up & MOP	Runner-Up	
Oscar Robertson	Cincinnati	1957–60		Sweet Sixteen (Note: Cincinnati received a bye to the regional semifinals, which they lost. They subsequently won the regional third place game.)	Final Four	Final Four
Bill Russell	San Francisco	1953–56			Champion & MOP	Champion
Bill Walton	UCLA	1972–74		Champion & MOP	Champion & MOP	Final Four
Jerry West	West Virginia	1957–60		First Round (Note: West Virginia competed in the first round, which had a total of 18 teams competing. Seven teams received a bye to the Sweet Sixteen (regional semifinals).)	Runner-Up & MOP	Sweet Sixteen

== Popular culture ==
The NCAA tournament and the Super Bowl are two notable American sports events that draw both fans and non-fans. Many people are connected to a school in the tournament, having been an alumnus of one of the participants, knowing someone from the college or living close to the school.

=== Bracketology and pools ===
There are pools or private gambling-related contests in which participants predict the outcome of each tournament game, filling out a complete tournament bracket in the process. The popularity of this practice grew around 1985 when the tournament expanded to 64 games, forming four symmetrical regions with 15 games apiece to decide the Final Four. In 2023, Sports Illustrated reported that an estimated 60 to 100 million brackets are filled out each year. Filling out a tournament bracket with predictions is called the practice of "bracketology"; sports programming during the tournament often features commentators comparing the accuracy of their predictions. On The Dan Patrick Show, a wide variety of celebrities from various fields (such as Darius Rucker, Charlie Sheen, Neil Patrick Harris, Ellen DeGeneres, Dave Grohl and Brooklyn Decker) have posted full brackets with predictions. Former U.S. president Barack Obama began releasing his bracket annually in 2009, his first year in office. While in office, he filled out the men's and women's brackets on ESPN with reporter Andy Katz, and they were also posted on the White House website. He continued releasing his picks after leaving office.

There are many tournament prediction scoring systems. Most award points for correctly picking the winning team in a particular match-up, with increasingly more points being given for correctly predicting later round winners. Some provide bonus points for correctly predicting upsets, the amount of the bonus varying based on the degree of upset. Some just provide points for wins by correctly picked teams in the brackets.

There are 2^63 or about 9.22 quintillion unique combinations of winners in a 64-team NCAA bracket, meaning that without considering seed number, the odds of picking a perfect bracket are about 9.22 quintillion to 1. Including the First Four, the number of unique combinations increases to 2^67 or about 147.57 quintillion.

There are numerous awards and prizes given by companies for anyone who can make the perfect bracket. One of the largest was done by a partnership between Quicken Loans and Berkshire Hathaway, which was backed by Warren Buffett, with a $1 billion prize to any person(s) who could correctly predict the outcome of the 2014 tournament. Nobody was able to complete the challenge and win the $1 billion prize.

=== Workplace productivity ===
During the tourney, American workers take extended lunch breaks at sports bars to follow the game. They also use company computer and internet access to view games, scores and bracket results. Some workplaces block access to sports and entertainment sites but the rise of mobile devices and live-streamed games bypassed those restrictions and even workers not normally in front of computers then had access. Employees spend an estimated average of six hours on the tournament each year. As of 2019, U.S. employers were projected to lose around $13 billion due to lost productivity during the tournament.

=== Tournament-associated terms ===
As indicated below, none of these phrases are exclusively used in regard to the NCAA tournament. Nonetheless, they’re widely associated with the tournament, sometimes for legal reasons and sometimes as part of the American sports vernacular.

==== March Madness ====
March Madness is a registered trademark currently owned exclusively by the NCAA, but it is also a popular term for season-ending basketball tournaments played in March.

H. V. Porter, an official with the Illinois High School Association (and later a member of the Basketball Hall of Fame), was the first person to use March Madness to describe a basketball tournament. Porter published an essay named March Madness during 1939, and during 1942, he used the phrase in a poem, Basketball Ides of March. Through the years the use of March Madness increased, especially in Illinois, Indiana and other parts of the Midwest. During this period, the term was used almost exclusively in reference to state high school tournaments. During 1977, Jim Enright published a book about the Illinois tournament entitled March Madness.

Fans began associating the term with the NCAA tournament during the early 1980s. Evidence suggests that CBS sportscaster Brent Musburger, who had worked for many years in Chicago before joining CBS, popularized the term during the annual tournament broadcasts. The NCAA has credited Bob Walsh of the Seattle Organizing Committee for starting the March Madness celebration in 1984.

Only during the 1990s did either the IHSA or the NCAA think about trademarking the term and by that time a small television production company named Intersport had already trademarked it. IHSA eventually bought the trademark rights from Intersport, and then went to court to establish its primacy. IHSA sued GTE Vantage, an NCAA licensee that used March Madness for a computer game based on the college tournament. During 1996, in a historic ruling, Illinois High School Association v. GTE Vantage, Inc., the United States Court of Appeals for the Seventh Circuit created the concept of a "dual-use trademark", granting both the IHSA and NCAA the right to trademark the term for their own purposes.

After the ruling, the NCAA and IHSA joined forces and created the March Madness Athletic Association to coordinate the licensing of the trademark and investigate possible trademark infringement. One such case involved a company that had obtained the internet domain name marchmadness.com and was using it to post information about the NCAA tournament. During 2003, by March Madness Athletic Association v. Netfire, Inc., the United States Court of Appeals for the Fifth Circuit decided that March Madness was not a generic term and ordered Netfire to relinquish the domain name to the NCAA.

Later during the 2000s, the IHSA relinquished its ownership share in the trademark although it retained the right to use the term in association with high school championships. During October 2010, the NCAA reached a settlement with Intersport, paying $17.2 million for the latter company's license to use the trademark.

Several Division I conferences have used the "Madness" brand, coupled with a non-infringing word, to describe their own tournaments:

- Big Sky Conference – Starch Madness. Since 2019, the conference has held its men's and women's tournaments concurrently in Boise, Idaho, the capital of a state well-known for potato production.
- Ivy League – Ivy Madness. Like the Big Sky, the Ivies hold their men's and women's tournaments concurrently at a single site.
- Missouri Valley Conference – Arch Madness, used for the men's tournament only. The tournament has been held in St. Louis, whose most iconic landmark is the Gateway Arch, since 1991.

==== Sweet Sixteen ====
This is a popular term for the regional semifinal round of the tournament, consisting of the final 16 teams. As in the case of March Madness, this was first used by a high school federation –in this case, the Kentucky High School Athletic Association (KHSAA), which has used the term for decades to describe its own season-ending tournaments. It officially registered the trademark in 1988. Unlike the situation with March Madness, the KHSAA has retained sole ownership of the "Sweet Sixteen" trademark; it licenses the term to the NCAA for use in collegiate tournaments.

==== Elite Eight ====
The Elite Eight is a popular term to describe the two teams in each of the four regional championship games. The NCAA officially uses the term for the eight-team final phase of the Division II men's and women's basketball tournaments. The winners of these games in the D-I tournament advance to the Final Four (the NCAA does not use the term Final Four in D-II). The NCAA trademarked this phrase in 1997. Like March Madness, the phrase Elite Eight originally referred to the Illinois High School Boys Basketball Championship, the single-elimination high school basketball tournament run by the Illinois High School Association. In 1956, when the IHSA finals were reduced from sixteen to eight teams, a new nickname for Sweet Sixteen was needed and Elite Eight won the vote. The IHSA trademarked the term in 1995; the trademark rights are now held by the March Madness Athletic Association, a joint venture between the NCAA and IHSA formed after a 1996 court case allowed both organizations to use March Madness for their own tournaments.

==== Final Four ====
The term Final Four refers to the last four teams remaining in the playoff tournament. These are the champions of the tournament's four regional brackets and remain the only teams on the tournament's final weekend. (While the term Final Four was not used during the early decades of the tournament, this term has been applied retroactively to include the last four teams in tournaments from earlier years, even when only two brackets existed.)

Some claim that Final Four was first used to describe the final games of Indiana's annual high school basketball tournament. But the NCAA, which has a trademark on the term, says Final Four was originated by a Plain Dealer sportswriter, Ed Chay, in a 1975 article that appeared in the Official Collegiate Basketball Guide. The article stated that Marquette University "was one of the final four" of the 1974 tournament. The NCAA started capitalizing the term during 1978 and converting it to a trademark several years later.

During recent years, Final Four has been used for other sports besides basketball. Tournaments which use the term include the EuroLeague in basketball, national basketball competitions in several European countries, and the now-defunct European Hockey League. Together with the name Final Four, these tournaments have adopted an NCAA-style format in which the four surviving teams compete in a single-elimination tournament held in one place, typically, during one weekend. The derivative term Frozen Four is used by the NCAA to refer to the final rounds of the Division I men's and women's ice hockey tournaments. Until 1999, it was just a popular nickname for the last two rounds of the hockey tournament; officially, it was also known as the Final Four.

==== Cinderella teams and Underdog teams ====
A Cinderella team, both in NCAA basketball and other sports, is one that achieves far greater success than would reasonably have been best expected. In the NCAA tournament, teams may earn the Cinderella title after multiple wins in a single tournament against higher seeded teams. The term first came into widespread usage in 1950, when the City College of New York unexpectedly won the tournament in the same month that a film adaptation of "Cinderella" was released in the United States.

Notable Cinderella teams include North Carolina State in 1983 (the subject of a 30 for 30 documentary titled Survive and Advance), Villanova in 1985 (the lowest-seeded team to ever win the tournament), LSU in 1986 (the only team to defeat the top three seeds in their region in the same tournament), UMBC in 2018 (the first No. 16 seed to defeat a No. 1 seed), Saint Peter's in 2022 (the first No. 15 seed to advance to the Elite Eight), and Fairleigh Dickinson (the second 16 seed to defeat a 1 seed) and Florida Atlantic (a 9 seed which had never won an NCAA tournament game before its Final Four run) in 2023.

== See also ==
- NCAA Division I women's basketball tournament
- NCAA Division II women's basketball tournament
- NCAA Division III women's basketball tournament
- NCAA Division II men's basketball tournament
- NCAA Division III men's basketball tournament
- Bracketology
- March Madness (song)
