= 1950 NCAA basketball championship game =

1950 NCAA Tournament Championship Game
National championship game
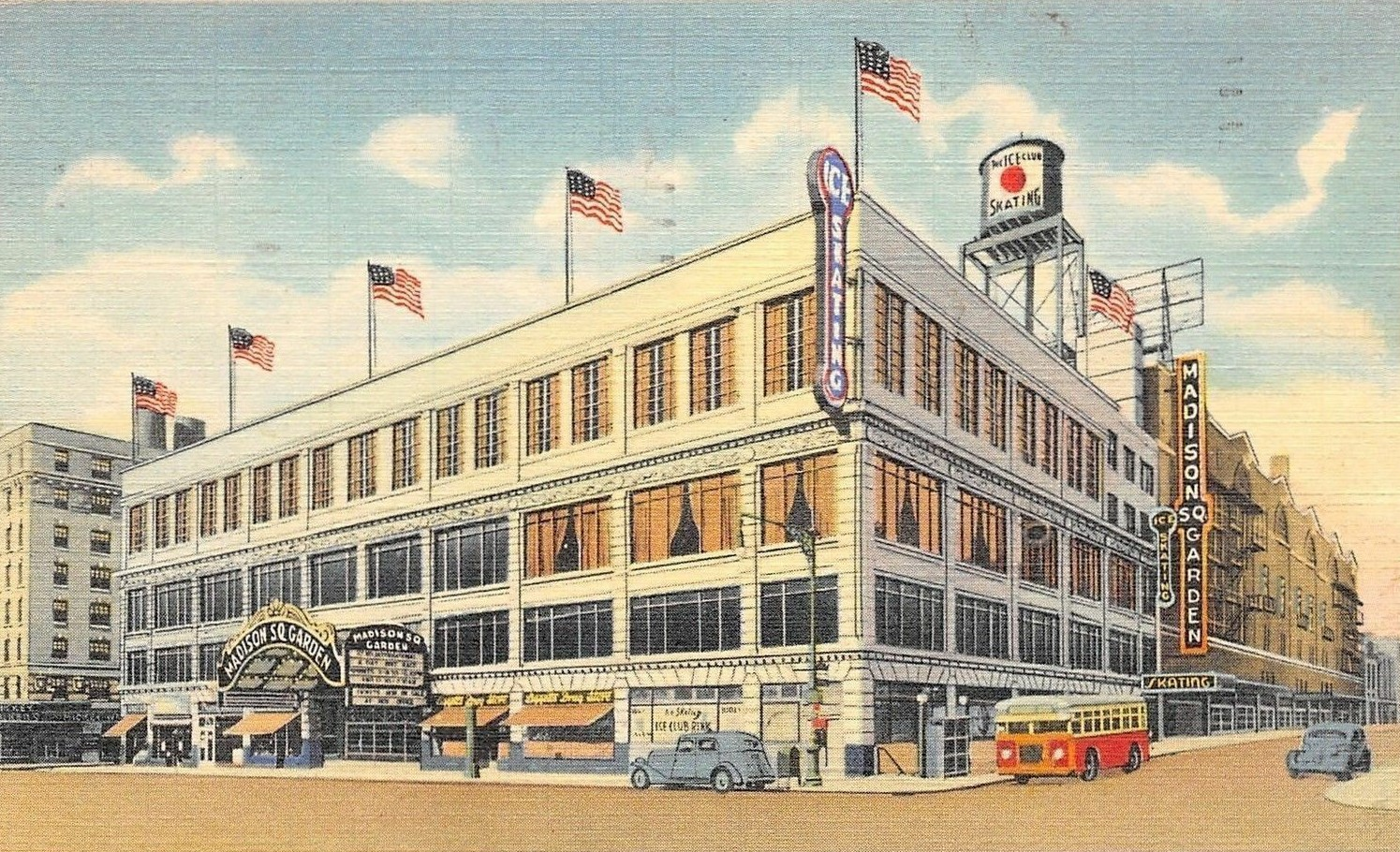
- Madison Square Garden in New York City hosted the championship game.
CCNY Beavers	Bradley Braves
MNYC	MVC
(23-5)	(32-4)
71	68
Head coach: Nat Holman	Head coach: Forddy Anderson
- AP: NR
- AP: 1
	1st half	2nd half	Total
CCNY Beavers	39	32	71
Bradley Braves	32	36	68
- Date: March 28, 1950
- Venue: Madison Square Garden, New York City
- MVP: Irwin Dambrot, CCNY

The 1950 NCAA University Division Basketball Championship Game was the finals of the 1950 NCAA basketball tournament and it determined the national champion for the 1949-50 NCAA men's basketball season. The game was played on March 28, 1950, at Madison Square Garden in New York City. It featured the CCNY Beavers of the Metropolitan New York Conference - the reigning NIT champions, and the Bradley Braves of the Missouri Valley Conference.

In a rematch of the NIT tournament final on March 18, the Beavers again defeated the Braves to win their only national championship, securing the only Grand Slam in the history of college basketball. Irwin Dambrot of CCNY was named the tournament's Most Outstanding Player, and head coach Nat Holman appeared on The Ed Sullivan Show. CCNY winning the national championship was voted the most exciting event in the history of college basketball at Madison Square Garden.

== Participating teams ==
=== CCNY Beavers ===
CCNY posted a 17–5 record during the regular season, but failed to attract any support in the final AP Top 20. The team was made up mostly of sophomores and was the last squad selected to play in Madison Square Garden's famed NIT, which had a 12-team field and at that time, was more prestigious than the NCAA tournament. Early on in the NCAA Tournament's days, which began in 1939, teams were allowed to participate in both it and the NIT. The NCAA later ruled that no team could compete in both tournaments, to avoid having another double champion.

People took notice when the Beavers thrashed defending champion San Francisco 65–46 in the opening round. CCNY then faced 3rd-ranked and two-time defending national champion Kentucky and their 7-foot center, Bill Spivey, in the second round. Kentucky was a racially segregated school from the Southeastern Conference, and several Kentucky players refused to shake hands with the black and Jewish CCNY players before the game. This incensed the CCNY players, who then proceeded to embarrass the Wildcats by an 89–50 score, handing Kentucky head coach Adolph Rupp his worst loss ever. The blowout win over Kentucky was even more impressive due to the fact that Kentucky had won the national championship in 1948, 1949, and would do so again in 1951. A Cinderella Team had now emerged in the tournament. CCNY then defeated Duquesne 62–52 in the semi-final round. In the NIT title game, the Beavers squared off against top-ranked Bradley, who had All-American Paul Unruh and the 5'8" speedster, Gene "Squeaky" Melchiorre. CCNY came out on top 69–61 to win the NIT title. Ed Warner of CCNY was awarded Most Valuable Player honors.

After winning the NIT title, the Beavers were immediately selected to participate in the NCAA tournament. In the opening round, the Beavers upset second-ranked Ohio State, 56–55. The Beavers then defeated fifth-ranked North Carolina State 78–73 in the Final Four to reach the national championship game.

==== Tournament results ====
- East
  - CCNY 56, Ohio State 55
- Final Four
  - CCNY 78, NC State 73

=== Bradley Braves ===
The Braves were the top-ranked team in the nation going into both the NIT and NCAA tournaments. They were led by All-American Paul Unruh and the 5'8" speedster, Gene "Squeaky" Melchiorre. They made it all the way to the NIT tournament final where they would face unranked CCNY, and were surprisingly upset by a 69–61 score. In the NCAA tournament, the Braves defeated UCLA in the opening round, and then defeated Baylor in the Final Four to reach the national championship game, where they would again be pitted against CCNY.

==== Tournament results ====
- West
  - Bradley 73, UCLA 59
- Final Four
  - Bradley 68, Baylor 66

== Game summary ==
March 28, 1950

CCNY Beavers 71, #1 Bradley Braves 68
Scoring by half: 39-32, 32-36
Pts: Irwin Dambrot 15; Asts: Floyd Layne 4	Pts: Gene Melchiorre 16; Asts: Gene Melchiorre 5

Madison Square Garden, New York City

== Aftermath ==
After winning the national title, CCNY was implicated in a point-shaving scandal. Players had taken money from gamblers in the point-shaving scandals during the 1948–1949 season and also during some regular-season games in the 1949–1950 season. No games were fixed during the post-season tournaments.

The scandal involved CCNY and six other schools, including three others in the New York Metropolitan Area: New York University, Long Island University (LIU) and Manhattan College, spreading to Bradley University, the University of Kentucky and the University of Toledo, involving 33 players in all, as well as organized crime. Head coach Nat Holman was cleared of any wrongdoing. Among the CCNY players taken into custody were All-America forward Ed Warner, center Ed Roman, and guard Al Roth, the three stars of CCNY's starting five that won both the NIT and national championships. The police had set up an undercover operation. The arrests were made in Penn Station when the players returned from Philadelphia, after CCNY had defeated Temple University, 95–71.

The scandal prompted the suspension of the basketball program. The school was moved from Division I to Division III and was banned from playing at Madison Square Garden. As a result of these sanctions, the CCNY basketball program was de–emphasized, and the school has never again appeared in either the NCAA or NIT tournaments. CCNY is the only NCAA Basketball Championship team that is no longer a member of Division I.
