= 1949–50 CCNY Beavers men's basketball team =

American college basketball season

1949–50 CCNY Beavers men's basketball
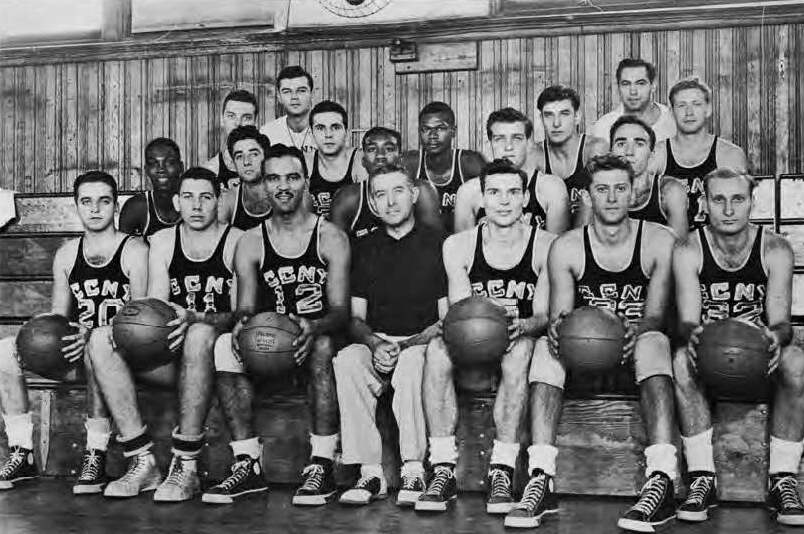

NCAA Tournament National Champions NIT champions

National Championship Game, W 71–68 vs. Bradley
- Conference: Metropolitan New York Conference
- Record: 24–5 (6–0 MTNY)
- Head coach: Nat Holman (31st season)
- Assistant coach: Bobby Sand

1949–50 Metropolitan New York Conference men's basketball standings
	Conf.				Overall
Team	W		L	PCT	W		L	PCT
CCNY	6	–	0	1.000	24	–	5	.828
Fordham	3	–	2	.600	15	–	12	.556
Brooklyn	2	–	2	.500	24	–	5	.828
No. 9 St. John's	3	–	3	.500	24	–	5	.828
Manhattan	3	–	3	.500	14	–	11	.560
NYU	1	–	4	.200	8	–	11	.421
St. Francis (NY)	0	–	4	.000	8	–	18	.308
Rankings from AP Poll

The 1949–50 CCNY Beavers men's basketball team represented the City College of New York. The head coach was Nat Holman, who was one of the game's greatest innovators and playmakers. Unlike today, when colleges recruit players from all over the country, the 1949–50 CCNY team was composed of "kids from the sidewalks of New York City," who had been recruited by Holman's assistant coach Harold "Bobby" Sand from Public Schools Athletic League (PSAL) schools such as Taft, Clinton, Boys, Erasmus, and Franklin High Schools.

== Background ==
The team's starting five was composed of two Black and three Jewish players. The team is the only team to win both the National Invitation Tournament and the NCAA tournament in the same year, by defeating Bradley University in the championship game of each tournament. The 1950 City team was also the first NCAA champion to have black players in its starting lineup. The players on the team were Ed Warner, Norm Mager, Irwin Dambrot, Alvin "Fats" Roth, Ed Roman, Floyd Layne, Herb Cohen, Ron Nadell, Leroy Watkins, Joe Galiber, and Arthur Glass. Students at CCNY, dubbed the poor man's Harvard because of its lofty academic standards, lived and died with every game, raising arena roofs with their unique school cheer:

"Allagaroo garoo gara,
Allagaroo garoo gara,
Ee-yah ee-yah,
Sis boom bah, Team! Team! Team!"

== NIT tournament commentary ==
CCNY had posted a 17–5 record during the regular season, but had failed to attract any support in the final AP Top 20. The team was made up mostly of sophomores and was the last squad selected to play in Madison Square Garden's famed NIT, which had a 12-team field and was at that time more prestigious than the NCAA tournament. People took notice when the Beavers thrashed defending champion San Francisco 65–46 in the opening round. CCNY then faced 3rd ranked and two-time defending NCAA champion Kentucky and their 7-foot center, Bill Spivey, in the second round. Kentucky was a racially segregated school from the Southeastern Conference, and several Wildcats refused to shake hands with the black and Jewish CCNY players before the game. This incensed the CCNY players, who then proceeded to dismantle the Kentucky team in every aspect of the game. The final score was CCNY 89, Kentucky 50, which was the worst ever defeat for an Adolph Rupp coached team. The blowout win over Kentucky was even more impressive due to the fact that Kentucky had won the NCAA tournament in 1948, 1949, and would win the tournament again the following year in 1951. A Cinderella Team had now emerged in the tournament. City College then defeated Duquesne 62–52 in the semi-final round. In the title game, the Beavers squared off against top ranked Bradley, who had All-American Paul Unruh and the 5'8" speedster, Gene "Squeaky" Melchiorre. CCNY came out on top 69–61 to win the tournament. Ed Warner of CCNY was awarded Most Valuable Player honors.

== NCAA tournament commentary ==
After CCNY's run to the NIT title, the Beavers were immediately selected to participate in the NCAA tournament. In the first round, City College nipped second ranked Ohio State, 56–55. The Beavers then defeated fifth ranked North Carolina State 78–73 to reach the title game. CCNY again faced top-ranked Bradley and won the tournament, 71–68, to score the only Grand Slam in the history of college basketball. Irwin Dambrot of CCNY was named the tournament's Most Outstanding Player, and Nat Holman appeared on The Ed Sullivan Show. CCNY's victory was voted the most exciting event in the history of college basketball at Madison Square Garden.

== Follow-up commentary ==
The championship games of the NCAA tournament and the NIT were played at Madison Square Garden. The NCAA later ruled that no team could compete in both tournaments, to avoid having another double champion.

In 1950, CCNY was implicated in a point-shaving scandal. The players had taken money from gamblers in the point-shaving scandals during the 1948–1949 season and also during some regular-season games in the 1949–1950 season. No games were fixed during the post-season tournaments. This sent shock waves throughout college basketball. The scandal prompted the suspension of the basketball program. The school was moved from Division I to Division III and was banned from playing at Madison Square Garden. As a result of these sanctions, the CCNY basketball program was de–emphasized, and the school has never again appeared in either the NCAA or NIT tournaments. CCNY is the only NCAA Basketball Championship team that is no longer a member of Division I. Every one of the C.C.N.Y. players involved in the scandal eventually went back to school to earn his degree. Ed Warner and Alvin Roth played professionally in the Continental Basketball Association.

The NCAA tournament did not have another game at any Madison Square Garden facility from the 1961 tournament until 2014, when its successor, Madison Square Garden IV, hosted the East Regional Finals. This might be related to the point-shaving scandal of 1951 and the existence of gamblers in New York City. In 1996, the Final Four was held outside of New York City at the Continental Airlines Arena in East Rutherford, New Jersey. After a hiatus of more than half a century, the Big Dance finally returned to the most famous indoor arena in the United States.

Nat Holman stayed on as CCNY coach until 1959, and the school's arena was named the Nat Holman Gymnasium. Holman was 98 years old when he died at the Hebrew Home for the Aged in the Riverdale section of the Bronx, NY, in 1995.

== Roster ==
1949–50 CCNY Beavers men's basketball team
Players
Coaches

Pos.	#	Name	Height	Weight	Year	Previous school	Hometown
C		Ed Roman	6 ft 6 in (1.98 m)	—	So	William Howard Taft HS
PF		Ed Warner	6 ft 4 in (1.93 m)	—	So	DeWitt Clinton HS
SF		Irwin Dambrot	6 ft 4 in (1.93 m)	175 lb (79 kg)	Sr	William Howard Taft HS
SG		Floyd Layne	6 ft 3 in (1.91 m)	—	So	Benjamin Franklin HS
PG		Alvin Roth	6 ft 3 in (1.91 m)	—	So	Erasmus HS
SG		Herb Cohen	6 ft 1 in (1.85 m)	—	So	Erasmus HS
PF		Norm Mager	6 ft 5 in (1.96 m)	185 lb (84 kg)	Sr	Lafayette HS
PG		Ron Nadell	5 ft 11 in (1.8 m)	—	Jr
PG		Mike Wittlin	5 ft 10 in (1.78 m)	—	Sr
C		Joe Galiber	6 ft 4 in (1.93 m)	—	Sr
C		Leroy Watkins	6 ft 7 in (2.01 m)	—
		Arnold Smith	—	—
		Seymour Levy	—	—
		Larry Meyer	—	—
		Arthur Glass	—	—
F		Charles Macellaro	6 ft 2 in (1.88 m)	185 lb (84 kg)

Head coach

- Nat Holman (NYU)

Assistant coach(es)

- Bobby Sand

Legend

- (C) Team captain
- (S) Suspended
- (I) Ineligible
- (W) Walk-on
- Injured
- Current redshirt

== Profile of the players ==
Irwin Dambrot was a 6-foot-4, 175-pound All-American forward and the only senior in the starting lineup. His free-throw defeated Ohio State 56–55 in the opening round of the NCAA tournament. He also made a game-saving play at the end of the title game against Bradley to earn MVP honors. After the scandal broke, he pleaded guilty to conspiracy charges, ended his basketball career, and enrolled at Columbia University Dental School. He served in the U.S. Air Force Dental Corps and then practiced dentistry in Forest Hills, Queens and Manhattan. In 1989, Dambrot went to Kansas City for the 50th anniversary of the NCAA tournament, when all previous MVPs were invited; he met a lot of coaches and was treated royally. In December 2009, a month before his death, Dambrot was on hand in a wheelchair at Madison Square Garden when the Garden cited the double championship as the No. 1 college basketball moment in the game's 75-year history there. The extended Dambrot family remained involved in the sport as his nephew Keith gained renown as a coach in the Midwest, both collegiately at Akron and Duquesne as well as at the high school level where his Akron St. Vincent-St. Mary's team won multiple titles led by a player he had coached since childhood named LeBron James. He had been living in Mendham, N.J. and died of Parkinson's disease at age 81 on January 21, 2010, and was interred at Locust Hill Cemetery in Dover, New Jersey.

Norm Mager was a 6-foot-5 senior and the top reserve on the team. He joined the Baltimore Bullets after graduating from CCNY, but his professional basketball career ended when the scandal broke. He became an executive with a janitorial supply company, Perfect Building Maintenance, and retired in 2000 as its president. In 2005, Mager died of cancer at age 78 at a hospital in Boynton Beach, Florida.

Ed Roman, the team's 6-foot-6-inch center, pleaded guilty to charges of conspiring to fix the outcome of games at Madison Square Garden. After serving two years in the Army, Roman earned his undergraduate degree in physical education at Seattle University. He returned to New York to do work at City College and New York University toward a master's degree and a doctorate in psychology. He worked in the city public school's system in Queens. Ed Roman died of leukemia at age 57 in 1988 at the Westchester Medical Center in Valhalla, N.Y.

Ed Warner also pleaded guilty to conspiracy charges. He was the only one of the players to go to jail for his crimes when he was sentenced to six months at Rikers Island. He received a prison sentence because he had a record as a juvenile delinquent and was incorrigible and uncontrollable in the courtroom. In the 1960s, he was imprisoned again after pleading guilty to attempting to sell heroin. Warner had worked as a high school basketball referee, but in April 1984 he was partly paralyzed when his automobile was struck from behind in Upper Manhattan. Ed Warner died in Harlem at age 73 in 2002.

Floyd Layne became basketball coach at CCNY in the 1970s and 1980s. After he left CCNY, he became the head basketball coach at Prospect Heights High School in Brooklyn.

Alvin Roth was 6'4", weighed 210 pounds and played guard. He was one of the players arrested in the scandal and agreed to serve in the United States Army for a time in exchange for suspending his jail sentence. After discharge, Roth finished City College business school and became an insurance executive in Westchester County, New York.

Leroy Watkins was a 6-foot-7-inch reserve center who was not involved in the scandal, because he had very little playing time. Nat Holman put Watkins in to jump-center for the opening tipoff against Kentucky in the NIT, and he surprisingly outjumped 7-foot Bill Spivey. Watkins died in 2008.

Joe Galiber, a substitute player who was not involved in point-shaving, became a state senator and served in this capacity until his death at age 71 in 1995.

== Schedule and results ==
Date time, TV	Rank^{#}	Opponent^{#}	Result	Record	High points	High rebounds	High assists	Site city, state
Regular Season
November 26, 1949*		Queens College	W 91–45	1–0	16 – Roman	–	–	
December 3, 1949*		Lafayette College	W 76–44	2–0	18 – Roman	–	–	Madison Square Garden; New York City, New York
December 8, 1949*		SMU	W 76–53	3–0	18 – Warner	–	–	Madison Square Garden; New York City, New York
December 10, 1949*		Kings Point	W 82–28	4–0	19 – Roman	–	–	
December 15, 1949		Brooklyn College	W 71–44	5–0 (1–0)	13 – Warner	–	–	Madison Square Garden; New York City, New York
December 19, 1949*		Oklahoma	L 63–67	5–1	20 – Roman	–	–	Madison Square Garden; New York City, New York
December 22, 1949*		California	W 76–46	6–1	17 – Roman	–	–	Madison Square Garden; New York City, New York
December 27, 1949*		UCLA	L 53–60	6–2	22 – Roman	–	–	Madison Square Garden; New York City, New York
January 3, 1950		St. John's	W 54–52	7–2 (2–0)	23 – Roman	–	–	Madison Square Garden; New York City, New York
January 7, 1950*	No. 14	Loyola-Chicago	W 61–46	8–2	14 – Cohen	–	–	Madison Square Garden; New York City, New York
January 10, 1950*	No. 7	West Virginia	W 80–55	9–2	22 – Roman	–	–	Madison Square Garden; New York City, New York
January 28, 1950*	No. 8	at Muhlenberg College	W 95–76	10–2	27 – Roman	–	–	
February 2, 1950*	No. 10	at Boston College	W 64–56	11–2	18 – Roman	–	–	
February 4, 1950*	No. 10	at Princeton	W 56–46	12–2	13 – Roman	–	–	
February 8, 1950	No. 14	at St. Francis Brooklyn	W 68–46	13–2 (3–0)	21 – Roman	–	–	II Corps Artillery Armory; Brooklyn, NY
February 11, 1950*	No. 14	at Canisius	L 49–53	13–3	15 – Roman	–	–	
February 16, 1950*	No. 13	Niagara University	L 61–68	13–4	23 – Roman	–	–	Madison Square Garden; New York City, New York
February 18, 1950*	No. 13	at St. Joseph's College	W 75–59	14–4	16 – Roman	–	–	
February 20, 1950	No. 20	at Fordham	W 66–62	15–4 (4–0)	16 – Warner	–	–	
February 23, 1950*	No. 20	Syracuse	L 74–83	15–5	23 – Roman	–	–	Madison Square Garden; New York City, New York
March 2, 1950		Manhattan College	W 57–55	16–5 (5–0)	15 – Warner	–	–	Madison Square Garden; New York City, New York
March 7, 1950		NYU	W 64–61	17–5 (6–0)	26 – Warner	–	–	Madison Square Garden; New York City, New York
National Invitation Tournament
March 11, 1950*		vs. San Francisco; First round	W 65–46	18–5	26 – Warner	–	–	Madison Square Garden; New York City, New York
March 14, 1950*		vs. Kentucky; Quarterfinals	W 89–50	19–5	26 – Warner	–	–	Madison Square Garden; New York City, New York
March 16, 1950*		vs. Duquesne; Semifinals	W 62–52	20–5	19 – Warner	–	–	Madison Square Garden; New York City, New York
March 18, 1950*		vs. No. 1 Bradley; Championship Game	W 69–61	21–5	23 – Dambrot	–	–	Madison Square Garden; New York City, New York
NCAA tournament
March 23, 1950*		vs. Ohio State; Quarterfinals	W 56–55	22–5	17 – Layne	–	–	Madison Square Garden; New York City, New York
March 25, 1950*		vs. NC State; Semifinals	W 78–73	23–5	21 – Roman	–	–	Madison Square Garden; New York City, New York
March 28, 1950*		vs. No. 1 Bradley; Championship Game	W 71–68	24–5	15 – Dambrot	–	–	Madison Square Garden; New York City, New York
*Non-conference game. ^{#}Rankings from AP Poll. (#) Tournament seedings in parentheses. All times are in Eastern Time..

== Awards and honors ==
- Irwin Dambrot – NCAA basketball tournament Most Outstanding Player
- Ed Warner – National Invitation Tournament MVP
