= Ed Roman =

American basketball player

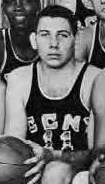
- Roman with the CCNY Beavers, c. 1950

Personal information
- Born: June 2, 1930
- Died: March 1, 1988 (aged 57) Valhalla, New York, U.S.
- Listed height: 6 ft 6 in (1.98 m)
- Listed weight: 220 lb (100 kg)

Career information
- High school: Taft (Bronx, New York)
- College: CCNY (1949–1951)
- Playing career: 1954–1961
- Position: Center
- Coaching career: 1960–1961

Career history

Playing
- 1954–1959: Scranton Miners
- 1959–1960: Baltimore Bullets
- 1960–1961: Williamsport Billies

Coaching
- 1960–1961: Williamsport Billies

Career highlights
- EPBL champion (1957); 2× All-EPBL First Team (1956, 1957); 2× All-EPBL Second Team (1955, 1959); NCAA champion (1950); NIT champion (1950)

Edward Roman (June 2, 1930 – March 1, 1988) was an American professional basketball player. He was the leading scorer of the 1949–50 CCNY Beavers men's basketball team, the only team to win both the NCAA tournament and the National Invitation Tournament (NIT) in the same year. He was also a central figure in the point shaving scandal that came to light in the aftermath of that season.

== College career ==
Roman, a 6'6" center, followed his Taft High School teammate Irwin Dambrot to play college basketball for Nat Holman at the City College of New York. Roman was part of a strong 1948 recruiting class for the Beavers. Roman, forward Ed Warner, point guard Alvin Roth and shooting guard Floyd Layne would comprise four-fifths of the starting lineup for CCNY's double championship squad in their first year of eligibility. Roman led the team in scoring that year at 16.4 points per game and was named to the All-tournament team for the 1950 NCAA Tournament.

== Point shaving scandal ==
The next season, junior Roman and teammate Ed Warner were named co-captains for the Beavers and were poised to defend their championship titles. However, on February 18, 1951, New York City District Attorney Frank Hogan arrested seven Beavers for shaving points in three games during the championship season, including Ed Roman. Roman was sentenced to six months in prison but received a suspended sentence.

For his involvement in fixing games, Ed Roman was banned for life from the National Basketball Association. The City College of New York would deemphasize athletics as a result of the scandal.

== Professional playing career ==
Roman played in the Eastern Professional Basketball League (EPBL) for the Scranton Miners, Baltimore Bullets and Williamsport Billies. He won an EPBL championship with the Miners in 1957. Roman was selected to the All-EPBL First Team in 1956 and 1957 and Second Team in 1955 and 1959. He served as head coach of the Billies during the 1960–61 season and accumulated an 11–16 record.

== Later life ==
After two years in the Army, Roman finished his studies (ultimately receiving a doctorate at New York University) and worked in the city public school system in Queens as a teacher of physical education and, after the mid-1970s, as a psychological consultant. He had three children: Mark, Joanne and Tammy. Ed Roman died on March 1, 1988, of leukemia.

== See also ==
- List of people banned or suspended by the NBA
