= Alvin Roth (basketball) =

American basketball player (1929–2003)

- Roth, c. 1950

Personal information
- Born: November 2, 1929
- Died: June 19, 2003 (aged 73) Rockland, New York
- Listed height: 6 ft 4 in (1.93 m)
- Listed weight: 210 lb (95 kg)

Career information
- High school: Erasmus (Brooklyn, New York)
- College: CCNY (1949–1951)
- NBA draft: 1951: undrafted
- Position: Guard

Career highlights
- NCAA champion (1950); NIT champion (1950)

Alvin "Fats" Roth (November 2, 1929 – June 19, 2003) was an American professional basketball player known for his playing days at the City College of New York (CCNY) between 1949–50 and 1950–51. Roth was a contributing member of the only basketball team in NCAA history to win both the National Invitation Tournament (NIT) and NCAA Tournament in the same season. Roth was one of four sophomore starters on the CCNY squad that defeated Bradley in both championship games.

== College career ==
Roth was 6'4", weighed 210 pounds and played guard. He grew up in Brooklyn, New York, and attended Erasmus Hall High School, where as a senior in 1947–48 he led them to a PSAL championship. Due to his poor academic grades, Roth was ineligible to attend CCNY his freshman year; one year later Roth was admitted to the school as a sophomore. It was this season that CCNY won both national basketball championships (the NIT was actually considered the premier national championship at the time). One year later, news broke about a point-shaving scandal that was sweeping east coast universities, and at its heart was CCNY's squad led by Nat Holman. Roth was one of the players arrested in the scandal. In July 1952, a judge suspended his sentence after Roth volunteered to join the United States Army as a private in the following month.

Roth's admission into CCNY despite his poor grades was a result of transcript altering by Holman. Nationally, all of the players who were convicted of participating in the scandal were banned from ever playing in the National Basketball Association (NBA).

== Professional career ==
=== Eastern Professional Basketball League ===
Due to his ban, Roth played for a time in the Eastern League, although it's currently unknown which team(s) he played for and for how long he played for said team(s) in question.

== Personal life ==
After his playing days, Roth went back to CCNY to earn his business degree, then moved to the suburbs of New York City to sell insurance. He died June 19, 2003, in Rockford, New York.

== See also ==
- List of people banned or suspended by the NBA
