= Irwin Dambrot =

American basketball player

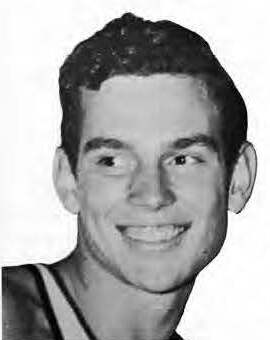
- Dambrot, c. 1950

Personal information
- Born: May 24, 1928 Bronx, New York, U.S.
- Died: January 21, 2010 (aged 81) Summit, New Jersey, U.S.
- Listed height: 6 ft 4 in (1.93 m)
- Listed weight: 175 lb (79 kg)

Career information
- High school: William Howard Taft (Bronx, New York)
- College: CCNY (1946–1950)
- NBA draft: 1950: 1st round, 7th overall pick
- Drafted by: New York Knicks
- Position: Forward

Career highlights
- NCAA champion (1950); NCAA Tournament Most Outstanding Player (1950); NIT champion (1950)
- Stats at Basketball Reference

Irwin Dambrot (May 24, 1928 – January 21, 2010) was an American basketball player, best known for his college career at the City College of New York.

== Early life ==
Dambrot was born in the Bronx and attended William Howard Taft High School in the South Bronx.

== Basketball career ==
Dambrot was a first-round draft pick of the New York Knicks and the Most Outstanding Player of the 1950 NCAA basketball tournament.

A 6-foot–4, 175–pound forward, He played for coach Nat Holman at the City College of New York (CCNY), where he was a senior captain in 1950 and led the Beavers to a 24–5 record and the NCAA basketball championship, earning MVP honors in the tournament. After the season, Dambrot was named to the Helms Athletic Foundation Basketball All-America team.

Dambrot's CCNY team also won the 1950 National Invitation Tournament (NIT), the only time that one school has won both the NCAA and NIT tournaments in the same season. Dambrot was the only senior starter on the CCNY roster that season.

A January 19, 2003, article in the New York Daily News described Dambrot as "a sharp-shooting forward known for his relentless enthusiasm."

Dambrot was selected in the first round (seventh overall) by the New York Knicks in the 1950 NBA draft, though he chose a career in dentistry after graduating from CCNY to go to the Columbia University College of Dental Medicine soon afterward.

On March 26, 1951, Dambrot and his CCNY teammates Ed Roman, Ed Warner, Norm Mager, Al "Fats" Roth, Herb Cohen, and Floyd Layne were arrested on charges of shaving points in three games during the 1949–50 season. They pleaded guilty to misdemeanor charges of point shaving. All received suspended sentences, except for Warner, who received a six-month prison sentence because he had a prior run-in with the law.

According to a March 20, 1996, article in the New York Times by Ira Berkow, "the CCNY players who were convicted had accepted bribes from gamblers not to throw games, but to keep them under the point spreads. The players received just a few thousand dollars for their efforts, which took place during the season, but not during tournament games."

Dambrot's nephew, Keith Dambrot, coached LeBron James when the future NBA star was at St. Vincent–St. Mary High School, and was a head basketball coach for both the University of Akron and Duquesne University.

== Later life and death ==
Irwin Dambrot lived his final years in Mendham, New Jersey. He died at age 81 at a hospital in Summit, New Jersey, after having suffered from Parkinson's disease for some time. He is interred at Locust Hill Cemetery in Dover, New Jersey.

== See also ==
- CCNY Point Shaving Scandal
- City Dump: The Story of the 1951 CCNY Basketball Scandal
- List of people banned or suspended by the NBA
