= Gene Melchiorre =

American basketball player (1927–2019)

Personal information
- Born: August 10, 1927 Highland Park, Illinois, U.S.
- Died: September 27, 2019 (aged 92) Highland Park, Illinois, U.S.
- Listed height: 5 ft 8 in (1.73 m)
- Listed weight: 175 lb (79 kg)

Career information
- High school: Highland Park (Highland Park, Illinois)
- College: Bradley (1947–1951)
- NBA draft: 1951: 1st round, 1st overall pick
- Drafted by: Baltimore Bullets
- Position: Point guard
- Number: 23

Career highlights
- Consensus first-team All-American (1951); Second-team All-American – UPI (1950); 3× First-team All-MVC (1949–1951)
- Stats at Basketball Reference

Eugene "Squeaky" Melchiorre (August 10, 1927 – September 27, 2019) was an American basketball player. A point guard, he was drafted by the Baltimore Bullets and was the first overall pick in the 1951 NBA draft. Melchiorre never played an NBA game due to his lifetime ban from the league for point shaving when he was a college player.

== Early life ==
He was the fifth of six children born in Highland Park, Illinois, to a gardener who moved his family there from Joliet in 1936. Though short in stature and having pigeon toes, Melchiorre excelled in nearly ever sport he tried. He was a starting wingback on the Highland Park football team, a basketball player, a baseball player, a tennis player and, in his later years, a golfer. After joining the Army, Melchiorre joined the basketball team at Fort Sheridan, known as the Ramblers, that won 58 out of 63 games during his two-year tour (1945–47).

== College career ==
After playing in the U.S. Army together, Melchiorre and Bill Mann had become close friends and were recruited together by numerous colleges. They decided to attend Bradley University together, with their tuition being covered by the. GI Bill.

Melchiorre played guard for Bradley in the 1947–48 to 1950–51 seasons. Standing only 5 feet 8 inches (1.73 m)and weighing 175 pounds (79 kg), he was famous for his passing abilities and his ability to score. During his tenure, Bradley won 119 games while losing only 22. He participated in both the NIT and NCAA tournament in 1950, in which Bradley lost to CCNY in the championship game of each tournament.

In 1947–1948, playing for Coach Alfred J. Robertson, Melchiorre was Bradley's 2nd leading scorer as a freshman (9.8 points, 3.7 assists), as the Braves finished 28–3.

As a sophomore, Melchiorre averaged 11.8 points under Coach Forddy Anderson as Bradley finished 27–8.

In 1949–1950, Bradley was 32–5, with Melchiorre averaging 11.9 points.

The Braves lost in the Final of the 1950 NCAA basketball tournament 71–68 to City College of New York, as Melchiorre led all scorers with 16 points. In the Final, Melchiorre's basket put the Braves up by one with 30 seconds remaining. Bradley then got the ball back, with a chance to go up three (before the three point shot was in effect), but Melchiorre's breakaway layup was blocked by Irwin Dambrot. Dambrot then passed downcourt to Norm Mager, who hit the game-winning shot for the CCNY. Of the final play, "He definitely fouled me.' Melchiorre said. "There's no question about it, we should have won."

As a senior in 1950–1951, Melchiorre led Bradley to a 32–6 record, leading the team in scoring with a 10.2 average.

In his Bradley career, Melchiorre was named to the Missouri Valley Conference first team three times, and in his junior year made the all-NIT team. For the 1951 season, he was an Associated Press, United Press International and Colliers Magazine first team All-American and selected by the magazine, Sports Album, as one of the two best offensive players in the country.

Melchiorre was also a letter-winner on the Bradley baseball team, a member of Sigma Chi and received a degree in business administration.

=== Point shaving scandal ===
Melchiorre was involved in a massive point shaving scandal in 1951 which brought seven schools and 32 players from around the U.S. to face charges on violations of the New York state penal code.

On July 24, 1951, Melchiorre and four of his teammates admitted taking bribes to hold down scores against St. Joseph's University in Philadelphia in 1951 and against Oregon State University in Chicago.

Melchiorre and two of his teammates (Bill Mann and Mike Chinakas) pleaded guilty to a misdemeanor in New York State. Though the players faced three years in prison, the assistant District Attorney praised the trio's cooperation, and they were given suspended sentences.

== Professional career ==
After completion of his four years at Bradley and a suspended sentence for the point-shaving scandal, Melchiorre entered the 1951 NBA draft. He was selected as the first overall pick in the draft by the Baltimore Bullets. Melchiorre would never play a minute of NBA basketball, however as he was banned from the NBA for life due to his participation in the point-shaving scandal. Melchiorre was also planning to be a part of the 1952–53 Jersey City Titans team that also featured three other players implicated in the 1951 college basketball point-shaving scandal in former Indianapolis Olympians players Ralph Beard and Alex Groza and former Long Island University star forward Sherman White, but Jersey City would end up withdrawing from the (original) American Basketball League in what later became its final season of existence before it even began due to the Titans not wanting to remove the players that had been implicated in that scandal from that team. (Originally, the Elmira Colonels joined in with defecting the ABL due to them wanting to keep former University of Kentucky center Bill Spivey themselves, but they later returned in time for the ABL's updated season to begin, while the Titans only played in exhibition matches before folding operations entirely.)

== Personal ==
Melchiorre married Kay Boles in 1951.

He returned to his native Highland Park in the mid-1950s, at first working in the post office. He then moved into insurance and appliance sales, women's wear and finally started his own small trucking firm.

Melchiorre died on September 27, 2019, at the age of 92.

== Honors ==
- In 1975, Melchiorre was inducted into the Basketball Museum of Illinois/IBCA Hall of Fame.
- In 1979, Melchiorre was inducted into the Bradley University Athletics Hall of Fame.
- Melchiorre was inducted into the Chicagoland Sports Hall of Fame.
- The Greater Peoria Sports Hall of Fame inducted Melchiorre in 1996.
- In 2007, Melchiorre was selected to the Missouri Valley Conference All-Time Baseball Team at 2nd Base.
- In 2009, Bradley University refused to display Melchiorre's jersey alongside others.
- In 2012, Melchiorre was inducted into the Highland Park Sports Hall of Fame.

== See also ==
- NBA first overall draft pick
- List of people banned or suspended by the NBA
