= Jack Kaminer =

American former basketball coach

Playing career
- 1961–1963: LIU Brooklyn

Coaching career (HC unless noted)
- 1970–1974: CCNY

Head coaching record
- Overall: 36–44 (college)

Jack Kaminer is an American former basketball coach. He spent 32 years coaching at the high school and college levels before retiring in 1997 and was named a league coach of the year 14 times by varying organizations. Kaminer took over the City College of New York (CCNY) men's basketball program in February 1971 after head coach David Polansky resigned. In his four years as CCNY's coach he compiled a record of 36 wins and 44 losses. In the early 1960s he played for Long Island University on a basketball scholarship.

Kaminer also coached at Wingate High School, Franklin K. Lane High School, Truman High School, and Scarsdale High School. He was inducted into the New York State Basketball Hall of Fame in 2002.

== Head coaching record ==
=== College ===
Record table
Season	Team	Overall	Conference	Standing	Postseason
CCNY Beavers (Independent) (1970–1974)
1970–71	CCNY	3–5			
1971–72	CCNY	14–9			
1972–73	CCNY	10–16			
1973–74	CCNY	9–14			
Total:		36–44 (.450)			
