= Norm Mager =

American basketball player (1926–2005)

Personal information
- Born: March 23, 1926 Brooklyn, New York, U.S.
- Died: March 17, 2005 (aged 78) Boynton Beach, Florida, U.S.
- Listed height: 6 ft 5 in (1.96 m)
- Listed weight: 185 lb (84 kg)

Career information
- High school: Lafayette (Brooklyn, New York)
- College: CCNY (1947–1950)
- NBA draft: 1950: 5th round
- Drafted by: Baltimore Bullets
- Position: Forward
- Number: 33

Career history
- 1950–1951: Baltimore Bullets

Career highlights
- NCAA champion (1950); NIT champion (1950)
- Stats at NBA.com
- Stats at Basketball Reference

Norman Clifford Mager (March 23, 1926 – March 17, 2005) was an American professional basketball player who played in the National Basketball Association for the Baltimore Bullets during the 1950–51 NBA season. Mager is also notable as a key member of the 1949–50 CCNY Beavers men's basketball team, the only team in NCAA history to win both the National Invitation Tournament and NCAA tournament in the same year.

== College career ==
Mager, a 6 ft 5 in (1.96 m) forward from Lafayette High School in Brooklyn, was a senior during the 1949–50 season. He averaged 3.6 points per game during the season, but had a strong postseason, averaging 12.6 points per game in the 1950 NCAA tournament and was named to the All-Eastern regional team. He was also important in the Beavers' NIT run, averaging 4.7 points per game.

== Professional career ==
=== Baltimore Bullets (1950-1951) ===
Following the close of his collegiate career, Mager was drafted in the fifth round of the 1950 NBA draft by the Baltimore Bullets. Mager played 22 games for the Bullets, averaging 4.6 points and 2.0 rebounds per game. However, his career came to a premature end in the wake of the CCNY Point Shaving Scandal, where it was revealed that players on the team had taken money to manipulate the point-spread of several games. Mager was thrown out of the NBA and other members of the CCNY team were banned for life from the league.

== Personal life ==
Mager became an executive with a janitorial supply company, retiring in 2000. He died of cancer on March 17, 2005, in Boynton Beach, Florida.

== Career statistics ==
Legend
GP	Games played	GS	Games started	MPG	Minutes per game
FG%	Field goal percentage	3P%	3-point field goal percentage	FT%	Free throw percentage
RPG	Rebounds per game	APG	Assists per game	SPG	Steals per game
BPG	Blocks per game	PPG	Points per game	**Bold**	Career high

=== NBA ===
==== Regular season ====
Year	Team	GP	FG%	FT%	RPG	APG	PPG
1950–51	Baltimore	24	.282	.786	2.0	1.0	5.2

== See also ==
- List of people banned or suspended by the NBA
