= 1949–50 Bradley Braves men's basketball team =

American college basketball season

1949–50 Bradley Braves men's basketball
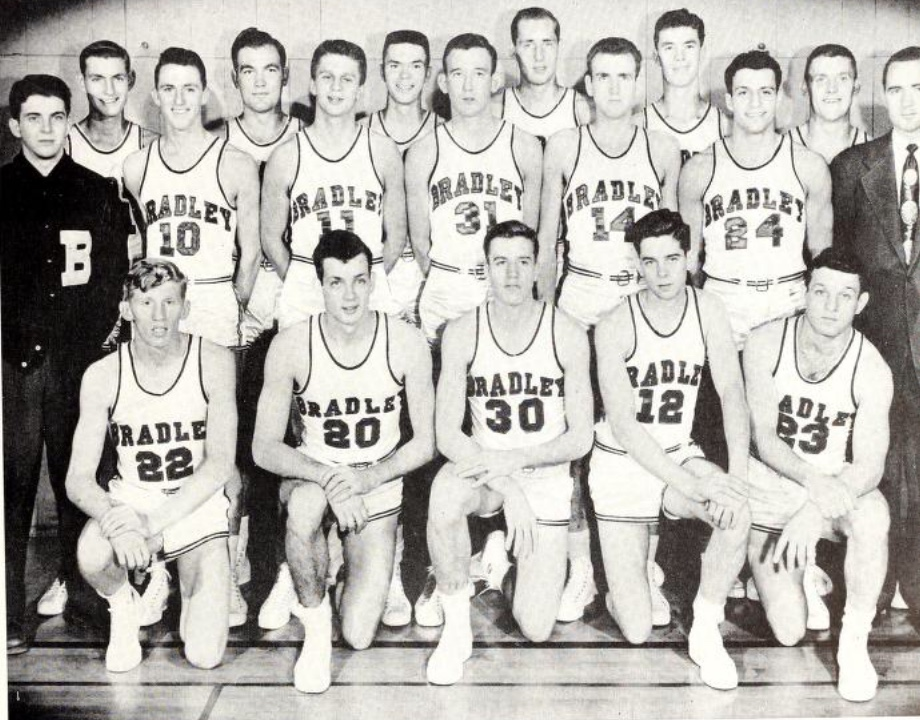

NCAA Tournament Runner-up NIT Runner-up Missouri Valley Conference champions NCAA men's basketball regular season champions

National Championship Game, L 68–71 vs. CCNY
- Conference: Missouri Valley Conference

Ranking
- AP: No. 1
- Record: 32–5 (11–1 MVC)
- Head coach: Forddy Anderson (2nd season)
- Captain: Billy Mann
- Home arena: Robertson Memorial Field House

1949–50 Missouri Valley Conference men's basketball standings
	Conf.				Overall
Team	W		L	PCT	W		L	PCT
No. 1 Bradley	11	–	1	.917	32	–	5	.865
Saint Louis	8	–	4	.667	17	–	9	.654
Detroit	7	–	5	.583	20	–	6	.769
Oklahoma A&M	7	–	5	.583	18	–	9	.667
Drake	5	–	7	.417	14	–	12	.538
Tulsa	3	–	9	.250	12	–	11	.522
Wichita Municipal	1	–	11	.083	7	–	17	.292
Rankings from AP Poll

The 1949–50 Bradley Braves men's basketball team represented Bradley University in college basketball during the 1949–50 season. The team finished the season with a 32–5 record and were national runners-up to the City College of New York (CCNY) in both the 1950 NCAA tournament and 1950 National Invitation Tournament. Early on in the NCAA Tournament's days, which began in 1939, teams were allowed to participate in both it and the NIT. The 1949–50 college basketball season is noteworthy in that it is the only year in which a team won both tournaments (CCNY), and the losing team of both championships happened to be Bradley. Coincidentally enough, a year later, several of Bradley's players from this season's team would be instigated as individuals involved in what would later be known as the 1951 college basketball point-shaving scandal.

== Schedule and results ==
Date time, TV	Rank^{#}	Opponent^{#}	Result	Record	Site city, state
Regular season
12/6/1949*		Houston	W 73–57	1–0	Robertson Memorial Field House; Peoria, IL
12/8/1949*		Iowa State	W 56–48	2–0	Robertson Memorial Field House; Peoria, IL
12/12/1949*		Nebraska	W 64–54	3–0	Robertson Memorial Field House; Peoria, IL
12/15/1949*		TCU	W 85–49	4–0	Robertson Memorial Field House; Peoria, IL
12/17/1949*		Purdue	L 65–71	4–1	Robertson Memorial Field House; Peoria, IL
12/19/1949*		Georgia Tech	W 84–60	5–1	Robertson Memorial Field House; Peoria, IL
12/21/1949*		Washington State	W 67–59	6–1	Robertson Memorial Field House; Peoria, IL
12/23/1949*		Fresno State	W 83–51	7–1	Robertson Memorial Field House; Peoria, IL
12/27/1949*		DePaul	W 68–65	8–1	Robertson Memorial Field House; Peoria, IL
12/29/1949*		at Tulane; Sugar Bowl Tournament	W 72–46	9–1	Devlin Fieldhouse; New Orleans, LA
12/30/1949*		vs. Kentucky; Sugar Bowl Tournament Championship	L 66–71	9–2	Devlin Fieldhouse; New Orleans, LA
1/2/1950*		Ohio State	W 65–46	10–2	Robertson Memorial Field House; Peoria, IL
1/7/1950	No. 3	at Drake	W 72–57	11–2 (1–0)	Drake Fieldhouse; Des Moines, IA
1/9/1950*	No. 3	Georgetown College	W 79–39	12–2	Robertson Memorial Field House; Peoria, IL
1/12/1950*	No. 6	at Manhattan	W 89–67	13–2	Madison Square Garden; Manhattan, NY
1/14/1950*	No. 6	at Saint Joseph's	W 64–60	14–2	Alumni Memorial Fieldhouse; Philadelphia, PA
1/16/1950	No. 6	Detroit	W 71–50	15–2 (2–0)	Robertson Memorial Field House; Peoria, IL
1/21/1950	No. 4	at Detroit	L 54–67	15–3 (2–1)	Detroit Naval Armory; Detroit, MI
1/26/1950	No. 6	Tulsa	W 64–45	16–3 (3–1)	Robertson Memorial Field House; Peoria, IL
1/28/1950	No. 6	at Saint Louis	W 54–45	17–3 (4–1)	Kiel Auditorium; St. Louis, MO
2/4/1950*	No. 3	Pittsburgh	W 84–48	18–3	Robertson Memorial Field House; Peoria, IL
2/6/1950	No. 3	Wichita State	W 61–49	19–3 (5–1)	Robertson Memorial Field House; Peoria, IL
2/9/1950*	No. 2	Hawaii	W 77–53	20–3	Robertson Memorial Field House; Peoria, IL
2/11/1950*	No. 2	at DePaul	W 67–56	21–3	University Auditorium; Chicago, IL
2/13/1950	No. 2	Oklahoma State	W 59–46	22–3 (6–1)	Robertson Memorial Field House; Peoria, IL
2/18/1950	No. 2	at Wichita State	W 68–56	23–3 (7–1)	Henrion Hall; Wichita, KS
2/20/1950	No. 2	No. 18 Saint Louis	W 52–45	24–3 (8–1)	Robertson Memorial Field House; Peoria, IL
2/25/1950	No. 1	at Oklahoma State	W 42–35	25–3 (9–1)	Gallagher-Iba Arena; Stillwater, OK
2/27/1950	No. 1	at Tulsa	W 57–56	26–3 (10–1)	Expo Square Pavilion; Tulsa, OK
3/4/1950	No. 1	Drake	W 92–63	27–3 (11–1)	Robertson Memorial Field House; Peoria, IL
1950 National Invitation Tournament
3/13/1950*	No. 1	vs. Syracuse; NIT Quarterfinals	W 78–66	28–3	Madison Square Garden; New York, NY
3/16/1950*	No. 1	vs. No. 9 St. John's; NIT Semifinals	W 83–72	29–3	Madison Square Garden; New York, NY
3/18/1950*	No. 1	vs. CCNY; NIT Championship	L 61–69	29–4	Madison Square Garden; New York, NY
1950 NCAA Tournament
3/20/1950*	No. 1	vs. No. 19 Kansas; NCAA First Round	W 59–57	30–4	Municipal Auditorium; Kansas City, MO
3/24/1950*	No. 1	vs. No. 7 UCLA; NCAA Quarterfinals	W 73–59	31–4	Municipal Auditorium; Kansas City, MO
3/25/1950*	No. 1	vs. Baylor; NCAA Final Four	W 68–66	32–4	Municipal Auditorium; Kansas City, MO
3/28/1950*	No. 1	vs. CCNY; NCAA National Championship	L 68–71	32–5	Madison Square Garden; New York, NY
*Non-conference game. ^{#}Rankings from AP Poll. (#) Tournament seedings in parentheses.
