= Michael Jay =

Michael Jay may refer to:

- Michael Jay, Baron Jay of Ewelme, British politician and diplomat
- Michael Jay (producer), American songwriter, record producer and studio owner

== See also ==
- Mike Jay, American football quarterback
