= 1941–42 Baylor Bears basketball team =

American college basketball season

1941–42 Baylor Bears men's basketball
- Conference: Southwest Conference
- Record: 11-9 (6-6 SWC)
- Head coach: Bill Henderson

1941–42 Southwest Conference men's basketball standings
	Conf.				Overall
Team	W		L	PCT	W		L	PCT
Arkansas	10	–	2	.833	19	–	4	.826
Rice	10	–	2	.833	22	–	5	.815
TCU	6	–	6	.500	13	–	10	.565
Baylor	6	–	6	.500	11	–	9	.550
Texas	5	–	7	.417	14	–	9	.609
Texas A&M	4	–	8	.333	8	–	16	.333
SMU	1	–	11	.083	3	–	16	.158

The 1941-42 Baylor Bears basketball team represented the Baylor University during the 1941-42 college men's basketball season.

== Schedule ==
Date time, TV	Opponent	Result	Record	Site city, state
*	Southwest Texas	W 40-39	1-0	Waco, TX
*	North Texas	W 53-44	2-0	Waco, TX
*	Phillips 66	L 35-44	2-1	Waco, TX
*	Colorado St.-Greeley	W 64-44	3-1	Oklahoma City, OK
*	Southeastern Oklahoma St.	W 53-38	4-1	Oklahoma City, OK
*	Oklahoma A&M	L 29-40	4-2	Oklahoma City, OK
*	Texas Tech	W 59-58	5-2	Oklahoma City, OK
*	Phillips 66	L 32-71	5-3	Waco, TX
	TCU	W 44-32	6-3	Waco, TX
	at SMU	W 45-41	7-3	Dallas, TX
	at Texas A&M	W 48-46	8-3	College Station, TX
	at Texas	L 38-58	8-4	Austin, TX
	at Rice	L 36-73	8-5	Houston, TX
	Texas A&M	W 38-35	9-5	Waco, TX
	Arkansas	L 43-53	9-6	Waco, TX
	Arkansas	L 45-50	9-7	Waco, TX
	Texas	W 55-34	10-7	Waco, TX
	at TCU	L 33-37	10-8	Fort Worth, TX
	Rice	L 38-63	10-9	Waco, TX
	SMU	W 46-39	11-9	Waco, TX
*Non-conference game. (#) Tournament seedings in parentheses.
