= Public Schools Athletic League =

Athletics organization in New York city

- Abbreviation: PSAL
- Founded: 1903; 123 years ago
- Founder: Luther Halsey Gulick
- Purpose: Fitness education
- Region served: New York City, U.S.
- Services: Athletic competition for New York City
- Website: psal.org

The Public Schools Athletic League, known by the abbreviation PSAL, is an organization that promotes student athletics in the public schools of New York City. It was founded in 1903 to provide and maintain a sports program for students enrolled in New York City public schools. It is the oldest and largest sports league in the United States. The PSAL serves both boys and girls. The PSAL holds competitions in a wide range of indoor and outdoor sports in fall, winter and spring seasons. In 2007, the league included 185 schools involving nearly 2,400 teams.

During the 2014–15 school year, the PSAL distributed approximately $27 million to fund over 45,000 student-athletes at hundreds of New York City schools.

== Early history ==
The genesis of the Public Schools Athletic League (PSAL) came from the appointment in early 1903 of Luther Halsey Gulick as director of physical training for the New York public school system. Compared to other major cities, the athletics program for the New York boroughs were backwards, underdeveloped, and rife with corruption. Gulick found "semi-truant" boys playing baseball for schools they did not attend, and that there was much unsportsmanlike conduct and dishonesty on the playing fields. Only a small percentage of actual students participated in athletics. He saw a serious need for reform and devised a grandiose plan to form a new league—the PSAL—that would involve most of the student population, grade school and high school, and working with two influential New Yorkers—General George W. Wingate (a member of the City Board of Education) and James E. Sullivan (secretary of the Amateur Athletic Union)—presented it in October 1903 to the superintendent of schools, William H. Maxwell. He, with the concurrence of the school board, approved of Gulick's plan.

Although the PSAL received sanction by the board of education, it was set up as a private corporation that would not receive public tax money. The founders of the league recruited the businessmen of New York City to serve on the league's board of directors and also become paying members of the league, and also solicited contributions from prominent benefactors. The league was organized into 22 districts (expanded to 25 by 1910), in which each district league administered athletic programs for elementary and high schools within their district. One member of each district league served on the Elementary Games committee and one member of each district league served on the High School Games committee. These committees governed all general matters pertaining to the league. Championships were held at the district, borough, and city levels. By 1914, the Board of Education was fully funding the PSAL.

The league began with an athletic extravaganza held at Madison Square Garden on December 26, 1903. It involved 1,040 boys, mostly elementary school students, in basketball and track and field events. Among the high schools, Commerce won the track and field meet and Flushing won the basketball tournament. In the spring, the league held its first outdoor high school track and field championship, won by Brooklyn Boys. Each year thereafter the high school league expanded by adding citywide championships in additional sports. In the school year of 1906–07, cross country and soccer was added, and the 1907–08 school year saw the addition of rifle marksmanship, swimming, tennis, and baseball. The expanded activity of the PSAL served to kill off all the previous leagues by 1908.

Rowing was added in the spring of 1907, and several schools, mainly Commerce and Clinton, competed each Memorial Day in the Harlem Regatta. The schools had difficulty getting the use of shells, however, and in 1915 the PSAL withdrew sponsorship. In the 1909–10, lacrosse was added and, after World War I, golf, handball, fall rifle marksmanship, and ice hockey were added.

Football was not a part of the league's program in its early years. The PSAL chose not to sponsor football, because the intent of the league was to involve the average athlete in athletics, and football was considered a sport for athletic elites. The Long Island, Metropolitan, and various borough leagues continued to run the football championships for a couple or so years. In the fall of 1905, the New York newspapers began crowning schools with the titular "Greater New York" championship in football. This procedure lasted until about the fall of 1913, when the number of football contenders made it impossible to schedule sufficient games to decide on one champion. Finally, the PSAL began sponsoring football competition by boroughs in the fall of 1919, but no official championships were recognized. The newspapers crowned the borough champions in football.

The premier athletic powers in the league were spread over the boroughs and in the different sports. In the Bronx one of the premier powers was DeWitt Clinton, which took more than its share of trophies in the basketball, swimming, track and field, tennis, and football. In Manhattan was Stuyvesant, which rivaled Clinton in basketball, swimming, and track and field, and Commerce, which rivaled Clinton in basketball and football. Townsend Harris produced more than its share of swimming championships. In Brooklyn, Manual Training succeeded Long Island League alumnus Brooklyn Boys' as the borough's power. Another Long Island League alumnus, Erasmus Hall, emerged as a football and swimming power. In the 1920s, New Utrecht take most of the indoor and outdoor titles.

Queens produced Jamaica (in ice hockey and rifle marksmanship), Richmond Hill (in golf), and Flushing (in cross country and track and field). Besides Clinton, the Bronx could boast of Morris, which dominated rifle marksmanship early on and took several national championships, and also did well in soccer and tennis. Evander Childs did well in golf, rifle, swimming, and tennis. On Staten Island (Richmond Borough), Curtis became a power in cross country, golf, and soccer.

In the late 1920s and early 1930s, new athletic powers came, such as Jefferson, Textile, Brooklyn Technical High School, Monroe, and Madison. Handball and fencing were added to the league program. The Great Depression of the 1930s cut somewhat into the PSAL program, and some sports were discontinued.

== Sports programs ==
The following is a list of the sports that the PSAL currently runs under its program.

=== Boys ===
Fall Sports

- Badminton
- Bowling (Co-Ed)
- Cross Country
- Fencing
- Football
- Soccer

Winter Sports

- Basketball
- Gymnastics
- Indoor Track
- Wrestling
- Swimming
- Table Tennis

Spring Sports

- Baseball
- Cricket (Co-Ed)
- Golf (Co-Ed)
- Handball
- Lacrosse
- Outdoor Track
- Tennis
- Volleyball

=== Girls ===
Fall Sports

- Bowling (Co-Ed)
- Cross Country
- Golf
- Tennis
- Soccer
- Swimming
- Volleyball
- Multiple Pathways League (MPL) Volleyball

Winter Sports

- Basketball
- Gymnastics
- Indoor Track
- Table Tennis
- MPL Table Tennis (Co-Ed)

Spring Sports

- Badminton
- Cricket (Co-Ed)
- Flag Football
- Rugby
- Fencing
- Golf (Co-Ed)
- Handball
- Lacrosse
- Outdoor Track
- Softball
- Wrestling
- Stunt

== Equitable access disputes ==
In August 2006, New York City Public Advocate Betsy Gotbaum released a report titled "Making the Team: Gender Inequality in New York City PSAL Sports Teams." The report stated "all types of high schools favored boys sport teams opportunities" and that "the PSAL sports schedule discriminated against girls." It also stated that several women's sports were scheduled during the "off-season" of that sport, while the men's counterparts played during the traditional season. The report alleged that the PSAL was in violation of Title IX of the Civil Rights Act of 1964. In 2009 the PSAL moved girls' soccer from the spring to the fall season, lining up with the boys' soccer season, after the threat of a lawsuit from the New York Civil Liberties Union on behalf of three athletes. In 2010, the National Women's Law Center filed a lawsuit with the Office for Civil Rights of the United States Department of Education, claiming that the NYCDOE provided inadequate opportunities for female high school sports compared to those for males. The complaint alleged many public high schools in the city did not offer any girls teams in several sports, a violation of Title IX. Other urban school districts involved in the suit included those of Chicago and Houston. In 2015, the ensuing federal investigation concluded that the NYCDOE violated Title IX by failing to provide an equal opportunity for female students to participate in sports.

In May 2014, the founder of the Small Schools Athletic League, David Garcia-Rosen, filed a civil rights complaint with the United States Department Of Education against the PSAL, alleging that they were in violation of Title XI of the Civil Rights Act of 1964. The complaint included dozens of charts that illustrated students who attend schools with the highest percentages of students of color had the fewest opportunities to participate in PSAL sports, while the schools with the most white students had as many as 44 PSAL teams. The New York Times called the PSAL's response to this complaint a "statistical delusion."

At a May 28, 2014, City Council budget hearing, 100 students wearing jerseys inside out presented Deputy Chancellor Grimm with thousands of petitions demanding equitable access to the PSAL for students of color.

In November 2014, Garcia-Rosen filed a second complaint with the US Department of Education's Office of Civil Rights alleging that the PSAL continued to violate Title XI of the Civil Rights Act of 1964 by not providing students of color with equitable access to a diverse range of PSAL sports teams.

On November 20, 2014, student-athlete Jason Puello sued the PSAL in New York State Supreme Court, alleging that the PSAL's age rules are "arbitrary and capricious."

== Notable PSAL alumni ==
Listed below are PSAL students who are/were involved in professional or college athletics.

Adali E. Stevenson High School

- Ed Pinckney (1981) – former NBA player, 1985 NCAA Champion

Bronx High School of Science Wolverines

- Arthur Bisguier (1947) – chess grandmaster
- Jeanette Lee (1989) – professional pool player, No. 1 ranked female pool player in the world
- Wolf Wigo (1991) – water polo player and coach, 2× NCAA champion
- Benjamin (Benji) Ungar (2004) – NCAA champion fencer

Christopher Columbus Explorers

- Izzy Molina (1990) – former MLB player for the Oakland Athletics and Baltimore Orioles
- Johnny Monell (2004) – former MLB player for the San Francisco Giants and New York Mets

DeWitt Clinton Governors

- Barney Sedran (1909) – former basketball player, Naismith Memorial Basketball Hall of Fame Member
- Fred DeStefano (1918) – former NFL player
- Tubby Raskin (1919) – former basketball player and coach of the Israel men's national basketball team
- George Gregory Jr. (1927) – played college basketball for Columbia University, first black basketball player to be selected as an All American
- George Kojac (1927) – swimmer, Olympic Gold Medalist
- Lou Bender (1928) – played college basketball for Columbia University, member of the New York City Basketball Hall of Fame
- Bernie Fliegel (1934) – professional basketball player, 1942 ABL Champion
- Eddie Lopat (1935) – former MLB player, 5× World Series Champion
- Ralph Kaplowitz (1937) – former NBA player
- Ben Auerbach (1937) – professional basketball player
- Sugar Ray Robinson (1938) – boxer, member of the International Boxing Hall of Fame
- Leo Gottlieb (1938) – former NBA player for the New York Knicks
- Dolph Schayes (1945) – former NBA player, Naismith Memorial Basketball Hall of Fame member
- Ed Warner (1948) – former college basketball player, banned by the NBA for his involvement in fixing games
- Ozzie Virgil Sr. (1950) – former MLB player, first Dominican to play in Major League Baseball
- Jerry Harkness (1959) – former NBA player, has the longest game winning shot in a professional basketball game
- Gary Gubner (1960) – professional weightlifter and shot-putter, Olympian
- Barry Leibowitz (1964) – former ABA and Israeli Basketball Premier League player
- Willie Worsley (1964) – former ABA player, 1966 NCAA Champion
- Nate Archibald (1966) – former NBA player, Naismith Memorial Basketball Hall of Fame Member
- Luther Green (1966) – former NBA player
- Tom Henderson (1969) – former NBA player, Olympic silver medalist
- Ricky Sobers (1971) – former NBA player, 1st Round Pick in 1975
- Steve Sheppard (1973) – former NBA player, Olympic Gold Medalist
- Butch Lee (1974) – former NBA player, first Puerto Rican player in NBA history
- Pedro Borbón Jr. (1985) – former MLB player, 1995 World Series Champion
- Sam Garnes (1992) – former NFL player and coach
- Sanjay Ayre (1999) – professional track athlete, Olympic Silver Medalist
- Ramon Guzman (2000) – former NFL and CFL player

Evander Childs Educational Campus

- Jack Shapiro (1925) – former NFL player, shortest player in NFL history

Harry Truman Mustangs

- Stan Jefferson (1980) – former MLB player, joined the NYPD after his MLB career
- Rod Strickland (1984) – former NBA player and current college coach

Herbert H. Lehman High School Lions

- Bobby Bonilla (1981) – former MLB player, 6× MLB All Star and 1997 World Series Champion
- Doug Marrone (1983) – former NFL player and current NFL coach
- T. J. Rivera (2006) – former MLB player, represented Puerto Rico at the World Baseball Classic

James Monroe High School

- Hank Greenberg (1929) – former MLB player, National Baseball Hall of Fame and Museum Member
- Izzy Goldstein (1930) – former MLB player for the Detroit Tigers
- Mickey Rutner (1937) – former MLB player for the Philadelphia Athletics
- Lennie Rosenbluth (1952) – former NBA player, 1957 NCAA Champion
- Ed Kranepool (1962) – former MLB player, 1× All Star and 1969 World Series Champion
- Dan Monzon (1964) – former MLB player for the Minnesota Twins
- Ellie Rodríguez (1966) – former MLB player, 2× All Star
- Wilbur Young (1967) – former NFL player
- Darren Carrington (1984) – former NFL player
- Malloy Nesmith Sr. (1988) – former professional basketball player in the Dominican Republic, street ball player

John F. Kennedy High School

- David Britton (1977) – former NBA player
- Miguel Jimenez (1987) – former MLB player for the Oakland Athletics
- Angel Estrada (2000) – former Arena Football League player
- Stephfon Green (2007) – former NFL player
- Dwight Hardy (2007) – former basketball player, played in Italy and Turkey
- Karamba Janneh (2007) – former soccer player

Morris High School

- Jack Coffey (1905) – former MLB player and college coach
- Bernard Opper (1935) – former NBL and ABL player, 2× ABL Champion
- Chris Eubank (1984) – boxer, former WBO Middleweight and super-middleweight champion

Theodore Roosevelt High School Rough Riders

- Rocky Colavito (dropped out in 1947) – former MLB player, 9× MLB All Star
- Ben Oglivie (1967) – former MLB player, 3× MLB All Star
- Sammy Mejía (2000) – former basketball player, Drafted by the Detroit Pistons in 2007

William Howard Taft High School

- Irwin Dambrot (1946) – former college basketball player, first round pick by the New York Knicks
- Ed Roman (1948) – former college basketball player, banned for life by the NBA
- Joe Hammond – former basketball player, drafted by the Los Angeles Lakers
- Artie Green (1979) – former basketball player, drafted by the Milwaukee Bucks
