= Ed Warner (basketball) =

American basketball player

- Warner, c. 1950

Personal information
- Born: July 5, 1929
- Died: September 7, 2002 (aged 73) Harlem, New York, U.S.
- Listed height: 6 ft 3 in (1.91 m)
- Listed weight: 190 lb (86 kg)

Career information
- High school: DeWitt Clinton (Bronx, New York)
- College: CCNY (1949–1951)
- Playing career: 1953–1961
- Position: Forward
- Number: 8

Career history
- 1953–1956: Hazleton Pros
- 1955–1956: Scranton Miners
- 1955–1956: Trenton Capitols / New York-Harlem Yankees
- 1956–1957: Easton Madisons
- 1957–1959: Wilkes-Barre Barons
- 1959–1960: Williamsport Billies
- 1960–1961: Wilkes-Barre Barons

Career highlights
- 2× EPBL champion (1958, 1959); NCAA champion (1950); NIT champion (1950); NIT MVP (1950)

Edward L. Warner (July 5, 1929 – September 7, 2002) was an American basketball player. He was one of the stars of the 1949–50 CCNY Beavers men's basketball team, the only team to win both the NCAA tournament and the National Invitation Tournament (NIT) in the same year. He was also a central figure in the point-shaving scandal that came to light in the aftermath of that season.

== College career ==
Warner came from DeWitt Clinton High School in the Bronx to play college basketball for Nat Holman at the City College of New York. A 6'3" forward, he regularly battled with bigger men to average 14.8 points per game as a sophomore for the Beavers during their championship year. In the 1950 NIT, he upped this average to 21.7 per game and was named the tournament's Most Valuable Player as CCNY defeated Bradley in the final at Madison Square Garden. A couple of weeks later, the Beavers again beat Bradley, this time in the 1950 NCAA tournament, to become the only team to win both tournaments in the same year.

== Point-shaving scandal ==
The next season, Warner and teammate Ed Roman were named co-captains for the Beavers and were poised to defend their championship titles. On February 18, 1951, New York City District Attorney Frank Hogan arrested seven men for point-shaving, including Warner. While most convicted players received suspended sentences, he was sent to prison for six months. A lawyer in the case remarked:

"(Judge Saul) Streit considered Warner to be incorrigible and uncontrollable. Warner was too flamboyant and he also had a record as a juvenile delinquent. Streit believed in rehabilitation by deprivation"

For his involvement in fixing games, Warner was permanently banned from playing in the National Basketball Association.

== Professional career ==
Warner played in the Eastern Professional Basketball League (EPBL) for the Hazleton Pros, Scranton Miners, Trenton Capitols / New York-Harlem Yankees, Easton Madisons, Wilkes-Barre Barons and Williamsport Billies from 1953 to 1961. He won EPBL championships with the Barons in 1958 and 1959.

== Later life, paralysis and death ==
In the 1960s, he was again imprisoned, for attempting to sell heroin. He then officiated high school basketball games until he was partly paralyzed in a 1984 car accident. He died on September 7, 2002.

== See also ==
- List of people banned or suspended by the NBA
