= Hiram Scott =

American fur trapper and trader

- Born: c. 1805; St. Charles County, Missouri, US
- Died: 1828 (aged 22–23); Scotts Bluff National Monument, Nebraska
- Occupations: Clerk, fur trade explorer
- Years active: 1822–1828
- Employer: Rocky Mountain Fur Company

Hiram Scott (c. 1805–1828) was an American mountain man, trapper, and pelt trader who trapped and took part in expeditions throughout the western United States during the 1820s. Born in Missouri, Scott joined the Rocky Mountain Fur Company in 1822 and took part in the first fur trade expedition at the Great Salt Lake in Utah. He died at age 23 near a cliff along the North Platte River in Nebraska which was named in his honor. The circumstances leading to his demise have given rise to many diverse accounts and theories.

== Early life and career ==
Hiram Scott was born in 1805 in St. Charles County, Missouri. Described as an abnormally towering and strapping figure with a dark complexion, in 1822 Scott was employed by William Henry Ashley and Andrew Henry's Rocky Mountain Fur Company, a pioneering enterprise which funded explorations into the western United States' wilderness. The company's Superintendent of Indian Affairs William Clark had granted Ashley and Henry a license to trade with Native Americans in Missouri, actively encouraging them to compete with the influential British fur trade in the Pacific Northwest. Scott was a member of the Rocky Mountain Fur Company's first expedition along the Missouri River between 1822 and 1823.

On June 2, 1823, Scott fought alongside fellow frontiersmen near the Missouri River who were attacked by warriors of the Arikara tribe. Fifteen trappers died during the raid; a war between the United States government and the Arikara broke out soon after. Until 1828, Scott, who served in the same capacity as a clerk, recorded transactions with Native Americans and led explorations from the Great Salt Lake frontier. He attended the first rendezvous at the fur trader post situated near Salt Lake in 1826 and participated in two other expeditions held there.

In 1827, Scott and James Bruffee were co-leaders of a caravan traveling to the Bear Lake rendezvous and returned with $20,000 (US) worth of pelts in October of the same year. Ashley sent the pair back to the same location a month later to trap more beaver. It was relayed that during an expedition in 1828 Scott and Bruffee engaged in a battle with Blackfoot Indians, creating speculation that the skirmish may have incapacitated Scott on his return journey to St. Louis; hence some accounts have attributed his eventual demise to Blackfoot Indians.

== Illness and death ==
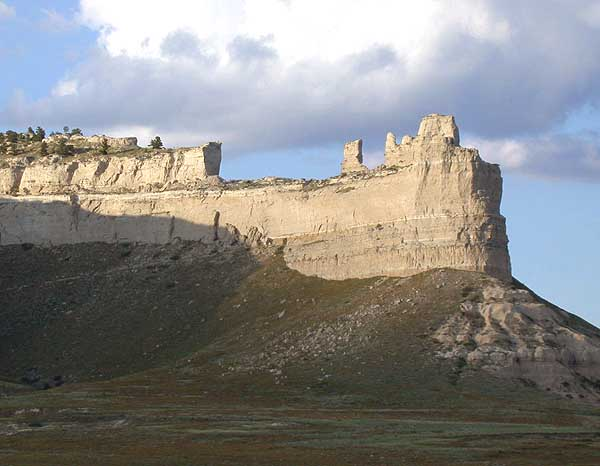
Saddle Rock formation in Scotts Bluff National Monument

Most likely, Scott contracted a severe illness on his eastward journey to St. Louis. Accompanied by two companions, he was transported in a bull boat on the North Platte River in hopes of reconnecting with a larger trading party. Along the way, their vessel overturned; the group's rifles and food supplies were lost.

According to Warren A. Ferris, the first person to record an account of Scott's death, his companions abandoned him on the north bank of the river. The following year, Scott's remains were discovered on the opposite side of the North Platte near the bluffs which now bear his name, implying he managed to make a crossing before his death.

A similar account of Scott succumbing to illness and being abandoned to die by his companions was recounted by trapper and fur explorer William Sublette in his diary; Sublette added that he returned to the site of the bluffs the following summer to collect and bury Scott's scattered bones. Variations to the event suggest Scott was deserted by his companions earlier along the route and he traversed miles of frontier before dying. Another take on the incident theorized, in an act of self-sacrifice, Scott insisted upon his expedition members to leave him behind, while others suspect foul play may have been involved.

== Legacy ==
Other sites named after Scott are Scotts Bluff County and the city of Scottsbluff, both in Nebraska; and the former Hiram Scott College in Scottsbluff.
