= Mike Jay =

American football player

Profile
- Position: Quarterback

Career information
- College: Texas A&M

Career history
- 1971: Hiram Scott College
- 1973–75: Texas A&M

Mike Jay is an American former football quarterback for Texas A&M University.

== Early life ==
Jay played high school football in Torrington, Wyoming, winning Honorable Mention High School Football All-America in 1969.

== College career ==
He began his college football career playing for the short-lived program of Hiram Scott College in Scottsbluff, Nebraska. The Scotties did not have a losing season during their brief existence (1966–71), but the program was shut down after the 1971 season when the school went bankrupt. Jay was the Scotties' starting quarterback during Hiram Scott's final season and led the team to a 6-2-1 record (including a win against Boise State) running an offense patterned after Oklahoma's. Following the season, the Scotties were selected to play in the Mineral Bowl, but were unable to accept the invitation. Wayne State University, a team that Hiram Scott had beaten that season, played in their place. Hiram Scott coach Dick Beechner called Jay one of the best players to ever play for Hiram Scott and said, "He was a good option quarterback and when he stepped into the huddle we knew the play he called probably going to be successful. He had that leadership ability."

After the Hiram Scott program was shut down, Jay found his way into the United States Marine Corps, where he played quarterback for the 1972 Quantico Marines, who finished the season with an 8–4 record. The team was eliminated following that season in the wake of defense budget cuts, as the Vietnam War waned.

Jay was recruited heavily in 1973, as he still had three remaining years of collegiate eligibility. In order to pursue his dreams to be a veterinarian, Jay transferred to Texas A&M. He led the team in passing his sophomore season with 682 yards while running Emory Bellard's wishbone offense and sharing starting duties with 17-year-old freshman phenom David Walker. He lost the starting job to Walker the following season only to regain it once again his senior year. He was the starting quarterback for the Aggies during his senior season in 1975 and led them to a season high national ranking of No. 2 (in the 12/1/75 AP poll), a 10-game winning streak including a 20-10 win against the rival No. 5 ranked Texas Longhorns, a Southwest Conference championship and a Liberty Bowl appearance against USC in Trojan coach John McKay's last game. After the season, Jay was voted by his teammates as the winner of the Aggie Heart Award. The Aggie Heart Award is presented to a senior who has completed his eligibility and displayed intangibles such as effort, desire, determination, competitiveness, leadership and courage. The Heart Award is voted on by the entire Aggie football team and is considered the highest award that a senior athlete can receive at Texas A&M. At last look, Jay still held a little-known record from per play yards from scrimmage of more than 10+, the only aggie in history to average double digit yards every time he touched the ball.

== Personal life ==
After football, Jay became a successful entrepreneur, business consultant, and author. He has two daughters.
