= Bill Henderson (coach) =

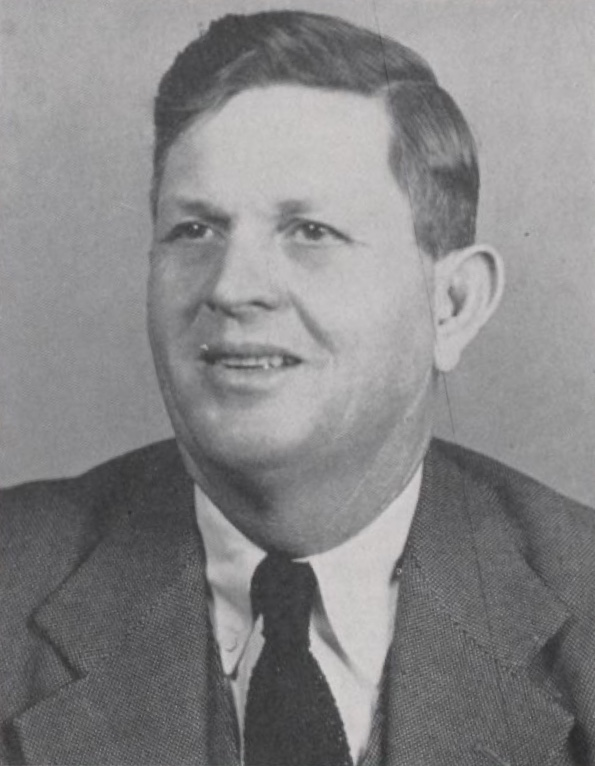
- Henderson from the 1950 Round-Up

Biographical details
- Born: 1901
- Died: July 5, 1979 (aged 78)

Coaching career (HC unless noted)
- 1941–1943: Baylor
- 1945–1961: Baylor

Administrative career (AD unless noted)
- 1968–1971: Baylor

Head coaching record
- Overall: 201–233
- Tournaments: 3–5 (NCAA)

Accomplishments and honors

Championships
- 4 SWC regular season (1946, 1948–1950)

R. E. "Bill" Henderson (1901 – July 5, 1979) was an American basketball coach. He was the head basketball coach at Baylor University from 1941 to 1943, and from 1945 to 1961. In his 18 seasons at Baylor, Henderson had a win–loss record of 201–233, and his teams made three NCAA tournament appearances.

Prior to becoming a college head coach, Henderson coached the Temple High School boys' basketball team, which reached the 1928 state championship game. Although Henderson's Temple team lost to Austin High School in the title game, it was eventually awarded the championship because an ineligible player had been on Austin's roster. In Henderson's first two seasons in charge of Baylor, the team finished with records of 11–9 and 6–14. After his two-season break, he guided the team to a 25–5 record, Southwest Conference championship, and NCAA tournament berth in 1945–46. In the 1948 NCAA tournament, the Bears reached the title game, rallying from sizable deficits against Washington and Kansas State along the way. Baylor faced Kentucky for the national championship, losing 58–42. It was the first time a Southwest Conference team had advanced to the championship game in an NCAA Tournament.

Henderson's team reached the Final Four of the 1950 NCAA tournament, losing to Bradley 68–66. The Bears did not return to the NCAA Tournament during Henderson's coaching tenure. The 1950 Final Four team only finished one game above .500 overall, and after that season he only notched two more winning records overall. The Bears declined to 4–20 in his final season, 1960–61. After the season, he announced his resignation. Henderson's total of 201 wins was a Baylor men's basketball record until current coach Scott Drew passed him in 2014. His 233 losses remains a school record.

Henderson has been noted for barring his players from smoking, drinking, and swearing, and for what author Allan Zullo called his "nervous habit of tying and untying his shoes at critical points in a game so he wouldn't have to watch a play unfold." From 1968 to 1971, Henderson served as Baylor's athletic director. The Texas Sports Hall of Fame inducted him in 1976. On July 5, 1979, Henderson died at the age of 78.

== Head coaching record ==
Record table
Season	Team	Overall	Conference	Standing	Postseason
Baylor Bears (Southwest Conference) (1941–1943)
1941–42	Baylor	11–9	6–6	T–3rd	
1942–43	Baylor	6–14	3–9	7th	
Baylor Bears (Southwest Conference) (1945–1961)
1945–46	Baylor	25–5	11–1	1st	NCAA Regional Fourth Place
1946–47	Baylor	11–11	6–6	4th	
1947–48	Baylor	24–8	11–1	1st	NCAA Runner-up
1948–49	Baylor	14–10	9–3	T–1st	
1949–50	Baylor	14–13	8–4	T–1st	NCAA Fourth Place
1950–51	Baylor	8–16	3–9	6th	
1951–52	Baylor	6–18	5–7	T–3rd	
1952–53	Baylor	10–11	6–7	4th	
1953–54	Baylor	12–11	6–6	T–3rd	
1954–55	Baylor	13–11	7–5	4th	
1955–56	Baylor	6–17	3–9	T–5th	
1956–57	Baylor	9–15	6–6	T–3rd	
1957–58	Baylor	5–19	3–11	8th	
1958–59	Baylor	11–13	7–7	4th	
1959–60	Baylor	12–12	6–8	6th	
1960–61	Baylor	4–20	2–12	8th	
Baylor:		201–233 (.463)	108–117 (.480)		
Total:		201–233 (.463)			
National champion Postseason invitational champion Conference regular season champion Conference regular season and conference tournament champion Division regular season champion Division regular season and conference tournament champion Conference tournament champion

== See also ==
- List of NCAA Division I Men's Final Four appearances by coach
