= Bradley Braves men's basketball =

Basketball team that represents Bradley University

2026–27 Bradley Braves men's basketball team
- University: Bradley University
- Head coach: Brian Wardle (11th season)
- Location: Peoria, Illinois
- Arena: Carver Arena (capacity: 11,442)
- Conference: Missouri Valley
- Nickname: Bradley Braves
- Colors: Red and white

NCAA Division I tournament runner-up
- 1950, 1954
Other NCAA Division I tournament results
Final Four	1950, 1954
Elite Eight	1950, 1954, 1955
Sweet Sixteen	1954, 1955, 2006
Appearances	1950, 1954, 1955, 1980, 1986, 1988, 1996, 2006, 2019

Conference tournament champions
- 1980, 1988, 2019, 2020

Conference regular-season champions
- 1950, 1962, 1980, 1982, 1986, 1988, 1996, 2023

NIT champions
- 1957, 1960, 1964, 1982

Uniforms
Home	Away

The Bradley Braves men's basketball team represents Bradley University, located in Peoria, Illinois, in NCAA Division I basketball competition. They compete as a member of the Missouri Valley Conference. The Braves are currently coached by Brian Wardle and play their home games at Carver Arena.

Bradley has appeared in nine NCAA tournaments, including two Final Fours and national championship games in 1950 and 1954. They last appeared in the NCAA tournament in 2019 (they qualified for the 2020 tournament which was cancelled due to the COVID-19 pandemic), and last reached the NCAA Sweet Sixteen in 2006. The Braves have also appeared in the National Invitation Tournament 23 times with an all-time NIT record of 27–20 and have won four NIT championships (1957, 1960, 1964, and 1982), second only to St. John's in appearances (30) and titles (5). Until the introduction of the Vegas 16 tournament in 2016, the program was invited to the initial offering of every national postseason tournament.

== History ==
=== Early years ===
The Braves began playing basketball in 1902, starting out as independent.

One of their earliest coaches was Harold Olsen, who in 1959 was inducted to the Naismith Memorial Basketball Hall of Fame as a contributor for his 24 years guiding the Ohio State Buckeyes to multiple Final Fours, spearheading efforts to create the NCAA tournament, helping initiate the 10-second rule and coaching the Chicago Staggs to the finals of the first BAA (later renamed NBA) playoffs.

=== Alfred J. Robertson (1920–1948) ===
Alfred J. Robertson was named coach of the Braves football and basketball teams in 1920. Robertson coached both teams until 1948. He is Bradley's all-time winningest coach with 316 wins over 26 seasons. Robertson died in 1948.

In 1938, Bradley went 18–2 and was one of six teams invited to the inaugural NIT, where they lost 53–40 to eventual national champion Temple.

In 1939, Bradley went 19–3, and received invitations to both the inaugural NCAA Tournament and the second NIT. Bradley turned down the upstart NCAA Tournament and Oregon, which the Braves had defeated, took their bid, and went on to become the inaugural NCAA champion. Bradley lost in the NIT semifinal to Long Island, 36–32.

After a hiatus during World War II, the Braves qualified for the 1947 NIT, losing in the quarterfinals to West Virginia, 69–60.

=== Forddy Anderson (1948–1954) ===
Following Robertson's death, the school hired Forrest "Forddy" Anderson from Drake. Also in 1948, the school joined the Missouri Valley Conference for the first time.

==== National runner-up and scandal ====
In 1950, the Braves went 32–5 and won the MVC, earning a bid to the NCAA tournament. The Braves advanced to the National Championship game and lost 71–68 against CCNY, which accomplished perhaps the greatest feat in basketball history, winning the National Invitation and the NCAA tournaments in the same season.

However, in 1951, a point-shaving scandal rocked CCNY specifically, New York, and college basketball as a whole. The scandal affected Bradley as Bradley players Gene Melchiorre, Bill Mann, Bud Grover, Aaron Preece, and Jim Kelly admitted to taking bribes from gamblers to hold down scores against St. Joseph's in Philadelphia in 1951 and against Oregon State in Chicago. Melchiorre, Mann, and George Chianakos pleaded guilty to a misdemeanor, but avoided jail time. The others were not charged.

==== Continued success ====
In 1952, the Braves went 32–6 and lost to Syracuse 76–75 in the final of the National Campus Basketball Tournament, which was held in response to the point-shaving scandals centered around New York. After the season, the Braves left the Missouri Valley Conference and became independent again.

In 1954, though only going 19–13, the Braves again advanced to the NCAA tournament's championship game, this time falling short to La Salle, 92–76.

Anderson was hired away from Peoria to coach Michigan State after the season, where he would become the first coach in NCAA history to lead two schools to the Final Four.

Bob Vanatta coached the Braves for two seasons after Anderson departed, and led Bradley to the NCAA tournament Elite Eight in 1955 as an independent, where they lost to Colorado, 93–81. They returned to the MVC in 1955. Vanatta would go on to coach the Memphis Tigers.

=== Chuck Orsborn (1956–1965) ===
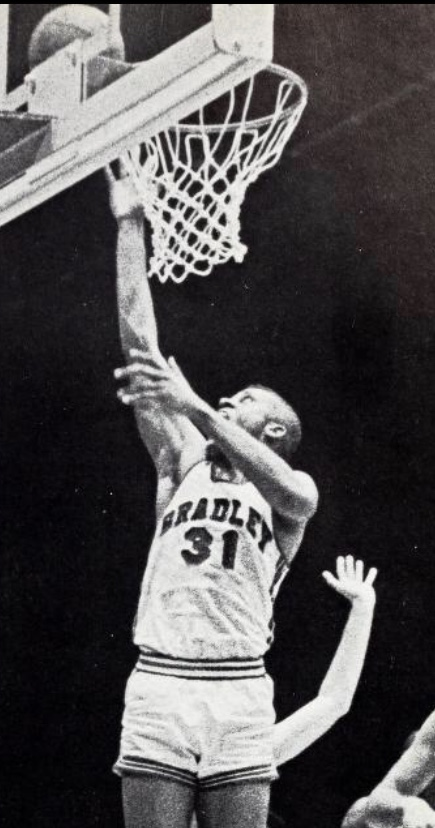
Chet Walker during the 1960-61 season.

Chuck Orsborn, a Bradley alum and basketball player in the 1930s, took over in 1956 after being an assistant from 1947 to 1956. In 1957, his first year as head coach, the Braves won the NIT championship over Memphis State, the school's first NIT title. The school returned to the NIT in 1958 and to the NIT championship game in 1959, losing to St. John's. In 1960, the Braves won their second NIT championship, defeating Providence in the title game. The Braves were led by Naismith Memorial Basketball Hall of Famer, 2-time Consensus first-team All-American, future NBA champion and 7 time NBA All Star Chet Walker.

In Orsborn's first six seasons, the Braves finished ranked in the top-20 in the final AP Poll, including finishing in the top six each year between 1959 and 1962. However, conference rival Cincinnati was in the midst of a run that ended in five straight Final Four appearances, including two national championships. In the days before at-large bids in the NCAA tournament, Bradley was left outside the tournament field all six seasons and never reached the NCAA tournament in nine seasons under Orsborn.

However, the Braves did win a share of their second MVC crown in 1962, sharing that title with eventual NCAA Champion Cincinnati, but lost in the NIT's first round. A return to the NIT in 1964 resulted in the Braves' third NIT championship in eight years. After another trip to the NIT in 1965, Orsborn took the position of Bradley's director of athletics and served in that function until 1978.

From 1956 to 1965, he compiled a record of 194–56 (.774). During this nine-year span as head coach, the Braves also earned six Associated Press top 20 finishes, Orsborn was named MVC coach of the year in 1960 and 1962. Orsborn also has the distinction of recording his first 100 victories in 120 games, which is sixth on the all-time list for college coaches.

=== Joe Stowell (1965–1978) ===
The Braves again turned to a Bradley alum as Joe Stowell, who was an assistant coach under Orsborn, became Bradley's ninth head coach in 1965. In his 13 years as head coach, the Braves made only two postseason appearances: the 1968 NIT and the 1974 National Commissioners Invitational tournament. He was fired as head coach in 1978. Stowell finished with 197 wins, the second most in Brave history.

=== Dick Versace (1978–1986) ===
Bradley hired Dick Versace from Jackson Community College in 1978. As an assistant at Michigan State University, Versace was heavily involved in the recruitment of Magic Johnson. Versace led Bradley to the MVC regular season and tournament championships in 1980, losing to Texas A&M in the NCAA tournament, 55–53. He won the regular season MVC championship again in 1982, but was snubbed by the NCAA selection committee, and the team won the NIT championship, defeating Purdue 67–58 at Madison Square Garden.

In the 1985–86 season, he was named National College Coach of the Year by the U.S. Basketball Writers' Association as the Braves went 32–3 and were ranked as high as #7 in the nation during the season, capturing the MVC title before falling to eventual national champion Louisville in the NCAA tournament second round. His back court players included future NBA All Star Hersey Hawkins and future NBAer and Bradley Head Coach Jim Les. After this season, Versace left for the NBA where he became head coach of the Indiana Pacers and eventually President and General Manager of the Memphis Grizzlies.

=== Stan Albeck (1986–1991) ===
Bradley alumnus and former Chicago Bulls head coach Stan Albeck was hired to lead the Braves in 1986. In 1988, Albeck led the Braves to the MVC regular season and tournament titles behind National Player of the Year and national scoring leader Hersey Hawkins, and finished #11 in the final Associated Press Poll before losing to Auburn in the NCAA tournament, 90–86. After leaving Bradley in 1991, Albeck became an assistant for the New Jersey Nets, Atlanta Hawks and Toronto Raptors of the NBA.

=== Jim Molinari (1991–2002) ===
Bradley turned to Northern Illinois University head coach Jim Molinari to lead the Braves in 1991. After NIT appearances in 1994 and 1995 the Braves, led by future NBA first round draft pick Anthony Parker, captured the MVC championship in 1996 and advanced to the NCAA tournament where they were defeated by Stanford, 66–58. Molinari led the Braves to NIT appearances again in 1997, 1999 and 2001.

=== Jim Les (2002–2011) ===
Bradley turned to another alum, Jim Les, to take over for Molinari. Les was a senior on the 1986 Braves squad that went 32–3 before losing in the second round of the NCAA tournament. However, the Braves failed to finish above .500 in Les's first three years as head coach.

In 2006, the Braves won their final five games of the season to finish in a tie for fifth place in MVC play. The Braves surprised in the MVC tournament, reaching the championship game before losing to Southern Illinois. The Braves received an at-large bid to the NCAA tournament as a No. 13 seed, their first trip to the Tournament since 1996. In the Tournament, the Braves upset No. 4-ranked Kansas in the first round and upset No. 5-ranked Pittsburgh to advance to the Sweet Sixteen for the first time since 1955. In the Sweet Sixteen, the No. 1-seeded Memphis defeated the Braves. After the season ended, Bradley's star center Patrick O'Bryant declared for the NBA draft where he was drafted 9th overall.

Each of Les's next three Brave teams appeared in postseason play, losing in the second round of the 2007 NIT, and finishing as runners-up in the 2008 College Basketball Invitational and 2009 CollegeInsider.com Tournament.

After a disappointing 2010 and a 20-loss 2011, the Braves fired Les.

=== Geno Ford (2011–2015) ===
Kent State head coach Geno Ford was hired to replace Les. Ford's teams struggled under his leadership, failing to win more than seven games in conference play and finishing in last place in his first and final years at Bradley. The Braves did receive an invite to the College Basketball Invitational in 2013, where they advanced to the quarterfinals. In his final year, the Braves finished 9–24, 3–15 in MVC play. After the season, Ford was fired. He finished with a four-year record of 46–86 at Bradley.

Ford's tenure at Bradley was most notable for a lawsuit filed by Kent State, his former employer, seeking payment on a buyout clause in his contract. Ford was found liable for $1.2 million. Kent State continued actions against Bradley for "tortious interference with Kent State’s contractual relationship" with Ford, but Kent State dropped the case in 2013.

=== Brian Wardle (2015–present) ===
Following Geno Ford's firing, the school hired Green Bay head coach Brian Wardle. In Wardle's first year, the Braves continued their struggles, finishing the season 5–24 and in last place in the MVC. Wardle would have over 10 freshmen and only Donte Thomas was an active player who stayed from the Geno Ford era. In 2017, with Junior Donte Thomas as their best player, the 2017 Braves team improved to a 13–20 record and finished in a tie for sixth place in MVC play. In 2018 the Braves finished 20–13 while going 9–9 in the conference. They defeated Drake in the first round of the MVC tournament. Bradley then played #1 seeded Loyola-Chicago, the eventual standout Final Four team. Bradley failed to score down the stretch and lost a close game.

In 2019 Wardle led the Braves to the Cancun Challenge championship over Penn State. After this the Braves slumped and went 0–5 in conference play. The Braves regrouped and finished 5th in MVC play at 9–9. They beat Missouri State and upset Loyola-Chicago. Bradley looked to capture their first MVC tournament title since 1988. They played UNI, the 6 seed, and were down by 18 points in the second half. Bradley rallied and cut the deficit to 6 with a 12–0 point run. The Braves went on to win the game. They entered March Madness for the first time since 2006 but lost to Michigan State 76–65 in the opening round. It was Coach Wardle's first NCAA tournament appearance with the Braves.

Wardle led the Braves to another improved season in 2019–20. Bradley finished with an overall record of 23–11 and 11–7 in Missouri Valley Conference play. Bradley won the MVC tournament title for the second year in a row. Due to COVID-19, the NCAA tournament was cancelled leaving the Braves without a postseason appearance.

== Postseason appearances ==
=== NCAA tournament results ===
The Braves have appeared in nine NCAA Tournaments and have advanced to two final fours and two national championship games. Their combined record is 11–9. They qualified for the 2020 NCAA Tournament, which was subsequently cancelled.

Year	Seed	Round	Opponent	Result
1950		Elite Eight; Final Four; National Championship Game	UCLA; Baylor; CCNY	W 73–59; W 68–66; L 68–71
1954		First round Sweet Sixteen; Elite Eight; Final Four; National Championship Game	Oklahoma City; Colorado; Oklahoma A&M; USC; La Salle	W 61–55; W 76–64; W 71–57; W 74–72; L 76–92
1955		First round Sweet Sixteen; Elite Eight	Oklahoma City; SMU; Colorado	W 69–65; W 81–79; L 81–93
1980	#11	First round	#6 Texas A&M	L 53–55
1986	#7	First round Second round	#10 UTEP #2 Louisville	W 83–65; L 68–82
1988	#9	First round	#8 Auburn	L 86–90
1996	#8	First round	#9 Stanford	L 58–66
2006	#13	First round Second round Sweet Sixteen	#4 Kansas #5 Pittsburgh #1 Memphis	W 77–73; W 72–66; L 64–80
2019	#15	First round	#2 Michigan State	L 65–76

=== NIT results ===
The Braves have appeared in 25 National Invitation Tournaments and are four-time champions (1957, 1960, 1964, and 1982). Their combined record is 28–22.

Year	Round	Opponent	Result
1938	Quarterfinals	Temple	L 40–53
1939	Semifinals	Long Island	L 32–36
1947	Quarterfinals	West Virginia	L 60–69
1949	First round Quarterfinals; Semifinals; Third-place game	NYU; Western Kentucky; Loyola (IL); Bowling Green	W 78–66; W 82–72; L 61–69; L 77–82
1950	Quarterfinals; Semifinals; Championship Game	Syracuse; St. John's; CCNY	W 78–66; W 83–65; L 61–69
1957	Quarterfinals; Semifinals; Championship Game	Xavier; Temple; Memphis State	W 116–81; W 94–66; W 84–83
1958	Quarterfinals	Xavier	L 62–72
1959	Quarterfinals; Semifinals; Championship Game	Butler; NYU; St. John's	W 83–77; W 59–57; L 71–76
1960	Quarterfinals; Semifinals; Championship Game	Dayton; St. Bonaventure; Providence	W 78–64; W 82–71; W 88–72
1962	Quarterfinals	Duquesne	L 85–88
1964	Quarterfinals; Semifinals; Championship Game	St. Joseph's; Army; New Mexico	W 83–81; W 67–52; W 86–54
1965	First round	NYU	L 70–71
1968	Sweet Sixteen	Long Island	L 77–80
1982	First round Sweet Sixteen; Elite Eight; Final Four; Championship Game	American; Syracuse; Tulane; Oklahoma; Purdue	W 76–65; W 95–81; W 77–61; W 84–68; W 67–58
1985	First round	Marquette	L 68–77
1994	First round Sweet Sixteen; Elite Eight	Murray State; Old Dominion; Siena	W 66–58; W 79–75; L 62–75
1995	First round Sweet Sixteen	Eastern Michigan; Canisius	W 86–85; L 53–55
1997	First round Sweet Sixteen	Drexel; Connecticut	W 66–53; L 47–63
1999	First round	Butler	L 50–51
2001	First round	Detroit-Mercy	L 49–68
2007	First round Sweet Sixteen	Providence; Mississippi St.	W 90–78; L 72–101
2023	First round	Wisconsin	L 62–81
2024	First round Sweet Sixteen	Loyola (IL); Cincinnati	W 74–62; L 57–74
2025	First round Second round Quarterfinals	North Alabama; George Mason; Chattanooga	W 71–62; W 75–67; L 65–67
2026	First round	Dayton	L 66–80

=== CBI results ===
The Braves have participated in one College Basketball Invitational in 2008 where they advanced to the 3–game series final. Their combined record is 4–2.

Year	Round	Opponent	Result
2008	First round Quarterfinals; Semifinals; Finals Game 1 Finals Game 2 Finals Game 3	Cincinnati; Ohio; Virginia; Tulsa; Tulsa; Tulsa	W 70–67; W 79–73; W 96–85; L 68–73; W 83–74; L 64–70

=== CIT results ===
The Braves have participated in two CollegeInsider.com Postseason Tournaments (CIT). In 2009 they advanced to the championship game. Their combined record is 5–2.

Year	Round	Opponent	Result
2009	First round Quarterfinals; Semifinals; Championship	Austin Peay; Oakland; Pacific; Old Dominion	W 81–74; W 76–75; W 59–46; L 62–66
2013	First round Second round Quarterfinals	Green Bay; Tulane; Northern Iowa	W 75–69; W 77–72; L 77–90

=== NCIT Results ===
Bradley participated in the 1974 National Commissioners Invitational Tournament where they advanced to the semifinals. Their record is 1–1.

Year	Round	Opponent	Result
1974	First round Semifinals	Kansas State; Southern California	W 68–64; L 73–76

=== National Campus Basketball Tournament results ===
The Braves appeared in, and hosted, the only National Campus Basketball Tournament. Their record is 2–1.

Year	Round	Opponent	Result
1951	Quarterfinals; Semifinals; Finals	Western Kentucky; Wyoming; Syracuse	W 75–71; W 77–63; L 75–76

== I-74 Rivalry ==
The I-74 Rivalry (also known as The War on I-74) is an annual rivalry game between Illinois State and Bradley University, which are located less than 40 miles apart on Interstate 74.

== Notable players ==
=== Retired numbers ===
Seven Braves have had their numbers retired by Bradley University:

Bradley Braves retired numbers
No.	Player	Position	Career	Year retired
11	J. J. Anderson	SF	1978–1982	1999
15	Paul Unruh	F / C	1946–1950	1991
31	Joe Allen	C	1965–1968	1994
31	Chet Walker	SF / PF	1959–1962	1976
33	Bob Carney	SG	1951–1954	1994
33	Hersey Hawkins	SG	1984–1988	1988
45	Roger Phegley	SG / SF	1974–1978	1990

=== NBA/ABA players ===
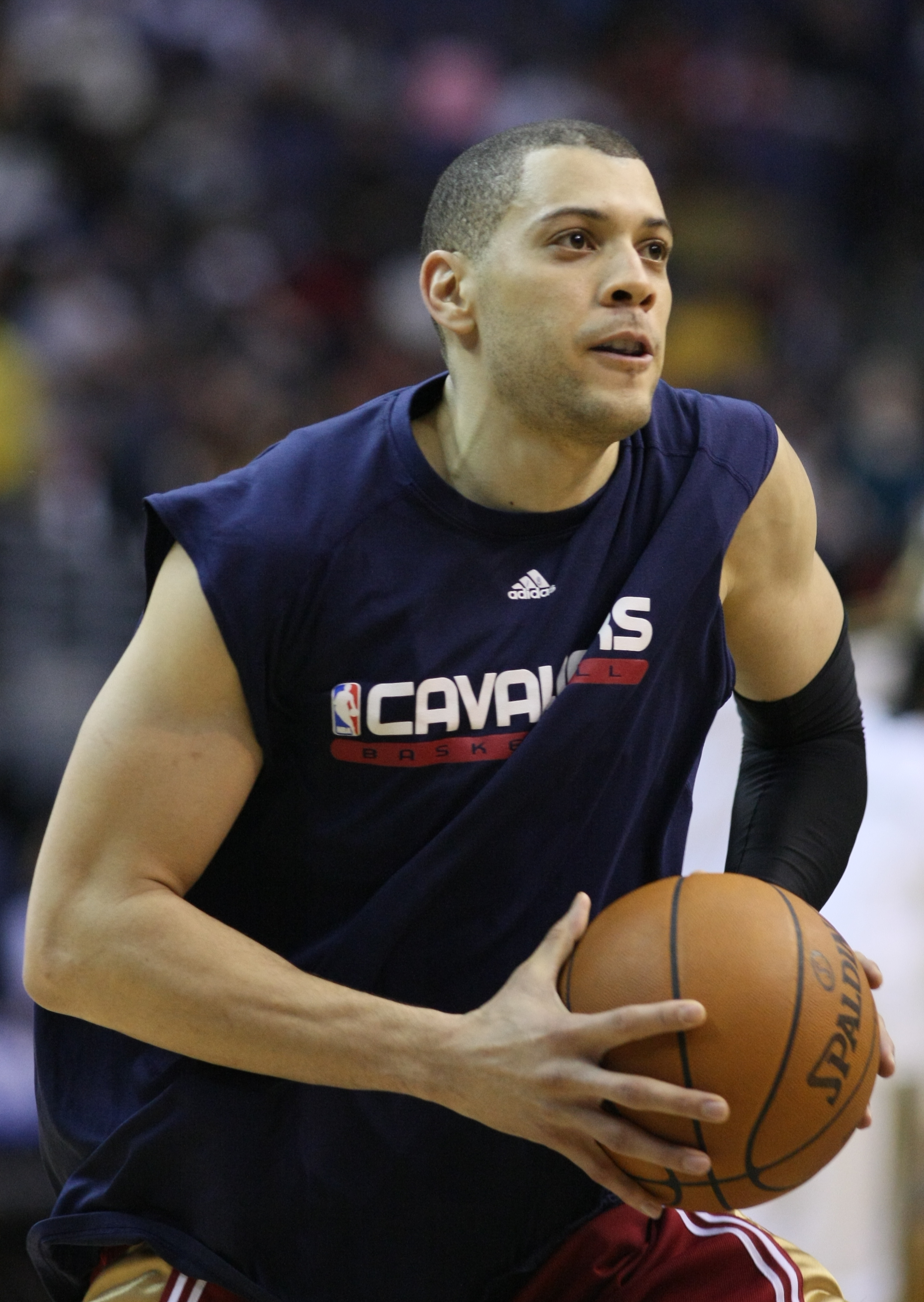
Anthony Parker with the Cavaliers.

- J. J. Anderson
- Elmer Behnke
- Barney Cable
- Bob Carney
- Danny Granger
- Hersey Hawkins
- Steve Kuberski
- Walt Lemon Jr.
- Malevy Leons
- Jim Les
- Shellie McMillon
- Patrick O'Bryant
- Anthony Parker
- Roger Phegley
- Ray Ramsey
- Al Smith
- Joe Strawder
- Levern Tart
- David Thirdkill
- Chet Walker
- Mike Williams
- Voise Winters

== International players ==
- Elijah Childs (born 1999), basketball player in the Israeli Basketball Premier League
- Scottie James (born 1996), basketball player for Hapoel Haifa in the Israeli Basketball Premier League
- Luuk van Bree (born 1996), basketball player for Leiden BNXT League (Belgium&Netherlands)

=== Bradley Basketball Team of the Century (1903–2002) ===
The Bradley athletic department celebrated 100 years of Braves basketball in the 2003–04 season. Fans were given the opportunity to select the greatest players from each of seven specific timelines, resulting in a total of 60 players. Throughout the 2002–03 season, those 60 players were honored at selected games. Fans were given the opportunity to help select the 15 greatest players in the program's history, creating the team of the century. The team was honored during a ceremony at the Peoria Civic Center on November 21, 2003. In addition to the “Team of the Century,” Braves fans also selected a “Game of the Century” by voting games through a 16-entry, tournament format. Ultimately, Bradley's January 16, 1960 win over #1 Cincinnati at Robertson Fieldhouse was selected.

No.	Player	Pos.	Career	Height	Hometown	National Player of the Year	All-American	MVC Player of the Year	MVC All Conference	Retired Jersey
31	Joe Allen	C	1965–68	6–6	Chicago, IL		✓		✓	✓
11	Mitchell Anderson	F	1979–82	6–8	Chicago, IL		✓		✓	✓
33	Bob Carney	G	1951–54	6–1	Aurora, IL		✓		✓	✓
33	Hersey Hawkins	G	1984–88	6–3	Chicago, IL	✓	✓	✓	✓	✓
15	Jim Les	G	1983–86	5–11	Niles, IL			✓	✓	
12	Anthony Manuel	G	1985–89	5–11	Chicago, IL			✓	✓	
21	Bobby Joe Mason	G/F	1956–60	6–2	Centralia, IL		✓		✓	
23	Gene Melchiorre	F	1947–51	5–8	Highland Park, IL		✓		✓	
24	Anthony Parker	G	1993–97	6–5	Naperville, IL		✓	✓	✓	
45	Roger Phegley	G	1975–78	6–7	East Peoria, IL		✓	✓	✓	✓
32	Al Smith	G	1966–68; 1970–71	6–0	Peoria, IL				✓	
12, 31	Levern Tart	G/F	1961–64	6–2	West Palm Beach, FL		✓		✓	
35	David Thirdkill	F	1979–82	6–7	St. Louis, MO				✓	
15	Paul Unruh	C	1946–50	6–4	Toulon, IL		✓		✓	✓
31	Chet Walker	F/C	1959–62	6–6	Benton Harbor, MI		✓		✓	✓
