= Hiram Scott College =

Private college in Scottsbluff, Nebraska, US

Coordinates: 41°53′36″N 103°40′51″W

- Motto: Lux et veritas (Latin) (Light and truth)
- Type: Private Liberal Arts College
- Established: 1965
- President: Dr. Walter Weese
- Faculty: 30 (1972)
- Students: 1500 (1972)
- Location: Scottsbluff, Nebraska, United States
- Campus: Urban, 280 acres
- Nickname: Scotties
- Website: hiramscott.com

Hiram Scott College was a private liberal arts college that operated from 1965 to 1972 in Scottsbluff, Nebraska. Named after Hiram Scott (1805–1828), a fur trapper with the Rocky Mountain Fur Company who was found dead in the vicinity on his return trip from a fur expedition, the institution was one of several Midwestern colleges established by local civic leaders with the support of Parsons College in Fairfield, Iowa. These Parsons "satellite schools" were by-products of the strong growth and apparent success of Parsons during the late 1950s and early 1960s, and all followed the "Parsons Plan" academic model developed at that school. None of the schools, however, were ultimately successful.

The "Parsons Plan" academic model employed at Hiram Scott was devised by Millard Roberts, who was the president of Parsons College from 1955 to 1967; the plan featured innovative teaching and administrative techniques, and emphasized the recruitment of a geographically and academically diverse student body.

Strapped for cash from its inception, to survive Hiram Scott had to keep enrollment at capacity. Each semester 30% of the student body dropped out, dissatisfied with the school's limited curriculum. Instead of looking for ways to keep the students it had, Hiram Scott expanded its recruiting staff to the point that it cost $700 to recruit a student who would pay $2,500 in yearly fees. In December 1970, the trustees declared bankruptcy.

In 1974, the buildings and grounds were acquired by the University of Nebraska–Lincoln and converted to their present use. The college’s main academic building, now known as the J.G. Elliott Building, was converted for use by the University of Nebraska Panhandle Research and Extension Center, while Hiram Scott’s student services building became the State Office Complex. Four large dormitories that flanked the student center have since been removed.

== Notable alumni ==
Althea Kireilis, US Army Lieutenant Colonel (Ret) is Chief Procurement and Contract Management Officer for the Executive Office of the President. Poet Craig Czury (God's Shiny Glass Eye), and Clear Channel Radio broadcaster Ira Mellman are also Hiram Scott alumni. Nebraska's singing historian, Dr. Robert Manley, who was also writer of the state song "Beautiful Nebraska", taught there for a time. In 1996 John Wilmerding ('70), a justice reform activist, became the first Secretary of the United Nations Working Party on Restorative Justice. Mark Masterton, a charter student at HSC later was elected to the Scotts Bluff County Board of Commissioners and served 24 years on the Board and 21 years as the Board Chairman. Richie Moore was selected in the third round of the 1967 NBA draft by the San Diego Rockets, then spent one season with the Denver Rockets. Nelson Munsey went on to play football with the University of Wyoming and then the Baltimore Colts. Mike Jay later became starting quarterback for Texas A&M University.Rebecca (Rohret) Irving ('71) obtained her law degree from the University of Montana ('79). She practiced and owned a successful trial litigation firm in Maine and is the Chief Judge for the Passamaquoddy Indian Tribe. She is a Glassman Award recipient. (https://www.bangordailynews.com/2017/06/19/news/pioneering-machias-lawyer-tribal-judge-wins-glassman-award/)

== See also ==
- Forddy Anderson, the first men's basketball coach and athletic director in the school's history
- Dick Beechner, the only football head coach in the school's program's history

== External sources ==
- Time article
- starherald.com
