= Paul Unruh =

American basketball player (1928–2023)

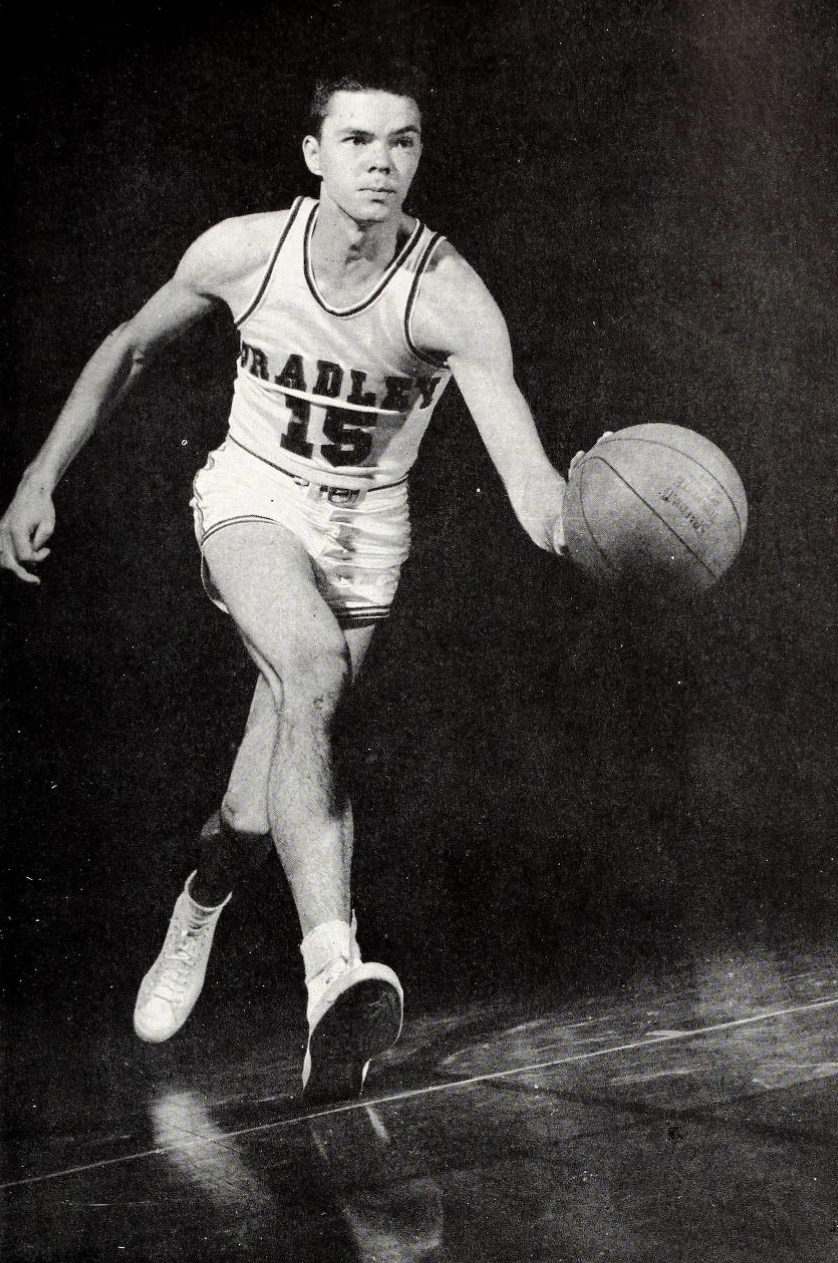
- Unruh as a senior at Bradley

Personal information
- Born: May 7, 1928 Hammond, Indiana, U.S.
- Died: December 8, 2023 (aged 95) Peoria, Illinois, U.S.
- Listed height: 6 ft 4 in (1.93 m)
- Listed weight: 180 lb (82 kg)

Career information
- High school: Toulon (Toulon, Illinois)
- College: Bradley (1946–1950)
- NBA draft: 1950: 2nd round, 20th overall pick
- Drafted by: Indianapolis Olympians
- Position: Power forward / center

Career highlights
- Consensus first-team All-American (1950); 2× First-team All-MVC (1949, 1950); No. 15 retired by Bradley Braves
- Stats at Basketball Reference

Paul Richard Unruh (May 7, 1928 – December 8, 2023) was an American college basketball standout at Bradley University from 1946 to 1950. He finished as Bradley's all-time leading scorer and was a consensus first-team All-American as a senior in 1949–50. A native of the greater Peoria, Illinois metropolitan area, Unruh attended Toulon High School prior to matriculating at Bradley.

== Bradley career ==
As a freshman in 1946–47, Unruh scored 383 points, which was a freshman scoring record at Bradley until Mitchell "J.J." Anderson surpassed it in 1979. Over the course of his four-year career, Unruh scored 1,822 points and led Bradley in scoring all four seasons. When he graduated he was the school's all-time leading scorer and is one of two players to lead the Braves in scoring all four years. In his senior season, Unruh scored 475 points while leading Bradley to second-place finishes to CCNY in both the National Invitation Tournament (NIT) and National Collegiate Athletic Association (NCAA) Tournament—a single-year tournament performance that had never been accomplished, nor will ever be repeated due to the impossibility of a team participating in both postseason tournaments in the same season. When Unruh's career ended, he had won 112 of the 135 games he played in during his tenure and is considered one of the pioneers of the modern jump shot.

Unruh was selected as the ninth pick in the second round (20th overall) of the 1950 NBA draft by the Indianapolis Olympians, but never ended up playing in the league.

== Post-college ==
Two years after graduating from Bradley, Unruh earned a spot on the United States Olympic basketball team's roster. He was drafted into the army, however, and missed out on an opportunity to win a gold medal at the 1952 Summer Olympics in Helsinki, Finland. He played for the National AAU Basketball League's Peoria Cats after his stint in the military, but did not play competitively afterward.

Unruh returned to Peoria and entered the insurance business. He got married and had three children: Brent, Brenda and Bryce. He died on December 8, 2023, at the age of 95.
