= Forddy Anderson =

American basketball coach (1919–1999)

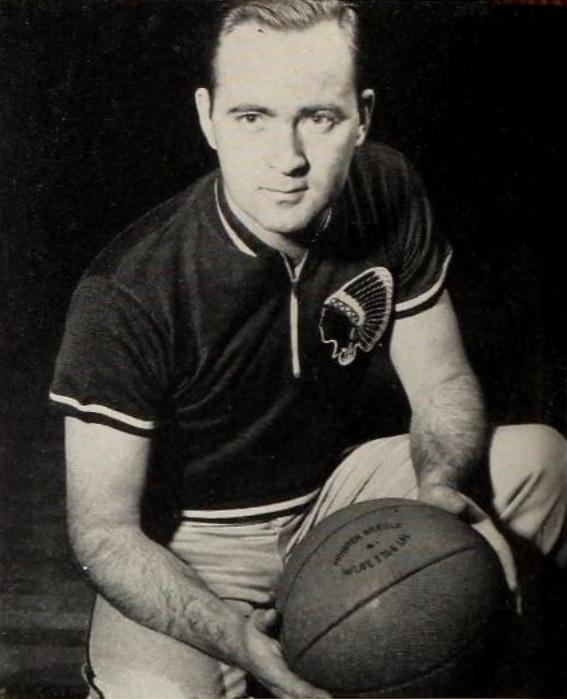
- Anderson from the 1953 Anaga

Biographical details
- Born: March 17, 1919; Gary, Indiana, U.S.
- Died: October 25, 1999 (aged 80); Oklahoma City, Oklahoma, U.S.

Playing career
- 1939–1941: Stanford

Coaching career (HC unless noted)
- 1946–1948: Drake
- 1948–1954: Bradley
- 1954–1965: Michigan State
- 1965–1970: Hiram Scott

Administrative career (AD unless noted)
- 1965–1970: Hiram Scott

Head coaching record
- Overall: 299–203
- Tournaments: 9–5 (NCAA / NCAA University Division); 4–3 (NIT)

Accomplishments and honors

Championships
- 3 NCAA Regional—Final Four (1950, 1954, 1957); MVC regular season (1950); 2 Big Ten regular season (1957, 1959)

Forrest "Forddy" Anderson (March 17, 1919 – October 25, 1999) was an American basketball coach. He was the first coach in NCAA history to take two different teams to the Final Four; Bradley in 1950 and 1954 and Michigan State in 1957.

== Early life ==
The Gary, Indiana native led his Ralph W. Emerson High to an IHSAA Sectional title in 1937; he was recruited to Stanford University by fellow Indiana native Everett Dean. Anderson was named All-Pacific Coast after the 1940–41 season; after Pearl Harbor was attacked, he joined the US Navy and spent two years at Great Lakes Training Facility, where he played basketball for Tony Hinkle.

== Coaching career ==
After completing his Stanford degree in 1946, he was hired as the basketball coach at Drake University. Anderson was considered one of the most innovative coaches of his era and served a combined 24 seasons as head men's basketball coach at Drake University (1946–1948), Bradley University (1948–1954), Michigan State University (1954–1965) and Hiram Scott College (1965–1970).

Anderson twice led his Bradley teams to the NCAA Finals (1950 and 1954). His 1950 team also finished as the NIT runner-up.

He moved to Michigan State, where his 1957 Big Ten Champion Michigan State club finished fourth in the NCAA tournament and his 1959 Michigan State team lost in the Elite Eight (regional finals).

He was fired in the spring of 1965, whereupon he was recruited to assist in creating the athletic department at Hiram Scott College. After Hiram Scott closed its doors, he was the head coach of Peru's national team during the 1970–71 FIBA seasons.

He then began a long career as a collegiate scout for the Boston Celtics during the 1980s and 1990s. He was instrumental in many of the Celtics' draft picks during that era.

== Personal life ==
Forddy Anderson and his wife Constance "Pat" Anderson were the parents of four children, Constance, Barbara, Forrest Jr. (Frosty) and Tracey. Anderson died on October 25, 1999, in Oklahoma City, Oklahoma, at the age of 80, after suffering from complications due to pneumonia.

== Head coaching record ==
Record table
Season	Team	Overall	Conference	Standing	Postseason
Drake Bulldogs (Missouri Valley Conference) (1946–1948)
1946–47	Drake	18–11	8–4	T–2nd	
1947–48	Drake	14–12	5–5	3rd	
Drake:		32–23 (.582)	13–9 (.591)		
Bradley Braves (Missouri Valley Conference) (1948–1951)
1948–49	Bradley	27–8	6–4	3rd	NIT Fourth Place
1949–50	Bradley	32–5	11–1	1st	NCAA Runner-up, NIT Runner-up
1950–51	Bradley	32–6	11–3	2nd	
Bradley Braves (Independent) (1951–1954)
1951–52	Bradley	17–12			
1952–53	Bradley	15–12			
1953–54	Bradley	19–13			NCAA Runner-up
Bradley:		142–56 (.717)	28–8 (.778)		
Michigan State Spartans (Big Ten Conference) (1954–1965)
1954–55	Michigan State	13–9	8–6	4th	
1955–56	Michigan State	13–9	7–7	5th	
1956–57	Michigan State	16–10	10–4	T–1st	NCAA University Division Final Four
1957–58	Michigan State	16–6	9–5	2nd	
1958–59	Michigan State	19–4	12–2	1st	NCAA University Division Elite Eight
1959–60	Michigan State	10–11	5–9	8th	
1960–61	Michigan State	7–17	3–11	9th	
1961–62	Michigan State	8–14	3–11	T–9th	
1962–63	Michigan State	4–16	3–11	9th	
1963–64	Michigan State	14–10	8–6	T–4th	
1964–65	Michigan State	5–18	1–13	10th	
Michigan State:		125–124 (.502)	69–85 (.448)		
Total:		299–203 (.596)			
National champion Postseason invitational champion Conference regular season champion Conference regular season and conference tournament champion Division regular season champion Division regular season and conference tournament champion Conference tournament champion

== See also ==
- List of NCAA Division I Men's Final Four appearances by coach
