= 1949–50 Baylor Bears basketball team =

American college basketball season

1949–50 Baylor Bears men's basketball

Southwest Conference champions

NCAA tournament, Fourth place
- Conference: Southwest Conference
- Record: 14–13 (8–6 SWC)
- Head coach: Bill Henderson (7th season)
- Home arena: Marrs McLean Gymnasium

1949–50 Southwest Conference men's basketball standings
	Conf.				Overall
Team	W		L	PCT	W		L	PCT
Baylor	8	–	4	.667	14	–	13	.519
Arkansas	8	–	4	.667	12	–	12	.500
SMU	7	–	5	.583	10	–	13	.435
Texas	6	–	6	.500	13	–	11	.542
Texas A&M	6	–	6	.500	10	–	14	.417
TCU	5	–	7	.417	13	–	11	.542
Rice	2	–	10	.167	8	–	15	.348
Rankings from AP poll

The 1949–50 Baylor Bears men's basketball team represented the Baylor University as a member of the Southwest Conference (SWC) during the 1949–50 NCAA Division I men's basketball season. Led by 7th-year head coach Bill Henderson, the team played their home games at Marrs McLean Gymnasium in Waco, Texas.

After a February 3 loss to Texas A&M, the Bears were 8–11 overall and 3–4 in SWC games. They ran off five consecutive wins to close the regular season and tie for the conference title with an 8–4 record. Due to a season sweep of Arkansas, Baylor was selected to play in the 8-team NCAA tournament. The Bears defeated BYU before losing to the No.1 ranked, eventual National champion Bradley Braves. Baylor would travel to New York City for the National consolation game, where they were defeated by No. 5 NC State to close the season with a 14–13 record.

This season marked the second Final Four for the Bears in three seasons (1948). Baylor would not return to the Final Four until winning the National championship in 2021.

== Roster ==
1949–50 Baylor Bears men's basketball team
Players
Coaches

Pos.	#	Name	Height	Weight	Year	Hometown
F	14	Bill DeWitt	6 ft 3 in (1.91 m)	—	Sr
C		Don Heathington	6 ft 3 in (1.91 m)	—	Sr

Head coach

- Bill Henderson

Assistant coach(es)

Legend

- (C) Team captain
- (S) Suspended
- (I) Ineligible
- (W) Walk-on
- Injured
- Current redshirt

== Schedule and results ==
Date time, TV	Rank^{#}	Opponent^{#}	Result	Record	Site city, state
Non-conference regular season
Dec 5, 1949*		North Texas	W 59–37	1–0	Marrs McLean Gymnasium; Waco, Texas
Dec 8, 1949*		Texas Tech	W 58–37	2–0	Marrs McLean Gymnasium; Waco, Texas
Dec 10, 1949*		at Stephen F. Austin	W 57–47	3–0	Nacogdoches, Texas
Dec 13, 1949*		Texas Wesleyan	W 52–51	4–0	Marrs McLean Gymnasium; Waco, Texas
Dec 16, 1949*		at Kansas State	L 30–78	4–1	Nichols Hall; Manhattan, Kansas
Dec 17, 1949*		at Nebraska	L 55–69	4–2	Nebraska Coliseum; Lincoln, Nebraska
Dec 20, 1949*		vs. Tulane	L 53–86	4–3	San Antonio, Texas
Dec 27, 1949*		at Oklahoma City; All-College Basketball Classic	L 32–43	4–4	Oklahoma City, Oklahoma
Dec 28, 1949*		vs. Vanderbilt; All-College Basketball Classic	W 61–53	5–4	Oklahoma City, Oklahoma
Dec 29, 1949*		vs. Texas; All-College Basketball Classic	L 41–49	5–5	Oklahoma City, Oklahoma
Dec 30, 1949*		vs. Saint Louis; Cotton Bowl tournament	L 50–58	5–6	Dallas, Texas
Dec 31, 1949*		SMU; Cotton Bowl tournament	L 37–61	5–7	Dallas, Texas
Southwest Conference regular season
Jan 7, 1950		Texas	W 49–43	6–7 (1–0)	Marrs McLean Gymnasium; Waco, Texas
Jan 14, 1950		at SMU	L 47–50	6–8 (1–1)	Perkins Gym; Dallas, Texas
Jan 18, 1950		at TCU	L 54–64	6–9 (1–2)	Will Rogers Memorial Center; Fort Worth, Texas
Jan 21, 1950		Rice	W 52–43	7–9 (2–2)	Marrs McLean Gymnasium; Waco, Texas
Jan 27, 1950		Texas A&M	L 45–56	7–10 (2–3)	Marrs McLean Gymnasium; Waco, Texas
Jan 28, 1950		at Arkansas	W 60–49	8–10 (3–3)	Men's Gymnasium; Fayetteville, Arkansas
Feb 3, 1950		Texas A&M	L 54–56	8–11 (3–4)	Marrs McLean Gymnasium; Waco, Texas
Feb 4, 1950		Arkansas	W 52–42	9–11 (4–4)	Marrs McLean Gymnasium; Waco, Texas
Feb 15, 1950		at Rice	W 60–59	10–11 (5–4)	Houston, Texas
Feb 21, 1950		at Texas	W 43–41	11–11 (6–4)	Gregory Gymnasium; Austin, Texas
Feb 25, 1950		TCU	W 57–42	12–11 (7–4)	Marrs McLean Gymnasium; Waco, Texas
Feb 28, 1950		SMU	W 70–61	13–11 (8–4)	Marrs McLean Gymnasium; Waco, Texas
NCAA tournament
Mar 24, 1950*		vs. BYU; National Quarterfinal – Elite Eight	W 56–55	14–11	Municipal Auditorium; Kansas City, Missouri
Mar 25, 1950*		vs. No. 1 Bradley; National Semifinal – Final Four	L 66–68	14–12	Municipal Auditorium; Kansas City, Missouri
Mar 28, 1950*		vs. No. 5 NC State; Third place game	L 41–53	14–13	Madison Square Garden; New York, New York
*Non-conference game. ^{#}Rankings from AP Poll. (#) Tournament seedings in parentheses.
