= David Polansky =

American basketball coach

David Polansky (November 16, 1919 – June 16, 2003) was an American basketball coach. As an assistant, he replaced Nat Holman three times as head basketball coach at City College of New York (CCNY). Polansky first took over in 1952 when Holman was suspended after the 1951 betting scandals wrecked the Beavers program. After Holman won reinstatement, Polansky remained his assistant in 1954 and twice relieved his boss again (illness in 1956 and retirement in 1959). He then coached C.C.N.Y. for 10 full seasons before his own resignation in February 1971, after an 82–80 loss to Pace. Although Polansky had only six losing seasons in 15 years, he finished with a 127–135 overall record.

Following his coaching career, Polansky purchased Camp Kent, a summer camp located in Kent, Connecticut, and owned and directed the camp until it closed in 1982. In the decades following its closing, the Camp Kent community remained particularly close-knit, holding frequent reunions and maintaining life long friendships. In the social media era, the Camp Kent alumni community is more closely connected than ever, holding even more frequent outings and reunions.
