= Dick Beechner =

American football coach

Biographical details
- Education: University of Nebraska (1956, 1964)

Playing career

Golf
- 1953–1956: Nebraska

Coaching career (HC unless noted)

Football
- 1956–1957: Lincoln HS (NE) (reserve)
- 1958–1964: Lincoln HS (NE) (assistant)
- 1965: Nebraska (GA)
- 1966–1970: Hiram Scott
- 1974: Nebraska (GA)
- 1975: Nebraska (C)
- 1977: Washington State (AHC/OL)
- 1978–1981: Missouri (ST/TE)

Golf
- 1956–1964: Lincoln HS (NE)
- 1966–1970: Hiram Scott
- 1997–2009: Nebraska–Kearney

Administrative career (AD unless noted)
- 1970: Hiram Scott
- 1982–1984: Washington State (assoc. AD)
- 1987–1996: Kearney State / Nebraska–Kearney

Head coaching record
- Overall: 26–14–1 (college football)

Richard Beechner is an American former football coach. He served as the head football coach at Hiram Scott College in Scottsbluff, Nebraska. He was the only head football coach in the school's history because Hiram Scott only existed from 1965 to 1970, and was shut down due to massive debt. Hiram Scott did not have a single losing season in its five years as a football program. Its two biggest wins came on September 24, 1966 over the Omaha (13–7) and on November 7, 1970 over Boise State (7–3).

Beechner was also an assistant football coach at Nebraska, Missouri, and Washington State.

== Personal life and noncoaching career ==
While not coaching between 1971 and 1973, Beechner worked for the West Nebraska Express trucking company and was the director of field services for the Nebraska Motor Carriers' Association.

In 1976, Beechner transitioned from an assistant football position to a position in Nebraska's administrative staff. In 1983, he left coaching to become an associate athletic director at Washington State.

Beechner served as the athletic director for Hiram Scott in 1970 and Nebraska–Kearney from 1987 to 1996.

== Head coaching record ==
=== College football ===
Year	Team	Overall	Conference	Standing	Bowl/playoffs
Hiram Scott Scotties (NCAA College Division independent) (1966–1970)
1966	Hiram Scott	5–2			
1967	Hiram Scott	5–3			
1968	Hiram Scott	5–3			
1969	Hiram Scott	5–4			
1970	Hiram Scott	6–2–1			
Hiram Scott:		26–14–1			
Total:		26–14–1			
