= Floyd Layne =

American basketball player and coach (1929–2024)

- Layne, c. 1950

Personal information
- Born: January 1, 1929 New York City, New York U.S.
- Died: July 29, 2024 (aged 95)
- Listed height: 6 ft 2 in (1.88 m)

Career information
- College: CCNY (1949–1951)
- Playing career: 1954–1963
- Position: Guard

Career history

Playing
- 1954–1956: Carbondale Celtics / Scranton Miners
- 1956–1958: Hazleton Hawks
- 1958–1959: Williamsport Billies
- 1960–1961: Wilkes-Barre Barons
- 1961–1963: Williamsport Billies

Coaching
- 1971–1974: Queensborough CC
- 1974–1988: CCNY

Career highlights
- All-EPBL First Team (1955); All-EPBL Second Team (1956); NCAA champion (1950); NIT champion (1950)

Floyd Layne (January 1, 1929 – July 29, 2024) was an American basketball player and coach. He was part of the historic 1949–50 City College of New York Beavers men's basketball team – the only team to ever win both the NIT and NCAA in the same season. Though later declared innocent, Layne was implicated in the point-shaving scandal in 1951 that ended the golden era of college basketball in New York City. In 1974, after proving his innocence, Layne was appointed head coach of the CCNY basketball team; a role he held for the next 14 years.

Layne was born in Brooklyn, New York on January 1, 1929. He played professionally in the Eastern Professional Basketball League (EPBL) from 1954 to 1963. He was selected to the All-EPBL First Team in 1955 and the Second Team in 1956. He led his team to CBA Finals appearances in 1956–57 (Hazelton) and 1961–62 (Williamsport). Floyd was instrumental in developing Nate Archibald at the Harlem Youth Center. He also served as head coach at Queensborough Community College.

Layne died on July 29, 2024, at the age of 95. He would be the last of the original banned players from the 1950s point-shaving scandal (at least from CCNY's end) to pass away.

== See also ==
- List of people banned or suspended by the NBA
