= Nat Holman =

American basketball player & coach

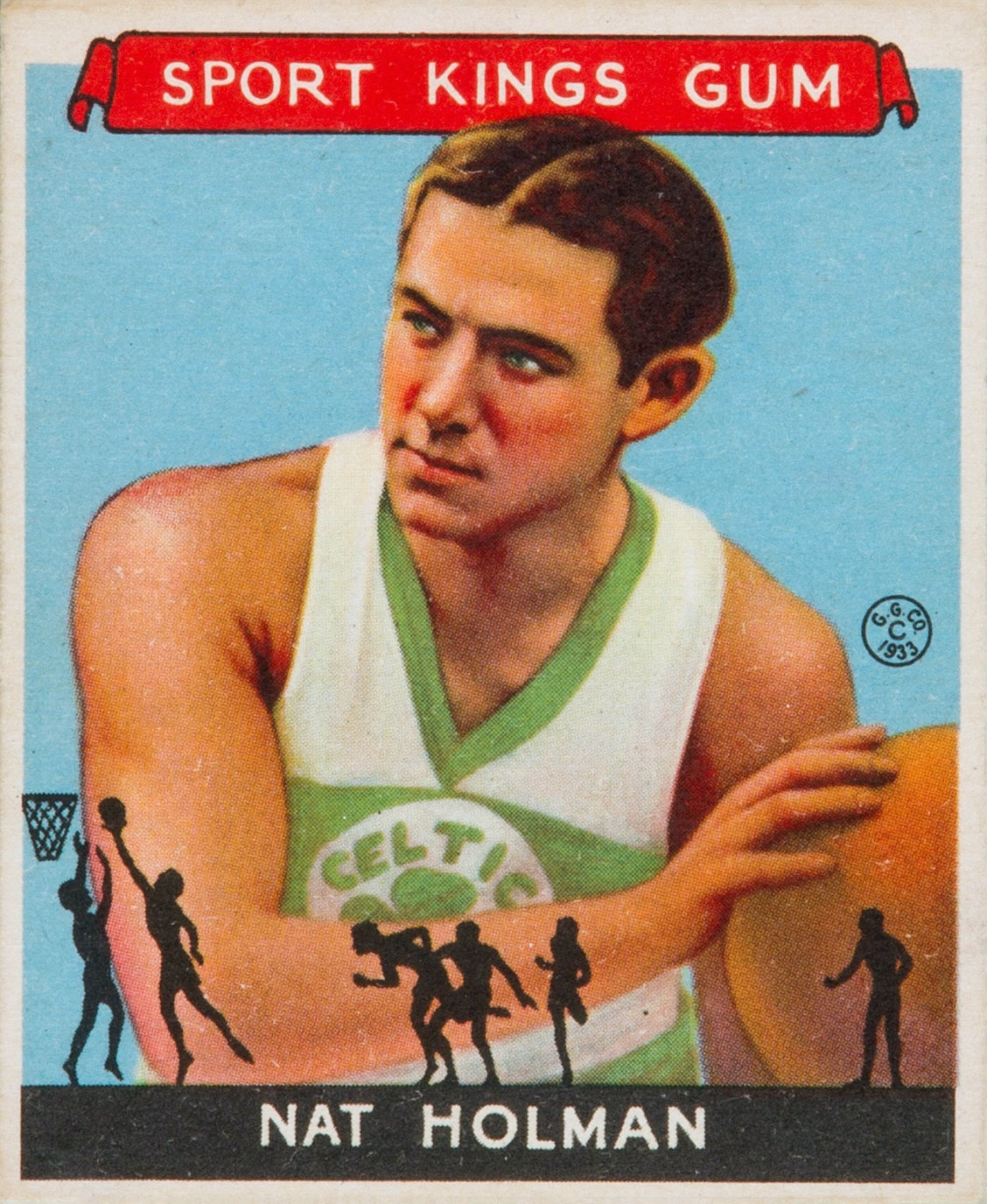
- Nat Holman 1933 Goudey Sport Kings card

Biographical details
- Born: October 19, 1896; New York City, U.S.
- Died: February 12, 1995 (aged 98); Bronx, New York, U.S.
- Education: New York University

Coaching career (HC unless noted)
- 1919–1952: CCNY
- 1954–1956: CCNY
- 1958–1959: CCNY

Head coaching record
- Overall: 421–190
- Tournaments: 4–2 (NCAA Division I); 6–3 (NIT)

Accomplishments and honors

Championships
- NCAA (1950); NIT (1950)
- Basketball Hall of Fame; Inducted in 1964 (profile)

Nat Holman (born Nathan Helmanowich; October 19, 1896 – February 12, 1995) was an American professional basketball player and college coach. He is a member of the Naismith Memorial Basketball Hall of Fame and is the only coach to lead his team to NCAA and National Invitation Tournament (NIT) championships in the same season.

== Early life ==
Holman was born Nathan Helmanowich on the Lower East Side of Manhattan to Russian immigrant parents, and was Jewish. He attended P.S. 62, and was then a star in basketball, soccer, and football at the High School of Commerce, graduated from the Savage School for Physical Education, and earned a master's degree from New York University. Known for his exceptional ball-handling and his accurate shooting, Holman was a star player for the NYU men's basketball team.

== Professional career ==
Holman was also an important player for the Original Celtics, who had no relation to the Boston Celtics.

In 1945, over a decade after he retired from playing professional basketball, Holman would be named a first team member of what was deemed the "All-Time Stars of Professional Basketball", which consisted of votes from the six general managers from the teams playing in the 1944–45 NBL season. Holman was joined alongside two other former Original Celtics players in John Beckman and Dutch Dehnert, as well as the Fort Wayne Zollner Pistons' Bobby McDermott and the Oshkosh All-Stars' Leroy Edwards from the NBL.

== Coaching career ==
Although Holman played professional basketball until 1930, he took over the head coaching position at the City College of New York in 1920. Known as "Mr. Basketball," Holman guided CCNY to the so-called grand slam of college basketball, winning both the NCAA and NIT titles in 1950, a feat that has never been achieved before or since, and is no longer possible as the tournaments now take place concurrently.

In 1951, Holman's CCNY team became involved in a national point-shaving scandal that involved seven different schools. While several CCNY players, including Ed Warner and Ed Roman were arrested, the investigation cleared Holman of any wrongdoing. Despite this, CCNY to suspended Holman after the 1951–52 season. He returned for brief stints in 1954–56 and 1958–59, ultimately retiring in 1959. Holman compiled an overall record of 421–190 in 37 seasons at CCNY. CCNY would go on to drop down to the NCAA Division III in the 1963–64 season.

While relatively untainted by the scandal, Holman was described by author Matthew Goodman as "arrogant and aloof...who somehow developed a British accent" despite his Lower East Side roots.

Holman also founded Camp Scatico in 1921 and ran the camp until he sold it to his niece and her husband in 1964.

Holman wrote two books on basketball technique entitled Scientific Basketball (1922) and Winning Basketball (1932), and his CCNY Beaver teams were lauded as "basketball's version of bebop, like a five-man jazz combo, with each player improvising off a few basic patterns, together creating something fast and complex and unpredictable.' "

In his later years, he lived and died at the Hebrew Home for the Aged in the Riverdale section of the Bronx.

== Legacy ==
Holman was inducted into the Basketball Hall of Fame, the International Jewish Sports Hall of Fame, the New York Basketball Hall of Fame, and the CCNY Hall of Fame. In 1977, the City College of New York renamed a 3,500-seat campus arena for him as the Nat Holman Gymnasium.

Holman, along with future Basketball Hall-of-Famer Barney Sedran, are often credited with the invention of the pick and roll in the early 1920's. This play eventually became the basis for basketball, and is perhaps the most impactful contribution from Nat Holman to the basketball world throughout his entire career. This play was dubbed as "Execution Play No. 8" in his book, "Scientific Basketball".

== Head coaching record ==
Record table
Season	Team	Overall	Conference	Standing	Postseason
CCNY Beavers (Independent) (1919–1933)
1919–20	CCNY	13–3			
1920–21	CCNY	11–4			
1921–22	CCNY	10–2			
1922–23	CCNY	12–1			
1923–24	CCNY	12–1			
1924–25	CCNY	12–2			
1925–26	CCNY	9–5			
1926–27	CCNY	9–3			
1927–28	CCNY	11–4			
1928–29	CCNY	9–5			
1929–30	CCNY	11–3			
1930–31	CCNY	12–4			
1931–32	CCNY	16–1			
1932–33	CCNY	13–1			
CCNY Beavers (Metropolitan New York Conference) (1933–1934)
1933–34	CCNY	14–1	4–1	3rd	
CCNY Beavers (Independent) (1934–1935)
1934–35	CCNY	10–6			
CCNY Beavers (Metropolitan New York Conference) (1935–1939)
1935–36	CCNY	10–4	3–3	5th	
1936–37	CCNY	10–6	3–3	6th	
1937–38	CCNY	14–3	4–2	T–3rd	
1938–39	CCNY	11–6	11–6	6th	
CCNY Beavers (Independent) (1939–1942)
1939–40	CCNY	8–8			
1940–41	CCNY	17–5			NIT Third Place
1941–42	CCNY	16–3			NIT quarterfinal
CCNY Beavers (Metropolitan New York Conference) (1942–1943)
1942–43	CCNY	8–10	2–5	6th	
CCNY Beavers (Independent) (1943–1945)
1943–44	CCNY	6–11			
1944–45	CCNY	12–4			
CCNY Beavers (Metropolitan New York Conference) (1945–1952)
1945–46	CCNY	14–4	4–1	3rd	
1946–47	CCNY	17–6	4–1	2nd	NCAA Final Four
1947–48	CCNY	18–3	4–1	2nd	
1948–49	CCNY	17–8	3–2	T–3rd	NIT quarterfinal
1949–50	CCNY	24–5	6–0	1st	NCAA Champion, NIT Champion
1950–51	CCNY	12–7	2–2	5th	
1951–52	CCNY	8–11	1–5	6th	
CCNY Beavers (Independent) (1954–1956)
1954–55	CCNY				
1955–56	CCNY				
CCNY Beavers (Independent) (1958–1959)
1958–59	CCNY				
CCNY:		405–150 (.730)	51–32 (.614)		
Total:		405–150 (.730)			
National champion Postseason invitational champion Conference regular season champion Conference regular season and conference tournament champion Division regular season champion Division regular season and conference tournament champion Conference tournament champion

== See also ==
- List of select Jewish basketball players
- List of NCAA Division I Men's Final Four appearances by coach
