= CCNY Beavers men's basketball =

CCNY Beavers
- University: City College of New York
- Head coach: Daniel Colon
- Location: New York City, New York
- Arena: Nat Holman Gymnasium (capacity: 2,000)
- Conference: City University of New York Athletic Conference
- Nickname: Beavers
- Colors: Lavender and gray

NCAA Division I tournament champions
- Division I: 1950
Other NCAA Division I tournament results
Final Four	Division I: 1947, 1950
Elite Eight	Division I: 1947, 1950
Appearances	Division I: 1947, 1950; Division III: 1976, 2001, 2003

Conference tournament champions
- CUNYAC: 1966, 1967, 1968, 1971, 1972, 1976, 1977, 1978, 1980, 2001, 2003

The CCNY Beavers men's basketball team is the basketball team that represents City College of New York in New York City, New York, United States. The school's team currently competes in the City University of New York Athletic Conference. In 1950, CCNY became the only school to win both the NCAA Men's Division I Basketball Championship and the National Invitation Tournament in the same season. However, this accomplishment was overshadowed by a point shaving scandal.

== Coaching History ==
No.	Tenure	Coach	Years	Record	Pct.
1	1906–1916	Leonard Palmer	10	71–38	.651
2	1916–1919	Joseph Deering	3	30–10	.750
3	1919–1952; 1954–1956; 1958–1959	Nat Holman	37	423–190	.690
4	1952–1954; 1956–1958; 1959–1963	David Polansky	8	68–69	.496
Totals		4 coaches	58 seasons	593–311	.656
Records updated through end of 1962–63 season Source; *Alum^Promoted from assistant to head coach

== Postseason History ==
=== Division I NCAA ===
In their times in Division I, the Beavers have appeared in two NCAA Tournaments. Their combined record is 4–2.

Year	Round	Opponent	Result
1950	Quarterfinals; Semifinals; Finals	Ohio State; NC State; Bradley	W 56–55; W 78–73; W 71–68
1947	First round Regional semifinal Regional 3rd-place game	Wisconsin; Holy Cross; Texas	W 70–56; L 45–60; L 50–54
