= 1950 NCAA basketball tournament =

Edition of USA college basketball tournament

- Season: 1949–50
- Teams: 8
- Finals site: Madison Square Garden, New York City, New York
- Champions: CCNY Beavers (1st title, 1st title game, 2nd Final Four)
- Runner-up: Bradley Braves (1st title game, 1st Final Four)
- Semifinalists: Baylor Bears (2nd Final Four); NC State Wolfpack (1st Final Four)
- Winning coach: Nat Holman (1st title)
- MOP: Irwin Dambrot (CCNY)
- Attendance: 75,464
- Top scorer: Sam Ranzino (NC State) (75 points)

The 1950 NCAA basketball tournament involved 8 schools playing in single-elimination play to determine the national champion of men's NCAA college basketball. The 12th annual edition of the tournament began on March 23, 1950, and ended with the championship game on March 28, at Madison Square Garden in New York City. A total of 10 games were played, including a third place game in each region and a national third place game.

CCNY, coached by Nat Holman, won the national title with a 71–68 victory in the final game over Bradley, coached by Forddy Anderson. Irwin Dambrot of CCNY was named the tournament's Most Outstanding Player. CCNY became the only team to ever win both the NIT and NCAA tournaments in the same year. Because of participation changes, this currently cannot happen. CCNY is also the only championship team which is not currently a member of Division I. They dropped down to the NCAA College Division in the 1963–64 season. The CCNY point shaving scandal of 1950–51 had hit the program hard, and they had 12 sub-par seasons from 1951–52 through 1962–63 before dropping down to the College Division.

The 1950 tournament was the last tournament to feature eight teams. The field would expand to sixteen teams the next year.

== Locations ==
The following are the sites selected to host each round of the 1950 tournament:

=== Regionals ===
March 23, 24, and 25
East Regional, Madison Square Garden, New York, New York (Host: Metropolitan New York Conference)
March 23 and 25
West Regional, Municipal Auditorium, Kansas City, Missouri (Host: Missouri Valley Conference)

=== Championship Game ===
March 28
Madison Square Garden, New York, New York (Host: Metropolitan New York Conference)

== Teams ==
Region	Team	Coach	Conference	Finished	Final Opponent	Score
East
East	Ohio State	Tippy Dye	Big Ten	Regional third place	Holy Cross	W 72–52
East	Holy Cross	Buster Sheary	Independent	Regional Fourth Place	Ohio State	L 72–52
East	North Carolina State	Everett Case	Southern	Third Place	Baylor	W 53–41
East	CCNY	Nat Holman	Metro NY	Champion	Bradley	W 71–68
West
West	Baylor	Bill Henderson	Southwest	Fourth Place	North Carolina State	L 53–41
West	Bradley	Forddy Anderson	Missouri Valley	Runner Up	CCNY	L 71–68
West	BYU	Stan Watts	Mountain States	Regional third place	UCLA	W 83–62
West	UCLA	John Wooden	Pacific Coast	Regional Fourth Place	BYU	L 83–62

== Bracket ==
Quarterfinals
CCNY	56
Ohio State	55
NC State	87
Holy Cross	74
Baylor	56
BYU	55
Bradley	73
UCLA	59

Semifinals
CCNY	78
NC State	73
Baylor	66
Bradley	68

Finals
CCNY	71
Bradley	68
Third place
NC State	53
Baylor	41

=== Regional third place games ===
East Regional third place
Ohio State	72
Holy Cross	52

West Regional third place
BYU	83
UCLA	62

== See also ==
- 1950 National Invitation Tournament
- 1950 NAIA Basketball Tournament
