= 1950 National Invitation Tournament =

College basketball tournament

- Season: 1949–50
- Teams: 12
- Finals site: Madison Square Garden, New York City
- Champions: CCNY Beavers (1st title)
- Runner-up: Bradley Braves (1st title game)
- Semifinalists: St. John's Red Storm (5th semifinal); Duquesne Dukes (2nd semifinal)
- Winning coach: Nat Holman (1st title)
- MVP: Ed Warner (CCNY)

The 1950 National Invitation Tournament was the 1950 edition of the annual NCAA college basketball competition. For the only time in history, the same school won both the NIT and NCAA tournaments as CCNY took both championships, beating Bradley in both finals. Four participants in the 1950 NIT (Bradley, CCNY, Kentucky and Long Island University) were later implicated in the 1951 college basketball point-shaving scandal.

== Selected teams ==
Below is a list of the 12 teams selected for the tournament.

- Arizona
- Bradley
- CCNY
- Duquesne
- Kentucky
- La Salle
- Long Island
- Niagara
- St. John's
- San Francisco
- Syracuse
- Western Kentucky

== Bracket ==
Below is the tournament bracket.

First round
Western Kentucky	79
Niagara	72
Syracuse	80
Long Island	52
La Salle	72
Arizona	66
CCNY	65
San Francisco	46

Quarterfinals
Western Kentucky	60
St. John's	69
Bradley	78
Syracuse	66
La Salle	47
Duquesne	49
Kentucky	50
CCNY	89

Semifinals
St. John's	72
Bradley	82
Duquesne	52
CCNY	62

Finals
Bradley	61
CCNY	69

Third place game
St. John's	69
Duquesne	67

== See also ==
- 1950 NCAA basketball tournament
- 1950 NAIA Basketball Tournament
