= 1949–50 Penn Quakers men's basketball team =

American college basketball season

1949–50 Penn Quakers men's basketball
- Conference: Eastern Intercollegiate Basketball League
- Record: 11–14 (4–8 EIBL)
- Head coach: Howard Dallmar
- Home arena: The Palestra

1949–50 Eastern Intercollegiate Basketball League standings
	Conf.				Overall
Team	W		L	PCT	W		L	PCT
Princeton	11	–	1	.917	14	–	9	.609
Columbia	9	–	3	.750	21	–	7	.750
Cornell	7	–	5	.583	18	–	7	.720
Yale	7	–	5	.583	17	–	9	.654
Penn	4	–	8	.333	11	–	14	.440
Harvard	3	–	9	.250	9	–	15	.375
Dartmouth	1	–	11	.083	8	–	17	.320
Rankings from AP Poll

The 1949–50 Penn Quakers men's basketball team was a college basketball team that represented the University of Pennsylvania in the 1949–50 NCAA men's basketball season. The Quakers, coached by Howard Dallmar, played in the Eastern Intercollegiate Basketball League and had a 11-14 win–loss record.

== Roster ==
1949–50 Penn Quakers men's basketball team
Players
Coaches

Pos.	#	Name	Height	Weight	Year	Previous school	Hometown
C		Herb Lyon	6 ft 4 in (1.93 m)	—
F		Bob Brooks	5 ft 10 in (1.78 m)	—
F		Paul Fitzpatrick	6 ft 5 in (1.96 m)	—
F		Tom Davis	6 ft 1 in (1.85 m)	—
F		Hugh Jeffries	5 ft 11 in (1.8 m)	—
G		Dick Dougherty	5 ft 9 in (1.75 m)	—
G		Harry Wettlaufer	6 ft 1 in (1.85 m)	—
F		Reds Bagnell	6 ft 0 in (1.83 m)	—
F		Greer Heindel	6 ft 2 in (1.88 m)	—

Head coach

- Howard Dallmar

Assistant coach(es)

Legend

- (C) Team captain
- (S) Suspended
- (I) Ineligible
- (W) Walk-on
- Injured
- Current redshirt
