= 1949–50 Georgia Bulldogs basketball team =

American college basketball season

1949–50 Georgia Bulldogs basketball
- Conference: Southeastern Conference
- Record: 15–9 (6–7 SEC)
- Head coach: Ralph Jordan (4th season; first 6 games); Jim Whatley (1st season; final 18 games)
- Captain: Bob Healey
- Home arena: Woodruff Hall

1949–50 Southeastern Conference men's basketball standings
	Conf.				Overall
Team	W		L	PCT	W		L	PCT
No. 3 Kentucky †	11	–	2	.846	25	–	5	.833
Vanderbilt	11	–	3	.786	17	–	8	.680
Auburn	12	–	6	.667	17	–	7	.708
Tulane	8	–	4	.667	15	–	7	.682
Alabama	8	–	9	.471	9	–	12	.429
Georgia	6	–	7	.462	15	–	9	.625
Tennessee	5	–	6	.455	15	–	11	.577
Georgia Tech	7	–	9	.438	14	–	13	.519
LSU	5	–	8	.385	13	–	12	.520
Mississippi State	6	–	10	.375	7	–	11	.389
Florida	4	–	10	.286	9	–	14	.391
Ole Miss	4	–	13	.235	8	–	17	.320
† 1950 SEC Tournament winner Rankings from AP Poll

The 1949–50 Georgia Bulldogs basketball team represented the University of Georgia as a member of the Southeastern Conference (SEC) during the 1949–50 NCAA men's basketball season. Led by Ralph Jordan for the first six games of the season and then Jim Whatley for the remainder of the year, the Bulldogs compiled an overall record of 15–9 with a mark of 6–7 conference play, placing sixth in the SEC. The team captain was Bob Healey.

== Roster ==
1949–50 Georgia Bulldogs men's basketball team
Players
Coaches

Pos.	#	Name	Height	Weight	Year	Previous school	Hometown
C		Bob Schloss	6 ft 8 in (2.03 m)	—	Jr
F		Bob Healey	6 ft 2 in (1.88 m)	—	Sr
F		Earl Davis	6 ft 2 in (1.88 m)	—	Jr
G		Joe Jordan	5 ft 9 in (1.75 m)	—	Jr
G		E.L. Rainey	6 ft 0 in (1.83 m)	—	Sr
G		Jim Umbricht	6 ft 4 in (1.93 m)	—
F		Charles Bryant	6 ft 3 in (1.91 m)	—
G		Minton Williams	6 ft 0 in (1.83 m)	—
C		Louis Christo	6 ft 3 in (1.91 m)	—
F		Dick Thomas	6 ft 0 in (1.83 m)	—	Jr
F		Sonny Dykes	6 ft 0 in (1.83 m)	—
G		Ryle Tatum	6 ft 0 in (1.83 m)	—
F		_ Haskins	6 ft 0 in (1.83 m)	—
G		Lonnie O'Quinn	—	—
C		Bill Pennland	6 ft 5 in (1.96 m)	—

Head coach

Ralph Jordan

Assistant coach(es)

Legend

- (C) Team captain
- (S) Suspended
- (I) Ineligible
- (W) Walk-on
- Injured
- Current redshirt

== Schedule ==
Date time, TV	Opponent	Result	Record	Site city, state
12/2/1949	Chattanooga	W 69-48	1–0	Athens, GA
12/3/1949	Clemson	W 59-40	2–0	Athens, GA
12/6/1949	at Clemson	W 65-57	3–0	
12/9/1949	at Mississippi State	L 40-51	3–1	
12/10/1949	at Alabama	L 38-53	3–2	
12/17/1949	South Carolina	W 77-62	4–2	Athens, GA
1/7/1950	Mississippi	W 70-52	5–2	Athens, GA
1/11/1950	Mercer	W 63-57	6–2	Athens, GA
1/14/1950	at South Carolina	L 43-54	6–3	
1/17/1950	Kentucky	W 71-60	7–3	Athens, GA
1/20/1950	at Florida	L 49-54	7–4	
1/21/1950	at Florida	W 57-48	8–4	
1/25/1950	Georgia Tech	W 67-55	9–4	Athens, GA
1/28/1950	at Kentucky	L 56-88	9–5	
2/1/1950	at Georgia Tech	L 51-56	9–6	
2/4/1950	at Chattanooga	W 64-56	10–6	
2/9/1950	at Auburn	L 54-67	10–7	
2/11/1950	Florida	W 77-52	11–7	Athens, GA
2/15/1950	Georgia Tech	W 73-72	12–7	Athens, GA
2/20/1950	at Mercer	W 69-60	13–7	
2/25/1950	Auburn	L 46-55	13–8	Athens, GA
3/2/1950	Mississippi	W 59-58	14–8	Athens, GA
3/3/1950	Alabama	W 52-51	15–8	Athens, GA
3/4/1950	Kentucky	L 63-79	15–9	Athens, GA
*Non-conference game. (#) Tournament seedings in parentheses.
