= 1950 Southern Conference men's basketball tournament =

- Classification: Division I
- Season: 1949–50
- Teams: 8
- Site: Duke Indoor Stadium; Durham, NC
- Champions: North Carolina State (5th title)
- Winning coach: Everett Case (4th title)

1949–50 Southern Conference men's basketball standings
	Conf.				Overall
Team	W		L	PCT	W		L	PCT
No. 5 NC State †	12	–	2	.857	27	–	6	.818
William & Mary	12	–	4	.750	23	–	9	.719
George Washington	12	–	4	.750	17	–	8	.680
South Carolina	12	–	5	.706	13	–	9	.591
North Carolina	13	–	6	.684	17	–	12	.586
Virginia Tech	9	–	5	.643	16	–	9	.640
Wake Forest	11	–	8	.579	14	–	16	.467
Duke	9	–	7	.563	15	–	15	.500
Clemson	8	–	8	.500	10	–	10	.500
Davidson	6	–	12	.333	10	–	16	.385
Furman	4	–	8	.333	9	–	12	.429
Washington and Lee	4	–	9	.308	8	–	12	.400
Maryland	5	–	13	.278	7	–	18	.280
Richmond	4	–	13	.235	8	–	16	.333
The Citadel	2	–	10	.167	4	–	16	.200
VMI	2	–	11	.154	4	–	17	.190
† 1950 Southern Conference tournament winner As of April 30, 1950; Rankings from AP Poll

The 1950 Southern Conference men's basketball tournament took place from March 1–3, 1950 at the Duke Indoor Stadium in Durham, North Carolina. The North Carolina State Wolfpack, led by head coach Everett Case, won their fifth Southern Conference title and received the automatic berth to the 1950 NCAA tournament.

== Format ==
The top eight finishers of the conference's seventeen members were eligible for the tournament. Teams were seeded based on conference winning percentage. The tournament used a preset bracket consisting of three rounds.

== Bracket ==
Quarterfinals; March 1
1	#8 NC State	67
6	Virginia Tech	42
3	George Washington	61
7	Wake Forest	65
2	William & Mary	50
5	North Carolina	47
4	South Carolina	41
8	Duke	53

Semifinals; March 2
1	#8 NC State	59
7	Wake Forest	53
2	William & Mary	50
8	Duke	60

Finals; March 3
1	#8 NC State	67
8	Duke	47

* Overtime game

== See also ==
- List of Southern Conference men's basketball champions
