= 1949–50 Iowa State Cyclones men's basketball team =

American college basketball season

1949–50 Iowa State Cyclones men's basketball
- Conference: Big Seven Conference
- Record: 6–17 (2–10 Big Seven)
- Head coach: Clay Sutherland (3rd season)
- Home arena: Iowa State Armory

1949–50 Big Seven Conference men's basketball standings
	Conf.				Overall
Team	W		L	PCT	W		L	PCT
No. 14 Kansas State	8	–	4	.667	17	–	7	.708
Nebraska	8	–	4	.667	16	–	7	.696
No. 19 Kansas	8	–	4	.667	14	–	11	.560
Colorado	6	–	6	.500	14	–	8	.636
Oklahoma	6	–	6	.500	12	–	10	.545
Missouri	4	–	8	.333	14	–	10	.583
Iowa State	2	–	10	.167	6	–	17	.261
Rankings from AP Poll

The 1949–50 Iowa State Cyclones men's basketball team represented Iowa State University during the 1949–50 NCAA men's basketball season. The Cyclones were coached by Clay Sutherland, who was in his third season with the Cyclones. They played their home games at the Iowa State Armory in Ames, Iowa.

They finished the season 6–17, 2–10 in Big Seven play to finish in seventh place.

== Roster ==
1949–50 Iowa State Cyclones men's basketball team
Players
Coaches

Pos.	#	Name	Height	Weight	Year	Hometown
F		Gay Anderson	6 ft 5 in (1.96 m)	—	Jr	Council Bluffs, Iowa
F		Eldon Clement	6 ft 2 in (1.88 m)	—		Le Mars, Iowa
C		Gordon Dunker	6 ft 4 in (1.93 m)	—
G		Don Ferguson	5 ft 7 in (1.7 m)	—	Sr	Ottumwa, Iowa
G		Charles Herbert	6 ft 4 in (1.93 m)	—
G		Bud Jorgensen	6 ft 2 in (1.88 m)	—
G		Bob Koch	5 ft 9 in (1.75 m)	—
G		Jack Luhrig	6 ft 3 in (1.91 m)	—		Sheldon, Iowa
F		Bob McLuen	6 ft 1 in (1.85 m)	—	Sr
G		Gene Paetz	5 ft 10 in (1.78 m)	—
F		Don Paulsen (C)	6 ft 4 in (1.93 m)	—	Sr
G		Dudley Ruisch	6 ft 4 in (1.93 m)	—	Sr
F		Jim Stange	6 ft 7 in (2.01 m)	—		Davenport, Iowa
F		Frank Voight	6 ft 3 in (1.91 m)	—
C		Sylvester Wilhelmi	6 ft 5 in (1.96 m)	—		Le Mars, Iowa
G		Dan Youngblade	6 ft 3 in (1.91 m)	—		Sioux City, Iowa

Head coach

- Clay Sutherland

Assistant coach(es)

Legend

- (C) Team captain
- (S) Suspended
- (I) Ineligible
- (W) Walk-on
- Injured
- Current redshirt

== Schedule and results ==
Date time, TV	Rank^{#}	Opponent^{#}	Result	Record	Site city, state
Regular season
December 3, 1949*; 7:30 pm		Luther	W 49–39	1–0	Iowa State Armory; Ames, Iowa
December 5, 1949*; 7:30 pm		Grinnell	W 70–59	2–0	Iowa State Armory; Ames, Iowa
December 8, 1949*; 8:15 pm		at Bradley	L 48–56	2–1	Robertson Memorial Field House; Peoria, Illinois
December 10, 1949*; 7:30 pm		Drake; Iowa Big Four	W 64–58	3–1	Iowa State Armory; Ames, Iowa
December 17, 1949*; 8:00 pm, WTCN		at No. 10 Minnesota	L 54–67	3–2	Williams Arena; Minneapolis, Minnesota
December 19, 1949*; 7:30 pm		Northwestern	W 64–54	4–2	Iowa State Armory; Ames, Iowa
December 20, 1949*; 7:30 pm		Idaho	L 39–41	4–3	Iowa State Armory; Ames, Iowa
December 23, 1949*; 8:15 pm		at Drake; Iowa Big Four	L 38–39	4–4	Drake Fieldhouse; Des Moines, Iowa
December 27, 1949*; 8:00 pm		vs. No. 17 Oklahoma; Big Seven Holiday Tournament Quarterfinals	L 57–66	4–5	Municipal Auditorium; Kansas City, Missouri
December 29, 1949*; 2:00 pm		vs. Kansas; Big Seven Holiday Tournament Consolation Semifinals	L 43–64	4–6	Municipal Auditorium; Kansas City, Missouri
December 30, 1949*; 2:00 pm		vs. Nebraska; Big Seven Holiday Tournament Seventh Place	L 67–85 ^{OT}	4–7	Municipal Auditorium; Kansas City, Missouri
January 7, 1950; 7:30 pm		Colorado	W 50–40	5–7 (1–0)	Iowa State Armory; Ames, Iowa
January 14, 1950; 7:30 pm		at Nebraska	L 46–64	5–8 (1–1)	Nebraska Coliseum; Lincoln, Nebraska
January 16, 1950; 8:00 pm		at Kansas State	L 57–99	5–9 (1–2)	Nichols Hall; Manhattan, Kansas
January 21, 1950; 7:30 pm		Missouri	W 61–49	6–9 (2–2)	Iowa State Armory; Ames, Iowa
January 27, 1950; 7:30 pm		at Kansas	L 42–67	6–10 (2–3)	Hoch Auditorium; Lawrence, Kansas
February 6, 1950; 7:30 pm		Oklahoma	L 57–63	6–11 (2–4)	Iowa State Armory; Ames, Iowa
February 10, 1950		at Colorado	L 46–66	6–12 (2–5)	Balch Fieldhouse; Boulder, Colorado
February 17, 1950; 7:30 pm		No. 14 Kansas State	L 56–80	6–13 (2–6)	Iowa State Armory; Ames, Iowa
February 20, 1950; 8:00 pm		at Oklahoma	L 48–76	6–14 (2–7)	OU Field House; Norman, Oklahoma
February 25, 1950; 7:30 pm		Nebraska	L 54–56 ^{OT}	6–15 (2–8)	Iowa State Armory; Ames, Iowa
March 3, 1950; 7:30 pm, WOI (delay)		Kansas	L 52–66	6–16 (2–9)	Iowa State Armory; Ames, Iowa
March 6, 1950; 8:00 pm		at Missouri	L 59–74	6–17 (2–10)	Brewer Fieldhouse; Columbia, Missouri
*Non-conference game. ^{#}Rankings from AP poll. (#) Tournament seedings in parentheses. All times are in Central Time.
