= 2010–11 Kentucky Wildcats women's basketball team =

Intercollegiate basketball season

2010–11 Kentucky Wildcats women's basketball

NCAA Tournament 4 Seed, Second Round
- Conference: Southeastern Conference

Ranking
- Coaches: No. 22
- AP: No. 17
- Record: 25–9 (11–5 SEC)
- Head coach: Matthew Mitchell (Fourth season)
- Assistant coaches: Kyra Elzy (Third season); Matt Insell (Third season); Shalon Pillow (Second season)
- Home arena: Memorial Coliseum (Capacity: 8,500)

2010–11 SEC women's basketball standings
	Conf.				Overall
Team	W		L	PCT	W		L	PCT
No. 4 Tennessee^{†}	16	–	0	1.000	34	–	3	.919
No. 17 Kentucky	11	–	5	.688	25	–	9	.735
Vanderbilt	10	–	6	.625	20	–	12	.625
Georgia	10	–	6	.625	23	–	11	.676
South Carolina	8	–	8	.500	18	–	15	.545
Auburn	8	–	8	.500	16	–	16	.500
LSU	8	–	8	.500	19	–	13	.594
Florida	7	–	9	.438	20	–	15	.571
Arkansas	6	–	10	.375	22	–	12	.647
Alabama	5	–	11	.313	18	–	15	.545
Mississippi State	4	–	12	.250	13	–	17	.433
Ole Miss	3	–	13	.188	10	–	19	.345
† 2011 SEC tournament winner Rankings from AP poll

The 2010–11 Kentucky Wildcats women's basketball team represented the University of Kentucky in the 2010–11 NCAA Division I women's basketball season. The Wildcats, coached by Matthew Mitchell, were a member of the Southeastern Conference, and played their home games on campus at Memorial Coliseum—unlike UK's famous men's program, which plays off-campus at Rupp Arena in downtown Lexington.

== Pre-season outlook ==
Kentucky was picked by the league's coaches to finish second in the SEC behind Tennessee. Victoria Dunlap, a 6'1 forward from Nashville, Tennessee, entered her senior season as one of the most decorated players in UK Hoops history. She was named the 2010 Southeastern Conference Player of the Year by The Associated Press and the league's coaches, and was one of the 10 State Farm All-Americans named by the Women's Basketball Coaches Association the year before, becoming UK's first All-American since Valerie Still in 1983. She was also on the Wade Trophy watch list awarded to the nation's top player. Dunlap was also picked to repeat as SEC Player of the Year by the league coaches, with eight of twelve votes. Sophomore guard A'dia Mathies made the All-SEC first team. The Lady Wildcats also had a large freshman class and Carly Marrow, a returning senior, was predicted to add experience to a young second string.

== 2010–11 roster ==
From the official UK women's basketball site:

#	Name	Height	Position	Class	Hometown	Previous Team(s)
Scholarship Players
0	Jennifer O'Neill	5'6"	G	Fr.	Bronx, New York	Saint Michael Academy
1	A'dia Mathies	5'9"	G	So.	Louisville, Kentucky	Iroquois HS
3	Chrystal Riley	5'5"	G	Jr.	Memphis, Tennessee	Hillcrest HS/LSU
4	Keyla Snowden	5'7"	G	Jr.	Lexington, Kentucky	Lexington Catholic/Akron
5	Carly Morrow	5'10"	G	Sr.	Lookout Mountain, Georgia	Chattanooga Girls Prep School
10	Bernisha Pinkett	5'7"	G	So.	Washington, District of Columbia	Howard D. Woodson HS
11	Sarah Beth Barnette	6'2"	F	Fr.	Lexington, Kentucky	Lexington Christian Academy
20	Maegan Conwright	5'8"	G	Fr.	Arlington, Texas	Timberview HS
24	Amber Smith	5'6"	G	Sr.	Winter Haven, Florida	Winter Haven HS
31	Samantha Drake	6'3"	C	Fr.	Bardstown, Kentucky	Nelson County HS
32	Kastine Evans	5'8"	G	Fr.	Salem, Connecticut	Norwich Free Academy
34	Victoria Dunlap	6'1"	F	Sr.	Nashville, Tennessee	Brentwood Academy
40	Brittany Henderson	6'2"	F	Fr.	Pasadena, California	John Muir High School

== 2010–11 schedule ==
Date time, TV	Rank^{#}	Opponent^{#}	Result	Record	Site (attendance) city, state
Exhibition
November 7*; 7:00 pm	No. 10	Morehead State	W 99–55		Memorial Coliseum (–); Lexington, Kentucky
Non-conference regular season
November 12*; 11:00 am	No. 10	Morehead State	W 82–48	1–0	Memorial Coliseum (6,793); Lexington, Kentucky
November 14*; 2:00 pm	No. 10	at Miami (OH)	W 84–71	2–0	Millett Hall (1,235); Oxford, Ohio
November 21*; 2:00 pm, FSN South	No. 10	No. 12 Notre Dame	W 81–76	3–0	Memorial Coliseum (6,794); Lexington, Kentucky
November 26*; 8:30 pm	No. 9	vs. Murray State	W 91–59	4–0	Reed Green Coliseum (1,178); Hattiesburg, Mississippi
November 27*; 5:30 pm	No. 9	at Southern Miss	W 79–60	5–0	Reed Green Coliseum (1,211); Hattiesburg, Mississippi
December 5*; 2:00 pm, WAZOO	No. 9	at Louisville	L 52–78	5–1	KFC Yum! Center (22,152); Louisville, Kentucky
December 7*; 6:00 pm, FSN South	No. 14	Tennessee Tech	W 77–53	6–1	Memorial Coliseum (4,393); Lexington, Kentucky
December 11*; 6:00 pm	No. 14	at Chattanooga	W 79–64	7–1	McKenzie Arena (3,139); Chattanooga, Tennessee
December 18*; 2:00 pm	No. 13	Alabama A&M	W 84–58	8–1	Memorial Coliseum (6,124); Lexington, Kentucky
December 21*; 7:00 pm	No. 11	Arkansas-Pine Bluff	W 107–35	9–1	Memorial Coliseum (5,784); Lexington, Kentucky
December 29*; 6:00 pm, FSN South	No. 11	Middle Tennessee	W 81–72	10–1	Memorial Coliseum (6,625); Lexington, Kentucky
December 30*; 6:00 pm, FSN South	No. 11	Tennessee-Martin	W 68–47	11–1	Memorial Coliseum (6,175); Lexington, Kentucky
January 4*; 7:00 pm, ESPNU	No. 10	at No. 3 Duke	L 48–54	11–2	Cameron Indoor Stadium (5,314); Durham, North Carolina
SEC Regular Season
January 6; 8:00 pm	No. 10	at No. 25 Arkansas	L 67–78	11–3 (0–1)	Bud Walton Arena (1,820); Fayetteville, Arkansas
January 9; 2:00 pm, ESPNU	No. 10	Georgia	L 59–61	11–4 (0–2)	Memorial Coliseum (6,353); Lexington, Kentucky
January 13; 7:00 pm	No. 19	South Carolina	W 66–48	12–4 (1–2)	Memorial Coliseum (5,730); Lexington, Kentucky
January 16; 1:00 pm, FSN South	No. 19	Mississippi State	W 72–60	13–4 (2–2)	Memorial Coliseum (6,133); Lexington, Kentucky
January 20; 7:00 pm	No. 19	at Florida	W 59–58	14–4 (3–2)	O'Connell Center (1,863); Gainesville, Florida
January 23; 4:00 pm, ESPNU	No. 19	Vanderbilt	W 78–68	15–4 (4–2)	Memorial Coliseum (7,104); Lexington, Kentucky
January 27; 9:00 pm, FSN South	No. 18	at Ole Miss	L 59–61	16–4 (5–2)	Tad Smith Coliseum (476); Oxford, Mississippi
January 30; 2:00 pm	No. 18	at Alabama	W 82–69	17–4 (6–2)	Coleman Coliseum (1,747); Tuscaloosa, Alabama
February 3; 7:00 pm	No. 18	Auburn	W 69–38	18–4 (7–2)	Memorial Coliseum (6,003); Lexington, Kentucky
February 7; 9:00 pm, ESPN2	No. 15	No. 4 Tennessee; Rivalry	L 67–73	18–4 (7–3)	Memorial Coliseum (7,126); Lexington, Kentucky
February 10; 7:00 pm	No. 15	at South Carolina	L 61–66	18–5 (7–4)	Colonial Life Arena (2,764); Columbia, South Carolina
February 13; 2:30 pm, ESPN2	No. 15	LSU	W 49–47	19–5 (8–4)	Memorial Coliseum (7,646); Lexington, Kentucky
February 17; 7:00 pm, FSN South	No. 19	at Georgia	W 69–51	19–6 (8–5)	Stegeman Coliseum (3,060); Athens, Georgia
February 20; 2:00 pm	No. 19	at Vanderbilt	W 80–71	20–6 (9–5)	Memorial Gym (5,372); Nashville, Tennessee
February 24; 6:00 pm, FSN South	No. 20	Arkansas	W 55–54	21–6 (10–5)	Memorial Coliseum (6,670); Lexington, Kentucky
February 27; 2:00 pm	No. 20	at Auburn	W 76–62	22–6 (11–5)	Auburn Arena (3,274); Auburn, Alabama
SEC Tournament
March 4; 3:30 pm, FSN	No. 16	vs. LSU; 2011 SEC tournament Quarterfinals	W 60–58	23–6 (11–5)	Bridgestone Arena (7,461); Nashville, Tennessee
March 5; 6:30 pm, ESPNU	No. 16	vs. Vanderbilt; 2011 SEC tournament Semifinals	W 69–56	24–6 (11–5)	Bridgestone Arena (10,207); Nashville, Tennessee
March 6; 5:30 pm, ESPN2	No. 16	vs. No. 4 Tennessee; 2011 SEC tournament Finals / Rivalry	L 65–90	24–7 (11–5)	Bridgestone Arena (11,150); Nashville, Tennessee
NCAA Tournament
March 19; 4:40 pm, ESPN2	No. (4)	vs. No. (13) Hampton; 2011 NCAA tournament First Round	W 66–62 ^{OT}	25–7 (11–5)	The Pit (2,278); Albuquerque, New Mexico
March 21; 7:45 pm, ESPN2	No. (4)	vs. No. (5) North Carolina; 2011 NCAA tournament First Round	L 74–86	25–8 (11–5)	The Pit (1,877); Albuquerque, New Mexico
*Non-conference game. ^{#}Rankings from AP Poll. (#) Tournament seedings in parentheses. All times are in Eastern Time.
