= 1949–50 NCAA men's basketball season =

Men's collegiate basketball season

- Preseason AP No. 1: None
- NCAA Tournament: 1950
- Tournament dates: March 23 – 28, 1950
- National Championship: Madison Square Garden; New York City, New York
- NCAA Champions: CCNY Beavers
- Helms National Champions: CCNY Beavers
- Other champions: CCNY Beavers (NIT)
- Player of the Year (Helms): Paul Arizin, Villanova Wildcats

The 1949–50 NCAA men's basketball season began in December 1949, progressed through the regular season and conference tournaments, and concluded with the 1950 NCAA basketball tournament championship game on March 28, 1950, at Madison Square Garden in New York, New York. The City College of New York Beavers won their first NCAA national championship with a 71–68 victory over the Bradley Braves.

== Season headlines ==
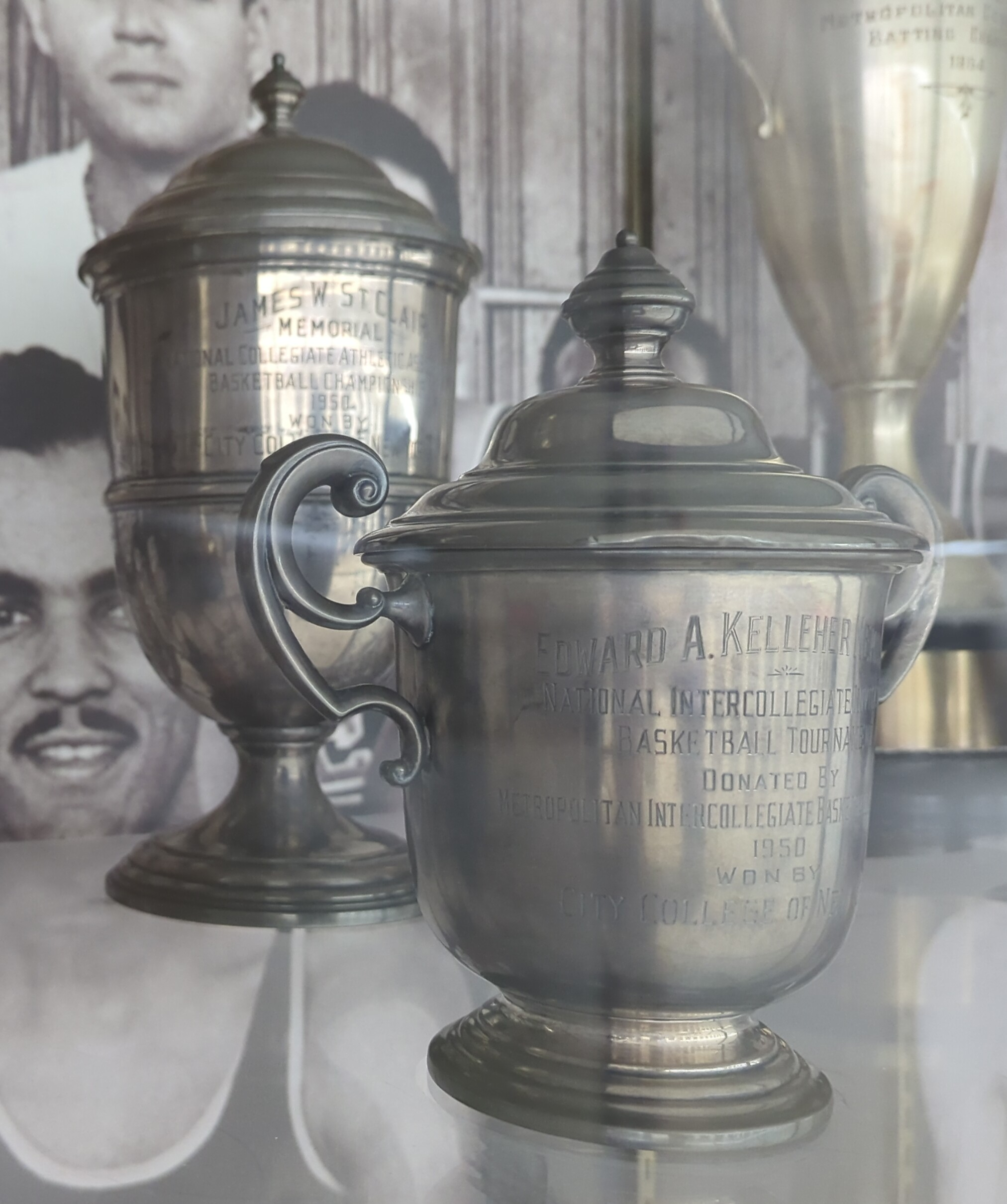
CCNY's championship trophies for the 1949–50 season: The James W. St. Clair Memorial Trophy for the 1950 NCAA Tournament (left) and the Edward A. Kelleher Memorial Trophy for the 1950 National Invitation Tournament (right).

- CCNY became the only team ever to win both the NCAA tournament and the National Invitation Tournament in the same season. CCNY defeated Bradley in the championship game of both tournaments.
- Winning the NCAA championship game in New York City, CCNY became the first school to win the NCAA championship in its home city.
- CCNY became the first NCAA championship team to have an integrated roster of white and African American players, starting three African Americans.
- Although the Border Conference did not play as a major conference during the season, conference member Arizona was ranked No. 15 in the final AP Poll of the season.

== Conference membership changes ==
School	Former conference	New conference
Brooklyn Bulldogs	Metropolitan New York Conference	Non-major basketball program
Bucknell Bison	Middle Atlantic States Conference North	Independent
Detroit Titans	Independent	Missouri Valley Conference
Gettysburg Bullets	Middle Atlantic States Conference North	Independent
Lafayette Leopards	Middle Atlantic States Conference North	Independent
Lehigh Engineers	Middle Atlantic States Conference North	Independent
Louisville Cardinals	Ohio Valley Conference	Independent
Muhlenberg Mules	Middle Atlantic States Conference North	Independent

== Regular season ==
=== Conferences ===
==== Conference winners and tournaments ====
Conference	Regular season winner	Conference player of the year	Conference tournament	Tournament venue (City)	Tournament winner
Big Seven Conference	Kansas, Kansas State, & Nebraska	None selected	No Tournament		
Big Ten Conference	Ohio State	None selected	No Tournament		
Eastern Intercollegiate Basketball League	Princeton	None selected	No Tournament		
Metropolitan New York Conference	CCNY		No Tournament		
Mid-American Conference	Cincinnati	None selected	No Tournament		
Missouri Valley Conference	Bradley	None selected	No Tournament		
Mountain States (Skyline) Conference	BYU		No Tournament		
Ohio Valley Conference	Western Kentucky State	None selected	1950 Ohio Valley Conference men's basketball tournament	Jefferson County Armory (Louisville, Kentucky)	Eastern Kentucky State
Pacific Coast Conference	Washington State (North); UCLA (South)		No Tournament; UCLA defeated Washington State in best-of-three conference championship playoff series		
Southeastern Conference	Kentucky	None selected	1950 SEC men's basketball tournament	Jefferson County Armory, (Louisville, Kentucky)	Kentucky
Southern Conference	NC State	None selected	1950 Southern Conference men's basketball tournament	Duke Indoor Stadium (Durham, North Carolina)	NC State
Southwest Conference	Arkansas & Baylor	None selected	No Tournament		
Western New York Little Three Conference	Canisius, Niagara, & St. Bonaventure		No Tournament		
Yankee Conference	Rhode Island State	None selected	No Tournament		

==== Conference standings ====
1949–50 Big Seven Conference men's basketball standings
	Conf.				Overall
Team	W		L	PCT	W		L	PCT
No. 14 Kansas State	8	–	4	.667	17	–	7	.708
Nebraska	8	–	4	.667	16	–	7	.696
No. 19 Kansas	8	–	4	.667	14	–	11	.560
Colorado	6	–	6	.500	14	–	8	.636
Oklahoma	6	–	6	.500	12	–	10	.545
Missouri	4	–	8	.333	14	–	10	.583
Iowa State	2	–	10	.167	6	–	17	.261
Rankings from AP Poll

1949–50 Big Nine Conference men's basketball standings
	Conf.				Overall
Team	W		L	PCT	W		L	PCT
No. 2 Ohio State	11	–	1	.917	22	–	4	.846
No. 16 Wisconsin	9	–	3	.750	17	–	5	.773
No. 20 Indiana	7	–	5	.583	17	–	5	.773
Illinois	7	–	5	.583	14	–	8	.636
Iowa	6	–	6	.500	15	–	7	.682
Minnesota	4	–	8	.333	13	–	9	.591
Michigan	4	–	8	.333	11	–	11	.500
Northwestern	3	–	9	.250	10	–	12	.455
Purdue	3	–	9	.250	9	–	13	.409
Rankings from AP Poll

1949–50 Eastern Intercollegiate Basketball League standings
	Conf.				Overall
Team	W		L	PCT	W		L	PCT
Princeton	11	–	1	.917	14	–	9	.609
Columbia	9	–	3	.750	21	–	7	.750
Cornell	7	–	5	.583	18	–	7	.720
Yale	7	–	5	.583	17	–	9	.654
Pennsylvania	4	–	8	.333	11	–	14	.440
Harvard	3	–	9	.250	9	–	15	.375
Dartmouth	1	–	11	.083	8	–	17	.320
Rankings from AP Poll

1949–50 Metropolitan New York Conference men's basketball standings
	Conf.				Overall
Team	W		L	PCT	W		L	PCT
CCNY	6	–	0	1.000	24	–	5	.828
Fordham	3	–	2	.600	15	–	12	.556
Brooklyn	2	–	2	.500	24	–	5	.828
No. 9 St. John's	3	–	3	.500	24	–	5	.828
Manhattan	3	–	3	.500	14	–	11	.560
NYU	1	–	4	.200	8	–	11	.421
St. Francis (NY)	0	–	4	.000	8	–	18	.308
Rankings from AP Poll

1949–50 Mid-American Conference men's basketball standings
	Conf.				Overall
Team	W		L	PCT	W		L	PCT
Cincinnati	10	–	0	1.000	20	–	6	.769
Western Michigan	6	–	4	.600	12	–	10	.545
Butler	6	–	4	.600	12	–	12	.500
Ohio	3	–	7	.300	6	–	14	.300
Miami (Ohio)	3	–	7	.300	5	–	15	.250
Western Reserve	2	–	6	.250	7	–	17	.292
Rankings from AP Poll

1949–50 Missouri Valley Conference men's basketball standings
	Conf.				Overall
Team	W		L	PCT	W		L	PCT
No. 1 Bradley	11	–	1	.917	32	–	5	.865
Saint Louis	8	–	4	.667	17	–	9	.654
Detroit	7	–	5	.583	20	–	6	.769
Oklahoma A&M	7	–	5	.583	18	–	9	.667
Drake	5	–	7	.417	14	–	12	.538
Tulsa	3	–	9	.250	12	–	11	.522
Wichita Municipal	1	–	11	.083	7	–	17	.292
Rankings from AP Poll

1949–50 Mountain States Conference men's basketball standings
	Conf.				Overall
Team	W		L	PCT	W		L	PCT
BYU	14	–	6	.700	22	–	12	.647
Wyoming	13	–	7	.650	25	–	11	.694
Denver	13	–	7	.650	18	–	13	.581
Utah State	10	–	10	.500	17	–	17	.500
Utah	8	–	12	.400	16	–	18	.471
Colorado State	2	–	18	.100	7	–	23	.233
Rankings from AP Poll

1949–50 Ohio Valley Conference men's basketball standings
	Conf.				Overall
Team	W		L	PCT	W		L	PCT
No. 8 Western Kentucky State		–		–	25	–	6	.806
Eastern Kentucky State†		–		–	16	–	6	.727
Marshall		–		–	15	–	9	.625
Morehead State		–		–	12	–	10	.545
Murray State		–		–	18	–	13	.581
Evansville		–		–	14	–	14	.500
Tennessee Tech		–		–	9	–	12	.429
† Ohio Valley Conference Tournament winner Rankings from AP Poll

1949–50 Pacific Coast Conference men's basketball standings
	Conf.				Overall
Team	W		L	PCT	W		L	PCT
North
No. 18 Washington State	11	–	5	.688	19	–	13	.594
Washington	8	–	8	.500	19	–	10	.655
Oregon State	8	–	8	.500	13	–	14	.481
Idaho	7	–	9	.438	15	–	17	.469
Oregon	6	–	10	.375	9	–	19	.321
South
No. 7 UCLA †	10	–	2	.833	24	–	7	.774
USC	7	–	5	.583	16	–	8	.667
California	4	–	8	.333	10	–	17	.370
Stanford	3	–	9	.250	11	–	14	.440
† Conference playoff series winner As of 1950; Rankings from AP Poll

1949–50 Rocky Mountain Conference men's basketball standings
	Conf.				Overall
Team	W		L	PCT	W		L	PCT
Montana State	9	–	1	.900	20	–	12	.625
Colorado State–Greeley	8	–	2	.800	13	–	8	.619
Colorado College	5	–	4	.556	9	–	16	.360
Western State (CO)	5	–	5	.500	15	–	10	.600
Idaho State	1	–	8	.111	5	–	25	.167
Colorado Mines	1	–	9	.100	7	–	18	.280

1949–50 Southeastern Conference men's basketball standings
	Conf.				Overall
Team	W		L	PCT	W		L	PCT
No. 3 Kentucky †	11	–	2	.846	25	–	5	.833
Vanderbilt	11	–	3	.786	17	–	8	.680
Auburn	12	–	6	.667	17	–	7	.708
Tulane	8	–	4	.667	15	–	7	.682
Alabama	8	–	9	.471	9	–	12	.429
Georgia	6	–	7	.462	15	–	9	.625
Tennessee	5	–	6	.455	15	–	11	.577
Georgia Tech	7	–	9	.438	14	–	13	.519
LSU	5	–	8	.385	13	–	12	.520
Mississippi State	6	–	10	.375	7	–	11	.389
Florida	4	–	10	.286	9	–	14	.391
Ole Miss	4	–	13	.235	8	–	17	.320
† 1950 SEC Tournament winner Rankings from AP Poll

1949–50 Southern Conference men's basketball standings
	Conf.				Overall
Team	W		L	PCT	W		L	PCT
No. 5 NC State †	12	–	2	.857	27	–	6	.818
William & Mary	12	–	4	.750	23	–	9	.719
George Washington	12	–	4	.750	17	–	8	.680
South Carolina	12	–	5	.706	13	–	9	.591
North Carolina	13	–	6	.684	17	–	12	.586
Virginia Tech	9	–	5	.643	16	–	9	.640
Wake Forest	11	–	8	.579	14	–	16	.467
Duke	9	–	7	.563	15	–	15	.500
Clemson	8	–	8	.500	10	–	10	.500
Davidson	6	–	12	.333	10	–	16	.385
Furman	4	–	8	.333	9	–	12	.429
Washington and Lee	4	–	9	.308	8	–	12	.400
Maryland	5	–	13	.278	7	–	18	.280
Richmond	4	–	13	.235	8	–	16	.333
The Citadel	2	–	10	.167	4	–	16	.200
VMI	2	–	11	.154	4	–	17	.190
† 1950 Southern Conference tournament winner As of April 30, 1950; Rankings from AP Poll

1949–50 Southwest Conference men's basketball standings
	Conf.				Overall
Team	W		L	PCT	W		L	PCT
Baylor	8	–	4	.667	14	–	13	.519
Arkansas	8	–	4	.667	12	–	12	.500
SMU	7	–	5	.583	10	–	13	.435
Texas	6	–	6	.500	13	–	11	.542
Texas A&M	6	–	6	.500	10	–	14	.417
TCU	5	–	7	.417	13	–	11	.542
Rice	2	–	10	.167	8	–	15	.348
Rankings from AP poll

1949–50 Western New York Little Three Conference men's basketball standings
	Conf.				Overall
Team	W		L	PCT	W		L	PCT
St. Bonaventure	2	–	2	.500	17	–	5	.773
Niagara	2	–	2	.500	20	–	7	.741
Canisius	2	–	2	.500	17	–	8	.680
Rankings from AP Poll

1949–50 Yankee Conference men's basketball standings
	Conf.				Overall
Team	W		L	PCT	W		L	PCT
Rhode Island State	6	–	1	.857	18	–	8	.692
Connecticut	5	–	2	.714	17	–	8	.680
Vermont	2	–	3	.400	9	–	11	.450
Massachusetts	2	–	3	.400	8	–	11	.421
Maine	3	–	5	.375	13	–	6	.684
New Hampshire	1	–	5	.167	4	–	11	.267

=== Major independents ===
A total of 46 college teams played as major independents. Among major independents, Holy Cross (27–4) finished with both the best winning percentage (.871) and the most wins.

Although not considered a major independent during the season, San Jose State (21–7) played as an independent and was ranked No. 15 in the season's final AP Poll.

1949–50 NCAA men's basketball independents standings
	Conf.				Overall
Team	W		L	PCT	W		L	PCT
No. 4 Holy Cross		–		–	27	–	4	.871
No. 11 Villanova		–		–	25	–	4	.862
No. 10 La Salle		–		–	21	–	4	.840
No. 13 LIU		–		–	20	–	5	.800
No. 6 Duquesne		–		–	23	–	6	.793
Toledo		–		–	22	–	6	.786
Dayton		–		–	24	–	8	.750
Lafayette		–		–	18	–	6	.750
Muhlenberg		–		–	17	–	6	.739
Washington University		–		–	17	–	6	.739
No. 12 San Francisco		–		–	19	–	7	.731
Navy		–		–	14	–	7	.667
Syracuse		–		–	18	–	9	.667
Louisville		–		–	21	–	11	.656
Valparaiso		–		–	15	–	8	.652
Akron		–		–	16	–	9	.640
Santa Clara		–		–	14	–	8	.636
Bowling Green State		–		–	19	–	11	.633
Notre Dame		–		–	15	–	9	.625
Miami (Fla.)		–		–	14	–	9	.609
Temple		–		–	14	–	10	.583
Loyola (Ill.)		–		–	17	–	13	.567
Penn State		–		–	13	–	10	.565
Colgate		–		–	10	–	8	.556
Boston College		–		–	11	–	9	.550
West Virginia		–		–	13	–	11	.542
Army		–		–	9	–	8	.529
Creighton		–		–	13	–	13	.500
Georgetown		–		–	12	–	12	.500
Gettysburg		–		–	12	–	12	.500
DePaul		–		–	12	–	13	.480
Virginia		–		–	12	–	13	.480
Rutgers		–		–	13	–	15	.464
John Carroll		–		–	9	–	11	.450
Baldwin Wallace		–		–	11	–	14	.440
Brown		–		–	11	–	14	.440
Xavier		–		–	12	–	16	.429
Seton Hall		–		–	11	–	15	.423
St. Joseph's		–		–	10	–	15	.400
Loyola (Calif.)		–		–	9	–	17	.346
Wayne		–		–	7	–	15	.318
Marquette		–		–	6	–	17	.261
Bucknell		–		–	5	–	16	.238
Lehigh		–		–	4	–	14	.222
Pittsburgh		–		–	4	–	14	.222
Saint Mary's		–		–	3	–	22	.120
Rankings from AP Poll

=== Informal championships ===
Conference	Regular season winner	Conference player of the year	Conference tournament	Tournament venue (City)	Tournament winner
Middle Three Conference	Lafayatte & Rutgers	None selected	No Tournament		

NOTE: Despite its name, the Middle Three Conference was an informal scheduling alliance rather than a true conference, and its members played as independents. In 1949–50, Lafayatte and Rutgers finished tied for the best record in games played between the three members.

== Post-season tournaments ==
=== NCAA tournament ===
==== Semifinals & finals ====
National semifinals
CCNY	78
NC State	73
Baylor	66
Bradley	68

National Finals
CCNY	71
Bradley	68
Third place
NC State	53
Baylor	41

=== National Invitation tournament ===
==== Semifinals & finals ====
Semifinals
St. John's	72
Bradley	82
Duquesne	52
CCNY	62

Finals
Bradley	61
CCNY	69
Third place
St. John's	69
Duquesne	67

== Awards ==
=== Consensus All-American teams ===
Consensus First Team
Player	Position	Class	Team
Paul Arizin	F	Senior	Villanova
Bob Cousy	G	Senior	Holy Cross
Dick Schnittker	F	Senior	Ohio State
Bill Sharman	G	Senior	Southern California
Paul Unruh	F	Senior	Bradley

Consensus Second Team
Player	Position	Class	Team
Chuck Cooper	F	Senior	Duquesne
Don Lofgran	F/C	Senior	San Francisco
Kevin O'Shea	G	Senior	Notre Dame
Don Rehfeldt	F	Senior	Wisconsin
Sherman White	C	Junior	Long Island

=== Major player of the year awards ===
- Helms Player of the Year: Paul Arizin, Villanova
- Sporting News Player of the Year: Paul Arizin, Villanova

=== Other major awards ===
- NIT/Haggerty Award (Top player in New York City metro area): Sherman White, Long Island

== Coaching changes ==
A number of teams changed coaches during the season and after it ended.

Team	Former Coach	Interim Coach	New Coach	Reason
Colorado	Frosty Cox		Bebe Lee	
Colorado State	Bebe Lee		Bill Strannigan	Lee left to coach Colorado.
Columbia	Gordon Ridings		Lou Rossini	
Dartmouth	Elmer A. Lampe		Doggie Julian	
Duke	Gerry Gerard		Harold Bradley	
Fordham	Frank Adams		Johnny Bach	
Furman	Melvin Bell		Lyles Alley	
Georgia	Ralph Jordan		Jim Whatley	
Idaho State	Ed Willett		Steve Belko	
Iowa	Pops Harrison	Bucky O'Connor	Rollie Williams	Harrison suffered from kidney stones during the season and was relieved of head coaching duties. O'Connor took over as coach for the last 11 games.
Lehigh	Dan Yarbro		Tony Packer	
Loyola (Ill.)	Tom Haggerty		John Jordan	
Maryland	Flucie Stewart		Bud Millikan	
Michigan State	Al Kircher		Pete Newell	
New Hampshire	Ed Stanczyk		Andy Moordian	
Northwestern	Dutch Lonborg		Harold Olsen	
Ohio State	Tippy Dye		Floyd Stahl	
Purdue	Mel Taube		Ray Eddy	
Saint Mary's	Benjamin Neff		Thomas Foley	
San Francisco	Pete Newell		Phil Woolpert	
Santa Clara	Ray Pesco		Bob Feerick	
Syracuse	Lew Andreas		Marc Guley	
Texas A&M	Marty Karow		John Floyd	
USC	Sam Barry		Forrest Twogood	
Utah State	Joe Whitesides		H. Cecil Baker	
Washington & Lee	Conn Davis		Scotty Hamilton	
