= 1949–50 William & Mary Indians men's basketball team =

American college basketball season

1949–50 William & Mary Indians men's basketball

Cincinnati Invitational Tournament
- Conference: Southern Conference
- Record: 23–9 (12–4 SoCon)
- Head coach: Barney Wilson (3rd season)
- Captain: Chet Giermak
- Home arena: Blow Gymnasium

1949–50 Southern Conference men's basketball standings
	Conf.				Overall
Team	W		L	PCT	W		L	PCT
No. 5 NC State †	12	–	2	.857	27	–	6	.818
William & Mary	12	–	4	.750	23	–	9	.719
George Washington	12	–	4	.750	17	–	8	.680
South Carolina	12	–	5	.706	13	–	9	.591
North Carolina	13	–	6	.684	17	–	12	.586
Virginia Tech	9	–	5	.643	16	–	9	.640
Wake Forest	11	–	8	.579	14	–	16	.467
Duke	9	–	7	.563	15	–	15	.500
Clemson	8	–	8	.500	10	–	10	.500
Davidson	6	–	12	.333	10	–	16	.385
Furman	4	–	8	.333	9	–	12	.429
Washington and Lee	4	–	9	.308	8	–	12	.400
Maryland	5	–	13	.278	7	–	18	.280
Richmond	4	–	13	.235	8	–	16	.333
The Citadel	2	–	10	.167	4	–	16	.200
VMI	2	–	11	.154	4	–	17	.190
† 1950 Southern Conference tournament winner As of April 30, 1950; Rankings from AP Poll

The 1949–50 William & Mary Indians men's basketball team represented the College of William & Mary in intercollegiate basketball during the 1949–50 NCAA men's basketball season. Under the third year of head coach Barney Wilson, the team finished the season 23–9 and 12–4 in the Southern Conference. This was the 45th season of the collegiate basketball program at William & Mary, whose nickname is now the Tribe. William & Mary played its home games at Blow Gymnasium.

The Indians finished in a tie for 2nd place in the conference and qualified as the #2 seed for the 1950 Southern Conference men's basketball tournament, hosted by Duke University at the Duke Indoor Stadium in Durham, North Carolina, where the Indians defeated North Carolina in the quarterfinals before losing against Duke in the semifinals.

For the second straight year, William & Mary was invited to participate in the 1950 Cincinnati Invitational Tournament, where the Indians lost their first game against Cincinnati but defeated Morris Harvey in their second.

== Program notes ==
- The Indians won their first ever game against a ranked opponent (and first against an AP Top 10 team) when they defeated #8 NC State on February 7, 1950, at Blow Gymnasium.
- Senior center Chet Giermak was named to the first team All-Southern Conference for the second straight year. Furthermore, Giermak ended the season with the school record for career points at 2,052 (a record that was not surpassed until 2015, broken by Marcus Thornton). He was also named a second team All-American by Collier's Magazine. Following the season, Giermak was drafted by the Rochester Royals of the NBA. William & Mary would eventually retire his number (#32) and honor him with a banner in William & Mary Hall.
- This was the second of three consecutive 20-win seasons for William & Mary, all under head coach Barney Wilson, the only such streak in program history.
- The Indians played eight teams for the first time this season: Colby, Pensacola, John Carroll, Akron, Bowling Green, Siena, Cincinnati, and Morris Harvey/Charleston (WV).

== Schedule ==
1949–50 Southern Conference men's basketball standings
	Conf.				Overall
Team	W		L	PCT	W		L	PCT
No. 5 NC State †	12	–	2	.857	27	–	6	.818
William & Mary	12	–	4	.750	23	–	9	.719
George Washington	12	–	4	.750	17	–	8	.680
South Carolina	12	–	5	.706	13	–	9	.591
North Carolina	13	–	6	.684	17	–	12	.586
Virginia Tech	9	–	5	.643	16	–	9	.640
Wake Forest	11	–	8	.579	14	–	16	.467
Duke	9	–	7	.563	15	–	15	.500
Clemson	8	–	8	.500	10	–	10	.500
Davidson	6	–	12	.333	10	–	16	.385
Furman	4	–	8	.333	9	–	12	.429
Washington and Lee	4	–	9	.308	8	–	12	.400
Maryland	5	–	13	.278	7	–	18	.280
Richmond	4	–	13	.235	8	–	16	.333
The Citadel	2	–	10	.167	4	–	16	.200
VMI	2	–	11	.154	4	–	17	.190
† 1950 Southern Conference tournament winner As of April 30, 1950; Rankings from AP Poll

Date time, TV	Rank^{#}	Opponent^{#}	Result	Record	Site city, state
Regular season
12/6/1949*		at Colby	W 69–53	1–0	Waterville, ME
*		Pensacola	W 72–52	2–0	Blow Gymnasium; Williamsburg, VA
12/10/1949*		Quantico Marines	W 72–51	3–0	Blow Gymnasium; Williamsburg, VA
*		Randolph–Macon	W 73–46	4–0	Blow Gymnasium; Williamsburg, VA
12/16/1949*		at John Carroll	L 54–64	4–1	University Heights, OH
*		at Akron	W 53–49	5–1	Akron Armory; Akron, OH
*		at Bowling Green	L 58–74	5–2	Bowling Green, OH
12/30/1949*		at Seton Hall	W 65–47	6–2	Walsh Gymnasium; South Orange, NJ
*		at Siena	L 50–57	6–3	Loudonville, NY
		at Wake Forest	W 48–34	7–3 (1–0)	Gore Gymnasium; Wake Forest, NC
		Washington and Lee	W 80–56	8–3 (2–0)	Blow Gymnasium; Williamsburg, VA
1/10/1950		at Maryland	W 56–52	9–3 (3–0)	Ritchie Coliseum; College Park, MD
1/12/1950		at No. 9 NC State	L 58–72	9–4 (3–1)	Reynolds Coliseum; Raleigh, NC
		Wake Forest	L 49–61	9–5 (3–2)	Blow Gymnasium; Williamsburg, VA
		at VMI	W 68–43	10–5 (4–2)	Cormack Field House; Lexington, VA
*		Hampden–Sydney	W 70–67 ^{OT}	11–5	Blow Gymnasium; Williamsburg, VA
1/21/1950*		Maryland	W 64–56	12–5 (5–2)	Blow Gymnasium; Williamsburg, VA
		George Washington	W 58–50	13–5 (6–2)	Blow Gymnasium; Williamsburg, VA
2/4/1950		at Richmond	W 50–47	14–5 (7–2)	Blues Armory; Richmond, VA
2/7/1950		No. 8 NC State	W 54–50	15–5 (8–2)	Blow Gymnasium; Williamsburg, VA
		VPI	W 64–50	16–5 (9–2)	Blow Gymnasium; Williamsburg, VA
		North Carolina	L 48–52	16–6 (9–3)	Blow Gymnasium; Williamsburg, VA
		at Washington and Lee	W 70–57	17–6 (10–3)	Doremus Gymnasium; Lexington, VA
		VMI	W 74–57	18–6 (11–3)	Blow Gymnasium; Williamsburg, VA
		at VPI	L 52–54	18–7 (11–4)	War Memorial Gymnasium; Blacksburg, VA
2/21/1950*		at Roanoke	W 53–50	19–7	Roanoke, VA
2/25/1950		Richmond	W 81–54	20–7 (12–4)	Blow Gymnasium; Williamsburg, VA
*		Virginia	W 76–58	21–7	Norfolk City Auditorium; Norfolk, VA
1950 Southern Conference Tournament
3/1/1950		vs. (5) North Carolina; Quarterfinals	W 50–43	22–7	Duke Indoor Stadium; Durham, NC
3/2/1950		vs. (8) Duke; Semifinals	L 50–60	22–8	Duke Indoor Stadium; Durham, NC
1950 Cincinnati Invitational Tournament
3/13/1950		vs. Cincinnati	L 44–80	22–9	Cincinnati Gardens; Cincinnati, OH
		vs. Morris Harvey	W 68–59	23–9	Cincinnati Gardens; Cincinnati, OH
*Non-conference game. ^{#}Rankings from AP Poll. (#) Tournament seedings in parentheses.
