= Kentucky–Tennessee rivalry =

American college sports rivalry

- Kentucky Wildcats Tennessee Volunteers
- Sport: Football, basketball, others

The Kentucky–Tennessee rivalry is a college sports rivalry between the University of Kentucky Wildcats and the University of Tennessee Volunteers. The passionate rivalry between these two Southeastern Conference (SEC) schools, located about 173 miles (278 km) apart, dates to their first college football game in 1893, and has continued across all sports, with the men's basketball series gaining particular attention in recent years.

The football rivalry was once a trophy game known as the Battle for the Barrel, with the victors keeping a painted wooden beer barrel, one half each painted in Vol orange the other in Wildcat blue, until the next contest. The barrel tradition was mutually discontinued in 1998 following a fatal alcohol-related car crash involving two Kentucky football players.

The rivalry is sometimes known as the Border Battle.

== Men's basketball ==
Kentucky–Tennessee men's basketball rivalry
- Kentucky Wildcats Tennessee Volunteers
- Sport: Basketball
- First meeting: February 16, 1910; Kentucky 20, Tennessee 5
- Latest meeting: February 7, 2026; Kentucky 74, Tennessee 71

Statistics
- Total meetings: 244
- All-time series: Kentucky leads, 165–79
- Largest victory: Kentucky, 101–40 (1993)
- Longest win streak: Kentucky, 20 (1950–1960)
- Current win streak: Kentucky, 2 (2026–present)

In contrast to the football series, Kentucky has generally dominated the basketball rivalry. The two teams first played in 1910. For the first couple decades the series was often back and forth, and the rivalry became particularly heated in the 1930s and 1940s, when the Volunteers were coached by John Mauer. Mauer had previously been the coach of Kentucky until he was let go and replaced by Adolph Rupp, adding additional bitterness to the rivalry. Under Mauer, the Volunteers held their own against the ascendant Wildcats. However, from 1945 to 1960, Kentucky won 31 out of 32 games, including a series-record 20 consecutive wins from 1950 to 1960. Overall, Kentucky and Tennessee have met for a total of 242 times and Kentucky has the winning advantage of 162–80.

Arguably, the most famous game occurred during the historic 1965–66 season. Kentucky had defeated Tennessee 78–64, in Lexington, on February 26, 1966. Notably, Howard Bayne was unable to play for the Vols in that game due to an injured ankle. Kentucky had the next week off, while Tennessee won at Georgia Tech on February 28, 1966, 58–47. Kentucky came into the rematch ranked #1 in the country and was undefeated, at 23–0. Tennessee needed a win just to tie for 3rd in the SEC. On March 5, 1966, a standing room only crowd of over 7500 in the old UT Armory Fieldhouse (later that year expanded to over 12,000 and renamed Stokely Athletic Center) witnessed the upset of college basketball's regular season. The Vols led almost the entire way, winning 69–62. Two sport star Ron Widby, Red Robbins and Howard Bayne led Tennessee with a combined 52 points and 33 rebounds, while future NBA coaching legend, Pat Riley, led Kentucky with 22 points. Tennessee finished 20–8, while Kentucky went on to the NCAA Championship game, where they bowed to Texas Western (now UTEP), 72–65, at Maryland's Cole Fieldhouse, and finished 27–2. The historic championship game featured the all-black starting five of Texas Western against the all-white starting five of Kentucky.

Another particularly notable game was the 1972 match-up at Tennessee. Kentucky had won the previous game by two points, but Ray Mears' Tennessee team surprised the league by achieving the best record to that point. If Tennessee won, they would be sole SEC champions and receive the conference's bid for the NCAA tournament; however, a Kentucky win meant a shared SEC title, with Kentucky receiving the tournament bid via tiebreaker. Kentucky won the game 67–66 after a last minute missed Tennessee free throw, splitting the conference title and taking away Tennessee's hopes of a tournament bid.

The two teams met in the 2025 Sweet 16, the first meeting between the two in the NCAA Division I men's basketball tournament. The game marked the third meeting during the season between the two teams, with Tennessee beating Kentucky 78–65 in the tournament. With the win, Tennessee advanced to the Elite 8 for the second consecutive season.

=== Game results ===
The following table displays the complete list of game results. in the rivalry. Kentucky victories are shaded in blue, while Tennessee wins are shaded in orange.

Kentucky victories	Tennessee victories	Tie games

No.	Date	Location	Winning team		Losing team	
1	1910	Lexington, KY	Kentucky	20	Tennessee	5
2	1912	Lexington, KY	Kentucky	27	Tennessee	15
3	1914	Lexington, KY	Kentucky	20	Tennessee	14
4	1914	Lexington, KY	Kentucky	20	Tennessee	18
5	1915	Knoxville, TN	Tennessee	36	Kentucky	21
6	1915	Knoxville, TN	Tennessee	27	Kentucky	22
7	1915	Lexington, KY	Kentucky	22	Tennessee	13
8	1915	Lexington, KY	Kentucky	20	Tennessee	18
9	1916	Lexington, KY	Tennessee	28	Kentucky	17
10	1917	Lexington, KY	Tennessee	23	Kentucky	20
11	1917	Lexington, KY	Tennessee	22	Kentucky	19
12	1917	Knoxville, TN	Tennessee	27	Kentucky	26
13	1917	Knoxville, TN	Tennessee	30	Kentucky	10
14	1918	Lexington, KY	Kentucky	33	Tennessee	26
15	1918	Lexington, KY	Kentucky	40	Tennessee	12
16	1918	Knoxville, TN	Kentucky	29	Tennessee	18
17	1918	Knoxville, TN	Kentucky	32	Tennessee	20
18	1919	Knoxville, TN	Tennessee	40	Kentucky	22
19	1919	Lexington, KY	Kentucky	30	Tennessee	13
20	1920	Lexington, KY	Tennessee	29	Kentucky	24
21	1920	Lexington, KY	Tennessee	27	Kentucky	26
22	1920	Knoxville, TN	Tennessee	28	Kentucky	25
23	1920	Knoxville, TN	Kentucky	34	Tennessee	26
24	1923	Knoxville, TN	Tennessee	30	Kentucky	26
25	1923	Lexington, KY	Tennessee	28	Kentucky	23
26	1924	Knoxville, TN	Tennessee	20	Kentucky	13
27	1925	Knoxville, TN	Kentucky	35	Tennessee	22
28	1925	Lexington, KY	Kentucky	26	Tennessee	21
29	1926	Knoxville, TN	Kentucky	55	Tennessee	17
30	1926	Lexington, KY	Kentucky	27	Tennessee	21
31	1927	Knoxville, TN	Tennessee	19	Kentucky	14
32	1927	Lexington, KY	Tennessee	30	Kentucky	21
33	1928	Lexington, KY	Kentucky	48	Tennessee	18
34	1928	Knoxville, TN	Kentucky	43	Tennessee	16
35	1929	Knoxville, TN	Kentucky	35	Tennessee	29
36	1929	Lexington, KY	Kentucky	27	Tennessee	22
37	1930	Lexington, KY	Kentucky	23	Tennessee	20
38	1930	Knoxville, TN	Tennessee	29	Kentucky	24^{OT}
39	1931	Lexington, KY	Kentucky	31	Tennessee	23
40	1931	Knoxville, TN	Kentucky	39	Tennessee	36^{OT}
41	1932	Knoxville, TN	Kentucky	29	Tennessee	28
42	1932	Lexington, KY	Kentucky	41	Tennessee	27
43	1933	Knoxville, TN	Kentucky	42	Tennessee	21
44	1933	Lexington, KY	Kentucky	44	Tennessee	23
45	1934	Knoxville, TN	Kentucky	44	Tennessee	23
46	1934	Lexington, KY	Kentucky	53	Tennessee	26
47	1935	Lexington, KY	Kentucky	48	Tennessee	21
48	1935	Knoxville, TN	Kentucky	36	Tennessee	34
49	1936	Lexington, KY	Kentucky	40	Tennessee	31
50	1936	Knoxville, TN	Tennessee	39	Kentucky	28
51	1936	Knoxville, TN	Tennessee	39	Kentucky	28
52	1937	Lexington, KY	Kentucky	43	Tennessee	26
53	1937	Knoxville, TN	Tennessee	26	Kentucky	24
54	1937	Knoxville, TN	Kentucky	39	Tennessee	25
55	1938	Lexington, KY	Kentucky	52	Tennessee	27
56	1938	Knoxville, TN	Kentucky	29	Tennessee	26
57	1939	Lexington, KY	Tennessee	30	Kentucky	29
58	1939	Knoxville, TN	Kentucky	36	Tennessee	34^{2OT}
59	1939	Knoxville, TN	Kentucky	46	Tennessee	38
60	1940	Lexington, KY	Kentucky	35	Tennessee	26
61	1940	Knoxville, TN	Tennessee	27	Kentucky	23
62	1940	Knoxville, TN	Kentucky	30	Tennessee	29^{2OT}
63	1941	Knoxville, TN	Tennessee	32	Kentucky	22
64	1941	Lexington, KY	Kentucky	37	Tennessee	28
65	1941	Louisville, KY	Tennessee	36	Kentucky	34
66	1942	Knoxville, TN	Tennessee	46	Kentucky	40
67	1942	Lexington, KY	Kentucky	36	Tennessee	33
68	1943	Knoxville, TN	Kentucky	30	Tennessee	28
69	1943	Lexington, KY	Kentucky	53	Tennessee	29
70	1943	Louisville, KY	Tennessee	33	Kentucky	30
71	1945	Knoxville, TN	Tennessee	35	Kentucky	34
72	1945	Lexington, KY	Kentucky	40	Tennessee	34
73	1945	Louisville, KY	Kentucky	39	Tennessee	35
74	1946	Knoxville, TN	Kentucky	50	Tennessee	32
75	1946	Lexington, KY	Kentucky	54	Tennessee	34
76	1947	Knoxville, TN	Kentucky	54	Tennessee	39
77	1947	Lexington, KY	Kentucky	61	Tennessee	46
78	1948	Knoxville, TN	Kentucky	65	Tennessee	54
79	1948	Lexington, KY	Kentucky	69	Tennessee	42
80	1948	Louisville, KY	Kentucky	70	Tennessee	47
81	1949	Knoxville, TN	Kentucky	66	Tennessee	51
82	1949	Lexington, KY	#1 Kentucky	71	Tennessee	56
83	1949	Louisville, KY	#1 Kentucky	83	Tennessee	44
84	1950	Knoxville, TN	Tennessee	66	#2 Kentucky	53
85	1950	Lexington, KY	#7 Kentucky	79	Tennessee	52
86	1950	Louisville, KY	#4 Kentucky	95	Tennessee	48
87	1951	Knoxville, TN	#2 Kentucky	70	Tennessee	45
88	1951	Lexington, KY	#1 Kentucky	86	Tennessee	61
89	1952	Knoxville, TN	#3 Kentucky	65	Tennessee	56
90	1952	Lexington, KY	#1 Kentucky	71	Tennessee	56
91	1952	Louisville, KY	#1 Kentucky	81	Tennessee	66
92	1954	Knoxville, TN	#1 Kentucky	97	Tennessee	71
93	1954	Lexington, KY	#2 Kentucky	90	Tennessee	63
94	1955	Knoxville, TN	#1 Kentucky	84	Tennessee	66
95	1955	Lexington, KY	#2 Kentucky	104	Tennessee	61
96	1956	Knoxville, TN	#4 Kentucky	95	Tennessee	68
97	1956	Lexington, KY	#12 Kentucky	101	Tennessee	71
98	1957	Knoxville, TN	#4 Kentucky	97	Tennessee	72
99	1957	Lexington, KY	#3 Kentucky	91	Tennessee	75
100	1958	Lexington, KY	#9 Kentucky	77	#13 Tennessee	66
101	1958	Knoxville, TN	#12 Kentucky	77	Tennessee	66
102	1959	Lexington, KY	#2 Kentucky	79	Tennessee	58
103	1959	Knoxville, TN	#1 Kentucky	69	Tennessee	56
104	1960	Knoxville, TN	#17 Kentucky	78	Tennessee	68
105	1960	Lexington, KY	Tennessee	65	Kentucky	63
106	1961	Lexington, KY	Kentucky	83	Tennessee	54
107	1961	Knoxville, TN	Kentucky	68	Tennessee	61
108	1961	Lexington, KY	Kentucky	96	Tennessee	69
109	1962	Knoxville, TN	Tennessee	95	#3 Kentucky	82
110	1962	Lexington, KY	#4 Kentucky	90	Tennessee	59
111	1963	Lexington, KY	Tennessee	78	Kentucky	69
112	1963	Knoxville, TN	Tennessee	63	Kentucky	55
113	1964	Lexington, KY	Tennessee	66	#4 Kentucky	57
114	1964	Knoxville, TN	#2 Kentucky	42	Tennessee	38
115	1965	Knoxville, TN	Tennessee	77	Kentucky	58
116	1965	Lexington, KY	Kentucky	62	Tennessee	60
117	1966	Lexington, KY	#1 Kentucky	78	Tennessee	64
118	1966	Knoxville, TN	Tennessee	69	#1 Kentucky	62
119	1967	Lexington, KY	Tennessee	52	Kentucky	50^{2OT}
120	1967	Knoxville, TN	Tennessee	76	Kentucky	57
121	1968	Knoxville, TN	#4 Tennessee	76	#8 Kentucky	57
122	1968	Lexington, KY	#8 Kentucky	60	#5 Tennessee	59
123	1969	Knoxville, TN	#5 Kentucky	69	Tennessee	66

No.	Date	Location	Winning team		Losing team	
124	1969	Lexington, KY	#7 Kentucky	84	Tennessee	69
125	1970	Lexington, KY	#2 Kentucky	68	Tennessee	52
126	1970	Knoxville, TN	#2 Kentucky	86	Tennessee	69
127	1971	Knoxville, TN	#18Tennessee	75	#10 Kentucky	71
128	1971	Lexington, KY	#8 Kentucky	84	#14 Tennessee	78
129	1972	Lexington, KY	Kentucky	72	#19 Tennessee	70
130	1972	Knoxville, TN	Kentucky	67	Tennessee	66
131	1973	Knoxville, TN	Tennessee	65	Kentucky	64
132	1973	Lexington, KY	#19 Kentucky	86	Tennessee	81
133	1974	Knoxville, TN	Tennessee	67	Kentucky	57
134	1974	Lexington, KY	#7 Kentucky	78	#18 Tennessee	61
135	1975	Lexington, KY	#7 Kentucky	92	#18 Tennessee	88
136	1975	Knoxville, TN	Tennessee	103	#4 Kentucky	98
137	1976	Lexington, KY	#9 Tennessee	90	Kentucky	88^{OT}
138	1976	Knoxville, TN	#8 Tennessee	92	Kentucky	85
139	1977	Lexington, KY	Tennessee	71	#2 Kentucky	67^{OT}
140	1977	Knoxville, TN	#11 Tennessee	81	#2 Kentucky	79
141	1978	Lexington, KY	#3 Kentucky	90	Tennessee	77
142	1978	Knoxville, TN	#2 Kentucky	68	Tennessee	57
143	1979	Lexington, KY	Tennessee	66	Kentucky	55
144	1979	Knoxville, TN	Tennessee	101	Kentucky	81
145	1979	Birmingham, AL	Tennessee	75	Kentucky	69^{OT}
146	1980	Knoxville, TN	Tennessee	49	#2 Kentucky	47
147	1980	Lexington, KY	#3 Kentucky	83	Tennessee	75
148	1981	Lexington, KY	#4 Kentucky	48	#13 Tennessee	47
149	1981	Knoxville, TN	#10 Tennessee	49	#6 Kentucky	47
150	1982	Knoxville, TN	Tennessee	70	#3 Kentucky	66
151	1982	Lexington, KY	#9 Kentucky	77	#16 Tennessee	67
152	1983	Knoxville, TN	Tennessee	65	#10 Kentucky	63
153	1983	Lexington, KY	#10 Kentucky	68	#20 Tennessee	61
154	1984	Lexington, KY	#3 Kentucky	93	Tennessee	74
155	1984	Knoxville, TN	Tennessee	63	#4 Kentucky	58
156	1985	Knoxville, TN	Tennessee	81	Kentucky	65
157	1985	Lexington, KY	Kentucky	92	Tennessee	67
158	1986	Lexington, KY	#11 Kentucky	74	Tennessee	67
159	1986	Knoxville, TN	#5 Kentucky	62	Tennessee	60
160	1987	Knoxville, TN	#9 Kentucky	75	Tennessee	68
161	1987	Lexington, KY	Kentucky	91	Tennessee	84^{OT}
162	1988	Lexington, KY	#5 Kentucky	83	Tennessee	65
163	1988	Knoxville, TN	Tennessee	72	#9 Kentucky	70
164	1989	Knoxville, TN	Kentucky	66	#18 Tennessee	65
165	1989	Lexington, KY	Kentucky	76	Tennessee	71
166	1990	Lexington, KY	Kentucky	95	Tennessee	83
167	1990	Knoxville, TN	Tennessee	102	Kentucky	100
168	1991	Knoxville, TN	#11 Kentucky	78	Tennessee	74
169	1991	Lexington, KY	#16 Kentucky	85	Tennessee	74
170	1992	Knoxville, TN	Tennessee	107	#8 Kentucky	85
171	1992	Lexington, KY	#10 Kentucky	99	Tennessee	88
172	1993	Lexington, KY	#2 Kentucky	84	Tennessee	70
173	1993	Knoxville, TN	Tennessee	78	#2 Kentucky	77
174	1993	Lexington, KY	#4 Kentucky	101	Tennessee	40
175	1994	Lexington, KY	#8 Kentucky	93	Tennessee	74
176	1994	Knoxville, TN	#7 Kentucky	77	Tennessee	73
177	1995	Lexington, KY	#5 Kentucky	69	Tennessee	50
178	1995	Knoxville, TN	#6 Kentucky	68	Tennessee	48
179	1996	Lexington, KY	#2 Kentucky	61	Tennessee	44
180	1996	Knoxville, TN	#2 Kentucky	90	Tennessee	50
181	1997	Lexington, KY	#3 Kentucky	74	Tennessee	40
182	1997	Knoxville, TN	#3 Kentucky	74	Tennessee	64
183	1998	Knoxville, TN	#7 Kentucky	85	Tennessee	67
184	1998	Lexington, KY	#7 Kentucky	80	Tennessee	74
185	1999	Lexington, KY	Tennessee	47	#6 Kentucky	46
186	1999	Knoxville, TN	Tennessee	68	#13 Kentucky	61
187	2000	Lexington, KY	#14 Kentucky	81	#6 Tennessee	68
188	2000	Knoxville, TN	#7 Tennessee	74	#18 Kentucky	67
189	2001	Lexington, KY	Kentucky	84	#4 Tennessee	74
190	2001	Knoxville, TN	#22 Kentucky	103	#15 Tennessee	95
191	2002	Knoxville, TN	Tennessee	76	#7 Kentucky	74^{OT}
192	2002	Lexington, KY	#12 Kentucky	64	Tennessee	61
193	2003	Knoxville, TN	#18 Kentucky	74	Tennessee	71
194	2003	Lexington, KY	#2 Kentucky	80	Tennessee	68
195	2004	Knoxville, TN	#9 Kentucky	69	Tennessee	68^{OT}
196	2004	Lexington, KY	#9 Kentucky	92	Tennessee	60
197	2005	Knoxville, TN	#7 Kentucky	84	Tennessee	62
198	2005	Lexington, KY	#4 Kentucky	73	Tennessee	61
199	2005	Atlanta, GA	#3 Kentucky	76	Tennessee	62
200	2006	Lexington, KY	#11 Tennessee	75	Kentucky	67
201	2006	Knoxville, TN	Kentucky	80	#11 Tennessee	78
202	2007	Lexington, KY	Kentucky	76	Tennessee	57
203	2007	Knoxville, TN	Tennessee	89	#20 Kentucky	85
204	2008	Lexington, KY	Kentucky	72	#3 Tennessee	66
205	2008	Knoxville, TN	#1 Tennessee	63	Kentucky	60
206	2009	Knoxville, TN	Kentucky	90	#24 Tennessee	72
207	2009	Lexington, KY	Kentucky	77	Tennessee	58
208	2010	Lexington, KY	#3 Kentucky	73	#12 Tennessee	62
209	2010	Knoxville, TN	#19 Tennessee	74	#2 Kentucky	65
210	2010	Nashville, TN	#2 Kentucky	74	#15 Tennessee	45
211	2011	Lexington, KY	#18 Kentucky	73	Tennessee	61
212	2011	Knoxville, TN	#20 Kentucky	64	Tennessee	58
213	2012	Knoxville, TN	#2 Kentucky	65	Tennessee	62
214	2012	Lexington, KY	#1 Kentucky	69	Tennessee	44
215	2013	Lexington, KY	Kentucky	75	Tennessee	65
216	2013	Knoxville, TN	Tennessee	88	#25 Kentucky	58
217	2014	Lexington, KY	#13 Kentucky	74	Tennessee	66
218	2015	Knoxville, TN	#1 Kentucky	66	Tennessee	48
219	2016	Knoxville, TN	Tennessee	84	#20 Kentucky	77
220	2016	Lexington, KY	#14 Kentucky	80	Tennessee	70
221	2017	Knoxville, TN	Tennessee	82	#4 Kentucky	80
222	2017	Lexington, KY	#13 Kentucky	83	Tennessee	58
223	2018	Knoxville, TN	#23 Tennessee	76	#17 Kentucky	65
224	2018	Lexington, KY	#15 Tennessee	61	#24 Kentucky	59
225	2018	St. Louis, MO	Kentucky	77	#13 Tennessee	72
226	2019	Lexington, KY	#5 Kentucky	86	#1 Tennessee	69
227	2019	Knoxville, TN	#7 Tennessee	71	#4 Kentucky	52
228	2019	Nashville, TN	#8 Tennessee	82	#4 Kentucky	78
229	2020	Knoxville, TN	#12 Kentucky	77	Tennessee	64
230	2020	Lexington, KY	Tennessee	81	#6 Kentucky	73
231	2021	Lexington, KY	#11 Tennessee	82	Kentucky	71
232	2021	Knoxville, TN	Kentucky	70	#19 Tennessee	55
233	2022	Lexington, KY	#18 Kentucky	107	#22 Tennessee	79
234	2022	Knoxville, TN	#16 Tennessee	76	#4 Kentucky	63
235	2022	Tampa, FL	#9 Tennessee	69	#5 Kentucky	62
236	2023	Knoxville, TN	Kentucky	63	#5 Tennessee	56
237	2023	Lexington, KY	Kentucky	66	#10 Tennessee	54
238	2024	Lexington, KY	#5 Tennessee	103	#10 Kentucky	92
239	2024	Knoxville, TN	#12 Kentucky	85	#6 Tennessee	81
240	2025	Knoxville, TN	#12 Kentucky	78	#8 Tennessee	73
241	2025	Lexington, KY	#15 Kentucky	75	#5 Tennessee	64
242	2025	Indianapolis, IN	#6 Tennessee	78	#18 Kentucky	65
243	2026	Knoxville, TN	Kentucky	80	#24 Tennessee	78
244	2026	Lexington, KY	Kentucky	74	#25 Tennessee	71
Series: Kentucky leads 164–80

== Women's basketball ==
Kentucky–Tennessee women's basketball rivalry
- Kentucky Wildcats Tennessee Volunteers
- Sport: Basketball
- First meeting: January 24, 1976; Tennessee 70, Kentucky 67
- Latest meeting: January 22, 2026; Tennessee 60, Kentucky 58
- Next meeting: January 21, 2027; Lexington, Kentucky

Statistics
- Total meetings: 79
- All-time series: Tennessee leads, 62–17
- Largest victory: Tennessee, 110–38 (2001)
- Longest win streak: Tennessee, 34 (1987–2005)
- Current win streak: Tennessee, 1 (2026–present)

As one of the sports most dominant programs, the Tennessee Lady Vols have controlled the rivalry against Kentucky, leading the all-time series 59–16. While the rivalry may take a back seat to Tennessee's series with UConn, Stanford, Georgia, LSU, and Vanderbilt, as well as Kentucky's longstanding rivalry with South Carolina, the rivalry has gotten especially competitive in the last decade. The teams have met in 4 SEC Tournament title games in 1982, 2010, 2011, and 2014, and Tennessee leads the series in these games 3–1. From 2010 to 2016, the teams met in 13 straight games where both teams were ranked in the top 25, favoring Tennessee 9–4. Under former head coach Matthew Mitchell, Kentucky rose to national prominence and won 2 consecutive games against Tennessee for the first time ever over the 2013 and 2014 seasons. This success continued from Mitchell's years to the first seasons under former Lady Vol player and former Kentucky head coach Kyra Elzy, with Kentucky winning 6 out 10 from 2016 through the 2022 season (and going 9–9 from 2012 to 2022). In February 2023, they met with both teams unranked for the first time since November 1976. In 2026, both teams were ranked, with Tennessee as the victor, leading the series 62–17.

Kentucky victories	Tennessee victories

No.	Date	Location	Winning team		Losing team	
1	January 24, 1976	Cookeville, TN	Tennessee	70	Kentucky	67
2	November 13, 1976	Knoxville, TN	Tennessee	107	Kentucky	53
3	January 7, 1977	Lexington, KY	#16 Tennessee	82	#18 Kentucky	57
4	January 28, 1978	Lexington, KY	#3 Tennessee	92	Kentucky	90^{2OT}
5	February 25, 1978	Knoxville, TN	#1 Tennessee	99	Kentucky	66
6	March 10, 1978	Chapel Hill, NC	#1 Tennessee	76	Kentucky	60
7	January 20, 1979	Lexington, KY	Kentucky	66	#4 Tennessee	64
8	February 17, 1979	Knoxville, TN	#6 Tennessee	89	Kentucky	51
9	February 2, 1980	Lexington, KY	#6 Tennessee	91	#17 Kentucky	83^{OT}
10	February 6, 1981	Knoxville, TN	#11 Tennessee	81	#10 Kentucky	65
11	March 13, 1981	Norfolk, VA	#3 Tennessee	58	#10 Kentucky	49
12	January 28, 1982	Knoxville, TN	Tennessee	81	#8 Kentucky	75
13	February 18, 1982	Lexington, KY	#13 Tennessee	65	#14 Kentucky	61
14	February 28, 1982	Lexington, KY	#13 Kentucky	80	#11 Tennessee	74
15	February 9, 1983	Lexington, KY	#6 Tennessee	95	#4 Kentucky	85
16	February 27, 1983	Knoxville, TN	#6 Kentucky	81	#8 Tennessee	69
17	January 25, 1984	Lexington, KY	#11 Tennessee	75	Kentucky	63
18	February 12, 1984	Knoxville, TN	#6 Tennessee	67	Kentucky	65
19	January 23, 1985	Knoxville, TN	#15 Kentucky	76	Tennessee	72^{OT}
20	February 13, 1985	Lexington, KY	Tennessee	77	#19 Kentucky	66
21	January 24, 1986	Lexington, KY	Kentucky	96	#11 Tennessee	82
22	January 11, 1987	Knoxville, TN	#2 Tennessee	76	Kentucky	64
23	February 18, 1988	Lexington, KY	#3 Tennessee	99	Kentucky	75
24	March 5, 1988	Albany, GA	#3 Tennessee	100	Kentucky	66
25	January 21, 1989	Knoxville, TN	#2 Tennessee	101	Kentucky	57
26	January 22, 1990	Lexington, KY	#3 Tennessee	76	Kentucky	60
27	January 12, 1991	Knoxville, TN	#4 Tennessee	80	Kentucky	70
28	February 8, 1992	Lexington, KY	#4 Tennessee	77	Kentucky	52
29	March 8, 1992	Albany, GA	#2 Tennessee	94	Kentucky	80
30	February 6, 1993	Knoxville, TN	#1 Tennessee	85	#25 Kentucky	61
31	February 18, 1994	Lexington, KY	#1 Tennessee	95	Kentucky	89^{OT}
32	February 19, 1995	Knoxville, TN	#2 Tennessee	67	Kentucky	41
33	March 4, 1995	Chattanooga, TN	#2 Tennessee	74	Kentucky	62
34	January 14, 1996	Lexington, KY	#4 Tennessee	60	Kentucky	45
35	January 12, 1997	Knoxville, TN	#9 Tennessee	84	Kentucky	61
36	January 18, 1998	Lexington, KY	#1 Tennessee	93	Kentucky	65
37	January 17, 1999	Knoxville, TN	#1 Tennessee	98	Kentucky	60
38	January 23, 2000	Lexington, KY	#2 Tennessee	71	Kentucky	65
39	January 30, 2000	Knoxville, TN	#4 Tennessee	77	Kentucky	48
40	January 21, 2001	Lexington, KY	#2 Tennessee	110	Kentucky	38

No.	Date	Location	Winning team		Losing team	
41	January 27, 2001	Knoxville, TN	#3 Tennessee	83	Kentucky	39
42	February 24, 2002	Knoxville, TN	#4 Tennessee	89	Kentucky	64
43	March 2, 2003	Lexington, KY	#3 Tennessee	84	Kentucky	69
44	January 29, 2004	Lexington, KY	#1 Tennessee	81	Kentucky	72
45	January 23, 2005	Knoxville, TN	#7 Tennessee	67	Kentucky	49
46	January 26, 2006	Lexington, KY	Kentucky	66	#1 Tennessee	63
47	February 11, 2007	Knoxville, TN	#3 Tennessee	84	Kentucky	62
48	January 17, 2008	Lexington, KY	#2 Tennessee	65	Kentucky	40
49	February 3, 2008	Knoxville, TN	#2 Tennessee	79	Kentucky	51
50	January 8, 2009	Knoxville, TN	#7 Tennessee	69	Kentucky	64
51	February 19, 2009	Lexington, KY	Kentucky	66	#13 Tennessee	56
52	February 25, 2010	Knoxville, TN	#4 Tennessee	81	#16 Kentucky	65
53	March 7, 2010	Duluth, GA	#4 Tennessee	70	#19 Kentucky	62
54	February 7, 2011	Lexington, KY	#4 Tennessee	73	#15 Kentucky	67
55	March 6, 2011	Nashville, TN	#4 Tennessee	90	#16 Kentucky	65
56	January 12, 2012	Lexington, KY	#9 Kentucky	61	#6 Tennessee	60
57	February 13, 2012	Knoxville, TN	#13 Tennessee	91	#7 Kentucky	54
58	March 3, 2013	Lexington, KY	#10 Kentucky	78	#8 Tennessee	65
59	February 16, 2014	Knoxville, TN	#18 Kentucky	75	#8 Tennessee	71
60	March 9, 2014	Duluth, GA	#6 Tennessee	71	#12 Kentucky	70
61	January 29, 2015	Lexington, KY	#6 Tennessee	73	#10 Kentucky	72
62	February 15, 2015	Knoxville, TN	#6 Tennessee	72	#10 Kentucky	58
63	March 7, 2015	Little Rock, AR	#5 Tennessee	75	#12 Kentucky	64
64	January 25, 2016	Lexington, KY	#12 Kentucky	64	#19 Tennessee	63
65	January 1, 2017	Knoxville, TN	Tennessee	72	#17 Kentucky	65
66	December 31, 2017	Lexington, KY	#7 Tennessee	63	Kentucky	49
67	January 10, 2019	Knoxville, TN	#16 Kentucky	73	#13 Tennessee	71
68	January 5, 2020	Lexington, KY	#13 Kentucky	80	#22 Tennessee	76
69	March 6, 2020	Greenville, SC	#16 Kentucky	86	Tennessee	65
70	January 24, 2021	Knoxville, TN	#25 Tennessee	70	#12 Kentucky	53
71	February 11, 2021	Lexington, KY	#20 Kentucky	71	#16 Tennessee	56
72	January 16, 2022	Knoxville, TN	#5 Tennessee	84	#19 Kentucky	58
73	March 5, 2022	Nashville, TN	Kentucky	83	#18 Tennessee	74
74	February 26, 2023	Lexington, KY	Tennessee	83	Kentucky	63
75	March 3, 2023	Greenville, SC	Tennessee	80	Kentucky	71
76	January 7, 2024	Knoxville, TN	Tennessee	87	Kentucky	69
77	March 7, 2024	Greenville, SC	Tennessee	76	Kentucky	62
78	February 27, 2025	Lexington, KY	#15 Kentucky	82	#11 Tennessee	53
79	January 22, 2026	Knoxville, TN	#17 Tennessee	60	#11 Kentucky	58
Series: Tennessee leads 62–17

== See also ==
- Most-played rivalries in NCAA Division I FBS
