= 1949–50 Kansas Jayhawks men's basketball team =

American college basketball season

1949–50 Kansas Jayhawks men's basketball

Big Seven Co-Champions
- Conference: Big Eight Conference|Big Seven Conference

Ranking
- AP: No. 19
- Record: 14–11 (8–4 Big 7)
- Head coach: Phog Allen (33rd season)
- Assistant coach: Dick Harp (1st season)
- Captain: Claude Houchin
- Home arena: Hoch Auditorium

1949–50 Big Seven Conference men's basketball standings
| | Conf. | | | | Overall |
| Team | W | | L | PCT | W | | L | PCT |
|---|---|---|---|---|---|---|---|---|
| No. 14 Kansas State | 8 | – | 4 | .667 | 17 | – | 7 | .708 |
| Nebraska | 8 | – | 4 | .667 | 16 | – | 7 | .696 |
| No. 19 Kansas | 8 | – | 4 | .667 | 14 | – | 11 | .560 |
| Colorado | 6 | – | 6 | .500 | 14 | – | 8 | .636 |
| Oklahoma | 6 | – | 6 | .500 | 12 | – | 10 | .545 |
| Missouri | 4 | – | 8 | .333 | 14 | – | 10 | .583 |
| Iowa State | 2 | – | 10 | .167 | 6 | – | 17 | .261 |
Rankings from AP Poll

The 1949–50 Kansas Jayhawks men's basketball team represented the University of Kansas during the 1949–50 college men's basketball season.

== Roster ==
- Clyde Lovellette
- Claude Houchin
- Jerry Waugh
- Bill Hougland
- Bill Lienhard
- Bob Kenney
- Harold England
- Gene Petersen
- Jack Carby
- Dean Wells
- Guy Mabry
- Clinton Bull
- Aubrey Linville
- Lyn Smith
- Maurice Martin
- Dale Engel
- Bill Schaake
- Jay Drake
- Jerry Bogue
- Charles Bates
- Harold Lowe
- Carl Reade

== Schedule ==
| Date time, TV | Rank^{#} | Opponent^{#} | Result | Record | Site city, state |
|---|---|---|---|---|---|
| December 3* | | at Rockhurst | L 55–34 | 1-0 | Municipal Auditorium; Kansas City, MO |
| December 5* | | at Creighton | L 55–59 | 1-1 | Vincardi Center; Omaha, NE |
| December 10* | | Purdue | W 60–52 | 2-1 | Hoch Auditorium; Lawrence, KS |
| December 15* | | at Cincinnati | L 54–56 | 2-2 | Cincinnati Gardens; Cincinnati, OH |
| December 17* | | at Duquesne | L 54–64 | 2-3 | Duquesne Gymnasium; Pittsburgh, PA |
| December 20* | | at Holy Cross | L 53–57 | 2-4 | Boston Garden; Boston, MA |
| December 23* | | at Springfield | W 53–43 | 3-4 | Blake Arena; Springfield, MA |
| December 27 | | vs. Kansas State; Sunflower Showdown | L 48–58 | 3-5 | Municipal Auditorium; Kansas City, MO |
| December 29 | | vs. Iowa State | W 64–43 | 4-5 | Municipal Auditorium; Kansas City, MO |
| December 30* | | vs. Michigan | L 47–49 | 4-6 | Municipal Auditorium; Kansas City, MO |
| January 6 | | No. 17 Oklahoma | W 56–50 | 5-6 (1-0) | Hoch Auditorium; Lawrence, KS |
| January 10 | | at Nebraska | L 56–57 | 5-7 (1-1) | Nebraska Coliseum; Lincoln, NE |
| January 14 | | No. 16 Missouri; Border War | W 48–44 | 6-7 (2-1) | Hoch Auditorium; Lawrence, KS |
| January 27 | | Iowa State | W 67–42 | 7-3 (3-1) | Hoch Auditorium; Lawrence, KS |
| January 30* | | Drake | W 76–50 | 8-3 | Hoch Auditorium; Lawrence, KS |
| February 6 | | at Colorado | L 48–50 | 8-4 (3-2) | Balch Fieldhouse; Boulder, CO |
| February 11 | | Nebraska | W 49–36 | 9-4 (4-2) | Hoch Auditorium; Lawrence, KS |
| February 14 | | at No. 14 Kansas State; Sunflower Showdown | L 50–55 | 9-5 (4-3) | Nichols Hall; Manhattan, KS |
| February 17 | | Missouri; Border War | W 59–52 | 10-5 (5-3) | Hoch Auditorium; Lawrence, KS |
| February 20* | | at Drake | W 67–50 | 11-5 | Drake Fieldhouse; Des Moines, IA |
| February 25 | | Colorado | W 76–60 | 12-5 (6-3) | Hoch Auditorium; Lawrence, KS |
| March 3 | | at Iowa State | W 66–52 | 13-5 (7-3) | The Armory; Ames, IA |
| March 7 | No. 19 | No. 14 Kansas State; Sunflower Showdown | W 79–68 | 14-5 (8-3) | Hoch Auditorium; Lawrence, KS |
| March 11 | No. 19 | at Oklahoma | L 49–52 ^{OT} | 14-6 (8-4) | Field House; Norman, OK |
| March 20 | No. 19 | at vs. No. 1 Bradley | L 57–59 | 14-7 | Municipal Auditorium; Kansas City, MO |
*Non-conference game. ^{#}Rankings from AP Poll. (#) Tournament seedings in parentheses.
