= 1949–50 Princeton Tigers men's basketball team =

American college basketball season

1949–50 Princeton Tigers men's basketball
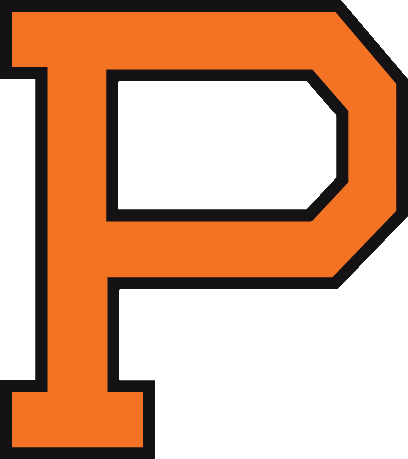

EIBL Champions
- Conference: Eastern Intercollegiate Basketball League
- Record: 14–9 (11–1, 1st EIBL)
- Head coach: Franklin Cappon
- Captain: Bernard S. Adams
- Home arena: Dillon Gymnasium

The 1949–50 Princeton Tigers men's basketball team represented Princeton University in intercollegiate college basketball during the 1949–50 NCAA men's basketball season. The head coach was Franklin Cappon and the team captain was Bernard S. Adams. The team played its home games in the Dillon Gymnasium on the university campus in Princeton, New Jersey. The team was the winner of the Eastern Intercollegiate Basketball League (EIBL). The team recovered from an early seven-game losing streak leaving it with a 1–7 record and posted a 14–9 overall record and an 11–1 conference record.
