= Oklahoma Sooners men's basketball, 1950–1959 =

== 1949–50 season ==
1949–50 Oklahoma Sooners men's basketball
- Conference: Big Seven Conference
- Record: 12–10 (6–6 Big Seven)
- Head coach: Bruce Drake (12th season)
- Home arena: McCasland Field House

1949–50 Big Seven Conference men's basketball standings
	Conf.				Overall
Team	W		L	PCT	W		L	PCT
No. 14 Kansas State	8	–	4	.667	17	–	7	.708
Nebraska	8	–	4	.667	16	–	7	.696
No. 19 Kansas	8	–	4	.667	14	–	11	.560
Colorado	6	–	6	.500	14	–	8	.636
Oklahoma	6	–	6	.500	12	–	10	.545
Missouri	4	–	8	.333	14	–	10	.583
Iowa State	2	–	10	.167	6	–	17	.261
Rankings from AP Poll

The 1949–50 Oklahoma Sooners men's basketball team represented the University of Oklahoma in the 1949–50 NCAA men's basketball season college basketball season as a member of the Big Seven Conference. The Sooners finished the season with a 12–10 overall record, and finished tied for fourth in the Big Seven Conference with a 6–6 conference record. They were coached by Bruce Drake in his twelfth season as head coach of the Sooners. They played their home games at McCasland Field House in Norman, Oklahoma.

=== Schedule ===
Date time, TV	Rank^{#}	Opponent^{#}	Result	Record	Site city, state
Regular season
December 3, 1949*		Texas	W 65–48	1–0	McCasland Field House; Norman, OK
December 10, 1949*		Illinois	W 55–47	2–0	McCasland Field House; Norman, OK
December 17, 1949*		at Illinois	L 47–57	2–1	Huff Gym; Champaign, IL
December 19, 1949*		at CCNY	W 67–63	3–1	Madison Square Garden; New York, NY
December 27, 1949		vs. Iowa State; Big Eight Holiday Tournament	W 66–57	4–1	Municipal Auditorium; Kansas City, MO
December 29, 1949		vs. Kansas State; Big Eight Holiday Tournament	W 55–50	5–1	Municipal Auditorium; Kansas City, MO
December 30, 1949*		vs. Missouri; Big Eight Holiday Tournament	L 42–44	5–2	Municipal Auditorium; Kansas City, MO
January 6, 1950	No. 17	at Kansas	L 50–56	5–3 (0–1)	Hoch Auditorium; Lawrence, KS
January 9, 1950	No. 19	No. 16 Missouri	W 41–36	6–3 (1–1)	McCasland Field House; Norman, OK
January 13, 1950	No. 19	Kansas State	L 42–43 ^{OT}	6–4 (1–2)	McCasland Field House; Norman, OK
January 18, 1950*		at Oklahoma A&M; Bedlam Series	L 37–45	6–5	Gallagher Hall; Stillwater, OK
January 21, 1950		Colorado	L 43–46	6–6 (1–3)	McCasland Field House; Norman, OK
January 30, 1950*		at Texas	W 55–45	7–6	Gregory Gymnasium; Austin, TX
February 4, 1950		at No. 11 Kansas State	L 68–91	7–7 (1–4)	Nichols Hall; Manhattan, KS
February 6, 1950		at Iowa State	W 63–57	8–7 (1–5)	Iowa State Armory; Ames, IA
February 13, 1950		Nebraska	L 55–57	8–8 (2–5)	McCasland Field House; Norman, OK
February 20, 1950		Iowa State	W 76–48	9–8 (3–5)	McCasland Field House; Norman, OK
February 25, 1950		at Missouri	W 45–40 ^{OT}	10–8 (4–5)	Brewer Fieldhouse; Columbia, MO
March 1, 1950*		Oklahoma A&M; Bedlam Series	L 37–48	10–9	McCasland Field House; Norman, OK
March 4, 1950		at No. 16 Nebraska	W 64–48	11–9 (5–5)	Nebraska Coliseum; Lincoln, NE
March 6, 1950		at Colorado	L 49–58	11–10 (5–6)	Balch Fieldhouse; Boulder, CO
March 11, 1950		No. 19 Kansas	W 52–49 ^{OT}	12–10 (6–6)	McCasland Field House; Norman, OK
*Non-conference game. ^{#}Rankings from AP Poll. (#) Tournament seedings in parentheses. All times are in Central Time..

=== NBA draft selections ===
Round	Pick	Player	NBA club
4	48	Paul Merchant	Syracuse Nationals
6	71	Wayne Glasgow	Minneapolis Lakers

== 1950–51 season ==
1950–51 Oklahoma Sooners men's basketball
- Conference: Big Seven Conference
- Record: 14–10 (6–6 Big Seven)
- Head coach: Bruce Drake (13th season)
- Home arena: McCasland Field House

1950–51 Big Seven Conference men's basketball standings
	Conf.				Overall
Team	W		L	PCT	W		L	PCT
No. 4 Kansas State	11	–	1	.917	25	–	4	.862
Kansas	8	–	4	.667	16	–	8	.667
Missouri	8	–	4	.667	16	–	8	.667
Oklahoma	6	–	6	.500	14	–	10	.583
Nebraska	4	–	8	.333	9	–	14	.391
Iowa State	3	–	9	.250	9	–	12	.429
Colorado	2	–	10	.167	4	–	20	.167
Rankings from AP Poll

The 1950–51 Oklahoma Sooners men's basketball team represented the University of Oklahoma in the 1950–51 NCAA men's basketball season college basketball season as a member of the Big Seven Conference. The Sooners finished the season with a 14–10 overall record, and finished fourth in the Big Seven Conference with a 6–6 conference record. They were coached by Bruce Drake in his thirteenth season as head coach of the Sooners. They played their home games at McCasland Field House in Norman, Oklahoma.

=== NBA draft selections ===
Round	Pick	Player	NBA club
1	3	Marcus Freiberger	Indianapolis Olympians

== 1951–52 season ==
1951–52 Oklahoma Sooners men's basketball
- Conference: Big Seven Conference
- Record: 7–17 (4–8 Big Seven)
- Head coach: Bruce Drake (14th season)
- Home arena: McCasland Field House

1951–52 Big Seven Conference men's basketball standings
	Conf.				Overall
Team	W		L	PCT	W		L	PCT
No. 8 Kansas	11	–	1	.917	28	–	3	.903
No. 3 Kansas State	10	–	2	.833	19	–	5	.792
Missouri	6	–	6	.500	14	–	10	.583
Iowa State	4	–	8	.333	10	–	11	.476
Colorado	4	–	8	.333	8	–	16	.333
Oklahoma	4	–	8	.333	7	–	17	.292
Nebraska	3	–	9	.250	7	–	17	.292
Rankings from AP Poll

The 1951–52 Oklahoma Sooners men's basketball team represented the University of Oklahoma in the 1951–52 NCAA men's basketball season college basketball season as a member of the Big Seven Conference. The Sooners finished the season with a 7–17 overall record, and finished tied for fourth in the Big Seven Conference with a 4–8 conference record. They were coached by Bruce Drake in his fourteenth season as head coach of the Sooners. They played their home games at McCasland Field House in Norman, Oklahoma.

== 1952–53 season ==
1952–53 Oklahoma Sooners men's basketball
- Conference: Big Seven Conference
- Record: 8–13 (5–7 Big Seven)
- Head coach: Bruce Drake (15th season)
- Home arena: McCasland Field House

1952–53 Big Seven Conference men's basketball standings
	Conf.				Overall
Team	W		L	PCT	W		L	PCT
No. 3 Kansas	10	–	2	.833	19	–	6	.760
No. 12 Kansas State	9	–	3	.750	17	–	4	.810
Missouri	6	–	6	.500	11	–	9	.550
Iowa State	5	–	7	.417	10	–	11	.476
Oklahoma	5	–	7	.417	8	–	13	.381
Nebraska	4	–	8	.333	9	–	11	.450
Colorado	3	–	9	.250	10	–	11	.476
Rankings from AP Poll

The 1952–53 Oklahoma Sooners men's basketball team represented the University of Oklahoma in the 1952–53 NCAA men's basketball season college basketball season as a member of the Big Seven Conference. The Sooners finished the season with an 8–13 overall record, and finished tied for fourth in the Big Seven Conference with a 5–7 conference record. They were coached by Bruce Drake in his fifteenth season as head coach of the Sooners. They played their home games at McCasland Field House in Norman, Oklahoma.

== 1953–54 season ==
1953–54 Oklahoma Sooners men's basketball
- Conference: Big Seven Conference
- Record: 8–13 (4–8 Big Seven)
- Head coach: Bruce Drake (16th season)
- Home arena: McCasland Field House

1953–54 Big Seven Conference men's basketball standings
	Conf.				Overall
Team	W		L	PCT	W		L	PCT
No. 18 Kansas	10	–	2	.833	16	–	5	.762
Colorado	10	–	2	.833	11	–	11	.500
Missouri	6	–	6	.500	11	–	10	.524
Kansas State	5	–	7	.417	11	–	10	.524
Nebraska	5	–	7	.417	8	–	13	.381
Oklahoma	4	–	8	.333	8	–	13	.381
Iowa State	2	–	10	.167	6	–	15	.286
Rankings from AP Poll

The 1953–54 Oklahoma Sooners men's basketball team represented the University of Oklahoma in the 1953–54 NCAA men's basketball season college basketball season as a member of the Big Seven Conference. The Sooners finished the season with an 8–13 overall record, and finished tied for sixth in the Big Seven Conference with a 4–8 conference record. They were coached by Bruce Drake in his sixteenth season as head coach of the Sooners. They played their home games at McCasland Field House in Norman, Oklahoma.

=== NBA draft selections ===
Round	Pick	Player	NBA club
11	106	Bob Waller	New York Knicks

== 1954–55 season ==
1954–55 Oklahoma Sooners men's basketball
- Conference: Big Seven Conference
- Record: 3–18 (1–11 Big Seven)
- Head coach: Bruce Drake (17th season)
- Home arena: McCasland Field House

1954–55 Big Seven Conference men's basketball standings
	Conf.				Overall
Team	W		L	PCT	W		L	PCT
No. 15 Colorado	11	–	1	.917	19	–	6	.760
Missouri	9	–	3	.750	16	–	5	.762
Kansas State	6	–	6	.500	11	–	10	.524
Nebraska	6	–	6	.500	9	–	12	.429
Kansas	5	–	7	.417	11	–	10	.524
Iowa State	4	–	8	.333	11	–	10	.524
Oklahoma	1	–	11	.083	3	–	18	.143
Rankings from AP Poll

The 1954–55 Oklahoma Sooners men's basketball team represented the University of Oklahoma in the 1954–55 NCAA men's basketball season college basketball season as a member of the Big Seven Conference. The Sooners finished the season with a 3–18 overall record, and finished last in the Big Seven Conference with a 1–11 conference record. They were coached by Bruce Drake in his sixteenth season as head coach of the Sooners. They played their home games at McCasland Field House in Norman, Oklahoma.

== 1955–56 season ==
1955–56 Oklahoma Sooners men's basketball
- Conference: Big Seven Conference
- Record: 4–19 (1–11 Big Seven)
- Head coach: Doyle Parrack (1st season)
- Home arena: McCasland Field House

1955–56 Big Seven Conference men's basketball standings
	Conf.				Overall
Team	W		L	PCT	W		L	PCT
Kansas State	9	–	3	.750	17	–	8	.680
Iowa State	8	–	4	.667	18	–	5	.783
Missouri	8	–	4	.667	15	–	7	.682
Colorado	7	–	5	.583	11	–	10	.524
Kansas	6	–	6	.500	14	–	9	.609
Nebraska	3	–	9	.250	7	–	16	.304
Oklahoma	1	–	11	.083	4	–	19	.174
Rankings from AP Poll

The 1955–56 Oklahoma Sooners men's basketball team represented the University of Oklahoma in the 1955–56 NCAA men's basketball season college basketball season as a member of the Big Seven Conference. The Sooners finished the season with a 4–19 overall record, and finished last in the Big Seven Conference with a 1–11 conference record. They were coached by Doyle Parrack in his first season as head coach of the Sooners. They played their home games at McCasland Field House in Norman, Oklahoma.

== 1956–57 season ==
1956–57 Oklahoma Sooners men's basketball
- Conference: Big Seven Conference
- Record: 8–15 (3–9 Big Seven)
- Head coach: Doyle Parrack (2nd season)
- Home arena: McCasland Field House

1956–57 Big Seven Conference men's basketball standings
	Conf.				Overall
Team	W		L	PCT	W		L	PCT
No. 2 Kansas	11	–	1	.917	24	–	3	.889
Kansas State	8	–	4	.667	15	–	8	.652
Iowa State	6	–	6	.500	16	–	7	.696
Colorado	5	–	7	.417	14	–	9	.609
Nebraska	5	–	7	.417	11	–	12	.478
Missouri	4	–	8	.333	10	–	13	.435
Oklahoma	3	–	9	.250	8	–	15	.348
Rankings from AP Poll

The 1956–57 Oklahoma Sooners men's basketball team represented the University of Oklahoma in the 1956–57 NCAA University Division men's basketball season college basketball season as a member of the Big Seven Conference. The Sooners finished the season with an 8–15 overall record, and finished last in the Big Seven Conference with a 3–9 conference record. They were coached by Doyle Parrack in his second season as head coach of the Sooners. They played their home games at McCasland Field House in Norman, Oklahoma.

== 1957–58 season ==
1957–58 Oklahoma Sooners men's basketball
- Conference: Big Eight Conference
- Record: 13–10 (5–7 Big Eight)
- Head coach: Doyle Parrack (3rd season)
- Home arena: McCasland Field House

1957–58 Big Eight Conference men's basketball standings
	Conf.				Overall
Team	W		L	PCT	W		L	PCT
No. 3 Kansas State	10	–	2	.833	22	–	5	.815
No. 7 Kansas	8	–	4	.667	18	–	5	.783
Iowa State	8	–	4	.667	15	–	8	.652
Oklahoma	5	–	7	.417	13	–	10	.565
Nebraska	5	–	7	.417	10	–	13	.435
Missouri	3	–	9	.250	9	–	13	.409
Colorado	3	–	9	.250	8	–	15	.348
Rankings from AP Poll

The 1957–58 Oklahoma Sooners men's basketball team represented the University of Oklahoma in the 1957–58 NCAA University Division men's basketball season college basketball season as a member of the Big Eight Conference. The Sooners finished the season with a 13–10 overall record, and finished tied for fourth in the Big Eight Conference with a 5–7 conference record. They were coached by Doyle Parrack in his third season as head coach of the Sooners. They played their home games at McCasland Field House in Norman, Oklahoma.

=== NBA draft selections ===
Round	Pick	Player	NBA club
6	44	Joe King	New York Knicks

== 1958–59 season ==
1958–59 Oklahoma Sooners men's basketball
- Conference: Big Eight Conference
- Record: 15–10 (9–5 Big Eight)
- Head coach: Doyle Parrack (4th season)
- Home arena: McCasland Field House

1958–59 Big Eight Conference men's basketball standings
	Conf.				Overall
Team	W		L	PCT	W		L	PCT
No. 1 Kansas State	14	–	0	1.000	25	–	2	.926
Oklahoma	9	–	5	.643	15	–	10	.600
Colorado	8	–	6	.571	14	–	10	.583
Kansas	8	–	6	.571	11	–	14	.440
Nebraska	5	–	9	.357	12	–	13	.480
Oklahoma State	5	–	9	.357	11	–	14	.440
Iowa State	4	–	10	.286	9	–	16	.360
Missouri	3	–	11	.214	6	–	19	.240
Rankings from AP Poll

The 1958–59 Oklahoma Sooners men's basketball team represented the University of Oklahoma in the 1958–59 NCAA University Division men's basketball season college basketball season as a member of the Big Eight Conference. The Sooners finished the season with a 15–10 overall record, and finished second in the Big Eight Conference with a 9–5 conference record. They were coached by Doyle Parrack in his fourth season as head coach of the Sooners. They played their home games at McCasland Field House in Norman, Oklahoma.
