= 1950 SEC men's basketball tournament =

- Classification: Division I
- Season: 1949–50
- Teams: 12
- Site: Jefferson County Armory; Louisville, Kentucky
- Champions: Kentucky (12th title)
- Winning coach: Adolph Rupp (12th title)

1949–50 Southeastern Conference men's basketball standings
	Conf.				Overall
Team	W		L	PCT	W		L	PCT
No. 3 Kentucky †	11	–	2	.846	25	–	5	.833
Vanderbilt	11	–	3	.786	17	–	8	.680
Auburn	12	–	6	.667	17	–	7	.708
Tulane	8	–	4	.667	15	–	7	.682
Alabama	8	–	9	.471	9	–	12	.429
Georgia	6	–	7	.462	15	–	9	.625
Tennessee	5	–	6	.455	15	–	11	.577
Georgia Tech	7	–	9	.438	14	–	13	.519
LSU	5	–	8	.385	13	–	12	.520
Mississippi State	6	–	10	.375	7	–	11	.389
Florida	4	–	10	.286	9	–	14	.391
Ole Miss	4	–	13	.235	8	–	17	.320
† 1950 SEC Tournament winner Rankings from AP Poll

The 1950 SEC men's basketball tournament took place March 2–4, 1950 in Louisville, Kentucky at the Jefferson County Armory. It was the seventeenth SEC tournament.

Kentucky won the tournament championship game by beating Tennessee, 95–58. The Wildcats would play in the 1950 National Invitation Tournament, losing to eventual champion CCNY in the second round. No SEC teams were invited to the 1950 NCAA tournament.

The 1950 tournament was the final edition which awarded its winner the SEC Championship. Starting in 1951, the SEC played a round robin schedule and awarded its conference championship to the team with the best regular season record.

== Bracket ==
First Round; March 2
LSU	66
Florida	57
Tennessee	63
Georgia Tech	56
Georgia	59
Ole Miss	58
Mississippi State	56
Tulane	47

Second Round; March 3
Auburn	45
LSU	73
Tennessee	50
Vanderbilt	44
Alabama	51^{OT}
Georgia	52
#4 Kentucky	56
Mississippi State	46

Semifinals; March 4
LSU	79^{OT}
Tennessee	81
Georgia	63
#4 Kentucky	79

Championship; March 4
Tennessee	58
#4 Kentucky	95
