= 1949–50 Duke Blue Devils men's basketball team =

American college basketball season

1949–50 Duke Blue Devils men's basketball
- Conference: Southern Conference
- Record: 15–15 (9–7 Southern)
- Head coach: Gerry Gerard
- Home arena: Duke Indoor Stadium

1949–50 Southern Conference men's basketball standings
| | Conf. | | | | Overall |
| Team | W | | L | PCT | W | | L | PCT |
|---|---|---|---|---|---|---|---|---|
| No. 5 NC State † | 12 | – | 2 | .857 | 27 | – | 6 | .818 |
| William & Mary | 12 | – | 4 | .750 | 23 | – | 9 | .719 |
| George Washington | 12 | – | 4 | .750 | 17 | – | 8 | .680 |
| South Carolina | 12 | – | 5 | .706 | 13 | – | 9 | .591 |
| North Carolina | 13 | – | 6 | .684 | 17 | – | 12 | .586 |
| Virginia Tech | 9 | – | 5 | .643 | 16 | – | 9 | .640 |
| Wake Forest | 11 | – | 8 | .579 | 14 | – | 16 | .467 |
| Duke | 9 | – | 7 | .563 | 15 | – | 15 | .500 |
| Clemson | 8 | – | 8 | .500 | 10 | – | 10 | .500 |
| Davidson | 6 | – | 12 | .333 | 10 | – | 16 | .385 |
| Furman | 4 | – | 8 | .333 | 9 | – | 12 | .429 |
| Washington and Lee | 4 | – | 9 | .308 | 8 | – | 12 | .400 |
| Maryland | 5 | – | 13 | .278 | 7 | – | 18 | .280 |
| Richmond | 4 | – | 13 | .235 | 8 | – | 16 | .333 |
| The Citadel | 2 | – | 10 | .167 | 4 | – | 16 | .200 |
| VMI | 2 | – | 11 | .154 | 4 | – | 17 | .190 |
† 1950 Southern Conference tournament winner As of April 30, 1950; Rankings from AP Poll

The 1949–50 Duke Blue Devils men's basketball team represented Duke University during the 1949–50 men's college basketball season. The head coach was Gerry Gerard, coaching his eighth and final season with the Blue Devils. The team finished with an overall record of 15–15.
