= 1949–50 NC State Wolfpack men's basketball team =

American college basketball season

1949–50 NC State Wolfpack men's basketball
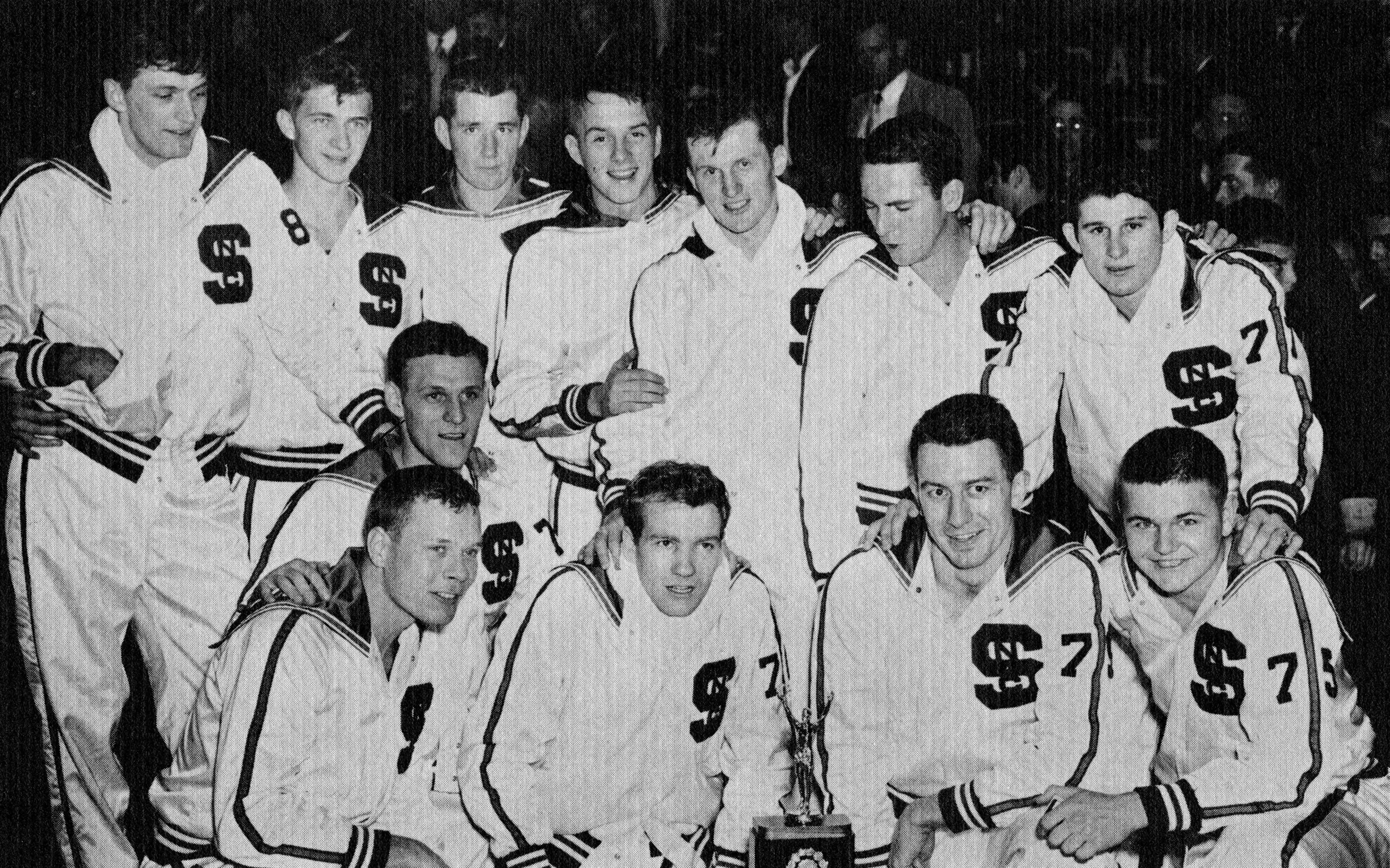

NCAA tournament, Third place
- Conference: Southern Conference

Ranking
- AP: No. 5
- Record: 27–6 (12–2 SoCon)
- Head coach: Everett Case (4th season)
- Home arena: Reynolds Coliseum

1949–50 Southern Conference men's basketball standings
	Conf.				Overall
Team	W		L	PCT	W		L	PCT
No. 5 NC State †	12	–	2	.857	27	–	6	.818
William & Mary	12	–	4	.750	23	–	9	.719
George Washington	12	–	4	.750	17	–	8	.680
South Carolina	12	–	5	.706	13	–	9	.591
North Carolina	13	–	6	.684	17	–	12	.586
Virginia Tech	9	–	5	.643	16	–	9	.640
Wake Forest	11	–	8	.579	14	–	16	.467
Duke	9	–	7	.563	15	–	15	.500
Clemson	8	–	8	.500	10	–	10	.500
Davidson	6	–	12	.333	10	–	16	.385
Furman	4	–	8	.333	9	–	12	.429
Washington and Lee	4	–	9	.308	8	–	12	.400
Maryland	5	–	13	.278	7	–	18	.280
Richmond	4	–	13	.235	8	–	16	.333
The Citadel	2	–	10	.167	4	–	16	.200
VMI	2	–	11	.154	4	–	17	.190
† 1950 Southern Conference tournament winner As of April 30, 1950; Rankings from AP Poll

The 1949–50 NC State Wolfpack men's basketball team represented North Carolina State University as a member of the Southern Conference during the 1949–50 NCAA men's basketball season. Led by head coach Everett Case, the team played their home games at the brand new Reynolds Coliseum in Raleigh, North Carolina.

== Roster ==
1949–50 NC State Wolfpack men's basketball team
Players
Coaches

Pos.	#	Name	Height	Weight	Year	Hometown
G		Vic Bubas	6 ft 2 in (1.88 m)	—	Jr	Gary, Indiana
F	70	Dick Dickey	6 ft 1 in (1.85 m)	175 lb (79 kg)	Sr	Pendleton, Indiana
F	77	Sam Ranzino	6 ft 1 in (1.85 m)	185 lb (84 kg)	Jr	Gary, Indiana

Head coach

- Everett Case

Assistant coach(es)

Legend

- (C) Team captain
- (S) Suspended
- (I) Ineligible
- (W) Walk-on
- Injured
- Current redshirt

== Schedule and results ==
Date time, TV	Rank^{#}	Opponent^{#}	Result	Record	Site city, state
Regular season
Dec 2, 1949		Washington & Lee	W 67–47	1–0 (1–0)	Reynolds Coliseum; Raleigh, North Carolina
Dec 5, 1949		Davidson	W 77–43	2–0 (2–0)	Reynolds Coliseum; Raleigh, North Carolina
Dec 8, 1949		George Washington	W 74–52	3–0 (3–0)	Reynolds Coliseum; Raleigh, North Carolina
Dec 15, 1949*		Loyola Marymount	W 62–47	4–0	Reynolds Coliseum; Raleigh, North Carolina
Dec 19, 1949*		Michigan	L 46–54	4–1	Reynolds Coliseum; Raleigh, North Carolina
Dec 20, 1949*		Michigan	W 63–52	5–1	Reynolds Coliseum; Raleigh, North Carolina
Dec 29, 1949*		Georgia Tech	W 57–34	7–1	Reynolds Coliseum; Raleigh, North Carolina
Dec 30, 1949*		vs. Penn State	W 50–40	8–1	
Jan 3, 1950*		San Francisco	W 69–54	9–1	Reynolds Coliseum; Raleigh, North Carolina
Feb 25, 1950*		Villanova	L 64–65	22–5	Reynolds Coliseum; Raleigh, North Carolina
Southern Conference tournament
Mar 2, 1950*	No. 8	vs. Virginia Tech; Quarterfinals	W 67–42	23–5	Cameron Indoor Stadium; Durham, North Carolina
Mar 3, 1950*	No. 8	vs. Wake Forest; Semifinals	W 59–53	24–5	Cameron Indoor Stadium; Durham, North Carolina
Mar 4, 1950*	No. 8	at Duke; Championship game	W 67–47	25–5	Cameron Indoor Stadium; Durham, North Carolina
NCAA tournament
Mar 24, 1950*	No. 5	vs. No. 4 Holy Cross; National Quarterfinal	W 87–74	26–5	Madison Square Garden; New York, New York
Mar 25, 1950*	No. 5	vs. CCNY; National Semifinal – Final Four	L 73–78	26–6	Madison Square Garden; New York, New York
Mar 28, 1950*	No. 5	vs. Baylor; National consolation game	W 53–41	27–6	Madison Square Garden; New York, New York
*Non-conference game. ^{#}Rankings from AP Poll. (#) Tournament seedings in parentheses.
