= Bernard S. Adams =

American academic (1928–2017)

President of Ripon College
- In office 1966–1985
- Preceded by: Frederick Oliver Pinkham
- Succeeded by: William R. Stott Jr.

President of Fort Lewis College
- In office 1985–1987
- Preceded by: Rexer Berndt
- Succeeded by: Joel M. Jones

Personal details
- Born: Bernard Schroder Adams; July 20, 1928 Lancaster, Pennsylvania, U.S.
- Died: February 26, 2017 (aged 88) Colorado Springs, Colorado, U.S.
- Education: Princeton University; Yale University; University of Pittsburgh

Bernard Schroder Adams (July 20, 1928 – February 26, 2017) was an American academic who was president of Ripon College from 1966 to 1985 and Fort Lewis College from 1985 to 1987.

== Early life ==
Adams was born on July 20, 1928 in Lancaster, Pennsylvania to Professor M. Ray Adams and Charlotte Schroder Adams. He played Center for the Princeton Tigers men's basketball team from 1947 to 1949 and averaged 12.2 points per game over 68 games. He won the B. Franklin Bunn Trophy, awarded to the team's most valuable player, in 1949 and was team captain his senior season. He was also senior class president and was awarded the M. Taylor Pyne Honor Prize, the highest undergraduate honor. In 1951, he earned his master of arts degree from Yale University on a Woodrow Wilson Fellowship. He then spent two years as a first lieutenant in the United States Air Force.

== Academia ==
In 1954, Adams returned to Princeton as assistant director of admissions. In 1957, he became the director of admissions at the University of Pittsburgh. In 1964, he was named dean of students at Oberlin College. From 1966 to 1985, Adams was the president of Ripon College. In 1985, he was appointed president of Fort Lewis College by the Colorado Board of Agriculture. On November 17, 1986, he announced he would be leaving the school at the end of the fall trimester and would officially resign when his contract expired on July 1.

== Later life ==
In 1988, Adams moved to Colorado Springs, Colorado to be closer to family. He spent many years as vice president for Goodwill Industries. He also served as a leader in his church and was a member of various non-profit boards. He died on February 26, 2017.
