= 2011 SEC women's basketball tournament =

American college basketball postseason tournament

- Classification: Division I
- Teams: 12
- Site: Bridgestone Arena; Nashville, Tennessee
- Champions: Tennessee Lady Volunteers (15th title)
- Winning coach: Pat Summitt (15th title)
- MVP: Shekinna Stricklen (Tennessee)
- Attendance: 42,140
- Television: Fox Sports South (first round and quarterfinals), ESPNU (semifinals), ESPN2 (championship game)

2010–11 SEC women's basketball standings
	Conf.				Overall
Team	W		L	PCT	W		L	PCT
No. 4 Tennessee^{†}	16	–	0	1.000	34	–	3	.919
No. 17 Kentucky	11	–	5	.688	25	–	9	.735
Vanderbilt	10	–	6	.625	20	–	12	.625
Georgia	10	–	6	.625	23	–	11	.676
South Carolina	8	–	8	.500	18	–	15	.545
Auburn	8	–	8	.500	16	–	16	.500
LSU	8	–	8	.500	19	–	13	.594
Florida	7	–	9	.438	20	–	15	.571
Arkansas	6	–	10	.375	22	–	12	.647
Alabama	5	–	11	.313	18	–	15	.545
Mississippi State	4	–	12	.250	13	–	17	.433
Ole Miss	3	–	13	.188	10	–	19	.345
† 2011 SEC tournament winner Rankings from AP poll

The 2011 SEC women's basketball tournament took place at the Bridgestone Arena in Nashville, Tennessee from March 3–6, 2011. The Tennessee Lady Volunteers won the tournament and received the SEC's automatic bid to the 2011 NCAA women's basketball tournament by defeating the Kentucky Wildcats 90–65 in the championship game.

== Seeds ==
All SEC schools played in the tournament. Teams were seeded by their 2010–11 SEC season record, with a tiebreaker system to seed teams with identical conference records. Unlike men's basketball play, SEC women's play is not conducted in a divisional format; all 12 teams are organized in a single table. The top four teams on the regular-season table received byes.

== Seeds ==
All teams in the conference participated in the tournament. Teams were seeded by their conference record.

Seed	School	Conference record	Overall record	Tiebreaker
1	Tennessee^{‡†}	16–0	34–3	
2	Kentucky^{†}	11–5	25–9	
3	Vanderbilt^{†}	10–6	20–12	
4	Georgia^{†}	10–6	23–11	
5	South Carolina^{†}	8–8	18–15	
6	Auburn^{†}	8–8	16–16	
7	LSU	8–8	19–13	
8	Florida	7–9	20–15	
9	Arkansas	6–10	22–12	
10	Alabama	5–11	18–15	
11	Mississippi State	4–12	13–17	
12	Ole Miss	3–13	10–19	
‡ – SEC regular season champions, and tournament No. 1 seed. † – Received a bye in the conference tournament. Overall records include all games played in the SEC Tournament.

== Schedule ==
Session	Game	Time*	Matchup^{#}	Television	Attendance
First Round - Thursday, March 3
1	1	1:00 pm	#9 Arkansas vs. #8 Florida	Fox Sports South	3,519
1	2	3:30 pm	#10 Alabama vs. #7 LSU	Fox Sports South	3,519
2	3	7:30 pm	#12 Ole Miss vs. #5 South Carolina	Fox Sports South	3,827
2	4	10:00 pm	#11 Mississippi State vs #6 Auburn	Fox Sports South	3,827
Quarterfinals - Friday, March 4
3	5	1:00 pm	#8 Florida vs. #1 Tennessee	Fox Sports South	7,461
3	6	3:30 pm	#7 LSU vs. #2 Kentucky	Fox Sports South	7,461
4	7	7:30 pm	#5 South Carolina vs. #4 Georgia	Fox Sports South	5,976
4	8	10:00 pm	#11 Mississippi State vs. #3 Vanderbilt	Fox Sports South	5,976
Semifinals - Saturday, March 5
5	9	4:00 pm	#1 Tennessee vs #4 Georgia	ESPNU	10,207
5	10	6:30 pm	#2 Kentucky vs. #3 Vanderbilt	ESPNU	10,207
Championship Game - Sunday, March 6
6	11	5:30 pm	#1 Tennessee vs #2 Kentucky	ESPN2	11,150
*Game Times in ET. #-Rankings denote tournament seeding.

== 2011 SEC tournament ==
First round March 3 FSN
8	Florida	68
9	Arkansas	59
5	South Carolina	63
12	Ole Miss	50
7	LSU	63
10	Alabama	36
6	Auburn	47
11	Mississippi State	49

Second round March 4 FSN
1	Tennessee	92
8	Florida	75
4	Georgia	66
5	South Carolina	34
2	Kentucky	60
7	LSU	58
3	Vanderbilt	69
11	Mississippi State	55

Semifinals; March 5 ESPNU
1	Tennessee	82
4	Georgia	58
2	Kentucky	69
3	Vanderbilt	56

SEC Championship Game; March 6 ESPN2
1	Tennessee	90
2	Kentucky	65
