= 1949–50 Kentucky Wildcats men's basketball team =

1949–50 season of University of Kentucky men's basketball team

1949–50 Kentucky Wildcats men's basketball

SEC regular season champions SEC tournament champions

National Invitation Tournament 2nd Round
- Conference: Southeast Conference

Ranking
- AP: No. 3
- Record: 25–5 (11–2 SEC)
- Head coach: Adolph Rupp
- Assistant coach: Harry Lancaster
- Captain: Dale Barnstable
- Home arena: Alumni Gymnasium

1949–50 Southeastern Conference men's basketball standings
	Conf.				Overall
Team	W		L	PCT	W		L	PCT
No. 3 Kentucky †	11	–	2	.846	25	–	5	.833
Vanderbilt	11	–	3	.786	17	–	8	.680
Auburn	12	–	6	.667	17	–	7	.708
Tulane	8	–	4	.667	15	–	7	.682
Alabama	8	–	9	.471	9	–	12	.429
Georgia	6	–	7	.462	15	–	9	.625
Tennessee	5	–	6	.455	15	–	11	.577
Georgia Tech	7	–	9	.438	14	–	13	.519
LSU	5	–	8	.385	13	–	12	.520
Mississippi State	6	–	10	.375	7	–	11	.389
Florida	4	–	10	.286	9	–	14	.391
Ole Miss	4	–	13	.235	8	–	17	.320
† 1950 SEC Tournament winner Rankings from AP Poll

The 1949–50 Kentucky Wildcats men's basketball team represented University of Kentucky as a member of the Southeast Conference. The head coach was Adolph Rupp and the team played their home games at Alumni Gymnasium for the final season. The Wildcats won SEC regular season and tournament championships. After losing to eventual National Invitation Tournament champion CCNY, Kentucky finished the season with a record of 25–5 (11–2 SEC).

Charles Newton, a player on this squad, returned to Kentucky as athletic director from 1989 to 2000.

== Roster ==
1949–50 Kentucky Wildcats men's basketball team
Players
Coaches

Pos.	#	Name	Height	Weight	Year	Hometown
G/F	18	Dale Barnstable (C)	6 ft 3 in (1.91 m)	175 lb (79 kg)	Sr	Antioch, Illinois
F	19	Walter Hirsch	6 ft 4 in (1.93 m)	175 lb (79 kg)	Jr	Dayton, Ohio
F	25	Jim Line	6 ft 2 in (1.88 m)	185 lb (84 kg)	Sr	Akron, Ohio
F	11	Shelby Linville	6 ft 5 in (1.96 m)	200 lb (91 kg)	So	Middletown, Ohio
G/F	35	Charles Newton	6 ft 2 in (1.88 m)	190 lb (86 kg)	Jr	Fort Lauderdale, Florida
G	31	Leonard Pearson	6 ft 1 in (1.85 m)	180 lb (82 kg)	Sr	Chicago, Illinois
C	77	Bill Spivey	7 ft 0 in (2.13 m)	200 lb (91 kg)	So	Warner Robins, Georgia
G	7	Guy Strong	6 ft 0 in (1.83 m)	165 lb (75 kg)	Jr	Irvine, Kentucky
G	38	Bobby Watson	5 ft 10 in (1.78 m)	155 lb (70 kg)	So	Owensboro, Kentucky
G	32	Lucian Whitaker	6 ft 0 in (1.83 m)	170 lb (77 kg)	So	Sarasota, Florida

Head coach

- Adolph Rupp (Kansas)

Assistant coach(es)

Legend

- (C) Team captain
- (S) Suspended
- (I) Ineligible
- (W) Walk-on
- Injured
- Current redshirt

== Schedule and results ==
Date time, TV	Rank^{#}	Opponent^{#}	Result	Record	Site city, state
Regular Season
Dec 3, 1949		Indiana Central College	W 84–61	1–0	Alumni Gymnasium; Lexington, Kentucky
Dec 10, 1949		Western Ontario	W 90–18	2–0	Alumni Gymnasium; Lexington, Kentucky
Dec 15, 1949*		at St. John's	L 58–69	2–1	Madison Square Garden; New York, New York
Dec 21, 1949*		DePaul	W 49–47	3–1	Jefferson County Armory; Louisville, Kentucky
Dec 23, 1949*		at Purdue	W 60–54	4–1	Lambert Fieldhouse; West Lafayette, Indiana
Dec 29, 1949*		vs. Villanova; Sugar Bowl Classic	W 57–56 ^{OT}	5–1	Municipal Auditorium; New Orleans, Louisiana
Dec 30, 1949*		vs. Bradley; Sugar Bowl Classic	W 71–66	6–1	Municipal Auditorium; New Orleans, Louisiana
Jan 2, 1950*		at Arkansas	W 57–53	7–1	Robinson Auditorium; Little Rock, Arkansas
Jan 4, 1950		Mississippi State	W 87–55	8–1 (1–0)	Owensboro Sportscenter; Owensboro, Kentucky
Jan 9, 1950*	No. 2	North Carolina	W 83–44	9–1	Alumni Gymnasium; Lexington, Kentucky
Jan 14, 1950	No. 2	at Tennessee	L 53–66	9–2 (1–1)	Alumni Memorial Gymnasium; Knoxville, Tennessee
Jan 16, 1950	No. 2	at Georgia Tech	W 61–47	10–2 (2–1)	Heisman Gymnasium; Atlanta, Georgia
Jan 17, 1950	No. 5	at Georgia	L 60–71	10–3 (2–2)	Woodruff Hall; Athens, Georgia
Jan 21, 1950*	No. 5	at DePaul	W 86–53	11–3	Chicago Stadium; Chicago, Illinois
Jan 23, 1950*	No. 5	at Notre Dame	L 51–64	11–4	Notre Dame Fieldhouse; Notre Dame, Indiana
Jan 26, 1950*	No. 4	at Xavier	W 58–47	12–4	Schmidt Fieldhouse; Cincinnati, Ohio
Jan 28, 1950	No. 4	Georgia	W 88–56	13–4 (3–2)	Alumni Gymnasium; Lexington, Kentucky
Jan 30, 1950	No. 4	at Vanderbilt	W 58–54	14–4 (4–2)	McQuiddy Gymnasium; Nashville, Tennessee
Feb 2, 1950	No. 6	at Alabama	W 66–64	15–4 (5–2)	Foster Auditorium; Tuscaloosa, Alabama
Feb 4, 1950	No. 6	vs. Ole Miss	W 61–55	16–4 (6–2)	Ellis Auditorium; Memphis, Tennessee
Feb 11, 1950	No. 7	Tennessee	W 79–52	17–4 (7–2)	Alumni Gymnasium; Lexington, Kentucky
Feb 13, 1950	No. 7	Alabama	W 77–57	18–4 (8–2)	Alumni Gymnasium; Lexington, Kentucky
Feb 15, 1950	No. 5	Ole Miss	W 90–50	19–4 (9–2)	Alumni Gymnasium; Lexington, Kentucky
Feb 18, 1950	No. 5	Georgia Tech	W 97–62	20–4 (10–2)	Alumni Gymnasium; Lexington, Kentucky
Feb 23, 1950*	No. 5	Xavier	W 58–53	21–4	Alumni Gymnasium; Lexington, Kentucky
Feb 25, 1950*	No. 5	Vanderbilt	W 70–66	22–4 (11–2)	Alumni Gymnasium; Lexington, Kentucky
SEC Tournament
Mar 3, 1950*	(1) No. 4	vs. (10) Mississippi State; Second Round	W 56–46	23–4	Jefferson County Armory; Louisville, Kentucky
Mar 4, 1950*	(1) No. 4	vs. (4) Georgia; Semifinal	W 79–63	24–4	Jefferson County Armory; Louisville, Kentucky
Mar 4, 1950*	(1) No. 4	vs. (7) Tennessee; Championship Game	W 95–58	25–4	Jefferson County Armory; Louisville, Kentucky
National Invitation Tournament
Mar 14, 1950*	No. 3	at CCNY; Second Round	L 50–89	25–5	Madison Square Garden; New York, New York
*Non-conference game. ^{#}Rankings from AP poll. (#) Tournament seedings in parentheses.

== Team players drafted into the NBA ==
- No one from the Wildcats men's team was selected in the 1950 NBA draft.
