= 1949–50 NCAA men's basketball rankings =

- Season: 1949–50
- NCAA Tournament: 1950
- NCAA Tournament Champions: CCNY
NCAA men's basketball rankings


The 1949–50 NCAA men's basketball rankings was made up of a single human poll – the AP Poll – with weekly editions released between January 5, 1950 and March 7, 1950.

== Legend ==
	Increase in ranking
	Decrease in ranking
	New to rankings from previous week
Italics	Number of first place votes
(#–#)	Win–loss record
т	Tied with team above or below also with this symbol

== AP Poll ==
	Week 1 Jan. 5	Week 2 Jan. 9	Week 3 Jan. 16	Week 4 Jan. 23	Week 5 Jan. 30	Week 6 Feb. 6	Week 7 Feb. 13	Week 8 Feb. 20	Week 9 Feb. 27	Final Mar. 6	
1.	St. John's (12–1)	St. John's (13–1)	Holy Cross (13–0)	Holy Cross (14–0)	Holy Cross (14–0)	Holy Cross (17–0)	Holy Cross (20–0)	Bradley (24–3)	Bradley (25–3)	Bradley (27–3)	1.
2.	Kentucky (7–1)	Kentucky (8–1)	St. John's (14–1)	Duquesne (13–0)	Duquesne (14–0)	Bradley (19–3)	Bradley (21–3)	Holy Cross (22–0)	Ohio State (18–3)	Ohio State (19–3)	2.
3.	Bradley (10–2)	Long Island (11–1)	Long Island (12–1)	Long Island (13–2)	Bradley (17–3)	Duquesne (16–1)	Ohio State (15–3)	Ohio State (18–3)	Holy Cross (24–0)	Kentucky (24–5)	3.
4.	Long Island (10–1)	Indiana (10–0)	Bradley (14–2)	Kentucky (11–4)	Long Island (14–2)	St. John's (18–2) т	St. John's (20–2)	Duquesne (21–1)	Kentucky (22–4)	Holy Cross (26–1)	4.
5.	Indiana (9–0)	Holy Cross (11–0)	Kentucky (9–2)	St. John's (15–2)	St. John's (16–2)	Ohio State (14–3) т	Kentucky (17–4)	Kentucky (20–4)	Duquesne (22–1)	NC State (24–5)	5.
6.	Holy Cross (9–0)	Bradley (11–2)	Duquesne (12–0)	Bradley (15–3)	Kentucky (13–4)	Long Island (15–2)	Long Island (17–2)	St. John's (20–3)	UCLA (21–4)	Duquesne (22–3)	6.
7.	NC State (9–1)	CCNY (8–2)	CCNY (9–2)	La Salle (11–2)	Ohio State (11–3)	Kentucky (16–4)	Duquesne (18–1)	UCLA (19–4)	Western Kentucky (24–5)	UCLA (22–5)	7.
8.	Duquesne (9–0)	Duquesne (9–0)	Indiana (10–2)	CCNY (9–2)	La Salle (12–2)	NC State (17–3)	NC State (18–4)	Western Kentucky (22–4)	NC State (21–5)	Western Kentucky (24–5)	8.
9.	UCLA (8–3)	NC State (9–2)	UCLA (11–4)	Indiana (12–2)	NC State (15–3)	La Salle (14–2)	Western Kentucky (19–4)	NC State (20–4)	La Salle (18–3)	St. John's (22–4)	9.
10.	Minnesota (7–1)	UCLA (10–3)	La Salle (9–2)	NC State (13–3)	CCNY (10–2)	Kansas State (13–4)	UCLA (17–4)	Long Island (17–3)	St. John's (21–4)	La Salle (20–3)	10.
11.	Saint Louis (6–1)	Minnesota (8–1)	Ohio State (8–2)	UCLA (11–4)	Kansas State (12–3)	Western Kentucky (16–4)	La Salle (14–3)	San Francisco (15–6)	Villanova (22–4)	Villanova (23–4)	11.
12.	Missouri (8–1)	Cincinnati (6–0)	NC State (11–3)	Kansas State (12–3)	Indiana (12–2)	UCLA (15–4)	San Francisco (14–5)	La Salle (16–3)	Kansas State (16–5)	San Francisco (19–6)	12.
13.	Villanova (7–2)	La Salle (7–2)	Kansas State (10–3)	Ohio State (9–3)	UCLA (13–4)	Louisville (20–6)	CCNY (13–3)	Kansas State (16–5)	San Francisco (16–6)	Long Island (20–4)	13.
14.	CCNY (7–2)	Western Kentucky (6–4)	Western Kentucky (9–4)	Wyoming (17–4)	Western Kentucky (14–4)	CCNY (12–2)	Kansas State (13–5)	Toledo (19–4)	Long Island (18–4)	Kansas State (16–6)	14.
15.	Wisconsin (8–2)	Ohio State (6–2)	Tulane (11–2)	Wisconsin (10–3)	Louisville (19–5)	San Francisco (12–5)	Villanova (18–3)	Saint Louis (14–6)	Arizona (24–3)	Arizona (25–4)	15.
16.	Illinois (7–3)	Missouri (9–1)	Minnesota (9–2)	Washington (12–2)	Notre Dame (9–5)	Indiana (13–3)	Washington State (15–9)	USC (18–5)	Nebraska (16–5)	Wisconsin (16–6)	16.
17.	Oklahoma (5–2)	Villanova (8–2)	Tennessee (7–5)	Western Kentucky (12–4)	Wisconsin (10–3)	Washington State (14–8)	Arizona (20–2)	Indiana (16–4)	Toledo (21–5)	San Jose State (21–7)	17.
18.	La Salle (6–2)	Siena (14–0)	Villanova (10–2)	Minnesota (9–2)	Vanderbilt (11–5)	Arizona (17–2)	Saint Louis (13–5)	San Jose State (17–6)	Wyoming (24–5)	Washington State (19–11)	18.
19.	Bowling Green (10–4)	Oklahoma (5–3)	Louisville (14–2)	Villanova (11–2)	Oklahoma A&M (11–4)	Saint Louis (12–5)	USC (13–5)	Arizona (23–2)	San Jose State (18–7)	Kansas (13–9)	19.
20.	Kansas State (9–3)	Washington (12–1)	Cincinnati (7–1)	Illinois (10–4)	Wyoming (18–5)	Hamline (20–1)	Vanderbilt (20–6)	CCNY (14–4)	Vanderbilt (17–7)	Indiana (18–4)	20.
	Week 1 Jan. 5	Week 2 Jan. 9	Week 3 Jan. 16	Week 4 Jan. 23	Week 5 Jan. 30	Week 6 Feb. 6	Week 7 Feb. 13	Week 8 Feb. 20	Week 9 Feb. 27	Final Mar. 6	
		Dropped: Saint Louis; Wisconsin (8–3); Illinois (8–4); Bowling Green; Kansas State (9–3)	Dropped: Missouri; Siena; Oklahoma; Washington	Dropped: Tulane; Tennessee; Louisville; Cincinnati	Dropped: Washington; Minnesota; Villanova; Illinois (10–4)	Dropped: Notre Dame; Wisconsin; Vanderbilt; Oklahoma A&M; Wyoming	Dropped: Louisville; Indiana; Hamline	Dropped: Villanova; Washington State; Vanderbilt	Dropped: Saint Louis; USC; Indiana; CCNY	Dropped: Nebraska; Toledo; Wyoming; Vanderbilt	
