= Spin =

Spin or spinning most often refers to:

- Spin (physics) or particle spin, a fundamental property of elementary particles
- Spin quantum number, a number which defines the value of a particle's spin
- Spinning (textiles), the creation of yarn or thread by twisting fibers together, traditionally by hand spinning
- Spin (geometry), the rotation of an object around an internal axis
- Spin (propaganda), an intentionally biased portrayal of something

Spin, spinning or spinnin may also refer to:

== Physics and mathematics ==
- Spin group, Spin(n), a particular double cover of the special orthogonal group SO(n)
  - the corresponding spin algebra, $\mathfrak{spin}(n)$
- Spin tensor, a tensor quantity for describing spinning motion in special relativity and general relativity
- Spin (aerodynamics), autorotation of an aerodynamically stalled aeroplane
- SPIN bibliographic database, an indexing and abstracting service focusing on physics research

== Textile arts ==
- Spinning (polymers), a process for creating polymer fibres
  - Hand spinning, textile art to create yarn by hand

== Sports ==
- Spin imparted on a ball in sports such as;
  - Cue sports
  - Pickleball
  - Table tennis
  - Tennis
- Indoor cycling, often called spinning, a form of exercise
  - Spinning (cycling), an indoor cycling brand
- SPiN, a chain of tennis table parlors
- Spinning (motorsport), a South African motorsport
- Figure skating spins, a number of different skating moves
- Poi spinning, a form of juggling
- Spin bowling, a type of bowling technique in cricket
- Spin fishing
- Pen spinning
- Spinning, a vertical-axis style of delivery in ten-pin bowling

== Technology ==
- Metal spinning, the process of forming metal over a mandrel while rotating on a lathe
- Chevrolet Spin, a mini multi-purpose vehicle
- Fokker Spin, an aeroplane built by Anthony Fokker

== Computing ==
- SPIN model checker, Gerard Holzmann's tool for formal verification of distributed software systems
- SPIN (operating system), a Mach-like OS written in Modula-3
- Spin (programming language), a high-level programming language
- SPIN (software process), a Software Process Improvement Network
- Busy waiting or spinning

== Books and publications ==
- Spin (magazine), an American music website and print magazine, 1985–present
- Spin (novel), a 2005 novel by Robert Charles Wilson
- Spinning (comics), a 2017 graphic novel memoir by Tillie Walden
- Spin, a 2004 novel by Martin Sixsmith
- Spin (DC Comics), a fictional villain from DC Comics
- Spin (回転, Kaiten), a supernatural ability used in the manga series JoJo's Bizarre Adventure
- Spin (website), a Philippine sports website operated by Summit Media

== Businesses ==
- SPIN (cable system) or South Pacific Island Network
- Spin (company), an American scooter-sharing system
- SPiN, a chain of table tennis lounges

== Film and TV ==
=== Films ===
- Spin (1995 film), a documentary film
- Spin (2003 film), a film by James Redford
- Spin, a 2010 short film by Max Hattler
- Spin (2015 film), a short film directed by Noah Workman and written by Wilson Cleveland
- Spin (2021 film), a film starring Avantika Vandanapu and directed by Manjari Makijany

=== Television ===
- Spin (TV series) or Les Hommes de l'ombre, a 2012 French political drama series
- "Spin" (Charlie Jade), a 2005 episode of the science fiction television program Charlie Jade
- "Spin" (House), a 2005 episode of the American medical drama television series House
- Spin, an anthropomorphic globe character that narrates the Really Wild Animals television series, 1993–1996
- Spin City, a 1996–2002 American sitcom television
- Miles Morales, also known as Spin in the 2021 television series Spidey and His Amazing Friends

== Music ==
- Spin (radio), a single play of a song
- Spinnin' Records, a Dutch electronic music label

=== Groups ===
- SPiN (band), an American alternative rock / power pop band
- Sp!n, a British rock band
- Spin, a Dutch funk band, an offshoot of Ekseption

=== Albums ===
- Spin (Darren Hayes album), 2002
- Spin (Tigers Jaw album), 2017
- Spin, a 1976 album by Spin, an offshoot band of Ekseption
- Spin, a 1985 album by Scullion
- Spin, a 2001 album by Eric Roche
- The Spin, a 1989 album by Yellowjackets

=== Songs ===
- "Spin" (song), a 2002 song by Lifehouse
- "Spin (Everybody's Doin' It)", a 2002 song by Vanessa Amorosi
- "Spinning" (song), a 2021 song by No Rome, Charli XCX and the 1975
- "Spin", a song by Trey Anastasio from the album Shine, 2005
- "Spin", a song by Taking Back Sunday from the album Louder Now, 2006* "Spinning", a song by Christopher Cross and Valerie Carter from the album Christopher Cross, 1979
- "Spinning", a song by Jack's Mannequin from the album The Glass Passenger, 2008
- "Spinning", a song by Transatlantic from the album The Whirlwind, 2009
- "Spinnin'", a song by Soul Asylum from the album And the Horse They Rode In On, 1990
- "Spinnin", a song by Onefour and Nemzzz from Look at Me Now, 2025
- "SPIN", a song performed by the band Kroi and used in the opening for Steel Ball Run: JoJo's Bizarre Adventure, 2026

== Other uses ==
- Spin (b-boy move)
- Spinning (IPO), a form of financial bribery used by brokerages to gain corporate business
- Spins, a state of dizziness and disorientation due to intoxication ("the spins")
- Social Phobia Inventory or SPIN, a psychological test of social anxiety disorder
- Article spinning, a SEO approach of using equivalent phrases to rewrite articles
- Road agent's spin or "Curly Bill spin", a gunfighting maneuver utilized as a ruse when forced to surrender a side arm to an unfriendly party
- Wheelspin, spinning the wheels of a vehicle in place
- Spinnerbait, a type of fishing lure
- Sufi spinning, a twirling meditation

== See also ==
- Flat spin (disambiguation)
- Spin-off (disambiguation)
- Spun (disambiguation)
- Tailspin (disambiguation)
- Twirling
