= Twirl =

Twirl may refer to:

- TWIRL, The Weizmann Institute Relation Locator, a hypothetical hardware device
- Twirl (chocolate bar), a brand of chocolate bar manufactured by Cadbury
- Twirl (film), a 1981 movie about baton twirlers starring Erin Moran
- Earl Williams (basketball player) (born 1951), American-Israeli basketball player
- Angular impulse, the change in angular momentum or the angular analog of impulse

== See also ==
- Twirling
- Spin (disambiguation)
