= Baton twirling =

Sport

- Twirling baton, 2010
- First contested: Europe and Asia, 19th century

Characteristics
- Contact: No
- Mixed-sex: Yes
- Type: Gymnastic sport
- Equipment: Baton

Presence
- Country or region: Worldwide
- Olympic: No
- Paralympic: No
- World Games: 1993 (invitational)

Baton twirling is a sport that combines dance and color guard to create coordinated routines. Instead of such implements as a flag, rifle, sabre, or other props, it requires a "baton" which is a metal rod, typically just slightly larger than one's dominant arm. The sport can be seen in national and international competitions including the USA Junior Olympics.

== Description ==
Twirling combines dance, agility, coordination, and flexibility while manipulating a single or multiple batons. It is a sport that is played worldwide. Musical tunes typically accompany a performance. There are various types of baton twirlers. Majorettes twirl in a group for a high school or college with its marching band. A twirler may perform as part of a group that marches in a parade or front of an audience. Competitive twirlers may compete solo or as part of a group.

Baton twirling requires specific knowledge of manipulating the baton and where to hold the baton. Twirlers can start learning the skills as early as age 2, but usually start in grade school, although some begin as late as high school.

The baton can be described as a rod, typically a lightweight metal such as aluminum, with weighted, resilient ends, typically rubber stoppers. The baton's rubber ends attach to the rod and can be replaced. On one end, there is a large tip called the ball. On the other end, there is a small tip called the tip. The baton must be balanced at its center point.

The rod can be one of several thicknesses. Thicker, heavier rods are said to be better for rolling, while thinner ones are better for finger rolls. The rubber ends can have different designs or weights depending on the manufacturer. Common types are the star, tulip, and simple round tips. The length of the baton from tip to tip should be one inch longer than the distance from the user's armpit to the tip of the user's middle finger. The baton is manipulated from three positions, depending on the trick: from the ball, one hand from the tip, and mostly from the center of the baton.

The baton rod is wrapped with tape for decoration or added grip, using tape specially employed for that purpose. The tape can be anything from electrical tape to tennis tape.

In addition to twirling baton(s), twirlers are known for manipulating multiple pieces of equipment, including fire baton(s), machetes, fire machetes, hoop batons, streamers, flag batons, swing batons, rifle, lighted batons, double flag baton, glow batons, and sabers.

All equipment used by twirlers of the NBTA, USTA, and WBTF is show-quality equipment engineered to be easily manipulated in a twirling routine. Therefore, the rifle, saber, and machetes are not real weapons, but props created specifically for twirling. However, fire batons are, in fact, real flaming batons. The twirler will soak the ends of the fire batons overnight in a flammable substance, commonly kerosene, tiki oil, or gasoline. After the ends are soaked, the twirler must shake off any excess liquid. Finally, the ends of the baton can be set on fire using a lighter. After the twirler has finished performing, the flames can be put out by tossing the baton very fast or placing it in a fire blanket.

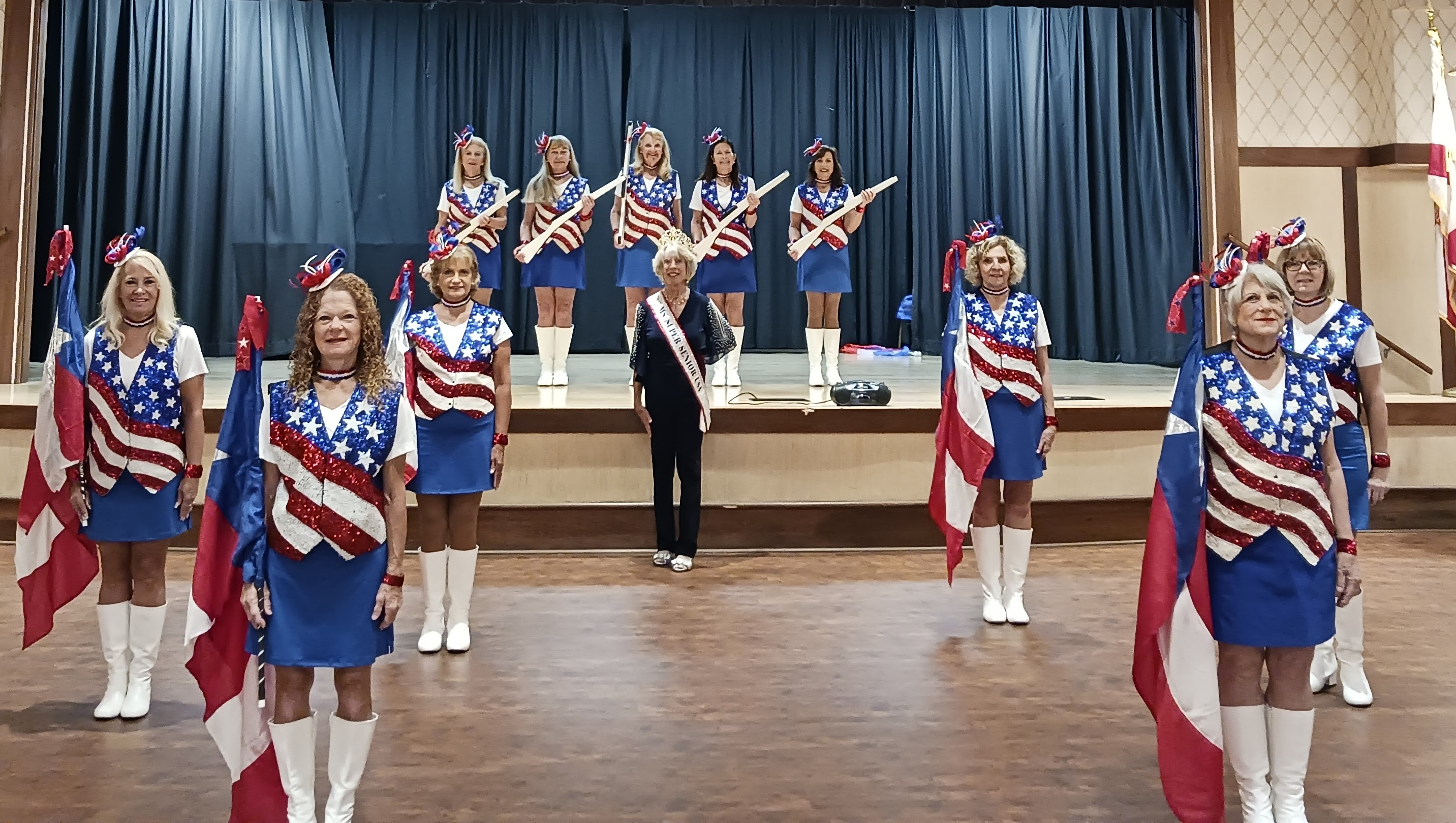
A twirling group called The Prime Time Twirlers in The Villages, Florida

Baton twirling requires coordination and control of the human body. Additionally, it requires flexibility to execute baton, dance, and gymnastics elements properly.

The foundation of baton twirling is the thumb toss. This trick is accomplished from the middle of the baton. The baton is held in one hand at the waist. The baton is rolled over the thumb, and a slight hand movement lifts it. The thumb toss can be increased in difficulty with one or more spins done under the toss, cartwheels, front walkovers, illusions, or many more tricks. The baton can be tossed from either hand, but proficiency in both hands is preferable. For example, the baton can be caught blind behind the head, at the side, under a kick, under one or both legs, or in an illusion. Other tosses include the open hand toss and flat spin toss.

The sport of baton twirling has many tricks common to all twirlers. The elbow roll is a common trick. Continuous elbow rolls go over one elbow, dip the second elbow, dip at the back, and over the first elbow again. This process can keep going as long as the baton stays in motion. Other common tricks include fishtails, open throats, open neck rolls, mouth rolls, and more.

The routines have a predictable pattern of organization despite a unique organization of tricks based on ability. Typically, the twirlers have an initial routine constructed in each type of routine as they are ready. That routine is changed over and over during their career. For example, in basic march, the twirler places one hand on the left hip and cradles the baton in the other. Next, the twirler lifts the leg into a chair height, bends the leg, and lowers the foot back to the ground to the beat of "Stars and Stripes". Strut is an expansion of the basic march. It also counts the hitting of the foot off the ground based on the beat of "Stars and Stripes", but other dance moves with the coordinated baton are incorporated into its X pattern.

Solo routines need specific music or beat to follow. Instead, the twirler attempts to constantly improve the routine with greater consistent speed, complicated tricks, and improved bodywork. The routine has specific sections from the vertical, horizontal, finger, and roll sections. It can include a walk up and back with poses, but the walk can be a tour jeté, leaps, skip, step ball changes, or a simple march.

Modeling is completed in a T pattern with slow, graceful spins and turns. Depending on contest rules, the routine can be done in a short/party/long dress or costume. Modeling can also include an interview, depending on the contest. Other routines can consist of two batons, three batons, flag batons, show routines, or hoops.

Pageants are a large part of competitive baton twirling. Basic skills pageants are the introductory level, where the contestant performs basic march, modeling, and solo. Beginner and Intermediate pageants include modeling/interview, strut, and solo. Advanced pageants have modeling/interview, show twirl, and solo.

Baton twirlers perform at football games, basketball games, competitions, parades, and other events where entertainment is needed. It is commonly known that after a twirling season has come to an end, each twirling company/studio will host a recital to showcase the talents obtained over the season.

Competitive solo twirlers in the United States compete through several organizations. These organizations include the United States Twirling Association, Twirling Unlimited, Twirltacular, National Baton Twirling Association, and more. Each of these organizations has its own rules.

The United States Twirling Association (USTA) offers only competitive routines unique to this association. Moreover, these routines include L military marching, 32-count presentation, rhythm twirl, freestyle, and show twirl.

Twirling Unlimited, TU, has restrictions on the number of turns and continuous elbow rolls in developmental levels, but they allow gymnastics moves. TU separates the age groups as 0–6, 7–8, 9–11, 12–14, and 15+. The 0–6 and 7–8 age groups are combined for certain events.

The National Baton Twirling Association, NBTA, does not have developmental restrictions but does not permit gymnastics. NBTA age groups are 0–4, 0–6, 7–9, 10–12, 13–15, and 16+. NBTA nations are called America's Youth on Parade, held for 50 years.

AYOP has been held at Notre Dame's Joyce Center for 46 years. The event allows the soloists and groups to qualify for the world competition. AYOP is a week-long event with a mixture of open events and pageants, for which the twirler has to qualify at Miss Majorette state/regional events.

Both organizations' solo events are divided into Novice, Beginner, Intermediate, Advanced, and Elite levels. Advancement is based on a set number of wins.

=== History ===
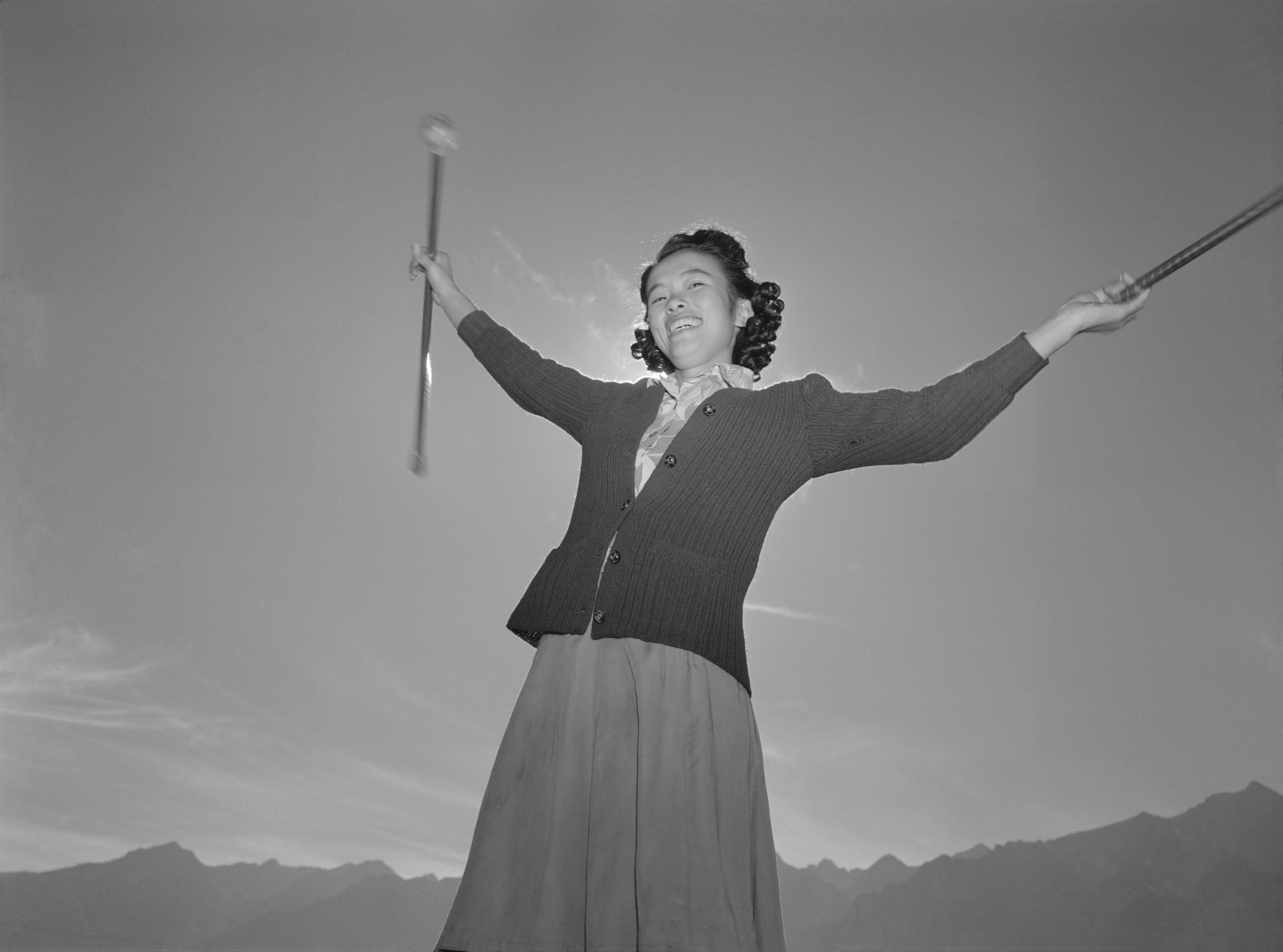
Baton practice, Manzanar War Relocation Center, 1943. Photographed by Ansel Adams.

Baton twirling started in western Europe and Asia.

Although many member countries have their national organizations, at the world level three governing bodies are recognized: the World Baton Twirling Federation (WBTF), the World Twirling Association (WTA), and The Global Alliance of National Baton Twirling & Majorette Associations (NBTA). The WBTF and NBTA host World Championships and the International Cup (WBTF), whereas the WTA continues to honor the sport's origins with additional events that the WBTF does not include. The WTA was founded in 1960, by champion baton twirler Victor Faber.

The WBTF was founded in 1979. Current member countries include Australia, Belgium, Brazil, Canada, Catalonia (Spain), Croatia, England, France, Germany, Hungary, Ireland, Italy, Japan, Netherlands, Norway, Philippines, Scotland, Seychelles, Slovenia, South Africa, Sweden, Switzerland, and the United States.

Current member countries of the NBTA include Belgium, Bulgaria, Canada, Croatia, Czech Republic, England, France, Germany, the Netherlands, Ireland, Italy, Norway, Romania, Russia, Scotland, Slovakia, Slovenia, Spain, Switzerland, Ukraine, and the United States. Under consideration are: Australia, Estonia, Japan, Slovenia, and South Africa.

In 2023 the WBTF and the NBTA Global Alliance began discussions aimed at forming one international federation for the sport. The two groups worked together to conduct events culminating in the first world championships of the International Baton Twirling Federation (IBTF) in 2023.

Japan Baton Twirling Association competitors, 2015

== Competitive baton twirling ==
Competitive baton twirling is classified by two factors, skill, and age. The NBTA, USTA, TU, and WBTF separate twirlers by their skill levels, which range from novice, beginner, intermediate, to advanced, and elite; advancement to the next skill level is determined through the number of first-place wins that the twirler has accomplished against other twirlers. Age groups, skill level, events, and attire can vary from organization to organization.

Wins obtained with no competitors in said division typically do not count toward advancement. Next, the twirlers are classified by their age through a standard scale that is as follows: 0–6, 7–9, 10–12, 13–15, 16–21, 22+. This classification scale ensures that the competition between twirlers in each division is fair.

When competing, a twirler's attire will typically be a leotard or a skater dress that is embellished with sequins, rhinestones, fringe, and other ornate designs. Twirlers are judged on their attire during competition, especially in events such as best in costume, so it is important that they wear a costume that fits properly and looks good during competition. Footwear ranges from tennis shoes, ballet slippers, instep cougars, and jazz shoes, to majorette boots. Typically, instep cougars are seen on both the competition floor and during practice. Jazz shoes are primarily used during competition, as the soft bottoms can easily be torn during practice. It is common to see the heels of jazz shoes covered in rhinestones. Majorette boots can be seen during competition; however, high school and college majorettes typically wear these on the football field and during other performances.

In NBTA, one of the most competitive titles in the twirling field, Miss Majorette, is a title that is given to the top baton twirlers of each state. As mentioned earlier, twirlers will be classified based on their skill and age, which allows for a Miss Majorette title in each rank. When competing for this title, twirlers will begin by competing in T or Circle T Modelling, Interview, Solo, and X- Strut. After a twirler has been named Miss Majorette of their state, they will advance to compete for the title of Miss Majorette of America in their division.

Every year, the ESPN Wide World of Sports Complex hosts Twirlmania international championship competition at Walt Disney World. Competition is available for soloists, teams, high schools, colleges, and recreational groups of any age or gender. Some countries that have participated in the past include the U.S., Japan, Russia, Australia, and England. Competing ranges from baton twirling to pompom and dance. Competitors also get to march in a Disney parade as well as participate in a fun, family-oriented weekend. Awards range from trophies to plush stuffed animals to cash (up to $4,000) and gifts by sponsors. Some categories include Dance Line Team, Collegiate Team, Pom Pom Team, Drill Team, Basic & Military, and Miss Twirl Mania Pageant, to name a few.

== Championship events ==
The World Championships have the following events:

- Freestyle Senior Women & Men
- Junior Women and Men
- Event accompanied by a compulsory/short programme event
  - strut
  - solo
  - dancetwirl or rhythmic twirl
  - pairs or duets
  - trios
  - show corps
- Single baton, 2 batons, 3 batons

Teams, pairs, trios, and show corps can be co-ed.

For several years, the powerhouse countries (France, Italy, Japan, and the United States) have dominated the world championships. In order to promote more events and other smaller countries' ability to have international champions, the International Cup was introduced. Athletes are categorized into B-level athletes, A-level athletes, and elite. The powerhouse countries do not take B-level athletes to give the smaller countries an opportunity to have international champions. Because every country does not have dancetwirl as an event, and because of the variety within the freestyle event, the artistic twirl was introduced to replace freestyle and dancetwirl at the International Cup.

== Competition history ==
Since 2005, the two competitions have been run concurrently over a week. In 2009, the competitions began running separately, with the International Cup falling on uneven years and the World Championships on even years. New events such as Freestyle and Pairs across different age levels and divisions were added to the International Cup.

The following cities have previously hosted the competitions:

Previous Hosts
Year	City	Country	Comment
1980	Seattle	(United States) USA	1st World Championships
1981	Nice	France	
1982	Tokyo	Japan	
1983	Milan	Italy	
1984	Calgary	Canada	
1985	Frankfurt	Germany	
1986	Turin	Italy	
1987	Paris	France	
1988	Nagoya	Japan	
1989	Lausanne	Switzerland	
1990	Texas	(United States) USA	
1991	Padova	Italy	
1992	Paris	France	
1993	Den Bosch	Netherlands	
1994	Toronto	Canada	
1995	Geneva	Switzerland	
1996	Genova	Italy	
1997	Hawaii	(United States) USA	
1998	Lyon	France	
1999	Daytona Beach	(United States) USA	
2000	Den Bosch	Netherlands	
2001	Villebon sur Yvette	France	
2002	Saskatoon	Canada	
2003	Badalona	Spain	
2004	Osaka	Japan	
2005	Minnesota/St. Paul	(United States) USA	1st International Cup begins running concurrently
2006	Rome	Italy	
2007	Hamilton, Ontario	Canada	
2008	Limerick	(Republic of Ireland) Ireland	Last year both competitions will run concurrently - WBTF President Lynda Garland (CAN) retires after 25 years of Service. Sandi Weimers (USA) was elected as WBTF president.
2009	Sydney	Australia	1st lone standing International Cup
2010	Bergen	Norway	1st lone standing World Championships since 2004
2011	Jacksonville, Florida	(United States) USA	(International Cup)
2012	Villebon Sur Yvette	France	(World Championships)

- Solo one baton to music, novice beginner intermediate advanced (levels) 0–6 7–9 10–12 13–15 16+
- Two batons to music, novice beginner intermediate advanced 0–6 7–9 10–12 13–15 16+
- Showtwirl multiple batons with a prop and music novice beginner intermediate advanced 0–6 7–9 10–12 13–15 16+
- Basic march novice beginner intermediate advanced 0–6 7–9 10–12 13–15 16+
- Military march novice beginner intermediate advanced 0–6 7–9 10–12 13–15 16+
- Modeling novice beginner intermediate advanced 0–6 7–9 10–12 13–15 16+

Events and age divisions and levels may vary due to baton association.

Winners by year
2012
- Senior Women – Tomoe Nishigaki (Japan)
- Senior Men – Keisuke Komada (Japan)
- Junior Women – Sayumi Yamamoto (Japan)
- Junior Men – Daichi Fujiwara (Japan)
- Team – France
- Senior pair – France
- Junior Pair – Japan
2010
- Senior Women – Tomoe Nishigaki (Japan)
- Senior Men – Shuichi Kawazu (Japan)
- Junior Women – Sakaya Hongoh (Japan)
- Junior Men – Naoya Moro (Japan)
- Team – Japan
- Senior Pair – Japan
- Junior Pair – Japan
2008
- Senior Women – Yumi Ijima (Japan)
- Senior Men – Toshimichi Sasaki (Japan)
- Junior Women – Sayaka Hongoh (Japan)
- Junior Men – Yuki Aikawa (Japan)
- Team – Japan
- Senior Pair – France
- Junior Pair – Japan
2007
- Senior Women – Yumi Ijima (Japan)
- Senior Men – Toshimichi Sasaki(Japan)
- Junior Women – Mizuki Sako (Japan)
- Junior Men – Yuki Aikawa (Japan)
- Team – Japan
- Senior Pair – Japan
- Junior Pair – Japan
2006
- Senior Women – Chiho Honjo (Japan)
- Senior Men – Toshimichi Sasaki (Japan)
- Junior Women – Tomoe Nishigaki (Japan)
- Junior Men – Keisuke Komada (Japan)
- Team – France
- Senior Pair – Japan
- Junior Pair – Japan
2005
- Senior Women – Chiharu Tachibana (Japan)
- Senior Men – Seishi Inagaki (Japan)
- Junior Women – Tomoe Nishigaki (Japan)
- Junior Men – Keisuke Komada (Japan)
- Team – USA
- Senior Pair – Japan
- Junior Pair – Japan
2004
- Senior Women – Chiho Honjo (Japan)
- Senior Men – Seishi Inagaki (Japan)
- Junior Women – Tomoe Nishigaki (Japan)
- Junior Men – Keisuke Komada (Japan)
- Team – Japan
- Senior Pair – Japan
- Junior Pair – France
2003
- Senior Women – Chiharu Tachibana (Japan)
- Senior Men – Seishi Inagaki (Japan)
- Junior Women – Haruka Izumi (Japan)
- Junior Men – Keisuke Komada (Japan)
- Team – USA
- Senior Pair – Japan
- Junior Pair – Japan
2002
- Senior Women – Hollie Neilson (Canada)
- Senior Men – Seishi Inagaki (Japan)
- Junior Women – Haruka Izumi (Japan)
- Junior Men – Keisuke Komada (Japan)
- Team – USA
- Senior Pair – Japan
- Junior Pair – Japan
2001
- Senior Women – Hollie Neilson (Canada)
- Senior Men – Seishi Inagaki (Japan)
- Junior Women – Yumi Iljima (Japan)
- Junior Men – Manabu Kawaguchi (Japan)
- Team – Japan
- Senior Pair – France
- Junior Pair – Japan
2000
- Senior Women – Hollie Neilson (Canada)
- Senior Men – Seishi Inagaki (Japan)
- Junior Women – Yumi Iljima (Japan)
- Junior Men – Shuichi Kawazu (Japan)
- Team – Japan
- Senior Pair – France
- Junior Pair – Japan
1999
- Senior Women – Noriko Takahashi (Japan)
- Senior Men – Seishi Inagaki (Japan)
- Junior Women – Hollie Neilson (Canada)
- Junior Men – Shuichi Kawazu (Japan)
- Team – Japan
- Senior Pair – Canada
- Junior Pair – Canada
1998
- Senior Women – Noriko Takahashi (Japan)
- Senior Men – Seishi Inagaki (Japan)
- Junior Women – Hollie Neilson (Canada)
- Junior Men – Shuichi Kawazu (Japan)
- Team – Japan
- Senior Pair – Japan
- Junior Pair – Japan
1997
- Senior Women – Annetta Lucero (USA)
- Senior Men – Seishi Inagaki (Japan)
- Junior Women – Akemi Kimura (Japan)
- Junior Men – Jason Lee (USA)
- Team – Japan
- Senior Pair – Japan
- Junior Pair – Japan
1996
- Senior Women – Chiara Stefanazzi (Italy)
- Senior Men – Seishi Inagaki (Japan)
- Junior Women – Akemi Kimura (Japan)
- Junior Men – Gregory Thinet (France)
- Team – France
- Senior Pair – Japan
- Junior Pair – Japan
1995
- Senior Women – Noriko Takahaski (Japan)
- Senior Men – Seishi Inagaki (Japan)
- Junior Women – Aiko Hamada (Japan)
- Junior Men – Gregory Thinet (France)
- Team – Japan
- Senior Pair – Japan
- Junior Pair – Japan
1994
- Senior Women – Noriko Takahaski (Japan)
- Senior Men – Mark Nash (USA)
- Junior Women – Alysha Depp (USA)
- Junior Men – Toshimichi Sasaki (Japan)
- Team – Japan
- Senior Pair – France
- Junior Pair – Japan
1993
- Senior Women – Stacy Singer (Canada)
- Senior Men – Kevan Latrace (Canada)
- Junior Women – Chiara Stefanazzi (Italy)
- Junior Men – Seishi Inagaki (Japan)
- Team – USA
- Senior Pair – Japan
- Junior Pair – Japan
1983
- World Open Solo – Melaine Cancellari (USA)

== International Cup ==
Year	Event	Winner	Country
2009	Elite Junior Men	Yoshimaru Shirakawa	Japan
2009	A Junior Men	Matthew Johnson	Canada
2009	B Junior Men	Curt Burrows	USA
2009	Elite Senior Men	Keisuke Komada	Japan
2009	A Senior Men	Jack Giordano	USA
2009	Elite Adult Men	Schuichi Kawazu	Japan
2009	A Adult Men	David Doyne	Ireland
2009	Elite Junior Women	Yukako Shingu	Japan
2009	A Junior Women	Blinera Sallitolli	Catalonia, Spain
2009	B Junior Women	Jamie Hogan	USA
2009	Elite Senior Women	Tomoe Nishigaki	Japan
2009	A Senior Women	Torri Cicchirillo	USA
2009	B Senior Women	Catreena Hale	USA
2009	Elite Adult Women	Arisa Tanaka	Japan
2009	A Adult Women	Kyla Wilson	Canada
2009	B Adult Women	Aryn Bigler	USA

== Special Athlete's Award ==
In 1998, the WBTF introduced the Special Athlete's Award of Recognition for athletes that competed at 10+ World Championships. Not all are Champions.

Year	Winner	Country
2008	Carina van Beers	The Netherlands
2008	Joaquin Bermudez	Catalonia, Spain
2007	David Doyne	Ireland
2007	Shuichi Kawazu	Japan
2007	Toshimichi Sasaki	Japan
2005	Akemi Kimura	Japan
2005	Kathy Hewitt	England
2003	Chiharu Tachiban	Japan
2003	Kellie Donovan	USA
2003	Sebastien Dubois	France
2003	Tamara Hoevenaars	The Netherlands
2002	Elissa Johnson	USA
2002	Emery Harriston	USA
2001	Bridgette Bartley	USA
2001	Chiara Stefanazzi	Italy
2001	Elin Hjartaaker	Norway
2001	Jenny Hannah	USA
2001	Mark Nash	USA
2000	Bertrand Royer	France
1999	Christian Altenburger	Switzerland
1999	Celine Tanner-Imhof	Switzerland
1999	Chiho Honjo	Japan
1999	Christian De Backer	Belgium
1999	Kevan Latrace	Canada
1999	Lucinda McMaster	Canada
1999	Noriko Takahashi	Japan
1999	Toshimichi Sasaki	Japan

== Federation ==
The World Baton Twirling Federation (WBTF) was founded in 1979 to promote the sport of baton twirling worldwide. Its first world championships held in Seattle in 1980.

In 2023 the WBTF and the NBTA Global Alliance began discussions aimed at forming one international federation for the sport. The two groups worked together to conduct events culminating in the first world championships of the International Baton Twirling Federation (IBTF) in 2023.
