= SPN =

SPN may refer to:

== Places ==
- Saipan International Airport (IATA airport code: SPN), Saipan
- Shahjahanpur railway station (station code: SPN), Uttar Pradesh, India
- Spooner Row railway station (National Rail station code: SPN), South Norfolk, England
- Spree-Neisse station (station code: SPN), Brandenburg, Germany; see List of railway stations in Frankfurt

== Telecommunications, computing, cryptography ==
- Shortest job next, or shortest process next
- Service Principal Name (SPN), used in the Kerberos protocol
- Service provider name, stored on mobile phone subscriber identity module (SIM)
- Substitution–permutation network, a mathematical operation used in cipher algorithms
- Sum-Product Networks, a type of probabilistic machine learning model

== Other uses ==
- Sanapaná language (ISO 639 code: spn)
- Sp(n), a type of symplectic group in mathematics
- Savanna Pastoral Neolithic, a culture and collection of societies in the archaeological record of the Rift Valley
- State Policy Network, a U.S. national network of conservative and libertarian think tanks
- Scientific pitch notation, a method to specify musical pitch
- Solitary pulmonary nodule, or coin lesion in the lung
- CD43 or SialoPhoriN, a protein
- Supramolecular polymer networks
- Shorthand for the TV show Supernatural
- Swiss Pool for the Insurance of Nuclear Risks
- Serbia Against Violence, a Serbian political coalition
- Nunavik Police Service (acronym of the French name, Service de police du Nunavik)

== See also ==
- Sp!n
- Spin (disambiguation)
