= Lafayette High School (New York City) =

Public school in New York City

Coordinates: 40°35′37″N 73°59′10″W

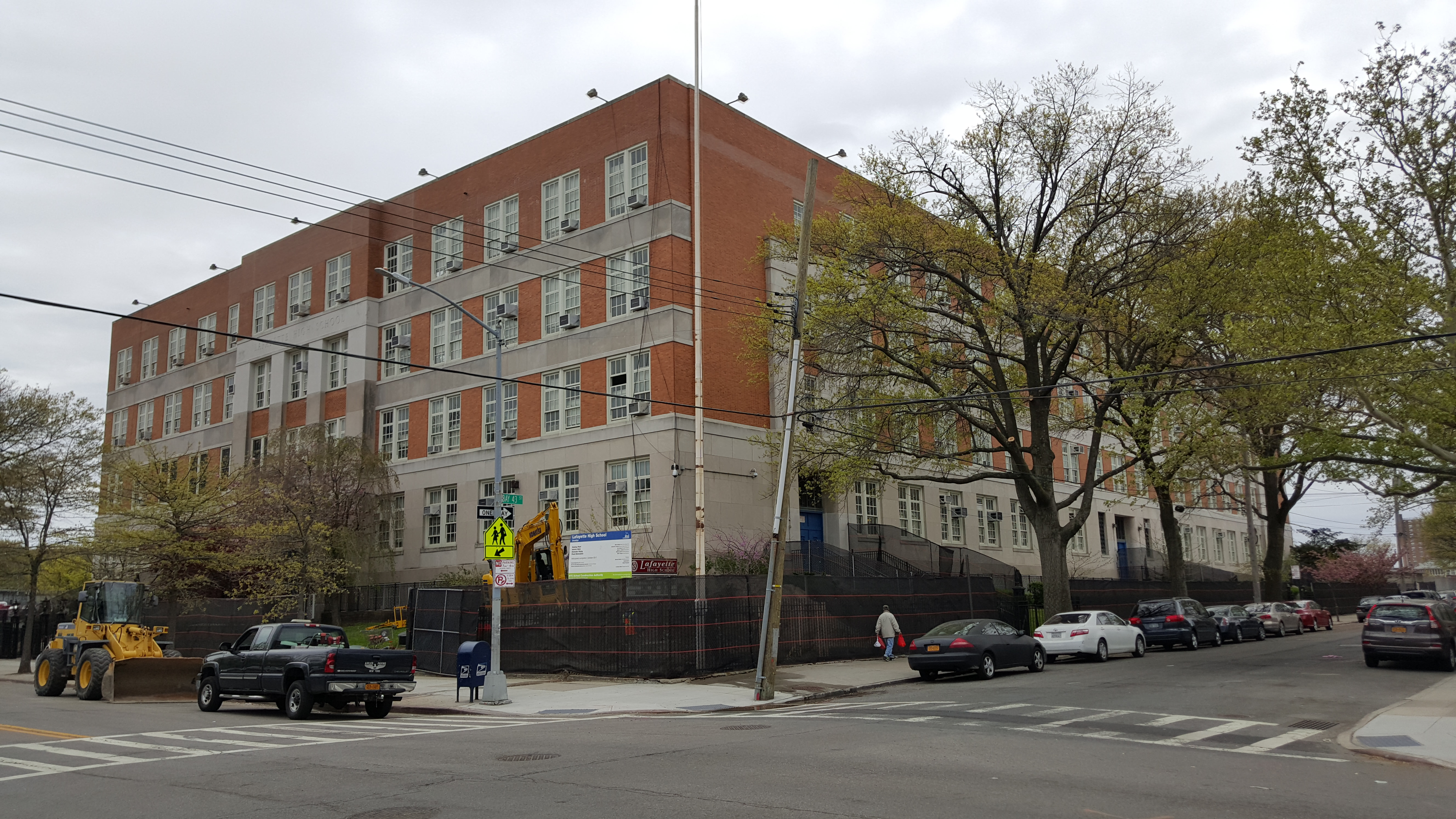

Location
- 2630 Benson Avenue; New York City (Bath Beach, Brooklyn), New York 11214; United States

Information
- Type: Public
- Established: 1939
- Closed: 2010
- Grades: 9-12
- Colors: Maroon; White
- Team name: Frenchies
- Yearbook: Legend

Lafayette High School was a large secondary school located in the Bath Beach section of Brooklyn, New York. It closed in 2010.

== History ==
Named after Gilbert du Motier, Marquis de Lafayette, Lafayette High School is situated in what was formerly the town of Gravesend. All the towns in Kings County were settled by the Dutch with the exception of Gravesend, which was first settled by a colony of English people under the leadership of Lady Deborah Moody, a woman of considerable wealth and education, who took a prominent part in public affairs, and whose home was on Neck Road. According to the New York City Ward Map of Kings County in 1899, the school is located on the former property of John Carter. This map reveals a frame house with stables on the site of the building. The land was originally swampy, sandy soil covering about 10 acres (40,000 m^{2}).

Lafayette High School, the first building of its type, was designed to accommodate about 4,000 pupils. The cost of the site was $211,350 while the building itself necessitated an outlay of $2,820,000. There are two other high schools in the city, which are duplicates of this type – Christopher Columbus and William Cullen Bryant. Dr. Frederick William Oswald was asked to assume the principalship of the new school. As the new building was not ready, the school had to meet in three annexes. These annexes were P.S. 180, with Mr. Joseph Grady in charge, assisted by Mr. Freilich and Mr. Abraham Margolies; P.S. 126, under the direction of Miss Dorothy K. Lewis and Mr. Robert Buda; and P.S. 192 with Mr. Walter Jacobsen in charge. In March 1939, the faculty had been increased to 156 members and the student population numbered some 4,500 boys and girls. On November 13, 1939, the formal exercises dedicating Lafayette High School took place in the auditorium. Among those present was Mayor Fiorello H. LaGuardia.

As measured by graduation rates, Lafayette's performance was low: 44.4 percent of the class of 2006 graduated on time. and a 63.2 percent 7-year graduation rate.

Lafayette has experienced criminal activity involving their students. Extra police officers and security guards were added when the New York City Department of Education labeled it an "Impact School". After some improvement, in April 2006, Lafayette was removed from the Impact list. In December 2006, New York City's plans to close Lafayette High School were announced, along with four other low-performing schools that failed to improve under city guidance. Applying a strategy of the Bloomberg administration, the large closed schools would each be replaced by several small schools with about 400 or 500 students each.

Principal Jolanta Rohloff stepped down on March 30, 2007, and was replaced by Doris Unger, to oversee the closing of the school, having previously overseen the closing of Seward Park High School. Principal Rohloff was praised by Department of Education officials for her work attempting to turn around the school, but criticized by the community, teachers, and students for heavy-handiness She was assigned by the Department of Education to mentor principals and teachers on how to interpret student performance data and make necessary adjustments to instruction. On September 15, 2008, a press release stated that Ms. Doris Unger had been promoted to superintendent. On September 19, 2008, it was announced to the staff at Lafayette HS that the assistant principal, Jacqueline Boswell would be the new principal.

The school closed in 2010 after struggling for years with safety issues and a low graduation rate, and was divided into five smaller schools, known collectively as the Lafayette Educational Complex. The five schools were: Kingsborough Early College Secondary School; Lafayette International High School; High School of Sports Management, Life Academy High School for Film and Music, and Bronx Expeditionary Learning High School. Bronx Expeditionary Learning High School is now Bronx Collegiate Academy and is one of a collection of specialist schools at the William H. Taft campus in the former William Howard Taft High School.

== Notable alumni ==
Of all high schools in New York State, Lafayette has the most alumni, 13, who reached the Major League Baseball.

- Bob Aspromonte, baseball player brother of Ken
- Ken Aspromonte, baseball player brother of Bob
- Angelo Badalamenti, composer
- Kevin Baez, baseball player
- Tony Balsamo, baseball player
- Sal Campisi, baseball player
- Herb Cohen, author, negotiator
- Alex Coletti, producer
- Vic Damone, singer
- Benny Distefano, baseball player
- Jeffrey Epstein, convicted sex offender and financier
- Jerry Della Femina, author, restaurateur, advertising agent
- Pete Falcone, baseball player
- Al Ferrara, baseball player
- Joel H. Ferziger, professor, engineer, author
- Mike Fiore, baseball player
- John Franco, baseball player
- Mike Garson, musician
- Gary David Goldberg, producer and sitcom creator
- Eugène Green, novelist, playwright, film maker
- Wally Green, table tennis player
- Morton Halperin, national security analyst and civil libertarian
- Fred Hellerman, singer, songwriter
- Robert Kerman, actor
- Jeffrey Kessler, sports and antirust lawyer
- Larry King, journalist and talk show host
- Sandy Koufax, baseball player, member of the Baseball Hall of Fame
- Richard LaGravenese, screenwriter
- Ken Lerner, actor
- Michael Lerner, actor
- Dave Liebman, musician
- Luis Lopez, baseball player
- Norm Mager basketball player
- Peter Max, artist
- Art Metrano, actor
- Larry Merchant, sportswriter
- Theodore Millon, psychologist, author
- Vickie Natale, singer, songwriter, and CBS Star Search champion
- Eric Ober, President of CBS News
- Rochelle Owens, poet and playwright
- Rhea Perlman, actress
- Archie Rand, artist
- Steve Schirripa, actor and author
- Maurice Sendak, artist
- Paul Sorvino, actor
- Elliott Stein, film critic and historian
- Michael Steinhardt, financier
- Frank P. Tomasulo, film professor and journal editor
- Fred Wilpon, former New York Mets owner
- Larry Yellen, baseball player
- Walter Zanger, journalist and author
- Sabac Red, rapper and member of Non-Phixion
