= Rockstar Games Presents Table Tennis =

2006 table tennis simulation video game

- Developer: Rockstar San Diego (Note: Wii port developed by Rockstar Leeds)
- Publisher: Rockstar Games
- Director: Daren Bader
- Producer: Darion Lowenstein
- Designer: Benjamin Johnson
- Programmer: Wil Paredes
- Artists: Jody Pileski; Ted Bradshaw
- Engine: RAGE
- Platforms: Xbox 360; Wii
- Release: Xbox 360: NA: May 23, 2006; PAL: May 26, 2006; Wii: NA: October 16, 2007; PAL: October 19, 2007
- Genre: Sports
- Modes: Single-player, multiplayer

Rockstar Games Presents Table Tennis is a 2006 table tennis simulation video game developed by Rockstar San Diego and published by Rockstar Games. The game is a realistic simulation of the sport table tennis, with the main objective to make the opponent fail to hit the ball.

The game features various methods of serving and returning the ball, designed for players to beat their opponent. Players can compete against the game's artificial intelligence, while the game's multiplayer mode lets two players compete in matches, either through local multiplayer or online. Initially developed specifically for the Xbox 360 console, the development team took advantage of the hardware's graphical power, allowing the game to play at a faster pace than with previous hardware. The game was the first to be developed using Rockstar's proprietary Rockstar Advanced Game Engine. The game was released for the Xbox 360 in May 2006 and for the Wii in October 2007.

Its announcement in March 2006 led to confusion and surprise, due to its significantly different style from Rockstar's previous projects. It received generally positive reviews upon release, with praise particularly directed at its simplicity, replayability and detailed visuals.

== Gameplay ==
Rockstar Games Presents Table Tennis is a realistic simulation of the sport of table tennis. In the game, two players hit a ball back and forth from one another. The goal of the game is to make the opponent fail to return the ball. Players have the ability to challenge a multiplayer partner, either offline or online, or can select to challenge the game's artificial intelligence. Players can select from a roster of eleven characters, which are unlocked as they progress through the game; each character has particular skills in different areas.

Players challenge opponents in competitive matches, serving and returning the ball in order to score points.

The game features two modes: Tournament, which involves players participating against a variety of players in different circuits; and Exhibition, which involves players challenging individual opponents in non-ranked matches. When preparing to serve the ball, players enter a stance. During this stance, players aim the ball, followed by selecting the amount of spin and power to place on the ball, as indicated by the spin meter.

Players can also place a level of spin on their ball, curving it in a different direction. After the opponent returns the ball, players have the ability to "charge" their shots. As the shots are charged, the Focus meter increases; when the meter fills, players enter the Full Focus state, in which their shots are faster and more accurate. Players can also perform soft shots and smashes, respectively decreasing and increasing the speed of the ball, and Focus Shots, high-powered returns that help players counter difficult shots.

The Wii port of the game offers three different control schemes: Standard, using the Wii Remote; Sharp Shooter, in which the player flicks the Nunchuk's analog stick instead of the Wii Remote to aim and hit the ball; and Control Freak, using the Nunchuk's analog stick to control the player's position.

== Development ==
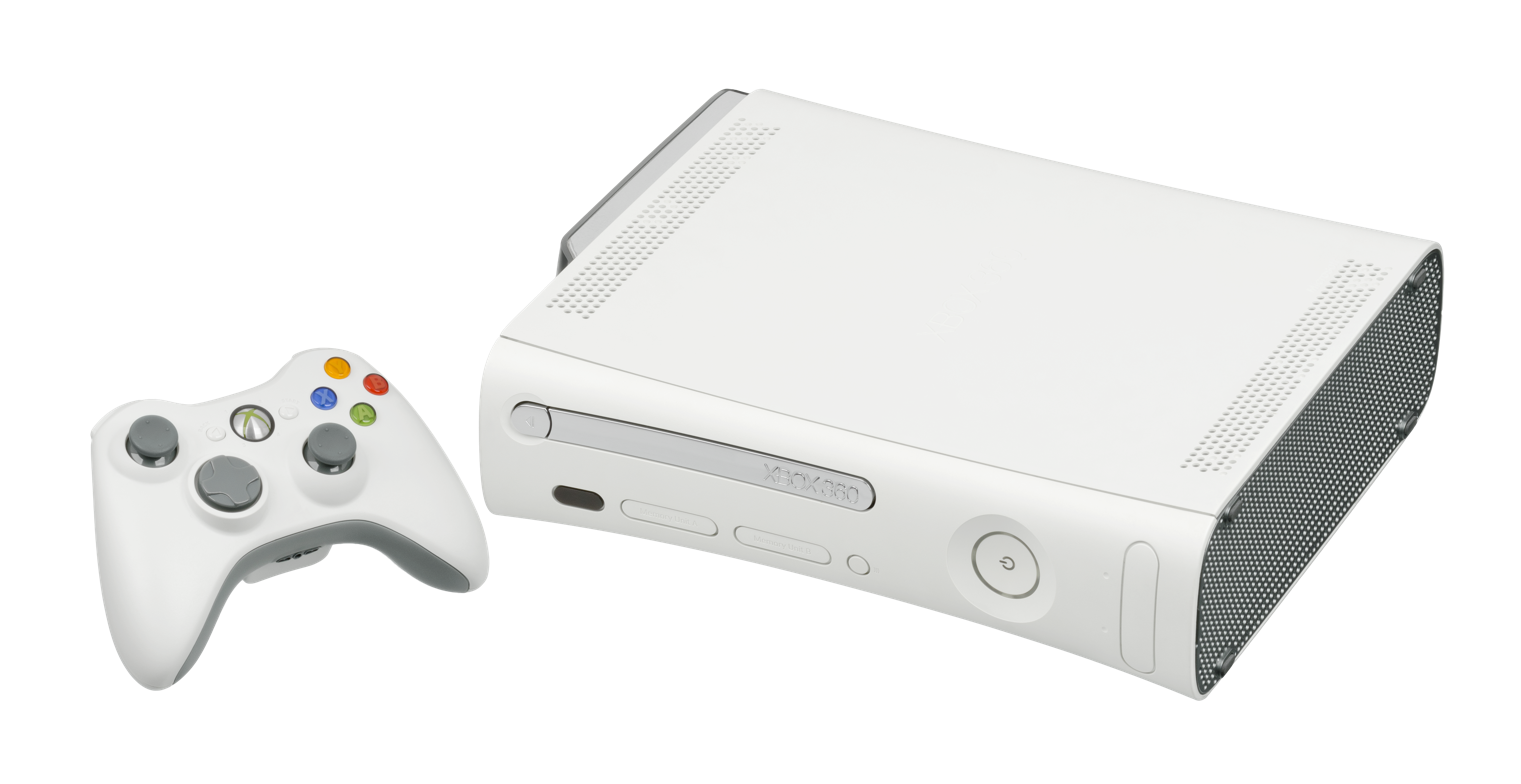
Rockstar Games Presents Table Tennis was developed for the Xbox 360. The development team took advantage of the hardware's graphical power, and found that it allowed them to develop games at a faster pace than with previous hardware.

Preliminary work on Rockstar Games Presents Table Tennis began in 2005, prior to the announcement of the Xbox 360, which the game was developed for. Rockstar San Diego, the core team behind the game, found that the hardware allowed them to develop games at a faster pace than with the previous hardware. Rockstar president Sam Houser felt that Rockstar San Diego was a suitable developer for the game due to their demonstration of skill in developing advanced engines, particularly early in a console generation, citing Midnight Club: Street Racing and Smuggler's Run (both 2000), which were launch games for the PlayStation 2. Houser also said that, though the game's physics were achievable on the old hardware, the team waited for the possibility to develop for the Xbox 360 due to the "different level of production and technology" that it allowed. In developing the game's concept, the team was fascinated with concentrating the entire power of a particular hardware into one activity. The game runs off the proprietary Rockstar Advanced Game Engine (RAGE), and is the first game to do so.

Network programmer John Gierach found the development of the online multiplayer mode challenging, due to the level of realism the development team attempted to create. In addition, the speed and accuracy required for the game was also a challenge for the team, due to the fast pace of the matches. When discussing the possibility of porting the game to the Wii, the team agreed almost immediately, as they felt that the console was a "perfect fit" for the game. While developing the Wii version, the team particularly considered how to serve all types of players, thus allowing a range of different control schemes.

The game was first announced by Rockstar Games on March 3, 2006. Journalists noted the surprised reactions that the announcement caused within the gaming industry, which they owed to the game's significant difference when compared to Rockstar's reputation of developing mature titles. Following its E3 previews, the game won Best Sports Game from GameSpot and received a nomination from IGN. It was released for the Xbox 360 in North America on May 23, 2006, and in the PAL region on May 26. On July 18, 2007, Rockstar announced that the game would be ported to the Wii, taking advantage of the motion sensing Wii Remote. The Wii version was released in North America on October 16 and in the PAL region on October 19. American table tennis player Wally Green, who performed motion capture for the game, helped promote its release in 2006; Rockstar later sponsored Green on his professional tour.

== Reception ==
Reception

Aggregate score
Aggregator	Score	
Aggregator	Wii	Xbox 360
Metacritic	68/100	81/100

Review scores
Publication	Score	
Publication	Wii	Xbox 360
Edge		7/10
Electronic Gaming Monthly		7.67/10
Eurogamer	8/10	9/10
Game Informer	6/10	8/10
GameSpot	6/10	8.5/10
GameTrailers	6.7/10	7.8/10
IGN	7.8/10	7.8/10
Official Nintendo Magazine	80%	
Official Xbox Magazine (US)		8/10

The Xbox 360 version of Rockstar Games Presents Table Tennis received "generally favorable" reviews, while the Wii version received "average" reviews, according to review aggregator website Metacritic. Reviewers praised its gameplay, detailed visuals, and online multiplayer.

The game's technical aspects received acclaim. IGN's Douglass C. Perry felt the graphics and motion capture are "exceptional" and the animation is "beautiful", and praised the stable frame rate. GameSpot's Ryan Davis wrote the characters were designed with "phenomenal detail", though felt "there's not much else to look at". GamesRadar+'s Dan Amrich commended the player models and lighting effects for putting "the hardware to impressive yet playful use". Tom Orry of VideoGamer.com felt the visuals improved gameplay, particularly applauding smaller details such as the player models and ball physics.

Many reviewers found the gameplay simple yet effective. Perry of IGN called it "deep and addictive" and the controls intuitive. GamesRadar+'s Amrich echoed similar remarks, writing the controls "feel accessible without alienating 'serious' sports gamers", and Orry of VideoGamer.com called the controls "slick". Eurogamer's Tom Bramwell praised the game's simplicity. The New York Times's Charles Herold enjoyed the simple control scheme but wrote he would rather play real table tennis. GamesRadar+'s Amrich felt multiplayer extended replayability. Orry and Bramwell named the online multiplayer "excellent"; the former noted minor lag but wrote the "performance was generally very good".

When the game was ported to the Wii, the additional Wii Remote controls received positive reactions. IGN's Mark Bozon felt they were an improvement over the original controls, calling it a "huge testament to Rockstar's design". Eurogamer's Ellie Gibson found the altered controls work "perfectly", finding them intuitive and "easy to grasp". GameSpot's Davis wrote that the controls "work pretty well", though he felt they fail to complement the gameplay. Conversely, Orry of VideoGamer.com felt the original controls "have more depth" than those on the Wii.

== Bibliography ==
- Rockstar San Diego, ed. (2006), "Rockstar Games Presents Table Tennis Game Manual" (PDF), Rockstar Games, archived (PDF) from the original on March 3, 2016
