= Spun (disambiguation) =

Spun is a 2002 film directed by Jonas Åkerlund.

Spun may also refer to:

- Spun (album), a 1998 album by Keller Williams
  - "Spun", a song by Keller Williams on the album of the same name
- "Spun", a song by The Brian Jonestown Massacre on their 1998 album Strung Out in Heaven
- "Spun", a song by Methods of Mayhem on their 1999 album Methods of Mayhem
- "Spun", a song by VETO on their 2011 album Everything Is Amplified
- "Spun", a 2017 song by Ängie
- "Spun", a song by Chelsea Wolfe on her 2017 album Hiss Spun
- Statement of P25 User Needs, document containing user needs for Project 25 (P25) Land Mobile Radio (LMR) standards

== See also ==
- Spin (disambiguation)
