= Wally Green (table tennis) =

American table tennis player (born 1979)

Wally Green (born 1979) is an American table tennis player. He has played for the U.S. in more than 35 International Pro Tour competitions.

== Early life ==
Green grew up in a low-income housing project in Brooklyn, New York. He became part of a gang and his juvenile rap sheet included carjacking and gun possession. He was shot twice, says that he grew up with domestic violence, and that he owned six guns when he was 13 years old. He was sent to boarding school in Nigeria for a time, and in New York he went to Lafayette High School. At Lafayette, he played basketball, football and volleyball, among other sports.

== Table tennis ==
Green started playing table tennis due to a chance encounter at a pool hall, and discovered that other black people played the game. Playing sports was also a way to avoid his step-father. He found a mentor, who paid for him to train in Hanover, Germany. He played his first International Table Tennis Federation (ITTF) game as global pro in 2001 in Germany. During the following years, he didn't win a lot, but he traveled globally, camera crews noticed him and Rockstar Games became his sponsor. According to The New York Times, he "brought charisma and showmanship" to the sport. He won his first international match in the 2009 Korea Open.

In 2015, he decided to participate as the only Westerner in the Pyongyang Open in North Korea. He said later that "I wanted the North Koreans to realize that Americans aren't their enemies" and, about playing in front of 5,000 North Koreans, that "You can feel the eyes of everyone looking at you because you're very different ... It's the most eerie, like really strange, feeling."

Green stopped competing internationally in 2016. His record in ITTF events is one match won in singles, and two in doubles. In 2018 he said "I'm not the best player in the world, but I'm definitely the coolest. I'm sure of it. That beats being the best." He credits table tennis with saving his life.

== Other activities ==
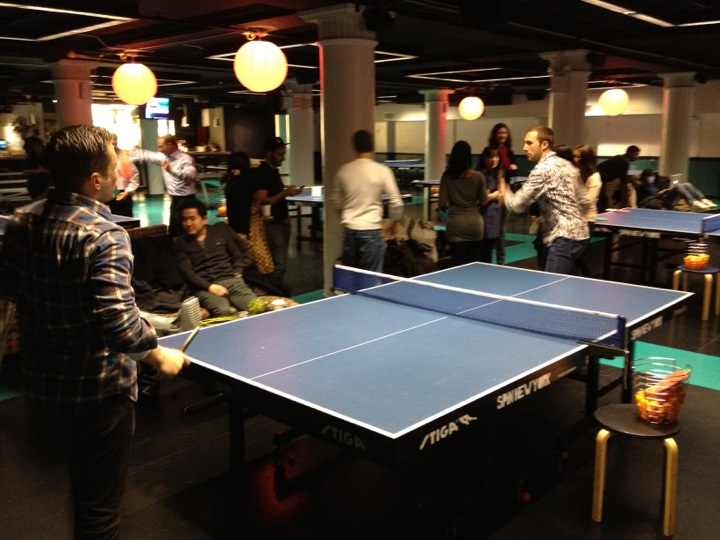
SPiN, New York, in 2011

Green was involved in the promotion of the 2006 video game Rockstar Games Presents Table Tennis in Tokyo, and provided motion capture for one of the characters. In 2009, he co-founded the table tennis franchise SPiN with, among others, Susan Sarandon. On his initiative, table tennis tables were installed in Bryant Park in New York City, initially as marketing for SPiN.

In 2013, he released a hip-hop song called "A Game Nobody Knows (Ping Pong Song)". In 2022, he was featured in Unanimous Media's The Greatest Sports Stories Never Told.

== Personal life ==
Green suffered from pain for several years, and underwent hip resurfacing in 2018.

== See also ==
- Ping-pong diplomacy
