= Soo Yeon Lee =

South Korean model and table tennis player

- 이수연
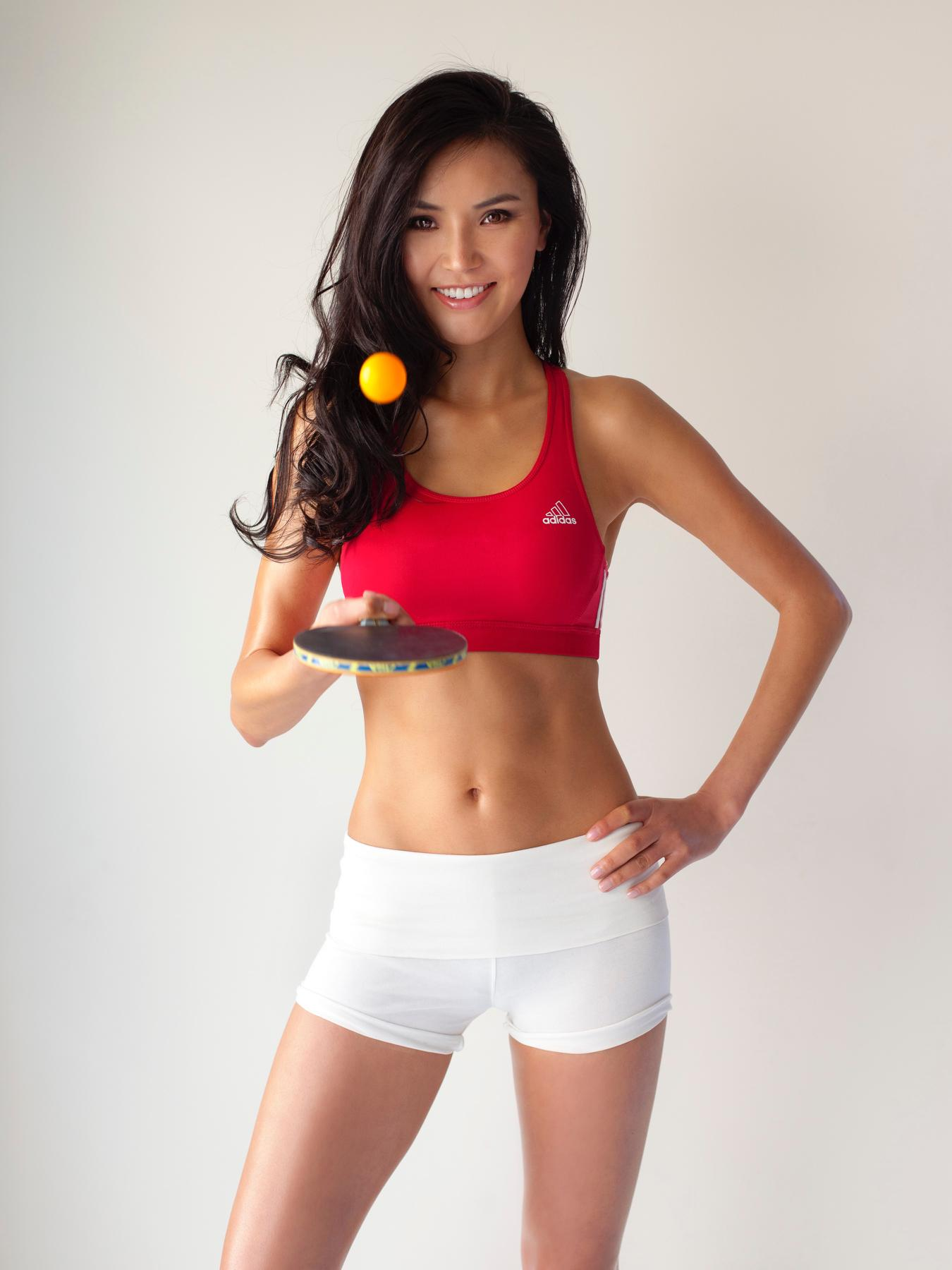
- Lee in 2012
- Born: May 22, 1984 (age 42); Busan, South Korea
- Occupations: Table tennis player; model; actress; coach
- Modeling information
- Height: 175 cm (5 ft 9 in)
- Hair color: Black
- Eye color: Brown

Korean name
- Hangul: 이수연
- RR: I Suyeon
- MR: I Suyŏn
- IPA: [i.su.jʌn]
- Website: sooyeonlee.com

Soo Yeon Lee (Korean: 이수연; born May 22, 1984) is a South Korean model, actress, coach, and former table tennis player.

Lee started playing table tennis at a very early age and was also trained extensively in the sport by an Olympic gold medalist Jung Hwa Hyun in South Korea. Soon thereafter she went on to win the Korean National Junior Championship six times since the age of 12. She has been featured in advertisement campaigns for a number of prominent brands including Nike, Adidas, K-Swiss, Red Bull, and Target. She is the brand ambassador for SPiN, a chain of table tennis restaurants and bars.

== Early life and table tennis career ==
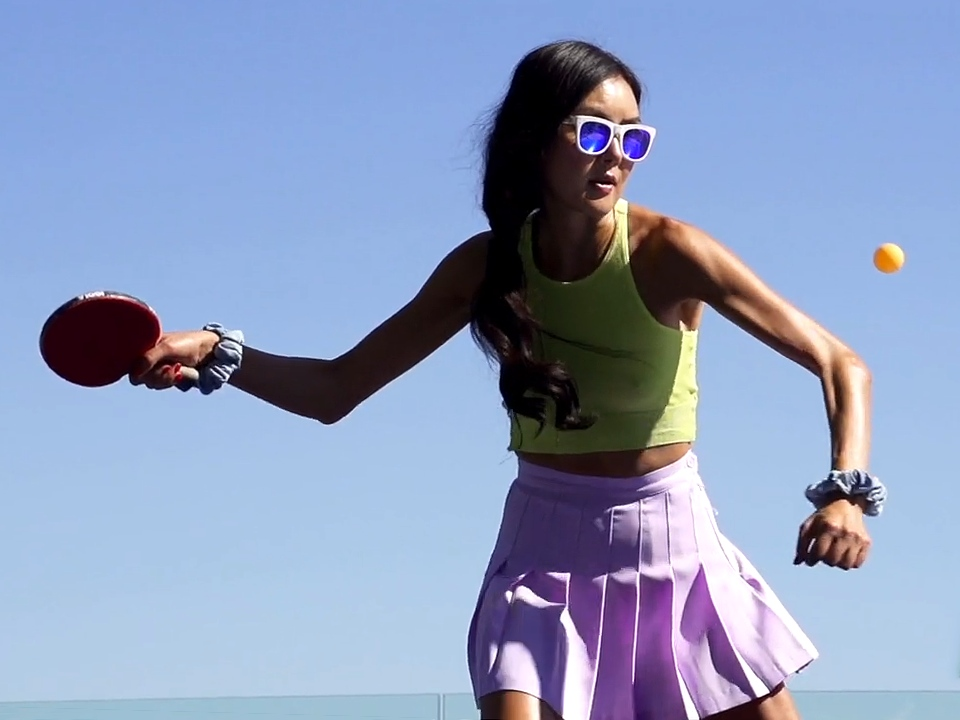
Lee in 2014

Lee was born in Busan, where she began playing table tennis at the age of nine and was competing six months after that. She won her first National Junior Championship at the age of 12. Soon after Lee left home to receive extensive training under the world champion Lee Ailesa, at the Korean National Training Center. She later trained under the supervision of Olympic Gold Medalist Hyun Jung-hwa. Lee won 5 more Korean National Junior championships, followed by three wins in Korean national tournaments.

Lee enrolled in Korea National Sport University where she was coached by Ahn Jae-hyung and joined the national team. In 2001, Lee was a member of the silver medal winning South Korean team at the World University Championships in Beijing. While studying at the university, Lee earned degrees in sports psychology and physical education.

In 2004, Lee decided to move to New Zealand to learn English. Lee won the New Zealand Women’s Singles Championship and she was named New Zealand Female Sportsperson of the Year. After 5 months in New Zealand, Lee returned to South Korea.

Lee moved to the United States in 2007 while her sister was studying in Chicago, Illinois. Lee moved to Los Angeles, California where she enrolled in UCLA. She won several tournaments in the United States, including the US Open in 2007, and Killerspin Invitational in 2009.

== Modeling and acting ==
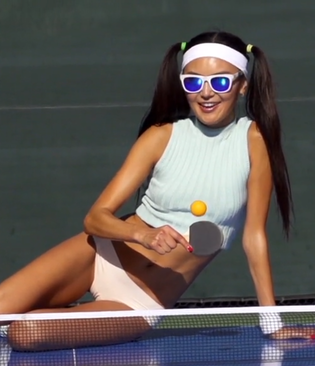
Lee posing for a modeling shoot

Lee was discovered by modeling agents in Los Angeles soon after she moved to L.A. in 2007, but she started working as model professionally in 2009. It was not until 2009, however, that her modeling career began to integrate her table tennis skills. In 2009, Lee attended the opening of Susan Sarandon's first table tennis club SPiN in New York City. She later appeared with Sarandon on The Jay Leno Show and has since been a brand ambassador for the company as it has expanded to other locations. Lee has worked for a number of other clients including Nike, Adidas, K-Swiss, Red Bull, Playboy, and Target.

In addition to Lee's modeling work, she has also acted, including in an episode of Entourage, Keeping Up with the Kardashians, Cross Wars, and other films.

== Coaching ==
Lee is a USA Table Tennis certified coach. In addition to competitive players, she has coached a number of celebrities including Oliver Stone, Jamie Foxx, Susan Sarandon, Reggie Miller, as well as John Stamos, and Kevin Dillon for the Entourage TV series.
