= SPIN (software process) =

A Software Process Improvement Network (SPIN) is an organization of professionals who are interested in software and systems process improvement. As of a few years ago, there were 116 SPINs in 37 countries worldwide in their individual geographical areas.

Each SPIN is a completely independent organization. The Software Engineering Institute (SEI) previously provided support to the SPINs by creating, maintaining, and distributing the SPIN Directory; connecting those software professionals with emerging or existing SPINs; and distributing the SPINs start-up information.

== See also ==
- Software Engineering Institute
- ISO 15504
