= SPiN =

Chain of franchised table tennis bars

SPIN Global
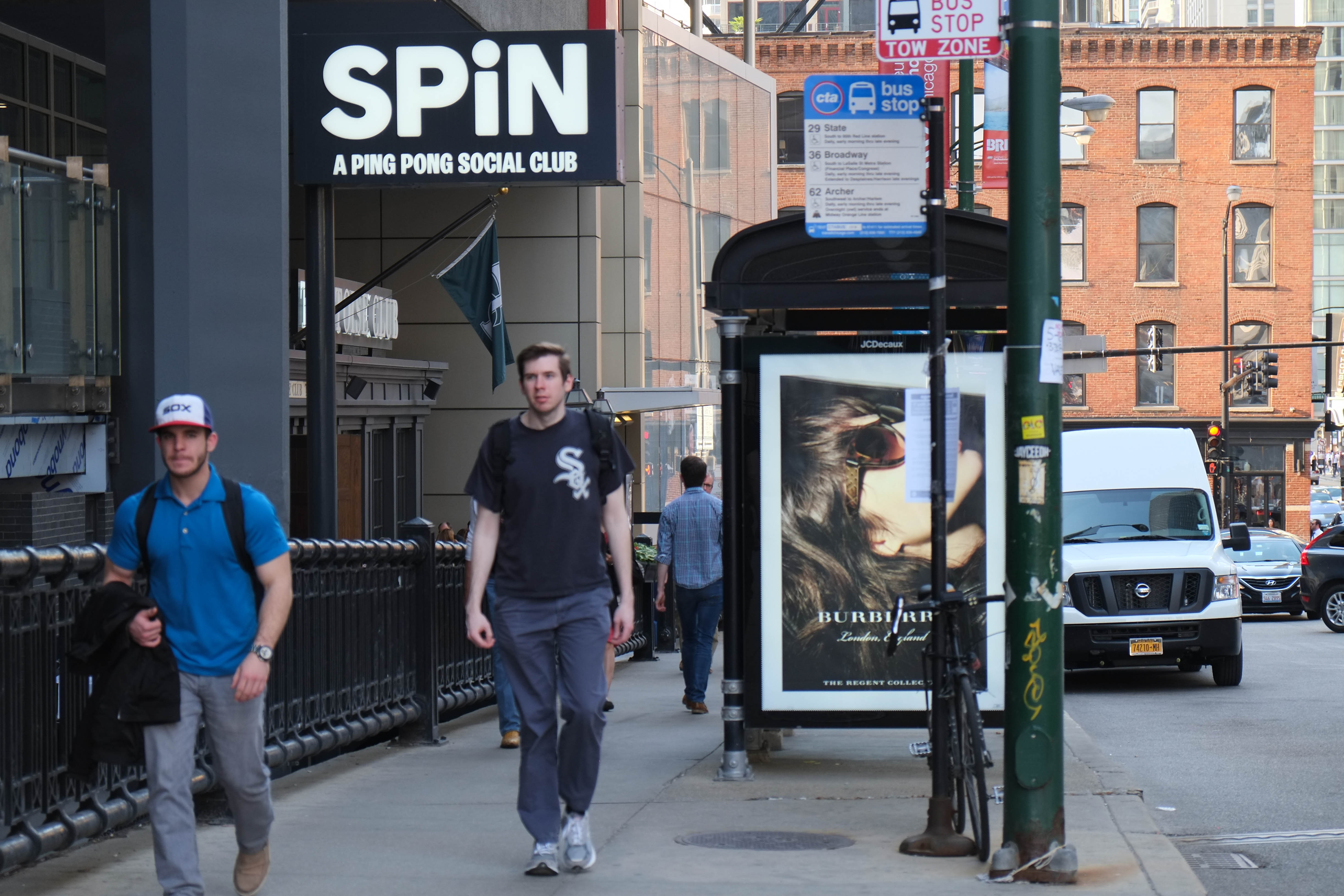
- Sign outside of SPIN Chicago in 2016
- Type: Theme restaurant
- Founded: September 17, 2009; 17 years ago in New York City, New York, United States
- Founders: Franck Raharinosy, Jonathan Bricklin, Andre Gordon, Wally Green
- Headquarters: New York City, United States
- Key people: Pieter Vanermen (CEO), Atanda Musa (ping pong pro), Soo Yeon Lee (brand ambassador)
- Services: Table tennis clubs
- Website: http://wearespin.com/

SPiN is an international chain of franchised table tennis clubs and bars. The company was founded in 2009 by Jonathan Bricklin, Andrew Gordon, Franck Raharinosy, and Wally Green.

== History and locations ==
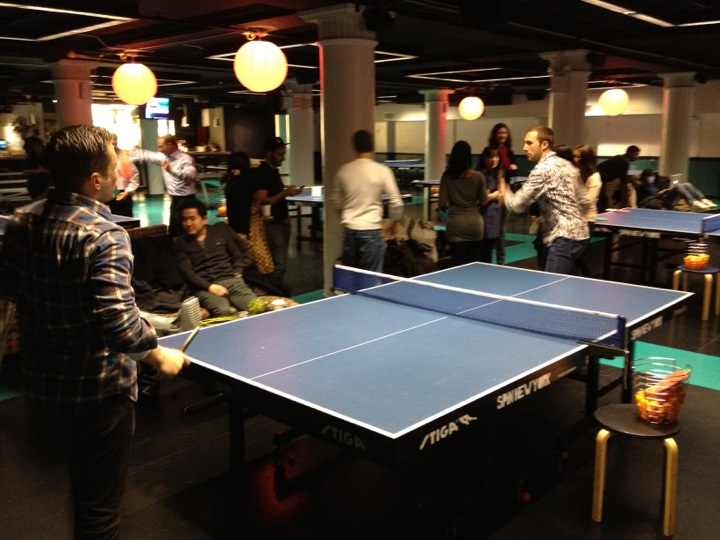
SPiN New York in 2011

The first location of SPIN opened in New York City's Flatiron District on Park Avenue.

The first SPIN franchise outside of New York opened in 2010 in Milwaukee (the table tennis bar at this location is now no longer affiliated with the SPiN brand). In 2011, a location opened in Toronto and in 2013 a location (containing a gold-plated ping pong table) opened in Dubai (it later closed due to Dubai's more conservative drinking norms). Further locations have opened (or are planned to open) in Austin, Chicago, Los Angeles, Philadelphia, and San Francisco. As of 2017, there are seven current or planned SPiN locations in the U.S. and Canada.

Austin which is now closed made way for them to open a location in Boston's Seaport.

== Concept and marketing ==
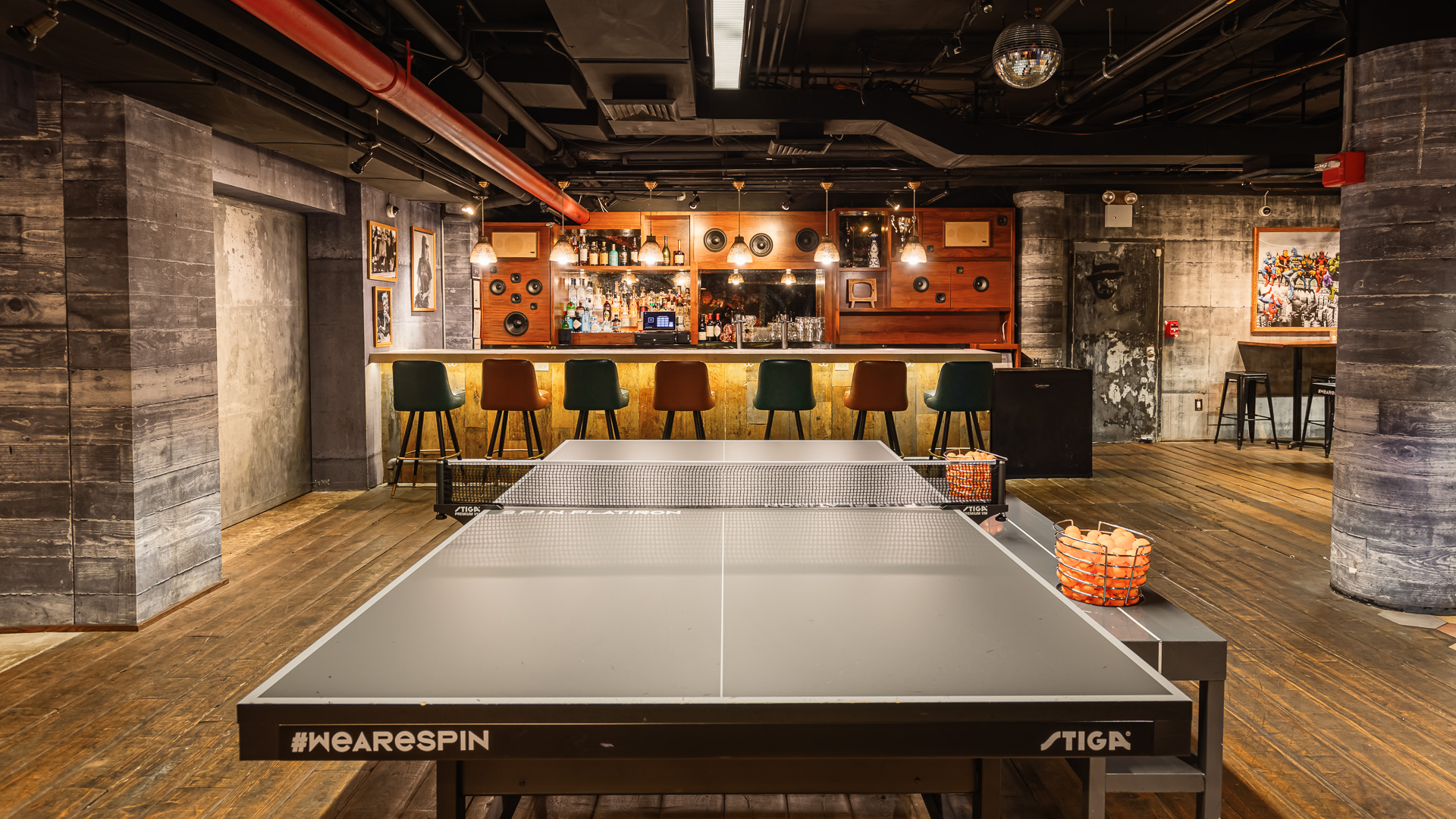
SPIN New York Flatiron's private room in 2024

The concept of SPIN was inspired by popular table tennis parties (called "Naked Ping Pong") held regularly by SPIN co-founders Bricklin, Raharinosy, and Green along with Kazuyuki Yokoyama. SPiN franchises incorporate full-service bars and restaurants along with their ping pong tables. The ping pong tables can be reserved by customers (including a "center court" table at many locations) who then play for an hourly cost (or purchase a membership). Location openings have often included celebrity appearances and professional table tennis players. The chain has partnered with the Glide Foundation to help provide access to table tennis to youth who might be otherwise unable to play.
