= Flat spin =

Flat spin may refer to:

- Flat spin (aviation), spinning motion by a fixed-wing aircraft with angle of attack of 65 degrees or more
- Flat spin (roller coaster element), a term used to describe a tight corkscrew element of a roller coaster
- Flat spin, a skateboarding slide maneuver
- Flat spin, a freeskiing jump trick
- Flat Spin, a Thoroughbred that won the 2002 Easter Stakes

== See also ==
- FlatSpin, a 2001 play written by Alan Ayckbourn
