= SPiN (band) =

Rock pop trio

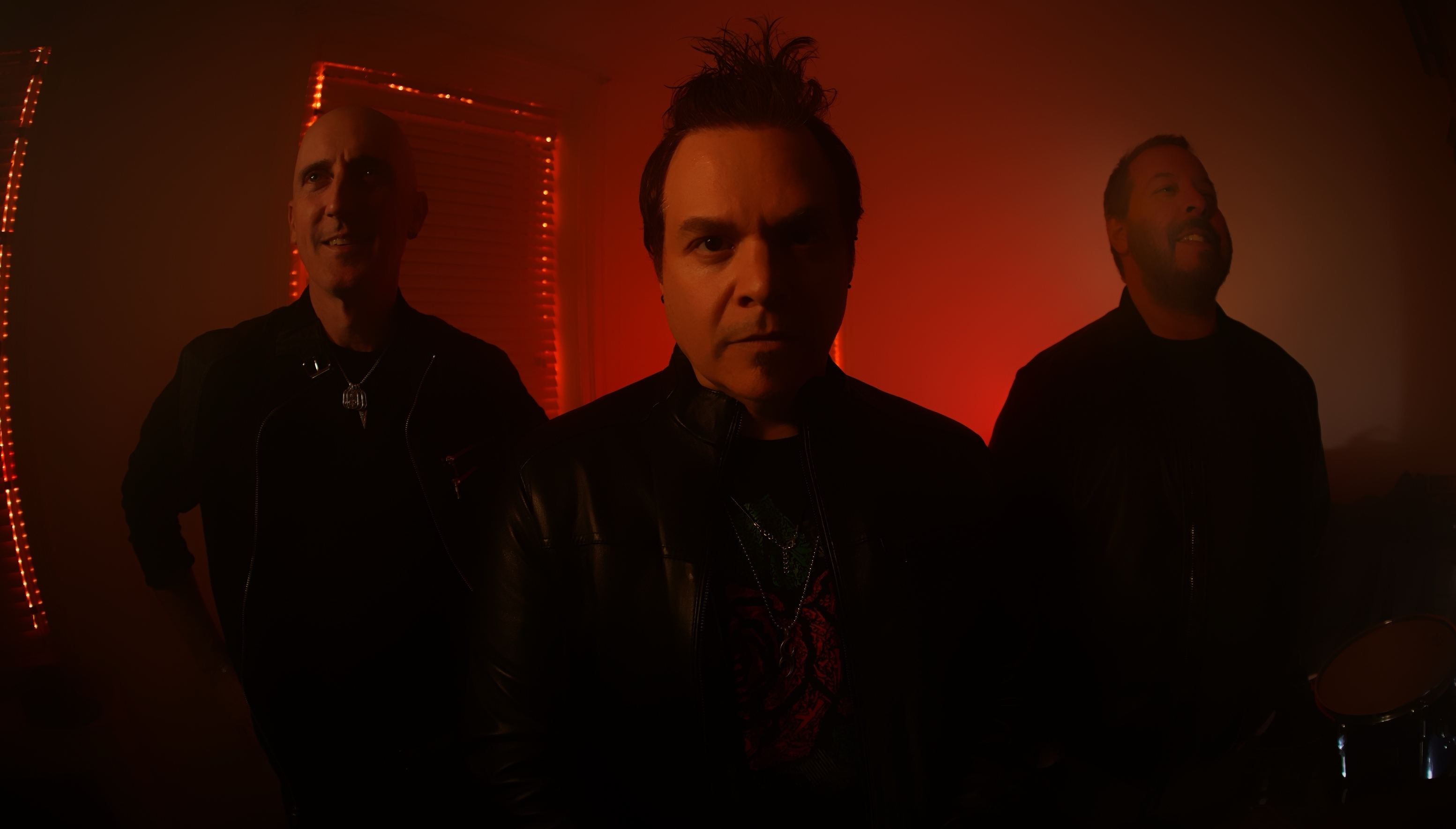

Background information
- Origin: Philadelphia, Pennsylvania, United States
- Genres: Pop rock, power pop, alternative rock
- Years active: 2010—present
- Label: howsaboutNOW? Records
- Members: Jim Vacca; Lou Chudnofsky; Henry Cieplinski
- Past members: Eric Rothenheber
- Website: SPiNrocks.com

SPiN is an American power pop and alternative rock band from Philadelphia, Pennsylvania. Formed in 2010 by founding members Eric Rothenheber (lead vocals, guitar), Jim Vacca (keyboards, backing vocals), Henry Cieplinski (guitar), and Lou Chudnofsky (drums).

The band has toured extensively across the United States, performing over 1,000 shows in 32 states as support for acts including Puddle of Mudd, Halestorm, and Fuel. In 2015, "Happy Together", the first single from their Stalked EP hit #1 on the iTunes Indie Rock charts and remained in the top 5 for over two months.

Their music has been featured in numerous American television programs, and in 2018, their Halloween-themed single "Zombie Girl" became a viral success on YouTube, accumulating over 72 million views.

== Formation ==
SPiN's origins can be traced back to La Salle College High School in Wyndmoor, Pennsylvania, where vocalist Eric Rothenheber and keyboardist Jim Vacca first began performing together. Guitarist Henry Cieplinski and drummer Lou Chudnofsky were added, and with the help of a local booking agent band began playing regional shows 3–5 times a week. Their performances, along with a demo cut in a friend's basement studio, helped secure national sponsorship by the herb-infused liqueur brand Jägermeister, and the band was invited to be part of the Jäger Music Tour series. SPiN's debut EP, Home was then produced by Grammy-winning producer David Ivory with strings arranged and conducted by Louis Anthony deLise.

== Music placements on network TV ==
- "Happy Together" was featured in the conclusion of episode 13 of the CBS hit show Stalker on January 21, 2015.
- "Silent Night" was featured in the commercial spots for the movie Scott Pilgrim vs. the World airing on IFC (U.S. TV network) TV Network during all of November and December 2014.
- "Hurt By You" was featured in the Free Beats segment on Attack of the Show.
- "Not in Love" was used in the MTV Network top-rated series Teen Mom on the 2010 finale episode of season 1. It is also featured in the popular online video game Audition Online.
- "hurt by you" was used in the MTV Network series I Used To Be Fat on Episode 5 of Season 1 in 2011.
- "doN't look dowN" was featured on the internationally syndicated radio show ExploreMusic with Alan Cross on February 2, 2011 who said about the band, "True DIY power pop that should turn some heads. If not, you're not listening properly."
- "home" was featured in Emmelunga market stores and Aiazzone Furniture Stores, and at WaterPark Ondablu (all in Italy).
- "Not In Love" was featured on Brain Games (2011 TV series) on the National Geographic channel.
- "Sing Myself" was featured on TripTank on the [Comedy Central] channel.
- "My Everything" was featured in the Why I'm Not on Facebook documentary.
- "The First Noel" was featured on The Detour on TBS.
- "Breathe" was featured on Bid & Destroy (TV series) on Nat Geo.
- "Want to Tell You" was featured on American Restoration on History.

== Press ==
SPiN's releases have been met with favorable press in newspapers, magazines and websites in the United States, including the Philadelphia Daily News and The Philadelphia Inquirer. Feature articles were written on the band in The Virginia Tribune, Baltimore Times, Florida Style magazine, and the Washington Informer.

== Discography ==
=== Albums / EPs / Singles ===
- Home EP 2010
- BELiEVE Album 2010
- Christmas Time Again EP 2011
- The Scream Inside EP 2012
- Hard to Ignore EP 2013
- Pushed Around EP 2013
- "Happy Together" Single 2013
- Stalked EP 2015
- What A Rush EP 2015
- Jar of Lies EP 2015
- "Just Fight (Ally's Song)" Single 2016
- My Hysteria EP 2016
- "What's Going On" (featuring Nikey Knoxx) Single 2016
- Meant to Rise EP 2017
- All I Want for Christmas is my Two Front Teeth Single 2018
- Make Me Move Album 2019
- Carol of the Merry Gentlemen Single 2019
- Thought I Knew You Single 2020
- Dreaming Single 2022

=== RadioPlay/Charting ===
Year	Title	Peak Chart Position	Album
2010	"Album"	CMJ #5	BELiEVE
2011	"Don't Look Down"		BELiEVE
2013	"Christmas Time Again (I'll Be Good Next Year)"		Christmas Time Again EP
2015	"Happy Together"	iTunes Indie Rock Charts #1	Stalked EP
2017	"Happy Together"	iTunes Top Alternative Tracks Turkey #14	Stalked EP
2020	"Drive"	iTunes Top Alternative Tracks Switzerland #114	Home

== Band members ==
=== Current members ===
- Jim Vacca: Bass Synth, keyboards, backing vocals (2010–present)
- Henry Cieplinski: Guitar, backing vocals (2010–present)
- Lou Chudnofsky: Drums (2010–present)

=== Former members ===
- Eric Rothenheber: Lead vocals, guitar (2010–2020)
