= Twirling =

Form of object manipulation

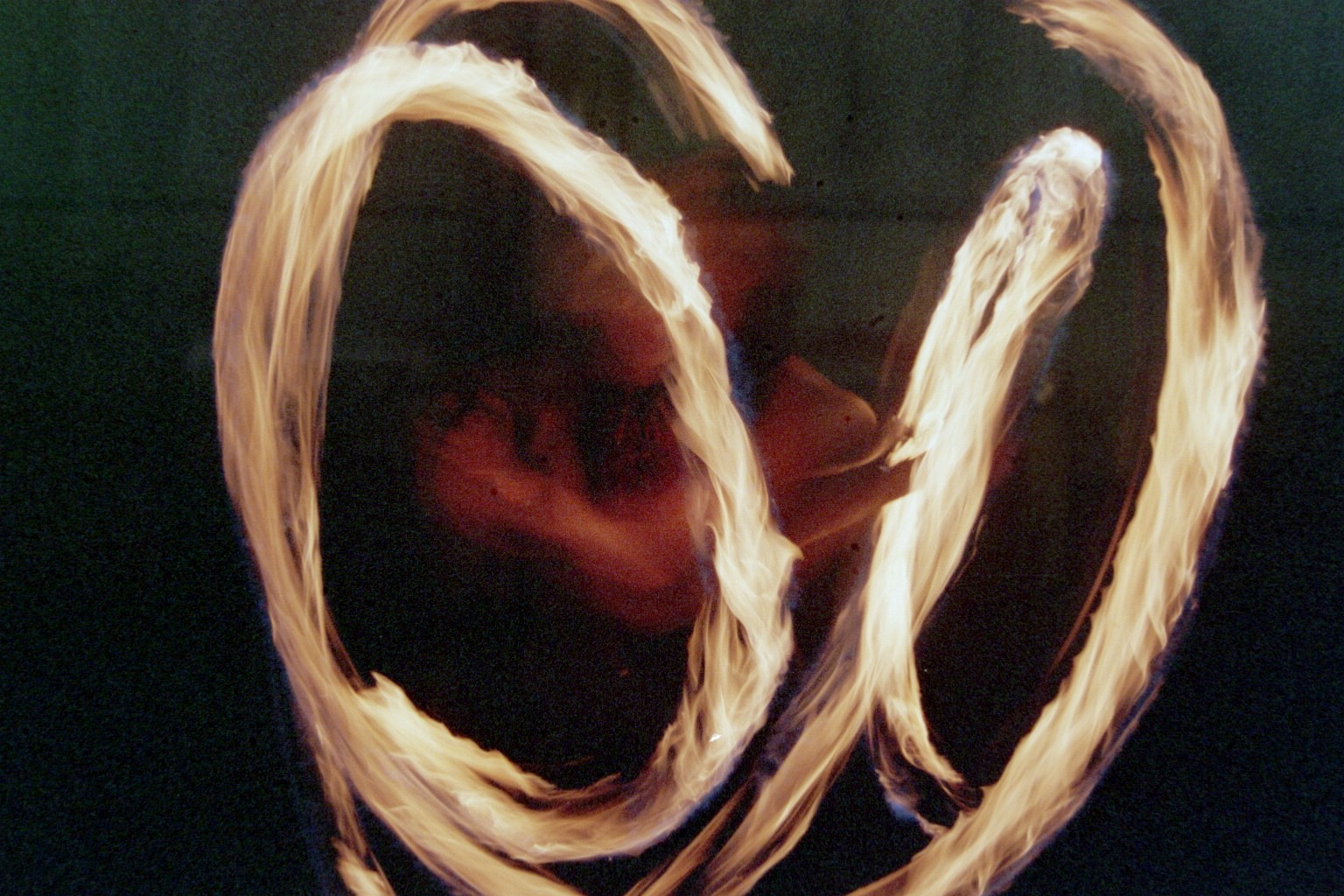
A hobby — performance — sport — traditional Māori dance, flaming poi are among a wide variety of twirling gear in modern use.

Twirling is a form of object manipulation where an object is twirled by one or two hands, the fingers or by other parts of the body. Twirling practice manipulates the object in circular or near circular patterns. It can also be done indirectly by the use of another object or objects as in the case of devil stick manipulation where handsticks are used. Twirling is performed as a hobby, sport, exercise or performance.

== Types ==
Twirling includes a wide variety of practices that use different equipment or props. All props are 'stick' or simulated stick shape and are rotated during the activity. The types of twirling are arranged alphabetically.

== Baton twirling ==
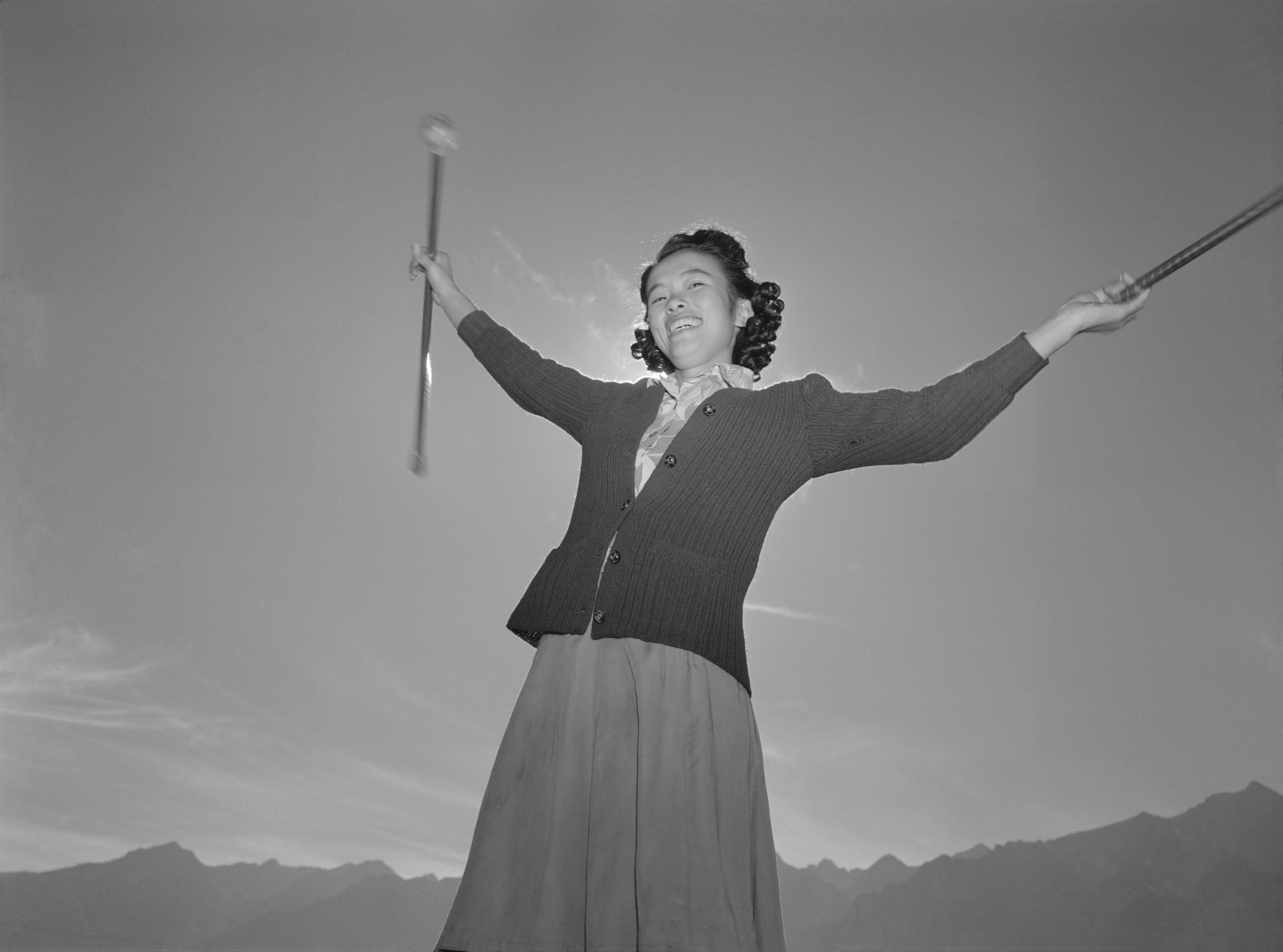
Baton twirling, Manzanar War Relocation Center, 1943. Photographed by Ansel Adams.

Baton twirling has expanded beyond parades and is now more comparable to rhythmic gymnastics (see below). The sport is popular in many countries including the United States, Japan, Spain, France, Italy, the Netherlands and Canada. Many countries compete each year at the World Baton Twirling Championships.

Routines for competitive sport baton twirling are designed for athletes of novice through elite stages of development, experience and ability. Individual competitive events utilize one-baton, two-baton, or three-baton to standardized music while group competitive events are performed with members twirling together with precision and unison. Also there are pair and group events which include Freestyle Pairs and Freestyle Team at the highest level. Groups utilize their own pre-recorded music.

== Pen spinning ==
A combination of pen spinning tricks.

Pen spinning — using one's fingers to manipulate an ordinary inexpensive writing-pen — can be performed anywhere. Sometimes classified as a form of contact juggling, pen spinning may also include tossing and catching of the pen.

Called "rōnin mawashi" in Japan, where it is popular among the pre-collegiate community, pen twirling has its stars, as does any other performance or skill. Accomplished masters of the art form that are well known — at least among those who follow the sport — have developed a reputation for creation of certain signature 'moves'. David Weis is credited with creating numerous 'back' style moves, such as the "BackAround". Hideaki Kondoh is generally credited with giving the pen trick "Sonic" its name, because of the way the pen would blur in his fingers.

Penspinning only recently saw a rapid increase in recognition due to the emergence of internet media websites such as YouTube. From 2006 onwards, the art of Penspinning has developed subcultures in many countries of the world including the Asiatic-regions and Europe (France, Germany and Poland).

== Poi ==
Poi is a form of juggling, dance or performance art, accomplished using balls, or various other weights, on ropes or chains — held in each hand, and swung in various circular patterns, similar to club-twirling. It was originally practiced by the Māori people of New Zealand (the word poi means "ball").

== Rhythmic gymnastics ==
Combining elements of ballet, gymnastics, theatrical dance, and apparatus manipulation, Rhythmic Gymnastics, once largely considered a sport for women and girls, is growing in popularity among men as well. The Japanese's version of Men's rhythmic gymnastics includes tumbling and is performed on a spring floor. Men compete in four types of apparatus: rope, stick, double rings and clubs. Groups do not use any apparatus. Japan hosted the first men's world championships in 2003.

Rhythmic gymnastics as a sport began in the 1940s in the former Soviet Union. It was there that for the first time, the spirit of sports was combined with the sensuous art of classical ballet. (To Isadora Duncan, we credit the famous rebellion against the dogma of classical ballet and the shift toward the creation of a new discipline that would blend art and sport.) Recognized in 1961 as 'modern gymnastics', later 'rhythmic sportive gymnastics', rhythmic gymnastics experienced its first World Championships for individual gymnasts in 1963 in Budapest.

Today, Rhythmic gymnastics as a sport continues on, and hobbyists have adopted rhythmic gymnastics props such as the women's Ball, Clubs, Hoop, Ribbon, and Rope, plus the stick and rings of men's gymnastics, as exercise and recreational gear. These props have found their way into the modern 'juggling and dexterity play community' where they are used to perform tricks and maneuvers for fun fitness, and flexibility.

== Sticks and staves ==
=== Devil sticks ===
"Twirling", "sticking," and "stick juggling" are all common terms for using the twirling prop known as devil sticks, flower sticks, or various other names. A set of devil sticks is made up of one baton and two control sticks.

In use the central stick, the baton, is pushed, lifted and caressed by the two control sticks causing the stick to flip, wobble, spin, and fly through various maneuvers or tricks.

Juggling sticks similar to the modern variants have continuously evolved as they were passed down through the centuries. Apparently originating in Africa earlier than 3000 BCE, "devil sticks" may have followed the Silk Road, from Cairo to China, and have been used in Europe since the Renaissance.

=== Morris dancing ===
In some forms of Morris dancing, a stick is twirled in one hand during a dance. For example, in stick dances from Brackley in the Cotswold tradition, each dancer twirls one or two sticks throughout the dance.

=== Staff twirling ===
Staff twirling is the art or sport of skillfully manipulating a staff, such as a quarterstaff, bo, or other long length of wood, metal, or plastic as recreation, sport, or as a performance.

In the martial art of bojutsu, a bo is used as a weapon, increasing the force delivered in a strike, through leverage. Bojitsu kata—detailed patterns of movements practiced to perfect one's form—are also used in many traditional Japanese arts, such as kabuki. Some of these kata, are very flowing and pleasant to experience, both as the one executing the movement, and as a spectator.

Staff twirling has enjoyed recent growth in the dexterity play, juggling and fire dancing communities, in part due to the influence of martial arts, and in part due to increasing popularity of adult play as recreation.

== Mathematical significance ==
The figure-eight twirl can be used as a demonstration that a double rotation is a loop in rotation space that can be shrunk to a point.

== See also ==
- Hooping
- Plate trick
- Sufi whirling
