= 1937–38 NCAA men's basketball season =

Men's collegiate basketball season

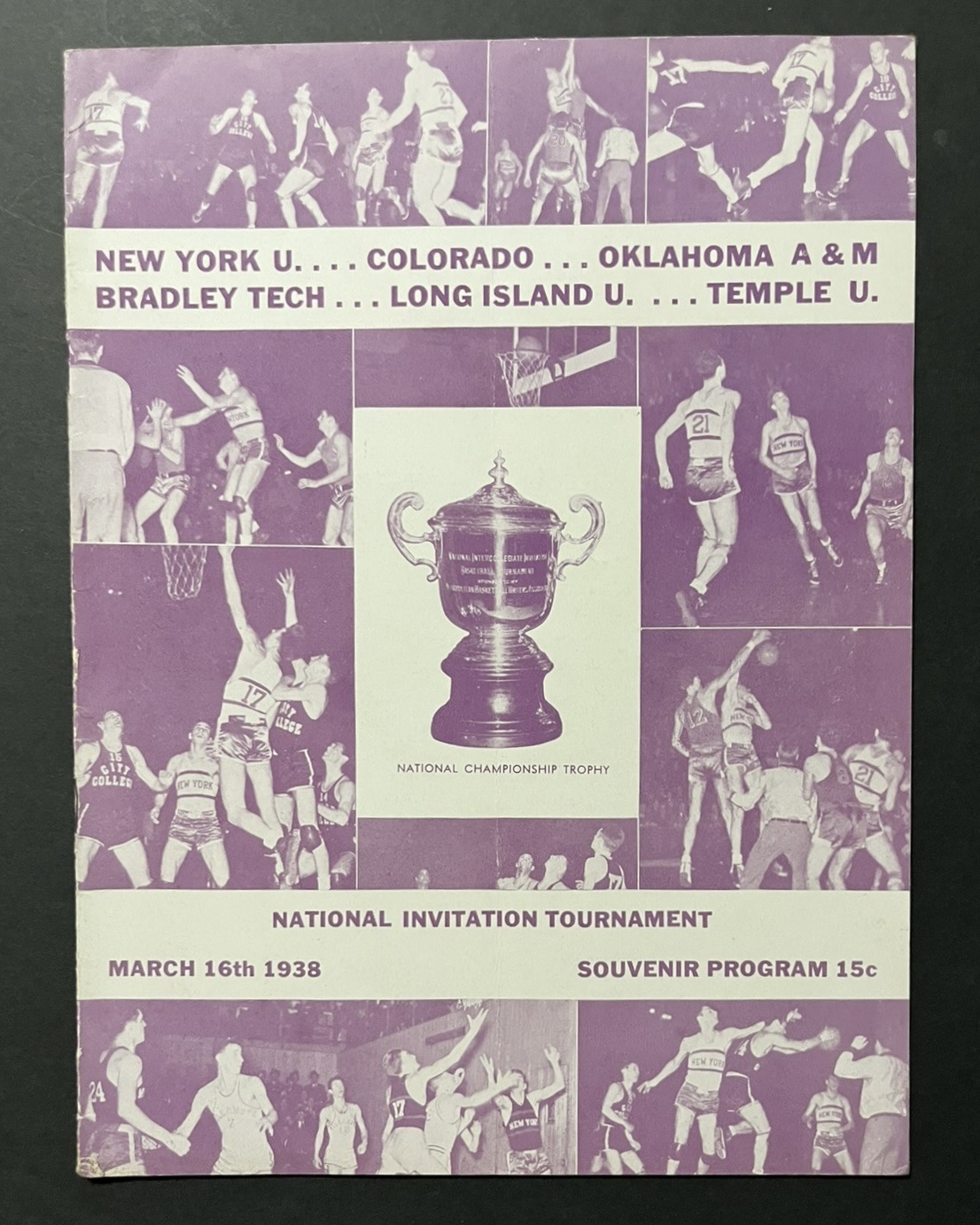
- Souvenir program from the inaugural NIT showcasing the "National Championship Trophy" won by Temple.
- Helms National Champions: Temple (retroactive selection in 1943)
- Other champions: Temple (NIT)
- Player of the Year (Helms): Hank Luisetti, Stanford (retroactive selection in 1944)

The 1937–38 NCAA men's basketball season began in December 1937, progressed through the regular season and conference tournaments, and concluded in March 1938.

== Rule changes ==
After a field goal, the opposing team receives possession of the ball. Previously, a jump ball at center court had taken place after every field goal.

== Season headlines ==
- The New England Conference played its first season at the major-program level.
- The Northern California Conference began play.
- Hank Luisetti of Stanford became the first player to score 50 or more points in one game when he scored 50 in a win over Duquesne on January 1, 1938.
- The Metropolitan Basketball Writers Association founded the National Invitation Tournament (NIT), which was played for the first time in 1938. A field of six teams participated, with the Temple Owls winning the first NIT championship. Although the NCAA tournament began play the following season, the NIT, playing its games at Madison Square Garden and easily accessible to the New York City media, was considered the more glamorous and prestigious of the two tournaments until at least the mid-1950s
- In February 1943, the Helms Athletic Foundation retroactively selected Temple as its national champion for the 1937–38 season.
- In 1995, the Premo-Porretta Power Poll retroactively selected Temple as its top-ranked team for the 1937–38 season.

== Conference membership changes ==
| School | Former conference | New conference |
|---|---|---|
| Colorado College Tigers | Rocky Mountain Athletic Conference | Non-major basketball program |
| Northeastern Huskies | Non-major basketball program | New England Conference |
| Pacific Tigers | Non-major basketball program | Northern California Conference |
| Saint Louis Billikens | Independent | Missouri Valley Conference |
| Saint Mary's (Calif.) Gaels | Independent | Northern California Conference |
| San Francisco Dons | Independent | Northern California Conference |
| San Jose State Spartans | Non-major basketball program | Northern California Conference |
| Santa Clara Broncos | Independent | Northern California Conference |
| Virginia Cavaliers | Southern Conference | Independent |

== Regular season ==
=== Conferences ===
==== Conference winners and tournaments ====
| Conference | Regular season winner | Conference player of the year | Conference tournament | Tournament venue (City) | Tournament winner |
|---|---|---|---|---|---|
| Big Six Conference | Kansas | None selected | No Tournament | | |
| Big Ten Conference | Purdue | None selected | No Tournament | | |
| Border Conference | New Mexico State | None selected | No Tournament | | |
| Eastern Intercollegiate Basketball League | Dartmouth | None selected | No Tournament | | |
| Eastern Intercollegiate Conference | Temple | None selected | No Tournament | | |
| Metropolitan New York Conference | NYU | None selected | No Tournament | | |
| Missouri Valley Conference | Oklahoma A&M | None selected | No Tournament | | |
| New England Conference | Rhode Island State | | No Tournament | | |
| Northern California Conference | San Jose State & Santa Clara | | No Tournament | | |
| Pacific Coast Conference | Oregon (North); Stanford (South) | | No Tournament; Stanford defeated Oregon in best-of-three conference championship playoff series | | |
| Rocky Mountain Athletic Conference | Colorado & Utah | | No Tournament | | |
| Southeastern Conference | Georgia Tech | None selected | 1938 SEC men's basketball tournament | Huey Long Field House (Baton Rouge, Louisiana) | Georgia Tech |
| Southern Conference | North Carolina | None selected | 1938 Southern Conference men's basketball tournament | Thompson Gym (Raleigh, North Carolina) | Duke |
| Southwest Conference | Arkansas | None selected | No Tournament | | |

==== Conference standings ====
1937–38 Big Six Conference men's basketball standings
| | Conf. | | | | Overall |
| Team | W | | L | PCT | W | | L | PCT |
|---|---|---|---|---|---|---|---|---|
| Kansas | 9 | – | 1 | .900 | 18 | – | 2 | .900 |
| Oklahoma | 8 | – | 2 | .800 | 14 | – | 4 | .778 |
| Missouri | 4 | – | 6 | .400 | 9 | – | 9 | .500 |
| Nebraska | 4 | – | 6 | .400 | 9 | – | 11 | .450 |
| Kansas State | 3 | – | 7 | .300 | 7 | – | 11 | .389 |
| Iowa State | 2 | – | 8 | .200 | 6 | – | 9 | .400 |

1937–38 Big Ten Conference men's basketball standings
| | Conf. | | | | Overall |
| Team | W | | L | PCT | W | | L | PCT |
|---|---|---|---|---|---|---|---|---|
| Purdue | 10 | – | 2 | .833 | 18 | – | 2 | .900 |
| Minnesota | 9 | – | 3 | .750 | 16 | – | 4 | .800 |
| Ohio State | 7 | – | 5 | .583 | 12 | – | 8 | .600 |
| Northwestern | 7 | – | 5 | .583 | 10 | – | 10 | .500 |
| Michigan | 6 | – | 6 | .500 | 12 | – | 8 | .600 |
| Iowa | 6 | – | 6 | .500 | 11 | – | 9 | .550 |
| Wisconsin | 5 | – | 7 | .417 | 10 | – | 10 | .500 |
| Illinois | 4 | – | 8 | .333 | 9 | – | 9 | .500 |
| Indiana | 4 | – | 8 | .333 | 10 | – | 10 | .500 |
| Chicago | 2 | – | 10 | .167 | 6 | – | 12 | .333 |

1937–38 Border Conference men's basketball standings
| | Conf. | | | | Overall |
| Team | W | | L | PCT | W | | L | PCT |
|---|---|---|---|---|---|---|---|---|
| New Mexico A&M | 18 | – | 0 | 1.000 | 22 | – | 3 | .880 |
| Arizona | 9 | – | 7 | .563 | 13 | – | 8 | .619 |
| Arizona State–Tempe | 9 | – | 9 | .500 | 11 | – | 12 | .478 |
| Texas Tech | 7 | – | 7 | .500 | 9 | – | 13 | .409 |
| New Mexico | 6 | – | 10 | .375 | 9 | – | 16 | .360 |
| Arizona State–Flagstaff | 4 | – | 12 | .250 | 6 | – | 15 | .286 |
| Texas State M&M | 3 | – | 11 | .214 | 4 | – | 17 | .190 |

1937–38 Eastern Intercollegiate Basketball League standings
| | Conf. | | | | Overall |
| Team | W | | L | PCT | W | | L | PCT |
|---|---|---|---|---|---|---|---|---|
| Dartmouth | 8 | – | 4 | .667 | 20 | – | 5 | .800 |
| Harvard | 7 | – | 5 | .583 | 13 | – | 5 | .722 |
| Penn | 7 | – | 5 | .583 | 8 | – | 10 | .444 |
| Cornell | 6 | – | 6 | .500 | 11 | – | 7 | .611 |
| Columbia | 6 | – | 6 | .500 | 10 | – | 8 | .556 |
| Princeton | 5 | – | 7 | .417 | 10 | – | 10 | .500 |
| Yale | 3 | – | 9 | .250 | 7 | – | 12 | .368 |

1937–38 Eastern Intercollegiate Conference men's basketball standings
| | Conf. | | | | Overall |
| Team | W | | L | PCT | W | | L | PCT |
|---|---|---|---|---|---|---|---|---|
| Temple | 9 | – | 1 | .900 | 23 | – | 2 | .920 |
| Penn State | 6 | – | 4 | .600 | 13 | – | 5 | .722 |
| Pittsburgh | 5 | – | 5 | .500 | 9 | – | 12 | .429 |
| Georgetown | 5 | – | 5 | .500 | 7 | – | 11 | .389 |
| Carnegie Tech | 3 | – | 7 | .300 | 3 | – | 7 | .300 |
| West Virginia | 2 | – | 8 | .200 | 6 | – | 13 | .316 |

1937–38 Metropolitan New York Conference men's basketball standings
| | Conf. | | | | Overall |
| Team | W | | L | PCT | W | | L | PCT |
|---|---|---|---|---|---|---|---|---|
| NYU | 6 | – | 0 | 1.000 | 16 | – | 8 | .667 |
| LIU | 3 | – | 0 | 1.000 | 23 | – | 5 | .821 |
| CCNY | 4 | – | 2 | .667 | 13 | – | 3 | .813 |
| St. John's | 4 | – | 2 | .667 | 15 | – | 4 | .789 |
| Manhattan | 2 | – | 4 | .333 | 12 | – | 6 | .667 |
| Brooklyn | 2 | – | 4 | .333 | 7 | – | 8 | .467 |
| St. Francis (NY) | 1 | – | 5 | .167 | 14 | – | 8 | .636 |
| Fordham | 0 | – | 6 | .000 | 10 | – | 10 | .500 |

1937–38 Missouri Valley Conference men's basketball standings
| | Conf. | | | | Overall |
| Team | W | | L | PCT | W | | L | PCT |
|---|---|---|---|---|---|---|---|---|
| Oklahoma A&M | 13 | – | 1 | .929 | 25 | – | 3 | .893 |
| Drake | 10 | – | 4 | .714 | 14 | – | 6 | .700 |
| Tulsa | 8 | – | 6 | .571 | 12 | – | 10 | .545 |
| Grinnell | 7 | – | 7 | .500 | 10 | – | 9 | .526 |
| Creighton | 7 | – | 7 | .500 | 11 | – | 14 | .440 |
| Washington University | 6 | – | 8 | .429 | 4 | – | 17 | .190 |
| Saint Louis | 3 | – | 11 | .214 | 8 | – | 21 | .276 |
| Washburn | 2 | – | 12 | .143 | 9 | – | 13 | .409 |

1937–38 Mountain States Conference men's basketball standings
| | Conf. | | | | Overall |
| Team | W | | L | PCT | W | | L | PCT |
|---|---|---|---|---|---|---|---|---|
| Utah | 10 | – | 2 | .833 | 20 | – | 4 | .833 |
| Colorado | 10 | – | 2 | .833 | 15 | – | 6 | .714 |
| Wyoming | 8 | – | 4 | .667 | 12 | – | 5 | .706 |
| Utah State | 6 | – | 6 | .500 | 11 | – | 9 | .550 |
| BYU | 4 | – | 8 | .333 | 8 | – | 13 | .381 |
| Colorado State | 3 | – | 9 | .250 | 7 | – | 9 | .438 |
| Denver | 1 | – | 11 | .083 | 2 | – | 16 | .111 |

1937–38 New England Conference men's basketball standings
| | Conf. | | | | Overall |
| Team | W | | L | PCT | W | | L | PCT |
|---|---|---|---|---|---|---|---|---|
| Rhode Island State | 8 | – | 0 | 1.000 | 19 | – | 2 | .905 |
| Connecticut | 4 | – | 4 | .500 | 13 | – | 5 | .722 |
| New Hampshire | 4 | – | 4 | .500 | 12 | – | 6 | .667 |
| Northeastern | 4 | – | 4 | .500 | 6 | – | 12 | .333 |
| Maine | 1 | – | 7 | .125 | 4 | – | 9 | .308 |

1937–38 Northern California Conference men's basketball standings
| | Conf. | | | | Overall |
| Team | W | | L | PCT | W | | L | PCT |
|---|---|---|---|---|---|---|---|---|
| San Jose State | 6 | – | 2 | .750 | 19 | – | 4 | .826 |
| Santa Clara | 6 | – | 2 | .750 | 12 | – | 6 | .667 |
| Saint Mary's | 5 | – | 3 | .625 | 10 | – | 9 | .526 |
| San Francisco | 3 | – | 5 | .375 | 10 | – | 12 | .455 |
| Pacific | 0 | – | 8 | .000 | 6 | – | 13 | .316 |

1937–38 Pacific Coast Conference men's basketball standings
| | Conf. | | | | Overall |
| Team | W | | L | PCT | W | | L | PCT |
|---|---|---|---|---|---|---|---|---|
North
| Oregon | 14 | – | 6 | .700 | 25 | – | 8 | .758 |
| Washington | 13 | – | 7 | .650 | 29 | – | 7 | .806 |
| Washington State | 12 | – | 8 | .600 | 19 | – | 11 | .633 |
| Idaho | 12 | – | 8 | .600 | 24 | – | 11 | .686 |
| Oregon State | 6 | – | 14 | .300 | 17 | – | 16 | .515 |
| Montana | 3 | – | 17 | .150 | 10 | – | 19 | .345 |
South
| Stanford † | 10 | – | 2 | .833 | 21 | – | 3 | .875 |
| California | 8 | – | 4 | .667 | 18 | – | 11 | .621 |
| USC | 6 | – | 6 | .500 | 17 | – | 9 | .654 |
| UCLA | 0 | – | 12 | .000 | 4 | – | 20 | .167 |
† Conference playoff series winner

1937–38 Rocky Mountain Conference men's basketball standings
| | Conf. | | | | Overall |
| Team | W | | L | PCT | W | | L | PCT |
|---|---|---|---|---|---|---|---|---|
| Montana State | 10 | – | 0 | 1.000 | 22 | – | 5 | .815 |
| Colorado State–Greeley | 5 | – | 5 | .500 | 11 | – | 8 | .579 |
| Colorado College | 4 | – | 4 | .500 | 10 | – | 9 | .526 |
| Western State (CO) | 5 | – | 7 | .417 | 7 | – | 11 | .389 |
| Colorado Mines | 0 | – | 8 | .000 | 2 | – | 23 | .080 |

1937–38 Southeastern Conference men's basketball standings
| | Conf. | | | | Overall |
| Team | W | | L | PCT | W | | L | PCT |
|---|---|---|---|---|---|---|---|---|
| Kentucky | 6 | – | 0 | 1.000 | 13 | – | 5 | .722 |
| Ole Miss | 11 | – | 2 | .846 | 22 | – | 12 | .647 |
| Georgia Tech † | 9 | – | 2 | .818 | 18 | – | 2 | .900 |
| Auburn | 6 | – | 3 | .667 | 14 | – | 5 | .737 |
| Tennessee | 7 | – | 4 | .636 | 15 | – | 8 | .652 |
| LSU | 7 | – | 6 | .538 | 10 | – | 10 | .500 |
| Tulane | 5 | – | 6 | .455 | 8 | – | 10 | .444 |
| Mississippi State | 7 | – | 9 | .438 | 9 | – | 12 | .429 |
| Georgia | 4 | – | 6 | .400 | 12 | – | 10 | .545 |
| Vanderbilt | 4 | – | 8 | .333 | 9 | – | 12 | .429 |
| Florida | 3 | – | 7 | .300 | 11 | – | 9 | .550 |
| Alabama | 4 | – | 12 | .250 | 4 | – | 13 | .235 |
| Sewanee | 2 | – | 10 | .167 | 4 | – | 13 | .235 |
† Regular-season championship and SEC Tournament winner

1937–38 Southern Conference men's basketball standings
| | Conf. | | | | Overall |
| Team | W | | L | PCT | W | | L | PCT |
|---|---|---|---|---|---|---|---|---|
| North Carolina | 13 | – | 3 | .813 | 16 | – | 5 | .762 |
| North Carolina State | 10 | – | 3 | .769 | 13 | – | 6 | .684 |
| The Citadel | 7 | – | 3 | .700 | 13 | – | 5 | .722 |
| Clemson | 9 | – | 4 | .692 | 16 | – | 7 | .696 |
| Duke † | 9 | – | 5 | .643 | 15 | – | 9 | .625 |
| Richmond | 7 | – | 4 | .636 | 15 | – | 5 | .750 |
| Maryland | 6 | – | 4 | .600 | 15 | – | 9 | .625 |
| Washington and Lee | 6 | – | 5 | .545 | 12 | – | 9 | .571 |
| Wake Forest | 7 | – | 8 | .467 | 7 | – | 12 | .368 |
| Virginia Tech | 4 | – | 5 | .444 | 6 | – | 8 | .429 |
| Davidson | 4 | – | 11 | .267 | 10 | – | 12 | .455 |
| Furman | 2 | – | 6 | .250 | 6 | – | 13 | .316 |
| VMI | 2 | – | 7 | .222 | 4 | – | 11 | .267 |
| South Carolina | 2 | – | 12 | .143 | 3 | – | 21 | .125 |
| William & Mary | 0 | – | 9 | .000 | 2 | – | 10 | .167 |
† Southern Conference Tournament winner

1937–38 Southwest Conference men's basketball standings
| | Conf. | | | | Overall |
| Team | W | | L | PCT | W | | L | PCT |
|---|---|---|---|---|---|---|---|---|
| Arkansas | 11 | – | 1 | .917 | 19 | – | 3 | .864 |
| Baylor | 9 | – | 3 | .750 | 10 | – | 6 | .625 |
| SMU | 8 | – | 4 | .667 | 9 | – | 6 | .600 |
| Texas A&M | 6 | – | 6 | .500 | 10 | – | 8 | .556 |
| Texas | 5 | – | 7 | .417 | 11 | – | 11 | .500 |
| Rice | 2 | – | 10 | .167 | 6 | – | 17 | .261 |
| TCU | 1 | – | 11 | .083 | 8 | – | 15 | .348 |

=== Major independents ===
A total of 46 college teams played as major independents. St. Bonaventure (9–0) was undefeated, and Western Kentucky State (30–3) finished with the most wins.

1937–38 NCAA men's basketball independents standings
| | Conf. | | | | Overall |
| Team | W | | L | PCT | W | | L | PCT |
|---|---|---|---|---|---|---|---|---|
| St. Bonaventure | | – | | – | 9 | – | 0 | 1.000 |
| Western Kentucky State | | – | | – | 30 | – | 3 | .909 |
| Bradley | | – | | – | 18 | – | 2 | .900 |
| Marshall | | – | | – | 28 | – | 4 | .875 |
| Notre Dame | | – | | – | 20 | – | 3 | .870 |
| Army | | – | | – | 12 | – | 2 | .857 |
| Villanova | | – | | – | 25 | – | 5 | .833 |
| Montana State | | – | | – | 22 | – | 5 | .815 |
| Bowling Green State | | – | | – | 16 | – | 4 | .800 |
| Detroit | | – | | – | 16 | – | 4 | .800 |
| Navy | | – | | – | 11 | – | 3 | .786 |
| George Washington | | – | | – | 13 | – | 4 | .765 |
| Marquette | | – | | – | 14 | – | 5 | .737 |
| Syracuse | | – | | – | 14 | – | 5 | .737 |
| Rutgers | | – | | – | 11 | – | 4 | .733 |
| St. Joseph's | | – | | – | 13 | – | 5 | .722 |
| Toledo | | – | | – | 14 | – | 6 | .700 |
| Miami (Ohio) | | – | | – | 11 | – | 5 | .688 |
| Valparaiso | | – | | – | 13 | – | 6 | .684 |
| Loyola (Ill.) | | – | | – | 12 | – | 8 | .600 |
| Ohio | | – | | – | 11 | – | 8 | .579 |
| Loyola (Md.) | | – | | – | 9 | – | 7 | .563 |
| Seton Hall | | – | | – | 10 | – | 8 | .556 |
| DePaul | | – | | – | 12 | – | 10 | .545 |
| Bucknell | | – | | – | 7 | – | 6 | .538 |
| La Salle | | – | | – | 9 | – | 8 | .529 |
| Lafayette | | – | | – | 9 | – | 8 | .529 |
| Michigan State Normal | | – | | – | 9 | – | 8 | .529 |
| Colgate | | – | | – | 10 | – | 9 | .526 |
| Xavier | | – | | – | 10 | – | 9 | .526 |
| Boston University | | – | | – | 9 | – | 9 | .500 |
| Butler | | – | | – | 11 | – | 12 | .478 |
| Canisius | | – | | – | 8 | – | 9 | .471 |
| Lehigh | | – | | – | 7 | – | 8 | .467 |
| Muhlenberg | | – | | – | 9 | – | 11 | .450 |
| Kent State | | – | | – | 10 | – | 13 | .435 |
| Wichita Municipal | | – | | – | 10 | – | 13 | .435 |
| Brown | | – | | – | 7 | – | 11 | .389 |
| Niagara | | – | | – | 8 | – | 13 | .381 |
| Virginia | | – | | – | 6 | – | 10 | .375 |
| Cincinnati | | – | | – | 6 | – | 11 | .353 |
| Dayton | | – | | – | 6 | – | 11 | .353 |
| Duquesne | | – | | – | 6 | – | 11 | .353 |
| Western State Teachers | | – | | – | 6 | – | 12 | .333 |
| Louisville | | – | | – | 4 | – | 11 | .267 |
| Indiana State | | – | | – | 1 | – | 17 | .056 |

== Post-season tournaments ==
=== National Invitation Tournament ===
==== Semifinals & finals ====
Semifinals
Oklahoma A&M | 55
Temple | 56
Colorado | 48
NYU | 47

Finals
Temple | 60
Colorado | 36
Third place
Oklahoma A&M | 37
NYU | 24

== Awards ==
=== Consensus All-American team ===
Consensus Team
| Player | Class | Team |
|---|---|---|
| Meyer Bloom | Senior | Temple |
| Hank Luisetti | Senior | Stanford |
| John Moir | Senior | Notre Dame |
| Paul Nowak | Senior | Notre Dame |
| Fred Pralle | Senior | Kansas |
| Jewell Young | Senior | Purdue |

=== Major player of the year awards ===
- Helms Player of the Year: Hank Luisetti, Stanford (retroactive selection in 1944)

=== Other major awards ===
- NIT/Haggerty Award (Top player in New York City metro area): Bernie Fliegel, CCNY

== Coaching changes ==
A number of teams changed coaches during the season and after it ended.

| Team | Former Coach | Interim Coach | New Coach | Reason |
|---|---|---|---|---|
| Brown | Art Kahler | | George E. Allen | |
| BYU | Fred Dixon | | Edwin R. Kimball | |
| Cornell | Bo Rowland | | Blair Gullion | |
| Fordham | Vincent Cavanaugh | | Ed Kelleher | |
| Georgia | Rex Enright | | Elmer A. Lampe | |
| Georgetown | Fred Mesmer | | Elmer Ripley | Mesmer stepped aside after seven seasons to allow Ripley to return for a second stint as head coach. |
| Indiana | Everett Dean | | Branch McCracken | Dean left to coach at Stanford. |
| Indiana State | Wally Marks | | Glenn M. Curtis | |
| Lafayette | Mike Michalske | | Richard Madison | |
| Miami (Ohio) | John Mauer | | Weeb Ewbank | Mauer left to coach at Tennessee. |
| Michigan | Franklin Cappon | | Bennie Oosterbaan | Cappon left to coach at Princeton. |
| Ohio | Butch Grover | | Dutch Trautwein | |
| Oklahoma | Hugh McDermott | | Bruce Drake | |
| Ole Miss | George Bohler | | Frank Johnson | |
| Princeton | Ken Fairman | | Franklin Cappon | |
| Rice | Jimmy Kitts | | Buster Brannon | |
| Saint Louis | Ed Davidson | | Jack Sterrett | |
| Saint Mary's | Harlan Dykes | | Jack Otten | |
| SMU | James W. St. Clair | | F. C. Baccus | |
| Stanford | John Bunn | | Everett Dean | |
| Tennessee | Blair Gullion | | John Mauer | Gullion left to coach Cornell. |
| Tulane | Ray G. Dauber | | Claude Simons Jr. | |
| VMI | Albert Elmore | | Jimmy Walker | |
| West Virginia | Marshall Glenn | | Dyke Raese | |
