= 1937–38 Georgetown Hoyas men's basketball team =

American college basketball season

1937–38 Georgetown Hoyas men's basketball
- Conference: Eastern Intercollegiate Conference
- Record: 7–11 (5–5 EIC)
- Head coach: Fred Mesmer (7th season)
- Captain: Mike Petrosky
- Home arena: Tech Gymnasium

1937–38 Eastern Intercollegiate Conference men's basketball standings
	Conf.				Overall
Team	W		L	PCT	W		L	PCT
Temple	9	–	1	.900	23	–	2	.920
Penn State	6	–	4	.600	13	–	5	.722
Pittsburgh	5	–	5	.500	9	–	12	.429
Georgetown	5	–	5	.500	7	–	11	.389
Carnegie Tech	3	–	7	.300	3	–	7	.300
West Virginia	2	–	8	.200	6	–	13	.316

The 1937–38 Georgetown Hoyas men's basketball team represented Georgetown University during the 1937–38 NCAA college basketball season. Fred Mesmer coached it in his seventh and final season as head coach. The team was a member of the Eastern Intercollegiate Conference (EIC) and played its home games at Tech Gymnasium on the campus of McKinley Technical High School in Washington, D.C. The team finished with a record of 7–11 overall, 5–5 in the EIC, and had no postseason play.

== Season recap ==
Senior Harry Bassin was lead forward for the team and averaged 6.8 points per game. In the last game of his collegiate career, the season finale at Yale, he scored a career-high 16 points in Georgetown's overtime loss.

Junior forward Joe Murphy scored 18 points at Madison Square Garden against New York University and led the team in scoring. He finished the season averaging 7.8 points per game.

Senior forward Mike Petrosky was the team's second leading scorer, with only three fewer points for the season than Murphy, and averaged a career-high 7.7 points per game. He was also among the best rebounders, although rebounds were not yet recorded as a game or career statistic.

During conference play, Georgetown finished with a 5–5 record and was the only team to defeat Temple. Temple finished the season at 9–1 in conference play, 23–2 overall, and went on to win the 1938 National Invitation Tournament. Overall, the Hoyas finished with a 7–11 record and had no postseason play.

When Elmer Ripley, who had served as Georgetown's head coach from 1927 to 1929 during Mesmer's time as a Georgetown player, expressed interest in returning to Georgetown for a second tour of duty coaching the Hoyas, Mesmer stepped aside at the end of the season to allow Ripley to take over the program the following year. Mesmer had coached Georgetown for seven seasons with an overall record of 53–76, that record partly reflecting the university's reduced emphasis on sports during his coaching years. Although his teams had gone 36–20 (.643) at home, they had managed only a 17–56 (.233) record on the road, and this had led to only two winning seasons during his tenure. Despite this, he was a popular figure in Georgetown sports throughout his time both as a player and as head coach.

== Roster ==
Senior guard Tom Nolan would go on to serve as Georgetown's head basketball coach from 1956 to 1960, and as the school's baseball coach until the end of the 1978 season.

Sophomore guard Francis "Reds" Daly was killed in action in the Battle of Iwo Jima on February 22, 1945, during World War II military service.

#	Name	Height	Weight (lbs.)	Position	Class	Hometown	Previous Team(s)
3	Joe Murphy	6'0"	N/A	F	Jr.	West New York, NJ, U.S.	Memorial HS
53	Ed Kurtyka	N/A	N/A	G	Jr.	Washington, DC, U.S.	Eastern HS
54	Harry Bertrand	N/A	N/A	F	Sr.	N/A	N/A
55	Mario Gregorio	5'8"	N/A	G	Sr.	Washington, DC, U.S.	Central HS
60	Francis "Reds" Daly	6'3"	N/A	G	So.	Washington, DC, U.S.	McKinley Technical HS
80	Tom Nolan	N/A	N/A	F	Sr.	Washington, DC, U.S.	Eastern HS
81	Johnny Frank	N/A	N/A	F	Sr.	Tuckahoe, NY, U.S.	Horace Greeley HS
82	John Schmitt	5'11"	N/A	F	So.	Syracuse, NY, U.S.	St. John's Preparatory School (New York, NY)
84	Harry Bassin	N/A	N/A	G	Sr.	Washington, DC, U.S.	Eastern HS
85	Mike Petrosky	6'4"	N/A	C	Sr.	New London, CT, U.S.	Bulkeley HS
N/A	Bill Burke	N/A	N/A	G	Sr.	Washington, DC, U.S.	Central HS
N/A	Harry Leber	N/A	N/A	G	Sr.	N/A	N/A
N/A	John Riches	N/A	N/A	G	Sr.	N/A	N/A

== 1937–38 schedule and results ==
Date time, TV	Opponent	Result	Record	Site city, state
Regular Season
Thu., Dec. 16, 1937* no, no	Western Maryland	W 55–31	1–0	Tech Gymnasium; Washington, DC
Wed., Jan. 5, 1938* no, no	at New York University	L 41–49	1–1	Madison Square Garden; New York, NY
Mon., Jan. 10, 1938 no, no	vs. Temple	W 39–22	2–1 (1–0)	Ritchie Coliseum; College Park, MD
Wed., Jan. 12, 1938* no, no	Maryland	W 57–39	3–1	Tech Gymnasium; Washington, DC
Fri., Jan. 21, 1938 no, no	at Pittsburgh	W 50–47	4–1 (2–0)	Pitt Pavilion; Pittsburgh, PA
Sat., Jan. 22, 1938 no, no	at Penn State	L 23–42	4–2 (2–1)	Recreation Hall; State College, PA
Sat., Jan. 29, 1938* no, no	at Syracuse; Rivalry	L 26–43	4–3	Archbold Gymnasium; Syracuse, NY
Tue., Feb. 1, 1938* no, no	at Fordham	L 36–38 ^{OT}	4–4	Rose Hill Gymnasium; Bronx, NY
Wed., Feb. 2, 1938* no, no	at Army	L 30–50	4–5	Hayes Gymnasium; West Point, NY
Sat., Feb. 5, 1938 no, no	Penn State	L 33–34 ^{OT}	4–6 (2–2)	Tech Gymnasium; Washington, DC
Mon., Feb. 7, 1938 no, no	West Virginia	W 40–36	5–6 (3–2)	Tech Gymnasium; Washington, DC
Fri., Feb. 11, 1938 no, no	at Carnegie Tech	L 31–54	5–7 (3–3)	Skibo Gymnasium; Pittsburgh, PA
Sat., Feb. 12, 1938 no, no	at West Virginia	L 39–47	5–8 (3–4)	WVU Field House; Morgantown, WV
Sat., Feb. 19, 1938 no, no	Pittsburgh	W 34–22	6–8 (4–4)	Tech Gymnasium; Washington, DC
Mon., Feb. 21, 1938* no, no	New York University	L 27–33	6–9	Tech Gymnasium; Washington, DC
Wed., Feb. 23, 1938 no, no	Carnegie Tech	W 45–41	7–9 (5–4)	Tech Gymnasium; Washington, DC
Fri., Feb. 25, 1938 no, no	at Temple	L 34–51	7–10 (5–5)	Philadelphia Convention Hall; Philadelphia, PA
Sat., Feb. 26, 1938* no, no	at Yale	L 38–39 ^{OT}	7–11	Payne Whitney Gymnasium; New Haven, CT
*Non-conference game. (#) Tournament seedings in parentheses.
