= 1937–38 Temple Owls men's basketball team =

American college basketball season

1937–38 Temple Owls men's basketball

National Invitation Tournament Champions Helms Foundation National Champions EIC Champions
- Conference: Eastern Intercollegiate Conference
- Record: 23–2 (9–1 EIC)
- Head coach: James Usilton (12th season)
- MVP: Don Shields

1937–38 Eastern Intercollegiate Conference men's basketball standings
	Conf.				Overall
Team	W		L	PCT	W		L	PCT
Temple	9	–	1	.900	23	–	2	.920
Penn State	6	–	4	.600	13	–	5	.722
Pittsburgh	5	–	5	.500	9	–	12	.429
Georgetown	5	–	5	.500	7	–	11	.389
Carnegie Tech	3	–	7	.300	3	–	7	.300
West Virginia	2	–	8	.200	6	–	13	.316

The 1937–38 Temple Owls men's basketball team represented Temple University during the 1937–38 NCAA men's basketball season in the United States. The head coach was James Usilton, coaching in his 12th season with the Owls. The Owls finished the season with a 23–2 record, going 9–1 in conference play to win the Eastern Intercollegiate Conference championship.

The Owls entered the inaugural National Invitation Tournament (NIT) and won the championship in three games. The team was hailed as national champions after their Invitation win.

The team was later retroactively named the national champion by the Helms Athletic Foundation and was also retroactively listed as the top team of the season by the Premo-Porretta Power Poll.

== Schedule and results ==
Date time, TV	Rank^{#}	Opponent^{#}	Result	Record	Site city, state
Regular season
12/18/1937*		St. John's (MD)	W 54–26	1–0	Mitten Hall; Philadelphia, PA
12/20/1937*		Illinois	W 51–38	2–0	Philadelphia Arena; Philadelphia, PA
12/30/1937*		Stanford	W 35–31	3–0	Convention Hall; Philadelphia, PA
1/7/1938*		SMU	W 53–41	4–0	Philadelphia Arena; Philadelphia, PA
1/10/1938		vs. Georgetown	L 22–39	4–1 (0–1)	Ritchie Coliseum; College Park, MD
1/12/1938*		Muhlenberg	W 40–23	5–1	Philadelphia Arena; Philadelphia, PA
1/14/1938*		at Manhattan	W 45–38	6–1	Manhattan, NY
1/18/1938		at West Virginia	W 34–31	7–1 (1–1)	WVU Fieldhouse; Morgantown, WV
1/20/1938		at Carnegie Mellon	W 39–37	8–1 (2–1)	Pittsburgh, PA
1/22/1938*		at La Salle	W 37–22	9–1	Convention Hall; Philadelphia, PA
1/28/1938*		Villanova	L 28–36	9–2	Convention Hall; Philadelphia, PA
2/4/1938		Penn State	W 49–25	10–2 (3–1)	Philadelphia Arena; Philadelphia, PA
2/5/1938		West Virginia	W 51–32	11–2 (4–1)	Mitten Hall; Philadelphia, PA
2/8/1938		at Penn State	W 49–39	12–2 (5–1)	Rec Hall; University Park, PA
2/9/1938		at Pittsburgh	W 43–41	13–2 (6–1)	Pitt Pavilion; Pittsburgh, PA
2/12/1938*		NYU	W 42–34	14–2	Convention Hall; Philadelphia, PA
2/14/1938		Carnegie Mellon	W 48–39	15–2 (7–1)	Mitten Hall; Philadelphia, PA
2/16/1938*		at Navy	W 61–58	16–2	Annapolis, MD
2/18/1938		Pittsburgh	W 46–34	17–2 (8–1)	Philadelphia Arena; Philadelphia, PA
2/23/1938*		Albright	W 46–25	18–2	Convention Hall; Philadelphia, PA
2/25/1938		Georgetown	W 51–34	19–2 (9–1)	Philadelphia Arena; Philadelphia, PA
3/4/1938*		Saint Joseph's; Rivalry	W 40–34	20–2	Convention Hall; Philadelphia, PA
National Invitation Tournament
3/9/1938*		vs. Bradley; NIT Quarterfinals	W 53–40	21–2	Madison Square Garden; New York, NY
3/14/1938*		vs. Oklahoma A&M; NIT Semifinals	W 56–44	22–2	Madison Square Garden; New York, NY
3/16/1938*		vs. Colorado; NIT Championship	W 60–36	23–2	Madison Square Garden; New York, NY
*Non-conference game. ^{#}Rankings from AP Poll. (#) Tournament seedings in parentheses.
