= 1938 in basketball =

The following are the basketball events of the year 1938 throughout the world.

== Events ==
- March – The first National Invitation Tournament (NIT) was played. On March 16, Temple University defeated the University of Colorado 60–36 in New York City to become the inaugural champions of this annual tournament.

== Tournaments ==
=== College ===
Men

- (United States) NCAA
  - National Invitation Tournament: Temple 60, Colorado 36
- (United States) NAIA
  - NAIA: Central Missouri State Mules basketball 45, Roanoke 30
