= National championships in men's college basketball =

Annual selection of best U.S. college basketball team

National championships Men's college basketball
- Current season, competition or edition: 2026–27 NCAA Division I men's basketball season
- Sport: College basketball
- First season: 1892–93
- Organizing body: NCAA
- Country: United States
- Most recent champion: Michigan
- Most titles: UCLA (11 titles)

A national championship at the highest level of men's college basketball, currently NCAA Division I, is a designation awarded annually to the best college basketball team in the United States. The national championship is currently won by the champion of the NCAA Division I men's basketball tournament, a single-elimination tournament played to determine the men's Division I basketball champion. The NCAA tournament was first played in 1939, 40 to 50 years after the first college basketball games in the 1890s following the game's invention by James Naismith.

Prior to the establishment and sustained success of the annual NCAA tournament, the national collegiate basketball title was considered a "mythical national championship". Much like national championships in college football, national championships in college basketball were claimed by schools, named by sportswriters, awarded by various organizations, and won on the court in occasional intersectional post-season games between conference or regional champions.

The National Invitation Tournament (NIT) was established in 1938, one year before the NCAA tournament. During the early years of the two tournaments the NIT and NCAA competed against each other, giving rise to debate over their relative prowess. During the next two decades the relative status of the two tournaments was unclear, and thus some years produced disputed national championship claims between the tournament winners. In 1950, the City College of New York became the first and only team to complete the "grand slam" of college basketball by winning the NIT and NCAA tournaments in the same year. The NIT and NCAA champions played each other four times in post-tournament competition to settle the title; in all four cases the NCAA champion was victorious.

Through shrewd competitive actions the NCAA positioned its tournament to match and then surpass the NIT. Fallout from the 1951 point-shaving scandal severely damaged the reputation of the NIT and basketball in New York City; the NCAA seized the initiative by abandoning scandal-plagued Madison Square Garden and expanding its tournament field to include more conference champions. The UCLA dynasty under head coach John Wooden, who won 10 national championships in the NCAA tournament between 1964 and 1975, further cemented the NCAA's dominance as did the tournament's expansion to 32 and then 64 teams. The "March Madness" phenomenon grew with prime-time network coverage of championship games and ESPN's coverage of the early rounds, leaving the NCAA contest as the clear top post-season tournament and sole determiner of the national championship.

== Pre-tournament era (1892–1938) ==
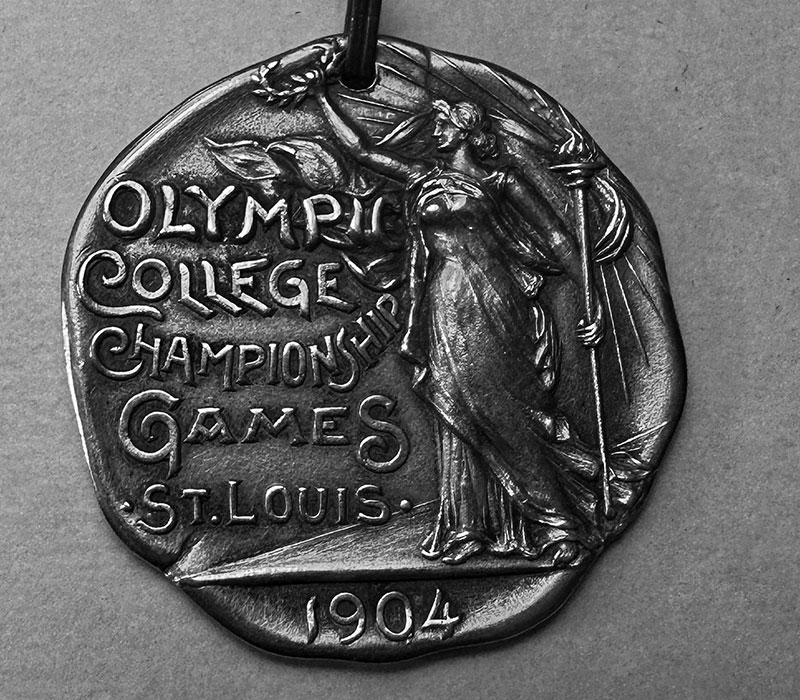
Gold medal won by Hiram College at the 1904 Olympic Games in St. Louis.

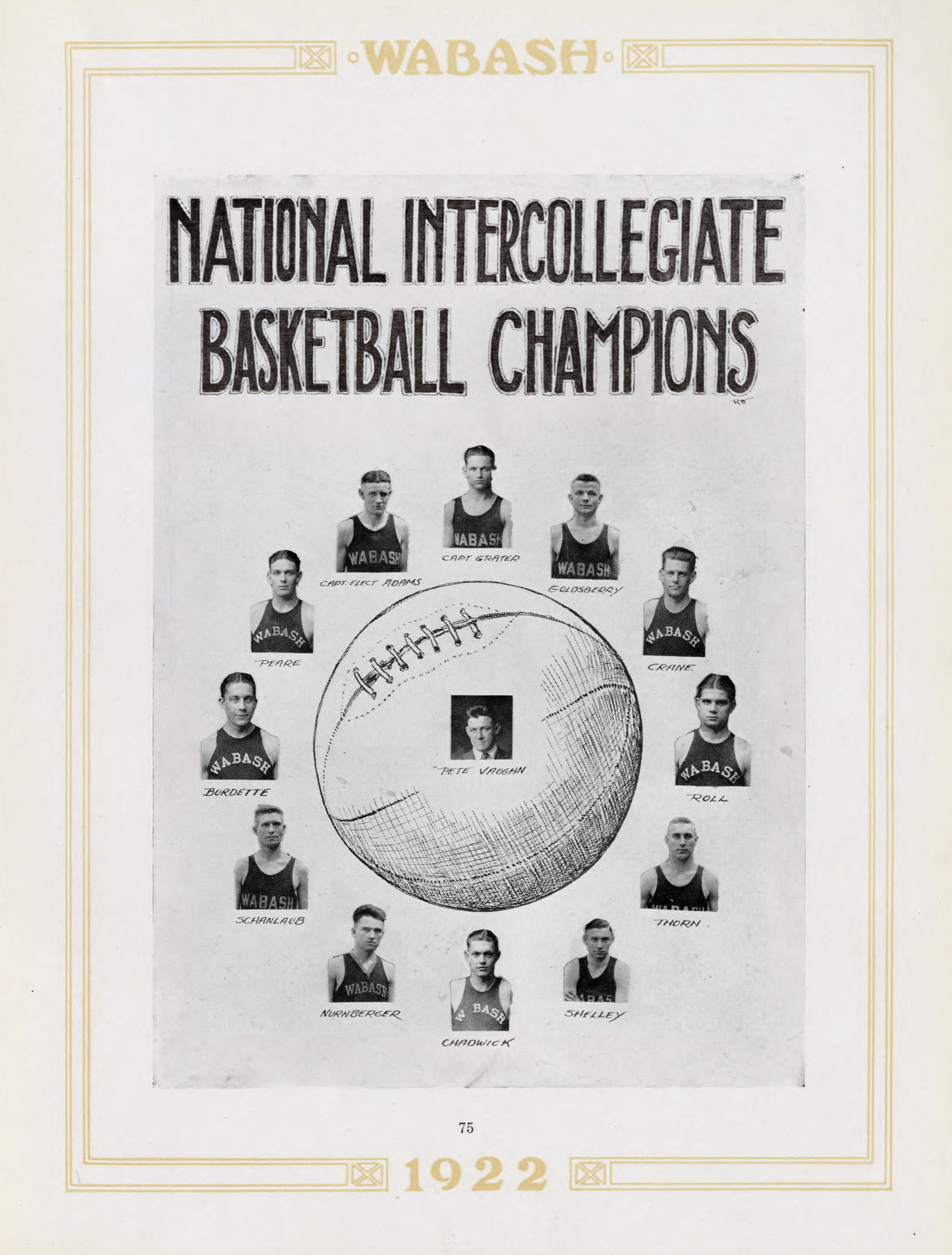
Wabash College won the national intercollegiate basketball tournament in 1922

1929 national championship trophy awarded to Butler by the Veteran Athletes of Philadelphia

The concept of a national championship in college basketball dates back to the earliest years of the sport in the 1890s. James Naismith's original announcement of the new game of "Basket Ball" and the sport's original 13 rules were published in the January 1892 issue of The Triangle, a magazine published by the students of the International YMCA Training School in Springfield, Massachusetts. An article in this same publication, then titled Physical Education, in April 1893 called for the formation of three basketball leagues made up of YMCAs, colleges, and amateur athletic clubs to each compete for a "Trophy or Championship Emblem". The national champions of the three leagues would then compete in a "triangular contest for the Supreme Championship". The 1898 Spalding's Guide noted that this early suggestion for leagues and national championships was premature, "for it wasn't until 1895 that the athletic clubs gave the game its due recognition, and even up to the present time comparatively few colleges are interested in the game."

Yale claimed the "basket ball championship of the United States" as early as 1899. In 1902, Minnesota claimed the national college championship citing their 15–0 unblemished record and win over eastern champion Yale. Going further, they asserted that their win over the champion Company E team of Fond du Lac entitled them to the full amateur basketball championship of the United States. In 1903 and 1904 Minnesota sought to play eastern champions Yale and Columbia in post-season games to decide the national title, but in both cases were refused. Columbia claimed the 1905 title with two wins over traveling Western Conference quints.

Hiram College won the Olympic college basketball championship at the 1904 Olympic Games in St. Louis. Hiram competed in a round-robin competition with two other American schools, Wheton College and Latter-day Saints' University, winning both of their games. The victors were awarded Olympic gold medals along with a banner proclaiming the "Olympic World's College Basket Ball Championship". The 1904 Spalding's Guide presciently described the tournament:

This tournament marks the beginning of what may in the years to come be an annual fixture, namely — a National College Basket Ball Championship held annually between the colleges of the U.S. played in alternate years in the East and West.
Such a championship could easily be made a great athletic and social event.

— "The First Olympic College Basket Ball Championship", Spalding's Official Basket Ball Guide (1904)

Four years later, in 1908, Western Conference champion Chicago played Eastern Intercollegiate Basketball League champion Pennsylvania in an ad hoc best-of-three post-season playoff. Chicago won the series in two games, and with it the national intercollegiate championship. The following season Chicago went 12–0 and again won the Western Conference championship but was unable to schedule games with eastern champion Columbia to decide the national title.

The first collegiate team to win the Amateur Athletic Union basketball tournament was Utah in 1916. They were followed by NYU in 1920, Butler in 1924, and Washburn in 1925.

In 1920, Chicago again met Pennsylvania in a playoff between Western Conference and Eastern Intercollegiate Basketball League champions. The series went to three games, with the championship played on March 27 at a neutral site at the Princeton Gymnasium. Penn was victorious and won the national title.

Wabash College won the inaugural national intercollegiate basketball tournament in 1922. The tournament was not played again.

The Veteran Athletes of Philadelphia awarded national basketball championship trophies for 1928 and 1929, mirroring the Bonniwell Trophy that the organization awarded three times to the Notre Dame football team. The organization deemed Pittsburgh the champion of the 1927–28 season and awarded the Panthers the U. S. Senator Boies Penrose Memorial Trophy. The following year it named Butler the champion of the 1928–29 season and awarded the Bulldogs the John J. McDevitt Trophy.

In 1935, the American Legion sponsored an intersectional "Rose Bowl", promoted as a basketball game "for the national collegiate title," on April 13 at the Convention Hall in Atlantic City, New Jersey. LSU defeated Pittsburgh 41–37 and claim the national collegiate basketball championship based on this victory.

The Helms Athletic Foundation published, in 1943 and 1957, retrospective lists of 'National Collegiate Champions' for the early years of the sport. The Helms selections were made by the organization's co-founder and managing director Bill Schroeder, based upon historic research and consultation with coaches, sportswriters, and other basketball authorities. The pre-tournament Helms selections were adopted by the NCAA and are included in the official Division I Men's Basketball Records book as the "Final Regular-Season Poll" leaders for the years prior to the start of the AP poll for college basketball in 1948–49.

In 1995 the Premo Power Poll, a mathematical system used to rank college basketball teams, was published in the Encyclopedia of College Basketball. The rankings were slightly modified and published as the Premo-Porretta Power Poll in the ESPN College Basketball Encyclopedia in 2009. These rankings stretch back to the very earliest days of the sport, long before nation-wide polling, and rank the teams based on strength of schedule.

Pre-tournament national championships and No. 1 rankings (1892–1938)
Season	Champion(s)	Record	Coach	Tournament	Claims and selections	Retroactive selections
1893	Iowa	2–0–1				Premo
1894	Hiram	1–0				Premo
1895	Temple	8–3				Premo
1896	Temple	15–7				Premo
1896	Yale	8–5	Henry Anderson			Premo-Porretta
1897	Yale	11–5	Henry Anderson			Premo-Porretta
1898	Mount Union	8–1	—			Premo-Porretta
1899	Yale	8–1	—		Claim	Premo-Porretta
1900	Yale	9–6	—			Premo-Porretta
1901	Bucknell	12–1	—			Premo-Porretta
1901	Dartmouth	16–2	Walter McCornack			Helms
1902	Minnesota	15–0	L. J. Cooke		Claim	Helms, Premo-Porretta
1903	Minnesota	13–0	L. J. Cooke		Claim	Premo-Porretta
1903	Yale	15–1	Yale Murphy			Helms
1904	Columbia	17–1	—			Helms, Premo-Porretta
1904	Hiram	9–3	—	Olympic gold medal		
1905	Columbia	19–1	—		Claim	Helms, Premo-Porretta
1905	Williams	20–2			Claim	
1906	Dartmouth	16–2	Walter McCornack			Helms
1906	Wabash	17–1	Ralph Jones			Premo-Porretta
1907	Chicago	22–2	Joseph Raycroft			Helms, Premo
1907	Williams	15–1	—		Claim	Premo-Porretta
1908	Chicago	21–2	Joseph Raycroft	Postseason championship		Helms
1908	Wabash	24–0	Ralph Jones			Premo-Porretta
1909	Chicago	12–0	Joseph Raycroft			Helms, Premo-Porretta
1910	Columbia	11–1	Harry A. Fisher			Helms
1910	Williams	11–0	—			Premo-Porretta
1911	St. John's	14–0	Claude Allen		Claim	Helms, Premo-Porretta
1912	Wisconsin	15–0	Walter Meanwell			Helms, Premo-Porretta
1913	Navy	9–0	Frank Gorton			Helms, Premo-Porretta
1914	Wisconsin	15–0	Walter Meanwell			Helms, Premo-Porretta
1915	Illinois	16–0	Ralph Jones			Helms, Premo-Porretta
1916	Wisconsin	20–1	Walter Meanwell			Helms, Premo-Porretta
1916	Utah	10–0	Nelson Norgren	AAU tournament		—
1917	Washington State	25–1	Fred Bohler			Helms, Premo-Porretta
1918	Syracuse	16–1	Lew Andreas			Helms, Premo-Porretta
1919	Minnesota	13–0	L. J. Cooke			Helms
1919	Navy	16–0	Bob Folwell			Premo-Porretta
1920	NYU	16–1	Ed Thorp	AAU tournament		—
1920	Penn	22–1	Edward McNichol	Postseason championship		Helms, Premo-Porretta
1921	Missouri	17–1	J. Craig Ruby			Premo-Porretta
1921	Penn	21–2	Edward McNichol			Helms
1922	Kansas	16–2	Phog Allen			Helms
1922	Missouri	16–1	J. Craig Ruby			Premo-Porretta
1922	Wabash	22–3	Pete Vaughan	Postseason tournament		
1923	Army	17–0	Harry Fisher			Premo-Porretta
1923	Kansas	17–1	Phog Allen			Helms
1924	Butler	—	Harlan Page	AAU tournament		
1924	North Carolina	26–0	Norman Shepard			Helms, Premo-Porretta
1925	Princeton	21–2	Albert Wittmer			Helms, Premo-Porretta
1925	Washburn		Dutch Lonborg	AAU tournament		—
1926	Syracuse	19–1	Lew Andreas			Helms, Premo-Porretta
1927	California	17–0	Nibs Price			Premo-Porretta
1927	Notre Dame	19–1	George Keogan			Helms, Premo
1928	Pittsburgh	21–0	Doc Carlson		Veteran Athletes of Philadelphia	Helms, Premo-Porretta
1929	Butler	17-2	Tony Hinkle		Veteran Athletes of Philadelphia	
1929	Montana State	35–2	Schubert R. Dyche			Helms, Premo-Porretta
1930	Alabama	20–0	Hank Crisp			Premo-Porretta
1930	Pittsburgh	23–2	Doc Carlson			Helms
1931	Northwestern	16–1	Dutch Lonborg			Helms, Premo-Porretta
1932	Purdue	17–1	Ward Lambert			Helms, Premo-Porretta
1933	Kentucky	21–3	Adolph Rupp			Helms
1933	Texas	13–6	Ed Olle			Premo-Porretta
1934	Kentucky	16–1	Adolph Rupp			Premo-Porretta
1934	South Carolina	18–1	Rock Norman			Premo
1934	Wyoming	26–4	Willard Witte			Helms
1935	LSU	14–1	Harry Rabenhorst	American Legion "Rose Bowl"		
1935	NYU	18–1	Howard Cann			Helms, Premo-Porretta
1935	Richmond	20–0	Malcolm Pitt			Premo
1936	Long Island	23–0	Clair Bee			Premo-Porretta
1936	Notre Dame	22–2–1	George Keogan			Helms
1937	Stanford	25–2	John Bunn			Helms, Premo-Porretta
1938	Temple	23–2	James Usilton	National Invitation	Stephen Girard Lions Club	Helms, Premo-Porretta

- Teams and selectors listed in italics indicate retroactively applied championships.

== Early NIT and NCAA tournament era (1938–1950s) ==
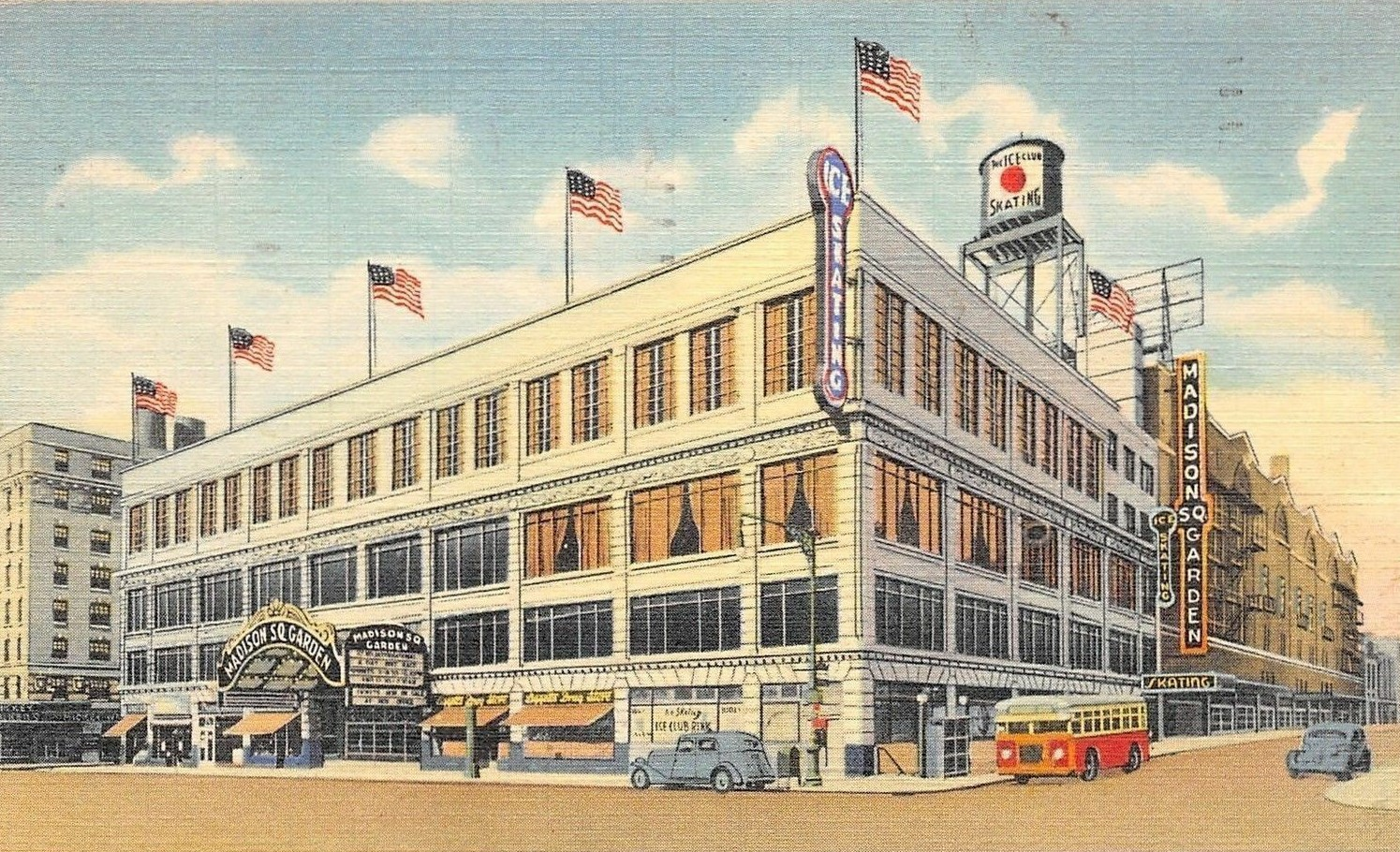
Madison Square Garden, home of the NIT and venue of seven NCAA championship games between 1943 and 1950.

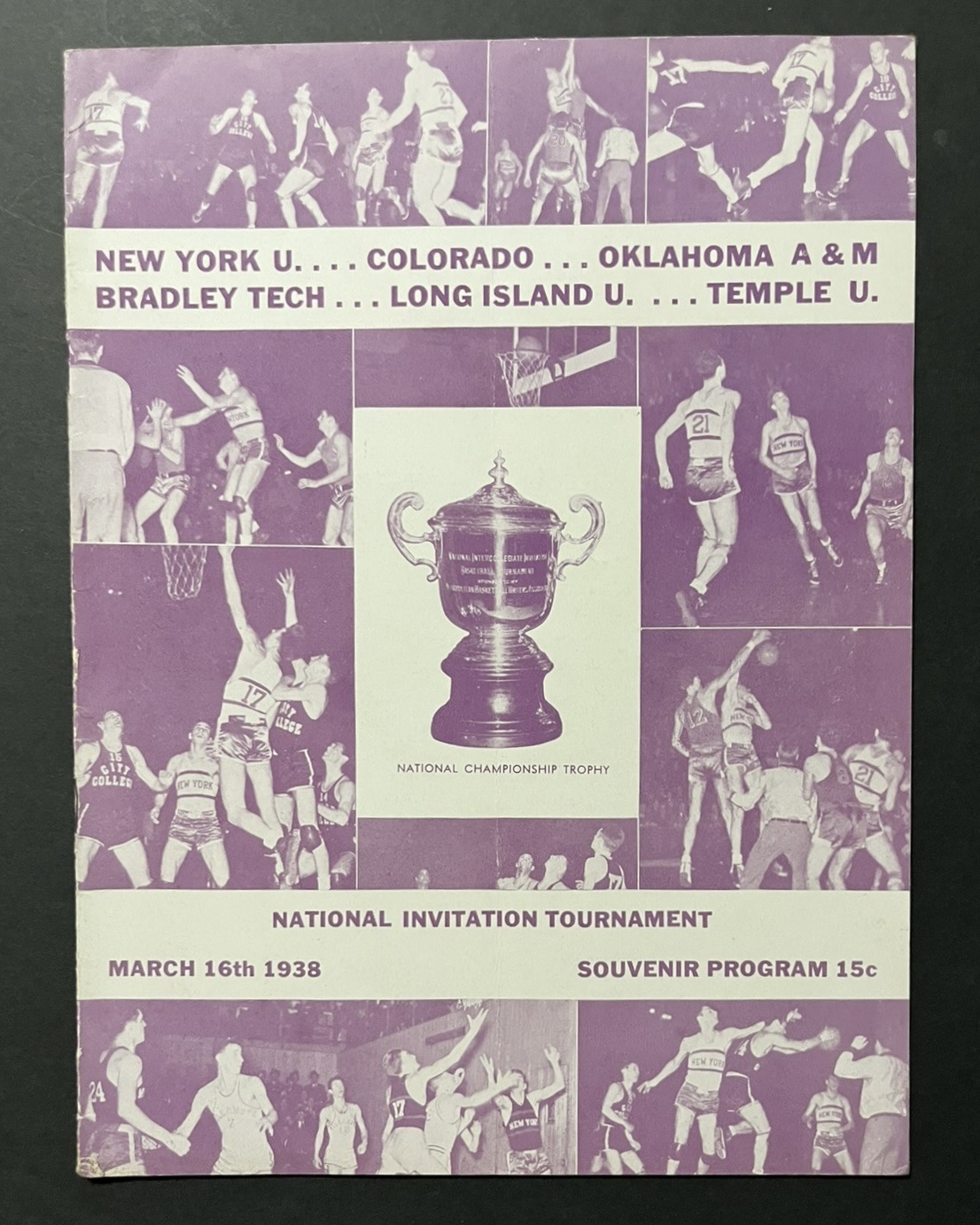
Souvenir program from the inaugural NIT showcasing the "National Championship Trophy" won by Temple in 1938.

The National Invitation Tournament (NIT) was established in 1938, hosted at Madison Square Garden by the Metropolitan Basketball Writers Association. The post-season Invitation was an extension of the New York City games assembled by basketball promoter Ned Irish, who since 1934 had been organizing regular-season double-headers at the Garden matching the nation's top teams. Playing at the "Mecca of college basketball" in front of the national sports press granted the invited teams a high level of exposure, prize money, and prestige. The Temple Owls won the first NIT title and were hailed as national champions.

The NIT's success inspired the National Association of Basketball Coaches, led by Kansas coach Phog Allen, to conduct their own championship tournament that was open only to NCAA-member schools. The two tournaments closed out the 1939 season. On March 23 undefeated Long Island won the NIT, while on March 27 Oregon won the NCAA championship. Both teams were recognized as national champions and asserted claims on the "mythical" national title.

In 1940, Colorado and Duquesne were the first teams to play in both tournaments. Colorado won the NIT but then lost to USC in the first round of the NCAA tournament, then lost again in the Western region consolation game, thus ceding any national claim to eventual NCAA champion Indiana. Long Island and West Virginia, Invitation champions in 1941 and 1942, both treat their NIT titles as national championships.

The NCAA finals moved to Madison Square Garden in 1943 in an effort to match the big-city grandeur of the NIT. During World War II, the shared venue allowed for the scheduling of post-tournament benefit games between the NIT and NCAA champions with proceeds going to the American Red Cross. The three games from 1943 to 1945 were all won by the NCAA champion, in each case settling the question of the season's national championship. This "mythical national championship" game between the tournament winners was not continued in 1946 or 1947 despite some efforts to arrange it.

Trials for membership on the United States men's national basketball team offered another avenue of competition for tournament winners. For the 1952 Olympics in Helsinki, NCAA champions Kansas beat NAIA champions Southwest Missouri State and then NIT champions La Salle to place seven Jayhawks on the Olympic team that went on to win gold. For 1956 the Olympic Trials format changed, with a 14-man all-star team instead being selected from among all college quintets.

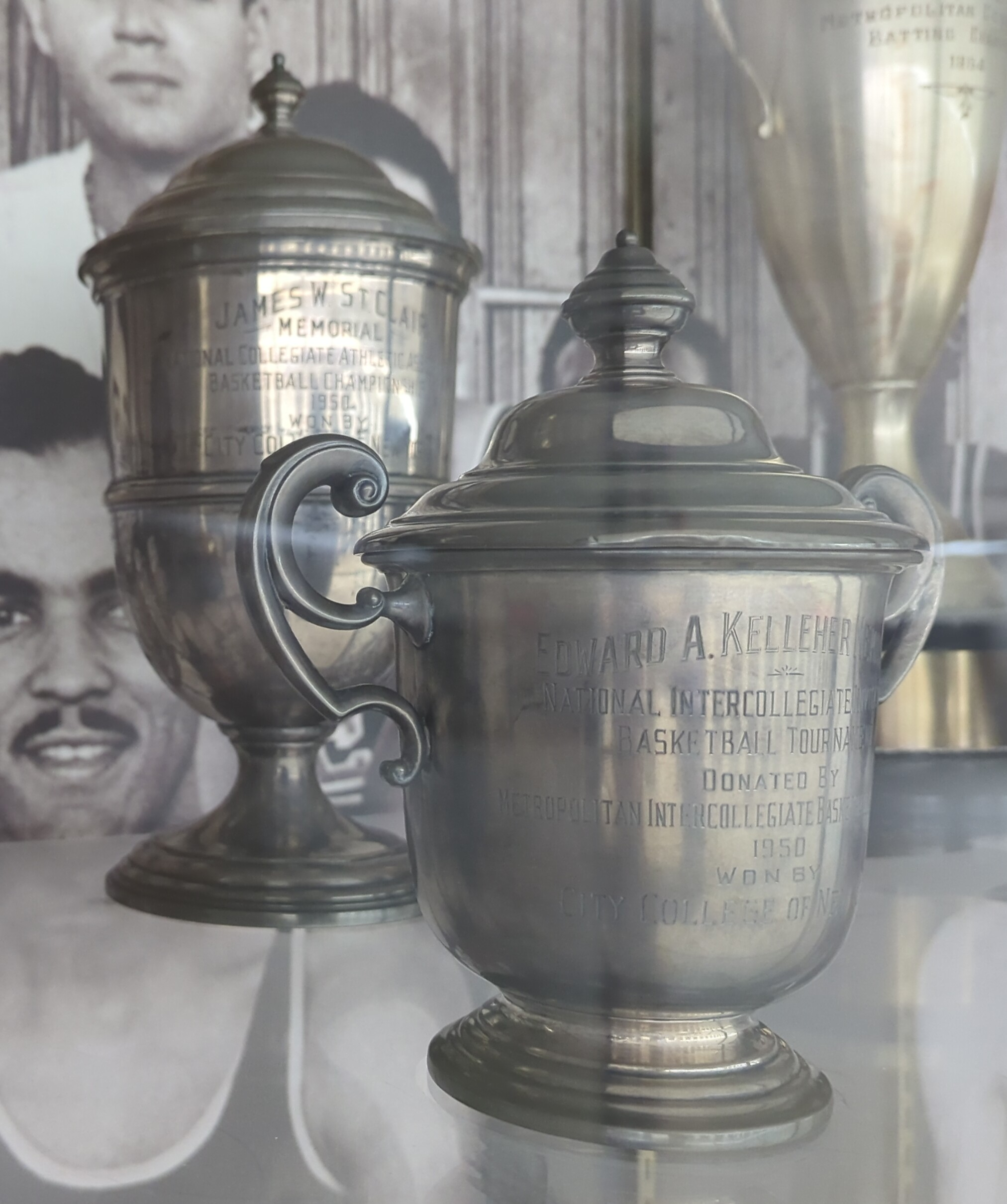
The Edward A. Kelleher Memorial Trophy (NIT) and James W. St. Clair Memorial Trophy (NCAA), both won by CCNY in 1950.

In 1950, the City College of New York became the first and only team to complete the "grand slam" of college basketball by winning the NIT and NCAA tournaments in the same year, defeating Bradley in both championship games and claiming the undisputed national title.

Fallout from the 1951 point-shaving scandal severely damaged the reputation of the NIT and basketball in New York City. The NCAA tournament successfully separated itself from the NIT in the wake of this far-reaching scandal by moving its finals out of Madison Square Garden, the very same venue that had contributed so massively to the tournament's growth and success in the 1940s. Now played in on-campus arenas, satisfying college administrators, the tournament also surpassed the NIT by expanding its field from 8 to 16 teams in 1951. The NIT had grown to 12 teams in 1949 and would stay there until 1965, while the ever-expanding NCAA tournament quickly jumped to 22 teams in 1953 and 25 teams by 1956.

The popularity of the two tournaments did not fully preclude other teams from being lauded with national championship honors. In 1944 undefeated 15–0 Army was honored by the Helms Athletic Foundation and was the No. 1 team in the final post-tournament Converse-Dunkel Basketball Forecast. In 1954 25–0 SEC champions Kentucky were the top team in the nation, but three of the team's star players were ruled ineligible for post-season play by the NCAA due to graduation. Head coach Adolph Rupp kept the team out of the competition in protest; the Wildcats retained their No. 1 ranking in the post-tournament final AP Poll and collected the Helms Athletic Foundation selection.

NIT and NCAA tournament champions and other No. 1 rankings (1938–1950s)
Season	Champions	Record	Coach	Tournament	Other selectors
1938	Temple	23–2	James Usilton	NIT	Helms, Premo-Porretta
1939	Long Island	23–0	Clair Bee	NIT	Dunkel, Helms, Premo-Porretta
1939	Oregon	29–5	Howard Hobson	NCAA	
1940	Colorado (Note: In 1940, Colorado won the NIT before finishing fourth in the Western region of the NCAA tournament. Duquesne also played in both tournaments.)	17–4	Frosty Cox	NIT	
1940	Indiana	20–3	Branch McCracken	NCAA	Premo-Porretta
1940	USC	20–3	Sam Barry	—	Dunkel, Helms
1941	Long Island	25–2	Clair Bee	NIT	Premo-Porretta
1941	Wisconsin	20–3	Harold E. Foster	NCAA	Helms
1942	West Virginia	19–4	Dyke Raese	NIT	
1942	Stanford	28–4	Everett Dean	NCAA	Helms, Premo-Porretta
1943	St. John's	21–3	Joe Lapchick	NIT	
1943	Wyoming	31–2	Everett Shelton	NCAA	Red Cross, Helms
1943	Illinois	17–1	Douglas R. Mills	—	Dunkel, Premo-Porretta
1944	St. John's	18–5	Joe Lapchick	NIT	
1944	Utah (Note: In 1944, Utah lost in the first round of the NIT. They then won the NCAA tournament after entering as a late replacement for Arkansas, whose team was involved in a serious traffic collision. NCAA champion Utah then defeated NIT champion St. John's in the post-tournament Red Cross benefit game.)	22–4	Vadal Peterson	NCAA	Red Cross
1944	Army	15–0	Ed Kelleher	—	Dunkel, Helms, Premo-Porretta
1945	DePaul	21–3	Ray Meyer	NIT	
1945	Oklahoma A&M	27–4	Henry Iba	NCAA	Red Cross, Dunkel, Helms
1945	Iowa	17–1	Pops Harrison	—	Premo-Porretta
1946	Kentucky	28–2	Adolph Rupp	NIT	
1946	Oklahoma A&M	31–2	Henry Iba	NCAA	Dunkel, Helms, Premo-Porretta
1947	Utah	19–5	Vadal Peterson	NIT	Dunkel
1947	Holy Cross	27–3	Doggie Julian	NCAA	Helms
1947	Kentucky	34–3	Adolph Rupp	—	Premo-Porretta
1948	Saint Louis	24-3	Eddie Hickey	NIT	
1948	Kentucky	36–3	Adolph Rupp	NCAA	Olympic Trials, Dunkel, Helms, Premo-Porretta
1949	San Francisco	25–5	Pete Newell	NIT	
1949	Kentucky (Note: In 1949, Kentucky lost their first game in the NIT before winning the NCAA tournament.)	32–2	Adolph Rupp	NCAA	AP, Dunkel, Helms
1950	CCNY (Note: In 1950, CCNY won both the NIT and NCAA titles. Bradley was the runner-up in both tournaments.)	24–5	Nat Holman	NIT	Dunkel, Helms
1950	CCNY	24–5	Nat Holman	NCAA	Dunkel, Helms
1951	BYU (Note: In 1951, BYU won the NIT before finishing fourth in the Western region of the NCAA tournament. Arizona, NC State, and St. John's also competed in both tournaments.)	28–9	Stan Watts	NIT	
1951	Kentucky	32–2	Adolph Rupp	NCAA	AP, Dunkel, Helms, UP
1951	Syracuse	19–9	Marc Guley	NCBT	
1952 (Note: In 1952, Dayton, Duquesne, St. John’s, and St. Louis competed in both tournaments.)	La Salle	25–7	Ken Loeffler	NIT	
1952	Kansas	28–3	Phog Allen	NCAA	Olympic Trials, Dunkel, Helms
1953 (Note: Starting in 1953, the NCAA prohibited member institutions from participating in more than one post-season tournament.)	Seton Hall	31–2	Honey Russell	NIT	
1953	Indiana	23–3	Branch McCracken	NCAA	AP, Dunkel, Helms
1954	Holy Cross	26–2	Buster Sheary	NIT	
1954	La Salle	26–4	Ken Loeffler	NCAA	
1954	Kentucky	25–0	Adolph Rupp	—	AP, Dunkel, Helms
1955	Duquesne	22–4	Dudey Moore	NIT	
1955	San Francisco	28–1	Phil Woolpert	NCAA	AP, Dunkel, Helms
1956	Louisville	26–3	Bernard Hickman	NIT	
1956	San Francisco	29–0	Phil Woolpert	NCAA	AP, Dunkel, Helms, UP
1957	Bradley	22–7	Chuck Orsborn	NIT	
1957	North Carolina	32–0	Frank McGuire	NCAA	AP, Helms, UP
1958	Xavier	19–11	Jim McCafferty	NIT	
1958	Kentucky	23–6	Adolph Rupp	NCAA	Helms
1959	St. John's	20–6	Joseph Lapchick	NIT	
1959	California	25–4	Pete Newell	NCAA	Helms

- Teams and selectors listed in italics indicate retroactively applied championships.

Participants in both tournaments

In 1970, Marquette and head coach Al McGuire turned down an invitation to the NCAA tournament due to perceived poor regional seeding and instead played in (and won) the NIT. The NCAA responded to this action by banning invited teams from playing in any other post-season tournament, thus definitively ending the NIT's contention for national championship-caliber teams.

== NCAA tournament champions (1939–present) ==
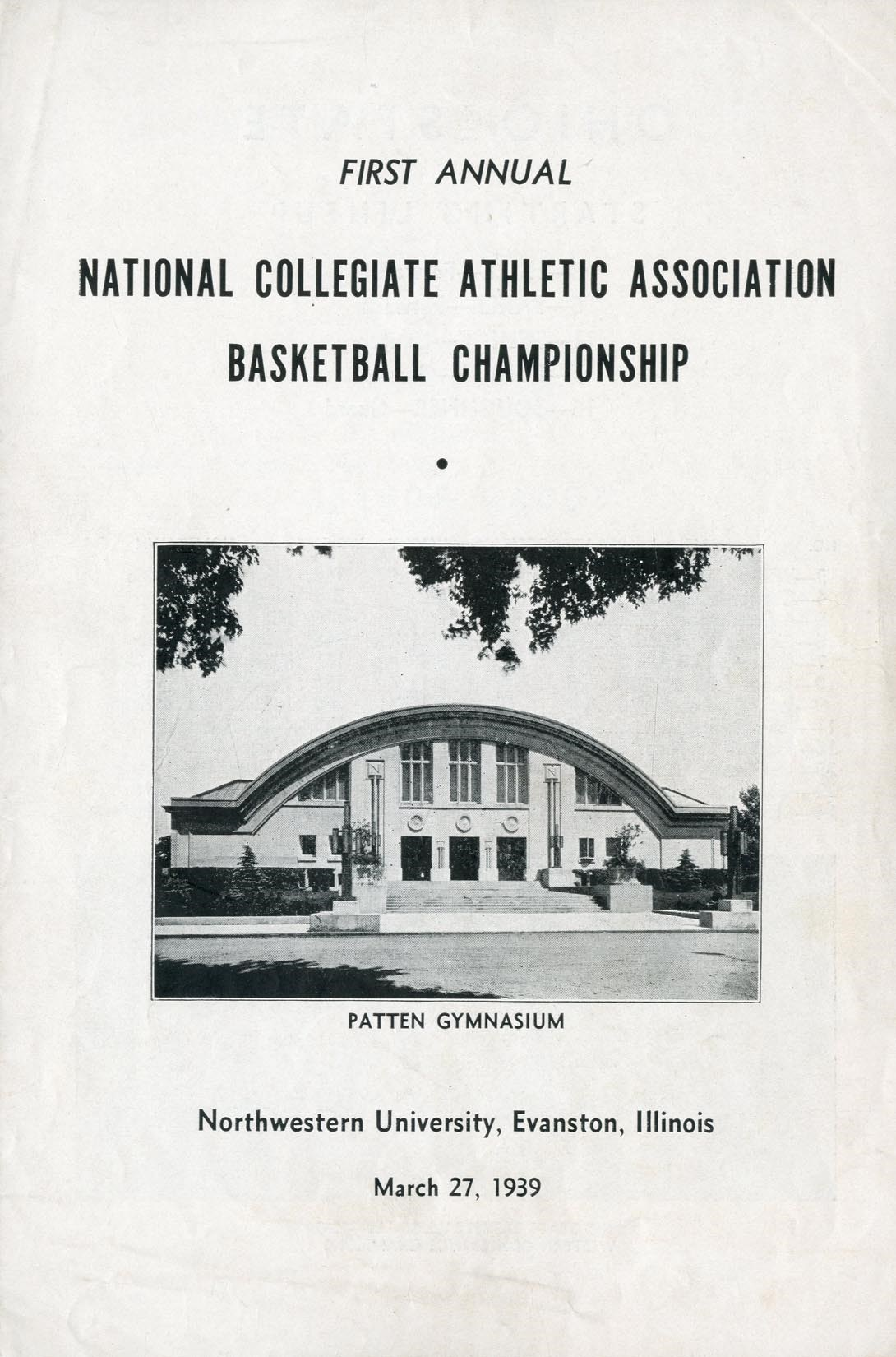
The inaugural NCAA tournament championship game was played on March 27, 1939 at Patten Gymnasium on the campus of Northwestern University in Evanston, Illinois.

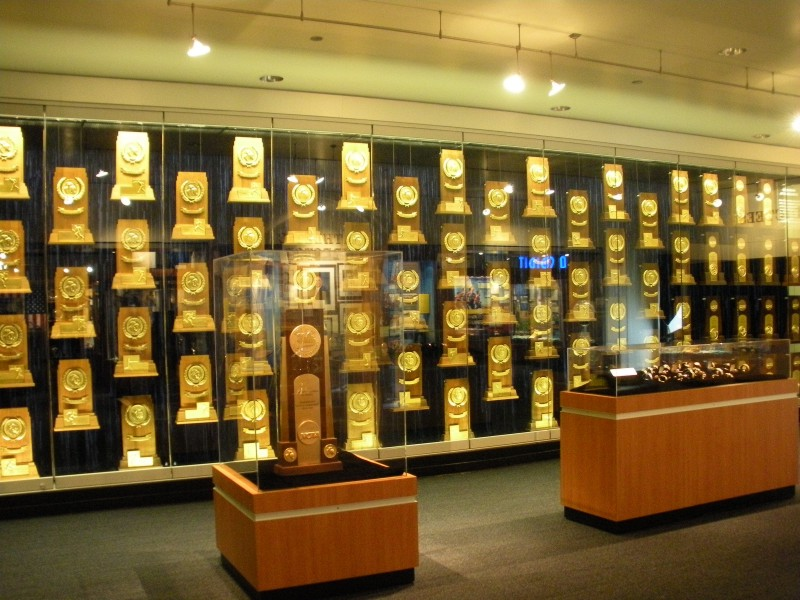
UCLA has won a record 11 NCAA Division I Men's Basketball championships.

The NCAA Division I men's basketball tournament has been played since 1939. In its early years, the NCAA title did not give a team an uncontested claim to the national championship. The inaugural 1939 NCAA basketball tournament was organized directly in response to 1938's National Invitation Tournament and, as documented in the section above, the first two decades of the NCAA tournament were marked by cooperation and competition with the New York City showcase. The NCAA tournament finals were played at NIT venue Madison Square Garden from 1943 to 1948 and in 1950; this move to the Big Apple and the promotional work of Garden boss Ned Irish caused the NCAA tournament's prestige and payouts to grow generously during the 1940s.

The far-reaching 1951 point-shaving scandal implicated tournament winners Kentucky and CCNY along with many other schools, especially those based in New York City. The NCAA deftly responded to this crisis by moving its tournament out of Madison Square Garden and away from the corrupting influence of city gamblers. The 1951 tournament in Minneapolis also doubled its field to 16 teams, extending automatic bids to ten conference champions and six at-large teams. School administrators and the public were swayed by these actions and the NCAA tournament avoided much of the reputational damage suffered by the NIT in the fallout of the scandal.

Beginning in 1964 the tournament's preeminence was strengthened by the UCLA dynasty under head coach John Wooden, who won 10 national championships in 12 years in the NCAA tournament. In 1975 the NCAA repealed the rule that limited the tournament to one team from each conference, strengthening the field. In 1980 nascent sports channel ESPN began airing the early rounds of the tournament on their cable network, leading to the "March Madness" phenomenon and supercharging interest in the tournament. The tournament expanded to 64 teams in 1985.

Today the NCAA tournament is the sole accepted method for determining the national champion.

NCAA tournament championships by team (1939–present)
Team	Wins	NCAA tournament championships
UCLA	11	1964, 1965, 1967, 1968, 1969, 1970, 1971, 1972, 1973, 1975, 1995
Kentucky	8	1948, 1949, 1951, 1958, 1978, 1996, 1998, 2012
North Carolina	6	1957, 1982, 1993, 2005, 2009, 2017
UConn	6	1999, 2004, 2011, 2014, 2023, 2024
Duke	5	1991, 1992, 2001, 2010, 2015
Indiana	5	1940, 1953, 1976, 1981, 1987
Kansas	4	1952, 1988, 2008, 2022
Florida	3	2006, 2007, 2025
Villanova	3	1985, 2016, 2018
Louisville	2	1980, 1986, 2013
Cincinnati	2	1961, 1962
Michigan	2	1989, 2026
Michigan State	2	1979, 2000
NC State	2	1974, 1983
Oklahoma State	2	1945, 1946
San Francisco	2	1955, 1956
Arizona	1	1997
Arkansas	1	1994
Baylor	1	2021
California	1	1959
CCNY	1	1950
Georgetown	1	1984
Holy Cross	1	1947
La Salle	1	1954
Loyola	1	1963
Marquette	1	1977
Maryland	1	2002
Ohio State	1	1960
Oregon	1	1939
Stanford	1	1942
Syracuse	1	2003
UNLV	1	1990
Utah	1	1944
UTEP	1	1966
Virginia	1	2019
Wisconsin	1	1941
Wyoming	1	1943

== National championship claims ==
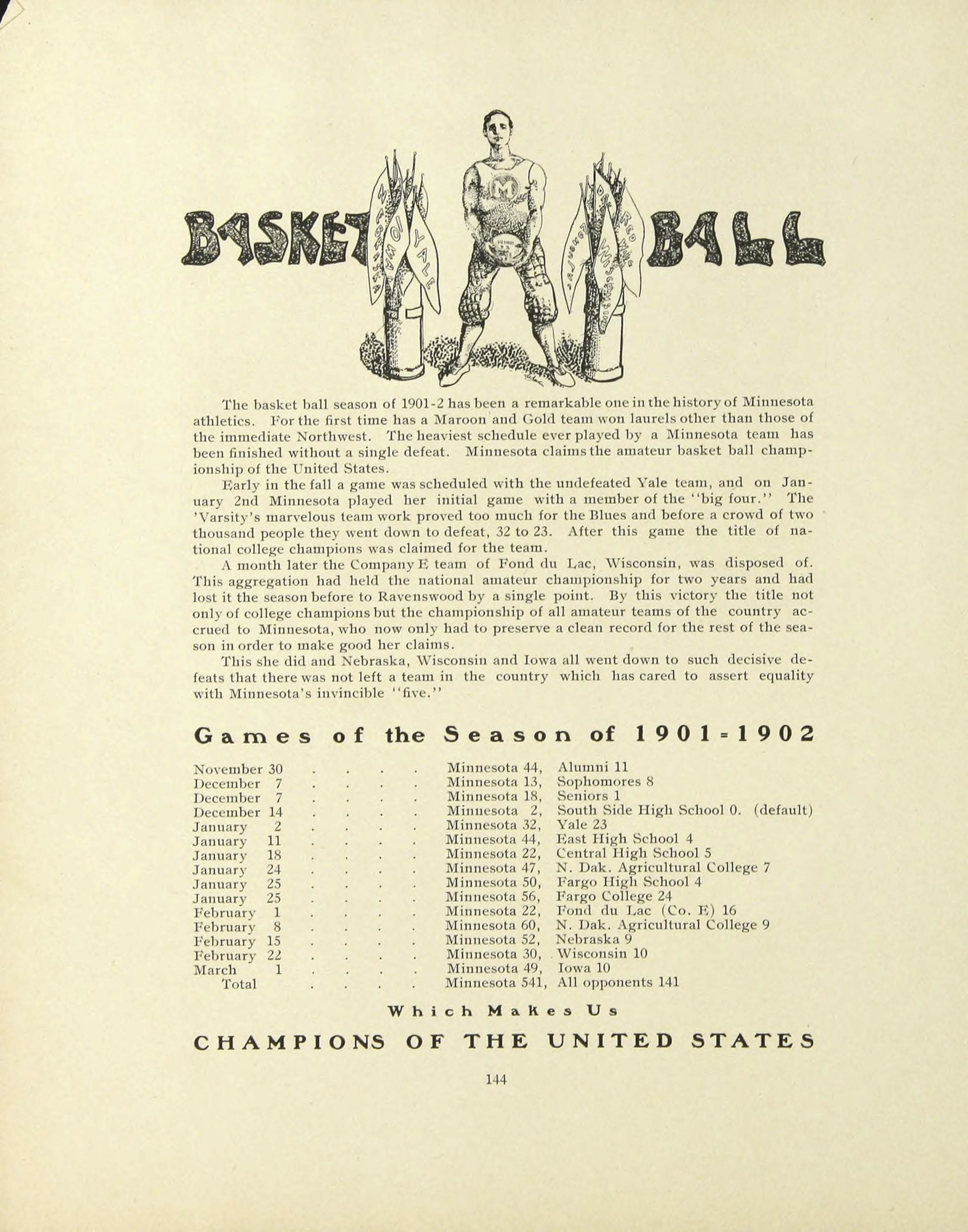
Minnesota claimed the 1902 national championship in the pages of The Gopher yearbook.

The table below contains the national championship seasons as determined by each individual school.

Among the claims are all of the NCAA tournament championships won since 1939. Some NIT championship seasons are claimed as national championships from years in which the Invitation was still a top-tier postseason tournament. The four Amateur Athletic Union tournaments won by collegiate teams are claimed, as are other early playoff and tournament championships. Helms Athletic Foundation national championships are claimed by some schools but ignored by others.

National championship claims by team
Team	Claims	Seasons	Source
UCLA	11	1964, 1965, 1967, 1968, 1969, 1970, 1971, 1972, 1973, 1975, 1995	
Kentucky	8	1948, 1949, 1951, 1958, 1978, 1996, 1998, 2012	
North Carolina	7	1924, 1957, 1982, 1993, 2005, 2009, 2017	
Kansas	6	1922, 1923, 1952, 1988, 2008, 2022	
UConn	6	1999, 2004, 2011, 2014, 2023, 2024	
Duke	5	1991, 1992, 2001, 2010, 2015	
Indiana	5	1940, 1953, 1976, 1981, 1987	
Louisville	5	1948, 1956, 1980, 1986, 2013	
Chicago	3	1908, 1909, 1910	
Florida	3	2006, 2007, 2025	
San Francisco	3	1949, 1955, 1956	
Syracuse	3	1918, 1926, 2003	
Utah	3	1916, 1944, 1947	
Villanova	3	1985, 2016, 2018	
Butler	2	1924, 1929	
Cincinnati	2	1961, 1962	
Holy Cross	2	1947, 1954	
La Salle	2	1952, 1954	
Long Island	2	1939, 1941	
Michigan	2	1989, 2026	
Michigan State	2	1979, 2000	
NC State	2	1974, 1983	
NYU	2	1920, 1935	
Oklahoma State	2	1945, 1946	
Penn	2	1920, 1921	
Pittsburgh	2	1928, 1930	
Stanford	2	1937, 1942	
Minnesota	2	1902, 1919	
Wyoming	2	1934, 1943	
Arizona	1	1997	
Arkansas	1	1994	
Baylor	1	2021	
California	1	1959	
CCNY	1	1950	
DePaul	1	1945	
Georgetown	1	1984	
Illinois	1	1915	
LSU	1	1935	
Loyola	1	1963	
Marquette	1	1977	
Maryland	1	2002	
Montana State	1	1929	
Ohio State	1	1960	
Oregon	1	1939	
Purdue	1	1932	
Temple	1	1938	
UNLV	1	1990	
UTEP	1	1966	
Virginia	1	2019	
Wabash	1	1922	
Washburn	1	1925	
Washington State	1	1917	
West Virginia	1	1942	
Wisconsin	1	1941	
