= Don Shields =

American basketball player (1914–1993)

Personal information
- Born: September 19, 1914 Oklahoma, U.S.
- Died: March 30, 1993 (aged 78) Tulsa, Oklahoma, U.S.
- Listed height: 6 ft 5 in (1.96 m)

Career information
- College: Temple (1935–1938)
- Position: Forward

Career highlights
- NIT champion (1938); NIT Most Valuable Player (1938)

Don Shields (September 19, 1914 - March 30, 1993) was an American college basketball player for the Temple Owls men's basketball team. He was also a professional basketball player for the Phillips 66ers, and later became a head coach for the Tulsa Golden Hurricane men's basketball team, and an NCAA referee.

== College career ==
Shields was a college basketball player for the Temple Owls men's basketball team under coach James Usilton from 1935 to 1938. He was nicknamed the 'spectacular splinter', and in 1938 led the Owls to victory in the inaugural NIT (National Invitation Tournament) championship game. He was voted as the 'most valuable player' of the tournament, and in 1969 was inducted into the Temple basketball Hall of Fame. During his tenure, Shields achieved All-American honors in 35-36', and again in 37-38', and his Owls compiled a record of 58-14.

== Professional career ==
=== Phillips 66ers ===
After college, Shields played with the Phillips 66ers (also known as the Phillips Oilers; from Bartlesville, Oklahoma) of the Amateur Athletic Union and the National Industrial Basketball League. His squad won the National AAU Championship in 1940 and 1942.

== Coaching career ==
=== Tulsa Golden Hurricanes ===
In 1945 through 1947, Don Shields coached the Tulsa Golden Hurricane men's basketball team.

=== Head coaching record ===
Record table
Season	Team	Overall	Conference	Standing	Postseason
Tulsa Golden Hurricane (Missouri Valley Conference) (1945–1947)
1945–46	Tulsa	6–12	3–9	7th	
1946–47	Tulsa	5–19	3–9	T–5th	
Tulsa:		11–31 (.262)			
Total:		11–31 (.262)			

== Later career ==
Shields later became a college basketball referee and officiated in an NCAA tournament Final four game. He was also the general manager at Mid-Continent Pipeline Co. (which would later be known as Sun Oil Co. and which eventually would become Sunoco.)

Don Shields died on March 30, 1993.
