= 1937–38 Washington Huskies men's basketball team =

American college basketball season

1937–38 Washington Huskies men's basketball
- Conference: Pacific Coast Conference
- Record: 29–7 (13–7 PCC)
- Head coach: Hec Edmundson (18th season)
- Captain: Ross Werner
- Home arena: UW Pavilion

1937–38 Pacific Coast Conference men's basketball standings
| | Conf. | | | | Overall |
| Team | W | | L | PCT | W | | L | PCT |
|---|---|---|---|---|---|---|---|---|
North
| Oregon | 14 | – | 6 | .700 | 25 | – | 8 | .758 |
| Washington | 13 | – | 7 | .650 | 29 | – | 7 | .806 |
| Washington State | 12 | – | 8 | .600 | 19 | – | 11 | .633 |
| Idaho | 12 | – | 8 | .600 | 24 | – | 11 | .686 |
| Oregon State | 6 | – | 14 | .300 | 17 | – | 16 | .515 |
| Montana | 3 | – | 17 | .150 | 10 | – | 19 | .345 |
South
| Stanford † | 10 | – | 2 | .833 | 21 | – | 3 | .875 |
| California | 8 | – | 4 | .667 | 18 | – | 11 | .621 |
| USC | 6 | – | 6 | .500 | 17 | – | 9 | .654 |
| UCLA | 0 | – | 12 | .000 | 4 | – | 20 | .167 |
† Conference playoff series winner

The 1937–38 Washington Huskies men's basketball team represented the University of Washington for the 1937–38 NCAA college basketball season. Led by eighteenth-year head coach Hec Edmundson, the Huskies were members of the Pacific Coast Conference and played their home games on campus at the UW Pavilion in Seattle, Washington.

The Huskies were 22–7 overall in the regular season and 13–7 in conference play; second in the Northern division.

This was the final season without an NCAA tournament and the last for Montana in PCC basketball. Washington went on a postseason barnstorming trip to Hawaii; unchallenged in seven games, they finished with a 29–7 record.

This was the first year of the National Invitation Tournament, which included only six teams.
