= 1937–38 UCLA Bruins men's basketball team =

American college basketball season

1937–38 UCLA Bruins men's basketball
- Conference: Pacific Coast Conference
- South
- Record: 4–20 (0–12 PCC)
- Head coach: Caddy Works (17th season)
- Assistant coaches: Wilbur Johns; Silas Gibbs; Dick Linthicum

1937–38 Pacific Coast Conference men's basketball standings
	Conf.				Overall
Team	W		L	PCT	W		L	PCT
North
Oregon	14	–	6	.700	25	–	8	.758
Washington	13	–	7	.650	29	–	7	.806
Washington State	12	–	8	.600	19	–	11	.633
Idaho	12	–	8	.600	24	–	11	.686
Oregon State	6	–	14	.300	17	–	16	.515
Montana	3	–	17	.150	10	–	19	.345
South
Stanford †	10	–	2	.833	21	–	3	.875
California	8	–	4	.667	18	–	11	.621
USC	6	–	6	.500	17	–	9	.654
UCLA	0	–	12	.000	4	–	20	.167
† Conference playoff series winner

The 1937–38 UCLA Bruins men's basketball team represented the University of California, Los Angeles during the 1937–38 NCAA men's basketball season and were members of the Pacific Coast Conference. The Bruins were led by 17th year head coach Caddy Works. They finished the regular season with a record of 4–20 and were fourth in the southern division with a record of 0–12.

== Previous season ==
The Bruins finished the regular season with a record of 6–14 and were fourth in the southern division with a record of 2–10.

== Roster ==
1937–38 UCLA Bruins men's basketball team
Players
Coaches

Pos.	#	Name	Height	Weight	Year	Hometown
	27	Bob Calkins	—	—
		Jack Cooper (C)	—	—	Sr
F	34	Crossan Hays	—	—	Jr
		Harry Holt	—	—
	28	Harley Humes	—	—
		Chet Lappen	—	—
		Jack Montgomery	—	—
		Wilburn Munkers	—	—
		Alex Rafalovich	—	—
		Paul Slaughter	—	—
		Warren Thornberg	—	—

Head coach

Caddy Works

Assistant coach(es)

- Wilbur Johns (UCLA)
- Silas Gibbs (UCLA)
- Dick Linthicum (UCLA)

Legend

- (C) Team captain
- (S) Suspended
- (I) Ineligible
- (W) Walk-on
- Injured
- Current redshirt

Roster
Last update: 30 January 2018

== Schedule ==
Date time, TV	Rank^{#}	Opponent^{#}	Result	Record	Site city, state
Regular Season
*		Los Angeles Junior College	W 35–21	1–0	Men's Gym; Los Angeles, CA
*		La Verne	W 27–25	2–0	Men's Gym; Los Angeles, CA
*		Chico State	W 33–26	3–0	Men's Gym; Los Angeles, CA
		at Oregon State	L 25–39	3–1	Oregon State Coliseum; Corvallis, OR
		at Oregon	L 26–47	3–2	McArthur Court; Eugene, OR
		at Washington State	L 25–48	3–3	Bohler Gymnasium; Pullman, WA
		at Washington State	L 31–40	3–4	Bohler Gymnasium; Pullman, WA
		at Idaho	L 19–33	3–5	Memorial Gymnasium; Moscow, ID
		at Idaho	L 21–30	3–6	Memorial Gymnasium; Moscow, ID
*		Loyola Marymount	W 29–26	4–6	Men's Gym; Los Angeles, CA
*		Indiana	L 33–42	4–7	Men's Gym; Los Angeles, CA
*		Purdue	L 39–63	4–8	Men's Gym; Los Angeles, CA
		at USC	L 31–48	4–9 (0–1)	Shrine Auditorium; Los Angeles, CA
		California	L 37–39	4–10 (0–2)	Men's Gym; Los Angeles, CA
		California	L 27–32	4–11 (0–3)	Men's Gym; Los Angeles, CA
		USC	L 30–40	4–12 (0–4)	Men's Gym; Los Angeles, CA
		Stanford	L 33–69	4–13 (0–5)	Men's Gym; Los Angeles, CA
		Stanford	L 29–56	4–14 (0–6)	Men's Gym; Los Angeles, CA
		at Stanford	L 31–53	4–15 (0–7)	Stanford Pavilion; Stanford, CA
		at Stanford	L 33–50	4–16 (0–8)	Stanford Pavilion; Stanford, CA
		at California	L 21–32	4–17 (0–9)	Men's Gym; Berkeley, CA
		at California	L 22–41	4–18 (0–10)	Men's Gym; Berkeley, CA
		USC	L 33–52	4–19 (0–11)	Pan-Pacific Auditorium; Los Angeles, CA
		USC	L 35–57	4–20 (0–12)	Men's Gym; Los Angeles, CA
*Non-conference game. ^{#}Rankings from AP Poll. (#) Tournament seedings in parentheses. All times are in Pacific Time.
