= James Usilton =

American basketball coach (1895–1939)

Biographical details
- Born: June 10, 1895
- Died: March 13, 1939 (aged 43); Philadelphia, Pennsylvania, U.S.
- Education: Temple

Coaching career (HC unless noted)
- 1923?–1926: Central HS
- 1926–1939: Temple

Head coaching record
- Overall: 205–79 (.722)
- Tournaments: NIT: 3–0 (1.000)

Accomplishments and honors

Championships
- Helms National (1938); NIT (1938); 2× EIC (1937, 1938)

James A. Usilton Sr. (June 10, 1895 – March 13, 1939) was an American college basketball coach at Temple University between 1926–27 and 1938–39. He won 205 games as the Owls' coach, including one National Invitation Tournament (NIT) during the 1937–38 season. That Temple squad won the first-ever NIT. His 1937–38 team was also retroactively named the national champion by the Helms Athletic Foundation and was retroactively listed as the top team of the season by the Premo-Porretta Power Poll. His 1935–36 team reached the finals of the 1936 Olympic Trials.

== Head coaching record ==
Record table
Season	Team	Overall	Conference	Standing	Postseason
Temple Owls (Independent) (1926–1932)
1926–27	Temple	14–5			
1927–28	Temple	17–5			
1928–29	Temple	17–4			
1929–30	Temple	18–3			
1930–31	Temple	17–4			
1931–32	Temple	13–7			
Temple Owls (Eastern Intercollegiate Conference) (1932–1939)
1932–33	Temple	15–6	5–3	2nd	
1933–34	Temple	9–12	5–5	T–3rd	
1934–35	Temple	17–7	5–3	3rd	
1935–36	Temple	18–6	6–4	T–3rd	
1936–37	Temple	17–6	7–3	T–1st	
1937–38	Temple	23–2	9–1	1st	NIT Champions; Helms Foundation National Champions
1938–39	Temple	10–12	4–6	T–5th	
Temple:		205–79 (.722)	41–25 (.621)		
Total:		205–79 (.722)			
National champion Postseason invitational champion Conference regular season champion Conference regular season and conference tournament champion Division regular season champion Division regular season and conference tournament champion Conference tournament champion
