= Malcolm Musser =

American basketball coach

Personal information
- Born: July 11, 1889 Philadelphia, Pennsylvania, U.S.
- Died: August 11, 1969 (aged 80) Lewisburg, Pennsylvania, U.S.
- Listed height: 6 ft 1 in (1.85 m)
- Listed weight: 180 lb (82 kg)
- Coaching career: 1917–1942

Career history

Coaching
- 1917–1918: Bucknell
- 1919–1920: Bucknell
- 1925–1926: Bucknell
- 1932–1942: Bucknell

Malcolm Earl Musser (July 11, 1889 – August 11, 1969) was an American college basketball coach who coached for the Bucknell Bison for 13 years.

== Head coaching record ==
=== College ===
Record table
Season	Team	Overall	Conference	Standing	Postseason
Bucknell Bison (Independent) (1917–1918)
1917–18	Bucknell	11–3			
Bucknell Bison (Independent) (1919–1920)
1919–20	Bucknell	14–6			
Bucknell Bison (Independent) (1925–1926)
1925–26	Bucknell	8–4			
Bucknell Bison (Independent) (1932–1933)
1932–33	Bucknell	5–8			
Bucknell Bison (Eastern Intercollegiate Conference) (1933–1934)
1933–34	Bucknell	2–16	0–7	6th	
Bucknell Bison (Independent) (1934–1942)
1934–35	Bucknell	0–14			
1935–36	Bucknell	13–4			
1936–37	Bucknell	9–7			
1937–38	Bucknell	7–6			
1938–39	Bucknell	8–8			
1939–40	Bucknell	13–7			
1940–41	Bucknell	10–7			
1941–42	Bucknell	9–9			
Total:		110–99 (.526)			
