= 1937–38 Cincinnati Bearcats men's basketball team =

American college basketball season

1937–38 Cincinnati Bearcats men's basketball
- Conference: Buckeye Athletic Association
- Record: 6–11 ( Buckeye Athletic Association)
- Head coach: Rip Van Winkle (1st season)
- Captain: Robert Biedenbender
- Home arena: Schmidlapp Gymnasium

The 1937–38 Cincinnati Bearcats men's basketball team represented the University of Cincinnati during the 1937–38 NCAA men's basketball season. The head coach was Rip Van Winkle, coaching his first season with the Bearcats. The team finished with an overall record of 6–11.

== Schedule ==
Date time, TV	Opponent	Result	Record	Site city, state
December 8	at Georgetown (KY)	W 44–34	1–0	Schmidlapp Gymnasium; Cincinnati, OH
December 10	Wilmington	W 33–26	2–0	Schmidlapp Gymnasium; Cincinnati, OH
December 17	Mount Union	L 27–29	2–1	Schmidlapp Gymnasium; Cincinnati, OH
December 18	at Kentucky	L 21–38	2–2	Alumni Gymnasium; Lexington, KY
January 1	at Butler	L 25–38	2–3	Butler Fieldhouse; Indianapolis, IN
January 4	at Miami (OH)	W 36–34	3–3	Withrow Court; Oxford, OH
January 8	Ohio	W 42–37	4–3	Schmidlapp Gymnasium; Cincinnati, OH
January 14	Western Reserve	L 18–35	4–4	Schmidlapp Gymnasium; Cincinnati, OH
January 15	at Marshall	L 32–63	4–5	Huntington, WV
January 22	Dayton	L 30–32	4–6	Schmidlapp Gymnasium; Cincinnati, OH
January 29	at Ohio Wesleyan	W 39–27	5–6	Schmidlapp Gymnasium; Cincinnati, OH
February 1	at Ohio	L 35–40	5–7	Men's Gymnasium; Athens, OH
February 5	at Wittenberg	L 27–30	5–8	Springfield, OH
February 12	at Dayton	L 28–34	5–9	Montgomery County Fair Grounds Coliseum; Dayton, OH
February 18	Marshall	L 27–38	5–10	Schmidlapp Gymnasium; Cincinnati, OH
February 22	at Ohio Wesleyan	L 30–34	5–11	Delaware, OH
February 26	Miami (OH)	W 38–29	6–11	Schmidlapp Gymnasium; Cincinnati, OH
*Non-conference game. (#) Tournament seedings in parentheses.
