= Marshall Glenn =

American athlete, coach, and physician (1908–1983)

- Glenn pictured in The Monticola 1939, West Virginia yearbook

Biographical details
- Born: April 22, 1908; Elkins, West Virginia, U.S.
- Died: October 11, 1983 (aged 75); Hagerstown, Maryland, U.S.

Playing career

Football
- 1927–1929: West Virginia

Basketball
- 1927–1930: West Virginia
- Position: Quarterback (football)

Coaching career (HC unless noted)

Football
- 1937–1939: West Virginia

Basketball
- 1933–1938: West Virginia

Head coaching record
- Overall: 14–12–3 (football); 61–46 (basketball)
- Bowls: 1–0

Marshall "Little Sleepy" Glenn (April 22, 1908 – October 11, 1983) was a player and coach of American football and basketball and a medical doctor. He served as the head football coach at West Virginia University from 1937 to 1939, compiling a record of 14–12–3, and the school's head basketball coach from 1933 to 1938, tallying a mark of 61–46. Glenn was born on April 22, 1908, in Elkins, West Virginia. He died on October 11, 1983, at Washington Country Hospital in Hagerstown, Maryland, from injuries sustained in a car accident on U.S. Route 340. While attending West Virginia University he was a member of Sigma Phi Epsilon.

== Head coaching record ==
=== Football ===
Year	Team	Overall	Conference	Standing	Bowl/playoffs
West Virginia Mountaineers (Independent) (1937–1939)
1937	West Virginia	8–1–1			W Sun
1938	West Virginia	4–5–1			
1939	West Virginia	2–6–1			
West Virginia:		14–12–3			
Total:		14–12–3			

=== Basketball ===
Record table
Season	Team	Overall	Conference	Standing	Postseason
West Virginia Mountaineers (Eastern Intercollegiate Conference) (1933–1938)
1933–34	West Virginia	14–5	7–3	2nd	
1934–35	West Virginia	16–6	6–2^{[Note A]}	T-1st^{[Note A]}	0–1^{[Note A]}
1935–36	West Virginia	16–8	6–4	T-3rd	
1936–37	West Virginia	9–14	3–7	T-5th	
1937–38	West Virginia	6–13	2–8	6th	
Total:		61–46 (.570)			

^A. In the 1934–35 season, West Virginia finished the Eastern Intercollegiate Conference season with a record of 6–2, tied for first place with Pittsburgh.West Virginia subsequently lost to Pittsburgh in a conference championship playoff game, not included in West Virginia's regular-season conference won-lost record.
