= 1937–38 Idaho Vandals men's basketball team =

American college basketball season

1937–38 Idaho Vandals men's basketball
- Conference: Pacific Coast Conference
- Record: 24–11 (12–8 PCC)
- Head coach: Forrest Twogood (2nd season)
- Home arena: Memorial Gymnasium

1937–38 Pacific Coast Conference men's basketball standings
	Conf.				Overall
Team	W		L	PCT	W		L	PCT
North
Oregon	14	–	6	.700	25	–	8	.758
Washington	13	–	7	.650	29	–	7	.806
Washington State	12	–	8	.600	19	–	11	.633
Idaho	12	–	8	.600	24	–	11	.686
Oregon State	6	–	14	.300	17	–	16	.515
Montana	3	–	17	.150	10	–	19	.345
South
Stanford †	10	–	2	.833	21	–	3	.875
California	8	–	4	.667	18	–	11	.621
USC	6	–	6	.500	17	–	9	.654
UCLA	0	–	12	.000	4	–	20	.167
† Conference playoff series winner

The 1937–38 Idaho Vandals men's basketball team represented the University of Idaho during the 1937–38 NCAA college basketball season. Members of the Pacific Coast Conference, the Vandals were led by second-year head coach Forrest Twogood and played their home games on campus at Memorial Gymnasium in Moscow, Idaho.

The Vandals were 24–11 overall and 12–8 in conference play.

Notable players were dual-sport stars Steve Belko and Lyle Smith, both future coaches and administrators.
