= 1937–38 Washington State Cougars men's basketball team =

American college basketball season

1937–38 Washington State Cougars men's basketball
- Conference: Pacific Coast Conference
- Record: 19–11 (12–8 PCC)
- Head coach: Jack Friel (10th season)
- Home arena: WSC Gymnasium

1937–38 Pacific Coast Conference men's basketball standings
	Conf.				Overall
Team	W		L	PCT	W		L	PCT
North
Oregon	14	–	6	.700	25	–	8	.758
Washington	13	–	7	.650	29	–	7	.806
Washington State	12	–	8	.600	19	–	11	.633
Idaho	12	–	8	.600	24	–	11	.686
Oregon State	6	–	14	.300	17	–	16	.515
Montana	3	–	17	.150	10	–	19	.345
South
Stanford †	10	–	2	.833	21	–	3	.875
California	8	–	4	.667	18	–	11	.621
USC	6	–	6	.500	17	–	9	.654
UCLA	0	–	12	.000	4	–	20	.167
† Conference playoff series winner

The 1937–38 Washington State Cougars men's basketball team represented Washington State College for the 1937–38 college basketball season. Led by tenth-year head coach Jack Friel, the Cougars were members of the Pacific Coast Conference and played their home games on campus at WSC Gymnasium in Pullman, Washington.

The Cougars were 19–11 overall in the regular season and 12–8 in conference play, tied for third place in the Northern division.
