= Eastern Intercollegiate Conference =

- Association: NCAA
- Founded: 1932
- Folded: 1939
- Sports fielded: College basketball
- Division: Division I (post-1973 equivalent)
- No. of teams: 5 (1932-33 and 1934-35); 6 (1933-34; 1935-36 through 1938-39)

Locations
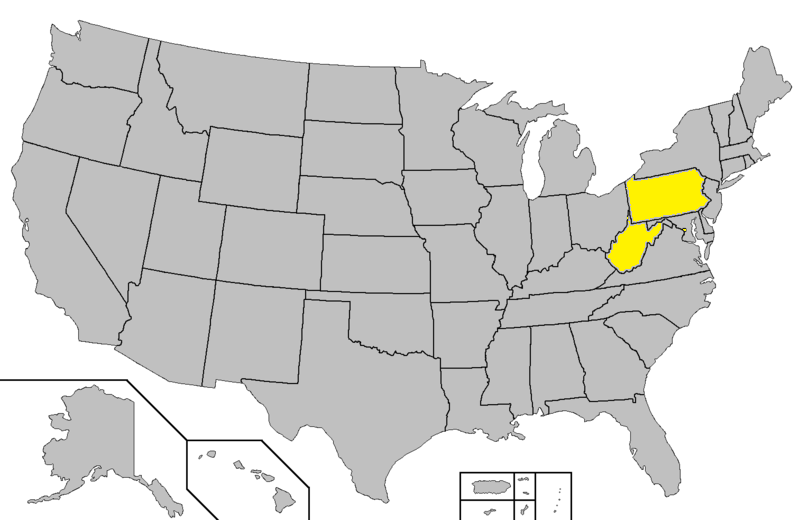

The Eastern Intercollegiate Conference (EIC) was an athletic conference in the National Collegiate Athletic Association in the United States. The conference sponsored men's college basketball and existed from 1932 to 1939, with teams in the District of Columbia, Pennsylvania, and West Virginia.

The 1937–1938 conference champion, Temple, went on to win the 1938 National Invitation Tournament.

Although the Associated Press described the conference as "one of the best in the nation," its members agreed to disband it at the end of the 1938–1939 season because geographical problems had made scheduling difficult.

== Member schools ==
Over its seven seasons of existence, the conference's membership varied between five and six schools each season.

=== Final members ===
| Institution | Location | Founded | Affiliation | Enrollment | Nickname | Joined (Note: Represents the calendar year when fall sports competition begins.) | Left (Note: Represents the calendar year when spring sports competition ends.) | Current conference |
|---|---|---|---|---|---|---|---|---|
| Carnegie Institute of Technology | Pittsburgh, Pennsylvania | 1900 | Nonsectarian | 10,875 | Tartans | 1932 | 1939 | University (UAA) (Note: Currently an NCAA Division III athletic conference.) |
| Georgetown University | Washington, D.C. | 1789 | Catholic (Jesuit) | 19,371 | Hoyas | 1932 | 1939 | Big East (Note: Currently an NCAA Division I athletic conference.) |
| Pennsylvania State University | State College, Pennsylvania | 1855 | Public | 45,901 | Nittany Lions | 1935 | 1939 | Big Ten (B1G) |
| University of Pittsburgh | Pittsburgh, Pennsylvania | 1787 | Public | 28,664 | Panthers | 1932 | 1939 | Atlantic Coast (ACC) |
| Temple University | Philadelphia, Pennsylvania | 1884 | State related | 39,755 | Owls | 1932 | 1939 | The American |
| West Virginia University | Morgantown, West Virginia | 1867 | Public | 26,839 | Mountaineers | 1932 | 1939 | Big 12 |

=== Other members ===
| Institution | Location | Founded | Affiliation | Enrollment | Nickname | Joined (Note: Represents the calendar year when fall sports competition begins.) | Left (Note: Represents the calendar year when spring sports competition ends.) | Current conference |
|---|---|---|---|---|---|---|---|---|
| Bucknell University | Lewisburg, Pennsylvania | 1846 | Nonsectarian | 3,650 | Bison | 1933 | 1934 | Patriot (Note: Currently an NCAA Division I athletic conference.) |

=== Membership timeline ===
Member Non-member

== Champions ==
The conference championships were determined by the best regular season conference records except in the event of teams having identical conference records. In the case of such ties, the conference championship was decided by a one-game playoff championship game at the conclusion of the regular conference season. Conference championships were decided by this playoff game in 1935, 1936, and 1937. However, following the 1938–1939 season, no playoff game was held despite identical records held by Carnegie Tech and Georgetown, and the two schools were declared co-champions for the season.

Pittsburgh dominated the conference results with four championships in the conference's seven seasons, winning the first two seasons by having the best regular-season record and winning championship playoff games in 1935 and 1937, but losing the 1936 championship playoff game.

- 1932–1933 Pittsburgh
- 1933–1934 Pittsburgh
- 1934–1935 Pittsburgh*
- 1935–1936 Carnegie Tech*
- 1936–1937 Pittsburgh*
- 1937–1938 Temple
- 1938–1939 Carnegie Tech/Georgetown**

* Conference title decided by a playoff game
** No playoff game held. The two teams were declared co-champions based on identical regular-season conference records.

== Scoring record ==
During the 1937–1938 season, Carnegie Tech′s Melvin Cratsley set the league′s single-game scoring record in men's basketball with 34 points against West Virginia. He scored 12 field goals during the game, ten of them on tip-ins or by shooting from directly beneath the hoop and the other two on set shots from inside the free throw line.

== Season standings ==
Each team played each other team in the conference twice each season in a home-and-home schedule except for the 1933–1934 season, when Bucknell, Carnegie Tech, and Pittsburgh did not play a complete 10-game home-and-home schedule for the season.

=== 1932–1933 ===
| 1932-33 | Conference | | | Overall | |
| 1932-33 | W-L | Pct. | GB | W-L | Pct. |
|---|---|---|---|---|---|
| Pittsburgh | 7–1 | .875 | – | 17–5 | .773 |
| Temple | 5–3 | .625 | 2 | 15–6 | .714 |
| Carnegie Tech | 4–4 | .500 | 3 | 4–5 | .444 |
| Georgetown | 3–5 | .375 | 4 | 6–11 | .353 |
| West Virginia | 1–7 | .125 | 6 | 10–14 | .417 |

=== 1933–1934 ===
| 1933-34 | Conference | | | Overall | |
| 1933-34 | W-L | Pct. | GB | W-L | Pct. |
|---|---|---|---|---|---|
| Pittsburgh | 8–0 | 1.000 | – | 18–4 | .818 |
| West Virginia | 7–3 | .700 | 2 | 14–5 | .737 |
| Georgetown | 5–5 | .500 | 4 | 12–11 | .522 |
| Temple | 5–5 | .500 | 4 | 9–12 | .429 |
| Carnegie Tech | 2–7 | .222 | 6½ | 1–8 | .111 |
| Bucknell | 0–7 | .000 | 7½ | 2–16 | .111 |

=== 1934–1935 ===
| 1934-35 | Conference | | | Overall | |
| 1934-35 | W-L | Pct. | GB | W-L | Pct. |
|---|---|---|---|---|---|
| Pittsburgh* | 6–2 | .750 | – | 18–6 | .750 |
| West Virginia* | 6–2 | .750 | – | 16–6 | .727 |
| Temple | 5–3 | .625 | 1 | 17–7 | .708 |
| Carnegie Tech | 2–6 | .250 | 4 | 3–6 | .333 |
| Georgetown | 1–7 | .125 | 5 | 6–13 | .316 |

*Conference playoff championship game, March 18, 1935, in Morgantown, West Virginia.
Pittsburgh 35, West Virginia 22

=== 1935–1936 ===
| 1935-36 | Conference | | | Overall | |
| 1935-36 | W-L | Pct. | GB | W-L | Pct. |
|---|---|---|---|---|---|
| Carnegie Tech* | 7–3 | .700 | – | 8–3 | .727 |
| Pittsburgh* | 7–3 | .700 | – | 18–9 | .667 |
| Temple | 6–4 | .600 | 1 | 18–6 | .750 |
| West Virginia | 6–4 | .600 | 1 | 16–8 | .667 |
| Georgetown | 4–6 | .400 | 3 | 7–11 | .389 |
| Penn State | 0–10 | .000 | 7 | 6–11 | .353 |

*Conference playoff championship game, March 14, 1936, at Pitt Stadium Pavilion, Pittsburgh, Pennsylvania.
Carnegie Tech 32, Pittsburgh 27

=== 1936–1937 ===
| 1936-37 | Conference | | | Overall | |
| 1936-37 | W-L | Pct. | GB | W-L | Pct. |
|---|---|---|---|---|---|
| Temple* | 7–3 | .700 | – | 17–6 | .739 |
| Pittsburgh* | 7–3 | .700 | – | 14–7 | .667 |
| Penn State | 6–4 | .600 | 1 | 10–7 | .588 |
| Carnegie Tech | 4–6 | .400 | 3 | 9–11 | .450 |
| Georgetown | 3–7 | .300 | 4 | 9–8 | .529 |
| West Virginia | 3–7 | .300 | 4 | 9–14 | .391 |

*Conference playoff championship game, March 22, 1937, at Philadelphia Arena, Philadelphia, Pennsylvania.
Pittsburgh 35, Temple 29

=== 1937–1938 ===
| 1937-38 | Conference | | | Overall | |
| 1937-38 | W-L | Pct. | GB | W-L | Pct. |
|---|---|---|---|---|---|
| Temple | 9–1 | .900 | – | 23–2 | .920 |
| Penn State | 6–4 | .600 | 3 | 13–5 | .722 |
| Pittsburgh | 5–5 | .500 | 4 | 9–12 | .429 |
| Georgetown | 5–5 | .500 | 4 | 7–11 | .389 |
| Carnegie Tech | 3–7 | .300 | 6 | 3–7 | .300 |
| West Virginia | 2–8 | .200 | 7 | 6–13 | .316 |

=== 1938–1939 ===
| 1938-39 | Conference | | | Overall | |
| 1938-39 | W-L | Pct. | GB | W-L | Pct. |
|---|---|---|---|---|---|
| Carnegie Tech* | 6–4 | .600 | – | 12–7 | .632 |
| Georgetown* | 6–4 | .600 | – | 13–9 | .591 |
| Penn State | 5–5 | .500 | 1 | 13–10 | .565 |
| Pittsburgh | 5–5 | .500 | 1 | 10–8 | .556 |
| West Virginia | 4–6 | .400 | 2 | 10–9 | .526 |
| Temple | 4–6 | .400 | 2 | 10–12 | .455 |

*No conference championship playoff game was held, so Carnegie Tech and Georgetown finished as co-champions.

== Overall team results ==
Eastern Intercollegiate Conference Team Results during conference membership
| Team | Sea- sons | Years | EIC Record* | EIC Winning Pct. | EIC Champion- ships | Overall Record | Overall Winning Pct. | Postseason** |
| Bucknell | 1 | 1933–1934 | 0–7 | .000 | 0 | 2–16 | .111 | N/A |
| Carnegie Tech | 7 | 1932–1939 | 29–37 | .439 | 2*** | 40–47 | .460 | 1–0 in EIC playoff games |
| Georgetown | 7 | 1932–1939 | 27–39 | .409 | 1*** | 60–74 | .448 | none |
| Penn State | 4 | 1935–1939 | 17–23 | .425 | 0 | 42–33 | .560 | none |
| Pittsburgh | 7 | 1932–1939 | 47–20 | .701 | 4 | 104–51 | .671 | 2–1 in EIC playoff games |
| Temple | 7 | 1932–1939 | 41–26 | .612 | 1 | 109–51 | .681 | 0–1 in EIC playoff games; Won 1938 NIT |
| West Virginia | 7 | 1932–1939 | 29–38 | .433 | 0 | 81–69 | .540 | 0–1 in EIC playoff games |
| Totals | 7 | 1932–1939 | — | — | — | 438–341 | .562 | One NIT championship |

*Includes conference playoff games.
**The National Invitation Tournament did not begin play until 1938. The NCAA tournament did not begin play until 1939. "N/A" (not applicable) indicates neither tournament existed during the school's membership in the conference.
***Includes a conference co-championship Carnegie Tech and Georgetown shared in the 1938–1939 season.

== Head coaches ==
Eleven men served as head coaches of EIC teams during the conference's seven seasons of play. Only three of them — Pittsburgh's Doc Carlson, Carnegie Tech's Max E. Hannum, and Temple's James Usilton — coached their teams throughout the EIC's existence.

Eastern Intercollegiate Conference Head Coaches during Eastern Intercollegiate Conference membership
| Coach | Team | Sea- sons | Years | Confer- ence Record* | EIC Winning Pct. | EIC Champion- ships | Overall Record | Overall Winning Pct. | Postseason** |
| Doc Carlson | Pittsburgh | 7 | 1932–1939 | 47–20 | .701 | 4 | 104–51 | .671 | 2–1 in EIC playoff games |
| Marshall Glenn | West Virginia | 5 | 1933–1938 | 24–25 | .490 | 0 | 61–46 | .570 | 0–1 in EIC playoff games |
| Max E. Hannum | Carnegie Tech | 7 | 1932–1939 | 29–37 | .439 | 2*** | 40–47 | .460 | 1–0 in EIC playoff games |
| John Lawther | Penn State | 3 | 1936–1939 | 17–13 | .567 | 0 | 36–22 | .621 | none |
| Earl Leslie | Penn State | 1 | 1935–1936 | 0–10 | .000 | 0 | 6–11 | .353 | N/A |
| Fred Mesmer | Georgetown | 6 | 1932–1938 | 21–35 | .375 | 0 | 47–65 | .420 | none |
| Malcolm Musser | Bucknell | 1 | 1933–1934 | 0–7 | .000 | 0 | 2–16 | .111 | N/A |
| Dyke Raese | West Virginia | 1 | 1938–1939 | 4–6 | .400 | 0 | 10–9 | .526 | none |
| Elmer Ripley | Georgetown | 1 | 1938–1939 | 6–4 | .600 | 1*** | 13–9 | .591 | none |
| Francis Stadsvold | West Virginia | 1 | 1932–1933 | 1–7 | .125 | 0 | 10–14 | .417 | N/A |
| James Usilton | Temple | 7 | 1932–1939 | 41–26 | .612 | 1 | 109–51 | .681 | 0–1 in EIC playoff games; Won 1938 NIT |

*Includes conference playoff games.
**The National Invitation Tournament did not begin play until 1938. The NCAA tournament did not begin play until 1939. "N/A" (not applicable) indicates coaching tenures in the conference during which neither tournament existed.
***Includes a conference co-championship Carnegie Tech and Georgetown shared in the 1938–1939 season.
