= 1937–38 La Salle Explorers men's basketball team =

American college basketball season

1937–38 La Salle Explorers men's basketball
- Conference: Independent
- Record: 13–6
- Head coach: Leonard Tanseer (5th season)
- Captain: Frank Hoerst
- Home arena: Wister Hall

The 1937–38 La Salle Explorers men's basketball team represented La Salle University during the 1937–38 NCAA men's basketball season. The head coach was Leonard Tanseer, coaching the explorers in his fifth season. The team finished with an overall record of 13–6.
