= Temple Owls men's basketball =

Men's basketball team of Temple University

Temple Owls
2026–27 Temple Owls men's basketball team
- University: Temple University
- Head coach: Adam Fisher (4th season)
- Location: Philadelphia, Pennsylvania
- Arena: Liacouras Center (Capacity: 10,206)
- Conference: The American
- Nickname: Owls
- Colors: Cherry and white
- All-time record: 2,010–1,172 (.632)

NCAA Division I tournament third place
- 1956, 1958
Other NCAA Division I tournament results
Final Four	1956, 1958
Elite Eight	1944, 1956, 1958, 1988, 1991, 1993, 1999, 2001
Sweet Sixteen	1956, 1958, 1988, 1991, 1993, 1999, 2001
Appearances	1944, 1956, 1958, 1964, 1967, 1970, 1972, 1979, 1984, 1985, 1986, 1987, 1988, 1990, 1991, 1992, 1993, 1994, 1995, 1996, 1997, 1998, 1999, 2000, 2001, 2008, 2009, 2010, 2011, 2012, 2013, 2016, 2019

Pre-tournament Helms national champions
- 1937–38

NIT champions
- 1938, 1969

Conference tournament champions
- 1979, 1985, 1987, 1988, 1990, 2000, 2001, 2008, 2009, 2010

Conference regular-season champions
- 1937, 1938, 1964, 1967, 1969, 1972, 1977, 1979, 1982, 1984, 1987, 1988, 1990, 1998, 1999, 2000, 2010, 2012, 2016

Conference division champions
- 1998, 1999, 2000, 2002

Uniforms
Home	Away	Alternate

The Temple Owls men's basketball team represents Temple University in the sport of basketball. The Owls compete in National Collegiate Athletic Association (NCAA) Division I as a member of the American Conference (The American). They play their home games in the Liacouras Center on the university's main campus in Philadelphia, Pennsylvania, and are currently led by head coach Adam Fisher. Temple is the sixth-most winningest NCAA Division I men's college basketball program of all time, with 2,010 wins.

Temple won the inaugural National Invitation Tournament in 1938, and with it the national championship, in the season prior to the first NCAA tournament. They won the NIT again in 1969. Although Temple has competed in the NCAA tournament over thirty times, they are one of nine programs with that many appearances to have not won the tournament and one of four to have never reached the NCAA championship game. They recorded third-place NCAA finishes in 1956 and 1958.

On March 7, 2012, the Temple Owls announced that they would be rejoining the Big East Conference for all sports in 2013 after 31 years in the Atlantic 10 Conference, with the Owls football team membership beginning in the 2012 season. However, before Temple became an all-sports member of the Big East, the conference split along football lines. The league's non-FBS football schools formed a new Big East in 2013, while Temple and the remaining football members remained in the old conference, but renamed it the American Athletic Conference.

== History ==
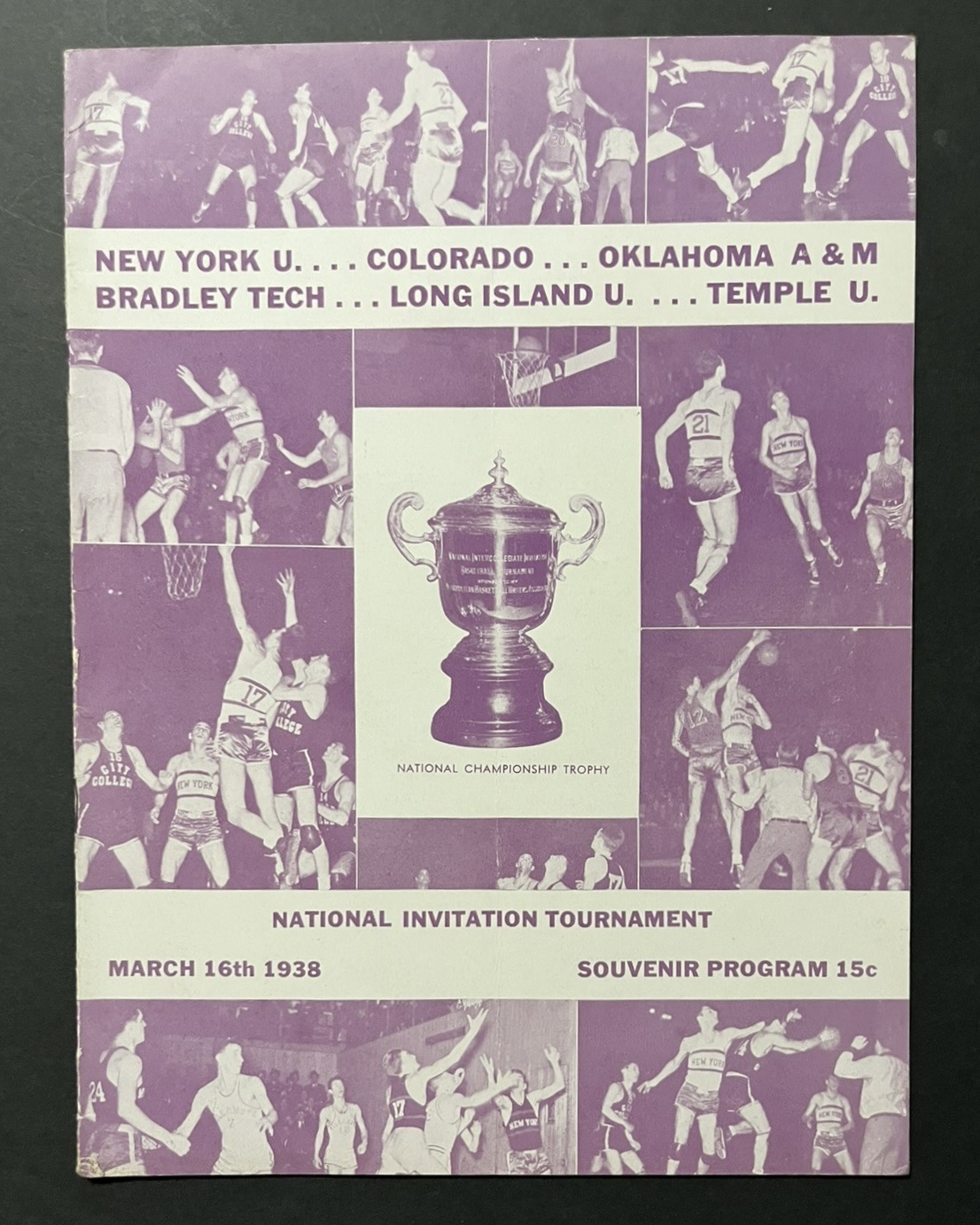
Souvenir program from the inaugural NIT showcasing the "National Championship Trophy" won by Temple in 1938

The Temple Owls became the first National Invitation Tournament (NIT) champions in 1938, one year before the inception of the NCAA tournament. The NIT was broadly recognized as a national championship-caliber tournament for a number of years, beginning with the 1938 national championship won by Temple. Additionally, the Owls were retroactively recognized by the Helms Athletic Foundation as the national champion for the 1937–38 season and were listed as the top team of that season by the Premo-Porretta Power Poll. Neither the Helms nor Premo-Porretta designations are recognized by the NCAA as official national championships, despite the NCAA referencing Helms's historical findings. Temple again won the NIT championship in 1969.

During the 1950s, the Temple basketball team made two NCAA Final Four appearances in (1956, 1958) under head coach Harry Litwack. Litwack was inducted into the Basketball Hall of Fame after concluding a 21-year coaching career that included 373 wins.

Head Coach John Chaney, also a Hall of Famer, won a total of 741 career games (312 losses) and took Temple to the NCAA tournament 17 times in 24 seasons with the Owls. His teams won the Atlantic 10 regular season championship eight times, while winning the A-10 Tournament six times. His 1987–88 Owls team entered the NCAA tournament ranked No. 1 in the country, but lost in the Elite Eight to Duke. Chaney reached the Elite Eight on five occasions and was the consensus National Coach of the Year in 1988. On March 13, 2006, Chaney retired from coaching.

On April 10, 2006, Penn head coach and La Salle alumnus Fran Dunphy was named the new head coach. Dunphy had coached the Quakers for 17 straight seasons prior to the move. After struggling his first year, the Owls won the A-10 tournament for three consecutive years in 2008, 2009, and 2010. The Owls received bids to the NCAA Tournament for six straight years under Dunphy (2008–2013). However, the Owls only won a game in the Tournament twice during that time period. Since Temple joined the American Conference in 2013, the Owls have struggled, making the NCAA Tournament only in 2016 and 2019.

After the 2018 season, it was announced that former Owls standout and then-assistant coach Aaron McKie would take over for Dunphy in 2019.

Players Mark Macon, Juan Ignacio Sanchez, Eddie Jones, Lavoy Allen, Aaron McKie, Tim Perry and Mardy Collins are just a few who have gone on to play in the NBA.

== Rivalries ==
As a member of the Big 5, the five large colleges in Philadelphia, the Owls have long-standing rivalries with Villanova, Penn, Saint Joseph's, and La Salle. The Owls are tied with Villanova for the most Big 5 titles to date, with 27. However, while tied in overall titles, Villanova has more outright titles not shared by any other tying team. The Owls have not won an outright Big 5 title since the 2000–01 season. The Owls won their most recent Big 5 title in 2022–23, going 3–1 in Big 5 play and splitting the title with Villanova. During Big 5 games, the Temple student section unfurls long banners about the opposing team, which has been a Big 5 trademark for Temple.

Other rivals include UMass, UConn, and Cincinnati. Temple was in the American Athletic Conference with UConn and Cincinnati until their departures in 2020 and 2023, respectively. When Temple was in the A-10, head coach John Chaney had a personal rivalry with UMass head coach John Calipari.

== Awards and honors ==
=== Retired numbers ===
Temple Owls retired numbers
No.	Player	Pos.	Tenure	No. ret.	Ref.
5	Guy Rodgers	PG	1955–1958		
6	Hal Lear	PG	1953–1956	2012	
12	Mark Macon	SG, PG	1987–1991		
20	Bill Mlkvy	SF	1949–1952		

=== National awards ===
==== All Americans ====
- Mike Bloom – 1938
- Bill Mlkvy – 1951
- Guy Rodgers – 1957, 1958
- Bill Kennedy – 1960
- Terrence Stansbury – 1984
- Nate Blackwell – 1987
- Mark Macon – 1988
- Pepe Sanchez – 2000

==== National Coach of the Year ====
- John Chaney – 1987, 1988

=== Conference awards ===
==== Atlantic 10 Conference (1982–2013) ====
- Atlantic 10 Player of the Year
  - Terrence Stansbury – 1983–84
  - Granger Hall – 1984–85
  - Nate Blackwell – 1986–87
  - Tim Perry – 1987–88
  - Mark Macon – 1988–89
  - Aaron McKie – 1992–93
  - Eddie Jones – 1993–94
  - Marc Jackson – 1996–97
  - Pepe Sanchez – 1999–00
  - Khalif Wyatt – 2012–13
- Atlantic 10 Sixth Man of the Year
  - Quincy Wadley – 1998–99
  - Lynn Greer – 1999–00
  - Brian Polk – 2001–02
  - Ramone Moore – 2009–10
  - Khalif Wyatt – 2010–11
- Atlantic 10 Most Improved Player
  - Dionte Christmas – 2006–07
  - Scootie Randall – 2010–11
- Atlantic 10 Coach of the Year
  - John Chaney – 1983–84, 1984–85, 1986–87, 1987–88, 1999–00
  - Fran Dunphy – 2009–10, 2011–12

==== American Conference (2013–present) ====
- American Athletic Conference Most Improved Player
  - Nate Pierre-Louis – 2019
- American Athletic Conference Coach of the Year
  - Fran Dunphy – 2015, 2016

=== Naismith Memorial Basketball Hall of Fame ===
- Harry Litwack – 1976
- John Chaney – 2001
- Guy Rodgers – 2014

== Owls in pro basketball ==
=== NBA drafted players ===
Year	Round	Overall	Player	Team
2011	2	50	Lavoy Allen	Philadelphia 76ers
2006	1	29	Mardy Collins	New York Knicks
2000	2	48	Mark Karcher	Philadelphia 76ers
1997	2	37	Marc Jackson	Golden State Warriors
1994	1	10	Eddie Jones	Los Angeles Lakers
1994	1	17	Aaron McKie	Portland Trail Blazers
1991	1	8	Mark Macon	Denver Nuggets
1991	1	18	Duane Causwell	Sacramento Kings
1988	1	7	Tim Perry	Phoenix Suns
1987	2	27	Nate Blackwell	San Antonio Spurs
1985	4	78	Granger Hall	Phoenix Suns
1985	6	124	Charles Rayne	Phoenix Suns
1984	1	15	Terence Stansbury	Dallas Mavericks
1984	8	167	Jim McLoughlin	Los Angeles Clippers
1981	9	202	Ron Wister	Philadelphia 76ers
1979	4	81	Ricky Reed	Los Angeles Lakers
1978	9	181	Tim Claxton	Philadelphia 76ers
1974	5	87	Joe Newman	Detroit Pistons
1972	2	30	Ollie Johnson	Portland Trail Blazers
1969	2	23	John Baum	Chicago Bulls
1969	3	40	Eddie Mast	New York Knicks
1969	5	70	Joe Cromer	Philadelphia 76ers
1968	9	118	Clarence Brookins	Philadelphia 76ers
1968	15	187	John Baum	Los Angeles Lakers
1966	4	40	Jim Williams	Chicago Bulls
1960	2	15	Bill Kennedy	Philadelphia Warriors
1958			Guy Rodgers	Philadelphia Warriors
1958	7	52	Jay Norman	Philadelphia Warriors
1958	9	68	Tink Van Patton	Philadelphia Warriors
1956	1	7	Hal Lear	Philadelphia Warriors
1955	7		Al Didriksen	Philadelphia Warriors
1955	8		Harry Silcox	Philadelphia Warriors
1952			Bill Mlkvy	Philadelphia Warriors
1950	5		Ike Borsavage	Philadelphia Warriors

== Postseason ==
=== NCAA tournament results ===
The Owls have appeared in the NCAA tournament 33 times. Their combined record is 33–33.

Year	Seed	Round	Opponent	Result
1944		Elite Eight; Regional 3rd Place Game	Ohio State; Catholic	L 47–57; W 55–35
1956		First Round; Sweet Sixteen; Elite Eight; Final Four; National 3rd Place Game	Holy Cross; Connecticut; Canisius; Iowa; SMU	W 74–72; W 65–59; W 60–58; L 76–83; W 90–81
1958		Sweet Sixteen; Elite Eight; Final Four; National 3rd Place Game	Maryland; Dartmouth; Kentucky; Kansas State	W 71–67; W 69–50; L 60–61; W 67–57
1964		First Round	Connecticut	L 48–53
1967		First Round	St. John's	L 53–57
1970		First Round	South Carolina	L 51–53
1972		First Round	West Virginia	L 71–77
1979	No. 7	First Round	No. 10 St. John's	L 70–75
1984	No. 8	First Round; Second Round	No. 9 St. John's; No. 1 North Carolina	W 65–63; L 66–77
1985	No. 8	First Round; Second Round	No. 9 Virginia Tech; No. 1 Georgetown	W 60–57; L 46–63
1986	No. 9	First Round; Second Round	No. 8 Jacksonville; No. 1 Kansas	W 61–50 OT; L 43–65
1987	No. 2	First Round; Second Round	No. 15 Southern; No. 10 LSU	W 75–56; L 62–72
1988	No. 1	First Round; Second Round; Sweet Sixteen; Elite Eight	No. 16 Lehigh; No. 8 Georgetown; No. 13 Richmond; No. 2 Duke	W 87–73; W 74–53; W 69–47; L 53–63
1990	No. 11	First Round	No. 6 St. John's	L 65–81
1991	No. 10	First Round; Second Round; Sweet Sixteen; Elite Eight	No. 7 Purdue; No. 15 Richmond; No. 3 Oklahoma State; No. 1 North Carolina	W 80–63; W 77–64; W 72–63 OT; L 72–75
1992	No. 11	First Round	No. 6 Michigan	L 66–73
1993	No. 7	First Round; Second Round; Sweet Sixteen; Elite Eight	No. 10 Missouri; No. 15 Santa Clara; No. 3 Vanderbilt; No. 1 Michigan	W 75–61; W 68–57; W 67–59; L 72–77
1994	No. 4	First Round; Second Round	No. 13 Drexel; No. 5 Indiana	W 61–39; L 58–67
1995	No. 7	First Round	No. 10 Cincinnati	L 71–77
1996	No. 7	First Round; Second Round	No. 10 Oklahoma; No. 2 Cincinnati	W 61–43; L 65–78
1997	No. 9	First Round; Second Round	No. 8 Ole Miss; No. 1 Minnesota	W 62–40; L 57–76
1998	No. 7	First Round	No. 10 West Virginia	L 52–82
1999	No. 6	First Round; Second Round; Sweet Sixteen; Elite Eight	No. 11 Kent State; No. 3 Cincinnati; No. 10 Purdue; No. 1 Duke	W 61–54; W 64–54; W 77–55; L 64–85
2000	No. 2	First Round; Second Round	No. 15 Lafayette; No. 10 Seton Hall	W 73–47; L 65–67 OT
2001	No. 11	First Round; Second Round; Sweet Sixteen; Elite Eight	No. 6 Texas; No. 3 Florida; No. 7 Penn State; No. 1 Michigan State	W 79–65; W 75–54; W 84–72; L 62–69
2008	No. 12	First Round	No. 5 Michigan State	L 61–72
2009	No. 11	First Round	No. 6 Arizona State	L 57–66
2010	No. 5	First Round	No. 12 Cornell	L 65–78
2011	No. 7	First Round; Second Round	No. 10 Penn State; No. 2 San Diego State	W 66–64; L 64–71 2OT
2012	No. 5	First Round	No. 12 South Florida	L 44–58
2013	No. 9	First Round; Second Round	No. 8 NC State; No. 1 Indiana	W 76–72; L 52–58
2016	No. 10	First Round	No. 7 Iowa	L 70–72 OT
2019	No. 11	First Four	No. 11 Belmont	L 70–81

=== NIT results ===
The Owls have appeared in the National Invitation Tournament (NIT) 19 times. Their combined record is 23–17. They are two-time NIT champions (1938, 1969).

Year	Round	Opponent	Result
1938	Quarterfinals; Semifinals; Final	Bradley; Oklahoma A&M; Colorado	W 53–40; W 56–55; W 60–36
1957	Quarterfinals; Semifinals; 3rd Place Game	Dayton; Bradley; St. Bonaventure	W 77–66; L 66–77; W 67–50
1960	First Round	Dayton	L 51–72
1961	First Round; Quarterfinals	Army; Dayton	W 79–65; L 62–60
1962	First Round; Quarterfinals	Providence; Loyola–Chicago	W 80–78; L 64–75
1966	First Round; Quarterfinals	Virginia Tech; BYU	W 88–73; L 78–90
1968	First Round	Kansas	L 76–82
1969	First Round; Quarterfinals; Semifinals; Final	Florida; Saint Peter's; Tennessee; Boston College	W 82–66; W 94–78; W 63–58; W 89–76
1978	First Round	Texas	L 58–72
1981	First Round; Second Round	Clemson; West Virginia	W 90–82; L 76–77
1982	First Round	Georgia	L 60–73
1989	First Round	Richmond	L 56–70
2002	First Round; Second Round; Quarterfinals; Semifinals; 3rd Place Game	Fresno State; Louisville; Villanova; Memphis; Syracuse	W 81–75; W 65–62; W 63–57; L 77–79; W 65–64
2003	Opening Round; First Round; Second Round; Quarterfinals	Drexel; Boston College; Rhode Island; Minnesota	W 68–59; W 75–62; W 61–53; L 58–63
2004	First Round	Rutgers	L 71–76
2005	First Round	Virginia Tech	L 50–60
2006	Opening Round	Akron	L 73–80
2015	First Round; Second Round; Quarterfinals; Semifinals	Bucknell; George Washington; Louisiana Tech; Miami (FL)	W 73–67; W 90–77; W 77–59; L 57–60
2018	First Round	Penn State	L 57–63
