= 1938 National Invitation Tournament =

Annual NCAA basketball competition

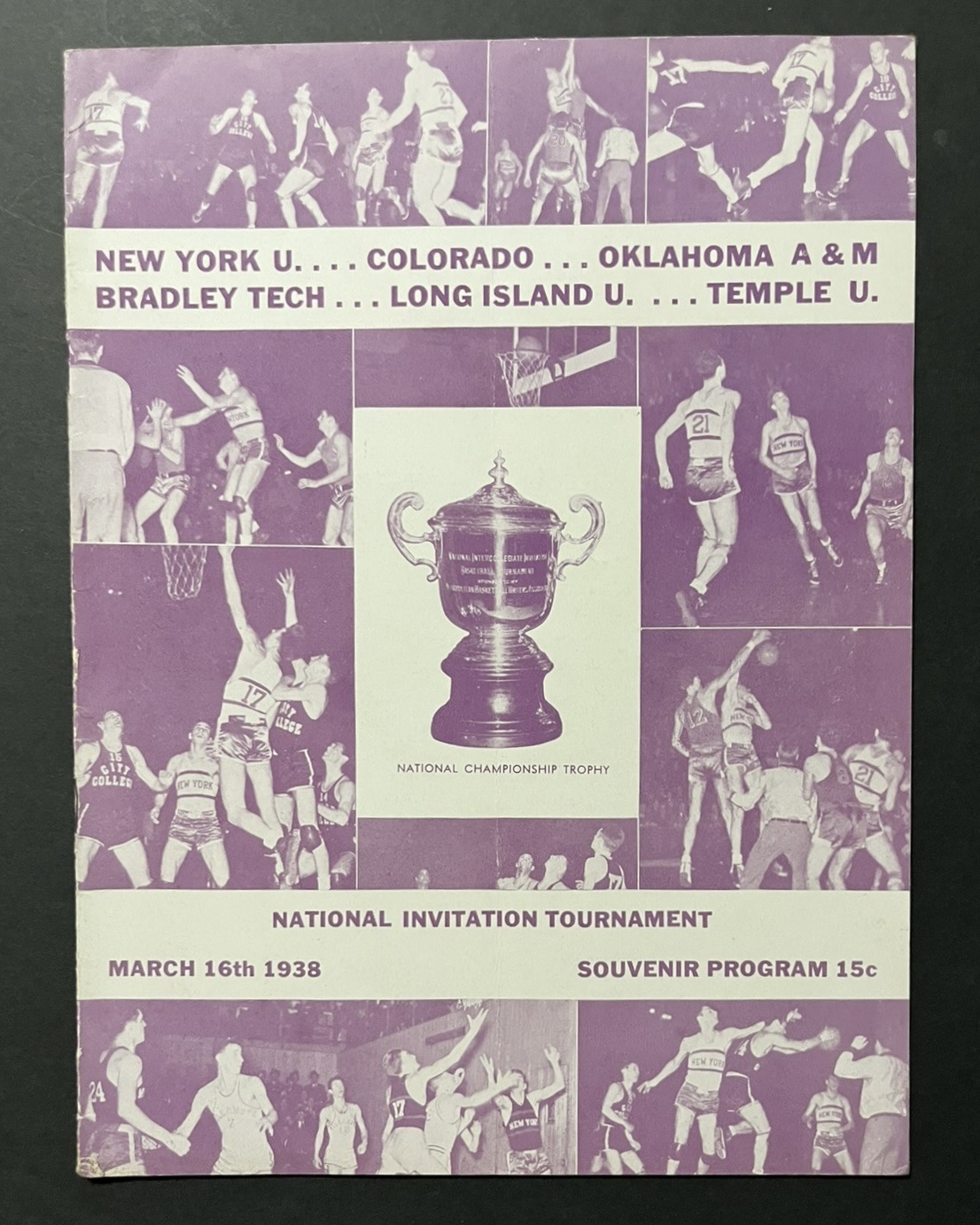
- Souvenir program from the tournament.

Tournament details
- City: New York City
- Venue: Madison Square Garden
- Dates: March 9–16, 1938
- Teams: 6

Final positions
- Champions: Temple Owls (1st title)
- Runners-up: Colorado Buffaloes
- Third place: Oklahoma A&M Aggies
- Fourth place: NYU Violets

Awards
- MVP: Don Shields (Temple)

The 1938 National Invitation Tournament was the inaugural edition of the annual college basketball competition.

The Invitation was won by Temple, who claimed the national championship with their win over Colorado in the tournament final.

== Selected teams ==
Below is a list of the six teams selected for the tournament.

Team	Conference	Overall record
Bradley	Illinois Intercollegiate Athletic Conference	18–1
Colorado	Mountain States Conference	14–5
Long Island	Metropolitan New York Conference	23–4
NYU	Metropolitan New York Conference	15–6
Oklahoma A&M	Missouri Valley Conference	24–2
Temple	Eastern Intercollegiate Conference	20–2

== Bracket ==
Below is the tournament bracket.

Opening round March 9
Temple	53
Bradley	40
NYU	39
Long Island	37

Semifinals; March 14
Oklahoma A&M	55
Temple	56
Colorado	48
NYU	47

Finals; March 16
Temple	60
Colorado	36
Third Place
Oklahoma A&M	37
NYU	24

== See also ==
- 1938 NAIA Basketball Tournament
