= 1936–37 NCAA men's basketball season =

Men's collegiate basketball season

- Helms National Champions: Stanford (retroactive selection in 1943)
- Player of the Year (Helms): Hank Luisetti, Stanford (retroactive selection in 1944)

The 1936–37 NCAA men's basketball season began in December 1936, progressed through the regular season and conference tournaments, and concluded in March 1937.

== Season headlines ==
- In February 1943, the Helms Athletic Foundation retroactively selected Stanford as its national champion for the 1936–37 season.
- In 1995, the Premo-Porretta Power Poll retroactively selected Stanford as its top-ranked team for the 1936–37 season.

== Conference membership changes ==
School	Former conference	New conference
The Citadel Bulldogs	Independent	Southern Conference
Davidson Wildcats	Independent	Southern Conference
Furman Paladins	Independent	Southern Conference
Richmond Spiders	Independent	Southern Conference
Wake Forest Demon Deacons	Independent	Southern Conference
William & Mary Indians	Independent	Southern Conference

== Regular season ==
=== Conferences ===
==== Conference winners and tournaments ====
Conference	Regular season winner	Conference player of the year	Conference tournament	Tournament venue (City)	Tournament winner
Big Six Conference	Kansas & Nebraska	None selected	No Tournament		
Big Ten Conference	Illinois & Minnesota	None selected	No Tournament		
Border Conference	New Mexico State	None selected	No Tournament		
Eastern Intercollegiate Basketball League	Penn	None selected	No Tournament		
Eastern Intercollegiate Conference	Pittsburgh & Temple	None selected	No Tournament; Pittsburgh defeated Temple in a single-game conference playoff		
Metropolitan New York Conference	Long Island	None selected	No Tournament		
Missouri Valley Conference	Oklahoma A&M	None selected	No Tournament		
Pacific Coast Conference	Washington State (North); Stanford (South)		No Tournament; Stanford defeated Washington State in best-of-three conference championship playoff series		
Rocky Mountain Athletic Conference	Colorado & Denver (Eastern); Montana State & Utah (Western)		No Tournament		
Southeastern Conference	Kentucky	None selected	1937 SEC men's basketball tournament	Alumni Memorial Gym (Knoxville, Tennessee)	Kentucky
Southern Conference	Washington and Lee	None selected	1937 Southern Conference men's basketball tournament	Thompson Gym (Raleigh, North Carolina)	Washington and Lee
Southwest Conference	SMU	None selected	No Tournament		

==== Conference standings ====
1936–37 Big Six Conference men's basketball standings
	Conf.				Overall
Team	W		L	PCT	W		L	PCT
Kansas	8	–	2	.800	15	–	4	.789
Nebraska	8	–	2	.800	13	–	7	.650
Oklahoma	7	–	3	.700	12	–	4	.750
Kansas State	5	–	5	.500	9	–	9	.500
Missouri	2	–	8	.200	7	–	9	.438
Iowa State	0	–	10	.000	3	–	15	.167

1936–37 Big Ten Conference men's basketball standings
	Conf.				Overall
Team	W		L	PCT	W		L	PCT
Illinois	10	–	2	.833	14	–	4	.778
Minnesota	10	–	2	.833	14	–	6	.700
Michigan	9	–	3	.750	16	–	4	.800
Purdue	8	–	4	.667	15	–	5	.750
Ohio State	7	–	5	.583	13	–	7	.650
Indiana	6	–	6	.500	13	–	7	.650
Northwestern	4	–	8	.333	11	–	9	.550
Iowa	3	–	9	.250	11	–	9	.550
Wisconsin	3	–	9	.250	8	–	12	.400
Chicago	0	–	12	.000	4	–	16	.200

1936–37 Border Conference men's basketball standings
	Conf.				Overall
Team	W		L	PCT	W		L	PCT
New Mexico A&M	15	–	3	.833	22	–	5	.815
Texas Tech	11	–	5	.688	18	–	7	.720
Arizona	9	–	7	.563	14	–	11	.560
New Mexico	10	–	10	.500	12	–	14	.462
Arizona State–Flagstaff	6	–	10	.375	11	–	13	.458
Arizona State–Tempe	7	–	11	.389	8	–	12	.400
Texas State M&M	0	–	10	.000	2	–	16	.111

1936–37 Eastern Intercollegiate Basketball League standings
	Conf.				Overall
Team	W		L	PCT	W		L	PCT
Penn	12	–	0	1.000	17	–	3	.850
Dartmouth	8	–	4	.667	14	–	8	.636
Columbia	7	–	5	.583	14	–	6	.700
Yale	7	–	5	.583	12	–	8	.600
Harvard	6	–	6	.500	10	–	8	.556
Princeton	2	–	10	.167	6	–	14	.300
Cornell	0	–	12	.000	3	–	14	.176

1936–37 Eastern Intercollegiate Conference men's basketball standings
	Conf.				Overall
Team	W		L	PCT	W		L	PCT
Temple	7	–	3	.700	17	–	6	.739
Pittsburgh†	7	–	3	.700	14	–	7	.667
Penn State	6	–	4	.600	10	–	7	.588
Carnegie Tech	4	–	6	.400	9	–	11	.450
Georgetown	3	–	7	.300	9	–	8	.529
West Virginia	3	–	7	.300	9	–	14	.391
† Postseason conference championship playoff game winner As of end of 1936-37 season

1936–37 Metropolitan New York Conference men's basketball standings
	Conf.				Overall
Team	W		L	PCT	W		L	PCT
LIU	2	–	0	1.000	28	–	3	.903
Fordham	5	–	1	.833	13	–	3	.813
Manhattan	5	–	2	.714	14	–	4	.778
NYU	4	–	2	.667	10	–	6	.625
CCNY	3	–	3	.500	10	–	6	.625
St. John's	1	–	4	.200	12	–	7	.632
St. Francis (NY)	1	–	5	.167	13	–	8	.619
Brooklyn	1	–	6	.143	11	–	8	.579

1936–37 Missouri Valley Conference men's basketball standings
	Conf.				Overall
Team	W		L	PCT	W		L	PCT
Oklahoma A&M	11	–	1	.917	20	–	3	.870
Creighton	8	–	4	.667	11	–	9	.550
Drake	7	–	5	.583	13	–	10	.565
Grinnell	7	–	5	.583	8	–	10	.444
Tulsa	4	–	8	.333	9	–	9	.500
Washington University	3	–	9	.250	6	–	12	.333
Washburn	2	–	10	.167	4	–	17	.190

1936–37 Pacific Coast Conference men's basketball standings
	Conf.				Overall
Team	W		L	PCT	W		L	PCT
North
Washington State	11	–	5	.688	24	–	8	.750
Oregon	11	–	5	.688	20	–	9	.690
Washington	11	–	5	.688	15	–	11	.577
Oregon State	5	–	11	.313	11	–	15	.423
Idaho	2	–	14	.125	8	–	19	.296
South
Stanford †	10	–	2	.833	25	–	2	.926
USC	8	–	4	.667	19	–	6	.760
California	4	–	8	.333	17	–	10	.630
UCLA	2	–	10	.167	6	–	13	.316
† Conference playoff series winner

1936–37 Rocky Mountain Conference men's basketball standings
	Conf.				Overall
Team	W		L	PCT	W		L	PCT
Eastern Division
Denver	11	–	2	.846	14	–	6	.700
Colorado	10	–	3	.769	10	–	5	.667
Western State (CO)	5	–	3	.625	10	–	7	.588
Colorado A&M	7	–	5	.583	7	–	6	.538
Colorado State–Greeley	8	–	6	.571	9	–	8	.529
Wyoming	7	–	7	.500	8	–	9	.471
Colorado College	3	–	11	.214	4	–	14	.222
Colorado Mines	0	–	14	.000	0	–	14	.000
Western Division
Montana State	8	–	5	.615	17	–	10	.630
Utah	7	–	6	.538	17	–	7	.708
BYU	5	–	7	.417	17	–	10	.630
Utah State	5	–	7	.417	6	–	9	.400

1936–37 Southeastern Conference men's basketball standings
	Conf.				Overall
Team	W		L	PCT	W		L	PCT
Georgia Tech	10	–	0	1.000	13	–	2	.867
Tennessee	7	–	1	.875	17	–	5	.773
Ole Miss	7	–	3	.700	20	–	6	.769
Auburn	7	–	4	.636	11	–	4	.733
Kentucky †	5	–	3	.625	17	–	5	.773
Georgia	5	–	3	.625	10	–	6	.625
LSU	7	–	6	.538	13	–	7	.650
Alabama	7	–	8	.467	11	–	10	.524
Mississippi State	6	–	7	.462	15	–	9	.625
Tulane	4	–	8	.333	6	–	8	.429
Vanderbilt	3	–	7	.300	6	–	10	.375
Florida	1	–	9	.100	5	–	13	.278
Sewanee	0	–	10	.000	1	–	15	.063
† Regular-season championship and SEC Tournament winner

1936–37 Southern Conference men's basketball standings
	Conf.				Overall
Team	W		L	PCT	W		L	PCT
Washington and Lee †	11	–	1	.917	17	–	4	.810
North Carolina	14	–	3	.824	18	–	5	.783
Wake Forest	9	–	4	.692	15	–	6	.714
North Carolina State	14	–	7	.667	15	–	9	.625
Duke	11	–	6	.647	15	–	8	.652
South Carolina	7	–	4	.636	13	–	7	.650
Richmond	5	–	4	.556	13	–	7	.650
Virginia	6	–	7	.462	9	–	10	.474
Furman	3	–	4	.429	8	–	7	.533
Davidson	5	–	8	.385	13	–	10	.565
Maryland	5	–	8	.385	8	–	12	.400
Virginia Tech	4	–	9	.308	6	–	11	.353
VMI	5	–	11	.313	6	–	11	.353
Clemson	2	–	7	.222	6	–	15	.286
The Citadel	0	–	5	.000	7	–	12	.368
William & Mary	0	–	13	.000	0	–	18	.000
† Southern Conference Tournament winner

1936–37 Southwest Conference men's basketball standings
	Conf.				Overall
Team	W		L	PCT	W		L	PCT
SMU	10	–	2	.833	13	–	8	.619
Arkansas	8	–	4	.667	12	–	6	.667
Rice	7	–	5	.583	6	–	10	.375
Baylor	6	–	6	.500	11	–	9	.550
Texas	5	–	7	.417	13	–	10	.565
Texas A&M	5	–	7	.417	12	–	13	.480
TCU	1	–	11	.083	1	–	13	.071

=== Major independents ===
A total of 52 college teams played as major independents. Western Kentucky State (21–2) had the best winning percentage (.913) and Marshall (23–8) finished with the most wins.

1936–37 NCAA men's basketball independents standings
	Conf.				Overall
Team	W		L	PCT	W		L	PCT
Western Kentucky State		–		–	21	–	2	.913
Notre Dame		–		–	20	–	3	.870
Rutgers		–		–	13	–	2	.867
Ohio		–		–	18	–	3	.857
Rhode Island State		–		–	18	–	3	.857
Central Missouri State		–		–	17	–	3	.850
Loyola (Ill.)		–		–	16	–	3	.842
Toledo		–		–	18	–	4	.818
George Washington		–		–	16	–	4	.800
Bradley		–		–	15	–	4	.789
St. Joseph's		–		–	15	–	4	.789
Syracuse		–		–	13	–	4	.765
Western State Teachers		–		–	13	–	4	.765
Marshall		–		–	23	–	8	.742
DePaul		–		–	15	–	6	.714
Detroit		–		–	11	–	5	.688
Duquesne		–		–	13	–	6	.684
Santa Clara		–		–	13	–	6	.684
Kent State		–		–	15	–	7	.682
Villanova		–		–	15	–	8	.652
Navy		–		–	9	–	5	.643
La Salle		–		–	12	–	7	.632
Connecticut		–		–	11	–	7	.611
Saint Mary's (Calif.)		–		–	14	–	9	.609
Boston University		–		–	9	–	6	.600
Colgate		–		–	9	–	6	.600
San Francisco		–		–	10	–	7	.588
Bucknell		–		–	9	–	7	.563
Canisius		–		–	9	–	7	.563
Niagara		–		–	12	–	10	.545
Army		–		–	7	–	6	.538
Indiana State		–		–	7	–	6	.538
Montana		–		–	14	–	12	.538
Marquette		–		–	8	–	8	.500
Muhlenberg		–		–	9	–	9	.500
Valparaiso		–		–	9	–	9	.500
Xavier		–		–	7	–	7	.500
Cincinnati		–		–	9	–	10	.474
Wichita Municipal		–		–	9	–	12	.429
Dayton		–		–	7	–	12	.368
St. Bonaventure		–		–	4	–	7	.364
Lehigh		–		–	5	–	10	.333
Louisville		–		–	4	–	8	.333
Seton Hall		–		–	5	–	10	.333
Lafayette		–		–	6	–	13	.316
Brown		–		–	5	–	11	.313
Miami (Ohio)		–		–	5	–	11	.313
Butler		–		–	6	–	14	.300
Michigan State Normal		–		–	5	–	12	.294
Saint Louis		–		–	6	–	15	.286
Bowling Green State		–		–	4	–	11	.267
Loyola (Md.)		–		–	4	–	12	.250

== Awards ==
=== Consensus All-American team ===
Consensus Team
Player	Class	Team
Jules Bender	Senior	Long Island
Hank Luisetti	Junior	Stanford
John Moir	Junior	Notre Dame
Paul Nowak	Junior	Notre Dame
Jewell Young	Junior	Purdue

=== Major player of the year awards ===
- Helms Player of the Year: Hank Luisetti, Stanford (retroactive selection in 1944)

=== Other major awards ===
- Haggerty Award (Top player in New York City metro area): Ben Kramer, Long Island

== Coaching changes ==
A number of teams changed coaches during the season and after it ended.

Team	Former Coach	Interim Coach	New Coach	Reason
Cincinnati	Tay Brown		Rip Van Winkle	
Colorado State	Sam Campbell		John S. Davis	
Davidson	Red Laird		Norman Shepard	
Florida	Josh Cody		Sam J. McAllister	
Lehigh	Glen Harmeson		Paul Cavert	
Loyola (Md.)	William Liston		Lefty Reitz	
Montana	Adolph J. Lewandowski		George Dahlberg	
Northern Colorado	John S. Davis		Jules Doubenmier	
TCU	Dutch Meyer		Mike Brumbelow	
Virginia Tech	William L. Younger		Herbert McEver	
VMI	Allison Hubert		Albert Elmore	
