= John Bunn (basketball) =

American basketball player and coach (1898–1979)

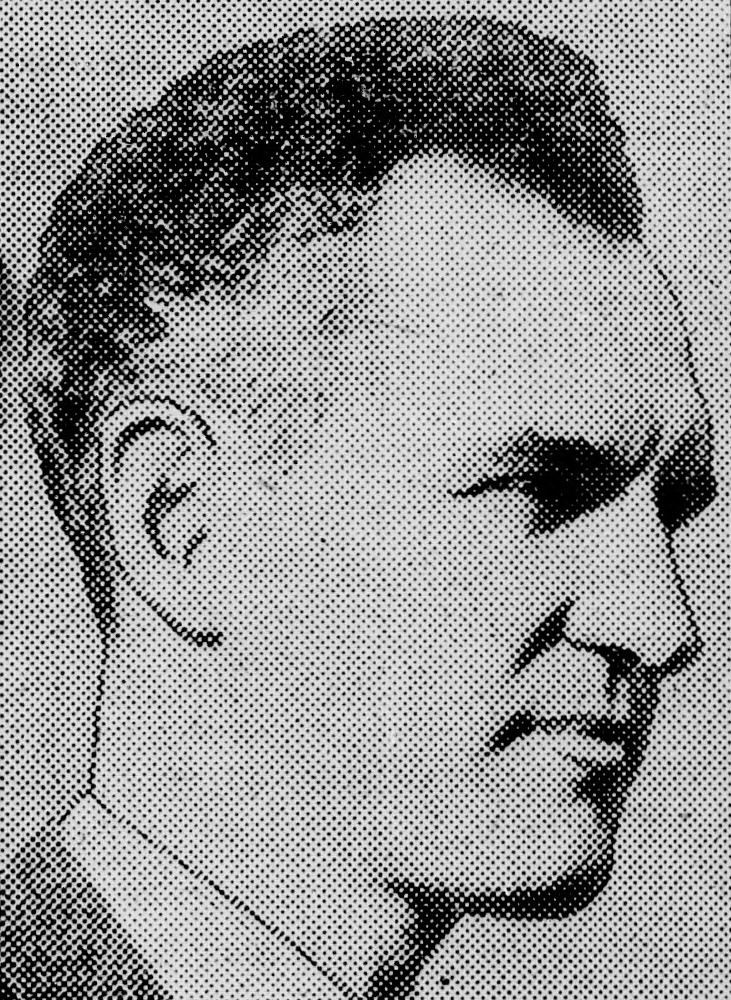
- Bunn, circa 1938

Biographical details
- Born: September 26, 1898
- Died: August 13, 1979 (aged 80); Newbury Park, California, U.S.

Playing career

Basketball
- 1917–1920: Kansas

Football
- 1917–1920: Kansas

Baseball
- c. 1920: Kansas
- Positions: Guard, forward (basketball); Halfback, quarterback (football)

Coaching career (HC unless noted)

Basketball
- 1921–1930: Kansas (assistant)
- 1930–1938: Stanford
- 1946–1956: Springfield
- 1956–1963: Colorado State–Greeley

Baseball
- 1926–1930: Kansas
- 1947: Springfield

Head coaching record
- Overall: 315–299 (basketball); 48–50 (baseball)

Accomplishments and honors

Championships
- Basketball; 1 Helms (1937)
- Basketball Hall of Fame; Inducted in 1964 (profile)
- College Basketball Hall of Fame; Inducted in 2006

John W. Bunn (September 26, 1898 – August 13, 1979) was an American basketball coach and key contributor to the game of basketball. The Wellston, Ohio native played three seasons at The University of Kansas, his senior season under returning head coach Phog Allen, while earning his bachelor's degree (1917–21). He later became an assistant to Allen for nine seasons (1921–30). In 1930 he became men's basketball head coach at Stanford University, where he coached college all-time great Hank Luisetti. His 1936–37 team finished the season with a 25–2 record, was retroactively named the national champion by the Helms Athletic Foundation, and was retroactively listed as the top team of the season by the Premo-Porretta Power Poll. After he left Stanford, Bunn went on to coach Springfield College (1946–56) and Colorado State College (now the University of Northern Colorado) (1956–63).

Bunn served as chairman of the Basketball Hall of Fame from 1949 to 1963. On October 1, 1964, Bunn was inducted to the Basketball Hall of Fame as a contributor. For his contribution, the Basketball Hall of Fame annually presents an award in his name.

Bunn died on August 13, 1979, in Newbury Park, California.

== Head coaching record ==
=== Basketball ===
Record table
Season	Team	Overall	Conference	Standing	Postseason
Stanford (PCC) (1930–1938)
1930–31	Stanford	8–9	3–6	4th (South)	
1931–32	Stanford	6–14	2–9	4th (South)	
1932–33	Stanford	9–18	3–8	3rd (South)	
1933–34	Stanford	8–12	5–7	3rd (South)	
1934–35	Stanford	10–17	4–8	T–3rd (South)	
1935–36	Stanford	21–8	7–5	T–1st (South)	
1936–37	Stanford	25–2	10–2	T–1st (South)	Helms National Champion
1937–38	Stanford	21–3	10–2	1st (South)	
Stanford:		108–83			
Springfield (Independent) (1946–1956)
1946–47	Springfield	15–8			
1947–48	Springfield	14–18			
1948–49	Springfield	14–9			
1949–50	Springfield	15–12			
1950–51	Springfield	13–16			
1951–52	Springfield	14–12			
1952–53	Springfield	19–12			
1953–54	Springfield	12–12			
1954–55	Springfield	15–11			
1955–56	Springfield	8–16			
Springfield:		139–126			
Colorado State–Greeley (RMFAC) (1956–1963)
1956–57	Colorado State–Greeley	11–10	5–5		
1957–58	Colorado State College	6–15	5–5		
1958–59	Colorado State College	14–10	12–6		
1959–60	Colorado State College	14–11	12–6		
1960–61	Colorado State College	8–16	7–7		
1961–62	Colorado State College	10–16	8–10		
1962–63	Colorado State College	10–16	8–8		
Colorado State–Greeley:		73–94			
Total:		315–299			
National champion Postseason invitational champion Conference regular season champion Conference regular season and conference tournament champion Division regular season champion Division regular season and conference tournament champion Conference tournament champion
