= 1937–38 Michigan Wolverines men's basketball team =

American college basketball season

1937–38 Michigan Wolverines men's basketball
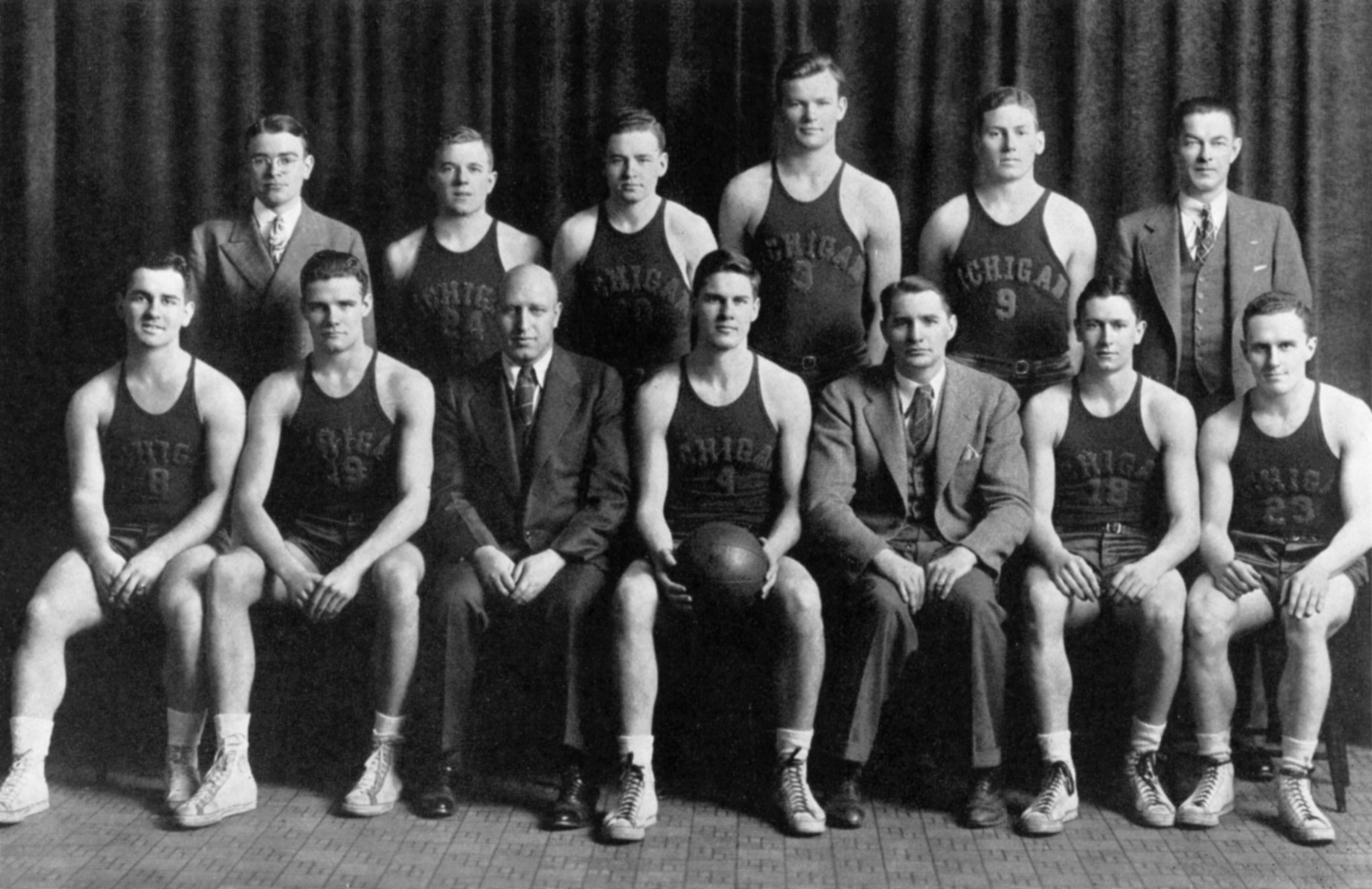
- Conference: Big Ten Conference
- Record: 12–8 (6–6 Big Ten)
- Head coach: Franklin Cappon
- Captain: John "Jake" Townsend
- Home arena: Yost Field House

1937–38 Big Ten Conference men's basketball standings
	Conf.				Overall
Team	W		L	PCT	W		L	PCT
Purdue	10	–	2	.833	18	–	2	.900
Minnesota	9	–	3	.750	16	–	4	.800
Ohio State	7	–	5	.583	12	–	8	.600
Northwestern	7	–	5	.583	10	–	10	.500
Michigan	6	–	6	.500	12	–	8	.600
Iowa	6	–	6	.500	11	–	9	.550
Wisconsin	5	–	7	.417	10	–	10	.500
Illinois	4	–	8	.333	9	–	9	.500
Indiana	4	–	8	.333	10	–	10	.500
Chicago	2	–	10	.167	6	–	12	.333

The 1937–38 Michigan Wolverines men's basketball team represented the University of Michigan in intercollegiate basketball during the 1937–38 season. The team scored 740 points in 20 games for an average of 37.0 points per game—the second highest point total and scoring per game in school history. Despite prolific scoring for the era, Michigan finished in a tie for fifth in the Big Ten Conference. The team compiled a 9–1 record in the first half of the season, including a six-game winning streak at the start of the season. However, the team went 3–7 in the second half of the season for a season record of 12–8, and 6–6 against Big Ten opponents.

One of the highlights of the season was a tour of the east during the winter break. Michigan played and defeated Maryland, Rochester, and a highly touted Dartmouth team on the trip. The Wolverines held Dartmouth to one point in the first half and led 21–1 at halftime. While the second half of the season was a disappointment, the Wolverines had scored their highest single game total in a 58–29 over Wisconsin on February 21, 1938.

Franklin "Cappy" Cappon was in his seventh and final year as the team's coach. Cappon had played basketball and football at Michigan from 1919 to 1923. As a senior, he was awarded the Western Conference Medal for all-around excellence in both athletics and academics. After seven seasons as Michigan's head coach, Cappon served as the head basketball coach from 1938 to 1961 at Princeton University, where he mentored Butch van Breda Kolff, Bill Bradley and Frank Deford. He compiled a combined record of 340–242 at Michigan and Princeton and was inducted into the Helms Foundation College Basketball Hall of Fame in 1957.

John "Jake" Townsend, a six-foot, four inch center from Indiana, was the team captain and leading scorer. Townsend was the team's leading scorer for three straight seasons. He scored 154 points during the 1935–36 season, 191 points during the 1936–37 season, and 226 points (81 field goals and 64 of 91 free throws) in 20 games as a senior during the 1937–38 season. Townsend 226 points during the 1937–38 season broke the school's single season scoring record of 181 points set by Arthur Karpus in the 1918–19 season. His career total of 571 points also broke Karpus's career scoring record of 338 points. Townsend was selected as a consensus All-American the end of the 1937–38 season. Townsend later played professional basketball in the National Basketball League for the Indianapolis Kautskys, Oshkosh All-Stars and Rochester Royals.

On March 8, 1938, the day after the season's final game, Coach Cappon announced that he had accepted the head coaching job at Princeton.

== Schedule ==
Date	Opponent	Score	Result	Location
December 11, 1937	Michigan State	43–40	Win	Yost Field House, Ann Arbor, MI
December 16, 1937	Akron	32–27	Win	Akron, OH
December 17, 1937	Maryland	43–26	Win	College Park, MD
December 20, 1937	Dartmouth	42–17	Win	White Plains, NY
December 21, 1937	Rochester	50–29	Win	Rochester, NY
January 1, 1938	Toledo	50–38	Win	Toledo, OH
January 3, 1938	Butler	38–35	Loss	Indianapolis, IN
January 8, 1938	Illinois	45–37	Win	Yost Field House, Ann Arbor, MI
January 10, 1938	Ohio State	38–28	Win	Yost Field House, Ann Arbor, MI
January 15, 1938	Minnesota	31–16	Win	Minneapolis, MN
January 17, 1938	Wisconsin	39–30	Loss	Madison, WI
January 22, 1938	Northwestern	30–29	Loss	Evanston, IL
January 24, 1938	Ohio State	29–26	Win	Columbus, OH
February 12, 1938	Michigan State	41–35	Loss	East Lansing, MI
February 14, 1938	Iowa	38–30	Loss	Yost Field House, Ann Arbor, MI
February 19, 1938	Minnesota	29–26	Loss	Yost Field House, Ann Arbor, MI
February 21, 1938	Wisconsin	58–29	Win	Yost Field House, Ann Arbor, MI
February 26, 1938	Iowa	37–25	Loss	Iowa City, IA
February 28, 1938	Illinois	36–32	Loss	Huff Hall, Urbana, IL
March 7, 1938	Northwestern	30–22	Win	Yost Field House, Ann Arbor, MI

== Scoring statistics ==
Player	Games	Field goals	Free throws	Points	Points per game
John "Jake" Townsend	20	81	64-91	226	11.3
James Rae	19	46	21-37	113	5.9
Leo Beebe	20	40	20-33	100	5.0
Herman Fishman	20	42	16-33	100	5.0
Edmund Thomas	19	33	9-17	75	3.9
Daniel Smick	19	18	17-35	53	2.8
Bill Barclay	9	17	4-15	38	4.2
Charles Pink	13	6	6-12	18	1.4
Manuel Slavin	13	5	0-1	10	0.8
Russell Dobson	11	2	0-1	4	0.4
Fred Trosko	4	1	0-0	2	0.5
Robert Palmer	3	0	1-1	1	0.3
Totals	20	301	158-276	740	37.0

== Coaching staff ==
- Franklin Cappon - coach
- Fielding H. Yost - athletic director
