= 1936–37 Iowa State Cyclones men's basketball team =

American college basketball season

1936–37 Iowa State Cyclones men's basketball
- Conference: Big Six Conference
- Record: 3–15 (0–10 Big Six)
- Head coach: Louis Menze (9th season)
- Assistant coach: Joseph Truskowski
- Home arena: State Gymnasium

1936–37 Big Six Conference men's basketball standings
	Conf.				Overall
Team	W		L	PCT	W		L	PCT
Kansas	8	–	2	.800	15	–	4	.789
Nebraska	8	–	2	.800	13	–	7	.650
Oklahoma	7	–	3	.700	12	–	4	.750
Kansas State	5	–	5	.500	9	–	9	.500
Missouri	2	–	8	.200	7	–	9	.438
Iowa State	0	–	10	.000	3	–	15	.167

The 1936–37 Iowa State Cyclones men's basketball team represented Iowa State University during the 1936–37 NCAA men's basketball season. The Cyclones were coached by Louis Menze, who was in his ninth season with the Cyclones. They played their home games at the State Gymnasium in Ames, Iowa.

They finished the season 3–15, 0–10 in Big Six play to finish in sixth place.

== Roster ==
1936–37 Iowa State Cyclones men's basketball team
Players
Coaches

Pos.	#	Name	Height	Weight	Year	Hometown
G		Don Atkinson	—	—
F		Bob Blahnik	—	—	Jr
F		Lavern Diekman	—	—
F		Jack Flemming (C)	—	—	Sr	Spirit Lake, Iowa
G		George Gibson	—	—
G		Chuck Heileman	—	190 lb (86 kg)
F		Maurice Johnson	—	—	Sr	LeGrand, Iowa
F		Bob Kliebenstein	—	—
G		Don Perkins	—	—
C		Fred Poole	—	—
F		Harry Roschlau	—	—
C		Burton Thomson	—	—	Sr

Head coach

- Louis Menze

Assistant coach(es)

Joseph Truskowski

Legend

- (C) Team captain
- (S) Suspended
- (I) Ineligible
- (W) Walk-on
- Injured
- Current redshirt

== Schedule and results ==
Date time, TV	Rank^{#}	Opponent^{#}	Result	Record	Site city, state
Regular season
December 4, 1936*		Central	W 37–30	1–0	State Gymnasium; Ames, Iowa
December 11, 1936*		Grinnell	W 39–26	2–0	State Gymnasium; Ames, Iowa
December 18, 1936*		Denver	L 31–36	2–1	State Gymnasium; Ames, Iowa
December 30, 1936*		Utah	W 40–27	3–1	State Gymnasium; Ames, Iowa
January 2, 1937*		at Minnesota	L 16–49	3–2	Williams Arena; Minneapolis, Minnesota
January 4, 1937*		at Creighton	L 28–33	3–3	University Gym; Omaha, Nebraska
January 9, 1937		Kansas State	L 31–44	3–4 (0–1)	State Gymnasium; Ames, Iowa
January 13, 1937		Missouri	L 28–31	3–5 (0–2)	State Gymnasium; Ames, Iowa
January 16, 1937		at Nebraska	L 33–45	3–6 (0–3)	Nebraska Coliseum; Lincoln, Nebraska
January 20, 1937		at Missouri	L 37–39	3–7 (0–4)	Brewer Fieldhouse; Columbia, Missouri
January 23, 1937*; 8:15 pm		at Drake; Iowa Big Four	L 20–35	3–8	Drake Fieldhouse; Des Moines, Iowa
January 30, 1937*		Drake; Iowa Big Four	L 32–36	3–9	State Gymnasium; Ames, Iowa
February 5, 1937		Kansas	L 26–36	3–10 (0–5)	State Gymnasium; Ames, Iowa
February 13, 1937		at Kansas	L 26–36	3–11 (0–6)	Hoch Auditorium; Lawrence, Kansas
February 15, 1937		at Oklahoma	L 22–28	3–12 (0–7)	OU Field House; Norman, Oklahoma
February 22, 1937		at Kansas State	L 22–28	3–13 (0–8)	Nichols Hall; Manhattan, Kansas
February 27, 1937		Oklahoma	L 42–48	3–14 (0–9)	State Gymnasium; Ames, Iowa
March 3, 1937		Nebraska	L 31–48	3–15 (0–10)	State Gymnasium; Ames, Iowa
*Non-conference game. ^{#}Rankings from AP poll. (#) Tournament seedings in parentheses. All times are in Central Time.
