= 1936–37 Georgia Bulldogs basketball team =

American college basketball season

1936–37 Georgia Bulldogs basketball
- Conference: Southeastern Conference
- Record: 10–6 (5–3 SEC)
- Head coach: Rex Enright (6th season)
- Captain: Charles Harrold
- Home arena: Woodruff Hall

1936–37 Southeastern Conference men's basketball standings
	Conf.				Overall
Team	W		L	PCT	W		L	PCT
Georgia Tech	10	–	0	1.000	13	–	2	.867
Tennessee	7	–	1	.875	17	–	5	.773
Ole Miss	7	–	3	.700	20	–	6	.769
Auburn	7	–	4	.636	11	–	4	.733
Kentucky †	5	–	3	.625	17	–	5	.773
Georgia	5	–	3	.625	10	–	6	.625
LSU	7	–	6	.538	13	–	7	.650
Alabama	7	–	8	.467	11	–	10	.524
Mississippi State	6	–	7	.462	15	–	9	.625
Tulane	4	–	8	.333	6	–	8	.429
Vanderbilt	3	–	7	.300	6	–	10	.375
Florida	1	–	9	.100	5	–	13	.278
Sewanee	0	–	10	.000	1	–	15	.063
† Regular-season championship and SEC Tournament winner

The 1936–37 Georgia Bulldogs basketball team represented the University of Georgia as a member of the Southeastern Conference (SEC) during the 1936–37 NCAA men's basketball season. Led by Rex Enright in his sixth and final season as head coach, the Bulldogs compiled an overall record of 10–6 with a mark of 5–3 in conference play, tying for fifth place in the SEC. The team captain was Charles Harrold.

== Schedule ==
Date time, TV	Opponent	Result	Record	Site city, state
1/2/1937	Atlanta Semi-Pro	W 48-18	1–0	Athens, GA
1/8/1937	Chattanooga	W 34-24	2–0	Athens, GA
1/9/1937	Chattanooga	L 28-32	2–1	Athens, GA
1/15/1937	at Florida	W 31-30	3–1	
1/16/1937	at Florida	L 18-36	3–2	
1/22/1937	Mercer	W 37-33	4–2	Athens, GA
1/23/1937	at Clemson	W 36-35	5–2	
1/26/1937	Alabama	W 28-16	6–2	Athens, GA
1/30/1937	Ga. Tech	L 20-34	6–3	Athens, GA
2/5/1937	Florida	W 36-19	7–3	Athens, GA
2/6/1937	Florida	W 28-27	8–3	Athens, GA
2/12/1937	at Mercer	L 25-27	8–4	
2/13/1937	Clemson	W 29-20	9–4	Athens, GA
2/17/1937	Auburn	W 21-19	10–4	Athens, GA
2/20/1937	at Georgia Tech	L 22-42	10–5	
2/26/1937	Tennessee	L 21-36	10–6	Athens, GA
*Non-conference game. (#) Tournament seedings in parentheses.
