= 1937–38 Indiana Hoosiers men's basketball team =

American college basketball season

1937–38 Indiana Hoosiers men's basketball
- Conference: Big Ten Conference
- Record: 10–10 (4–8 Big Ten)
- Head coach: Everett Dean (14th season)
- Captain: Joseph Platt
- Home arena: The Fieldhouse

1937–38 Big Ten Conference men's basketball standings
	Conf.				Overall
Team	W		L	PCT	W		L	PCT
Purdue	10	–	2	.833	18	–	2	.900
Minnesota	9	–	3	.750	16	–	4	.800
Ohio State	7	–	5	.583	12	–	8	.600
Northwestern	7	–	5	.583	10	–	10	.500
Michigan	6	–	6	.500	12	–	8	.600
Iowa	6	–	6	.500	11	–	9	.550
Wisconsin	5	–	7	.417	10	–	10	.500
Illinois	4	–	8	.333	9	–	9	.500
Indiana	4	–	8	.333	10	–	10	.500
Chicago	2	–	10	.167	6	–	12	.333

The 1937–38 Indiana Hoosiers men's basketball team represented Indiana University. Their head coach was Everett Dean, who was in his 14th and final year. The team played its home games in The Fieldhouse in Bloomington, Indiana, and was a member of the Big Ten Conference.

The Hoosiers finished the regular season with an overall record of 10–10 and a conference record of 4–8, finishing 8th in the Big Ten Conference.

== Roster ==
No.	Name	Position	Ht.	Year	Hometown
3	Ralph Dorsey	F	5–10	Jr.	Horse Cave, Kentucky
4	William Johnson	G	6–1	Jr.	Jeffersonville, Indiana
5	Ernie Andres	G	6–1	Jr.	Jeffersonville, Indiana
6	James Birr	C	6–3	Sr.	Indianapolis, Indiana
7	Joseph Platt	G	5–11	Sr.	Young America, Indiana
8	Marv Huffman	G	6–2	So.	New Castle, Indiana
9	Jack Stevenson	F	6–1	So.	Indianapolis, Indiana
10	David Bowman	G	6–1	So.	Veedersburg, Indiana
11	James Fausch	F	6–2	So.	Michigan City, Indiana
12	Jay McCreary	G	5–10	So.	Frankfort, Indiana
13	Jim Ooley	G	6–2	So.	Spencer, Indiana
15	Peter Grant	F	6–2	So.	Indianapolis, Indiana
16	Greg Ricke	G	5–11	So.	Shelbyville, Indiana
17	Roger Ratliff	C/G	6–3	Sr.	Mooresville, Indiana
18	Ed Page	G	6–1	So.	Shelbyville, Indiana
19	Dale Gentil	F	6–2	So.	Mount Vernon, Indiana
20	Lyman Abbot	G	5–9	Jr.	Martinsville, Indiana

== Schedule/results ==
Date time, TV	Rank^{#}	Opponent^{#}	Result	Record	Site city, state
Regular season
12/6/1937*		DePauw	W 45–25	1–0	The Fieldhouse; Bloomington, IN
12/11/1937*		at Ball State	L 38–42	1–1	Ball Gymnasium; Muncie, IN
12/21/1937*		at Bradley	L 39–50	1–2	Peoria, IL
12/23/1937*		at Nebraska	W 43–42	2–2	Nebraska Coliseum; Lincoln, NE
12/28/1937*		at UCLA	W 42–33	3–2	Men's Gym; Los Angeles, CA
12/29/1937*		at USC	W 42–39	4–2	Shrine Auditorium; Los Angeles, CA
1/4/1938		Illinois; Rivalry	W 51–46	5–2 (1–0)	The Fieldhouse; Bloomington, IN
1/8/1938		at Iowa	L 39–48	5–3 (1–1)	Iowa Field House; Iowa City, IA
1/10/1938		at Minnesota	W 39–38	6–3 (2–1)	Minnesota Field House; Minneapolis, MN
1/5/1938		Northwestern	L 29–32	6–4 (2–2)	The Fieldhouse; Bloomington, IN
1/17/1938		Iowa	L 32–36	6–5 (2–3)	The Fieldhouse; Bloomington, IN
2/1/1938*		at Butler	W 42–23	7–5 (2–3)	Butler Fieldhouse; Indianapolis, IN
2/5/1938		at Purdue; Rivalry	L 36–38	7–6 (2–4)	Lambert Fieldhouse; West Lafayette, IN
2/7/1938		Wisconsin	W 47–44	8–6 (3–4)	The Fieldhouse; Bloomington, IN
2/12/1938*		at Louisville	W 59–40	9–6 (3–4)	Belknap Gymnasium; Louisville, KY
2/19/1938		at Northwestern	L 41–52	9–7 (3–5)	Old Patten Gymnasium; Evanston, IL
2/21/1938		Minnesota	L 36–37	9–8 (3–6)	The Fieldhouse; Bloomington, IN
2/26/1938		Purdue; Rivalry	L 36–50	9–9 (3–7)	The Fieldhouse; Bloomington, IN
2/28/1938		at Wisconsin	L 32–34	9–10 (3–8)	Wisconsin Field House; Madison, WI
3/4/1938		at Illinois; Rivalry	W 45–35	10–10 (4–8)	Huff Hall; Champaign, IL
*Non-conference game. ^{#}Rankings from AP Poll. (#) Tournament seedings in parentheses.
