= 1936–37 UCLA Bruins men's basketball team =

American college basketball season

1936–37 UCLA Bruins men's basketball
- Conference: Pacific Coast Conference
- South
- Record: 6–15 (2–10 PCC)
- Head coach: Caddy Works (16th season)
- Assistant coaches: Wilbur Johns; Silas Gibbs; Dick Linthicum

1936–37 Pacific Coast Conference men's basketball standings
	Conf.				Overall
Team	W		L	PCT	W		L	PCT
North
Washington State	11	–	5	.688	24	–	8	.750
Oregon	11	–	5	.688	20	–	9	.690
Washington	11	–	5	.688	15	–	11	.577
Oregon State	5	–	11	.313	11	–	15	.423
Idaho	2	–	14	.125	8	–	19	.296
South
Stanford †	10	–	2	.833	25	–	2	.926
USC	8	–	4	.667	19	–	6	.760
California	4	–	8	.333	17	–	10	.630
UCLA	2	–	10	.167	6	–	13	.316
† Conference playoff series winner

The 1936–37 UCLA Bruins men's basketball team represented the University of California, Los Angeles during the 1936–37 NCAA men's basketball season and were members of the Pacific Coast Conference. The Bruins were led by 16th year head coach Caddy Works. They finished the regular season with a record of 6–15 (Note: UCLA record books like 15 losses but conference record books list 13 losses) and were fourth in the southern division with a record of 2–10.

== Previous season ==
The Bruins finished the regular season with a record of 10–13 and were fourth in the southern division with a record of 2–10.

== Roster ==
1936–37 UCLA Bruins men's basketball team
Players
Coaches

Pos.	#	Name	Height	Weight	Year	Hometown
F	4	Orv Abbleby (C)	—	—
C	18	John Ball	—	—
		Bob Calkins	—	—
		Jack Cooper	—	—
F	34	Crossan Hays	—	—	So
	22	Kenneth Lueke	—	—
	25	Bill Reitz	—	—
		Bill Robinson	—	—
		Paul Slaughter	—	—

Head coach

Caddy Works

Assistant coach(es)

- Wilbur Johns (UCLA)
- Silas Gibbs (UCLA)
- Dick Linthicum (UCLA)

Legend

- (C) Team captain
- (S) Suspended
- (I) Ineligible
- (W) Walk-on
- Injured
- Current redshirt

Roster
Last update: 30 January 2018

== Schedule ==
Date time, TV	Rank^{#}	Opponent^{#}	Result	Record	Site city, state
Regular Season
*		Compton Junior College	W 39–6	1–0	Men's Gym; Los Angeles, CA
*		Los Angeles Junior College	W 41–30	2–0	Men's Gym; Los Angeles, CA
		at Oregon	L 30–54	2–1	McArthur Court; Eugene, OR
		at Washington State	L 23–33	2–2	Bohler Gymnasium; Pullman, WA
		at Idaho	W 45–34	3–2	Memorial Gymnasium; Moscow, ID
		at Idaho	L 26–30	3–3	Memorial Gymnasium; Moscow, ID
		at Oregon State	W 40–38	4–3	Oregon State Coliseum; Corvallis, OR
		Washington	L 51–52 ^{OT}	4–4	Men's Gym; Los Angeles, CA
*		Ohio State	L 39–48	4–5	Men's Gym; Los Angeles, CA
		USC	L 31–41	4–6 (0–1)	Men's Gym; Los Angeles, CA
		at Stanford	L 40–63	4–7 (0–2)	Stanford Pavilion; Stanford, CA
		at Stanford	L 36–69	4–8 (0–3)	Stanford Pavilion; Stanford, CA
		USC	L 31–36	4–9 (0–4)	Men's Gym; Los Angeles, CA
		at California	L 27–33	4–10 (0–5)	Men's Gym; Berkeley, CA
		at California	W 46–44 ^{OT}	5–10 (1–5)	Men's Gym; Berkeley, CA
		Stanford	L 40–42	5–11 (1–6)	Men's Gym; Los Angeles, CA
		Stanford	L 38–67	5–12 (1–7)	Men's Gym; Los Angeles, CA
		USC	L 36–46	5–13 (1–8)	Men's Gym; Los Angeles, CA
*		California	W 37–33	6–13 (2–8)	Men's Gym; Los Angeles, CA
		California	L 31–43	6–14 (2–9)	Men's Gym; Los Angeles, CA
		USC	L 29–43	6–15 (2–10)	Men's Gym; Los Angeles, CA
		USC	L 29–43	6–15 (2–10)	Men's Gym; Los Angeles, CA
*Non-conference game. ^{#}Rankings from AP Poll. (#) Tournament seedings in parentheses. All times are in Pacific Time.
