= 1936–37 Michigan Wolverines men's basketball team =

American college basketball season

1936–37 Michigan Wolverines men's basketball
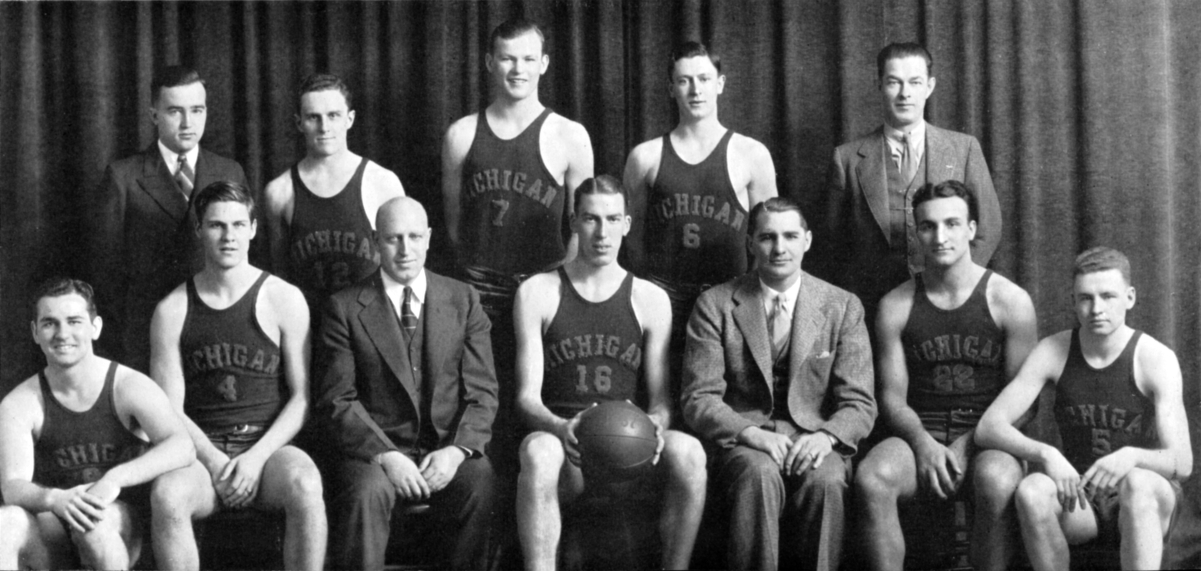
- Conference: Big Ten Conference
- Record: 16–4 (9–3 Big Ten)
- Head coach: Franklin Cappon
- Captain: Johnny Gee
- Home arena: Yost Field House

1936–37 Big Ten Conference men's basketball standings
	Conf.				Overall
Team	W		L	PCT	W		L	PCT
Illinois	10	–	2	.833	14	–	4	.778
Minnesota	10	–	2	.833	14	–	6	.700
Michigan	9	–	3	.750	16	–	4	.800
Purdue	8	–	4	.667	15	–	5	.750
Ohio State	7	–	5	.583	13	–	7	.650
Indiana	6	–	6	.500	13	–	7	.650
Northwestern	4	–	8	.333	11	–	9	.550
Iowa	3	–	9	.250	11	–	9	.550
Wisconsin	3	–	9	.250	8	–	12	.400
Chicago	0	–	12	.000	4	–	16	.200

The 1936–37 Michigan Wolverines men's basketball team represented the University of Michigan in intercollegiate basketball during the 1936–37 season. The team compiled a 16–4 record, and 9–3 against Big Ten Conference opponents. The team scored 741 points in 20 games for an average of 37.1 points per game – the highest point total and scoring per game in school history up to that time. Michigan finished in third place in the Big Ten.

The team opened the season with a 61–12 victory over Michigan Normal (now known as Eastern Michigan University), setting a new scoring record at Yost Field House. During the winter break, the team traveled to Seattle, Washington, to play three games against the University of Washington. Team captain Johnny Gee (who later played professional baseball and basketball), was unavailable to play during the west coast trip due to a broken nose. Michigan won two out of the three games in Seattle.

Franklin "Cappy" Cappon was in his sixth year as the team's coach. Cappon had played basketball and football at Michigan from 1919 to 1923. As a senior, he was awarded the Western Conference Medal for all-around excellence in both athletics and academics. After seven seasons as Michigan's head coach, Cappon served as the head basketball coach from 1938 to 1961 at Princeton University, where he mentored Butch van Breda Kolff, Bill Bradley and Frank Deford. He compiled a combined record of 340–242 at Michigan and Princeton and was inducted into the Helms Foundation College Basketball Hall of Fame in 1957.

John "Jake" Townsend, a six-foot, four inch center from Indiana, was the team leading scorer for three straight seasons. He scored 154 points during the 1935–36 season, 191 points during the 1936–37 season, and 226 points during the 1937-38 season. Townsend's 191 points during the 1936–37 season broke the school's single season scoring record of 181 points set by Arthur Karpus in the 1918–19 season. His career total of 571 points also broke Karpus's career scoring record of 338 points. Townsend was selected as a unanimous All-Big Ten player at the end of the 1936–37 season and later played professional basketball in the National Basketball League for the Indianapolis Kautskys, Oshkosh All-Stars and Rochester Royals.

== Schedule ==
Date	Opponent	Score	Result	Location
Dec. 7, 1936	Michigan Normal	61–12	Win	Yost Field House, Ann Arbor, MI
Dec. 12, 1936	Michigan State	34–21	Win	Yost Field House, Ann Arbor, MI
Dec. 21, 1936	Washington	40–23	Loss	Seattle, Washington
Dec. 22, 1936	Washington	34–32	Win	Seattle, Washington
Dec. 23, 1936	Washington	39–33	Win	Seattle, Washington
Jan. 1, 1937	Toledo	41–33	Win	Toledo, Ohio
Jan. 5, 1937	Butler	36–27	Win	Indianapolis, IN
Jan. 9, 1937	Purdue	37–26	Loss	Lafayette, IN
Jan. 11, 1937	Northwestern	34–31	Win	Yost Field House, Ann Arbor, MI
Jan. 16, 1937	Wisconsin	41–31	Win	Madison, WI
Jan. 18, 1937	Chicago	35–29	Win	Henry Crown Field House, Chicago, IL
Jan. 23, 1937	Ohio State	37–32	Loss	Yost Field House, Ann Arbor, MI
Jan. 25, 1937	Chicago	32–19	Win	Yost Field House, Ann Arbor, MI
Feb. 13, 1937	Michigan State	38–31	Win	East Lansing, MI
Feb. 15, 1937	Indiana	55 31	Win	Yost Field House, Ann Arbor, MI
Feb. 20, 1937	Northwestern	34–32	Win	Evanston, IL
Feb. 22, 1937	Purdue	31–16	Win	Yost Field House, Ann Arbor, MI
Feb. 27, 1937	Ohio State	38–24	Win	Columbus, OH
March 1, 1937	Indiana	31–27	Loss	Bloomington, IN
March 6, 1937	Wisconsin	41–27	Win	Yost Field House, Ann Arbor, MI

== Scoring statistics ==
Player	Games	Field goals	Free throws	Points	Points per game
John "Jake" Townsend	20	65	61-96	191	9.6
Johnny Gee	18	60	30-49	150	8.3
Herman Fishman	19	51	23-38	125	6.6
Bill Barclay	20	32	28-41	92	4.6
Matt Patanelli	20	33	18-29	84	4.2
Edmund Thomas	19	20	3-15	43	2.3
Daniel Smick	13	11	1-8	23	1.8
Leo Beebe	16	4	5-9	13	0.8
Manuel Slavin	4	3	0-1	6	1.5
Richard Long	11	2	1-2	5	0.5
Payne	1	1	1-2	3	3.0
Louis Levine	1	1	0-0	2	2.0
Richard Joslin	1	1	0-0	2	2.0
Ferris Jennings	10	1	0-1	2	0.2
William Lane	4	0	0-0	0	0.0
Totals	20	285	171-292	740	37.1

== Coaching staff ==
- Franklin Cappon - coach
- Assistant coaches: Bennie Oosterbaan
- Fielding H. Yost - athletic director
