= 1937–38 Wisconsin Badgers men's basketball team =

American college basketball season

1937–38 Wisconsin Badgers men's basketball
- Conference: Big Ten Conference
- Record: 10–10 (5–7 Big Ten)
- Head coach: Harold E. Foster
- Home arena: UW Fieldhouse

1937–38 Big Ten Conference men's basketball standings
	Conf.				Overall
Team	W		L	PCT	W		L	PCT
Purdue	10	–	2	.833	18	–	2	.900
Minnesota	9	–	3	.750	16	–	4	.800
Ohio State	7	–	5	.583	12	–	8	.600
Northwestern	7	–	5	.583	10	–	10	.500
Michigan	6	–	6	.500	12	–	8	.600
Iowa	6	–	6	.500	11	–	9	.550
Wisconsin	5	–	7	.417	10	–	10	.500
Illinois	4	–	8	.333	9	–	9	.500
Indiana	4	–	8	.333	10	–	10	.500
Chicago	2	–	10	.167	6	–	12	.333

The 1937–38 Wisconsin Badgers men's basketball team represented University of Wisconsin–Madison. The head coach was Harold E. Foster, coaching his fourth season with the Badgers. The team played their home games at the UW Fieldhouse in Madison, Wisconsin and was a member of the Big Ten Conference.

== Schedule ==
Date time, TV	Rank^{#}	Opponent^{#}	Result	Record	Site city, state
Regular Season
12/04/1937*		Marquette	L 21–32	0–1	UW Fieldhouse; Madison, WI
12/06/1937*		North Dakota	W 41–22	1–1	UW Fieldhouse; Madison, WI
12/11/1937*		Pittsburgh	W 44–36	2–1	UW Fieldhouse; Madison, WI
12/13/1937*		at Notre Dame	L 31–33	2–2	Notre Dame Fieldhouse; Notre Dame, IN
12/18/1937*		at Marquette	L 32–38	2–3	Marquette Gymnasium; Milwaukee, WI
12/31/1937*		Missouri	W 40–29	3–3	UW Fieldhouse; Madison, WI
1/03/1938		at Northwestern	L 38–47	3–4 (0–1)	Patten Gymnasium; Evanston, IL
1/08/1938		Minnesota	W 35–28	4–4 (1–1)	UW Fieldhouse; Madison, WI
1/10/1938		Chicago	W 50–27	5–4 (2–1)	UW Fieldhouse; Madison, WI
1/15/1938		at Purdue	L 34–40	5–5 (2–2)	Lambert Fieldhouse; West Lafayette, IN
1/17/1938		Michigan	W 39–30	6–5 (3–2)	UW Fieldhouse; Madison, WI
2/05/1938*		Michigan State	W 30–27	7–5	UW Fieldhouse; Madison, WI
2/07/1938		at Indiana	L 44–47	7–6 (3–3)	IU Fieldhouse; Bloomington, IN
2/12/1938		Northwestern	L 23–27	7–7 (3–4)	UW Fieldhouse; Madison, WI
2/14/1938		at Chicago	W 46–32	8–7 (4–4)	Henry Crown Field House; Chicago, IL
2/19/1938		Purdue	L 39–46	8–8 (4–5)	UW Fieldhouse; Madison, WI
2/21/1938		at Michigan	L 29–58	8–9 (4–6)	Yost Field House; Ann Arbor, MI
2/23/1938*		at Pennsylvania	W 52–44	9–9	Palestra; Philadelphia, PA
2/28/1938		Indiana	W 34–32	10–9 (5–6)	UW Fieldhouse; Madison, WI
3/05/1938		at Minnesota	L 28–35	10–10 (5–7)	Minnesota Field House; Minneapolis, MN
*Non-conference game. ^{#}Rankings from AP Poll. (#) Tournament seedings in parentheses.
