= 1936–37 Kansas Jayhawks men's basketball team =

American college basketball season

1936–37 Kansas Jayhawks men's basketball
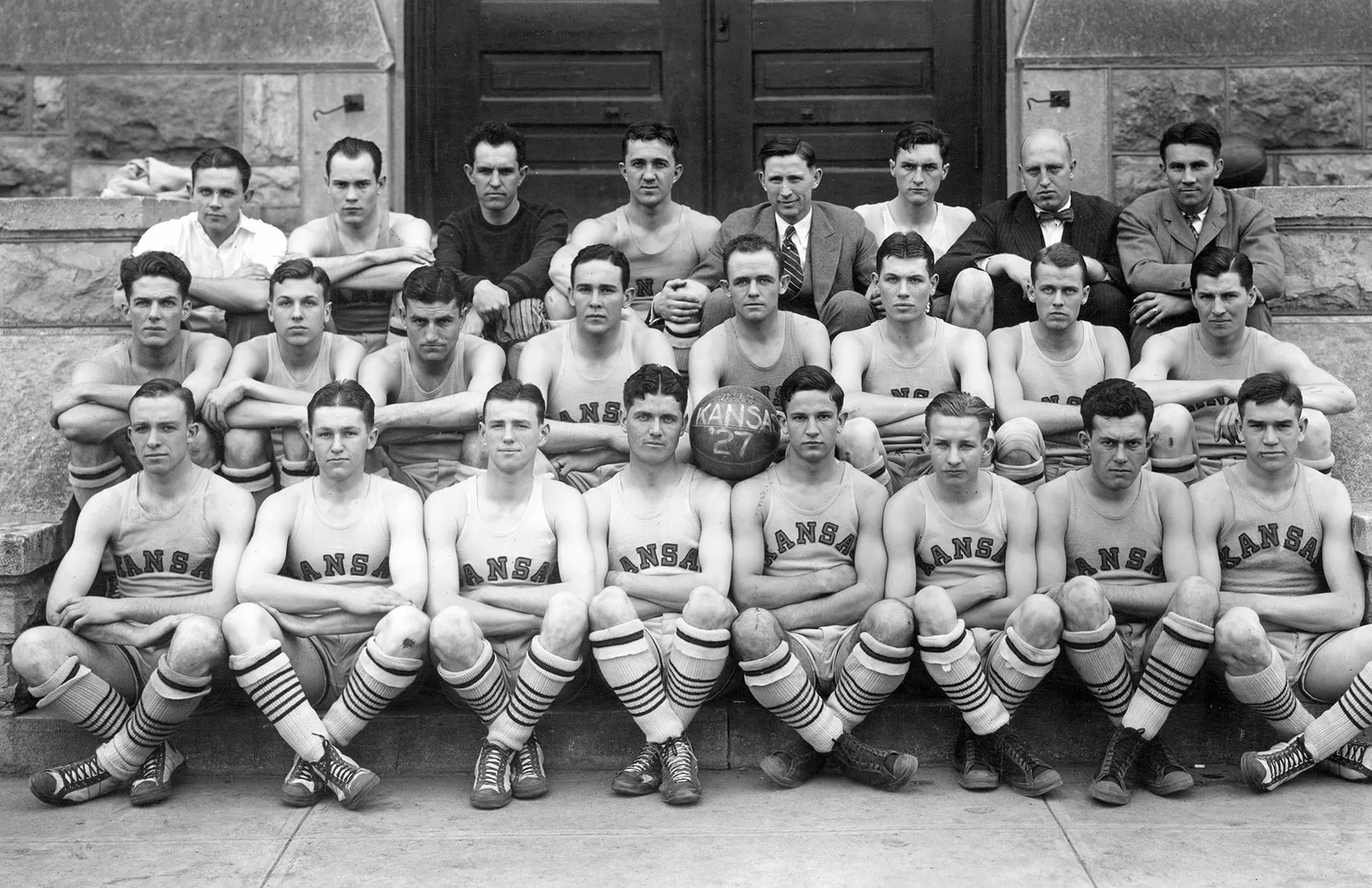

Big Six Co-Champions
- Conference: Big Six Conference
- Record: 15–4 (8–2 Big 6)
- Head coach: Phog Allen (20th season)
- Captains: Raymond Noble; Paul Rogers
- Home arena: Hoch Auditorium

1936–37 Big Six Conference men's basketball standings
	Conf.				Overall
Team	W		L	PCT	W		L	PCT
Kansas	8	–	2	.800	15	–	4	.789
Nebraska	8	–	2	.800	13	–	7	.650
Oklahoma	7	–	3	.700	12	–	4	.750
Kansas State	5	–	5	.500	9	–	9	.500
Missouri	2	–	8	.200	7	–	9	.438
Iowa State	0	–	10	.000	3	–	15	.167

The 1936–37 Kansas Jayhawks men's basketball team represented the University of Kansas during the 1936–37 college men's basketball season.

== Roster ==
- Roy Holliday
- Fred Pralle
- Fred Bosilevac
- Carl Weidner
- Fenlon Durand
- George Golay
- Sylvester Schmidt
- Lyman Corlis
- Lester Kappelman
- Raymond Noble
- Al Wellhausen
- Paul Rogers
- Dave Lutton

== Schedule ==
Date time, TV	Rank^{#}	Opponent^{#}	Result	Record	Site city, state
December 3*		Washburn	W 30–26	1-0	Hoch Auditorium; Lawrence, KS
December 11*		at Southwestern (KS)	L 22–26	1-1	Stewart Field House; Winfield, KS
December 16*		at Baker	W 36–35	2-1	Collins Gymnasium; Baldwin, KS
December 17*		Southwestern (KS)	W 39–27	3-1	Hoch Auditorium; Lawrence, KS
December 29*		at Kansas Wesleyan	W 36–23	4-1	Salina, KS
January 5*		Baker	L 27–32	4-2	Hoch Auditorium; Lawrence, KS
January 9		at Oklahoma	W 28–26	5-2 (1-0)	Field House; Norman, OK
January 12*		Mexico	W 42–22	6-2	Hoch Auditorium; Lawrence, KS
January 26*		Missouri; Border War	W 39–27	7-2 (2-0)	Hoch Auditorium; Lawrence, KS
January 19		Kansas State; Sunflower Showdown	W 39–28	8-2 (3-0)	Hoch Auditorium; Lawrence, KS
January 23*		Washburn	W 42–27	9-2	Topeka, KS
January 29*		Rockhurst	W 35–19	10-2	Hoch Auditorium; Lawrence, KS
February 2		Nebraska	W 27–22	11-2 (4-0)	Hoch Auditorium; Lawrence, KS
February 5		at Iowa State	W 36–26	12-2 (5-0)	State Gymnasium; Ames, IA
February 11		at Kansas State; Sunflower Showdown	L 32–33	12-3 (5-1)	Nichols Hall; Manhattan, KS
February 13		Iowa State	W 41–28	13-3 (6-1)	Hoch Auditorium; Lawrence, KS
February 20		Oklahoma	W 39–19	14-3 (7-1)	Hoch Auditorium; Lawrence, KS
February 27		at Nebraska	L 32–37	14-4 (7-2)	Nebraska Coliseum; Lincoln, NE
March 4		at Missouri; Border War	W 39–24	15-4 (8-2)	Brewer Fieldhouse; Columbia, MO
*Non-conference game. ^{#}Rankings from AP Poll. (#) Tournament seedings in parentheses.
