= 1937–38 Illinois Fighting Illini men's basketball team =

American college basketball season

1937–38 Illinois Fighting Illini men's basketball
- Conference: Big Ten Conference
- Record: 9–9 (4–8 Big Ten)
- Head coach: Douglas Mills (2nd season)
- Assistant coaches: Howie Braun (1st season); Wally Roettger (3rd season)
- Captain: Lou Boudreau
- Home arena: Huff Hall

1937–38 Big Ten Conference men's basketball standings
	Conf.				Overall
Team	W		L	PCT	W		L	PCT
Purdue	10	–	2	.833	18	–	2	.900
Minnesota	9	–	3	.750	16	–	4	.800
Ohio State	7	–	5	.583	12	–	8	.600
Northwestern	7	–	5	.583	10	–	10	.500
Michigan	6	–	6	.500	12	–	8	.600
Iowa	6	–	6	.500	11	–	9	.550
Wisconsin	5	–	7	.417	10	–	10	.500
Illinois	4	–	8	.333	9	–	9	.500
Indiana	4	–	8	.333	10	–	10	.500
Chicago	2	–	10	.167	6	–	12	.333

The 1937–38 Illinois Fighting Illini men's basketball team represented the University of Illinois.

== Regular season ==
The 1937–38 season for second year head coach Doug Mills took a major step backward after finishing in a first place tie a year earlier. Mills' Illinois Fighting Illini men's basketball team dropped to a tie for eighth place in the Big Ten during his sophomore season. This team featured future major league baseball hall of fame shortstop and manager, Lou Boudreau. Even though they returned 6 letterman, the Illini finished the season with a conference record of 4 wins and 8 losses (the worst of Mills' career at Illinois). The team finished the season with an overall record of 9 wins 9 losses. Along with team captain Boudreau, the Illini also featured a starting lineup of Lewis Dehner at the center position, Joe Frank and William Hapac at forward and George Wardley, Tom Nisbit and Colin Handlon at guard.

=== Roster ===
1937–38 Illinois Fighting Illini men's basketball team
Players
Coaches

Pos.	#	Name	Height	Weight	Year	Hometown
G	3	Colin Handlon	—	—	So	Connersville, Indiana
F	6	Harry Lasater Jr.	—	—	So	Fairfield, Illinois
C	8	Lewis Dehner	—	—	Jr	Lincoln, Illinois
G	10	Carlos Davies	—	—	So	Streator, Illinois
F	11	Charles Phillips	—	—	So	Ridgway, Illinois
G	15	George Wardley	—	—	Jr	Gary, Indiana
F	17	Joe Frank	—	—	So	Urbana, Illinois
G	18	Tom Nisbet	—	—	Jr	Chicago, Illinois
F	19	William Hapac	—	—	So	Cicero, Illinois
F	21	Lou Boudreau (C)	—	—	Jr	Harvey, Illinois
F	22	William Bennis	—	—	Sr	Freeport, Illinois
G	28	Jack Hodges	—	—	Jr	Rock Island, Illinois
G	27	Orval Spurlin	—	—	So	Kinmundy, Illinois
F	33	Thomas Bouzeos	—	—	So	Chicago, Illinois
F	55	Carter Cooley	—	—	Jr	Chicago, Illinois

Head coach

- Douglas Mills (University of Illinois) (2nd year)

Assistant coach(es)

- Wally Roettger (University of Illinois) (3rd year)
- Howie Braun (University of Illinois) (1st year)

Legend

- (C) Team captain
- (S) Suspended
- (I) Ineligible
- (W) Walk-on
- Injured
- Current redshirt

Roster

== Schedule ==
Date time, TV	Rank^{#}	Opponent^{#}	Result	Record	Site (attendance) city, state
Non-Conference regular season
12/7/1937*		Carroll	W 48–25	1–0	Huff Hall (6,500); Champaign, IL
12/11/1937*		at Augustana	W 43–27	2–0	Old Main Gymnasium (5,000); Rock Island, IL
12/15/1937*		Washington (St. Louis)	W 40–36	3–0	Huff Hall (6,800); Champaign, IL
12/18/1937*		at St. John's	W 60–45	4–0	Madison Square Garden (17,000); New York, NY
12/20/1937*		at Temple	L 38–51	4–1	Municipal Auditorium (4,000); Philadelphia, PA
12/28/1937*		Notre Dame	W 33–32	5–1	Huff Hall (8,500); Champaign, IL
Big Ten regular season
1/4/1938		at Indiana; Rivalry	L 46–51	5–2 (0–1)	IU Fieldhouse (6,000); Bloomington, IN
1/8/1938		at Michigan	L 37–45	5–3 (0–2)	Yost Field House (–); Ann Arbor, MI
1/10/1938		Purdue	W 51–43	6–3 (1–2)	Huff Hall (7,100); Champaign, IL
1/15/1938		University of Chicago	W 50–34	7–3 (2–2)	Huff Hall (7,100); Champaign, IL
1/17/1938		Minnesota	L 29–41	7–4 (2–3)	Huff Hall (7,100); Champaign, IL
1/22/1938		at Ohio State	L 26–46	7–5 (2–4)	Ohio Expo Center Coliseum (7,500); Columbus, OH
2/7/1938		at Purdue	L 13–23	7–6 (2–5)	Lambert Fieldhouse (5,000); West Lafayette, IN
2/12/1938		at Minnesota	L 23–28	7–7 (2–6)	Williams Arena (6,800); Minneapolis, MN
2/19/1938		Ohio State	W 42–34	8–7 (3–6)	Huff Hall (7,000); Champaign, IL
2/21/1938		at University of Chicago	L 39–43	8–8 (3–7)	Henry Crown Field House (5,000); Chicago, IL
2/28/1938		Michigan	W 36–32	9–8 (4–7)	Huff Hall (7,000); Champaign, IL
3/4/1938		Indiana; Rivalry	L 35–45	9–9 (4–8)	Huff Hall (7,000); Champaign, IL
*Non-conference game. ^{#}Rankings from AP Poll. (#) Tournament seedings in parentheses. All times are in Central Time.

== Awards and honors ==
- Lou Boudreau
  - Madison Square Garden 1st team All-American
- Louis Dehner
  - Converse 3rd team All-American
