= 1936–37 Stanford Indians men's basketball team =

American college basketball season

1936–37 Stanford Indians men's basketball

Pacific Coast Conference Champions Helms Foundation National Champions
- Conference: Pacific Coast Conference
- South
- Record: 25–2 (10–2 PCC)
- Head coach: John Bunn (7th season)
- Home arena: Stanford Pavilion

1936–37 Pacific Coast Conference men's basketball standings
	Conf.				Overall
Team	W		L	PCT	W		L	PCT
North
Washington State	11	–	5	.688	24	–	8	.750
Oregon	11	–	5	.688	20	–	9	.690
Washington	11	–	5	.688	15	–	11	.577
Oregon State	5	–	11	.313	11	–	15	.423
Idaho	2	–	14	.125	8	–	19	.296
South
Stanford †	10	–	2	.833	25	–	2	.926
USC	8	–	4	.667	19	–	6	.760
California	4	–	8	.333	17	–	10	.630
UCLA	2	–	10	.167	6	–	13	.316
† Conference playoff series winner

The 1936–37 Stanford Indians men's basketball team represented Stanford University during the 1936–37 NCAA men's basketball season in the United States. The head coach was John Bunn, coaching in his seventh season with the Indians (now known as the Cardinal). The team finished the season with a 25–2 record. Later, the team was retroactively named the national champion by the Helms Athletic Foundation and was retroactively listed as the top-ranked team of the season by the Premo-Porretta Power Poll. Neither the Helms nor Premo-Porretta designations are recognized by the NCAA as official national championships, despite the NCAA referencing Helms's historical findings.

Hank Luisetti led the NCAA in scoring, was named a consensus All-American for the second consecutive season, and was named the Helms Foundation National Player of the Year. Luisetti was later inducted into the Naismith Memorial Basketball Hall of Fame.

The National Invitation Tournament (NIT) debuted the next year, and the NCAA tournament in 1939.

== Schedule and results ==
Date time, TV	Rank^{#}	Opponent^{#}	Result	Record	Site city, state
Regular season
*		California Aggies	W 41–16	1–0	Stanford Pavilion; Stanford, CA
*		Olympic Club	W 60–49	2–0	Stanford Pavilion; Stanford, CA
*		at San Jose State	W 31–24	3–0	San Jose, CA
*		vs. Warrensburg State	W 51–31	4–0	Kansas City, MO
*		Temple	W 45–38	5–0	Stanford Pavilion; Stanford, CA
12/30/1936*		at Long Island	W 45–31	6–0	New York, NY
*		at Canisius	W 39–29	7–0	Buffalo, NY
*		at Western Reserve	W 67–27	8–0	Cleveland, OH
*		at Hamline	W 58–26	9–0	Saint Paul, MN
*		at Montana State			Bozeman, MT
		UCLA	W 63–40	11–0 (1–0)	Stanford Pavilion; Stanford, CA
		UCLA	W 69–36	12–0 (2–0)	Stanford Pavilion; Stanford, CA
		at California	W 51–35	13–0 (3–0)	Haas Pavilion; Berkeley, CA
*		Saint Mary's	W 50–23	14–0	Stanford Pavilion; Stanford, CA
		at USC	L 39–42	14–1 (3–1)	Shrine Auditorium; Los Angeles, CA
		at USC	W 61–49	15–1 (4–1)	Shrine Auditorium; Los Angeles, CA
		California	W 50–37	16–1 (5–1)	Stanford Pavilion; Stanford, CA
*		at San Francisco	W 51–34	17–1	San Francisco Civic Auditorium; San Francisco, CA
		at UCLA	W 42–40	18–1 (6–1)	Men's Gym; Los Angeles, CA
		at UCLA	W 67–38	19–1 (7–1)	Men's Gym; Los Angeles, CA
		at California	W 36–32	20–1 (8–1)	Haas Pavilion; Berkeley, CA
*		Santa Clara	W 54–25	21–1	Stanford Pavilion; Stanford, CA
		USC	W 39–34	22–1 (9–1)	Stanford Pavilion; Stanford, CA
		USC	W 47–38	23–1 (10–1)	Stanford Pavilion; Stanford, CA
		California	L 31–44	23–2 (10–2)	Stanford Pavilion; Stanford, CA
Pacific Coast Conference Playoff Series
3/26/1937*		at Washington State	W 31–28	24–2	WSC Gymnasium; Pullman, WA
3/27/1937*		at Washington State	W 41–40	25–2	WSC Gymnasium; Pullman, WA
*Non-conference game. ^{#}Rankings from AP Poll. (#) Tournament seedings in parentheses.
