= Johnny Gee =

American baseball player (1915–1988)

- Gee with the New York Giants, c. 1945
- Pitcher
- Born: December 7, 1915; Syracuse, New York, U.S.
- Died: January 23, 1988 (aged 72); Cortland, New York, U.S.
- Batted: Left Threw: Left

MLB debut
- September 17, 1939, for the Pittsburgh Pirates

Last MLB appearance
- September 26, 1946, for the New York Giants

MLB statistics
- Win–loss record: 7–12
- Earned run average: 4.41
- Strikeouts: 65
- Stats at Baseball Reference

Teams
- Pittsburgh Pirates (1939, 1941, 1943–1944); New York Giants (1944–1946)

John Alexander Gee Jr. (December 7, 1915 – January 23, 1988), sometimes known as "Long John Gee" and "Whiz", was an American professional baseball and basketball player.

Gee played Major League Baseball for the Pittsburgh Pirates from 1939 to 1944 and for the New York Giants from 1944 to 1946. In August 1939, he was one of the top pitching prospects in the minor leagues when he was purchased by the Pirates in exchange for $75,000 (equivalent to $1.7 million in 2024) and four players – the highest price paid by the Pirates for a player until the purchase of Hank Greenberg in 1947. After suffering an injury to his throwing arm during spring training in 1940, his performance suffered, and he was sometimes referred to as the "$75,000 lemon."

At six feet, nine inches, Gee was the tallest person to play Major League Baseball until Randy Johnson debuted for the Montreal Expos in September 1988. Gee also played professional basketball for the Syracuse Nationals. In November 1946, he became the leading scorer for the Nationals in their first home game and first win as a member of the National Basketball League.

Gee also played college baseball and basketball at the University of Michigan from 1935 to 1937. He was the captain of the 1936–37 Michigan Wolverines basketball team and struck out 21 batters in a June 1937 baseball game. He received the Big Ten Medal of Honor as the student in the Class of 1937 who had best demonstrated proficiency in both scholarship and athletics.

== Early years ==
Gee was born in Syracuse, New York, in 1915. His parents were John Alexander Gee Sr., and Anna Alvira (Nicholson) Gee. At the time of the 1920 U.S. Census, Gee was living with his parents and older sister Mildred in Syracuse's 13th Ward. His father was employed as a janitor at a school. Ten years later, at the time of the 1930 Census, the family remained in Syracuse, and Gee's father was employed as the superintendent of repairs for the city schools.

== University of Michigan (1933–1937) ==
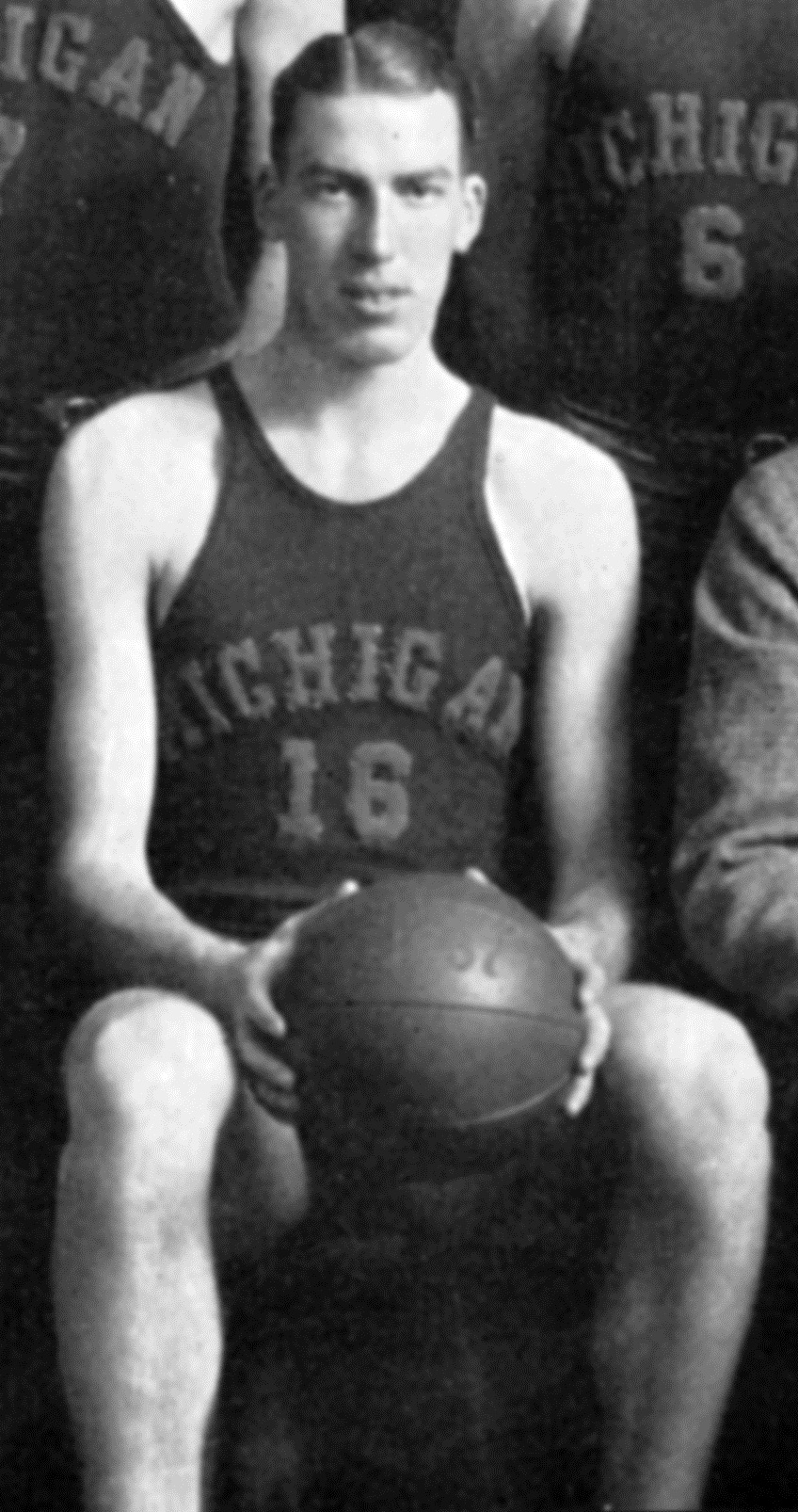
Gee, captain of the 1937 Michigan basketball team

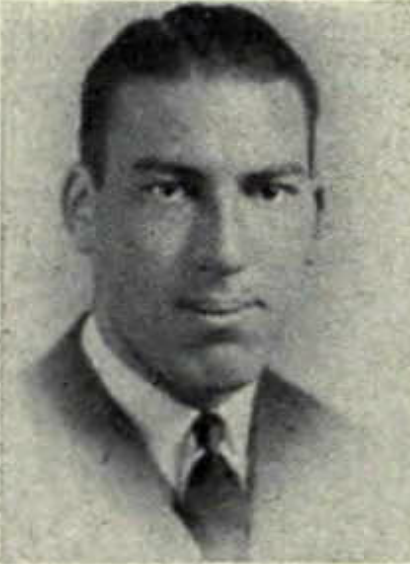
Gee's senior portrait from the University of Michigan

After graduating from high school, Gee enrolled at the University of Michigan in 1933. While attending Michigan, he played center for the Michigan Wolverines men's basketball team from 1934 to 1937. He was the tallest basketball player in the Western Conference at the time. As a sophomore, Gee was the second leading scorer on the 1934–35 Wolverines basketball team, scoring 64 points in 17 games. He added 74 points as a junior for 1935–36 basketball team and was selected as the captain of Michigan's 1936–37 team. Despite sustaining a broken nose, Gee scored 150 points in 18 games for the Wolverines during his senior year and helped lead the team to a 16–4 record.

Although known principally as a basketball player at Michigan, the school's baseball coach Ray Fisher, who had been a pitcher for the New York Yankees and Cincinnati Reds, persuaded Gee to play baseball as well. Gee was a pitcher for the Michigan Wolverines baseball team for three years from 1935 to 1937. On June 3, 1937, Gee struck out 21 batters and allowed only three hits in a 12–2 victory over the University of Toledo.

Gee received the Big Ten Medal of Honor in 1937 as the student in the University of Michigan graduating class who had best demonstrated proficiency in both scholarship and athletics. In addition to receiving six varsity letters in basketball and baseball, Gee was also a member of the Sphinx society at Michigan and of the Phi Kappa Sigma fraternity. He graduated in 1937 with a Bachelor of Arts degree from the education school.

== Professional baseball ==
=== Syracuse Chiefs (1937–1939) ===
After graduating from Michigan, Gee signed to play professional baseball with his hometown team – the Syracuse Chiefs of the International League. On August 3, 1937, he threw a two-hit shutout against the Toronto Maple Leafs. Gee appeared in 16 games for the Chiefs in 1937, compiling a 4–3 record and a 2.90 earned run average (ERA).

In April 1938, the Chiefs' new manager Jim Bottomley chose Gee as the team's opening day starting pitcher, making him the first Syracuse native to receive the honor. Gee allowed only six hits as the Chiefs defeated the Montreal Royals, 3–1, in front of an opening day crowd of 8,000 spectators. Gee appeared in 32 games for the Chiefs in 1938, 30 as a starter, and compiled a 17–11 record with a 2.71 ERA.

In 1939, Gee returned in even stronger form than 1938. He appeared in 35 games for the Chiefs, all but one as a starter, and compiled a record of 20–10 with a 3.11 ERA.

=== Pittsburgh Pirates (1939–1944) ===
==== Purchase by Pittsburgh ====
By the end of July 1939, Gee had a 16–4 record and had become one of the most sought-after pitchers in the minor leagues. Insiders opined that Gee was the best baseball player to come out of the University of Michigan since George Sisler.

On August 1, 1939, the Pittsburgh Pirates announced that they had purchased Gee from Syracuse and that he would report to the Pirates at the end of the International League season. In exchange for Gee, the Pirates paid the Chiefs $75,000 in cash and agreed to send four players to Syracuse. The $75,000 paid to the Chiefs was the highest price paid by the Pirates for a player until the purchase of Hank Greenberg in 1947. The purchase of Gee was called "the biggest deal made in the [International League] since Baltimore peddled Lefty Grove to the Philadelphia Athletics." Because of Gee's limited success in the major leagues, it has also been called "one of the biggest busts in Pirates history."

==== Tallest player in the major leagues ====
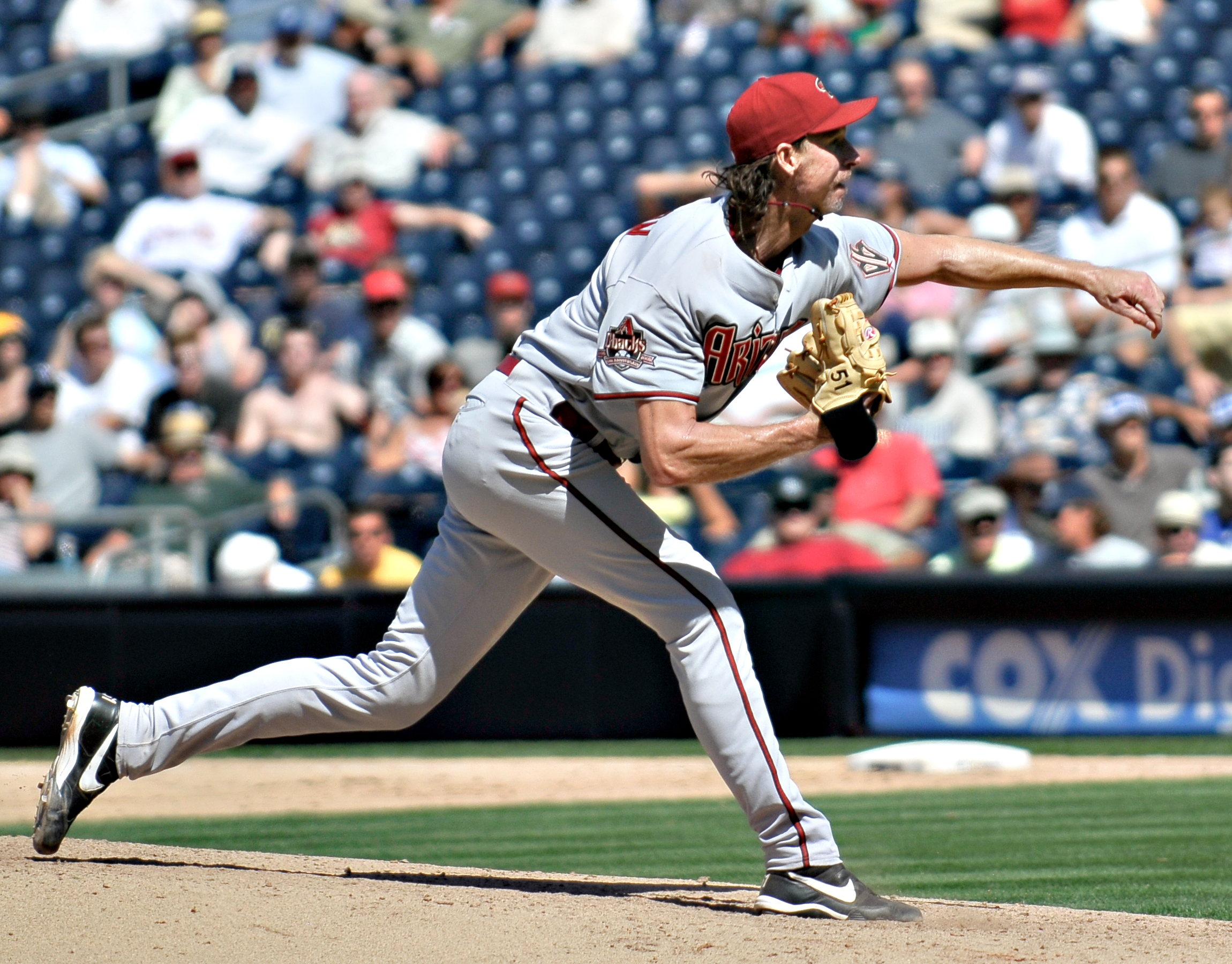
Randy Johnson supplanted Gee as the tallest player in major league history when he debuted with the Montreal Expos eight months after Gee's death.

At six feet, nine inches, Gee became the tallest player in organized baseball. Before Gee's debut, the tallest player to appear in the major leagues had been "Big Jim" Weaver, a six-foot, seven inch pitcher who debuted for the Washington Senators in 1928. Gee held the record as the tallest person ever to play Major League Baseball until Randy Johnson debuted for the Montreal Expos in September 1988.

==== 1939 season ====
Gee made his major league debut on September 17, 1939, against the Philadelphia Phillies. Gee held the Phillies to six hits, but the Pirates committed eight errors and lost by a 7–3 score. In his second game on September 21, 1939, Gee pitched a complete game and struck out 11 batters in a 6–4 victory over the Boston Braves. Gee appeared in three games for the Pirates in the last two weeks of the 1939 season, compiling a 1–2 record with a 4.12 ERA.

==== 1940 season ====
After Gee's showing in 1939, Pirates' manager Frankie Frisch looked for Gee to become one of the team's regular starters in 1940. However, Gee injured his throwing arm at the beginning of the Pirates' 1940 spring training camp and was bothered by a sore pitching arm for the remainder of the spring. Gee reportedly sustained the injury when he "opened up by throwing curves." He later recalled, "I guess I just threw too hard too soon."

Gee remained with the Pirates during the opening weeks of the regular season, but he did not appear in any games. In an attempt to treat the pain in Gee's arm, the Pirates reportedly "sent him to specialists all over the country." He even had two teeth removed "in the belief that this might help with his recovery." On May 9, 1940, the Pirates returned Gee to the Syracuse Chiefs with an option to recall him on 24 hours' notice. Gee's pitching arm did not improve in Syracuse, and on June 25, 1940, the Chiefs informed the Pirates that the option had been canceled. With no room on the major league roster, the Pirates placed Gee on the voluntarily retired list for a minimum of 60 days. At the time, Gee predicted that he would be ready to return to the Pirates when the 60-day voluntary retirement period lapsed.

In July 1940, the Pirates optioned Gee to the Albany Senators in the Eastern League. Gee refused to report to Albany and was placed on the ineligible list by Pirates. Gee said at the time that he was not ready to pitch and that it was unlikely he would be able to pitch again during the 1940 season. Instead of going to Albany, Gee went to the Vermont summer home of his college coach Ray Fisher.

==== 1941 season ====
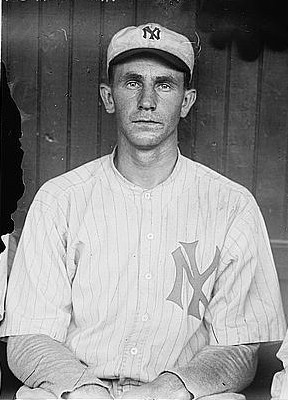
Michigan baseball coach Ray Fisher continued to mentor Gee during his professional baseball career.

In the weeks leading up to 1941 spring training, Gee traveled to Ann Arbor to train with Michigan's coach Fisher and "in an effort to recover his former ability and work the kinks out from his ailing arm." Gee told reporters, "I'm placing myself entirely under Fisher's directions.... He taught me all I know and he's the one who can straighten me out." He worked out daily with Fisher at the Yost Fieldhouse on the University of Michigan campus. In late January 1941, Fisher told the press: "All the soreness seems to be out. We don't know for sure until he starts bearing down next week, but Johnny should be a lot better pitcher this year. He's only 25 and should have a lot of good baseball ahead of him."

Gee reported to the Pirates at their San Bernardino, California, training camp in late February 1941. However, by late March, the Pirates optioned Gee to the Portland Beavers in the Pacific Coast League. Gee appeared in only two games for the Beavers, compiling a 1–0 record with a 4.50 ERA. The Beavers returned Gee to the Pirates on May 16, 1941, and the Pirates immediately optioned him to the Dallas Rebels in the Texas League. Gee was in Dallas for less than a week and did not appear in any games. On May 23, 1941, Gee left Dallas in a salary dispute. Gee reported that the Dallas team had offered him a contract at half the salary he had received in Portland. After leaving Dallas, Gee stopped in Ann Arbor to seek advice from Coach Fisher. While in Ann Arbor, Gee told reporters that "the whole trouble is with the Pirates over the matter of salary. I like Dallas."

In late June 1941, after Gee advised that he would probably remain out of baseball for the remainder of the season, the Dallas Rebels reassigned Gee to the Pirates.

In late July 1941, the Pirates again assigned Gee to the Albany Senators, Gee's third minor league team in two months. Gee wired the Pirates that he would agree to report to Albany.

Gee ultimately appeared in only three games for the Pirates in 1941, pitching seven innings and compiling a 0–2 record with a 6.14 ERA.

==== Retirement in 1942 ====
With the United States entering World War II after the attack on Pearl Harbor in December 1941, many of the best players in the major leagues were lost to military service. Gee was designated 4F and ineligible for military service due to his height. The United States military had a height limit of six feet, six inches at the time.

In 1942, Gee was assigned to the Toronto Maple Leafs in the International League. He appeared in five game for the Maple Leafs, pitching 34 innings and compiling a 2–2 record with a 4.50 ERA. In late June 1942, Gee was optioned to the Atlanta Crackers of the Southern Association. Gee refused to report to Atlanta and said, "My arm just isn't right." In early July 1942, Gee applied to Commissioner Kenesaw Mountain Landis for voluntary retirement, and his request was granted. Later that month, Gee accepted a position as a physical education teacher at Adams High School in Adams, New York.

==== 1943 season ====
In June 1943, Gee reported that his arm was finally in shape for him to return to pitching. His request for reinstatement was granted by Commissioner Landis, and he returned to the Pirates in mid-June.

After watching Gee throw in batting practice in mid-June, manager Frankie Frisch reported, "He certainly looks great." Gee joined the team in early July, and in his first start, he was replaced in the third inning after walking three batters to load the bases. On August 16, 1943, Gee pitched a complete game victory, allowing the Boston Braves to score only one run. In late August 1943, he got the win in a seven-inning relief appearance against the Chicago Cubs. In total, Gee appeared in 15 games for the 1943 Pirates, ten as a starter, and compiled a record of 4–4 with a 4.28 ERA. He lost his last three games by one-run margins.

==== 1944 season ====
In early March 1944, Gee signed a contract to return to the Pirates. At the time, he was teaching and coaching basketball and soccer in Groton, New York. He arrived at the Pirates' training camp in Muncie, Indiana, on March 18, 1944. He appeared in only four games for the 1944 Pirates, all as a relief pitcher, and had an ERA of 7.15.

=== New York Giants (1944–1946) ===
In June 1944, the New York Giants purchased Gee from the Pirates at the waiver price of $7,500. After undergoing treatment in New York for his throwing arm, Gee appeared in his first game for the Giants on July 1, 1944, retiring the side in a ninth inning as a relief pitcher against the Pirates. The New York Times reported that the Giants' "first glimpse of the altitudinous Johnny Gee" was encouraging. He pitched a total of 4 2/3 innings in four games for the 1944 Giants without allowing an earned run.

Gee reported to the Giants' camp on April 1, 1945. He reported to camp late because the Groton High School basketball team that he was coaching had advanced to tournament play. When he arrived at the Giants' camp in Lakewood, New Jersey, Gee told reporters that the soreness in his arm was gone, and he believed he would be a winner. Two weeks later, he gave up only one hit in three innings as a relief pitcher in a pre-season exhibition game. However, the soreness in his arm returned, and on June 9, 1945, Gee again announced that he was again retiring from the game. During the 1945 season, Gee appeared in only two games and pitched three innings for the Giants, allowing three earned runs for a 9.00 ERA.

In early June 1946, Gee notified Giants' manager Mel Ott that he was ready and willing to resume pitching. He reported that his arm was completely recovered and that he believed he could be successful in the major leagues. The Giants invited Gee back, and he made his first start in late July, a 2–1 win against the Cincinnati Reds. Gee pitched 8 2/3 innings, did not allow a run until the ninth inning, and went two-for-four as a batter. A wire service report on the game opened as follows:

Baseball fans throughout the nation rejoiced today in the successful comeback made by Johnny Gee, the tall man with the short name. No more will they call the six foot eight inch southpaw "the $75,000 lemon."

Five days later, Gee got his second consecutive win, pitching a complete game and holding the Reds to seven hits and two runs. After the game, the Associated Press reported that "the giant Syracusan has become one of the surprises of mid-season." In early August 1946, The Sporting News published a lengthy feature story about Gee's comeback. The article noted:

The six-foot-eight-inch southpaw retired last summer after trying to cure a sore arm for five years. But so determined was he to become a winning big leaguer that he reported to the Giants a month ago. Suddenly he disappeared, only to bob up again. Later he explained that before giving up a good school job in Waterloo, N.Y., he wanted to be sure he was okay, so he left the Giants to pitch a semi-pro game. Satisfied, he rejoined the team and on July 21 shut out the Reds for eight innings.

The victory over Cincinnati in late July proved to be Gee's final win as a major league pitcher. He appeared in his final major league game on September 26, 1946. During the 1946 season, Gee appeared in 13 games for the Giants (six as a starter), pitched 47 1/3 innings, and compiled a 2–4 record with a 3.99 ERA.

Gee is the second player mentioned in David Frishberg's 1969 baseball song "Van Lingle Mungo", the lyrics of which consist of names of major league players from the 1940s.

=== Minor leagues ===
Gee was a no-show at the Giants' 1947 spring training camp in Arizona. In February 1947, Gee stated that he intended to complete the school year as the physical education director at Waterloo High School. "Then, if satisfied with the Giant wage offer, he'll join the National League Club." Gee's refusal to quit his school teaching job and show up for spring training reportedly placed him "at odds with the Giants."

During the 1947 and 1948 seasons, Gee was not permitted to play professional baseball, as he had been classified as a holdout by the Giants. Accordingly, Gee played semi-professional baseball. In late June 1947, Gee was playing for a baseball team in Palmyra, New York. After a game in which he struck out 13 batters and allowed only three hits and one run, Gee noted that he planned to report to the Giants the following week. (No record has been found indicating that Gee did report to the Giants during the 1947 season.)

In June 1948, Gee was playing for the Homer Braves in the Southern Tier League. He threw a complete game shutout against the Ithaca Vets in early June, allowing only four hits. Later that month, Gee attempted a comeback with the Giants. Gee had been away from the major leagues for two years. He pitched during batting practice for the Giants before a game in Boston on June 30, 1948, and Giants manager Mel Ott continued to inspect his work for several days thereafter. Gee did not rejoin the Giants. He pitched a six-hit victory for the Homer Braves against Groton in his first game after returning from his tryout with the Giants. Several days later, he threw a one-hitter and struck out 11 batters against the Ithaca Vets. Ithaca's sole hit in the game was a ground ball off the third baseman's glove. In late July 1948, Gee was the winning pitcher in both games of a Sunday double header. Gee compiled a 19–2 record for Homer in 1948.

In March 1949, Gee signed a contract agreeing to return to the Homer Braves for the 1949 season. In August, Gee obtained a release from the Giants, allowing him to return to professional baseball after an absence of three years. He promptly signed with the Geneva Robins in the Class C Border League. After one season with Geneva, Gee left organized baseball for two years. Gee made a final comeback attempt in 1951 at age 35. In late May 1951, he signed with the Auburn Cayugas of the Class C Border League. He appeared in six games for Auburn, compiling a 4–2 record with a 2.49 ERA.

== Professional basketball (1941–1942, 1946–1948) ==
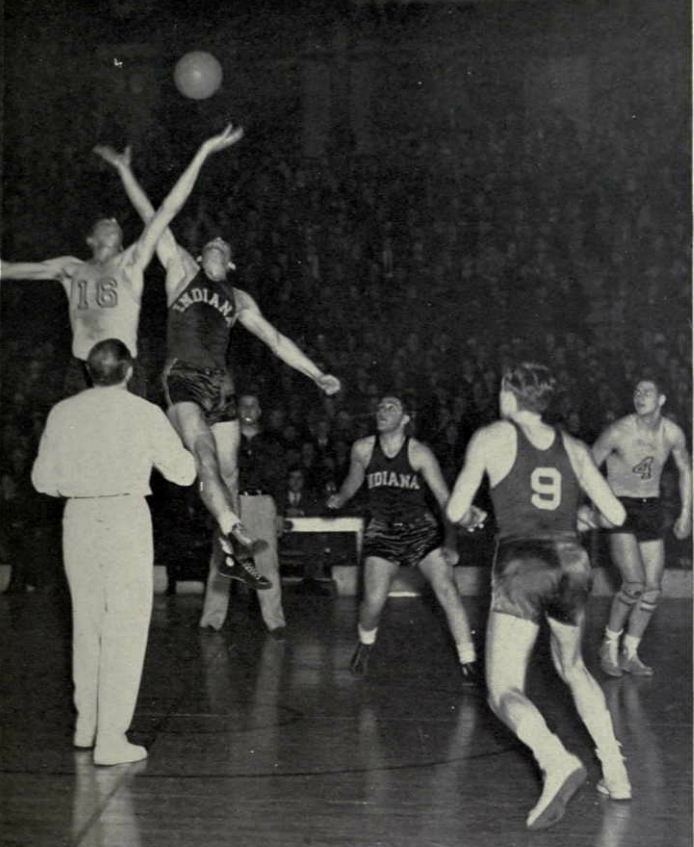
"Controlling The Tip – Gee way above Hosler to start rout of Indiana, 55 to 37." (From 1937 Michiganensian)

Gee played semi-professional basketball during the 1941–42 basketball season. He was the starting center for the Celtics in the Herald-Journal League.

In January 1946, a Syracuse newspaper reported that Turk Karam, manager of the Syracuse Stars basketball team, was hoping to sign Gee. At the time, Gee was a physical education instructor in Waterloo, New York, and reported to be "in the best of physical condition and ready for competition." In March 1946, Gee was reportedly playing with an All-Syracuse basketball team that was combined with Karam's Syracuse Stars. He also played for the Auburn All-Stars in a March 1946 games against the Harlem Globetrotters; Gee was the leading scorer in the game with 14 points.

Gee joined the Syracuse Nationals for the 1946–47 season, the team's inaugural season in the National Basketball League. While playing for the Nationals, Gee continued with his teaching job in Waterloo. Because of his obligations as a teacher, Gee was unable to travel with the team on most road trips and appeared only in home games. On November 14, 1946, Gee was the high scorer for the Nationals in the team's first victory, and first home game, in the National Basketball League. Gee scored 17 points, 10 in the second half, before he fouled out of the game. The Nationals won the game by a 67–64 score against the Youngstown Bears in front of 1,600 spectators in Syracuse.

By January 1947, the Stars had acquired a full-time center who could play on road trips, and Gee was no longer the starting center. However, he was reportedly "clicking" as a replacement. In March 1947, Joe Reichler wrote a nationally syndicated story for the Associated Press about the influx of Major League Baseball players into the newly formed professional basketball leagues. Reichler cited Gee, Howard Schultz, and Frankie Baumholtz as the first group to make the jump. He noted: "Another who appears to prefer basketball to baseball is Long Johnny Gee, the 6–9 New York Giants southpaw who has balked at signing the baseball club's terms and is content to star for the Nationals."

During the 1947–48 season, Gee played professional basketball for the Oneida Indians from Oneida, New York.

=== Basketball Official (1949–1950) ===
During the 1949–50 NBA season, Gee served as a game official. He officiated in a game between Syracuse and Baltimore in October 1949. He also played for the Oneida Indians and scored 19 points against the Syracuse Nationals in an exhibition game in late October 1949. He also played for the Elmira Knapps and scored 14 points in a January 1950 exhibition game against Syracuse.

== Family and later years ==
On August 29, 1942, Gee married Suzanne Corl of Maumee, Ohio. The two had met while both were students at the University of Michigan. They had two sons (John A. Gee III and Thomas R. Gee) and three daughters (Corlann, Nancy and Katherine).

In 1945, Gee became a teacher and athletic coach at Waterloo Central High School in Waterloo, New York. By 1951, he was the athletic director at the school. In July 1955, he was named the principal at Waterloo High School. He received a master's degree from Syracuse University in 1956. He also served as an official at high school and college sporting events.

In May 1960, Gee left his position in Waterloo to become the principal at Cortland High School in Cortland, New York. He served as the principal at Cortland High School until 1977. He was later employed as a code enforcement officer for the City of Cortland from 1980 to 1985.

Gee died at age 72 on January 23, 1988, in Cortland, New York. He was posthumously inducted into the Greater Syracuse Sports Hall of Fame in 1998.
