= 1936–37 Cincinnati Bearcats men's basketball team =

American college basketball season

1936–37 Cincinnati Bearcats men's basketball
- Conference: Buckeye Athletic Association
- Record: 9–10 (6–4 BAA)
- Head coach: Tay Brown (4th season)
- Home arena: Schmidlapp Gymnasium

The 1936–37 Cincinnati Bearcats men's basketball team represented the University of Cincinnati during the 1936–37 NCAA men's basketball season. The head coach was Tay Brown, coaching his fourth season with the Bearcats. The team finished with an overall record of 9–10.

== Schedule ==
Date time, TV	Opponent	Result	Record	Site city, state
December 4	at Indiana	L 13–46	0–1	The Fieldhouse; Bloomington, IN
December 12	Wilmington	W 41–21	1–1	Schmidlapp Gymnasium; Cincinnati, OH
December 16	Indianapolis	L 28–32	1–2	Schmidlapp Gymnasium; Cincinnati, OH
December 18	at Mount Union	L 30–33	1–3	Alliance, OH
December 19	at Western Reserve	L 28–34	1–4	
January 2	Wittenberg	W 38–27	2–4	Schmidlapp Gymnasium; Cincinnati, OH
January 5	at Ohio	L 34–39	2–5	Men's Gymnasium; Athens, OH
January 9	at Marshall	L 33–38	2–6	Huntington, WV
January 12	Miami (OH)	W 37–25	3–6	Schmidlapp Gymnasium; Cincinnati, OH
January 15	Toledo	L 34–47	3–7	Schmidlapp Gymnasium; Cincinnati, OH
February 9	at Indianapolis	L 25–33	3–8	Indianapolis, IN
February 13	Marshall	L 53–56	3–9	Schmidlapp Gymnasium; Cincinnati, OH
February 16	at Dayton	W 35–32	4–9	Montgomery Fair County Grounds Coliseum; Dayton, OH
February 20	Western Reserve	W 37–32	5–9	Schmidlapp Gymnasium; Cincinnati, OH
February 22	at Ohio Wesleyan	W 28–26	6–9	Delaware, OH
February 25	Ohio Wesleyan	W 29–24	7–9	Schmidlapp Gymnasium; Cincinnati, OH
February 28	at Miami (OH)	W 40–32	8–9	Oxford, OH
March 1	Dayton	W 45–29	9–9	Schmidlapp Gymnasium; Cincinnati, OH
March 3	Ohio	L 26–34	9–10	Schmidlapp Gymnasium; Cincinnati, OH
*Non-conference game. (#) Tournament seedings in parentheses.
