= 1937 SEC men's basketball tournament =

- Classification: Division I
- Teams: 8
- Site: Alumni Memorial Gym; Knoxville, Tennessee
- Champions: Kentucky (2nd title)
- Winning coach: Adolph Rupp (2nd title)

1936–37 Southeastern Conference men's basketball standings
	Conf.				Overall
Team	W		L	PCT	W		L	PCT
Georgia Tech	10	–	0	1.000	13	–	2	.867
Tennessee	7	–	1	.875	17	–	5	.773
Ole Miss	7	–	3	.700	20	–	6	.769
Auburn	7	–	4	.636	11	–	4	.733
Kentucky †	5	–	3	.625	17	–	5	.773
Georgia	5	–	3	.625	10	–	6	.625
LSU	7	–	6	.538	13	–	7	.650
Alabama	7	–	8	.467	11	–	10	.524
Mississippi State	6	–	7	.462	15	–	9	.625
Tulane	4	–	8	.333	6	–	8	.429
Vanderbilt	3	–	7	.300	6	–	10	.375
Florida	1	–	9	.100	5	–	13	.278
Sewanee	0	–	10	.000	1	–	15	.063
† Regular-season championship and SEC Tournament winner

The 1937 Southeastern Conference men's basketball tournament took place on February 26–March 1, 1937, in Knoxville, Tennessee at Alumni Memorial Gym. It was the fourth SEC basketball tournament.

Kentucky won the tournament by beating Tennessee in the championship game.

== Bracket ==
Quarterfinals
Georgia Tech	43
Mississippi State	30
Kentucky	57
LSU	37
Alabama	35
Ole Miss	34
Tennessee	42
Georgia	11

Semifinals
Georgia Tech	30
Kentucky	40
Alabama	25
Tennessee	42

Finals
Kentucky	39
Tennessee	25
