= 1936–37 Wisconsin Badgers men's basketball team =

American college basketball season

1936–37 Wisconsin Badgers men's basketball
- Conference: Big Ten Conference
- Record: 8–12 (3–9 Big Ten)
- Head coach: Harold E. Foster
- Home arena: UW Fieldhouse

1936–37 Big Ten Conference men's basketball standings
	Conf.				Overall
Team	W		L	PCT	W		L	PCT
Illinois	10	–	2	.833	14	–	4	.778
Minnesota	10	–	2	.833	14	–	6	.700
Michigan	9	–	3	.750	16	–	4	.800
Purdue	8	–	4	.667	15	–	5	.750
Ohio State	7	–	5	.583	13	–	7	.650
Indiana	6	–	6	.500	13	–	7	.650
Northwestern	4	–	8	.333	11	–	9	.550
Iowa	3	–	9	.250	11	–	9	.550
Wisconsin	3	–	9	.250	8	–	12	.400
Chicago	0	–	12	.000	4	–	16	.200

The 1936–37 Wisconsin Badgers men's basketball team represented University of Wisconsin–Madison. The head coach was Harold E. Foster, coaching his third season with the Badgers. The team played their home games at the UW Fieldhouse in Madison, Wisconsin and was a member of the Big Ten Conference.

== Schedule ==
Date time, TV	Rank^{#}	Opponent^{#}	Result	Record	Site city, state
Regular Season
12/04/1936*		Ball State	W 38–33	1–0	UW Fieldhouse; Madison, Wisconsin
12/07/1936*		North Dakota	W 42–25	2–0	UW Fieldhouse; Madison, Wisconsin
12/12/1936*		Marquette	W 29–21	3–0	UW Fieldhouse; Madison, Wisconsin
12/19/1936*		at Marquette	W 35–29	4–0	Marquette Gymnasium; Milwaukee
12/21/1936*		at Pittsburgh	L 30–41	4–1	Pitt Pavilion; Pittsburgh
12/23/1936*		at Butler	L 23–43	4–2	Butler Fieldhouse; Indianapolis
12/30/1936*		DePaul	L 17–33	4–3	UW Fieldhouse; Madison, Wisconsin
1/04/1937		at Purdue	L 30–43	4–4 (0–1)	Lafayette Jefferson HS Gymnasium; Lafayette, Indiana
1/09/1937		Illinois	L 28–31	4–5 (0–2)	UW Fieldhouse; Madison, Wisconsin
1/11/1937		at Ohio State	L 22–28	4–6 (0–3)	Ohio Expo Center Coliseum; Columbus, Ohio
1/16/1937		Michigan	L 31–43	4–7 (0–4)	UW Fieldhouse; Madison, Wisconsin
1/18/1937		Iowa	W 29–23	5–7 (1–4)	UW Fieldhouse; Madison, Wisconsin
2/06/1937*		Michigan State	W 22–17	6–7	UW Fieldhouse; Madison, Wisconsin
2/08/1937		Ohio State	W 35–33 ^{OT}	7–7 (2–4)	UW Fieldhouse; Madison, Wisconsin
2/13/1937		Minnesota	L 32–37	7–8 (2–5)	UW Fieldhouse; Madison, Wisconsin
2/20/1937		at Iowa	L 35–43	7–9 (2–6)	Iowa Field House; Iowa City, IA
2/22/1937		at Illinois	L 31–48	7–10 (2–7)	Huff Hall; Champaign, Illinois
2/27/1937		at Minnesota	L 17–30	7–11 (2–8)	Minnesota Field House; Minneapolis
3/01/1937		Purdue	W 46–43	8–11 (3–8)	UW Fieldhouse; Madison, Wisconsin
3/06/1937		at Michigan	L 27–41	8–12 (3–9)	Yost Field House; Ann Arbor, Michigan
*Non-conference game. ^{#}Rankings from AP Poll. (#) Tournament seedings in parentheses.
