= 1936–37 Idaho Vandals men's basketball team =

American college basketball season

1936–37 Idaho Vandals men's basketball
- Conference: Pacific Coast Conference
- Record: 8–19 (2–14 PCC)
- Head coach: Forrest Twogood (1st season)
- Home arena: Memorial Gymnasium

1936–37 Pacific Coast Conference men's basketball standings
| | Conf. | | | | Overall |
| Team | W | | L | PCT | W | | L | PCT |
|---|---|---|---|---|---|---|---|---|
North
| Washington State | 11 | – | 5 | .688 | 24 | – | 8 | .750 |
| Oregon | 11 | – | 5 | .688 | 20 | – | 9 | .690 |
| Washington | 11 | – | 5 | .688 | 15 | – | 11 | .577 |
| Oregon State | 5 | – | 11 | .313 | 11 | – | 15 | .423 |
| Idaho | 2 | – | 14 | .125 | 8 | – | 19 | .296 |
South
| Stanford † | 10 | – | 2 | .833 | 25 | – | 2 | .926 |
| USC | 8 | – | 4 | .667 | 19 | – | 6 | .760 |
| California | 4 | – | 8 | .333 | 17 | – | 10 | .630 |
| UCLA | 2 | – | 10 | .167 | 6 | – | 13 | .316 |
† Conference playoff series winner

The 1936–37 Idaho Vandals men's basketball team represented the University of Idaho during the 1936–37 NCAA college basketball season. Members of the Pacific Coast Conference, the Vandals were led by first-year head coach Forrest Twogood and played their home games on campus at Memorial Gymnasium in Moscow, Idaho.

The Vandals were 8–19 overall and 2–14 in conference play.

Notable players were dual-sport stars Steve Belko and Lyle Smith, both future coaches and administrators.
