= 1936–37 Illinois Fighting Illini men's basketball team =

American college basketball season

1936–37 Illinois Fighting Illini men's basketball

Big Ten Conference champions
- Conference: Big Ten Conference
- Record: 14–4 (10-2 Big Ten)
- Head coach: Douglas Mills (1st season)
- Assistant coach: Wally Roettger (2nd season)
- Captain: Robert Riegel
- Home arena: Huff Hall

1936–37 Big Ten Conference men's basketball standings
	Conf.				Overall
Team	W		L	PCT	W		L	PCT
Illinois	10	–	2	.833	14	–	4	.778
Minnesota	10	–	2	.833	14	–	6	.700
Michigan	9	–	3	.750	16	–	4	.800
Purdue	8	–	4	.667	15	–	5	.750
Ohio State	7	–	5	.583	13	–	7	.650
Indiana	6	–	6	.500	13	–	7	.650
Northwestern	4	–	8	.333	11	–	9	.550
Iowa	3	–	9	.250	11	–	9	.550
Wisconsin	3	–	9	.250	8	–	12	.400
Chicago	0	–	12	.000	4	–	16	.200

The 1936–37 Illinois Fighting Illini men's basketball team represented the University of Illinois.

== Regular season ==
New head coach Doug Mills took over the Illinois Fighting Illini men's basketball team for the 1936–37 season replacing Craig Ruby. Mills was a player for the Illini from 1927 to 1930 and served as the assistant coach for the 1935–36 season. Mills' service toward the University of Illinois would continue until 1947 as head coach and until 1966 as athletic director. Along with future head coach Harry Combes, the Illini returned 7 lettermen from a team that had finished in a third place tie in the Big Ten the year before. Even though they lost 2 home games during conference play, the Illini finished the season in a tie for the conference championship with a record of 10 wins and 2 losses. The team finished the season with an overall record of 14 wins 4 losses. Along with Combes, the Illini also featured future major league baseball hall of fame shortstop and manager, Lou Boudreau. The starting lineup included captain Robert Riegel at the center position, Boudreau and Combes at forward and Wilbur Henry, James Vopicka and Tom Nisbet at guard. Following that season, the men's gymnasium got a new name, George Huff Gymnasium, after former Illinois athletic director George Huff, who died on October 1, 1936. During the championship season, Boudreau led the team in scoring with 8.7 points per game.

=== Roster ===
"1936–37 Fighting Illini men's basketball team"

1936–37 Illinois Fighting Illini men's basketball team
Players
Coaches

Pos.	#	Name	Height	Weight	Year	Hometown
F	3	Loren Grabb	—	—	So	Decatur, Illinois
C	4	Robert Riegel (C)	—	—	Sr	Tolono, Illinois
F	5	Carter Cooley	—	—	So	Chicago, Illinois
G	6	Wilbur Henry	—	—	Sr	North Hollywood, California
G	7	James Vopicka	—	—	Sr	Berwyn, Illinois
F	8	Harry Lasater Jr.	—	—	Fr	Fairfield, Illinois
F	10	Harold Swanson	—	—	Sr	Chicago Heights, Illinois
F	11	Byron Blout	—	—	Sr	Salinas, California
G	15	George Wardley	—	—	So	Gary, Indiana
F	16	Charles Farrington	—	—	Jr	Urbana, Illinois
G	17	Harry Combes	—	—	Sr	Champaign, Illinois
G	18	Tom Nisbet	—	—	So	Chicago, Illinois
F	20	Frank Schack	—	—	So	Decatur, Illinois
F	21	Lou Boudreau	—	—	So	Harvey, Illinois
G	28	Edward Yeaton	—	—	Jr	Elkhorn, Wisconsin
F	29	Albert Billings	—	—	So	Elgin, Illinois
G	30	Robert Castelo	—	—	So	Champaign, Illinois

Head coach

- Douglas Mills (University of Illinois) (1st year)

Assistant coach(es)

- Wally Roettger (University of Illinois) (2nd year)

Legend

- (C) Team captain
- (S) Suspended
- (I) Ineligible
- (W) Walk-on
- Injured
- Current redshirt

Roster

== Schedule ==
Date time, TV	Rank^{#}	Opponent^{#}	Result	Record	Site (attendance) city, state
Non-Conference regular season
12/8/1936*		Carroll	W 51–34	1–0	Huff Hall (6,500); Champaign, IL
12/12/1936*		Depauw	W 44–24	2–0	Huff Hall (6,000); Champaign, IL
12/19/1936*		Notre Dame	W 44–29	3–0	Huff Hall (7,000); Champaign, IL
12/23/1936*		at DePaul	L 25–31	3–1	DePaul Auditorium (6,000); Chicago, IL
12/30/1936*		at Bradley	W 43–33	4–1	Hewitt Gymnasium (3,800); Peoria, IL
Big Ten regular season
1/4/1937		Northwestern; Rivalry	L 38–47	4–2 (0–1)	Huff Hall (7,328); Champaign, IL
1/9/1937		at Wisconsin	W 31–28	5–2 (1–1)	Wisconsin Field House (6,700); Madison, WI
1/11/1937		Indiana; Rivalry	W 40–31	6–2 (2–1)	Huff Hall (7,000); Champaign, IL
1/16/1937		Iowa; Rivalry	W 42–28	7–2 (3–1)	Huff Hall (6,810); Champaign, IL
1/18/1937		at Purdue	W 38–37	8–2 (4–1)	Jefferson High School (5,600); West Lafayette, IN
1/23/1937		University of Chicago	W 28–23	9–2 (5–1)	Huff Hall (6,000); Champaign, IL
2/6/1937*		at Notre Dame	L 33–41	9–3	Notre Dame Fieldhouse (–); Notre Dame, IN
2/13/1937		at University of Chicago	W 34–26	10–3 (6–1)	Henry Crown Field House (3,000); Chicago, IL
2/15/1937		Purdue	L 34–61	10–4 (6–2)	Huff Hall (7,600); Champaign, IL
2/20/1937		at Indiana; Rivalry	W 42–25	11–4 (7–2)	IU Fieldhouse (5,000); Bloomington, IN
2/22/1937		Wisconsin	W 48–31	12–4 (8–2)	Huff Hall (9,000); Champaign, IL
2/27/1937		at Iowa; Rivalry	W 40–29	13–4 (9–2)	Iowa Field House (9,000); Iowa City, IA
3/6/1937		at Northwestern; Rivalry	W 32–26	14–4 (10–2)	Patten Gymnasium (6,000); Evanston, IL
*Non-conference game. ^{#}Rankings from AP Poll. (#) Tournament seedings in parentheses. All times are in Central Time.

== Awards and honors ==
- Harry Combes
  - Omaha World Newspaper 2nd team All-American
