= 1936–37 Washington State Cougars men's basketball team =

American college basketball season

1936–37 Washington State Cougars men's basketball

PCC Northern Division Champions
- Conference: Pacific Coast Conference
- Record: 24–8 (11–5 PCC)
- Head coach: Jack Friel (9th season)
- Home arena: WSC Gymnasium

1936–37 Pacific Coast Conference men's basketball standings
	Conf.				Overall
Team	W		L	PCT	W		L	PCT
North
Washington State	11	–	5	.688	24	–	8	.750
Oregon	11	–	5	.688	20	–	9	.690
Washington	11	–	5	.688	15	–	11	.577
Oregon State	5	–	11	.313	11	–	15	.423
Idaho	2	–	14	.125	8	–	19	.296
South
Stanford †	10	–	2	.833	25	–	2	.926
USC	8	–	4	.667	19	–	6	.760
California	4	–	8	.333	17	–	10	.630
UCLA	2	–	10	.167	6	–	13	.316
† Conference playoff series winner

The 1936–37 Washington State Cougars men's basketball team represented Washington State College for the 1936–37 college basketball season. Led by ninth-year head coach Jack Friel, the Cougars were members of the Pacific Coast Conference and played their home games on campus at WSC Gymnasium in Pullman, Washington.

The Cougars were 22–6 overall in the regular season and 11–5 in conference play, in a three-way tie for first place in the Northern division. In the three-way playoff, Washington State defeated rival Washington in Seattle, and defeated Oregon eight nights later in Pullman to win their first division title.

The best-of-three conference playoff series was held in Pullman against Southern division winner Stanford; the Cougars lost two close games.

The National Invitation Tournament (NIT) debuted the next year, and the NCAA tournament in 1939.

== Postseason results ==
Date time, TV	Opponent	Result	Record	Site (attendance) city, state
PCC Northern Division Playoff
Fri, March 12	at Washington; First round	W 36–33	23–6	UW Pavilion; Seattle, Washington
Sat, March 20	Oregon; Final	W 42–25	24–6	WSC Gymnasium; Pullman, Washington
Pacific Coast Conference Playoff Series
Fri, March 26	Stanford; Game One	L 28–31	24–7	WSC Gymnasium; Pullman, Washington
Sat, March 27	Stanford; Game Two	L 40–41	24–8	WSC Gymnasium; Pullman, Washington
*Non-conference game. (#) Tournament seedings in parentheses. All times are in Pacific time.
