= 1936–37 Washington Huskies men's basketball team =

American college basketball season

1936–37 Washington Huskies men's basketball
- Conference: Pacific Coast Conference
- Record: 15–11 (11–5 PCC)
- Head coach: Hec Edmundson (17th season)
- Captain: Charles Wagner
- Home arena: UW Pavilion

1936–37 Pacific Coast Conference men's basketball standings
	Conf.				Overall
Team	W		L	PCT	W		L	PCT
North
Washington State	11	–	5	.688	24	–	8	.750
Oregon	11	–	5	.688	20	–	9	.690
Washington	11	–	5	.688	15	–	11	.577
Oregon State	5	–	11	.313	11	–	15	.423
Idaho	2	–	14	.125	8	–	19	.296
South
Stanford †	10	–	2	.833	25	–	2	.926
USC	8	–	4	.667	19	–	6	.760
California	4	–	8	.333	17	–	10	.630
UCLA	2	–	10	.167	6	–	13	.316
† Conference playoff series winner

The 1936–37 Washington Huskies men's basketball team represented the University of Washington for the 1936–37 NCAA college basketball season. Led by seventeenth-year head coach Hec Edmundson, the Huskies were members of the Pacific Coast Conference and played their home games on campus at the UW Pavilion in Seattle, Washington.

The Huskies were 15–10 overall in the regular season and 11–5 in conference play; tied for first in the Northern division. In the three-way playoff, Washington lost at home to rival Washington State, who went on to defeat Oregon in Pullman.

The National Invitation Tournament (NIT) debuted the next year, and the NCAA tournament in 1939.

== Postseason result ==
Date time, TV	Opponent	Result	Record	Site (attendance) city, state
PCC Northern Division Playoff
Fri, March 12	Washington State; First round	L 33–36	15–11	UW Pavilion; Seattle, Washington
*Non-conference game. (#) Tournament seedings in parentheses. All times are in Pacific time.
