= 1936–37 La Salle Explorers men's basketball team =

American college basketball season

1936–37 La Salle Explorers men's basketball
- Conference: Independent
- Record: 12–7
- Head coach: Leonard Tanseer (4th season)
- Captain: Frank Hoerst
- Home arena: Wister Hall

The 1936–37 La Salle Explorers men's basketball team represented La Salle University during the 1936–37 NCAA men's basketball season. The head coach was Leonard Tanseer, coaching the explorers in his fourth season. The team finished with an overall record of 12–7.

== Schedule ==
Date time, TV	Opponent	Result	Record	Site city, state
Dec 2, 1936*	Phila. Pharmacy	W 41–15	1–0	Wister Hall; Philadelphia, PA
Dec. 4, 1936*	Alumni	W 42–22	2–0	Wister Hall; Philadelphia, PA
Dec 9, 1936	Pennsylvania	L 25–26	2–1	Wister Hall; Philadelphia, PA
Dec. 18, 1936	Roanoke	W 32–29	3–1	Wister Hall; Philadelphia, PA
Dec. 21, 1936*	Temple	W 37–31 ^{ot}	4–1	Wister Hall; Philadelphia, PA
Dec. 28, 1936	at St. Joseph's	L 20–25	4–2	West Chester, PA
Jan 11, 1937	at Long Island	L 30–34 ^{ot}	4–3	Brooklyn, NY
Jan. 16, 1937	Catholic	W 24–20	5–3	Wister Hall; Philadelphia, PA
Jan. 20, 1937*	Rider	W 34–31	6–3	Wister Hall; Philadelphia, PA
Jan. 27, 1937	P.M.C.	W 51–34	7–3	Wister Hall; Philadelphia, PA
Jan. 30, 1937	Providence	W 47–36	8–3	Wister Hall; Philadelphia, PA
Feb. 2, 1937	at West Chester	W 39–24	9–3	West Chester, PA
Feb. 6, 1937	St. Francis (NY)	W 31–25	10–3	Wister Hall; Philadelphia, PA
Feb. 10, 1937	P.M.C.	W 32–21	11–3	Wister Hall; Philadelphia, PA
Feb. 12, 1937	at Scranton	L 25–31	11–4	Scranton, PA
Feb. 16, 1937*	Saint Joseph's	L 25–28 ^{ot}	11–5	Wister Hall; Philadelphia, PA
Feb. 19, 1937	at Catholic	L 35–36	11–6	Washington, D.C.
Feb. 24, 1937	West Chester	L 27–28 ^{2ot}	11–7	Wister Hall; Philadelphia, PA
Feb. 26, 1937*	Scranton	W 35–32	12–7	Wister Hall; Philadelphia, PA
*Non-conference game. (#) Tournament seedings in parentheses.
