= John Townsend (basketball) =

American basketball player 1916–2001)

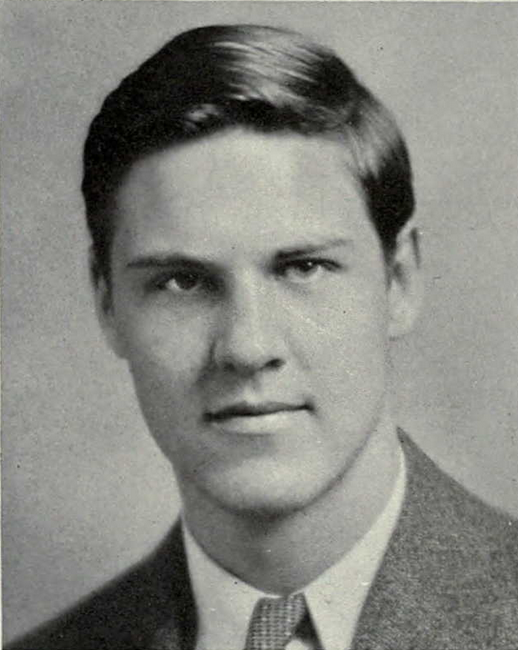
- Townsend from 1938 Michiganensian

Personal information
- Born: September 20, 1916 Indianapolis, Indiana, U.S.
- Died: December 4, 2001 (aged 85) Indianapolis, Indiana, U.S.
- Listed height: 6 ft 4 in (1.93 m)
- Listed weight: 208 lb (94 kg)

Career information
- High school: Arsenal Tech (Indianapolis, Indiana)
- College: Michigan (1935–1938)
- Playing career: 1938–1942
- Position: Forward / center

Career history
- 1938–1939: Hammond Ciesar All-Americans
- 1939–1940: Rochester Royals
- 1940–1941: Michigan All-Stars
- 1941: Toledo
- 1941–1942: Indianapolis Kautskys
- 1942: Oshkosh All-Stars
- 1942: Toledo Jim White Chevrolets

Career highlights
- First-team All-American – Converse (1938); 3× First-team All-Big Ten (1936–1938)

John Frederick "Jake" Townsend Sr. (September 20, 1916 – December 4, 2001) was an American basketball forward and center. He was an All-Big Ten player for the University of Michigan from 1935 to 1938. In 1938, he was named an All-American. He later played professional basketball for the Indianapolis Kautskys, Oshkosh All-Stars and Rochester Royals.

== High school basketball in Indiana ==
A native of Indiana, Townsend played for Arsenal Technical High School in Indianapolis. He led Arsenal Tech to the state finals in 1934, losing to Logansport. He was the leading scorer in the State Finals and was named All-State in basketball in Indiana twice and won the Dyer Medal, Indianapolis' top athletic award.

== University of Michigan ==
He played collegiately for the University of Michigan from 1936 to 1938. Townsend was named to the All-Big Ten team and led Michigan in scoring each year from 1936 to 1938. Considered the greatest Michigan basketball player in the era before Cazzie Russell, Townsend was 6 feet 4 inches (1.93 m) tall.

Known as the "Houdini of the Hardwood", Townsend scored 108 points in 1936 and was the only sophomore selected for the All-Big Ten team. The Associated Press chose Townsend as the All-Big Ten center in 1936 even though he played regularly at forward throughout the season. He was joined on the team by his older brother, Earl Townsend, who was the team captain. Earl had earlier led DePauw University to the 1934 Indiana Intercollegiate Conference title before transferring to Michigan.

In 1937, Townsend was again selected on the All-Big Ten team and finished second in conference in scoring. He had 40 field goals and made 43 out of 59 free throws for 123 points. Described by the Associated Press as "the great Wolverine ball-handler", he was "generally credited with being the best ball handler in the Big Ten."

In 12 games in 1938, Townsend had 45 field goals, converted 45 of 64 free throws, and finished fourth in the conference with 135 points. He was named an All-Big Ten player by both the United Press and the Associated Press for the third straight year. The United Press noted that Townsend was a unanimous choice for the second consecutive year. Though Purdue's Jewell Young was the Big Ten scoring leader in 1938, Townsend excelled as a scorer, rebounder and ball-handler. The United Press said: "It was Townsend's third year on the all-star team. He won his first recognition as a center, twice more as a forward. Players, especially, conceded Townsend was the greatest all-around man in the conference." The Associated Press said: "John (Jake) Townsend of Michigan won the center assignment by a big margin and in 'making' the team for the third consecutive year, accomplished a rare feat in Big Ten basketball. Rated as the greatest player in Michigan hardwood history, Townsend received first place votes, either at forward or center, from nine coaches. The other one picked him for the second five."

In 1938, he became the fourth consensus All-American in school history. Townsend also competed for Michigan in the shot put and discus. He was ranked fifth in the country in the discus. He earned five varsity letters at Michigan – three in basketball and two in track.

== Professional ball ==
Immediately after graduating, Townsend played baseball in 1938 in the Bush-Feezle State League for the Indianapolis team. The Kokomo Tribune noted in late August: "The Indianapolis aggregation is led by Johnny Townsend, former Technical high basketball star and an All-American cage player at The University of Michigan. Latest statistics ... show Townsend, a center fielder, is the loop's leading slugger. Townsend showed his prowess with the war club Wednesday when he tripled with the bags loaded to defeat the Muncie Acme-Lees team, 6-4."

In October 1938, Ed Ciesar, owner of the Hammond Ciesers announced he had signed Townsend to a professional basketball contract. Townsend played professional basketball in the NBL as a member of the Indianapolis Kautskys, Oshkosh All-Stars and Rochester Royals.

== Later years ==
Townsend later became a lawyer in Indianapolis. He also officiated basketball games in the 1940s for the Big Ten Conference, as well as four Indiana–Kentucky all-star games. He later worked as a broadcaster and coach.

== Honors and awards ==
He was inducted into the Indiana Basketball Hall of Fame in 1972; the 11th class to be honored; in 1980 he was named to the University of Michigan Athletic Hall of Honor as part of the third induction class. Only two basketball players, Cazzie Russell and Rudy Tomjanovich were inducted into the Hall of Honor before Townsend. In 2000, The Sporting News picked Townsend as a member of its Michigan all-time basketball team; he was one of only two players from before 1974 named to the team.

== Family ==
Townsend's grandson, Eric Montross (1971–2023), played basketball at the University of North Carolina and in the NBA.

== Career statistics ==
Legend
| GP | Games played | FGM | Field goals made |
| FTM | Free throws made | FTA | Free throws attempted |
| FT% | Free throw percentage | PTS | Total points |
| PPG | Points per game | **Bold** | Career high |

=== NBL ===
==== Regular season ====
| Year | Team | GP | FGM | FTM | PTS | PPG |
|---|---|---|---|---|---|---|
| 1938–39 | Hammond | 5 | 14 | 15 | 43 | **8.6** |
| 1941–42 | Indianapolis | **22** | **53** | **63** | **169** | 7.7 |
| 1942–43 | Toledo | 2 | 6 | 4 | 16 | 8.0 |
| 1942–43 | Oshkosh | 5 | 4 | 10 | 18 | 3.6 |
| Career | | 34 | 77 | 92 | 246 | 7.2 |

==== Playoffs ====
| Year | Team | GP | FGM | FTM | PTS | PPG |
|---|---|---|---|---|---|---|
| 1941–42 | Indianapolis | 2 | 6 | 11 | 23 | 11.5 |

== See also ==
- List of second-generation NBA players
