= 1936–37 Indiana Hoosiers men's basketball team =

American college basketball season

1936–37 Indiana Hoosiers men's basketball
- Conference: Big Ten Conference
- Record: 13–7 (6–6 Big Ten)
- Head coach: Everett Dean (13th season)
- Captains: Ken Gunning; Vern Huffman
- Home arena: The Fieldhouse

1936–37 Big Ten Conference men's basketball standings
	Conf.				Overall
Team	W		L	PCT	W		L	PCT
Illinois	10	–	2	.833	14	–	4	.778
Minnesota	10	–	2	.833	14	–	6	.700
Michigan	9	–	3	.750	16	–	4	.800
Purdue	8	–	4	.667	15	–	5	.750
Ohio State	7	–	5	.583	13	–	7	.650
Indiana	6	–	6	.500	13	–	7	.650
Northwestern	4	–	8	.333	11	–	9	.550
Iowa	3	–	9	.250	11	–	9	.550
Wisconsin	3	–	9	.250	8	–	12	.400
Chicago	0	–	12	.000	4	–	16	.200

The 1936–37 Indiana Hoosiers men's basketball team represented Indiana University. Their head coach was Everett Dean, who was in his 13th year. The team played its home games in The Fieldhouse in Bloomington, Indiana, and was a member of the Big Ten Conference.

The Hoosiers finished the regular season with an overall record of 13–7 and a conference record of 6–6, finishing 6th in the Big Ten Conference.

== Roster ==
No.	Name	Position	Ht.	Year	Hometown
3	Ken Gunning	F	5–11	Sr.	Shelbyville, Indiana
4	William Johnson	G	6–1	So.	Jeffersonville, Indiana
5	Vern Huffman	G	6–2	Sr.	New Castle, Indiana
6	Roger Ratliff	C/G	6–3	Jr.	Mooresville, Indiana
8	Joseph Platt	G	5–11	Jr.	Young America, Indiana
8	Raymond Guard	G	6–1	So.	Chalmers, Indiana
9	Bob Etnire	G/F	5–11	Sr.	Logansport, Indiana
10	Willis Hosler	C	6–3	Sr.	Huntington, Indiana
11	Ralph Dorsey	F	6–1	So.	Horse Cave, Kentucky
12	James Birr	C	6–3	Jr.	Indianapolis
13	William Squier	F	6–1	So.	Richmond, Indiana
14	Fred Fechtman	C	6–8	Sr.	Indianapolis, Indiana
15	Charles Mendel	G	6–3	Jr.	Bourbon, Indiana
16	Ernie Andres	G	6–1	So.	Jeffersonville, Indiana
17	Willie Silberstein	F	5–8	Jr.	Brooklyn, New York
20	Lyman Abbot	G	5–9	Jr.	Martinsville, Indiana
N/A	James Menefee	C	6–3	So.	Fort Wayne, Indiana
N/A	Richard White	F	6–1	So.	Lebanon, Indiana

== Schedule/results ==
Date time, TV	Rank^{#}	Opponent^{#}	Result	Record	Site city, state
Regular season
12/4/1936*		Cincinnati	W 46–13	1–0	The Fieldhouse; Bloomington, Indiana
12/12/1936*		Miami (OH)	W 43–13	2–0	The Fieldhouse; Bloomington, Indiana
12/14/1936*		Kansas State	W 60–33	3–0	The Fieldhouse; Bloomington, Indiana
12/19/1936*		at Manhattan	W 42–34	4–0	New York City
12/21/1936*		at Villanova	W 43–28	5–0	Villanova Field House; Villanova, Pennsylvania
1/1/1937*		at Butler	W 61–27	6–0	Butler Fieldhouse; Indianapolis
1/4/1937		Iowa	W 28–24	7–0 (1–0)	The Fieldhouse; Bloomington, Indiana
1/9/1937		at Chicago	W 46–26	8–0 (2–0)	Henry Crown Field House; Chicago
1/11/1937		at Illinois; Rivalry	L 31–40	8–1 (2–1)	Huff Hall; Champaign, Illinois
1/16/1937		Purdue; Rivalry	L 30–41	8–2 (2–2)	The Fieldhouse; Bloomington, Indiana
1/18/1937		Ohio State	W 43–36	9–2 (3–2)	The Fieldhouse; Bloomington, Indiana
1/30/1937*		at Loyola (Chicago)	L 30–36	9–3 (3–2)	Alumni Gym; Chicago
2/1/1937*		at Ball State	W 31–22	10–3 (3–2)	Ball Gymnasium; Muncie, Indiana
2/6/1937		at Iowa	W 38–34	11–3 (4–2)	Iowa Field House; Iowa City, IA
2/8/1937		Chicago	W 47–36	12–3 (5–2)	The Fieldhouse; Bloomington, Indiana
2/13/1937		at Ohio State	L 44–48	12–4 (5–3)	Ohio Expo Center Coliseum; Columbus, Ohio
2/15/1937		at Michigan	L 31–55	12–5 (5–4)	Yost Field House; Ann Arbor, Michigan
2/20/1937		Illinois; Rivalry	L 25–42	12–6 (5–5)	The Fieldhouse; Bloomington, Indiana
2/27/1937		at Purdue; Rivalry	L 45–69	12–7 (5–6)	Lafayette Jefferson HS Gymnasium; West Lafayette, Indiana
3/1/1937		Michigan	W 31–27	13–7 (6–6)	The Fieldhouse; Bloomington, Indiana
*Non-conference game. ^{#}Rankings from AP Poll. (#) Tournament seedings in parentheses.
