= Hank Luisetti =

American basketball player (1916–2002)

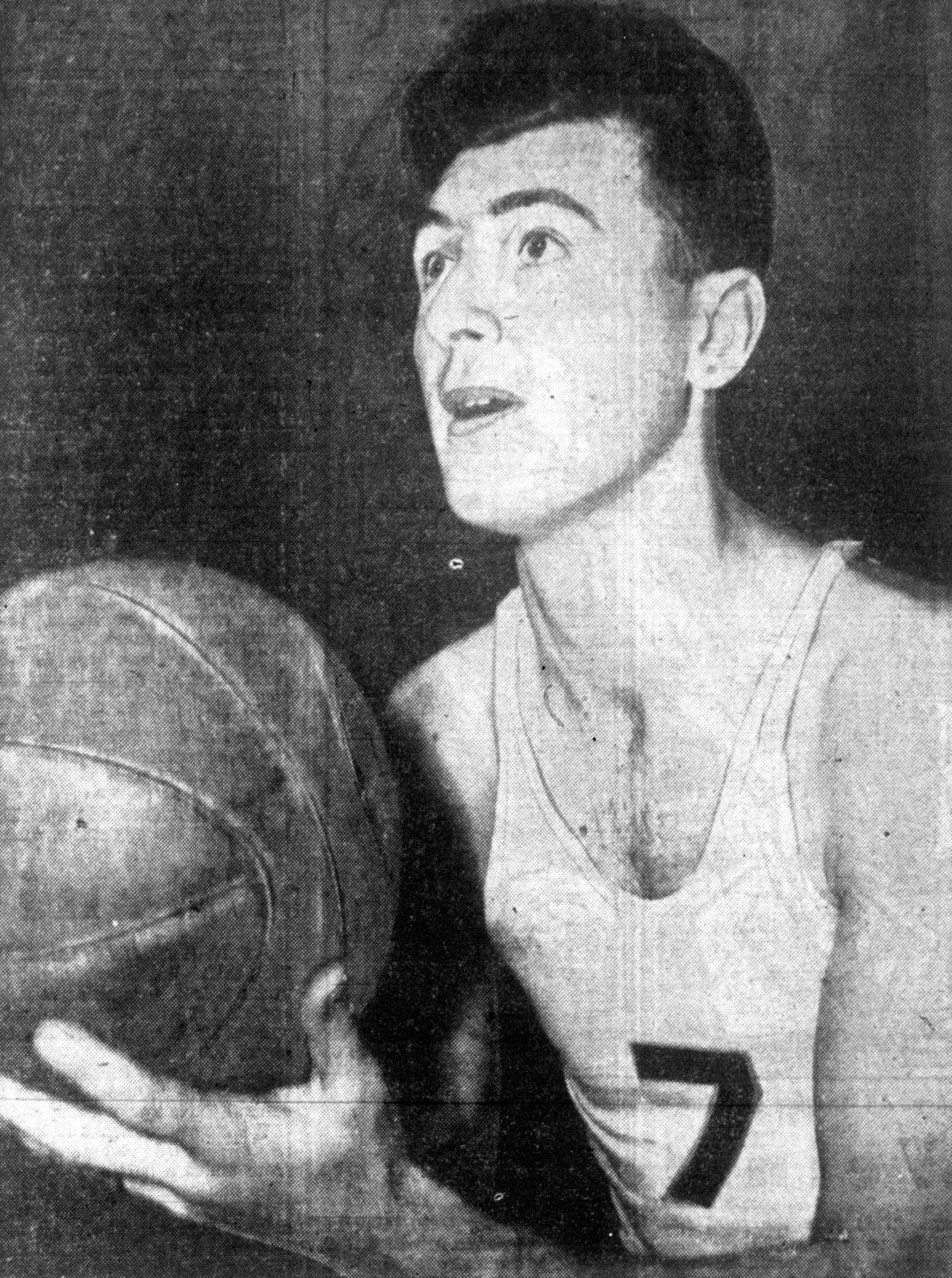
- Luisetti, c. 1943

Personal information
- Born: June 16, 1916 San Francisco, California, U.S.
- Died: December 17, 2002 (aged 86) San Mateo, California, U.S.
- Listed height: 6 ft 2 in (1.88 m)
- Listed weight: 185 lb (84 kg)

Career information
- High school: Galileo (San Francisco, California)
- College: Stanford (1935–1938)
- Position: Forward
- Number: 7

Career highlights
- 2× AAU All-American (1941, 1942); 2× Helms Player of the Year (1937, 1938); 3× Consensus first-team All-American (1936–1938); 2× NCAA scoring champion (1936, 1937); 3× First-team All-PCC (1936–1938); 2× California Mr. Basketball (1933, 1934)
- Basketball Hall of Fame
- Collegiate Basketball Hall of Fame

Angelo-Giuseppi "Hank" Luisetti (June 16, 1916 – December 17, 2002) was an American college basketball player. He is considered to be one of the great innovators of the sport. In an era that featured the traditional two-handed set shot, Luisetti developed the running one-handed shot, an early version of the jump shot. Equipped with such an offensive weapon, Luisetti became one of the most dominant players in American college basketball history. While at Stanford, he joined Delta Kappa Epsilon fraternity.

== Biography ==
A graduate of Galileo High School in his native city, San Francisco, he went on to play for Stanford. He became the first player to score 50 points in a game on January 1, 1938, against Duquesne. Luisetti was named the second-best player of the mid-century (behind George Mikan) by an Associated Press poll of sportswriters and broadcasters in 1950.

Luisetti's influence was aided by a celebrated game between Long Island University and Luisetti's Stanford Indians. Long Island had a 43-game winning streak at the time of the game. The game was played in the evening of December 30, 1936, in Madison Square Garden and a crowd of 17,623 was on hand to see Long Island, the nation's No. 1 team, play Stanford.

Stanford was the defending Pacific Coast Conference champion from the 1935 season and six years later would win an NCAA championship. Still, they were underdogs. The crowd, while not expecting to see their local favorites lose, were intrigued by Luisetti, then a 6-foot-2, 185-pound sophomore. They knew that he shot the ball with one hand while he hung in the air, in stark contrast to the two-handed set shots or hook shots that were commonly attempted in those days.

Although Luisetti scored only 15 points on five field goals and five free throws, Stanford ended the LIU winning streak with a 45–31 victory. The fact that this occurred in the media capital of the country, however, resulted in something more far-reaching. The publicity surrounding Luisetti's shooting style changed the game forever.

Luisetti is often credited with inventing the jump shot, although others were doing it during the 1930s as well. One possible originator was John Miller Cooper. Still, Luisetti definitely popularized it.

Some have mistakenly said that Luisetti kept both feet planted on the court when taking his shots, but it seems clear that he was a jumper. "I'd get the ball, take a dribble or two and jump and shoot on the way up. I didn't jump and shoot at the height of my jump, the way they do now. I'd let the ball go right near my face; I'd push and shoot, off my fingertips." Furthermore, he shot "the ball with one hand while he hung in the air, in defiance of basketball style."

He was an all-around player, whose play and shooting were exciting. "Hank could take over a game like Michael Jordan if he had to," said former Stanford teammate Don Williams. "He was an absolute artist on the basketball court."

Luisetti contracted spinal meningitis while serving in the Navy, ending his basketball career. He never played in the NBA, but "in 1950, the nation's sportswriters voted him the second-best player in the first half of the century."

Among his other accomplishments, he was a naval officer during World War II.

He died in San Mateo, California, in 2002.

Additional facts on Luisetti:

- Luisetti shot a two-handed set shot as well as the running one-hander. He shot his foul shots under handed, like almost everyone else of that era.
- Luisetti used the running one-hander during the transition game, as Stanford's offense of that time relied heavily upon on the fast break. He used the two-handed set shot in the half-court offense.
- Those close to Luisetti never referred to him as "Hank", a chosen name he came up with in his high school days because "Angie" sounded girlish. As he matured in college, he preferred that close friends refer to him as "Ange."
- For 12 consecutive seasons, in every league—from first year in high school to his final season in the service leagues of World War II—Luisetti either won a championship or played in the final game of a championship.
- For several years prior to Luisetti showing up on the Stanford varsity for the 1935–36 season, Stanford did not have a winning season. For the three years Luisetti played varsity basketball, Stanford not only had winning seasons, they won the Pacific Coast Southern Division championship each year. Moreover, in those three years, Stanford went on to win the Pacific Coast championship in a best of 3 championship series with the Northern Division champions.
- According to basketball promoter Ned Irish, Luisetti was the only player who by himself could sell out Madison Square Garden during the 1930s. It was for this reason that Irish invited Stanford back for not one, but a two-game appearance during the 1937 December holiday season. Forced to play three games in four days in two cities, an exhausted Stanford team lost to Temple in Philadelphia, for its only loss during the two seasons of East Coast trips. Two nights later, in Cleveland, a rested Stanford team demolished a respectable Duquesne outfit by the unheard score of 92–27, during which Luisetti scored 50 points.
- In his service league match-up in 1944 against former Stanford star and future five-time NBA All-Star Jim Pollard, Luisetti outscored Pollard, 32 points to 9.
- Ned Irish intended that Luisetti would become the cornerstone of the nascent New York Knicks franchise in 1946. However, due to damage to his heart caused by life-saving sulfa drugs during his bout of spinal meningitis, Luisetti was unable to play again.
