= 1896–97 collegiate men's basketball season in the United States =

American college basketball season

The 1896–97 collegiate men's basketball season in the United States began in December 1896, progressed through the regular season, and concluded in March 1897.

== Rule changes ==
- Backboards were installed for the first time.

== Season headlines ==
- The first "true" college game with five players on the floor for each team occurred on March 20, 1897, when Yale defeated Penn 32–10 at New Haven, Connecticut. (Previously, as many as nine players were on the floor for each team in college games.) Although the first game between two colleges with five players on the floor for each team had taken place in 1896 between Chicago and Iowa, the NCAA does not consider the 1896 game a "true" college game because Iowa's starting line-up consisted of members of a Young Men's Christian Association (YMCA) team who all happened to be attending the University of Iowa. In the 1897 Penn-Yale game, both teams were composed of members of the student body who did not made up a separate team outside of their university.
- In 1995, the Premo-Porretta Power Poll retroactively selected Yale as its top-ranked team for the 1896–97 season.

== Regular season ==
No college basketball conferences existed, but 21 college teams played as major independents. During the season, college teams played against non-collegiate opponents such as athletic clubs, high schools, and Young Men's Christian Association (YMCA) teams as well as against other colleges and universities. The only teams to play 10 or more games were Yale (11–5), Temple (10–11), and Trinity (8–5).

1896–97 collegiate men's basketball independents standings
	Conf.				Overall
Team	W		L	PCT	W		L	PCT
Butler		–		–	1	–	0	1.000
Minnesota A&M		–		–	6	–	0	1.000
Nebraska		–		–	2	–	0	1.000
Wabash		–		–	1	–	0	1.000
Bucknell		–		–	4	–	1	.800
Chicago		–		–	5	–	2	.714
Yale		–		–	11	–	5	.688
Bloomsburg		–		–	6	–	3	.667
Notre Dame		–		–	2	–	1	.667
Trinity (Conn.)		–		–	8	–	5	.615
Central Pennsylvania		–		–	1	–	1	.500
Mount Union		–		–	1	–	1	.500
Penn State		–		–	1	–	1	.500
Purdue		–		–	1	–	1	.500
Temple		–		–	10	–	11	.476
Iowa		–		–	2	–	4	.333
Minnesota		–		–	3	–	6	.333
Pennsylvania		–		–	2	–	4	.333
Allegheny		–		–	0	–	1	.000
Macalester		–		–	0	–	3	.000
Springfield		–		–	0	–	2	.000
