= 1895–96 collegiate men's basketball season in the United States =

American college basketball season

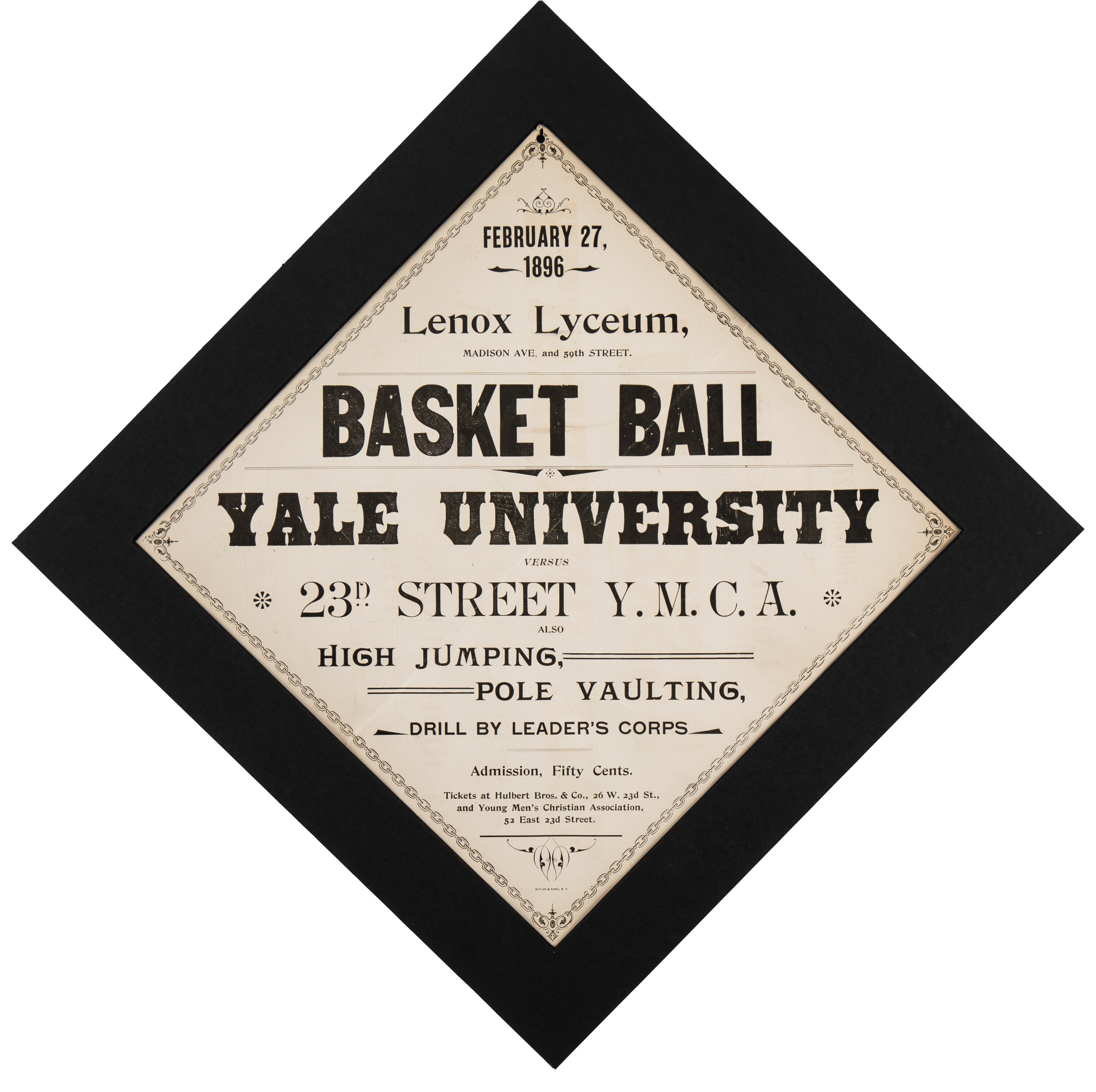

The 1895–96 collegiate men's basketball season in the United States began in December 1895, progressed through the regular season, and concluded in March 1896.

== Rule changes ==
During the 1895–96 season, teams adhered to the 13 original rules of basketball written by the game's inventor, James Naismith, in December 1891 and published in January 1892, as well as a rule change made in 1894 which set the free-throw line at 20 feet (6.1 m). For the 1895–96 season, the following rules changes also were implemented:

- The points awarded for a field goal were reduced from three to two.
- The points awarded for a successful free throw were reduced from three to one.

== Season headlines ==
- The first game between two colleges with five players on the floor for each team was played on January 16, 1896, when Chicago defeated Iowa 15–12 in a game played at Close Hall in Iowa City, Iowa. (Previously, as many as nine players were on the floor for each team in college games.) However, the NCAA does not consider the game a "true" college game, because Iowa's starting line-up consisted of members of a Young Men's Christian Association (YMCA) team who all happened to be attending the University of Iowa. The NCAA considers the first "true" college game with five players on the floor for each team (i.e., between teams composed of members of the student body who did not made up a separate team outside of their college or university) to have taken place the following season.
- In 1995, the Premo Power Poll retroactively selected Temple (15–7) as its top-ranking team for the 1895–96 season. By 2009, the ranking had become the Premo-Porretta Power Poll and this season's selection had changed to Yale (8–5).

== Regular season ==
No college basketball conferences existed, but 16 college teams played as major independents. During the season, college teams played against non-collegiate opponents such as athletic clubs, high schools, and Young Men's Christian Association (YMCA) teams as well as against other colleges and universities. The only teams to play 10 or more games were Minnesota A&M (10–2), Temple (15–7), and Yale (8–5).

1895–96 collegiate men's basketball independents standings
	Conf.				Overall
Team	W		L	PCT	W		L	PCT
Wesleyan		–		–	1	–	0	1.000
Bloomsburg		–		–	6	–	1	.857
Minnesota A&M		–		–	10	–	2	.833
Mount Union		–		–	3	–	1	.750
Chicago		–		–	5	–	2	.714
Temple		–		–	15	–	7	.682
Yale		–		–	8	–	5	.615
Allegheny		–		–	1	–	1	.500
Washington		–		–	1	–	1	.500
Minnesota		–		–	3	–	5	.375
Iowa		–		–	2	–	5	.286
Bucknell		–		–	1	–	3	.250
Central Penn		–		–	0	–	2	.000
Drexel		–		–	0	–	1	.000
Macalester		–		–	0	–	4	.000
Savage School of Physical Education		–		–	0	–	1	.000
