= 1899–1900 collegiate men's basketball season in the United States =

American college basketball season

1899–00 collegiate men's basketball season in the United States

The 1899–1900 collegiate men's basketball season in the United States began in December 1899, progressed through the regular season, and concluded in March 1900.

== Season headlines ==
- In 1995, the Premo-Porretta Power Poll retroactively selected Yale as its top-ranked team for the 1899–1900 season.

== Regular season ==
During the season, college teams played against non-collegiate opponents such as athletic clubs, high schools, and Young Men's Christian Association (YMCA) teams as well as against other colleges and universities.

=== Western Conference ===
The Western Conference (the future Big Ten Conference) was the only college basketball conference. It did not sponsor an official conference season or recognize a regular-season champion until the 1905–06 season, although an intramural game between conference members took place during the 1899–1900 season. Minnesota was the only conference member which played more than 10 games, and it finished with a record of 10–2.

1899–1900 Western Conference men's basketball standings
	Conf.				Overall
Team	W		L	PCT	W		L	PCT
Minnesota†	1	–	0	1.000	10	–	2	.833
Wisconsin	0	–	1	.000	1	–	1	.500
Purdue	0	–	0	–	0	–	1	.000
† Intramural play only; the conference did not have an official championship winner

=== Independents ===
A total of 29 college teams played as major independents. Most played fewer than 10 games. Dartmouth (22–4) played the most games. The others that won 10 or more games were Bloomsburg (12–2), Allegheny (10–4), and Temple (14–8).

1899–1900 collegiate men's basketball independents standings
	Conf.				Overall
Team	W		L	PCT	W		L	PCT
Central Pennsylvania		–		–	1	–	0	1.000
Drexel		–		–	2	–	0	1.000
Illinois State		–		–	5	–	0	1.000
Nebraska		–		–	5	–	0	1.000
Trinity (Conn.)		–		–	2	–	0	1.000
Hiram		–		–	7	–	1	.875
Penn State		–		–	7	–	1	.875
Bloomsburg		–		–	12	–	2	.857
Dartmouth		–		–	22	–	4	.846
Geneva		–		–	8	–	3	.727
Allegheny		–		–	10	–	4	.714
Bucknell		–		–	6	–	3	.667
Butler		–		–	2	–	1	.667
Ohio State		–		–	8	–	4	.667
Wisconsin–Stevens Point		–		–	2	–	1	.667
Temple		–		–	14	–	8	.636
The College of New Jersey		–		–	3	–	2	.600
Yale		–		–	9	–	6	.600
Mount Union		–		–	4	–	3	.571
Indiana State		–		–	2	–	2	.500
Michigan State		–		–	2	–	2	.500
Wabash		–		–	1	–	1	.500
Wisconsin–Superior		–		–	2	–	2	.500
Westminster (Pa.)		–		–	4	–	5	.444
Kansas		–		–	3	–	4	.429
Grove City		–		–	1	–	3	.250
Cornell		–		–	1	–	4	.200
New Mexico		–		–	0	–	1	.000
North Dakota Agricultural		–		–	0	–	2	.000
