= 1896–97 Drexel Blue and Gold men's basketball team =

American college basketball season

1896–97 Drexel Blue and Gold men's basketball
- Conference: Independent
- Record: –
- Home arena: Main Building

1896–97 collegiate men's basketball independents standings
| | Conf. | | | | Overall |
| Team | W | | L | PCT | W | | L | PCT |
|---|---|---|---|---|---|---|---|---|
| Butler | | – | | – | 1 | – | 0 | 1.000 |
| Minnesota A&M | | – | | – | 6 | – | 0 | 1.000 |
| Nebraska | | – | | – | 2 | – | 0 | 1.000 |
| Wabash | | – | | – | 1 | – | 0 | 1.000 |
| Bucknell | | – | | – | 4 | – | 1 | .800 |
| Chicago | | – | | – | 5 | – | 2 | .714 |
| Yale | | – | | – | 11 | – | 5 | .688 |
| Bloomsburg | | – | | – | 6 | – | 3 | .667 |
| Notre Dame | | – | | – | 2 | – | 1 | .667 |
| Trinity (Conn.) | | – | | – | 8 | – | 5 | .615 |
| Central Pennsylvania | | – | | – | 1 | – | 1 | .500 |
| Mount Union | | – | | – | 1 | – | 1 | .500 |
| Penn State | | – | | – | 1 | – | 1 | .500 |
| Purdue | | – | | – | 1 | – | 1 | .500 |
| Temple | | – | | – | 10 | – | 11 | .476 |
| Iowa | | – | | – | 2 | – | 4 | .333 |
| Minnesota | | – | | – | 3 | – | 6 | .333 |
| Pennsylvania | | – | | – | 2 | – | 4 | .333 |
| Allegheny | | – | | – | 0 | – | 1 | .000 |
| Macalester | | – | | – | 0 | – | 3 | .000 |
| Springfield | | – | | – | 0 | – | 2 | .000 |

The 1896–97 Drexel Blue and Gold men's basketball team represented Drexel Institute of Art, Science and Industry during the 1896–97 men's basketball season. The Blue and Gold played their home games at Main Building.

== Roster ==
1896–97 Drexel Dragons men's basketball team
Players
Coaches

| Pos. | # | Name | Height | Weight | Year | Previous school | Hometown |
|---|---|---|---|---|---|---|---|
| | | Dunn | — | — |
| | | Lippincott | — | — |
| | | Bittong | — | — |
| | | Briggs | — | — |
| | | Woodward | — | — |

Head coach

Assistant coach(es)

Legend

- (C) Team captain
- (S) Suspended
- (I) Ineligible
- (W) Walk-on
- Injured
- Current redshirt

== Schedule ==
| Date time, TV | Rank^{#} | Opponent^{#} | Result | Record | High points | High rebounds | High assists | Site (attendance) city, state |
Regular season
| February 8, 1897* | | at South Jersey Institute | W 9–7 | | – | – | – | Bridgeton, NJ |
| February 23, 1897 * | | Manual Training School | T 8–8 | | – | – | – | |
*Non-conference game. ^{#}Rankings from AP. (#) Tournament seedings in parentheses. All times are in Eastern Time.
