= 1897–98 collegiate men's basketball season in the United States =

American college basketball season

The 1897–98 collegiate men's basketball season in the United States began in December 1897, progressed through the regular season, and concluded in March 1898.

== Season headlines ==
- In 1995, the Premo-Porretta Power Poll retroactively selected Mount Union as top-ranked team for the 1897–98 season.

== Regular season ==
No college basketball conferences existed, but 24 college teams played as major independents. During the season, college teams played against non-collegiate opponents such as athletic clubs, high schools, and Young Men's Christian Association (YMCA) teams as well as against other colleges and universities. The only teams to play 10 or more games were Temple (22–5) and Yale (12–9).

1897–98 collegiate men's basketball independents standings
	Conf.				Overall
Team	W		L	PCT	W		L	PCT
Chicago		–		–	1	–	0	1.000
Minnesota A&M		–		–	1	–	0	1.000
Mount Union		–		–	8	–	1	.889
Savage School of Physical Education		–		–	8	–	1	.889
Bloomsburg		–		–	5	–	1	.833
Temple		–		–	22	–	5	.815
Western Reserve		–		–	4	–	1	.800
Penn State		–		–	2	–	1	.667
Westminster (PA)		–		–	4	–	2	.667
Hiram		–		–	3	–	2	.600
Yale		–		–	12	–	9	.571
Allegheny		–		–	2	–	2	.500
Bucknell		–		–	4	–	4	.500
Rose–Hulman		–		–	2	–	2	.500
Butler		–		–	2	–	3	.400
Minnesota		–		–	2	–	4	.333
Notre Dame		–		–	1	–	2	.333
Wisconsin–Stevens Point		–		–	1	–	2	.333
Macalester		–		–	1	–	3	.250
Nebraska		–		–	1	–	3	.250
Central Pennsylvania		–		–	0	–	1	.000
Iowa		–		–	0	–	1	.000
North Dakota State		–		–	0	–	6	.000
Wabash		–		–	0	–	2	.000
