= 1897–98 Bucknell Bison men's basketball team =

American college basketball season

1897–98 Bucknell Bison men's basketball
- Conference: Independent
- Record: 4–4
- Head coach: Student coaches
- Captain: A.A. Smith
- Home arena: none

1897–98 collegiate men's basketball independents standings
	Conf.				Overall
Team	W		L	PCT	W		L	PCT
Chicago		–		–	1	–	0	1.000
Minnesota A&M		–		–	1	–	0	1.000
Mount Union		–		–	8	–	1	.889
Savage School of Physical Education		–		–	8	–	1	.889
Bloomsburg		–		–	5	–	1	.833
Temple		–		–	22	–	5	.815
Western Reserve		–		–	4	–	1	.800
Penn State		–		–	2	–	1	.667
Westminster (PA)		–		–	4	–	2	.667
Hiram		–		–	3	–	2	.600
Yale		–		–	12	–	9	.571
Allegheny		–		–	2	–	2	.500
Bucknell		–		–	4	–	4	.500
Rose–Hulman		–		–	2	–	2	.500
Butler		–		–	2	–	3	.400
Minnesota		–		–	2	–	4	.333
Notre Dame		–		–	1	–	2	.333
Wisconsin–Stevens Point		–		–	1	–	2	.333
Macalester		–		–	1	–	3	.250
Nebraska		–		–	1	–	3	.250
Central Pennsylvania		–		–	0	–	1	.000
Iowa		–		–	0	–	1	.000
North Dakota State		–		–	0	–	6	.000
Wabash		–		–	0	–	2	.000

The 1897–98 Bucknell Bison men's basketball team represented Bucknell University during the 1897–98 college men's basketball season. The team finished with an overall record of 4–4.

== Schedule ==
Date time, TV	Opponent	Result	Record	Site city, state
1/08/1898*	Danville	W 16–15	1–0	
1/14/1898*	at Clover Wheelman	L 6–10	1–1	
1/15/1898*	at Camden	L 3–29	1–2	
1/29/1898*	at Williamsport	L 12–14	1–3	
2/05/1898*	Williamsport	W 30–02	2–3	
2/11/1898*	at State College	L 4–12	2–4	
2/23/1898*	at State College	W 18–05	3–4	
3/05/1898*	Cornell	W 30–07	1–3	
*Non-conference game. (#) Tournament seedings in parentheses.
