= 1896–97 Penn Quakers men's basketball team =

American college basketball season

1896–97 Penn Quakers men's basketball
- Conference: Independent
- Record: 2–4
- Home arena: none

1896–97 collegiate men's basketball independents standings
	Conf.				Overall
Team	W		L	PCT	W		L	PCT
Butler		–		–	1	–	0	1.000
Minnesota A&M		–		–	6	–	0	1.000
Nebraska		–		–	2	–	0	1.000
Wabash		–		–	1	–	0	1.000
Bucknell		–		–	4	–	1	.800
Chicago		–		–	5	–	2	.714
Yale		–		–	11	–	5	.688
Bloomsburg		–		–	6	–	3	.667
Notre Dame		–		–	2	–	1	.667
Trinity (Conn.)		–		–	8	–	5	.615
Central Pennsylvania		–		–	1	–	1	.500
Mount Union		–		–	1	–	1	.500
Penn State		–		–	1	–	1	.500
Purdue		–		–	1	–	1	.500
Temple		–		–	10	–	11	.476
Iowa		–		–	2	–	4	.333
Minnesota		–		–	3	–	6	.333
Pennsylvania		–		–	2	–	4	.333
Allegheny		–		–	0	–	1	.000
Macalester		–		–	0	–	3	.000
Springfield		–		–	0	–	2	.000

The 1896–97 Penn Quakers men's basketball team represented University of Pennsylvania during the 1896–97 collegiate men's basketball season. The Quakers finished the season with an overall record of 2–4.
