= 1895–96 Chicago Maroons men's basketball team =

American college basketball season

1895–96 Chicago Maroons men's basketball
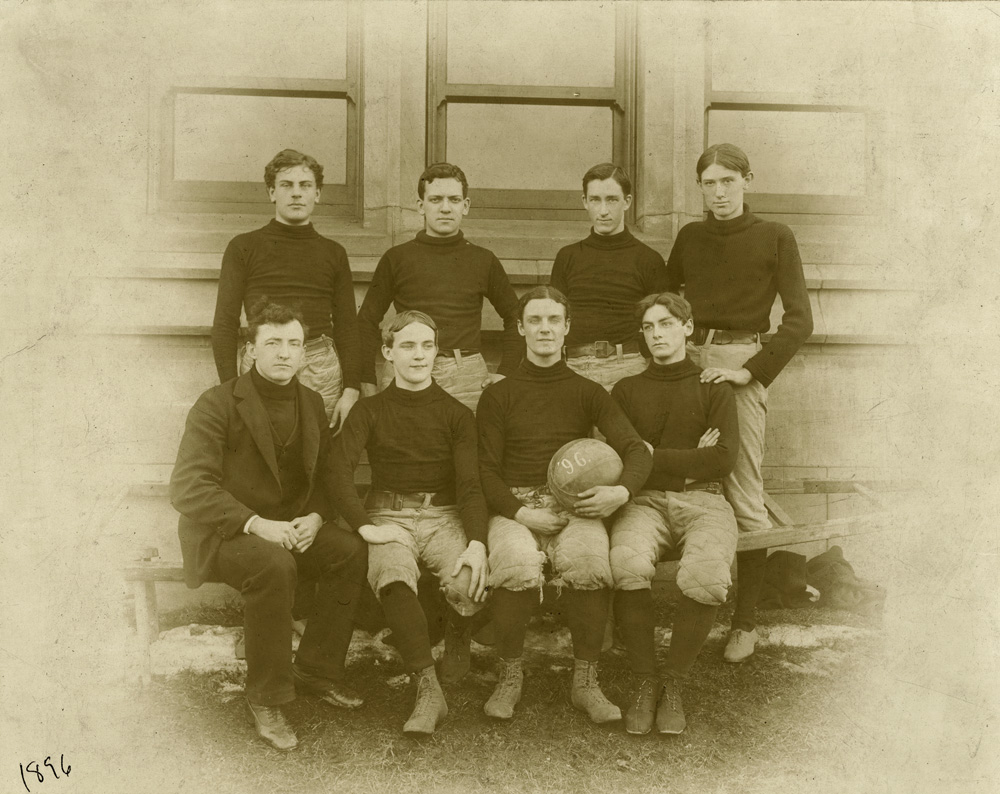
- Conference: Independent
- Record: 5–2
- Head coach: Horace Butterworth (1st season)
- Home arena: Men's Gymnasium

1895–96 collegiate men's basketball independents standings
	Conf.				Overall
Team	W		L	PCT	W		L	PCT
Wesleyan		–		–	1	–	0	1.000
Bloomsburg		–		–	6	–	1	.857
Minnesota A&M		–		–	10	–	2	.833
Mount Union		–		–	3	–	1	.750
Chicago		–		–	5	–	2	.714
Temple		–		–	15	–	7	.682
Yale		–		–	8	–	5	.615
Allegheny		–		–	1	–	1	.500
Washington		–		–	1	–	1	.500
Minnesota		–		–	3	–	5	.375
Iowa		–		–	2	–	5	.286
Bucknell		–		–	1	–	3	.250
Central Penn		–		–	0	–	2	.000
Drexel		–		–	0	–	1	.000
Macalester		–		–	0	–	4	.000
Savage School of Physical Education		–		–	0	–	1	.000

The 1895–96 Chicago Maroons men's basketball team represented the University of Chicago in intercollegiate basketball during the 1895–96 season. The team finished the season with a 5–2 record and have the distinction of playing in the first five-on-five college basketball game played in United States history versus the Iowa Hawkeyes. The team played their home games on campus in the Men's Gymnasium.

The team consisted of seven players; Allen T. Burns and George H. Garrey at guard; Henry D. Hubbard and Arthur J. Mullen at forward; with Earl W. Peabody, Edgar B. Van Osdel and Leon S. Alschuler as centers. The Maroons were coached by Horace Butterworth who would eventually become Northwestern's baseball coach and athletic director followed by becoming head football coach for Temple.

== Five-on-five game ==
=== Roster ===
1895–96 Chicago Maroons men's basketball team
Players
Coaches

Pos.	#	Name	Height	Weight	Year	Hometown
F		Henry Hubbard (C)	—	—		Philadelphia, PA
F		John Mullen	—	—		Woodstock, IL
G		Allen Tibbals Burns	—	—		Chicago, IL
G		George Henry Garrey	—	—		Aurora, IL
C		Earl William Peabody	—	—		Chicago, IL
C		Edgar Bates Van Osdel	—	—		Grand Rapids, MI
C		Leon Samuel Alschuler	—	—		Chicago, IL

Head coach

Horace Butterworth (University of Chicago) (1st year)

Assistant coach(es)

Legend

- (C) Team captain
- (S) Suspended
- (I) Ineligible
- (W) Walk-on
- Injured
- Current redshirt

UChicago Athletics Roster

== Schedule ==
Date time, TV	Opponent	Result	Record	Site city, state
1/14/1896* no, no	YMCA Training	W 14–4	1-0	Men's Gymnasium; Chicago, IL
1/15/1896* no, no	German YMCA	L 9-10	1-1	Men's Gymnasium; Chicago, IL
1/18/1896* no, no	at Iowa; First 5-on-5 college game	W 15-12	2-1	Close Hall; Iowa City, IA
1/29/1896* no, no	West Side YMCA	W 17–12	3-1	Men's Gymnasium; Chicago, IL
2/1/1896* no, no	Iowa	W 34–18	4-1	Men's Gymnasium; Chicago, IL
2/19/1896* no, no	West Side YMCA	L 7-26	4-2	Men's Gymnasium; Chicago, IL
2/20/1896* no, no	Hull House	W 28–13	5-2	Men's Gymnasium; Chicago, IL
*Non-conference game. ^{#}Rankings from AP Poll. (#) Tournament seedings in parentheses. All times are in Central Time.
