= 1896–97 Yale Bulldogs men's basketball team =

American college basketball season

1896–97 Yale Bulldogs men's basketball
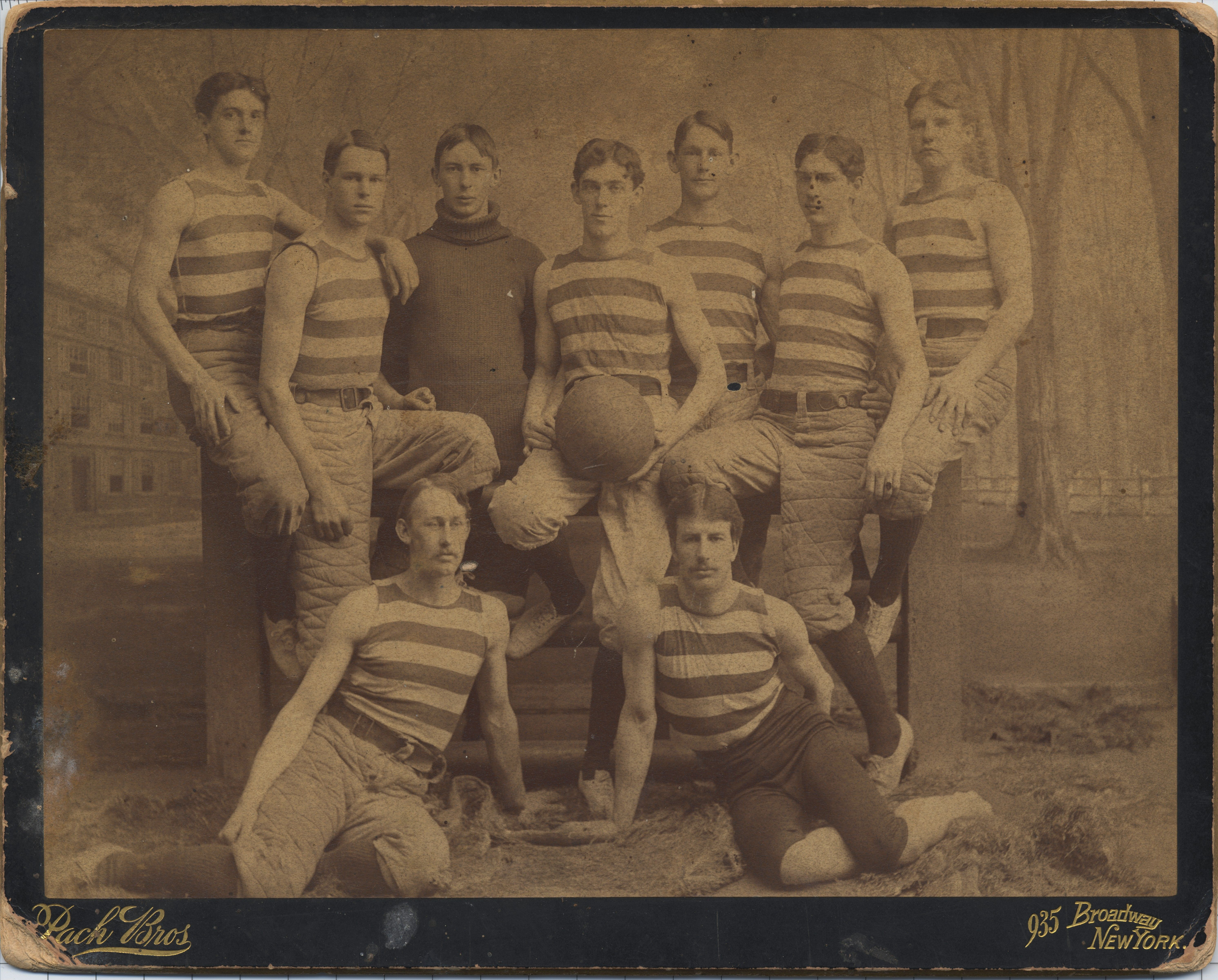
- Conference: Independent
- Record: 11–5
- Head coach: Henry Anderson

1896–97 collegiate men's basketball independents standings
	Conf.				Overall
Team	W		L	PCT	W		L	PCT
Butler		–		–	1	–	0	1.000
Minnesota A&M		–		–	6	–	0	1.000
Nebraska		–		–	2	–	0	1.000
Wabash		–		–	1	–	0	1.000
Bucknell		–		–	4	–	1	.800
Chicago		–		–	5	–	2	.714
Yale		–		–	11	–	5	.688
Bloomsburg		–		–	6	–	3	.667
Notre Dame		–		–	2	–	1	.667
Trinity (Conn.)		–		–	8	–	5	.615
Central Pennsylvania		–		–	1	–	1	.500
Mount Union		–		–	1	–	1	.500
Penn State		–		–	1	–	1	.500
Purdue		–		–	1	–	1	.500
Temple		–		–	10	–	11	.476
Iowa		–		–	2	–	4	.333
Minnesota		–		–	3	–	6	.333
Pennsylvania		–		–	2	–	4	.333
Allegheny		–		–	0	–	1	.000
Macalester		–		–	0	–	3	.000
Springfield		–		–	0	–	2	.000

The 1896–97 Yale Bulldogs men's basketball team represented Yale University in intercollegiate basketball during the 1896–97 season. The team finished the season with an 11–5 record and was retroactively listed as the top team of the season by the Premo-Porretta Power Poll.
