= 1899–1900 Cornell Big Red men's basketball team =

American college basketball season

1899–1900 Cornell Big Red men's basketball
- Conference: Independent
- Record: 1–4
- Head coach: none
- Home arena: none

1899–1900 collegiate men's basketball independents standings
	Conf.				Overall
Team	W		L	PCT	W		L	PCT
Central Pennsylvania		–		–	1	–	0	1.000
Drexel		–		–	2	–	0	1.000
Illinois State		–		–	5	–	0	1.000
Nebraska		–		–	5	–	0	1.000
Trinity (Conn.)		–		–	2	–	0	1.000
Hiram		–		–	7	–	1	.875
Penn State		–		–	7	–	1	.875
Bloomsburg		–		–	12	–	2	.857
Dartmouth		–		–	22	–	4	.846
Geneva		–		–	8	–	3	.727
Allegheny		–		–	10	–	4	.714
Bucknell		–		–	6	–	3	.667
Butler		–		–	2	–	1	.667
Ohio State		–		–	8	–	4	.667
Wisconsin–Stevens Point		–		–	2	–	1	.667
Temple		–		–	14	–	8	.636
The College of New Jersey		–		–	3	–	2	.600
Yale		–		–	9	–	6	.600
Mount Union		–		–	4	–	3	.571
Indiana State		–		–	2	–	2	.500
Michigan State		–		–	2	–	2	.500
Wabash		–		–	1	–	1	.500
Wisconsin–Superior		–		–	2	–	2	.500
Westminster (Pa.)		–		–	4	–	5	.444
Kansas		–		–	3	–	4	.429
Grove City		–		–	1	–	3	.250
Cornell		–		–	1	–	4	.200
New Mexico		–		–	0	–	1	.000
North Dakota Agricultural		–		–	0	–	2	.000

The 1899–1900 Cornell Big Red men's basketball team represented Cornell University during the 1899–1900 college men's basketball season. The team finished with a final record of 1–4.

== Schedule ==
Date time, TV	Opponent	Result	Record	Site city, state
1/26/1900*	vs. Yale	L 3–30	0–1	Newburgh, NY
2/15/1900*	at Bucknell	L 10–29	1–1	Lewisburg, PA
2/16/1900*	at Penn State	L 8–15	1–2	Armory; State College, PA
2/17/1900*	at Dickinson	L 15–21	1–3	
2/24/1900*	at Hamilton	W 22–11	1–4	Hamilton, NY
*Non-conference game. (#) Tournament seedings in parentheses.
