= 1895–96 Yale Bulldogs men's basketball team =

American college basketball season

1895–96 Yale Bulldogs men's basketball
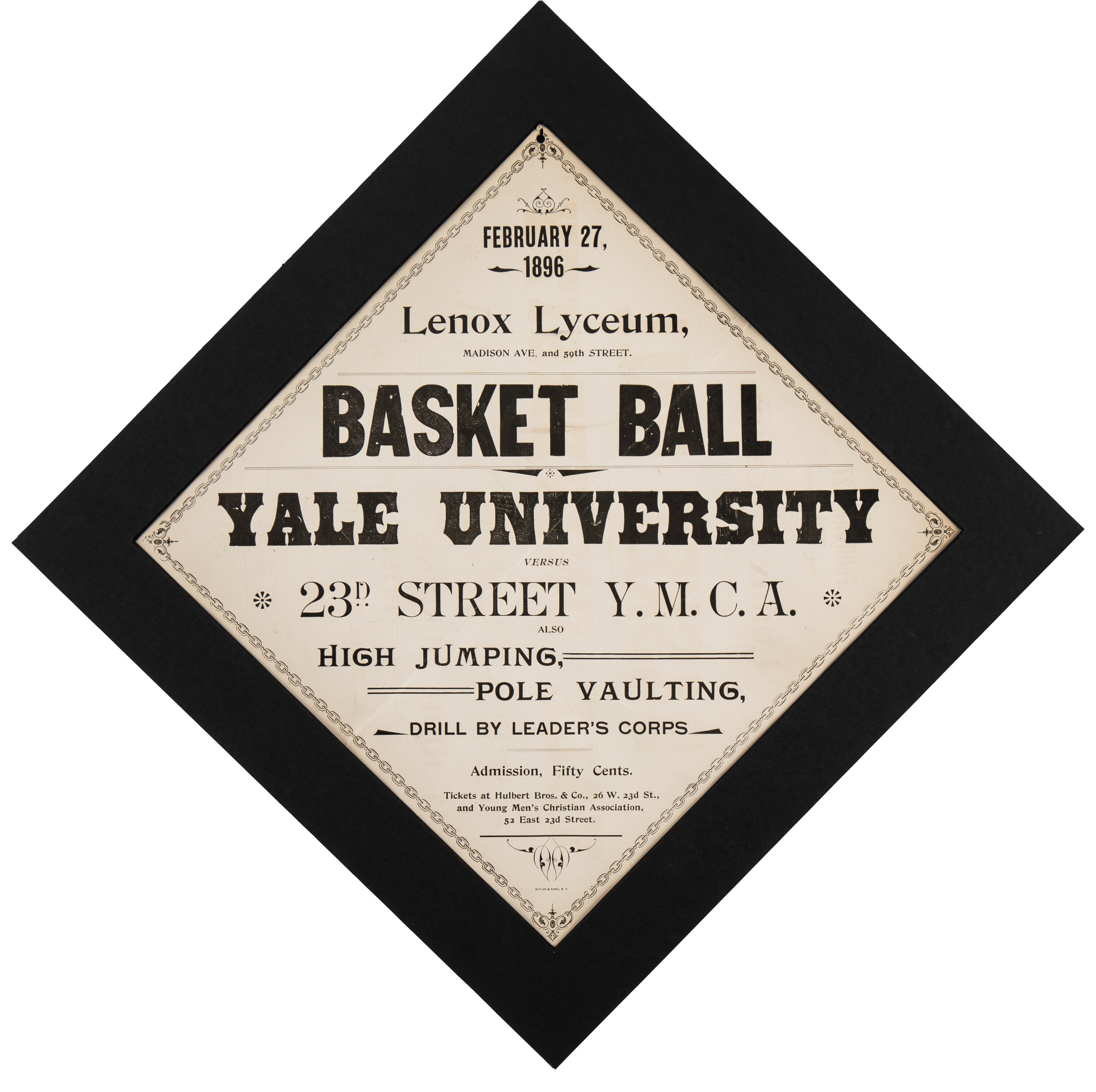
- Conference: Independent
- Record: 8–5
- Head coach: Henry Anderson

1895–96 collegiate men's basketball independents standings
	Conf.				Overall
Team	W		L	PCT	W		L	PCT
Wesleyan		–		–	1	–	0	1.000
Bloomsburg		–		–	6	–	1	.857
Minnesota A&M		–		–	10	–	2	.833
Mount Union		–		–	3	–	1	.750
Chicago		–		–	5	–	2	.714
Temple		–		–	15	–	7	.682
Yale		–		–	8	–	5	.615
Allegheny		–		–	1	–	1	.500
Washington		–		–	1	–	1	.500
Minnesota		–		–	3	–	5	.375
Iowa		–		–	2	–	5	.286
Bucknell		–		–	1	–	3	.250
Central Penn		–		–	0	–	2	.000
Drexel		–		–	0	–	1	.000
Macalester		–		–	0	–	4	.000
Savage School of Physical Education		–		–	0	–	1	.000

The 1895–96 Yale Bulldogs men's basketball team represented Yale University in intercollegiate basketball during the 1895–96 season. The team finished the season with an 8–5 record and was retroactively listed as the top team of the season by the Premo-Porretta Power Poll.

== Schedule and results ==
Date time, TV	Opponent	Result	Record	Site city, state
Regular season
Dec 7, 1895*	at Waterbury YMCA	W 9–4	1–0	Waterbury, CT
Dec 14, 1895*	Company I of New Britain	W 6–2	2–0	New Haven, CT
Jan 18, 1896*	at New Britain YMCA	L 6–10	2–1	New Britain, CT
Jan 25, 1896*	at Brooklyn Central YMCA	W 8–7	3–1	Brooklyn, NY
Feb 1, 1896*	Waterbury YMCA	W 5–3	4–1	New Haven, CT
Feb 8, 1896*	Meriden YMCA	W 8–1	5–1	New Haven, CT
Feb 14, 1896*	at Bridgeport YMCA	W 10–5	6–1	Bridgeport, CT
Feb 18, 1896*	at Trenton YMCA	L 6–10	6–2	Trenton, NJ
Feb 21, 1896*	at Dr. Savage Physical Institute	W 6–5	7–2	New York, NY
Feb 22, 1896*	at Harlem YMCA	L 3–8	7–3	Harlem, NY
Feb 27, 1896*	at 23rd St. YMCA	L 9–10	7–4	Lenox Lyceum; Manhattan, NY
Feb 1, 1896*	Bridgeport YMCA	W 8–0	8–4	New Haven, CT
Mar 14, 1896*	at Harford YMCA	L 9–14	8–5	Hartford, CT
*Non-conference game. ^{#}Rankings from AP Poll. (#) Tournament seedings in parentheses. All times are in Eastern Time.
