= 1896–97 Bucknell Bison men's basketball team =

American college basketball season

1896–97 Bucknell Bison men's basketball
- Conference: Independent
- Record: 4–1
- Head coach: Student coaches
- Captain: R.B. Mulkie
- Home arena: Armory

1896–97 collegiate men's basketball independents standings
	Conf.				Overall
Team	W		L	PCT	W		L	PCT
Butler		–		–	1	–	0	1.000
Minnesota A&M		–		–	6	–	0	1.000
Nebraska		–		–	2	–	0	1.000
Wabash		–		–	1	–	0	1.000
Bucknell		–		–	4	–	1	.800
Chicago		–		–	5	–	2	.714
Yale		–		–	11	–	5	.688
Bloomsburg		–		–	6	–	3	.667
Notre Dame		–		–	2	–	1	.667
Trinity (Conn.)		–		–	8	–	5	.615
Central Pennsylvania		–		–	1	–	1	.500
Mount Union		–		–	1	–	1	.500
Penn State		–		–	1	–	1	.500
Purdue		–		–	1	–	1	.500
Temple		–		–	10	–	11	.476
Iowa		–		–	2	–	4	.333
Minnesota		–		–	3	–	6	.333
Pennsylvania		–		–	2	–	4	.333
Allegheny		–		–	0	–	1	.000
Macalester		–		–	0	–	3	.000
Springfield		–		–	0	–	2	.000

The 1896–97 Bucknell Bison men's basketball team represented Bucknell University during the 1896–97 college men's basketball season. The team finished with an overall record of 4–1.

== Schedule ==
Date time, TV	Opponent	Result	Record	Site city, state
1/23/1897*	Danville	W 18–8	1–0	
2/6/1897*	Penn	W 10–4	2–0	
2/24/1897*	at W'Port YMCA	W 16–8	3–0	
3/5/1897*	State College	W 24–4	4–0	
3/20/1897*	at State College	L 7–10	4–1	
*Non-conference game. (#) Tournament seedings in parentheses.
