= 1895–96 Bucknell Bison men's basketball team =

American college basketball season

1895–96 Bucknell Bison men's basketball
- Conference: Independent
- Record: 1–3
- Head coach: Student coaches
- Captain: D.H. Elliott
- Home arena: Armory

1895–96 collegiate men's basketball independents standings
	Conf.				Overall
Team	W		L	PCT	W		L	PCT
Wesleyan		–		–	1	–	0	1.000
Bloomsburg		–		–	6	–	1	.857
Minnesota A&M		–		–	10	–	2	.833
Mount Union		–		–	3	–	1	.750
Chicago		–		–	5	–	2	.714
Temple		–		–	15	–	7	.682
Yale		–		–	8	–	5	.615
Allegheny		–		–	1	–	1	.500
Washington		–		–	1	–	1	.500
Minnesota		–		–	3	–	5	.375
Iowa		–		–	2	–	5	.286
Bucknell		–		–	1	–	3	.250
Central Penn		–		–	0	–	2	.000
Drexel		–		–	0	–	1	.000
Macalester		–		–	0	–	4	.000
Savage School of Physical Education		–		–	0	–	1	.000

The 1895–96 Bucknell Bison men's basketball team represented Bucknell University during the 1895–96 college men's basketball season. The team finished with an overall record of 1–3.

== Schedule ==
Date time, TV	Opponent	Result	Record	Site city, state
2/14/1896*	Lock Haven	W 16–14	1–0	Armory; Lewisburg, PA
2/21/1896*	at Bloomsburg	L 12–24	1–1	Bloomsburg, PA
2/22/1896*	at Wilkes-Barre	L 6–17	1–2	
2/28/1896*	Williamsport	L 2–12	1–3	Armory; Lewisburg, PA
*Non-conference game. (#) Tournament seedings in parentheses.
