= Henry Hubbard (disambiguation) =

Henry Hubbard (1784–1857) was an American politician.

Henry Hubbard may also refer to:

- Henry D. Hubbard, American standards officer, creator of a periodic table
- Henry Guernsey Hubbard (1850–1899), American scientist
- Henry Vincent Hubbard (1875–1947), American landscape architect
