= 1895–96 Drexel Blue and Gold men's basketball team =

American college basketball season

1895–96 Drexel Blue and Gold men's basketball
- Conference: Independent
- Record: 0–1
- Head coach: F. Knight (1st season)
- Home arena: Main Building

1895–96 collegiate men's basketball independents standings
	Conf.				Overall
Team	W		L	PCT	W		L	PCT
Wesleyan		–		–	1	–	0	1.000
Bloomsburg		–		–	6	–	1	.857
Minnesota A&M		–		–	10	–	2	.833
Mount Union		–		–	3	–	1	.750
Chicago		–		–	5	–	2	.714
Temple		–		–	15	–	7	.682
Yale		–		–	8	–	5	.615
Allegheny		–		–	1	–	1	.500
Washington		–		–	1	–	1	.500
Minnesota		–		–	3	–	5	.375
Iowa		–		–	2	–	5	.286
Bucknell		–		–	1	–	3	.250
Central Penn		–		–	0	–	2	.000
Drexel		–		–	0	–	1	.000
Macalester		–		–	0	–	4	.000
Savage School of Physical Education		–		–	0	–	1	.000

The 1895–96 Drexel Blue and Gold men's basketball team represented Drexel Institute of Art, Science and Industry during the 1895–96 men's basketball season. The Blue and Gold, led by 1st year head coach F. Knight, played their home games at Main Building.

== Roster ==
1895–96 Drexel Dragons men's basketball team
Players
Coaches

Pos.	#	Name	Height	Weight	Year	Previous school	Hometown
		W.H. Gruel	—	—
		Birney	—	—
		Low	—	—
		Brown	—	—
		Conver	—	—
		Fritsen	—	—
		Whitmann	—	—
		Herchine	—	—
		Shol	—	—
		Kempton	—	—
		Gaskill	—	—
		Waring	—	—
		Gorman	—	—
		Mordagh	—	—
		Williams	—	—

Head coach

- F. Knight

Assistant coach(es)

Legend

- (C) Team captain
- (S) Suspended
- (I) Ineligible
- (W) Walk-on
- Injured
- Current redshirt

== Schedule ==
Date time, TV	Rank^{#}	Opponent^{#}	Result	Record	High points	High rebounds	High assists	Site city, state
Regular season
December 6, 1895 *		Temple	L 1–3	0-1	1 – Shol	–	–	Main Building; Philadelphia, PA
February 29, 1896*		Temple Reserves	W 3–0		2 – Low	–	–	
March 14, 1896 *		at Pennsylvania Railroad YMCA Reserves	L 1–2		1 – Birney	–	–	
March, 1896 *		at Conshohocken Pioneers	L 0–4		–	–	–	
March, 1896 *		Trenton Turners	L 0–4		–	–	–	
*Non-conference game. ^{#}Rankings from AP. (#) Tournament seedings in parentheses. All times are in Eastern Time.
