= 1899–1900 Ohio State Buckeyes men's basketball team =

American college basketball season

1899–1900 Ohio State Buckeyes men's basketball
- Conference: Independent
- Record: 8-4
- Head coach: Unknown
- Home arena: The Armory

1899–1900 collegiate men's basketball independents standings
	Conf.				Overall
Team	W		L	PCT	W		L	PCT
Central Pennsylvania		–		–	1	–	0	1.000
Drexel		–		–	2	–	0	1.000
Illinois State		–		–	5	–	0	1.000
Nebraska		–		–	5	–	0	1.000
Trinity (Conn.)		–		–	2	–	0	1.000
Hiram		–		–	7	–	1	.875
Penn State		–		–	7	–	1	.875
Bloomsburg		–		–	12	–	2	.857
Dartmouth		–		–	22	–	4	.846
Geneva		–		–	8	–	3	.727
Allegheny		–		–	10	–	4	.714
Bucknell		–		–	6	–	3	.667
Butler		–		–	2	–	1	.667
Ohio State		–		–	8	–	4	.667
Wisconsin–Stevens Point		–		–	2	–	1	.667
Temple		–		–	14	–	8	.636
The College of New Jersey		–		–	3	–	2	.600
Yale		–		–	9	–	6	.600
Mount Union		–		–	4	–	3	.571
Indiana State		–		–	2	–	2	.500
Michigan State		–		–	2	–	2	.500
Wabash		–		–	1	–	1	.500
Wisconsin–Superior		–		–	2	–	2	.500
Westminster (Pa.)		–		–	4	–	5	.444
Kansas		–		–	3	–	4	.429
Grove City		–		–	1	–	3	.250
Cornell		–		–	1	–	4	.200
New Mexico		–		–	0	–	1	.000
North Dakota Agricultural		–		–	0	–	2	.000

The 1899–1900 Ohio State Buckeyes men's basketball team represented the Ohio State University in its second season of collegiate basketball. Their coach was unknown. They finished with an 8-4 record.

== Schedule ==
Date time, TV	Rank^{#}	Opponent^{#}	Result	Record	Site city, state
December 16, 1899*		East High	W 58-2	1-0	The Armory; Columbus, Ohio
December 23, 1899*		Central High	W 34-4	2-0	The Armory; Columbus, Ohio
January 5, 1900*		Circleville	W 16-8	3-0	The Armory; Columbus, Ohio
January 8, 1900*		Yale	L 6-22	3-1	The Armory; Columbus, Ohio
January 26, 1900*		Springfield YMCA	W 12-6	4-1	The Armory; Columbus, Ohio
February 3, 1900*		Kenyon	W 20-3	5-1	The Armory; Columbus, Ohio
February 7, 1900*		Circleville	W 14-13	6-1	The Armory; Columbus, Ohio
March 2, 1900*		Kenyon	W 31-18	7-1	The Armory; Columbus, Ohio
March 9, 1900*		Circleville	W 16-8	8-1	The Armory; Columbus, Ohio
March 16, 1900*		Kenton	L 12-16	8-2	The Armory; Columbus, Ohio
April 5, 1900*		at Canton	L 9-18	8-3	Canton, Ohio
April 6, 1900*		at Mount Union	L 6-10	8-4	Alliance, Ohio
*Non-conference game. ^{#}Rankings from AP Poll. (#) Tournament seedings in parentheses.
