= 1899–1900 Indiana State Sycamores men's basketball team =

American college basketball season

1899–1900 Indiana State Sycamores men's basketball
- Conference: Independent
- Record: 2–2
- Head coach: John Kimmell (1st season)
- Home arena: North Hall

1899–1900 collegiate men's basketball independents standings
	Conf.				Overall
Team	W		L	PCT	W		L	PCT
Central Pennsylvania		–		–	1	–	0	1.000
Drexel		–		–	2	–	0	1.000
Illinois State		–		–	5	–	0	1.000
Nebraska		–		–	5	–	0	1.000
Trinity (Conn.)		–		–	2	–	0	1.000
Hiram		–		–	7	–	1	.875
Penn State		–		–	7	–	1	.875
Bloomsburg		–		–	12	–	2	.857
Dartmouth		–		–	22	–	4	.846
Geneva		–		–	8	–	3	.727
Allegheny		–		–	10	–	4	.714
Bucknell		–		–	6	–	3	.667
Butler		–		–	2	–	1	.667
Ohio State		–		–	8	–	4	.667
Wisconsin–Stevens Point		–		–	2	–	1	.667
Temple		–		–	14	–	8	.636
The College of New Jersey		–		–	3	–	2	.600
Yale		–		–	9	–	6	.600
Mount Union		–		–	4	–	3	.571
Indiana State		–		–	2	–	2	.500
Michigan State		–		–	2	–	2	.500
Wabash		–		–	1	–	1	.500
Wisconsin–Superior		–		–	2	–	2	.500
Westminster (Pa.)		–		–	4	–	5	.444
Kansas		–		–	3	–	4	.429
Grove City		–		–	1	–	3	.250
Cornell		–		–	1	–	4	.200
New Mexico		–		–	0	–	1	.000
North Dakota Agricultural		–		–	0	–	2	.000

The 1899–1900 Indiana State Sycamores men's basketball team represented Indiana State University during the 1899–1900 collegiate men's basketball season. The head coach was John Kimmell, in his first season coaching the Sycamores. The team played their home games at North Hall in Terre Haute, Indiana.

== Schedule ==
Date time, TV	Opponent	Result	Record	Site city, state
11/10/1899	at YMCA Terre Haute	W 20–17	1–0	
12/08/1899	YMCA Terre Haute	W 29–14	2–0	North Hall; Terre Haute, IN
2/09/1900	YMCA Indianapolis	L 14–25	2–1	North Hall; Terre Haute, IN
2/23/1900	at YMCA Indianapolis	L 12–25	2–2	
*Non-conference game. (#) Tournament seedings in parentheses.
