= 1897–98 Nebraska men's basketball team =

American college basketball season

1897–98 Nebraska men's basketball
- Conference: Independent
- Record: 1–3
- Head coach: Frank Lehmer (2nd season)
- Home arena: Grant Memorial Hall

1897–98 collegiate men's basketball independents standings
	Conf.				Overall
Team	W		L	PCT	W		L	PCT
Chicago		–		–	1	–	0	1.000
Minnesota A&M		–		–	1	–	0	1.000
Mount Union		–		–	8	–	1	.889
Savage School of Physical Education		–		–	8	–	1	.889
Bloomsburg		–		–	5	–	1	.833
Temple		–		–	22	–	5	.815
Western Reserve		–		–	4	–	1	.800
Penn State		–		–	2	–	1	.667
Westminster (PA)		–		–	4	–	2	.667
Hiram		–		–	3	–	2	.600
Yale		–		–	12	–	9	.571
Allegheny		–		–	2	–	2	.500
Bucknell		–		–	4	–	4	.500
Rose–Hulman		–		–	2	–	2	.500
Butler		–		–	2	–	3	.400
Minnesota		–		–	2	–	4	.333
Notre Dame		–		–	1	–	2	.333
Wisconsin–Stevens Point		–		–	1	–	2	.333
Macalester		–		–	1	–	3	.250
Nebraska		–		–	1	–	3	.250
Central Pennsylvania		–		–	0	–	1	.000
Iowa		–		–	0	–	1	.000
North Dakota State		–		–	0	–	6	.000
Wabash		–		–	0	–	2	.000

The 1897–98 Nebraska men's basketball team represented the University of Nebraska as an independent in the 1897–98 collegiate men's basketball season. The team was led by second-year head coach Frank Lehmer and played home games at Grant Memorial Hall in Lincoln, Nebraska.

== Schedule ==
Date time, TV	Opponent	Result	Record	Site city, state
January 8, 1898	Lincoln YMCA	L 15–9	0–1	Grant Memorial Hall; Lincoln, NE
January 15, 1898	Omaha YMCA	L 16–12	0–2	Grant Memorial Hall; Lincoln, NE
February 1, 1898	Lincoln YMCA	L 20–13	0–3	Grant Memorial Hall; Lincoln, NE
February 22, 1898	at Omaha YMCA	W 10–9	1–3	Omaha, NE
*Non-conference game. (#) Tournament seedings in parentheses.
