= 1895–96 Iowa Hawkeyes men's basketball team =

American college basketball season

1895–96 Iowa Hawkeyes men's basketball
- Conference: Independent
- Record: 2–5
- Head coach: No coach

1895–96 collegiate men's basketball independents standings
| | Conf. | | | | Overall |
| Team | W | | L | PCT | W | | L | PCT |
|---|---|---|---|---|---|---|---|---|
| Wesleyan | | – | | – | 1 | – | 0 | 1.000 |
| Bloomsburg | | – | | – | 6 | – | 1 | .857 |
| Minnesota A&M | | – | | – | 10 | – | 2 | .833 |
| Mount Union | | – | | – | 3 | – | 1 | .750 |
| Chicago | | – | | – | 5 | – | 2 | .714 |
| Temple | | – | | – | 15 | – | 7 | .682 |
| Yale | | – | | – | 8 | – | 5 | .615 |
| Allegheny | | – | | – | 1 | – | 1 | .500 |
| Washington | | – | | – | 1 | – | 1 | .500 |
| Minnesota | | – | | – | 3 | – | 5 | .375 |
| Iowa | | – | | – | 2 | – | 5 | .286 |
| Bucknell | | – | | – | 1 | – | 3 | .250 |
| Central Penn | | – | | – | 0 | – | 2 | .000 |
| Drexel | | – | | – | 0 | – | 1 | .000 |
| Macalester | | – | | – | 0 | – | 4 | .000 |
| Savage School of Physical Education | | – | | – | 0 | – | 1 | .000 |

The 1895–96 Iowa Hawkeyes men's basketball team represented the University of Iowa in intercollegiate basketball during the 1895–96 season. The team finished the season with a 2–5 record. This squad is historically significant to the sport of college basketball: when they played the University of Chicago on January 18, 1896, the teams faced off with only five players to a side, establishing the first "modern" game of college basketball ever played. Chicago won the game, 15–12.
