= 1895–96 Washington women's basketball team =

American college basketball season

1895–96 Washington women's basketball
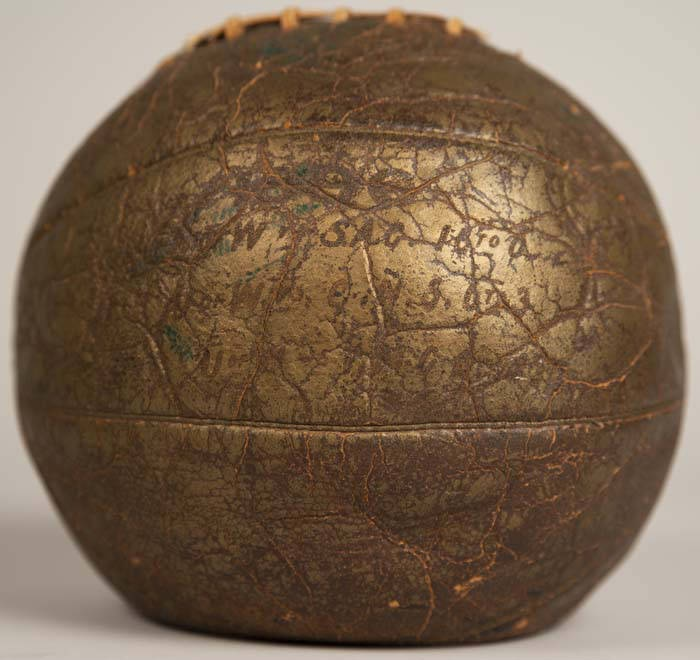
- 1896 game ball in the collection of the Museum of History & Industry
- Conference: Independent
- Record: 3–0
- Head coach: Charles Van Der Veer
- Captain: Mabel Ward

The 1895–96 Washington Huskies women's basketball team represented the University of Washington during the 1895–96 women's college basketball season. This was the first women's basketball team to represent the university.

== Schedule ==
Date time, TV	Opponent	Result	Record	Site city, state
April 10*; 2:30 p.m.	Seattle Athletic Club	W 10–0	1–0	University Armory (300); Seattle, Washington
April 17*; 2:30 p.m.	Ellensburg Normal School	W 6–2	2–0	University Armory; Seattle, Washington
May 15*	Seattle YMCA	W 14–0	3–0	University Armory (300); Seattle, Washington
*Non-conference game. (#) Tournament seedings in parentheses. Source:

== See also ==
- 1895–96 Washington men's basketball team
