= 1899–1900 Yale Bulldogs men's basketball team =

American college basketball season

1899–1900 Yale Bulldogs men's basketball
- Conference: Independent
- Record: 9–6
- Head coach: unknown

1899–1900 collegiate men's basketball independents standings
	Conf.				Overall
Team	W		L	PCT	W		L	PCT
Central Pennsylvania		–		–	1	–	0	1.000
Drexel		–		–	2	–	0	1.000
Illinois State		–		–	5	–	0	1.000
Nebraska		–		–	5	–	0	1.000
Trinity (Conn.)		–		–	2	–	0	1.000
Hiram		–		–	7	–	1	.875
Penn State		–		–	7	–	1	.875
Bloomsburg		–		–	12	–	2	.857
Dartmouth		–		–	22	–	4	.846
Geneva		–		–	8	–	3	.727
Allegheny		–		–	10	–	4	.714
Bucknell		–		–	6	–	3	.667
Butler		–		–	2	–	1	.667
Ohio State		–		–	8	–	4	.667
Wisconsin–Stevens Point		–		–	2	–	1	.667
Temple		–		–	14	–	8	.636
The College of New Jersey		–		–	3	–	2	.600
Yale		–		–	9	–	6	.600
Mount Union		–		–	4	–	3	.571
Indiana State		–		–	2	–	2	.500
Michigan State		–		–	2	–	2	.500
Wabash		–		–	1	–	1	.500
Wisconsin–Superior		–		–	2	–	2	.500
Westminster (Pa.)		–		–	4	–	5	.444
Kansas		–		–	3	–	4	.429
Grove City		–		–	1	–	3	.250
Cornell		–		–	1	–	4	.200
New Mexico		–		–	0	–	1	.000
North Dakota Agricultural		–		–	0	–	2	.000

The 1899–1900 Yale Bulldogs men's basketball team represented Yale University in intercollegiate basketball during the 1899–1900 season. The team finished the season with a 9–6 record and was retroactively listed as the top team of the season by the Premo-Porretta Power Poll.
