= 1899–1900 Kansas Jayhawks men's basketball team =

American college basketball season

1899–1900 Kansas Jayhawks men's basketball
- Conference: Independent
- Record: 3–4
- Head coach: James Naismith (2nd season)
- Captain: Herbert Owens
- Home arena: Snow Hall

1899–1900 collegiate men's basketball independents standings
	Conf.				Overall
Team	W		L	PCT	W		L	PCT
Central Pennsylvania		–		–	1	–	0	1.000
Drexel		–		–	2	–	0	1.000
Illinois State		–		–	5	–	0	1.000
Nebraska		–		–	5	–	0	1.000
Trinity (Conn.)		–		–	2	–	0	1.000
Hiram		–		–	7	–	1	.875
Penn State		–		–	7	–	1	.875
Bloomsburg		–		–	12	–	2	.857
Dartmouth		–		–	22	–	4	.846
Geneva		–		–	8	–	3	.727
Allegheny		–		–	10	–	4	.714
Bucknell		–		–	6	–	3	.667
Butler		–		–	2	–	1	.667
Ohio State		–		–	8	–	4	.667
Wisconsin–Stevens Point		–		–	2	–	1	.667
Temple		–		–	14	–	8	.636
The College of New Jersey		–		–	3	–	2	.600
Yale		–		–	9	–	6	.600
Mount Union		–		–	4	–	3	.571
Indiana State		–		–	2	–	2	.500
Michigan State		–		–	2	–	2	.500
Wabash		–		–	1	–	1	.500
Wisconsin–Superior		–		–	2	–	2	.500
Westminster (Pa.)		–		–	4	–	5	.444
Kansas		–		–	3	–	4	.429
Grove City		–		–	1	–	3	.250
Cornell		–		–	1	–	4	.200
New Mexico		–		–	0	–	1	.000
North Dakota Agricultural		–		–	0	–	2	.000

The 1899–1900 Kansas Jayhawks men's basketball team represented the University of Kansas in its second season of collegiate basketball. The head coach was James Naismith, the inventor of the game, who served his second year. The Jayhawks finished the season 3–4.

== Roster ==
- Clyde Allphin
- Frederick Owens
- Herbert Owens

== Schedule ==
Date time, TV	Opponent	Result	Record	Site city, state
Jan. 20, 1900*	Haskell	W 14-5	1–0	Lawrence, Kansas
Feb. 2, 1900*	Haskell	W 13–7	2–0	Lawrence, Kansas
Feb. 9, 1900*	at Topeka YMCA	L 14–28	2–1	Topeka, Kansas
Feb. 16, 1900*	at Kansas City YMCA	L 8–18	2–2	Kansas City, Missouri
Mar. 2, 1900*	at Nebraska	L 8–48	2–3	Lincoln, Nebraska
Mar. 3, 1900*	at Omaha YMCA	W 12–10	3–3	Omaha, Nebraska
Mar. 6, 1900*	Kansas City YMCA	L 15–21	3–4	Lawrence, Kansas
*Non-conference game. (#) Tournament seedings in parentheses.
