= The Daily Iowan =

University of Iowa student newspaper

- Type: Student newspaper
- Format: Broadsheet
- Publisher: Jason Brummond
- Editor: Roxy Ekberg
- Founded: 1868
- Headquarters: E141 Adler Journalism Building; Iowa City, IA 52242; United States
- Circulation: 6,500
- Website: dailyiowan.com

The Daily Iowan is an independent, 6,500-circulation student newspaper serving Iowa City and the University of Iowa community. During the 2020–2021 academic year The Daily Iowan transitioned from printing daily to producing a print edition of the paper twice a week and publishing stories online daily. It has consistently won a number of collegiate journalism awards, including six National Pacemaker Awards in 2000, 2001, 2006, 2008, 2013, and 2020. The Daily Iowan was named Newspaper of the Year by the Iowa Newspaper Association four times, including in 2020 and 2021.

The print edition is available free of charge on the University of Iowa campus and is available for home delivery by subscription. The publication is entirely student-run and independent from the University of Iowa.

The Daily Iowan’s competitors include The Gazette of Cedar Rapids, The Des Moines Register and the Iowa City Press-Citizen.

George Gallup, creator of the Gallup poll, served as editor of The Daily Iowan in the early 1920s. Jason Brummond has been the newspaper's publisher since 2017, when the previous publisher, William Casey, retired. Casey had served in the post since 1976 and is credited with starting the newspaper's scholarship program for talented future journalists, who have since worked at news agencies such as The Associated Press, The New York Times, The Wall Street Journal, St. Petersburg Times, The Dallas Morning News, The Star Tribune, The Des Moines Register, ESPN, USA Today, SPIN Magazine and The Times-Picayune. The scholarship program began in 1987. Each year, up to four high school seniors are selected for the four-year scholarship.

== History ==
The University Reporter was the University of Iowa's first publication. It began as a 16-page monthly paper in 1868. In 1878, The Vidette emerged as a rival paper. The two publications merged into The Vidette-Reporter, a triweekly paper in September 1881. The Vidette-Reporter eventually combined with The SUI Quill, another university publication, published weekly, that began in 1891, to form The Daily Iowan in 1901. The first issue of The Daily Iowan came out on September 21, 1901. It was first published in the offices of Miles and Moulton at 18 South Clinton Street in Iowa City and cost five cents.

In 1903, the paper moved to 21 Washington Street, where the University Press Company was located.

The Daily Iowan was owned by the student editors and was passed along each year to the next year's student editor. This ended in 1916, when the student-faculty board formed The Daily Iowan Publishing Company. Along with the new ownership, The Daily Iowan moved to 28 South Clinton Street, and one year later moved again to offices on Iowa Avenue. In 1924, The Daily Iowan became a part of the Associated Press.

The Daily Iowan inhabited Close Hall, on Dubuque Street and Iowa Avenue, along with the University of Iowa School of Journalism beginning in 1924. There was a period in 1940 where the paper was moved temporarily to East Hall, which is known today as Seashore Hall, because the second floor of Close Hall caught fire and was deemed too hazardous. During that time, printing was done on the presses of the Iowa City Press-Citizen. After Close Hall was renovated, printing returned to Close Hall, while The Daily Iowan newsroom and the School of Journalism remained in East Hall in a newly added wing. Printing remained at Close Hall until 1966 when the building was destroyed by a fire.

On March 23, 1953, The Daily Iowan moved with the School of Journalism to the Communications Center on Madison Street.

The Daily Iowan added the online platform in 1995.

In 2005, The Daily Iowan and the School of Journalism moved into the Adler Journalism Building on Iowa Avenue, where it currently resides.

The Daily Iowan added a TV component in 2005 titled DITV. Daily morning newscasts were primarily aired via YouTube on The Daily Iowan's website until 2020. Daily Iowan TV produced newscasts specifically for social media starting in 2020, rebranding the newscast as DITV NOW. Daily Iowan TV now is back to producing live newscasts 3 days a week, Mondays, Wednesdays, and Fridays via YouTube and dailyiowan.com/ditv. Students have the opportunity to work with the same equipment and technology used in the professional broadcast industry.

In January 2024, The Daily Iowan purchased two weekly newspapers, the Mount Vernon-Lisbon Sun and Solon Economist, from Woodward Communications. Both papers had a combined circulation of 1,900. The sale price was not disclosed.
