= 1899–1900 Penn State Nittany Lions basketball team =

American college basketball season

1899–1900 Penn State Nittany Lions men's basketball
- Conference: Independent
- Record: 7–1
- Head coach: student coaches
- Captain: J.S. Ruble
- Home arena: Armory

The 1899–1900 Penn State Nittany Lions basketball team represented Penn State University during the 1899–00 college men's basketball season. The team finished with a final record of 7–1.

== Schedule ==
Date time, TV	Opponent	Result	Record	Site city, state
1/28/1900*	Lock Haven	W 17–13	1–0	Armory; University Park, PA
2/03/1900*	Dickinson	W 42–6	2–0	Armory; University Park, PA
2/10/1900*	Bucknell	W 11–6	3–0	Armory; University Park, PA
2/14/1900*	Williamsport YMCA	W 27–7	4–0	Armory; University Park, PA
2/16/1900*	Cornell	W 15–8	5–0	Armory; University Park, PA
3/01/1900*	at Lock Haven	W 10–9	6–0	
3/02/1900*	at Williamsport YMCA	W 4–3	7–0	
3/03/1900*	at Bucknell	L 6–19	7–1	Lewisburg, PA
*Non-conference game. (#) Tournament seedings in parentheses.
