= Premo-Porretta Power Poll =

Retroactive rankings in US college basketball

The Premo-Porretta Power Poll is a retroactive end-of-year ranking for American college basketball teams competing in the 1895–96 through the 1947–48 seasons. These rankings are not officially recognized by the NCAA.

The poll was intended to serve collectively as a source of information regarding the relative standings of college basketball teams within given seasons during the early decades of the sport. No systematic end-of-season national tournament existed in college basketball until the founding of the National Invitation Tournament in 1938 and the NCAA Men's Division I Basketball Championship Tournament in 1939, the latter of which determines the NCAA champion for a given season. Furthermore, no regular, recognized national polling took place for college basketball prior to the establishment of the Associated Press poll and the coaches poll in the 1948–49 and 1950–51 seasons, respectively.

== Background ==
Patrick Premo, a professor emeritus of accounting at St. Bonaventure University, and Phil Porretta, a former computer programmer, have each spent more than 40 years—first separately, and later collaboratively—researching the early history of college basketball. Their archival work has often uncovered game results that had not previously been reported in books and basketball program media guides, such as the results of competition against AAU, semi-professional, club, and YMCA teams. Whereas Bill Schroeder of the Helms Athletic Foundation retroactively named only his choice of the top team nationally for each season from 1900–01 through 1941–42 (and then annually selected a national champion for each season from 1942–43 through 1981–82), Premo and Porretta have used the data they have compiled to compare teams against one another and assign rankings to multiple teams for each season—15 teams for the 1895–96 season, 20 teams for each season from 1896–97 through 1908–09, and 25 teams for each season from 1909–10 through 1947–48.

Premo's findings, which he clarified were "simply his opinion", were first published in 1995 as the Premo Power Poll. Most recently, in 2009, Premo and Porretta's full collaborative rankings were included with the core information for each season prior to 1949 in the ESPN College Basketball Encyclopedia.

== Retroactive top-ranked teams ==
The teams listed below are the highest-ranked teams in the Premo-Porretta Power Poll for that season.

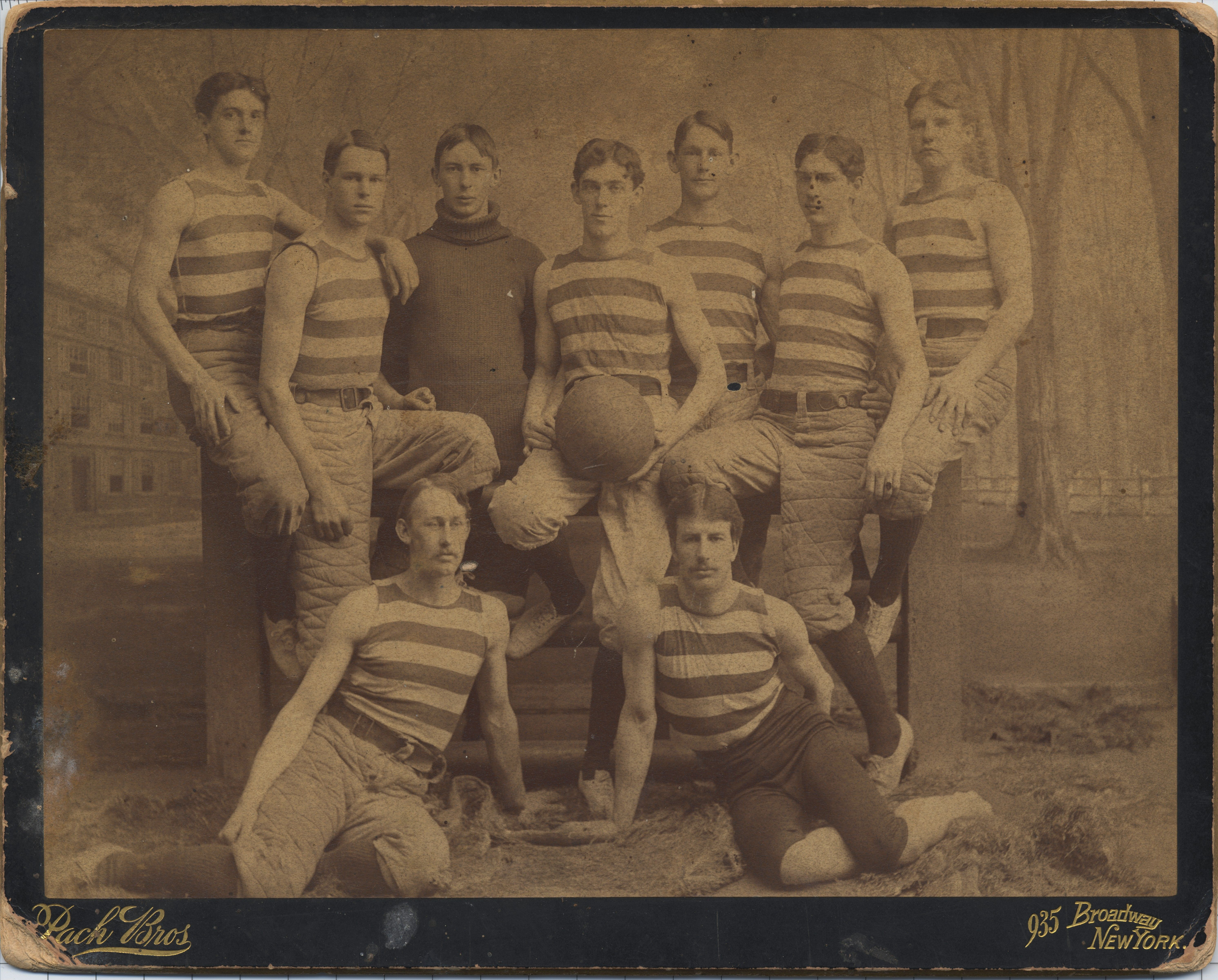
Yale Bulldogs, 1896–97

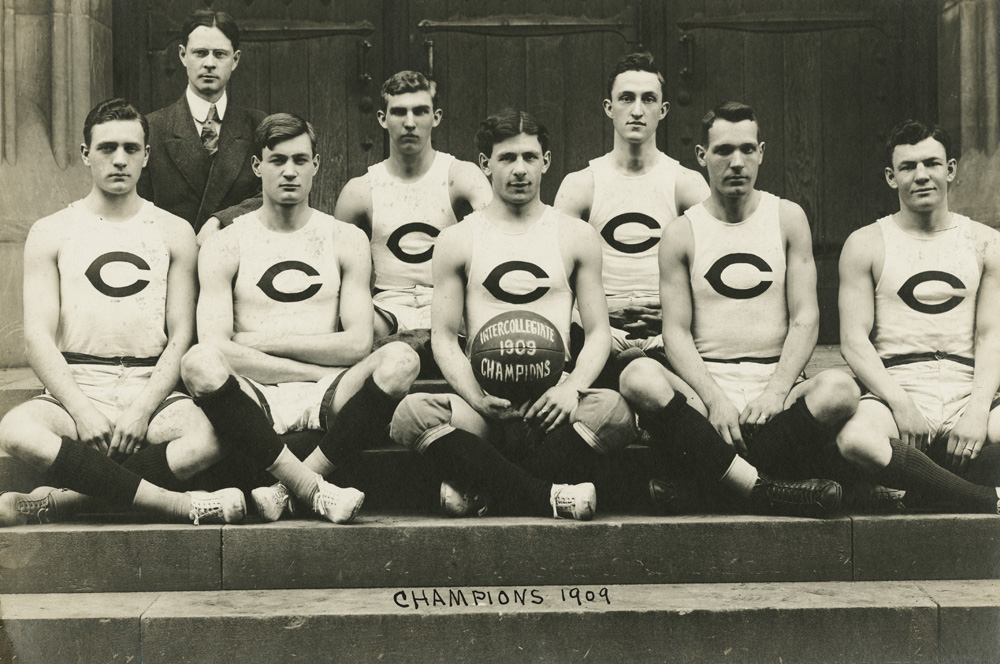
Chicago Maroons, 1908–09

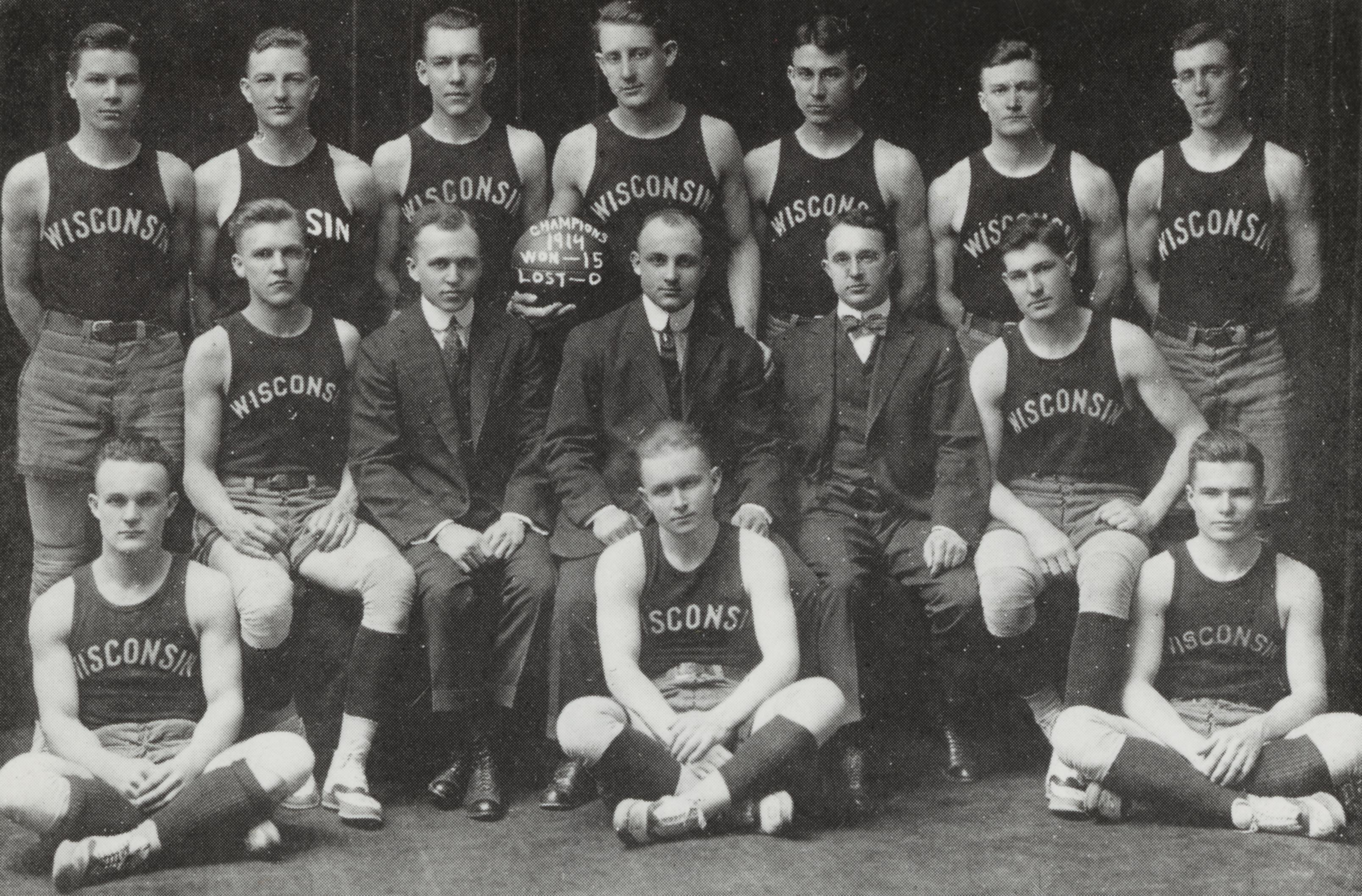
Wisconsin Badgers, 1913–14

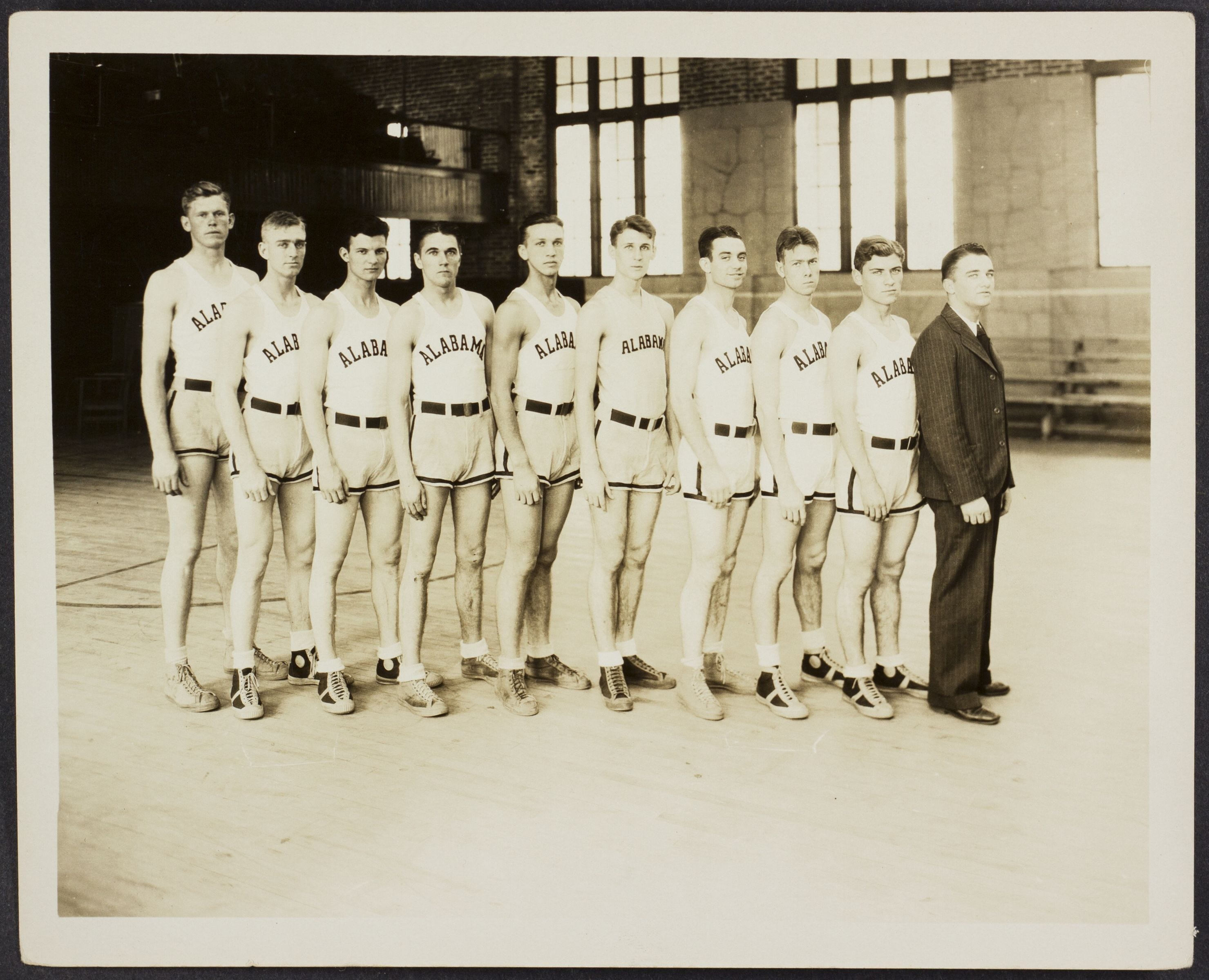
Alabama Crimson Tide, 1929–30

Power Poll No. 1 teams (1892–1948)
Year	Premo (1995)	Premo-Porretta (2009)
1892–93	Iowa	—
1893–94	Hiram	—
1894–95	Temple	—
1895–96	Temple	Yale
1896–97	Yale	
1897–98	Mount Union	
1898–99	Yale	
1899–1900	Yale	
1900–01	Bucknell	
1901–02	Minnesota	
1902–03	Minnesota	
1903–04	Columbia	
1904–05	Columbia	
1905–06	Wabash	
1906–07	Chicago	Williams
1907–08	Wabash	
1908–09	Chicago	
1909–10	Williams	
1910–11	St. John's	
1911–12	Wisconsin	
1912–13	Navy	
1913–14	Wisconsin	
1914–15	Illinois	
1915–16	Wisconsin	
1916–17	Washington State	
1917–18	Syracuse	
1918–19	Navy	
1919–20	Penn	
1920–21	Missouri	
1921–22	Missouri	
1922–23	Army	
1923–24	North Carolina	
1924–25	Princeton	
1925–26	Syracuse	
1926–27	Notre Dame	California
1927–28	Pittsburgh	
1928–29	Montana State	
1929–30	Alabama	
1930–31	Northwestern	
1931–32	Purdue	
1932–33	Texas	
1933–34	South Carolina	Kentucky
1934–35	Richmond	NYU
1935–36	Long Island	
1936–37	Stanford	
1937–38	Temple ^{NIT}	
1938–39	Long Island ^{NIT}	
1939–40	Indiana ^{NCAA}	
1940–41	Long Island ^{NIT}	
1941–42	Stanford ^{NCAA}	
1942–43	Illinois	
1943–44	Army	
1944–45	Iowa	
1945–46	Oklahoma A&M ^{NCAA}	
1946–47	Kentucky	
1947–48	Kentucky ^{NCAA}	

- NIT champion: ^{NIT}
- NCAA tournament champion: ^{NCAA}
