= 1897–98 Yale Bulldogs men's basketball team =

American college basketball season

1897–98 Yale Bulldogs men's basketball
- Conference: Independent
- Record: 12–9
- Head coach: Henry S. Anderson (3rd season)
- Captain: William H. Peck

1897–98 collegiate men's basketball independents standings
	Conf.				Overall
Team	W		L	PCT	W		L	PCT
Chicago		–		–	1	–	0	1.000
Minnesota A&M		–		–	1	–	0	1.000
Mount Union		–		–	8	–	1	.889
Savage School of Physical Education		–		–	8	–	1	.889
Bloomsburg		–		–	5	–	1	.833
Temple		–		–	22	–	5	.815
Western Reserve		–		–	4	–	1	.800
Penn State		–		–	2	–	1	.667
Westminster (PA)		–		–	4	–	2	.667
Hiram		–		–	3	–	2	.600
Yale		–		–	12	–	9	.571
Allegheny		–		–	2	–	2	.500
Bucknell		–		–	4	–	4	.500
Rose–Hulman		–		–	2	–	2	.500
Butler		–		–	2	–	3	.400
Minnesota		–		–	2	–	4	.333
Notre Dame		–		–	1	–	2	.333
Wisconsin–Stevens Point		–		–	1	–	2	.333
Macalester		–		–	1	–	3	.250
Nebraska		–		–	1	–	3	.250
Central Pennsylvania		–		–	0	–	1	.000
Iowa		–		–	0	–	1	.000
North Dakota State		–		–	0	–	6	.000
Wabash		–		–	0	–	2	.000

The 1897–98 Yale Bulldogs men's basketball team represented Yale University in college basketball during the 1897–98 season. The team finished the season with a 12–9 record. They were disqualified for playing a game against 4th Sep. Company in Yonkers but were later reinstated. Yale's coach was Henry S. Anderson and their team captain was William H. Peck.

== Schedule ==
Date time, TV	Rank^{#}	Opponent^{#}	Result	Record	Site city, state
December 4		at Waterbury YMCA	L 20–29	0–1	Waterbury, CT
December 9		at Middletown YMCA	L 11–26	0–2	Middletown, CT
December 11		at Hartford YMCA	L 13–33	0–3	Hartford, CT
December 28		at Pennsylvania Wheelmen	W 16–3	1–3	Philadelphia, PA
December 30		at Germantown YMCA	W 15–10	2–3	Germantown, PA
December 31		at Washington LT. Infantry	W 22–10	3–3	
January 8		vs. Hancock YMCA	L 8–17	3–4	Philadelphia, PA
January 15		at 4th Sep. Company	L 7–8	3–5	Yonkers, NY
January 22		at Springfield Training	W 32–16	4–5	
February 1		at Wallingford YMCA	W 13–8	5–5	Wallingford, CT
February 5		at Middletown YMCA	L 2–20	5–6	Middletown, CT
February 8		at Trinity	W 36–10	6–6	
February 10		at Knickerbocker AC	W 27–7	7–6	New York
February 18		vs. 15th Sep. Company	W 23–20	8–6	Poughkeepsie, NY
February 19		vs. Washington Heights YMCA	L 11–12	8–7	New York
February 23		New Britain YMCA	W 22–9	9–7	New Haven, CT
February 24		at New Britain YMCA	L 6–16	9–8	
February 26		at Brattleboro YMCA	W 22–13	10–8	Brattleboro, VT
March 9		Trinity	W 61–9	11–8	New Haven, CT
March 12		at 4th Sep. Company	L 8–9	11–9	Yonkers, NY
*Non-conference game. ^{#}Rankings from AP Poll. (#) Tournament seedings in parentheses. Note: Yale's game by game results only list 20 of the 21 games
