= 1899–1900 Wisconsin Badgers men's basketball team =

American college basketball season

1899–1900 Wisconsin Badgers men's basketball
- Conference: Big Ten Conference
- Record: 1–1 (0–1 Western)
- Head coach: James C. Elsom
- Home arena: Red Gym

1899–1900 Western Conference men's basketball standings
	Conf.				Overall
Team	W		L	PCT	W		L	PCT
Minnesota†	1	–	0	1.000	10	–	2	.833
Wisconsin	0	–	1	.000	1	–	1	.500
Purdue	0	–	0	–	0	–	1	.000
† Intramural play only; the conference did not have an official championship winner

The 1899–1900 Wisconsin Badgers men's basketball team represented University of Wisconsin–Madison. The head coach was Dr. James C. Elsom, coaching his second season with the Badgers. The team played their home games at the Red Gym in Madison, Wisconsin and was a member of the Western Conference.

== Schedule ==
Date time, TV	Rank^{#}	Opponent^{#}	Result	Record	Site city, state
Regular Season
2/17/1900		at Minnesota	L 15–17	0–1	Minnesota Armory; Minneapolis, MN
2/23/1900*		at Wayland Academy (WI)	W 25–15	1–1	Beaver Dam, WI
*Non-conference game. ^{#}Rankings from AP Poll. (#) Tournament seedings in parentheses.
