= 1897–98 Butler Christians men's basketball team =

American college basketball season

1897–98 Butler Bulldogs men's basketball
- Conference: Independent
- Record: 2–3
- Head coach: James Zink (1st season)

1897–98 collegiate men's basketball independents standings
	Conf.				Overall
Team	W		L	PCT	W		L	PCT
Chicago		–		–	1	–	0	1.000
Minnesota A&M		–		–	1	–	0	1.000
Mount Union		–		–	8	–	1	.889
Savage School of Physical Education		–		–	8	–	1	.889
Bloomsburg		–		–	5	–	1	.833
Temple		–		–	22	–	5	.815
Western Reserve		–		–	4	–	1	.800
Penn State		–		–	2	–	1	.667
Westminster (PA)		–		–	4	–	2	.667
Hiram		–		–	3	–	2	.600
Yale		–		–	12	–	9	.571
Allegheny		–		–	2	–	2	.500
Bucknell		–		–	4	–	4	.500
Rose–Hulman		–		–	2	–	2	.500
Butler		–		–	2	–	3	.400
Minnesota		–		–	2	–	4	.333
Notre Dame		–		–	1	–	2	.333
Wisconsin–Stevens Point		–		–	1	–	2	.333
Macalester		–		–	1	–	3	.250
Nebraska		–		–	1	–	3	.250
Central Pennsylvania		–		–	0	–	1	.000
Iowa		–		–	0	–	1	.000
North Dakota State		–		–	0	–	6	.000
Wabash		–		–	0	–	2	.000

The 1897–98 Butler Christians men's basketball team represented Butler University during the 1897–98 college men's basketball season. The head coach was James Zink, coaching in his first season with the team.

== Schedule ==
Date time, TV	Opponent	Result	Record	Site city, state
*	Indiana	L 6–22	0–1	Indianapolis, IN
*	Rose Polytechnic Inst.	W 18–0	1–1	Indianapolis, IN
*	Miami (OH)	L 0–6	1–2	Indianapolis, IN
*	Earlham	W 18–0	2–2	Indianapolis, IN
*	Indianapolis Athletic Club	L 0–14	2–3	Indianapolis, IN
*Non-conference game. (#) Tournament seedings in parentheses.
