= 1899–1900 Bucknell Bison men's basketball team =

American college basketball season

1899–1900 Bucknell Bison men's basketball
- Conference: Independent
- Record: 6–3
- Head coach: Student coaches
- Captain: H.B. Wassell
- Home arena: none

1899–1900 collegiate men's basketball independents standings
| | Conf. | | | | Overall |
| Team | W | | L | PCT | W | | L | PCT |
|---|---|---|---|---|---|---|---|---|
| Central Pennsylvania | | – | | – | 1 | – | 0 | 1.000 |
| Drexel | | – | | – | 2 | – | 0 | 1.000 |
| Illinois State | | – | | – | 5 | – | 0 | 1.000 |
| Nebraska | | – | | – | 5 | – | 0 | 1.000 |
| Trinity (Conn.) | | – | | – | 2 | – | 0 | 1.000 |
| Hiram | | – | | – | 7 | – | 1 | .875 |
| Penn State | | – | | – | 7 | – | 1 | .875 |
| Bloomsburg | | – | | – | 12 | – | 2 | .857 |
| Dartmouth | | – | | – | 22 | – | 4 | .846 |
| Geneva | | – | | – | 8 | – | 3 | .727 |
| Allegheny | | – | | – | 10 | – | 4 | .714 |
| Bucknell | | – | | – | 6 | – | 3 | .667 |
| Butler | | – | | – | 2 | – | 1 | .667 |
| Ohio State | | – | | – | 8 | – | 4 | .667 |
| Wisconsin–Stevens Point | | – | | – | 2 | – | 1 | .667 |
| Temple | | – | | – | 14 | – | 8 | .636 |
| The College of New Jersey | | – | | – | 3 | – | 2 | .600 |
| Yale | | – | | – | 9 | – | 6 | .600 |
| Mount Union | | – | | – | 4 | – | 3 | .571 |
| Indiana State | | – | | – | 2 | – | 2 | .500 |
| Michigan State | | – | | – | 2 | – | 2 | .500 |
| Wabash | | – | | – | 1 | – | 1 | .500 |
| Wisconsin–Superior | | – | | – | 2 | – | 2 | .500 |
| Westminster (Pa.) | | – | | – | 4 | – | 5 | .444 |
| Kansas | | – | | – | 3 | – | 4 | .429 |
| Grove City | | – | | – | 1 | – | 3 | .250 |
| Cornell | | – | | – | 1 | – | 4 | .200 |
| New Mexico | | – | | – | 0 | – | 1 | .000 |
| North Dakota Agricultural | | – | | – | 0 | – | 2 | .000 |

The 1899–1900 Bucknell Bison men's basketball team represented Bucknell University during the 1899–1900 college men's basketball season. The team finished with an overall record of 6–3.

== Schedule ==
| Date time, TV | Opponent | Result | Record | Site city, state |
|---|---|---|---|---|
| 12/12/1899* | Danville | W 29–12 | 1–0 | |
| 1/19/1900* | at Bloomsburg | L 05–15 | 1–1 | |
| 1/20/1900* | Pittston | L 12–21 | 1–2 | |
| 2/01/1900* | Dickinson | W 15–12 | 2–2 | |
| 2/08/1900* | at Dickinson | W 15–12 | 3–2 | |
| 2/10/1900* | State College | L 08–11 | 3–3 | |
| 2/17/1900* | Cornell | W 29–10 | 4–3 | |
| 2/22/1900* | Bloomsburg | W 25–5 | 5–3 | |
| 3/05/1900* | State College | W 19–5 | 6–3 | |
*Non-conference game. (#) Tournament seedings in parentheses.
