= Henry D. Hubbard =

American standards officer (1870–1943)

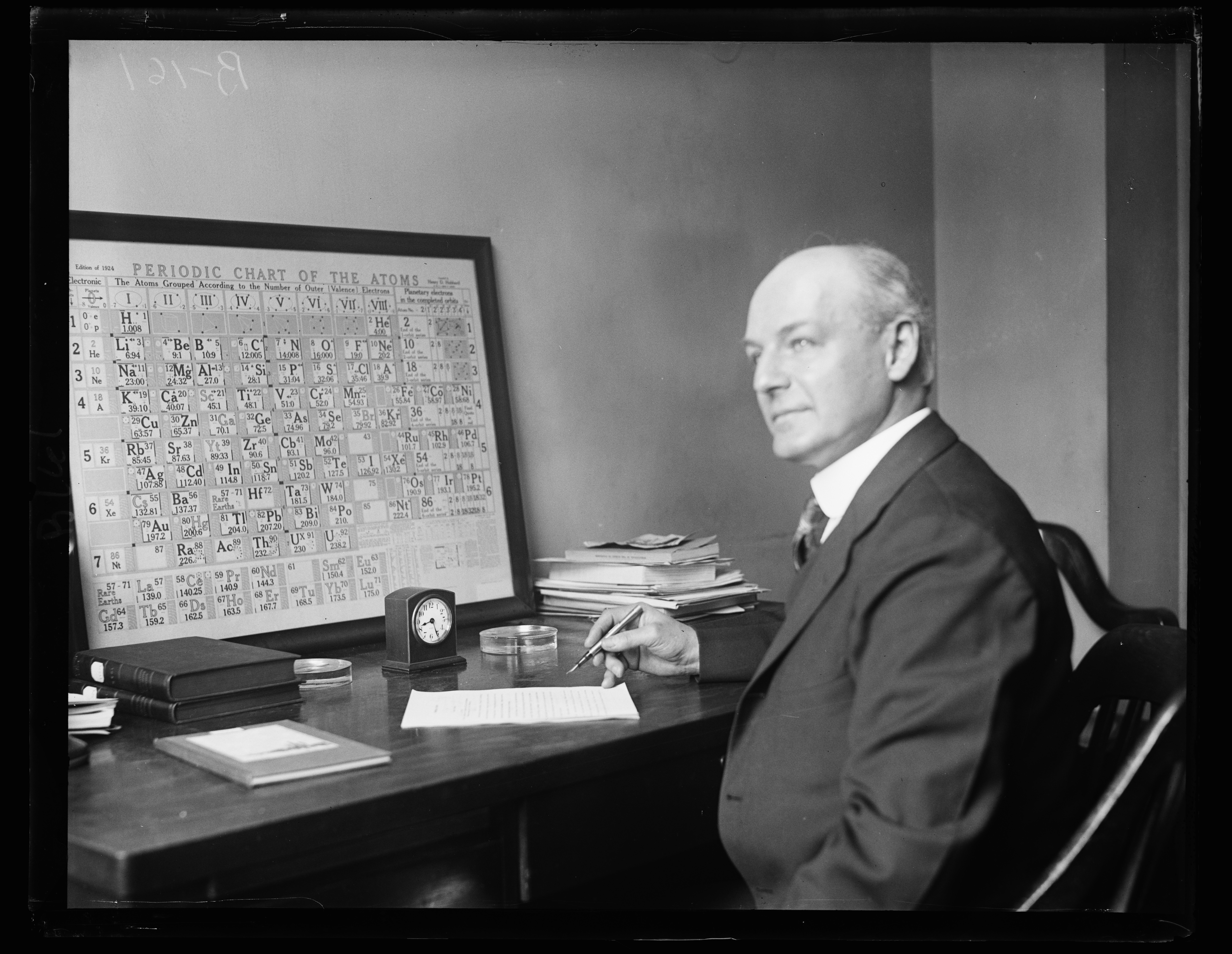
Henry D. Hubbard in front of his 1924 periodic table wallpaper

Henry D. Hubbard (1870–1943) was a member of the U.S. Bureau of Standards in the 1920s.

He modernized Mendeleev's periodic table and in 1924 he produced a version of the Periodic Table of Elements (called the Periodic Chart of the Atoms) which was distributed to schools and universities. His version of the periodic table placed the main groups in columns with some later groups taking up two rows per period and the Group VIIIB transition metals displayed out to the right of the noble gases. The noble gases themselves were shown first in Column 1 (Valence 0) and repeated in Column 9 (Group VIII). The table is also notable for including the solo Neutron as an entry on its own, "above" Hydrogen, and given the symbol lower-case 'n'.

== Gallery ==
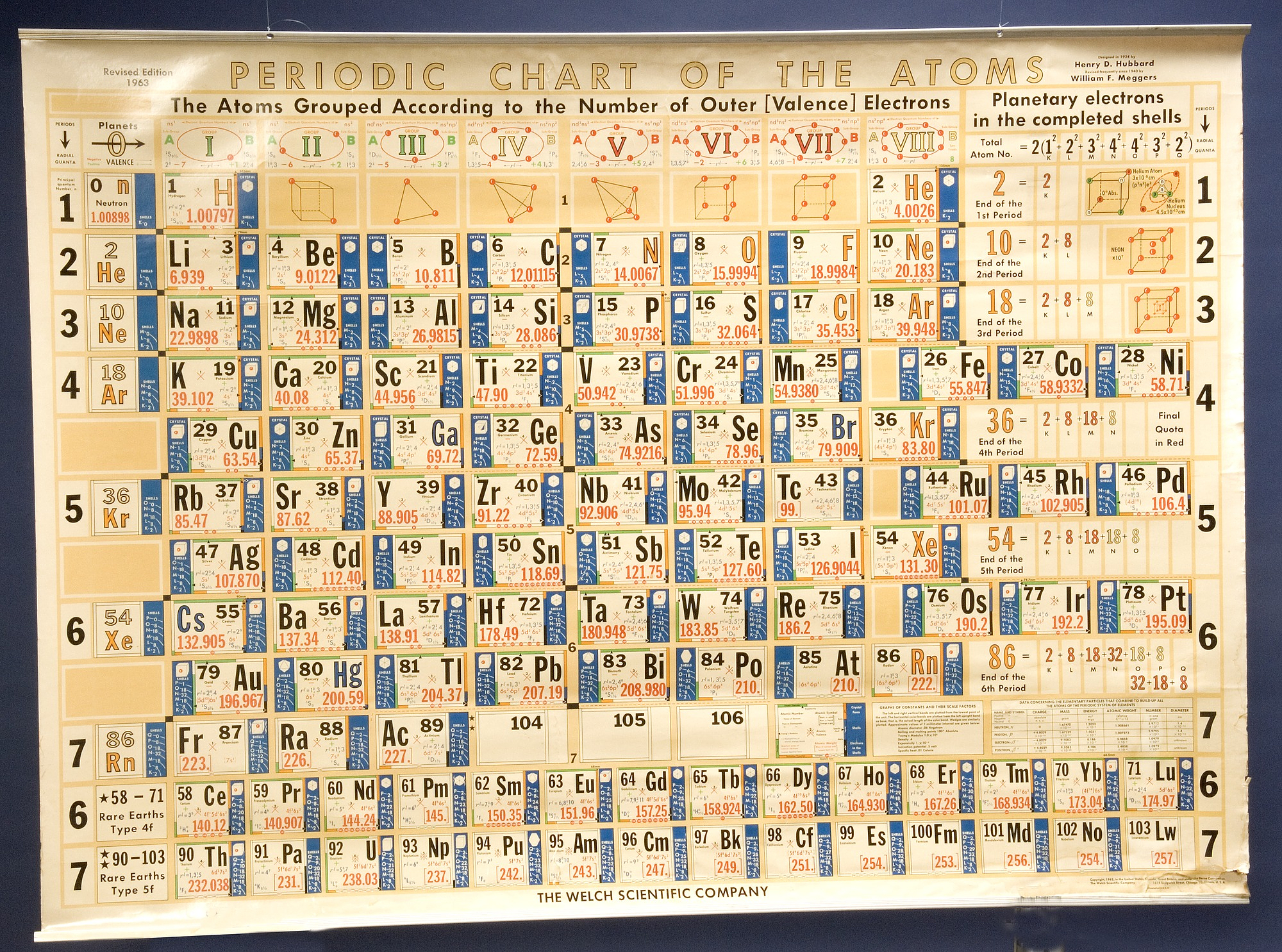
Hubbard's Periodic Chart of the Atoms (1963 version)

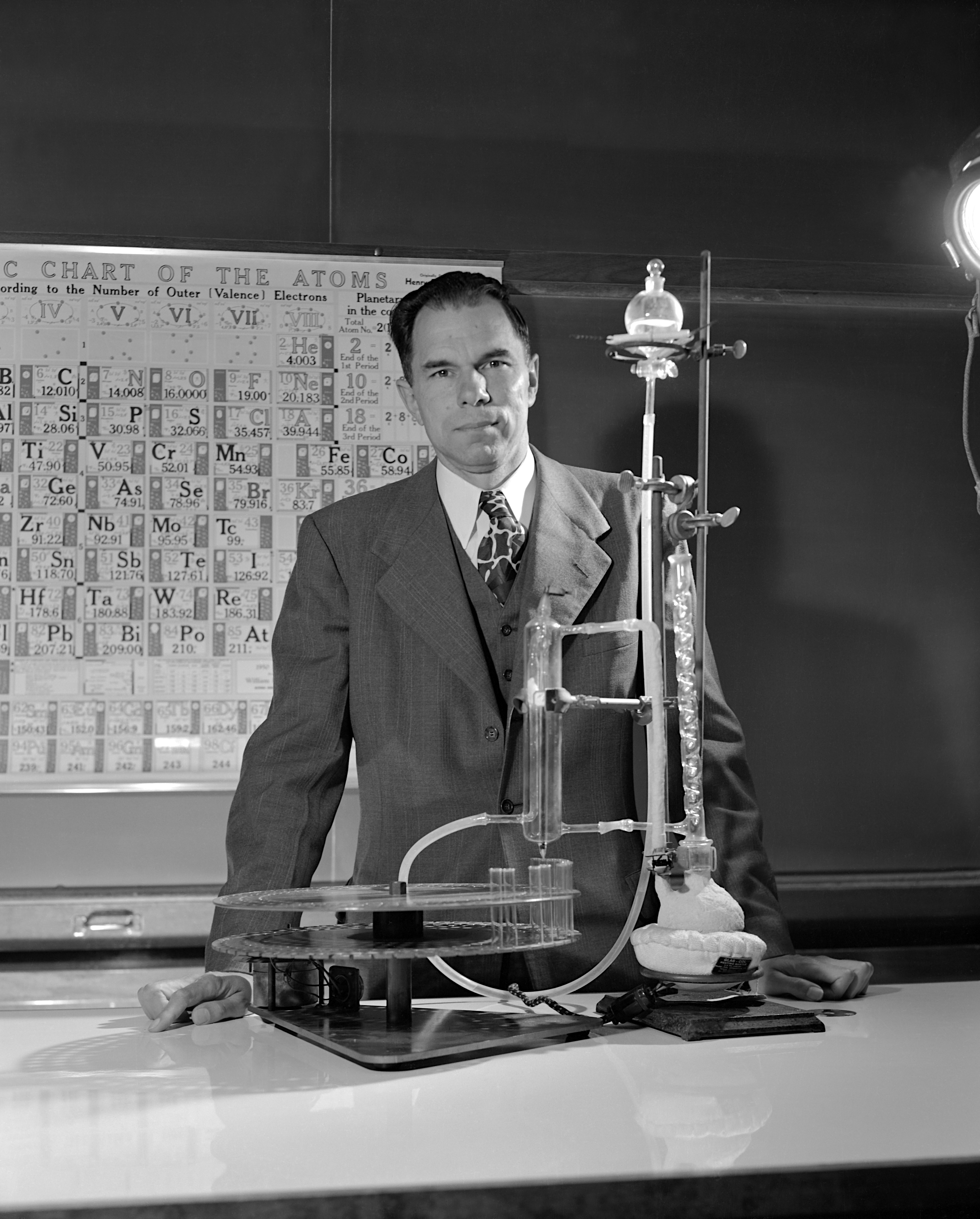
Glenn T. Seaborg in his Berkeley Laboratory, in front of a Hubbard periodic table chart (pictured 1950)
