= Close Hall =

Building in Iowa, United States

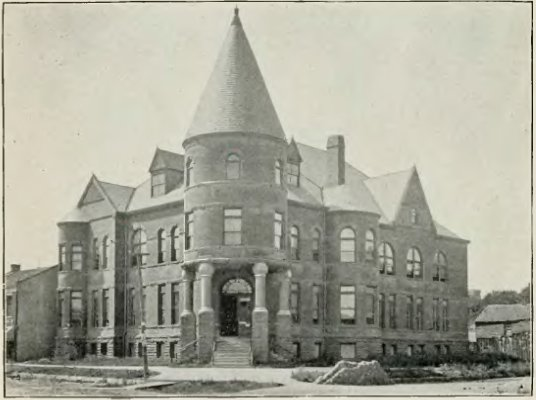
- Location: Dubuque Street and Iowa Avenue; Iowa City, Iowa, 52240 United States
- Owner: University of Iowa & Iowa City
- Operator: University of Iowa

Construction
- Opened: 1890
- Closed: 1968
- Demolished: 1970

Tenants
- The Daily Iowan newspaper YMCA & YWCA; University Physical Education; University Men's Basketball

Close Hall was a multi-purpose facility on the campus of the University of Iowa in Iowa City, Iowa, United States, that was opened in 1890 and demolished between 1968 and 1970. In 1896, Close Hall hosted the first collegiate five-on-five basketball game.

== Construction ==
Made of brick, construction of the building began in 1888 and completed in 1890 on land owned jointly by the university and Iowa City. The cost of construction was supplemented through a contribution of $10,000 by Mrs. Helen S. Close in order for the YM-YWCA to be completed.

The three-story building was the site of the first five-on-five college basketball game in 1896. The basement of the building housed the women's gymnasium as well as industrial chemistry labs. The first floor contained offices and recitation rooms, while the second floor housed literary societies as well as additional offices. The building became the first home of the Iowa Hawkeyes men's basketball team in its early years. The team would move to the first Iowa Armory in 1905.

Eventually the building would become the school of journalism for the University of Iowa and would house the campus typesetting machines and printing presses. It would be from these presses that The Daily Iowan, The Hawkeye, Frivol, Iowa Literary Magazine, The Transit and The Journal of Business would be printed. Close Hall would remain the home of the school of journalism as well as the university press room until the late 1950s.

=== Fire, rebuild and demolition ===
On January 1, 1940, Close Hall had a devastating fire that caused irreparable damage. The building was reconstructed as a one-story building and maintained as the school of journalism and university publishing. After the university publishing left, Close Hall became an underused, gaudy building on a valuable piece of property. The university officially closed the building in 1968 and over the course of the following two years demolished the structure.

Today, the University of Iowa's Biology Building East stands on the Close Hall former site at Dubuque Street and Iowa Avenue.
