= 1896 Chicago vs. Iowa men's basketball game =

1896 Chicago vs. Iowa game
First modern college basketball game
Chicago Maroons	Iowa Hawkeyes
(5–2)	(2–5)
15	12
Head coach: Horace Butterworth	Head coach: None
	1st half	Total
Chicago Maroons	15	15
Iowa Hawkeyes	12	12
- Date: January 18, 1896
- Venue: Close Hall, Iowa City
- Attendance: ~500

The 1896 Chicago vs. Iowa men's basketball game was the first five-on-five college basketball game played in United States history. Although the sport had been first played in 1892, seven to nine players had been used on a side. At the urging of the University of Chicago's head football coach, Amos Alonzo Stagg, Chicago's men's club team traveled to Iowa City, Iowa, to play the University of Iowa on January 18, 1896, in an experimental game. The match was played in Close Hall, and due to seating capacity constraints, only approximately 500 people were able to watch. Iowa physical education teacher Dr. Henry F. Kallenberg reduced the teams to five players on a side, and the modern version of basketball was born. Kallenberg came to Iowa from Springfield College, where he was a classmate of Dr. James Naismith, the inventor of basketball. Chicago won, 15–12, to secure modern college basketball's first-ever win.
