= 1896–97 Nebraska men's basketball team =

American college basketball season

1896–97 Nebraska men's basketball
- Conference: Independent
- Record: 2–0
- Head coach: Frank Lehmer (1st season)
- Home arena: Grant Memorial Hall

The 1896–97 Nebraska men's basketball team represented the University of Nebraska as an independent in the 1896–97 collegiate men's basketball season, Nebraska's first season of varsity basketball competition. The team was led by head coach Frank Lehmer and played both of its games at Grant Memorial Hall in Lincoln, Nebraska.

== Schedule ==
Date time, TV	Opponent	Result	Record	Site city, state
February 2, 1897	Lincoln YMCA	W 11–8	1–0	Grant Memorial Hall; Lincoln, NE
February 23, 1897	Lincoln YMCA	W 23–14	2–0	Grant Memorial Hall; Lincoln, NE
*Non-conference game. (#) Tournament seedings in parentheses.
