= 1896–97 Penn State Nittany Lions basketball team =

American college basketball season

1896–1897 Penn State Nittany Lions basketball
- Conference: Independent
- Record: 1–1
- Head coach: none
- Captain: M.R. Stevenson
- Home arena: Armory

The 1896–1897 Penn State Nittany Lions basketball team represented Penn State University during the 1896–97 college men's basketball season.

== Schedule ==
Date time, TV	Opponent	Result	Record	Site city, state
*	at Bucknell	L 4–24	0–1	Lewisburg, PA
*	Bucknell	W 10–7	1–1	The Armory; University Park, PA
*Non-conference game. (#) Tournament seedings in parentheses.
