= 1896–97 Butler Christians men's basketball team =

American college basketball season

1896–97 Butler Bulldogs men's basketball
- Conference: Independent
- Record: 1–0
- Head coach: Unknown

The 1896–97 Butler Christians men's basketball team represented Butler University during the 1896–97 college men's basketball season.

== Schedule ==
Date time, TV	Opponent	Result	Record	Site city, state
*	Y.M.C.A.	W 13–1	1–0	Indianapolis, IN
*Non-conference game. (#) Tournament seedings in parentheses.
