= 1895–96 Washington men's basketball team =

American college basketball season

1895–96 Washington men's basketball
- Conference: Independent
- Record: 1–1
- Captain: Jack Lindsay

The 1895–96 Washington Huskies men's basketball team represented the University of Washington during the 1895–96 college men's basketball season.

== Schedule ==
Date time, TV	Opponent	Result	Record	Site city, state
March 6*	Seattle AC	L 2–3 ^{OT}	0–1	Armory; Seattle, Washington
*	Seattle YMCA	W	1–1	Seattle, WA
*Non-conference game. (#) Tournament seedings in parentheses. Source:

== See also ==
- 1895–96 Washington women's basketball team
