= Central Penn College =

Private college in Enola, Pennsylvania, US

Coordinates: 40.305°N 76.933°W

- Type: Private for-profit college
- Established: 1881
- President: Linda Fedrizzi-Williams
- Students: 821
- Location: Enola, Pennsylvania, United States
- Campus: Suburban
- Colors: Maroon & orange
- Sporting affiliations: USCAA Division II
- Mascot: Knights
- Website: www.centralpenn.edu

Central Penn College (Central Penn or CPC) is a private for-profit college in Enola, Pennsylvania. Established in 1881, CPC offers associate degrees, bachelor's degrees, and a master's degree in Professional Studies. The college is accredited by the Middle States Commission on Higher Education. Central Penn College was originally known as Central Pennsylvania Business School. The school changed its name in 1999 to Central Pennsylvania College and then to Central Penn College in 2010.

== History ==
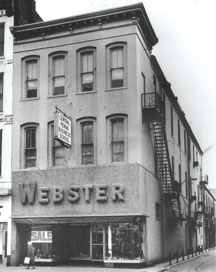
Market Street Location

Central Penn College was founded in 1881 under the name "Pennsylvania Business College". Its original location was on Market Street in Harrisburg. In 1970 the new president Bart Milano moved the Central Pennsylvania Business School, as it was known at that time, across the river to Enola where it continues to operate today.

== Campus ==
In 2002 the Advanced Technology Education Center opened. The new building doubled the number of academic classrooms on the Enola, PA campus. That same year 1869-vintage Henszey's Bridge, a 93-foot (28 m) wrought-iron bowstring arch/truss type, was refurbished and relocated to Central Penn from its previous home in Wanamakers, Pennsylvania. Responding to feedback from students for more recreational facilities, the college in 2014 opened The Underground, which contains a student union space, dance studio, fitness center, writing center and the Capital Blue Cross Theatre. Fall 2015 saw the opening of the Donald B. and Dorothy L. Stabler Health Sciences Building.

== Locations ==
=== Central Penn College Enola, PA (Harrisburg) campus ===
The campus comprises four academic buildings, the Charles "T" Jones Leadership Library, thirty-four student townhouses, six apartment buildings, a new Health Sciences Building, the Underground Student Union, and the Boyer House. The main campus is home to yearly events including the college's annual Fall Harvest (homecoming) event, as well as Festival of Nations and SummerFest.

=== Central Penn College Lancaster location (closed in 2023) ===
In 2004, Central Penn College opened its first additional location: the Lancaster Center.

The location operated until 2023 at which time it ceased operations.

=== Central Penn College Lehigh Valley location (closed in 2015) ===
In May 2009, Central Penn College opened a location in the Lehigh Valley at the Lehigh Valley Corporate Center in Bethlehem, PA. The location operated until the winter of 2015 at which time it ceased operations.

== Athletics ==
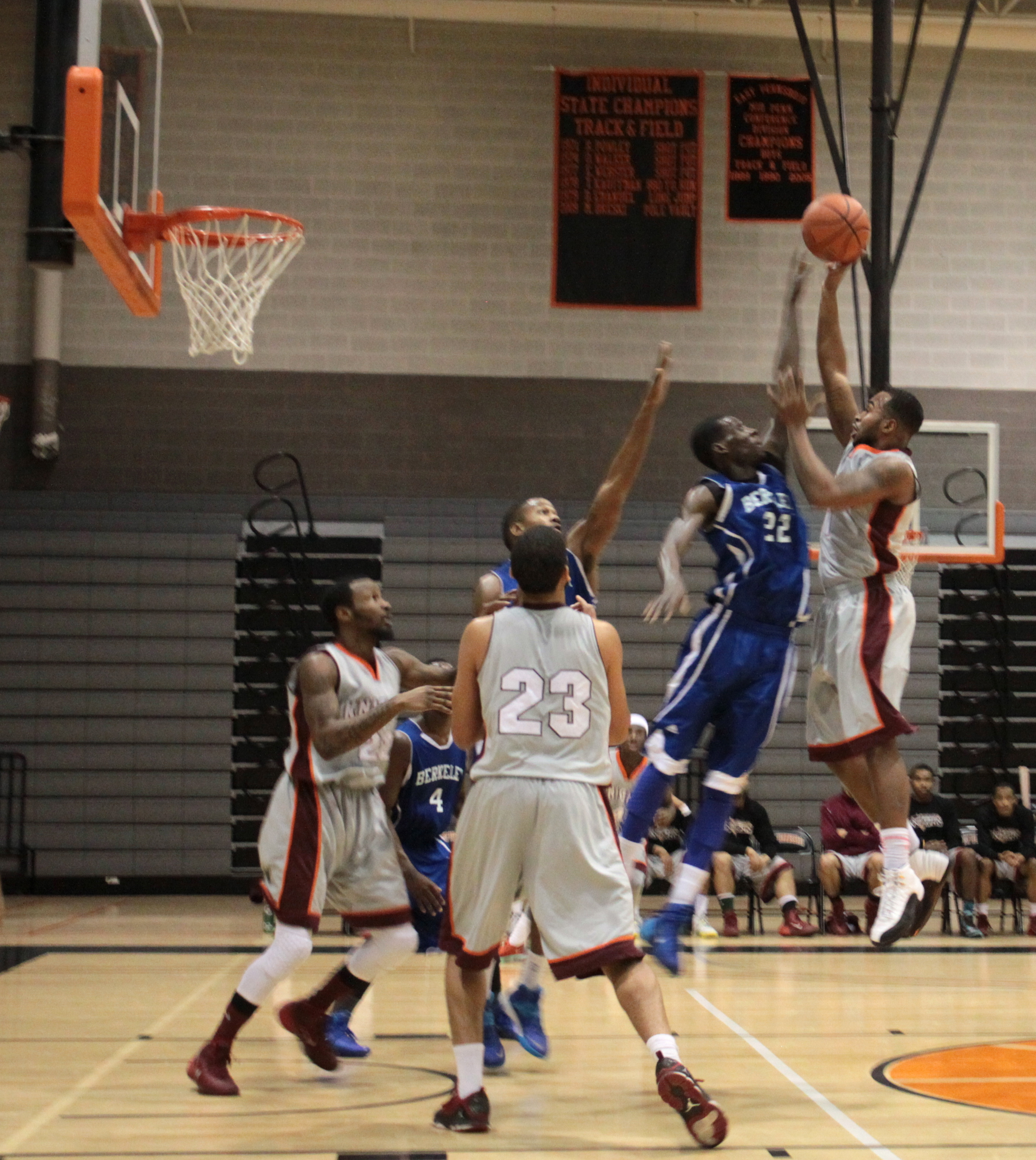
Central Penn College Knights Basketball

The Central Penn College Knights are in the United States Collegiate Athletic Association (USCAA) Division 2. Athletics are streamed by Knightly News Media, which began in 2018, including men's and women's basketball.

=== Men's sports ===
- Baseball
- Basketball
- Soccer
- Cross Country
- eSports

=== Women's sports ===
- Basketball
- Volleyball
- Soccer
- Cross Country
- Softball (coming 2025)
- eSports
