= List of Ohio State Buckeyes men's basketball seasons =

This is a list of seasons completed by the Ohio State men's college basketball team.

== Season-by-season results ==
Statistics overview
Season	Coach	Overall	Conference	Standing	Postseason
Unknown (Independent) (1898–1902)
1898–99	Unknown	12–4			
1899–1900	Unknown	8–4			
1900–01	Unknown	1–3			
1901–02	No Team				
Unknown:		21–11 (.656)			
D. C. Huddleson (Independent) (1902–1904)
1902–03	D. C. Huddleson	5–2			
1903–04	D. C. Huddleson	10–4			
D. C. Huddleson:		15–6 (.714)			
Unknown (Independent) (1904–1908)
1904–05	Unknown	12–2			
1905–06	Unknown	9–1			
1906–07	Unknown	7–5			
1907–08	Unknown	5–6			
Unknown:		33–14 (.702)			
Tom Kibler (Independent) (1908–1910)
1908–09	Tom Kibler	11–1			
1909–10	Tom Kibler	11–1			
Tom Kibler:		22–2 (.917)			
Sox Raymond (Independent) (1910–1911)
1910–11	Sox Raymond	6–3			
Sox Raymond:		6–3 (.667)			
Lynn St. John (Independent) (1911–1912)
1911–12	Lynn St. John	7–5			
Lynn St. John (Big Ten Conference) (1912–1919)
1912–13	Lynn St. John	12–8	4–5	6th	
1913–14	Lynn St. John	10–4	5–1	2nd	
1914–15	Lynn St. John	6–10	3–9	8th	
1915–16	Lynn St. John	9–13	2–8	8th	
1916–17	Lynn St. John	15–11	3–9	7th	
1917–18	Lynn St. John	13–7	5–5	T–7th	
1918–19	Lynn St. John	7–12	2–6	9th	
Lynn St. John:		79–70 (.530)	24–43 (.358)		
George Trautman (Big Ten Conference) (1919–1922)
1919–20	George Trautman	17–10	3–9	7th	
1920–21	George Trautman	4–13	2–10	9th	
1921–22	George Trautman	8–10	5–7	T–6th	
George Trautman:		29–33 (.468)	10–26 (.278)		
Harold Olsen (Big Ten Conference) (1922–1946)
1922–23	Harold Olsen	4–11	1–11	T–9th	
1923–24	Harold Olsen	12–5	7–5	T–4th	
1924–25	Harold Olsen	14–2	11–1	1st	
1925–26	Harold Olsen	10–7	6–6	T–5th	
1926–27	Harold Olsen	11–6	6–6	7th	
1927–28	Harold Olsen	5–12	3–9	7th	
1928–29	Harold Olsen	9–8	6–6	T–5th	
1929–30	Harold Olsen	9–15	1–9	9th	
1930–31	Harold Olsen	4–13	3–9	9th	
1931–32	Harold Olsen	9–9	5–7	6th	
1932–33	Harold Olsen	17–3	10–2	T–1st	
1933–34	Harold Olsen	8–12	4–8	8th	
1934–35	Harold Olsen	12–7	8–4	4th	
1935–36	Harold Olsen	12–8	5–7	6th	
1936–37	Harold Olsen	13–7	7–5	5th	
1937–38	Harold Olsen	12–8	5–5	3rd	
1938–39	Harold Olsen	16–7	9–2	1st	NCAA Runner-up
1939–40	Harold Olsen	13–7	7–4	3rd	
1940–41	Harold Olsen	10–10	7–5	3rd	
1941–42	Harold Olsen	6–14	4–11	9th	
1942–43	Harold Olsen	8–9	5–7	6th	
1943–44	Harold Olsen	14–7	10–2	1st	NCAA final Four
1944–45	Harold Olsen	15–5	10–2	2nd	NCAA final Four
1945–46	Harold Olsen	16–5	10–2	1st	NCAA final Four
Harold Olsen:		259–197 (.568)	154–135 (.533)		
Tippy Dye (Big Ten Conference) (1946–1950)
1946–47	Tippy Dye	7–13	5–7	6th	
1947–48	Tippy Dye	10–10	5–7	6th	
1948–49	Tippy Dye	14–7	6–6	4th	
1949–50	Tippy Dye	22–4	11–1	1st	NCAA Elite Eight
Tippy Dye:		53–34 (.609)	27–21 (.563)		
Floyd Stahl (Big Ten Conference) (1950–1958)
1950–51	Floyd Stahl	6–16	3–11	9th	
1951–52	Floyd Stahl	8–14	6–8	T–5th	
1952–53	Floyd Stahl	10–12	7–11	7th	
1953–54	Floyd Stahl	11–11	5–9	7th	
1954–55	Floyd Stahl	10–12	4–10	10th	
1955–56	Floyd Stahl	16–6	9–5	3rd	
1956–57	Floyd Stahl	14–8	9–5	T–3rd	
1957–58	Floyd Stahl	9–13	8–6	4th	
Floyd Stahl:		84–92 (.477)	51–65 (.440)		
Fred Taylor (Big Ten Conference) (1958–1976)
1958–59	Fred Taylor	11–11	7–7	T–5th	
1959–60	Fred Taylor	25–3	13–1	1st	NCAA University Division Champion
1960–61	Fred Taylor	27–1	14–0	1st	NCAA University Division Runner-up
1961–62	Fred Taylor	26–2	13–1	1st	NCAA University Division Runner-up
1962–63	Fred Taylor	20–4	11–3	T–1st	
1963–64	Fred Taylor	16–8	11–3	T–1st	
1964–65	Fred Taylor	12–12	6–8	6th	
1965–66	Fred Taylor	11–13	5–9	8th	
1966–67	Fred Taylor	13–11	6–8	T–7th	
1967–68	Fred Taylor	21–8	10–4	T–1st	NCAA University Division Final Four
1968–69	Fred Taylor	17–7	9–5	T–2nd	
1969–70	Fred Taylor	17–7	8–6	T–3rd	
1970–71	Fred Taylor	20–6	13–1	1st	NCAA University Division Elite Eight
1971–72	Fred Taylor	18–6	10–4	2nd	
1972–73	Fred Taylor	14–10	8–6	T–3rd	
1973–74	Fred Taylor	9–15	4–10	8th	
1974–75	Fred Taylor	14–14	8–10	6th	
1975–76	Fred Taylor	6–20	2–16	10th	
Fred Taylor:		297–158 (.653)	158–102 (.608)		
Eldon Miller (Big Ten Conference) (1976–1986)
1976–77	Eldon Miller	9–18	4–14	10th	
1977–78	Eldon Miller	16–11	9–9	6th	
1978–79	Eldon Miller	19–12	12–6	4th	NIT Fourth Place
1979–80	Eldon Miller	21–8	12–6	2nd	NCAA Division I Sweet Sixteen
1980–81	Eldon Miller	14–13	9–9	T–5th	
1981–82	Eldon Miller	21–10	12–6	T–2nd	NCAA Division I first round
1982–83	Eldon Miller	20–10	11–7	T–2nd	NCAA Division I Sweet Sixteen
1983–84	Eldon Miller	15–14	8–10	T–5th	NIT first round
1984–85	Eldon Miller	20–10	11–7	T–3rd	NCAA Division I second round
1985–86	Eldon Miller	19–14	8–10	7th	NIT Champion
Eldon Miller:		174–120 (.592)	96–84 (.533)		
Gary Williams (Big Ten Conference) (1986–1989)
1986–87	Gary Williams	20–13	9–9	6th	NCAA Division I second round
1987–88	Gary Williams	20–13	9–9	6th	NIT Runner-up
1988–89	Gary Williams	19–15	6–12	6th	NIT Quarterfinal
Gary Williams:		59–41 (.590)	24–30 (.444)		
Randy Ayers (Big Ten Conference) (1989–1997)
1989–90	Randy Ayers	17–13	10–8	6th	NCAA Division I second round
1990–91	Randy Ayers	27–4	15–3	T–1st	NCAA Division I Sweet Sixteen
1991–92	Randy Ayers	26–6	15–3	1st	NCAA Division I Elite Eight
1992–93	Randy Ayers	15–13	8–10	7th	NIT first round
1993–94	Randy Ayers	13–16	6–12	T–8th	
1994–95	Randy Ayers	6–22	2–16	10th	
1995–96	Randy Ayers	10–17	3–15	10th	
1996–97	Randy Ayers	10–17	5–13	9th	
Randy Ayers:		124–108 (.534)	64–80 (.444)		
Jim O'Brien (Big Ten Conference) (1997–2004)
1997–98	Jim O'Brien	8–22	1–15	11th	
1998–99	Jim O'Brien	27–9^{[Note A]}	12–4^{[Note A]}	2nd^{[Note A]}	NCAA Division I Final Four
1999–00	Jim O'Brien	23–7^{[Note B]}	13–3^{[Note B]}	T–1st^{[Note B]}	NCAA Division I second round
2000–01	Jim O'Brien	20–11^{[Note C]}	11–5^{[Note C]}	3rd^{[Note C]}	NCAA Division I first round
2001–02	Jim O'Brien	24–8^{[Note D]}	11–5^{[Note D]}	T–1st^{[Note D]}	NCAA Division I second round
2002–03	Jim O'Brien	17–15	7–9	T–8th	NIT first round
2003–04	Jim O'Brien	14–16	6–10	9th	
Jim O'Brien:		133–88 (.602)^{[Note E]}	61–51 (.545)^{[Note E]}		
Thad Matta (Big Ten Conference) (2004–2017)
2004–05	Thad Matta	20–12	8–8	6th	
2005–06	Thad Matta	26–6	12–4	1st	NCAA Division I second round
2006–07	Thad Matta	34–4	15–1	1st	NCAA Division I Runner-up
2007–08	Thad Matta	24–13	10–8	5th	NIT Champion
2008–09	Thad Matta	22–11	10–8	5th	NCAA Division I first round
2009–10	Thad Matta	29–8	14–4	T–1st	NCAA Division I Sweet Sixteen
2010–11	Thad Matta	34–3	16–2	1st	NCAA Division I Sweet Sixteen
2011–12	Thad Matta	31–8	13–5	T–1st	NCAA Division I Final Four
2012–13	Thad Matta	29–8	13–5	2nd	NCAA Division I Elite Eight
2013–14	Thad Matta	25–10	10–8	5th	NCAA Division I second round
2014–15	Thad Matta	24–11	11–7	6th	NCAA Division I second round
2015–16	Thad Matta	21–14	11–7	7th	NIT second round
2016–17	Thad Matta	17–15	7–11	T–10th	
Thad Matta:		337–123 (.733)	150–78 (.658)		
Chris Holtmann (Big Ten Conference) (2018–2024)
2017–18	Chris Holtmann	25–9	15–3	T–2nd	NCAA Division I second round
2018–19	Chris Holtmann	20–15	8–12	8th	NCAA Division I second round
2019–20	Chris Holtmann	21–10	11–9	T–5th	No postseason held
2020–21	Chris Holtmann	21–10	12–8	5th	NCAA Division I first round
2021–22	Chris Holtmann	20–12	12–8	T–4th	NCAA Division I second round
2022–23	Chris Holtmann	16–19	5–15	13th	
2023–24	Chris Holtmann/Jake Diebler	22–14	9–11	T–9th	NIT Quarterfinals
Chris Holtmann:		137–86 (.614)	67–65 (.508)		
Jake Diebler (Big Ten Conference) (2024–present)
2024–25	Jake Diebler	17–15	9–11	10th	
2025–26	Jake Diebler	21–13	12–8	8th	NCAA Division I first round
Jake Diebler:		46–31 (.597)	26–20 (.565)		
Total:		1,826–1,186 (.606)			
National champion Postseason invitational champion Conference regular season champion Conference regular season and conference tournament champion Division regular season champion Division regular season and conference tournament champion Conference tournament champion

^A 34 games vacated by the NCAA (overall record of 27–9, conference record of 12–4). Adjusted record is 1–1 and 1–1 in conference.
^B 16 games vacated by the NCAA, as well as conference regular season championship (overall record of 22–7, conference record of 13–3). Adjusted record is 11–3 and 5–1 in conference.
^C Entire season vacated by the NCAA (overall record of 20–11, conference record of 11–5)
^D Entire season vacated by the NCAA, as well as conference regular season and tournament championship (overall record of 24–8, conference record of 11–5)
^E O'Brien's unofficial record is 133–88 at Ohio State; his adjusted record is 51–57 and 20–36 in conference.
