= List of Ohio State Buckeyes men's basketball head coaches =

The following is a list of Ohio State Buckeyes men's basketball head coaches. The Ohio State Buckeyes men's basketball team has had 16 head coaches.

No.	Tenure	Coach	Years	Record	Pct.
–	1898–1901	Unknown coach	3	21–11	.656
1	1902–1904	D. C. Huddleson	2	15–6	.714
–	1904–1908	Unknown coach	4	33–14	.702
2	1908–1910	Thomas Kibler	2	22–2	.917
3	1910–1911	Stockton A. "Sox" Raymond	1	6–3	.667
4	1911–1919	Lynn St. John	8	79–70	.530
5	1919–1922	George Trautman	3	29–33	.468
6	1922–1946	Harold Olsen	24	259–197	.568
7	1946–1950	Tippy Dye	4	53–34	.609
8	1950–1958	Floyd Stahl	8	84–92	.477
9	1958–1976	Fred Taylor	18	297–158	.653
10	1976–1986	Eldon Miller	10	174–120	.592
11	1986–1989	Gary Williams	3	59–41	.590
12	1989–1997	Randy Ayers	8	124–108	.534
13	1997–2004	Jim O’Brien	7	133–88	.602
14	2004–2017	Thad Matta	13	337–123	.733
15	2017–2024	Chris Holtmann	7	137–86	.614
16	2024–present	Jake Diebler	2	25–18	.581
Totals		16 coaches	115 seasons	1,787–1,169	.605
Records updated through end of 2024–25 season

Jim O'Brien has 113 games vacated by the NCAA. His official record at Ohio State is 51–57 (.472).
