= 1898–99 collegiate men's basketball season in the United States =

American college basketball season

The 1898–99 collegiate men's basketball season in the United States began in December 1898, progressed through the regular season, and concluded in April 1899.

== Season headlines ==
- The 1898 edition of Spalding's Official Basket Ball Guide — published in October 1898 — critiqued a proposal published in the April 1893 issue of Physical Education for the formation of three basketball leagues made up of YMCAs, colleges, and amateur athletic clubs to each compete for a "Trophy or Championship Emblem" conveying upon each winner a national championship, followed by a "triangular contest for the Supreme Championship" among the three national champions. The 1898 Spalding's Guide noted that the 1893 proposal was premature, "for it wasn't until 1895 that the athletic clubs gave the game its due recognition, and even up to the present time comparatively few colleges are interested in the game."
- Yale claimed that it had won a mythical "basket ball championship of the United States" for the 1898–99 season.
- In 1995, the Premo-Porretta Power Poll retroactively selected Yale as its top-ranked team for the 1898–99 season.

== Regular season ==
During the season, college teams played against non-collegiate opponents such as athletic clubs, high schools, and Young Men's Christian Association (YMCA) teams as well as against other colleges and universities.

=== Western Conference ===
The Western Conference (the future Big Ten Conference) was the only college basketball conference. It did not sponsor an official conference season or recognize a regular-season champion, and no intramural games between conference members took place during the 1898–99 season. In non-conference play, only Minnesota (5–4) won games.

1898–99 Western Conference men's basketball standings
	Conf.				Overall
Team	W		L	PCT	W		L	PCT
Minnesota†		–		–	5	–	4	.556
Wisconsin		–		–	0	–	3	.000
† Intramural play only, the conference did not have an official championship winner

=== Independents ===
A total of 27 college teams played as major independents. Most played fewer than 10 games. Those that won 10 or more games were Bloomsburg (10–0), West Chester (11–1), Ohio State (12–4), and Temple (18–6).

1898–99 collegiate men's basketball independents standings
	Conf.				Overall
Team	W		L	PCT	W		L	PCT
Bloomsburg		–		–	10	–	0	1.000
Illinois State		–		–	2	–	0	1.000
Nebraska		–		–	4	–	0	1.000
Notre Dame		–		–	2	–	0	1.000
Syracuse		–		–	1	–	0	1.000
Wabash		–		–	2	–	0	1.000
Widener		–		–	1	–	0	1.000
West Chester		–		–	11	–	1	.917
Allegheny		–		–	8	–	1	.889
Yale		–		–	9	–	2	.818
Hiram		–		–	4	–	1	.800
Ohio State		–		–	12	–	4	.750
Temple		–		–	18	–	6	.750
Wisconsin–Stevens Point		–		–	6	–	2	.750
Macalester		–		–	7	–	3	.700
Kansas		–		–	7	–	4	.636
North Dakota State		–		–	2	–	2	.500
Washington		–		–	1	–	1	.500
Mount Union		–		–	2	–	3	.400
Penn State		–		–	2	–	3	.400
Bucknell		–		–	3	–	5	.375
Geneva		–		–	3	–	6	.333
Westminster College		–		–	2	–	4	.333
Cornell		–		–	1	–	3	.250
Butler		–		–	0	–	2	.000
Grove City		–		–	0	–	2	.000
Michigan State		–		–	0	–	2	.000
