= Ohio State Buckeyes men's basketball =

Men's basketball team of Ohio State University

2026–27 Ohio State Buckeyes men's basketball team
- University: Ohio State University
- First season: 1898–99; 128 years ago
- Athletic director: Ross Bjork
- Head coach: Jake Diebler; 3rd season, 46–31 (.597)
- Location: Columbus, Ohio
- Arena: Value City Arena (18,809); St. John Arena (secondary; 13,276)
- NCAA division: Division I
- Conference: Big Ten
- Nickname: Buckeyes
- Colors: Scarlet and gray
- Student section: Nuthouse
- All-time record: 1,906–1,209 (.612)
- NCAA tournament record: 58–34 (.630)

NCAA Division I tournament champions
- 1960
Other NCAA Division I tournament results
Runner-up	1939, 1961, 1962, 2007
Third place	1944, 1945, 1946, 1968
Final Four	1939, 1944, 1945, 1946, 1960, 1961, 1962, 1968, 1999*, 2007, 2012
Elite Eight	1939, 1944, 1945, 1946, 1950, 1960, 1961, 1962, 1968, 1971, 1992, 1999*, 2007, 2012, 2013
Sweet Sixteen	1960, 1961, 1962, 1968, 1971, 1980, 1983, 1991, 1992, 1999*, 2007, 2010, 2011, 2012, 2013
Appearances	1939, 1944, 1945, 1946, 1950, 1960, 1961, 1962, 1968, 1971, 1980, 1982, 1983, 1985, 1987, 1990, 1991, 1992, 1999*, 2000*, 2001*, 2002*, 2006, 2007, 2009, 2010, 2011, 2012, 2013, 2014, 2015, 2018, 2019, 2021, 2022, 2026

NIT champions
- 1986, 2008

Conference tournament champions
- Big Ten: 2002*, 2007, 2010, 2011, 2013

Conference regular-season champions
- Big Ten: 1925, 1933, 1939, 1944, 1946, 1950, 1960, 1961, 1962, 1963, 1964, 1968, 1971, 1991, 1992, 2000*, 2002*, 2006, 2007, 2010, 2011, 2012

Uniforms
Home	Away	Alternate
- * vacated by NCAA

The Ohio State Buckeyes men's basketball team represents Ohio State University in NCAA Division I college basketball competition. The Buckeyes are a member of the Big Ten Conference.

The Buckeyes play their home games at Value City Arena in the Jerome Schottenstein Center in Columbus, Ohio, which opened in 1998. The official capacity of the center is 19,200. Ohio State ranked 28th in the nation in average home attendance as of the 2016 season.

The Buckeyes have won one national championship (1960), been the national runner-up four times, appeared in 10 Final Fours (one additional appearance has been vacated by the NCAA), and appeared in 27 NCAA Tournaments (four other appearances have been vacated).

Thad Matta was named the head coach of Ohio State in 2004 to replace coach Jim O'Brien, who was fired due to NCAA violations which made Ohio State vacate 113 games between 1998 and 2002. On June 5, 2017, after consecutive years of missing the NCAA Tournament, the school announced Matta would not return as head coach after 13 years and 337 wins at Ohio State. On June 9, 2017, the school hired Butler head coach Chris Holtmann as head coach.

The program is presently led by Jake Diebler, Holtmann's former assistant coach who was initially hired as an interim coach following Holtmann's firing in 2024.

== Team history ==
=== Early years and Olsen era (1898–1958) ===
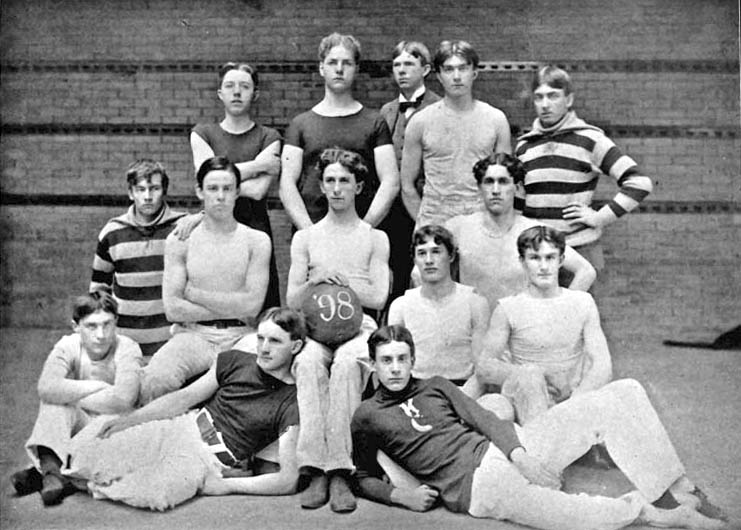
The first basketball team of Ohio State, formed in 1898

The first basketball team at Ohio State University was formed in 1898, playing its first game against East High. Sparing success followed the Buckeyes throughout their time as an independent school. In 1912, some 13 years after forming their first basketball team, the Buckeyes joined the Big Nine Conference, which would eventually be known as the Big Ten. At first, the Buckeyes were not able to mount a sustained run, never finishing higher than second in the conference standings. In 1923, Harold Olsen became head coach, launching the longest basketball coaching dynasty for OSU (24 seasons). Olsen began to see success with the Buckeyes' first conference championship during the 1922–1923 season. The Olsen era is also highlighted by appearing in the national championship game for the first NCAA Championship tournament in 1939, where the Buckeyes lost to Oregon 33–46. The Buckeyes would make three more Final Four appearances under Olsen, along with winning five Big Ten championships. Following Olsen as head coach, Tippy Dye and Floyd Stahl led the Buckeyes. Not seeing the same amount of success as Olsen did, Dye and Stahl had one NCAA Tournament appearance between them. With the closing of the 1950s, the Ohio State basketball team was not considered a national powerhouse. But it continued to develop and led to the hiring of a man who would change basketball at Ohio State and bring it national fame.

=== Success and Fred Taylor era (1958–1997) ===
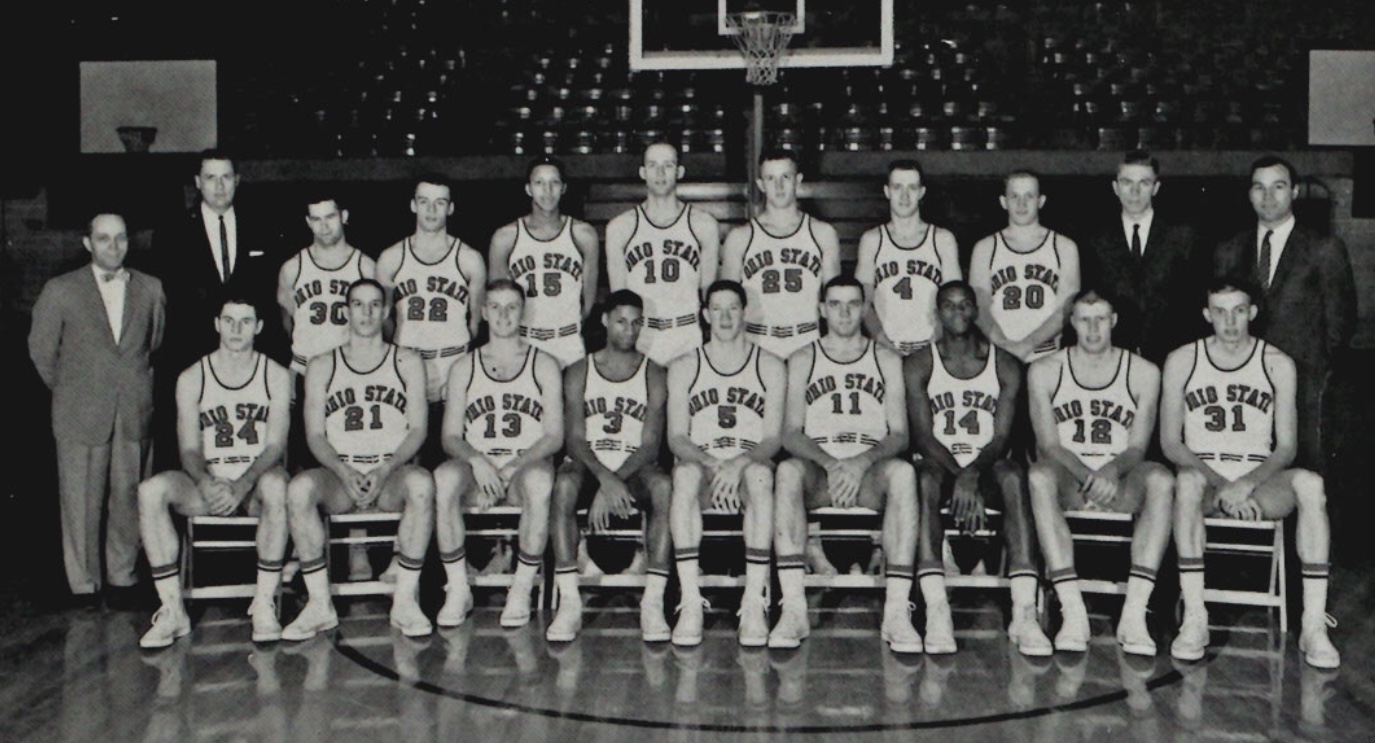
The Buckeyes’ 1960 national championship team.

Of all Buckeye coaches, it was Fred Taylor who would put Ohio State basketball on the map. With the hiring of Taylor in 1958, not much was expected following an 11–11 record during the 1958–1959 season. However, in 1960, the second-year coach, Taylor, and future Naismith Memorial Basketball Hall of Fame players Jerry Lucas and John Havlicek led the Buckeyes to their first national championship, defeating California 75–55 in the final game. The 1960 season is the only NCAA Tournament championship that the Buckeyes have claimed. Taylor's team returned to the national championship game in both 1961 and 1962, but they would lose both to in-state foe Cincinnati. The Buckeyes made a total of five tournament appearances during Taylor's 18 seasons tenure, which included four trips to the Final Four (1960, 1961, 1962, 1968). With the departure of his championship team, Taylor began to see teams accustomed to Ohio State basketball of the past. Taylor's last season at Ohio State in 1976 had the Buckeyes going 6–20, their worst record, only to be eclipsed by the team in 1995. Taylor achieved seven conference titles and an impressive overall winning percentage of over 65%. Past the Taylor era, Ohio State saw Eldon Miller, Gary Williams, and Randy Ayers take the reins as head coach. Between 1976 and 1997, the Buckeyes made the NCAA bracket only eight times, while being crowned conference champions only twice.

=== Jim O'Brien (1997–2004) ===
In 1997, Jim O'Brien was hired to replace head coach Randy Ayers. During his seven years as head coach, O'Brien drove the team to four 20+ win seasons, two Big Ten regular season co-championships, the 2002 Big Ten tournament championship, and a school record four-consecutive NCAA tournament appearances. Controversy erupted when Ohio State athletic director Andy Geiger fired O'Brien over alleged NCAA rules violations. A two-year NCAA investigation found that player Boban Savovic might have received improper benefits while he played for Ohio State. On March 10, 2006, the NCAA gave Ohio State three years' probation and ordered it to pay back all tournament money earned from 1999–2002 when Boban Savovic was on the Buckeyes' roster. In addition, Ohio State was forced to remove all references to team accomplishments by the NCAA directorate from those years including a 1999 visit to the Final Four.

=== Thad Matta era (2004–2017) ===
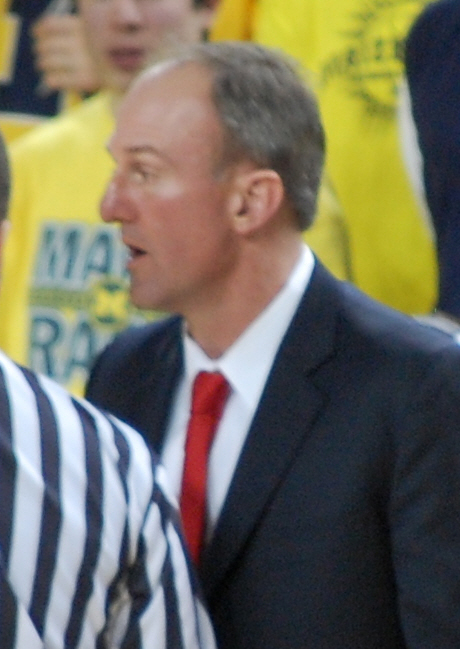
Former head coach Thad Matta, whose 337 wins is most in school history.

Thad Matta, former head coach at Butler and Xavier, was hired by Ohio State in July 2004.

During Matta's first season at Ohio State, the Buckeyes compiled a 20–12 record, highlighted by a win in the final game of the season over top-ranked Illinois, which was undefeated up until that game. Ohio State was defeated by Wisconsin in the Big Ten tournament quarterfinals, and the team was ineligible for further postseason due to self-imposed sanctions related to Jim O'Brien's time at the school. The 2005–06 season opened with the Buckeyes 11–0 heading into Big Ten play. Ohio State ended the season with a 26–6 record and 12–4 record in conference, the Buckeyes' first outright Big Ten championship since the 1991–92 season. Ohio State lost to Iowa in the Big Ten tournament championship game, but received a No. 2 seed in the NCAA tournament. After a first round win, the Buckeyes lost to No. 7 seed Georgetown 70–52 in the second round.

Matta's 2006–07 Ohio State team entered the season with the second-rated recruiting class in the nation, headed by Greg Oden and Mike Conley Jr., and ranked No. 4 in the preseason polls. Ohio State entered conference play with an 11–2 record, with the only defeats coming at No. 6 North Carolina and at No. 4 Florida. Ohio State's loss against No. 4 Wisconsin on January 9, 2007, was the last loss of the regular season as the Buckeyes won 14 straight games to end the season with a 27–3 record. Ohio State defeated No. 20 Tennessee and No. 2 Wisconsin during this winning streak and ended the season as the top-ranked team in the nation. Ohio State won the Big Ten tournament, defeating Wisconsin 66–49 in the championship game, and entered the NCAA tournament as the overall No. 1 seed. Ohio State advanced to the Sweet Sixteen for the first time under Matta after an overtime victory against Xavier, which Matta had previously coached. A one-point victory over Tennessee and a 92–76 victory over No. 2 Memphis advanced the Buckeyes to the Final Four. Ohio State defeated Georgetown 67–60 in the national semifinal, but lost to Florida 84–75 in the national championship game. Oden and Conley both would enter the NBA draft following the season, with Oden being drafted number one overall and Conley going fourth.

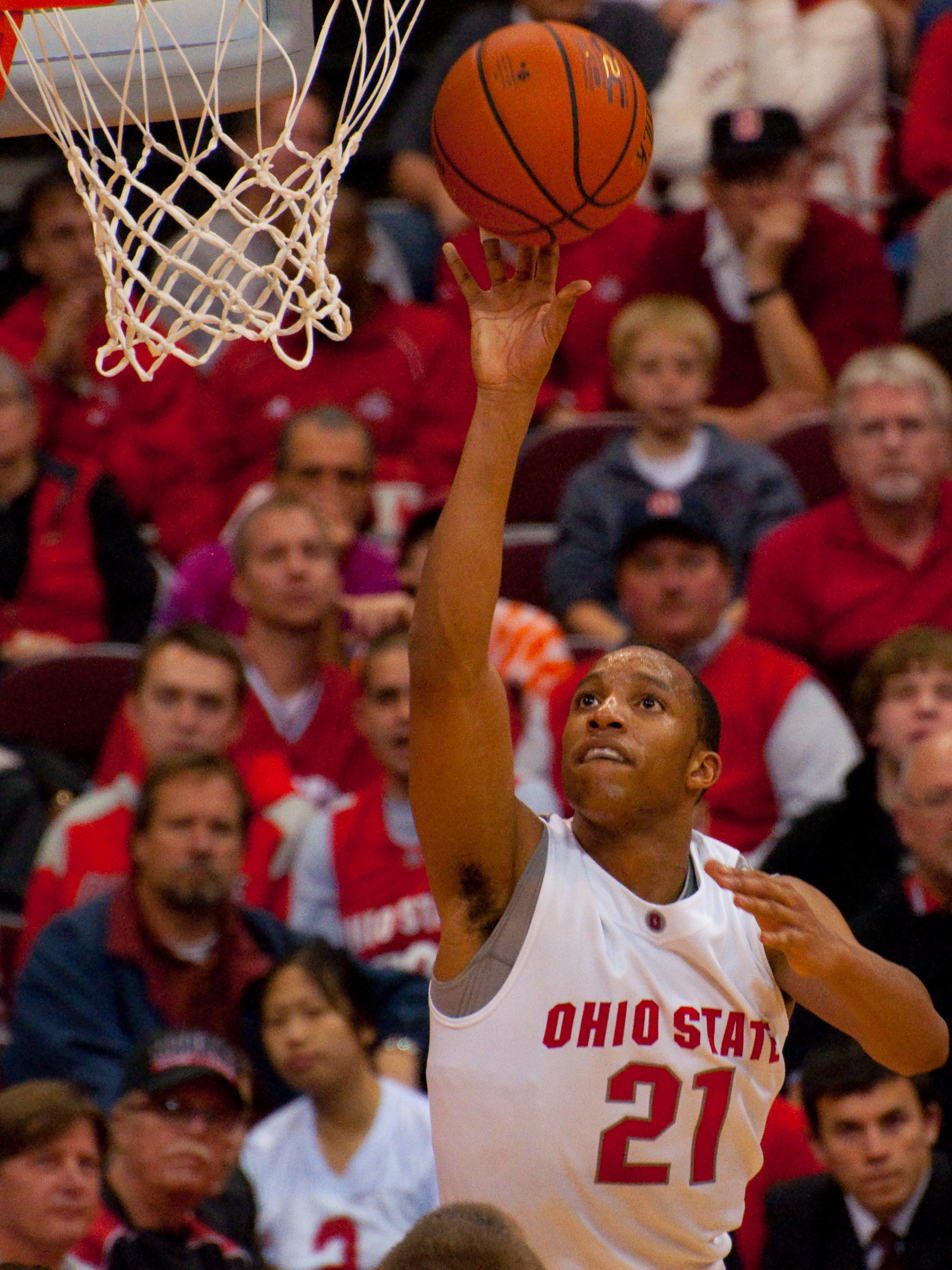
Evan "The Villain" Turner set new Big Ten records for number of career and single season Player of the Week awards during the 2009–10 season.

The 2007–08 season was a rebuilding one. Ohio State ended the season with a 19–12 record, finishing fifth in the Big Ten. It lost to Michigan State in the Big Ten tournament quarterfinals and missed out on the NCAA tournament. The Buckeyes did receive a No. 1 seed in the National Invitation Tournament, where Ohio State would defeat Massachusetts 92–85 in the championship to take the NIT title.

Ohio State began the 2008–09 season with a 9–0 record and would finish 20–9. Ohio State defeated Wisconsin and No. 7 Michigan State to advance to the Big Ten tournament championship, where the Buckeyes lost to No. 24 Purdue. They received a bid to the NCAA tournament as a No. 8 seed, where they lost to No. 9 Siena in the first round.

The 2009–10 season marked Matta's sixth at Ohio State, with the team entering the season ranked No. 17 in the nation. The Buckeyes had compiled a 7–1 record before Evan Turner, who was averaging 20.6 points and 12.9 rebounds per game, was injured. Turner returned later in the season and help finish the season with a 24–7 record and a share of the Big Ten regular season championship. A victory over Minnesota in the Big Ten tournament gave Matta his second Big Ten tournament title and the Buckeyes a No. 2 seed in the NCAA tournament. Ohio State advanced to the Sweet Sixteen before losing to No. 6-seeded Tennessee 76–73. Turner was named the National Player of the Year and entered the NBA draft, where he was selected second overall.

Matta's recruiting class heading into the 2010–11 season was highly regard and the Buckeyes returned some key seniors such as David Lighty and Jon Diebler. Ohio State was ranked No. 4 in the preseason polls and entered Big Ten conference play undefeated at 13–0, defeating No. 9 Florida and moving up to No. 2 in the nation. Ohio State continued to dominate the opposition during the regular season, pushing its record to 24–0 and 11–0 in conference play before losing the first game at No. 13 Wisconsin. Another loss at No. 11 Purdue marked their last loss in the regular season. Ohio State ended the season with a 29–2 record and 16–2 record in the Big Ten, winning the outright Big Ten regular season championship. OSU defeated Penn State for the Big Ten tournament championship, giving the Buckeyes their second tournament championship in a row and Matta's third tournament championship as head coach. Ohio State entered the NCAA tournament as the No. 1 overall seed for the second time under Matta. However, for the second year in a row, the Buckeyes failed to advance past the Sweet Sixteen, losing to Kentucky 62–60.

The Buckeyes, led by returning starters Jared Sullinger, Deshaun Thomas and Aaron Craft, entered the 2011–12 season ranked No. 3 in the nation. Ohio State entered Big Ten play with a 12–1 record, losing at No. 13 Kansas without Sullinger, who was injured. Ohio State finished the season winning a share of the Big Ten regular season championship and lost to Michigan State in the Big Ten tournament championship. Ohio State received a No. 2 seed in the NCAA tournament and advanced to the Final Four for the second time under Matta after a 77–70 victory over No. 1-seeded Syracuse. The Buckeye season would end with another loss to Kansas, 64–62. Following the season, Sullinger entered the NBA draft and was taken 21st overall.

The 2012–13 Buckeyes entered the season ranked No. 4 in the country. Led by Deshaun Thomas and Aaron Craft, they entered Big Ten play with only two losses, at No. 2 Duke and at home against No. 9 Kansas. They finished the season 13–5 in Big Ten play to finish in a tie for second place, but would beat No. 8 Michigan State and No. 22 Wisconsin to win the Big Ten tournament. As a No. 2 seed in the NCAA tournament, they advanced to the Elite Eight before losing to Wichita State. Following the season, Thomas declared for the NBA draft.

With the early departure of Thomas, the Buckeyes struggled in 2013–14, finishing the season 25–10, 10–8 in fifth place in Big Ten play. They advanced to the semifinals of the Big Ten tournament before losing to Michigan. As a No. 6 seed in the NCAA tournament, they lost to Dayton in the second round (formerly known as the first round).

The 2015 Buckeyes were led by freshman D'Angelo Russell, but still finished in sixth place in Big Ten play with an 11–7 record. Despite losing to Michigan State in the quarterfinals of the Big Ten tournament, OSU received a No. 10 seed in the NCAA tournament. They upset No. 7-seeded VCU in the second round, before losing to No. 5 Arizona in the third round. Following the season, Russell declared for the NBA draft and was selected second overall.

Without Russell, the 2016 Buckeyes finished 21–14, 11–7 in Big Ten play to finish in seventh place. They lost in the quarterfinals of the Big Ten tournament to Michigan State and failed to receive an invite to the NCAA tournament. They did receive a bid to the NIT, where they lost in the second round to Florida.

In 2016–17, OSU finished the season 17–15, 7–11 in Big Ten play to finish in a tie for 10th place. As the No. 11 seed in the Big Ten tournament, the Buckeyes lost in the first round to Rutgers. They did not receive an invite to a postseason tournament.

In a surprise move more than two months after the season ended, the school announced that, after failing to make the NCAA Tournament in 2016 and 2017, Matta would not return as head coach for the 2017–18 season. Ohio State won 20 or more games in 12 of Matta's 13 seasons, received a berth in the NCAA Tournament eight times, made it to the Sweet Sixteen four times, and to the Final Four twice. Ohio State won the Big Ten regular-season championship five times and Big Ten tournament championship four times, appearing in the championship game six times under Matta.

Thad Matta's record at Ohio State

Record table
Season	Coach	Overall	Conference	Standing	Postseason
Thad Matta (Big Ten Conference) (2004–2017)
2004–05	Ohio State	20–12	8–8	6th	
2005–06	Ohio State	26–6	12–4	1st	NCAA second round
2006–07	Ohio State	35–4	15–1	1st	NCAA Runner-up
2007–08	Ohio State	24–13	10–8	5th	NIT Champions
2008–09	Ohio State	22–11	10–8	T–4th	NCAA first round
2009–10	Ohio State	29–8	14–4	T–1st	NCAA Sweet Sixteen
2010–11	Ohio State	34–3	16–2	1st	NCAA Sweet Sixteen
2011–12	Ohio State	31–8	13–5	T–1st	NCAA Final Four
2012–13	Ohio State	29–8	13–5	T–2nd	NCAA Elite Eight
2013–14	Ohio State	25–10	10–8	5th	NCAA first round
2014–15	Ohio State	24–11	11–7	6th	NCAA second round
2015–16	Ohio State	21–14	11–7	7th	NIT second round
2016–17	Ohio State	17–15	7–11	T–10th	
Thad Matta:		337–123	150–78		
Total:		337–123 (.733)			
National champion Postseason invitational champion Conference regular season champion Conference regular season and conference tournament champion Division regular season champion Division regular season and conference tournament champion Conference tournament champion

=== Chris Holtmann era (2017–2024) ===
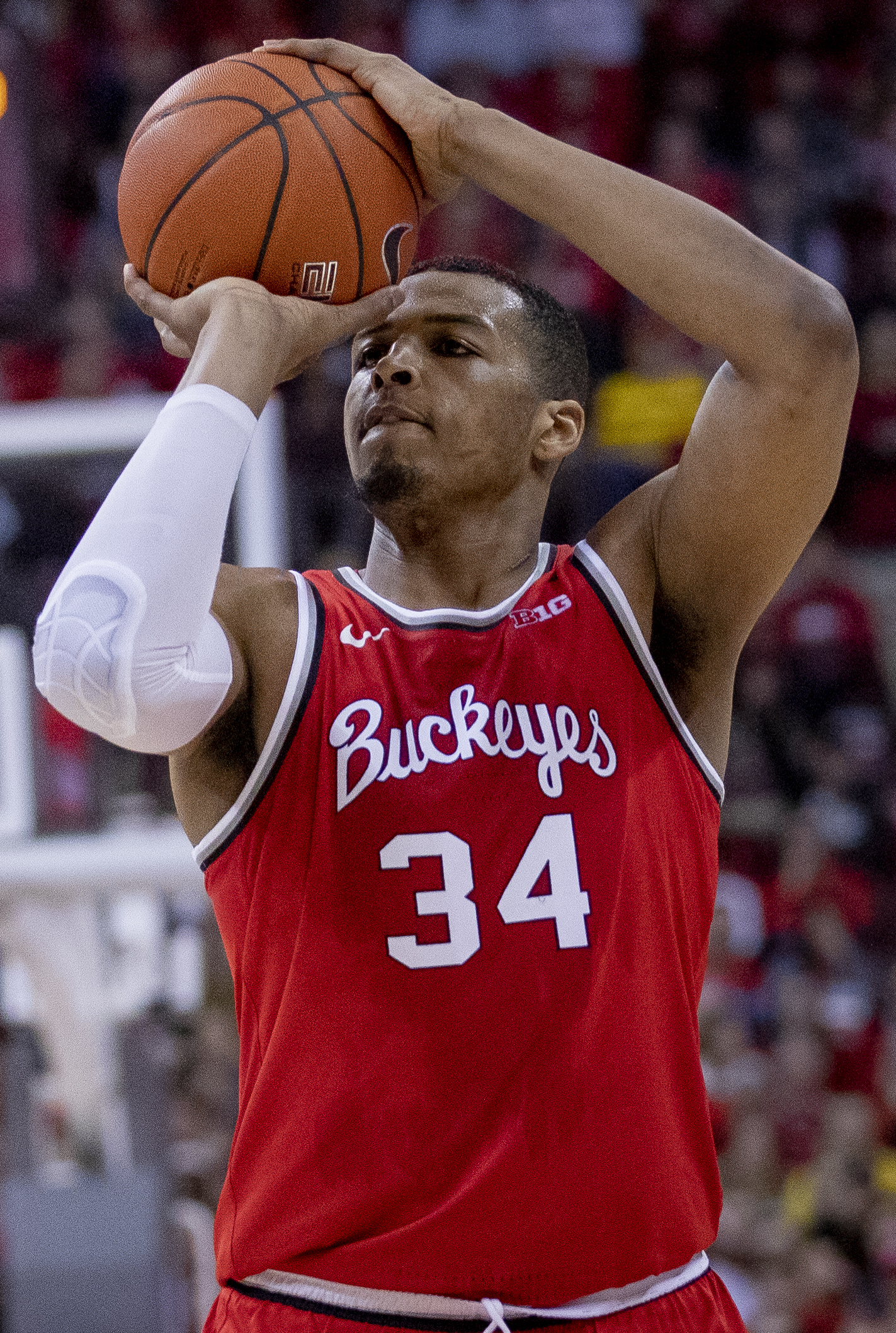
Kaleb Wesson, in March 2020.

On June 9, 2017, the school hired Butler head coach Chris Holtmann as head coach. The Buckeyes exceeded any and all expectations in Holtmann's first season in Columbus. Picked to finish no better than 11th in preseason media polls, the Buckeyes stormed out to a 9–0 record in Big Ten. Highlighting the 2017–18 season were home wins over Michigan, overcoming a first-half 20-point deficit, and No. 1 Michigan State along with a road victory at No. 3 Purdue, the Boilermakers’ only home loss of the season. Holtmann was named the 2018 Big Ten Coach of the Year after leading the Buckeyes to a 25–9 overall record, a second-place finish in the Big Ten regular-season standings (15–3). The Buckeyes were led by Big Ten Player of the Year, Keita Bates-Diop, and a four-year starter, Jae’Sean Tate; both of which are now in the NBA. The season ended on a somber note as the Buckeyes were eliminated in the second round of the 2018 NCAA tournament by Gonzaga.

In 2018–19, Holtmann's Buckeyes went 20–15, marking the sixth consecutive season a Holtmann team had won 20 or more games. As an 11-seed the Buckeyes knocked off 6-seed Iowa State to advance to the second round of the 2019 NCAA tournament, before being eliminated by Houston.

The 2019–20 season was cut short with the cancellation of the 2020 Big Ten and NCAA Tournaments. The Buckeyes posted an overall record of 21–10, which included four wins vs. Top 10 opponents (Villanova, at North Carolina, Kentucky and Maryland). Ohio State finished tied for fifth in the Big Ten at 11–9. Despite no postseason tournament, the Buckeyes managed 20 wins, marking the seventh consecutive season Holtmann-coach teams reached that plateau.

In a season shortened by COVID-19 implications, the 2020–21 Buckeyes went 21–10 record overall. Ohio State finished tied for fifth in the B1G (12–8) and reached the championship game of the 2021 Big Ten Tournament. The Buckeyes were led by 1st Team All-Big Ten forward EJ Liddell, and 3rd Team All-Big Ten guard Duane Washington Jr. Ohio State appeared in the AP Top 10 for the final seven weeks of the season and earned a #2 seed in the 2021 NCAA Tournament, only to lose to 15-seed Oral Roberts in the first round.

The 2021–22 Buckeyes posted a 20–12 record and 12–8 conference record. The team lost in the second round of the 2022 NCAA tournament to Villanova.

Holtmann is the second Ohio State coach to win 20 or more games in his first five seasons in Columbus, joining Thad Matta (12 from 2005 to 2016). However, he has not won a conference championship, and his teams have struggled in postseason play: through his first 11 seasons as a head coach, his teams had never won a conference tournament, and had advanced beyond the first weekend of the NCAA tournament only once, leading to some criticism from fans.

The criticism of Holtmann continued in the 2022–23 season, as after starting the season with 10 wins in 13 games, the Buckeyes went into an extended tailspin, losing 14 of 15 games. On February 12, the Buckeyes scored just 41 points in a home blowout loss to Michigan State, the program's lowest point total in 27 years.

Holtmann was fired on February 14, 2024, as the team continued to struggle in conference play as the team lost 9 out of his final 11 games. Assistant coach Jake Diebler was named interim head coach after his firing.

Record table
Season	Coach	Overall	Conference	Standing	Postseason
Chris Holtmann (Big Ten Conference) (2017–present)
2017–18	Ohio State	25–9	15–3	T–2nd	NCAA second round
2018–19	Ohio State	20–15	8–12	T–8th	NCAA second round
2019–20	Ohio State	21–10	11–9	T–5th	Cancelled (COVID Outbreak)
2020–21	Ohio State	21–10	12–8	5th	NCAA first round
2021–22	Ohio State	20–12	12–8	T–4th	NCAA second round
2022–23	Ohio State	16–19	5–15	13th	
2023–24	Ohio State	14–11	4–10		
Chris Holtmann:		137–86	67–65		
Total:		137–86 (.614)			
National champion Postseason invitational champion Conference regular season champion Conference regular season and conference tournament champion Division regular season champion Division regular season and conference tournament champion Conference tournament champion

== Facilities ==
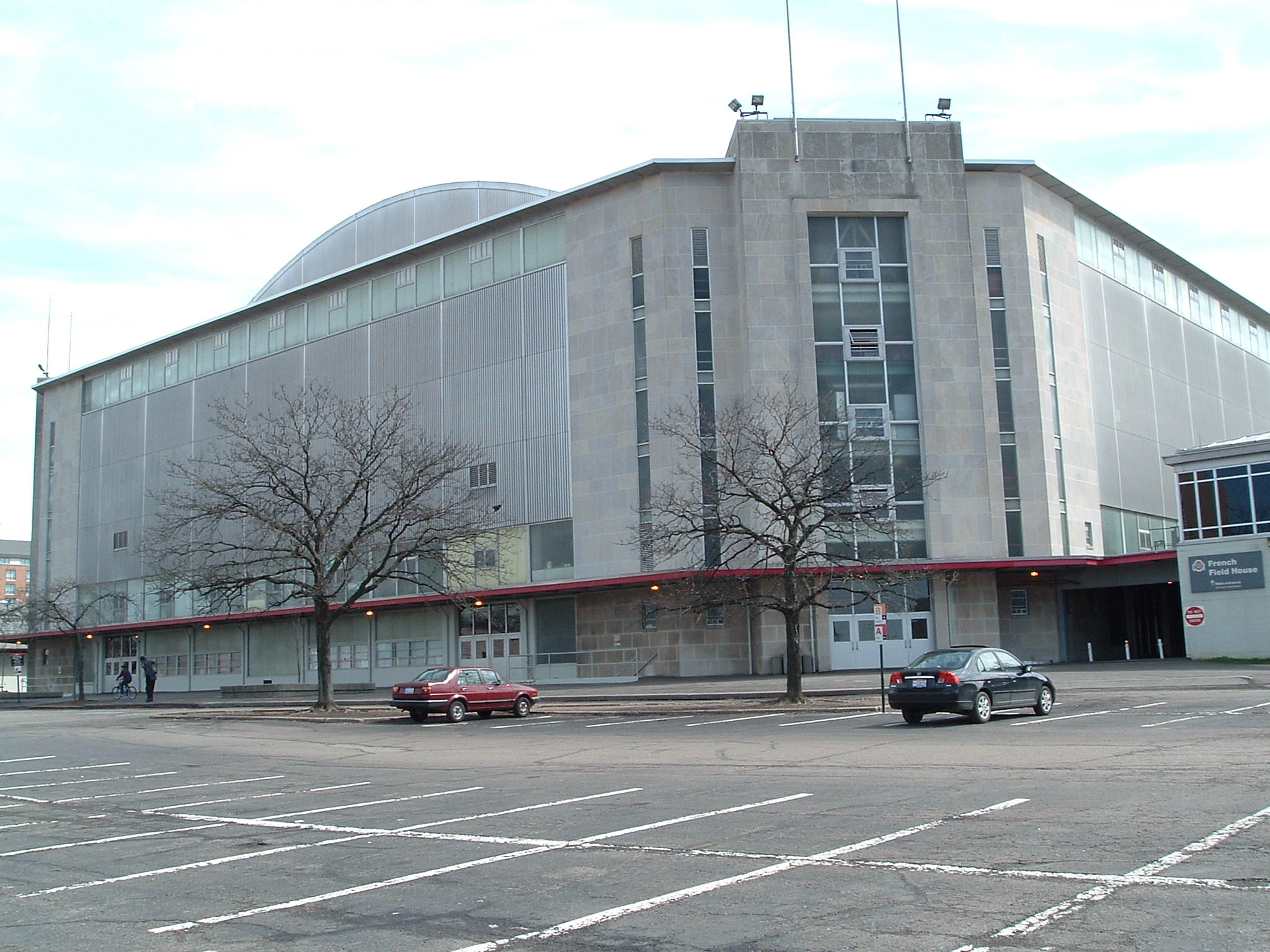
St. John Arena

The Ohio State Buckeyes presently play their home games in the 19,200-seat Value City Arena. The first official home court for the Buckeyes was the Ohio Expo Center Coliseum. Constructed in 1918, the Buckeyes called this arena home between the years 1920 to 1955. The facility had a capacity of 7,000 people.

In 1955, a new facility was built on the campus of Ohio State named the St. John Arena named after Lynn St. John, an Ohio State basketball coach and athletic director. This building, while hosting the men's basketball team, also hosted (and still to this day hosts) volleyball, gymnastics, and wrestling. The capacity of St. John Arena is 13,276. This building is the only Buckeye arena to serve as home for an Ohio State men's basketball championship team in 1960.

With the aging St. John Arena over 40 years old, Ohio State University decided to build Value City Arena to hold men's and women's basketball as well as hockey. The 770,000 sq foot arena was completed in 1998 and seats 19,500 for basketball games.

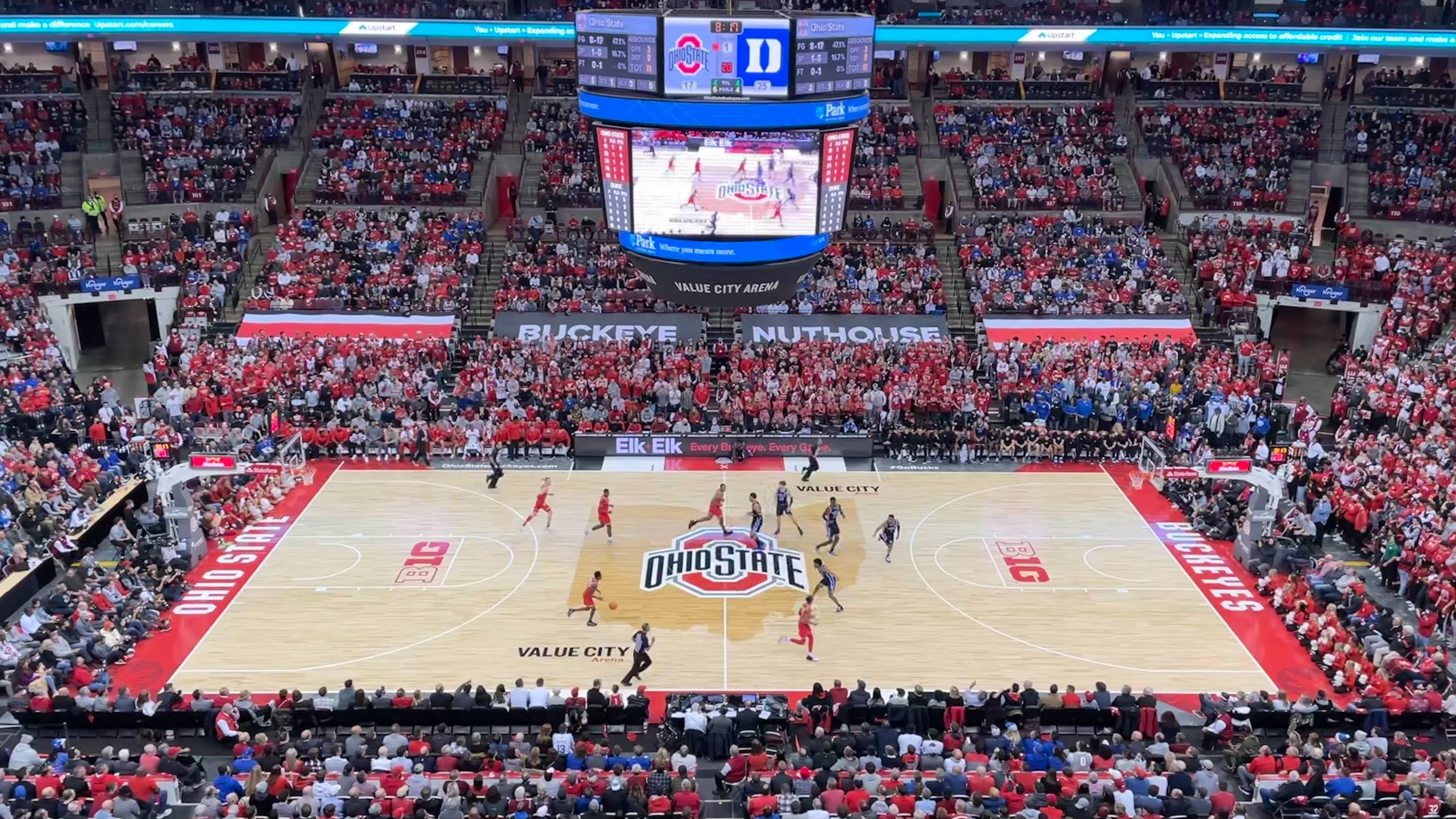
Duke v OSU Men's basketball at the Value City Arena of the Jerome Schottenstein Center

Ohio State University completed a $19 million renovation to the Schottenstein Center in 2013 that includes updated locker rooms for the Men's and Women's Basketball teams, a new training room with hydrotherapy pools, a new weight room, and a new practice gym to complement the existing gym. A $34 million renovation completed in 2018 improved the concourse as well as added new space for the coaches, team shop, ticket office, and building administration.

During the team's formative years the Buckeyes played their home games at the Ohio State University Armory. Built in 1897 at a cost of $115,000, the massive brick medieval style building was demolished in 1958 after damage caused by a fire. From 1897 to 1917 the Buckeyes used the building known as "Drill Hall" or "The Gymnasium" as their home court, only being asked to leave due to the outbreak of World War I. The team's overall record at the Armory was 178–104. In 1919, without a definite home, the team played some of their games at Indianola Park as well as the Coliseum and the Armory. Finally, in 1920, the team officially moved to the Ohio State Fairgrounds and played in their home games at the Ohio Expo Center Coliseum. During their time at the Coliseum, the Buckeyes played in five national title games.

== Coaches ==
The Buckeyes have had 14 coaches in their 110-year history. Thad Matta, who was hired in 2004, and led the Buckeyes to five NCAA Tournament appearances and two Final Four appearances during the 2006–07 and 2011–12 seasons. The only Ohio State coach to win a national championship was Fred Taylor in 1960.

Coach	Years	Overall record
Unknown	1898–1901	21–11
No team	1901–1902	–
D.C. Huddleson	1902–1904	15–6
Unknown	1904–1908	33–14
Tom Kibler	1908–1910	22–2
Sox Raymond	1910–1911	7–2
Lynn St. John	1911–1919	79–70
George Trautman	1919–1922	29–33
Harold Olsen	1922–1946	259–197
Tippy Dye	1946–1950	53–34
Floyd Stahl	1950–1958	84–92
Fred Taylor	1958–1976	297–158
Eldon Miller	1976–1986	174–120
Gary Williams	1986–1989	59–41
Randy Ayers	1989–1997	124–108
Jim O'Brien	1997–2004	133–88
Thad Matta	2004–2017	337–123
Chris Holtmann	2017–2024	137–86
Jake Diebler	2024–present	25–18
Head coaches		16

=== Current coaching staff ===
Name	Position
Jake Diebler	Head coach
Joel Justus	Associate head coach
Dave Dickerson	Assistant coach
Jamall Walker	Assistant coach
Luke Simons	Assistant coach
Quadrian Banks	Assistant Director of Strength & Conditioning
David Egelhoff	Director of Basketball Operations
Terence Dials	Director of Professional Development
Nicholas Kellogg	Special Assistant to Head Coach
Robbie Rucki	Video Coordinator
Tony Laurenzi	Athletic Trainer
Jared Sullinger	Director of Player Development

== Accomplishments ==
=== NCAA National Championships ===
Season	Coach	Opponent	Score	Site	Overall record	Big Ten Record
1959–60	Fred Taylor	California	75–55	San Francisco, CA	25–3	13–1
National Championships					1

1960 NCAA Tournament Results
Round	Opponent	Score
Semifinals	Western Kentucky	98–79
Regional Finals	Georgia Tech	86–69
Final Four	NYU	76–54
Championship	California	75–55

=== Final Four history ===
1939–Finalist	1944–Semifinalist	1945–Semifinalist	1946–Semifinalist
1960–Champion	1961–Finalist	1962–Finalist	1968–Semifinalist
1999–Semifinalist (vacated)	2007–Finalist	2012–Semifinalist

=== NCAA tournament seeding history ===
The NCAA began seeding the tournament with the 1979 edition.

Years →	'80	'82	'83	'85	'87	'90	'91	'92	'99	'00	'01	'02	'06	'07	'09	'10	'11	'12	'13	'14	'15	'18	'19	'21	'22	'26
Seeds →	4	8	3	4	9	8	1	1	4	3	5	4	2	1	8	2	1*	2	2	6	10	5	11	2	7	8

- The * represents overall number one seed which began with the 2004 Tournament.

=== NCAA tournament results ===
Ohio State has appeared in the NCAA Division I men's basketball tournament 36 times, with four of those appearances later being vacated. Their record on the court is 58–35* (52–31).

Year	Round	Opponent	Result
1939	Elite Eight; Final Four; National Championship Game	Wake Forest; Villanova; Oregon	W 64–52; W 53–36; L 33–46
1944	Elite Eight; Final Four	Temple; Dartmouth	W 57–47; L 53–60
1945	Elite Eight; Final Four	Kentucky; New York University	W 45–37; L 65–70
1946	Elite Eight; Final Four; Regional 3rd Place Game	Harvard; North Carolina; California	W 46–38; L 57–60; W 63–45
1950	Elite Eight; 3rd Place Game	City College of New York; Holy Cross	L 55–56; W 72–52
1960	Sweet Sixteen; Elite Eight; Final Four; National Championship Game	Western Kentucky; Georgia Tech; New York University; California	W 98–79; W 86–69; W 76–54; W 75–55
1961	Sweet Sixteen; Elite Eight; Final Four; National Championship Game	Louisville; Kentucky; Saint Joseph's; Cincinnati	W 56–55; W 87–44; W 95–69; L 65–70
1962	Sweet Sixteen; Elite Eight; Final Four; National Championship Game	Western Kentucky; Kentucky; Wake Forest; Cincinnati	W 93–73; W 74–64; W 84–68; L 59–71
1968	Sweet Sixteen; Elite Eight; Final Four; 3rd Place Game	East Tennessee State; Kentucky; North Carolina; Houston	W 79–72; W 82–81; L 66–80; W 89–85
1971	Sweet Sixteen; Elite Eight	Marquette; Western Kentucky	W 60–59; L 78–81
1980	Second Round; Sweet Sixteen	#5 Arizona State #8 UCLA	W 89–75; L 68–72
1982	First Round	#8 James Madison	L 48–55
1983	Second Round; Sweet Sixteen	#6 Syracuse #2 North Carolina	W 79–74; L 51–64
1985	First Round; Second Round	#13 Iowa State #5 Louisiana Tech	W 75–64; L 67–79
1987	First Round; Second Round	#8 Kentucky #1 Georgetown	W 91–77; L 79–82
1990	First Round; Second Round	#9 Providence #1 UNLV	W 84–83; L 65–76
1991	First Round; Second Round; Sweet Sixteen	#16 Towson #8 Georgia Tech #4 St. John's	W 97–86; W 65–61; L 74–91
1992	First Round; Second Round; Sweet Sixteen; Elite Eight	#16 Mississippi Valley State #9 Connecticut #4 North Carolina #6 Michigan	W 83–56; W 78–55; W 80–73; L 71–75
1999	First Round; Second Round; Sweet Sixteen; Elite Eight; Final Four	#13 Murray State #12 Detroit #1 Auburn #3 St. John's #1 Connecticut	W 72–58; W 75–44; W 72–64; W 77–74; L 58–64
2000	First Round; Second Round	#14 Appalachian St #6 Miami, FL	W 87–61; L 62–75
2001	First Round	#12 Utah State	L 68–77
2002	First Round; Second Round	#13 Davidson #12 Missouri	W 69–64; L 67–83
2006	First Round; Second Round	#15 Davidson #7 Georgetown	W 70–60; L 52–70
2007	First Round; Second Round; Sweet Sixteen; Elite Eight; Final Four; National Championship Game	#16 Central Connecticut State #9 Xavier #5 Tennessee #2 Memphis #2 Georgetown #1 Florida	W 78–57; W 78–71; W 85–84; W 92–76; W 67–60; L 75–84
2009	First Round	#9 Siena	L 72–74
2010	First Round; Second Round; Sweet Sixteen	#15 UC Santa Barbara #10 Georgia Tech #6 Tennessee	W 68–51; W 75–66; L 73–76
2011	Second Round; Third Round; Sweet Sixteen	#16 Texas–San Antonio #8 George Mason #4 Kentucky	W 75–46; W 98–66; L 60–62
2012	Second Round; Third Round; Sweet Sixteen; Elite Eight; Final Four	#15 Loyola (MD) #7 Gonzaga #6 Cincinnati #1 Syracuse #2 Kansas	W 78–59; W 73–66; W 81–76; W 77–70; L 62–64
2013	Second Round; Third Round; Sweet Sixteen; Elite Eight	#15 Iona #10 Iowa State #6 Arizona #9 Wichita State	W 95–70; W 78–75; W 73–70; L 66–70
2014	Second Round	#11 Dayton	L 59–60
2015	Second Round; Third Round	#7 VCU #2 Arizona	W 75–72^{OT} L 58–73
2018	First Round; Second Round	#12 South Dakota State #4 Gonzaga	W 81–73; L 84–90
2019	First Round; Second Round	#6 Iowa State #3 Houston	W 62–59; L 59–74
2021	First Round	#15 Oral Roberts	L 72–75^{OT}
2022	First Round; Second Round	#10 Loyola-Chicago #2 Villanova	W 54–41; L 61–71
2026	First Round	#9 TCU	L 64–66

=== NIT results ===
The Buckeyes are two time NIT champions (1986, 2008).

Year	Round	Opponent	Result
1979	First Round; Second Round; Semifinals; 3rd Place Game	St. Joseph's; Maryland; Indiana; Alabama	W 80–66; W 79–72; L 55–64; L 86–96
1984	First Round	Xavier	L 57–60
1986	First Round; Second Round; Quarterfinals; Semifinals; Final	Ohio; Texas; BYU; Louisiana Tech; Wyoming	W 65–62; W 71–65; W 79–68; W 79–66; W 73–63
1988	First Round; Second Round; Quarterfinals; Semifinals; Final	Old Dominion; Cleveland State; New Mexico; Colorado State; Connecticut	W 86–73; W 86–80; W 68–65; W 64–62; L 67–72
1989	First Round; Second Round; Quarterfinals	Akron; Nebraska; St. John's	W 81–70; W 85–74; L 80–83
1993	First Round	Miami (OH)	L 53–56
2003	First Round	Georgia Tech	L 58–72
2008	First Round; Second Round; Quarterfinals; Semifinals; Final	UNC–Asheville; California; Dayton; Ole Miss; Massachusetts	W 84–66; W 73–56; W 74–63; W 81–69; W 92–85
2016	First Round; Second Round	Akron; Florida	W 72–63; L 66–74
2024	First Round; Second Round; Quarterfinal	Cornell; Virginia Tech; Georgia	W 88–83; W 81–73; L 79–77

=== Big Ten tournament championships ===
Ohio State has won 4 Big Ten tournament championships since its inception during the 1997–98 season. Ohio State won their first title in 2002 under Jim O'Brien (later vacated), while winning 4 under head coach Thad Matta. Under Matta, the Buckeyes appeared in the Big Ten tournament championship five consecutive seasons from 2009 to 2013.

Season	Coach	Opponent	Score	Site	Overall record	Big Ten record
2006–07	Thad Matta	Wisconsin	66–49	Chicago, IL	35–4	15–1
2009–10	Thad Matta	Minnesota	90–61	Indianapolis, IN	29–8	14–4
2010–11	Thad Matta	Penn State	71–60	Indianapolis, IN	34–3	16–2
2012–13	Thad Matta	Wisconsin	50–43	Chicago, IL	26–7	13–5
Big Ten tournament championships						4

=== Big Ten regular season championships ===
Season	Coach	Overall record	Big Ten record
1924–25	Harold Olsen	14–2	11–1
1932–33	Harold Olsen	17–3	10–2
1938–39	Harold Olsen	16–7	9–2
1943–44	Harold Olsen	15–6	10–2
1945–46	Harold Olsen	16–5	10–2
1949–50	Tippy Dye	22–4	12–1
1959–60	Fred Taylor	25–3	13–1
1960–61	Fred Taylor	27–1	14–0
1961–62	Fred Taylor	26–2	13–1
1962–63	Fred Taylor	20–4	11–3
1963–64	Fred Taylor	16–8	11–3
1967–68	Fred Taylor	21–8	10–4
1970–71	Fred Taylor	20–6	13–1
1990–91	Randy Ayers	27–4	15–3
1991–92	Randy Ayers	26–6	15–3
2005–06	Thad Matta	26–6	12–4
2006–07	Thad Matta	35–4	15–1
2009–10	Thad Matta	29–8	14–4
2010–11	Thad Matta	34–3	16–2
2011–12	Thad Matta	31–8	13–5
Big Ten regular season championships			20

== Record vs. Big Ten opponents ==
The Ohio State Buckeyes lead the all-time series vs. seven Big Ten opponents. Two of the all-time series are within three games. These records do not include vacated games (e.g. Purdue does count all their games played against Ohio State and tie the series 94–94 according to their records. Iowa counts all games played against OSU and lead the series 85–84 according to their records).

Opponent	Wins	Losses	Pct.	Streak
Illinois	76	109	.417	ILL 3
Indiana	84	112	.439	IU 5
Iowa	80	83	.490	Iowa 1
Michigan	108	87	.573	Mich 4
Michigan State	62	79	.434	MSU 2
Minnesota	91	63	.595	Minn 2
Nebraska	21	8	.826	OSU 1
Northwestern	122	51	.716	NW 3
Penn State	41	20	.679	OSU 1
Purdue	88	94	.48	OSU 2
Wisconsin	91	78	.549	WIS 3
Maryland	11	12	.471	OSU 1
Rutgers	15	5	.769	OSU 3
Oregon	2	2	.500	Oregon 1
Washington	4	3	.550	OSU 2
UCLA	4	7	.400	UCLA 2
USC	4	3	.555	OSU 2

== Awards ==
=== Consensus All-American selections ===
- Wes Fesler (1931)
- Jimmy Hull (1939)
- Dick Schnittker (1950)
- Robin Freeman (1955)
- Jerry Lucas (1960, 1961*, 1962*)
- Gary Bradds (1964*)
- Jim Jackson (1991, 1992)
- Evan Turner (2010*)
- Jared Sullinger (2011, 2012)
- D'Angelo Russell (2015)
- Dennis Hopson (1987)

*National Player of the Year

=== Big Ten Player of the Year ===
- Dennis Hopson (1987)
- Jim Jackson (1991, 1992)
- Scoonie Penn (1999)
- Terence Dials (2006)
- Evan Turner (2010)
- Keita Bates-Diop (2018)

=== Big Ten Coach of the Year ===
- Eldon Miller (1983)
- Randy Ayers (1991, 1992)
- Jim O’Brien (1999, 2001)
- Thad Matta (2006, 2010)
- Chris Holtmann (2018)

=== First-Team All-Big Ten ===
Harold "Cookie" Cunningham (1925)	Johnny Miner (1925)	Adam Bales (1926)	Bill Hunt (1927)	Wes Fesler (1931)
Bill Hosket Sr. (1933)	Tippy Dye (1936, 1937)	Bob Lynch (1939)	Jimmy Hull (1939)
Dick Fisher (1941)	Arnold "Smokes" Risen (1944)	Don Grate (1944, 1945)	Jack Underman (1946)	Paul Huston (1946)
Dick Schnittker (1949, 1950)	Bob Donham (1950)	Paul Ebert (1952, 1953, 1954)	Robin Freeman (1955, 1956)	Frank Howard (1957, 1958)
Jerry Lucas (1960, 1961, 1962)	Larry Siegfried (1961)	John Havlicek (1961, 1962)	Gary Bradds (1963, 1964)	Bill Hosket Jr. (1967, 1968)
Dave Sorenson (1969, 1970)	Jim Cleamons (1971)	Luke Witte (1971)	Allan Hornyak (1971, 1972, 1973)	Kelvin Ransey (1978, 1979, 1980)
Herb Williams (1980)	Clark Kellogg (1982)	Tony Campbell (1983, 1984)	Brad Sellers (1986)	Dennis Hopson (1987)
Jay Burson (1989)	Jim Jackson (1991, 1992)	Scoonie Penn (1999, 2000)	Michael Redd (2000)	Ken Johnson (2001)
Terence Dials (2006)	Mike Conley Jr. (2007)	Greg Oden (2007)	Evan Turner (2009, 2010)
Jared Sullinger (2011, 2012)	Deshaun Thomas (2013)	D'Angelo Russell (2015)	Keita Bates-Diop (2018)	E.J. Liddell (2021, 2022)

All award data taken from

== Notable players ==
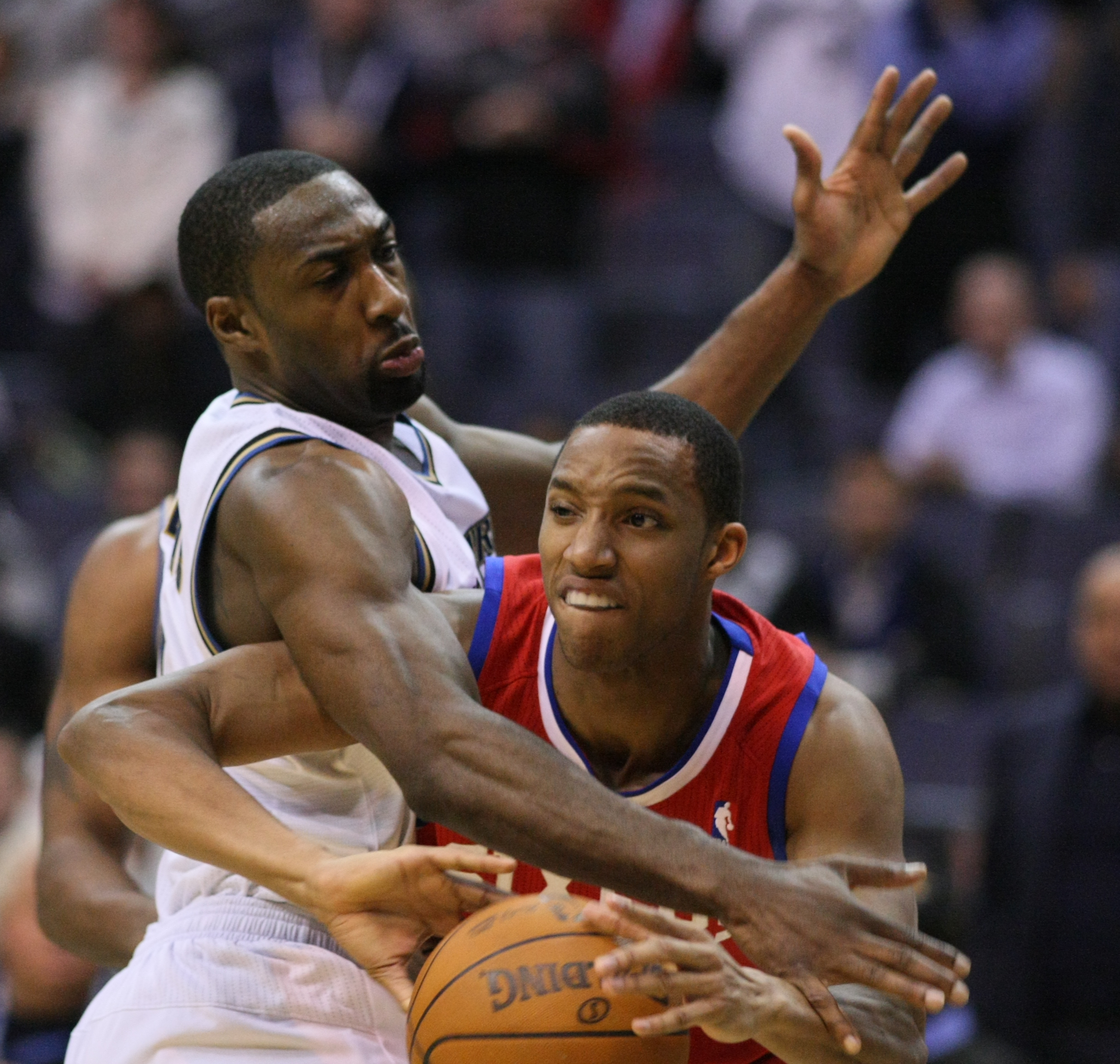
Evan Turner, Ohio State Buckeyes forward and 2010 National Player of the Year

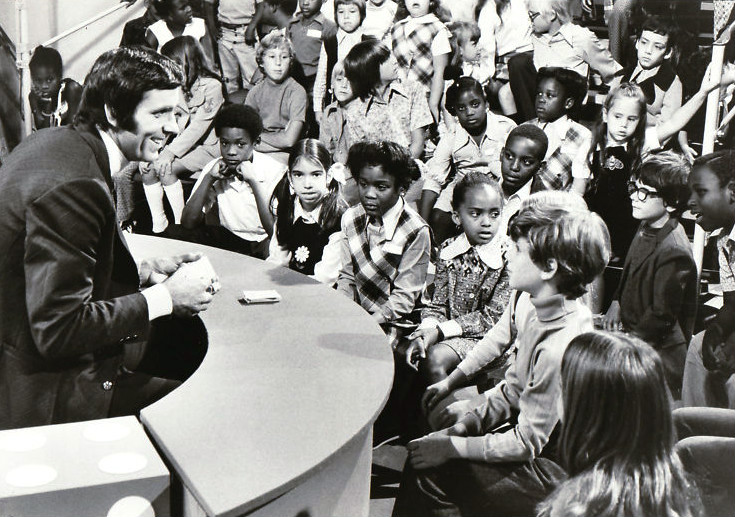
Jerry Lucas, Ohio State Buckeyes center and 2-time National Player of the Year (1961–62)

Name	Position	Seasons	Notes
Gary Bradds	F	1961–64	1964 AP Player of the Year; 1964 UPI College Player of the Year; 1964 Adolph Rupp Trophy Winner; 1962-63 Consensus Second Team All-American; 1963-64 Consensus First Team All-American; 2x Chicago Tribune Silver Basketball (Big Ten MVP) (1963–64); ABA Champion (1969); 1963 Pan American Games Men's Basketball Gold Medalist
Wes Fesler	G	1928–31	1930-31 Consensus First Team All-American
Robin Freeman	G	1953-56	1954-55 Consensus Second Team All-American; 1955-56 Consensus First Team All-American; 1956 Chicago Tribune Silver Basketball
Jimmy Hull	F	1938–39	1938-39 Consensus First Team All-American; 1939 NCAA Final Four Most Outstanding Player
Jim Jackson	G	1989–92	1992 UPI College Player of the Year; 2× Big Ten Conference Player of the Year (1991–1992); 2× Consensus First Team All-American (1991–1992); 1991 Pan American Games Men's Basketball Bronze Medalist
Jerry Lucas	C	1959–62	2× AP Player of the Year (1961–1962); 2× NCAA Final Four Most Outstanding Player (1960–1961); 3× Consensus NCAA All-American First Team (1960–1962); NCAA Champion (1960); NBA's 50th Anniversary All-Time Team; NBA Champion (1973); 7× NBA All-Star (1964–1969, 1971); NBA All-Star Game MVP (1965); 3× All-NBA First Team (1965–1966, 1968); 2× All-NBA Second Team (1964, 1967); NBA Rookie of the Year (1964); NBA All-Rookie First Team (1964)
John Havlicek	F	1959-62	Consensus NCAA All-America Second Team (1962); AP Third-Team All-American (1962); NCAA Champion (1960); 8x NBA Champion (1963–1966, 1968, 1969, 1974, 1976); NBA Finals MVP (1974); 13x NBA All-Star (1966–1978); 4x All-NBA First Team (1971–1974); 7× All-NBA Second Team (1964, 1966, 1968–1970, 1975, 1976)
Dick Schnittker	F	1948–50	1950 Consensus First Team All-American; 2x NBA Champion (1953, 1954)
Evan Turner	F	2007–10	Consensus First Team All-American (2010); 2010 National Player of the Year (AP, NABC, Naismith, Robertson, Wooden); Big Ten Conference Player of the Year (2010); Big Ten tournament MVP (2010)

=== Retired numbers ===
Ohio State has retired five jersey numbers.

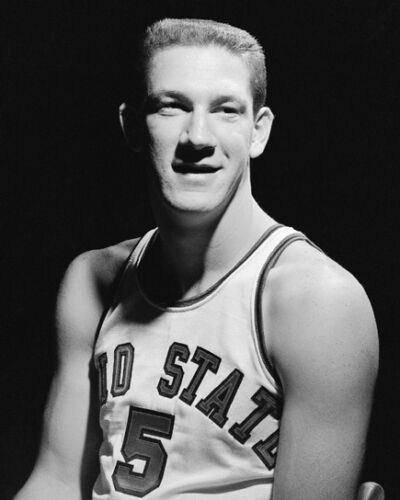
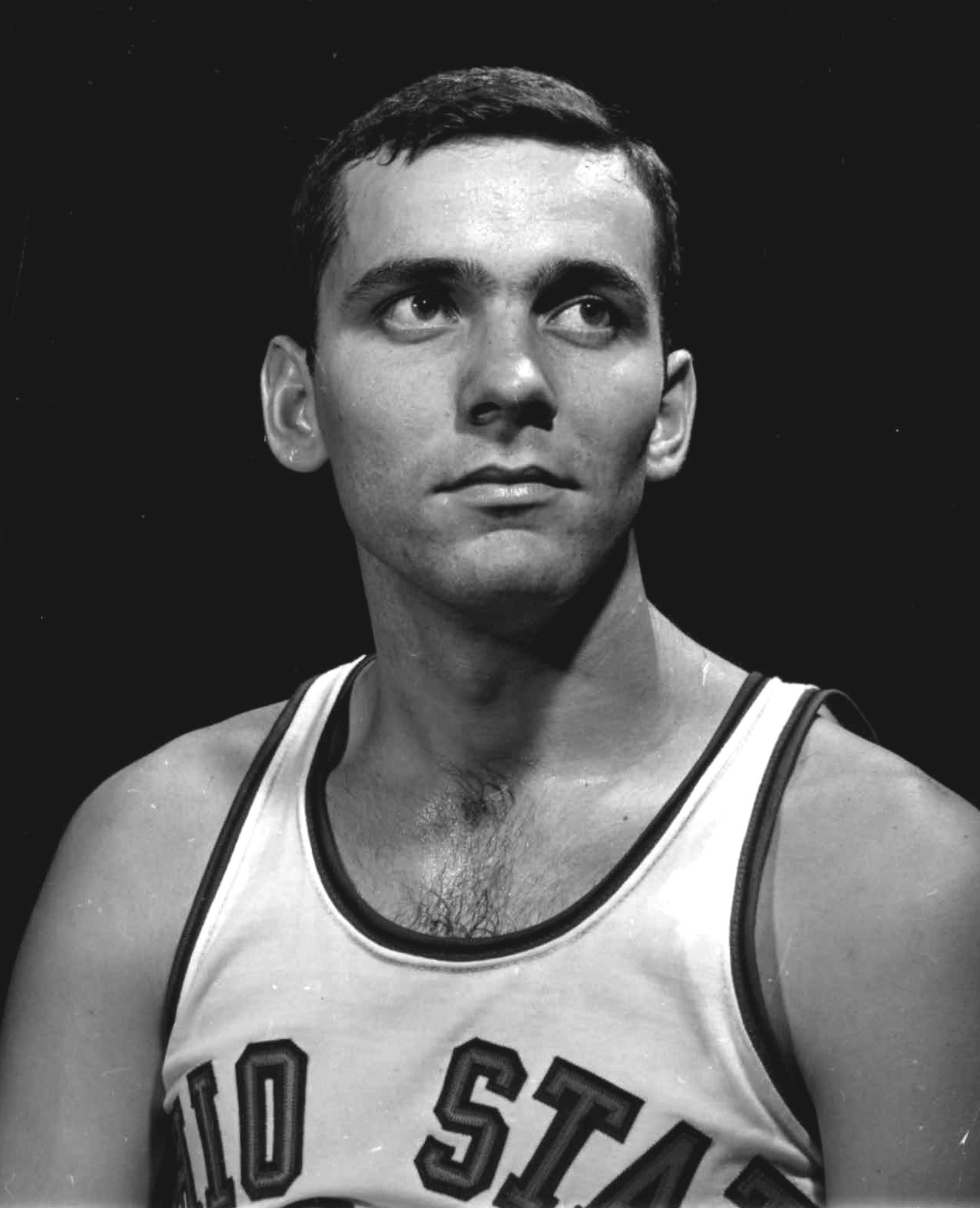
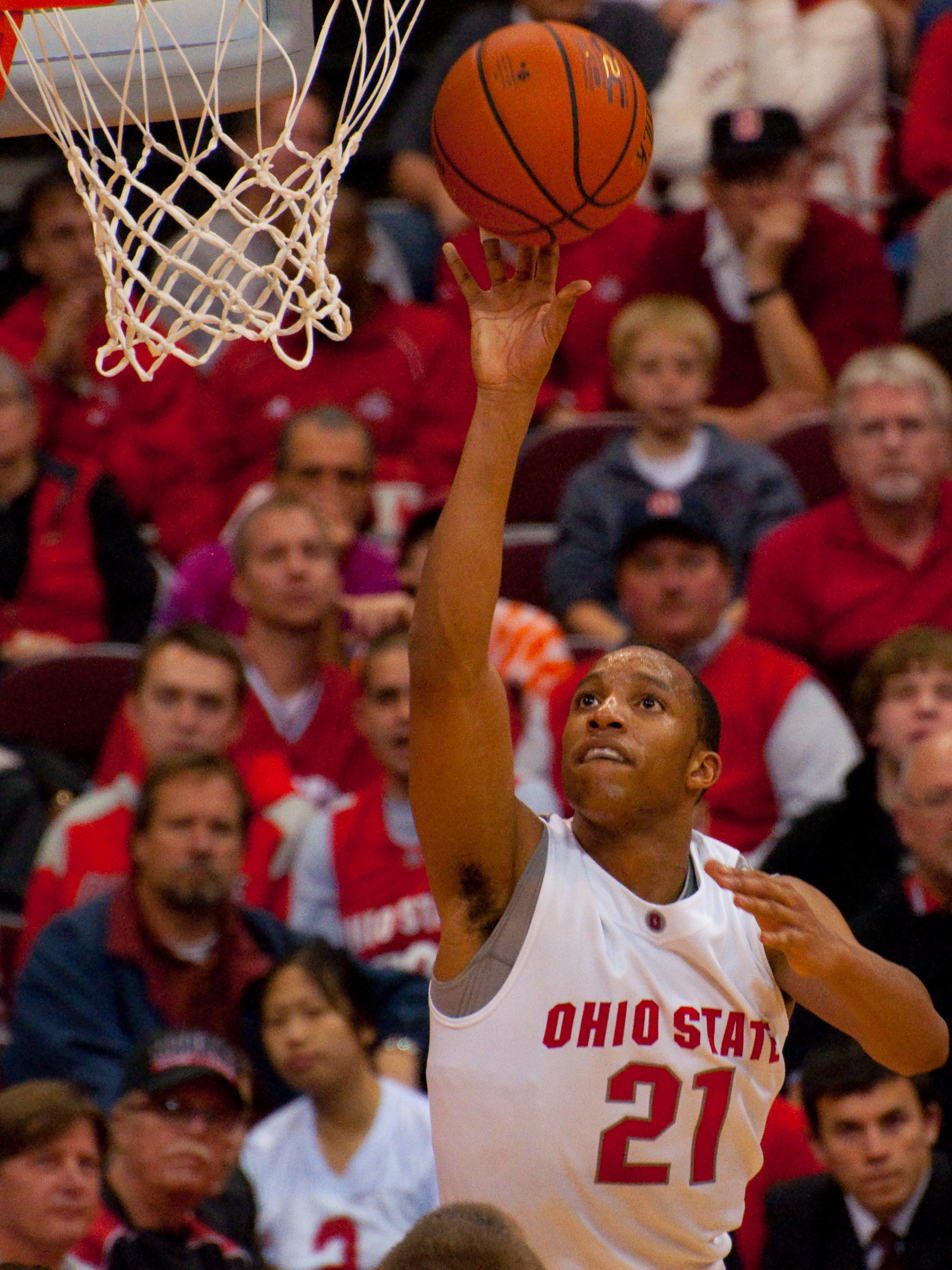
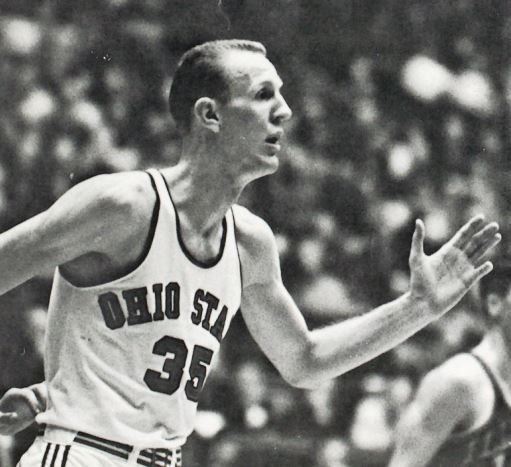
Fltr: John Havlicek, Jerry Lucas, Evan Turner, and Gary Bradds, whose numbers were retired by Ohio State

Ohio State Buckeyes retired numbers
No.	Player	Position	Career	Ref.
5	John Havlicek	F	1959–62	
11	Jerry Lucas	C	1959–62	
21	Evan Turner	G/F	2007–10	
22	Jim Jackson	G	1989–92	
35	Gary Bradds	C	1961–64	

=== Honored coaches ===
Two longtime head coaches have been honored with banners which hang alongside the retired numbers:

Honored Coaches
Coach	Years	Record	Conf. Titles	Tourney Apps.	Final Four Apps.	National Titles
Fred Taylor	1959–1976	297–158 (.653)	7	5	4	1
Thad Matta	2004–2017	337–123 (.733)	5	9	2	0
