= 1898–99 Penn State Nittany Lions basketball team =

American college basketball season

1898–99 Penn State Nittany Lions basketball
- Conference: Independent
- Record: 2–3
- Head coach: student coaches
- Captain: M.R. Stevenson
- Home arena: Armory

The 1898–1899 Penn State Nittany Lions basketball team represented Penn State University during the 1898–99 college men's basketball season. The team finished with a final record of 2–3.

== Schedule ==
Date time, TV	Opponent	Result	Record	Site city, state
1/13/1899*	Clover Wheel	W 12–10	1–0	Armory; University Park, PA
1/28/1899*	Bucknell	W 17–6	2–0	Armory; University Park, PA
3/01/1899*	at Bloomsburg	L 6–30	2–1	Bloomsburg, PA
3/02/1899*	at Williamsport YMCA	L 13–17	2–2	Williamsport, PA
3/03/1899*	at Bucknell	L 8–12	2–3	Lewisburg, PA
*Non-conference game. (#) Tournament seedings in parentheses.
