= 1898–99 Kansas Jayhawks men's basketball team =

American college basketball season

1898–99 Kansas Jayhawks men's basketball
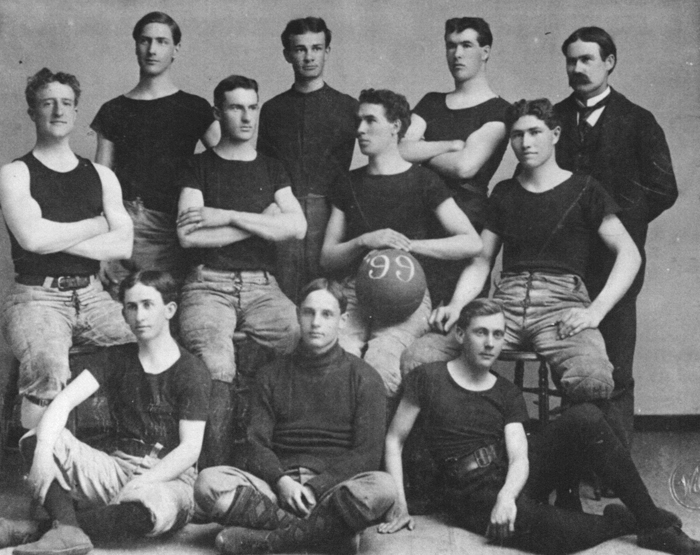
- The 1899 University of Kansas basketball team, with Dr. James Naismith at the back, right.
- Conference: Independent
- Record: 7–4
- Head coach: James Naismith (1st season)
- Captain: William Sutton
- Home arena: Snow Hall

1898–99 collegiate men's basketball independents standings
| | Conf. | | | | Overall |
| Team | W | | L | PCT | W | | L | PCT |
|---|---|---|---|---|---|---|---|---|
| Bloomsburg | | – | | – | 10 | – | 0 | 1.000 |
| Illinois State | | – | | – | 2 | – | 0 | 1.000 |
| Nebraska | | – | | – | 4 | – | 0 | 1.000 |
| Notre Dame | | – | | – | 2 | – | 0 | 1.000 |
| Syracuse | | – | | – | 1 | – | 0 | 1.000 |
| Wabash | | – | | – | 2 | – | 0 | 1.000 |
| Widener | | – | | – | 1 | – | 0 | 1.000 |
| West Chester | | – | | – | 11 | – | 1 | .917 |
| Allegheny | | – | | – | 8 | – | 1 | .889 |
| Yale | | – | | – | 9 | – | 2 | .818 |
| Hiram | | – | | – | 4 | – | 1 | .800 |
| Ohio State | | – | | – | 12 | – | 4 | .750 |
| Temple | | – | | – | 18 | – | 6 | .750 |
| Wisconsin–Stevens Point | | – | | – | 6 | – | 2 | .750 |
| Macalester | | – | | – | 7 | – | 3 | .700 |
| Kansas | | – | | – | 7 | – | 4 | .636 |
| North Dakota State | | – | | – | 2 | – | 2 | .500 |
| Washington | | – | | – | 1 | – | 1 | .500 |
| Mount Union | | – | | – | 2 | – | 3 | .400 |
| Penn State | | – | | – | 2 | – | 3 | .400 |
| Bucknell | | – | | – | 3 | – | 5 | .375 |
| Geneva | | – | | – | 3 | – | 6 | .333 |
| Westminster College | | – | | – | 2 | – | 4 | .333 |
| Cornell | | – | | – | 1 | – | 3 | .250 |
| Butler | | – | | – | 0 | – | 2 | .000 |
| Grove City | | – | | – | 0 | – | 2 | .000 |
| Michigan State | | – | | – | 0 | – | 2 | .000 |

The 1898–99 Kansas Jayhawks men's basketball team represented the University of Kansas in its first season of collegiate basketball. The head coach was James Naismith, the inventor of the game, who served his 1st year. The Jayhawks, who were not a member of a conference, finished the season 7–4.

== Roster ==
- Herbert Avery
- Patrick E. Ducey
- Willis Henderson
- William Hess
- Harold Hoyt
- Frederick Owens
- Claude Royal
- Rusel Russell
- Walter Sutton
- William Sutton
- William Yahn

== Schedule ==
| Date time, TV | Opponent | Result | Record | Site city, state |
|---|---|---|---|---|
| Feb. 3, 1899* | at Kansas City YMCA | L 5–16 | 0–1 | Kansas City, Missouri |
| Feb. 10, 1899* | Topeka YMCA | W 31–6 | 1–1 | Lawrence, Kansas |
| Feb. 18, 1899* | Lawrence YMCA | W 14–4 | 2–1 | Lawrence, Kansas |
| Feb. 25, 1899* | Kansas City YMCA | W 17–14 | 3–1 | Lawrence, Kansas |
| Mar. 3, 1899* | at Topeka YMCA | W 27–17 | 4–1 | Topeka, Kansas |
| Mar. 8, 1899* | at Topeka YMCA | W 23–12 | 5–1 | Topeka, Kansas |
| Mar. 23, 1899* | Haskell | W 29–8 | 6–1 | Lawrence, Kansas |
| Mar. 27, 1899* | at Kansas City Athletic Club | L 5–19 | 6–2 | Kansas City, Missouri |
| Mar. 30, 1899* | at Independence | L 15–21 | 6–3 | Independence, Missouri |
| Mar. 31, 1899* | at Independence | L 10–22 | 6–4 | Independence, Missouri |
| Apr. 3, 1899* | at William Jewell | W 19–3 | 7–4 | Liberty, Missouri |
*Non-conference game. ^{#}Rankings from AP Poll. (#) Tournament seedings in parentheses. All times are in Central Standard Time.
