= 1898–99 Cornell Big Red men's basketball team =

American college basketball season

1898–99 Cornell Big Red men's basketball
- Conference: Independent
- Record: 1–3
- Head coach: none
- Home arena: none

1898–99 collegiate men's basketball independents standings
	Conf.				Overall
Team	W		L	PCT	W		L	PCT
Bloomsburg		–		–	10	–	0	1.000
Illinois State		–		–	2	–	0	1.000
Nebraska		–		–	4	–	0	1.000
Notre Dame		–		–	2	–	0	1.000
Syracuse		–		–	1	–	0	1.000
Wabash		–		–	2	–	0	1.000
Widener		–		–	1	–	0	1.000
West Chester		–		–	11	–	1	.917
Allegheny		–		–	8	–	1	.889
Yale		–		–	9	–	2	.818
Hiram		–		–	4	–	1	.800
Ohio State		–		–	12	–	4	.750
Temple		–		–	18	–	6	.750
Wisconsin–Stevens Point		–		–	6	–	2	.750
Macalester		–		–	7	–	3	.700
Kansas		–		–	7	–	4	.636
North Dakota State		–		–	2	–	2	.500
Washington		–		–	1	–	1	.500
Mount Union		–		–	2	–	3	.400
Penn State		–		–	2	–	3	.400
Bucknell		–		–	3	–	5	.375
Geneva		–		–	3	–	6	.333
Westminster College		–		–	2	–	4	.333
Cornell		–		–	1	–	3	.250
Butler		–		–	0	–	2	.000
Grove City		–		–	0	–	2	.000
Michigan State		–		–	0	–	2	.000

The 1898–99 Cornell Big Red men's basketball team represented Cornell University during the 1898–99 college men's basketball season. The team finished with a final record of 1–3.

== Schedule ==
Date time, TV	Opponent	Result	Record	Site city, state
12/13/1898*	at Waverly YMCA	W 48–12	1–0	
12/17/1898*	at Cortland YMCA	L 7–14	1–1	
12/24/1898*	at Yonkers YMCA	L 0–12	1–2	
12/25/1898*	vs. Yale	L 7–49	1–3	Poughkeepsie, NY
*Non-conference game. (#) Tournament seedings in parentheses.
