= 1898–99 Wisconsin Badgers men's basketball team =

American college basketball season

1898–99 Wisconsin Badgers men's basketball
- Conference: Big Ten Conference
- Record: 0–3 (0–0 Western)
- Head coach: James C. Elsom
- Home arena: Red Gym

1898–99 Western Conference men's basketball standings
	Conf.				Overall
Team	W		L	PCT	W		L	PCT
Minnesota†		–		–	5	–	4	.556
Wisconsin		–		–	0	–	3	.000
† Intramural play only, the conference did not have an official championship winner

The 1898–99 Wisconsin Badgers men's basketball team represented University of Wisconsin–Madison. Wisconsin Badger basketball began in December 1898 with the formation of its first team coached by Dr. James C. Elsom. The team played their home games at the Red Gym in Madison, Wisconsin and was a member of the Western Conference.

== Schedule ==
Date time, TV	Opponent	Result	Record	Site city, state
Jan 21*	at Milwaukee Normals Alumni	L 15–25	0–1	Milwaukee, WI
Feb 18*	at Lawrence (WI)	L 18–20	0–2	Appleton, WI
Mar 4*	at Milwaukee Normals Alumni	L 10–13	0–3	Milwaukee, WI
*Non-conference game. (#) Tournament seedings in parentheses.
