= 1898–99 Ohio State Buckeyes men's basketball team =

American college basketball season

1898–99 Ohio State Buckeyes men's basketball
- Conference: Independent
- Record: 12-4
- Head coach: Unknown

1898–99 collegiate men's basketball independents standings
	Conf.				Overall
Team	W		L	PCT	W		L	PCT
Bloomsburg		–		–	10	–	0	1.000
Illinois State		–		–	2	–	0	1.000
Nebraska		–		–	4	–	0	1.000
Notre Dame		–		–	2	–	0	1.000
Syracuse		–		–	1	–	0	1.000
Wabash		–		–	2	–	0	1.000
Widener		–		–	1	–	0	1.000
West Chester		–		–	11	–	1	.917
Allegheny		–		–	8	–	1	.889
Yale		–		–	9	–	2	.818
Hiram		–		–	4	–	1	.800
Ohio State		–		–	12	–	4	.750
Temple		–		–	18	–	6	.750
Wisconsin–Stevens Point		–		–	6	–	2	.750
Macalester		–		–	7	–	3	.700
Kansas		–		–	7	–	4	.636
North Dakota State		–		–	2	–	2	.500
Washington		–		–	1	–	1	.500
Mount Union		–		–	2	–	3	.400
Penn State		–		–	2	–	3	.400
Bucknell		–		–	3	–	5	.375
Geneva		–		–	3	–	6	.333
Westminster College		–		–	2	–	4	.333
Cornell		–		–	1	–	3	.250
Butler		–		–	0	–	2	.000
Grove City		–		–	0	–	2	.000
Michigan State		–		–	0	–	2	.000

The 1898–99 Ohio State Buckeyes men's basketball team represented the Ohio State University in its first season of college basketball. They finished with a 12-4 record.

== Schedule ==
Date time, TV	Rank^{#}	Opponent^{#}	Result	Record	Site city, state
December 2, 1898*		East High	W 25-4	1-0	The Armory; Columbus, Ohio
December 9, 1898*		East High	W 16-0	2-0	The Armory; Columbus, Ohio
December 10, 1898*		East High	W 34-8	3-0	The Armory; Columbus, Ohio
December 15, 1898*		at Piqua	L 7-9	3-1	Piqua, Ohio
December 29, 1898*		at Urbana	L 8-12	3-2	Urbana, Ohio
January 7, 1899*		Otterbein	W 25-2	4-2	The Armory; Columbus, Ohio
January 14, 1899*		Kenyon	W 18-2	5-2	The Armory; Columbus, Ohio
January 21, 1899*		Urbana	L 6-10	5-3	The Armory; Columbus, Ohio
January 28, 1899*		Kenton	W 17-8	6-3	The Armory; Columbus, Ohio
February 4, 1899*		Springfield YMCA	W 16-4	7-3	The Armory; Columbus, Ohio
February 9, 1899*		at Kenton	W 10-8	8-3	Kenton, Ohio
February 22, 1899*		at Kenyon	W 14-11	9-3	Gambier, Ohio
February 28, 1899*		Trinity	W 47-0	10-3	The Armory; Columbus, Ohio
March 3, 1899*		at Kenton	W 11-6	11-3	Kenton, Ohio
March 10, 1899*		at Circleville	W 21-1	12-3	Circleville, Ohio
April 3, 1899*		vs. Urbana	L 7-11	12-4	Kenton, Ohio
*Non-conference game. ^{#}Rankings from AP Poll. (#) Tournament seedings in parentheses.
