= Tom Kibler =

American baseball player, Minor League Baseball executive, among other occupations

Biographical details
- Born: July 17, 1886; Chestertown, Maryland, U.S.
- Died: October 18, 1971 (aged 85); Baltimore, Maryland, U.S.

Playing career

Baseball
- 1910–1912: Chillicothe Infants
- 1913–1914: San Antonio Bronchos
- 1914: Beaumont Oilers
- 1916: Newark Indians
- Position: Shortstop

Coaching career (HC unless noted)

Football
- 1916–1925: Washington College
- 1928–1932: Washington College

Basketball
- 1908–1910: Ohio State
- 1913–1917: Washington College
- 1919–1939: Washington College

Baseball
- 1914–1942: Washington College
- 1946–1947: Washington College
- 1952–1959: Washington College

Administrative career (AD unless noted)
- 1937–1949: Eastern Shore League (president)

Head coaching record
- Overall: 300–110 (basketball); 299–182–12 (baseball)

John Thomas Kibler (July 17, 1886 – October 18, 1971) was an American baseball player, coach of basketball and baseball, college athletics administrator and Minor League Baseball executive. He was a coach at Washington College, in various capacities, for over half a century. His duties included coaching the baseball, basketball and football teams.

Prior to joining the Washington College staff, Kibler had been a baseball and basketball coach at the Ohio State University. He coached the basketball team from 1908 to 1910 and compiled a record of 22–2. He still holds the school coaching record for highest winning percentage.

Kibler joined the Washington College staff in 1913. He coached the basketball team until 1939, going 272–108 during those years.

From 1937 to 1949, he was the President of the Eastern Shore League. He is perhaps best known for a decision he made in 1937 to forfeit all of the Salisbury Indians's wins midway through the season, under shaky evidence. The ruling was later called "stupid," "unjust," and "unfair." Salisbury eventually came back to win the league championship.

Kibler died on October 18, 1971, at Union Memorial Hospital in Baltimore, Maryland. He was inducted into the Washington College Hall of Fame on October 9, 1981.
