= Floyd Stahl =

American collegiate athletic coach (1899-1996)

Biographical details
- Born: July 18, 1899; Paulding County, Ohio, U.S.
- Died: July 26, 1996 (aged 97); Blacklick, Ohio, U.S.

Playing career

Baseball
- 1926: Illinois

Coaching career (HC unless noted)

Basketball
- 1926–1930: Stivers HS OH)
- 1943–1946: Harvard College
- 1950–1958: Ohio State

Baseball
- 1927–1930: Stivers HS OH)
- 1933–1938: Ohio State
- 1939–1946: Harvard College

Football
- 1927–1929: Stivers HS OH)
- 1933–1938: Ohio State (backfield)

Administrative career (AD unless noted)
- 1950–1970: Ohio State (assistant AD)

Head coaching record
- Overall: 108–120 (college basketball); 178–168–1 (college baseball)
- Tournaments: Basketball; 0–2 (NCAA)

Floyd S. Stahl (July 18, 1899 – July 26, 1996) was an American collegiate athletic coach. He held many coaching and administrative positions at the Harvard University and the Ohio State University.

Stahl was the head coach of the Ohio State baseball team from 1930 to 1938. During this same period, he also served as the backfield coach for the Ohio State football team under head coach Francis Schmidt.

In 1939, Stahl joined the staff at Harvard, where he served as the head coach of the baseball team until 1946. Although no games were played in 19944-45 due to World War II, the team won its conference title in his first season. His overall record at Harvard was 54-69. In addition to baseball, Stahl also served as the head coach of the Harvard basketball team from 1943 to 1946, leading the Crimson t their first NCAA tournament appearance in 1946, where they were defeated in the Elite Eight by Ohio State.

The following year, Ohio State rehired Stahl as its head baseball coach. He led the Buckeyes from 1947 to 1950, finishing with an overall record of 129-108-1. In 1950, he transitioned to the basketball program, becoming the head coach of the Ohio State men's team, a position he held until 1958.

While coaching basketball at Ohio State, Stahl also served as an associate athletic director. In 1958, he stepped down from coaching to become the university's assistant athletic director. He returned to coaching in 1966 to lead the Ohio State golf team. He retired on July 1, 1970.

Stahl was inducted into the Ohio State Varsity O Hall of Fame in 1978. Stahl died on July 26, 1996, at his son's home in Blacklick, Ohio.

== Head coaching record ==
=== College basketball ===
Record table
Season	Team	Overall	Conference	Standing	Postseason
Harvard Crimson (Independent) (1943–1946)
1943–44	Harvard College	2–12			
1944–45	Harvard College	2–13			
1945–46	Harvard College	20–3			NCAA Regional Fourth Place
Harvard College:		24–28 (.462)			
Ohio State Buckeyes (Big Ten Conference) (1950–1958)
1950–51	Ohio State	6–16	3–11	T–9th	
1951–52	Ohio State	8–14	6–8	T–5th	
1952–53	Ohio State	10–12	7–11	7th	
1953–54	Ohio State	11–11	5–9	7th	
1954–55	Ohio State	10–12	4–10	10th	
1955–56	Ohio State	16–6	9–5	T–3rd	
1956–57	Ohio State	14–8	9–5	T–3rd	
1957–58	Ohio State	9–13	8–6	T–4th	
Ohio State:		84–92 (.477)	51–65 (.440)		
Total:		108–120 (.474)			
