= Sox Raymond =

American basketball player and coach

Stockton A. "Sox" Raymond (June 19, 1882 – April 22, 1973) was the last basketball head coach at Ohio State University before the school began to give full-year salaries and faculty status to their athletic coaches. He was succeeded by Lynn St. John, who was also the Ohio State athletic director. Raymond had been a 1905 graduate of Ohio State, and a member of the baseball and basketball teams. He remained the Ohio State coach for one year, finishing with a record of 6-3.

Preceded by Atlinson	Ohio State Buckeyes Baseball Captains; 1904	Succeeded by Paterson

Preceded by Thomas Kibler	Ohio State Buckeyes Basketball Head Coaches; 1911	Succeeded by Lynn St. John
