= George Trautman =

American basketball coach and baseball executive (1890-1963)

George Trautman, 1948

George M. "Red" Trautman (January 11, 1890 – June 25, 1963) was an American baseball executive and college men's basketball coach.

== Ohio State ==
As an undergraduate at the Ohio State University, Trautman was a three-sport letterwinner in football, basketball and baseball. After graduation, he became an assistant athletic director under Lynn St. John. As assistant athletic director, Trautman was instrumental in helping to establish the Ohio Relays.

=== Basketball ===
When St. John gave up his basketball coaching duties, he assigned them to Trautman. Trautman held the position of men's basketball head coach for three years. In those three years he had an overall record of 29-33.

=== Honors ===
- Trautman was inducted into the Ohio State Varsity O Hall of Fame in 1978.
- Trautman Field, named in honor of George Trautman, was the home field of the Ohio State baseball team from 1967 to 1996.

== Professional baseball ==
In 1933 Trautman became president of the Columbus Red Birds, a minor league baseball team. Three years later, Trautman was named president of the American Association, the league in which the Red Birds played. He held that position from 1936 through 1945. Trautman moved the office of the league from Durham, North Carolina to Columbus, Ohio. In 1946 Trautman was named General manager of the Detroit Tigers, succeeding Jack Zeller. After two seasons with the Tigers, Trautman was appointed as the new president of the National Association of Professional Baseball Leagues, succeeding William Bramham. Trautman held that position from 1947 until his death in 1963.

=== Accomplishments ===
Under Trautman's leadership, a new relationship was forged between the major leagues and the minor leagues. Territorial rights, which had been in dispute, were established so that if the major leagues took over a National Association city, compensation would be due to both the existing team and its league.

=== George M. Trautman Awards ===
Each year, the Topps Company, in conjunction with Minor League Baseball, awards the George M. Trautman Award to the Topps Player of the Year in each of sixteen domestic minor leagues.

== Trivia ==
- The Ohio State fight song, "Buckeye Battle Cry," was written by Trautman's brother-in-law, Frank Crumit, a musical comedy star.
