= Tippy Dye =

American athlete and coach (1915–2012)

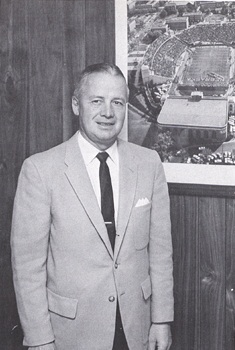
- c. 1966, at Nebraska

Biographical details
- Born: April 1, 1915; Harrisonville, Ohio, U.S.
- Died: April 11, 2012 (aged 97); Grass Valley, California, U.S.

Playing career

Basketball
- 1935–1937: Ohio State

Football
- 1935–1937: Ohio State
- 1937–1938: Cincinnati Bengals
- Positions: Basketball: Guard; Football: Quarterback

Coaching career (HC unless noted)

Basketball
- 1941–1942: Brown
- 1942–1943: Ohio State (assistant)
- 1946–1950: Ohio State
- 1950–1959: Washington

Football
- 1941: Brown (assistant)
- 1942: Ohio State (assistant)

Administrative career (AD unless noted)
- 1959–1962: Wichita
- 1962–1967: Nebraska
- 1967–1974: Northwestern

Head coaching record
- Overall: 220–132

Accomplishments and honors

Championships
- NCAA Division I Regional — Final Four (1953)

William Henry Harrison "Tippy" Dye (April 1, 1915 – April 11, 2012) was an American college athlete, coach, and athletic director. As a basketball head coach, Dye led the University of Washington to its only NCAA Final Four appearance in 1953. As an athletic director, Dye helped build the University of Nebraska football dynasty in the 1960s.

== Playing career ==
Born in Harrisonville, Ohio, Dye enrolled at Ohio State University in 1933 and became a star three-sport athlete for the Buckeyes. He earned three varsity letters as a football quarterback in 1934, 1935, and 1936. His team finished those seasons with records of 7–1, 7–1, and 5–3, respectively, and until 2006 he was the only Buckeye quarterback to win three consecutive games over the University of Michigan. Dye also played guard on the basketball team, lettering in 1935, 1936, and 1937. He was an All-Conference selection in the Big Ten in 1936 and 1937. In 1937 he was also the team's captain. Dye lettered in baseball in 1935 and 1936.

After graduation, Dye played in the 1937 College All-Star Football Game against the Green Bay Packers at Soldier Field (collegians upset the defending champion Packers 6–0). In that game, Dye played in a backfield that included future pro legend, Sammy Baugh. Dye then signed to play with the first incarnation of the Cincinnati Bengals, a member of the second American Football League, in 1937.

== Coaching career ==
After his one-year stint with the Bengals, Dye entered the coaching ranks. He coached first at Grandview Heights High School just outside Columbus from 1939–41. On April 3, 1941, Dye was named the coach at Brown where he also was an assistant coach for the football team under Paul Brown. The next year, Dye returned to Ohio State to be an assistant for the football and basketball teams. The Buckeye's basketball team was coached by Harold Olsen at the time, one of the men who spearheaded the creation of an NCAA basketball tournament in 1939.

During World War II, Dye served for three years in the U.S. Navy. He then went on to become the basketball coach at his alma mater, Ohio State, from 1947 to 1950. In 1950, the Buckeyes won the Big Ten title and finished in the Elite Eight of the NCAA basketball tournament. Dye then moved on to the University of Washington in Seattle, where he was the head coach from 1950 to 1959. Washington won three consecutive Pacific Coast titles (1951–53), and advanced to the 1953 NCAA Final Four. Dye's 156–91 record (.632) with the Huskies ranks him as the fourth winningest coach in UW basketball history, behind coaches Hec Edmundson (488 wins), Marv Harshman (246 wins), and Lorenzo Romar (298 wins).

== Athletic director ==
Long desiring an administrative role, Dye left Seattle in 1959 to become the athletic director at the University of Wichita, at an annual salary of $13,000. After three years, he moved up to the Big Eight Conference at the University of Nebraska in Lincoln in 1962. Prior to hiring Dye, the Nebraska football program had an all-time winning percentage of less than 62%, and had a lackluster two decades; Dye hired Bob Devaney from Wyoming following the 1961 season as head coach. Devaney would coach ten years and win two national championships while being asked to replace Dye as director in 1967.

He hired head basketball coach Joe Cipriano, the scrappy leader from his Final Four team at Washington. Cipriano coached the Huskers for 17 seasons, until his death from cancer in 1980. Dye moved on to Northwestern University in 1967 and retired in 1974, retiring to Florida.

== Name ==
Dye was named after William Henry Harrison, the ninth U.S. President. Harrison used the campaign nickname of Tippecanoe in 1840, which led in turn to Dye's nickname of "Tippy."

== Death ==
Dye died in 2012 in Grass Valley, California, ten days after his 97th birthday. In recent years, he had lived in California with his daughter and her husband following his wife's death, who died in 2001 after 64 years of marriage. He was buried next to her in Pomeroy, Ohio.

== Head coaching record ==
Record table
Season	Team	Overall	Conference	Standing	Postseason
Brown Bears (Independent) (1941–1942)
1941–42	Brown	11–7			
Brown:		11–7 (.611)			
Ohio State Buckeyes (Big Ten Conference) (1946–1950)
1946–47	Ohio State	7–13	5–7	T–6th	
1947–48	Ohio State	10–10	5–7	T–6th	
1948–49	Ohio State	14–7	6–6	T–4th	
1949–50	Ohio State	22–4	11–1	1st	NCAA Regional Third Place
Ohio State:		53–34 (.609)	27–21 (.563)		
Washington Huskies (Pacific Coast Conference) (1950–1959)
1950–51	Washington	24–6	11–5	1st	NCAA Regional Third Place
1951–52	Washington	25–6	14–2	1st North	
1952–53	Washington	28–3	15–1	1st	NCAA Third Place
1953–54	Washington	8–18	7–9	4th North	
1954–55	Washington	13–12	7–9	3rd North	
1955–56	Washington	15–11	11–5	2nd	
1956–57	Washington	17–9	13–3	T–2nd	
1957–58	Washington	8–18	5–11	8th	
1958–59	Washington	18–8	11–5	2nd	
Washington:		156–91 (.632)	94–50 (.653)		
Total:		220–132 (.625)			
National champion Postseason invitational champion Conference regular season champion Conference regular season and conference tournament champion Division regular season champion Division regular season and conference tournament champion Conference tournament champion

== See also ==
- List of NCAA Division I Men's Final Four appearances by coach
