= D. C. Huddleson =

American basketball coach

Don Carlos "D. C." Huddleson (March 8, 1877 – November 6, 1939) was an American college basketball coach. He was the head basketball coach at Ohio State University from 1902 to 1904. His record was 15–6 during those two seasons. It is unknown if Huddleson was the first coach for the program, as the team was established in 1898 without a listed coach.
