= Lynn St. John =

American college sports coach and athletic director (1876-1950)

Biographical details
- Born: November 18, 1876; Union City, Pennsylvania, U.S.
- Died: September 30, 1950 (aged 73); Columbus, Ohio, U.S.

Coaching career (HC unless noted)

Football
- 1902–1905: Wooster
- 1909–1911: Ohio Wesleyan

Basketball
- 1902–1909: Wooster
- 1910–1912: Ohio Wesleyan
- 1911–1919: Ohio State

Baseball
- 1910–1912: Ohio Wesleyan
- 1913–1928: Ohio State

Administrative career (AD unless noted)
- 1912–1947: Ohio State

Head coaching record
- Overall: 31–24–2 (football); 146–112 (basketball); 217–118–9 (baseball)
- Basketball Hall of Fame; Inducted in 1962 (profile)
- College Basketball Hall of Fame; Inducted in 2006

Lynn Wilbur "the Saint" St. John (November 18, 1876 – September 30, 1950) was an American football, basketball, and baseball coach and college athletics administrator. The Union City, Pennsylvania native was the head basketball coach at Ohio State University from 1911 to 1919, and served as the school's second athletic director, a position he held for 33 years. He also served on the NCAA Rules Committee along with James Naismith from 1912 to 1937). In 1956, Ohio State built a new basketball arena and named it St. John Arena after him. In 1962, he was inducted to the Naismith Memorial Basketball Hall of Fame as a contributor.
