= 1898–99 Bucknell Bison men's basketball team =

American college basketball season

1898–99 Bucknell Bison men's basketball
- Conference: Independent
- Record: 3–5
- Head coach: Student coaches
- Captain: C.A. Weymouth
- Home arena: none

The 1898–99 Bucknell Bison men's basketball team represented Bucknell University during the 1898–99 college men's basketball season. The team finished with an overall record of 3–5.

== Schedule ==
Date time, TV	Opponent	Result	Record	Site city, state
12/19/1898*	Danville	L 08–19	1–0	
1/07/1899*	Danville	W 17–09	1–1	
1/16/1899*	Clover Wheelmen	L 16–18	1–2	
1/20/1899*	at Williamsport	L 8–10	1–3	
1/28/1899*	at State College	L 6–17	1–4	
2/10/1899*	at Bridgeton	L 16–26	1–5	
2/21/1899*	at Williamsport	W 14–12	2–5	
3/03/1899*	State College	W 12–08	3–5	
*Non-conference game. (#) Tournament seedings in parentheses.
