= 1944–45 NCAA men's basketball season =

Men's collegiate basketball season

- NCAA Tournament: 1945
- Tournament dates: March 22, 1945 – March 27, 1945
- National Championship: Madison Square Garden; New York City
- NCAA Champions: Oklahoma A&M Aggies
- Helms National Champions: Oklahoma A&M Aggies
- Other champions: DePaul Blue Demons (NIT)
- Player of the Year (Helms): George Mikan, DePaul Blue Demons

The 1944–45 NCAA men's basketball season began in December 1944, progressed through the regular season and conference tournaments, and concluded with the 1945 NCAA basketball tournament championship game on March 27, 1945, at Madison Square Garden in New York, New York. The Oklahoma A&M Aggies won their first NCAA national championship with a 49–45 victory over the NYU Violets.

== Rule changes ==
- Along with the ball on the rim, defensive interference by touching the ball after it had started its downward flight during an opponent's field goal attempt was declared a goal for the shooting team.
- A player fouls out after committing five fouls, including fouls committed in overtime. Previously, a player fouled out after committing four fouls in regulation or a fifth foul in overtime. An extra foul was not permitted in overtime games.
- Unlimited substitution is permitted for the first time. Previously, a player could re-enter a game only twice.
- It became a violation for an offensive player to remain in the free-throw lane for more than three seconds.

== Season headlines ==
- The three-point shot — called a "long goal" at the time — was used experimentally for the first time in a college basketball game, played between Columbia and Fordham on February 7, 1945, with the three-point line 21 feet (6.4 m) from the basket. Columbia made 11 "long goals," while Fordham made nine. The game also experimented with allowing free-throw shooters to take their shots from the normal 15 feet (4.6 m) for one point or to attempt a "long foul" shot from 21 feet (6.4 m) for two points. The teams combined for eight "long fouls" during the game, which Columbia won 73–58.
- The February 7, 1945, game between Columbia and Fordham also saw the first use of the 12-foot-wide (3.7 m) free-throw lane, an experiment at a time when the free-throw lane was standardized at 6 feet (1.8 m) wide. The 12-foot-wide (3.7 m) free-throw lane eventually was adopted for the 1955–56 season.
- After its football team won the 1945 Cotton Bowl Classic on January 1, Oklahoma A&M's basketball team won the 1945 NCAA tournament on March 27, making Oklahoma A&M the first school to win both a college football bowl game and the NCAA basketball tournament in the same academic year.
- More than 18,000 fans attended the final installment of an annual American Red Cross benefit game between the NCAA Tournament and NIT champions at Madison Square Garden. Oklahoma A&M, led by Bob Kurland, defeated George Mikan's DePaul 52–44. Kurland scored 14 points while Mikan scored 9 before fouling out in only 14 minutes of playing time.
- In 1995, the Premo-Porretta Power Poll retroactively selected Iowa as its top-ranked team for the 1944–45 season.

== Premo-Porretta Power Poll ==
In 1995, the Premo-Porretta Power Poll retroactively ranked teams during the 1944–45 season as follows by reviewing results, opponents, and margins of victory.

1945 Premo-Porretta Poll
| Ranking | Team |
|---|---|
| 1 | Iowa (17–1) |
| 2 | Oklahoma A&M (27–4) |
| 3 | DePaul (21–3) |
| 4 | Rice (20–1) |
| 5 | Army (14–1) |
| 6 | Navy (12–2) |
| 7 | Ohio State (15–5) |
| 8 | Bowling Green (24–4) |
| 9 | Notre Dame (15–5) |
| 10 | Kentucky (22–4) |
| 11 | St. John's (21–3) |
| 12 | RPI (13–1) |
| 13 | Akron (21–2) |
| 14 | NYU (16–8) |
| 15 | Muhlenberg (24–4) |
| 16 | South Carolina (19–3) |
| 17 | Valparaiso (21–3) |
| 18 | Tennessee (18–5) |
| 19 | Rhode Island State (20–5) |
| 20 | Hamline (20–4) |
| 21 | North Carolina (22–6) |
| 22 | Temple (16–7) |
| 23 | Illinois (13–7) |
| 24 | Penn (12–5) |
| 25 | Yale (14–4) |

== Conference membership changes ==
| School | Former conference | New conference |
|---|---|---|
| Princeton Tigers | Eastern Intercollegiate Basketball League | Independent |

== Regular season ==
=== Conferences ===
==== Conference winners and tournaments ====
| Conference | Regular Season Winner | Conference player of the year | Conference Tournament | Tournament Venue (City) | Tournament winner |
|---|---|---|---|---|---|
| Big Six Conference | Iowa State | None Selected | No Tournament | | |
| Big Ten Conference | Iowa | None Selected | No Tournament | | |
| Border Conference | New Mexico | None Selected | No Tournament | | |
| Eastern Intercollegiate Basketball League | Penn | None Selected | No Tournament | | |
| Missouri Valley Conference | Oklahoma A&M | None Selected | No Tournament | | |
| Mountain States (Skyline) Conference | Utah | None Selected | No Tournament | | |
| New England Conference | Rhode Island State | None Selected | No Tournament | | |
| Pacific Coast Conference | Oregon & Washington State (North); UCLA (South) | None Selected | No Tournament; Oregon defeated Washington State in North Division best-of-three championship playoff series and defeated UCLA in best-of-three conference championship playoff series | | |
| Rocky Mountain Conference | Colorado College | None Selected | No Tournament | | |
| Southeastern Conference | Kentucky & Tennessee | None Selected | 1945 SEC men's basketball tournament | Jefferson County Armory (Louisville, Kentucky) | Kentucky |
| Southern Conference | South Carolina | None Selected | 1945 Southern Conference men's basketball tournament | Thompson Gym (Raleigh, North Carolina) | North Carolina |
| Southwest Conference | Rice | None Selected | No Tournament | | |

==== Conference standings ====
1944–45 Big Six Conference men's basketball standings
| | Conf. | | | | Overall |
| Team | W | | L | PCT | W | | L | PCT |
|---|---|---|---|---|---|---|---|---|
| Iowa State | 8 | – | 2 | .800 | 11 | – | 5 | .688 |
| Kansas | 7 | – | 3 | .700 | 12 | – | 5 | .706 |
| Oklahoma | 5 | – | 5 | .500 | 12 | – | 13 | .480 |
| Missouri | 5 | – | 5 | .500 | 12 | – | 13 | .480 |
| Kansas State | 4 | – | 6 | .400 | 10 | – | 13 | .435 |
| Nebraska | 1 | – | 9 | .100 | 2 | – | 17 | .105 |

1944–45 Big Ten Conference men's basketball standings
| | Conf. | | | | Overall |
| Team | W | | L | PCT | W | | L | PCT |
|---|---|---|---|---|---|---|---|---|
| Iowa | 11 | – | 1 | .917 | 17 | – | 1 | .944 |
| Ohio State | 10 | – | 2 | .833 | 15 | – | 5 | .750 |
| Illinois | 7 | – | 5 | .583 | 13 | – | 7 | .650 |
| Purdue | 6 | – | 6 | .500 | 9 | – | 11 | .450 |
| Michigan | 5 | – | 7 | .417 | 12 | – | 7 | .632 |
| Wisconsin | 4 | – | 8 | .333 | 10 | – | 11 | .476 |
| Minnesota | 4 | – | 8 | .333 | 8 | – | 13 | .381 |
| Northwestern | 4 | – | 8 | .333 | 7 | – | 12 | .368 |
| Indiana | 3 | – | 9 | .250 | 10 | – | 11 | .476 |
| Chicago | 0 | – | 0 | – | 7 | – | 8 | .467 |

1944–45 Border Conference men's basketball standings
| | Conf. | | | | Overall |
| Team | W | | L | PCT | W | | L | PCT |
|---|---|---|---|---|---|---|---|---|
| New Mexico | 12 | – | 0 | 1.000 | 14 | – | 2 | .875 |
| West Texas State | 9 | – | 3 | .750 | 16 | – | 10 | .615 |
| Arizona State–Flagstaff | 4 | – | 2 | .667 | 5 | – | 6 | .455 |
| New Mexico A&M | 4 | – | 3 | .571 | 9 | – | 5 | .643 |
| Texas Tech | 7 | – | 6 | .538 | 10 | – | 14 | .417 |
| Arizona | 3 | – | 4 | .429 | 7 | – | 11 | .389 |
| Arizona State–Tempe | 3 | – | 5 | .375 | 5 | – | 9 | .357 |
| Texas State M&M | 4 | – | 11 | .267 | 10 | – | 13 | .435 |
| Hardin–Simmons | 2 | – | 14 | .125 | 7 | – | 23 | .233 |

1944–45 Eastern Intercollegiate Basketball League standings
| | Conf. | | | | Overall |
| Team | W | | L | PCT | W | | L | PCT |
|---|---|---|---|---|---|---|---|---|
| Pennsylvania† | 5 | – | 1 | .833 | 12 | – | 5 | .706 |
| Cornell | 4 | – | 2 | .667 | 12 | – | 5 | .706 |
| Dartmouth | 2 | – | 4 | .333 | 6 | – | 8 | .429 |
| Columbia | 1 | – | 5 | .167 | 9 | – | 10 | .474 |
| Yale | | – | | – | 14 | – | 4 | .778 |
| Princeton | | – | | – | 7 | – | 12 | .368 |
| Harvard | | – | | – | 2 | – | 13 | .133 |
† Regular-season championship winner

1944–45 Missouri Valley Conference men's basketball standings
| | Conf. | | | | Overall |
| Team | W | | L | PCT | W | | L | PCT |
|---|---|---|---|---|---|---|---|---|
| Oklahoma A&M† | | – | | – | 27 | – | 4 | .871 |
| Saint Louis | | – | | – | 10 | – | 4 | .714 |
| Washington University | | – | | – | 10 | – | 9 | .526 |
| Drake | | – | | – | 11 | – | 13 | .458 |
| Tulsa | | – | | – | 4 | – | 8 | .333 |
† Regular-season championship winner

1944–45 Mountain States Conference men's basketball standings
| | Conf. | | | | Overall |
| Team | W | | L | PCT | W | | L | PCT |
|---|---|---|---|---|---|---|---|---|
| Utah | 8 | – | 0 | 1.000 | 17 | – | 4 | .810 |
| Colorado | 9 | – | 1 | .900 | 13 | – | 3 | .813 |
| Wyoming | 7 | – | 5 | .583 | 10 | – | 18 | .357 |
| BYU | 5 | – | 5 | .500 | 11 | – | 12 | .478 |
| Utah State | 3 | – | 7 | .300 | 9 | – | 10 | .474 |
| Colorado State | 1 | – | 5 | .167 | 7 | – | 11 | .389 |
| Denver | 1 | – | 11 | .083 | 7 | – | 16 | .304 |

1944–45 Pacific Coast Conference men's basketball standings
| | Conf. | | | | Overall |
| Team | W | | L | PCT | W | | L | PCT |
|---|---|---|---|---|---|---|---|---|
North
| Oregon † | 11 | – | 5 | .688 | 30 | – | 15 | .667 |
| Washington State | 11 | – | 5 | .688 | 23 | – | 13 | .639 |
| Oregon State | 10 | – | 6 | .625 | 20 | – | 8 | .714 |
| Washington | 5 | – | 11 | .313 | 22 | – | 18 | .550 |
| Idaho | 3 | – | 13 | .188 | 13 | – | 20 | .394 |
South
| UCLA | 3 | – | 1 | .750 | 12 | – | 12 | .500 |
| USC | 2 | – | 2 | .500 | 15 | – | 9 | .625 |
| California | 1 | – | 3 | .250 | 7 | – | 8 | .467 |
† North division playoff series and conference playoff series winner

1944–45 Southeastern Conference men's basketball standings
| | Conf. | | | | Overall |
| Team | W | | L | PCT | W | | L | PCT |
|---|---|---|---|---|---|---|---|---|
| Tennessee | 8 | – | 2 | .800 | 18 | – | 5 | .783 |
| Kentucky † | 4 | – | 1 | .800 | 22 | – | 4 | .846 |
| Ole Miss | 3 | – | 1 | .750 | 15 | – | 8 | .652 |
| Florida | 4 | – | 2 | .667 | 7 | – | 12 | .368 |
| Georgia Tech | 7 | – | 4 | .636 | 11 | – | 6 | .647 |
| Alabama | 5 | – | 3 | .625 | 10 | – | 5 | .667 |
| LSU | 3 | – | 3 | .500 | 15 | – | 9 | .625 |
| Tulane | 3 | – | 3 | .500 | 8 | – | 11 | .421 |
| Auburn | 2 | – | 6 | .250 | 3 | – | 14 | .176 |
| Mississippi State | 2 | – | 9 | .182 | 5 | – | 13 | .278 |
| Georgia | 2 | – | 9 | .182 | 5 | – | 16 | .238 |
| Vanderbilt | | – | | – | 6 | – | 6 | .500 |
† Regular-season championship and SEC Tournament winner

1944–45 Southern Conference men's basketball standings
| | Conf. | | | | Overall |
| Team | W | | L | PCT | W | | L | PCT |
|---|---|---|---|---|---|---|---|---|
| South Carolina | 9 | – | 0 | 1.000 | 19 | – | 3 | .864 |
| Richmond | 2 | – | 0 | 1.000 | 3 | – | 4 | .429 |
| Duke | 6 | – | 1 | .857 | 13 | – | 9 | .591 |
| North Carolina † | 11 | – | 3 | .786 | 22 | – | 6 | .786 |
| The Citadel | 8 | – | 4 | .667 | 16 | – | 7 | .696 |
| North Carolina State | 7 | – | 5 | .583 | 10 | – | 11 | .476 |
| William & Mary | 3 | – | 4 | .429 | 7 | – | 11 | .389 |
| Clemson | 3 | – | 5 | .375 | 8 | – | 8 | .500 |
| Maryland | 2 | – | 5 | .286 | 2 | – | 14 | .125 |
| Virginia Tech | 1 | – | 3 | .250 | 6 | – | 8 | .429 |
| Davidson | 2 | – | 7 | .222 | 9 | – | 9 | .500 |
| VMI | 1 | – | 4 | .200 | 2 | – | 10 | .167 |
| Wake Forest | 0 | – | 6 | .000 | 3 | – | 14 | .176 |
| Furman | 0 | – | 8 | .000 | 2 | – | 15 | .118 |
† Southern Conference Tournament winner

1944–45 Southwest Conference men's basketball standings
| | Conf. | | | | Overall |
| Team | W | | L | PCT | W | | L | PCT |
|---|---|---|---|---|---|---|---|---|
| Rice | 12 | – | 0 | 1.000 | 20 | – | 1 | .952 |
| Arkansas | 9 | – | 3 | .750 | 17 | – | 9 | .654 |
| SMU | 7 | – | 5 | .583 | 11 | – | 10 | .524 |
| TCU | 7 | – | 5 | .583 | 9 | – | 20 | .310 |
| Texas | 5 | – | 7 | .417 | 10 | – | 10 | .500 |
| Texas A&M | 2 | – | 10 | .167 | 3 | – | 18 | .143 |
| Baylor | 0 | – | 12 | .000 | 0 | – | 17 | .000 |

=== Major independents ===
A total of 62 college teams played as major independents. Army (14–1) had the best winning percentage (.933). Bowling Green State (24–4) and Muhlenberg (24–4) finished with the most wins.

1944–45 NCAA men's basketball independents standings
| | Conf. | | | | Overall |
| Team | W | | L | PCT | W | | L | PCT |
|---|---|---|---|---|---|---|---|---|
| Army | | – | | – | 14 | – | 1 | .933 |
| Akron | | – | | – | 21 | – | 2 | .913 |
| Lafayette | | – | | – | 16 | – | 2 | .889 |
| DePaul | | – | | – | 21 | – | 3 | .875 |
| St. John's | | – | | – | 21 | – | 3 | .875 |
| Valparaiso | | – | | – | 21 | – | 3 | .875 |
| Bowling Green State | | – | | – | 24 | – | 4 | .857 |
| Muhlenberg | | – | | – | 24 | – | 4 | .857 |
| Navy | | – | | – | 12 | – | 2 | .857 |
| Louisville | | – | | – | 16 | – | 3 | .842 |
| Hamline | | – | | – | 20 | – | 4 | .833 |
| Rhode Island State | | – | | – | 20 | – | 5 | .800 |
| Brown | | – | | – | 15 | – | 4 | .789 |
| Rutgers | | – | | – | 11 | – | 3 | .786 |
| Virginia | | – | | – | 13 | – | 4 | .765 |
| CCNY | | – | | – | 12 | – | 4 | .750 |
| Indiana State | | – | | – | 18 | – | 6 | .750 |
| Notre Dame | | – | | – | 15 | – | 5 | .750 |
| LIU | | – | | – | 14 | – | 5 | .737 |
| Butler | | – | | – | 14 | – | 6 | .700 |
| Wichita Municipal | | – | | – | 14 | – | 6 | .700 |
| Temple | | – | | – | 16 | – | 7 | .696 |
| Toledo | | – | | – | 9 | – | 4 | .692 |
| NYU | | – | | – | 14 | – | 7 | .667 |
| Pittsburgh | | – | | – | 8 | – | 4 | .667 |
| West Virginia | | – | | – | 12 | – | 6 | .667 |
| Marshall | | – | | – | 17 | – | 9 | .654 |
| Western Kentucky State | | – | | – | 17 | – | 10 | .630 |
| Bucknell | | – | | – | 10 | – | 7 | .588 |
| Penn State | | – | | – | 10 | – | 7 | .588 |
| La Salle | | – | | – | 11 | – | 8 | .579 |
| Ohio | | – | | – | 11 | – | 8 | .579 |
| Michigan State | | – | | – | 9 | – | 7 | .563 |
| Niagara | | – | | – | 7 | – | 6 | .538 |
| Miami (Ohio) | | – | | – | 8 | – | 7 | .533 |
| Canisius | | – | | – | 12 | – | 11 | .522 |
| St. Joseph's | | – | | – | 12 | – | 11 | .522 |
| St. Francis (NY) | | – | | – | 9 | – | 9 | .500 |
| Cincinnati | | – | | – | 8 | – | 9 | .471 |
| Nevada | | – | | – | 8 | – | 9 | .471 |
| Northeastern | | – | | – | 7 | – | 8 | .467 |
| Loyola (Md.) | | – | | – | 10 | – | 12 | .455 |
| Saint Mary's | | – | | – | 5 | – | 6 | .455 |
| Western Michigan | | – | | – | 8 | – | 10 | .444 |
| Montana State | | – | | – | 10 | – | 14 | .417 |
| Marquette | | – | | – | 7 | – | 10 | .412 |
| Boston University | | – | | – | 4 | – | 6 | .400 |
| Detroit | | – | | – | 8 | – | 12 | .400 |
| Syracuse | | – | | – | 7 | – | 12 | .368 |
| Villanova | | – | | – | 6 | – | 11 | .353 |
| Colgate | | – | | – | 5 | – | 10 | .333 |
| Loyola (Ill.) | | – | | – | 4 | – | 8 | .333 |
| Maine | | – | | – | 4 | – | 8 | .333 |
| Connecticut | | – | | – | 5 | – | 11 | .313 |
| Holy Cross | | – | | – | 4 | – | 9 | .308 |
| St. Bonaventure | | – | | – | 3 | – | 7 | .300 |
| Fordham | | – | | – | 5 | – | 15 | .250 |
| Montana | | – | | – | 7 | – | 22 | .241 |
| Kent State | | – | | – | 3 | – | 11 | .214 |
| Brooklyn | | – | | – | 3 | – | 15 | .167 |
| Lehigh | | – | | – | 2 | – | 16 | .111 |
| Santa Clara | | – | | – | 0 | – | 11 | .000 |

=== Statistical leaders ===
- Scoring leader – George Mikan averaged 23.3 points per game and was retroactively declared the "unofficial" season scoring leader. Between 1935–36 and 1946–47, there were no official NCAA scoring champions. The statistics during that era were compiled from the National Basketball Committee Official Basketball Guide, which was not regulated by NCAA authorities. Therefore, those players are included in the annual NCAA men's basketball media guide, but are listed as unofficial season scoring leaders. No other personal statistics were tracked during the 1944–45 basketball season.

== Post-season tournaments ==
=== NCAA tournament ===
==== Semifinals & final ====
National Semifinals
NYU | 70^{OT}
Ohio State | 65
Arkansas | 41
Oklahoma A&M | 68

National Final
NYU | 45
Oklahoma A&M | 49

=== National Invitation tournament ===
==== Semifinals & finals ====
Semifinals
Rhode Island State | 53
DePaul | 97
Bowling Green State | 57
St. John's | 44

Finals
DePaul | 71
Bowling Green State | 54
Third place
Rhode Island State | 57
St. John's | 64

== Award winners ==
=== Consensus All-American teams ===
Consensus First Team
| Player | Position | Class | Team |
|---|---|---|---|
| Arnie Ferrin | F | Sophomore | Utah |
| Wyndol Gray | F | Junior | Bowling Green |
| William Hassett | G | Junior | Notre Dame |
| Bill Henry | C | Senior | Rice |
| Walt Kirk | G/F | Junior | Illinois |
| Bob Kurland | C | Junior | Oklahoma A&M |
| George Mikan | C | Junior | DePaul |

Consensus Second Team
| Player | Position | Class | Team |
|---|---|---|---|
| Howie Dallmar | F | Junior | Pennsylvania |
| Don Grate | G | Senior | Ohio State |
| Dale Hall | F | Senior | Army |
| Vince Hanson | C | Sophomore | Washington State |
| Dick Ives | F | Sophomore | Iowa |
| Max Morris | F | Senior | Northwestern |
| Herb Wilkinson | G | Sophomore | Iowa |

=== Major player of the year awards ===
- Helms Foundation Player of the Year: George Mikan, DePaul
- Sporting News Player of the Year: George Mikan, DePaul

=== Other major awards ===
- NIT/Haggerty Award (Top player in NYC area): Bill Kotsores, St. John's

== Coaching changes ==
A number of teams changed coaches during the season and after it ended.

| Team | Former Coach | Interim Coach | New Coach | Reason |
|---|---|---|---|---|
| Alabama | Malcolm Laney | | Hank Crisp | |
| Army | Ed Kelleher | | Stu Holcomb | |
| Auburn | Bob K. Evans | | Ralph Jordan | |
| Baylor | Van Sweet | | Bill Henderson | |
| Boston University | Mel Collard | | Russ Peterson | |
| The Citadel | Ernest Wehman | | Eugene Clark | |
| Colorado State | John S. Davis | | E. D. Taylor | |
| Columbia | Elmer Ripley | | Paul Mooney | Ripley left to coach Notre Dame. |
| Connecticut | Donald White | | Blair Gullion | White left to coach Rutgers. |
| Denver | Cliff Rock | | Ken Loeffler | |
| Furman | Slewyn Edwards | | Lyles Alley | |
| Georgetown | None | | Ken Engles | After a two-year suspension of all athletic programs during World War II, Georgetown University decided to reconstitute its basketball program during the 1945–46 season with a mostly walk-on team. Engles – a Georgetown player returning to school for the 1945–46 academic year after military service – was named the coach, becoming the only player-coach in Georgetown men's basketball history. |
| Holy Cross | Albert Riopel | | Doggie Julian | |
| Kent State | William A. Satterlee | | Harry C. Adams | |
| Lafayette | Arthur R. Winters | | Bill Anderson | |
| Loyola (Md.) | Albert Barthelme | | Lefty Reitz | |
| LSU | Jesse Fatherree | A. L. Swanson | Harry Rabenhorst | |
| Maine | William C. Kenyon | | George E. Allen | |
| Minnesota | Weston Mitchell | | Dave MacMillan | |
| Nebraska | Adolph J. Lewandowski | | L. F. "Pop" Klein | |
| Nevada | Jim Aiken | | Jake Lawlor | |
| Northeastern | Foxy Flumere | | Eugene Pare | |
| Notre Dame | Clem Crowe | | Elmer Ripley | |
| Ole Miss | Edwin Hale | | Buster Poole | |
| Oregon | John A. Warren | | Howard Hobson | |
| Penn | Red Kellett | | Rob Dougherty | |
| Princeton | William Francis Logan | Leonard Hattinger | Wes Fesler | |
| Rice | Joe Davis | | Buster Brannon | |
| Rutgers | Thomas Kenneally | | Donald White | |
| Saint Louis | Dukes Duford | | John Flannigan | |
| Santa Clara | George Barsi | | Ray Pesco | |
| SMU | Roy Bccus | | F. C. Baccus | |
| South Carolina | John D. McMillan | | Frank Johnson | |
| Texas | Bully Gilstrap | | Jack Gray | |
| Texas A&M | Manning Smith | | Marty Karow | |
| Texas State M&M | Charles Finley | | Dale Waters | |
| Tulane | Vernon Hayes | | Clifford Wells | |
| Tulsa | Paul Alyea | | Don Shields | |
| Utah State | D. D. Young | | Bebe Lee | |
| USC | Bobby Muth | | Sam Barry | |
| VMI | Joe Daher | | Jay McWilliams | |
| West Virginia | John Brickles | | Lee Patton | |
| William & Mary | Rube McCray | | Sam B. Holt | |
