= 1944–45 Iowa Hawkeyes men's basketball team =

American college basketball season

1944–45 Iowa Hawkeyes men's basketball
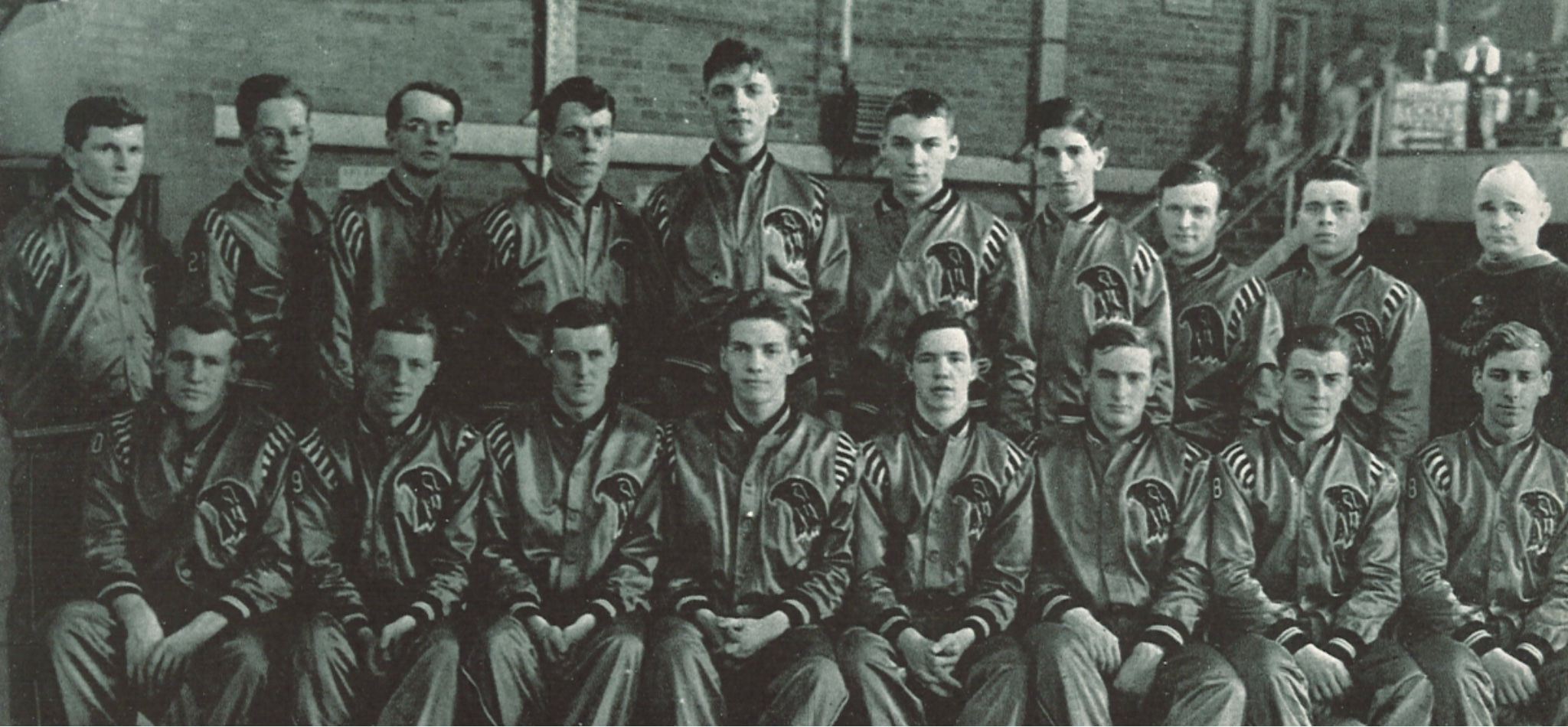

Big Ten Champions
- Conference: Big Ten
- Record: 17–1 (11–1 Big Ten)
- Head coach: Pops Harrison
- MVPs: Dick Ives; Herb Wilkinson
- Home arena: Iowa Field House

1944–45 Big Ten Conference men's basketball standings
	Conf.				Overall
Team	W		L	PCT	W		L	PCT
Iowa	11	–	1	.917	17	–	1	.944
Ohio State	10	–	2	.833	15	–	5	.750
Illinois	7	–	5	.583	13	–	7	.650
Purdue	6	–	6	.500	9	–	11	.450
Michigan	5	–	7	.417	12	–	7	.632
Wisconsin	4	–	8	.333	10	–	11	.476
Minnesota	4	–	8	.333	8	–	13	.381
Northwestern	4	–	8	.333	7	–	12	.368
Indiana	3	–	9	.250	10	–	11	.476
Chicago	0	–	0	–	7	–	8	.467

The 1944–45 Iowa Hawkeyes men's basketball team represented the University of Iowa in intercollegiate basketball during the 1944–45 season. The team finished the season with a 17–1 record and was retroactively ranked as the top team of the season by the Premo-Porretta Power Poll.

Despite being Big Ten champions, Iowa declined a bid to the 8-team NCAA tournament. The conference's bid went to Ohio State. The Buckeyes, who finished a game behind Iowa in the standings, defeated Kentucky to reach the Final Four.

== Roster ==
1944–45 Iowa Hawkeyes men's basketball team
Players
Coaches

Pos.	#	Name	Height	Weight	Year	Previous school	Hometown
F	3	Murray Wier	5 ft 9 in (1.75 m)	150 lb (68 kg)	Fr	Muscatine HS	Muscatine, IA
F	4	Ned Postels	—	—	Jr
	7	Dick Ives	6 ft 1 in (1.85 m)	155 lb (70 kg)	So	–	Diagonal, Iowa
C	11	Clayton Wilkinson	—	—	Jr	East HS	Salt Lake City, Utah
G	20	Jack Spencer	—	—	So
G	28	Herb Wilkinson	6 ft 4 in (1.93 m)	—	So	East HS	Salt Lake City, Utah

Head coach

- Pops Harrison (Iowa)

Assistant coach(es)

Legend

- (C) Team captain
- (S) Suspended
- (I) Ineligible
- (W) Walk-on
- Injured
- Current redshirt

== Schedule and results ==
Date time, TV	Opponent	Result	Record	Site city, state
Regular reason
Dec 9, 1944*	Western Illinois	W 101–23	1–0	Iowa Field House; Iowa City, Iowa
Dec 11, 1944*	South Dakota State	W 87–37	2–0	Iowa Field House; Iowa City, Iowa
Dec 16, 1944*	at Nebraska; Rivalry	W 61–45	3–0	Nebraska Coliseum; Lincoln, Nebraska
Dec 19, 1944*	Denver	W 60–41	4–0	Iowa Field House; Iowa City, Iowa
Dec 23, 1944*	Notre Dame	W 63–46	5–0	Iowa Field House; Iowa City, Iowa
Dec 30, 1944*	Michigan State	W 66–29	6–0	Iowa Field House; Iowa City, Iowa
Jan 6, 1945	Minnesota	W 41–34	7–0 (1–0)	Iowa Field House; Iowa City, Iowa
Jan 13, 1945	Purdue	W 61–34	8–0 (2–0)	Iowa Field House; Iowa City, Iowa
Jan 19, 1945	at Michigan	W 29–27	9–0 (3–0)	Yost Field House; Ann Arbor, Michigan
Jan 22, 1945	Indiana	W 56–51	10–0 (4–0)	Iowa Field House; Iowa City, Iowa
Jan 26, 1945	at Illinois; Rivalry	L 42–43	10–1 (4–1)	Huff Hall (6,000); Champaign, Illinois
Feb 3, 1945	Michigan	W 50–37	11–1 (5–1)	Iowa Field House; Iowa City, Iowa
Feb 10, 1945	at Indiana	W 45–40	12–1 (6–1)	The Fieldhouse; Bloomington, Indiana
Feb 12, 1945	at Purdue	W 48–43	13–1 (7–1)	Mackey Arena; West Lafayette, Indiana
Feb 19, 1945	Wisconsin	W 54–53	14–1 (8–1)	Iowa Field House; Iowa City, Iowa
Feb 24, 1945	at Wisconsin	W 68–38	15–1 (9–1)	Wisconsin Field House; Madison, Wisconsin
Feb 26, 1945	at Minnesota	W 55–48	16–1 (10–1)	Williams Arena; Minneapolis, Minnesota
Mar 3, 1945	Illinois	W 43–37	17–1 (11–1)	Iowa Field House; Iowa City, Iowa
*Non-conference game. ^{#}Rankings from AP Poll. (#) Tournament seedings in parentheses.

== Awards and honors ==
- Dick Ives – Consensus Second-Team All-American
- Herb Wilkinson – Consensus Second-Team All-American
