= List of Iowa Hawkeyes men's basketball head coaches =

The following is a list of Iowa Hawkeyes men's basketball head coaches at the University of Iowa in Iowa City, Iowa. Twenty-three individuals have served as head coach for the Iowa Hawkeyes men's basketball program in its 124-season history. Ed Rule, Rollie Williams, and Bucky O'Connor each served more than one tenure as head coach. Eighteen of the 23 coaches have winning records at Iowa. By default, the list is sorted by the number of seasons in which the coaches served as head coach. The list can be sorted by clicking on the column header. Numbers are updated through the end of the 2024–2025 season.

Four Iowa Hawkeye men's basketball coaches have been inducted into the Naismith Basketball Hall of Fame: Sam Barry, Ralph Miller, Lute Olson and George Raveling.

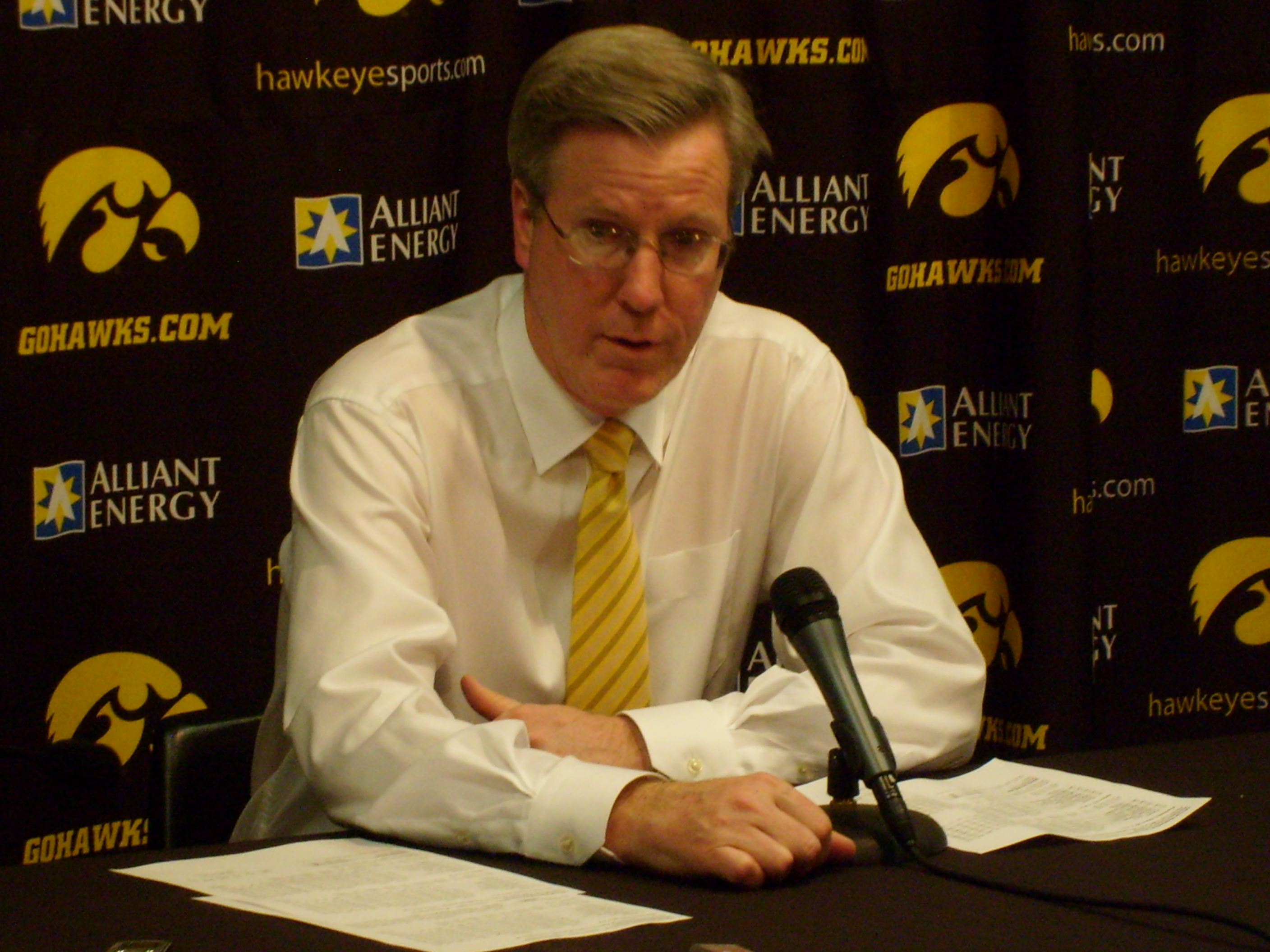
Fran McCaffery, the head coach in 2010–2025, is the longest-tenured and winningest coach in school history.

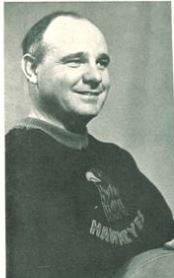
Pops Harrison had the best winning percentage in school history (.700).

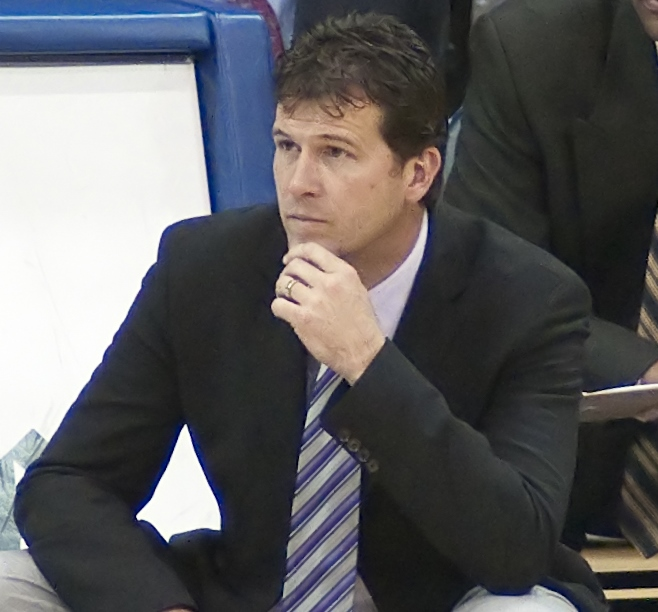
Steve Alford led the Hawkeyes to three NCAA Tournament appearances.

Tenure	Coach	Years	Record	Pct.
2010–2025	Fran McCaffery	15	297–207	.589
1929–1942, 1950-1951	Rollie Williams	14	139–131	.515
1986–1999	Tom Davis	13	269–140	.658
1974–1983	Lute Olson*	9	165–95	.635
1999–2007	Steve Alford	8	152–106	.589
1949–1950, 1951–1958	Bucky O'Connor	8	114–59	.659
1942-1950	Pops Harrison	8	98–42	.700
1922–1929	Sam Barry*	7	62–54	.534
1964–1970	Ralph Miller*	6	95–51	.651
1958–1964	Sharm Scheuerman	6	72–69	.511
1913–1918	Maury Kent	5	42–36	.538
1970–1974	Dick Schultz	4	41–55	.427
1901–1902, 1903–1904, 1905–1907	Ed Rule	4	32–14	.696
1983–1986	George Raveling*	3	54–38	.587
2007–2010	Todd Lickliter	3	38–58	.396
1907–1910	John Griffith	3	29–16	.644
1919–1922	James Ashmore	3	29–26	.527
1910–1912	Walter Stewart	2	15–12	.556
1912–1913	Floyd Thomas	1	9–13	.409
1918–1919	Edwin Bannick	1	8–7	.533
1904–1905	John Chalmers	1	6–8	.429
1902–1903	Fred Bailey	1	4–3	.571
2025–Present	Ben McCollum	1	24–13	.649
1902–Present	23 coaches	124 seasons	Record	Pct.
