= Bob Lewis (basketball, born 1925) =

American basketball player

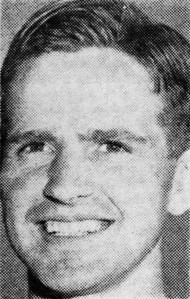
- Lewis, c. 1949

Personal information
- Born: October 6, 1925 Salt Lake City, Utah, U.S.
- Died: April 11, 2012 (aged 86) Tucson, Arizona, U.S.
- Listed height: 6 ft 4 in (1.93 m)

Career information
- High school: East (Salt Lake City, Utah)
- College: Utah (1943–1944); Stanford (1946–1949)
- Position: Forward

Career highlights
- NCAA champion (1944)

Robert S. Lewis, Jr. (October 6, 1925 – April 11, 2012) was an American college basketball player notable as a starting forward on the University of Utah's 1944 National Championship team.

== Early life and education ==
Lewis was born and grew up in Salt Lake City, the son of a University of Utah professor. He and his twin brother Fred attended East High School and came to their father's university to play basketball for coach Vadal Peterson in the fall of 1943. Due to the shortage of college-aged men associated with World War II, freshmen were eligible to play varsity basketball; freshmen did not become permanently eligible until 1973.

Known as the "Blitz Kids," Lewis joined classmates Arnie Ferrin, Dick Smuin, and Herb Wilkinson to become the first champions in NCAA men's basketball history to feature four freshmen in the starting lineup.

== Career ==
Following the championship season, the Lewis twins joined the Army for World War II. After their stint in the military, both Lewises moved to Stanford University to finish their academic careers. Bob Lewis played basketball for Stanford coach Everett Dean and played three years for the Indians. Lewis was noted as a strong defensive player during his time in Palo Alto. In addition to basketball, Lewis was a standout tennis player at Stanford.

Lewis graduated with an engineering degree, and went into a career in the aerospace industry.

== Death ==
Lewis died on April 11, 2012, at his home in Tucson, Arizona.
