= 1944–45 UCLA Bruins men's basketball team =

American college basketball season

1944–45 UCLA Bruins men's basketball

PCC Southern Division
- Conference: Pacific Coast Conference
- South
- Record: 12–12 (3–1 PCC)
- Head coach: Wilbur Johns (6th season)
- Assistant coach: Jack Montgomery
- Home arena: Men's Gym

1944–45 Pacific Coast Conference men's basketball standings
	Conf.				Overall
Team	W		L	PCT	W		L	PCT
North
Oregon †	11	–	5	.688	30	–	15	.667
Washington State	11	–	5	.688	23	–	13	.639
Oregon State	10	–	6	.625	20	–	8	.714
Washington	5	–	11	.313	22	–	18	.550
Idaho	3	–	13	.188	13	–	20	.394
South
UCLA	3	–	1	.750	12	–	12	.500
USC	2	–	2	.500	15	–	9	.625
California	1	–	3	.250	7	–	8	.467
† North division playoff series and conference playoff series winner

The 1944–45 UCLA Bruins men's basketball team represented the University of California, Los Angeles during the 1944–45 NCAA men's basketball season and were members of the Pacific Coast Conference (PCC). The Bruins were led by sixth year head coach Wilbur Johns. They finished the regular season with a 12–12 record overall and won the PCC Southern Division with a conference record of 3–1. It was their first title in the PCC since joining the conference in 1927–28. As a measure during World War II after Stanford dropped basketball, remaining Southern Division foes UCLA, USC, and California played each other twice in games that counted towards league standings.

== Previous season ==
The Bruins finished the regular season with a record of 10–10 and were second in the PCC southern division with a record of 3–3.

== Roster ==
1944–45 UCLA Bruins men's basketball team
Players
Coaches

Pos.	#	Name	Height	Weight	Year	Hometown
G	17	Bob Arnold	6 ft 0 in (1.83 m)	172 lb (78 kg)
G	16	Dick Birnie	—	—
F	4	Grant Clothier	—	—
F	6	Frank Freriks	5 ft 9 in (1.75 m)	150 lb (68 kg)
C	14	Glen Grant	6 ft 0 in (1.83 m)	185 lb (84 kg)
C	13	Dick Hough	6 ft 2 in (1.88 m)	165 lb (75 kg)
F	23	Hal Michaels	5 ft 10 in (1.78 m)	150 lb (68 kg)
G		Jack Myers	6 ft 2 in (1.88 m)	205 lb (93 kg)
G	20	Bill Putnam (C)	6 ft 0 in (1.83 m)	181 lb (82 kg)
G	3	Bill Rankin (C)	6 ft 4 in (1.93 m)	185 lb (84 kg)	So
G		Chuck Stewart	6 ft 3 in (1.91 m)	175 lb (79 kg)
F	5	Ralph Witt	—	—

Head coach

Wilbur Johns (UCLA)

Assistant coach(es)

- Jack Montgomery (UCLA)

Legend

- (C) Team captain
- (S) Suspended
- (I) Ineligible
- (W) Walk-on
- Injured
- Current redshirt

Roster
Last update: 30 January 2018

== Schedule ==
Date time, TV	Rank^{#}	Opponent^{#}	Result	Record	Site city, state
Regular Season
November 30, 1944*		Los Angeles City College	W 44–30	1–0	Men's Gym; Los Angeles, CA
December 1, 1944*		Occidental	L 35–36	1–1	Men's Gym; Los Angeles, CA
December 2, 1944*		El Toro Marines	L 33–37	1–2	Men's Gym; Los Angeles, CA
December 8, 1944*		at Pepperdine	L 33–36	1–3	Los Angeles, CA
December 9, 1944*		at San Diego Marines	L 29–53	1–4	San Diego, CA
December 15, 1944*		at Occidental	L 45–47	1–5	Los Angeles, CA
December 16, 1944*		at San Diego Navy	L 32–35	1–6	San Diego, CA
December 22, 1944*		at Santa Ana Army Air Base	L 35–47	1–7	Santa Ana, CA
December 29, 1944*		at Caltech	W 42–37	2–7	Pasadena, CA
December 30, 1944*		20th Century Fox	L 56–76	2–8	Men's Gym; Los Angeles, CA
January 5, 1945		at USC	L 25–53	2–9 (0–1)	Pan-Pacific Auditorium; Los Angeles, CA
January 6, 1945*		at Camp Ross	L 44–50	2–10	Port of Los Angeles, CA
January 13, 1945		at California	W 37–26	3–10 (1–1)	Men's Gym; Berkeley, CA
January 18, 1945*		San Diego Coast Guard	W 46–40	4–10	Men's Gym; Los Angeles, CA
January 19, 1945*		Pepperdine	W 41–28	5–10	Men's Gym; Los Angeles, CA
January 20, 1945*		March Field	W 57–50	6–10	Men's Gym; Los Angeles, CA
January 26, 1945*		USC	W 41–36	7–10	Men's Gym; Los Angeles, CA
January 27, 1945*		San Diego Naval Training Center	W 40–37	8–10	Men's Gym; Los Angeles, CA
February 2, 1945*		Fairfield Skymasters	L 26–29	8–11	Men's Gym; Los Angeles, CA
February 3, 1945*		Caltech	W 29–28	9–11	Men's Gym; Los Angeles, CA
February 9, 1945*		Camp Ross	W 47–42	10–11	Men's Gym; Los Angeles, CA
February 17, 1945		California	W 50–44	11–11 (2–1)	Men's Gym; Los Angeles, CA
February 16, 1945		USC	W 34–28	12–11 (3–1)	Men's Gym; Los Angeles, CA
February 23, 1945*		USC	L 20–37	12–12	Pan-Pacific Auditorium; Los Angeles, CA
*Non-conference game. ^{#}Rankings from AP Poll. (#) Tournament seedings in parentheses. All times are in Pacific Time.

== Awards and honors ==
- Bill Putnam, second-team All-American – Helms
