= Bill Putnam (basketball) =

American basketball player (1922–1992)

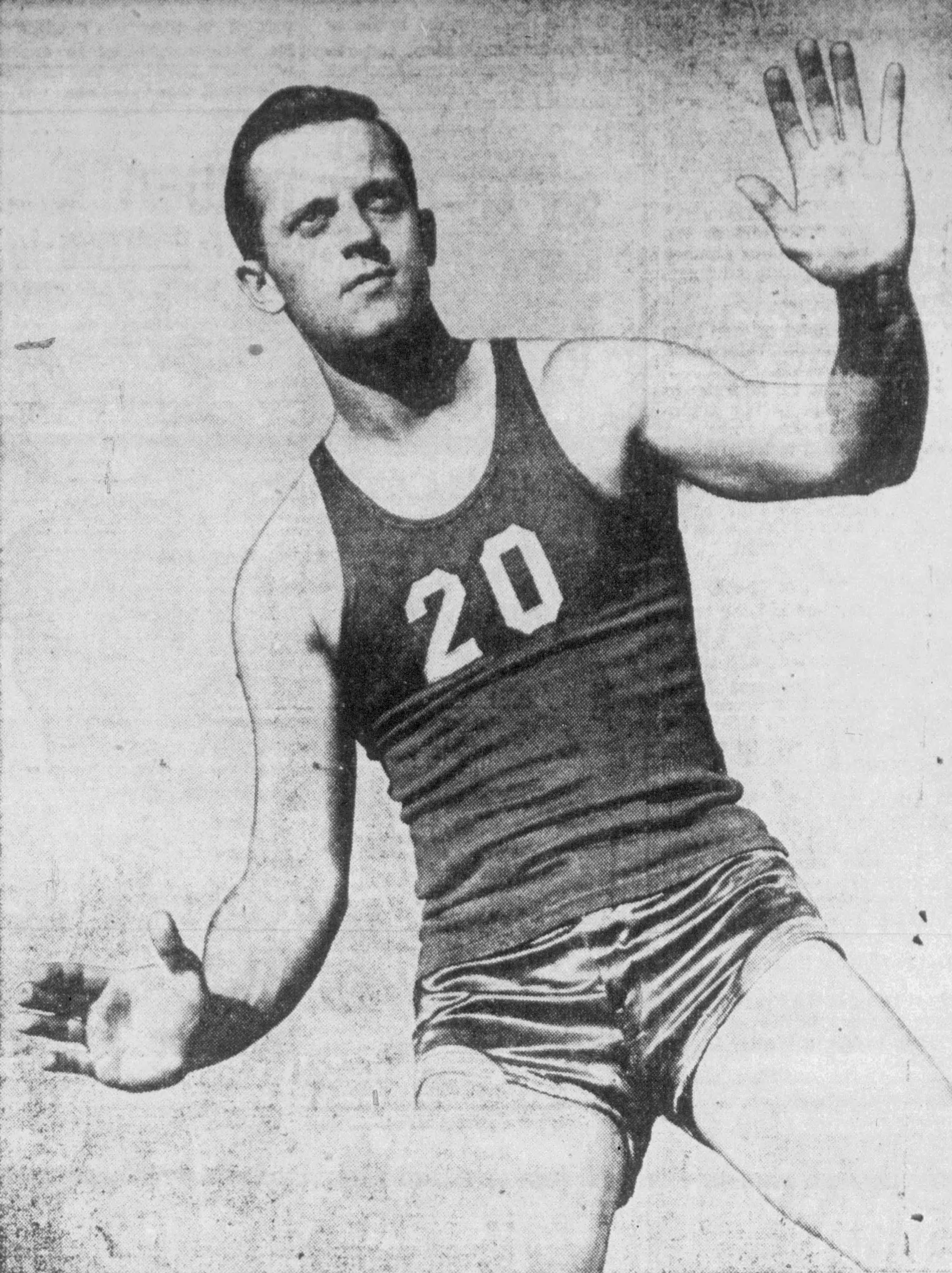
- Putnam with UCLA c. 1945

Personal information
- Born: August 12, 1922 San Francisco, California, U.S.
- Died: December 12, 1992 (aged 70)
- Listed height: 6 ft 0 in (1.83 m)
- Listed weight: 210 lb (95 kg)

Career information
- High school: McClatchy (Sacramento, California)
- College: UCLA (1943–1945)
- Position: Guard
- Number: 20
- Coaching career: 1946–1962

Career history

Coaching
- 1946–1962: UCLA (assistant)

Career highlights
- As player: Second-team All-American – Helms (1945); First-team All-PCC Southern Division (1945)

William Charles Putnam (August 12, 1922 – December 12, 1992) was an American college basketball player for the UCLA Bruins. He earned second-team All-American honors in 1945, when he helped lead the Bruins to their first basketball championship, winning the Pacific Coast Conference (PCC) Southern Division title. Putnam was later an assistant coach and assistant athletic director at UCLA. He was inducted into the UCLA Athletics Hall of Fame.

== Early life ==
Putnam was born on August 12, 1922, in San Francisco. His father, George, was part owner of the San Francisco Seals baseball team. Putnam's family moved to Sacramento, California, in the early 1930s. Growing up there, he began playing basketball in the 10th grade at McClatchy High School. He was the school's first four-sport athlete, competing also in football, baseball and track and field.

== College playing career ==
Putnam played basketball at Sacramento City College (SCC) from 1940 to 1942, leading the Panthers to two second-place finishes in a then-15-team conference. The 6-foot (1.8 m), 210-pound (95 kg) guard transferred to the University of California, Los Angeles, to play for the Bruins under coach Wilbur Johns. Putnam and fellow junior college transfer Don Barksdale joined UCLA midseason in 1942–43, following the Bruins' loss of Johnny Fryer, an Army reserve who was called to serve in World War II. While Barksdale played, Johns chose to keep Putnam inactive and preserve a year of his eligibility.

Putnam started at guard for UCLA in 1943–44. As co-captain of the Bruins with Bill Rankin in 1944–45, he helped lead the team to its first basketball championship, winning the PCC Southern Division title with a 34–28 victory over their crosstown rivals, USC. The Bruins were not able to face the Northern Division champion in a playoff due to scheduling conflicts arising from UCLA's roster being all Navy trainees. Putnam was named a second-team All-American by the Helms Athletic Foundation, becoming the UCLA basketball program's second All-American, (Note: Dick Linthicum was the first, selected in 1931 and 1932, as well as UCLA's first All-American in any sport.) and he was a unanimous selection to the All-PCC Southern Division team.

Putnam also earned a letter in football as a guard in 1944. He was posthumously named to the UCLA Athletics Hall of Fame in 1993, and the SCC Men's Basketball Court of Honor in 2001.

== Later years ==
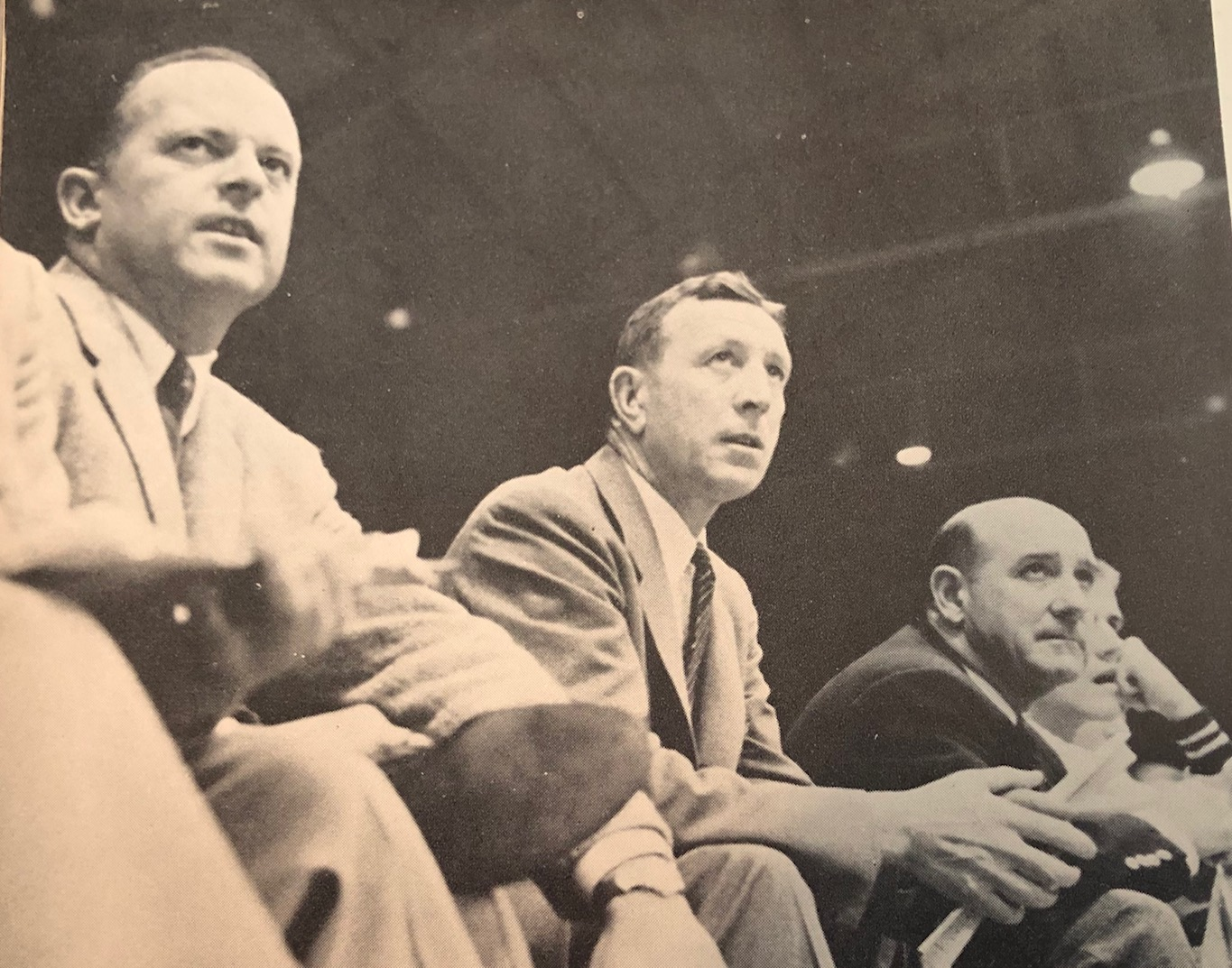
Putnam (left) as an assistant coach at UCLA under John Wooden (center) c. 1958.

In 1945, Putnam played on the 20th Century-Fox team that advanced to the consolation round of the Amateur Athletic Union's national basketball tournament, finishing in fourth place.

After graduating from college in 1945, Putnam was an assistant coach under Johns for one season in 1946–47, and later under John Wooden from 1948 to 1963. Wooden called him "one of the most loyal, hard-working coaches who ever worked with me". Additionally in 1948, Putnam became an assistant director of athletics under Johns; Putnam was responsible for UCLA athletic teams' travel arrangements. He was also the Bruins' junior varsity head coach for two seasons. He left UCLA in 1963, and started a career in real estate in Southern California.

Putnam died of a heart attack on December 12, 1992, while returning home from a UCLA basketball game at Pauley Pavilion against San Diego. He was 70.

== See also ==
- 1945 NCAA Men's Basketball All-Americans
