= 1944–45 Georgia Bulldogs basketball team =

American college basketball season

1944–45 Georgia Bulldogs basketball
- Conference: Southeastern Conference
- Record: 5–16 (2–9 SEC)
- Head coach: Elmer A. Lampe (8th season)
- Captains: Reid Mosely; Ross Maddox
- Home arena: Woodruff Hall

1944–45 Southeastern Conference men's basketball standings
	Conf.				Overall
Team	W		L	PCT	W		L	PCT
Tennessee	8	–	2	.800	18	–	5	.783
Kentucky †	4	–	1	.800	22	–	4	.846
Ole Miss	3	–	1	.750	15	–	8	.652
Florida	4	–	2	.667	7	–	12	.368
Georgia Tech	7	–	4	.636	11	–	6	.647
Alabama	5	–	3	.625	10	–	5	.667
LSU	3	–	3	.500	15	–	9	.625
Tulane	3	–	3	.500	8	–	11	.421
Auburn	2	–	6	.250	3	–	14	.176
Mississippi State	2	–	9	.182	5	–	13	.278
Georgia	2	–	9	.182	5	–	16	.238
Vanderbilt		–		–	6	–	6	.500
† Regular-season championship and SEC Tournament winner

The 1944–45 Georgia Bulldogs basketball team represented the University of Georgia as a member of the Southeastern Conference (SEC) during the 1944–45 NCAA men's basketball season. Led by eighth-year head coach Elmer A. Lampe, the Bulldogs compiled an overall record of 5–16 with a mark of 2–9 in conference play, tying for tenth place in the SEC. The team captains were Reid Mosely and Ross Maddox.

== Schedule ==
Date time, TV	Opponent	Result	Record	Site city, state
1/8/1945	Clemson	W 37-30	1–0	Athens, GA
1/10/1945	Lawson General Hospital	L 45-59	1–1	Athens, GA
1/12/1945	at Jax N.A.S.	L 41-59	1–2	
1/13/1945	at Florida	L 28-46	1–3	
1/15/1945	at South Carolina	L 25-53	1–4	
1/18/1945	at Auburn	W 59-50	2–4	
1/19/1945	at Alabama	L 28-54	2–5	
1/23/1945	at Clemson	W 51-40	3–5	
1/26/1945	Mercer	L 36-51	3–6	Athens, GA
1/29/1945	at Kentucky	L 37-73	3–7	
1/30/1945	at Tennessee	L 26-42	3–8	
2/3/1945	Auburn	W 59-43	4–8	Athens, GA
2/5/1945	at Lawson General Hospital	L 39-57	4–9	
2/9/1945	at Georgia Tech	L 38-70	4–10	
2/12/1945	Tennessee	L 38-48	4–11	Athens, GA
2/15/1945	Alabama	L 59-61	4–12	Athens, GA
2/17/1945	Florida	L 36-52	4–13	Athens, GA
2/19/1945	at Mercer	W 56-40	5–13	
2/24/1945	Georgia Tech	L 42-69	5–14	Athens, GA
2/26/1945	at Cherry Pt. USMC	L 40-56	5–15	
2/28/1945	Georgia Tech	L 49-68	5–16	Athens, GA
*Non-conference game. (#) Tournament seedings in parentheses.
