= 1944–45 Oregon Webfoots men's basketball team =

American college basketball season

1944–45 Oregon Webfoots men's basketball

NCAA Regional Third Place, W 69–66 vs. Utah
- Conference: Pacific Coast Conference
- North
- Record: 30–15 (11–5 PCC)
- Head coach: John A. Warren (1st season)
- Home arena: McArthur Court

1944–45 Pacific Coast Conference men's basketball standings
	Conf.				Overall
Team	W		L	PCT	W		L	PCT
North
Oregon †	11	–	5	.688	30	–	15	.667
Washington State	11	–	5	.688	23	–	13	.639
Oregon State	10	–	6	.625	20	–	8	.714
Washington	5	–	11	.313	22	–	18	.550
Idaho	3	–	13	.188	13	–	20	.394
South
UCLA	3	–	1	.750	12	–	12	.500
USC	2	–	2	.500	15	–	9	.625
California	1	–	3	.250	7	–	8	.467
† North division playoff series and conference playoff series winner

The 1944–45 Oregon Webfoots men's basketball team were a college basketball team that represented the University of Oregon during the 1944–45 NCAA men's basketball season. The Webfoots, coached by John A. Warren, played in the Pacific Coast Conference (PCC) and compiled a 30–15 win–loss record in regular and postseason competition and an 11–5 record in conference play. Overall they finished with a home record of 13–6, away record of 16–7, and a neutral record of 1–2. They finished 3rd regionally in the NCAA Tournament. With a total of 45 games played, that is the most in NCAA history for one season.

== Schedule ==
Pacific Coast Conference Standing: 1st
**Date**	**Opponent***	**Location**	**Time**^{#}	Result	**Overall**	**Conference**
**Regular Season Games**
November 10, 1944	Seattle Coast Guard	Home		L 58-67	0–1	
November 11, 1944	Seattle Coast Guard	Home		L 44-53	0–2	
November 17, 1944	Willamette Navy	Home		W 55-35	1–2	
November 18, 1944	Willamette	Away		W 69-49	2–2	
November 22, 1944	Astoria Navy	Home		W 60-49	3–2	
November 24, 1944	Klamath Falls Marines	Away		W 51-36	4–2	
November 25, 1944	Klamath Falls Marines	Away		W 60-40	5–2	
November 29, 1944	Fees Music	Home		L 38-40	5–3	
November 30, 1944	Tillamook Navy	Home		W 60-36	6–3	
December 1, 1944	Willamette Navy	Home		W 70-51	7–3	
December 2, 1944	Willamette Navy	Away		W 47-36	8–3	
December 15, 1944	Klamath Falls Marines	Home		W 68-65	9–3	
December 16, 1944	Klamath Falls Marines	Home		W 70-57	10–3	
December 18, 1944	British Columbia	Away		W 55-51	11–3	
December 19, 1944	British Columbia	Away		W 63-59	12–3	
December 20, 1944	Western Washington	Away		W 50-45	13–3	
December 21, 1944	Fort Lewis	Away		L 38-52	13–4	
December 22, 1944	Washington	Astoria, OR		L 18-31	13–5	
December 23, 1944	Washington	Away		L 31-32	13–6	
December 26, 1944	Vancouver CC	Away		L 37-49	13–7	
December 27, 1944	Fees Music	Away		L 43-50	13–8	
December 28, 1944	Oregon Medical	Away		W 49-39	14–8	
December 29, 1944	Hanford All Stars	Away		W 52-33	15–8	
December 30, 1944	Tillamook Navy	Away		W 62-41	16–8	
January 5, 1945	**Idaho**	Away		W 48-38	17–8	1–0
January 6, 1945	**Idaho**	Away		W 41-38	18–8	2–0
January 8, 1945	**Washington State University**	Away		L 36-45	18–9	2–1
January 9, 1945	**Washington State University**	Away		W 47-34	19–9	3–1
January 13, 1945	**Oregon State**	Away		W 51-44	20–9	4–1
January 19, 1945	**Washington State University**	Home		L 43-54	20–10	4–2
January 20, 1945	**Washington State University**	Home		W 64-48	21–10	5–2
January 26, 1945	**Washington**	Home		W 59-36	22–10	6–2
January 27, 1945	**Washington**	Home		W 54-51	23–10	7–2
February 2, 1945	**Washington**	Away		L 56-59	23–11	7–3
February 3, 1945	**Washington**	Away		W 54-51	24–11	8–3
February 10, 1945	**Oregon State**	Home		L 51-55	24–12	8–4
February 17, 1945	**Oregon State**	Away		L 43-45	24–13	8–5
February 20, 1945	**Idaho**	Home		W 56-45	25–13	9–5
February 21, 1945	**Idaho**	Home		W 67-47	26–13	10–5
March 3, 1945	**Oregon State**	Home		W 47-38	27–13	11–5
**Pacific Coast Conference Northern Division Playoff**
March 10, 1945	Washington State University	Away		W 51-41	28–13	11–5
March 16, 1945	Washington State University	Home		L 48-53	28–14	11–5
March 17, 1945	Washington State University	Home		W 39-37	29–14	11–5
**NCAA tournament**
March 23, 1945	Arkansas	Kansas City, MO		L 76-79	29–15	11–5
March 24, 1945	Utah	Kansas City, MO		W 69-66	30–15	11–5
All times are in PST. Conference games in **BOLD**.

== Notes and references ==
- 2010–11 Oregon Men's Basketball Media Guide (PDF). University of Oregon. 2010. p. 80.
- 2010–11 Washington Men's Basketball Media Guide (PDF). University of Washington. 2010. p. 42. Archived (PDF) from the original on December 9, 2010.
