= Hank O'Keeffe =

American basketball player

Personal information
- Born: December 12, 1923 Malverne, New York, U.S.
- Died: December 27, 2011 (aged 88) Savannah, Georgia, U.S.
- Listed height: 6 ft 3 in (1.91 m)
- Listed weight: 195 lb (88 kg)

Career information
- High school: Malverne (Malverne, New York)
- College: Canisius (1942–1943); RPI (1943–1945); Canisius (1946–1948)
- NBA draft: 1948: undrafted
- Position: Forward

Career history
- 1948–1949: Syracuse Nationals
- 1949–1950: Wilkes-Barre Barons
- 1950–1951: Erie

Career highlights
- Third-team All-American – SN (1945)

Henry J. O'Keeffe (December 12, 1923 – December 27, 2011) was an American professional basketball player. He played for the Syracuse Nationals in the National Basketball League and the Wilkes-Barre Barons in the American Basketball League.

O'Keeffe's college career was split between Canisius College and Rensselaer Polytechnic Institute (RPI), with him serving in World War II during this time. In his post-basketball career, O'Keeffe began his insurance agency in Buffalo, New York and then worked as a real estate agent in Sarasota, Florida. He retired in Savannah, Georgia. O'Keeffe was married twice and had six children.
