= 1944–45 Iowa State Cyclones men's basketball team =

American college basketball season

1944–45 Iowa State Cyclones men's basketball

Big Six Champions
- Conference: Big Six Conference
- Record: 11–5 (8–2 Big Six)
- Head coach: Louis Menze (17th season)
- Home arena: State Gymnasium

1944–45 Big Six Conference men's basketball standings
| | Conf. | | | | Overall |
| Team | W | | L | PCT | W | | L | PCT |
|---|---|---|---|---|---|---|---|---|
| Iowa State | 8 | – | 2 | .800 | 11 | – | 5 | .688 |
| Kansas | 7 | – | 3 | .700 | 12 | – | 5 | .706 |
| Oklahoma | 5 | – | 5 | .500 | 12 | – | 13 | .480 |
| Missouri | 5 | – | 5 | .500 | 12 | – | 13 | .480 |
| Kansas State | 4 | – | 6 | .400 | 10 | – | 13 | .435 |
| Nebraska | 1 | – | 9 | .100 | 2 | – | 17 | .105 |

The 1944–45 Iowa State Cyclones men's basketball team represented Iowa State University during the 1944–45 NCAA men's basketball season. The Cyclones were coached by Louis Menze, who was in his seventeenth season with the team. They played their home games at the State Gymnasium in Ames, Iowa.

They finished the season 11–5, 8–2 in Big Six play to finish in first place and win the Big Six championship. They lost to Kansas, 50–35 on January 27, to drop their record to 5-5 (2-2) before winning their last six games en route to a conference championship. The March 2, 1945 contest turned into a de facto championship game, with the Cyclones routing the Jayhawks, 61–39, to win their second consecutive Big Six championship.

Jim Myers was awarded a first team All-Big Six distinction by the United Press, while Bob Mott garnered second team honors.

== Roster ==
1944–45 Iowa State Cyclones men's basketball team
Players
Coaches

| Pos. | # | Name | Height | Weight | Year | Hometown |
|---|---|---|---|---|---|---|
| C | | Bill Bailey | 6 ft 3 in (1.91 m) | — | | Winona, Minnesota |
| G | 30 | Bill Block (C) | 6 ft 0 in (1.83 m) | — | Sr | Muscatine, Iowa |
| G | | Ted Chamberlain | 6 ft 0 in (1.83 m) | — |
| C | | Sam Deal | 6 ft 1 in (1.85 m) | — | | Amarillo, Texas |
| F | 25 | Orlyn Feuerbach | 6 ft 1 in (1.85 m) | — | Sr | Keystone, Iowa |
| C | | Jim Harland | — | — | | Cedar Falls, Iowa |
| C | | Merl Kleen | 6 ft 2 in (1.88 m) | — | | Pomeroy, Iowa |
| | | Harry Kraus | — | — | | Sargent, Nebraska |
| | | Jack McDowell | — | — | | Harlan, Iowa |
| C | 24 | Bob Mott | — | — | Fr | Jewell, Iowa |
| F | 18 | Jim Myers | 5 ft 10 in (1.78 m) | — | Jr | Sioux City, Iowa |
| F | | Dana Omer | 6 ft 0 in (1.83 m) | — | | Spirit Lake, Iowa |
| F | | John Pflum | 5 ft 8 in (1.73 m) | — |
| G | | Bob Peterson | 5 ft 10 in (1.78 m) | — | Fr | Harlan, Iowa |
| G | | Gene Phelps | 5 ft 9 in (1.75 m) | — | | Wells, Minnesota |
| | | Rex Wagner | — | — | | Homer, Nebraska |

Head coach

- Louis Menze

Assistant coach(es)

Legend

- (C) Team captain
- (S) Suspended
- (I) Ineligible
- (W) Walk-on
- Injured
- Current redshirt

== Schedule and results ==
| Date time, TV | Rank^{#} | Opponent^{#} | Result | Record | Site city, state |
Regular season
| December 4, 1944*; 7:15 pm | | Minnesota | W 42–21 | 1–0 | State Gymnasium; Ames, Iowa |
| December 13, 1944* | | at Iowa Pre-Flight | L 39–49 | 1–1 | Iowa City, Iowa |
| December 16, 1944*; 8:15 pm | | at Drake; Iowa Big Four | L 45–52 | 1–2 | Drake Fieldhouse; Des Moines, Iowa |
| December 29, 1944* | | Iowa Pre-Flight | L 33–34 | 1–3 | State Gymnasium; Ames, Iowa |
| January 6, 1945; 7:30 pm | | Kansas State | W 60–31 | 2–3 (1–0) | State Gymnasium; Ames, Iowa |
| January 8, 1945 | | at Nebraska | W 50–38 | 3–3 (2–0) | Nebraska Coliseum; Lincoln, Nebraska |
| January 15, 1945*; 7:15 pm | | Ottumwa Naval | W 50–48 | 4–3 | State Gymnasium; Ames, Iowa |
| January 20, 1945 | | at Missouri | L 32–38 | 4–4 (2–1) | Brewer Fieldhouse; Columbia, Missouri |
| January 24, 1945*; 7:15 pm | | Drake; Iowa Big Four | W 57–32 | 5–4 | State Gymnasium; Ames, Iowa |
| January 27, 1945 | | at Kansas | L 35–50 | 5–5 (2–2) | Hoch Auditorium; Lawrence, Kansas |
| February 9, 1945 | | Missouri | W 58–30 | 6–5 (3–2) | State Gymnasium; Ames, Iowa |
| February 17, 1945 | | Oklahoma | W 51–43 | 7–5 (4–2) | State Gymnasium; Ames, Iowa |
| February 19, 1945 | | Nebraska | W 47–45 | 8–5 (5–2) | State Gymnasium; Ames, Iowa |
| February 24, 1945; 7:45 pm | | at Oklahoma | W 31–29 | 9–5 (6–2) | Municipal Auditorium; Oklahoma City, Oklahoma |
| February 26, 1945 | | at Kansas State | W 44–39 | 10–5 (7–2) | Nichols Hall; Manhattan, Kansas |
| March 2, 1945; 7:30 pm | | Kansas | W 61–39 | 11–5 (8–2) | State Gymnasium (3,500); Ames, Iowa |
*Non-conference game. ^{#}Rankings from AP poll. (#) Tournament seedings in parentheses. All times are in Central Time.
