= 1944–45 Illinois Fighting Illini men's basketball team =

American college basketball season

1944–45 Illinois Fighting Illini men's basketball
- Conference: Big Ten Conference
- Record: 13–7 (7–5 Big Ten)
- Head coach: Douglas R. Mills (9th season)
- Assistant coaches: Howie Braun (8th season); Wally Roettger (10th season)
- MVP: Walton Kirk
- Captain: Selected each game
- Home arena: Huff Hall

1944–45 Big Ten Conference men's basketball standings
	Conf.				Overall
Team	W		L	PCT	W		L	PCT
Iowa	11	–	1	.917	17	–	1	.944
Ohio State	10	–	2	.833	15	–	5	.750
Illinois	7	–	5	.583	13	–	7	.650
Purdue	6	–	6	.500	9	–	11	.450
Michigan	5	–	7	.417	12	–	7	.632
Wisconsin	4	–	8	.333	10	–	11	.476
Minnesota	4	–	8	.333	8	–	13	.381
Northwestern	4	–	8	.333	7	–	12	.368
Indiana	3	–	9	.250	10	–	11	.476
Chicago	0	–	0	–	7	–	8	.467

"1944-45 Fighting Illini men's basketball team"

The 1944–45 Illinois Fighting Illini men's basketball team represented the University of Illinois.

== Regular season ==
After the second worst season in Doug Mills tenure as the head coach of the Fighting Illini, the ongoing war created even more havoc with the 1944–45 season. The Illini were required to play games close to home which meant they played certain teams multiple times. For example, the team played Great Lakes three times, Chanute Field, in nearby Rantoul, Illinois, two times and George Mikan and the DePaul Blue Demons two times as well. As the season progressed, Mills experimented with several lineups, including a 19 player barrage versus Nebraska. These varied lineups allowed Mills to play an impressive freshman, Johnny Orr, playing his only season for Illinois prior to rejoining his high school coach, Dolph Stanley, at Beloit College in Beloit, Wisconsin.

The Big Ten Conference season was unusual as well. The Illini dropped their opening game to Michigan followed by a seven-game winning streak then concluding with four consecutive losses. The heaviest load fell on the hands of sophomores Walt Kirk and Howard Judson with freshman Walt Kersulis, Jack Burmaster, and Orr also being major contributors. Kirk would be named a Consensus All-American for his performance during the season.

The team completed their season with an overall record of 13 wins and 7 losses with a conference mark of 7 and 5 for a third-place finish. They finished with a 7 - 3 record at home and a road record of 5 - 4. The starting lineup consisted of Walton Kirk, Howard Judson, Johnny Orr, Jack Burmaster, Don Delaney and Walt Kersulis.

=== Roster ===
1944–45 Illinois Fighting Illini men's basketball team
Players
Coaches

Pos.	#	Name	Height	Weight	Year	Hometown
	3	Carl Bontemps	—	—	Fr	Taylorville, Illinois
C	7	Maurice Dolan	—	—	Jr	Champaign, Illinois
F	8	William Eddleman	6 ft 0 in (1.83 m)	—	Jr	Anna, Illinois
G	9	Jim Seyler	5 ft 11 in (1.8 m)	—	Jr	Champaign, Illinois
F/C	11	Johnny Orr	—	—	Fr	Taylorville, Illinois
G	12	Leo Gedvilas	6 ft 0 in (1.83 m)	—	So	Spring Valley, Illinois
C	14	John Larson	—	—	Jr	Sioux City, Iowa
G	15	Roger Little	—	—	Fr	Champaign, Illinois
F	18	Paul Schnackenberg	—	—	Fr	Chicago, Illinois
C	19	Walt Kersulis	—	—	Fr	East St. Louis, Illinois
F	20	Walter Mroz	5 ft 9 in (1.75 m)	—	Fr	Chicago, Illinois
F	21	Jake Staab	6 ft 2 in (1.88 m)	—	Jr	Chillicothe, Missouri
G	22	Lee Stickler	—	—	So	Alton, Illinois
F	23	Joe Sulenski	—	—	Fr	Chicago, Illinois
G	24	Vic Bubas	—	—	Fr	Gary, Indiana
G	25	Walt Kirk	—	—	Jr	Mt. Vernon, Illinois
F	26	Howard Judson	—	—	So	Hebron, Illinois
G	28	Gordon Hortin	—	—	Sr	Evansville, Indiana
C	31	Don Delaney	—	—	Jr	Sacramento, California
F	34	Bob Morton	—	—	So	Elgin, Illinois
G	38	Jack Burmaster	6 ft 2 in (1.88 m)	—	Fr	Elgin, Illinois

Head coach

- Douglas Mills (University of Illinois) (9th year)

Assistant coach(es)

- Wally Roettger (University of Illinois) (10th year)
- Howie Braun (University of Illinois) (8th year)

Legend

- (C) Team captain
- (S) Suspended
- (I) Ineligible
- (W) Walk-on
- Injured
- Current redshirt

Roster

== Schedule ==
Date time, TV	Rank^{#}	Opponent^{#}	Result	Record	Site (attendance) city, state
Non-Conference regular season
12/2/1944*		Chanute Field	W 64–25	1–0	Huff Hall (3,500); Champaign, IL
12/8/1944*		at Great Lakes	W 44–40	2–0	Chicago Stadium (9,845); Chicago, IL
12/9/1944*		at Great Lakes	W 56–53	3–0	Great Lakes Gymnasium (2,400); Great Lakes, IL
12/16/1944*		at DePaul	W 43–40	4–0	DePaul Auditorium (-); Chicago, IL
12/20/1944*		Great Lakes	L 45–52	4–1	Huff Hall (4,000); Champaign, IL
12/29/1944*		Nebraska	W 77–39	5–1	Huff Hall (2,500); Champaign, IL
1/1/1945*		DePaul	L 56–63	5–2	Huff Hall (4,158); Champaign, IL
Big Ten regular season
1/6/1945		Michigan	L 38–43	5–3 (0–1)	Huff Hall (4,200); Champaign, IL
1/13/1945		at Michigan	W 55–37	6–3 (1–1)	Yost Field House (4,000); Ann Arbor, MI
1/19/1945		Northwestern; Rivalry	W 51–42	7–3 (2–1)	Huff Hall (4,210); Champaign, IL
1/26/1945		Iowa; Rivalry	W 43–42	8–3 (3–1)	Huff Hall (6,000); Champaign, IL
2/6/1945*		at Chanute Field	W 58–46	9–3	Chanute Field (-); Rantoul, IL
2/10/1945		at Minnesota	W 50–32	10-3 (4–1)	Williams Arena (4,520); Minneapolis, MN
2/12/1945		Indiana; Rivalry	W 71–48	11–3 (5–1)	Huff Hall (4,620); Champaign, IL
2/16/1945		Ohio State	W 56-41	12–3 (6–1)	Huff Hall (7,100); Champaign, IL
2/19/1945		Minnesota	W 49–48	13–3 (7–1)	Huff Hall (4,657); Champaign, IL
2/23/1945		at Ohio State	L 44–60	13–4 (7–2)	Ohio Expo Center Coliseum (-); Columbus, OH
2/24/1945		at Northwestern; Rivalry	L 45–47	13–5 (7–3)	Chicago Stadium (15,862); Chicago, IL
2/28/1945		at Indiana; Rivalry	L 55–65	13–6 (7–4)	The Fieldhouse (3,500); Bloomington, IN
3/3/1945		at Iowa; Rivalry	L 37–43	13–7 (7–5)	Iowa Field House (14,400); Iowa City, IA
*Non-conference game. ^{#}Rankings from AP Poll. (#) Tournament seedings in parentheses. All times are in Central Time.

== Player stats ==
Player	Games played	Field goals	Free throws	Points
Walt Kirk	20	78	56	212
Howard Judson	20	73	24	170
Jack Burmaster	16	64	24	152
John Orr	20	51	18	120
Walt Kersulis	19	37	16	90
Don Delaney	19	30	23	83
Jimmy Seyler	20	29	16	74
Jake Staab	19	14	22	50
Robert Morton	14	17	7	41
Leo Gedvilas	12	11	3	25
Paul Schnackenberg	7	6	3	15
Joe Sulenski	3	2	0	4
Carl Bontemps	2	2	0	4
Vic Bubas	6	1	0	2
Jack Larson	1	1	0	2
Wallie Mroz	4	0	0	0
Gordon Hortin	5	0	0	0
William Eddleman	2	0	0	0
Maurice Dolan	1	0	0	0

== Awards and honors ==
- Johnny Orr
  - Big Ten Coach of the Year (1974) Michigan
  - National Coach of the Year (1976) Michigan
- Walt Kirk
  - Consensus First-Team All-American (1945)
  - Helms First-Team All-American (1945)
  - Argosy Magazine Second-Team All-American (1945)
  - Converse Honorable Mention All-American (1945)
  - Team Most Valuable Player
