= Gotkin =

Gotkin is a surname. Notable people with the surname include:

- Hy Gotkin (1922–2004), American basketball player
- Rick Gotkin (born 1959), American ice hockey player and coach
