= 1944–45 Kansas Jayhawks men's basketball team =

American college basketball season

1944–45 Kansas Jayhawks men's basketball
- Conference: Big Six Conference
- Record: 12–5 (7–3 Big 6)
- Head coach: Phog Allen (28th season)
- Captains: Gordon Reynolds; Kirk Scott
- Home arena: Hoch Auditorium

1944–45 Big Six Conference men's basketball standings
	Conf.				Overall
Team	W		L	PCT	W		L	PCT
Iowa State	8	–	2	.800	11	–	5	.688
Kansas	7	–	3	.700	12	–	5	.706
Oklahoma	5	–	5	.500	12	–	13	.480
Missouri	5	–	5	.500	12	–	13	.480
Kansas State	4	–	6	.400	10	–	13	.435
Nebraska	1	–	9	.100	2	–	17	.105

The 1944–45 Kansas Jayhawks men's basketball team represented the University of Kansas during the 1944–45 college men's basketball season.

== Roster ==
- Norman Carlson
- Herbert Helm
- Gordon Reynolds
- Owen Peck
- Dean Corder
- Charles Moffett
- Kirk Scott
- Louis Goehring
- Gustave Daum
- Edgar Williams
- Everett Hill

== Schedule ==
Date time, TV	Rank^{#}	Opponent^{#}	Result	Record	Site city, state
December 4*		at Washburn	L 35–40	0-1	Topeka, KS
December 8*		Washburn	W 31–27	1-1	Hoch Auditorium; Lawrence, KS
December 12*		at Rockhurst	W 47–28	2-1	Municipal Auditorium; Kansas City, MO
December 19*		Rockhurst	W 47–23	3-1	Hoch Auditorium; Lawrence, KS
December 22		vs. Kansas State; Border War	W 63–40	4-1	Municipal Auditorium; Kansas City, MO
December 23		vs. Missouri; Border War	L 39–48	4-2	Municipal Auditorium; Kansas City, MO
January 5		at Missouri; Border War	W 45–28	5-2 (1-0)	Brewer Fieldhouse; Columbia, MO
January 12		Nebraska	W 48–33	6-2 (2-0)	Hoch Auditorium; Lawrence, KS
January 20		at Oklahoma	L 43–44	6-3 (2-1)	Field House; Norman, OK
January 27		Iowa State	W 50–35	7-3 (3-1)	Hoch Auditorium; Lawrence, KS
January 30		Kansas State; Sunflower Showdown	W 39–36	8-3 (4-1)	Hoch Auditorium; Lawrence, KS
January 9		at Olathe NAB	W 41–26	9-3	Hoch Auditorium; Lawrence, KS
February 10		at Nebraska	L 45–59	9-4 (4-2)	Nebraska Coliseum; Lincoln, NE
February 13		Oklahoma	W 42–27	10-4 (5-2)	Hoch Auditorium; Lawrence, KS
February 16		at Kansas State; Sunflower Showdown	W 33–31	11-4 (6-2)	Nichols Hall; Manhattan, KS
February 24		Missouri; Border War	W 64–33	12-4 (7-2)	Hoch Auditorium; Lawrence, KS
March 3		at Iowa State	L 39–61	12-5 (7-3)	State Gymnasium; Ames, IA
*Non-conference game. ^{#}Rankings from AP Poll. (#) Tournament seedings in parentheses.
