= 1945 SEC men's basketball tournament =

- Classification: Division I
- Teams: 11
- Site: Jefferson County Armory; Louisville, Kentucky
- Champions: Kentucky (7th title)
- Winning coach: Adolph Rupp (7th title)

1944–45 Southeastern Conference men's basketball standings
	Conf.				Overall
Team	W		L	PCT	W		L	PCT
Tennessee	8	–	2	.800	18	–	5	.783
Kentucky †	4	–	1	.800	22	–	4	.846
Ole Miss	3	–	1	.750	15	–	8	.652
Florida	4	–	2	.667	7	–	12	.368
Georgia Tech	7	–	4	.636	11	–	6	.647
Alabama	5	–	3	.625	10	–	5	.667
LSU	3	–	3	.500	15	–	9	.625
Tulane	3	–	3	.500	8	–	11	.421
Auburn	2	–	6	.250	3	–	14	.176
Mississippi State	2	–	9	.182	5	–	13	.278
Georgia	2	–	9	.182	5	–	16	.238
Vanderbilt		–		–	6	–	6	.500
† Regular-season championship and SEC Tournament winner

The 1945 Southeastern Conference men's basketball tournament took place on February 28–March 3, 1945, in Louisville, Kentucky at the Jefferson County Armory. It was the twelfth SEC basketball tournament.

Kentucky won the tournament by beating Tennessee in the championship game. The Wildcats went on to play in the 1945 NCAA Tournament, losing to Ohio State in the first round, and the Volunteers went on to play in the 1945 National Invitation Tournament, losing in the first round to Rhode Island.

== Bracket ==
First Round
Georgia Tech	68
Georgia	49
Tennessee	59
Ole Miss	37
Kentucky	57
Florida	35

Quarterfinals
Mississippi State	43
Georgia Tech	60
Auburn	24
Tennessee	56
Alabama	51
Tulane	31
LSU	37
Kentucky	68

Semifinals
Georgia Tech	37
Tennessee	41
Alabama	41
Kentucky	52

Finals
Tennessee	35
Kentucky	39
