= 1944–45 Cincinnati Bearcats men's basketball team =

American college basketball season

1944–45 Cincinnati Bearcats men's basketball
- Conference: Independent
- Record: 8–9
- Head coach: Ray Farnham (1st season)
- Captain: John Mueller
- Home arena: Schmidlapp Gymnasium

The 1944–45 Cincinnati Bearcats men's basketball team represented the University of Cincinnati during the 1944–45 NCAA men's basketball season. The head coach was Ray Farnham, coaching his first season with the Bearcats. The team finished with an overall record of 8–9.

== Schedule ==
Date time, TV	Opponent	Result	Record	Site city, state
December 1	Morehead (KY)	L 24–35	0–1	Schmidlapp Gymnasium; Cincinnati, OH
December 9	at Kentucky	L 24–66	0–2	Alumni Gymnasium; Lexington, KY
December 16	Wilmington	W 66–21	1–2	Schmidlapp Gymnasium; Cincinnati, OH
December 22	Cincinnati Ferry Com.	W 64–42	2–2	Schmidlapp Gymnasium; Cincinnati, OH
January 5	at Wayne (MI)	L 39–49	2–3	
January 6	at Michigan State	W 39–37	3–3	Jenison Fieldhouse; East Lansing, MI
January 12	Michigan State	W 54–50	4–3	Schmidlapp Gymnasium; Cincinnati, OH
January 15	at Marshall	L 37–75	4–4	Huntington, WV
January 19	Ohio	L 36–61	4–5	Schmidlapp Gymnasium; Cincinnati, OH
January 25	at Wilmington	W 52–40	5–5	Wilmington, OH
February 3	Marshall	W 36–34	6–5	Schmidlapp Gymnasium; Cincinnati, OH
February 7	at Miami (OH)	L 36–55	6–6	Withrow Court; Oxford, OH
February 10	at Ohio	L 40–48	6–7	Men's Gymnasium; Athens, OH
February 15	Miami (OH)	W 45–40	7–7	Schmidlapp Gymnasium; Cincinnati, OH
February 17	at Akron	L 38–66	7–8	Akron Armory; Akron, OH
February 20	Wayne (MI)	W 57–40	8–8	Schmidlapp Gymnasium; Cincinnati, OH
February 24	Wright Field	L 35–65	8–9	Schmidlapp Gymnasium; Cincinnati, OH
*Non-conference game. (#) Tournament seedings in parentheses.
