= Dick Smuin =

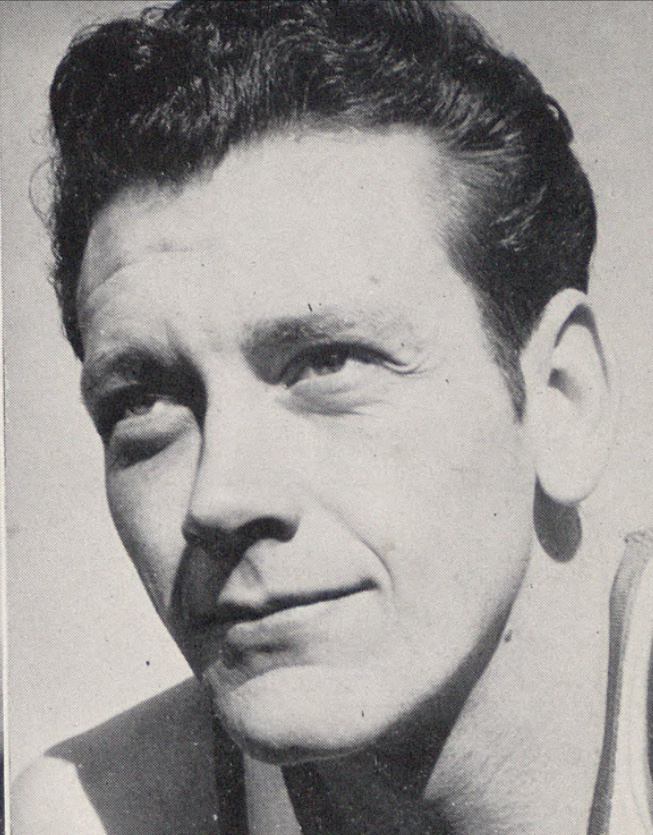
- Smuin from the 1948 Utonian

Personal information
- Born: November 14, 1925
- Died: September 25, 2001 (aged 75)

Career information
- High school: Cyprus (Magna, Utah)
- College: Utah (1943–1944, 1946–1949)
- Playing career: 1950–1951
- Position: Forward

Career history
- 1950–1951: Utica Pros

Career highlights
- NCAA champion (1944)

Richard L. Smuin (November 14, 1925 – September 25, 2001) was an American basketball player. He was a starter on the University of Utah's 1944 NCAA championship team and a professional in the American Basketball League (an early challenger to the NBA).

Smuin came to the Utah Utes from Cyprus High School in Magna, Utah in 1943 at a time when NCAA freshman eligibility standards were relaxed to allow schools to field teams while many college-aged men were fighting in World War II. Smuin, a forward who honed his defensive stance chasing chickens on his family's Utah farm, teamed with fellow freshmen Arnie Ferrin, Wat Misaka and Herb Wilkinson to bring Utah its first NCAA championship in 1944.

After a two-year hitch in the U. S. Navy, Smuin returned to the University of Utah for the 1946–47 season, helping the Utes to the 1947 National Invitation Tournament championship. He finished his career following the conclusion of the 1948–49 season.

Following his college career, Smuin played one season in the American Basketball League for the Utica Pros, averaging 10.0 points per game. He then became a high school coach and teacher and his alma mater, Cyprus High School, as well as Granger High School and Cottonwood High School.

Dick Smuin died September 25, 2001
