= 1944–45 Washington State Cougars men's basketball team =

American college basketball season

1944–45 Washington State Cougars men's basketball
- Conference: Pacific Coast Conference
- Record: 23–13 (11–5 PCC)
- Head coach: Jack Friel (17th season)
- Home arena: WSC Gymnasium

1944–45 Pacific Coast Conference men's basketball standings
| | Conf. | | | | Overall |
| Team | W | | L | PCT | W | | L | PCT |
|---|---|---|---|---|---|---|---|---|
North
| Oregon † | 11 | – | 5 | .688 | 30 | – | 15 | .667 |
| Washington State | 11 | – | 5 | .688 | 23 | – | 13 | .639 |
| Oregon State | 10 | – | 6 | .625 | 20 | – | 8 | .714 |
| Washington | 5 | – | 11 | .313 | 22 | – | 18 | .550 |
| Idaho | 3 | – | 13 | .188 | 13 | – | 20 | .394 |
South
| UCLA | 3 | – | 1 | .750 | 12 | – | 12 | .500 |
| USC | 2 | – | 2 | .500 | 15 | – | 9 | .625 |
| California | 1 | – | 3 | .250 | 7 | – | 8 | .467 |
† North division playoff series and conference playoff series winner

The 1944–45 Washington State Cougars men's basketball team represented Washington State College for the 1944–45 college basketball season. Led by seventeenth-year head coach Jack Friel, the Cougars were members of the Pacific Coast Conference and played their home games on campus at the WSC Gymnasium in Pullman, Washington.

The Cougars were 22–11 overall in the regular season and 11–5 in conference play, tied for first in the Northern division.

In the best-of-three playoff series with Oregon, the road teams won the first two games, which were played six nights apart. In the deciding third game in Eugene the next night, the home team rallied from a six-point deficit at halftime to win by a basket; Oregon advanced to the eight-team NCAA tournament, but lost their opener by three points.

== Postseason results ==
| Date time, TV | Opponent | Result | Record | Site (attendance) city, state |
Pacific Coast Conference Northern Division Playoff Series
| Sat, March 10; 8:00 pm | Oregon; Game One | L 41–51 | 22–12 | WSC Gymnasium; Pullman, Washington |
| Fri, March 16; 8:00 pm | at Oregon; Game Two | W 53–48 | 23–12 | McArthur Court (7,000); Eugene, Oregon |
| Sat, March 17; 8:00 pm | at Oregon; Game Three | L 37–39 | 23–13 | McArthur Court (6,000); Eugene, Oregon |
*Non-conference game. ^{#}Rankings from AP Poll. (#) Tournament seedings in parentheses. All times are in Pacific time.
