= 1944–45 Wisconsin Badgers men's basketball team =

American college basketball season

1944–45 Wisconsin Badgers men's basketball
- Conference: Big Ten Conference
- Record: 10–11 (4–8 Big Ten)
- Head coach: Harold E. Foster
- Home arena: UW Fieldhouse

1944–45 Big Ten Conference men's basketball standings
	Conf.				Overall
Team	W		L	PCT	W		L	PCT
Iowa	11	–	1	.917	17	–	1	.944
Ohio State	10	–	2	.833	15	–	5	.750
Illinois	7	–	5	.583	13	–	7	.650
Purdue	6	–	6	.500	9	–	11	.450
Michigan	5	–	7	.417	12	–	7	.632
Wisconsin	4	–	8	.333	10	–	11	.476
Minnesota	4	–	8	.333	8	–	13	.381
Northwestern	4	–	8	.333	7	–	12	.368
Indiana	3	–	9	.250	10	–	11	.476
Chicago	0	–	0	–	7	–	8	.467

The 1944–45 Wisconsin Badgers men's basketball team represented University of Wisconsin–Madison. The head coach was Harold E. Foster, coaching his eleventh season with the Badgers. The team played their home games at the UW Fieldhouse in Madison, Wisconsin and was a member of the Big Ten Conference.

== Schedule ==
Date time, TV	Rank^{#}	Opponent^{#}	Result	Record	Site city, state
Regular Season
12/02/1944*		Lawrence (WI)	W 48–22	1–0	UW Fieldhouse; Madison, Wisconsin
12/09/1944*		Marquette	W 45–40	2–0	UW Fieldhouse; Madison, Wisconsin
12/16/1944*		Notre Dame	L 46–57	2–1	UW Fieldhouse; Madison, Wisconsin
12/20/1944*		Iowa Pre-Flight	W 51–43	3–1	UW Fieldhouse; Madison, Wisconsin
12/23/1944*		at Marquette	W 46–39	4–1	Marquette Gymnasium; Milwaukee
12/30/1944*		vs. Missouri	W 52–37	5–1	Marquette Gymnasium; Milwaukee
1/06/1945		Northwestern	L 37–52	5–2 (0–1)	UW Fieldhouse; Madison, Wisconsin
1/08/1945*		at Truax Field	W 53–42	6–2	Madison, Wisconsin
1/13/1945		Minnesota	W 46–37	7–2 (1–1)	UW Fieldhouse; Madison, Wisconsin
1/22/1945*		Great Lakes (IL)	L 51–66	7–3	UW Fieldhouse; Madison, Wisconsin
1/27/1945		vs. Northwestern	W 44–43	8–3 (2–1)	Chicago Stadium; Chicago
1/29/1945		at Purdue	L 34–45	8–4 (2–2)	Purdue Fieldhouse; West Lafayette, Indiana
2/02/1945		at Michigan	L 39–50	8–5 (2–3)	Yost Field House; Ann Arbor, Michigan
2/03/1945		at Ohio State	L 36–40	8–6 (2–4)	Ohio Expo Center Coliseum; Columbus, Ohio
2/04/1945*		at Great Lakes (IL)	L 49–59	8–7	Waukegan, Illinois
2/09/1945		Ohio State	L 34–63	8–8 (2–5)	UW Fieldhouse; Madison, Wisconsin
2/10/1945		Michigan	W 55–44	9–8 (3–5)	UW Fieldhouse; Madison, Wisconsin
2/17/1945		Purdue	W 64–48	10–8 (4–5)	UW Fieldhouse; Madison, Wisconsin
2/19/1945		at Iowa	L 53–54	10–9 (4–6)	Iowa Field House; Iowa City, IA
2/24/1945		Iowa	L 38–68	10–10 (4–7)	UW Fieldhouse; Madison, Wisconsin
3/03/1945		at Minnesota	L 50–54	10–11 (4–8)	Minnesota Field House; Minneapolis
*Non-conference game. ^{#}Rankings from AP Poll. (#) Tournament seedings in parentheses.
