= 1944–45 Ohio State Buckeyes men's basketball team =

American college basketball season

1944–45 Ohio State Buckeyes men's basketball
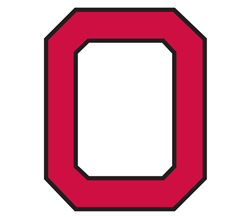

NCAA tournament, Final Four
- Conference: Big Ten Conference
- Record: 15–5 (10–2 Big Ten)
- Head coach: Harold Olsen (23rd season)
- Assistant coach: J. E. Blickle
- Home arena: Fairgrounds Coliseum

1944–45 Big Ten Conference men's basketball standings
	Conf.				Overall
Team	W		L	PCT	W		L	PCT
Iowa	11	–	1	.917	17	–	1	.944
Ohio State	10	–	2	.833	15	–	5	.750
Illinois	7	–	5	.583	13	–	7	.650
Purdue	6	–	6	.500	9	–	11	.450
Michigan	5	–	7	.417	12	–	7	.632
Wisconsin	4	–	8	.333	10	–	11	.476
Minnesota	4	–	8	.333	8	–	13	.381
Northwestern	4	–	8	.333	7	–	12	.368
Indiana	3	–	9	.250	10	–	11	.476
Chicago	0	–	0	–	7	–	8	.467

The 1944–45 Ohio State Buckeyes men's basketball team represented Ohio State University as a member of the Big Ten Conference during the 1944–45 NCAA men's basketball season. The team's head coach was Harold Olsen and they played their home games at the Fairgrounds Coliseum. Ohio State finished second to Iowa in Big Ten play with a 10–2 record. The Buckeyes were one of eight teams selected to play in the NCAA tournament where they reached the Final Four for the third time in program history before losing to NYU in the East regional final.

== Roster ==
1944–45 Ohio State Buckeyes men's basketball team
Players	Coaches
Pos. / # / Name / Height / Weight / Year / Hometown	Head coach: Harold Olsen (Wisconsin); Assistant coach(es) Legend: (C) Team captain; (S) Suspended; (I) Ineligible; (W) Walk-on; Injured; Current redshirt

== Schedule and results ==
Date time, TV	Opponent	Result	Record	Site city, state
Regular season
Dec 9, 1944*	Michigan State	W 58–31	1–0	Fairgrounds Coliseum; Columbus, Ohio
Dec 18, 1944*	Utah	W 64–36	2–0	Fairgrounds Coliseum; Columbus, Ohio
Dec 23, 1944*	at Kentucky	L 48–53 ^{OT}	3–0	Alumni Gymnasium; Lexington, Kentucky
Feb 16, 1945	at Illinois	L 41–56	11–4 (7–2)	Huff Hall (6,000); Champaign, Illinois
Feb 17, 1945	at Indiana	W 63–45	12–4 (8–2)	The Fieldhouse; Bloomington, Indiana
Feb 23, 1945	Illinois	W 60–44	13–4 (9–2)	Fairgrounds Coliseum; Columbus, Ohio
Feb 24, 1945	Indiana	W 85–52	14–4 (10–2)	Fairgrounds Coliseum; Columbus, Ohio
NCAA tournament
Mar 22, 1945*	vs. Kentucky; National Quarterfinal – Elite Eight	W 45–37	15–4	Madison Square Garden; New York, New York
Mar 24, 1945*	vs. NYU; National Semifinal – Final Four	L 65–70 ^{OT}	15–5	Madison Square Garden; New York, New York
*Non-conference game. ^{#}Rankings from AP Poll. (#) Tournament seedings in parentheses. E=East.
