= Harry C. Adams =

American basketball coach (1915–2011)

Harry Charles Adams (July 20, 1915 – November 4, 2011) was an American college men's basketball coach. He was the head coach of Kent State, whom he led to a 28–16 record over two seasons from 1946 to 1948. He also served as an assistant on Kent State's football team.
