= 1944–45 Indiana Hoosiers men's basketball team =

American college basketball season

1944–45 Indiana Hoosiers men's basketball
- Conference: Big Ten Conference
- Record: 10–11 (3–9 Big Ten)
- Head coach: Harry Good (2nd season)
- Home arena: The Fieldhouse

1944–45 Big Ten Conference men's basketball standings
	Conf.				Overall
Team	W		L	PCT	W		L	PCT
Iowa	11	–	1	.917	17	–	1	.944
Ohio State	10	–	2	.833	15	–	5	.750
Illinois	7	–	5	.583	13	–	7	.650
Purdue	6	–	6	.500	9	–	11	.450
Michigan	5	–	7	.417	12	–	7	.632
Wisconsin	4	–	8	.333	10	–	11	.476
Minnesota	4	–	8	.333	8	–	13	.381
Northwestern	4	–	8	.333	7	–	12	.368
Indiana	3	–	9	.250	10	–	11	.476
Chicago	0	–	0	–	7	–	8	.467

The 1944–45 Indiana Hoosiers men's basketball team represented Indiana University. Their head coach was Harry Good, who was in his second year. The team played its home games in The Fieldhouse in Bloomington, Indiana, and was a member of the Big Ten Conference.

The Hoosiers finished the regular season with an overall record of 10–11 and a conference record of 3–9, finishing 9th in the Big Ten Conference. Indiana was not invited to participate in any postseason tournament.

== Roster ==
No.	Name	Position	Ht.	Year	Hometown
4	Gene Farris	F	6–3	So.	Campbellsburg, Indiana
5	Charles Radcliffe	F	5–10	Jr.	Paoli, Indiana
5	Ed Schienbein	G	5–9	Sr.	Southport, Indiana
6	George Cherry	G	5–11	Fr.	Greensburg, Indiana
7	Gene Johnson	C	6–3	Fr.	Hartford City, Indiana
8	Dave Etchison	F	6–1	Fr.	Alexandria, Indiana
9	Jack Herron	G	5–8	Jr.	Logansport, Indiana
10	Robert Goodman	F	6–1	Fr.	Paterson, New Jersey
11	Jack Mercer	G	6–1	So.	Brazil, Indiana
12	Norbert Hermann	G	6–2	Fr.	Brownstown, Indiana
14	Marion Fine	G	5–6	So.	Indianapolis, Indiana
15	Ray Brandenburg	G	5–10	So.	Corydon, Indiana
16	Louis Teats	G	5–6	Fr.	Aurora, Indiana
17	George Laughery	F	6–1	Fr.	Robinson, Illinois
18	Charles Leedke	G	5–10	Fr.	Connersville, Indiana
21	Dean Daniels	F	5–11	Fr.	South Bend, Indiana
22	James Copeland	F	6–2	Fr.	Elwood, Indiana
22	Dick Schnieder	G	5–11	Fr.	LaPorte, Indiana
23	Freeland Armstrong	G	5–11	Fr.	Paoli, Indiana
24	Zygmund Belsowski	G	5–11	Fr.	LaPorte, Indiana
25	George Milan	G	5–11	Fr.	East Chicago, Indiana
27	Gene Turner	G	5–11	Fr.	Kokomo, Indiana
29	Ed Murray	F	5–10	Fr.	Cincinnati
35	Al Kravolansky	F/C	6–3	So.	East Chicago, Indiana
39	Del Russell	F	6–1	So.	Park Ridge, Illinois
40	Milton Mink	C	6–5	Fr.	Rochester, Indiana
41	Ted Kluszewski	F	6–2	Fr.	Argo, Illinois
45	John Roper	C	6–5	Fr.	Campbell, Ohio

== Schedule/results ==
Date time, TV	Rank^{#}	Opponent^{#}	Result	Record	Site city, state
Regular season
11/30/1944*		at Wabash	W 43–39	1–0	Crawfordsville, Indiana
12/2/1944*		Camp Atterbury	W 44–22	2–0	The Fieldhouse; Bloomington, Indiana
12/5/1944*		DePauw	L 50–51	2–1	The Fieldhouse; Bloomington, Indiana
12/9/1944*		at Camp Atterbury	W 63–48	3–1	Camp Atterbury, Indiana
12/14/1944*		Wabash	W 55–39	4–1	The Fieldhouse; Bloomington, Indiana
12/16/1944*		vs. Kentucky; Indiana–Kentucky rivalry	L 43–61	4–2	Jefferson County Armory; Louisville, Kentucky
12/30/1944*		Nebraska	W 65–42	5–2	The Fieldhouse; Bloomington, Indiana
1/2/1945*		Pentathlon of Mexico	W 53–33	6–2	The Fieldhouse; Bloomington, Indiana
1/6/1945		at Michigan	L 53–54	6–3 (0–1)	Yost Field House; Ann Arbor, Michigan
1/9/1945*		at DePauw	W 58–38	7–3 (0–1)	Bowman Gym; Greencastle, Indiana
1/17/1945		Purdue; Rivalry	W 51–50	8–3 (1–1)	The Fieldhouse; Bloomington, Indiana
1/20/1945		at Minnesota	W 48–46	9–3 (2–1)	Minnesota Field House; Minneapolis
1/22/1945		at Iowa	L 51–56	9–4 (2–2)	Iowa Field House; Iowa City, IA
1/27/1945		Michigan	L 43–47	9–5 (2–3)	The Fieldhouse; Bloomington, Indiana
2/5/1945		Minnesota	L 48–56	9–6 (2–4)	The Fieldhouse; Bloomington, Indiana
2/7/1945		at Purdue; Rivalry	L 48–62	9–7 (2–5)	Lambert Fieldhouse; West Lafayette, Indiana
2/10/1945		Iowa	L 40–45	9–8 (2–6)	The Fieldhouse; Bloomington, Indiana
2/12/1945		at Illinois; Rivalry	L 48–71	9–9 (2–7)	Huff Hall; Champaign, Illinois
2/17/1945		Ohio State	L 45–63	9–10 (2–8)	The Fieldhouse; Bloomington, Indiana
2/24/1945		at Ohio State	L 52–85	9–11 (2–9)	Ohio Expo Center Coliseum; Columbus, Ohio
2/28/1945		Illinois; Rivalry	W 65–55	10–11 (3–9)	The Fieldhouse; Bloomington, Indiana
*Non-conference game. ^{#}Rankings from AP Poll. (#) Tournament seedings in parentheses.
