= 1944–45 Idaho Vandals men's basketball team =

American college basketball season

1944–45 Idaho Vandals men's basketball
- Conference: Pacific Coast Conference
- Record: 13–20 (3–13 PCC)
- Head coach: James "Babe" Brown (3rd season)
- Home arena: Memorial Gymnasium

1944–45 Pacific Coast Conference men's basketball standings
	Conf.				Overall
Team	W		L	PCT	W		L	PCT
North
Oregon †	11	–	5	.688	30	–	15	.667
Washington State	11	–	5	.688	23	–	13	.639
Oregon State	10	–	6	.625	20	–	8	.714
Washington	5	–	11	.313	22	–	18	.550
Idaho	3	–	13	.188	13	–	20	.394
South
UCLA	3	–	1	.750	12	–	12	.500
USC	2	–	2	.500	15	–	9	.625
California	1	–	3	.250	7	–	8	.467
† North division playoff series and conference playoff series winner

The 1944–45 Idaho Vandals men's basketball team represented the University of Idaho during the 1944–45 NCAA college basketball season. Members of the Pacific Coast Conference, the Vandals were led by third-year acting head coach James "Babe" Brown and played their home games on campus at Memorial Gymnasium in Moscow, Idaho.

The Vandals were 13–20 overall in the regular season and 3–13 in conference play.
