= 1944–45 Washington Huskies men's basketball team =

American college basketball season

1944–45 Washington Huskies men's basketball
- Conference: Pacific Coast Conference
- Record: 22–18 (5–11 PCC)
- Head coach: Hec Edmundson (25th season)
- Captain: Bill Vandenburgh
- Home arena: UW Pavilion

1944–45 Pacific Coast Conference men's basketball standings
	Conf.				Overall
Team	W		L	PCT	W		L	PCT
North
Oregon †	11	–	5	.688	30	–	15	.667
Washington State	11	–	5	.688	23	–	13	.639
Oregon State	10	–	6	.625	20	–	8	.714
Washington	5	–	11	.313	22	–	18	.550
Idaho	3	–	13	.188	13	–	20	.394
South
UCLA	3	–	1	.750	12	–	12	.500
USC	2	–	2	.500	15	–	9	.625
California	1	–	3	.250	7	–	8	.467
† North division playoff series and conference playoff series winner

The 1944–45 Washington Huskies men's basketball team represented the University of Washington for the 1944–45 NCAA college basketball season. Led by 25th-year head coach Hec Edmundson, the Huskies were members of the Pacific Coast Conference and played their home games on campus at the UW Pavilion in Seattle, Washington.

The Huskies were 22–18 overall in the regular season and 5–11 in conference play; fourth in the Northern division.
