= 1944–45 Michigan Wolverines men's basketball team =

American college basketball season

1944–45 Michigan Wolverines men's basketball
- Conference: Big Ten Conference
- Record: 12–7 (5–7 Big Ten)
- Head coach: Bennie Oosterbaan
- Captain: Don Lundquist
- Home arena: Yost Field House

1944–45 Big Ten Conference men's basketball standings
	Conf.				Overall
Team	W		L	PCT	W		L	PCT
Iowa	11	–	1	.917	17	–	1	.944
Ohio State	10	–	2	.833	15	–	5	.750
Illinois	7	–	5	.583	13	–	7	.650
Purdue	6	–	6	.500	9	–	11	.450
Michigan	5	–	7	.417	12	–	7	.632
Wisconsin	4	–	8	.333	10	–	11	.476
Minnesota	4	–	8	.333	8	–	13	.381
Northwestern	4	–	8	.333	7	–	12	.368
Indiana	3	–	9	.250	10	–	11	.476
Chicago	0	–	0	–	7	–	8	.467

The 1944–45 Michigan Wolverines men's basketball team represented the University of Michigan in intercollegiate basketball during the 1944–45 season. The team finished the season in fifth place in the Big Ten Conference with an overall record of 12–7 and 5–7 against conference opponents.

Bennie Oosterbaan was in his seventh year as the team's head coach. Robert Geahan was the team's leading scorer with 136 points in 19 games for an average of 7.2 points per game. Don Lundquist was the team captain.

== Statistical leaders ==
Player	Pos.	Yr	G	FG	FT	RB	Pts	PPG
Robert Geahan			19	56	24		136	7.2
Walter Kell			19	47	28		122	6.4
John Mullaney			19	46	29		121	6.4
Keith Harder			17	51	12		114	6.7
Donald Lindquist			19	45	18		108	5.7
Don Lund			17	36	25		97	5.7
Totals			19	327	161		815	42.9
