= 1944–45 Holy Cross Crusaders men's basketball team =

American college basketball season

1944–45 Holy Cross Crusaders men's basketball
- Conference: Independent
- Record: 4–9
- Head coach: Hop Riopel (3rd season)
- Captain: Robert Hogarty
- Home arena: N/A

The 1944–45 Holy Cross Crusaders men's basketball team represented The College of the Holy Cross during the 1944–45 NCAA men's basketball season. The head coach was Hop Riopel, coaching the crusaders in his third season. The team finished with an overall record of 4–9.

== Schedule ==
Date time, TV	Opponent	Result	Record	Site city, state
12/09/1944*	at Temple	L 38–54	0–1	Temple Stadium; Philadelphia, PA
12/16/1944*	at Cushing Hospital	L 41–57	0–2	Ashburnham, MA
12/23/1944*	vs. DePauw	W 41–35	1–2	Boston Garden; Boston, MA
1/06/1945*	at Brown	L 62–77	1–3	Marvel Gymnasium; Providence, RI
1/13/1945*	at St. Francis	W 57–51	2–3	Medford, MA
1/20/1945*	at Yale	L 51–59	2–4	Payne Whitney Gymnasium; New Haven, CT
1/25/1945*	vs. Valparaiso	L 51–64	2–5	Boston Garden; Boston, MA
1/27/1945*	at Harvard	W 61–36	3–5	Malkin Athletic Center; Boston, MA
1/31/1945*	Worcester Tech	W 64–47	4–5	Worcester, MA
2/03/1945*	at Dartmouth	L 46–59	4–6	Alumni Gym; Hanover, NH
2/08/1945*	vs. St. Francis	L 48–52	4–7	Boston Garden; Boston, MA
2/10/1945*	at Trinity	L 54–55 ^{ot}	4–8	Hartford, CT
2/17/1945*	at Rensselaer	L 45–73	4–9	Troy, NY
*Non-conference game. (#) Tournament seedings in parentheses.
