= 1945 NCAA Men's Basketball All-Americans =

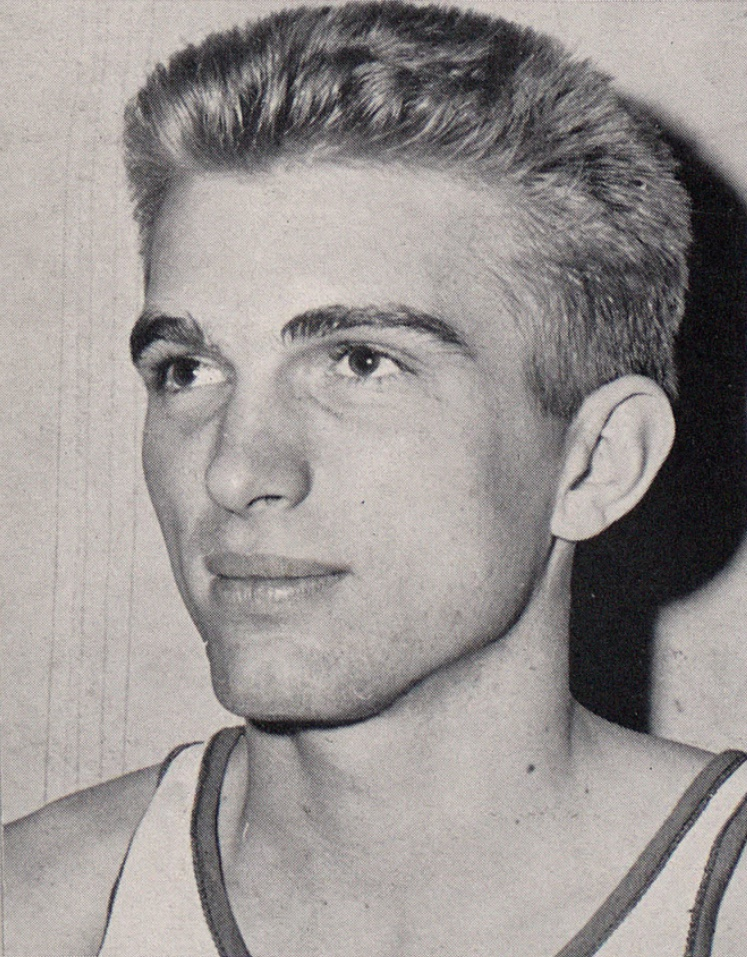
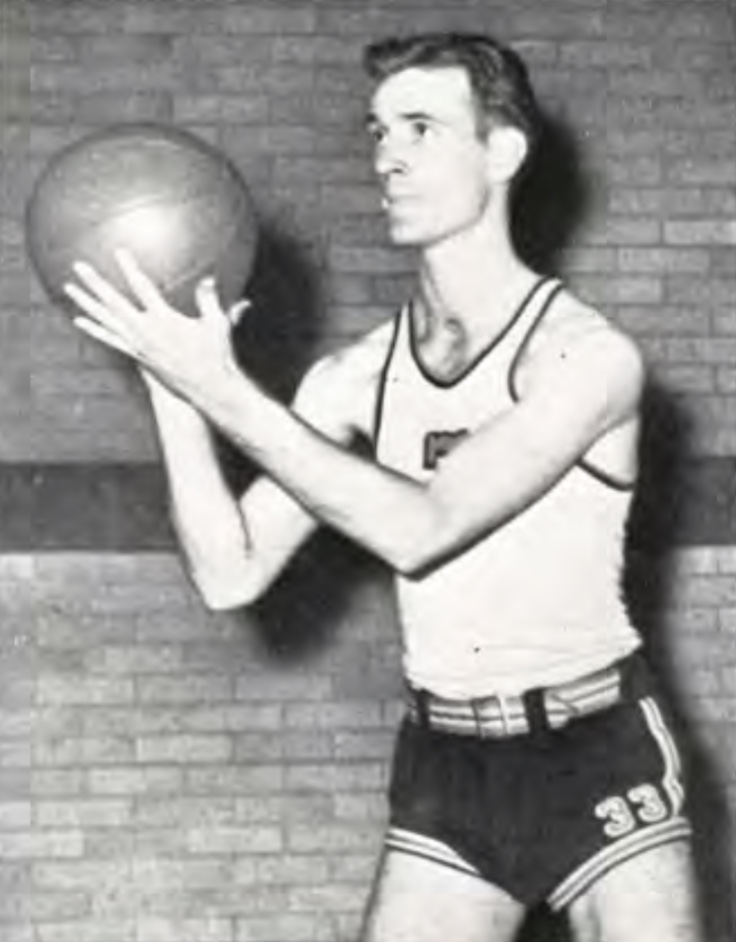
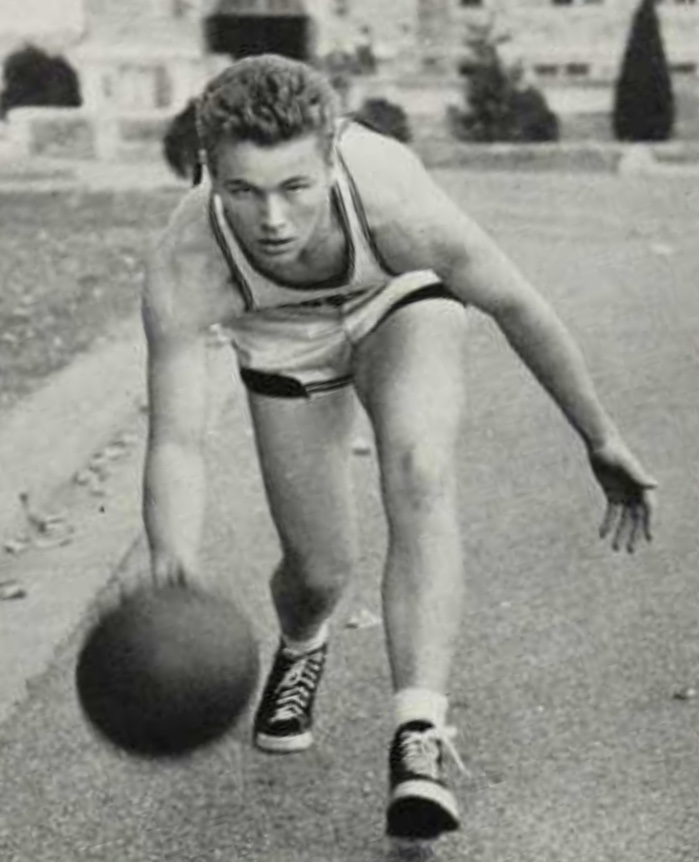
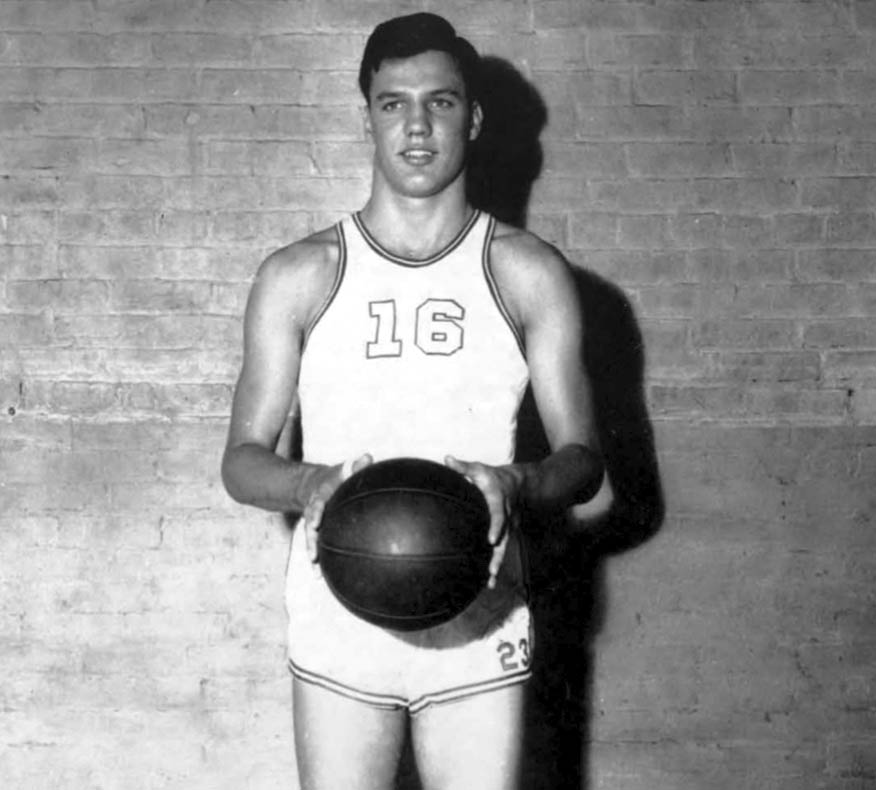
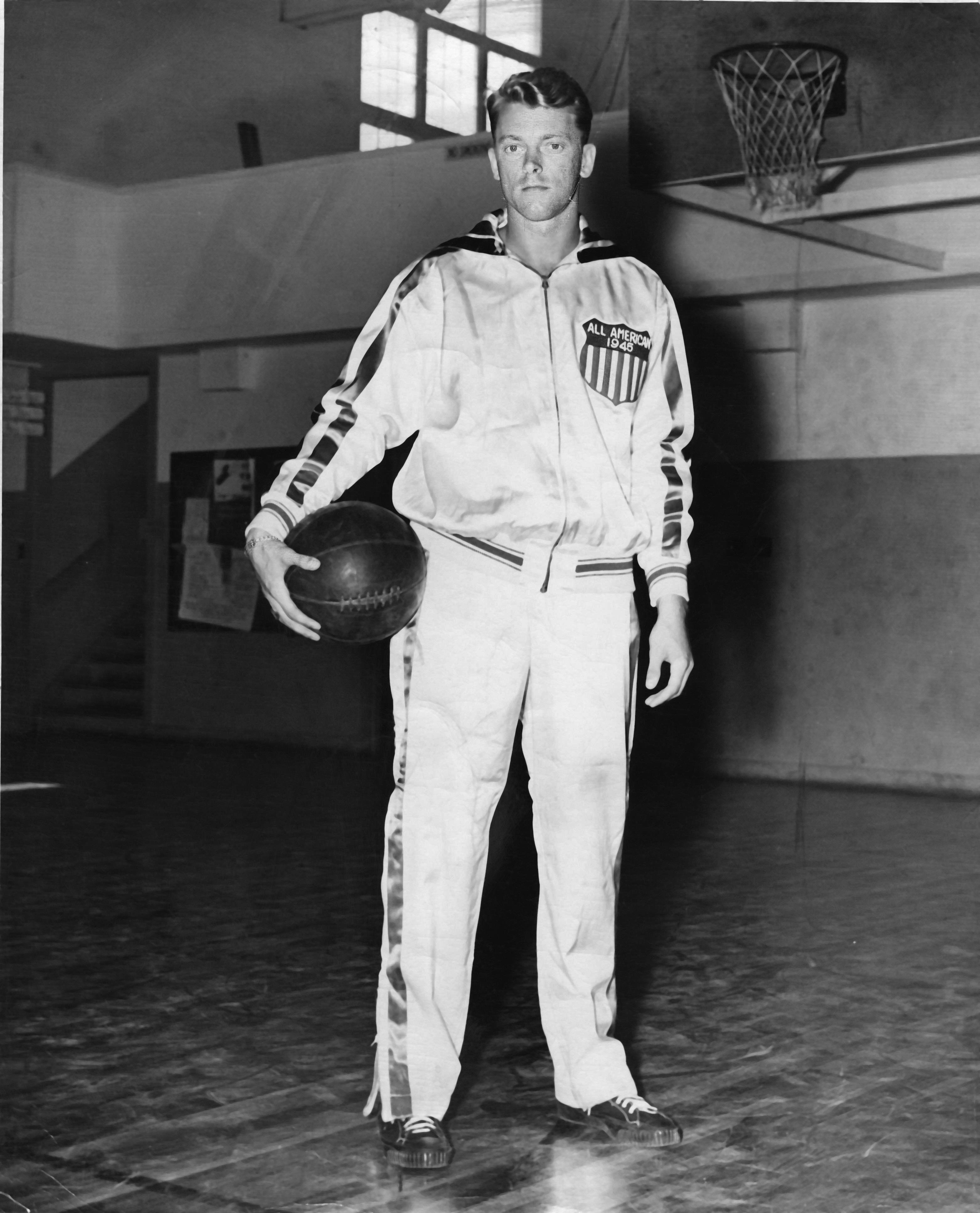
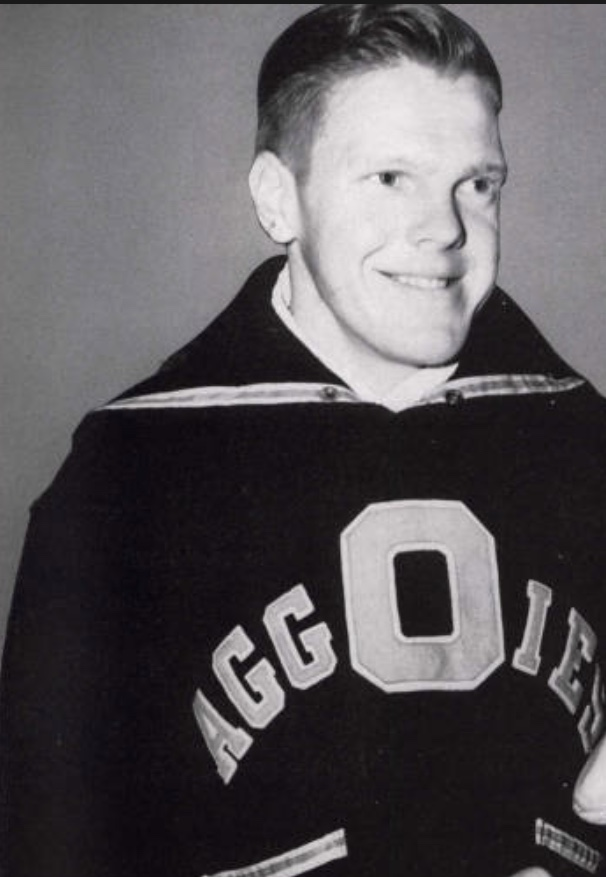
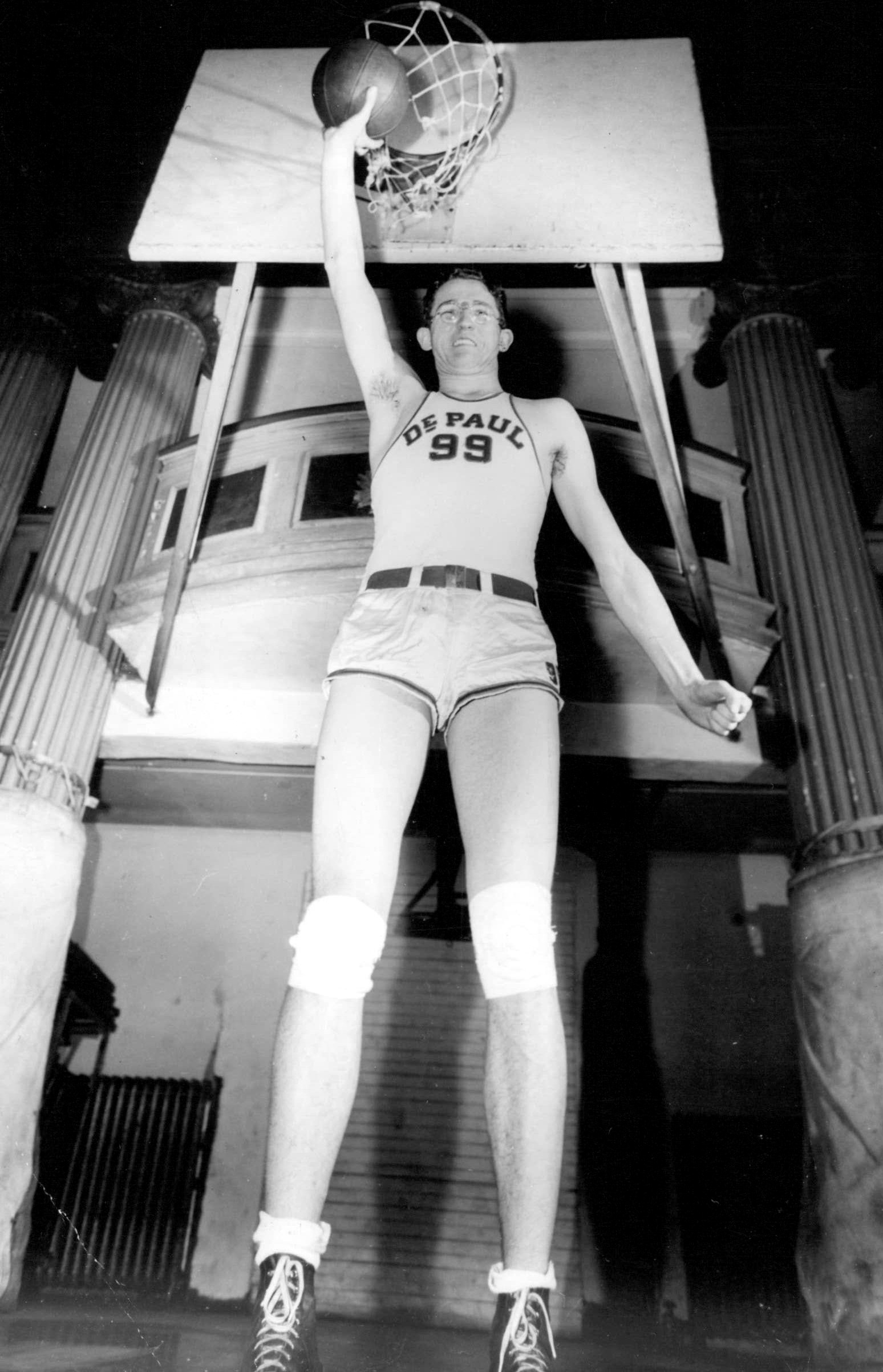
- Members of the 1945 consensus first team. Clockwise from top left: Ferrin, Gray, Hassett, Henry, Mikan, Kurland, Kirk.
- Awarded for: 1944–45 NCAA men's basketball season

The consensus 1945 College Basketball All-American team, as determined by aggregating the results of four major All-American teams. To earn "consensus" status, a player must win honors from a majority of the following teams: the Helms Athletic Foundation, Converse, The Sporting News, and Argosy Magazine.

== 1945 Consensus All-America team ==
Consensus First Team
Player	Position	Class	Team
Arnie Ferrin	F	Sophomore	Utah
Wyndol Gray	F	Junior	Bowling Green
Billy Hassett	G	Junior	Notre Dame
Bill Henry	C	Senior	Rice
Walt Kirk	G/F	Junior	Illinois
Bob Kurland	C	Junior	Oklahoma A&M
George Mikan	C	Junior	DePaul

Consensus Second Team
Player	Position	Class	Team
Howie Dallmar	F	Junior	Pennsylvania
Don Grate	G	Senior	Ohio State
Dale Hall	F	Senior	Army
Vince Hanson	C	Sophomore	Washington State
Dick Ives	F	Sophomore	Iowa
Max Morris	F	Senior	Northwestern
Herb Wilkinson	G	Sophomore	Iowa

== Individual All-America teams ==
All-America Team
All-America Team	First team		Second team		Third team	
All-America Team	Player	School	Player	School	Player	School
Helms	Adrian Back	Navy	Howie Dallmar	Pennsylvania	No third team	
Helms	Dale Hall	Army	Bob Dille	Valparaiso	No third team	
Helms	Vince Hanson	Washington State	Arnie Ferrin	Utah	No third team	
Helms	Bill Henry	Rice	Billy Hassett	Notre Dame	No third team	
Helms	Walt Kirk	Illinois	Jack Hewson	Temple	No third team	
Helms	Bob Kurland	Oklahoma A&M	Paul Hoffman	Purdue	No third team	
Helms	George Mikan	DePaul	Jim Jordan	North Carolina	No third team	
Helms	Max Morris	Northwestern	Don Otten	Bowling Green	No third team	
Helms	Howie Schultz	Hamline	Bill Putnam	UCLA	No third team	
Helms	Herb Wilkinson	Iowa	Arnie Risen	Ohio State	No third team	
Converse	Arnie Ferrin	Utah	Howie Dallmar	Pennsylvania	Ernie Calverley	Rhode Island
Converse	Wyndol Gray	Bowling Green	Billy Hassett	Notre Dame	Don Grate	Ohio State
Converse	Walt Kirk	Illinois	Bill Henry	Rice	Dale Hall	Army
Converse	Bob Kurland	Oklahoma A&M	Dick Ives	Iowa	Vince Hanson	Washington State
Converse	George Mikan	DePaul	Arnie Risen	Ohio State	Max Morris	Northwestern
Argosy Magazine	Don Grate	Ohio State	Ernie Calverley	Rhode Island	Hy Gotkin	St. John's
Argosy Magazine	Billy Hassett	Notre Dame	Bob Dille	Valparaiso	Dale Hall	Army
Argosy Magazine	Dick Ives	Iowa	Arnie Ferrin	Utah	Bill Kotsores	St. John's
Argosy Magazine	Bob Kurland	Oklahoma A&M	Bill Henry	Rice	Max Morris	Northwestern
Argosy Magazine	George Mikan	DePaul	Walt Kirk	Illinois	Herb Wilkinson	Iowa
Sporting News	Howie Dallmar	Pennsylvania	Bob Dille	Valparaiso	Dale Hall	Army
Sporting News	Arnie Ferrin	Utah	Vince Hanson	Washington State	Bill Henry	Rice
Sporting News	Wyndol Gray	Bowling Green	Billy Hassett	Notre Dame	Bill Kotsores	St. John's
Sporting News	Bob Kurland	Oklahoma A&M	Fritz Nagy	Akron	Max Morris	Northwestern
Sporting News	George Mikan	DePaul	Herb Wilkinson	Iowa	Hank O'Keeffe	Rensselaer

== See also ==
- 1944–45 NCAA men's basketball season
