= Herb Wilkinson =

American basketball player (1923–2026)

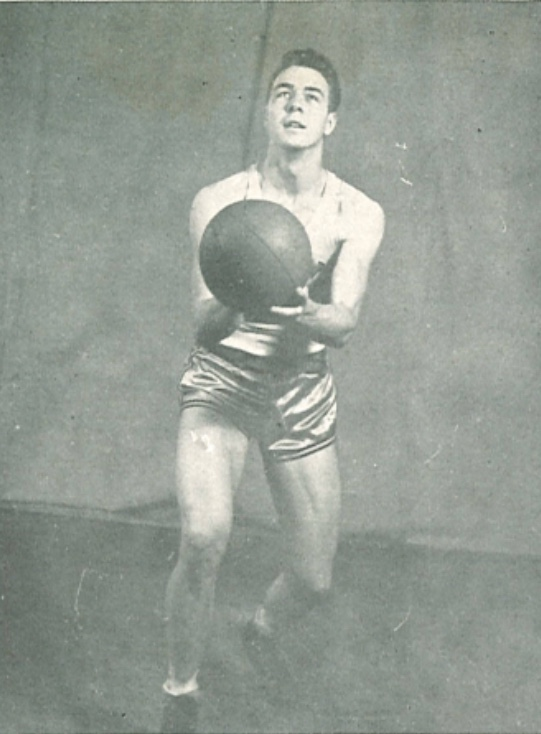
- Wilkinson from the 1947 Hawkeye

Personal information
- Born: December 13, 1923 Hurricane, Utah, U.S.
- Died: May 19, 2026 (aged 102) Cedar Hills, Utah, U.S.
- Listed height: 6 ft 4 in (1.93 m)

Career information
- High school: East (Salt Lake City, Utah)
- College: Utah (1943–1944); Iowa (1944–1947)
- Position: Guard
- Number: 28

Career highlights
- NCAA champion (1944); Consensus second-team All-American (1945); 2× Second-team All-American – Helms (1946, 1947); 3× First-team All-Big Ten (1945–1947)
- Stats at Basketball Reference

Herbert Wells Wilkinson (December 13, 1923 – May 19, 2026) was an American college basketball player who won the 1944 NCAA Men's Division I Basketball Tournament as a freshman while playing for Utah. He then transferred to the University of Iowa as a sophomore and became a three-time All-American.

== Early life ==
Wilkinson was born in Hurricane, Utah, and raised as a member of the Church of Jesus Christ of Latter-day Saints. He attended East High School in Salt Lake City. When Wilkinson was a sophomore he only stood 5 ft 2 in (1.57 m); by the time he enrolled in college, however, he had grown to 6 ft 3 in (1.91 m). His childhood home also had a high jump pit, and in addition to his basketball skills, Wilkinson became an excellent high jumper, placing fourth at the 1945 NCAA Division I Outdoor Track and Field Championships.

== College ==
=== Utah (1943–1944) ===
Wilkinson matriculated at the University of Utah in the fall of 1943. He had stopped growing at 6 ft 4 in (1.93 m) but still possessed the dribbling and shooting abilities he had honed as a smaller high school player. As a very tall guard for that era, he helped lead the Redskins (now known as the Utes) to the NCAA tournament.

The Arkansas Razorbacks men's basketball team, who had originally qualified for the NCAA tournament, was victimized by an auto accident. While attempting to fix a flat tire after returning from a scrimmage in Fort Smith, Arkansas, Deno Nichols and Ben Jones, two of Arkansas' starters, were injured when another car rammed into the back of their station wagon. The severity of the accident caused Arkansas to withdraw from the upcoming NCAA tournament. In need of a replacement, the NCAA committee turned to Utah, despite the fact that the Redskins had four losses and had just lost their first-round game in the NIT tournament. Utah had one player, Lyman Condie, a medical student, who quit the team midway through the season to pursue medical school. Additionally, all of Utah's players were raised within 30 miles of the Utah campus. These players included Arnie Ferrin, Fred Sheffield, and Wat Misaka who was of Japanese descent.

Utah defeated Missouri in the opening round, 45–35, and then defeated Iowa State, 40–31, in the Final Four (back then, only eight teams qualified for the tournament). In the NCAA Championship game, Utah and Dartmouth played one another evenly. The game went into overtime, and Utah prevailed 42–40 for the school's first (and still only) men's national basketball championship. Wilkinson scored seven points in the game, including the game's winning basket in the extra period with five seconds remaining. Standing at the top of the key, he received a pass from Bob Lewis and then shot. The ball bounced off the front of the rim and dropped into the net, securing Utah the national championship.

=== Iowa (1944–1947) ===
Herb Wilkinson transferred to the University of Iowa after one season at Utah. He wanted to be a dentist, but Utah lacked a dental school. Clay, his older brother, was discovered playing basketball at a Cedar Rapids YMCA by Iowa coach "Pops" Harrison and told Harrison that he would play for Iowa if he could bring his younger brother to play. The next day, Harrison saw Herb's picture on the front page of the newspaper with his teammates lifting him on their shoulders for having made the championship-winning shot. He called Clay and asked, "Is that your little brother?" When Clay said yes, Harrison responded, "Hell, bring him along."

The Wilkinson brothers' first season at Iowa was in 1944–45. They joined incoming freshman star Murray Wier and three solid sophomores—Dick Ives, Jack Spencer and Dave Danner—in what would be a Big Ten Conference-winning season. The Hawkeyes finished 17–1 overall (11–1 in conference play) and their only loss came to Illinois by one point. Herb averaged 9.6 points per game while Clay, a junior, averaged 11.5 ppg as the team's starting center. Despite Clay's slightly better numbers, Herb was honored as a consensus Second Team All-American along with fellow sophomore teammate Ives. It was Herb's ball-handling, leadership, and ability to score long-range shots that would deflate opponents' morale that played a large part in his selection. That year's team was also the first in school history to win an outright Big Ten championship.

Over the next two seasons, Wilkinson's junior and senior seasons, the Hawkeyes finished with 14–4 (8–4) and 12–7 (5–7) records, respectively. Herb said, "We were good enough to win the Big Ten title all three years. It's kind of sickening that we didn't. But Clay had to have an operation—he'd fallen on his tailbone one year—and Danner had some back problems. Still, we were good enough to win the championship more than just that first year." He averaged 8.3 ppg and 9.3 ppg those years, and although he was not a consensus selection, Wilkinson earned his second and third consecutive Helms Foundation All-American honors.

When Herb Wilkinson's college basketball career ended after the 1946–47 season, he had become Iowa's only three-time First Team All-Big Ten and three-time All-American honoree in addition to having won a national championship as a freshman while at Utah. He finished his Iowa career with 489 points in 53 games. He scored a career-high 22 points against Indiana on February 22, 1947. Wilkinson would later be named to the University of Iowa All-Century Team.

== Later life and death ==
For the first year after graduation, Wilkinson was studying in an anesthesiology program, deciding to forgo a professional basketball career. Then, the Minneapolis Lakers of the Basketball Association of America (BAA) made him such a good offer that he decided to give it a shot. Being a very religious and devout member of the Church of Jesus Christ of Latter-day Saints, he agreed to play on the condition that he had Sundays off. Wilkinson said:

"One Sunday I wasn't there and the owner asked where I was. The coach said "he doesn't play on Sundays", and the owner sent me a note saying I had to play on Sundays or he would release me. I'm not sure he was serious, but I quit basketball and went off on a mission for two years."

After his mission for two years in the United Kingdom, Wilkinson finished his schooling and became a dentist instead. Wilkinson chalked up his personal success in life to his national championship season with Utah as a freshman. "Anything like that gives you more confidence to do other things in life," he says. "You think, Gee, if we won the NCAAs and weren't expected to, we could probably do a lot of other things we didn't think we could do."

Wilkinson was also an accomplished masters athlete, competing at track and field competitions beginning at age 77.

Wilkinson died at his home in Cedar Hills, Utah, on May 19, 2026, at the age of 102.
