= Dick Ives =

American basketball player

Personal information
- Born: July 22, 1924 Diagonal, Iowa, U.S.
- Died: May 5, 1997 (aged 71) Miami, Florida, U.S.
- Listed height: 6 ft 1 in (1.85 m)
- Listed weight: 156 lb (71 kg)

Career information
- High school: Diagonal (Diagonal, Iowa)
- College: Iowa (1943–1947)
- NBA draft: 1947: – round, –
- Drafted by: Pittsburgh Ironmen
- Position: Forward
- Number: 20

Career highlights
- Consensus second-team All-American (1945); 2× Third-team All-American – Converse, True (1944); True (1946)
- Stats at Basketball Reference

Richard C. Ives (April 26, 1926 – May 5, 1997) was an American basketball player for the University of Iowa from 1943–44 to 1946–47. A native of Diagonal, Iowa, Ives passed up the opportunity to play college basketball at Drake University on a full athletic scholarship so that he could play at Iowa under coach "Pops" Harrison. Ives had been a stand-out basketball player at Diagonal High School and led the team to the state championship.

Ives entered the University of Iowa in the fall of 1943 as a 17-year-old freshman. Due to World War II and the lack of able-bodied male student athletes across the nation, the NCAA allowed freshmen to play varsity sports in college, which until that time had been disallowed. With this rare opportunity, Ives went on to have a highly successful four-year letter-winning career as a Hawkeye. He led the team in scoring for his first three seasons, and as a freshman he scored a then-unheard of school- and Big Ten Conference-record 43 points in a single game. It is still the third highest scoring game in Iowa history and it earned him the nickname "Diagonal Dagger." Ives was a three-time All-American, and in 1944–45 he was voted as a consensus Second Team All-American (coincidentally, fellow sophomore teammate Herb Wilkinson was also a consensus All-American). That season, the Hawkeyes also won the Big Ten Conference championship.

After his senior year in 1946–47, Ives was drafted by the Pittsburgh Ironmen of the Basketball Association of America (which would become the National Basketball Association) but never played a game for them. He instead coached basketball and baseball at Parsons College, married Joan Newton and lived in Cedar Rapids, Iowa where Ives had a hardware business. In 1954 they moved to Miami, Florida, and resided there for the rest of their lives. Ives died on May 5, 1997, in Miami.
