= Pops Harrison =

American basketball coach

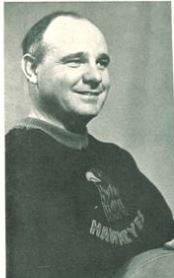
- Harrison during his final season at Iowa

Biographical details
- Born: August 29, 1906; Iowa City, Iowa, U.S.
- Died: August 19, 1967 (aged 60); Iowa City, Iowa, U.S.

Playing career
- 1925–1928: Iowa

Coaching career (HC unless noted)

Basketball
- 1930–1931: Westminster (PA)
- 1931–1942: Iowa (assistant)
- 1942–1950: Iowa
- 1952–1953: Iowa Wesleyan

Football
- 1952–1953: Iowa Wesleyan (assistant)

Administrative career (AD unless noted)
- 1930–1931: Westminster (PA)
- 1950–1951: Waterloo Hawks (GM)

Accomplishments and honors

Championships
- Big Ten (1945)

Lawrence C. "Pops" Harrison (August 29, 1906 – August 19. 1967) was an American basketball coach and administrator. He was the head coach of the Iowa Hawkeyes from 1942 to 1950.

Harrison was born and raised in Iowa City, Iowa, and played basketball at the University of Iowa, graduating in 1928. Harrison spent a year as athletic director and head coach at Westminster College in New Wilmington, Pennsylvania, before resigning in a surprise move at the end of a basketball season where he had led the Titans to a 13–1 record. He then moved to his alma mater as an assistant to head coach Rollie Williams.

In 1942 Williams was called to Navy service and Harrison was elevated to the head coach position. He would be the Hawkeyes' coach for eight seasons, compiling a record of 98–42. His 1944–45 team went 17–1 behind All-Americans Dick Ives and Herb Wilkinson and won the Big Ten Conference title. In the 1949–50 season, Harrison suffered kidney stones and missed several games in the season. At the close of the season, Harrison was fired from his post as the University cited a failure to perform his job duties.

Upon leaving the Hawkeyes, Harrison was named general manager of the professional Waterloo Hawks for their final season. After the Hawks folded, Harrison was hired in 1952 as head basketball coach and assistant football coach at Iowa Wesleyan, roles that he maintained for a school year. Harrison led the basketball Tigers to a 16–5 record for the 1952–53 season.

Harrison died on August 19, 1967, at age 60.
