= Deaths in January 1978 =

The following is a list of notable deaths in January 1978. Entries for each day are listed alphabetically by surname. A typical entry lists information in the following sequence:

- Name, age, country of citizenship at birth, subsequent country of citizenship (if applicable), reason for notability, cause of death (if known), and reference.

== January 1978 ==
=== 1 ===
- Max Ascoli, 79, Italian-American professor of political philosophy and law at The New School for Social Research
- Laurent Deckers, 94, Dutch politician and diplomat
- Shanti Swaroop Dhavan, 71, Indian statesman, diplomat and jurist
- Carle Hessay, 66, German-born Canadian painter
- Elphège Marier
- George Nonte
- Harold L. Peterson, 55, American historian
- Tim Piper
- S. Poniman, 67, Indonesian kroncong singer and comic actor
- Gilbert Roberts, 78, British civil engineer
- Edith Finch Russell, 77, American writer and biographer
- Max Wechsler

=== 2 ===
- Jaka Avšič
- Boris Chernousov, 69, Soviet politician
- Cyril de Zoysa, 81, Sri Lankan industrialist and politician
- Oscar Estrada
- Syd Hutcheson, 80, Australian rules footballer
- Cyril King, 56, American politician, starting in 1949, King worked for the Minnesota senator Hubert Humphrey, becoming the first black staff member of the United States Senate, King served as the second elected governor of the United States Virgin Islands from 1975 until his death in office in 1978, death caused by cancer.
- Anna McGarry
- Jacques Singer
- Lloyd Christ Wicke

=== 3 ===
- Alfred Braun
- Newman H. Clark
- Helge Jung
- Roy Penix
- John Spicer
- Leonard Stone
- Adolf Trowitz
- Prince Kaya Tsunenori
- Claude A. Watson
- Charles Wennergren

=== 4 ===
- Orville Bulman
- John Carrick
- Joe Dawson
- Billy Gray, 73, American comedian, comedy club owner and actor,Gray appeared on The Abbott and Costello Show from 1942 until 1943, portraying a girl named Matilda, whose catchphrase was "I'm only three-and-a-half years old",in 1956, Gray presented Sid Kuller's parody of the Lerner and Loewe musical My Fair Lady, entitled My Fairfax Lady.
- Said Hammami
- Hirata Hide
- Henri Joudiou
- Philip MacDonald
- Peter Wilhousky

=== 5 ===
- Snipe Conley
- Wyatt Emory Cooper, 50, American author, screenwriter, and actor, he wrote an incisive and widely read profile about his deceased friend Dorothy Parker in Esquire magazine, titled, "Whatever You Think Dorothy Parker Was Like, She Wasn't" (1968), his writing includes the films The Chapman Report (1962) and The Glass House (1972), and the book Families: A Memoir and a Celebration (1975), he died on the operating table during his open heart surgery.
- Dwarka Divecha, 59, Indian actor and cinematographer,his best known film is the action-adventure film Sholay (1975), in which he was also involved in creating the setsand the special effects.
- Sally Eilers, 69, American actress, initially prominent as one of Mack Sennett's "flaming youth" comedians in the late 1920s,she was named as one of the WAMPAS Baby Stars in 1928.
- Frederick Barrow Hand
- Henry Jack
- René Koch
- Arne Ragneborn

=== 6 ===
- M. B. Donald
- Thomas Fraser
- Esther Johnson
- Burt Munro, 78, New Zealander motorcycle racer, in 1967, he set the new speed record for the 1000cc Streamliner Modified Fuel category (referred to in the American Motorcyclist Association's National Records as 1000-S-AF) with his modified Indian Scout, this record was set during the 1967 Bonneville Motorcycle Speed Trials where Munro was certified to have traveled at 184 mph (296 km/h),; this record was never contested and still stands as of January 2026, the American Motorcyclist Association has since retired the 1000-S-AF category, Munro died of unspecified "natural causes",after surviving a stroke in 1977.
- John D. MacArthur
- Euan Rabagliati
- Tony Rego

=== 7 ===
- George Burns
- Frederick Burton
- Harry Freeman
- Glenn Hearn
- John Kowalik
- Anatoly Kuzmin
- Hana Meličková
- Arthur Prud'Homme
- Vasily Rakovsky
- Valentina Sperantova

=== 8 ===
- Neville Foster
- André François-Poncet
- Rose Halprin
- Walter Kiernan
- Eva Lombard
- Rick Turner
- Tom Woods

=== 9 ===
- Thomas E. Bourke
- Arthur Cochran
- Mike Enich
- Eddie Gilbert
- Leonard Hilty
- Noble Johnson
- Robert Daniel Murphy
- Richard Norton-Taylor
- Sven Palle Sørensen
- Paul Stovall

=== 10 ===
- Spruille Braden
- Pedro Joaquín Chamorro Cardenal
- Gluck
- Tiziano Longo
- Joan Morrissey
- Merlyn Phillips
- Stanley Potter
- Dorothy Robinson Homer
- Hector Ross
- Bertram Seger
- Hartwig Steenken

=== 11 ===
- Michael Bates, 57, British India-born British actor from Jhansi,he portrayed the co-lead character Cyril Blamire in the sitcom Last of the Summer Winefrom 1973 until 1975, with his character depicted as a Tory and a self-important know-it-all with upper-class aspirations, in real-life, Bates was a supporter of the Conservative Party, with political views "slightly to the right of Thatcher", resulting in arguments between Bates and his leftist co-star Bill Owen,death caused by cancer.
- Anthony Conroy
- Ibn-e-Insha
- May Louise Cowles
- John Laing
- Chauncey D. Leake
- Samuel Leibowitz
- Hasan Majidov
- Felicia Meyer
- Mike Rodden
- Hilmi Abu Shaban
- Don Smith
- Peter Wolff

=== 12 ===
- Marcel Bascoulard
- Robert Harbin
- Arnfried Heyne
- Henriette Ith
- Rosalie Gardiner Jones
- Lee Metcalf
- Monty Naicker
- Duma Nokwe
- Nikolai Pinchuk
- John Powers
- Harry J. Scott
- Arthur Sheekman, 76, American screenwriter, playwright, film critic, and theater critic, a specialist in writing light comedy, Sheekman and Nat Perrin were the co-writers of the radio sitcom Flywheel, Shyster, and Flywheel (1932-1933),the writing duo contributed to the scripts of the Marx Brothers' films Monkey Business (1931) and Horse Feathers (1932),Sheekman died in a nursing facility,as he was incapacitated with pre-senile dementia since 1970.
- Paul Warren

=== 13 ===
- Joseph Beardsell
- Maurice Carême
- Bill Clowers
- Germain Derycke
- Tibor Gergely
- Albert Gomes
- Hubert Humphrey, 66, American politician,he served as a United States senator from Minnesota (1949–1964, 1971-1978),as the Senate Majority Whip (1961-1964),and as the vice president of the United States (1965-1969),as vice president, Humphrey was criticized for his complete and vocal loyalty to Lyndon B. Johnson and to the policies of the Johnson administration, even as many of Humphrey's liberal admirers opposed the president's policies with increasing fervor regarding the Vietnam War, Humphrey's critics were vocal and persistent: even Humphrey's nickname, "the Happy Warrior", was used against him;,the nickname initially referred not to Humphrey's military hawkishness, but rather to his crusading for social welfare and civil rights programs.
- Henry Hunloke
- Merwin Jacobson
- Joe McCarthy
- Hugh J. McMenamin
- Severino Menardi
- William V. O'Regan

=== 14 ===
- Harold Abrahams, 78, English English track and field athlete and freemason, at the 1924 Summer Olympics, Abrahams won the 100 m contest in a time of 10.6 seconds, beating all the American favourites, including the 1920 gold-medal winner Charley Paddock.
- Bernard Ardisana
- François Billoux
- Charles Burgess
- Clarence Dill
- Jack Foster
- Étienne Gajan
- Kurt Gödel, 71, Austrian-born American logician, mathematician, cosmologist, and philosopher, in his two-page paper Zum intuitionistischen Aussagenkalkül (1932), Gödel refuted the finite-valuedness of intuitionistic logic;, in the proof, he implicitly used what has later become known as Gödel–Dummett intermediate logic (or Gödel fuzzy logic), death caused by self-starvation. Gödel developed an obsessive fear of being poisoned, and ate only food prepared by his trusted wife, Adele Nimbursky. Following Adele's hospitalization in late 1977, Gödel refused to eat anything in her absence; he weighed 29 kilograms (65 lb) when he died.
- Jong Il-ryong
- Blossom Rock

=== 15 ===
- Esther Norma Arrostito
- Thérèse Bonney
- Lauro Delgado
- Sonny Easley
- Jack Jackson
- Khan Joynul
- Maud A. Merrill
- Thein Pe Myint
- Desmond Niland
- Teofil Ociepka
- Frank Peake
- Aldo Putelli
- Gordon Waite Underwood
- David Zakai

=== 16 ===
- A. Bhimsingh
- Helen Corbitt
- William Cushion
- Joe Fabbro
- Frank Facer
- Jean Gounot
- Svein Helling
- Naoki Hoshino
- Kieth Hymmen
- A. V. Kulasingham
- H. L. Lindquist
- Virginia Pope
- Nadimpalli Venkata Lakshmi Narasimha Rao

=== 17 ===
- Samuel Storey, Baron Buckton
- Muzaffar Ahmed Chowdhury
- Atanas Dalchev
- Reginald Hayward
- Nancy Hewins
- Antonia Elisabeth Korvezee
- Wu Mi
- Hugh Sells
- Sotero Sanz Villalba

=== 18 ===
- Hasan Askari
- Carl Betz, 56, American actor, he portrayed the pediatrician Dr. Alex Stone in the sitcom The Donna Reed Show (1958-1966),death caused by terminal and inoperable lung cancer.
- William Dudley
- Clark Haas, 58, American cartoonist, owner of the animation studio Cambria Studios,and pioneer jet pilot,he was the creator and producer of the animated television series Clutch Cargo (1959-1960).
- Robert Hewitt
- Henry H. Kessler
- John Lyng, 72, Norwegian politician and member of the Norwegian resistance movement,he briefly served as the prime minister of Norway from August to September 1963, although the Lyng cabinet only lasted for a month, it proved that the non-socialist parties were capable of forming a government in Norway,; following the 1965 elections, the non-socialist parties won a majority with Per Borten as Prime Minister, and Lyng as the new Minister of Foreign Affairs,death caused by cancer.
- Junius Matthews, 87, American actor, primarily remembered as a voice actor,) he portrayed Archimedes in The Sword in the Stone (1963), and he was the regular voice actor of Rabbit from 1966 until 1977.
- Allan MacDonald
- Junius Matthews
- Andrew Moscrip
- R. M. Pendrigh
- Marguerite Reuche
- Bhim Sen Sachar
- Muhammad Sabry Sorboni
- Walter H. Thompson
- Vladimir Vitkovsky

=== 19 ===
- Arch Bell
- Bijon Bhattacharya, 61-62 (date of birth uncertain), Indian actor and playwright,he was one of the founders of the Indian People's Theatre Association and the husband of the leftist writer and activist Mahasweta Devi.
- Yoshiaki Demachi
- Mette Gregaard
- Saburo Ito
- Marius Jaccard
- George Lowery
- Vicente Rao
- Milt Shoffner

=== 20 ===
- Harry Allen
- Dit Clapper, 70, Canadian professional ice hockey player and coach, hobbled by injuries and with his skills eroded, Clapper originally retired before the start of the 1946–47 season, but returned to play in November 1946 to replace the injured Jack Crawford in the Boston Bruins' lineup, he played only sporadically thereafter, and retired for good on February 12, 1947, he led the Bruins to a 10–1 victory over the New York Rangers in his final game, death caused by complications from a 1973 stroke.
- Leslie George Cole
- George Currie
- George Ellison
- Marianne Fieglhuber-Gutscher
- Gloria Fonda
- Gilbert Highet
- Godfrey Matheson
- Nilmoni Phukan Sr

=== 21 ===
- Hugh S. Balkam
- C. Jasper Bell
- Hermann Dahlmann
- William Girdler, 30, American filmmaker, he directed 9 feature films between 1972 and 1978, primarily horror films and action films,he was killed in a helicopter crash in the Philippines, while scouting filming locations for a planned film about drug smuggling.
- Oleksa Hirnyk
- Carl T. Nelson
- Oton Postružnik
- Tibor Püspöki
- Popsie Randolph
- Olav Sundal
- Austin Trevor, 80, Irish actor, Trevor debuted the role of detective Hercule Poirot on screen in the British film Alibi (1931);, Trevor reprised the role of Poirot twice, in the sequel films Black Coffee (1931) and Lord Edgware Dies (1934), Trevor said once that he was probably cast as Poirot simply because he could do a French accent.
- Freda Utley
- Ruth Sawtell Wallis
- Paul-Marie Yembit

=== 22 ===
- Gerry Britt
- Stefan Czmil
- Marcel Leborgne
- Oliver Leese
- Florence Sancroft
- Herbert Sutcliffe, 83, English professional cricketer,Sutcliffe's record in Test cricket is outstanding, he is the only English batsman who has averaged more than 60 runs per innings in a completed career, and his statistical record compares favourably with anyone except Don Bradman, Sutcliffe's batting average never dropped below 60 throughout his entire Test career and Javed Miandad is the only other player whose average never dropped below 50 in a career of at least 20 innings.
- Paolo Violi

=== 23 ===
- Václav Antoš
- Pierre Béguin
- William Edward Bergin
- Cormac Breslin
- Foster A. Dunlap
- Alethea Garstin
- Frank Hughes
- Thurman Jennings
- Terry Kath, 31, American singer and guitarist, primarily remembered as the bandleader and best soloist of the rock band Chicago; Kath's vocal, jazz and hard rock influences are regarded as integral to the band's early sound,death caused by an unintentional self-inflicted gunshot wound to the head. Joking that the band technician Don Johnson feared that Kath was going to blow his own brains out,Kath then placed an unloaded gun to his own temple and pulled the trigger. Apparently unbeknownst to Kath, the gun actially had a round in the chamber, and he died instantly from the gunshot.
- Walter Keiner
- Carmen Mondragón
- Jack Oakie
- Walter Oxley
- André Paiement
- Renato Scorticati
- Philip Sporn
- Kelly Thordsen, 61, American actor, he portrayed Sgt. Bruce in the science fiction comedy Invasion of the Saucer Men (1957), Detective Sgt. Hank Johnson in the film noir City of Fear (1959), and Sheriff L. D. Wicker in the neo-noir political thriller The Parallax View (1974),death caused by cancer.

=== 24 ===
- William Barclay
- Davis Evan Bedford
- Arch Bobbitt
- George Cole
- Roger B. Colton
- Lola Cueto
- Jeffrey Lynn Hand
- Herta Oberheuser
- Friedrich Porges, 87, Austrian-American film director, publisher, screenwriter, and author,following his emigration to the United States in 1943, Porges subsequently lived and worked continuously as a journalist, correspondent, critic, and screenplay editor in Los Angeles almost up until his death in 1978,he wrote the German-language versions of the Walt Disney animated feature films Fantasia (1940), Saludos Amigos (1942), and Bambi (1942).
- Georges Speicher
- Roger Blake West

=== 25 ===
- David L. Cole
- József Domokos
- Fred Ferris
- Skender Kulenović
- Ace Powell
- Melanie Rauk
- Else Reval
- Lloyd Stalder

=== 26 ===
- Jan Bouws
- Heino Freyberg
- Leo Genn, 72, English actor and barrister,he was part of the British unit that investigated war crimes at the Bergen-Belsen concentration camp and later was an assistant prosecutor at the Belsen war crimes trials in Lüneburg, Lower Saxony,he was nominated for the Academy Award for Best Supporting Actor for his role as Petronius in the historical film Quo Vadis (1951).
- Louay Kayali
- Francesco Mimbelli
- Thomas Pierie
- Percy John Rowe
- Charles Harvey Sells

=== 27 ===
- L. O. Abeyaratne
- Leonie Brandt
- Myrtle Broome
- Amy Katherine Browning
- Norman Brunsdale
- Robert Chorley, 1st Baron Chorley
- Sarge Connally
- Oscar Homolka, 79, Austrian actor, veteran lieutenant of the Austro-Hungarian Army during the First World War, he was nominated for the Academy Award for Best Supporting Actor for his role as Uncle Chris Halverson in the drama film I Remember Mama (1948), death caused by pneumonia.
- Neva Dell Hunter
- Robert Scurlark Moore
- Monte Pearson

=== 28 ===
- John Leland Champe
- Roger B. Colton
- Léon Damas
- Keith Froome
- Sture Gillström
- Arnold Hauser
- Greta Johansson
- Jerzy Kuryłowicz
- Piero Postini
- Larry Raines
- Claude Toovey

=== 29 ===
- A. J. Brown, 80, English actor and military veteran with service in both world wars, he won the Military Cross for his service in the First World War, he died on stage while taking part in a theatrical perfornance of the comedy Donkey's Years (1976).
- Wallace Downey
- Stanisław Dygat
- Adhemar Gonzaga
- Tim McCoy, 86, American actor, military veteran with service in both world wars, rodeo competitor, and expert in Native American life, spending his early life as a ranch hand in Wyoming, McCoy developed an extensive knowledge of the customs and languages of the local Native American tribes,he was considered an expert in the Indian sign language and was named "High Eagle" by his associates in the Arapaho tribe of the Wind River reservation, as an actor in the 1930s, McCoy was primarily associated with the"well-made" B-movies of Columbia Pictures,death due to heart disease.
- Ward Moore
- William T. Murphy
- Frank Nicklin
- Rudolf Piowaty
- Hansjürgen Reinicke
- John A. Shelburne
- Sam Thompson

=== 30 ===
- Helen Jeffreys Bakhtiar
- Marie-Louise Damien, 88, French actress and singer,her singing debut occurred in 1911 at the Pépinière and was followed by a performance at the Alhambra-Maurice Chevalier,she was performing on Broadway until 1916, but she then returned to France and sang on the war front for the remainder of World War I.
- Margaret Donahue
- Nadezhda Fedutenko, 62, Soviet Air Force officer and combat pilot,starting in January 1943, she flew combat missions for the 587th Bomber Aviation Regiment, one of the three female combat flying units established by Marina Raskova.
- Leonard Feeney
- Ross Kananga, 32, American crocodile farm owner and stuntman, he migrated to Jamaica in 1969, where he established a crocodile farm in 1 hectare (2 acres) of virgin mangrove territory in Falmouth;, by late 1970, with the help of locals whom he befriended, Kananga opened the Jamaica Swamp Safari, which featured hundreds of American crocodiles, three American alligators, a python, a pair of lions, and a chimpanzee; Kananga had a particularly close relationship with a pair of black leopards whom he named Angel and Satan.Kananga's Swamp Safari was used as a filming location for the spy film Live and Let Die (1973),Kananga suggested the stunt of James Bond (played by Roger Moore) jumping on crocodiles, and was enlisted by the producers to perform it himself, the scene required five takes to complete, including one in which the last crocodile snapped at Kananga's heel, tearing his trousers and causing him a number of injuries; one required 193 stitches,; Kananga was paid $60,000 for his contribution, Kananga died of a cardiac arrest while spearfishing in Collier County in the Everglades.
- Mindru Katz
- Elmer A. Lampe
- David Millard
- Yuan Muzhi
- László Nagy
- Ralph Twitchell
- Ermanno Vallazza
- Wilson Warlick
- Oscar O. Wolfe Jr.

=== 31 ===
- Domenico Bernasconi
- Charles Travis Clay
- Sushil Kumar De
- Harrison Forman
- Theron Lynd
- Pearl Anna Neal
- Péter Piti
- Reginald Robotham
- Leo Seltzer

== Sources ==
- Barson, Michael, ed. (1988). Flywheel, Shyster, and Flywheel: The Marx Brothers' Lost Radio Show. Pantheon Books. ISBN 0-679-72036-7.
- Bret, David (1992). Maurice Chevalier: Up on top of a Rainbow. London, England: Robson Books Ltd. ISBN 978-0-860-51789-4.
- Conway, Kelley (2004). Chanteuse in the City: The Realist Singer in French Film. Oakland, California: University of California Press. ISBN 978-0-520-93857-1.
- "Damia". The Daily News. New York City. February 1, 1978. p. 59 – via Newspapers.com.
- Alan Hill, Herbert Sutcliffe: Cricket Maestro, Simon & Schuster, 1991; Stadia, 2007 (2nd edition)
- Liebman, Roy (2000). The Wampas Baby Stars: A Biographical Dictionary, 1922–1934. Jefferson, North Carolina: McFarland. ISBN 0-7864-0756-5.
- Reiff, Corbin (May 11, 2013). "Forgotten Heroes: Terry Kath". Premier Guitar. Archived from the original on January 8, 2021.
- Stuart, Gloria; Thompson, Sylvia (1999). I Just Kept Hoping. Boston: Little, Brown, and Company. p. 138. ISBN 0-316-81571-3.
- Tuska, Jon (1974). "The American Western Cinema: 1903–Present", in Nachbar, Focus on the Western, pp. 25–43.
- Vine, Andrew (August 17, 2011). Last of the Summer Wine: The Story of the World's Longest-Running Comedy Series. London: Aurum Press. ISBN 978-1-845-13711-3.
