= Donald Smith =

Donald or Donnie Smith may refer to:

== Arts and entertainment ==
- Donald Smith (tenor) (1920–1998), Australian tenor
- Donnie "Beezer" Smith (1924–2022), American child actor
- Robin Donald (Donald Robin Smith, born 1942), Australian operatic tenor
- John Gohorry (1943–2021), British poet, born Donald Smith

== Business and industry ==
- Donald Smith, 1st Baron Strathcona and Mount Royal (1820–1914), Canadian railway financier and diplomat
- Donald J. Smith (1924–2013), Canadian business leader
- Donald N. Smith (born 1940), American restaurant executive
- Donnie Smith (businessman) (born 1959), American businessman

== Law and politics ==
- Donald Smith (banker) (c.1740–1808?), Scottish Lord Provost of Edinburgh
- Donald Smith (politician) (1905–1985), Canadian politician
- Donald MacKeen Smith (1923–1998), Canadian politician in Nova Scotia
- Donald R. Smith (1926–1982), American politician in Illinois

== Sports ==
=== Cricket ===
- Donald Smith (cricketer, born 1923) (1923–2021), English cricketer
- Donald Smith (Lancashire cricketer) (1929–2004), English cricketer
- Donald Smith (cricketer, born 1933) (1933–2015), English cricketer

=== Other sports ===
- Zaid Abdul-Aziz (born Donald A. Smith, 1946), American basketball player
- Donald Smith (American football coach) (born 1967)
- Donald Smith (defensive back) (born 1968), Canadian football player
- Donnie Smith (soccer) (born 1990), American soccer player

== Others ==
- Donald Smith (priest) (1926–2014), British Anglican priest
- Donald Smith (academic) (born 1946), Canadian professor of French language studies
- Donald B. Smith (born 1947), U.S. Army brigadier general

== See also ==
- Don Smith (disambiguation)
- Donald Wood-Smith, professor of clinical surgery
- Helen Donald-Smith, English Victorian artist
