= Archibald Bell =

Archibald Bell may refer to:

- Archibald Bell (writer) (1776–1854), Scottish writer
- Archibald Bell Sr. (1773–1837), Australian politician
- Archibald Bell Jr. (1804–1883), Australian explorer and politician
- Archibald Bell (cricketer) (1868–1948), Guyanese cricketer
- Archie Bell (footballer) (born 1965), Scottish footballer
- Archie Bell (singer) (born 1944), American singer
- Arch Bell (1905–1978), Australian footballer
