= Don Smith =

Don Smith may refer to:

== Sport ==
- Don Smith (ice hockey, born 1887) (1887–1959), Canadian ice hockey player
- Don Smith (basketball, born 1910) (1910–1994), American college basketball player at the University of Pittsburgh
- Don Smith (basketball, born 1920) (1920–1996), American basketball player with the Minneapolis Lakers
- Don Smith (ice hockey, born 1929) (1929–2002), Canadian ice hockey player with the New York Rangers
- Don Smith (sprinter) (born 1931), American sprinter, 1953 NCAA 400 m runner-up for the Kansas Jayhawks track and field team
- Don Smith (motorcyclist) (1937–2004), British motorcycle trials rider
- Zaid Abdul-Aziz (Donald A. Smith, born 1946), American basketball player
- Don Smith (basketball, born 1951) (1951–2004), American basketball player with the Philadelphia 76ers
- Don Smith (defensive lineman) (born 1957), American football defensive lineman
- Don Smith (boxer) (born 1963), Trinidad and Tobago boxer
- Don Smith (running back) (born 1963), American football running back
- Don Smith (rower) (born 1968), American rower

== Others ==
- Don Carlos Smith (1816–1841), American leader, missionary, and periodical editor in the early days of the Latter Day Saints movement
- Don Smith (writer), (1909–1978), Canadian journalist and author of spy novels
- Don Smith (songwriter), co-writer of the popular song "Double Shot (Of My Baby's Love)"

== See also ==
- Donn Smith (born 1949), Canadian football player
- Donald Smith (disambiguation)
