= Bulman (surname) =

Bulman is an English surname. It was originally given to bull keepers, from the Middle English bule (bull) + man (man), and was chiefly found in Northumberland. Notable people with the surname include:

- Dannie Bulman (born 1979), British football player
- George Bulman (1896–1963), British pilot
- Matt Bulman (born 1986), British football player
- Nachman Bulman (1925–2002), American rabbi
- Oliver Bulman (1902–1974), British geologist and palaeontologist
- Orville Bulman (1904–1978), American painter
- Tim Bulman (born 1982), American football player
