= Mitterfeld =

Mitterfeld may refer to the following places:

- a cadastral community of Kasten bei Böheimkirchen in Lower Austria, Austria
- a part of the municipality Riedering in the district of Rosenheim, Bavaria
- a place in Sankt Marein bei Knittelfeld, Styria, Austria
