= Sierra Bullets =

American bullet manufacturer

- Company type: Private
- Founded: 1947; 79 years ago
- Headquarters: Sedalia, Missouri, United States
- Area served: Worldwide
- Products: Bullets
- Revenue: $10M–$25M in sales
- Number of employees: 50–100 employees
- Website: www.sierrabullets.com

Founded in 1947 in California, Sierra Bullets is an American manufacturer of bullets intended for firearms. Based in Sedalia, Missouri since 1990, Sierra manufactures a very wide range of bullets for both rifles and pistols. Sierra bullets are used for precision target shooting, hunting and defense purposes. Available calibers range from .204 (suitable for the .204 Ruger) through to .500 (suitable for the .500 S&W Magnum).

== History ==
In the late 1940s, three aircraft machinists, Frank Snow, Jim Spivey and Loren Harbor, rented space from Clint Harris in the Harris Machine Shop in Whittier, California to produce precision rivets for the aircraft industry, along with fishing rod guides and rifle front sight ramps. They were having financial difficulties, so Clint Harris invested about $500 and became a 25% owner in the company. He was basically a non-active owner, while the other 3 actually ran the company. Right after World War II, there was a shortage of bullets, especially quality rifle bullets, and so Frank Snow, a competitive shooter and a part-time Sheriff's deputy, began manufacturing match rifle bullets. Before long, they were selling a 53 grain match bullet to the Hollywood Gun Shop. That bullet is now known as the Sierra #1400 53 grain MatchKing. Before long, the company outgrew that facility and rented a large Quonset hut in Rivera, California. They outgrew that facility and built a larger facility in Whittier, California. They also changed the company name to Sierra Bullets. During that time, they bought out Clint Harris. The bullet business continued to grow. About 1963, Sierra moved to a new plant in Santa Fe Springs, California. This plant was about 25 to 30,000 square feet with a 200-yard range built under the plant.

In 1968, the Leisure Group bought Sierra Bullets. The Leisure Group was a publicly held corporation traded over the counter. The name Leisure Group derived from acquiring small companies in the leisure time industry. Other companies owned by the Leisure Group were Lyman Reloading, High Standard Manufacturing Company, Yard Man, Ben Pearson, Thompson Sprinkler Systems, Flexible Flyer Sleds, Dodge Trophies (Which made the Oscar and Rose Bowl Game trophies) and several other companies, including one that made gym sets.

Soon after purchasing Sierra, the Leisure Group hired Robert Hayden as president to run Sierra. Hayden was a mechanical engineer who was working for Remington Arms at Lake City Army Ammunition Plant at the time. He remained the president of Sierra for 42 years, retiring in 2012 when Pat Daly became president.

In about 1972, the Leisure Group began divesting some of its companies. In 1986, it changed from a publicly owned corporation to a privately held corporation. In 1988, the Leisure Group reorganized and Sierra Bullets became a limited partnership owned by BHH Management, Inc. (managing partner) and Lumber Management, Inc. (limited partner). In 1995, the company again reorganized to a limited liability company with the same ownership.

In the early 70s, Lee Jurras, of Super Vel and AutoMag fame, approached Sierra about making handgun bullets capable of being driven at higher velocities than the normal bullets available at that time. While Sierra had only been manufacturing rifle bullets up until then, they started making a .38 caliber 110-grain hollow cavity bullet for Super Vel with several other calibers to follow soon after.

In the late 1980s, California was beginning to be unfriendly to the manufacturing business with new strict regulations and higher taxes. Robert Hayden, who had been the Manager of Operations/President of Sierra since 1969, had been born and raised in Missouri and often returned to the Lake of the Ozarks near Sedalia, Missouri on his vacations. On one trip, he came up with the idea of moving the plant to Sedalia and approached the owners with the suggestion. After consideration of the benefits of moving to a more centrally located, industry-friendly, lower-tax location, the owners decided to move the company to Sedalia, Missouri. The land was purchased and a 300-meter underground test range was built with a 45,000 square foot manufacturing plant on top of it. Seven key people made the move from California to Missouri. Sierra still remains at that location, where they manufacture over 175 different bullets (as of Jan. 1, 2014) for their green box sales and several proprietary bullets for other companies. They employ about 160 people with 5 full-time Ballistic Technicians answering reloading and firearms questions on a daily basis. The company also employs three full-time range personnel.

In 2012, Sierra added 20,000 square foot for manufacturing and warehouse space.

In September 2020, the company bought the Barnes ammunitions business from bankrupt Remington Outdoor Company.

== Design ==
All Sierra bullet jackets are made from gilding metal. Depending on requirements, bullet cores are manufactured using one of four different lead alloys:

- 6% antimony, 4% tin, 90% lead
- 6% antimony, 94% lead
- 3% antimony, 97% lead
- 1.5% antimony, 98.5% lead

== Rifle Bullets ==
Sierra makes bullets for rifles and handguns. The rifle bullets fall into five categories, based on bullet construction.

=== BlitzKing - Varminter ===
Varminter bullets are designed for varmint hunting. As such, they are normally smaller calibers, and are designed for rapid expansion, and need to be accurate to hit the typically small targets.

=== GameKing ===
The GameKing line of bullets is designed for hunting. They are a boat tail bullet to reduce drag and wind drift. They are designed more heavily than the varmint bullets for better penetration and expansion on larger game than varmints, such as deer and boar.

=== MatchKing ===
MatchKing is Sierra's line of competition bullets. They have a design that gives a high ballistic coefficient and good accuracy. They have been used by many competitors to set world records.

=== Pro-Hunter ===
The Pro-Hunter is a flat-base bullet with a special jacket to provide deep penetration and maximum expansion on large game such as elk.

== Handgun Bullets ==
The Handgun bullets are in two groups, based on bullet construction.

=== Sports Master ===
The Sports Master is a handgun bullet with a hollow-point to facilitate good performance for hunting and defense.

=== Tournament Master ===
Tournament Master bullets are full-metal jacket and designed primarily for competition and recreational shooting.

== Other products ==
Sierra also provides reloading manuals, reloading tools and ballistics software.
