= General Colton =

General Colton may refer to:

- General Joseph Colton, the original "G.I. Joe"
- Roger B. Colton (1887–1978), US Army officer active during World War II

== See also ==
- Colton Greene (1833–1900), a Confederate general during the American Civil War
