= Bulmahn =

Bulmahn is a surname. Notable people with the surname include:

- Edelgard Bulmahn (born 1951), German politician
- Jason Bulmahn (born 1976), American game designer
- Luna Bulmahn (born 1999), German athlete

== See also ==
- Bulman (surname)
