= Charles Burgess =

Charles Burgess may refer to:

- Charles Frederick Burgess, American chemist and engineer
- Charles Burgess (cricketer), English cricketer
- Charles Burgess (footballer), Scottish footballer
- C. B. Fry, English sportsman
- Cathal Brugha (Gaelicisation of Charles Burgess), Irish revolutionary
