= Donald Smith (academic) =

Professor of Québec literature, author, editor

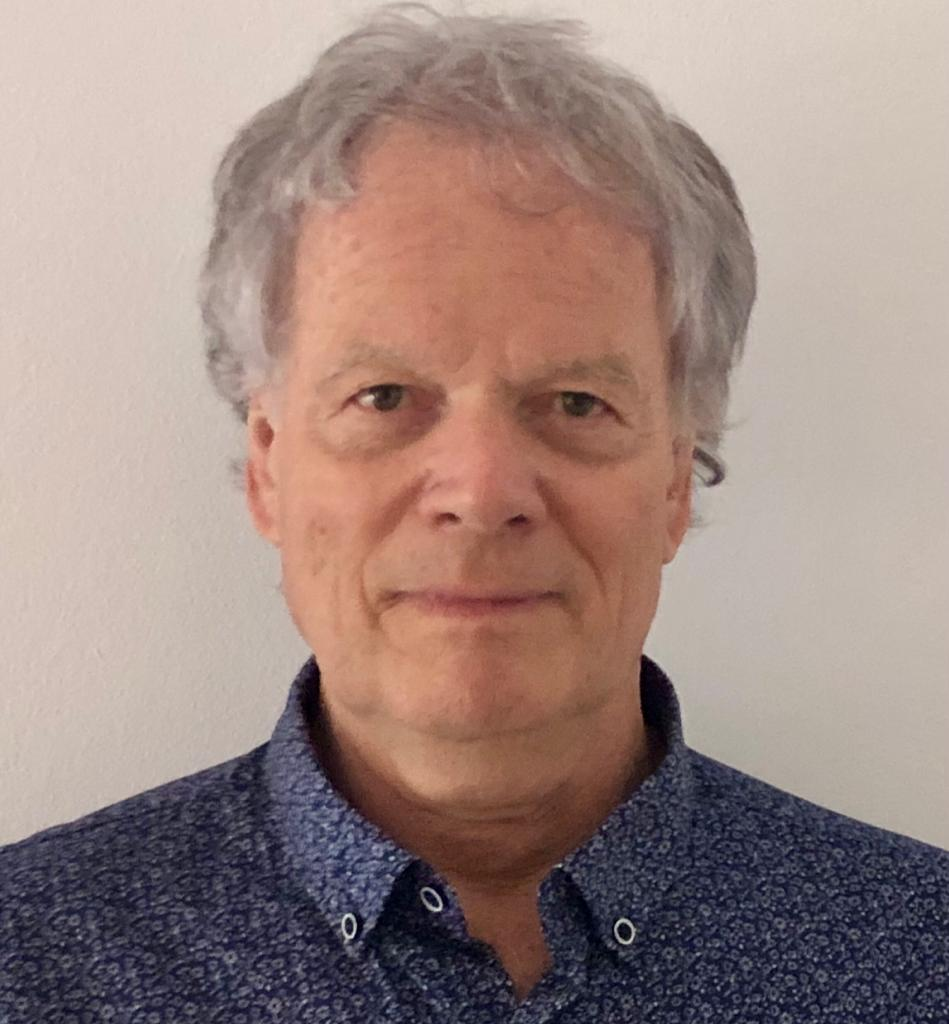

Donald William Smith is a Canadian author who is Professor Emeritus at Carleton University, a specialist of Québec literature and singer-songwriters, and of the French language as it is spoken in North America (Québec, French Canada including Acadia, Louisiana). Smith is the author of seventeen books and numerous articles published in scholarly reviews, newspapers and magazines. Several of these articles have been reproduced on line by the Canadian scholarly publishing platform Érudit.

== Life ==
Born in Toronto in 1946, Donald Smith holds an honours BA (1968) in French from Glendon College at York University. He has a master's degree from the Sorbonne, and a PhD (1979) from the University of Ottawa with a thesis (Les idées sociales dans l'œuvre de Jacques Ferron) on the novels, stories and essays of the Québec writer and doctor Jacques Ferron.

Smith was chair of the Department of French at Carleton University (1978-1981/1996-1998), a member of the Senate of this institution, and a co-founder in 1975 of the Association for Canadian and Québec Literatures.

He was foreign rights manager for the publishing house Québec Amérique (1983-2006) and the director (1982-2008) of the literary series in this publishing house "Littérature d'Amérique: Traduction" in which he published several novels of English-Canadian authors that had not yet appeared in French including Stephen Leacock, the entire works of Lucy Maud Montgomery and the novels of the Breton-Québec-American novelist Jack Kerouac. From 1970 to 1973, he was a book reviewer for the annual literature review Livres et auteurs québécois published by Université Laval, and from 1976 to 1985, he was responsible for interviews in the Québec literature magazine Lettres québécoises.

Smith's most notable books are the Dictionary of Canadian French co-authored with the linguist Sinclair Robinson, and L'Écrivain devant son oeuvre, interviews with Québec and Acadian writers (also appeared in English as Voices of Deliverance.

Gilles Vigneault, conteur et poète, is an essay by Smith on one of Québec's most noteworthy poets, short story tellers and singer-troubadours. Jacques Godbout, du roman au cinéma, published in collaboration with Les Éditions Québec Amérique and the National Film Board of Canada (NFB).

Smith's essay D'une nation à l'autre, translated into English and published as Beyond Two Solitudes, is a political essay that analyses the notion of nations within a single country. Smith has more recently turned his attention to the comparison of the Canada-Québec relationship with that of Spain and Catalonia.

== Selected publications ==
- Ignace Bourget, écrivain, Patrick Imbert, Donald Smith, Adrien Thério, éditions Jumonville, Montréal, 1975, 205 p.
- Textbook edition of Pleure pas Germaine (written in colloquial Québec French called "joual") by Claude Jasmin, Centre éducatif et culturel, Montréal, Sinclair Robinson and Donald Smith, 1973, 159 p., reprinted 1983.
- Manuel pratique du français canadien/Practical Handbook of Canadian French, Sinclair Robinson, Donald Smith, and the collaboration of the Acadian author Antonine Maillet, Macmillan, Toronto, 1973, 172 p. (revised edition 1975; reprinted 1976, 1978).
- L'Ecrivain devant son oeuvre, Québec Amérique, Montréal, 1983, 360 p.
- Practical Handbook of Québec and Acadian French/Manuel pratique du français québécois et acadien, Sinclair Robinson, Donald Smith, and the collaboration of Antonine Maillet, Anansi, Toronto, 1984, 302 p.
- Gilles Vigneault, conteur et poète, Québec Amérique, Montréal, 1984, 160 p. (second printing, March 1985; republished by Québec Loisirs, Hardcover edition, April 1985).
- Gilbert La Rocque, l'Écriture du rêve, Québec Amérique, Montréal, 1985, 148p.
- Voices of Deliverance: Interviews with 14 Québec and Acadian Writers, revised and updated version of L'Ecrivain devant son oeuvre, Anansi, Toronto, 1986, (translated by Professor L. Shouldice), 383 p.
- Dictionary of Canadian French / Dictionnaire du français canadien, Sinclair Robinson and Donald Smith, National Textbook Company (NTC), New York, 1991, 292 p.
- Dictionary of Canadian French/Dictionnaire du français canadien, Sinclair Robinson and Donald Smith, Stoddart, Toronto, 1991, 292 p.
- Dictionary of Canadian French, Sinclair Robinson and Donald Smith, Viburnum, London (England), 1993, 292 p.
- Robidoux, Réjean (1995). "L'ogre et le petit poucet / Gérard Bessette et Gilbert La Rocque". Lettres québécoises. 77: 54.
- Jacques Godbout: du roman au cinéma. Voyage dans l'imaginaire québécois, Québec Amérique, Montréal, 1995, 256 p, with a DVD produced by the National Film Board of Canada.
- D'Une nation à l’autre, Éditions Internationales Alain Stanké, Montréal, 1998, 1999, 166p.
- Cul-de-sac, Yves Thériault, postface de Donald Smith, Typo/Hexagone, Montréal, 1998, 280p.
- Beyond Two Solitudes, Fernwood Press, Halifax, 1999 (translated by Charles Phillips), 143p.
- Canten Giné, homenatge dels països catalans a Joan Pau Giné, cantautor, 2014, Introduction and Postface in Catalan and French de Donald Smith, Col·lectiu Joan Pau Giné, Perpinyà, França, 380p.
