= Edward Ezell =

American historian (1939–1993)

Edward Clinton Ezell (7 Nov 1939, Indianapolis, Indiana – 23 Dec 1993, Northern Virginia) was an American author and professor who served as National Firearms Collection curator at the National Museum of American History, administered by the Smithsonian Institution. He was also the founding Director of the Institute for Research on Small Arms in International Security.

== Background ==
Ezell received an A.B. from Butler University in 1961 and M.A. from the University of Delaware two years later, where he was a Hagley Fellow. In 1969, he received his Ph.D. in the history of science and technology from Case Institute of Technology.

He taught at North Carolina State University and Sangamon State University, Springfield, Illinois.

=== Publications ===
Ezell created the first oral histories on a pair of respected assault rifle designers — Mikhail Kalashnikov and Eugene Stoner of the AK47 and M16 respectively. Prior to his stint with the Smithsonian Institution, Ezell was employed by the National Aeronautics and Space Administration, beginning in 1974, to write about space projects. Publications include The Partnership: a history of the Apollo-Soyuz Test Project. The co-author, Linda Neuman Ezell, was also involved in writing On Mars: Exploration of the Red Planet. Other publications include:

- Small Arms of the World
- Personal Firepower
- Combat Handguns (co-authored with George C. Nonte)
- The Black Rifle: M16 Rifle Retrospective
- The AK47 Story: Evolution of the Kalashnikov Weapons
- The Great Rifle Controversy: Search for the Ultimate Infantry Rifle from World War II to Vietnam and Beyond
- Small Arms Today
- Handguns of the World
- Reflections on the Wall: The Vietnam Veterans Memorial
- The Partnership: A History of the Apollo-Soyuz Test Project

His book Small Arms of the World is considered a standard reference on military pistols, rifles, submachineguns, and light machineguns.

== Death ==
Ezell died of cancer on December 23, 1993. Despite never serving in the military, in recognition of his work for the military he is buried at the National Memorial Cemetery at Quantico.
