= Southwestern College (New Mexico) =

- Former names: Quimby Center; Quimby College
- Motto: "Transforming Consciousness Through Education"
- Type: Private graduate school
- Established: 1976
- Accreditation: HLC
- Chairman: Paul Macks
- President: Thom D. Chesney
- Location: Santa Fe, New Mexico, United States; 35.636093°N 106.054115°W
- Website: www.swc.edu

Southwestern College is a private graduate school in Santa Fe, New Mexico, that specializes in counseling and art therapy. It is the only college or university in the state of New Mexico to offer a Master's Degree in Art Therapy.

== History ==
Southwestern College traces its roots to the Quimby Metaphysical Library, a library which has a large collection of religious and metaphysical books, and manuscripts of American transcendentalist and the Father of the New Thought Movement, Phineas Parkhurst Quimby. The library was founded by Neva Dell Hunter in 1945 in Alamogordo, New Mexico. The library was eventually known as Quimby Memorial Library. The school's vision, mission, philosophy, and programs are also influenced by Rudolf Steiner, Ralph Waldo Emerson, Alice Bailey, perennial wisdom traditions, and Hindu scriptures.

In 1976, the center was rededicated as Quimby College by Robert Waterman, with Hunter as the guest of honor. Hunter's ideas were used by Waterman in founding the core curriculum of the college and its programs. The college's initial intention was to train counselors who were well-versed and practiced in areas of spirituality and consciousness. In 1979, the college started to offer programs in Counseling. Quimby College later became Southwestern College.

In 1996, Southwestern College became accredited by the Higher Learning Commission. In the same year, Marylou Butler became the school's second president. In 1998, the college's Master of Arts in Art Therapy/Counseling was approved by the American Art Therapy Association. In 2006, James Michael Nolan was selected as the third president.

Since 2006, the college has tripled the size of its campus, built an Art Therapy building, created the Tierra Nueva Counseling Center, and launched professional certificate training in Human Sexuality, Infant Mental Health, and Interpersonal Neurobiology. It has also created scholarships for Native Americans and other minority candidates. In February 2019, Ann Filemyr was selected as the fourth president of the college, serving until July 2024 until when she transitioned into Founder and Director of the PhD in Visionary Practice program which she designed. The university's fifth president is Thom D. Chesney.

Since 1980, Southwestern College has offered the "Transformation & Healing Conference" on its campus in Santa Fe.

== Academics ==
The college has a holistic approach to mental health and integrative care. It offers four Master's programs

=== The New Earth Institute ===
The New Earth Institute of Southwestern College offers certificates. The certificate programs are open to people who already have an undergraduate or graduate degree.

== Awards ==
Southwestern College received the Manuel Lujan Jr. Award in the 19th Annual Piñon Awards in 2005.
