= Marianne Fieglhuber-Gutscher =

Austrian painter (1886–1978)

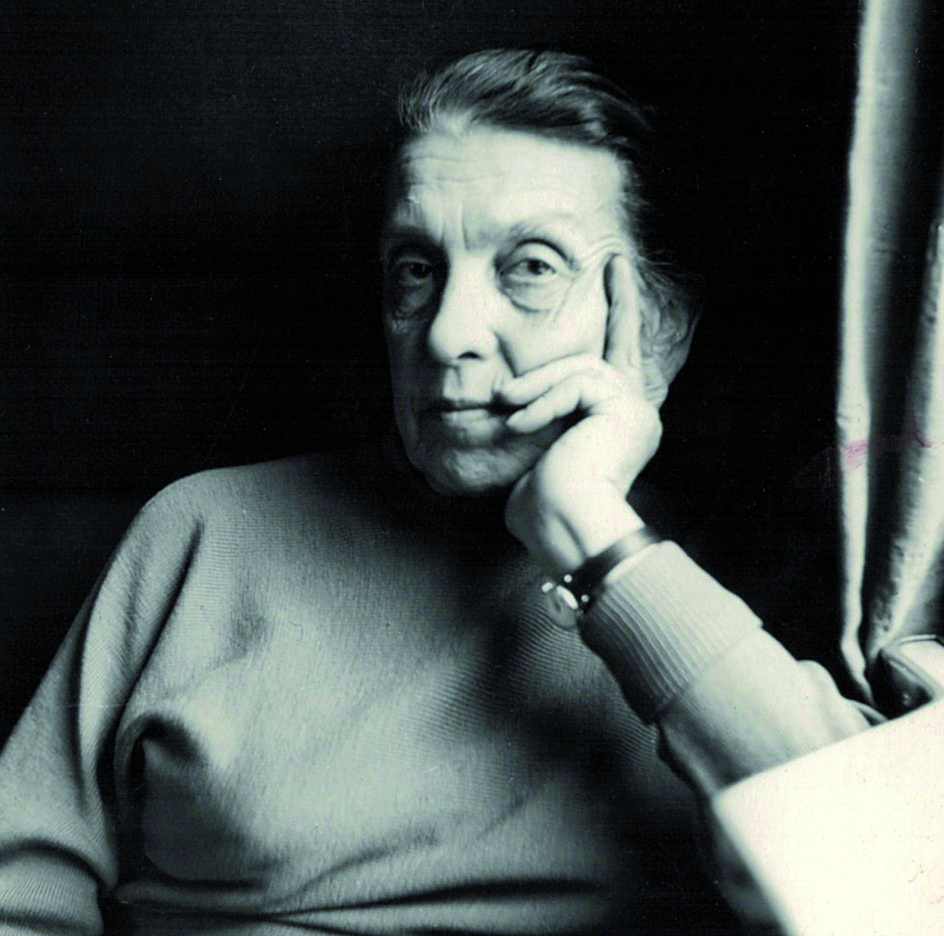
- Marianne Fieglhuber-Gutscher, around 1960
- Born: 14 August 1896; Vienna
- Died: 20 January, 1978; Graz
- Occupation: painter
- Awards: Austrian Decoration for Science and Art, 1969

Marianne Fieglhuber-Gutscher (12 August 1886, Vienna – 20 January 1978, Graz) was an Austrian painter. From the 1910s until her death in 1978, she created a substantial body of work consisting of oil paintings, watercolors, and drawings. Her work focused primarily on portraits, depictions of women, occasional group portraits, female nudes, still lifes and in her later years also landscapes and cityscapes. She regularly participated in exhibitions at the Vienna Künstlerhaus and the Vienna Secession, and in 1977 was honored with a solo exhibition at the Österreichische Galerie Belvedere in Vienna. she received the Austrian Decoration for Science and Art in 1969.

== Life and education ==
She began her studies at the Vienna School of Art for Women and Girls in 1904. Founded in 1897, the institution was the first state art school for women in Vienna, where previously they could only receive private instruction in painting and sculpture. She learned the technique of etching from Ludwig Michalek, and her etchings were exhibited in Vienna, Salzburg, and Leipzig. Fieglhuber-Gutscher studied painting under Max Kurzweil and Rudolf Jettmar. In 1919, she joined the Austrian Association of Women Artists and participated in its annual exhibitions.

== 1930s and World War II ==
In the 1930s, she exhibited regularly at the Künstlerhaus and the Vienna Secession, and her work reached an initial peak. The political developments of those years, along with her husband Eduard Gutscher's disapproval of his wife's artistic career, made her work more difficult once again. Marianne Fieglhuber-Gutscher was critical of Nazi Germany's annexation of Austria, not least because some of her friends were Jewish. During World War II, she lived with her family in Vienna. She joined the Reich Chamber of Fine Arts in 1939 to exhibit and sell her work. In 1943, an exhibition of her work was rejected because it did not comply with the "Führer's Cultural Guidelines". In 1956, she received her first commission for a public artwork. In 1977, her work was exhibited at the Österreichische Galerie Belvedere in Vienna.

== Death ==
She died in Graz on 20 January 1978 at the age of 91. Her grave is located in the cemetery in Kasten bei Böheimkirchen. She continued to work and paint until the end of her life, leaving behind an impressive body of work. In addition to landscapes, cityscapes, and still lifes, her artwork focused primarily on the depiction of women through the female gaze.

== Works ==
- Clivien (Kulturabteilung der Stadt Wien, Kat. Nr. 263), Öl auf Leinwand, 102 × 86 cm (1953)
- Rote Wolke (Kulturabteilung der Stadt Wien, Kat. Nr. 551), Tempera auf Papier, 49 × 63 cm (1955)
- Familie (Kulturabteilung der Stadt Wien, Kat. Nr. KAB386), Keramikmosaik am Haus Troststraße 5–9, Wien-Favoriten, 15 m² (1956)
- Nordische Landschaft (Kulturabteilung der Stadt Wien, Kat. Nr. 1731), Tempera auf Papier, 48,5 × 63 cm (1958)
- Baumlandschaft mit Erdkeller (Privatbesitz), Öl auf Leinwand, 68 × 55 cm
- Glasfenster „Letzte Kommunion des Heiligen Eberhard, Erzbischof von Salzburg“, Zisterzienserstift Rein (1968/69)

== Literature ==
- Roland Widder (Hrsg.), Marianne Fieglhuber-Gutscher, Wien 2022, ISBN 978-3-99126-040-0.
- Gudrun Danzer (Hrsg.), Ladies First! Künstlerinnen in und aus der Steiermark 1850–1950, Ausstellungskatalog Neue Galerie Graz Universalmuseum Joanneum, Graz 2020, ISBN 978-3-7011-8174-2.
- Felix Czeike: Historisches Lexikon Wien. Band 2: De–Gy. Kremayr & Scheriau, Wien 1993, ISBN 3-218-00544-2.
- Kulturabteilung der Stadt Wien MA 7 (Hrsg.): Die fünfziger Jahre. Kunst und Kunstverständnis in Wien. Springer, Wien 2010, ISBN 978-3-7091-0051-6
