= Henriette Ith =

Swiss Esperantist and pacifist

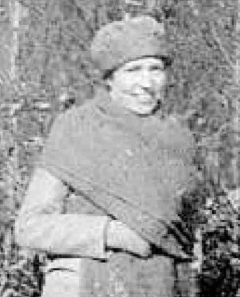
- Ith in 1921
- Born: 31 August 1885; La Chaux-de-Fonds, Switzerland
- Died: 12 January 1978 (aged 92); Geneva, Switzerland
- Other names: Henriette Rémi; Henriette Danneil; Henriette Wille
- Occupation(s): Esperantist, pacifist, photographer

Henriette Ith (née Wille, 31 August 1885 – 12 January 1978), also known as Henriette Rémi or Henriette Danneil, was a Swiss Esperantist and pacifist. Born to a family of watchmakers in La Chaux-de-Fonds, Neuchâtel, she first studied languages then photography, for which she opened a studio in Berlin. After marrying and working in a German military hospital during the First World War, Ith became a political activist for socialism for several years before moving to Geneva, Switzerland. Here, she became involved in the Esperanto movement by directing a magazine, teaching, and translating in the language.

In later life, Ith remarried and studied psychology, becoming a pacifist. She continued to participate in left-wing circles, although to a lesser extent than during her post-war period. In 1942, Ith published a book, Hommes sans Visages (Men without Faces), recounting her experiences during the First World War. Publishing pseudonymously as Henriette Rémi, her identity as its author was lost for half a century.

== Life ==
=== Early life ===
Henriette Ith was born Wille to Jenny (née Borkiewitcz) and Charles Wille on 31 August 1885 in La Chaux-de-Fonds. One of five children, she was from a bourgeoisie family of watchmakers originating from La Sagne, Neuchâtel. Her surname, Wille, was a corruption of the French Vuille, from an error made by a birth registrar sometime in the 18th century. Ith was initially educated by her mother. After secondary school, from 1902 to 1904, she lived in Zürich and England, improving her knowledge of English and German. Ith then studied photography, for which she opened a studio in Berlin, before returning to La Chaux-de-Fonds in 1908. In 1914, she married the German officer Hans Danneil, earning German citizenship (and thereby losing her Swiss citizenship).

=== First World War ===
As the First World War began in 1914, Danneil was called to fight on the front lines – Ith saw him only during his military leave until 1915, when he was wounded and transferred to a military hospital in Verden an der Aller, where she could visit him. During this period, at the hospital where he was recovering, Ith became a nurse for soldiers who had sustained major facial injuries (referred to as "gueules cassées", "broken mouths"), working to provide morale support to them. After her experiences in the war, she felt a duty to change what she saw as a failed bourgeoisie societal system which allowed such tragedies as those she had witnessed. Separating from her husband, who had become a German nationalist during the war, she joined the Internationaler Jugendbund, a group of young socialists. As part of this, Ith was required to become an asceticist, adhering to vegetarianism, teetotalism, and celibacy, as well as an atheist. She joined the Social Democratic Party of Germany (all members of her group were required to join a left-wing political party) in 1920, but left the Jugendbund in 1924, due to exhaustion from her activity with the group. During this period, Ith also transcribed Rudolf Christoph Eucken's book Der Sinn und Wert (Meaning and Value) into braille.

=== Work with Esperanto ===
After leaving the Jugendbund, Ith moved to Geneva, and learnt Esperanto, which she found useful as an international auxiliary language. Ith began to teach the language and became active in the Esperanto community. She became secretary to Pierre Bovet (who was editor of the magazine Esperanto), and worked with Adolphe Ferrière as his editor and secretary, contributing to his work in education reform and translating several of his books. When the International Bureau of Education was founded by Bovet and Édouard Claparède, both of whom she knew, Ith became a member in 1925. She taught Esperanto to its staff to ease communication ahead of the 1929 International Congress on Education. Ith later became a translator for the association Bulteno, and was paid by the Tutmonda Asocio de Geinstruistoj Esperantistaj (International Association of Esperanto Teachers). Ith also taught Esperanto to children to observe its effects, believing that lasting peace came more from the education of individuals than the wealth of a state. She was also one of the principal organisers of the 1927 conference Paco per Lernejo (Peace through School), which was held in Prague.

Between 1928 and 1932, Ith was chief editor of the Esperanto translation of a journal published by the Internationaler Sozialistischer Kampfbund, wanting to better show Esperantists that the Kampfbund supported social democracy in place of communism. However, while she was editor, she seldom signed her articles with her name, due to her position as a German citizen with a limited residency permit in Switzerland; her connections with the Kampfbund created a risk of deportation.

=== Life in Geneva ===
Her work with Esperanto and in politics brought her into trouble with the Swiss authorities; when she requested to have her Swiss citizenship reinstated in 1928, it was denied on the basis of bad reputation. This would have meant that she would have to leave Switzerland with the expiration of her residence permit, so to regain her citizenship, she married the Swiss anarchist Émile Ith, who was seventeen years younger than her, less than five months after having citizenship refused, thus effectively being naturalised Swiss. A conscientious objector, Émile refused to do military service and would be imprisoned multiple times for charges related to this. The Iths studied psychology together at the University of Geneva as free students, and also frequented their local Quakers, as several of their relatives had joined the movement and began promoting anti-violence. Partly due to this contact with the pacifist movement, as well as recommendations by friends, Ith also became interested in the work of Mahatma Gandhi and Hindu philosophy. The couple joined several pacifist organisations, such as the Union mondiale de la femme pour la concorde internationale (International women's union for international concord) and the Mouvement international de la réconciliation (International movement for reconciliation).

Ith may have participated in the Kampfbund's protest against the rise of Nazism in the early 1930s, but otherwise was politically quiet for the remainder of her life. However, she was still active in left-wing circles, corresponding with other activists about topics such as conscientious objection; in 1964, Ith wrote an article for L'Essor about the stigma associated with refusal to do military service. Although not part of any political party, Ith often visited left-wing figures, such as educator Alice Descœudres and Edmond Privat. Aside from her activism for pacifism, Ith was also a proponent for women's rights, freethought, progressive education, and social equality; she also became an activist for the local labour movement. Employed by a Genoese couple until the age of 84, she died on 12 January 1978 in Geneva.

== Hommes sans Visages ==
In 1942, prompted by the onset of the Second World War, Ith released a testimony of her experiences of military hospital life during the First World War. Ith began writing this in 1939, and released it under the title Hommes sans Visages (Men without Faces) under the pen name Henriette Rémi, with publication limited to Romandy. This limited release was a result of its timing: in 1939, Ith had wanted to warn of the horrors that were about to be experienced, but by the time of the book's completion, the Swiss press did not want to publish pacifist material. After its publication, the identity of Ith as the book's author was lost, although the book was cited by several historians; consensus had determined Henriette Rémi to be a Frenchwoman, instead of being written from a German perspective. Ith wrote her book in French, gallicising personal names to better allow a Francophone audience to feel empathy for her characters.

== Sources ==
- Alcalde, Javier [in Esperanto] (2018). "Pacisma aliro" [A Pacifist Approach]. Aliroj al esperanto [Approaches to Esperanto] (in Esperanto). Prague: Kava-Pech. p. 19. ISBN 978-80-87169-86-5 – via HAL.
- Cazals, Rémy (16 December 2016). "Rémi, Henriette (pseudonyme d'Henriette Wille) (1885-1978)" [Rémi, Henriette (pseudonym Henriette Wille)]. Dictionnaire et guide des témoins de la Grande Guerre, par le CRID 14–18.
- Garcia, Stéphane (2014). "Henriette Ith (1885–1978), Une militante aussi discrète qu'engagée" [Henriette Ith (1885–1978), an activist as discrete as committed]. Cahiers d'histoire du mouvement ouvrier (in French). No. 30. Lausanne: Association pour l'étude de l'histoire du mouvement ouvrier AÉHMO. pp. 44–50. doi:10.5169/seals-520287. ISSN 1424-0475 – via E-Periodica.
- Garcia, Stéphane (28 September 2015). "Henriette Rémi, une Suissesse face au visage inhumain de la guerre". La Suisse et la guerre de 1914-1918: actes du colloque tenu du 10 au 12 septembre 2014 au Château de Penthes [Henriette Rémi, a Swiss woman against the inhumane face of war] (in French). Colloque "La Suisse et la guerre de 1914–1918", Société d'histoire de la Suisse romande. Genève: Éditions Slatkine. pp. 107–115. ISBN 978-2-05-102745-8.
- Girard, Jacques (7 July 2014). "L'incroyable vie d'Henriette Rémi" [The incredible life of Henriette Rémi]. Le Journal du Jura (in French). p. 9.
- Schneller, Richard (August 2014). "Virino en milito kaj engaĝiĝo porpaceduka" [A woman in war, committed to education]. eo:Sennaciulo. No. 1309–1310. pp. 24–25.
