= Leonie Brandt =

German-Dutch double agent (1901–1978)

- Born: Gertrud Franziska Pütz; 28 October 1901; Würselen
- Died: 27 January 1978 (aged 76); Amsterdam
- Other name: Leonie Reiman
- Citizenship: German; Dutch (from 1929)
- Occupations: actress spy
- Children: Loek Kessels
- Parents: Johann Paul Pütz (father); Johanna Hubertina Hermanns (mother)

Leonie Brandt (28 October 1901 – 27 January 1978), born as Gertrud Franziska Pütz and also known by the stage name Leonie Reiman, was a German-Dutch actress and double agent. Before and during World War II, she spied for both the Netherlands and Germany. She gained post-war notoriety due to Pieter Menten and the Stadtholder-letter. Many stories about her life are questionable, as she was often the sole source.

== Biography ==
=== Youth ===
Gertrud Franziska Pütz, known as Leonie, was born in 1902 in Bissen, a district in the German city of Würselen. She was the daughter of miner Johann Paul Pütz (1877–?) and Johanna Hubertina Hermanns (1881–?). She was the oldest of four children, having one sister and two brothers. Her maternal grandparents had a Dutch background and lived in the same building, with whom Pütz spent much of her time.

During World War I, Pütz smuggled food from neutral Netherlands, five kilometers away. In December 1915, she was caught by German customs officers on one of her smuggling trips. They recruited her to carry information across the border, hidden in the linings of coats that she had to exchange.

After World War I, Pütz became a nurse. According to herself, she worked in Paris, Aachen, and Metz, where she allegedly carried out tasks for the military intelligence service. On 4 April 1921, Brandt married customs officer Karl Walter Reuber (1891–?) from Aachen. They divorced on 18 November 1923.

=== Moving to the Netherlands ===
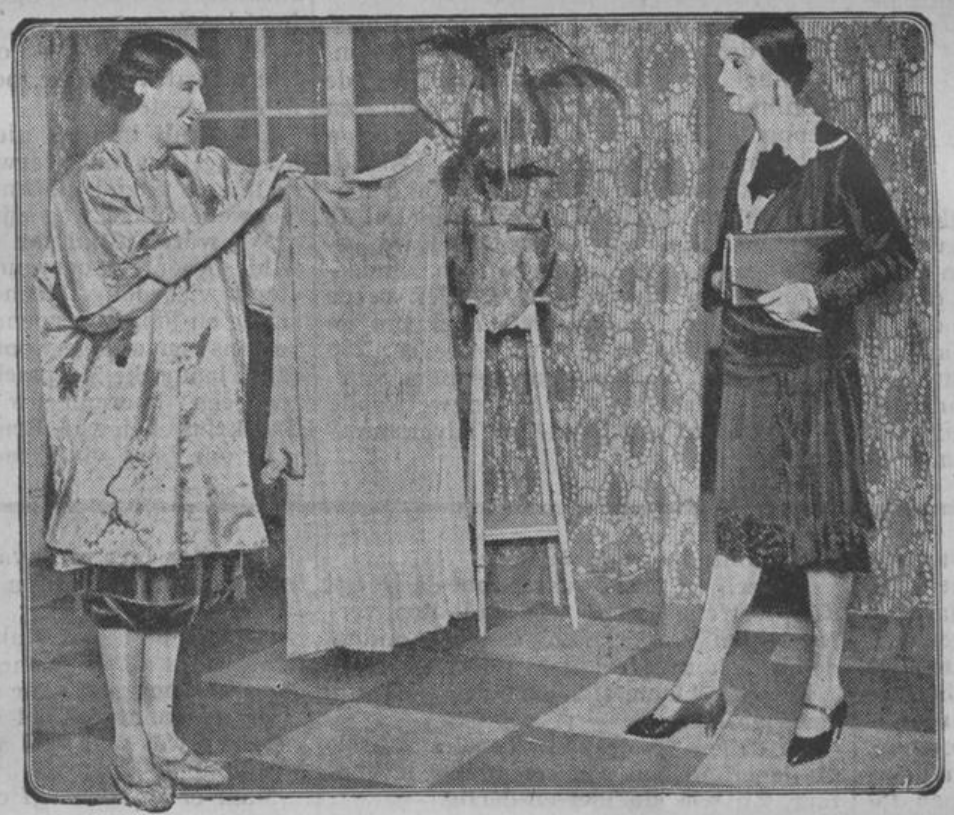
Brandt (right) in the comedy "My father and I" (Dutch: "Mijn Vader En Ik") by Gustaaf Esmann in 1928.

Afterwards, Pütz moved to the Netherlands, first to 's-Hertogenbosch and then registered in Amsterdam on 25 April 1925. A year after arriving, Pütz already played in theatre groups. From 1926, she performed with Het Schouwtooneel. She occasionally played lead roles, with Ko van Dijk Sr. as her co-star. She left Het Schouwtooneel after an elderly patron made "indecent proposals" to her.

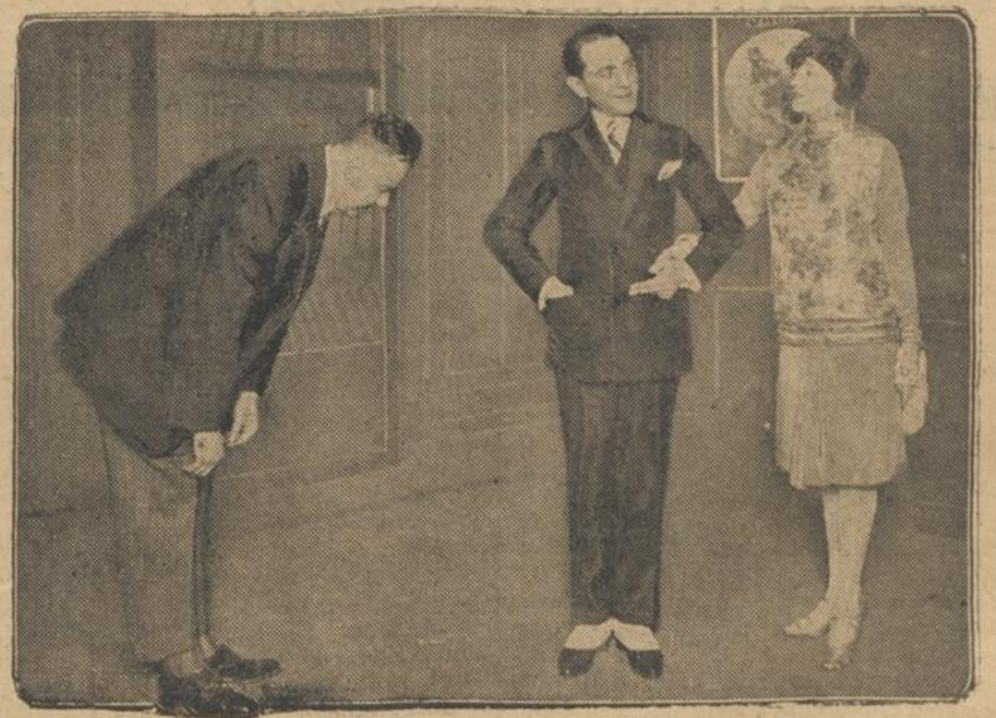
Brandt (right) in the comedy "Zijne Hoogheid De Prins" in 1928.

On 12 February 1929, Pütz married baker Karl Ludwig Wilhelm Brandt (1884–1949), taking his surname. With him, she had two children: Marie Louise (Loek) (1932–2019) and a son (1935). After the marriage, she temporarily stopped acting to help out in his bakery, which was short-staffed.

In 1929, Brandt traveled to Bad Godesberg near Bonn to meet writer Adolf von Hatzfeld. She stayed at Rheinhotel Dreesen, where Adolf Hitler, a frequent guest, gave a presentation about his party's program to Von Hatzfeld and others. Brandt asked him about the role of women in his envisioned state, to which Hitler responded that women had yet to earn their place in his state.

During this time, she met Public Prosecutor Johan van Thiel, with whom she was rumored to have been romantically involved. He was head of the intelligence apparatus in the arrondissement of Amsterdam. Brandt performed tasks for this network. She wrote the play The Public Prosecutor (Dutch: De officier van Justitie), supposedly based on her experiences with Van Thiel. The play was performed once in 1931. She later wrote two more plays, Becoming mother (Dutch: Moeder worden) (1933) and Madame Polenska (1936).

=== Espionage ===
In the 1930s, she reportedly worked on behalf of the intelligence service of the Rijksrecherche and GS III. She traveled to Germany for this purpose and gathered information on the Dutch National Socialist Movement (NSB). She maintained contacts with Dutch Minister of Justice Carel Goseling and German General Eduard Wagner.

From 1939, Brandt also worked for the German Sicherheitsdienst. That year, she opened the "Paneelclub" in the Hirschgebouw, which both the German and Dutch governments had funded. In March 1940, she was arrested by the Gestapo during a visit to Germany, suspected of treason. Months later, she was released after promising not to contact Dutch agents or the Abwehr. By then, the Netherlands had been occupied by Germany, and the "Paneelclub" was closed.

In the Netherlands, she resumed her intelligence activities. She wrote a series of radio plays for the radio, in which she encoded messages for the Dutch government in London in consultation with Van Thiel. However, these were never broadcast.

In October 1941, she was again arrested by the Germans. Although they could not prove treason, she was still transferred to Ravensbrück concentration camp in April 1942. In Ravensbrück, she rose to the position of nurse and block elder. Accounts of her behavior there vary. Some survivors praised her helpfulness and care, while others accused her of blackmail, abuse, and betrayal.

After liberation, the women of Ravensbrück, including Brandt, were transferred to Sweden by the Red Cross to recuperate. Brandt was briefly interned there due to negative stories about her time in Ravensbrück. Due to lack of evidence, she was released and returned to the Netherlands.

=== Post-war ===
After the war, she worked – without an official position – for the Bureau Nationale Veiligheid, interrogating war criminals. Among them were Karl Eberhard Schöngarth, Willy Lages, and Pieter Menten.

Brandt allegedly sold compromising dossiers to Menten, allowing him to avoid long imprisonment. Among these was said to be the Stadtholder-letter, in which Prince Bernhard allegedly offered to assume the position of stadtholder to govern the Netherlands on behalf of Hitler. Brandt claimed to have obtained this letter through Goseling. The existence of the Stadhoudersbrief has never been proven and has always been denied by Bernhard.

In the 1950s, her health deteriorated. She suffered from schizophrenia and became an alcoholic. In 1952, Brandt moved to the Limburg village of Ubach over Worms. There, she took over a café with a swimming pool. She incurred debts, had aggressive outbursts, and resumed smuggling. In October 1955, she was admitted to a psychiatric hospital in Venray for one and a half years. In 1967, she moved back to Amsterdam.

On 27 January 1978, Brandt died in Amsterdam. Het Vrije Volk wrote later that year: "Shortly afterwards, many in the country breathed a sigh of relief that the lips of Leonie Brandt-Pütz were sealed forever".

== Legacy ==
In 2003, Gerard Aalders published the book Leonie, het intrigerende leven van een Nederlandse dubbelspionne about Brandt. Brandt's son had filed an injunction demanding that, among other things, his mother's name not be used. The provisional judge dismissed the claim, as it was 'not plausible' that Aalders had not worked scientifically, or that the book was untrue or unnecessarily offensive. The book was reissued by Just Publishers in 2019. A year later, the documentary Leonie, actrice, spionne by Annette Apon, based on Aalders' book, was released.

Since 2022, the dossier of the Domestic Security Service (BVD) on Brandt has been available for inspection at the National Archive. One of the four folders is missing, the one covering the period before 1948. The missing folder is marked "Reference=C (Pr. B. espionage)". The dossier was presumably never transferred by the BVD's successor, the AIVD, and that service has also been unable to locate it.
