= Matt Bulman =

English footballer (born 1986)

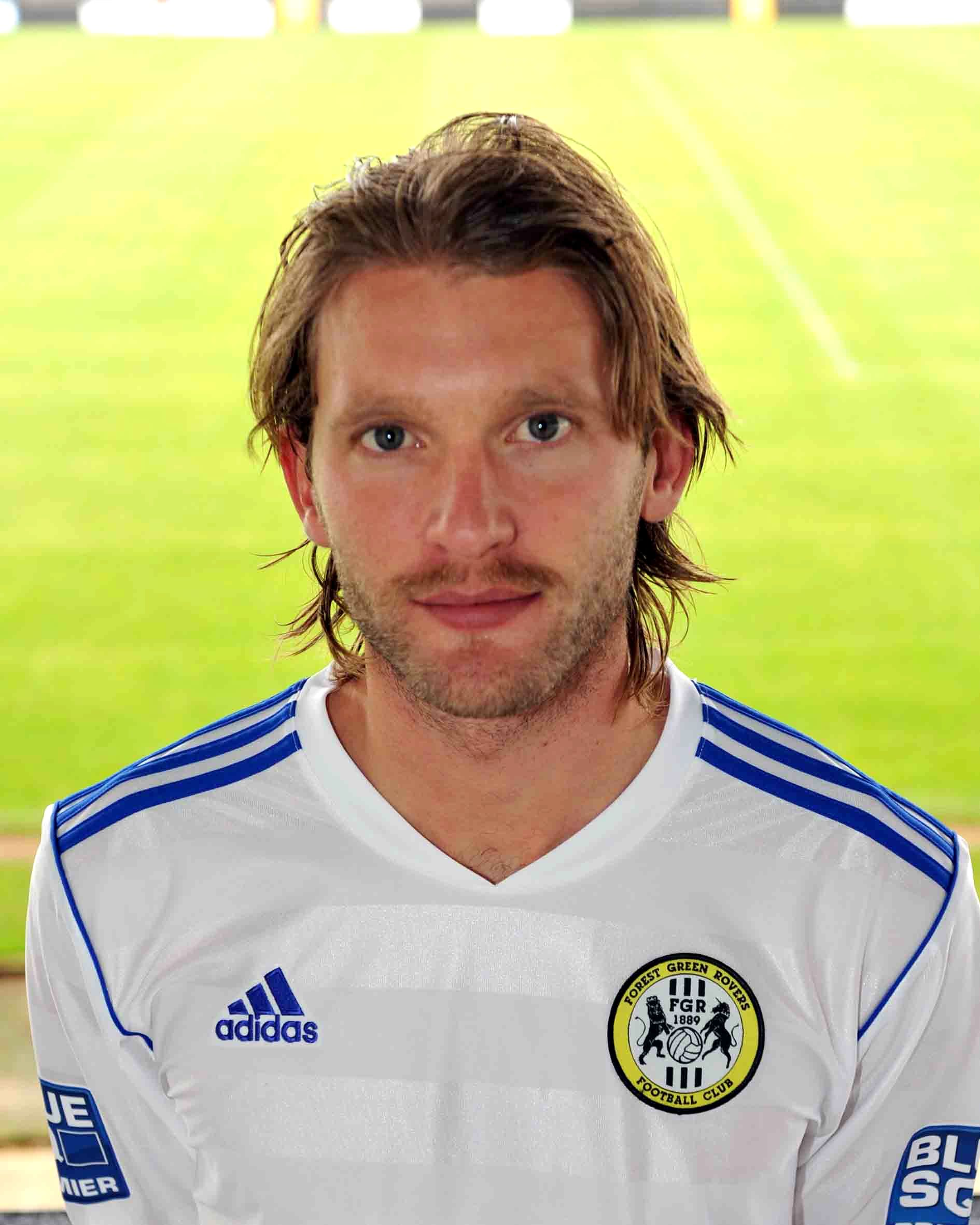
- Bulman with Forest Green Rovers.

Personal information
- Full name: Matthew Kenneth Bulman
- Date of birth: 12 June 1986 (age 40)
- Place of birth: Bristol, England
- Position: Goalkeeper

Team information
- Current team: Oxford City

Youth career
- 2004–2005: Swindon Town

Senior career*
Years	Team	Apps	(Gls)
2005–2006	Swindon Town	0	(0)
2006–2007	Salisbury City	?	(0)
2007–2008	Cirencester Town	40	(0)
2008–2010	Swindon Supermarine	81	(0)
2010–2011	Cirencester Town	35	(0)
2011–2014	Forest Green Rovers	5	(0)
2013	→ Chippenham Town (loan)	6	(0)
2014	Worcester City	0	(0)
2014	Oxford City	1	(0)
2014–2015	North Leigh	41	(0)
2015–	Swindon Supermarine	23	(0)
- * Club domestic league appearances and goals as of 22:13, 16 March 2014 (UTC)

Matthew Kenneth Bulman (born 14 October 1986) is an association footballer playing as a goalkeeper for Oxford City. He has previously played for Forest Green Rovers, Swindon Town and Salisbury City.

== Career ==
Bulman began his career in the youth system at Swindon Town, progressing into the first team where he made one senior appearance in an FA Cup tie on 16 November 2005 against Boston United, replacing the dismissed Tom Heaton and saving a penalty from Jason Lee with his first touch. He left the club in June 2006 and joined Salisbury City the following month.

After a season with Salisbury, Bulman moved on to the first of two spells at Cirencester Town. He left the club at the end of the 2007–2008 season to join Swindon Supermarine. In the summer of 2010 he returned to Cirencester Town.

In May 2011, Bulman signed for Conference National side Forest Green Rovers. He made his debut for the club on 12 August 2011 in a live televised fixture against Stockport County. In December 2012, Bulman signed a contract extension with the club. In November 2013, he joined Southern Premier Division side Chippenham Town on a month-long loan deal. He kept a clean sheet on his first appearance for the club on 9 November 2013 in a 1–0 home win over Cambridge City. On 31 January 2013, he left Forest Green after mutually agreeing to terminate his contract.

In February 2014, Bulman joined Worcester City. Just a month later however he left the club without making any appearances and joined league rivals Oxford City. He made his debut on 15 March 2014 in a 2–1 defeat against Boston United.
