= Reginald Robotham =

English cricketer

Personal information
- Full name: Reginald Robotham
- Born: 14 July 1911; Bidford-on-Avon, Warwickshire, England
- Died: 31 January 1978 (aged 66); Hastings, Sussex, England
- Batting: Right-handed
- Role: Wicket-keeper

Domestic team information
- Years: Team
- 1946: Sussex

Career statistics
Competition	First-class
Matches	1
Runs scored	31
Batting average	15.50
100s/50s	0/0
Top score	21
Catches/stumpings	1/–
- Source: Cricinfo, 13 March 2012

Reginald Robotham (14 July 1911 – 31 January 1978) was an English cricketer. Robotham was a right-handed batsman who fielded as a wicket-keeper. He was born at Bidford-on-Avon, Warwickshire.

Robotham made a single first-class cricket appearance for Sussex County Cricket Club against MCC at the Central Recreation Ground, Hastings, in 1946. Robotham scored 21 runs before being dismissed by Tony Mallett in Sussex's first innings and 10 runs in they second before he was dismissed by Jim Sims.

He died at Hastings, Sussex, on 31 January 1978.
