= Harry Allen (Australian footballer) =

Australian rules footballer

Personal information
- Full name: Harold Henry Joseph Allen
- Born: 21 May 1890; Inverleigh, Victoria
- Died: 20 January 1978 (aged 87); Geelong, Victoria
- Original team: Inverleigh
- Height: 168 cm (5 ft 6 in)
- Weight: 64 kg (141 lb)

Playing career^{1}
| Years | Club | Games (Goals) |
| 1914–15, 1919 | Geelong | 20 (6) |
- ^{1} Playing statistics correct to the end of 1919.

Harold Henry Joseph Allen (21 May 1890 – 20 January 1978) was an Australian rules footballer who played with Geelong in the Victorian Football League (VFL).
