= David Millard (cricketer) =

South African cricketer (1931–1978)

Personal information
- Full name: David Edward Shaxson Millard
- Born: 3 April 1931; Rondebosch, Cape Province, South Africa
- Died: 30 January 1978 (aged 46); Cape Town, Cape Province, South Africa
- Batting: Right-handed
- Bowling: Right-arm off break

Domestic team information
- Years: Team
- 1951/52–1954/55: Western Province
- 1952/53–1953/54: Eastern Province
- 1965: Oxford University

Career statistics
Competition	First-class
Matches	14
Runs scored	497
Batting average	20.70
100s/50s	0/5
Top score	73
Balls bowled	1,326
Wickets	15
Bowling average	29.86
5 wickets in innings	1
10 wickets in match	0
Best bowling	6/68
Catches/stumpings	4/–
- Source: Cricinfo, 4 July 2020

David Edward Shaxson Millard (3 April 1931 – 30 January 1978) was a South African first-class cricketer.

Millard was born at Rondebosch in April 1931. He made his debut in first-class cricket for Western Province in the 1951/52 Currie Cup. The following season he began playing first-class cricket for Eastern Province, playing domestic cricket in South Africa until the 1954/55 season. He played eight first-class matches for Eastern Province, scoring 374 runs and making five half-centuries, in addition to taking 15 wickets with his right-arm off break bowling, taking one five wicket haul and claiming best figures of 6 for 68. His four matches for Western Province resulted in 118 runs and a single half-century score of 62.

Having attended university in South Africa, Millard proceeded to study in England at the University of Cambridge, where he played rugby union for Cambridge University, gaining a blue. He later enrolled as a mature student at Worcester College, Oxford. While studying at Oxford, Millard played two first-class matches for Oxford University in 1965 against Middlesex and Nottinghamshire. After completing his studies at Oxford, he returned to South Africa. Millard died at Cape Town on 30 January 1978, having committed suicide by shooting himself in the head.
