= Association for Canadian and Québec Literatures =

- Abbreviation: ACQL
- Type: Organizations based in Canada
- Legal status: active
- Purpose: advocate and public voice, educator and network for Canadian and Québec Literatures
- Headquarters: Ottawa, Ontario, Canada
- Region served: Canada
- Official language: English, French
- President: Catherine Khordoc Associate Professor Department of French Carleton University
- Website: http://www.alcq-acql.ca/

The Association for Canadian and Québec Literatures (ACQL) is a learned society that supports research about Canadian and Québec literatures. Every year, the ACQL holds a conference with other scholarly groups during the Congress of the Canadian Federation for the Humanities and Social Sciences (the "Learneds").

== Prizes ==
The ACQL awards three juried prizes for the best book-length studies in Canadian and Québec literary criticism, one in English and one in French. The ACQL awards the Gabrielle Roy Prize for literary criticism on Canadian and Québec topics in Canada. ACQL awards an annual prize for the best paper presented at the annual conference by a graduate student or postdoctoral researcher.

== Communications ==
The ACQL publishes an annual newsletter and an annual members' directory.

== See also ==
- List of learned societies
- Canadian Federation for the Humanities and Social Sciences
