= Hilmi Abu Shaban =

Palestinian poet and writer

Hilmi Misbah Hafiz Abu Shaban
- Born: 1912; Zaytun Quarter
- Died: January 11, 1978 (aged 66–67); Gaza
- Occupations: writer; civil servant; banker; politician
- Writing career
- Language: Arabic

Hilmi Misbah Hafiz Abu Shaban (1911 – January 11, 1978) (Arabic: حلمي مصباح حافظ أبو شعبان), was a Palestinian poet and writer.

== Biography ==
Abu Shaban studied at Masjid al-Ajami in Gaza City, Rashidiya School, and the Arab College in Jerusalem.

Abu Shaban began his professional life in the late 1920s as an editor at the newspaper Sawt al-Haq, owned by lawyer Fahmi al-Husseini. Hilmi wrote his first articles condemning the British Mandate for Palestine and the Balfour Declaration. In 1930, he worked as a clerk in the Gaza Municipality, then as secretary and treasurer in 1934.

During the 1930s, Abu Shaban wrote a regular column in the Mir'at al-Sharq newspaper under the pseudonym 'afrit.

In 1936, he began presenting the program "Hadith al-Masaa" (Evening Talk) on Radio Palestine. In 1938, he was imprisoned for more than one year for anticolonial activities.

Abu Shaban opened a bookstore in Gaza School (now known as the Hashemite Library).

In 1943, he published a critique of Aref al-Aref's History of Gaza.

In 1946, Abu Shaban ran for municipal elections representing the Rimal district and became a member of the Gaza Municipal Council.

=== Banking career ===
In mid-1945, Abdul Hameed Shoman, the founder of the Arab Bank, came to Gaza and selected Hilmi Abu Shaaban to establish the first branch of the Arab Bank in Gaza.

After 1948, Abu Shaban maintained good relations with Egyptian administration officials due to his position as director of the Arab Bank and his membership on the municipal council. He documented his meetings with Major General Mustafa al-Sawaf, the district governor of Gaza, and Major General Abdullah Rifaat, the governor of Gaza, under the title "From Their Homes" in the Gaza newspaper.

On March 7, 1952, he was promoted and transferred to Egypt, leaving Gaza in April 1952 to assume the position of director of the Arab Bank in the city of Mahalla al-Kubra, Egypt. A few months after taking up his new post, when the July 23, 1952 revolution took place, Hilmi sent a telegram of support to Major General Muhammad Naguib, the leader of the revolution.

In 1963, Abu Shaban returned to Gaza as the manager of the Arab Bank branch, and established a new building for it, which is the current (Al-Saha Branch) building. He continued in his work until Israel's occupation of Gaza in 1967.

Hilmi Abu Shaban died in Gaza on January 11, 1978.

== Bibliography ==
- Abu Jilda, a novel (1934)

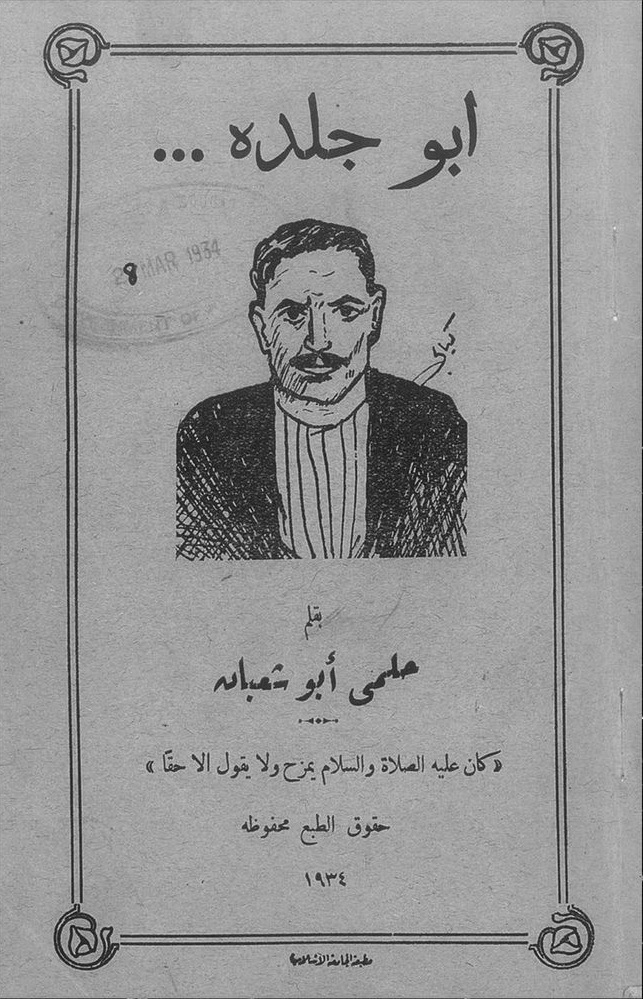
Abū Jaldat (Maṭbaʻat al-Jāmiʻah al-Islāmīyah, 1934)

- The History of Gaza: A Critique and Analysis (1943)
