= Lee Jurras =

American firearm cartridge designer (1934–2017)

Lee E. Jurras
- Born: July 27, 1934; Plant City, Florida
- Died: April 24, 2017 (aged 82); Columbus, Indiana
- Occupation: Cartridge designer

Lee E. Jurras (July 27, 1934 – April 24, 2017) was an American firearm cartridge designer, known for creation of the Super Vel line of cartridges, and groundbreaking developments in hollow-point ammunition.

Jurras began handloading cartridges for profit at age 12 and enlisted in the United States Marine Corps Reserve at age 17. In the late 1950s, he experimented with lathing rifle bullets to create jacketed handgun ammunition, inspired by Jim Harvey.

In 1963, Jurras founded Super Vel ammunition company in Shelbyville, Indiana. Jurras' ammo utilized lightweight bullets pushed at high velocities to cause bullet expansion, but at low enough pressure for typical firearms. The Super Vel line was a success, selling massive amounts of hollow-point ammunition to law enforcement and civilian buyers. However, the rapid growth of the company and its reliance on outsourcing of cartridge cases left it vulnerable. It was overtaken by competitors and closed its doors in 1974.

Jurras continued his efforts in cartridge development, using as his base the powerful AutoMag pistol, and later the Thompson Center Arms Contender pistol.

Jurras co-authored several books on firearms with George C. Nonte.

Jurras died April 24, 2017.
