= Neva Dell Hunter =

American spiritual writer (died 1978)

Neva Dell Hunter (died January 27, 1978) pioneered the practice of aura balancing, a form of spiritual therapy in which the practitioner works directly with the energy fields surrounding and penetrating the physical body.

Hunter claimed to have served as a channel (or medium) for a being who was purported to be in touch with Phineas Parkhurst Quimby, an American transcendentalist who developed a form of spiritual healing in the mid-19th century that he called the "Science of the Christ."

Hunter was the founder of the Quimby Memorial Library in Alamogordo, New Mexico. Work on the library began in 1940s during her research and travels, and the library was dedicated in 1963. Its collection included copies of Quimby's manuscripts. The library moved to Santa Fe, New Mexico and later became known as the Quimby Center. In 1976, the center was rededicated as Quimby College, with Hunter as the guest of honor. Quimby College later became Southwestern College.

Her students included Dr. Robert D. Waterman, developer of Noetic Field Balancing and founder and former president of Southwestern College; and Dr. Ron Hulnick, President of the University of Santa Monica, and co-author of "Loyalty to Your Soul" and "Remembering the Light Within." Elavivian Power, author of "The Auric Mirror"; Kirby Benson; Billy Whelan, founder of Hawaii International School Family Peace Group; UFOlogist George Hunt Williamson and many others.

Hunter performed Karmic readings for many individuals over the years, including the daughter of Beat Generation hero Neal Cassady. She was a speaker at dozens of events over her lifetime, including the first national convention of the Amalgamated Flying Saucer Clubs of America on July 11 and 12, 1959 at the Statler-Hilton Hotel in Los Angeles, California. She was the author of the book "Numerology: The Key to Self Understanding" (published in 1978 by the Quimby Metaphysical Libraries).
