= Marguerite Reuche =

French fencer

Personal information
- Born: 13 November 1900
- Died: 18 January 1978 (aged 77)

Sport
- Sport: Fencing

Marguerite Reuche (13 November 1900 – 18 January 1978) was a French fencer. She competed in the individual women's foil competition at the 1928 and 1936 Summer Olympics.
