= Donald Smith (American football coach) =

American football player and coach (born 1967)

Biographical details
- Born: October 6, 1967 (age 59)

Playing career
- 1987–1990: Western Kentucky
- Position: Running back

Coaching career (HC unless noted)
- 1991–1994: Paul Laurence Dunbar HS (KY) (assistant)
- 1995–1999: Harrodsburg HS (KY)
- 2000: Lafayette HS (KY)
- 2001–2003: Kentucky State

Head coaching record
- Overall: 13–20 (college)

Donald Wayne Smith (born October 6, 1967) is an American former football player and coach. He was the 26th head football coach at Kentucky State University in Frankfort, Kentucky, serving three seasons, from 2001 to 2003, and compiling a record of 13–20. Smith played college football at Western Kentucky University as a running back from 1987 to 1990.

Smith began his coaching career at Paul Laurence Dunbar High School in Lexington, Kentucky, where he was an assistant coach for four seasons. He then returned to his alma mater, Harrodsburg High School in Harrodsburg, Kentucky, serving as head football coach for five seasons. Smith was the head football coach at Lafayette High School in Lexington for one season, in 2000, before he was hired by Kentucky State.

== Head coaching record ==
=== College ===
Year	Team	Overall	Conference	Standing	Bowl/playoffs
Kentucky State Thorobreds (Southern Intercollegiate Athletic Conference) (2001–2003)
2001	Kentucky State	3–8	2–5	6th	
2002	Kentucky State	3–8	2–6	T–7th	
2003	Kentucky State	7–4	6–2	T–2nd	
Kentucky State:		13–20	5–3		
Total:		13–20			
