= Gerry Britt =

Australian rules footballer, born 1902

Personal information
- Full name: Gerry Britt
- Born: 23 October 1902
- Died: 22 January 1978 (aged 75)
- Original team: Williamstown
- Height: 180 cm (5 ft 11 in)
- Weight: 79 kg (174 lb)

Playing career^{1}
Years	Club	Games (Goals)
1925–27	North Melbourne	21 (10)
- ^{1} Playing statistics correct to the end of 1927.

Gerry Britt (23 October 1902 – 22 January 1978) was an Australian rules footballer who played with North Melbourne in the Victorian Football League (VFL). Britt had earlier played for North in the Victorian Football Association (VFA) before crossing to Williamstown in 1924 where he played in the VFA grand final that year against Footscray at Arden Street. Although he crossed back to North in July 1925, Britt still ran third in the VFA Recorder Cup of that season. He returned to Williamstown in 1929 and was awarded the most unselfish player trophy in 1930. Britt went to Auburn as captain-coach in 1931. He played a total of 63 games with the VFA Seagulls, kicking 26 goals.
