= Syd Hutcheson =

Australian rules footballer

Personal information
- Full name: Sydney McDonald Hutcheson
- Born: 5 October 1897; Wagga Wagga, New South Wales
- Died: 2 January 1978 (aged 80); Prahran, Victoria

Playing career^{1}
Years	Club	Games (Goals)
1920	Melbourne	11 (0)
- ^{1} Playing statistics correct to the end of 1920.

Sydney McDonald Hutcheson (5 October 1897 – 2 January 1978) was an Australian rules footballer who played with Melbourne in the Victorian Football League (VFL).
