= Jack Foster (journalist) =

American journalist

- Born: 1906; St. Joseph, Missouri
- Died: January 14, 1978 (aged 71–72)
- Occupation: Journalist
- Years active: 1921–1970
- Known for: Editor and chief executive officer of Rocky Mountain News
- Spouse: Frances Magnum

Jack Foster (1906–1978) was a prominent 20th-century journalist in the Rocky Mountain region. His career as a journalist spanned 43 years with Scripps-Howard newspapers in Cleveland, New York City, and Denver. He was the editor of the Rocky Mountain News.

== Early life and education ==
He was born in 1906 in St. Joseph, Missouri. His father, John W. Foster (died 1944), was a career-long journalist and editor for the Scripps-Howard newspapers. He worked for the Cleveland Press, Birmingham Post, and beginning in 1931 the New York World-Telegram.

== Career ==
He performed odd jobs for the newspaper as a boy, and began his career with Scripps-Howard at the age of 15, writing sports articles for the Cleveland Press. His father was editor of the paper.

When Scripps-Howard bought the Rocky Mountain News in 1926, Foster was transferred to Denver, where he worked for the paper as a reporter, feature writer, and book reviewer. Three years later, he was transferred to the New York Telegram, where he worked as the radio editor. In 1931 he was promoted to assistant city editor. He contracted tuberculosis in 1933, and was unable to resume his career until 1937, when he became a feature writer for the New York World-Telegram. He was later promoted to assistant executive editor. While at the New York World-Telegram, Foster met and married Frances Magnum, who was the paper's fashion editor.

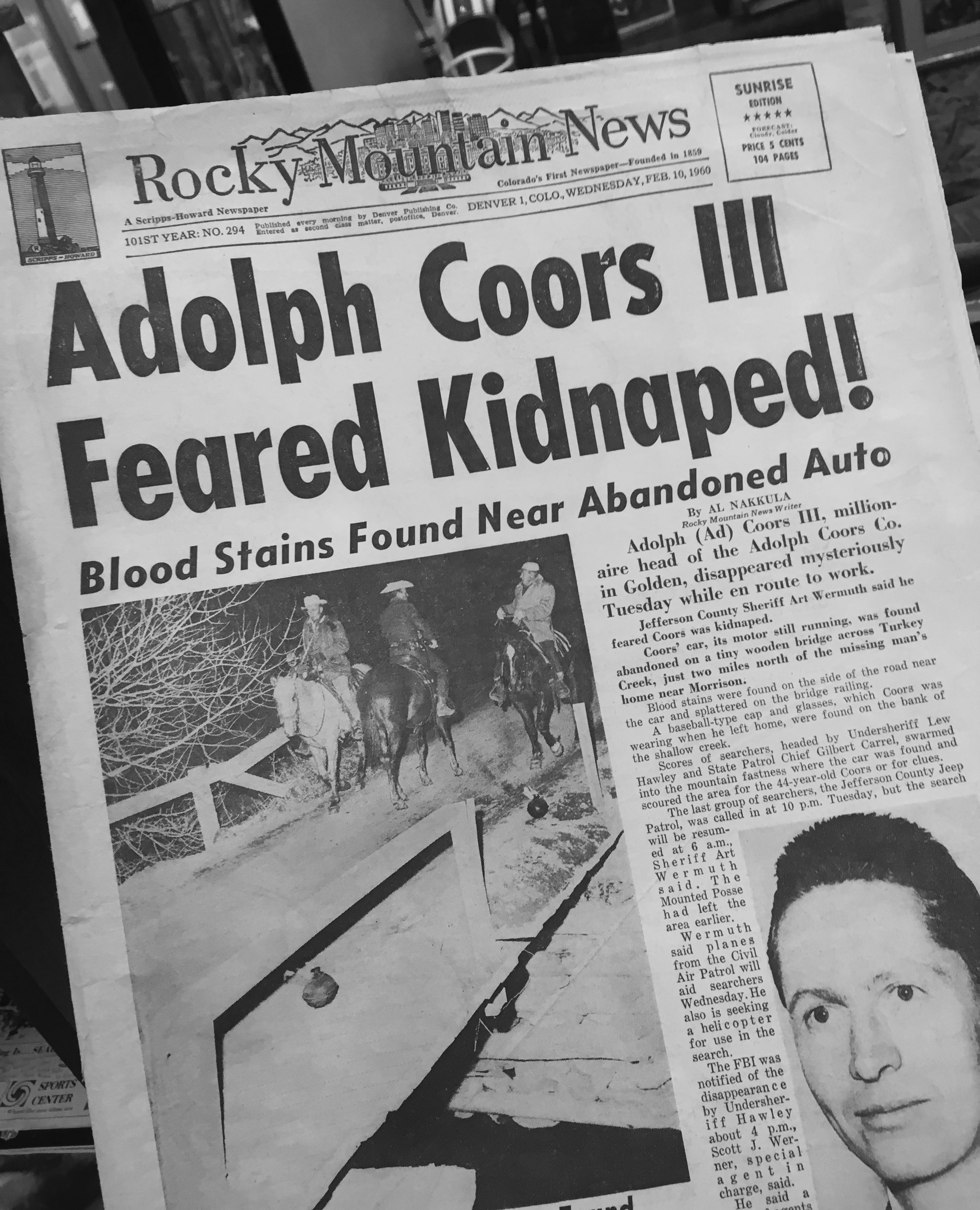
February 10, 1960 cover of the Rocky Mountain News

In 1940 the couple moved to Denver, where Foster assumed the reins of the Rocky Mountain News as editor and chief executive officer. At that time, the News faced stiff competition from its rival Denver newspaper, The Denver Post, and was in danger of losing the fight. In 1942 Foster made a bold move to save the dying paper. After convincing the president of Scripps-Howard, Roy W. Howard, of the soundness of the plan, Foster changed the format of the paper from the traditional broadside to a tabloid, magazine-style format.

The new format debuted on April 13, 1942, and is largely credited with saving the paper. At the same time, Foster introduced another novel idea, the advice column. The Molly Mayfield column was the first advice column of its kind, pre-dating Ann Landers and Dear Abby. Foster's wife Frances penned the column under the pseudonym.

Under his guidance, the News moved from a paper on the brink of closing. Foster retired from the Rocky Mountain News at the end of 1970.

== Death ==
He died January 14, 1978, at the age of 71.

His correspondence with Dwight D. Eisenhower, Richard Nixon, as well as Roy W. Howard and Jack R. Howard of Scripps-Howard News Service are held at the University of Denver.
