= Muhammad Sabry Sorboni =

Egyptian historian

Muhammad Sabry al Sorboni
- محمد صبري السوربوني
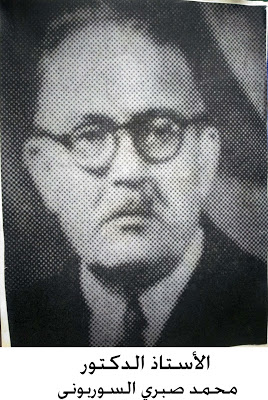
- Born: July 9, 1894; El Marg, Qalyubia Governorate, Egypt
- Died: January 18, 1978 (aged 83)
- Other name: al-Sorboni (the Sorbonnite)
- Education: Sorbonne University
- Occupations: Historian; Writer
- Known for: Documenting the Egyptian revolution of 1919
- Notable work: Poets of the Era; The Egyptian Revolution
- Office: Director of the Institute of Documents and Libraries

Muhammad Sabry al Sorboni (Arabic: محمد صبري السوربوني; July 9, 1894 - January 18, 1978) was an Egyptian historian and writer.

== Early life ==
He was born in El Marg, Qalyubia Governorate, on July 9, 1894. He memorized the Quran and learned to read and write. He then moved to Cairo to receive his primary education at the Nahhasin School, and subsequently enrolled in the Khedivial Secondary School. His interest and passion for literature and poetry caused him to fail the third year of secondary school in 1912, which led him to leave regular schooling. He preferred homeschooling, which afforded him time for his free reading and study of literature, as well as to connect with the writers of his era.

== Literary influences ==
During his studies, he became acquainted with the great writer Mustafa Lutfi al-Manfaluti, who guided him toward reading a foundational work that shaped the literary figures of his era, such as al-Barudi and Ahmed Shawqi. This work was Al-Wasila al-Adabiyya (The Literary Method).

The book compiles the lectures of Sheikh Hussein al-Marsafi, delivered to the first students of Dar al-Ulum. Al-Wasila is considered the first book to teach literature and criticism using a new approach in the 19th century, which paved the way for modern methods in the 20th century. Al Sorboni found what he was looking for in it, even stating, "Al-Wasila made all other books of rhetoric unnecessary for me."

== Early career ==
At that early age, Muhammad Sabry became acquainted with the famous poet Hafez Ibrahim, and their relationship strengthened. He also met the two Iraqi poets, Jamil Sidqi al-Zahawi and Abdul Mohsen al-Kadhimi.

This facilitated his ability to publish the first volume of his book, Poets of the Era (Shu'ara' al-'Asr), in 1910—while still a secondary school student—with an introduction by the writer Mustafa Lutfi al-Manfaluti. He followed it with a second volume in 1912, which included an introduction by the Iraqi poet Jamil Sidqi al-Zahawi. In the book, he provided biographies for a number of contemporary poets, included poems not found in their collected works, and dated each poem by its publication date.

== Higher education ==
In 1913, Muhammad Sabry successfully passed the baccalaureate exam as a private student from the Khedivial School. The following year, in 1914, he decided to travel to France to continue his university education at his own expense.

He first stayed with a French family in Lyon, where he learned and mastered the French language. He then enrolled at the Sorbonne University, earning a Bachelor of Arts in Modern History. In 1924, he obtained a Doctorat d'État (State Doctorate) in Arts from the same university. He was the first Egyptian to receive this degree, which earned him the nickname "al Sorboni" (the Sorbonnite).

== Later career ==
A noteworthy aspect of his career is that he was not appointed to a teaching position at the university, and his scholarly efforts and significant national role in preserving the nation's history and its contemporary literature were met with a lack of recognition. This was perhaps due to his self-regard and independence of opinion.

This is likely the reason he held several minor positions, the last of which, before the July Revolution, was Director of the Institute of Documents and Libraries in 1951, by a decision from Taha Hussein, the Minister of Education at the time. After the revolution, the Purge Committee decided to dismiss him from his post in December 1952 as part of a campaign to purge the government apparatus. However, the leadership soon reconsidered its skeptical stance and enlisted his help in preparing research and books on Sudan and later on the Suez Canal, for which Gamal Abdel Nasser valued his contributions.

== The revolution book ==
Al Sorboni wrote his first historical book at the request of Saad Zaghlul, while serving as secretary to the Egyptian delegation in Paris. Zaghlul had spoken of the need to rewrite modern Egyptian history in a scientific and academic manner, and urged al Sorboni to begin the work.

In response, al Sorboni authored his first book, The Egyptian Revolution Through Real Documents and Pictures Taken During the Revolution, which he wrote in French while the events of the 1919 revolution were still ongoing. In this book, al Sorboni acted more as a national advocate than a historian, with his primary focus being to inform the European public of the brutalities of British policy.

He was insistent on defining the events in Egypt as a "revolution" at a time when the international press, diplomats, and travelers were describing them as "disturbances," "unrest," or "tragic events." Al Sorboni presented it to the European public as "The Egyptian Revolution," and sought to place it on par with major world revolutions, particularly the French Revolution. Consequently, the occupying authorities banned the distribution of the book in Egypt.
