= George Nonte =

American journalist

George Charles Nonte, Jr.
- Born: February 9, 1926; Monticello, Illinois
- Died: January 1, 1978 (aged 51); Peoria, Illinois
- Occupations: Army Ordnance Corps officer; writer; editor
- Spouse: Theresa England Nonte

George Charles Nonte Jr. (February 9, 1926 – June 30, 1978) was an American expert on firearms and handloading. He was a prolific magazine writer and the author of more than 15 books.

== Life and career ==
Nonte was born in Monticello, Illinois, United States. He was the son of George C. Nonte Sr. (b. Dec. 17, 1898 d. Oct. 6, 1959). George Jr. entered the U.S. Army late in World War II and retired 20 years later, in 1964, as an Ordnance Corps Major. He was stationed in Europe, the Middle East, and in the United States. Following his retirement from the Army, he sporadically did private contract consulting work for a US government agency, throughout the 1960s and 1970s, much of it overseas. Nonte authored more than a thousand magazine articles that were published in more than a dozen outdoor and gun magazines, including The American Rifleman, Guns & Ammo, The Handloader, American Handgunner, The Rifle, Guns, and Shooting Times.

He was a recognized expert in the firearms field. In the 1950s he began a long career as a writer on handloading and guns, and was listed in the mastheads of more than ten firearms publications.

Nonte frequently gave court testimony as an expert witness on firearms.

Nonte was peripherally involved in the investigation of the assassination of John F. Kennedy. At the time or Kennedy's death, Nonte was an Ordnance Corps Captain, stationed at Fort Sill, Oklahoma. An investigative report by Ray and Mary La Fontaine, published by the Washington Post in August, 1994 mentioned Nonte, and alluded to him running guns with Jack Ruby, but provided no conclusive evidence. Reports identified Nonte as "cooperative" with the FBI in the Kennedy assassination investigation, and that he assisted the FBI with information about a renegade operation by Cuban exiles that planned to again invade Cuba, following the failed Bay of Pigs invasion. The same information was repeated in Ray and Mary La Fontaine's book Oswald Talked, published in 1996.

Nonte was a flamboyant character who in later life wore a handlebar mustache. One of his cars was a Chevrolet Corvair that was retrofitted with a powerful engine taken from a Chevrolet Corvette.

Nonte died in his office at work on June 30, 1978.

The Major George C. Nonte Award for Excellence in Firearms Journalism is awarded annually, in Nonte's memory, by American Handgunner magazine. The first recipient of the award was Massad Ayoob.

His wife was Theresa England Nonte.

One of his twin daughters, Yvette, became a US Army Intelligence officer, and retired as a full colonel.

His eldest son, David Nonte, with the assistance of Edward C. Ezell and Lee Jurras completed the draft manuscript for his final book, Combat Handguns, which was published posthumously.

== Partial bibliography ==
- Combat Handguns (co-authored with Edward C. Ezell) — March 1980 (published posthumously)
- Pistol Guide: Complete, Fully Illustrated Guide to Selecting, Shooting, Caring for and Collecting Pistols of All Types — 1980 (Published posthumously, partially compiled from other writings)
- Handgun Competition: A comprehensive sourcebook covering all aspects of modern competitive pistol and revolver shooting — July 1978
- Handloading for Handgunners — 1978
- Handgun Hunting (co-authored with Lee E. Jurras) — October 1975
- Walther P-38 Pistol Manual — 1975
- Pistol & Revolver Guide — 1975
- Home Guide to Muzzle-Loaders — 1974
- To Stop a Thief: The Complete Guide to House, Apartment and Property Protection — 1974
- Pistolsmithing — 1974 (slightly revised and reprinted in 1977 and 1981)
- Firearms Encyclopedia — various iterative editions starting in 1973
- Modern Handloading — 1972
- Complete Book of the Air Gun — 1970
- Gunsight Guide (Complete, Photographically illustrated Guide to the selection, mounting & use of sights and scopes.) — 1968
- The Home Guide to Cartridge Conversions — 1967, revised 1986
- Cartridge Conversions — 1961
