= Esther Johnson (baseball) =

American baseball player

- Pitcher
- Born: November 6, 1921; Georgetown, South Carolina, U.S.
- Died: January 6, 1978 (aged 56)

Esther Durant Johnson (November 6, 1921 – January 6, 1978) was an American pitcher who played in the All-American Girls Professional Baseball League (AAGPBL). She was born in Georgetown, South Carolina. She died in Pawleys Island, South Carolina, and is buried in All Saints Episcopal Church Cemetery.

Esther was a niece of former Major League Baseball pitcher Flint Rhem. Her mother was his sister, Laura Louise Rhem.

Esther served in the Women's Army Corps during World War II, enlisting in May 1944 and ending her service in December 1945.

According to the league's data, Esther Johnson played during the 1946 season. Nevertheless, additional information is incomplete because there are no records available at the time of the request.

The All-American Girls Professional Baseball League folded in 1954, but there is now a permanent display at the Baseball Hall of Fame and Museum at Cooperstown, New York, since November 5, 1988, that honors those who were part of the league. Esther, along with the rest of the girls and the league staff, is included at the display/exhibit.
