= Paderborn method =

Proposed method for teaching foreign languages,

The Paderborn method is a proposed method for teaching foreign languages, originally conceived for children's education. It consists of first teaching a student a simple language (usually Esperanto) for two years, then teaching them a second language for several years after that. The time spent studying Esperanto helps the student acquire the second language more quickly, such that they end up more proficient in the second language than if they had spent the first two years studying it instead of Esperanto.

The most comprehensive experiment on the Paderborn method was done by Prof. Helmar Frank, of the University of Paderborn's Institute of Pedagogic Cybernetics, from which the method gets its name.

== History of the method ==
The idea that Esperanto might prove helpful in acquiring foreign languages was posited in a 1922 report to the League of Nations. It was given as a potential reason for children to study Esperanto, but the only study that had been conducted at the time, an experiment in the Girls' Secondary School at Bishop Auckland, was inconclusive.

The educational benefits of Esperanto for children were subsequently studied by researchers at Columbia University, the University of Sheffield, and the Egerton Park Country Secondary School. Many of these experiments' findings were compromised by unclear objectives, brief or anecdotal reporting, and a lack of methodological rigor. However, they consistently suggested that the study of Esperanto provides advantages to primary-age children that the study of natural languages does not.

=== Experiment at the University of Paderborn ===
Under the supervision of Helmar Frank, a professor at the Institute of Cybernetics of Paderborn, two groups of pupils (A and B), both with German as mother tongue, were created in a primary school. The aim was to prove the propaedeutical value of Esperanto for learning English (and in general, any other foreign language).

Group A started to learn English from the third year of study, while group B in the same year started to learn Esperanto (160 hours); group B also started to learn English after two years (i.e., in the fifth year of study). Although group B studied English two years less than group A did, by the seventh year the two groups reached the same level in English, while in the eighth year of school the English level of group B was more advanced than that of group A.

The following table summarizes the Paderborn experiment:

Year of study	Group A	Group B	English knowledge
3	ENGLISH	ESPERANTO	A reaches a basic level of English, while B does not know it at all
4	ENGLISH	ESPERANTO	A reaches a basic level of English, while B does not know it at all
5	ENGLISH	ENGLISH	A continues to learn English while B starts to learn it
6	ENGLISH	ENGLISH	A continues to learn English, while B quickly improves in it
7	ENGLISH	ENGLISH	The level of English of A and B is the same
8	ENGLISH	ENGLISH	B exceeds A in English skills, even if B learnt it for 2 years less

The study demonstrated not only that group B gained linguistic skills with English, but also that group members could use two languages instead of only one. Because all the pupils had a Germanic language (German) as their mother tongue, the help they got from Esperanto was not a result of its greater similarity to English than to German. In addition to cultural gains, the saving of time and resources resulted in an educational saving as well.

=== Experiments at the University of Essex ===
Between 2006 and 2011, the Paderborn method was employed in the Springboard to Languages program, which operated at various primary schools in England. Through the program, primary school students studied Esperanto and French. The goal of the program was to boost the students' metalinguistic awareness and improve their attitudes toward language learning.

Angela Tellier and Karen Roehr-Brackin used the Springboard to Languages program to evaluate the effectiveness of the Paderborn method. They also performed three similar studies between 2013 and 2017, investigating whether learning Esperanto facilitates the development of children's metalinguistic awareness and language learning aptitude. The results showed that Esperanto was easier to learn than French for the studied children, but did not show a significant difference in the metalinguistic awareness or proficiency in subsequent language learning between students who had studied Esperanto and students who had studied other languages. However, the experiments did consistently show that the students in the Esperanto group had more uniform scores on tests of metalinguistic awareness, suggesting that studying Esperanto has a levelling effect.

== Mechanism ==
Several hypotheses have been proposed to explain how the Paderborn method works. It is generally accepted that the learning of any language makes the learning of all subsequent languages easier. Norman Williams argues that Esperanto provides this benefit to a greater degree than natural languages because of its simplicity and its familiarity to English speakers, stating that Esperanto is six times easier to learn than French or German, and that 89% of Esperanto roots are recognizably related to words in English.

Helen Eaton argues that some of Esperanto's benefit comes from the vocabulary and grammar that it shares with the target language. Lexical analyses have found that 80% of Esperanto roots are similar to the corresponding Latin root, 20% to the corresponding German, and 66% to the corresponding Italian. Eaton also notes that Esperanto grammar has noun-adjective agreement and an accusative case, which are also found in the grammars of French, German, and Latin.

Angela Tellier argues that a key factor is the positive attitude toward language learning that Esperanto provides students. Experiments consistently suggest that a student of Esperanto can reach proficiency faster than a student of a natural language. This rapid progress reinforces the student's self-confidence as a language learner and their enthusiasm for language learning, both of which encourage them to persevere in their future language learning endeavors.

== See also ==
- Psychopedagogy
