= Hirata Hide =

Japanese politician

- 平田 ヒデ

Member of the House of Representatives
- In office 27 February 1955 – 25 April 1958
- Preceded by: Kiroku Kanke
- Succeeded by: Kiroku Kanke
- Constituency: Fukushima 2nd

Personal details
- Born: Hirata Nihei; 23 June 1902; Fukushima Prefecture, Japan
- Died: 4 January 1978 (aged 75)
- Political party: Socialist
- Relatives: Sōya Fukuoka (son-in-law)
- Education: Nara Women's Higher Normal School

Hirata Hide (平田 ヒデ, Hirata Hide; 23 June 1902 – 4 January 1978) was a Japanese educator and politician who was a member of the House of Representatives.

== Biography ==
Hide Hirata, whose maiden name was Nihei, was born on 23 June 1902 in Fukushima Prefecture. She graduated from the Fukushima Prefecture Normal School's first department in 1922, and from the Nara Women's Higher Normal School Housework Department in 1926.

In March 1926, she became a teacher at Fukushima Prefectural Soma East High School. After then, she worked as a teacher at Iwate Prefectural Morioka Second High School and Kaohsiung Municipal Kaohsiung Girls' Senior High School.

After the end of World War II, in 1947 she was commissioned by the Wakamatsu City Board of Education and Research and the Fukushima Prefectural Board of Education's Wakamatsu District Council. In July 1948, she became the Child Welfare Manager in charge of the Wakamatsu area. She was an attempted candidate from the Fukushima 2nd district for the Socialist Party in the 1953 Japanese general election. She later won in the 1955 Japanese general election and served one term in the House of Representatives, serving as the head of the Education Policy Committee and as her party's Social Security Policy Chair.

Hirata was a counselor and mediator at the Fukushima Family Court, a director of the Aizu Children's Garden, a director of the Women's Issues Study Group, and a civil mediator at the Shibuya Summary Court.

Hirata died on 4 January 1978.
