= Archie Bell (footballer) =

Scottish footballer

Personal information
- Date of birth: 12 April 1965 (age 61)
- Place of birth: Kilmarnock, Scotland
- Position: Defender

Youth career
- Bellfield

Senior career*
Years	Team	Apps	(Gls)
1982–1987	Forfar Athletic	58	(1)
1987–1989	Kilmarnock	15	(0)
1989–1990	Hurlford United		
1990–1991	Annbank United		
1991–1995	Queen of the South	87	(4)
- Kilbirnie Ladeside
Total		160	(5)
- * Club domestic league appearances and goals

Archie Bell (born 12 April 1965) is a Scottish former professional footballer who played as a defender.

== Career ==
Born in Kilmarnock, Bell played for Bellfield, Forfar Athletic, Kilmarnock, Hurlford United, Annbank United, Queen of the South and Kilbirnie Ladeside.
