= Pieter Menten =

Dutch war criminal, art collector and businessman (1899–1987)

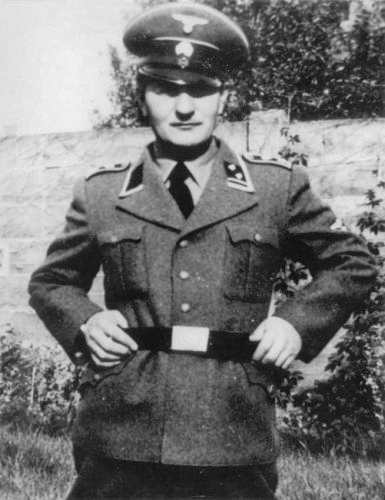
- Menten in the SS-Totenkopfverbände, 1941
- Born: 26 May 1899; Rotterdam, Netherlands
- Died: 14 November 1987 (aged 88); Loosdrecht, Netherlands
- Occupations: Art dealer, businessman
- Political party: Nazi Party (1941–1945)
- Spouses: Elisabeth Allegonda Maria van As (m. 1920; died 1952) Meta Pauw (m. 1955)

Pieter Nicolaas Menten (26 May 1899 – 14 November 1987) was a Dutch war criminal, businessman, and art collector. Menten was a Nazi collaborator who committed numerous crimes, including murder, on behalf of the regime. After World War II, he was only found guilty of working as an interpreter and served just eight months in prison. Menten lived lavishly in the Netherlands for over 25 years, often storing and selling stolen artwork, before the new evidence was used to re-try him, and he was sentenced to 10 years in prison. He was released in 1985 due to old age and good behavior, and he died in 1987.

== Background ==
Born into a wealthy Rotterdam family, Menten became interested in Poland through his father's business connections. He soon developed an extensive export trade in Dutch products to Poland. Menten moved to East Galicia in 1923 (then in Poland and later part of the Ukrainian Soviet Socialist Republic), where he became a wealthy landowner and businessman. Described as mild-mannered and quiet, he developed a deep grudge against a prominent neighboring Jewish family over a business dispute. Menten travelled back to the Netherlands in 1939, when Russia invaded eastern Poland. He was in Cracow in 1940 where he worked as a Treuhänder (Aryaniser) of a number of Jewish art dealerships.

=== Nazi collaboration ===
Menten returned to Poland in 1941 after the Nazi counter-occupation—this time as a member of the SS. Menten was involved in the massacre of Polish professors in Lviv and robbery of their property. According to witnesses, he helped shoot as many members of the offending family in Galicia as he could find, then turned on other Jews in the area. It is believed Menten personally oversaw the execution of as many as 200 Jews.

== Post-war ==
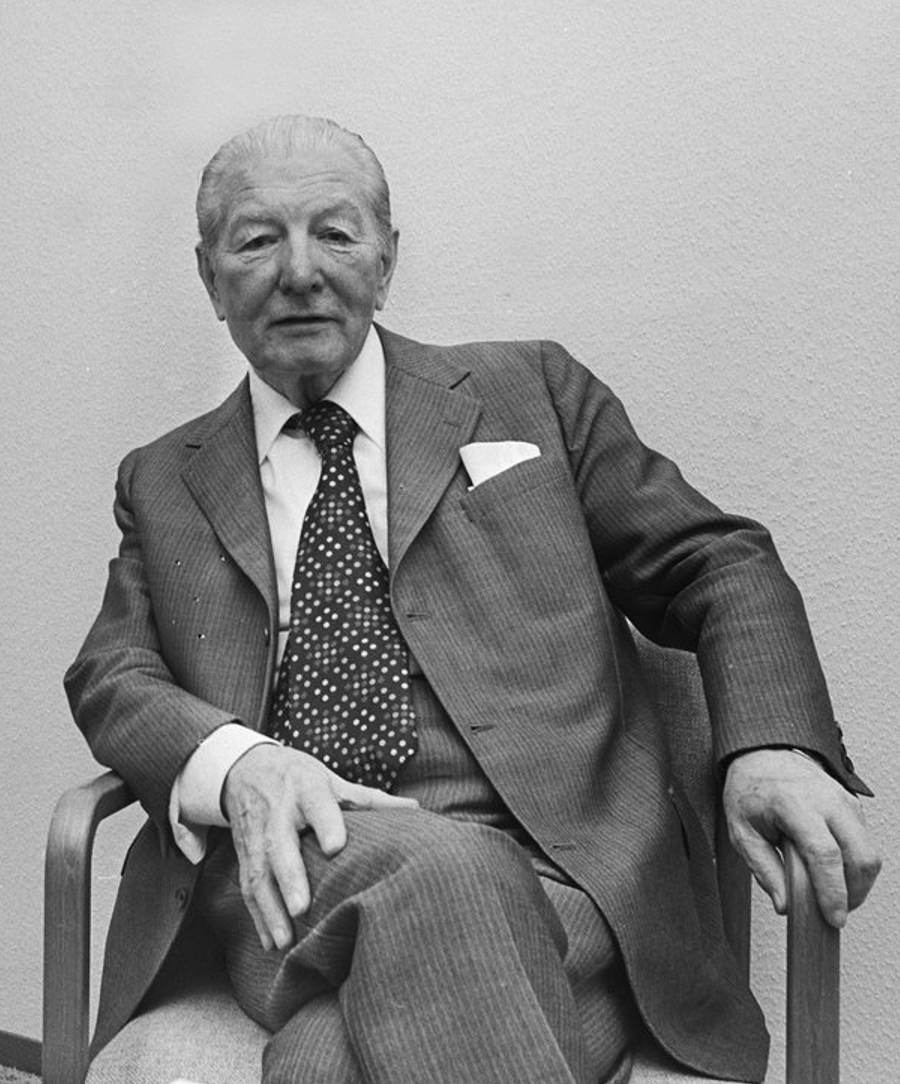
Menten during his second trial on 16 May 1977

While travelling in his personal train with his prized art collection, he was recognized by Dutch Resistance fighters. He was brought to trial. His chief defense lawyer was Rad Kortenhorst, President of the Dutch House of Representatives. The controversial trial concluded in 1949, with the prosecution unable to prove most allegations, and Menten was sentenced to an eight-month term for having worked in uniform as a Nazi interpreter. In 1951 the Dutch government refused a Polish request for Menten's extradition.

Menten would go on to become a successful art collector and businessman. His 20-room mansion was filled with valuable art work (Nicolaes Maes, Francisco Goya, Jan Sluyters, etc.) and he held vast areas of real estate.

=== Re-trial ===
In 1976, the case was reopened. During the trial, Menten's mansion was set ablaze after a survivor of Dachau concentration camp threw a petrol bomb onto its thatched roof. The building suffered extensive damage and some of the art collection was destroyed. In 1980, Menten was sentenced to 10 years in prison and was fined 100,000 guilders for war crimes, including being accessory to crimes against humanity for his role in the murder of 20 Jewish villagers in Poland in 1941.

Upon his release in 1985, he believed he would settle in his County Waterford mansion in Ireland only to find out Garret FitzGerald, Taoiseach at the time, had barred him from the country. Menten died at a senior citizen's home in Loosdrecht, Netherlands at the age of 88.

== In the popular culture ==
The TV series The Menten Files (original title "De zaak Menten") describes the trials against Pieter Menten.
