= Hector Ross (footballer) =

Australian rules footballer

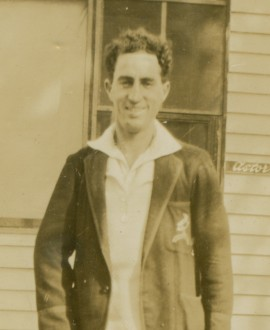

Personal information
- Full name: Hector John Ross
- Born: 28 April 1899; Fairfield, Victoria
- Died: 10 January 1978 (aged 78); Alphington, Victoria
- Original team: Northcote
- Height: 165 cm (5 ft 5 in)
- Weight: 69 kg (152 lb)

Playing career^{1}
Years	Club	Games (Goals)
1927	Collingwood	2 (0)
1928	Carlton	9 (10)
Total		11 (10)
- ^{1} Playing statistics correct to the end of 1928.

Hector John Ross (28 April 1899 – 10 January 1978) is a former Australian rules footballer who played with Carlton and Collingwood in the Victorian Football League (VFL).
