= Arch Bell =

Australian rules footballer, born 1905

Personal information
- Full name: Archibald Bell
- Born: 19 August 1905; Ballarat, Victoria
- Died: 19 January 1978 (aged 72); Geelong North, Victoria
- Original team: Geelong College

Playing career^{1}
Years	Club	Games (Goals)
1928	Geelong	1 (0)
- ^{1} Playing statistics correct to the end of 1928.

Archibald Bell (19 August 1905 – 19 January 1978) was an Australian rules footballer who played for the Geelong Football Club in the Victorian Football League (VFL).
