= Roger B. Colton =

United States Army general

Roger Baldwin Colton
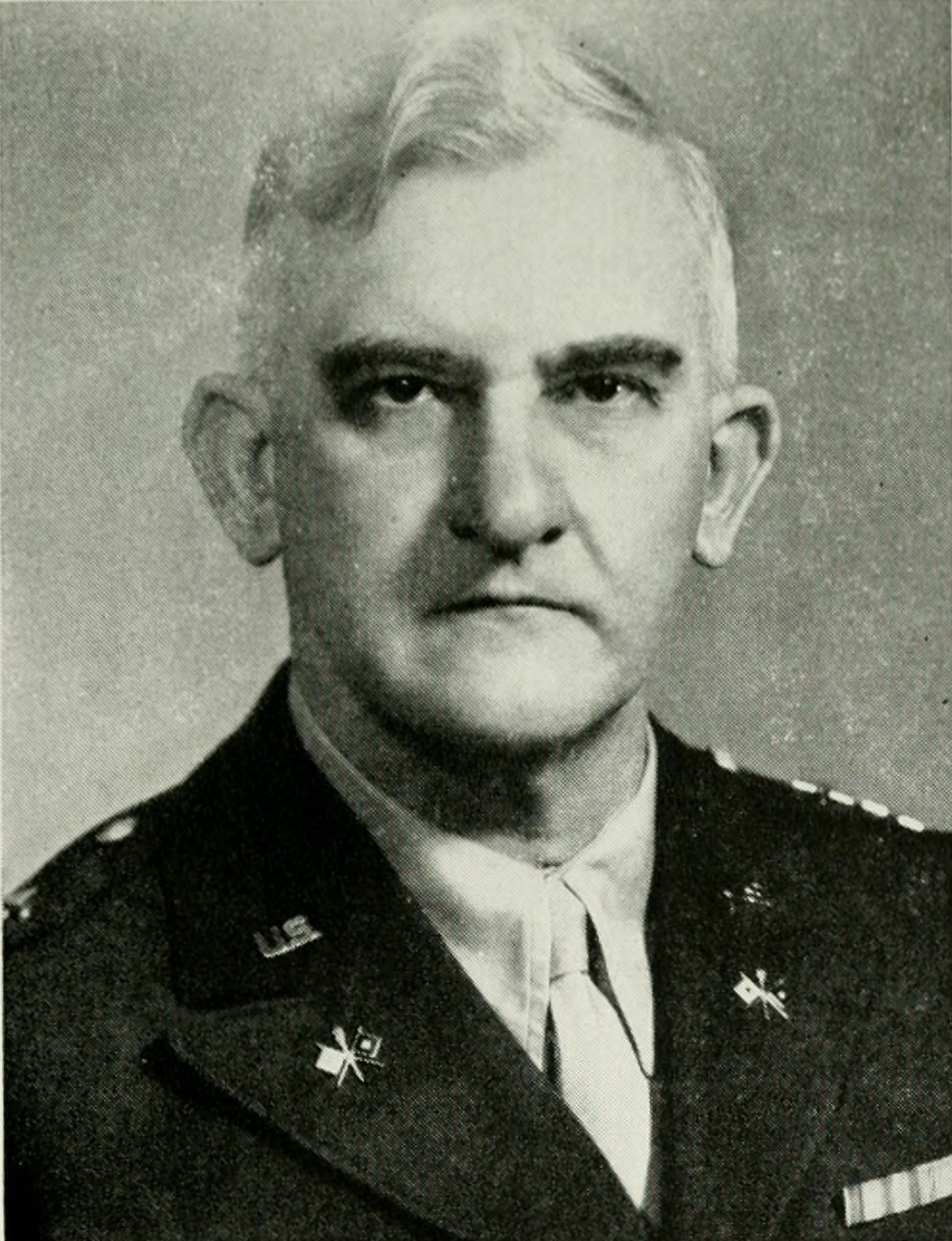
- Born: December 15, 1887
- Died: January 28, 1978 (aged 90)
- Burial place: Arlington National Cemetery
- Military career
- Allegiance: United States
- Branch: United States Army
- Rank: Major General
- Conflicts: Battle of the Kasserine Pass
- Awards: Legion of Merit, Distinguished Service Medal

Major General Roger Baldwin Colton (December 15, 1887 – January 28, 1978) was an American military officer. He served as the United States Army Air Communications Officer of Technical Services during World War II.

== Early life ==
Colton was born on December 15, 1887, in Jonesboro, Burke County, North Carolina. He was the last of the eight brothers and sisters born to his parents of Irish descent. His father died when Colton was only six; his mother died when he was 16. His cousins were already raising his brother, Henry Elliott, and they took him in after the death of his mother.

== Education ==
Colton's cousins sent him to the Taft School from which he graduated at age 19. He later attended Yale University. He graduated from Yale at the age of 22 with a Bachelor of Science degree from the Yale Sheffield School of Science and a membership in the Sigma Xi and Theta Xi honorary societies.

== Military service ==
General Dwight D. Eisenhower credited Colton for his successful re-organization of the United States Armed Forces and final defeat of the Nazis at Kasserine Pass, and the Invasion of Sicily. This would later earn him a promotion in September 1944 to Major General of the Army. He was awarded the Legion of Merit and the Distinguished Service Medal for his technical and executive skills in development and supplying of vital communications equipment despite critical shortages of materials.

== Later career ==
Following World War II, Colton joined the International Telephone & Telegraph Corporation's Federal Telephone and Radio Corporation division as a vice president. In 1950, he became president of Federal Telecommunications Laboratories, the company's research division.

== Death ==
Colton died January 24, 1978, and was buried at Arlington National Cemetery.
