= Charles Burgess (cricketer) =

English cricketer

Personal information
- Full name: Charles Thomas Burgess
- Born: 30 June 1886; Hastings, Sussex, England
- Died: 14 January 1978 (aged 91); Crediton, Devon, England
- Batting: Right-handed
- Bowling: Right-arm slow

Domestic team information
- Years: Team
- 1919: Sussex

Career statistics
Competition	First-class
Matches	1
Runs scored	3
Batting average	1.50
100s/50s	–/–
Top score	2
Balls bowled	68
Wickets	3
Bowling average	13.00
5 wickets in innings	–
10 wickets in match	–
Best bowling	3/39
Catches/stumpings	1/–
- Source: Cricinfo, 9 December 2011

Charles Thomas Burgess (30 June 1886 – 14 January 1978) was an English cricketer. Burgess was a right-handed batsman who bowled right-arm slow. He was born at Hastings, Sussex.

Burgess made a single first-class appearance for Sussex against Nottinghamshire at the County Ground, Hove in the 1919 County Championship. In Sussex's first-innings, he was dismissed for 2 runs by Benjamin Flint. Burgess took 3 wickets in Nottinghamshire's first and only innings, finishing with figures of 3/39 from eleven overs. He was dismissed for a single run in Sussex's second-innings, this time becoming one of Tom Richmond's 6 wickets. Nottinghamshire won the match by an innings and 175 runs. This was his only major appearance for Sussex.

He died at Crediton, Devon on 14 January 1978.
