= Orville Bulman =

American painter

- Born: June 6, 1904; Grand Rapids, Michigan, U.S.
- Died: January 4, 1978 (aged 73); Palm Beach, Florida, U.S.
- Education: Grand Rapids High School
- Occupation: Painter

Orville Bulman (June 6, 1904 - January 4, 1978) was an American businessman-turned-painter. He owned a gallery on Worth Avenue in Palm Beach, Florida, and he did over 2,000 paintings over the course of his career.

== Early life ==
Bulman was born on June 6, 1904, in Grand Rapids, Michigan. His father, E. O. Bulman, was the founder of the E. O. Bulman Manufacturing Company, and the inventor of household gadgets and industrial devices.

Bulman graduated from Grand Rapids High School.

== Career ==
Bulman worked as a newspaper cartoonist in Chicago for a year, only to return to Grand Rapids and work for his family businesses, the E. O. Bulman Manufacturing Company and the Bulman Corporation. He eventually served as the president of both companies.

Bulman subsequently moved to Palm Beach, Florida, where he owned a gallery on Worth Avenue via Parigi. He did many paintings of the fauna and flora of Haiti, where he had lived in the 1950s, as well as of houses and Indian women. He did over 2,000 paintings over the course of his career. Notable collectors included Mrs Harry Lynde Bradley and William B. Ruger.

== Personal life and death ==
Bulman resided on Hypoluxo Island, Palm Beach County with his wife.

Bulman died on January 4, 1978, in Palm Beach, Florida.
