= Kasten bei Böheimkirchen =

- Municipality
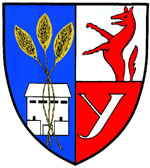
- Coat of arms

- Location within Austria
- Coordinates: 48°9′N 15°47′E
- Country: Austria
- State: Lower Austria
- District: Sankt Pölten-Land

Government
  - Mayor: Josef Denk

Area
  - Total: 20.5 km^{2} (7.9 sq mi)
- Elevation: 290 m (950 ft)

Population (2018-01-01)
  - Total: 1,409
  - Density: 68.7/km^{2} (178/sq mi)
- Time zone: UTC+1 (CET)
  - Summer (DST): UTC+2 (CEST)
- Postal code: 3072
- Area code: 02744
- Website: www.gde-kasten.at

Kasten bei Böheimkirchen is a town in the district of Sankt Pölten-Land in the Austrian state of Lower Austria.

== Population ==
Historical population
Year	Pop.	±%
1971	1,003	—
1981	928	−7.5%
1991	1,121	+20.8%
2001	1,237	+10.3%
2011	1,321	+6.8%
