= Don Smith (writer) =

Canadian writer (1909–1978)

- Born: Donald Taylor Smith; August 2, 1909; Port Colborne, Ontario, Canada
- Died: January 11, 1978 (aged 68); Paris, France
- Occupations: Journalist, novelist
- Writing career
- Genres: Detective fiction, spy fiction

Don Smith (August 2, 1909 – January 11, 1978) was a Canadian writer of detective and spy fiction. He is known for his Secret Mission series of novels, starring the businessman-turned-spy Phil Sherman.

== Early life ==
He was born Donald Taylor Smith in Port Colborne, Ontario.

From 1934 to 1939, he was a foreign correspondent for the Toronto Star in Beijing.

Smith piloted a fighter in the Royal Air Force during World War II. He was awarded the Distinguished Flying Cross for his participation in the Dieppe Raid in 1942.

After the war, he lived in Morocco and Majorca, manning different businesses before becoming a full-time writer in his 50s.

== Novels ==
Smith's first novel, Out of the Sea, an action/romance paperback original, was published in 1952 by Gold Medal Books. It was banned by the Irish Censorship Board for being "indecent or obscene".

Two 1953 snippet reviews by Anthony Boucher in The New York Times called his following book, Perilous Holiday, "a thorough lesson in Yugoslav geography but a marked failure as an Amblerian suspense novel", and dismissed his third, China Coaster, as "much duller... (with a plot that) would stop dead if the participants acted sensibly". However, brief reviews of the same two novels in the New York Herald Tribune called Perilous Holiday "considerably fresher" than China Coaster.

In 1966, he created for Gold Medal a series of novels starring Tim Parnell, a former CIA agent employed in Amsterdam as a private investigator specialized in cases involving aircraft. At least one of them, The Padrone, got a positive snippet review in the Chicago Tribune.

Some of Smith's novels have been translated to French, Italian, Dutch, and Swedish.

=== Secret Mission series ===
In 1968, Smith created a second, more popular series for Award Books, which was already well established as a publisher of spy fiction with its Nick Carter-Killmaster series. It stars Phil Sherman, an American businessman living in Paris who is regularly recruited by spy agencies to infiltrate gangs of counterfeiters, drug smugglers or arms dealers, and who goes on to become a CIA agent in the span of over twenty adventures. Most of the titles in this series begin with the words Secret Mission. The character of Phil Sherman, however, first appeared in a 1959 novel by a Duncan Tyler; it is unclear whether this was another of Smith's pen names.

Along the lines of Ian Fleming's Bond series, to which the Phil Sherman novels have been positively compared, each book features exotic locations, sophisticated venues, and no few sexual encounters. Resurging nazis are frequently the antagonists. Some reviewers praise Phil Sherman's adventures for the relative plausibility, presenting a thoughtful, careful investigator in contrast with more rash, bombastic heroes of the genre. A brief review in The New York Times described 1975's The Kremlin Plot as including "the required porno passages and sadism" in a "well-plotted action story".

In her book, The Middle East in Crime Fiction, Reeva S. Simon of the Columbia University Middle East Institute describes Smith's Phil Sherman character as "a tough-talking, independent operator who resembles a sort of Mike Hammer working international". In The Cold War File, Andy East identifies Smith as "one of the first espionage novelists to perceive (the) change in world attitudes... from the Cold War to détente".

== Bibliography ==
=== Stand-alone novels ===
- Out of the Sea (1952)
- Perilous Holiday (1953)
- China Coaster (1954)

=== Tim Parnell series ===
- The Man Who Played Thief (1969)
- The Padrone (1971)
- The Payoff (1973)
- Corsican Takeover (1974)

=== Secret Mission series (starring Phil Sherman) ===
- Red Curtain (1959, as Duncan Tyler) (unverified, see above)
- Secret Mission: Peking (1968)
- Secret Mission: Prague (1968)
- Secret Mission: Corsica (1968)
- Secret Mission: Morocco (1968)
- Secret Mission: Istanbul (1969)
- Secret Mission: Tibet (1969)
- Secret Mission: Cairo (1969)
- Secret Mission: North Korea (1969)
- Secret Mission: Angola (1969)
- Secret Mission: Munich (1969)
- Secret Mission: The Kremlin Plot (1971)
- Secret Mission: Athens (1971)
- The Marseilles Enforcer (1972)
- Death Stalk In Spain (1972)
- Haitian Vendetta (1973)
- Night Of The Assassin (1973)
- The Libyan Contract (1974)
- The Peking Connection (1975)
- The Kremlin Plot (1975)
- The Dalmatian Tapes (1976)
- " The Snatch" (1977)
- The Bavarian Connection (1978)
- The Strausser Transfer (1978)
