= 1945–46 NCAA men's basketball season =

Men's collegiate basketball season

- NCAA Tournament: 1946
- Tournament dates: March 21 – 26, 1946
- National Championship: Madison Square Garden; New York City, New York
- NCAA Champions: Oklahoma A&M Aggies
- Helms National Champions: Oklahoma A&M Aggies
- Other champions: Kentucky Wildcats (NIT)
- Player of the Year (Helms): Bob Kurland, Oklahoma A&M Aggies

The 1945–46 NCAA men's basketball season began in December 1945, progressed through the regular season and conference tournaments, and concluded with the 1946 NCAA basketball tournament championship game on March 26, 1946, at Madison Square Garden in New York, New York. The Oklahoma A&M Aggies won their second NCAA national championship with a 43–40 victory over the North Carolina Tar Heels.

== Season headlines ==
- The Middle Atlantic States Conference North began play, with five original members.
- The New England Conference disbanded at the end of the season.
- The 1946 NCAA tournament was the first NCAA tournament in which four teams (California, North Carolina, Ohio State, and Oklahoma A&M) advanced to the finals site. However, they advanced from two regional sites, so the NCAA does not consider the first "true" Final Four to have occurred until the 1952 tournament, when the four teams advanced from four separate regional sites.
- The NCAA tournament began holding a national third-place game between the teams which lost in the semifinals. The national third-place game continued through the 1981 tournament.
- Bob Kurland of Oklahoma A&M became the first player to dunk in the NCAA championship game, doing so twice late in the game on March 26.
- Oklahoma A&M defeated North Carolina 43–40 in the championship game of the 1946 NCAA tournament, becoming the first school to repeat as NCAA champion, following its tournament championship in 1945.
- Bob Kurland of Oklahoma A&M became the first two-time NCAA basketball tournament Most Outstanding Player. He previously had received the honor in 1945.
- For the first time, the NCAA tournament championship game was televised. WCBS-TV aired the game locally in New York City, with an estimated viewership of 500,000.
- In 1995, the Premo-Porretta Power Poll retroactively selected Oklahoma A&M as its top-ranked team for the 1945–46 season.

== Conference membership changes ==
School	Former conference	New conference
Bucknell Bison	Independent	Middle Atlantic States Conference North
Georgetown Hoyas	No athletic programs	Independent
Gettysburg Bullets	No NCAA basketball program	Middle Atlantic States Conference North
Lafayette Leopards	Independent	Middle Atlantic States Conference North
Lehigh Engineers	Independent	Middle Atlantic States Conference North
Muhlenberg Mules	Independent	Middle Atlantic States Conference North
Princeton Tigers	Independent	Eastern Intercollegiate Basketball League
Wichita Shockers	Independent	Missouri Valley Conference

== Regular season ==
=== Conferences ===
==== Conference winners and tournaments ====
Conference	Regular season winner	Conference player of the year	Conference tournament	Tournament venue (City)	Tournament winner
Big Six Conference	Kansas	None selected	No Tournament		
Big Ten Conference	Ohio State	None selected	No Tournament		
Border Conference	Arizona	None selected	No Tournament		
Eastern Intercollegiate Basketball League	Dartmouth	None selected	No Tournament		
Metropolitan New York Conference	NYU & St. John's		No Tournament		
Middle Atlantic States Conference North	Lafayette		No Tournament		
Missouri Valley Conference	Oklahoma A&M	None selected	No Tournament		
Mountain States (Skyline) Conference	Wyoming		No Tournament		
New England Conference	Rhode Island State		No Tournament		
Pacific Coast Conference	Idaho (North); California (South)		No Tournament; California defeated Idaho in best-of-three conference championship playoff series		
Southeastern Conference	Kentucky	None selected	1946 SEC men's basketball tournament	Jefferson County Armory, (Louisville, Kentucky)	Kentucky
Southern Conference	North Carolina	None selected	1946 Southern Conference men's basketball tournament	Thompson Gym (Raleigh, North Carolina)	Duke
Southwest Conference	Baylor	None selected	No Tournament		

==== Conference standings ====
1945–46 Big Six Conference men's basketball standings
	Conf.				Overall
Team	W		L	PCT	W		L	PCT
Kansas	10	–	0	1.000	19	–	2	.905
Oklahoma	7	–	3	.700	11	–	10	.524
Iowa State	5	–	5	.500	8	–	8	.500
Missouri	3	–	7	.300	6	–	11	.353
Nebraska	3	–	7	.300	7	–	13	.350
Kansas State	2	–	8	.200	4	–	20	.167

1945–46 Big Ten Conference men's basketball standings
	Conf.				Overall
Team	W		L	PCT	W		L	PCT
Ohio State	10	–	2	.833	16	–	5	.762
Indiana	9	–	3	.750	18	–	3	.857
Iowa	8	–	4	.667	14	–	4	.778
Northwestern	8	–	4	.667	15	–	5	.750
Illinois	7	–	5	.583	14	–	7	.667
Minnesota	7	–	5	.583	14	–	7	.667
Michigan	6	–	6	.500	12	–	7	.632
Purdue	4	–	8	.333	10	–	11	.476
Wisconsin	1	–	11	.083	4	–	17	.190
Chicago	0	–	12	.000	6	–	14	.300

1945–46 Border Conference men's basketball standings
	Conf.				Overall
Team	W		L	PCT	W		L	PCT
Arizona	13	–	2	.867	25	–	5	.833
West Texas State	9	–	2	.818	19	–	8	.704
Texas Tech	7	–	4	.636	15	–	10	.600
New Mexico	13	–	8	.619	16	–	9	.640
Arizona State–Tempe	6	–	7	.462	12	–	16	.429
Arizona State–Flagstaff	4	–	6	.400	12	–	8	.600
Texas State M&M	4	–	7	.364	4	–	11	.267
New Mexico A&M	2	–	12	.143	5	–	16	.238
Hardin–Simmons	0	–	10	.000	2	–	10	.167

1945–46 Eastern Intercollegiate Basketball League standings
	Conf.				Overall
Team	W		L	PCT	W		L	PCT
Dartmouth	7	–	1	.875	13	–	3	.813
Cornell	6	–	2	.750	12	–	5	.706
Pennsylvania	4	–	4	.500	7	–	10	.412
Columbia	3	–	5	.375	11	–	9	.550
Princeton	0	–	8	.000	7	–	12	.368

1945–46 Metropolitan New York Conference men's basketball standings
	Conf.				Overall
Team	W		L	PCT	W		L	PCT
NYU	5	–	1	.833	19	–	3	.864
St. John's	5	–	1	.833	17	–	6	.739
CCNY	4	–	1	.800	14	–	4	.778
St. Francis (NY)	3	–	2	.600	12	–	6	.667
Manhattan	2	–	4	.333	15	–	8	.652
Brooklyn	1	–	5	.167	8	–	9	.471
Fordham	0	–	6	.000	4	–	17	.190

1945–46 Middle Atlantic States Conference North men's basketball standings
	Conf.				Overall
Team	W		L	PCT	W		L	PCT
Lafayette	7	–	1	.875	17	–	3	.850
Muhlenberg	7	–	1	.875	23	–	5	.821
Gettysburg	3	–	5	.375	11	–	6	.647
Bucknell	2	–	6	.250	6	–	11	.353
Lehigh	1	–	7	.125	3	–	13	.188

1945–46 Missouri Valley Conference men's basketball standings
	Conf.				Overall
Team	W		L	PCT	W		L	PCT
Oklahoma A&M	12	–	0	1.000	31	–	2	.939
Wichita Municipal	6	–	4	.600	14	–	9	.609
Saint Louis	6	–	5	.545	13	–	11	.542
Drake	5	–	7	.417	11	–	15	.423
Washington University	3	–	6	.333	10	–	17	.370
Creighton	3	–	7	.300	9	–	10	.474
Tulsa	3	–	9	.250	6	–	12	.333

1945–46 Mountain States Conference men's basketball standings
	Conf.				Overall
Team	W		L	PCT	W		L	PCT
Wyoming	10	–	2	.833	22	–	4	.846
Colorado	9	–	3	.750	12	–	6	.667
Utah	8	–	4	.667	12	–	8	.600
Colorado State	6	–	6	.500	15	–	9	.625
BYU	6	–	6	.500	12	–	13	.480
Utah State	2	–	10	.167	7	–	12	.368
Denver	1	–	11	.083	9	–	15	.375

1945–46 New England Conference men's basketball standings
	Conf.				Overall
Team	W		L	PCT	W		L	PCT
Rhode Island State	4	–	0	1.000	21	–	3	.875
Connecticut	4	–	2	.667	11	–	6	.647
Maine	4	–	4	.500	10	–	4	.714
Northeastern	2	–	4	.333	4	–	13	.235
New Hampshire	0	–	3	.000	3	–	7	.300

1945–46 Pacific Coast Conference men's basketball standings
	Conf.				Overall
Team	W		L	PCT	W		L	PCT
North
Idaho	11	–	5	.688	23	–	11	.676
Oregon State	10	–	6	.625	13	–	11	.542
Oregon	8	–	8	.500	16	–	17	.485
Washington	6	–	10	.375	14	–	14	.500
Washington State	5	–	11	.313	16	–	13	.552
South
California †	11	–	1	.917	30	–	6	.833
USC	8	–	4	.667	14	–	7	.667
UCLA	5	–	7	.417	8	–	16	.333
Stanford	0	–	12	.000	6	–	18	.250
† Conference championship playoff series winner

1945–46 Rocky Mountain Conference men's basketball standings
	Conf.				Overall
Team	W		L	PCT	W		L	PCT
Colorado State–Greeley	7	–	1	.875	9	–	12	.429
Montana State	6	–	2	.750	17	–	10	.630
Colorado College	5	–	3	.625	8	–	4	.667
Western State (CO)	2	–	6	.250	8	–	12	.400
Colorado Mines	0	–	8	.000	3	–	11	.214

1945–46 Southeastern Conference men's basketball standings
	Conf.				Overall
Team	W		L	PCT	W		L	PCT
Kentucky †	6	–	0	1.000	28	–	2	.933
LSU	8	–	0	1.000	18	–	3	.857
Tennessee	8	–	3	.727	14	–	4	.778
Alabama	8	–	4	.667	11	–	5	.688
Auburn	7	–	6	.538	7	–	9	.438
Georgia Tech	7	–	7	.500	10	–	11	.476
Georgia	6	–	6	.500	12	–	9	.571
Tulane	4	–	5	.444	15	–	7	.682
Vanderbilt	2	–	5	.286	3	–	10	.231
Florida	2	–	6	.250	7	–	14	.333
Ole Miss	2	–	8	.200	8	–	11	.421
Mississippi State	3	–	13	.188	5	–	14	.263
† Regular-season championship and SEC Tournament winner

1945–46 Southern Conference men's basketball standings
	Conf.				Overall
Team	W		L	PCT	W		L	PCT
North Carolina	13	–	1	.929	30	–	5	.857
Duke †	12	–	2	.857	21	–	6	.778
Virginia Tech	7	–	3	.700	11	–	8	.579
Wake Forest	8	–	5	.615	12	–	6	.667
Maryland	5	–	4	.556	9	–	12	.429
William & Mary	5	–	5	.500	10	–	10	.500
Furman	4	–	4	.500	16	–	3	.842
George Washington	4	–	5	.444	7	–	8	.467
Clemson	5	–	7	.417	9	–	11	.450
North Carolina State	5	–	7	.417	6	–	12	.333
South Carolina	4	–	7	.364	9	–	11	.450
Davidson	5	–	9	.357	13	–	12	.520
Richmond	3	–	7	.300	8	–	12	.400
The Citadel	1	–	6	.143	7	–	11	.389
VMI	1	–	6	.143	1	–	10	.091
Washington and Lee	0	–	4	.000	2	–	11	.154
† Southern Conference tournament winner

1945–46 Southwest Conference men's basketball standings
	Conf.				Overall
Team	W		L	PCT	W		L	PCT
Baylor	11	–	1	.917	25	–	5	.833
Arkansas	9	–	3	.750	16	–	7	.696
Texas	7	–	5	.583	16	–	7	.696
TCU	6	–	6	.500	13	–	11	.542
Rice	5	–	7	.417	10	–	11	.476
Texas A&M	4	–	8	.333	9	–	14	.391
SMU	0	–	12	.000	7	–	16	.304

=== Major independents ===
A total of 54 college teams played as major independents. Yale (14–1) had the best winning percentage (.933) and Nevada (28–5) finished with the most wins.

1945–46 NCAA men's basketball independents standings
	Conf.				Overall
Team	W		L	PCT	W		L	PCT
Yale		–		–	14	–	1	.933
West Virginia		–		–	24	–	3	.889
Harvard		–		–	20	–	3	.870
Boston University		–		–	12	–	2	.857
Loyola (Ill.)		–		–	23	–	4	.852
Syracuse		–		–	23	–	4	.852
Nevada		–		–	28	–	5	.848
Bowling Green State		–		–	27	–	5	.844
Notre Dame		–		–	17	–	4	.810
Holy Cross		–		–	12	–	3	.800
Navy		–		–	12	–	3	.800
St. Bonaventure		–		–	12	–	3	.800
DePaul		–		–	19	–	5	.792
Louisville		–		–	22	–	6	.786
Indiana State		–		–	15	–	5	.750
Toledo		–		–	20	–	7	.741
Marshall		–		–	24	–	10	.706
Virginia		–		–	12	–	5	.706
Loyola (Md.)		–		–	18	–	8	.692
Western Michigan		–		–	15	–	7	.682
Colgate		–		–	12	–	6	.667
Saint Mary's		–		–	10	–	5	.667
Detroit		–		–	15	–	8	.652
Rutgers		–		–	13	–	7	.650
Temple		–		–	12	–	7	.632
Montana State		–		–	17	–	10	.630
Marquette		–		–	11	–	7	.611
LIU		–		–	14	–	9	.609
Valparaiso		–		–	17	–	11	.607
Army		–		–	9	–	6	.600
Butler		–		–	12	–	8	.600
Hamline		–		–	12	–	8	.600
Santa Clara		–		–	9	–	6	.600
Niagara		–		–	11	–	8	.579
Michigan State		–		–	12	–	9	.571
Georgetown		–		–	11	–	9	.550
Miami (Ohio)		–		–	10	–	9	.526
Kent State		–		–	10	–	10	.500
Pittsburgh		–		–	7	–	7	.500
Bradley		–		–	11	–	12	.478
St. Joseph's		–		–	9	–	11	.450
Montana		–		–	13	–	16	.448
Western Kentucky State		–		–	15	–	19	.441
Penn State		–		–	7	–	9	.438
Villanova		–		–	10	–	13	.435
San Francisco		–		–	9	–	12	.429
Canisius		–		–	8	–	11	.421
La Salle		–		–	9	–	14	.391
Cincinnati		–		–	8	–	13	.381
Merchant Marine		–		–	5	–	10	.333
Brown		–		–	5	–	15	.250
Boston College		–		–	3	–	11	.214
Dayton		–		–	3	–	13	.188
Xavier		–		–	3	–	16	.158

== Post-season tournaments ==
=== NCAA tournament ===
==== Semifinals & finals ====
National Semifinals
Ohio State	57
North Carolina	60^{OT}
Oklahoma A&M	52
California	35

National Finals
North Carolina	40
Oklahoma A&M	43
Third place
Ohio State	63
California	45

=== National Invitation tournament ===
==== Semifinals & finals ====
Semifinals
Rhode Island State	59
Muhlenberg	49
West Virginia	51
Kentucky	59'

Finals
Rhode Island State	45
Kentucky	46
Third place
Muhlenberg	40
West Virginia	65

== Awards ==
=== Consensus All-American teams ===
Consensus First Team
Player	Position	Class	Team
Leo Klier	F	Senior	Notre Dame
Bob Kurland	C	Senior	Oklahoma A&M
George Mikan	C	Senior	DePaul
Max Morris	F	Senior	Northwestern
Sid Tanenbaum	G	Junior	NYU

Consensus Second Team
Player	Position	Class	Team
Charles B. Black	F	Junior	Kansas
John Dillon	G	Sophomore	North Carolina
Billy Hassett	G	Senior	Notre Dame
Tony Lavelli	F	Freshman	Yale
Jack Parkinson	G	Junior	Kentucky
Ken Sailors	G	Senior	Wyoming

=== Major player of the year awards ===
- Helms Player of the Year: Bob Kurland, Oklahoma A&M

=== Other major awards ===
- NIT/Haggerty Award (Top player in New York City metro area): Sid Tanenbaum, NYU

== Coaching changes ==
A number of teams changed coaches during the season and after it ended.

Team	Former Coach	Interim Coach	New Coach	Reason
Alabama	Hank Crisp		Floyd Burdette	
Auburn	Ralph Jordan		V. J. Edney	Jordan left to coach Georgia.
Brown	Rip Engle		Weeb Ewbank	
Canisius	Art Powell		Earl Brown	
Cincinnati	Ray Farnham		John Wiethe	
The Citadel	Eugene Clark		Whitey Piro	
Clemson	Rock Norman		Banks McFadden	
Connecticut	Blair Gullion		Hugh Greer	
Cornell	Speed Wilson		Royner Greene	
Creighton	Duce Belford		Eddie Hickey	
Dartmouth	Osbore Cowles		Elmer A. Lampe	
Denver	Ken Loeffler		Ellison Ketchum	
Detroit	Lloyd Brazil		John Shada	
Drake	Vee Freen		Froddy Anderson	
Florida	Spurgeon Cherry		Sam J. McAllister	
Georgetown	Ken Engles		Elmer Ripley	Engles – the only player-coach in Georgetown men's basketball history – stepped aside at the end of the year after coaching the Hoyas for a single season as they reconstituted their basketball program with a mostly walk-on team after a two-season hiatus due to World War II, making way for Ripley to return after a three-year absence for a third stint as coach.
Georgia	Elmer A. Lampe		Ralph Jordan	Lampe left to coach Dartmouth.
Georgia Tech	Dwight Keith		Roy McArthur	
Harvard	Floyd Stahl		William Barclay	
Idaho	James A. Brown		Guy Wicks	
Indiana	Harry Good		Branch McCracken	Good left to coach Nebraska.
Indiana State	Glenn M. Curtis		John Wooden	
Kansas State	Fitz Knorr		Jack Gardner	
La Salle	Joseph Meehan		Charlie McGlone	
Lehigh	Leo Prendergast		Dan Yarbro	
Manhattan	Honey Russell		Ken Norton	
Michigan	Bennie Oosterbaan		Osborne Cowles	
Missouri	George R. Edwards		Wilbur Stalcup	
Navy	John Wilson		Ben Carnevale	
NC State	Leron Jay		Everett Case	
Nebraska	L. F. Klein		Harry Good	
New Hampshire	Henry Swasey		Ed Stanczyk	
New Mexico A&M	Kermit Laabs		Jerry Hines	
Niagara	Edward Flynn		John J. Gallagher	
North Carolina	Ben Carnevale		Tom Scott	
Northeastern	Eugene Pare		William Grinnell	
Notre Dame	Elmer Ripley		Moose Krause	
Ohio State	Harold Olsen		Tippy Dye	
Ole Miss	Buster Poole		Jim Whatley	
Pennsylvania	Rob Dougherty		Red Kellett	
Princeton	Wes Fesler		Franklin Cappon	
Purdue	Ward Lambert		Mel Taube	
Rice	Buster Brannon		Joe Davis	
San Francisco	William Bussenius		Pete Newell	
St. Bonaventure	Anselm Krieger		Harry Singleton	
Texas Tech	Polk Robison		Berl Huffman	
Toledo	Rollie Boldt		Bill Orwig	
Vanderbilt	Garland Morrow		Norm Cooper	
VMI	Jay McWilliams		Loyd Roberts	
William & Mary	Sam B. Holt		Richard F. Gallagher	
Yale	Red Rolfe		Ivy Williamson	
