= 1945–46 Kansas Jayhawks men's basketball team =

American college basketball season

1945–46 Kansas Jayhawks men's basketball

Big Six Champions
- Conference: Big Six Conference
- Record: 19–2 (10–0 Big 6)
- Head coach: Phog Allen (29th season)
- Assistant coach: John Pfitsch (1st season)
- Home arena: Hoch Auditorium

1945–46 Big Six Conference men's basketball standings
	Conf.				Overall
Team	W		L	PCT	W		L	PCT
Kansas	10	–	0	1.000	19	–	2	.905
Oklahoma	7	–	3	.700	11	–	10	.524
Iowa State	5	–	5	.500	8	–	8	.500
Missouri	3	–	7	.300	6	–	11	.353
Nebraska	3	–	7	.300	7	–	13	.350
Kansas State	2	–	8	.200	4	–	20	.167

The 1945–46 Kansas Jayhawks men's basketball team represented the University of Kansas during the 1945–46 college men's basketball season.

== Roster ==
- Wendell Clark
- Don Auten
- Eugene Barr
- Otto Schnellbacher
- Donald Frisby
- Jack Ballard
- Owen Peck
- Hoyt Baker
- Ray Evans
- Charles B. Black
- Gilbert Stramel
- Dean Corder
- George Gear
- Gustave Daum
- Maurice Martin
- Gene Petersen
- Gene Anderson

== Schedule ==
Date time, TV	Rank^{#}	Opponent^{#}	Result	Record	Site city, state
December 3*		Warrensburg	W 45–28	1-0	Hoch Auditorium; Lawrence, KS
December 7*		Olathe NAS	W 65–61	2-0	Hoch Auditorium; Lawrence, KS
December 11*		at Rockhurst	W 59–45	3-0	Municipal Auditorium; Kansas City, MO
December 14		vs. Kansas State; Sunflower Showdown	W 71–46	4-0	Municipal Auditorium; Kansas City, MO
December 15		vs. Missouri; Border War	W 59–35	5-0	Municipal Auditorium; Kansas City, MO
December 17*		Rockhurst	W 50–21	6-0	Hoch Auditorium; Lawrence, KS
December 19*		at Olathe NAS	W 52–22	7-0	Olathe, KS
December 26*		vs. Rice	W 42–34	8-0	Municipal Auditorium; Oklahoma City, OK
December 27*		vs. Oklahoma A&M	L 28–46	8-1	Municipal Auditorium; Oklahoma City, OK
December 28		vs. Oklahoma	W 53–46	9-1	Municipal Auditorium; Oklahoma City, OK
January 7		Missouri	W 48–36	10-1 (1-0)	Hoch Auditorium; Lawrence, KS
January 9		at Kansas State; Sunflower Showdown	W 39–26	11-1 (2-0)	Nichols Hall; Manhattan, KS
January 11		at Nebraska	W 56–45	12-1 (3-0)	Nebraska Coliseum; Lincoln, NE
January 18		Oklahoma	W 53–52	13-1 (4-0)	Hoch Auditorium; Lawrence, KS
January 25		at Iowa State	W 50–47	14-1 (5-0)	State Gymnasium; Ames, IA
January 29		Kansas State; Sunflower Showdown	W 68–43	15-1 (6-0)	Hoch Auditorium; Lawrence, KS
February 16		Nebraska	W 72–30	16-1 (7-0)	Hoch Auditorium; Lawrence, KS
February 22		at Missouri; Border War	W 50–34	17-1 (8-0)	Brewer Fieldhouse; Columbia, MO
February 25		Iowa State	W 69–41	18-1 (9-0)	Hoch Auditorium; Lawrence, KS
February 28		at Oklahoma	W 52–45	19-1 (10-0)	Field House; Norman, OK
March 18*		vs. Oklahoma A&M	L 38–49	19-2	Municipal Auditorium; Kansas City, MO
*Non-conference game. ^{#}Rankings from AP Poll. (#) Tournament seedings in parentheses.
