= 1945–46 William & Mary Indians men's basketball team =

American college basketball season

1945–46 William & Mary Indians men's basketball
- Conference: Southern Conference
- Record: 10–10 (5–5 SoCon)
- Head coach: Sam B. Holt (1st season)
- Home arena: Blow Gymnasium

1945–46 Southern Conference men's basketball standings
	Conf.				Overall
Team	W		L	PCT	W		L	PCT
North Carolina	13	–	1	.929	30	–	5	.857
Duke †	12	–	2	.857	21	–	6	.778
Virginia Tech	7	–	3	.700	11	–	8	.579
Wake Forest	8	–	5	.615	12	–	6	.667
Maryland	5	–	4	.556	9	–	12	.429
William & Mary	5	–	5	.500	10	–	10	.500
Furman	4	–	4	.500	16	–	3	.842
George Washington	4	–	5	.444	7	–	8	.467
Clemson	5	–	7	.417	9	–	11	.450
North Carolina State	5	–	7	.417	6	–	12	.333
South Carolina	4	–	7	.364	9	–	11	.450
Davidson	5	–	9	.357	13	–	12	.520
Richmond	3	–	7	.300	8	–	12	.400
The Citadel	1	–	6	.143	7	–	11	.389
VMI	1	–	6	.143	1	–	10	.091
Washington and Lee	0	–	4	.000	2	–	11	.154
† Southern Conference tournament winner

The 1945–46 William & Mary Indians men's basketball team represented the College of William & Mary in intercollegiate basketball during the 1945–46 NCAA men's basketball season. Under the only year of head coach Sam B. Holt (who concurrently served as the head baseball coach), the team finished the season 10–10 and 5–5 in the Southern Conference. This was the 41st season of the collegiate basketball program at William & Mary, whose nickname is now the Tribe.

The Indians finished in 6th place in the conference and qualified for the 1946 Southern Conference men's basketball tournament, hosted by North Carolina State University at the Thompson Gym in Raleigh, North Carolina, where they lost to Wake Forest in the quarterfinals.

== Schedule ==
Date time, TV	Rank^{#}	Opponent^{#}	Result	Record	Site city, state
Regular season
*		at Camp Pickett	W 43–41	1–0	Blackstone, VA
*		at Richmond Air Base	W 77–23	2–0	Richmond, VA
*		at Camp Pickett	L 50–66	2–1	Blow Gymnasium; Williamsburg, VA
		George Washington	W 45–39	3–1 (1–0)	Blow Gymnasium; Williamsburg, VA
*		at Merchant Marine	L 33–51	3–2	Kings Point, NY
*		at Fordham	W 45–37	4–2	Rose Hill Gymnasium; The Bronx, NY
		Wake Forest	L 34–36	4–3 (1–1)	Blow Gymnasium; Williamsburg, VA
*		at Little Creek	L 39–50	4–4	Virginia Beach, VA
1/19/1946		at Richmond	L 38–39	4–5 (1–2)	Millhiser Gymnasium; Richmond, VA
*		Little Creek	L 26–33	4–6	Blow Gymnasium; Williamsburg, VA
		George Washington	L 51–65	4–7 (1–3)	Blow Gymnasium; Williamsburg, VA
		at Wake Forest	L 51–59	4–8 (1–4)	Gore Gymnasium; Wake Forest, NC
2/10/1946		Richmond	W 44–40	5–8 (2–4)	Blow Gymnasium; Williamsburg, VA
*		Hampden–Sydney	W 65–38	6–8	Blow Gymnasium; Williamsburg, VA
		at VMI	W 39–28	7–8 (3–4)	Cormack Field House; Lexington, VA
		at VPI	L 45–51	7–9 (3–5)	War Memorial Gymnasium; Blacksburg, VA
2/20/1946		Maryland	W 42–36	8–9 (4–5)	Blow Gymnasium; Williamsburg, VA
		VMI	W 60–32	9–9 (5–5)	Blow Gymnasium; Williamsburg, VA
*		Randolph–Macon	W 50–39	10–9	Blow Gymnasium; Williamsburg, VA
1946 Southern Conference Tournament
2/28/1946		vs. Wake Forest; Quarterfinals	L 31–42	10–10	Thompson Gym; Raleigh, NC
*Non-conference game. ^{#}Rankings from AP Poll. (#) Tournament seedings in parentheses.
