= List of Nebraska Cornhuskers men's basketball head coaches =

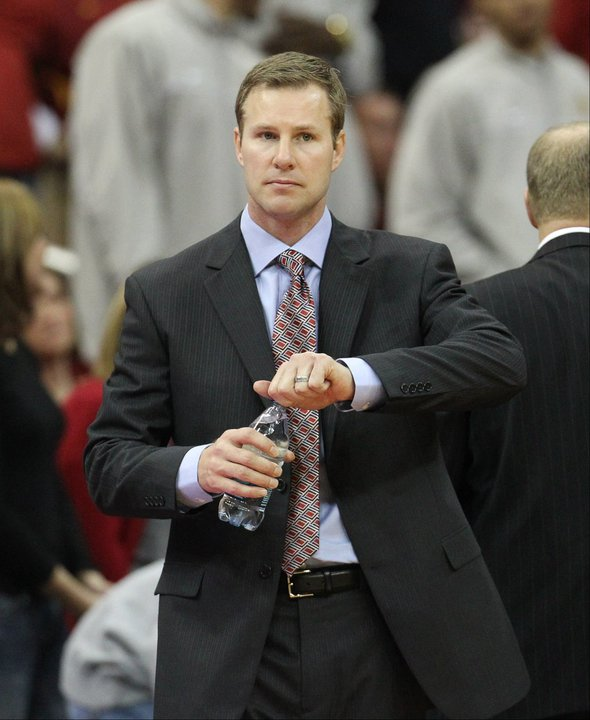
Fred Hoiberg has coached Nebraska since 2019

This list of Nebraska Cornhuskers men's basketball head coaches shows the twenty-eight coaches who have led the University of Nebraska–Lincoln's men's basketball program since its establishment in 1896. The team has been coached by Fred Hoiberg since 2019.

== History ==
After two decades of frequent turnover, Nebraska's first coaching stability came under Raymond G. Clapp and Ewald O. Stiehm. The two combined to win six of seven MVIAA North Division championships, and Stiehm holds the second-highest win percentage in school history among those to coach for multiple seasons. The program limped through World War II under multi-sport coach Adolph J. Lewandowski before hiring Harry Good from Indiana. Good's teams won a share of the MVIAA title in 1949 and 1950, Nebraska's most recent regular-season conference championships.

Assistant Moe Iba was named head coach in 1980 when Joe Cipriano retired after receiving a cancer diagnosis. Iba took Nebraska to its first NCAA Division I tournament in 1986, but much of the team's modest modern success came during the fourteen-year tenure of his successor Danny Nee. Nee led the Cornhuskers to five of their eight NCAA tournament appearances and six NIT bids, including the 1996 NIT championship, and became the program's all-time winningest head coach. Nee was fired in 2000 and Nebraska has cycled through four head coaches with little success, producing just two NCAA tournament appearances and one top-five conference finish since 2000. Fred Hoiberg, grandson of former Nebraska head coach Jerry Bush, has led the program since 2019.

== List of coaches ==
(Note: Nebraska played as an independent from 1896 until 1907, and again in 1919–20.)

Coach	Tenure	Wins	Losses	Pct.	Conf. Wins	Conf. Losses	Conf. Pct.
Frank Lehmer	1896–1899	7	3	.700			
T. P. Hewitt	1899–1900	5	0	1.000			
Elmer Berry	1900–1901	3	3	.500			
Fred Morrell	1901–1902	5	3	.625			
Walter Hiltner	1902–1903	7	5	.583			
Raymond G. Clapp	1903–1909	59	43	.578	9	7	.563
T. J. Hewiat	1909–1910	6	10	.375	6	2	.750
Osmond F. Field	1910–1911	9	9	.500	6	6	.500
Ewald O. Stiehm	1911–1915	56	14	.800	33	4	.892
Samuel C. Waugh	1915–1916	13	1	.929	12	0	1.000
E. J. Stewart	1916–1919	29	23	.558	18	19	.486
Paul J. Schissler	1919–1921	37	5	.881	9	1	.900
Owen A. Frank	1921–1923	14	21	.400	13	19	.406
William G. Kline	1923–1925	23	12	.657	21	11	.656
Ernest Bearg	1925–1926	8	10	.444	7	7	.500
Charlie T. Black	1926–1932	51	57	.472	33	37	.471
William H. Browne	1932–1940	64	87	.424	34	46	.425
Adolph J. Lewandowski	1940–1945	24	63	.276	17	33	.340
Pop Klein	1945–1946	7	13	.350	3	7	.300
Harry Good	1946–1954	86	100	.462	41	53	.436
Jerry Bush	1954–1963	81	132	.380	38	80	.322
Joe Cipriano	1963–1980	254	196	.564	126	112	.529
Moe Iba	1980–1986	106	71	.599	45	39	.536
Danny Nee	1986–2000	254	190	.572	88	116	.431
Barry Collier	2000–2006	89	91	.494	36	60	.375
Doc Sadler	2006–2012	101	89	.532	34	64	.347
Tim Miles	2012–2019	116	114	.504	52	76	.406
Fred Hoiberg	2019–present	111	114	.493	52	87	.374
