= 1946 NCAA basketball championship game =

1946 NCAA Tournament Championship Game
National championship game
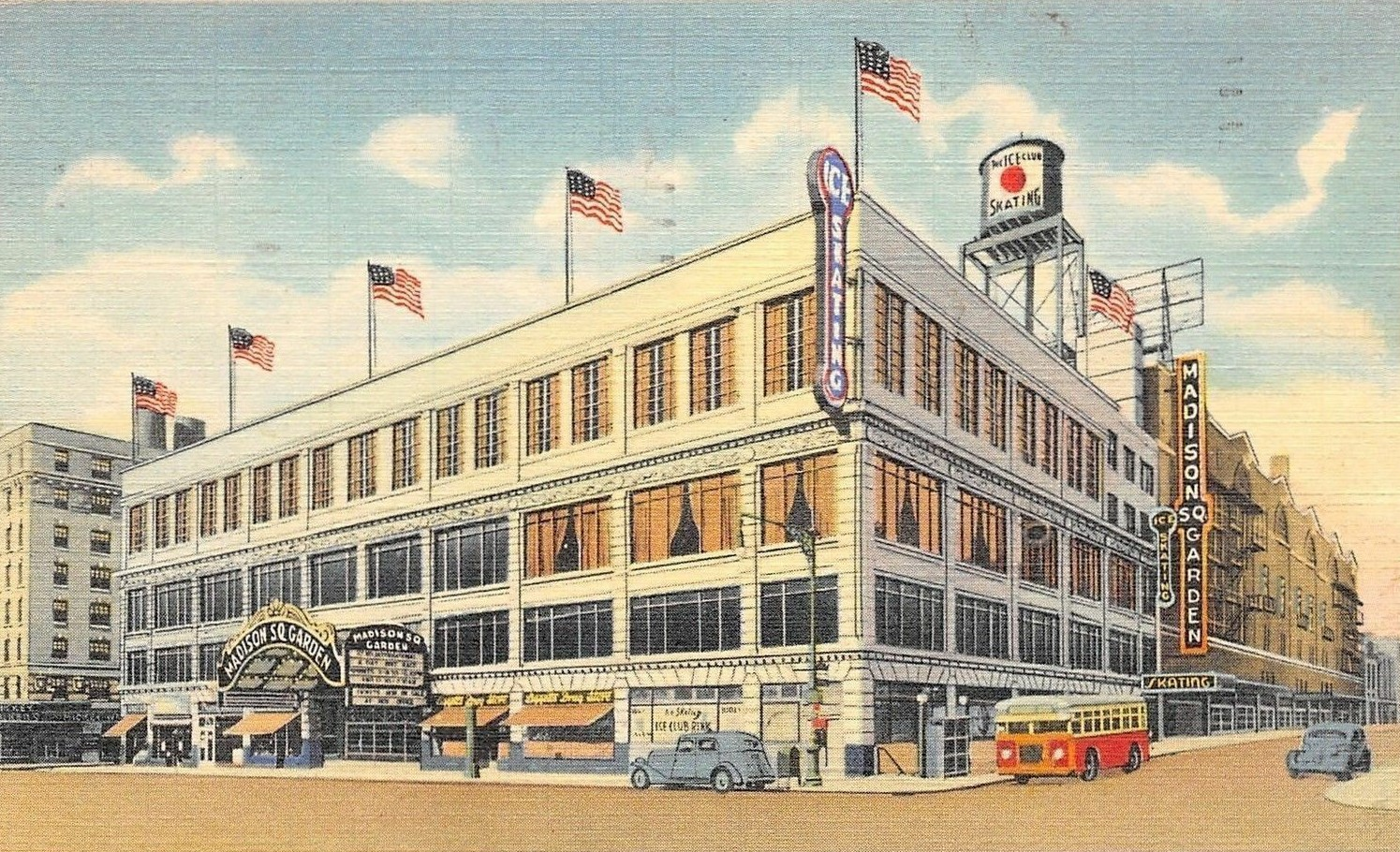
- Madison Square Garden in New York City hosted the championship game.
North Carolina Tar Heels	Oklahoma A&M Aggies
SoCon	MVC
(29-4)	(30-2)
40	43
Head coach: Ben Carnevale	Head coach: Henry Iba
	1st half	2nd half	Total
North Carolina Tar Heels	17	23	40
Oklahoma A&M Aggies	23	20	43
- Date: March 26, 1946
- Venue: Madison Square Garden, New York City, New York
- MVP: Bob Kurland, Oklahoma A&M
- Favorite: Oklahoma A&M by 8 ½
- Referees: Jocko Collins & Pat Kennedy
- Attendance: 18,479

The 1946 NCAA Men's Division I Basketball Championship Game took place on March 26, 1946, between the North Carolina Tar Heels and Oklahoma A&M Aggies at Madison Square Garden in New York City, New York. The match-up was the final one of the eighth consecutive NCAA Men's Division I Basketball Championship single-elimination tournament — commonly referred to as the NCAA Tournament — organized by the National Collegiate Athletic Association (NCAA) and is used to crown a national champion for men's basketball at the Division I level.

The Aggies won their second consecutive NCAA Men's Basketball National Championship. Bob Kurland was named the NCAA basketball tournament Most Outstanding Player for his efforts throughout the tournament, an honor which he won in the previous year's tournament.

== Background ==
=== North Carolina Tar Heels ===
The North Carolina Tar Heels, or White Phantoms, entered the season being coached by Ben Carnevale.

=== Oklahoma A&M Aggies ===
Coach Henry Iba and the Oklahoma A&M Aggies won the national championship game the previous season, where they defeated New York University by four points to claim the national title. The team returned most of the roster from the year before and the team was expected to be successful as the prior year. Sam Aubrey, a player who enlisted in 1943 and was deployed in World War II, returned to the team. Aubrey had sustained an injury during combat, but after intense rehab, he returned to the level of play he had been at before he left and was placed in the starting line up. The Aggies finished the regular season with a 28–2 record and won the Missouri Valley Conference. All five starters for the Aggies were named first team all-conference.

=== Media coverage ===
The media believed that the Aggies' chances of winning depended on the play of Bob Kurland, the nation's leading scorer. An Associated Press writer believed that if Kurland played like he had in the past eleven games, then the Aggies would be the first team to repeat as NCAA champions. Sportswriters believed that if McKinney – who was assigned to guard Kurland – could play well enough defense and Dillon make enough shots, the Tar Heels would have a chance at winning.

== Broadcast ==
This was the first NCAA Tournament to have a game televised. The game was broadcast across only the greater New York area and reached close to 500,000 people.

== Box score ==
March 26, 1946
10:15 pm EST

Oklahoma A&M Aggies 43, North Carolina Tar Heels 40
Scoring by half: 23-17, 20-23
Pts: Bob Kurland 23	Pts: John Dillon 16

Madison Square Garden, New York City, New York
Attendance: 18,479
Referees: Jocko Collins & Pat Kennedy
