= 1945–46 Ohio State Buckeyes men's basketball team =

American college basketball season

1945–46 Ohio State Buckeyes men's basketball
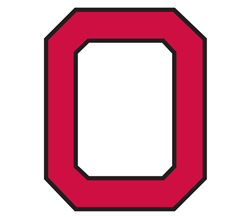

Big Ten Champions

NCAA tournament, Third Place
- Conference: Big Ten Conference
- Record: 16–5 (10–2 Big Ten)
- Head coach: Harold Olsen (24th season)
- Assistant coach: J. E. Blickle
- Home arena: Fairgrounds Coliseum

1945–46 Big Ten Conference men's basketball standings
	Conf.				Overall
Team	W		L	PCT	W		L	PCT
Ohio State	10	–	2	.833	16	–	5	.762
Indiana	9	–	3	.750	18	–	3	.857
Iowa	8	–	4	.667	14	–	4	.778
Northwestern	8	–	4	.667	15	–	5	.750
Illinois	7	–	5	.583	14	–	7	.667
Minnesota	7	–	5	.583	14	–	7	.667
Michigan	6	–	6	.500	12	–	7	.632
Purdue	4	–	8	.333	10	–	11	.476
Wisconsin	1	–	11	.083	4	–	17	.190
Chicago	0	–	12	.000	6	–	14	.300

The 1945–46 Ohio State Buckeyes men's basketball team represented Ohio State University as a member of the Big Ten Conference during the 1945–46 NCAA men's basketball season. The team's head coach was Harold Olsen and they played their home games at the Fairgrounds Coliseum. Ohio State finished Big Ten play atop the standings with a 10–2 record. The Buckeyes were one of eight teams selected to play in the NCAA tournament where they reached the fourth Final Four in program history before losing to North Carolina in the East regional final.

== Roster ==
1945–46 Ohio State Buckeyes men's basketball team
Players	Coaches
Pos. / # / Name / Height / Weight / Year / Hometown	Head coach: Harold Olsen (Wisconsin); Assistant coach(es) Legend: (C) Team captain; (S) Suspended; (I) Ineligible; (W) Walk-on; Injured; Current redshirt

== Schedule and results ==
Date time, TV	Opponent	Result	Record	Site city, state
Regular season
NCAA tournament
Mar 21, 1946*	vs. Harvard; East Regional Semifinal / National Quarterfinal – Elite Eight	W 46–38	15–4	Madison Square Garden; New York, New York
Mar 23, 1946*	vs. North Carolina; East Regional Final / National Semifinal – Final Four	L 57–60 ^{OT}	15–5	Madison Square Garden; New York, New York
Mar 26, 1946*	vs. California; National Third Place Game	W 63–45	16–5	Madison Square Garden; New York, New York
*Non-conference game. ^{#}Rankings from AP Poll. (#) Tournament seedings in parentheses. E=East.
