= 1946 NCAA basketball tournament =

Edition of USA college basketball tournament

- Teams: 8
- Finals site: Madison Square Garden, New York City, New York
- Champions: Oklahoma A&M Aggies (2nd title, 2nd title game, 2nd Final Four)
- Runner-up: North Carolina Tar Heels (1st title game, 1st Final Four)
- Semifinalists: California Golden Bears (1st Final Four); Ohio State Buckeyes (4th Final Four)
- Winning coach: Henry Iba (2nd title)
- MOP: Bob Kurland (Oklahoma A&M)
- Attendance: 73,116
- Top scorer: Bob Kurland (Oklahoma A&M) (72 points)

The 1946 NCAA basketball tournament involved eight schools playing in single-elimination play to determine the national champion of men's NCAA Division I college basketball. The 8th annual edition of the tournament began on March 21, 1946, and ended with the championship game on March 26, at Madison Square Garden in New York City. A total of 10 games were played, including a third-place game in each region and a national third-place game.

Oklahoma A&M, coached by Henry Iba, won the national title with a 43–40 victory in the final game over North Carolina, coached by Ben Carnevale. Bob Kurland of Oklahoma A&M was named the tournament's Most Outstanding Player. The Aggies were the first team to win a second NCAA championship, the first to repeat as champions, and the first of two teams (San Francisco being the other) to win the title in their first two NCAA appearances.

This was the first tournament to have four teams advance to the final site, though not the first to have a true "Final Four" format (that would not occur until 1952). The two regional losers played in the national third-place game, while the two winners played for the championship. The third-place game would continue through the 1981 tournament.

== Locations ==
The following were the sites which hosted each round of the 1946 tournament:

=== Regionals ===
March 21 and 23
East Regional, Madison Square Garden, New York, New York (Host: Metropolitan New York Conference)
March 22 and 23
West Regional, Municipal Auditorium, Kansas City, Missouri (Host: Missouri Valley Conference)

=== Championship Game ===
March 26
Madison Square Garden, New York, New York (Host: Metropolitan New York Conference)

== Teams ==
Region	Team	Coach	Conference	Finished	Final Opponent	Score
East
East	Harvard	Floyd Stahl	EIBL	Regional Fourth Place	NYU	L 67–61
East	NYU	Howard Cann	Middle Atlantic	Regional third place	Harvard	W 67–61
East	North Carolina	Ben Carnevale	Southern Conference	Runner Up	Oklahoma A&M	L 43–40
East	Ohio State	Harold Olsen	Big Ten	Third Place	California	W 63–45
West
West	Baylor	Bill Henderson	Southwest	Regional Fourth Place	Colorado	L 59–44
West	California	Nibs Price	Pacific Coast	Fourth Place	Ohio State	L 63–45
West	Colorado	Frosty Cox	Skyline	Regional third place	Baylor	W 59–44
West	Oklahoma A&M	Henry Iba	Missouri Valley	Champion	North Carolina	W 43–40

== Bracket ==
Regional Semifinals; March 21 & 22
Ohio State	46
Harvard	38
East – New York City
North Carolina	57
NYU	49
Oklahoma A&M	44
Baylor	29
West – Kansas City, MO
California	50
Colorado	44
East Third Place Game; March 23
Harvard	61
NYU	67

Regional Finals; March 23
Ohio State	57*
North Carolina	60
Oklahoma A&M	52
California	35
West Third Place Game; March 23
Baylor	44
Colorado	59

National Championship; March 26
New York City
North Carolina	40
Oklahoma A&M	43
National Third Place Game; March 26
Ohio State	63
California	45

* – Denotes overtime period

== See also ==
- 1946 NAIA Division I men's basketball tournament
- 1946 National Invitation Tournament
