= 1945–46 Georgia Bulldogs basketball team =

American college basketball season

1945–46 Georgia Bulldogs basketball
- Conference: Southeastern Conference
- Record: 12–9 (6–6 SEC)
- Head coach: Elmer A. Lampe (9th season)
- Captain: Ross Maddox
- Home arena: Woodruff Hall

1945–46 Southeastern Conference men's basketball standings
	Conf.				Overall
Team	W		L	PCT	W		L	PCT
Kentucky †	6	–	0	1.000	28	–	2	.933
LSU	8	–	0	1.000	18	–	3	.857
Tennessee	8	–	3	.727	14	–	4	.778
Alabama	8	–	4	.667	11	–	5	.688
Auburn	7	–	6	.538	7	–	9	.438
Georgia Tech	7	–	7	.500	10	–	11	.476
Georgia	6	–	6	.500	12	–	9	.571
Tulane	4	–	5	.444	15	–	7	.682
Vanderbilt	2	–	5	.286	3	–	10	.231
Florida	2	–	6	.250	7	–	14	.333
Ole Miss	2	–	8	.200	8	–	11	.421
Mississippi State	3	–	13	.188	5	–	14	.263
† Regular-season championship and SEC Tournament winner

The 1945–46 Georgia Bulldogs basketball team represented the University of Georgia as a member of the Southeastern Conference (SEC) during the 1945–46 NCAA men's basketball season. Led by Elmer A. Lampe in his ninth and final season as head coach, the Bulldogs compiled an overall record of 12–9 with a mark of 6–6 in conference play, tying for sixth place in the SEC. The team captain was Ross Maddox.

== Schedule ==
Date time, TV	Opponent	Result	Record	Site city, state
12/8/1945	Chattanooga	W 66-46	1–0	Athens, GA
12/12/1945	at Clemson	W 41-34	2–0	
1/5/1946	Auburn	W 38-37	3–0	Athens, GA
1/7/1946	Alabama	W 59-37	4–0	Athens, GA
1/12/1946	Chattanooga	W 58-36	5–0	Athens, GA
1/14/1946	at Vanderbilt	L 41-44	5–1	
1/18/1946	South Carolina	L 30-42	5–2	Athens, GA
1/21/1946	at Auburn	L 37-40	5–3	
1/22/1946	at Alabama	L 27-45	5–4	
1/26/1946	Vanderbilt	W 51-39	6–4	Athens, GA
1/27/1946	Tennessee	L 33-46	6–5	Athens, GA
2/2/1946	Florida	L 57-65	6–6	Athens, GA
2/6/1946	at Georgia Tech	W 50-40	7–6	
2/9/1946	at South Carolina	L 36-47	7–7	
2/11/1946	at Tennessee	L 28-53	7–8	
2/15/1946	Georgia Tech	W 46-43	8–8	Athens, GA
2/18/1946	at Florida	W 44-41	9–8	
2/21/1946	Clemson	W 72-51	10–8	Athens, GA
2/28/1946	Georgia Tech	W 36-30	11–8	Athens, GA
3/1/1946	Mississippi St.	W 45-44	12–8	Athens, GA
3/2/1946	LSU	L 41-60	12–9	Athens, GA
*Non-conference game. (#) Tournament seedings in parentheses.
