= 1945–46 Cincinnati Bearcats men's basketball team =

American college basketball season

1945–46 Cincinnati Bearcats men's basketball
- Conference: Independent
- Record: 8–13
- Head coach: Ray Farnham (2nd season)
- Home arena: Schmidlapp Gymnasium

The 1945–46 Cincinnati Bearcats men's basketball team represented the University of Cincinnati during the 1945–46 NCAA men's basketball season. The head coach was Ray Farnham, coaching his second season with the Bearcats. The team finished with an overall record of 8–13.

== Schedule ==
| Date time, TV | Opponent | Result | Record | Site city, state |
|---|---|---|---|---|
| December 8 | vs. Wilmington | W 30–22 | 1–0 | Schmidt Fieldhouse; Cincinnati, OH |
| December 11 | at Dayton | W 45–28 | 2–0 | Schmidlapp Gymnasium; Cincinnati, OH |
| December 15 | at Kentucky | L 31–67 | 2–1 | Alumni Gymnasium; Lexington, KY |
| December 18 | at Indiana | L 44–54 | 2–2 | The Field House; Bloomington, IN |
| January 4 | at Wayne (MI) | L 38–45 | 2–3 | |
| January 5 | at Michigan State | L 38–69 | 2–4 | Jenison Fieldhouse; East Lansing, MI |
| January 12 | at Louisville | L 40–59 | 2–5 | Jefferson County Armory; Louisville, KY |
| January 15 | at Dayton | L 37–48 | 2–6 | Montgomery County Fairgrounds; Dayton, OH |
| January 19 | Marshall | W 49–47 | 3–6 | Schmidlapp Gymnasium; Cincinnati, OH |
| January 22 | Louisville | L 39–61 | 3–7 | Schmidlapp Gymnasium; Cincinnati, OH |
| January 24 | at Wilmington | W 74–39 | 4–7 | Wilmington, OH |
| January 26 | at Ohio | L 43–46 | 4–8 | Men's Gymnasium; Athens, OH |
| January 31 | Wayne (MI) | W 58–47 | 5–8 | Schmidlapp Gymnasium; Cincinnati, OH |
| February 4 | vs. Michigan State | L 39–69 | 5–9 | Schmidt Fieldhouse; Cincinnati, OH |
| February 9 | at Miami (OH) | L 35–40 | 5–10 | Withrow Court; Oxford, OH |
| February 17 | vs. Indiana | L 22–60 | 5–11 | Schmidt Fieldhouse; Cincinnati, OH |
| February 13 | at Marshall | L 53–60 | 5–12 | Huntington, WV |
| February 16 | Ohio | L 39–45 | 5–13 | Schmidlapp Gymnasium; Cincinnati, OH |
| February 21 | Miami (OH) | W 57–36 | 6–13 | Schmidlapp Gymnasium; Cincinnati, OH |
| February 23 | Akron | W 58–40 | 7–13 | Schmidlapp Gymnasium; Cincinnati, OH |
| February 27 | at Xavier | W 53–39 | 8–13 | Schmidt Fieldhouse; Cincinnati, OH |
*Non-conference game. (#) Tournament seedings in parentheses.
