= 1945–46 Iowa State Cyclones men's basketball team =

American college basketball season

1945–46 Iowa State Cyclones men's basketball
- Conference: Big Six Conference
- Record: 8–8 (5–5 Big Six)
- Head coach: Louis Menze (18th season)
- Home arena: State Gymnasium

1945–46 Big Six Conference men's basketball standings
	Conf.				Overall
Team	W		L	PCT	W		L	PCT
Kansas	10	–	0	1.000	19	–	2	.905
Oklahoma	7	–	3	.700	11	–	10	.524
Iowa State	5	–	5	.500	8	–	8	.500
Missouri	3	–	7	.300	6	–	11	.353
Nebraska	3	–	7	.300	7	–	13	.350
Kansas State	2	–	8	.200	4	–	20	.167

The 1945–46 Iowa State Cyclones men's basketball team represented Iowa State University during the 1945–46 NCAA men's basketball season. The Cyclones were coached by Louis Menze, who was in his eighteenth season with the Cyclones. They played their home games for the last time at the State Gymnasium in Ames, Iowa.

They finished the season 8–8, 5–5 in Big Six play to finish in third place.

== Roster ==
1945–46 Iowa State Cyclones men's basketball team
Players
Coaches

Pos.	#	Name	Height	Weight	Year	Hometown
		Bernie Bobbitt	—	—
F		Jim Buck	—	—	Fr	Ames, Iowa
F		Norb Dahlke	—	—		Princeton, Wisconsin
C		Sam Deal	—	—		Amarillo, Texas
		George Duvall	—	—		Ames, Iowa
		Ev Faunce	—	—
C		Don Halverson	—	—
G		Joe Hicks	6 ft 1 in (1.85 m)	—	Sr	Wilmington, California
G		Jim Itrandles	—	—
F		Jim Jessin	—	—
F		Bob Johnson	—	—
F		Jim Kilgariff	—	—
G		Jim Miller	—	—
C		Darrell Momberg	—	—
G		Ron Norman (C)	—	—	Jr	Fairfield, Iowa
F		Norman Pedersen	—	—
G		Bob Peterson	—	—	So
G		John Pflunn	—	—		Chicago
G		Al Reynolds	6 ft 3 in (1.91 m)	—
C		Don Ricketts	—	—		Ames, Iowa
C		Dudley Ruisch	—	—		Sioux City, Iowa
F		Don Silkman	—	—
F		Jim Stark	6 ft 0 in (1.83 m)	—	Sr	Minneapolis
G		R.L. Still	—	—		Newton, Iowa
F		Leon Uknes	—	—		Sioux City, Iowa
		Bob Worthman	—	—		Madison, Wisconsin

Head coach

- Louis Menze

Assistant coach(es)

Legend

- (C) Team captain
- (S) Suspended
- (I) Ineligible
- (W) Walk-on
- Injured
- Current redshirt

== Schedule and results ==
Date time, TV	Rank^{#}	Opponent^{#}	Result	Record	Site city, state
Regular season
December 8, 1945*; 7:30 pm		Loras	W 51–35	1–0	State Gymnasium; Ames, Iowa
December 10, 1945*; 8:15 pm		at Drake; Iowa Big Four	W 46–42	2–0	Drake Fieldhouse; Des Moines, Iowa
December 15, 1945*		at Minnesota	L 33–65	2–1	Williams Arena; Minneapolis
December 20, 1945*		at Ottumwa Naval(Iowa Pre-Flight)	L 34–51	2–2	Ottumwa, Iowa
December 31, 1945*		Ottumwa Naval (Iowa Pre-Flight)	L 35–48	2–3	State Gymnasium; Ames, Iowa
January 5, 1946		at Kansas State	L 46–52 ^{OT}	2–4 (0–1)	Nichols Hall; Manhattan, Kansas
January 11, 1946		at Missouri	W 45–33	3–4 (1–1)	Brewer Fieldhouse; Columbia, Missouri
January 14, 1946; 7:30 pm		Nebraska	W 57–39	4–4 (2–1)	State Gymnasium; Ames, Iowa
January 18, 1946*; 7:30 pm		Drake; Iowa Big Four	W 58–45	5–4	State Gymnasium; Ames, Iowa
January 25, 1946; 7:30 pm		Kansas	L 47–50 ^{OT}	5–5 (2–2)	State Gymnasium; Ames, Iowa
February 2, 1946		at Oklahoma	L 43–44	5–6 (2–3)	OU Field House; Norman, Oklahoma
February 8, 1946		at Nebraska	W 57–45	6–6 (3–3)	Nebraska Coliseum; Lincoln, Nebraska
February 15, 1946; 7:30 pm		Missouri	L 36–38	6–7 (3–4)	State Gymnasium; Ames, Iowa
February 18, 1946; 7:15 pm		Kansas State	W 74–39	7–7 (4–4)	State Gymnasium; Ames, Iowa
February 23, 1946; 7:30 pm		Oklahoma	W 56–54	8–7 (5–4)	State Gymnasium; Ames, Iowa
February 25, 1946		at Kansas	L 41–69	8–8 (5–5)	Hoch Auditorium; Lawrence, Kansas
*Non-conference game. ^{#}Rankings from AP poll. (#) Tournament seedings in parentheses. All times are in Central Time.
