= 1945–46 North Carolina Tar Heels men's basketball team =

American college basketball season

1945–46 North Carolina Tar Heels men's basketball

NCAA tournament, Runner-up SoCon regular season champions

National Championship Game, L 40–43 vs. Oklahoma A&M
- Conference: Southern Conference
- Record: 30–5 (13–1 SoCon)
- Head coach: Ben Carnevale (2nd season)
- Home arena: Woollen Gymnasium

1945–46 Southern Conference men's basketball standings
	Conf.				Overall
Team	W		L	PCT	W		L	PCT
North Carolina	13	–	1	.929	30	–	5	.857
Duke †	12	–	2	.857	21	–	6	.778
Virginia Tech	7	–	3	.700	11	–	8	.579
Wake Forest	8	–	5	.615	12	–	6	.667
Maryland	5	–	4	.556	9	–	12	.429
William & Mary	5	–	5	.500	10	–	10	.500
Furman	4	–	4	.500	16	–	3	.842
George Washington	4	–	5	.444	7	–	8	.467
Clemson	5	–	7	.417	9	–	11	.450
North Carolina State	5	–	7	.417	6	–	12	.333
South Carolina	4	–	7	.364	9	–	11	.450
Davidson	5	–	9	.357	13	–	12	.520
Richmond	3	–	7	.300	8	–	12	.400
The Citadel	1	–	6	.143	7	–	11	.389
VMI	1	–	6	.143	1	–	10	.091
Washington and Lee	0	–	4	.000	2	–	11	.154
† Southern Conference tournament winner

The 1945–46 North Carolina Tar Heels men's basketball team represented the University of North Carolina at Chapel Hill as a member of the Southern Conference (SoCon) during the 1945–46 NCAA men's basketball season. The head coach was Ben Carnevale, and the team played its home games at Woollen Gymnasium in Chapel Hill, North Carolina.

North Carolina finished with a 13–1 conference record to capture the SoCon regular season title. The Tar Heels received a bid to the NCAA tournament where they made the first Final Four appearance in their program's storied history.

== Roster ==
1945–46 North Carolina Tar Heels men's basketball team
Players
Coaches

Pos.	#	Name	Height	Weight	Year	Hometown
F	3	Jim Jordan	6 ft 3 in (1.91 m)	185 lb (84 kg)	Jr	Chester, West Virginia
F	13	Hook Dillon	6 ft 3 in (1.91 m)	180 lb (82 kg)	So	Savannah, Georgia
F/C		Bones McKinney	6 ft 6 in (1.98 m)	185 lb (84 kg)	Sr	Durham, North Carolina

Head coach

- Ben Carnevale

Assistant coach(es)

Legend

- (C) Team captain
- (S) Suspended
- (I) Ineligible
- (W) Walk-on
- Injured
- Current redshirt

== Schedule and results ==
Date time, TV	Rank^{#}	Opponent^{#}	Result	Record	Site city, state
Regular season
Dec 27, 1945*		at NYU	W 43–41	6–1	Madison Square Garden; New York, New York
Feb 20, 1946*		at Catawba	W 64–38	27–2	Salisbury, North Carolina
Feb 23, 1946*		at Little Creek AB	L 46–60	27–3	Little Rock, Arkansas
SoCon tournament
Feb 28, 1946*		vs. Maryland; Quarterfinals	W 54–27	28–3	Thompson Gym; Raleigh, North Carolina
Mar 1, 1946*		vs. Wake Forest; Semifinals	L 29–31	28–4	Thompson Gym; Raleigh, North Carolina
NCAA tournament
Mar 21, 1946*		vs. NYU; East Regional Final – Elite Eight	W 57–49	29–4	Madison Square Garden; New York, New York
Mar 23, 1946*		vs. Ohio State; National Semifinal – Final Four	W 60–57 ^{OT}	30–4	Madison Square Garden; New York, New York
Mar 26, 1946*		vs. Oklahoma A&M; National Championship	L 40–43	30–5	Madison Square Garden; New York, New York
*Non-conference game. ^{#}Rankings from AP Poll. (#) Tournament seedings in parentheses.
