= 1945–46 Idaho Vandals men's basketball team =

American college basketball season

1945–46 Idaho Vandals men's basketball

Pacific Coast Conference Northern Division Champions

PCC Championship Series, L, 1–2
- Conference: Pacific Coast Conference
- Record: 23–11 (11–5 PCC)
- Head coach: James "Babe" Brown (4th season)
- Home arena: Memorial Gymnasium

1945–46 Pacific Coast Conference men's basketball standings
| | Conf. | | | | Overall |
| Team | W | | L | PCT | W | | L | PCT |
|---|---|---|---|---|---|---|---|---|
North
| Idaho | 11 | – | 5 | .688 | 23 | – | 11 | .676 |
| Oregon State | 10 | – | 6 | .625 | 13 | – | 11 | .542 |
| Oregon | 8 | – | 8 | .500 | 16 | – | 17 | .485 |
| Washington | 6 | – | 10 | .375 | 14 | – | 14 | .500 |
| Washington State | 5 | – | 11 | .313 | 16 | – | 13 | .552 |
South
| California † | 11 | – | 1 | .917 | 30 | – | 6 | .833 |
| USC | 8 | – | 4 | .667 | 14 | – | 7 | .667 |
| UCLA | 5 | – | 7 | .417 | 8 | – | 16 | .333 |
| Stanford | 0 | – | 12 | .000 | 6 | – | 18 | .250 |
† Conference championship playoff series winner

The 1945–46 Idaho Vandals men's basketball team represented the University of Idaho during the 1945–46 NCAA college basketball season. Members of the Pacific Coast Conference, the Vandals were led by fourth-year acting head coach James "Babe" Brown and played their home games on campus at Memorial Gymnasium in Moscow, Idaho.

For the first time in 23 years, the Vandals were Northern Division champions of the PCC, 22–9 overall in the regular season and 11–5 in conference play. In the last game of the regular season, the Vandals defeated Palouse neighbor Washington State by two points in Moscow, and Oregon took down runner-up Oregon State by a point in overtime on the road in Corvallis. In the four-game series with each, the Vandals split with both Oregon and Oregon State, took three from Washington, and swept Washington State.

Idaho met Southern Division champion California in the best-of-three championship series in Berkeley, lost game one in a near-riot, won game two, but lost the third.

== Postseason results ==
| Date time, TV | Opponent | Result | Record | Site (attendance) city, state |
Pacific Coast Conference Playoff Series
| Fri, March 8; 8:00 pm | at California; Game One | L 37–52 | 22–10 | Men's Gym (7,500); Berkeley, California |
| Sat, March 9; 8:00 pm | at California; Game Two | W 28–23 | 23–10 | Men's Gym (7,500); Berkeley, California |
| Mon, March 11; 8:00 pm | at California; Game Three | L 36–55 | 23–11 | Men's Gym (7,500); Berkeley, California |
*Non-conference game. (#) Tournament seedings in parentheses. All times are in Pacific time.

== Fatal accident ==
Earlier in the season on December 21, player Ronnie White (age 21) and student manager Walter Thomas (age 18) were killed in a midday automobile accident in southern Idaho near Wendell, northwest of Jerome. Also injured were players Warren Shepherd, George Weitz, and Bob Fuller, the latter two hospitalized. The five were traveling westbound in a panel truck driven by Thomas from Rupert to Boise when it collided head-on with a larger truck loaded with concrete pipe on a snow-covered curve; the other driver was not injured.

The team's outstanding player award was named for White, who previously played for Lewiston High School and North Idaho Teachers College (NITC) in Lewiston.

== Aftermath ==
Alumnus Guy Wicks returned to the university after serving in the U.S. Navy during World War II and resumed his duties as head coach in basketball (and baseball); Brown was the acting athletic director during the war and also the head football coach in 1945 and 1946.

The next title in basketball for Idaho was 35 years away, in 1981 in the Big Sky Conference.
