= Ben Carnevale =

American basketball coach (1915–2008)

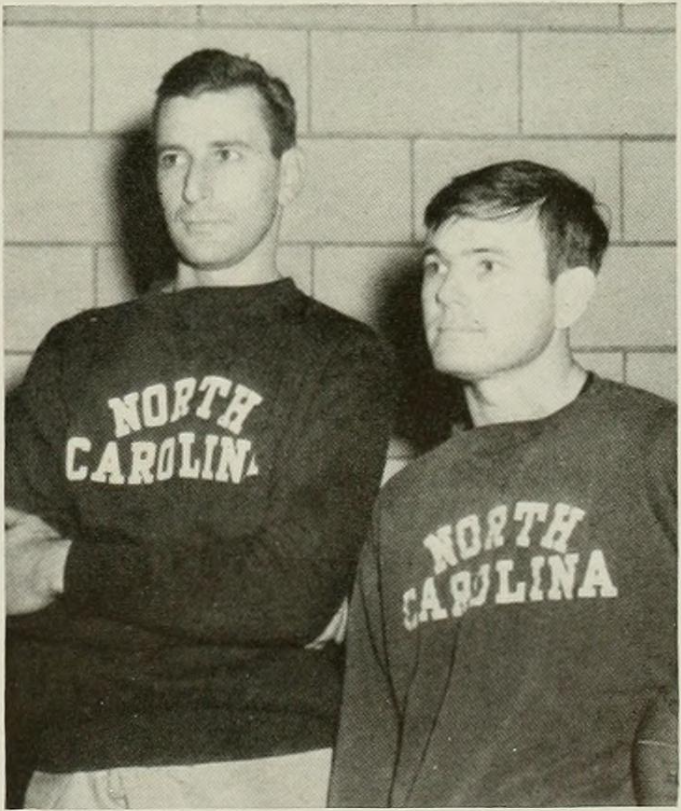
- Carnevale (left) with his assistant coach Pete Mullis during the 1944–45 season

Biographical details
- Born: October 30, 1915; Raritan, New Jersey, U.S.
- Died: March 25, 2008 (aged 92); Williamsburg, Virginia, U.S.

Playing career
- 1933–1937: NYU

Coaching career (HC unless noted)
- 1944–1946: North Carolina
- 1946–1966: Navy

Administrative career (AD unless noted)
- 1966–1972: NYU
- 1972–1981: William & Mary

Head coaching record
- Overall: 309–171

Accomplishments and honors

Championships
- SoCon tournament (1945); SoCon regular season (1946)
- Basketball Hall of Fame; Inducted in 1970
- College Basketball Hall of Fame; Inducted in 2006

Bernard Louis Carnevale (October 30, 1915 – March 25, 2008) was an American basketball coach and college athletic administrator. He served as the head basketball coach at the University of North Carolina at Chapel Hill from 1944 to 1946 and the United States Naval Academy from 1946 to 1966, compiling a career college basketball coaching record of 309–171. Carnevale was the athletic director at New York University from 1966 to 1972 and the College of William & Mary from 1972 to 1981. He was inducted into the Naismith Memorial Basketball Hall of Fame in 1970.

== Early years ==
Born in Raritan, New Jersey, Carnevale was a graduate of Somerville High School in Somerville, New Jersey. He graduated from New York University, where he was a member of the 1935 national championship team and played in the first National Invitation Tournament in 1938. While at NYU he was coached by the legendary Howard Cann. He served as a Navy officer during World War II, receiving the Purple Heart.

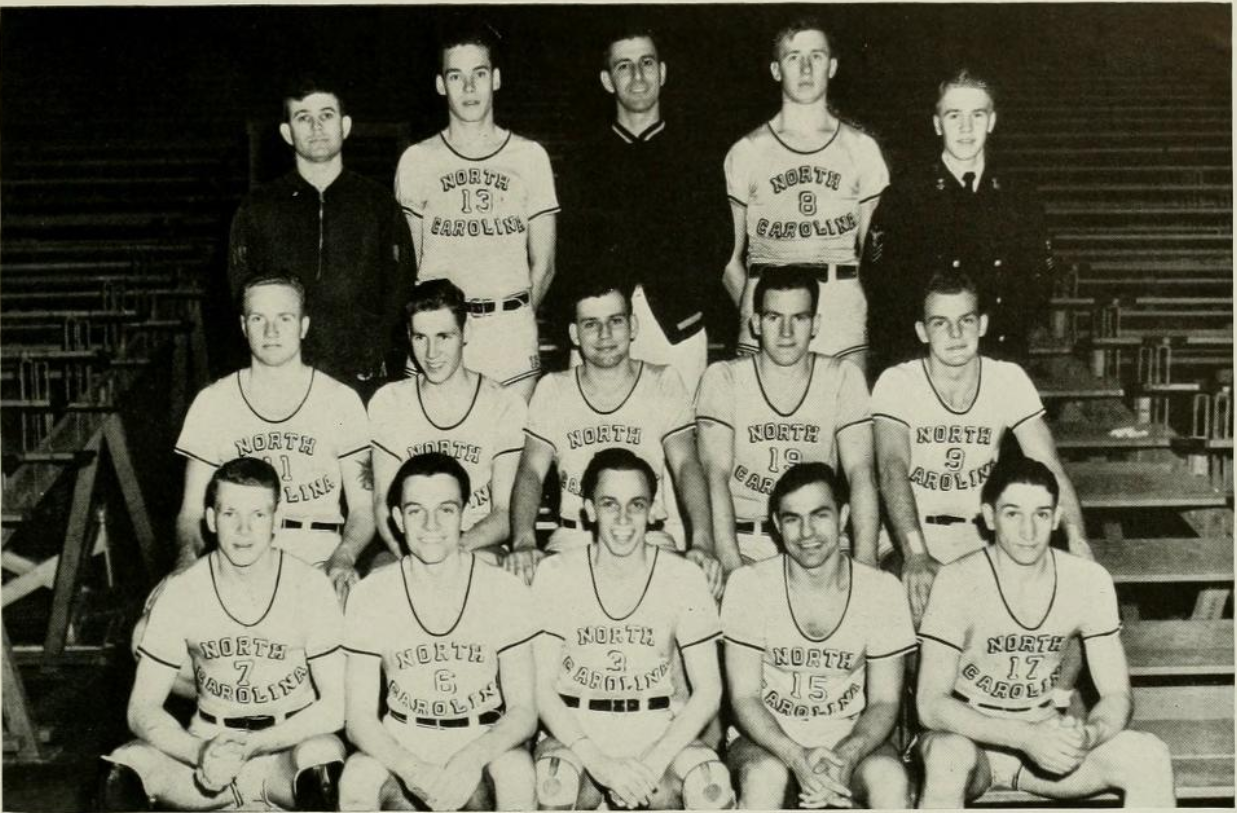
Carnevale (top row, third from left) with the 1944–45 North Carolina Tar Heels

== Career ==
Carnevale was the head basketball coach at the University of North Carolina at Chapel Hill from 1944 to 1946. While coaching at UNC, he led the team to their first appearance in the title game. The Tar Heels lost the game to Oklahoma A&M (now Oklahoma State), who won their second national crown under legendary coach Henry Iba.

Carnevale then moved to Navy between 1946 and 1966, compiling a 257–160 record despite being unable to recruit players taller than 6 ft 5 in (1.96 m); the Naval Academy has long operated with a height restriction for incoming midshipmen and did not grant waivers for taller prospective players in this era. Carnevale was inducted into the Naismith Memorial Basketball Hall of Fame in 1970.

== Personal life ==
Carnevale and his wife, Agnes Curran Carnevale, were married for 65 years and had four sons and a daughter. At the time of his death, they were living in Williamsburg, Virginia. Their son, Mark, was a professional golfer, who won five times on the PGA Tour and Nationwide Tour.

== Head coaching record ==
Record table
Season	Team	Overall	Conference	Standing	Postseason
North Carolina Tar Heels (Southern Conference) (1944–1946)
1944–45	North Carolina	22–6	11–3	4th	
1945–46	North Carolina	30–5	13–1	T–1st	NCAA Runner-up
North Carolina:		52–11	24–4		
Navy Midshipmen (NCAA University Division independent) (1946–1966)
1946–47	Navy	16–3			NCAA Quarterfinal
1947–48	Navy	10–7			
1948–49	Navy	11–10			
1949–50	Navy	14–7			
1950–51	Navy	16–6			
1951–52	Navy	16–7			
1952–53	Navy	16–5			NCAA first round
1953–54	Navy	18–8			NCAA Elite Eight
1954–55	Navy	11–9			
1955–56	Navy	10–9			
1956–57	Navy	15–8			
1957–58	Navy	10–10			
1958–59	Navy	18–6			NCAA University Division Sweet 16
1959–60	Navy	16–6			NCAA University Division First Round
1960–61	Navy	10–9			
1961–62	Navy	13–8			NIT First Round
1962–63	Navy	9–9			
1963–64	Navy	10–12			
1964–65	Navy	10–10			
1965–66	Navy	7–12			
Navy:		257–160			
Total:		309–171			
National champion Postseason invitational champion Conference regular season champion Conference regular season and conference tournament champion Division regular season champion Division regular season and conference tournament champion Conference tournament champion

== See also ==
- List of NCAA Division I Men's Final Four appearances by coach
