= 1945–46 Illinois Fighting Illini men's basketball team =

American college basketball season

1945–46 Illinois Fighting Illini men's basketball
- Conference: Big Ten Conference
- Record: 14–7 (7–5 Big Ten)
- Head coach: Douglas R. Mills (10th season)
- Assistant coaches: Howie Braun (9th season); Wally Roettger (11th season)
- MVP: Bob Doster
- Captain: Walton Kirk
- Home arena: Huff Hall

1945–46 Big Ten Conference men's basketball standings
	Conf.				Overall
Team	W		L	PCT	W		L	PCT
Ohio State	10	–	2	.833	16	–	5	.762
Indiana	9	–	3	.750	18	–	3	.857
Iowa	8	–	4	.667	14	–	4	.778
Northwestern	8	–	4	.667	15	–	5	.750
Illinois	7	–	5	.583	14	–	7	.667
Minnesota	7	–	5	.583	14	–	7	.667
Michigan	6	–	6	.500	12	–	7	.632
Purdue	4	–	8	.333	10	–	11	.476
Wisconsin	1	–	11	.083	4	–	17	.190
Chicago	0	–	12	.000	6	–	14	.300

The 1945–46 Illinois Fighting Illini men's basketball team represented the University of Illinois.

== Regular season ==
The modern era of college basketball unofficially began with the 1945–46 season and the University of Illinois was quick to offer a team that was rebuilding its post-war image to that of a contender. Future hall of fame coaches Johnny Orr and Vic Bubas left the team to join in with the war effort as did Walt Kersulis, a top 5 scorer from the previous season and Consensus First-Team All-American and team captain Walt Kirk. The addition of freshman Bob Doster and Dwight Humphrey to a lineup that included team Jack Burmaster, Robert Rowe and Walter Mroz became formidable opponents to every team they played including a no. 1 ranked DePaul. On December 29, 1945, the Fighting Illini took on George Mikan's Blue Demons, who had lost just eight games in three years, and defeated them by a score of 56–37. In the game Burmaster and Doster each scored 14 points with Mroz adding 11 in the second half. The victory proved that, even without team captain Kirk, who had gone to serve in the armed services, the young team was ready to take on all comers. The 1945 Blue Demons went on to win the 1945 National Invitation Tournament. Additionally, the 1945–46 season would be the finale for the University of Chicago as part of the Big Ten. Illinois would defeat the Maroons two times during the year, 70–28 and 85–24. Due to the departure of Chicago, the Big Ten would become the Big Nine until Michigan State joined the conference in 1950.

Mills used 31 players during the course of the season and had an overall record of 14 wins and 7 losses with a conference mark of 7 and 5, finishing in a fifth place tie in the Big Ten. The team finished with an 11–2 record at home and a road record of 3–5. Future All-American Dwight "Dike" Eddleman would appear in two games during the course of the season, as well as future North Carolina A&T Aggies, hall-of-fame men's basketball coach, Cal Irvin, would appear in one game.

=== David "Matt" Bullock ===
1946 saw the end of a 34-year career for Illini athletic trainer Matt Bullock. From 1913 to 1947 David "Matt" Bullock saw to it that football and basketball stars like Red Grange, George Halas, Buddy Young, Ray Woods, Chuck Carney, Lou Boudreau, Andy Phillip and other Fighting Illini stayed healthy. During his long career at the University of Illinois, Bullock cared for more than 40,000 athletes.

=== Roster ===
1945–46 Illinois Fighting Illini men's basketball team
Players
Coaches

Pos.	#	Name	Height	Weight	Year	Previous school	Hometown
F	7	Hal Craig	6 ft 0 in (1.83 m)	160 lb (73 kg)	Fr	Decatur High School	Decatur, Illinois
G	9	Jimmy Seyler	5 ft 11 in (1.8 m)	170 lb (77 kg)	Sr	Centralia High School	Centralia, Illinois
F	10	Jake Staab	6 ft 2 in (1.88 m)	170 lb (77 kg)	Sr	Chillicothe High School	Chillicothe, Illinois
F	11	Leo Swinford	5 ft 10 in (1.78 m)	160 lb (73 kg)	Fr	Paris High School	Paris, Illinois
G	12	Leo Gedvilas	6 ft 0 in (1.83 m)	175 lb (79 kg)	So	Hall High School	Spring Valley, Illinois
G	13	Walt Kirk (C)	6 ft 3 in (1.91 m)	175 lb (79 kg)	Jr	Mt. Vernon High School	Mt. Vernon, Illinois
G	14	Arthur Smiley	6 ft 3 in (1.91 m)	195 lb (88 kg)	Jr	Waterman High School	Waterman, Illinois
C	15	Robert Menke	6 ft 3 in (1.91 m)	185 lb (84 kg)	Fr	Elgin High School	Elgin, Illinois
F	16	Robert Doster	6 ft 0 in (1.83 m)	165 lb (75 kg)	Fr	Decatur High School	Decatur, Illinois
G	17	Joseph Rodriguez	5 ft 10 in (1.78 m)	165 lb (75 kg)	So	Niagara Falls High School	Niagara Falls, New York
G	18	Paul Eckert	6 ft 1 in (1.85 m)	180 lb (82 kg)	Fr	Herrin High School	Herrin, Illinois
C	19	Robert Rowe	6 ft 7 in (2.01 m)	195 lb (88 kg)	Fr	Warren High School	Warren, Illinois
F	20	Walter Mroz	5 ft 9 in (1.75 m)	145 lb (66 kg)	So	Chicago Public Schools	Chicago, Illinois
F	22	Dean Meador	5 ft 8 in (1.73 m)	140 lb (64 kg)	Fr	Patoka Senior High School	Patoka, Illinois
G	23	William Eddleman	6 ft 0 in (1.83 m)	170 lb (77 kg)	Sr	Anna-Jonesboro Community High School	Anna, Illinois
F	24	Van Anderson	6 ft 1 in (1.85 m)	185 lb (84 kg)	Fr	Sullivan Community High School	Sullivan, Illinois
G	26	George Leddy	6 ft 0 in (1.83 m)	165 lb (75 kg)	Fr	Chicago Public Schools	Chicago, Illinois
F	27	Ray McClure	5 ft 11 in (1.8 m)	156 lb (71 kg)	Fr	Galesburg High School	Galesburg, Illinois
F	29	Dwight Humphrey	5 ft 8 in (1.73 m)	138 lb (63 kg)	Fr	Moline High School	Moline, Illinois
C	30	Robert Jones	6 ft 3 in (1.91 m)	200 lb (91 kg)	Fr	Frankfort Community High School	West Frankfort, Illinois
C	31	William Edwards	6 ft 2 in (1.88 m)	176 lb (80 kg)	Fr	Staunton High School	Staunton, Illinois
G	33	Robert Olson	6 ft 0 in (1.83 m)	180 lb (82 kg)	Fr	St. Elmo Junior-Senior High School	St. Elmo, Illinois
G	38	Jack Burmaster	6 ft 2 in (1.88 m)	175 lb (79 kg)	So	Elgin High School	Elgin, Illinois
F	40	Dwight Eddleman	6 ft 2 in (1.88 m)	190 lb (86 kg)	So	Centralia High School	Centralia, Illinois
G	41	Jack Pierce	5 ft 10 in (1.78 m)	175 lb (79 kg)	So	Pontiac Township High School	Pontiac, Illinois
C	48	Fred Green	6 ft 7 in (2.01 m)	210 lb (95 kg)	Fr	Urbana High School	Urbana, Illinois
		Bob Dannehl	—	—	Fr	Onarga High School	Onarga, Illinois
		Cal Irvin	—	—	Fr	Orange High School	East Orange, New Jersey
		Tony Esposito	—	—	Fr	Chicago Public Schools	Chicago, Illinois
		Russell "Harold" Strange	—	—	GS	Mount Pleasant High School	Mount Pleasant, Michigan
		Al Leavitt	—	—	Fr	Chicago Public Schools	Chicago, Illinois

Head coach

- Douglas Mills (University of Illinois) (10th year)

Assistant coach(es)

- Wally Roettger (University of Illinois) (11th year)
- Howie Braun (University of Illinois) (9th year)

Legend

- (C) Team captain
- (S) Suspended
- (I) Ineligible
- (W) Walk-on
- Injured
- Current redshirt

Roster

== Schedule ==
Date time, TV	Rank^{#}	Opponent^{#}	Result	Record	Site (attendance) city, state
Non-Conference regular season
12/1/1945*		Wright Field	L 52–56	0–1	Huff Hall (4,291); Champaign, IL
12/2/1945*		St. Louis	W 54–46	1–1	Huff Hall (3,766); Champaign, IL
12/8/1945*		Naval Training Station Great Lakes	W 58–41	2–1	Huff Hall (4,995); Champaign, IL
12/8/1945*		Great Lakes Hospital	W 51–23	3–1	Huff Hall (4,995); Champaign, IL
12/11/1945*		Detroit	W 51–34	4–1	Huff Hall (4,475); Champaign, IL
Big Ten regular season
12/15/1945		Ohio State	L 46–50	4–2 (0–1)	Huff Hall (5,640); Champaign, IL
12/18/1945*		Drake	W 64–42	5–2	Huff Hall (5,640); Champaign, IL
12/20/1945*		at Nebraska	W 62–51	6–2	Nebraska Coliseum (3,000); Lincoln, NE
12/22/1945		at Iowa; Rivalry	L 39–41	6–3 (0–2)	Iowa Field House (14,300); Iowa City, IA
12/29/1945*		DePaul	W 56–37	7–3	Huff Hall (5,079); Champaign, IL
1/1/1946		at Wisconsin	W 38–31	8–3 (1–2)	Wisconsin Field House (8,000); Madison, WI
1/5/1946		at Michigan	L 48–49	8–4 (1–3)	Yost Field House (7,000); Ann Arbor, MI
1/12/1946		at Ohio State	L 35–41	8–5 (1–4)	Ohio Expo Center Coliseum (2,800); Columbus, OH
1/14/1946		Northwestern; Rivalry	W 45–38	9–5 (2–4)	Huff Hall (6,310); Champaign, IL
1/19/1946		at University of Chicago	W 70–28	10–5 (3–4)	Henry Crown Field House (1,500); Chicago, IL
1/26/1946*		at Great Lakes	L 42–67	10–6	Great Lakes Gymnasium (2,500); Great Lakes, IL
2/4/1946		University of Chicago	W 85–24	11–6 (4–4)	Huff Hall (3,616); Champaign, IL
2/9/1946		Michigan	W 49–44	12–6 (5–4)	Huff Hall (7,005); Champaign, IL
2/16/1946		at Northwestern; Rivalry	L 43–48	12–7 (5–5)	Chicago Stadium (20,442); Chicago, IL
2/18/1946		Wisconsin	W 72–53	13–7 (6–5)	Huff Hall (5,992); Champaign, IL
2/23/1946		Iowa; Rivalry	W 57–51	14–7 (7–5)	Huff Hall (7,214); Champaign, IL
*Non-conference game. ^{#}Rankings from AP Poll. (#) Tournament seedings in parentheses. All times are in Central Time.

== Player stats ==
Player	Games played	Field goals	Free throws	Points
Bob Doster	20	107	59	273
Jack Burmaster	20	15	4	173
Wallie Mroz	17	53	20	126
Robert Rowe	20	26	16	68
Bob Menke	17	25	17	67
Dwight Humphrey	20	26	16	20
Jimmy Seyler	16	23	17	63
Fred Green	4	16	9	41
Ray McClure	16	17	4	38
Jack Smiley	4	13	8	34
Hal Craig	12	14	6	34
George Leddy	19	5	16	26
Leo Gedvilas	17	9	1	19
Van Anderson	7	9	1	19
Robert Olson	7	5	7	17
William Edwards	8	4	4	12
Dean Meador	6	3	0	6
Dwight Eddleman	2	3	0	6
Bob Dannehl	2	2	1	5
Cal Irvin	1	2	0	4
William Eddleman	3	2	0	4
Jack Pierce	1	2	0	4
Tony Esposito	1	2	0	4
Jake Staab	3	0	2	2
Harold Strange	1	1	0	2
Al Leavitt	3	1	0	2
Paul Eckert	1	0	1	1
Robert Jones	3	0	1	1
Joe Rodriguez	5	0	1	1

== Awards and honors ==
- Jack Burmaster
  - Sporting News Honorable Mention All-American (1946)
- Bob Doster
  - Sporting News Honorable Mention All-American (1946)
  - Team Most Valuable Player
