= James A. Brown =

American football and basketball coach (1900–1965)

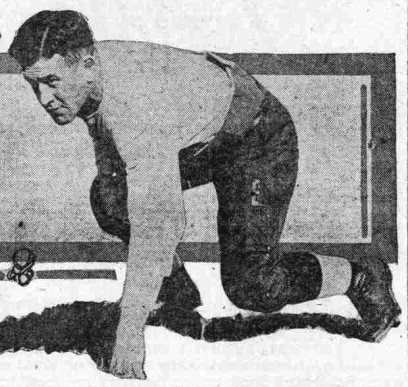
- Brown, circa 1922

Biographical details
- Born: July 31, 1900; Star, Idaho, U.S.
- Died: June 23, 1965 (aged 64); Caldwell, Idaho, U.S.

Playing career

Football
- 1920–1922: Idaho
- Position: Back

Coaching career (HC unless noted)

Football
- 1923–1924: Idaho (assistant)
- 1925–192x: Lewiston HS (ID)
- 1932–1934: Burley HS (ID)
- 1935–1940: Moscow HS (ID)
- 1941–1942: Idaho (assistant)
- 1945–1946: Idaho
- 1947–1955: Nampa HS (ID)
- 1958–1964: College of Idaho

Basketball
- 1925–192x: Lewiston HS (ID)
- 1932–1935: Burley HS (ID)
- 1935–1941: Moscow HS (ID)
- 1941–1942: Idaho (assistant)
- 1942–1946: Idaho
- 1947–1956: Nampa HS (ID)
- 1956–1961: College of Idaho

Administrative career (AD unless noted)
- 1943–1946: Idaho (interim AD)
- 1956–1965: College of Idaho

Head coaching record
- Overall: 27–54–2 (college football); 134–127 (college basketball)

James Allen "Babe" Brown (July 31, 1900 – June 23, 1965) was an American football and basketball coach and college athletics administrator. He was the head coach in basketball and football at the University of Idaho in Moscow, and later a three-sport coach and athletic director at the College of Idaho in Caldwell. He also coached multiple sports at four high schools in Idaho: Lewiston, Burley, Moscow, and Nampa.

== Early years ==
Born in the farming community of Star in southwestern Idaho, Brown graduated from Boise High School in 1919 and was a multi-sport athlete at the University of Idaho in Moscow, where he lettered in football, wrestling, and baseball. He was a hard-hitting fullback on the football team under head coaches Thomas Kelley and R.L. "Matty" Mathews. His senior season was Idaho's first as a member of the Pacific Coast Conference. He was also a member of Kappa Sigma fraternity.

== Coaching career ==
Following his playing days, Brown was an assistant at Idaho under Mathews, then became a high school coach in 1925 at Lewiston High School, and won the state title in basketball in 1926. After several years with the Bengals, he left coaching for two years to work in private business in southern Idaho, then returned to coaching in 1932 at Burley High School for three seasons. He returned to north Idaho to coach at Moscow High School in 1935, taking over the Bears' program from Gale Mix.

=== Idaho ===
After six years at MHS, Brown was hired across town as the freshman football coach at the University of Idaho in 1941. Brown moved up to the varsity as an assistant to head coach Francis Schmidt in 1942, but the football program went on hiatus prior to the 1943 season. In the meantime, he became acting head basketball coach in December 1942 and acting athletic director in 1943, when Guy Wicks and George Greene joined the navy. Brown led the UI basketball team to the northern division title of the PCC in his fourth and final season in 1946. The Vandals met southern division winner California in a three-game series in Berkeley; Idaho lost game one in a near-riot, won game two, but lost the third. After Schmidt's death in September 1944, Brown was the interim head coach for the abbreviated 1945 football season and was named head coach in March 1946. The Vandals posted one win in each of the two seasons for an overall 2-15 record and Brown resigned at the end of November.

After a dozen years residing in Moscow and six years as a collegiate coach, Brown returned to the high school level in 1947 back in southwestern Idaho at Nampa High School, where his teams won titles in football and basketball during his nine seasons with the Bulldogs. His 1950 basketball team won the state championship.

=== College of Idaho ===
In 1956, Brown was hired at the College of Idaho in Caldwell as athletic director, and also served as the head coach for basketball and baseball. When head football coach Ed Troxel resigned in 1958 to go to the new Borah High School in Boise, Brown took over as head football coach of the Coyotes. He stepped down as head basketball coach in 1961, and as football coach and athletic director following the 1964 football season.

Brown died in his sleep at age 64 of an apparent heart attack in June 1965 at his home in Caldwell, a week before his official retirement date. He and his wife LaVerne (1898–1961) are buried at Hillcrest Memorial Gardens in Caldwell.

== Head coaching record ==
=== College football ===
Year	Team	Overall	Conference	Standing	Bowl/playoffs
Idaho Vandals (Pacific Coast Conference) (1945–1946)
1945	Idaho	1–7	1–5	9th	
1946	Idaho	1–8	0–5	10th	
Idaho:		2–15	1–10		
College of Idaho Coyotes (Northwest Conference) (1958–1964)
1958	College of Idaho	3–6–1	1–3–1	5th	
1959	College of Idaho	6–3–1	2–2–1	3rd	
1960	College of Idaho	2–8	0–5	6th	
1961	College of Idaho	4–4	3–2	T–2nd	
1962	College of Idaho	5–4	2–3	4th	
1963	College of Idaho	3–6	1–4	5th	
1964	College of Idaho	1–8	0–5	6th	
College of Idaho:		25–39–2	9–24–2		
Total:		27–54–2			

=== College basketball ===
Record table
Season	Team	Overall	Conference	Standing	Postseason
Idaho Vandals (Pacific Coast Conference) (1942–1946)
1942–43	Idaho	14–20	1–15	5th (North)	
1943–44	Idaho	7–16	5–11	3rd (North)	
1944–45	Idaho	13–20	3–13	5th (North)	
1945–46	Idaho	23–11	11–5	1st (North)	PCC Finals
Idaho:		57–67	20–44		
College of Idaho Coyotes (Northwest Conference) (1956–1961)
1956–57	College of Idaho	11–15	7–8	T–4th	
1957–58	College of Idaho	14–14	8–7	T–3rd	
1958–59	College of Idaho	17–9	8–7	T–3rd	
1959–60	College of Idaho	16–13	8–7	3rd	
1960–61	College of Idaho	19–9	10–5	T–2nd	
College of Idaho:		77–60	41–34		
Total:		134–127			
National champion Postseason invitational champion Conference regular season champion Conference regular season and conference tournament champion Division regular season champion Division regular season and conference tournament champion Conference tournament champion
