= 1945–46 UCLA Bruins men's basketball team =

American college basketball season

1945–46 UCLA Bruins men's basketball

PCC Southern Division
- Conference: Pacific Coast Conference
- South
- Record: 8–16 (5–7 PCC)
- Head coach: Wilbur Johns (7th season)
- Assistant coach: Bill Putnam
- Home arena: Men's Gym

1945–46 Pacific Coast Conference men's basketball standings
	Conf.				Overall
Team	W		L	PCT	W		L	PCT
North
Idaho	11	–	5	.688	23	–	11	.676
Oregon State	10	–	6	.625	13	–	11	.542
Oregon	8	–	8	.500	16	–	17	.485
Washington	6	–	10	.375	14	–	14	.500
Washington State	5	–	11	.313	16	–	13	.552
South
California †	11	–	1	.917	30	–	6	.833
USC	8	–	4	.667	14	–	7	.667
UCLA	5	–	7	.417	8	–	16	.333
Stanford	0	–	12	.000	6	–	18	.250
† Conference championship playoff series winner

The 1945–46 UCLA Bruins men's basketball team represented the University of California, Los Angeles during the 1945–46 NCAA basketball season and was a member of the Pacific Coast Conference. Led by seventh-year head coach Wilbur Johns, the Bruins finished 8–16 overall and placed third in the PCC southern division with a record of 5–7.

== Previous season ==
The Bruins finished the regular season with a record of 12–12 and won the PCC southern division for the first time with a record of 3–1.

== Roster ==
1945–46 UCLA Bruins men's basketball team
Players
Coaches

Pos.	#	Name	Height	Weight	Year	Hometown
G	17	Bob Arnold	—	—
F	57	Chuck Clustka	—	—	Fr
		George Englund	—	—
	14	Glen Grant	—	—
C	13	Dick Hough (C)	—	—
F	38	Ralph Joeckel	—	—	So
	11	Ben Lewis	—	—
	23	Hal Michaels (C)	—	—
	23	Hal Michaels	—	—
F	54	Alan Sawyer	6 ft 5 in (1.96 m)	195 lb (88 kg)	Fr	Long Beach, California
G		Chuck Stewart	—	—
		Owen Stewart	—	—
		Mel Stoner	—	—
F	5	Ralph Witt	—	—

Head coach

Wilbur Johns (UCLA)

Assistant coach(es)

- Bill Putnam

Legend

- (C) Team captain
- (S) Suspended
- (I) Ineligible
- (W) Walk-on
- Injured
- Current redshirt

Roster
Last update: 30 January 2018

== Schedule ==
Date time, TV	Rank^{#}	Opponent^{#}	Result	Record	Site city, state
Regular Season
December 4, 1945*		Carroll Shamrocks	L 31–34	0–1	Men's Gym; Los Angeles, CA
December 7, 1945*		Long Beach ATC	W 44–41	1–1	Men's Gym; Los Angeles, CA
December 8, 1945*		Pepperdine	L 37–47	1–2	Men's Gym; Los Angeles, CA
December 11, 1945*		at Santa Ana Army Air Base	L 25–38	1–3	Santa Ana, CA
December 14, 1945*		at San Diego Naval TC	L 31–36	1–4	San Diego, CA
December 15, 1945*		at San Diego Dons	L 34–38	1–5	San Diego, CA
December 18, 1945*		at Camp Ross	L 33–47	1–6	
December 21, 1945*		Caltech	W 33–9	2–6	Men's Gym; Los Angeles, CA
December 22, 1945*		St. Mary's Pre-Flight	L 30–44	2–7	Men's Gym; Los Angeles, CA
December 28, 1945*		20th Century Fox	L 40–45	2–8	Men's Gym; Los Angeles, CA
December 30, 1945*		Camp Ross	L 49–67	2–9	Men's Gym; Los Angeles, CA
January 4, 1946		at California	L 33–45	2–10 (0–1)	Men's Gym; Berkeley, CA
January 5, 1946		at California	L 35–37	2–11 (0–2)	Men's Gym; Berkeley, CA
January 11, 1946		at USC	L 33–43	2–12 (0–3)	Shrine Auditorium; Los Angeles, CA
January 12, 1946		USC	L 40–45	2–13 (0–4)	Men's Gym; Los Angeles, CA
January 18, 1946		at Stanford	W 35–18	3–13 (1–4)	Stanford Pavilion; Stanford, CA
January 19, 1946		at Stanford	W 41–29	4–13 (2–4)	Stanford Pavilion; Stanford, CA
January 23, 1946*		Long Beach Proctors	W 49–29	5–13 (3–4)	Men's Gym; Los Angeles, CA
February 1, 1946		California	L 37–50	5–14 (2–5)	Men's Gym; Los Angeles, CA
February 2, 1946		California	L 25–49	5–15 (2–6)	Men's Gym; Los Angeles, CA
February 8, 1946		Stanford	W 39–26	6–15 (3–6)	Men's Gym; Los Angeles, CA
February 9, 1946		Stanford	W 47–20	7–15 (4–6)	Men's Gym; Los Angeles, CA
February 15, 1946		USC	W 45–35	8–15 (5–6)	Shrine Auditorium; Los Angeles, CA
February 16, 1946		USC	L 43–60	8–16 (5–7)	Men's Gym; Los Angeles, CA
*Non-conference game. ^{#}Rankings from AP Poll. (#) Tournament seedings in parentheses. All times are in Pacific Time.
