= 1945–46 Michigan Wolverines men's basketball team =

American college basketball season

1945–46 Michigan Wolverines men's basketball
- Conference: Big Ten Conference
- Record: 12–7 (6–6 Big Ten)
- Head coach: Bennie Oosterbaan
- Captain: Dave Strack
- Home arena: Yost Field House

1945–46 Big Ten Conference men's basketball standings
	Conf.				Overall
Team	W		L	PCT	W		L	PCT
Ohio State	10	–	2	.833	16	–	5	.762
Indiana	9	–	3	.750	18	–	3	.857
Iowa	8	–	4	.667	14	–	4	.778
Northwestern	8	–	4	.667	15	–	5	.750
Illinois	7	–	5	.583	14	–	7	.667
Minnesota	7	–	5	.583	14	–	7	.667
Michigan	6	–	6	.500	12	–	7	.632
Purdue	4	–	8	.333	10	–	11	.476
Wisconsin	1	–	11	.083	4	–	17	.190
Chicago	0	–	12	.000	6	–	14	.300

The 1945–46 Michigan Wolverines men's basketball team represented the University of Michigan in intercollegiate basketball during the 1945–46 season. The team finished the season in seventh place in the Big Ten Conference with an overall record of 12–7 and 6–6 against conference opponents.

Bennie Oosterbaan was in his eighth and final year as the team's head coach. Glen Selbo was the team's leading scorer with 212 points in 19 games for an average of 11.2 points per game. Dave Strack was the team captain.

== Statistical leaders ==
Player	Pos.	Yr	G	FG	FT	RB	Pts	PPG
Glen Selbo			19	88	37		213	11.2
Bob Harrison			19	83	35		201	10.6
Dave Strack			19	76	22		174	9.2
Pete Elliott			19	47	28		122	6.4
John Mullaney			19	39	35		113	5.9
Martin Feinberg			19	17	19		53	2.8
Totals			19	414	210		1038	54.6
