= 1946 Southern Conference men's basketball tournament =

- Classification: Division I
- Teams: 8
- Site: Thompson Gym; Raleigh, NC
- Champions: Duke (5th title)
- Winning coach: Gerry Gerard (2nd title)

1945–46 Southern Conference men's basketball standings
	Conf.				Overall
Team	W		L	PCT	W		L	PCT
North Carolina	13	–	1	.929	30	–	5	.857
Duke †	12	–	2	.857	21	–	6	.778
Virginia Tech	7	–	3	.700	11	–	8	.579
Wake Forest	8	–	5	.615	12	–	6	.667
Maryland	5	–	4	.556	9	–	12	.429
William & Mary	5	–	5	.500	10	–	10	.500
Furman	4	–	4	.500	16	–	3	.842
George Washington	4	–	5	.444	7	–	8	.467
Clemson	5	–	7	.417	9	–	11	.450
North Carolina State	5	–	7	.417	6	–	12	.333
South Carolina	4	–	7	.364	9	–	11	.450
Davidson	5	–	9	.357	13	–	12	.520
Richmond	3	–	7	.300	8	–	12	.400
The Citadel	1	–	6	.143	7	–	11	.389
VMI	1	–	6	.143	1	–	10	.091
Washington and Lee	0	–	4	.000	2	–	11	.154
† Southern Conference tournament winner

The 1946 Southern Conference men's basketball tournament took place from February 28–March 2, 1946, at Thompson Gym in Raleigh, North Carolina. The Duke Blue Devils won their fifth Southern Conference title, led by head coach Gerry Gerard.

== Format ==
The top eight finishers of the conference's sixteen members were eligible for the tournament. Teams were seeded based on conference winning percentage. The tournament used a preset bracket consisting of three rounds.

== Bracket ==
Quarterfinals; February 28
North Carolina	54
Maryland	27
Wake Forest	42
William & Mary	31
Duke	44
NC State	38
Virginia Tech	39
George Washington	33

Semifinals; March 1
North Carolina	29
Wake Forest	31
Duke	44
Virginia Tech	38

Finals; March 2
Duke	49
Wake Forest	30

* Overtime game

== See also ==
- List of Southern Conference men's basketball champions
