= 1945–46 Washington State Cougars men's basketball team =

American college basketball season

1945–46 Washington State Cougars men's basketball
- Conference: Pacific Coast Conference
- Record: 16–13 (5–11 PCC)
- Head coach: Jack Friel (18th season)
- Home arena: WSC Gymnasium

1945–46 Pacific Coast Conference men's basketball standings
	Conf.				Overall
Team	W		L	PCT	W		L	PCT
North
Idaho	11	–	5	.688	23	–	11	.676
Oregon State	10	–	6	.625	13	–	11	.542
Oregon	8	–	8	.500	16	–	17	.485
Washington	6	–	10	.375	14	–	14	.500
Washington State	5	–	11	.313	16	–	13	.552
South
California †	11	–	1	.917	30	–	6	.833
USC	8	–	4	.667	14	–	7	.667
UCLA	5	–	7	.417	8	–	16	.333
Stanford	0	–	12	.000	6	–	18	.250
† Conference championship playoff series winner

The 1945–46 Washington State Cougars men's basketball team represented Washington State College for the 1945–46 college basketball season. Led by eighteenth-year head coach Jack Friel, the Cougars were members of the Pacific Coast Conference and played their home games on campus at the WSC Gymnasium in Pullman, Washington.

The Cougars were 16–13 overall in the regular season and 5–11 in conference play, last place in the Northern division.
