= 1945–46 Washington Huskies men's basketball team =

American college basketball season

1945–46 Washington Huskies men's basketball
- Conference: Pacific Coast Conference
- Record: 14–14 (6–10 PCC)
- Head coach: Hec Edmundson (26th season)
- Home arena: UW Pavilion

1945–46 Pacific Coast Conference men's basketball standings
	Conf.				Overall
Team	W		L	PCT	W		L	PCT
North
Idaho	11	–	5	.688	23	–	11	.676
Oregon State	10	–	6	.625	13	–	11	.542
Oregon	8	–	8	.500	16	–	17	.485
Washington	6	–	10	.375	14	–	14	.500
Washington State	5	–	11	.313	16	–	13	.552
South
California †	11	–	1	.917	30	–	6	.833
USC	8	–	4	.667	14	–	7	.667
UCLA	5	–	7	.417	8	–	16	.333
Stanford	0	–	12	.000	6	–	18	.250
† Conference championship playoff series winner

The 1945–46 Washington Huskies men's basketball team represented the University of Washington for the 1945–46 NCAA college basketball season. Led by 26th-year head coach Hec Edmundson, the Huskies were members of the Pacific Coast Conference and played their home games on campus at the UW Pavilion in Seattle, Washington.

The Huskies were 14–14 overall in the regular season and 6–10 in conference play; fourth in the Northern division.
