= 1945–46 Duke Blue Devils men's basketball team =

American college basketball season

1945–46 Duke Blue Devils men's basketball

SoCon Tournament champion
- Conference: Southern Conference
- Record: 21–6 (12–2 Southern)
- Head coach: Gerry Gerard
- Home arena: Duke Indoor Stadium

1945–46 Southern Conference men's basketball standings
	Conf.				Overall
Team	W		L	PCT	W		L	PCT
North Carolina	13	–	1	.929	30	–	5	.857
Duke †	12	–	2	.857	21	–	6	.778
Virginia Tech	7	–	3	.700	11	–	8	.579
Wake Forest	8	–	5	.615	12	–	6	.667
Maryland	5	–	4	.556	9	–	12	.429
William & Mary	5	–	5	.500	10	–	10	.500
Furman	4	–	4	.500	16	–	3	.842
George Washington	4	–	5	.444	7	–	8	.467
Clemson	5	–	7	.417	9	–	11	.450
North Carolina State	5	–	7	.417	6	–	12	.333
South Carolina	4	–	7	.364	9	–	11	.450
Davidson	5	–	9	.357	13	–	12	.520
Richmond	3	–	7	.300	8	–	12	.400
The Citadel	1	–	6	.143	7	–	11	.389
VMI	1	–	6	.143	1	–	10	.091
Washington and Lee	0	–	4	.000	2	–	11	.154
† Southern Conference tournament winner

The 1945–46 Duke Blue Devils men's basketball team represented Duke University during the 1945–46 men's college basketball season. The head coach was Gerry Gerard, coaching his fourth season with the Blue Devils. The team finished with an overall record of 21–6.
