= Harry Good =

American sports coach (1902–1997)

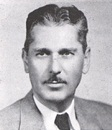
- 1953 Cornhusker, University of Nebraska Yearbook

Biographical details
- Born: January 7, 1902; Syracuse, Indiana, U.S.
- Died: January 23, 1997; Minneapolis, Minnesota, U.S.
- Education: Indiana Central

Coaching career (HC unless noted)

Football
- 1927–1931: Indiana Central

Basketball
- 1928–1943: Indiana Central
- 1943–1946: Indiana
- 1946–1954: Nebraska

Baseball
- 1928–1942: Indiana Central

Administrative career (AD unless noted)
- 1928–1942: Indiana Central

Head coaching record
- Overall: 13–22–4 (football); 318–183 (basketball); 118–42 (baseball)

Accomplishments and honors

Championships
- Basketball; 3 IIC regular season (1934, 1941–1942); 2 Big 7 regular season (1949–1950)

Harry Carlton Good (January 7, 1902 – January 23, 1997) was an American football, basketball and baseball coach at the University of Indianapolis (then known as Indiana Central College) from 1927 to 1943. He later served as the men's basketball coach at Indiana University (1943–1946) and the University of Nebraska (1946–1954).

== Playing career ==
Good was born in Syracuse, Indiana, and attended high school in South Bend. He enrolled at Indiana Central in 1921. By the time of his graduation in 1925, he had earned 14 letters in basketball, football, baseball, track, and tennis.

== Coaching career ==
Good earned a master's degree from Indiana University, then returned to Indiana Central in 1927. Over the next sixteen years, he coached most sports there, and also served as athletic director. At a time when the Big Ten had a color line in basketball, he actively recruited African American athletes to Indiana Central, most notably David "Big Dave" DeJernett, George Crowe, and Ray Crowe.

In 1943, Good became head basketball coach at Indiana University, as a temporary replacement for Branch McCracken, while the Hall of Fame coach served in the United States Navy during World War II. He coached the Hoosiers for three seasons, including an 18–3 finish in 1945–46, good enough for second place in the Big Ten.

Good then served as the head coach for the Nebraska Cornhuskers men's basketball team for eight seasons (1946–47 to 1953–54), leading the team to back-to-back Big 7 Conference championships in 1948–49 and 1949–50. To date, these remain the last Husker teams to win a conference regular season basketball title. He remained at Nebraska until his retirement in 1970, serving as golf coach and instructor of physical education.

== Head coaching record ==
=== Football ===
Year	Team	Overall	Conference	Standing	Bowl/playoffs
Indiana Central Greyhounds (Indiana Intercollegiate Conference) (1927–1931)
1927	Indiana Central	2–3–2	2–3–2	11th	
1928	Indiana Central	5–2–1	5–2–1	4th	
1929	Indiana Central	4–4	4–4	T–7th	
1930	Indiana Central	2–7	2–7	11th	
1931	Indiana Central	0–6–1	0–6–1	T–14th	
Indiana Central:		13–22–4	13–22–4		
Total:		13–22–4			

=== Basketball ===
Record table
Season	Team	Overall	Conference	Standing	Postseason
Indiana Central Greyhounds (Indiana Intercollegiate Conference) (1928–1943)
1928–29	Indiana Central	9–8	9–8		
1929–30	Indiana Central	10–5	10–5		
1930–31	Indiana Central	9–4	8–4		
1931–32	Indiana Central	10–5	10–5		
1932–33	Indiana Central	16–3	11–3		
1933–34	Indiana Central	16–1	14–1	1st	
1934–35	Indiana Central	15–4	12–3		
1935–36	Indiana Central	13–5	12–5		
1936–37	Indiana Central	14–4	13–3		
1937–38	Indiana Central	16–4	14–4		
1938–39	Indiana Central	12–5	12–5		
1939–40	Indiana Central	15–2	15–2		
1940–41	Indiana Central	17–1	10–0	T-1st	
1941–42	Indiana Central	16–0	12–0	T-1st	
1942–43	Indiana Central	9–3	7–2		
Indiana Central:		197–54 (.785)	169–50 (.772)		
Indiana Hoosiers (Big Ten/Big Nine) (1943–1946)
1943–44	Indiana	7–15	2–10	T–8th	
1944–45	Indiana	10–11	3–9	9th	
1945–46	Indiana	18–3	9–3	2nd	
Indiana:		35–29 (.547)	14–22 (.389)		
Nebraska Cornhuskers (Big Six/Big Seven) (1946–1954)
1946–47	Nebraska	10–14	3–7	T–5th	
1947–48	Nebraska	11–13	5–7	5th	
1948–49	Nebraska	16–10	9–3	T–1st	
1949–50	Nebraska	16–7	8–4	T–1st	
1950–51	Nebraska	9–14	4–8	5th	
1951–52	Nebraska	7–17	3–9	7th	
1952–53	Nebraska	8–13	5–7	T–4th	
1953–54	Nebraska	9–12	6–6	T–3rd	
Nebraska:		86–100 (.462)	43–51 (.457)		
Total:		318–183 (.635)			
National champion Postseason invitational champion Conference regular season champion Conference regular season and conference tournament champion Division regular season champion Division regular season and conference tournament champion Conference tournament champion
