= 1946 SEC men's basketball tournament =

- Classification: Division I
- Teams: 12
- Site: Jefferson County Armory; Louisville, Kentucky
- Champions: Kentucky (8th title)
- Winning coach: Rupp Arena (8th title)

1945–46 Southeastern Conference men's basketball standings
	Conf.				Overall
Team	W		L	PCT	W		L	PCT
Kentucky †	6	–	0	1.000	28	–	2	.933
LSU	8	–	0	1.000	18	–	3	.857
Tennessee	8	–	3	.727	14	–	4	.778
Alabama	8	–	4	.667	11	–	5	.688
Auburn	7	–	6	.538	7	–	9	.438
Georgia Tech	7	–	7	.500	10	–	11	.476
Georgia	6	–	6	.500	12	–	9	.571
Tulane	4	–	5	.444	15	–	7	.682
Vanderbilt	2	–	5	.286	3	–	10	.231
Florida	2	–	6	.250	7	–	14	.333
Ole Miss	2	–	8	.200	8	–	11	.421
Mississippi State	3	–	13	.188	5	–	14	.263
† Regular-season championship and SEC Tournament winner

The 1946 Southeastern Conference men's basketball tournament took place on February 28–March 2, 1946, in Louisville, Kentucky at the Jefferson County Armory. It was the thirteenth SEC basketball tournament.

Kentucky won the tournament by beating LSU in the championship game. The Wildcats would go on to win the 1946 National Invitation Tournament.

== Bracket ==
First Round
Georgia	36
Georgia Tech	30
LSU	74
Tulane	29
Tennessee	46
Vanderbilt	32
Kentucky	69
Auburn	24

Quarterfinals
Mississippi State	44
Georgia	45
Ole Miss	34
LSU	69
Alabama	35
Tennessee	24
Florida	32
Kentucky	69

Semifinals
Georgia	41
LSU	60
Alabama	30
Kentucky	59

Finals
LSU	36
Kentucky	59
