= 1945–46 Wisconsin Badgers men's basketball team =

American college basketball season

1945–46 Wisconsin Badgers men's basketball
- Conference: Big Ten Conference
- Record: 4–17 (1–11 Big Ten)
- Head coach: Harold E. Foster
- Home arena: UW Fieldhouse

1945–46 Big Ten Conference men's basketball standings
	Conf.				Overall
Team	W		L	PCT	W		L	PCT
Ohio State	10	–	2	.833	16	–	5	.762
Indiana	9	–	3	.750	18	–	3	.857
Iowa	8	–	4	.667	14	–	4	.778
Northwestern	8	–	4	.667	15	–	5	.750
Illinois	7	–	5	.583	14	–	7	.667
Minnesota	7	–	5	.583	14	–	7	.667
Michigan	6	–	6	.500	12	–	7	.632
Purdue	4	–	8	.333	10	–	11	.476
Wisconsin	1	–	11	.083	4	–	17	.190
Chicago	0	–	12	.000	6	–	14	.300

The 1945–46 Wisconsin Badgers men's basketball team represented University of Wisconsin–Madison. The head coach was Harold E. Foster, coaching his twelfth season with the Badgers. The team played their home games at the UW Fieldhouse in Madison, Wisconsin and was a member of the Big Nine Conference.

== Schedule ==
Date time, TV	Rank^{#}	Opponent^{#}	Result	Record	Site city, state
Regular Season
12/01/1945*		Carroll (WI)	W 67–25	1–0	UW Fieldhouse; Madison, WI
12/03/1945*		Ripon (WI)	W 59–24	2–0	UW Fieldhouse; Madison, WI
12/08/1945*		Marquette	W 42–32	3–0	UW Fieldhouse; Madison, WI
12/15/1945*		at Notre Dame	L 51–65	3–1	Notre Dame Fieldhouse; Notre Dame, IN
12/17/1945*		Great Lakes (IL)	L 47–54	3–2	UW Fieldhouse; Madison, WI
12/22/1945*		at Marquette	L 41–62	3–3	Marquette Gymnasium; Milwaukee, WI
12/23/1945*		at Great Lakes (IL)	L 39–53	3–4	Waukegan, IL
1/01/1946		at Illinois	L 31–56	3–5 (0–1)	Huff Hall; Champaign, IL
1/05/1946		at Minnesota	L 45–59	3–6 (0–2)	Minnesota Field House; Minneapolis, MN
1/07/1946		at Iowa	L 50–57	3–7 (0–3)	Iowa Field House; Iowa City, IA
1/12/1946		Purdue	L 49–53	3–8 (0–4)	UW Fieldhouse; Madison, WI
1/26/1946		vs. Northwestern	L 34–56	3–9 (0–5)	Chicago Stadium; Chicago, IL
1/28/1946		at Purdue	L 46–59	3–10 (0–6)	Purdue Fieldhouse; West Lafayette, IN
2/02/1946		Michigan	W 58–57	4–10 (1–6)	UW Fieldhouse; Madison, WI
2/09/1946		Northwestern	L 58–63	4–11 (1–7)	UW Fieldhouse; Madison, WI
2/11/1946		at Michigan	L 56–66	4–12 (1–8)	Yost Field House; Ann Arbor, MI
2/16/1946		Iowa	L 39–44	4–13 (1–9)	UW Fieldhouse; Madison, WI
2/18/1946		at Illinois	L 53–72	4–14 (1–10)	Huff Hall; Champaign, IL
2/23/1946*		Michigan State	L 48–59	4–15	UW Fieldhouse; Madison, WI
3/01/1946*		at Michigan State	L 52–56	4–16	Jenison Fieldhouse; East Lansing, MI
3/04/1946		at Minnesota	L 57–58	4–17 (1–11)	Minnesota Field House; Minneapolis, MN
*Non-conference game. ^{#}Rankings from AP Poll. (#) Tournament seedings in parentheses.
