= 1945–46 California Golden Bears men's basketball team =

American college basketball season

1945–46 California Golden Bears men's basketball

Pacific Coast Conference Champions

NCAA tournament, Fourth Place
- Conference: Pacific Coast Conference
- Record: 30–6 (11–1 PCC)
- Head coach: Nibs Price
- Home arena: Harmon Gym

1945–46 Pacific Coast Conference men's basketball standings
	Conf.				Overall
Team	W		L	PCT	W		L	PCT
North
Idaho	11	–	5	.688	23	–	11	.676
Oregon State	10	–	6	.625	13	–	11	.542
Oregon	8	–	8	.500	16	–	17	.485
Washington	6	–	10	.375	14	–	14	.500
Washington State	5	–	11	.313	16	–	13	.552
South
California †	11	–	1	.917	30	–	6	.833
USC	8	–	4	.667	14	–	7	.667
UCLA	5	–	7	.417	8	–	16	.333
Stanford	0	–	12	.000	6	–	18	.250
† Conference championship playoff series winner

The 1945–46 California Golden Bears men's basketball team represented the University of California, Berkeley in NCAA University Division basketball competition. Led by head coach Nibs Price, the Golden Bears made the first Final Four in program history. Cal finished in fourth place in the 1946 NCAA Tournament, losing to Ohio State in the consolation game.

== Roster ==
1945–46 California Golden Bears men's basketball team
Players
Coaches

Pos.	#	Name	Height	Weight	Year	Hometown
F		Andy Wolfe	6 ft 1 in (1.85 m)	—	So
F		Merv LaFaille (C)	6 ft 0 in (1.83 m)	—	Sr
C		Jim Smith	6 ft 5 in (1.96 m)	—	So
G		Bob Hogeboom	6 ft 1 in (1.85 m)	—	Jr
G		Jim Wray	5 ft 11 in (1.8 m)	—	Jr

Head coach

Nibs Price

Assistant coach(es)

Legend

- (C) Team captain
- (S) Suspended
- (I) Ineligible
- (W) Walk-on
- Injured
- Current redshirt

Roster

== Schedule and results ==
Date time, TV	Rank^{#}	Opponent^{#}	Result	Record	Site (attendance) city, state
Regular season
NCAA Tournament
Mar 22, 1946*		vs. Colorado; West Regional Semifinal / National Quarterfinal – Elite Eight	W 50–44	30–4	Municipal Auditorium; Kansas City, Missouri
Mar 23, 1946*		vs. Oklahoma A&M; West Regional Final / National Semifinal – Final Four	L 35–52	30–5	Municipal Auditorium; Kansas City, Missouri
Mar 26, 1946*		vs. Ohio State; National Third Place Game	L 45–63	30–6	Madison Square Garden; New York, New York
*Non-conference game. ^{#}Rankings from AP Poll. (#) Tournament seedings in parentheses. All times are in Pacific Time.
