= Sam B. Holt =

American coach and college athletics administrator

- Holt in the 1970s

Biographical details
- Born: August 20, 1902
- Died: May 24, 1986 (aged 83); Jefferson City, Tennessee, U.S.

Coaching career (HC unless noted)

Football
- 1929–1944: Carson–Newman
- 1945: William & Mary (assistant)
- 1946–1949: Carson–Newman

Basketball
- 19??–19??: Carson–Newman
- 1945–1946: William & Mary

Baseball
- 1927–1964: Carson–Newman
- 1946: William & Mary

Head coaching record
- Overall: 94–57–16 (football)
- Bowls: 0–1

Accomplishments and honors

Championships
- Football; 6 Smoky Mountain (1932–1933, 1936–1937, 1939, 1947)

Samuel B. "Frosty" Holt (August 20, 1902 – May 24, 1986) was an American college football, college basketball, and college baseball coach and athletics administrator. He served as the head football coach at Carson–Newman College—now known as Carson–Newman University—in Jefferson City, Tennessee from 1929 to 1949, compiling a record of 94–57–16.

== Coaching career ==
Holt was the head coach for the William & Mary Tribe men's basketball team for the 1945–46 season. In his sole year at the program's helm, Holt compiled 10–10 record with a mark of 5–5 in Southern Conference play.

== Death ==
Holt died on May 24, 1986, at a hospital in Jefferson City, Tennessee.

== Head coaching record ==
=== Football ===
Year	Team	Overall	Conference	Standing	Bowl/playoffs
Carson–Newman Parsons (Smoky Mountain Conference) (1929–1944)
1929	Carson–Newman	1–6–2	0–3–1	6th	
1930	Carson–Newman	5–4	3–2	4th	
1931	Carson–Newman	6–2–1	3–1–1	2nd	
1932	Carson–Newman	5–2–1	3–0	1st	
1933	Carson–Newman	7–1	6–0	1st	
1934	Carson–Newman	4–3–2	2–2–2	T–3rd	
1935	Carson–Newman	7–3	6–1	2nd	
1936	Carson–Newman	10–0	7–0	1st	
1937	Carson–Newman	7–1–1	6–0–1	1st	
1938	Carson–Newman	5–4–1	3–3–1	4th	
1939	Carson–Newman	4–3–2	4–1–2	1st	
1940	Carson–Newman	4–4	4–1	2nd	
1941	Carson–Newman	3–5–1	1–1–1	3rd	
1942	No team—World War II				
1943	Carson–Newman	4–1	NA	NA	
1944	Carson–Newman	3–1–1	NA	NA	
Carson–Newman Parsons (Smoky Mountain Conference) (1946–1949)
1946	Carson–Newman	5–3–1	2–1	2nd	
1947	Carson–Newman	8–1–2	3–0	1st	L Burley
1948	Carson–Newman	4–6	1–2	3rd	
1949	Carson–Newman	2–7–1	1–3	4th	
Carson–Newman:		94–57–16	55–21–9		
Total:		94–57–16			
National championship Conference title Conference division title or championship game berth
