= 1945–46 Oklahoma A&M Aggies men's basketball team =

American college basketball season

1945–46 Oklahoma A&M Aggies men's basketball
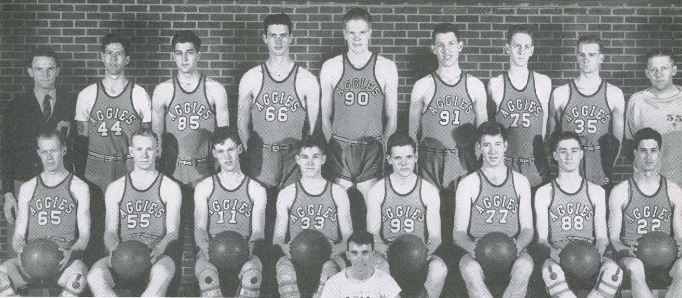

NCAA tournament National champions MVC regular season champions

National Championship Game, W 43–40 vs. North Carolina
- Conference: Missouri Valley Conference
- Record: 31–2 (12–0 MVC)
- Head coach: Henry Iba
- Assistant coach: Leroy Floyd

The 1945–46 Oklahoma A&M Aggies men's basketball team represented Oklahoma A&M College, now known as Oklahoma State University, in NCAA competition in the 1945–46 season. The Aggies won their second consecutive NCAA championship, defeating the North Carolina Tar Heels by a score of 43–40 in the championship game of the NCAA Tournament. In addition, Oklahoma A&M was retroactively named the national champion by the Helms Athletic Foundation and was retroactively ranked as the top team of the season by the Premo-Porretta Power Poll.

== NCAA tournament ==
- West Region
  - Oklahoma A&M 44, Baylor 29
- Final Four
  - Oklahoma A&M 52, California 35
- Finals
  - Oklahoma A&M 43, North Carolina 40
