= 1945–46 Indiana Hoosiers men's basketball team =

American college basketball season

1945–46 Indiana Hoosiers men's basketball
- Conference: Big Ten Conference
- Record: 18–3 (9–3 Big Nine)
- Head coach: Harry Good (3rd season)
- Captain: Dick Wittenbraker
- Home arena: The Fieldhouse

1945–46 Big Ten Conference men's basketball standings
	Conf.				Overall
Team	W		L	PCT	W		L	PCT
Ohio State	10	–	2	.833	16	–	5	.762
Indiana	9	–	3	.750	18	–	3	.857
Iowa	8	–	4	.667	14	–	4	.778
Northwestern	8	–	4	.667	15	–	5	.750
Illinois	7	–	5	.583	14	–	7	.667
Minnesota	7	–	5	.583	14	–	7	.667
Michigan	6	–	6	.500	12	–	7	.632
Purdue	4	–	8	.333	10	–	11	.476
Wisconsin	1	–	11	.083	4	–	17	.190
Chicago	0	–	12	.000	6	–	14	.300

The 1945–46 Indiana Hoosiers men's basketball team represented Indiana University. Their head coach was Harry Good, who was in his 3rd and final year as Branch McCracken returned from World War II in time for the following season. The team played its home games in The Fieldhouse in Bloomington, Indiana, and was a member of the Big Nine Conference.

The Hoosiers finished the regular season with an overall record of 18–3 and a conference record of 9–3, finishing 2nd in the Big Nine Conference. Indiana was not invited to participate in any postseason tournament.

== Roster ==
No.	Name	Position	Ht.	Year	Hometown
4	Joseph Normington	F	5–10	Fr.	Greenwood, Indiana
4	Bob Lollar	F	6–2	So.	Indianapolis, Indiana
6	Louis Edmonds	F	6–2	Fr.	Frankfort, Indiana
7	Dave Walker	F	6–3	Fr.	Loogootee, Indiana
8	Bill Shephard	F	6–1	Fr.	Hope, Indiana
9	Jack Herron	G	5–8	Sr.	Logansport, Indiana
10	John Wallace	F	6–3	So.	Richmond, Indiana
11	Tom Schwartz	C	6–6	Fr.	Kokomo, Indiana
12	Norbert Hermann	G	6–2	So.	Brownstown, Indiana
14	Jim Stepler	C	6–4	Fr.	Greentown, Indiana
15	Roy Kilby	G	5–10	Sr.	Muncie, Indiana
16	Louis Amaya	G	6–1	Fr.	Pueblo, Colorado
17	Jim Powers	G	6–1	Fr.	South Bend, Indiana
21	Dick Wittenbraker	G	6–2	Sr.	New Castle, Indiana
23	Freeland Armstrong	G	5–11	So.	Paoli, Indiana
25	Don Dewer	G	6–2	Fr.	Aurora, Indiana
26	Richard Westlake	G	6–1	Fr.	New Palestine, Indiana
27	Gene Turner	G	5–11	So.	Kokomo, Indiana
29	Charles Radcliffe	F	5–10	Sr.	Paoli, Indiana
32	James Copeland	F	6–2	So.	Elwood, Indiana
35	Al Kravolansky	F	6–3	Jr.	East Chicago, Indiana
37	Stephen Chaleff	G	6–1	Fr.	Indianapolis, Indiana
38	Dee Baker	F	5–11	Fr.	Indianapolis, Indiana
40	Robert Mehl	F	6–1	Fr.	Indianapolis, Indiana

== Schedule/results ==
Date time, TV	Rank^{#}	Opponent^{#}	Result	Record	Site city, state
Regular season
12/1/1945*		Camp Atterbury	W 59–49	1–0	The Fieldhouse; Bloomington, Indiana
12/8/1945*		Washington (Mo.)	W 53–39	2–0	The Fieldhouse; Bloomington, Indiana
12/11/1945*		at Camp Atterbury	W 56–53	3–0	Camp Atterbury, Indiana
12/15/1945*		at Louisville	W 62–59	4–0	Jefferson County Armory; Louisville, Kentucky
12/18/1945*		Cincinnati	W 54–44	5–0	The Fieldhouse; Bloomington, Indiana
12/22/1945		at Michigan	W 67–58	6–0 (1–0)	Yost Field House; Ann Arbor, Michigan
1/1/1946*		at Butler	W 58–47	7–0 (1–0)	Butler Fieldhouse; Indianapolis
1/5/1946		at Chicago	W 59–34	8–0 (2–0)	Henry Crown Field House; Chicago
1/7/1946		Minnesota	L 47–58	8–1 (2–1)	The Fieldhouse; Bloomington, Indiana
1/12/1946		Iowa	W 45–39	9–1 (3–1)	The Fieldhouse; Bloomington, Indiana
1/16/1946		at Purdue; Rivalry	L 38–49	9–2 (3–2)	Lambert Fieldhouse; West Lafayette, Indiana
1/19/1946		Ohio State	W 44–39	10–2 (4–2)	The Fieldhouse; Bloomington, Indiana
1/21/1946		Michigan	W 46–43	11–2 (5–2)	The Fieldhouse; Bloomington, Indiana
1/26/1946		Chicago	W 61–32	12–2 (6–2)	The Fieldhouse; Bloomington, Indiana
2/5/1946*		at Washington (Mo.)	W 56–46	13–2 (6–2)	Field House; St. Louis, Missouri
2/9/1946		at Ohio State	L 52–53	13–3 (6–3)	Ohio Expo Center Coliseum; Columbus, Ohio
2/11/1946*		at Cincinnati	W 60–22	14–3 (6–3)	Schmidlapp Gymnasium; Cincinnati, Ohio
2/16/1946		Purdue; Rivalry	W 57–47	15–3 (7–3)	The Fieldhouse; Bloomington, Indiana
2/19/1946*		Ball State	W 84–41	16–3 (7–3)	The Fieldhouse; Bloomington, Indiana
2/23/1946		at Minnesota	W 75–52	17–3 (8–3)	Minnesota Field House; Minneapolis
2/25/1946		at Iowa	W 49–46	18–3 (9–3)	Iowa Field House; Iowa City, Iowa
*Non-conference game. ^{#}Rankings from AP Poll. (#) Tournament seedings in parentheses.
