= All-College Basketball Classic =

- Sport: Basketball
- Founded: 1935
- Founder: Oklahoma Publishing Company; later the Oklahoma City All-Sports Association
- First season: 1935
- Folded: 2016
- No. of teams: 4
- Country: United States
- Broadcaster: ESPN2

The All-College Basketball Classic was a college basketball event that was played during the winter holidays in Oklahoma City from 1935 to 2016. The final events were held at the Chesapeake Energy Arena. The All-College followed a tournament format until 2000, it was replaced by non-conference games featuring the Oklahoma Sooners and Oklahoma State Cowboys. The All-College Basketball Classic preceded the NCAA, NIT, NAIA, and NBA tournaments.

The All-College Tournament was originally conceived by Henry P. Iba, the coach at Oklahoma A&M, and Bus Ham, sports editor of The Oklahoman. The original purpose of the tournament was to increase interest in high school basketball in Oklahoma, and thereby to improve the quality of the college teams in the state. The first tournament included 16 teams from Oklahoma, Texas, and Kansas, and was played at Classen High School; Oklahoma A&M won the first title game over Tulsa, 40–17. Two years later the tournament had grown to 32 teams. When the publisher of The Oklahoman made known its intention to end its sponsorship, the Oklahoma City All Sports Association was formed in 1957 to take over the tournament.

The size, sponsorship, and success of the tournament varied over the years, and it shrank to four teams in 1981. In 1999 it had what one report called "one of its worst fields ever" with three small college programs along with Oklahoma. The last traditionally-formatted tournament was played in 2000, with Oklahoma beating SMU 79–78 in the title game. Beginning in 2001, the event switched to a showcase format, with a pre-determined schedule and no title game. In 2013 the event included women's basketball for the first time, presenting a doubleheader featuring the Oklahoma State men's and women's teams each playing a game against an out-of-state foe.

== Tournament champions ==
Year	Winner	Score	Opponent	Source
1936–37	Oklahoma A&M	40–17	Tulsa	
1937	Oklahoma A&M	26–22	Southwestern (KS)	
1938	Central Missouri State	33–25	Texas	
1939	Oklahoma A&M	37–34	Texas Tech	
1940	Pittsburg State	39–38	Texas	
1941	West Texas State	37–31	Oklahoma A&M	
1942	TCU	37–25	Arkansas	
1943	Oklahoma	31–27	Norman NAS	
1944	Oklahoma A&M	43–34	Arkansas	
1945	Oklahoma A&M	65–46	Baylor	
1946	Oklahoma A&M	42–39	Kansas	
1947	Oklahoma A&M	32–31	Texas	
1948	Oklahoma A&M	39–36	Baylor	
1949				
1950	Oklahoma A&M	54–41	Arkansas	
1951				
1952	Oklahoma A&M	51–49	Idaho	
1953	Oklahoma A&M	67–56	Santa Clara	
1954	San Francisco	73–57	George Washington	
1955	Tulsa	65–58	Oklahoma City	
1956	Seattle	70–69	Oklahoma City	
1957	San Francisco			
1958	Oklahoma City	75–59	Duquesne	
1959	Utah State	75–59	Oklahoma City	
1960	Wichita	76–74	Baylor	
1961	Bowling Green	47–45	Houston	
1962	Loyola Chicago	93–82	Wyoming	
1963	Wichita	80–47	Oklahoma City	
1964	DePaul	67–60	Oklahoma City	
1965	Oklahoma City	99–90	VPI	
1966	Montana State	82–81	Oklahoma City	
1967	Oklahoma City	91–88	BYU	
1968	LSU	94–91	Duquesne	
1969	Niagara	87–75	Oklahoma City	
1970	Utah State	97–81	LSU	
1971	Eastern Kentucky	83–78	Oklahoma City	
1972	Long Beach State	101–89	BYU	
1973	USC	96–75	Oral Roberts	
1974	Centenary	91–80	Oklahoma City	
1975	Long Island	80–78	Centenary	
1976	VMI	69–58	Oklahoma City	
1977	San Francisco	102–90	Arizona State	
1978	New Mexico State	63–58	Weber State	
1979	Oklahoma	80–70	Louisiana Tech	
1980	Oklahoma State	94–83	Idaho	
1981	Lamar	63–51	Rhode Island	
1982	Oklahoma State	76–64	Oklahoma City	
1983	Oklahoma	87–62	Arkansas–Little Rock	
1984	Oklahoma	84–72	Louisiana Tech	
1985	Oklahoma	92–69	SMU	
1986	TCU	95–82	Oklahoma	
1987	Oklahoma	107–56	Illinois State	
1988	Oklahoma	124–95	Texas	
1989	Oklahoma	99–78	Tulsa	
1990	Oklahoma	112–99	Tulsa	
1991	Oklahoma	78–73	TCU	
1992	Oklahoma	95–76	Texas	
1993	Oklahoma	95–76	Tulsa	
1994	Oklahoma	76–61	Tulsa	
1995	Florida	76–72	Oklahoma	
1996	Tulsa	78–75	Oklahoma	
1997	Oklahoma	79–61	Alabama	
1998	Oklahoma	83–72	Oral Roberts	
1999	Oklahoma	64–51	Arkansas State	
2000	Oklahoma	79–78	SMU	
