= 1944–45 NYU Violets men's basketball team =

American college basketball season

1944–45 NYU Violets men's basketball

1945 NCAA tournament, Runner-up

National Championship Game, L 45-49 vs. Oklahoma A&M
- Conference: Independent
- Record: 14–7
- Head coach: Howard Cann

The 1944–45 NYU Violets men's basketball team represented New York University in intercollegiate basketball during the 1944–45 season. The team finished the season with a 14–7 overall record and were national runners-up to the Oklahoma A&M Aggies (now known as the Oklahoma State Cowboys). The Violets were led by head coach and future Basketball Hall of Famer Howard Cann, while the Aggies were led by future hall of fame player Bob Kurland. The 1944–45 season was NYU's first of two NCAA Division I Final Four appearances; the second was in 1959–60.
