= NYU Violets men's basketball =

- University: New York University
- First season: 1906; 120 years ago
- Head coach: Waleed Farid (1st season)
- Location: New York, New York
- Arena: John A. Paulson Center
- Conference: University Athletic Association
- Nickname: Violets
- Colors: Purple and white

NCAA Division I tournament runner-up
- Division I 1945 Division III; 1994, 2025
Other NCAA Division I tournament results
Final Four	Division I 1945, 1960 Division III; 1994, 2025
Appearances	Division I 1943, 1945, 1946, 1960, 1962, 1963 Division III; 1986, 1992, 1993, 1994, 1995, 1996, 1997, 1998, 2012, 2016, 2023, 2024, 2025, 2026

Pre-tournament Helms national champions
- 1935

Conference regular-season champions
- 1934, 1938, 1946, 1948, 1957, 1960, 1993, 1994

The NYU Violets men's basketball team is the college basketball team that represents New York University, located in New York City. The team currently competes in NCAA Division III as a member of the University Athletic Association. NYU previously competed as an NCAA Division I program until 1971, when the team was disbanded due to a budget crisis. The team was reinstated in 1983 as a Division III program.

NYU played in two NCAA Division I Final Fours (1945 and 1960). In the pre-poll, pre-tournament era, the 1934–35 team were retroactively selected as national championships by the Helms Athletic Foundation, and the Premo-Porretta Power Poll retroactively ranked the team as the top team that season. NYU has also had success in the Division III NCAA tournament, including national runner-up finishes at the 1994 and 2025 tournaments.

== Division I history ==
While a member of Division I, the Violets' basketball team registered a great deal of success. An early member who starred for the team in 1910 and 1911 was Lazarus Joseph (1891–1966), later a NY State Senator and New York City Comptroller.

The school's best NCAA tournament result was finishing runner-up to Oklahoma State (then Oklahoma A&M), coached by the legendary Henry Iba. at the 1945 NCAA tournament. NYU returned to the Final Four in 1960, losing to Ohio State, whose roster featured Jerry Lucas and John Havlicek.

NYU achieved even more success in the years before the advent of the NCAA tournament in 1939. In 1920 NYU won the Amateur Athletic Union national championship tournament, led by the Helms Athletic Foundation Player of the Year, Howard Cann. Cann returned to coach at NYU after graduation, serving as head basketball coach from 1923 to 1958 and leading NYU to notable success. The Violets were undefeated in the 1933–1934 season, posting a 16–0 record. After winning the first ten games to start the following season, the school's winning streak was broken in an overtime loss at Yale. The loss to Yale was the only setback during the 1934–1935 season, during which NYU finished 19–1 and was retroactively named the best team in the nation by the Helms Athletic Foundation and the Premo-Porretta Power Poll. However, these findings are unofficial and unrecognized by the NCAA. Finally, the year before the NCAA tournament was created, NYU reached the Final Four at the 1938 National Invitation Tournament.

For the seasons before the AP Poll began ranking college basketball teams in 1949, the Premo-Porretta Poll retrospectively ranks NYU among the final top 5 teams nationally for a number of seasons, including #1 in 1935, #2 in 1909 and 1934, #3 in 1920, #4 in 1921, and #5 in 1930. NYU also appeared in the first AP Poll issued, on January 18, 1949. The school made its final appearance in the Division I AP Poll ranked at #10 on December 24, 1964.

The Violets' most recent post-season accomplishment as a Division I college was finishing as the runner-up to BYU in the 1966 National Invitation Tournament. NYU previously also finished as runner-up in the 1948 National Invitation Tournament, and in third place in the 1959 National Invitation Tournament.

NYU was a member of the Metropolitan New York Conference from 1933 to 1963, and won four conference titles after the conference officially began sponsoring men's basketball in 1946.

The program was disbanded following a disastrous 5–20 season in 1970–71. When NYU ended its program, the Violets were still tied for 14th nationally in Final Four appearances (2), and 28th nationally in all-time appearances at the NCAA Division I tournament (6).

== Division III history ==
NYU has once again found success since its reestablishment as a Division III program in 1983.

The school appeared in seven consecutive Division III NCAA basketball tournaments from 1992 to 1998. In 1994 NYU advanced to the Final Four and finished as the national runner-up to Lebanon Valley College. The 1994 team also established a school record by winning 25 games.

== Postseason history ==
=== Division I NCAA ===
In their times in Division I, the Violets appeared in the NCAA Tournament six times. Their record was 9–8.

Year	Seed	Round	Opponent	Result
1943		Quarterfinals	Georgetown	L 55–36
1945		Quarterfinals; Semifinals; Final Four	Tufts; Ohio State; Oklahoma A&M	W 59–44; W 70–65 (OT); L 49–45
1946		Quarterfinals; Regional Third Place	North Carolina; Harvard	L 57–49; W 67–61
1960		Quarterfinals; Semifinals; Finals; Final Four; National Third Place	Connecticut; West Virginia; Duke; Ohio State; Cincinnati	W 78–59; W 82–81 (OT); W 74–59; L 76–54; L 95–71
1962		Quarterfinals; Semifinals; East Regional Third Place	Massachusetts; Villanova; Saint Joseph's	W 70–50; L 79–76; W 94–85
1963		Quarterfinals; Semifinals; East Regional Third Place	Pittsburgh; Duke; West Virginia	W 93–83; L 81–76; L 83–73

=== NIT ===
NYU appeared in 8 NITs and compiled and overall record of 13–11.

Year	Round	Opponent	Result
1938	First Round; Semifinals; 3rd Place Game	LIU; Colorado; Oklahoma A&M	W 39–37; L 48–47; L 37–24
1948	Quarterfinals; Semifinals; Championship	Texas; DePaul; St. Louis	W 45–43; W 72–59; L 65–52
1949	First Round	Bradley	L 59–57
1952	First Round	Dayton	L 81–66
1959	First Round; Quarterfinals; Semifinals; 3rd Place Game	Denver; Oklahoma City; Bradley; Providence	W 90–81; W 63–48; L 59–57; W 71–57
1964	First Round; Quarterfinals; Semifinals; 3rd Place Game	Syracuse; DePaul; New Mexico; Army	W 77–68; W 79–66; L 72–65; L 60–59
1965	First Round; Quarterfinals; Semifinals; 3rd Place Game	Bradley; Detroit; Villanova; Army	W 71–70; W87–76; L 91–69; L 75–74
1966	First Round; Quarterfinals; Semifinals; Championship	DePaul; Wichita State; Villanova; BYU	W 68–65; W 90–84 (OT); W 67–63; L 97–84

== Individual accolades ==
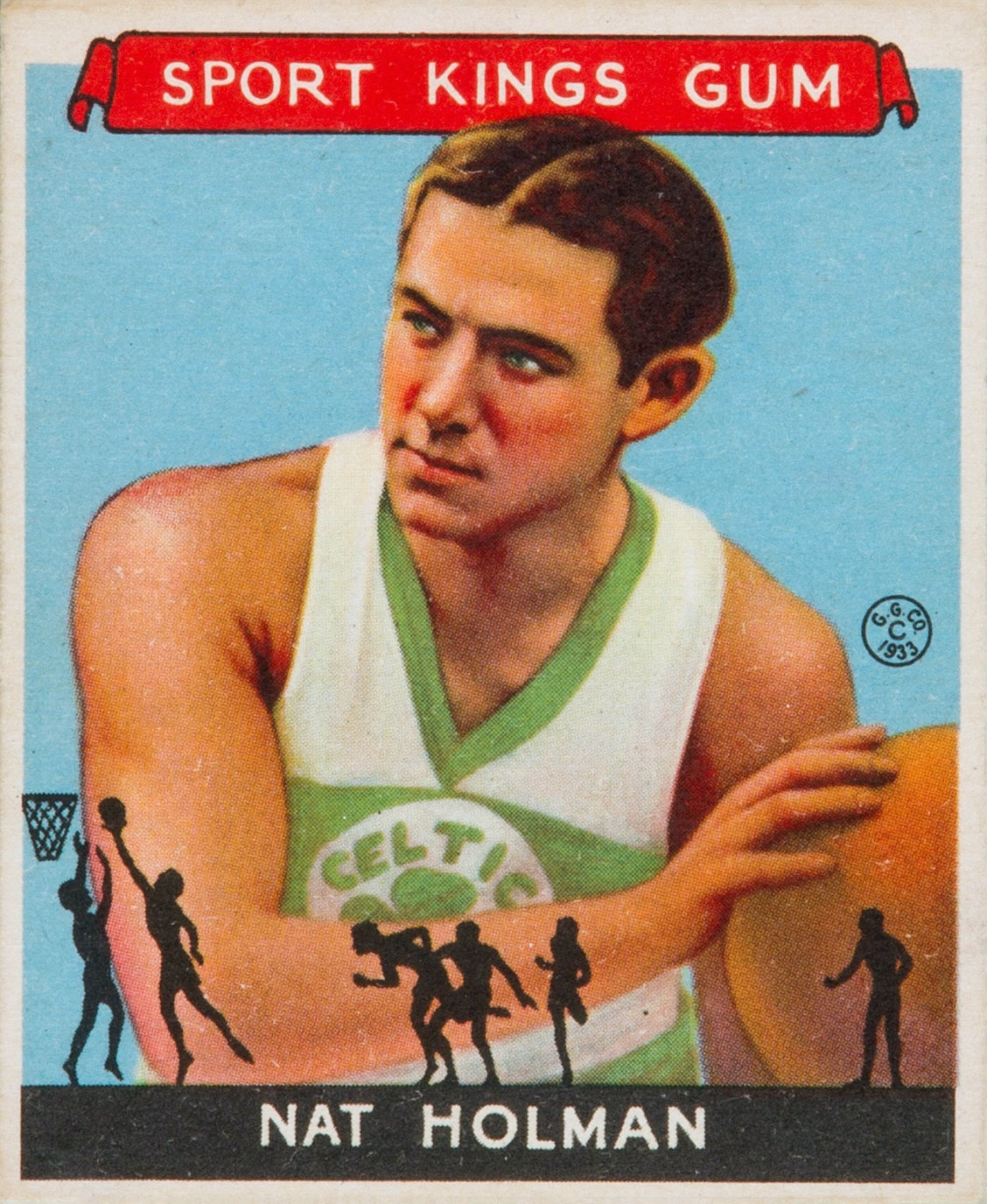
Nat Holman

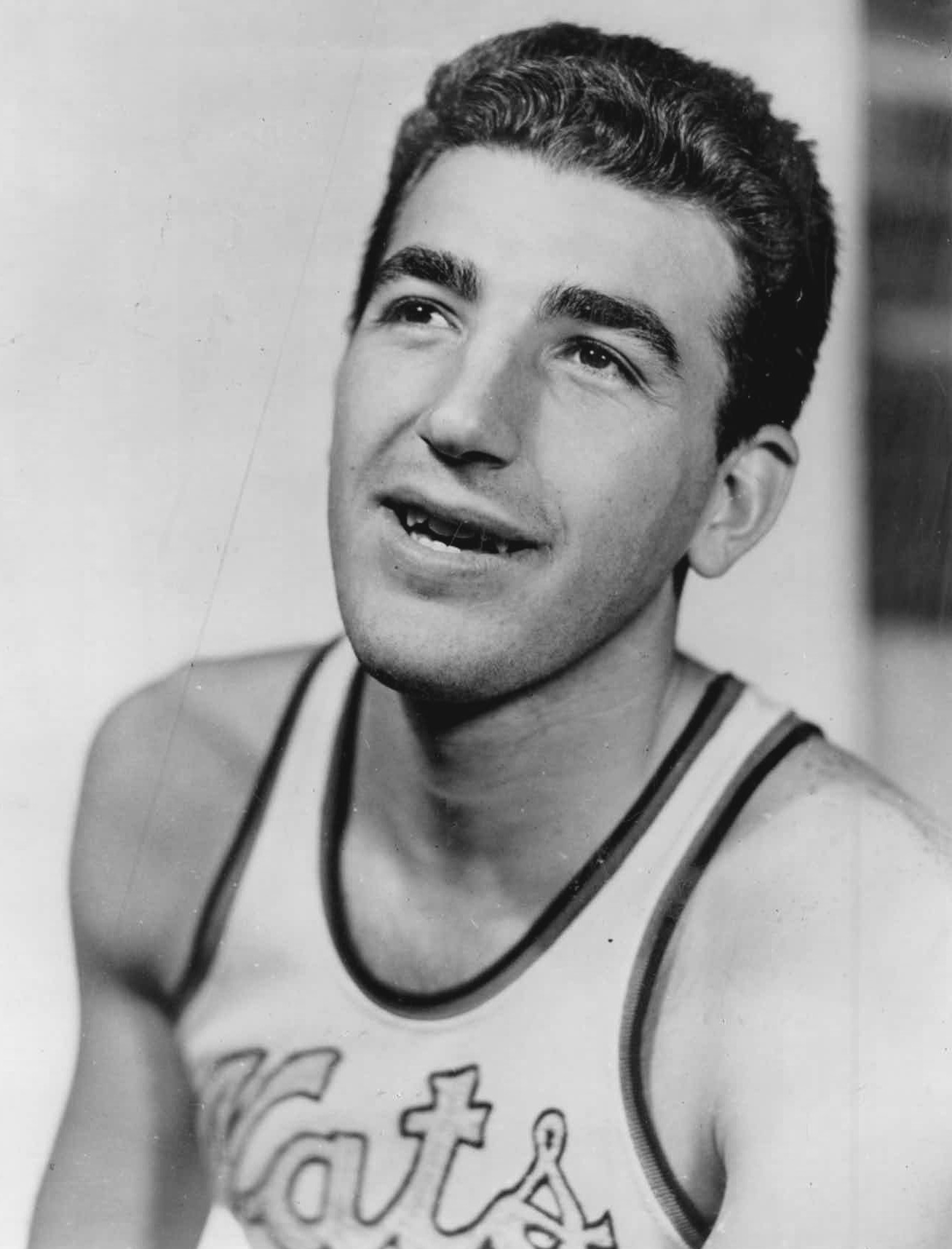
Dolph Schayes

The following NYU players and coaches are in the Naismith Memorial Basketball Hall of Fame (with induction year):

- Nat Holman (1964)
- Howard Cann (1968)
- Dolph Schayes (1973)
- Satch Sanders (2011), inducted as a contributor

=== National and Metro honors ===
NYU players and coaches have won the following national and regional awards: Player honors

- Helms Foundation College Basketball Player of the Year
  National player of the year

Howard Cann – 1920

- MBWA Haggerty Award
  NYC Metro college basketball player of the year

Ben Auerbach – 1940
Sid Tanenbaum – 1946, 1947
Dolph Schayes – 1948
Satch Sanders – 1960
Barry Kramer – 1963

Coaching honors

- MBWA Division I Coach of the Year

Howard Cann – 1948

=== Conference honors ===
The University Athletic Association began awarding Conference Player of the Year and Coaching Staff of the Year awards when it was founded in 1987.

- Player of the Year

Adam Crawford – 1994
Jesse Determann – 1998
Jason Boone – 2006

- Coaching Staff of the Year

Joe Nesci – 1993, 1994, 2012
