= 1945 NCAA basketball championship game =

1945 NCAA Tournament Championship Game
National championship game
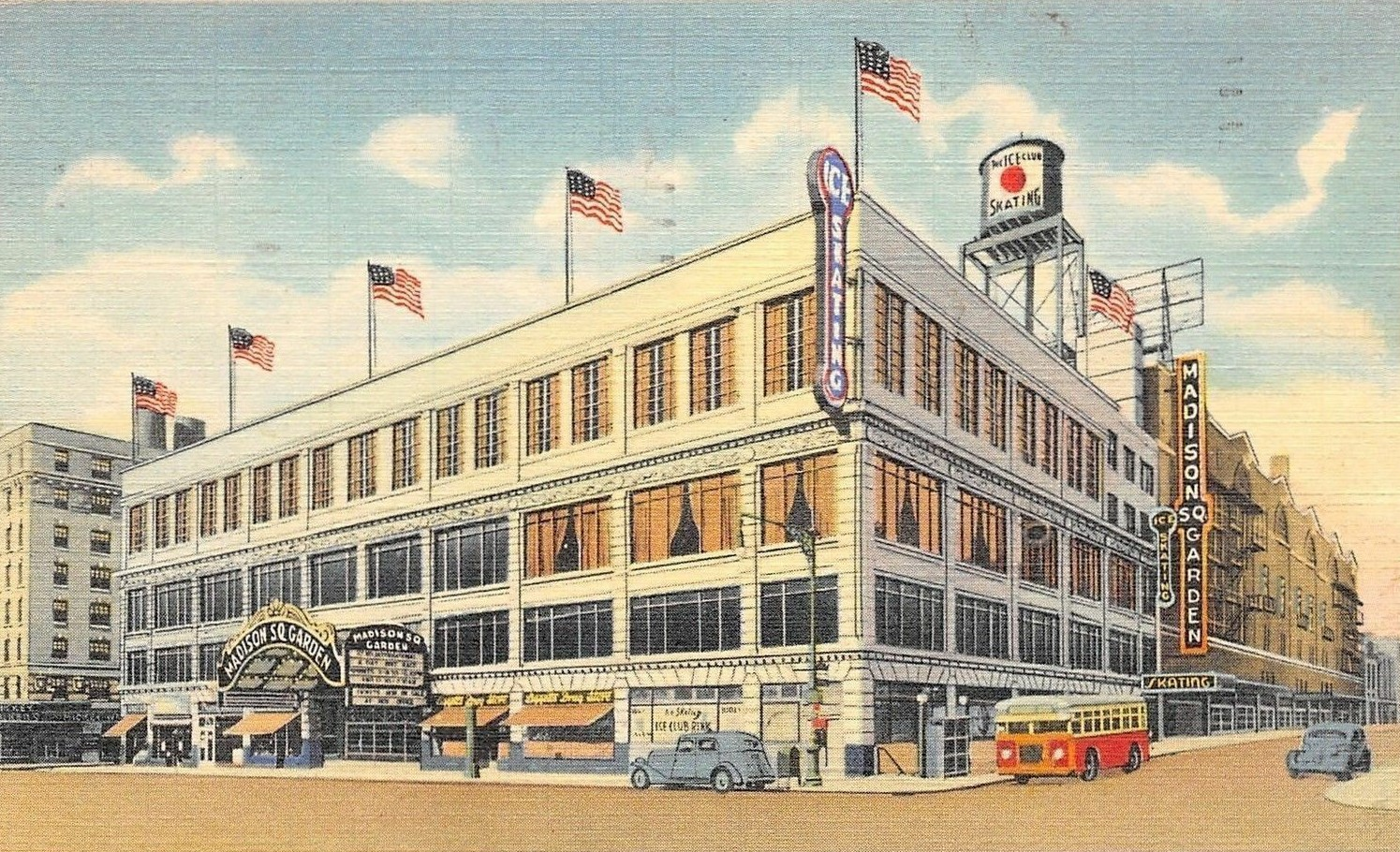
- Madison Square Garden in New York City, New York, hosted the championship game.
Oklahoma A&M Aggies	NYU Violets
MVC	Independent
(26-4)	(14-6)
49	45
Head coach: Henry Iba	Head coach: Howard Cann
	1st half	2nd half	Total
Oklahoma A&M Aggies	26	23	49
NYU Violets	21	24	45
- Date: March 27, 1945
- Venue: Madison Square Garden, New York City, New York
- MVP: Bob Kurland, Oklahoma A&M

The 1945 NCAA University Division Basketball Championship Game was the finals of the 1945 NCAA basketball tournament and it determined the national champion for the 1944-45 NCAA men's basketball season. The game was played on March 27, 1945, at Madison Square Garden in New York City. It featured the Oklahoma A&M Aggies of the Missouri Valley Conference, and the independent NYU Violets.

== Participating teams ==
=== Oklahoma A&M Aggies ===
- West
  - Oklahoma A&M 62, Utah 37
- Final Four
  - Oklahoma A&M 68, Arkansas 41

=== NYU Violets ===
- East
  - NYU 59, Navy 44
- Final Four
  - NYU 70, Ohio State 65 (OT)

== Game summary ==
March 27, 1945

Oklahoma A&M Aggies 49, NYU Violets 45
Scoring by half: 26-21, 23-24
Pts: Bob Kurland 22	Pts: Al Grenert 12

Madison Square Garden, New York City
