= 1944–45 Arkansas Razorbacks men's basketball team =

American college basketball season

1944–45 Arkansas Razorbacks men's basketball

NCAA tournament, Final Four
- Conference: Southwest Conference
- Record: 17–9 (9–3 SWC)
- Head coach: Eugene Lambert (3rd season)
- Home arena: Men's Gymnasium

1944–45 Southwest Conference men's basketball standings
	Conf.				Overall
Team	W		L	PCT	W		L	PCT
Rice	12	–	0	1.000	20	–	1	.952
Arkansas	9	–	3	.750	17	–	9	.654
SMU	7	–	5	.583	11	–	10	.524
TCU	7	–	5	.583	9	–	20	.310
Texas	5	–	7	.417	10	–	10	.500
Texas A&M	2	–	10	.167	3	–	18	.143
Baylor	0	–	12	.000	0	–	17	.000

The 1944–45 Arkansas Razorbacks men's basketball team represented the University of Arkansas in the 1944–45 college basketball season. The Razorbacks played their home games in the Men's Gymnasium in Fayetteville, Arkansas. It was former Razorback All-American Eugene Lambert's third season as head coach of the Hogs. The Razorbacks finished second in the Southwest Conference standings with a record of 9–3 and 17–9 overall.

Arkansas received a bid to the NCAA tournament, its second appearance in the tournament overall after not being able to participate the year before due to a serious car crash that killed a staff member, Everett Norris, and injured two starters, Deno Nichols and Ben Jones. Arkansas beat Oregon in the first round of the tournament to advance to its second Final Four in as many tournament appearances before losing to eventual champion Oklahoma A&M in the two clubs' fourth meeting of the season.

Center George Kok was named First Team All-SWC for the season.

== Roster ==
Roster retrieved from HogStats.com.

1944–45 Arkansas Razorbacks men's basketball team
Players
Coaches

Pos.	#	Name	Height	Weight	Year	Previous school	Hometown
G	72	Melvin McGaha	6 ft 1 in (1.85 m)	190 lb (86 kg)	Fr	Mabelvale	Oak Grove, Louisiana
G	37	Bill Flynt	6 ft 0 in (1.83 m)	—	Jr	Beebe; Ouachita Baptist	Beebe, Arkansas
F		Ocie Richie	6 ft 3 in (1.91 m)	—	So	Natchitoches; Northwestern State	Natchitoches, Louisiana
	15	Mike Schumchyk	—	—	So	Center Moriches	Long Island, New York
	71	Earl Wheeler	—	—	Jr
	24	Tony Byles	—	—	Fr	Marthaville	Robeline, Louisiana
G	40	Kenneth Kearns	—	—	Fr	Denton	Denton, Texas
	78	Frank Schumchyk	—	—	Jr	N/A	Long Island, New York
		Charles Joliff	—	—	Jr
	55	Jady Copeland	—	—
C	42	George Kok	6 ft 10 in (2.08 m)	195 lb (88 kg)	Fr	Ottawa Hills	Grand Rapids, Michigan

Head coach

Eugene Lambert (Arkansas)

Assistant coach(es)

Legend

- (C) Team captain
- (S) Suspended
- (I) Ineligible
- (W) Walk-on
- Injured
- Current redshirt

Roster
Last update: June 29, 2021

== Schedule and results ==
Schedule retrieved from HogStats.com.

Date time, TV	Rank^{#}	Opponent^{#}	Result	Record	Site city, state
Regular season
December 7, 1944*		at Kansas State Teachers College of Pittsburg	W 45–30	1–0	Pittsburg, Kansas
December 9, 1944*		Blytheville AAB	W 76–45	2–0	Men's Gymnasium; Fayetteville, Arkansas
December 16, 1944*		vs. City College of New York	W 59–47	3–0	Madison Square Garden; New York, New York
December 19, 1944*		at Westminster College	L 61–71	3–1	New Wilmington, Pennsylvania
December 27, 1944*		vs. Denver; All College Tournament	W 50–36	4–1	Municipal Auditorium; Oklahoma City, Oklahoma
December 28, 1944*		vs. Oklahoma; All College Tournament	W 54–51	5–1	Municipal Auditorium; Oklahoma City, Oklahoma
December 29, 1944*		vs. Oklahoma A&M; All College Tournament	L 34–43	5–2	Municipal Auditorium; Oklahoma City, Oklahoma
January 5, 1945		Baylor	W 94–28	6–2 (1–0)	Men's Gymnasium; Fayetteville, Arkansas
January 6, 1945		Baylor	W 90–30	7–2 (2–0)	Men's Gymnasium; Fayetteville, Arkansas
January 9, 1945*		Phillips 66ers	L 40–60	7–3 (2–0)	Men's Gymnasium; Fayetteville, Arkansas
January 12, 1945*		vs. Oklahoma A&M	W 41–38	8–3 (2–0)	Little Rock, Arkansas
January 13, 1945*		vs. Oklahoma A&M	L 40–49	8–4 (2–0)	El Dorado, Arkansas
January 19, 1945		at Texas	L 40–49	8–5 (2–1)	Gregory Gymnasium; Austin, Texas
January 20, 1945		at Texas	W 74–38	9–5 (3–1)	Gregory Gymnasium; Austin, Texas
January 26, 1945		at Rice	L 46–57	9–6 (3–2)	Houston, Texas
January 27, 1945		at Rice	L 56–69	9–7 (3–3)	Houston, Texas
February 2, 1945		at TCU	W 37–33	10–7 (4–3)	TCU Fieldhouse; Fort Worth, Texas
February 3, 1945		at TCU	W 60–35	11–7 (5–3)	TCU Fieldhouse; Fort Worth, Texas
February 8, 1945*		Kansas State Teachers College of Pittsburg	W 76–45	12–7 (5–3)	Men's Gymnasium; Fayetteville, Arkansas
February 16, 1945		at SMU	W 59–52	13–7 (6–3)	Perkins Gymnasium; Dallas, Texas
February 17, 1945		at SMU	W 65–49	14–7 (7–3)	Perkins Gymnasium; Dallas, Texas
February 23, 1945		Texas A&M	W 80–21	15–7 (8–3)	Men's Gymnasium; Fayetteville, Arkansas
February 24, 1945		Texas A&M	W 87–36	16–7 (9–3)	Men's Gymnasium; Fayetteville, Arkansas
February 28, 1945*		at Phillips 66ers	L 34–62	16–8 (9–3)	Bartlesville High School; Bartlesville, Oklahoma
NCAA Tournament
March 23, 1945*		vs. Oregon; Elite Eight	W 79–76	17–8 (9–3)	Municipal Auditorium; Kansas City, Missouri
March 24, 1945*		vs. Oklahoma A&M; Final Four	L 41–68	17–9 (9–3)	Municipal Auditorium; Kansas City, Missouri
*Non-conference game. ^{#}Rankings from AP Poll. (#) Tournament seedings in parentheses. All times are in Central Time.
