= 1944–45 Baylor Bears basketball team =

American college basketball season

1944–45 Baylor Bears men's basketball
- Conference: Southwest Conference
- Record: 0-17 (0-12 SWC)
- Head coach: Van Sweet

1944–45 Southwest Conference men's basketball standings
	Conf.				Overall
Team	W		L	PCT	W		L	PCT
Rice	12	–	0	1.000	20	–	1	.952
Arkansas	9	–	3	.750	17	–	9	.654
SMU	7	–	5	.583	11	–	10	.524
TCU	7	–	5	.583	9	–	20	.310
Texas	5	–	7	.417	10	–	10	.500
Texas A&M	2	–	10	.167	3	–	18	.143
Baylor	0	–	12	.000	0	–	17	.000

The 1944-45 Baylor Bears basketball team represented the Baylor University during the 1944-45 college men's basketball season.

== Schedule ==
Date time, TV	Opponent	Result	Record	Site city, state
*	Oklahoma A&M	L 16-63	0-1	Oklahoma City, OK
*	West Texas State	L 41-56	0-2	Oklahoma City, OK
*	Texas Tech	L 38-56	0-3	Oklahoma City, OK
*	Lackland AFB	L 19-49	0-4	Waco, TX
*	Waco AFB	L 23-62	0-5	Waco, TX
	at Arkansas	L 30-90	0-6	Fayetteville, AR
	at Arkansas	L 28-94	0-7	Fayetteville, AR
	Texas	L 36-54	0-8	Waco, TX
	Texas A&M	L 30-42	0-9	Waco, TX
	at SMU	L 34-56	0-10	Dallas, TX
	SMU	L 33-62	0-11	Waco, TX
	at Rice	L 24-95	0-12	Houston, TX
	at Texas	L 22-54	0-13	Austin, TX
	at Texas A&M	L 28-29	0-14	College Station, TX
	Rice	L 26-68	0-15	Waco, TX
	at TCU	L 25-64	0-16	Fort Worth, TX
	TCU	L 25-55	0-17	Waco, TX
*Non-conference game. (#) Tournament seedings in parentheses.
