= Arthur Cochran =

American basketball player and coach (1910–1978)

Arthur Corcoran
Biographical details
- Born: February 21, 1910; Medford, Massachusetts, U.S.
- Died: January 9, 1978 (aged 67); Medford, Massachusetts, U.S.

Playing career

Basketball
- 1929–1932: Tufts
- Position: Center

Coaching career (HC unless noted)

Basketball
- 1934–1944: Tufts

Head coaching record
- Overall: 95–81

Arthur Maitland Cochran (February 21, 1910 – January 9, 1978) was an American basketball player and coach who was the head coach at Tufts from 1934 to 1944.

== Playing ==
Cochran was born in Medford, Massachusetts and was a standout on the Medford High School basketball team under coaches Arthur Sampson and Ben Beck. He was team captain his senior season. Cochran played center for the Tufts basketball team and was the leading scorer his sophomore year, averaging 9.9 points per game. He was elected team captain for the 1930–31 season. He earned his bachelor of science in civil engineering in 1932 and later earned a Master of Education from the Tufts graduate school.

== Coaching ==
In 1934, Cochran was appointed varsity basketball coach at Tufts. In 1944, he entered the United States Navy as a Lieutenant (junior grade) in the ordnance department. He was succeeded in the interim by his brother, Dick Cochran. Cochran was discharged in 1946, but chose to take a full-time position with the United States Veterans Administration rather than return to coaching.

== Later life ==
Cochran served as the New England Regional director of the Veterans Administration until 1953, when he was named chief of program control at the Natick Army Labs. He later held the same position at Hanscom Air Force Base.

Cochran retired in 1973 and resided on Mystic Valley Parkway in Winchester, Massachusetts. He suffered a heart attack on Christmas Day 1977 and died of heart failure on January 9, 1978, at Lawrence Memorial Hospital of Medford.
