= 1934–35 NYU Violets men's basketball team =

American college basketball season

1934–35 NYU Violets men's basketball

Helms Foundation National Champions
- Conference: Independent
- Record: 18–1
- Head coach: Howard Cann
- Captain: Sidney Gross

The 1934–35 NYU Violets men's basketball team represented New York University in intercollegiate basketball during the 1934–35 season. The team finished the season with an 18–1 record. On January 5, 1935, in a game against perennial powerhouse Kentucky, the Violets edged the Wildcats by one point played at Madison Square Garden. The 1934–35 squad was led by head coach and future Basketball Hall of Famer Howard Cann, while the team captain was Sidney Gross, an athlete later inducted into the NYU hall of fame. The team was retroactively named the national champion by the Helms Athletic Foundation and was also retroactively listed as the top team of the season by the Premo-Porretta Power Poll.
