= Dick Cochran (basketball) =

American basketball player and coach (1907–1971)

Biographical details
- Born: December 22, 1907
- Died: April 24, 1971 (aged 63); Wellfleet, Massachusetts, U.S.

Playing career

Basketball
- 1931–1934: Tufts

Coaching career (HC unless noted)

Basketball
- 1944–1946: Tufts

Head coaching record
- Overall: 17–17
- Tournaments: 0–2 (NCAA)

Richard W. Cochran (December 22, 1907 – April 24, 1971) was an American basketball player and coach who was the interim head basketball coach at Tufts from 1944 to 1946.

== Biography ==
Cochran starred with his brother Arthur Cochran at Medford High School, then played for two years at the East Maine Conference Seminary. He entered Tufts University in 1930 and was captain of the basketball team and class president his senior year. He graduated from Tufts with a degree in civil engineering in 1934.

In 1938, Cochran began teaching in the Provincetown Public Schools. The following year, he became the principal at the Wellfleet Consolidated School in Wellfleet, Massachusetts. In 1944, he took a similar position in Sherborn, Massachusetts.

From 1944 to 1946, Cochran was the interim varsity basketball coach at Tufts while his brother, Arthur Cochran, was serving in the United States Navy. He led the team to an appearance in the 1945 NCAA basketball tournament.

In 1952, Cochran returned to the Wellfleet Consolidated School. He remained in Wellfleet until his death on April 24, 1971.
