= Harry Geris =

Canadian wrestler (1947–2008)

Personal information
- Born: November 22, 1947 Deurne, North Brabant, Netherlands
- Died: April 24, 2008 (aged 60) London, Ontario, Canada
- Home town: London, Ontario, Canada
Medal record
Men's Greco-Roman wrestling
Representing Canada
Pan American Games
Bronze medal – third place	1975 Mexico City	+100 kg

Harry Geris (November 22, 1947 – April 24, 2008) was a Canadian Olympic wrestler who represented Canada in the 1968, 1972, and 1976 Olympics, 1966 British Empire and Commonwealth Games and 1975 Pan American Games.

== Early life ==
Geris was born in Deurne in the Netherlands, and emigrated to Canada as a child. Geris grew up in London, Ontario along with his eight siblings, Cathy, Dorthy, Jackie, Jane, Fred, Angel, Hank, and Billy.

Geris attended Sir Adam Beck Secondary School where he tried out for numerous sporting teams including basketball and football. Harry was a member of Sir Adam Beck's wrestling team, where he earned two O.F.S.S.A. gold medals under the tutelage of wrestling coach Fred Flectcher. While at Sir Adam Beck Geris won his first of ten Canadian National Champions, which led him to representing Canada at three Olympic Games, 1968, 1972, and 1976.

== College ==
His performance in High School athletics got the attention of the Head Coach of Joliet Junior College wrestling program in Illinois, Henry Pillard. Coach Pillard recruited Geris to the Wolves wrestling squad and as a result Harry won the N.J.C.A.A Wrestling Championship in 1968. His performance at the 1968 N.J.C.A.A. Championships earned Harry a scholarship to wrestle at perennial powerhouse Oklahoma State University where placed 2nd at the Big 8 Tournament and 4th at the 1972 N.C.A.A. National Tournament, earning him All-American honors.

== Later life and death ==
Harry's love for the sport of wrestling was passed on to his three sons, Jason, Shawn, and Ryan. They all attended Sir Wilfrid Laurier Secondary School where they were members of the Laurier wrestling team. All three boys excelled in the sport and earned an impressive collection of accolades in their father's sport. Jason like his father attended Oklahoma State and eventually earned a wrestling scholarship to California's Fresno State University. Shawn attended Eastern Michigan University. Both Jason and Shawn are Canadian National Champions in the sport of wrestling.

Harry Geris started a London wrestling club in the 1980s called AWOLS (Amateur Wrestling of London South). He travelled the team around North America developing some of the best wrestlers in the country, and lead kids to obtain scholarships with wrestling. His team was large but he managed to be a part of every one of his wrestler's lives. He helped pay for the team by running bingo's and selling wrestling gear, and donated everything to help the team go to tournaments, and camps. The AWOL team was a multiple attendant of Lock Haven Wrestling Camp, one of the best camps in the US. Harry Geris had no troubles driving thousands of miles to go to a single tournament for his wrestlers. Geris was inducted into the U.S. National Junior College Wrestling Hall of Fame in 1980 and the Canadian Amateur Wrestling Hall of Fame in May 1984.

Geris remained involved in amateur wrestling until his death. Geris was found dead by a construction worker at 7.30am on April 24, 2008, behind Saunders Secondary School in London, Ontario where he was delivering wrestling mats for an upcoming tournament. Police did not suspect foul play, but said an autopsy would be conducted to determine the cause of death. Geris was aged 60.

The Harry Geris Memorial Grappling Games were named in his honor, beginning in January 2009. The Harry Geris Memorial Grappling Games were the first in Canada to combine freestyle and Greco-Roman wrestling, Brazilian jiu-jitsu and FILA rules no-gi grappling. The weblog, harrygerisstory.blogspot.com, is dedicated to the life of Harry Geris, and features personal stories, articles and photos that are to appear in a future biographical book entitled, "The Harry Geris Story" being authored by his son, Shawn.

== Awards ==
1966 - Canadian Freestyle Champion, Commonwealth Games (Jamaica) – 4th place, World Championships (Toledo, Ohio)

1967 - Canadian Freestyle Championships – Silver medalist(213.5 lbs)

1968 - N.J.C.A.A. Champion for Joliet Junior College (Illinois) Canadian Freestyle Champion

1969 - N.J.C.A.A. Runner-up for Joliet Junior College (Illinois)

1971 - United States Wrestling Federation – Silver medalist

1972 - N.C.A.A. Championships – 4th place(All-American Status) wrestled for Oklahoma State, National AAU/USA – Silver medalist, Canadian Olympic Team (Munich, Germany) 230 lbs – 9th place

1973 - Canadian Freestyle & Greco Roman Champion, FISU Games (Moscow, Russia) – 4th place, World Championships (Iran) World Cup - Bronze medalist (Toledo, Ohio)

1974 - Eastern United States AAU Champion, Canadian Freestyle & Greco Roman Champion

1975 - Canadian Freestyle & Greco Roman Champion, Pan American Games (Mexico) – 4th place Freestyle & Bronze medalist Greco Roman

1976 - Canadian Championships Freestyle Silver medalist & Greco Roman Champion, Member of the Canadian Olympic Team

1980 - Inducted into the United States Junior College Wrestling Hall of Fame

1984 - Inducted into the Canadian Amateur Wrestling Hall of Fame

Oklahoma State University - Season Record for Harry Geris - 1972 Bouts:26 Wins:19 Loses:5 Ties:2 Falls:11 Win Pct:76.0%

Oklahoma State University - Dual Meet Record for Harry Geris - 1972 Bouts:14 Wins:10 Loses:2 Ties:2 Win Pct:78.6%

== See also ==
- List of Oklahoma State University Olympians
