= Michele Smith (softball) =

American softball player

Personal information
- Born: June 21, 1967 (age 59) Califon, New Jersey, U.S.
- Education: Oklahoma State University (1989)

Sport
- Sport: Softball
- College team: Oklahoma State Cowgirls

Medal record

Women's softball

Representing United States

Olympic Games
Gold medal – first place	1996 Atlanta	Team competition
Gold medal – first place	2000 Sydney	Team competition

Michele Mary Smith (born June 21, 1967) is an American, former collegiate All-American, two-time medal-winning Olympian, international professional left-handed hitting fastpitch softball pitcher and current sports commentator, originally from Califon, New Jersey. Smith played her college career for the Oklahoma State Cowgirls for the years 1986–89, where she set numerous records in the now defunct Big Eight Conference. She is also a double Olympic Softball gold medalist with Team USA, having played in the 1996 and 2000 Summer Olympics. She has been ESPN's lead college softball color analyst since 1998. In 2012, Smith became the first woman to serve as commentator for a nationally televised Major League Baseball game. Smith is a USA Softball Hall of Fame honoree.

== Early life and education ==
Smith started playing softball at the age of five. She attended Voorhees High School in Glen Gardner, New Jersey, where she set school records for wins, strikeouts and no-hitters. She continued her pitching career at Oklahoma State University, earning a Bachelor of Science in health and wellness.

On July 21, 1986, while Smith's father was driving her home from an oral surgeon's appointment, the sleeping Smith was thrown from the truck when her door opened on a turn. She was thrown into a roadside post, chopping off part of her elbow bone and tearing her triceps from her left arm, which severed the muscle and nerve endings in her golden pitching arm. The accident forced her to not only face the trauma of her injury, but also the end of her life as she had known it. "It was like losing my identity," she says. Her life was far from over: after nine intensive months of rehab she made her comeback as a pitcher at Oklahoma State University. She returned throwing 3 mph faster than before the accident.

== Oklahoma State Cowgirls ==
Smith debuted in 1986 and led the team in wins and batting average to earn First-Team Big Eight Conference honors. For her sophomore year, she posted a top-5 school season ERA to lead the team.

For her junior year, Smith was named a National Fastpitch Coaches Association First-Team All-American to accompany her second top conference honors. She broke school records for strikeouts, shutouts and wins while also posting career bests in average, RBIs, hits, slugging percentage, walks and home runs, the latter of which she tied for the NCAA lead that year. Smith also pitched four no-hitters, the first coming on March 6 over the Sam Houston State Bearkats.

In her final year, Smith achieved top honors from both the conference and the NFCA for a second straight year. She also attained a conference pitching Triple Crown for leading in wins, strikeouts and ERA, all being career bests. Her strikeouts, shutouts and strikeout ratio (8.5) totals were then new school records; the ratio was atop the NCAA list for that year. Smith added five more no-hitters, two of them perfect games; the total overall tied the second most for an NCAA season (now top-5) and gave her 9 overall to rank top-5 for an NCAA career. She is still tied for 10th most on the NCAA list.

Smith set a career and school high with 17 strikeouts in a 2–0 regulation win vs. the Louisiana Tech Lady Techsters on April 15. She led the Cowgirls to a No. 2 ranking at the 1989 Women's College World Series, where she opened with a 15-strikeout, three-hitter against the Toledo Rockets on May 25. Following a shutout of the Arizona Wildcats the team lost back-to-back games on May 27, with the Fresno State Bulldogs eliminating them from the series. Smith would earn All-Tournament honors for her performance.

Smith graduated with the school record for wins, strikeouts, shutouts, innings pitched, no-hitters, RBIs, home runs and triples for a Cowgirl career, as well as ranking top-5 in numerous other categories. She still holds the record for wins, no-hitters and perfect games.

== Personal life ==
Smith has also played basketball and field hockey. She is often called Smitty, Lefty, and Silky (for her "silky" arm swing).

== Statistics ==
=== Oklahoma State Cowgirls ===
Year	W	L	GP	GS	CG	SHO	SV	IP	H	R	ER	BB	SO	ERA	WHIP
1986	12	6	18	17	11	8	0	131.1	87	29	24	43	67	1.28	0.99
1987	18	5	23	23	13	5	0	161.0	--	--	19	--	75	0.82	--
1988	26	6	36	30	26	16	1	218.2	102	32	18	51	218	0.57	0.70
1989	26	3	33	27	25	17	1	196.1	83	21	15	40	240	0.53	0.62
Totals	82	20	108	97	75	46	2	707.1	+272	+82	76	+134	600	0.75	+0.74

=== Team USA Olympic Softball ===
Year	W	L	GP	GS	CG	SHO	SV	IP	H	R	ER	BB	SO	ERA	WHIP
1996	2	0	2	2	2	0	0	14.0	8	3	3	3	23	1.50	0.78
2000	0	2	3	2	1	0	0	27.2	9	4	0	5	37	0.00	0.51
Totals	2	2	5	4	3	0	0	41.2	17	7	3	8	60	0.51	0.60

== Honors ==
- New Jersey State Interscholastic Athletic Association Hall of Fame (1998)
- Shasta County, California Sports Hall of Fame
- Amateur Softball Association Hall of Fame (2006)
- Eight-time Japan Pro Softball League champion and MVP

== Associated teams ==
- Team USA, 1992–2002
- Redding Rebels, 1993–1995
- Toyota Shokki (Japanese Professional Softball League), 1993–2008
- New York/New Jersey Juggernaut (NPF), 2001 and 2004

== See also ==
- List of Oklahoma State University Olympians
- NCAA Division I softball career sub-1.00 ERA list
