= List of Oklahoma State University Olympians =

Since the 1924 Olympics, 68 Oklahoma State University Olympians have won a total of 31 medals: 20 gold, four silver, and seven bronze. Oklahoma State University has been represented in every Olympics that the United States has competed in since 1924.

== 1924 - Paris ==
- Guy Lookabaugh - wrestled at 158.5 and received 4th place
- Orion Stuteville - wrestling participant

== 1928 - Amsterdam ==
- Clarence Berryman - wrestled at 145 and received 6th place
- George Rule - wrestling participant
- Charles Strack - wrestling participant
- Earl McCready - wrestling participant for Team Canada at Heavyweight

== 1932 - Los Angeles ==
- Bobby Pearce - won gold medal at 123 in wrestling
- Jack VanBebber - won gold medal at 158.5 in wrestling
- Melvin Clodfelter - wrestling participant at 145
- Conrald Caldwell - wrestling participant

== 1936 - Berlin ==
- Frank Lewis - won gold medal at 158.5 in wrestling
- Ross Flood - won silver medal at 123 in wrestling
- Roy Dunn - wrestling participant at Heavyweight
- Fred Parkey - wrestling participant
- Harley Strong - wrestling participant at 145
- George Chiga - wrestling participant for Team Canada at Heavyweight
- Edward Clark Gallagher - honorary coach
- Clarence Gallagher - trainer

== 1948 - London ==
- Bob Kurland - won gold medal as member of USA Basketball Team
- Jesse Renick - won gold medal as member of USA Basketball Team
- Hal Moore - wrestled at 136.5 and received 6th place
- William Jernigan - wrestling participant at 114.5
- Richard Hutton - wrestling participant at Heavyweight
- Art Griffith - coached the USA Wrestling Team
- Cliff Keen - manager for USA Wrestling Team

== 1952 - Helsinki ==
- Bob Kurland - won gold medal as a member of USA Basketball Team
- J.W. Mashburn - participated in track and field
- Raymond Swartz - coached the USA Wrestling Team
- Buel Patterson - manager for USA Wrestling Team

== 1956 - Melbourne ==
- J.W. Mashburn - won gold medal in the 1600 meter relay
- Myron Roderick - wrestled at 136.5 and received 4th place
- Dick Beattie - wrestling participant at 160.5
- Dr. James Graham - track and field team (pole vault)

== 1960 - Rome ==
- Doug Blubaugh - won gold medal in wrestling at 160.5
- Shelby Wilson - won gold medal in wrestling at 147.5

== 1964 - Tokyo ==
- Yojiro Uetake - won gold medal in wrestling at 125.5
- Bobby Douglas - wrestled at 138.5 and received 4th place
- Henry Iba - coached the USA Basketball Team
- Rex Perry - coached the USA Wrestling Team
- Myron Roderick - assistant coach for the USA Wrestling Team
- Fendley Collins - manager for the USA Wrestling Team

== 1968 - Mexico City ==
- Yojiro Uetake - won gold medal in wrestling at 125.5
- James King - won gold medal as member of USA Basketball Team
- Bobby Douglas - wrestling participant at 138.5
- Henry Iba - coached the USA Basketball Team
- Dr. Donald Cooper - physician for the USA Basketball Team
- Tom Von Ruden - 1,500m, finished ninth

== 1972 - Munich ==
- Gene Davis - wrestling participant at 136.5
- J. Robinson - Greco-Roman wrestling participant at 180.5
- Harry Geris - wrestled for Team Canada at Heavyweight
- Henry Iba - coached the USA Basketball Team

== 1976 - Montreal ==
- Gene Davis - won bronze medal in wrestling at 136.5
- Jimmy Jackson - wrestling participant at Heavyweight
- Harry Geris - wrestled for Team Canada at Heavyweight
- Chris McCubbins - participated for Team Canada in track and field

== 1984 - Los Angeles ==
- Gary Green - won gold medal as member of USA Baseball Team
- Bruce Baumgartner, grad student and assistant coach - won gold medal in wrestling
- Lee Roy Smith - wrestling participant at 136.5
- Henry Iba - coach of USA Basketball Team
- Bill McDaniel - doctor for USA Basketball Team

== 1988 - Seoul ==
- John Smith - won gold medal in wrestling at 136.5
- Kenny Monday - won gold medal in wrestling at 163
- Robin Ventura - won gold medal as member of USA Baseball Team
- Christine McMiken - participated in track and field for New Zealand
- Joe Seay - assistant coach for USA Wrestling Team

== 1992 - Barcelona ==
- John Smith - won gold medal in wrestling at 136.5
- Kenny Monday - won silver medal in wrestling at 163
- Kendall Cross - wrestling participant at 125.5
- Lee Roy Smith - coach of the USA Wrestling Team
- Bobby Douglas - coach of the USA Wrestling Team

== 1996 - Atlanta ==
- Michele Mary Smith - won gold medal as member of USA Softball Team
- Kendall Cross - won gold medal in wrestling at 125.5
- Kenny Monday - wrestled at 163 and received 6th place

== 2000 - Sydney ==
- Michele Mary Smith - won gold medal as member of USA Softball Team
- John Smith - coach of the USA Wrestling Team

== 2004 - Athens ==
- Daniel Cormier - wrestled
- Eric Guerrero - wrestled
- Jamill Kelly - won silver medal in wrestling
- Mindaugas Pukstas - participated for Lithuania in the marathon

== 2008 - Beijing ==
- Melanie Roche - won bronze medal in softball competing for Australia
- Lauren Bay - competed for Canada in softball
- Daniel Cormier - wrestling
- Steve Mocco - advanced to the quarterfinals in wrestling

== 2012 - London ==
- Coleman Scott - won bronze medal in wrestling at 60 kg
- John Smith - coached Team USA Wrestling

== 2016 - Rio de Janeiro ==
- Rickie Fowler - golf
- Caroline Masson - competed for Germany in golf
- Pernilla Lindberg - competed for Sweden in golf
- Shadrack Kipchirchir - men's 10,000m
- Ingeborg Loevnes - competed for Norway in Women's 3000m Steeplechase
- Nick Miller - competed for Great Britain in men's hammer throw
- Tom Farrell - competed for Great Britain in men's 5000m
- John Smith - wrestling TV analyst during the Games

== 2016 - Rio de Janeiro Paralympics ==
- Cassie Mitchell - won silver medalin discus throw and bronze medal in club throw

== 2020 - Tokyo ==
- Adrianna Franch - won bronze medal with USA Women's Soccer Team
- Caroline Masson - competed for Germany in golf
- Alex Norén - competed for Sweden in golf
- Viktor Hovland - competed for Norway in golf
- Nick Miller - competed for Great Britain in men's hammer throw and finished sixth
- Lauren Bay-Regula - won bronze medal with Canadian softball team
- John Smith (wrestling) and Michele Smith (softball) - TV analysts during the Games
