= Oklahoma State Cowboys basketball =

Basketball team in Stillwater Oklahoma

Oklahoma State Cowboys men's basketball
2026–27 Oklahoma State Cowboys basketball team
- University: Oklahoma State University–Stillwater
- First season: 1907–08; 119 years ago
- Athletic director: Chad Weiberg
- Head coach: Steve Lutz; 3rd season, 37–33 (.529)
- Location: Stillwater, Oklahoma
- Arena: Gallagher-Iba Arena (capacity: 13,611)
- NCAA division: Division I
- Conference: Big 12
- Nickname: Cowboys
- Colors: Orange and black
- All-time record: 1,783–1,284 (.581)
- NCAA tournament record: 39–28 (.582)

NCAA Division I tournament champions
- 1945, 1946
Other NCAA Division I tournament results
Runner-up	1949
Final Four	1945, 1946, 1949, 1951, 1995, 2004
Elite Eight	1945, 1946, 1949, 1951, 1953, 1954, 1958, 1965, 1995, 2000, 2004
Sweet Sixteen	1945, 1946, 1949, 1951, 1953, 1954, 1958, 1965, 1991, 1992, 1995, 2000, 2004, 2005
Appearances	1945, 1946, 1949, 1951, 1953, 1954, 1958, 1965, 1983, 1991, 1992, 1993, 1994, 1995, 1998, 1999, 2000, 2001, 2002, 2003, 2004, 2005, 2009, 2010, 2013, 2014, 2015, 2017, 2021

Conference tournament champions
- Big Eight: 1983, 1995 Big 12: 2004, 2005

Conference regular-season champions
- SWC: 1925 MVC: 1931, 1936, 1937, 1938, 1939, 1940, 1942, 1944, 1945, 1946, 1948, 1949, 1951, 1953, 1954 Big Eight: 1965, 1991 Big 12: 2004

Uniforms
Home	Away

The Oklahoma State Cowboys basketball team represents Oklahoma State University in Stillwater, Oklahoma, United States in NCAA Division I men's basketball competition. The Cowboys currently compete in the Big 12 Conference.

Oklahoma State men’s basketball has a very rich history of success, having won consecutive NCAA National Championships in 1945 and 1946. The Cowboys have also been to six Final Fours, 11 Elite Eights and 14 Sweet Sixteens over a total of 29 NCAA tournament appearances. Oklahoma State has also won a combined total of 23 conference titles, with their most recent title coming in the 2005 Big 12 tournament. In 2020, CBS Sports ranked Oklahoma State the 25th best college basketball program of all-time, ahead of programs such as Oklahoma and Texas.

Since 1938, the Cowboys have played their home games in Gallagher-Iba Arena. The Cowboys are currently led by Steve Lutz, in his 3rd season after he was hired as head coach on April 1, 2024.

== History ==
Oklahoma State University (then Oklahoma A&M College) began varsity intercollegiate competition in men's basketball in 1908. The Cowboys (including the predecessor Aggies teams) rank 40th in total victories among all NCAA Division I college basketball programs, with an all-time win–loss record of 1,748–1,249 (.583) at the end of 2023–24 season.

The Cowboys (including the predecessor Aggies teams) have made 29 total appearances in the NCAA tournament (39–28 overall record), reaching the NCAA Final Four six times (1945, 1946, 1949, 1951, 1995, 2004) and the NCAA regional finals (Elite Eight) eleven times. Oklahoma State (then Oklahoma A&M College) won the NCAA Championship in 1945 and 1946. The Cowboys rank eleventh (tied with six other programs) in all-time Final Four appearances and tenth (tied with five others) in total NCAA Championships.

=== The early years (1907–34) ===
Under nine head coaches in this period, Oklahoma A&M found very little success, with only six winning seasons. Very little success was found early on and after a 6–15 season under first-year head coach John Maulbetsch, things were not looking well. However, in the next three seasons Maulbetsch turned around the program, leading the Aggies to a 41–20 record culminating with a first-place finish in their last season in the Southwest Conference. The move to the Missouri Valley Conference in 1925 would halt the progress under this budding coach however, and after Maulbetsch resigned from the positions of football, baseball and basketball coach, the Aggies would not have another winning season until Henry Iba took the reins in 1934. However, despite an overall record of 7–9, the Aggies did win the Missouri Valley Conference Co-Championship in 1930–31 under Coach George E. Rody with a conference record of 5–3.

This period in Oklahoma State basketball history was marked with mainly football coaches heading the football, baseball and basketball teams.

Coach	Record	Seasons
Boyd Hill	2–3	1
William Schrieber	4–5	2
Paul Davis	15–16	3
John Griffith	18–12	2
Earl Pritchard	11–15	2
James Pixlee	3–21	2
John Maulbetsch	75–74	8
George E. Rody	8–24	2
Harold James	13–42	3

=== Henry Iba era (1934–70) ===
The 1945 Oklahoma A&M Aggies National Championship basketball team

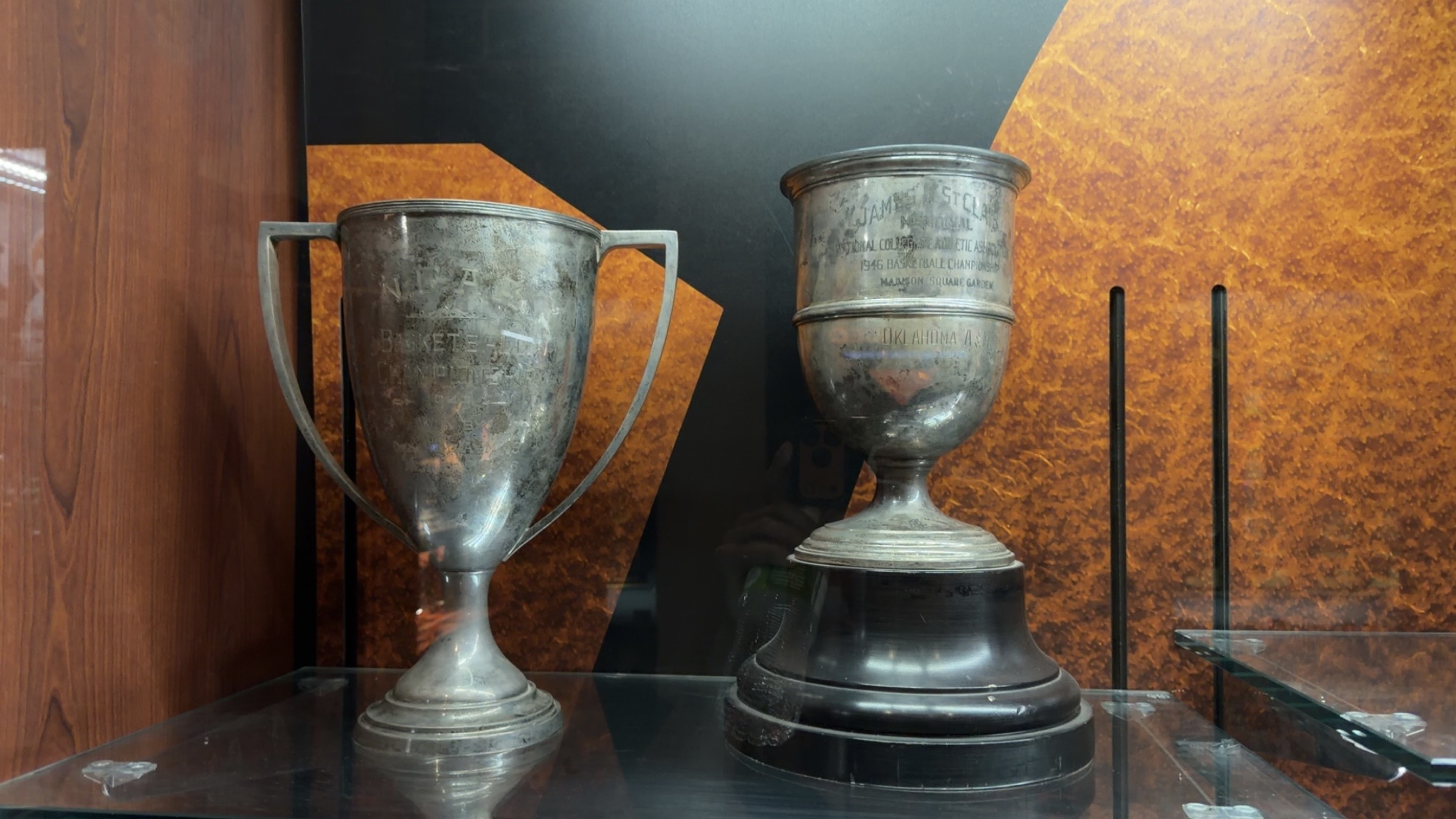
1945 and 1946 NCAA National Championship Trophies won by Oklahoma State

Henry Iba came to Oklahoma A&M College in 1934, where he remained for 36 years, retiring after the 1969–70 season. For most of his tenure at A&M/OSU, he doubled as athletic director.

Iba's teams were methodical, ball-controlling units that featured weaving patterns and low scoring games. Iba's "swinging gate" defense (a man-to-man with team flow) was applauded by many, and is still effective in today's game. He was known as "the Iron Duke of Defense".

Iba's Aggies became the first to win consecutive NCAA national championship titles (in 1945 and 1946). They beat NYU in the 1945 national championship and North Carolina in the 1946 national championship. He was voted coach of the year in both seasons. His two national title teams were led by Bob Kurland, the game's first seven-foot player. Additionally, Iba's 1945 team defeated National Invitation Tournament champion, DePaul, and 6' 9" center George Mikan in a classic Red Cross Benefit game. Iba's 1949 and 1951 teams also reached the Final Four of the NCAA Tournament.

In conference play, Oklahoma A&M/Oklahoma State teams won 655 games, 14 Missouri Valley championships, and one Big Eight championship in 36 seasons with Iba as head men's basketball coach.

"Mr. Iba," as he is still popularly known at OSU, remained a fixture on campus until his death in 1993, often giving advice to players during practice. One seat in the southeast concourse level of Gallagher-Iba Arena (which was renamed in his honor in 1987) remains unused in his honor.

=== 1970–90 ===
The mostly subpar results of Iba's final decade in Stillwater largely remained the status quo for Oklahoma State during the two decades following his retirement. From the 1970–71 to 1989–90 seasons, the Cowboys finished with winning records only six times, finished in the top half of the Big Eight Conference standings only three times, and earned a berth in the NCAA tournament only once.

=== Eddie Sutton era (1990–2006) ===
After being an assistant for the Cowboys in 1958–59, Eddie Sutton returned to Oklahoma State in 1990 to coach. In the years leading up to his hiring, the team had made postseason play only three times since joining the Big Eight Conference in 1957.

The Cowboys began to turn around almost immediately with Sutton's presence, and in 1991, Oklahoma State returned to the NCAA Tournament, winning their first NCAA Tournament game since making the Elite Eight in 1965. Sutton’s Cowboys advanced all the way to the Sweet Sixteen during his first two seasons. In 1995, the Pokes, under the leadership of Bryant "Big Country" Reeves and Randy Rutherford, captured the Big Eight Conference Tournament and clinched a bid to the 1995 NCAA Division I men's basketball tournament. They advanced to the Final Four in Seattle, Washington, where they lost to eventual national champion UCLA. It was the Cowboys' deepest advance in the tournament since 1951.

Led by John Lucas III, Joey Graham, and 2004 Big 12 Player of the Year Tony Allen, Sutton's 2003–04 team finished with a school-record 31 wins (31–4), won both the Big 12 regular season and tournament championships, and advanced to the Final Four as a No. 2 seed in the 2004 NCAA tournament. The Cowboys finished the season ranked No. 4 in the final AP Poll and Coaches' Poll.

In his 16 seasons in Stillwater, the Cowboys reached the postseason 15 times (having declined an NIT bid in Sutton's sixth season as head coach), including 13 NCAA Tournament bids and two Final Four appearances. They also captured three regular-season conference titles and three conference tournament championships. Sutton finished his career at OSU as the second-winningest coach in school history, behind only his mentor, Iba.

==== 2001 plane crash ====
On January 27, 2001, one of three planes carrying Oklahoma State staff and players crashed in a snow storm near Byers, Colorado, killing all 10 on board. The plane was on its way back from a loss against the University of Colorado. Those killed included Nate Fleming, a redshirt freshman guard; Dan Lawson, a junior guard; Bill Teegins, radio sportscaster of OSU basketball and sports anchor on CBS affiliate KWTV-9 in Oklahoma City; Kendall Durfey, television and radio engineer; Will Hancock, media relations coordinator; Pat Noyes, director of basketball operations; Brian Luinstra, athletic trainer; Jared Weiberg, student assistant; Denver Mills, pilot; and Bjorn Falistrom, co-pilot.

Since 2007, Oklahoma State has honored these ten during an annual 5k and 10K race called the Remember the Ten Run.

=== Sean Sutton era (2006–08) ===
Eddie Sutton's son, Sean Sutton, also a former Cowboy player, took over head coaching duties in 2006. Following a record of 39–29 which included a 13–19 mark in Big 12 play during his first two seasons, Sutton resigned under pressure after a March 31, 2008, meeting with Athletic Director Mike Holder.

=== Travis Ford era (2008–16) ===
On April 16, 2008, Travis Ford was hired as the 18th men's basketball head coach at Oklahoma State. He resigned from the same position with the UMass Minutemen to take the position. At the time of his hiring, he had a Division I coaching record of 123–115. Ford also coached at Eastern Kentucky and Campbellsville University (NAIA). As a player, he was coached by Norm Stewart at the University of Missouri as a freshman. He transferred after his freshman season and played for three years (1992–94) at the University of Kentucky under Rick Pitino.

Ford was fired on March 18, 2016 after a season in which the Cowboys went 3–15 in Big 12 play and 12–20 overall. Although he led the Cowboys to five NCAA tournaments in his eight seasons in charge, he never finished higher than third in conference play, and finished sixth or worse in the Big 12 seven times.

=== Brad Underwood era (2016–2017) ===
Three days after Ford's firing, Oklahoma State hired Brad Underwood from Stephen F. Austin State University (SFA). He began his coaching career at Kansas State, first serving as director of basketball operations for a season and then serving as an assistant for five more. Underwood then went to South Carolina as an assistant for a season before being hired to his first head coaching post at SFA. During his three seasons in charge, the Lumberjacks went 89–14 overall and 53–1 in Southland Conference regular-season play, making the NCAA tournament all three seasons and advancing to the second round twice. Underwood's 89 wins tie him with Brad Stevens for the most wins by a men's basketball head coach in his first three seasons at an NCAA school. He is also the first coach to be named Southland Conference Coach of the Year three consecutive times. On March 18, 2017 Brad Underwood was hired at Illinois. During the 2016-17 season, Associate head coach Lamont Evans was engaged in bribery scheme that came to light in 2017. Evans was sentenced to three months in prison in June 2019 for his participation in the scheme, which he also conducted at the University of South Carolina. In June 2020 press release, the NCAA announced a postseason ban for 2020–21.

=== Mike Boynton era (2017–2024) ===
The school promoted assistant coach Mike Boynton Jr. to head coach on March 24, 2017. Under Boynton, Oklahoma State only managed to reach the NCAA tournament once. Led by Big 12 Player of the Year Cade Cunningham, the Cowboys earned a 4-seed in the 2021 NCAA tournament, where they defeated Liberty in the First Round before being upset by Oregon State in the Second Round. Oklahoma State would never make it back to the tournament under Boynton, and he was fired on March 14, 2024, after a 13th place conference finish and first round exit from the Big 12 Tournament. Boynton finished with a 119–109 (.522) record, including 51–75 (.405) in conference play.

=== Steve Lutz era (2024–present) ===
Steve Lutz was announced as the head coach on April 1, 2024. In his first year, the Cowboys went 7–13 in the Big 12 and 17–18 overall, earning a bid to the NIT, where they fell in the quarterfinals to North Texas. In his second year, the Cowboys improved on their win total from the previous year, going 20–15 with a 6–12 mark in conference play. They again accepted a bid to the NIT, losing in the second round to Wichita State.

== Postseason ==
=== NCAA tournament results ===
The Cowboys have appeared in the NCAA tournament 29 times. Their combined record is 39–28. Oklahoma State has been to six Final Fours, and they were National Champions in 1945 and 1946.

Year	Seed	Round	Opponent	Result
1945		Elite Eight; Final Four; National Championship	Utah; Arkansas; NYU	W 62–37; W 68–41; W 49–45
1946		Elite Eight; Final Four; National Championship	Baylor; California; North Carolina	W 44–29; W 52–35; W 43–40
1949		Elite Eight; Final Four; National Championship	Wyoming; Oregon State; Kentucky	W 40–39; W 55–30; L 36–46
1951		Sweet Sixteen; Elite Eight; Final Four; National 3rd Place Game	Montana State; Washington; Kansas State; Illinois	W 50–46; W 61–57; L 44–68; L 46–61
1953		Sweet Sixteen; Elite Eight	TCU; Kansas	W 71–54; L 55–61
1954		Sweet Sixteen; Elite Eight	Rice; Bradley	W 51–45; L 57–71
1958		First Round; Sweet Sixteen; Elite Eight	Loyola (LA); Arkansas; Kansas State	W 59–42; W 65–40; L 57–69
1965		Sweet Sixteen; Elite Eight	Houston; Wichita State	W 75–60; L 46–54
1983	#5	First Round	#12 Princeton	L 53–56
1991	#3	First Round; Second Round; Sweet Sixteen	#14 New Mexico #6 NC State #10 Temple	W 67–64; W 73–64; L 63–72^{OT}
1992	#2	First Round; Second Round; Sweet Sixteen	#15 Georgia Southern #10 Tulane #6 Michigan	W 100–73; W 87–71; L 72–75
1993	#5	First Round; Second Round	#12 Marquette #4 Louisville	W 74–62; L 63–78
1994	#4	First Round; Second Round	#13 New Mexico State #12 Tulsa	W 65–55; L 80–82
1995	#4	First Round; Second Round; Sweet Sixteen; Elite Eight; Final Four	#13 Drexel #5 Alabama #1 Wake Forest #2 Massachusetts #1 UCLA	W 73–49; W 66–52; W 71–66; W 68–54; L 61–74
1998	#8	First Round; Second Round	#9 George Washington #1 Duke	W 74–59; L 73–79
1999	#9	First Round; Second Round	#8 Syracuse #1 Auburn	W 69–61; L 74–81
2000	#3	First Round; Second Round; Sweet Sixteen; Elite Eight	#14 Hofstra #11 Pepperdine #10 Seton Hall #5 Florida	W 86–66; W 75–67; W 68–66; L 65–77
2001	#11	First Round	#6 USC	L 54–69
2002	#7	First Round	#10 Kent State	L 61–69
2003	#6	First Round; Second Round	#11 Penn #3 Syracuse	W 77–63; L 56–68
2004	#2	First Round; Second Round; Sweet Sixteen; Elite Eight; Final Four	#15 Eastern Washington #7 Memphis #3 Pittsburgh #1 Saint Joseph's #3 Georgia Tech	W 75–56; W 70–53; W 63–51; W 64–62; L 65–67
2005	#2	First Round; Second Round; Sweet Sixteen	#15 Southeastern Louisiana #7 Southern Illinois #3 Arizona	W 63–50; W 85–77; L 78–79
2009	#8	First Round; Second Round	#9 Tennessee #1 Pittsburgh	W 77–75; L 76–84
2010	#7	First Round	#10 Georgia Tech	L 59–64
2013	#5	First Round	#12 Oregon	L 55–68
2014	#9	First Round	#8 Gonzaga	L 77–85
2015	#9	First Round	#8 Oregon	L 73–79
2017	#10	First Round	#7 Michigan	L 91–92
2021	#4	First Round; Second Round	#13 Liberty #12 Oregon State	W 69–60; L 70–80

=== NCAA tournament seeding history ===
The NCAA began seeding the tournament with the 1979 edition.

Years	'83	'91	'92	'93	'94	'95	'98	'99	'00	'01	'02	'03	'04	'05	'09	'10	'13	'14	'15	'17	'21
Seeds →	5	3	2	5	4	4	8	9	3	11	7	6	2	2	8	7	5	9	9	10	4

=== NIT results ===
The Cowboys have appeared in the National Invitation Tournament (NIT) 15 times. Their combined record is 14–16.

Year	Round	Opponent	Result
1938	Semifinals; 3rd Place Game	Temple; NYU	L 55–56; W 37–24
1940	Semifinals; 3rd Place Game	Duquesne; DePaul	L 30–34; W 23–22
1944	Quarterfinals; Semifinals; 3rd Place Game	Canisius; DePaul; Kentucky	W 43–29; L 38–41; L 29–45
1956	First Round	Duquesne	L 61–69
1989	First Round; Second Round	Boise State; St. John's	W 69–55; L 64–76
1990	First Round; Second Round	Tulsa; New Mexico	W 83–74; L 88–90
1997	First Round; Second Round	Tulane; Michigan	W 79–72; L 65–75
2006	First Round	Miami (FL)	L 59–62
2007	First Round	Marist	L 64–67
2008	First Round	Southern Illinois	L 53–69
2011	First Round; Second Round	Harvard; Washington State	W 71–54; L 64–74
2018	First Round; Second Round; Quarterfinals	Florida Gulf Coast; Stanford; Western Kentucky	W 80–68; W 71–65; L 84–92
2023	First Round; Second Round; Quarterfinals	Youngstown State; Eastern Washington; North Texas	W 69–64; W 71–60; L 59–65^{OT}
2025	First Round; Second Round; Quarterfinals	Wichita State; SMU; North Texas	W 89–79; W 85–83; L 59–61
2026	First Round; Second Round	Davidson; Wichita State	W 84–80; L 70–96

== Facilities ==
=== Gallagher-Iba Arena ===
Gallagher-Iba Arena, once dubbed “Madison Square Garden of the Plains”, is the basketball and wrestling venue at Oklahoma State University in Stillwater, Oklahoma. Originally completed in 1938 and named the 4-H Club and Student Activities Building, it was soon renamed Gallagher Hall to honor wrestling coach, Ed Gallagher. After renovations in 1987, the name became Gallagher-Iba Arena, as a tribute to longtime basketball coach and innovator, Henry Iba. Gallagher-Iba Arena was named the best college gymnasium by CBS SportsLine.com in August 2001.

The first basketball game was played on December 9, 1938, when Iba's Oklahoma A&M Aggies beat Phog Allen’s Kansas Jayhawks, 21–15, in a battle between two of the nation's early basketball powers. In its original configuration, seating was limited to 6,381. Though small by today's standards, it was the largest collegiate facility in the country when completed. The original maple floor, still in use today, was the most expensive of its kind in America when it was installed in 1938.

Oklahoma State completed a $55 million expansion of Gallagher-Iba Arena prior to the 1999–2000 Cowboy basketball season. Rather than build a new, off-campus arena to accommodate the need for additional seating, the decision was made to expand Gallagher-Iba Arena itself to more than double its original capacity (from its 6,381-seat capacity to its current 13,611 seats). The old sightlines and the original white maple floor were kept (it remains the oldest original basketball court floor still in use).

On January 15, 2005, the court was officially named after Eddie Sutton as Eddie Sutton Court.

== Notable players ==
=== Cowboys in the Naismith Memorial Basketball Hall of Fame ===
Five members of the Naismith Memorial Basketball Hall of Fame have been associated with the Oklahoma State's men's basketball team. Some former players have been enshrined as players, while some former players have been enshrined as coaches.

==== Players ====
- Bob Kurland

==== Coaches ====
- Don Haskins (former player inducted as coaches for other programs)
- Hank Iba (inducted as a coach at Oklahoma State)
- Eddie Sutton (also a former player and former head coach of Oklahoma State)
- Bill Self (former player inducted as coach for other programs)

=== Cowboys in the National Collegiate Basketball Hall of Fame ===
Four former Oklahoma State players/coaches that have been enshrined in the National Collegiate Basketball Hall of Fame.

==== Players ====
- Bob Kurland

==== Coaches ====
- Don Haskins, also former player inducted in 2006.
- Henry Iba former coach, inducted in 2006.
- Eddie Sutton, also a former player and former head coach of Oklahoma State. (Inducted in 2011)

=== Cowboys in the NBA ===
==== Current players ====
- Cade Cunningham, basketball player and Number 1 overall draft pick in the 2021 NBA draft for the Detroit Pistons
- Marcus Smart, basketball player for the Houston Rockets. Named the NBA Defensive Player of the Year for the 2021-22 Season and 3x NBA Hustle Award recipient.
- Lindy Waters III, basketball player for the San Antonio Spurs

==== Former players ====
- Tony Allen, six-time NBA All-Defensive Team and number retired by the Memphis Grizzlies.
- Maurice Baker, former NBA point guard
- Leroy Combs, former NBA forward
- JamesOn Curry, former NBA guard
- Pete Darcey, former NBA center
- Richard Dumas, former NBA small forward
- Lonnie Eggleston, former NBA guard for the St. Louis Bombers
- Joey Graham, former NBA forward
- Stephen Graham, former NBA Swingman
- Cecil Hankins, former NBA player for St. Louis Bombers and Boston Celtics
- Bob Harris, former NBA big man
- Terrel Harris, former NBA Shooting guard
- Byron Houston, former NBA power forward
- Thomas Jordan former NBA forward for Philadelphia 76ers
- John Lucas III, former NBA point guard
- Desmond Mason, NBA Slam Dunk Contest champion (2001)
- Ivan McFarlin former NBA power forward for Philadelphia 76ers
- Doyle Parrack, former NBA player for the Chicago Stags
- Bryant Reeves, former NBA center & first draft pick for the Vancouver Grizzlies
- Melvin Sanders, former NBA swingman for the San Antonio Spurs
- John Starks, former NBA All-Star, (1997) NBA Sixth Man of the Year and all-time leader in three pointers in New York Knicks history).
- Brooks Thompson, former NBA player and college coach.
- Corey Williams, former NBA player and current Assistant Head coach of the Auburn Tigers men's basketball team.

=== Cowboys in overseas league ===
==== Current players ====
- James Anderson, basketball player for UCAM in the Spanish Liga ACB. 20th overall pick in the 2010 NBA draft.
- Markel Brown, basketball player for Napoli Basketball of the Lega Basket Serie A (LBA)
- Jawun Evans, basketball player for Maccabi Rishon LeZion of the Israeli Basketball Premier League. 2017 NBA draft 39th overall pick
- Anthony Hickey (born 1992), basketball player for Hapoel Haifa in the Israeli Basketball Premier League
- Lucas N'Guessan, basketball player for Navarra in LEB Oro
- Cameron McGriff basketball player for Le Mans in the French Pro A.

=== Cowboys basketball players notable in other fields ===
- Mason Cox, professional Australian rules footballer who plays for the Fremantle Football Club in the Australian Football League (AFL)
