= Howard Cann =

American sportsman (1895–1992)

Biographical details
- Born: October 11, 1895; Bridgeport, Connecticut, U.S.
- Died: December 18, 1992 (aged 97); Dobbs Ferry, New York, U.S.

Playing career
- 1914–1917: NYU
- 1919–1920: NYU
- Position: Forward

Coaching career (HC unless noted)

Basketball
- 1923–1958: NYU

Football
- 1932–1933: NYU

Head coaching record
- Overall: 409–232 (basketball); 7–7–1 (football)

Accomplishments and honors

Championships
- Helms championship (1935); 5 Metropolitan New York Conference (1934, 1938, 1946, 1948, 1957)
- Basketball Hall of Fame; Inducted in 1968 (profile)
- College Basketball Hall of Fame; Inducted in 2006

Howard Goodsell Cann (October 11, 1895 – December 18, 1992) was an American sportsman best known as the long-time men's basketball coach at New York University. He was also an Olympic shot putter and a college basketball and football player.

== Playing career ==
Cann was born in Bridgeport, Connecticut, into a family of accomplished sportsmen. His father, Frank Cann, was the director of physical education at New York University, which both Howard and his younger brother Tedford Cann attended. Tedford was an Olympic swimmer and world-record holder in the 200 meter freestyle.

Howard first attended Barringer High School in Newark, New Jersey, and then the High School of Commerce in New York City. At Commerce he was captain of the basketball team, member of the track team, and member of the Omega Gamma Delta fraternity.

He briefly attended Dartmouth College and then transferred to New York University. During his freshman year in 1914, Howard was the leading scorer on the NYU Violets men's basketball team. He was captain of the 1916–1917 football team, where he played as a tackle, a punter, and also played in the backfield.

Cann's college career was interrupted by World War I. He left NYU and, along with his brother Tedford, joined the United States Navy. Howard resumed his studies at NYU in 1919, after the end of the war.

In 1920, Cann led the NYU basketball team to an Amateur Athletic Union National Championship title and was named the Helms Athletic Foundation Player of the Year as well as an All-American. A group of newspaper sportswriters also named him as the greatest player in the history of basketball to that date. As a member of the track and field team, he won the shot put competitions at the Penn Relays and the IC4A Middle Atlantic States event. He participated in the 1920 Summer Olympics in Antwerp as a shot putter, finishing the competition in eighth place with a throw of 13.52 meters. He had originally been scheduled to compete as a hurdler, but broke his leg. That same year, Cann graduated from NYU with a degree in engineering.

== Coaching career ==
=== Basketball ===
Three years after graduating from NYU, Cann returned to the school as the men's basketball coach. He coached the team for thirty-five years, from 1923 to 1958, and compiled a 429–235 record before his retirement.

His time as the basketball coach included an unbeaten 1933–34 season and a December 29, 1934 game in Madison Square Garden where NYU defeated Notre Dame. This first Madison Square Garden tournament helped to elevate the popularity of college basketball. Cann's 1934–35 team finished the season with an 18–1 record, was retroactively named the national champion by the Helms Athletic Foundation, and was retroactively listed as the top team of the season by the Premo-Porretta Power Poll. He led the 1944–45 team to the final game of the National Collegiate Athletic Association tournament, but lost the championship to Oklahoma State University. Cann was named National Coach of the Year in 1947, and led the Violets to the National Invitation Tournament final the next year, but was defeated by Saint Louis University.

Cann retired in 1958, having spent 39 of the first 44 years of his adult life at NYU as a player and coach.

=== Football ===
In 1932 and 1933, Cann also coached the NYU football team. His career football coaching record at NYU was 7–7–1.

=== Accomplishments ===
In 1968, he was inducted into the Naismith Memorial Basketball Hall of Fame for his accomplishments as a coach. He also served as Director of Physical Education at NYU from 1931 to retirement in 1958 and is commemorated in seven Sports Halls of Fame.

== Personal life ==
Cann married Janet Cann in 1932, and they had a son, Howard Jr. Cann died at age 97 after a long illness. He was a resident of Irvington, New York, at the time of his death.

== Head coaching record ==
=== Basketball ===
Record table
Season	Team	Overall	Conference	Standing	Postseason
NYU Violets (Independent) (1923–1933)
1923–24	NYU	8–8			
1924–25	NYU	7–7			
1925–26	NYU	10–4			
1926–27	NYU	4–7			
1927–28	NYU	8–6			
1928–29	NYU	13–5			
1929–30	NYU	13–3			
1930–31	NYU	9–6			
1931–32	NYU	6–6			
1932–33	NYU	11–4			
NYU Violets (Metropolitan New York Conference) (1933–1934)
1933–34	NYU	16–0	9–0	1st	
NYU Violets (Independent) (1934–1935)
1934–35	NYU	18–1			Helms National Champions
NYU Violets (Metropolitan New York Conference) (1935–1939)
1935–36	NYU	14–4	7–1	2nd	
1936–37	NYU	10–6	4–2	4th	
1937–38	NYU	16–8	6–0	1st	NIT Semifinals
1938–39	NYU	11–11	11–11	9th	
NYU Violets (Independent) (1939–1942)
1939–40	NYU	18–1			
1940–41	NYU	13–6			
1941–42	NYU	12–7			
NYU Violets (Metropolitan New York Conference) (1942–1943)
1942–43	NYU	16–6	3–2	T–4th	NCAA Elite Eight
NYU Violets (Independent) (1943–1945)
1943–44	NYU	7–7			
1944–45	NYU	14–7			NCAA Runner-up
NYU Violets (Metropolitan New York Conference) (1945–1958)
1945–46	NYU	19–3	5–1	T–1st	NCAA Elite Eight
1946–47	NYU	12–9	3–3	4th	
1947–48	NYU	22–4	5–1	1st	NIT Runner-up
1948–49	NYU	12–8	3–2	T–3rd	NIT First Round
1949–50	NYU	8–11	1–4	6th	
1950–51	NYU	12–4	3–2	T–3rd	
1951–52	NYU	17–8	2–3	5th	NIT First Round
1952–53	NYU	9–11	1–3	5th	
1953–54	NYU	9–9	2–2	T–3rd	
1954–55	NYU	7–13	1–3	T–5th	
1955–56	NYU	10–8	2–2	T–3rd	
1956–57	NYU	8–13	3–1	1st	
1957–58	NYU	10–11	2–2	4th	
NYU:		409–232 (.638)	73–45 (.619)		
Total:		409–232 (.638)			
National champion Postseason invitational champion Conference regular season champion Conference regular season and conference tournament champion Division regular season champion Division regular season and conference tournament champion Conference tournament champion

=== Football ===
Year	Team	Overall	Conference	Standing	Bowl/playoffs
NYU Violets (Independent) (1932–1933)
1932	NYU	5–3			
1933	NYU	2–4–1			
NYU:		7–7–1			
Total:		7–7–1			

== See also ==
- List of NCAA Division I Men's Final Four appearances by coach
