= Arthur Sampson =

American football player and coach

Biographical details
- Born: October 24, 1898; Weymouth, Massachusetts, U.S.
- Died: March 29, 1984 (aged 85); Hingham, Massachusetts, U.S.
- Education: Tufts (1921)

Coaching career (HC unless noted)
- 1924–1925: Medford HS (MA)
- 1926–1929: Tufts
- 1930: Columbia (backfield)
- 1931–1932: Harvard (backfield)

Administrative career (AD unless noted)
- 1944–1948: Boston Yanks (GM)

Head coaching record
- Overall: 22–7–1 (college)

Arthur Graves Sampson (October 24, 1898 – March 29, 1984) was an American football coach and sportswriter who was the head football coach at Tufts University from 1926 to 1929.

== Early life ==
Sampson was born and raised in Weymouth, Massachusetts. He attended Tufts College and was manager of the school's football team for three years.

== Coaching ==
Sampson coached football, basketball, and track at Medford High School. In 1926 he became Tufts' head football coach. His 1927 team finished the season undefeated and outscored their opponents 218 to 19. He finished at Tufts with a career record of 22–7–1. After leaving Tufts, Sampson spent one season as an assistant under Lou Little at Columbia and two seasons under Eddie Casey at Harvard.

== Journalism ==
After the 1932 season, Sampson joined the staff of the Boston Herald as a sportswriter. He also authored several books, including Lou Little's Football and Ted Williams: A Biography of The Kid and wrote for national magazines. He retired from the Herald in 1965.

== Publicity work ==
In 1942, Sampson became the sports publicity director at Harvard. In 1943 he began publicizing Dartmouth Big Green athletics as well. In 1944 he became the publicity director of the Boston Yanks of the National Football League. He also served as the team's general manager.

== Head coaching record ==
=== College ===
Year	Team	Overall	Conference	Standing	Bowl/playoffs
1926	Tufts	4–4			
1927	Tufts	8–0			
1928	Tufts	5–2–1			
1929	Tufts	5–1–2			
Tufts:		22–7–1			
Total:		22–7–1			
