= 1944–45 Oklahoma A&M Aggies men's basketball team =

American college basketball season

1944–45 Oklahoma A&M Aggies men's basketball
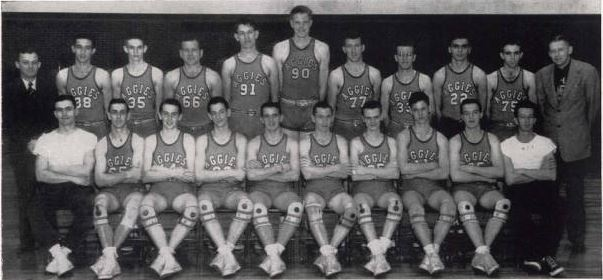

NCAA tournament National champions MVC regular season champions

National Championship Game, W 49–45 vs. NYU
- Conference: Missouri Valley Conference
- Record: 27–4 ( MVC)
- Head coach: Henry Iba
- Assistant coach: Bud Millikan

The 1944–45 Oklahoma A&M Aggies men's basketball team represented Oklahoma A&M College, now known as Oklahoma State University, (Note: When Oklahoma A&M changed its name to Oklahoma State in 1957, it also adopted a new athletic nickname. Men's teams are now "Cowboys" and women's teams are now "Cowgirls".) in NCAA competition in the 1944–45 season. The Aggies won their first NCAA championship, defeating the NYU Violets by a score of 49–45 in the championship game of the NCAA Tournament. Oklahoma A&M was also retroactively named the national champion by the Helms Athletic Foundation.

== NCAA tournament ==
- West Region
  - Oklahoma A&M 62, Utah 37
- Final Four
  - Oklahoma A&M 68, Arkansas 41
- Finals
  - Oklahoma A&M 49, NYU 45
