= 1945 NCAA basketball tournament =

- Teams: 8
- Finals site: Madison Square Garden, New York City, New York
- Champions: Oklahoma A&M Aggies (1st title, 1st title game, 1st Final Four)
- Runner-up: NYU Violets (1st title game, 1st Final Four)
- Semifinalists: Arkansas Razorbacks (2nd Final Four); Ohio State Buckeyes (3rd Final Four)
- Winning coach: Henry Iba (1st title)
- MOP: Bob Kurland (Oklahoma A&M)
- Attendance: 67,780
- Top scorer: Bob Kurland (Oklahoma A&M) (65 points)

The 1945 NCAA basketball tournament was an eight-team single-elimination tournament to determine the national champion of men's National Collegiate Athletic Association (NCAA) college basketball. The 7th annual edition of the tournament began on March 22, 1945, and ended with the championship game on March 27, at Madison Square Garden in New York City. A total of nine games were played, including a third place game in each region.

Oklahoma A&M, coached by Henry Iba, won the national title with a 49–45 victory in the final game over NYU, coached by Howard Cann. Bob Kurland of Oklahoma A&M was named the tournament's Most Outstanding Player.

== Locations ==
The following are the sites selected to host each round of the 1945 tournament:

=== Regionals ===
March 22 and 24
East Regional, Madison Square Garden, New York, New York (Host: Metropolitan New York Conference)
March 23 and 24
West Regional, Municipal Auditorium, Kansas City, Missouri (Host: Missouri Valley Conference)

=== Championship Game ===
March 27
Madison Square Garden, New York, New York (Host: Metropolitan New York Conference)

== Teams ==
Region	Team	Coach	Conference	Finished	Final Opponent	Score
East
East	Kentucky	Adolph Rupp	SEC	Regional third place	Tufts	W 66–56
East	NYU	Howard Cann	Middle Atlantic	Runner Up	Oklahoma A&M	L 49–45
East	Ohio State	Harold Olsen	Big Ten	National Semifinals	NYU	L 70–65
East	Tufts	Dick Cochran	New England	Regional Fourth Place	Kentucky	L 66–56
West
West	Arkansas	Eugene Lambert	Southwest	National Semifinals	Oklahoma A&M	L 68–41
West	Oklahoma A&M	Henry Iba	Missouri Valley	Champion	NYU	W 49–45
West	Oregon	John A. Warren	Pacific Coast	Regional third place	Utah	W 69–66
West	Utah	Vadal Peterson	Skyline	Regional Fourth Place	Oregon	L 69–66

== Bracket ==
* – Denotes overtime period

Quarterfinals
NYU	59
Tufts	44
Ohio State	45
Kentucky	37
Arkansas	79
Oregon	76
Oklahoma A&M	62
Utah	37

Semifinals
NYU	70
Ohio State	65
Arkansas	41
Oklahoma A&M	68

Finals
NYU	45
Oklahoma A&M	49

=== Regional third place ===
East Regional third place
Tufts	56
Kentucky	66

West Regional third place
Oregon	69
Utah	66

== See also ==
- 1945 National Invitation Tournament
- 1945 NAIA Basketball Tournament

== Notes ==
- This was the first appearance for Oklahoma A&M, who would win their first two NCAA tournaments. They would be the first team to win multiple tournaments, and the first team to repeat as champions. Of the nine other teams to win the championship in their first tournament appearance, only San Francisco was able to repeat as well.
- Three teams - NYU, Ohio State and Oklahoma A&M - would return for the 1946 tournament. Arkansas and Kentucky would both return within four years; Utah would not return to the tournament until 1955, and Oregon would not return until 1960.
- This was the only appearance of then-Tufts College, who are currently in Division III. Tufts is one of fourteen colleges and universities to have made the NCAA tournament and no longer be in Division I.
