= Bob Kurland =

American basketball player (1924–2013)

- Joseph DePietro (left) and Kurland on the way to the 1948 Summer Olympics

Personal information
- Born: December 23, 1924 St. Louis, Missouri, U.S.
- Died: September 29, 2013 (aged 88) Sanibel Island, Florida, U.S.
- Listed height: 7 ft 0 in (2.13 m)
- Listed weight: 220 lb (100 kg)

Career information
- High school: Jennings (Jennings, Missouri)
- College: Oklahoma State (1942–1946)
- Playing career: 1946–1952
- Position: Center
- Number: 90

Career history
- 1946–1952: Phillips 66ers

Career highlights
- 3× AAU champion (1947, 1948, 1950); 6× AAU All-American (1947–1952); 2× NCAA champion (1945, 1946); 2× NCAA Final Four Most Outstanding Player (1945, 1946); Helms National Player of the Year (1946); Sporting News Player of the Year (1946); 3× Consensus first-team All-American (1944–1946); First-team All-MVC (1946)
- Stats at Basketball Reference
- Basketball Hall of Fame
- Collegiate Basketball Hall of Fame

Robert Albert Kurland (December 23, 1924 – September 29, 2013) was an American basketball player, who played for the two-time NCAA champion Oklahoma A&M Aggies (now Oklahoma State Cowboys). Standing 7-foot (2.1 m) tall, he has been credited as the first person to dunk in a college basketball game. He led the U.S. basketball team to gold medals in two Summer Olympics, and led his AAU team to three national titles. He is a member of the Naismith Memorial Basketball Hall of Fame.

== Early life ==
Kurland was born in St. Louis, Missouri to Albert and Adele Kurland. He graduated from Jennings High School in Jennings, Missouri, where he participated in basketball and track.

== College career ==
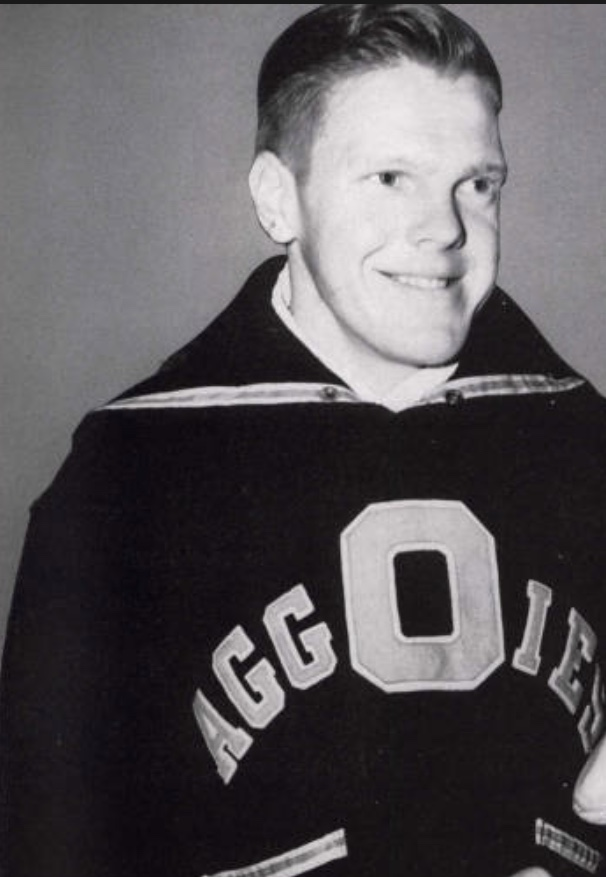
Kurland as a junior at Oklahoma A&M.

Kurland, a Missouri native, considered attending the University of Missouri. But when Oklahoma A&M played a game at Saint Louis University, A&M coach Henry Iba invited Kurland to dinner and offered him a scholarship. Missouri could only offer Kurland a job. Many of Kurland's family members had not finished high school, and Kurland was the first in his family to attend college at any level.

Kurland was an integral part of the team's consecutive NCAA titles in 1945 and 1946, and was named the NCAA basketball tournament Most Outstanding Player both times. In the 1945–46 season, he scored a then-season record 643 points, including 58 in a game against Saint Louis University, which featured 6 ft 8 in (2.03 m) freshman Ed Macauley. Kurland was voted Helms Foundation College Basketball Player of the Year.

Kurland was known to leap above the rim to grab opponents' shots. This led to the NCAA banning defensive goaltending in 1945. The rivalry between him and De Paul's George Mikan would foreshadow similar matchups, especially those of basketball's "big men."

In college, Kurland was active in many campus activities, including the student council, for which he served as president in 1945 and 1946. He graduated with a Bachelor of Science in education.

== AAU career ==
Kurland never played professional basketball, passing up the newly formed Basketball Association of America and the older National Basketball League (both of which would merge operations together in 1949 to form the present-day National Basketball Association), to play for Phillips Petroleum's A.A.U. team, the Phillips 66ers. Kurland played for six years with Phillips, winning three championships.

== Summer Olympics ==
Since Kurland never played professionally, he was eligible as an amateur for the Olympic Games. In the 1948 Summer Olympics in London, England, he led the U.S. basketball team to the gold medal. He was second on the team in scoring (behind Alex Groza) as the U.S. defeated France in the gold medal game, 65–21. In the 1952 Olympics in Helsinki, Finland, Kurland carried the U.S. flag in the opening ceremony. He was again a dominant force at center as the U.S. defeated the Soviet Union in the gold medal game, 36–25.

== Personal life ==
Kurland received post-graduate management training at Stanford University. He became a salesman for Phillips Petroleum Company, where he played AAU basketball, and later served as a senior marketing executive. He held a variety of positions, including ones responsible for the development of the self-service gas station concept, growth of the agricultural and plastics divisions, and management of marketing initiatives. His corporate responsibilities took his family to Denver, Wichita, Memphis, Cincinnati and Atlanta. Ultimately, the family returned to the home of Phillips Petroleum, Bartlesville, Oklahoma, where Kurland served as vice mayor and as a member of the city commission for several years. He retired from Phillips in 1985.

Kurland was elected to the Naismith Memorial Basketball Hall of Fame in 1961. In 1996, he was inducted into the National Polish-American Sports Hall of Fame.

After retirement, Kurland and his wife, Barbara, divided time between their homes in Bartlesville, Oklahoma and Sanibel Island, Florida.

Kurland died at his Florida home on September 29, 2013, at age 88. He was survived by his wife of 62 years, Barbara, their four children Alex, Ross, Dana, and Barbara, and seven grandchildren.

== See also ==
- List of Oklahoma State University Olympians
