= Henry Iba =

American basketball player and coach

Biographical details
- Born: August 6, 1904; Easton, Missouri, U.S.
- Died: January 15, 1993 (aged 88); Stillwater, Oklahoma, U.S.

Playing career

Basketball
- 1923–1927: Westminster (MO)
- Position: Center

Coaching career (HC unless noted)

Basketball
- 1927–1929: Classen HS (OK)
- 1929–1933: Northwest Missouri State
- 1933–1934: Colorado
- 1934–1970: Oklahoma A&M / State

Baseball
- 1934–1941: Oklahoma A&M / State

Administrative career (AD unless noted)
- 1935–1970: Oklahoma A&M / State

Head coaching record
- Overall: 751–340 (college basketball); 90–41 (college baseball)

Accomplishments and honors

Championships
- Basketball; 2 NCAA tournament (1945, 1946); 4 NCAA Regional—Final Four (1945, 1946, 1949, 1951)
- Basketball Hall of Fame; Inducted in 1969 (profile)
- College Basketball Hall of Fame; Inducted in 2006
Medal record
Head coach for United States
men's national basketball team
Olympic Games
Gold medal – first place	1964 Tokyo	Men's Basketball
Gold medal – first place	1968 Mexico City	Men's Basketball
Silver medal – second place	1972 Munich	Men's Basketball

Henry Payne “Hank” Iba (/ˈaɪbə/; August 6, 1904 – January 15, 1993) was an American basketball coach and college athletics administrator. He served as the head basketball coach at Northwest Missouri State Teacher's College, now known as Northwest Missouri State University, from 1929 to 1933; the University of Colorado Boulder from 1933 to 1934; and the Oklahoma State University–Stillwater, known as Oklahoma A&M prior to 1957, from 1934 to 1970, compiling a career college basketball coaching record of 751–340. He led Oklahoma A&M to consecutive NCAA basketball tournament titles, in 1945 and 1946.

Iba was also the athletic director at Oklahoma A&M / Oklahoma State from 1935 to 1970 and the school's head baseball coach from 1934 to 1941, tallying a mark of 90–41. As head coach of the United States men's national basketball team, he led the U.S. to the gold medals at the 1964 and 1968 Summer Olympics. Iba was inducted into the Naismith Memorial Basketball Hall of Fame in 1969.

== Early life ==
Iba was born and raised in Easton, Missouri. He played college basketball at Westminster College, where he became a member of Lambda Chi Alpha fraternity. The basketball court at Westminster is now named in his honor.

== Career ==
After coaching stints at Maryville Teachers' College (now Northwest Missouri State University) and the University of Colorado, Iba came to Oklahoma A&M College in 1934. He stayed at Oklahoma A&M, renamed Oklahoma State University in 1957, for 36 years until his retirement after the 1969–70 season. For most of his tenure at A&M/OSU, he doubled as athletic director. Additionally, Iba coached OSU's baseball team from 1934 to 1941.

Iba is thought to be one of the toughest coaches in NCAA history. He was a very methodical coach who expected things to be done perfectly. His teams were a reflection of his personality. They were methodical, ball-controlling units that featured weaving patterns and low scoring games. Iba's "swinging gate" defense (a man-to-man with team flow) was applauded by many, and is still effective in today's game. He was known as "the Iron Duke of Defense."

Iba's Aggies became the first to win consecutive NCAA titles (1945 and 1946). His 1945–46 NCAA champions were led by Bob Kurland, the game's first seven-foot player. They beat NYU in the 1945 finals and North Carolina in the 1946 finals. He was voted coach of the year in both seasons. His 1945 champions defeated National Invitation Tournament champion, DePaul, and 6'10" center George Mikan in a classic Red Cross Benefit game.

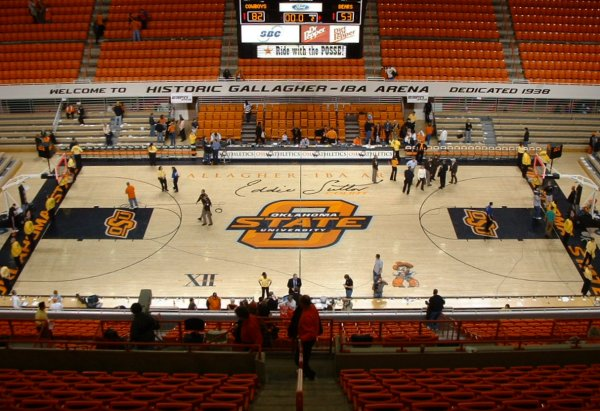
Inside Gallagher-Iba Arena January 22, 2005.

A&M/State teams won 14 Missouri Valley titles and one Big Eight title, and won 655 games in 36 seasons.

Iba's tenure crested in 1958. That year, the Cowboys joined (or rejoined, depending on the source) the Big Eight and promptly won the conference title, advancing all the way to the Elite Eight. However, after that season, his Cowboys only finished higher than fourth two more times in Big Eight play, one of which was another Elite Eight appearance in 1965.

All told, in 40 years of coaching, he won 767 games—the second-most in college basketball history at the time of his retirement. As OSU's athletic director, he built a program that won 19 national championships in 5 sports (basketball, wrestling, baseball, golf, cross-country) over the years. After his retirement, "Mr. Iba" (as he is still called at OSU) frequently showed up at practices, often giving advice to young players.

In 1987, OSU's home arena, Gallagher Hall, was renamed Gallagher-Iba Arena in Iba's honor. A seat in the southeast concourse level of the arena is known as "Mr. Iba's Seat," and it is maintained without a fan having sat in it.

=== Olympic coaching ===
Iba coached the United States Olympic basketball team in 1964, 1968 and 1972. He is the first coach in U.S. Olympic basketball history to coach two gold medal-winning teams (1964 in 1964 Tokyo Summer Olympics and 1968 in 1968 Mexico City Summer Olympics). Coach Mike Krzyzewski became the second in 2012. At his third Olympics in charge in 1972, Iba led his team to another gold medal game, which resulted in a highly controversial 50–51 loss to the Soviet Union, breaking Team USA's 63-game winning streak in Olympic competition.

=== Honors and awards ===
Iba was elected to the Oklahoma Sports Hall of Fame, the Oklahoma Hall of Fame, the Missouri Hall of Fame, the Helms Foundation All-Time Hall of Fame for basketball, The Westminster College (MO) Sports Hall of Fame, National Collegiate Basketball Hall of Fame (in 2006), FIBA Hall of Fame (in 2007) and Naismith Memorial Basketball Hall of Fame (in 1969) at Springfield, Massachusetts.

Iba was indirectly responsible for a $165 million donation to the Oklahoma State University athletic program. In 1951, T. Boone Pickens, a graduate of OSU with a degree in petroleum geology, was looking for a job and asked Iba for help. Iba set the young graduate up with two interviews for high-school basketball coaching jobs and although Pickens didn't end up becoming a coach, the favor Iba did for him was the impetus behind his decision 50 years later to make a $165 million donation to Oklahoma State University's athletic program.

Iba was inducted into the Oklahoma Hall of Fame in 1965.

== Death ==
Iba died on January 15, 1993, in Stillwater, Oklahoma.

== Legacy ==
=== Coaching tree ===
Iba is known for his coaching tree, the group of prominent coaches who either coached or played for Iba himself, or are linked to Iba by playing for one of his pupils. Coaches in this tree typically use a physical man-to-man defense and an offense predicated on ball movement and passing.

Coach	Iba connection	Years as Head Coach	Notes
Larry Brown	Played for the 1964 U.S. Olympic team	Numerous college and pro teams, 1972–present	1988 NCAA title; 2004 NBA title; coached the 2004 U.S. Olympic team.
Doug Collins	Played for the 1972 U.S. Olympic team	Chicago Bulls, Detroit Pistons, Washington Wizards, Philadelphia 76ers, 1986–2013	
Jack Hartman	Played for Oklahoma A&M, 1943–47; assistant coach at Oklahoma A&M, 1954	Southern Illinois, Kansas State, 1962–86	NABC National Coach of the Year, 1981
Don Haskins	Played for Oklahoma A&M, 1949–52; assistant coach on the 1972 U.S. Olympic Team	Texas Western/UTEP, 1961–1999	1966 NCAA title
Moe Iba	Played for Oklahoma State, 1958–62; assistant to Don Haskins at UTEP, 1962–66	Memphis State, Nebraska, Texas Christian, 1966–94	Son of Henry Iba
Bob Knight	Assistant coach on 1972 the U.S. Olympic Team	Army, Indiana, Texas Tech, 1965–2008	1976, '81, and '87 NCAA titles. Coached 1984 the U.S. Olympic team.
Bud Millikan	Played for Oklahoma A&M, 1939–42	Maryland, 1950–67	
Doyle Parrack	Played for Oklahoma A&M, 1943–46	Oklahoma City, Oklahoma, 1950–62	
Wilbur "Sparky" Stalcup	Played for Iba at Northwest Missouri, 1929–33	Northwest Missouri, Missouri, 1933–62	
Eddie Sutton	Played for Oklahoma A&M, 1955–58; assistant coach at Oklahoma State, 1958–59	Creighton, Arkansas, Kentucky, Oklahoma State, San Francisco, 1969–2008	1978 and 1986 AP National Coach of the Year

=== Henry Iba Award ===
The Henry Iba Award was established in 1959 to recognize the best college basketball coach of the year by the United States Basketball Writers Association. Five nominees are presented and the individual with the most votes receives the award which is presented in conjunction with the Final Four. The award is presented at the Oscar Robertson Trophy breakfast the Friday before the Final Four.

=== Henry P. Iba Citizen Athlete of the Year ===
In 1994, the Rotary Club of Tulsa established the Henry P. Iba Citizen Athlete of the Year Award to honor two athletes, one male and one female, which have exhibited or demonstrated excellence in their sport and in life. In 1997, the Rotary Club of Tulsa established the Henry P. Iba Citizen Athlete of the Year Award with additional acknowledgement by recognized by the Chairman's Award. Former New York Knicks player John Starks was the male winner of the award in 1997.

=== Portrayals ===
In 2017, John Savage portrayed Iba in the Russian sport drama Going Vertical, about the 1972 Olympic final.

== Head coaching record ==
=== College basketball ===
Record table
Season	Team	Overall	Conference	Standing	Postseason
Northwest Missouri State Bearcats (Missouri Intercollegiate Athletic Association) (1930–1933)
1929–30	Northwest Missouri State	31–0			
1930–31	Northwest Missouri State	31–6			
1931–32	Northwest Missouri State	20–2			NAAU Runner-up
1932–33	Northwest Missouri State	12–7			
Northwest Missouri State:		93–15 (.861)			
Colorado Silver and Gold (Rocky Mountain Faculty Athletic Conference) (1933–1934)
1933–34	Colorado	9–8	7–7		
Colorado:		9–8 (.529)			
Oklahoma A&M/State Cowboys (Missouri Valley Conference) (1934–1957)
1934–35	Oklahoma A&M	9–9	5–7	5th	
1935–36	Oklahoma A&M	16–8	9–4	T–1st	
1936–37	Oklahoma A&M	19–3	11–1	1st	
1937–38	Oklahoma A&M	25–3	13–1	1st	
1938–39	Oklahoma A&M	19–8	11–3	1st	
1939–40	Oklahoma A&M	26–3	12–0	1st	NIT Final Four
1940–41	Oklahoma A&M	18–7	8–4	2nd	
1941–42	Oklahoma A&M	20–6	9–1	T–1st	
1942–43	Oklahoma A&M	14–10	7–3	T–2nd	
1943–44	Oklahoma A&M	27–6		1st*	NIT Final Four
1944–45	Oklahoma A&M	27–4		1st*	NCAA Champion
1945–46	Oklahoma A&M	31–2	12–0	1st	NCAA Champion
1946–47	Oklahoma A&M	24–8	8–4	T–2nd	
1947–48	Oklahoma A&M	27–4	10–0	T–1st	
1948–49	Oklahoma A&M	23–5	9–1	1st	NCAA Runner-up
1949–50	Oklahoma A&M	18–9	7–5	3rd	
1950–51	Oklahoma A&M	29–6	12–2	1st	NCAA Fourth Place
1951–52	Oklahoma A&M	19–8	9–3	2nd	
1952–53	Oklahoma A&M	23–7	8–2	1st	NCAA Elite Eight
1953–54	Oklahoma A&M	24–5	9–1	1st	NCAA Elite Eight
1954–55	Oklahoma A&M	12–13	5–5	3rd	
1955–56	Oklahoma A&M	18–9	8–4	2nd	NIT First Round
1956–57	Oklahoma A&M	17–9	8–6	3rd	
Oklahoma State Cowboys (Big Eight Conference) (1957–1970)
1957–58	Oklahoma State	21–8			NCAA University Division Elite Eight
1958–59	Oklahoma State	11–14	5–9	5th	
1959–60	Oklahoma State	10–15	4–10	7th	
1960–61	Oklahoma State	14–11	8–6	3rd	
1961–62	Oklahoma State	14–11	7–7	4th	
1962–63	Oklahoma State	16–9	7–7	5th	
1963–64	Oklahoma State	15–10	7–7	4th	
1964–65	Oklahoma State	20–7	12–2	1st	NCAA University Division Elite Eight
1965–66	Oklahoma State	4–21	2–12	7th	
1966–67	Oklahoma State	7–18	2–12	7th	
1967–68	Oklahoma State	10–16	3–11	7th	
1968–69	Oklahoma State	12–13	5–9	6th	
1969–70	Oklahoma State	14–12	5–9	7th	
Oklahoma State:		653–317 (.673)	257–152 (.628)		
Total:		755–340 (.689)			
National champion Postseason invitational champion Conference regular season champion Conference regular season and conference tournament champion Division regular season champion Division regular season and conference tournament champion Conference tournament champion

=== College baseball ===
Record table
Season	Team	Overall	Conference	Standing	Postseason
Oklahoma A&M Cowboys (Missouri Valley Conference) (1934–1941)
1934	Oklahoma A&M	11–4			
1935	Oklahoma A&M	8–8			
1936	Oklahoma A&M	13–7			
1937	Oklahoma A&M	13–4			
1938	Oklahoma A&M	13–4			
1939	Oklahoma A&M	11–7			
1940	Oklahoma A&M	13–5			
1941	Oklahoma A&M	8–2			
Oklahoma A&M:		90–41 (.687)			
Total:		90–41 (.687)			
National champion Postseason invitational champion Conference regular season champion Conference regular season and conference tournament champion Division regular season champion Division regular season and conference tournament champion Conference tournament champion

== See also ==
- List of college men's basketball coaches with 600 wins
- List of NCAA Division I Men's Final Four appearances by coach
- List of Oklahoma State University Olympians
