= NCAA Division I men's basketball tournament bids by school =

This is a list of NCAA Division I men's basketball tournament bids by school, and is updated through 2026. As of the next NCAA tournament in 2027, there are 76 bids possible each year (32 automatic qualifiers, 44 at-large). Schools not currently in Division I are in italics (e.g., CCNY) and some have appeared under prior names (e.g., UTEP went by Texas Western in 1966). Vacated appearances are excluded from the Bids table and noted below it.

== Bids ==
The NCAA recognizes Sweet Sixteen and Elite Eight since the beginning of the tournament, despite the fact that there were no games to advance to the final eight teams before 1951 and not all teams had to play a game to advance to the final sixteen teams before 1975. Between 1939 and 1950, there were only 8 teams in the tournament, so all teams can claim an Elite Eight appearance. Between 1951 and 1952, there were sixteen teams in the tournament, so all could claim a Sweet Sixteen appearance. Between 1953 and 1974, participating teams fluctuated from 22 to 25 teams and some received byes to the Sweet Sixteen. Between 1975 and 1984, all teams were required to play at least one game before the Sweet Sixteen, and since 1985 all teams are required to play at least two games.

Bids by school		First bid	Most recent		Sweet 16		Elite 8		Final 4		Finals		Champions	
#	School	First bid	Bid	Win	Last	#	Last	#	Last	#	Last	#	Last	#
63	Kentucky	1942	2026	2026	2025	45	2019	38	2015	17	2014	12	2012	8
55	North Carolina	1941	2026	2025	2024	36	2022	29	2022	21	2022	12	2017	6
53	Kansas (Note: Kansas vacated the results of its 2018 NCAA tournament appearances as well as its finals appearance in 2018.)	1940	2026	2026	2022	31	2022	24	2022	15	2022	10	2022	4
52	UCLA (Note: UCLA vacated the results of its 1980 and 1999 NCAA tournament appearances as well as its finals appearance in 1980.)	1950	2026	2026	2023	36	2021	22	2021	19	2006	12	1995	11
48	Duke	1955	2026	2026	2026	35	2026	26	2025	18	2015	11	2015	5
41	Indiana	1940	2023	2023	2016	22	2002	11	2002	8	2002	6	1987	5
41	Louisville (Note: Louisville forfeited 123 wins during 2011–2014, its NCAA tournament appearances, and its 2013 National Championship title.)	1951	2026	2026	2013	24	2013	11	2013	8	2013	3	2013	3
41	Syracuse	1957	2021	2021	2021	24	2016	10	2016	6	2003	3	2003	1
41	Villanova (Note: Villanova vacated the results of its 1971 NCAA tournament appearance along with its championship game appearance that year.)	1939	2026	2022	2022	19	2022	14	2022	6	2018	3	2018	3
40	Texas	1939	2026	2026	2026	12	2023	8	2003	3				
39	Michigan State	1957	2026	2026	2026	23	2025	15	2019	10	2009	3	2000	2
38	UConn (Note: UConn vacated the results of the 1996 NCAA tournament appearance and its Sweet Sixteen appearance that season.)	1951	2026	2026	2026	20	2026	14	2026	8	2026	7	2024	6
37	Arkansas	1941	2026	2026	2026	16	2022	12	1995	6	1995	2	1994	1
37	Marquette (Note: Marquette turned down an invitation to the NCAA tournament in 1970 that would make 38 appearances.)	1955	2025	2024	2024	17	2013	7	2003	3	1977	2	1977	1
37	Notre Dame	1953	2022	2022	2016	17	2016	7	1978	1				
36	Arizona (Note: Arizona vacated the results of its 1999, 2008, 2017, and 2018 NCAA tournament appearances, of which it reached the Sweet 16 in 2017.)	1951	2026	2026	2026	22	2026	12	2026	5	2001	2	1997	1
36	Illinois	1942	2026	2026	2026	13	2026	11	2026	6	2005	1		
36	Purdue (Note: Purdue vacated the results of the 1996 NCAA tournament which it reached the round of 32.)	1969	2026	2026	2026	16	2026	7	2024	3	2024	2		
34	Oklahoma	1939	2025	2021	2016	10	2016	9	2016	5	1988	2		
33	BYU	1950	2026	2025	2025	6	1981	3						
33	Cincinnati	1958	2019	2018	2012	13	1996	8	1992	6	1963	3	1962	2
33	Temple	1944	2019	2013	2001	7	2001	8	1958	2				
32	Kansas State	1948	2023	2023	2023	18	2023	14	1964	4	1951	1		
32	Ohio State (Note: Ohio State vacated the results of its 1999, 2000, 2001, and 2002 NCAA tournament appearances, in which it reached the Final Four in 1999 and the round of 32 in 2000 and 2002.)	1939	2026	2022	2013	14	2013	14	2012	10	2007	5	1960	1
31	Georgetown	1943	2021	2015	2007	11	2007	9	2007	5	1985	4	1984	1
31	St. John's (Note: St. John's vacated the results of its 2002 NCAA tournament appearance.)	1951	2026	2026	2026	10	1999	6	1985	2	1952	1		
31	West Virginia	1955	2023	2021	2018	11	2010	3	2010	2	1959	1		
30	Iowa	1955	2026	2026	2026	9	2026	5	1980	3	1956	1		
30	Maryland (Note: Maryland vacated the results of its 1988 NCAA tournament appearance in which it reached the round of 32.)	1958	2025	2025	2025	15	2002	4	2002	2	2002	1	2002	1
30	Michigan (Note: Michigan vacated the results of 113 games won while four players were not eligible, including the 1992 and 1993 Final Fours, and NCAA tournament appearances in 1993, 1996 and 1998.)	1948	2026	2026	2026	19	2026	15	2026	7	2026	6	2026	2
30	Missouri (Note: Missouri vacated the results of its 1994 NCAA tournament appearance in which it reached the Elite Eight.)	1944	2026	2023	2009	6	2009	4						
30	Xavier	1961	2025	2025	2023	9	2017	3						
29	Oklahoma State	1945	2021	2021	2005	11	2004	11	2004	6	1949	3	1946	2
29	Utah	1944	2016	2016	2015	16	1998	6	1998	4	1998	2	1944	1
29	Wisconsin	1941	2026	2025	2017	10	2015	6	2015	4	2015	2	1941	1
28 (Note: Received an automatic bid in 2020 for winning the 2020 West Coast Conference men's basketball tournament but is not reflected in the totals when the NCAA canceled the 2020 NCAA Division I men's basketball tournament due to the COVID-19 pandemic.)	Gonzaga	1995	2026	2026	2024	14	2023	6	2021	2	2021	2		
28	NC State (Note: NC State vacated the results of the 1987 and 1988 NCAA tournament appearances.)	1950	2026	2024	2024	12	2024	7	2024	4	1983	2	1983	2
28	Tennessee	1967	2026	2026	2026	12	2026	4						
27	Houston	1956	2026	2026	2026	17	2025	8	2025	7	2025	3		
27	Pittsburgh	1941	2023	2023	2009	7	2009	3	1941	1				
27	Virginia	1976	2026	2026	2019	10	2019	7	2019	3	2019	1	2019	1
26	Alabama (Note: Alabama vacated the results of the 1987 tournament.)	1975	2026	2026	2026	12	2025	3	2024	1				
26	Creighton	1941	2025	2025	2024	6	2023	2						
26	Princeton	1952	2023	2023	2023	7	1965	1	1965	1				
26 (Note: Received an automatic bid in 2020 for winning the 2020 Mountain West Conference men's basketball tournament but is not reflected in the totals when the NCAA canceled the 2020 NCAA Division I men's basketball tournament due to the COVID-19 pandemic.)	Utah State	1939	2026	2026	1970	3	1970	2						
25	Pennsylvania	1953	2026	1994	1979	5	1979	3	1979	1				
25	Iowa State	1944	2026	2026	2026	8	2000	2	1944	1				
24	Florida (Note: Florida vacated the results of the 1987 and 1988 NCAA tournaments.)	1989	2026	2026	2025	11	2025	10	2025	6	2025	4	2025	3
24	LSU	1953	2022	2021	2019	10	2006	6	2006	4				
23	Memphis (Note: Memphis vacated tournament appearances for 1982, 1983, 1984, 1985, 1986 and 2008 for NCAA violations. This included Final Fours in 1985 and 2008 and the 2008 Finals appearance.)	1955	2025	2022	2009	6	2007	4	1973	1	1973	1		
23 (Note: Was awarded the automatic bid when the 2020 WAC men's basketball tournament was canceled due to the COVID-19 pandemic, prior to the NCAA canceling the 2020 NCAA Division I men's basketball tournament. It is not reflected in the totals.)	New Mexico State (Note: New Mexico State vacated the results of the 1992, 1993 and 1994 NCAA tournaments which it reached the Sweet Sixteen (1992) and round of 32 (1993).)	1952	2022	2022	1992	4	1970	1	1970	1				
23	Wake Forest	1939	2017	2010	2004	9	1996	6	1962	1				
23	Western Kentucky (Note: Western Kentucky vacated the results of the 1971 tournament, in which it reached the Final Four.)	1940	2024	2012	2008	6	1940	1						
22	Providence	1964	2023	2022	2022	6	1997	4	1987	2				
22	Texas Tech (Note: Texas Tech vacated the results of the 1996 NCAA tournament.)	1954	2026	2026	2025	7	2025	3	2019	1	2019	1		
21	VCU	1980	2026	2026	2011	1	2011	1	2011	1				
20	Saint Joseph's (Note: Saint Joseph's vacated the results of its 1961 NCAA tournament which it reached the Final Four.)	1959	2016	2016	2004	6	2004	2						
20	UNLV	1975	2013	2008	2007	10	1991	5	1991	4	1990	1	1990	1
20	USC (Note: USC vacated the results of the 2008 tournament.)	1940	2023	2021	2021	5	2021	4	1954	2				
19	Dayton	1952	2024	2024	2014	7	2014	3	1967	1	1967	1		
19	Oregon	1939	2025	2025	2021	8	2017	7	2017	2	1939	1	1939	1
18	Boston College	1958	2009	2007	2006	9	1994	3						
18	California (Note: California vacated the results of its 1996 NCAA tournament appearance.)	1946	2016	2013	1997	4	1960	3	1960	3	1960	2	1959	1
18	DePaul (Note: DePaul vacated the results of NCAA tournament appearances in 1986, 1987, 1988, and 1989. It reached the Sweet Sixteen during the first two tournaments and the round of 32 for the last two tournaments.)	1943	2004	2004	1984	8	1979	3	1979	2				
18 (Note: Was awarded the automatic bid when the 2020 ACC men's basketball tournament was canceled due to the COVID-19 pandemic, prior to the NCAA canceling the 2020 NCAA Division I men's basketball tournament. It is not reflected in the totals.)	Florida State	1968	2021	2021	2021	7	2018	3	1972	1	1972	1		
18	Miami (OH)	1953	2026	2026	1999	4								
18	Murray State	1964	2022	2022										
18	Texas A&M	1951	2026	2026	2018	5								
17	Arizona State	1958	2023	2023	1995	5	1975	3						
17	Baylor	1946	2025	2025	2021	5	2021	5	2021	3	2021	2	2021	1
17	Georgia Tech	1960	2021	2010	2004	7	2004	4	2004	2	2004	1		
17	New Mexico	1968	2025	2025	1974	2								
17	San Diego State	1975	2025	2024	2024	4	2023	1	2023	1	2023	1		
17	San Francisco	1955	2022	1979	1979	12	1974	7	1957	3	1956	2	1956	2
17	Stanford	1942	2014	2014	2014	5	2001	3	1998	2	1942	1	1942	1
17	UAB	1981	2024	2015	2004	3	1982	1						
17	UTEP	1963	2010	1992	1992	4	1966	1	1966	1	1966	1	1966	1
17	Vanderbilt	1965	2026	2026	2007	6	1965	1						
17	Washington	1943	2019	2019	2010	7	1953	3	1953	1				
16	Butler	1962	2018	2018	2017	6	2011	2	2011	2	2011	2		
16	Colorado	1940	2024	2024	1969	5	1963	6	1955	2				
15	Iona (Note: Iona vacated the results of the 1980 NCAA tournament, in which it reached the second round.)	1979	2023											
16	Tulsa	1955	2016	2003	2000	4	2000	1						
16	Weber State	1968	2016	1999	1972	2								
16	Wichita State	1964	2021	2017	2015	6	2013	4	2013	2				
16	Wyoming	1941	2022	2002	1987	4	1952	5	1943	1	1943	1	1943	1
15	Clemson (Note: Clemson vacated the results of the 1990 NCAA tournament.)	1980	2026	2024	2024	4	2024	2						
15	Davidson	1966	2022	2008	2008	4	2008	3						
15	Oregon State (Note: Oregon State vacated the results of the 1980, 1981 and 1982 NCAA tournaments.)	1947	2021	2021	2021	6	2021	7	1963	2				
15	Saint Mary's	1959	2026	2025	2010	2	1959	1						
14	Auburn	1984	2025	2025	2025	6	2025	3	2025	2				
14	Mississippi State	1963	2025	2008	1996	3	1996	1	1996	1				
14	Ohio	1960	2021	2021	2012	3	1964	1						
14	Seton Hall	1988	2022	2018	2000	4	1991	2	1989	1	1989	1		
13	Colorado State	1954	2025	2025	1969	2	1969	1						
13	Holy Cross	1947	2016	2016	1953	1	1953	4	1948	2	1947	1	1947	1
13	Miami (FL)	1960	2026	2026	2023	5	2023	2	2023	1				
13	Montana	1975	2025	2006	1975	1								
13	Pepperdine	1944	2002	2000	1976	2	1944	1						
13	SMU	1955	2026	1988	1967	6	1967	2	1956	1				
13	Virginia Tech	1967	2022	2019	2019	2	1967	1						
12	Chattanooga	1981	2022	1997	1997	1								
12	Georgia (Note: Georgia vacated the results of the 1985 and 2002 NCAA tournaments.)	1983	2026	2002	1996	2	1983	1	1983	1				
12	La Salle	1954	2013	2013	2013	3	1955	2	1955	2	1955	2	1954	1
12	Old Dominion	1980	2019	2010										
12	Santa Clara	1952	2026	1996	1970	7	1969	5	1952	1				
12	TCU	1952	2026	2026	1968	4	1968	1						
11	Charlotte	1977	2005	2001	1977	1	1977	1	1977	1				
11	George Washington	1954	2014	2006	1993	1								
11	Idaho State	1953	1987	1977	1977	5	1977	1						
11	Navy	1947	1998	1986	1986	3	1986	2						
11	Nevada	1984	2024	2018	2018	2								
11	Oklahoma City	1952	1973	1973	1965	5	1957	3						
11	Saint Louis	1952	2026	2026	1957	2	1952	1						
11	Seattle	1953	1969	1964	1964	5	1958	1	1958	1	1958	1		
11	Texas Southern	1990	2023	2022										
11 (Note: Received an automatic bid in 2020 for winning the 2020 Big South Conference men's basketball tournament but is not reflected in the totals when the NCAA canceled the 2020 NCAA Division I men's basketball tournament due to the COVID-19 pandemic.)	Winthrop	1999	2021	2007										
10	Boise State	1976	2024											
10 (Note: Received an automatic bid in 2020 for winning the 2020 Southern Conference men's basketball tournament but is not reflected in the totals when the NCAA canceled the 2020 NCAA Division I men's basketball tournament due to the COVID-19 pandemic.)	East Tennessee State	1968	2017	1992	1968	1								
10	Minnesota (Note: Minnesota vacated the results of the 1972, 1994, 1995, and 1997 NCAA tournaments.)	1982	2019	2019	1990	3	1990	1						
10	North Carolina A&T	1982	2013	2013										
10	Ole Miss	1981	2025	2025	2025	2								
10	Penn State	1942	2023	2023	2001	4	1954	2	1954	1				
10	Rhode Island	1961	2018	2018	1998	2	1998	1						
10	Richmond	1984	2022	2022	2011	2								
10	South Carolina	1971	2024	2017	2017	4	2017	1	2017	1				
10	Southern Illinois	1977	2007	2007	2007	3								
10 (Note: Was awarded the automatic bid when the 2020 America East men's basketball tournament was canceled due to the COVID-19 pandemic, prior to the NCAA canceling the 2020 NCAA Division I men's basketball tournament. It is not reflected in the totals.)	Vermont	2003	2024	2012										
9 (Note: Received an automatic bid in 2020 for winning the 2020 Missouri Valley Conference men's basketball tournament but is not reflected in the totals when the NCAA canceled the 2020 NCAA Division I men's basketball tournament due to the COVID-19 pandemic.)	Bradley	1950	2019	2006	2006	3	1955	3	1954	2	1954	2		
9	Middle Tennessee	1975	2017	2017										
9	Morehead State	1956	2024	2011	1961	2								
9	Nebraska	1986	2026	2026	2026	1								
9	Northeastern	1981	2019	1984										
9	Northern Iowa	1990	2026	2016	2010	1								
9	Pacific	1966	2013	2005	1971	3	1967	1						
9 (Note: Received an automatic bid in 2020 for winning the 2020 Northeast Conference men's basketball tournament but is not reflected in the totals when the NCAA canceled the 2020 NCAA Division I men's basketball tournament due to the COVID-19 pandemic.)	Robert Morris	1982	2025	2015										
9	Southern	1981	2016	1993										
9	Valparaiso	1996	2015	1998	1998	1								
8 (Note: Was awarded the automatic bid when the 2020 MAC men's basketball tournament was canceled due to the COVID-19 pandemic, prior to the NCAA canceling the 2020 NCAA Division I men's basketball tournament. It is not reflected in the totals.)	Akron	1986	2026											
8 (Note: Received an automatic bid in 2020 for winning the 2020 Ohio Valley Conference men's basketball tournament but is not reflected in the totals when the NCAA canceled the 2020 NCAA Division I men's basketball tournament due to the COVID-19 pandemic.)	Belmont	2006	2019	2019										
8	Bucknell	1987	2018	2006										
8	Drake	1969	2025	2025	1971	3	1971	3	1969	1				
8	Eastern Kentucky	1953	2014											
8	Furman	1971	2026	2023	1974	1								
8	LIU (Note: After the 2018–19 school year, Long Island University merged its two existing athletic programs—the Division I program of its Brooklyn campus (historically known as "Long Island" and "LIU Brooklyn") and the Division II program of its Post campus—into a single Division I athletic program that now competes as the LIU Sharks. Because the unified athletic program inherited the Division I membership of the Brooklyn campus, it is credited with all of Brooklyn's NCAA tournament appearances.)	1981	2026											
8	Loyola Chicago	1963	2022	2021	2021	5	2018	2	2018	2	1963	1	1963	1
8	Manhattan	1956	2015	2004	1958	1								
8	Rutgers	1975	2022	2021	1979	2	1976	1	1976	1				
8	St. Bonaventure	1961	2021	2018	1970	3	1970	1	1970	1				
8	South Alabama	1979	2008	1989										
8	UMass (Note: UMass vacated the results of the 1996 NCAA tournament, in which it advanced to the Final Four.)	1962	2014	1995	1995	2	1995	1						
8 (Note: Was awarded the automatic bid when the 2020 Ivy League men's basketball tournament was canceled due to the COVID-19 pandemic, prior to the NCAA canceling the 2020 NCAA Division I men's basketball tournament. It is not reflected in the totals.)	Yale	1949	2025	2024			1949	1						
7	Ball State	1981	2000	1990	1990	1								
7 (Note: Received an automatic bid in 2020 for winning the 2020 Patriot League men's basketball tournament but is not reflected in the totals when the NCAA canceled the 2020 NCAA Division I men's basketball tournament due to the COVID-19 pandemic.)	Boston University	1959	2011	1959	1959	1	1959	1						
7	Charleston	1994	2024	1997										
7	Colgate	1995	2024											
7	Dartmouth	1941	1959	1958	1958	2	1958	5	1944	2	1944	2		
7	Fairleigh Dickinson	1985	2023	2023										
7	Kent State	1999	2023	2002	2002	1	2002	1						
7	Long Beach State (Note: Long Beach State vacated the results of the 1971, 1972 and 1973 NCAA tournaments.)	1970	2024	1970	1970	1								
7	Louisiana (Note: Louisiana vacated the results of NCAA tournament appearances in 1972, 1973, 2004, and 2005.)	1982	2023	1992										
7	Louisiana-Monroe	1982	1996											
7	Mount St. Mary's	1995	2025	2025										
7	Oral Roberts	1974	2023	2021	2021	2	1974	1						
7 (Note: Was awarded the automatic bid when the 2020 MAAC men's basketball tournament was canceled due to the COVID-19 pandemic, prior to the NCAA canceling the 2020 NCAA Division I men's basketball tournament. It is not reflected in the totals.)	Siena	1989	2026	2009										
7	South Dakota State	2012	2024											
7	UC Santa Barbara	1988	2023	1990										
7	UNC Wilmington	2000	2025	2002										
7	Washington State	1941	2024	2024	2008	1	1941	1	1941	1	1941	1		
6	Alcorn State	1980	2002	1984										
6	Austin Peay (Note: Austin Peay vacated the results of the 1973 tournament.)	1974	2016	1987										
6	Delaware	1992	2022											
6	Detroit Mercy	1962	2012	1999	1977	1								
6	Duquesne	1940	2024	2024	1969	2	1952	2	1940	1				
6	George Mason	1989	2011	2011	2006	1	2006	1	2006	1				
6	Georgia State	1991	2022	2015										
6	Hampton	2001	2016	2015										
6	Hawaii	1972	2026	2016										
6	Illinois State	1983	1998	1998										
6	James Madison	1981	2024	2024										
6	Lamar	1979	2012	1983	1980	1								
6	Lehigh	1985	2026	2012										
6 (Note: Received an automatic bid in 2020 for winning the 2020 ASUN men's basketball tournament but is not reflected in the totals when the NCAA canceled the 2020 NCAA Division I men's basketball tournament due to the COVID-19 pandemic.)	Liberty	1994	2025	2019										
6	Missouri State	1987	1999	1999	1999	1								
6	Montana State	1951	2024		1951	1								
6	NYU	1943	1963	1963	1963	3	1960	4	1960	2	1945	1		
6	UCF	1994	2026	2019										
6	Wofford	2010	2025	2019										
5	Alabama State	2001	2025	2025										
5	Albany	2006	2015	2014										
5	Cornell	1954	2010	2010	2010	2								
5	Drexel	1986	2021	1996										
5	Evansville	1982	1999	1989										
5	Fresno State (Note: Fresno State vacated the results of the 2000 tournament.)	1981	2016	2001	1982	1								
5	Green Bay	1991	2016	1994										
5	Harvard	1946	2015	2014			1946	1						
5 (Note: Received an automatic bid in 2020 for winning the 2020 CAA men's basketball tournament but is not reflected in the totals when the NCAA canceled the 2020 NCAA Division I men's basketball tournament due to the COVID-19 pandemic.)	Hofstra	1976	2026											
5	Howard	1981	2026	2026										
5	Idaho	1981	2026	1982	1982	1								
5	Jacksonville	1970	1986	1970	1970	1	1970	1	1970	1	1970	1		
5	Little Rock	1986	2016	2016										
5	Louisiana Tech	1984	1991	1989	1985	1								
5	Marshall (Note: Marshall vacated the results of the 1987 tournament.)	1956	2018	2018										
5	McNeese	1989	2026	2025										
5	Mississippi Valley State	1986	2012											
5	LSU New Orleans	1987	2017	1987										
5 (Note: Received an automatic bid in 2020 for winning the 2020 Summit League men's basketball tournament but is not reflected in the totals when the NCAA canceled the 2020 NCAA Division I men's basketball tournament due to the COVID-19 pandemic.)	North Dakota State	2009	2026	2019										
5	Saint Peter's	1991	2024	2022	2022	1	2022	1						
5	South Carolina State	1989	2003											
5	UNC Asheville	2003	2023	2011										
5	Wright State	1993	2026	2022										
4	Air Force	1960	2006											
4	American	2008	2025											
4	Bowling Green	1959	1968	1963	1963	1								
4	Buffalo	2015	2019	2019										
4	Cal State Fullerton	1978	2022	1978	1978	1	1978	1						
4	Canisius	1955	1996	1957	1957	3	1956	2						
4	Central Michigan	1975	2003	2003	1975	1								
4	Coastal Carolina	1991	2015											
4	Coppin State	1990	2008	1997										
4	Eastern Michigan	1988	1998	1996	1991	1								
4	Fordham	1953	1992	1971	1971	1								
4	Grand Canyon	2021	2025	2024										
4	Indiana State	1979	2011	2001	1979	1	1979	1	1979	1	1979	1		
4	Lafayette	1957	2015	1957	1957	1								
4	Loyola Marymount (Note: Loyola Marymount vacated the results of the 1980 tournament.)	1961	1990	1990	1990	2	1990	1						
4	Milwaukee	2003	2014	2006	2005	1								
4	Monmouth	1996	2006	2006										
4	Norfolk State	2012	2025	2021										
4	North Carolina Central	2014	2019											
4	North Texas	1988	2021	2021										
4	Oakland	2005	2024	2024										
4	Rice	1940	1970	1954	1954	1	1942	2						
4	San Diego	1984	2008	2008										
4	South Florida	1990	2026	2012										
4	Toledo	1954	1980	1979	1979	1								
4	Troy	2003	2026											
4	UNC Greensboro	1996	2021											
4	UTSA	1988	2011	2011										
4	Western Michigan	1976	2014	1998	1976	1								
3	Appalachian State	1979	2021											
3	Central Connecticut	2000	2007											
3	Cleveland State	1986	2021	2009	1986	1								
3	Columbia	1948	1968	1968	1968	2	1948	1						
3	Eastern Washington	2004	2021											
3	Fairfield	1986	1997											
3	Florida Atlantic	2002	2024	2023	2023	1	2023	1	2023	1				
3	Florida A&M	1999	2007	2004										
3	Florida Gulf Coast	2013	2017	2016	2013	1								
3	Georgia Southern	1983	1992											
3	Jackson State	1997	2007											
3	Loyola (LA)	1954	1958											
3	Mercer	1981	2014	2014										
3	Niagara	1970	2007	2007	1970	1								
3	Northern Illinois	1982	1996											
3 (Note: Received an automatic bid in 2020 for winning the 2020 Horizon League men's basketball tournament but is not reflected in the totals when the NCAA canceled the 2020 NCAA Division I men's basketball tournament due to the COVID-19 pandemic.)	Northern Kentucky	2017	2023											
3	Prairie View A&M	1998	2026	2026										
3	Northwestern	2017	2024	2024										
3	Northwestern State	2001	2013	2006										
3	Radford	1998	2018	2018										
3	Rider	1984	1994											
3	Samford	1999	2024											
3	San Jose State	1951	1996		1951	1								
3	Southern Miss	1990	2012											
3	Tennessee State	1993	2026											
3	Texas A&M-Corpus Christi	2007	2023	2023										
3	Tulane	1992	1995	1995										
3	UIC	1998	2004											
3	UMBC	2008	2026	2018										
3	VMI	1964	1977	1977	1977	2	1976	1						
2	Abilene Christian	2019	2021	2021										
2	Brown	1939	1986				1939	1						
2	Bryant	2022	2025											
2	Cal State Northridge	2001	2009											
2	CCNY	1947	1950	1950			1950	2	1950	1	1950	1	1950	1
2	East Carolina	1972	1993											
2	Eastern Illinois	1992	2001											
2	Hardin-Simmons	1953	1957											
2	High Point	2025	2026	2026										
2	Jacksonville State	2017	2022											
2	Kennesaw State	2023	2026											
2	Lipscomb	2018	2025											
2	Longwood	2022	2024											
2	Loyola (MD)	1994	2012											
2	Marist	1986	1987											
2	Morgan State	2009	2010											
2	Nicholls	1995	1998											
2	Northern Arizona	1998	2000											
2	Portland	1959	1996											
2	Portland State	2008	2009											
2	Saint Francis	1991	2025											
2	Sam Houston	2003	2010											
2	Southeast Missouri State	2000	2023											
2	Stephen F. Austin (Note: Stephen F. Austin vacated the results of the 2015, 2016, and 2018 tournaments, of which it reached the Round of 32 in 2016.)	2009	2014	2014										
2	Tennessee Tech	1958	1963											
2	Texas State	1994	1997											
2	Towson	1990	1991											
2	UC Irvine	2015	2019	2019										
2	Wagner	2003	2024	2024										
1	Alabama A&M	2005	2005											
1	Arkansas State	1999	1999											
1	Binghamton	2009	2009											
1	Cal Baptist	2026	2026											
1	Cal Poly	2014	2014	2014										
1	Cal State Bakersfield	2016	2016											
1	Cal State Los Angeles	1974	1974											
1	Campbell	1992	1992											
1	Catholic	1944	1944				1944	1						
1	Charleston Southern	1997	1997											
1	Delaware State	2005	2005											
1	FIU	1995	1995											
1	Gardner–Webb	2019	2019											
1	Grambling State	2024	2024	2024										
1	Hartford	2021	2021											
1	Houston Christian	1984	1984											
1	IU Indy	2003	2003											
1	Lebanon Valley	1953	1953	1953	1953	1								
1	North Dakota	2017	2017											
1	North Florida	2015	2015											
1	Omaha	2025	2025											
1	Queens	2026	2026											
1	SIU Edwardsville	2025	2025											
1	Southeastern Louisiana	2005	2005											
1	Southern Utah	2001	2001											
1	Springfield	1940	1940				1940	1						
1	Stetson	2024	2024											
1	Stony Brook	2016	2016											
1	Trinity (TX)	1969	1969											
1	Tufts	1945	1945				1945	1						
1	UC Davis	2017	2017	2017										
1	UC San Diego	2025	2025											
1	UT Arlington	2008	2008											
1	Wayne State (MI)	1956	1956	1956	1956	1								
1	West Texas A&M	1955	1955											
1	Western Carolina	1996	1996											
1	Williams	1955	1955											
0	Arkansas-Pine Bluff (Note: Arkansas-Pine Bluff vacated the results of the 2010 tournament, including a First Four win. It is included in this table for consistency with other schools which have vacated appearances.)	2010	2010	2010										
0	Northern Colorado (Note: Northern Colorado vacated the results of the 2011 tournament. It is included in this table for consistency with other schools which have vacated appearances.)	2011	2011											
#	School	First bid	Bid	Win	Last	#	Last	#	Last	#	Last	#	Last	#
Bids by school		First bid	Most recent		Sweet 16		Elite 8		Final 4		Finals		Champions	

== Active schools with no bids ==
The schools shown in the tables below have never made it to the NCAA tournament. Several schools are not yet eligible for the NCAA tournament since NCAA rules state programs transitioning from NCAA Division II must wait three years after joining Division I (reduced from four in 2025) before they are eligible for championship tournaments. St. Thomas, making an unprecedented transition directly from Division III to Division I, completed its four-year transition (reduced from five) in July 2025.

=== Eligible ===
Below is a list of schools that have been eligible for at least one NCAA tournament but have never made it. There are 42 schools that have never made the NCAA tournament. Conference affiliations are current for the next NCAA season in 2026–27.

School	Current conference	First season	Number of seasons
Army (Note: Army turned down an invitation to the NCAA tournament in 1968.)	Patriot League	1903	121
Bellarmine (Note: Won the 2022 ASUN men's basketball tournament final but was ineligible because it was still within its transition period from Division II to Division I athletics.)	ASUN	2021	4
Bethune–Cookman	SWAC	1981	44
Central Arkansas	United	2011	14
Chicago State	NEC	1985	40
The Citadel	SoCon	1913	111
Denver	West Coast	1904	100
East Texas A&M	Southland	2022	3
Elon	CAA	2000	25
Incarnate Word	Southland	2014	11
Kansas City	Summit League	1990	35
Le Moyne	NEC	2024	3
Lindenwood	Ohio Valley	2022	3
Maine	America East	1904	79
Maryland Eastern Shore	MEAC	1974	44
UMass Lowell	America East	2014	11
Merrimack (Note: Won the 2023 Northeast Conference men's basketball tournament final but was ineligible because it was still within its transition period from Division II to Division I athletics.)	Metro	2020	5
New Hampshire	America East	1927	71
NJIT	America East	2010	15
North Alabama	United	2019	6
Presbyterian	Big South	2011	14
Purdue Fort Wayne	Horizon League	2003	22
Quinnipiac	Metro	1999	26
Sacramento State	Big West	1992	33
Sacred Heart	Metro	2000	25
South Dakota	Summit League	2011	14
Southern Indiana	Ohio Valley	2022	3
St. Thomas	Summit League	2022	3
Stonehill	NEC	2022	3
Tarleton State	United	2021	4
UC Riverside	Big West	2002	23
USC Upstate	Big South	2011	14
UT Martin	Ohio Valley	1993	32
UTRGV	Southland	1969	56
Utah Tech	Big Sky	2021	4
Utah Valley	Big West	2010	15
Western Illinois	Ohio Valley	1982	43
William & Mary	CAA	1906	118
Youngstown State	Horizon League	1948	77

=== Ineligible ===
Below is a list of schools that are active but not yet eligible for the NCAA tournament.

School	First season	Number of seasons	Eligible year
Mercyhurst	2024–25	2	2029
New Haven	2025–26	1	2029
West Florida	2026–27	0	2030
West Georgia	2024–25	2	2028

== Streaks ==
This is a list of the most consecutive appearances in the NCAA Division I men's basketball tournament by programs.

=== Consecutive appearances by team ===
Rank	Team	Length of streak	Years	Head coach(es)
1	Kansas*	36*	1990–present	Roy Williams (14), Bill Self (21)
2	Michigan State	28‡	1998–present	Tom Izzo
3	North Carolina	27	1975–2001	Dean Smith (23), Bill Guthridge (3), Matt Doherty (1)
4	Gonzaga	27‡	1999–present	Dan Monson (1), Mark Few (26)
5	Duke	24‡	1996–2019	Mike Krzyzewski
6	Wisconsin	19	1999–2017	Dick Bennett (2), Brad Soderberg (1), Bo Ryan (14), Greg Gard (2)
7	Indiana	18	1986–2003	Bob Knight (15), Mike Davis (3)
8	Kentucky	17	1992–2008	Rick Pitino (6), Tubby Smith (10), Billy Gillispie (1)
9	UCLA	15	1967–1981	John Wooden (9), Gene Bartow (2), Gary Cunningham (2), Larry Brown (2)
10 (tie)	Arizona*	14	1985–1998	Lute Olson
10 (tie)	Cincinnati	14	1992–2005	Bob Huggins
10 (tie)	Georgetown	14	1979–1992	John Thompson
10 (tie)	Texas	14	1999–2012	Rick Barnes
10 (tie)	UCLA	14	1989–2002	Jim Harrick (8), Steve Lavin (6)

Bold Indicates an active streak as of the 2026 tournament

*Kansas has appeared in 36 consecutive NCAA tournaments from 1990-2026, but its 2018 appearance, which ended in the Final Four, was vacated five years later due to use of a player, Silvio De Sousa, who was ruled ineligible retroactively.
*Arizona appeared in 25 consecutive tournaments from 1985 to 2009, but has since had seasons vacated for NCAA rules violations.
‡Streak impacted by COVID-19 pandemic which led to the cancellation of the 2020 tournament. No streak received credit for that year but all streaks were still considered active for teams that qualified for the 2021 Tournament.

=== Current consecutive appearances by team ===
Team	Consecutive appearances	Conference
Michigan State	28	Big Ten
Gonzaga	27	WCC
Purdue	11	Big Ten
Houston	8	Big 12
Tennessee	8	SEC
Kansas*	7	Big 12
Alabama	6	SEC
Illinois	6	Big Ten
Texas	6	SEC
UConn	6	Big East
Arizona	5	Big 12
Duke	5	ACC
Iowa State	5	Big 12
Kentucky	5	SEC
Saint Mary's	5	WCC

*Kansas has appeared in 35 consecutive NCAA tournaments from 1990-2025, but its 2018 appearance, which ended in the Final Four, was vacated five years later due to use of a player, Silvio De Sousa, who was ruled ineligible retroactively.

Table up to date through the 2026 NCAA tournament. Only schools with five or more consecutive appearances are included. Conference affiliations reflect those in the current 2025–26 NCAA season.

== Droughts ==
List of schools with the longest time between NCAA tournament appearances (minimum 20-year drought). Bold indicates an active current streak as of the 2026 tournament:

School	Appearance	Next appearance	Years
**Dartmouth**	**1959**	–	**67 years** (did not play the 2020–21 season)
Harvard	1946	2012	66 years
**Tennessee Tech**	**1963**	–	**63 years**
**Bowling Green**	**1968**	–	**58 years**
**Columbia**	**1968**	–	**58 years**
**Seattle**	**1969**	–	**57 years** (not in Division I in 29 of those years)
**Rice**	**1970**	–	**56 years**
Yale	1962	2016	54 years
**VMI**	**1977**	–	**49 years**
Brown	1939	1986	47 years
Stanford	1942	1989	47 years
Wisconsin	1947	1994	47 years
Duquesne	1977	2024	47 years
**Toledo**	**1980**	–	**46 years**
Furman	1980	2023	43 years
Lafayette	1957	1999	42 years
Air Force	1962	2004	42 years
**Houston Christian**	**1984**	–	**42 years** (not in Division I in 19 of those years)
Iowa State	1944	1985	41 years
**Brown**	**1986**	–	**40 years**
**Jacksonville**	**1986**	–	**40 years**
Washington State	1941	1980	39 years
Canisius	1957	1996	39 years
**Idaho State**	**1987**	–	**39 years**
**Marist**	**1987**	–	**39 years**
Baylor	1950	1988	38 years
Miami (FL)	1960	1998	38 years (no team 14 of those years)
Saint Louis	1957	1994	37 years
Portland	1959	1996	37 years
Drake	1971	2008	37 years
Idaho	1990	2026	36 years
**Loyola Marymount**	**1990**	–	**36 years**
Montana State	1951	1986	35 years
Manhattan	1958	1993	35 years
Butler	1962	1997	35 years
Niagara	1970	2005	35 years
**Louisiana Tech**	**1991**	–	**35 years**
**Towson**	**1991**	–	**35 years**
Cornell	1954	1988	34 years
Oregon	1961	1995	34 years
Saint Francis	1991	2025	34 years
**Campbell**	**1992**	–	**34 years**
**Fordham**	**1992**	–	**34 years**
**Georgia Southern**	**1992**	–	**34 years**
Loyola Chicago	1985	2018	33 years
**East Carolina**	**1993**	–	**33 years**
Georgetown	1943	1975	32 years
Missouri	1944	1976	32 years
Oklahoma	1947	1979	32 years
George Washington	1961	1993	32 years
Tennessee State	1994	2026	32 years
**Rider**	**1994**	–	**32 years**
Marshall	1987	2018	31 years
Howard	1992	2023	31 years
**FIU**	**1995**	–	**31 years**
**Tulane**	**1995**	–	**31 years**
Saint Mary's	1959	1989	30 years
California	1960	1990	30 years
Massachusetts	1962	1992	30 years
Cal State Fullerton	1978	2008	30 years
Rutgers	1991	2021	30 years
Santa Clara	1996	2026	30 years
**Canisius**	**1996**	–	**30 years**
**Louisiana–Monroe**	**1996**	–	**30 years**
**Northern Illinois**	**1996**	–	**30 years**
**Portland**	**1996**	–	**30 years**
**San Jose State**	**1996**	–	**30 years**
**Western Carolina**	**1996**	–	**30 years**
San Jose State	1951	1980	29 years
Mercer	1985	2014	29 years
**Charleston Southern**	**1997**	–	**29 years**
**Fairfield**	**1997**	–	**29 years**
**Texas State**	**1997**	–	**29 years**
Mississippi State	1963	1991	28 years
Colorado	1969	1997	28 years
**Eastern Michigan**	**1998**	–	**28 years**
**Illinois State**	**1998**	–	**28 years**
**Navy**	**1998**	–	**28 years**
**Nicholls**	**1998**	–	**28 years**
Tulsa	1955	1982	27 years
**Arkansas State**	**1999**	–	**27 years**
**Evansville**	**1999**	–	**27 years**
**Missouri State**	**1999**	–	**27 years**
Penn State	1965	1991	26 years
Eastern Kentucky	1979	2005	26 years
Oregon State	1990	2016	26 years
Montana State	1996	2022	26 years
**Ball State**	**2000**	–	**26 years**
**Northern Arizona**	**2000**	–	**26 years**
Arizona	1951	1976	25 years
LSU	1954	1979	25 years
Bradley	1955	1980	25 years
Georgia Tech	1960	1985	25 years
Navy	1960	1985	25 years
Morehead State	1984	2009	25 years
Drexel	1996	2021	25 years
Hofstra (Note: Received an automatic bid in 2020 for winning the 2020 CAA men's basketball tournament, but the NCAA canceled the 2020 NCAA Division I men's basketball tournament due to the COVID-19 pandemic.)	2001	2026	25 years
**Eastern Illinois**	**2001**	–	**25 years**
**Southern Utah**	**2001**	–	**25 years**
Boston University	1959	1983	24 years
Middle Tennessee	1989	2013	24 years
Northeastern	1991	2015	24 years
San Francisco	1998	2022	24 years
Samford	2000	2024	24 years
**Alcorn State**	**2002**	–	**24 years**
**Pepperdine**	**2002**	–	**24 years**
Utah State	1939	1962	23 years
Washington	1953	1976	23 years
Hofstra	1977	2000	23 years
Akron	1986	2009	23 years
Cleveland State	1986	2009	23 years
Colgate	1996	2019	23 years
Southeast Missouri State	2000	2023	23 years
**Central Michigan**	**2003**	–	**23 years**
**IU Indy**	**2003**	–	**23 years**
**South Carolina State**	**2003**	–	**23 years**
Morehead State	1961	1983	22 years
Xavier	1961	1983	22 years
Hawaii	1972	1994	22 years
Western Michigan	1976	1998	22 years
St. Bonaventure	1978	2000	22 years
Oral Roberts	1984	2006	22 years
SMU	1993	2015	22 years
McNeese	2002	2024	22 years
**UIC**	**2004**	–	**22 years**
**DePaul**	**2004**	–	**22 years**
Creighton	1941	1962	21 years
Holy Cross	1956	1977	21 years
East Tennessee State	1968	1989	21 years
Fordham	1971	1992	21 years
East Carolina	1972	1993	21 years
Appalachian State	1979	2000	21 years
Indiana State	1979	2000	21 years
Little Rock	1990	2011	21 years
Southern Miss	1991	2012	21 years
La Salle	1992	2013	21 years
Coastal Carolina	1993	2014	21 years
New Orleans	1996	2017	21 years
Prairie View A&M	1998	2019	21 years
Appalachian State	2000	2021	21 years
Florida Atlantic	2002	2023	21 years
Wagner	2003	2024	21 years
**Alabama A&M**	**2005**	–	**21 years**
**Charlotte**	**2005**	–	**21 years**
**Delaware State**	**2005**	–	**21 years**
**Southeastern Louisiana**	**2005**	–	**21 years**
Western Kentucky	1940	1960	20 years
Colorado State	1969	1989	20 years
Baylor	1988	2008	20 years
Cornell	1988	2008	20 years
South Florida	1992	2012	20 years
Green Bay	1996	2016	20 years
TCU	1998	2018	20 years
**Air Force**	**2006**	–	**20 years**
**Monmouth**	**2006**	–	**20 years**

== See also ==
- NCAA Division I women's basketball tournament bids by school
- List of NCAA Division II men's basketball tournament bids by school
- List of NCAA Division III men's basketball tournament bids by school
