= 1953–54 Penn State Nittany Lions basketball team =

American college basketball season

1953–54 Penn State Nittany Lions men's basketball

NCAA Tournament Final Four
- Conference: Independent

Ranking
- AP: No. 9
- Record: 18–6
- Head coach: Elmer Gross (5th season)
- Captain: Jack Sherry
- Home arena: Rec Hall

1953–54 NCAA men's basketball independents standings
	Conf.				Overall
Team	W		L	PCT	W		L	PCT
No. 3 Holy Cross		–		–	26	–	2	.929
No. 17 Seattle		–		–	26	–	2	.929
No. 5 Duquesne		–		–	26	–	3	.897
No. 6 Notre Dame		–		–	22	–	3	.880
No. 2 La Salle		–		–	26	–	4	.867
Dayton		–		–	25	–	7	.781
Louisville		–		–	22	–	7	.759
No. 9 Penn State		–		–	18	–	6	.750
Oklahoma City		–		–	18	–	7	.720
Navy		–		–	18	–	8	.692
Army		–		–	15	–	7	.682
Villanova		–		–	20	–	11	.645
Lafayette		–		–	17	–	10	.630
Saint Joseph's		–		–	14	–	9	.609
Xavier		–		–	18	–	12	.600
No. 7 Bradley		–		–	19	–	13	.594
John Carroll		–		–	15	–	11	.577
Seton Hall		–		–	13	–	10	.565
Temple		–		–	15	–	12	.556
Muhlenberg		–		–	12	–	10	.545
Washington University		–		–	12	–	10	.545
Syracuse		–		–	10	–	9	.526
Cincinnati		–		–	11	–	10	.524
DePaul		–		–	11	–	10	.524
Iona		–		–	11	–	10	.524
Butler		–		–	13	–	12	.520
Boston College		–		–	11	–	11	.500
Loyola (Calif.)		–		–	14	–	16	.467
Rutgers		–		–	11	–	13	.458
Creighton		–		–	14	–	17	.452
Gonzaga		–		–	12	–	15	.444
Valparaiso		–		–	10	–	13	.435
Marquette		–		–	11	–	15	.423
Lehigh		–		–	8	–	12	.400
Pittsburgh		–		–	9	–	14	.391
Georgetown		–		–	11	–	18	.379
Siena		–		–	7	–	14	.333
Portland		–		–	9	–	19	.321
Loyola (IL)		–		–	7	–	15	.318
Drake		–		–	7	–	16	.304
Colgate		–		–	5	–	12	.294
Bucknell		–		–	4	–	16	.200
Rankings from AP Poll

The 1953–54 Penn State Nittany Lions basketball team represented Pennsylvania State University in intercollegiate basketball during the 1953–54 season. The team finished the season with an 18–6 record and made it to the 1954 NCAA tournament's Final Four, their only Final Four appearance in school history. Penn State posted an upset of eighth-ranked Louisiana State University and ended Notre Dame's 18-game winning streak to advance to Kansas City where they eventually finished third after a loss to eventual champion La Salle.

== Schedule and results ==
Date time, TV	Rank^{#}	Opponent^{#}	Result	Record	Site city, state
Regular season
12/5/1953*		Washington & Jefferson	W 66–41	1–0	Rec Hall; University Park, PA
12/12/1953*		at Penn	W 72–67	2–0	Palestra; Philadelphia, PA
12/18/1953*		at American	W 65–52	3–0	Washington, D.C.
12/19/1953*		at NC State	L 74–89	3–1	Reynolds Coliseum; Raleigh, NC
1/6/1954*		Syracuse	W 77–63	4–1	Rec Hall; University Park, PA
1/9/1954*		Colgate	W 78–58	5–1	Rec Hall; University Park, PA
1/13/1954*		at West Virginia	W 74–66	6–1	WVU Fieldhouse; Morgantown, WV
1/16/1954*		at Navy	L 58–62	6–2	Annapolis, MD
1/27/1954*		at Bucknell	W 49–43	7–2	Lewisburg, PA
1/28/1954*		Pittsburgh	W 91–85 ^{3OT}	8–2	Rec Hall; University Park, PA
2/3/1954*		at Gettysburg	W 64–51	9–2	Gettysburg, PA
2/6/1954*		West Virginia	W 85–68	10–2	Rec Hall; University Park, PA
2/13/1954*		at Pittsburgh	L 62–74	10–3	Fitzgerald Field House; Pittsburgh, PA
2/19/1954*		at Colgate	L 63–75	10–4	Hamilton, NY
2/20/1954*		at Syracuse	L 69–71	10–5	Archbold Gymnasium; Syracuse, NY
2/24/1954*		Gettysburg	W 76–67	11–5	Rec Hall; University Park, PA
2/27/1954*		Rutgers	W 76–59	12–5	Rec Hall; University Park, PA
3/4/1954*		Georgetown	W 61–54	13–5	Rec Hall; University Park, PA
3/6/1954*		Temple	W 67–52	14–5	Rec Hall; University Park, PA
1954 NCAA Tournament
3/9/1954*		vs. Toledo; NCAA first round	W 62–50	15–5	Allen County War Memorial Coliseum; Fort Wayne, IN
3/12/1954*		vs. No. 14 LSU; NCAA Quarterfinals	W 78–70	16–5	Iowa Field House; Iowa City, IA
3/13/1954*		vs. No. 6 Notre Dame; NCAA Quarterfinals	W 71–63	17–5	Iowa Field House; Iowa City, IA
3/19/1954*		vs. No. 2 La Salle; NCAA Final Four	L 54–69	17–6	Municipal Auditorium; Kansas City, MO
3/20/1954*		vs. No. 11 USC; NCAA third-place game	W 70–61	18–6	Municipal Auditorium; Kansas City, MO
*Non-conference game. ^{#}Rankings from AP Poll. (#) Tournament seedings in parentheses.
