= 1953–54 Georgetown Hoyas men's basketball team =

American college basketball season

1953–54 Georgetown Hoyas men's basketball
- Conference: Independent
- Record: 11–18
- Head coach: Harry "Buddy" Jeannette (2nd season)
- Assistant coach: Hugh Beins (1st season)
- Captains: Joe Carroll; Lou Gigante
- Home arena: McDonough Gymnasium

1953–54 NCAA men's basketball independents standings
	Conf.				Overall
Team	W		L	PCT	W		L	PCT
No. 3 Holy Cross		–		–	26	–	2	.929
No. 17 Seattle		–		–	26	–	2	.929
No. 5 Duquesne		–		–	26	–	3	.897
No. 6 Notre Dame		–		–	22	–	3	.880
No. 2 La Salle		–		–	26	–	4	.867
Dayton		–		–	25	–	7	.781
Louisville		–		–	22	–	7	.759
No. 9 Penn State		–		–	18	–	6	.750
Oklahoma City		–		–	18	–	7	.720
Navy		–		–	18	–	8	.692
Army		–		–	15	–	7	.682
Villanova		–		–	20	–	11	.645
Lafayette		–		–	17	–	10	.630
Saint Joseph's		–		–	14	–	9	.609
Xavier		–		–	18	–	12	.600
No. 7 Bradley		–		–	19	–	13	.594
John Carroll		–		–	15	–	11	.577
Seton Hall		–		–	13	–	10	.565
Temple		–		–	15	–	12	.556
Muhlenberg		–		–	12	–	10	.545
Washington University		–		–	12	–	10	.545
Syracuse		–		–	10	–	9	.526
Cincinnati		–		–	11	–	10	.524
DePaul		–		–	11	–	10	.524
Iona		–		–	11	–	10	.524
Butler		–		–	13	–	12	.520
Boston College		–		–	11	–	11	.500
Loyola (Calif.)		–		–	14	–	16	.467
Rutgers		–		–	11	–	13	.458
Creighton		–		–	14	–	17	.452
Gonzaga		–		–	12	–	15	.444
Valparaiso		–		–	10	–	13	.435
Marquette		–		–	11	–	15	.423
Lehigh		–		–	8	–	12	.400
Pittsburgh		–		–	9	–	14	.391
Georgetown		–		–	11	–	18	.379
Siena		–		–	7	–	14	.333
Portland		–		–	9	–	19	.321
Loyola (IL)		–		–	7	–	15	.318
Drake		–		–	7	–	16	.304
Colgate		–		–	5	–	12	.294
Bucknell		–		–	4	–	16	.200
Rankings from AP Poll

The 1953–54 Georgetown Hoyas men's basketball team represented Georgetown University during the 1953–54 NCAA college basketball season. Harry "Buddy" Jeannette coached them in his second season as head coach. The team was an independent and played its home games at McDonough Gymnasium on the Georgetown campus in Washington, D.C. The team finished the season with a record of 11–18 and had no postseason play.

== Season recap ==
Sophomore forward Warren Buehler joined the varsity team as a starter after a year on the freshman team, replacing star Bill Bolger, who had graduated after the previous season. Destined to become the top Georgetown scorer of the 1950s, Buehler got off to a quick start, ending the season as the team's top scorer for the first of two consecutive seasons. Playing in 28 of the season's 29 games, he scored in double figures 26 times, including 29 points each against Pittsburgh and Duquesne, 30 against Detroit, and a career-high 36 points against Virginia – in a game which Georgetown nonetheless lost when Virginia's Buzzy Wilkinson scored 45 points against the Hoyas. By the end of the year, Buehler had scored a Georgetown-record 511 points and averaged 18.2 points per game, second in school history.

Senior guard and team co-captain Lou Gigante had starred for the team during the two previous seasons, and began another strong season this year, averaging in double figures. During the game against New York University at Madison Square Garden in New York City on January 12, 1954, however, he broke his foot, ending his season and collegiate career. He had averaged 9.2 points per game during his three varsity seasons.

The previous season, Georgetown had made its first-ever appearance in the National Invitation Tournament and its first post-season tournament appearance since the 1942–43 team went to the 1943 NCAA Tournament. In sharp contrast, this season was a disappointment: In the face of academic losses and injuries that would plague the Hoyas throughout the last three seasons of Buddy Jeannette's four-year tenure as head coach – in addition to losing Gigante to an injury, the team lost one of its top scorers at midseason to an academic suspension – the Hoyas finished with a record of 11–18 and had no post-season play. They were not ranked in the Top 20 in the Associated Press Poll or Coaches' Poll at any time.

== Roster ==
After senior guard Lou Gigante suffered an injury, senior guard Jim Frisby replaced him on the team. Both wore No. 13 during the season.

#	Name	Height	Weight (lbs.)	Position	Class	Hometown	Previous Team(s)
5	Warren Buehler	6"4"	185	F	So.	Bayonne, NJ, U.S.	Sweeney HS
6	Tommy Doyle	6'0"	N/A	F	Sr.	New York, NY, U.S.	St. Francis Preparatory School
8	Tom Heyman	N/A	N/A	F	So.	N/A	N/A
9	Bob Scott	N/A	N/A	F	Sr.	N/A	N/A
10	Jack Vail	6'0"	N/A	C	Jr.	South Amboy, NJ, U.S.	St. Mary High School
11	John Morchower	6'7"	N/A	G	So.	Bayonne, NJ, U.S.	Sweeney HS
12	Joe Bolger	6'3"	N/A	G	Jr.	New York, NY, U.S.	Xavier HS
13	Lou Gigante	5'9"	N/A	G	Sr.	New York, NY, U.S.	Cardinal Hayes HS
13	Jim Frisby	6'0	N/A	G	Sr.	Washington, DC, U.S.	Gonzaga College HS
14	Frank Major	N/A	N/A	G	Jr.	Washington, DC, U.S.	St. John's HS
17	Bill Cowley	N/A	N/A	F	So.	N/A	N/A
20	Jack Walsh	5'11"	N/A	F	So.	New York, NY, U.S.	Brooklyn Preparatory School
21	Dale Seymour	6'5"	N/A	G	Fr.	Washington, DC, U.S.	Gonzaga College HS
22	Joe Carroll	N/A	N/A	G	Sr.	Baltimore, MD, U.S.	Calvert Hall College HS
N/A	Daniel Grochowski (also spelled Grohoski)	6,1	N/A	F	Jr.	Glen Lyon, PA, U.S.	N/A

== 1953–54 schedule and results ==
Date time, TV	Rank^{#}	Opponent^{#}	Result	Record	Site city, state
Regular Season
Wed., Dec. 2, 1953 no, no		Baltimore	W 110–59	1-0	McDonough Gymnasium; Washington, DC
Sat., Dec. 5, 1953 no, no		Saint Peter's	W 69–60	2-0	McDonough Gymnasium; Washington, DC
Mon., Dec. 7, 1953 no, no		Mount St. Mary's	W 93–83	3-0	McDonough Gymnasium; Washington, DC
Sat., Dec. 12, 1953 no, no		St. Joseph's	W 75–71	4-0	McDonough Gymnasium; Washington, DC
Mon., Dec. 14, 1953 no, no		Xavier	L 54–74	4-1	McDonough Gymnasium; Washington, DC
Wed., Dec. 16, 1953 no, no		Loyola Maryland	W 92–79	5-1	McDonough Gymnasium; Washington, DC
Fri., Dec. 18, 1953 no, no		at No. 20 La Salle	L 49–58	5-2	Philadelphia Convention Hall; Philadelphia, PA
Mon., Dec. 28, 1953 no, no		vs. Detroit; Motor City Tournament	L 66–72	5-3	Detroit Olympia; Detroit, MI
Tue., Dec. 29, 1953 no, no		vs. Wayne State; Motor City Tournament	L 48–62	5-4	Detroit Olympia; Detroit, MI
Thu., Jan. 7, 1954 no, no		at No. 12 George Washington	L 64–88	5-5	Uline Arena; Washington, DC
Sat., Jan. 9, 1954 no, no		Maryland	W 58–56	6-5	McDonough Gymnasium; Washington, DC
Tue., Jan. 12, 1954 no, no		at New York University	W 75–67	7-5	Madison Square Garden; New York, NY
Sat., Jan. 16, 1954 no, no		American	W 59–46	8-5	McDonough Gymnasium; Washington, DC
Sat., Jan. 23, 1954* no, no		at St. Francis (NY)	L 52–77	8-6	II Corps Armory; Brooklyn, NY
Wed., Jan. 27, 1954 no, no		at No. 2 Duquesne	L 56–69	8-7	Duquesne Gardens; Pittsburgh, PA
Thu., Jan. 28, 1954 no, no		at Youngstown State	L 74–78	8-8	South Field House; Youngstown, OH
Sat., Jan. 30, 1954 no, no		at John Carroll	L 88–97	8-9	Cleveland Arena; Cleveland, OH
Tue., Feb. 2, 1954 no, no		Pittsburgh	L 73–80	8-10	McDonough Gymnasium; Washington, DC
Sat., Feb. 6, 1954 no, no		at Fordham	L 51–68	8-11	Rose Hill Gymnasium; Bronx, NY
Wed., Feb. 10, 1954 no, no		at No. 16 Navy	L 75–110	8-12	Dahlgren Hall; Annapolis, MD
Sat., Feb. 13, 1954 no, no		Virginia	L 78–85	8-13	McDonough Gymnasium; Washington, DC
Tue., Feb. 16, 1954 no, no		at Mount St. Mary's	W 65-54	9-13	Alumni Gymnasium; Emmitsburg, MD
Thu., Feb. 18, 1954 no, no		at No. 11 Maryland	L 50–53	9-14	Ritchie Coliseum; College Park, MD
Sat., Feb. 20, 1954 no, no		Niagara	L 56–69	9-15	McDonough Gymnasium; Washington, DC
Wed., Feb. 24, 1954 no, no		at American	W 56–49	10-15	Clendenen Gymnasium; Washington, DC
Sat., Feb. 27, 1954 no, no		Temple	W 61–59	11-15	McDonough Gymnasium; Washington, DC
Tue., Mar. 2, 1954 no, no		No. 9 George Washington	L 67–79	11-16	McDonough Gymnasium; Washington, DC
Thu., Mar. 4, 1954 no, no		at Penn State	L 54–61	11-17	Recreation Hall; State College, PA
Sat., Mar. 6, 1954 no, no		at Saint Francis (Pa.)	L 80–109	11-18	Doyle Hall; Loretto, PA
*Non-conference game. ^{#}Rankings from AP Poll. (#) Tournament seedings in parentheses.
