= Rice Owls men's basketball =

Intercollegiate men's basketball program of Rice University

2026–27 Rice Owls men's basketball team
- University: Rice University
- First season: 1914–15
- Head coach: Rob Lanier (3rd season)
- Location: Houston, Texas
- Arena: Tudor Fieldhouse (capacity: 5,208)
- Conference: The American
- Nickname: Owls
- Colors: Blue and gray
- Student section: The Nest
- All-time record: 1,189–1,525 (.438)

NCAA Division I tournament Elite Eight
- 1940, (Note: The 1940 NCAA tournament comprised two regions of four teams each, i.e. a total of eight teams. After losing the West Region semifinal, Rice won the regional third-place game.) 1942
Other NCAA Division I tournament results
Sweet Sixteen	1954 (Note: The 1954 NCAA tournament comprised 24 teams in four regions, each of which had between five and seven teams. Rice received a bye directly to the West-2 Region semifinal, which was the round of 16. After losing the regional semifinal game, Rice won the regional third-place game.)
Appearances	1940, 1942, 1954, 1970

Conference regular-season champions
- 1918, 1935, 1940, 1942, 1943, 1944, 1945, 1949, 1954, 1970

Uniforms
Home	Away

The Rice Owls men's basketball program is the intercollegiate men's basketball program of Rice University. The program is classified in the NCAA's Division I, and the team competes in the American Athletic Conference. They previously participated in the Southwest Conference (1914–1996), the Western Athletic Conference (1996–2005), and Conference USA (2005–2023).

The Owls play their home games in Tudor Fieldhouse, which they have called home since 1950. Previously known as Rice Gymnasium, it was renamed in honor of Rice alum Bobby Tudor, who spearheaded the 2008 renovation of the facility with a multimillion-dollar donation. Rice has appeared four times in the NCAA Division I men's basketball tournament, most recently in 1970. Their 54 years without making the Tournament is currently the fifth longest in active history.

Rice has never reached a conference tournament final in any of the conferences they have played in (Southwest, WAC, Conference USA, The American).

== Head coaches ==
Head Coach	Years	Win–loss	Pct.
Robert Cummings	1914–1917	30–11	.732
Wilbur Tisdale	1917–1919	14–14	.500
Leslie Mann	1919–1920	6–6	.500
Pete Cawthon	1920–1921	5–10	.333
Howard Yerges Sr.	1921–1922	2–12	.143
Philip Arbuckle	1922–1923	10–9	.526
Franklyn Ashcraft	1923–1924	3–17	.150
John Patrick Nicholson	1924–1925	2–12	.143
Franklyn Ashcraft	1925–1927	1–22	.043
Russell Daugherty	1927–1932	25–46	.352
James Kitts	1932–1938	48–56	.462
Buster Brannon	1938–1942	68–20	.773
Joe Davis	1942–1945	52–10	.839
Buster Brannon	1945–1946	17–16	.515
Joe Davis	1946–1949	31–46	.403
Don Suman	1949–1959	149–106	.584
John Frankie	1959–1963	39–54	.419
George Carlisle	1963–1966	18–53	.254
Don Knodel	1966–1974	77–126	.379
Bob Polk	1974–1977	17–63	.212
Mike Schuler	1977–1981	30–76	.283
Tommy Suitts	1981–1987	64–106	.376
Scott Thompson	1987–1992	65–79	.451
Willis Wilson	1992–2008	219–246	.471
Ben Braun	2008–2014	63–128	.330
Mike Rhoades	2014–2017	47–52	.474
Scott Pera	2017–2024	96–127	.430
Rob Lanier	2024–present	17-25	.404

== Postseason history ==
=== NCAA tournament results ===
The Owls have appeared in four NCAA tournaments. Their combined record is 2–5, with their only wins coming in third-place games, a practice that no longer exists. Their drought of 56 years is the eighth longest drought between appearances in the NCAA Division I tournament history.

Year	Round	Opponent	Result
1940	First round Regional third-place game	Kansas; Colorado	L 44–50; W 60–56
1942	First round Regional third-place game	Stanford; Kansas	L 47–53; L 53–55
1954	Sweet Sixteen; Regional third-place game	Oklahoma A&M; Colorado	L 45–51; W 78–55
1970	First round	New Mexico State	L 77–101

=== NIT results ===
The Owls have appeared in five National Invitation Tournaments. Their combined record is 1–5.

Year	Round	Opponent	Result
1943	Quarterfinals	St. John's	L 49–51
1991	First round	Arkansas State	L 71–78
1993	First round Second round	Wisconsin; Boston College	W 77–73; L 68–101
2004	Opening Round	UW-Milwaukee	L 53–91
2005	Opening Round	Southwest Missouri State	L 82–105

=== CBI results ===
The Owls have appeared in three College Basketball Invitational (CBI) tournaments. Their combined record is 2–3.

Year	Round	Opponent	Result
2017	First round Quarterfinals	San Francisco; Utah Valley	W 85–76; L 79–85
2022	First round	Ohio	L 64–65
2023	First round Quarterfinals	Duquesne; Southern Utah	W 84–78; L 79–81

=== CIT results ===
The Owls have appeared in one CollegeInsider.com Postseason Tournament (CIT). Their combined record is 2–1.

Year	Round	Opponent	Result
2012	First round Second round Quarterfinals	Louisiana-Lafayette; Drake; Oakland	W 68–63; W 74–68; L 70–77

== Players of note ==
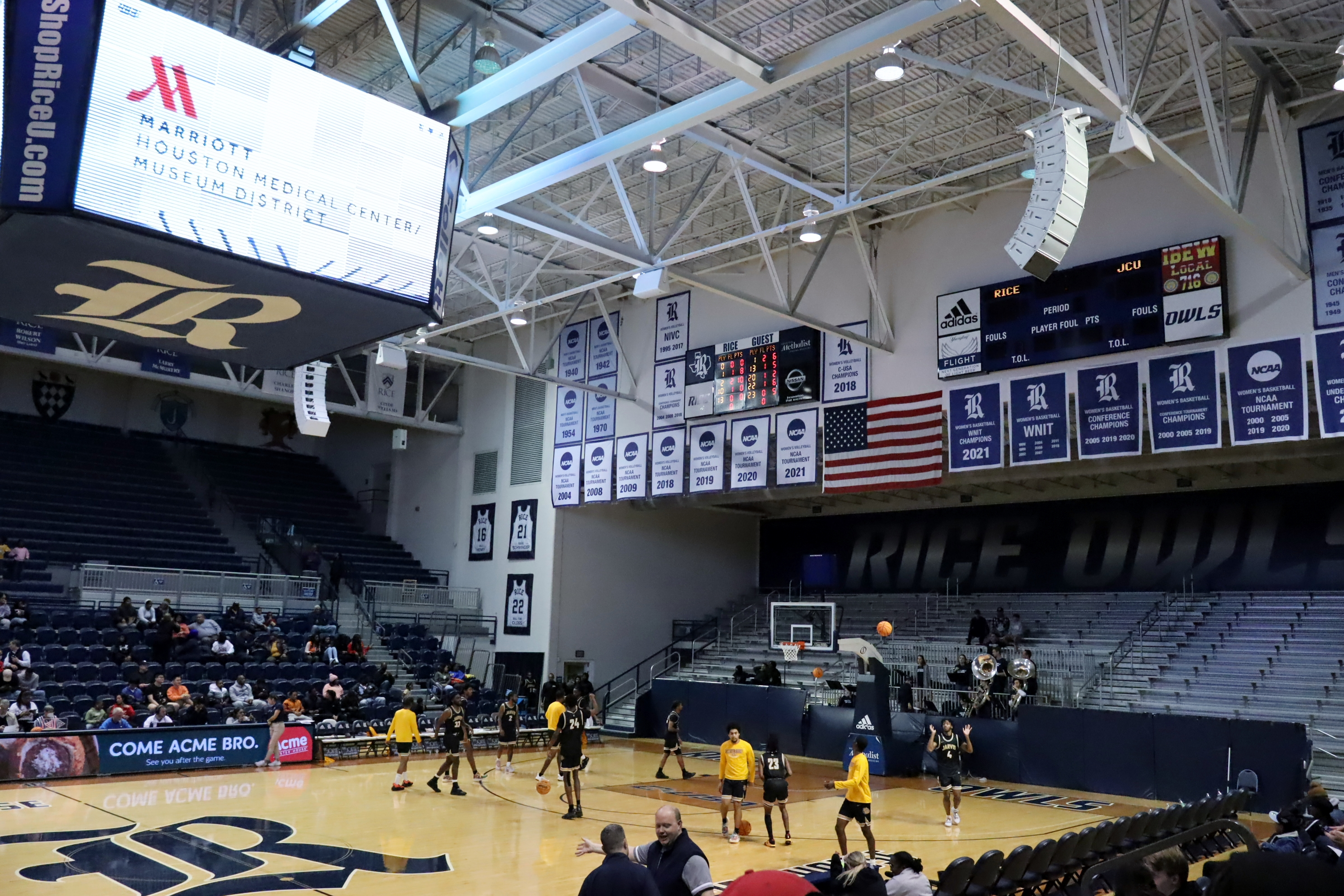
Tudor Fieldhouse before a men's basketball game in 2022

=== Owls in the NBA ===
- Morris Almond
- Ken Austin
- Bill Closs
- Mike Harris
- Bill Henry
- Bob Kinney
- Trey Murphy III
- Ricky Pierce
- Brent Scott
- Mike Wilks
- Drew Peterson
- Quincy Olivari

=== Owls in international basketball ===
- Suleiman Braimoh (born 1989), Nigerian-American in the Israel Basketball Premier League
- Egor Koulechov (born 1994), Israeli-Russian basketball player for Israeli team Ironi Nahariya

=== Politicians ===
- Glenn Youngkin (born 1966), 74th Governor of Virginia

=== Retired numbers ===
Rice University has retired six numbers.

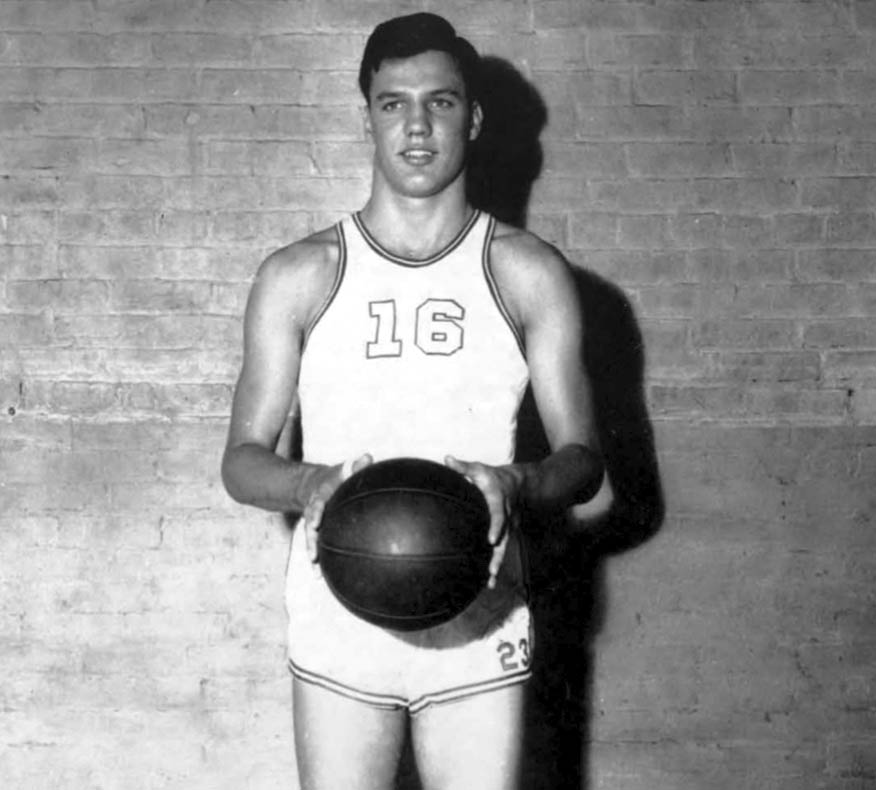
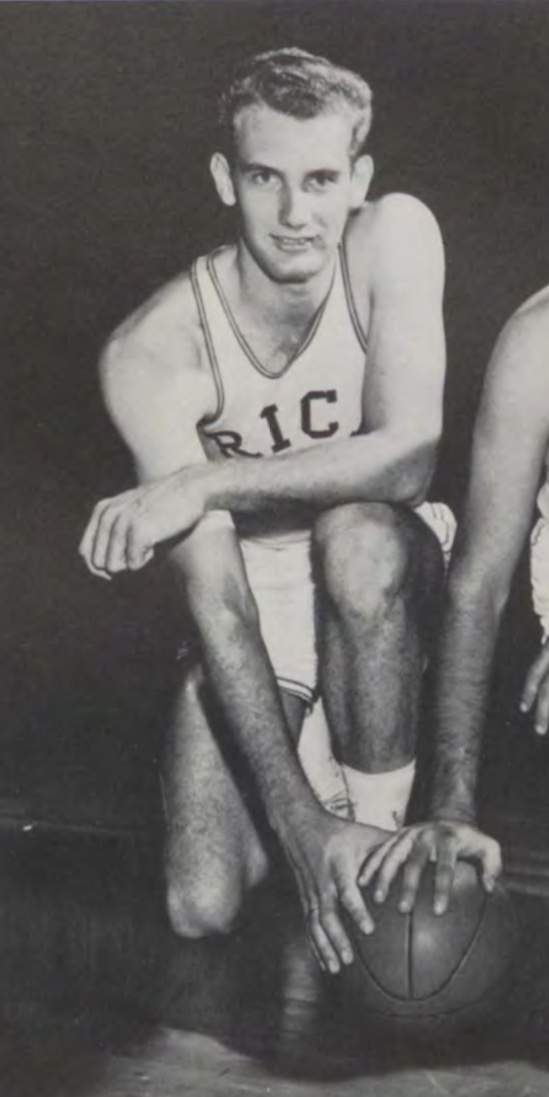
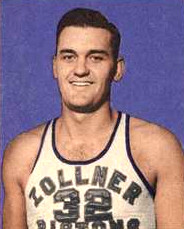
Bill Henry, Gene Schwinger, and Bob Kiney, whose numbers were retired by Rice

No.	Player	Tenure	Ref.
16	Bill Henry	1942–45	
21	Gene Schwinger	1951–54	
22	Bill Closs	1939–43	
23	Bob Kinney	1938–42	
25	Ricky Pierce	1979–82	
29	Don Lance	1951–54	
