= Jack Sherry =

John E. "Jack" Sherry was a two sport star at Pennsylvania State University (Penn State). In American football, he set a team record with 8 interceptions in 1952. In basketball, he was team captain of Penn State's team that reached the 1954 Final Four.

In 1952, Sherry intercepted 8 passes, returned for 101 yards. In 1954, he led Penn State in receiving yards and tied for the team lead in receptions (11 catches for 160 yards, 14.5 average, 1 touchdown).

In the 1954 NCAA Men's Division I Basketball Tournament, Penn State defeated Toledo (62-50), LSU (78-70) and Notre Dame (71-63) to make the Final Four. They were defeated by La Salle (69-54) but defeated USC (70-61) for third place.

Sherry is a member of the West Philadelphia Catholic High School Sports Hall of Fame.
