= Royner Greene =

American basketball and baseball coach (1905–1979)

Biographical details
- Born: May 2, 1905
- Died: February 4, 1979 (aged 73); Crystal Lake, Illinois, U.S.

Playing career

Basketball
- 1926–1929: Illinois

Coaching career (HC unless noted)

Basketball
- 1946–1959: Cornell
- 1960–1967: North Park

Baseball
- 1949–1956: Cornell
- 1967–1969: North Park

Head coaching record
- Overall: 232–216 (basketball); 102–93–3 (baseball)
- Tournaments: Basketball; 0–2 (NCAA)

Accomplishments and honors

Championships
- Basketball; EIBL (1954)

Royner C. Greene (May 2, 1905 – February 4, 1979) was a college men's basketball and baseball coach. He was the head coach of Cornell from 1946 to 1959. He coached Cornell to a 165–143 record, winning one Eastern Intercollegiate Basketball League championship and one NCAA tournament appearance. He also served as a high school coach prior to and after his time at Cornell.

== Head coaching record ==
=== Basketball ===
Record table
Season	Team	Overall	Conference	Standing	Postseason
Cornell Big Red (Eastern Intercollegiate Basketball League) (1946–1955)
1946–47	Cornell	14–8	8–4	2nd	
1947–48	Cornell	16–9	9–3	2nd	
1948–49	Cornell	11–15	5–7	5th	
1949–50	Cornell	18–7	7–5	T–3rd	
1950–51	Cornell	20–5	12–2	2nd	
1951–52	Cornell	16–9	8–4	3rd	
1952–53	Cornell	9–12	6–6	T–3rd	
1953–54	Cornell	17–7	11–3	1st	NCAA Regional Fourth Place
1954–55	Cornell	10–13	8–6	5th	
Cornell Big Red (Ivy League) (1955–1959)
1955–56	Cornell	11–13	8–6	4th	
1956–57	Cornell	4–19	2–12	8th	
1957–58	Cornell	11–11	5–9	T–6th	
1958–59	Cornell	8–15	4–10	T–6th	
Cornell:		165–143 (.536)	92–77 (.544)		
North Park Vikings (Independent) (1960–1967)
1960–61	North Park	11–8			
1961–62	North Park	10–8			
1962–63	North Park	8–13			
1963–64	North Park	7–16			
1964–65	North Park	11–10			
1965–65	North Park	9–11			
1966–67	North Park	15–7			
North Park:		71–73 (.493)			
Total:		236–216 (.522)			
National champion Postseason invitational champion Conference regular season champion Conference regular season and conference tournament champion Division regular season champion Division regular season and conference tournament champion Conference tournament champion
