= 1953–54 La Salle Explorers men's basketball team =

American college basketball season

1953–54 La Salle Explorers men's basketball

NCAA tournament National champions

National Championship Game, W 92–76 vs. Bradley
- Conference: Independent

Ranking
- AP: No. 2
- Record: 26–4
- Head coach: Ken Loeffler (5th season)

1953–54 NCAA men's basketball independents standings
| | Conf. | | | | Overall |
| Team | W | | L | PCT | W | | L | PCT |
|---|---|---|---|---|---|---|---|---|
| No. 3 Holy Cross | | – | | – | 26 | – | 2 | .929 |
| No. 17 Seattle | | – | | – | 26 | – | 2 | .929 |
| No. 5 Duquesne | | – | | – | 26 | – | 3 | .897 |
| No. 6 Notre Dame | | – | | – | 22 | – | 3 | .880 |
| No. 2 La Salle | | – | | – | 26 | – | 4 | .867 |
| Dayton | | – | | – | 25 | – | 7 | .781 |
| Louisville | | – | | – | 22 | – | 7 | .759 |
| No. 9 Penn State | | – | | – | 18 | – | 6 | .750 |
| Oklahoma City | | – | | – | 18 | – | 7 | .720 |
| Navy | | – | | – | 18 | – | 8 | .692 |
| Army | | – | | – | 15 | – | 7 | .682 |
| Villanova | | – | | – | 20 | – | 11 | .645 |
| Lafayette | | – | | – | 17 | – | 10 | .630 |
| Saint Joseph's | | – | | – | 14 | – | 9 | .609 |
| Xavier | | – | | – | 18 | – | 12 | .600 |
| No. 7 Bradley | | – | | – | 19 | – | 13 | .594 |
| John Carroll | | – | | – | 15 | – | 11 | .577 |
| Seton Hall | | – | | – | 13 | – | 10 | .565 |
| Temple | | – | | – | 15 | – | 12 | .556 |
| Muhlenberg | | – | | – | 12 | – | 10 | .545 |
| Washington University | | – | | – | 12 | – | 10 | .545 |
| Syracuse | | – | | – | 10 | – | 9 | .526 |
| Cincinnati | | – | | – | 11 | – | 10 | .524 |
| DePaul | | – | | – | 11 | – | 10 | .524 |
| Iona | | – | | – | 11 | – | 10 | .524 |
| Butler | | – | | – | 13 | – | 12 | .520 |
| Boston College | | – | | – | 11 | – | 11 | .500 |
| Loyola (Calif.) | | – | | – | 14 | – | 16 | .467 |
| Rutgers | | – | | – | 11 | – | 13 | .458 |
| Creighton | | – | | – | 14 | – | 17 | .452 |
| Gonzaga | | – | | – | 12 | – | 15 | .444 |
| Valparaiso | | – | | – | 10 | – | 13 | .435 |
| Marquette | | – | | – | 11 | – | 15 | .423 |
| Lehigh | | – | | – | 8 | – | 12 | .400 |
| Pittsburgh | | – | | – | 9 | – | 14 | .391 |
| Georgetown | | – | | – | 11 | – | 18 | .379 |
| Siena | | – | | – | 7 | – | 14 | .333 |
| Portland | | – | | – | 9 | – | 19 | .321 |
| Loyola (IL) | | – | | – | 7 | – | 15 | .318 |
| Drake | | – | | – | 7 | – | 16 | .304 |
| Colgate | | – | | – | 5 | – | 12 | .294 |
| Bucknell | | – | | – | 4 | – | 16 | .200 |
Rankings from AP Poll

The 1953–54 La Salle Explorers men's basketball team represented La Salle University in the 1953–54 NCAA men's basketball season. The team's head coach was Ken Loeffler. La Salle won the 1954 NCAA basketball tournament.

== Season summary ==
Some basketball historians have called La Salle star Tom Gola the Magic Johnson of his day because, at 6'7", he could play all five positions. But not even Magic piled up the kind of numbers Gola did in leading the Explorers to the 1954 national championship – 21.7 points and 23 rebounds per game. Guard Frank O’Hara was Gola's capable running mate along with five sophomores who played complementary roles.

Sophomore Robert Ames, later a CIA official killed in the 1983 bombing of the United States embassy in Beirut, Lebanon, averaged two points and one rebound in 14 games for the Explorers.

== NCAA tournament ==
- West
  - La Salle 76, Fordham 74
  - La Salle 88, NC State 81
  - La Salle 64, Navy 48
- Final Four
  - La Salle 69, Penn State 54
  - La Salle 92, Bradley 76

== Awards and honors ==
- Tom Gola, NCAA Men's MOP Award

== Team players drafted into the NBA ==
| Round | Pick | Player | NBA club |
|---|---|---|---|
| 11 | 93 | Frank O'Hara | Philadelphia Warriors |
