= 1953–54 Bradley Braves men's basketball team =

American college basketball season

1953–54 Bradley Braves men's basketball
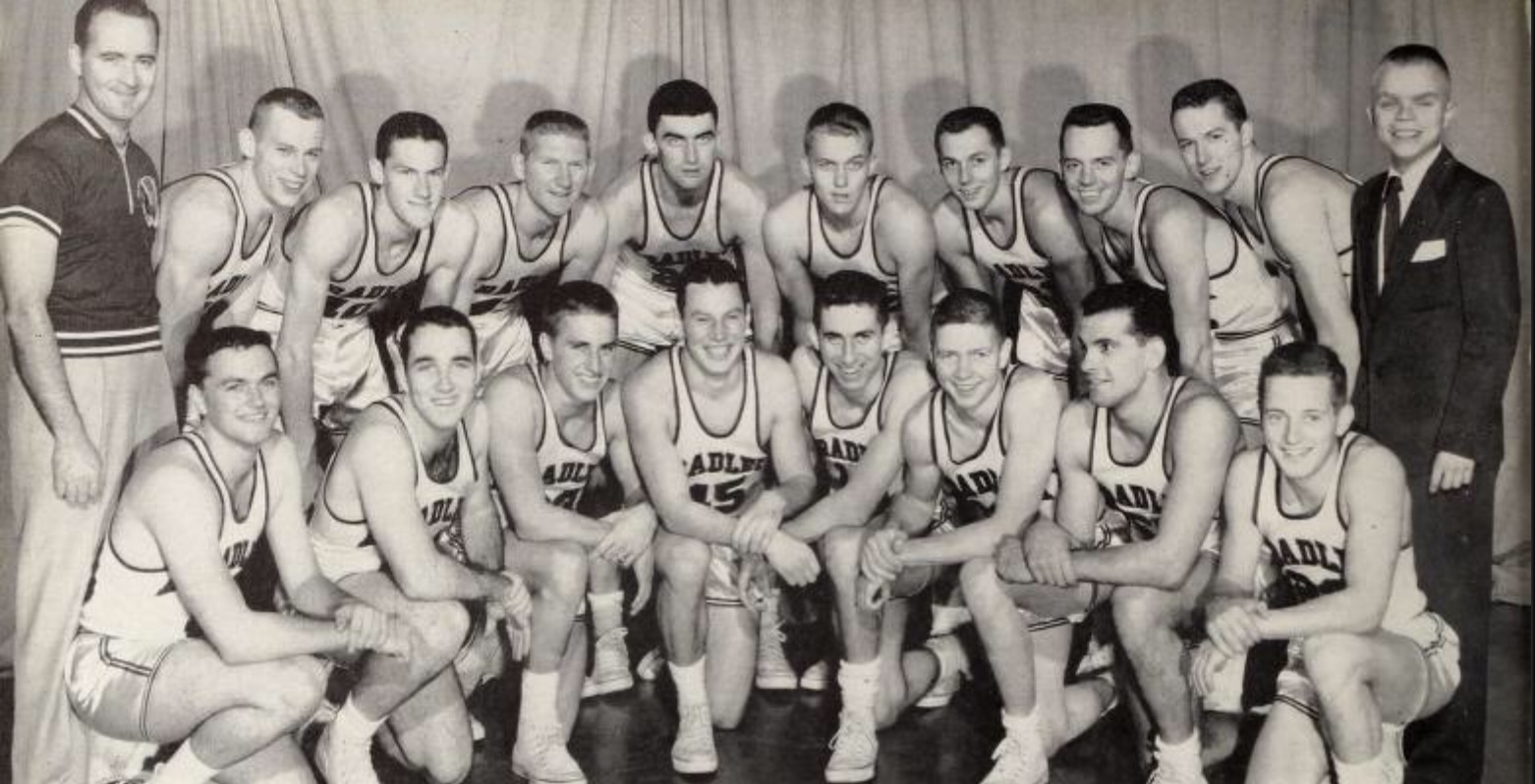

NCAA Tournament, Runner-up

National Championship Game, L 76-92 vs. La Salle
- Conference: Independent

Ranking
- AP: No. 7
- Record: 19–13
- Head coach: Forddy Anderson (6th season)
- Captains: Bob Carney; John Riley
- Home arena: Robertson Memorial Field House

1953–54 NCAA men's basketball independents standings
	Conf.				Overall
Team	W		L	PCT	W		L	PCT
No. 3 Holy Cross		–		–	26	–	2	.929
No. 17 Seattle		–		–	26	–	2	.929
No. 5 Duquesne		–		–	26	–	3	.897
No. 6 Notre Dame		–		–	22	–	3	.880
No. 2 La Salle		–		–	26	–	4	.867
Dayton		–		–	25	–	7	.781
Louisville		–		–	22	–	7	.759
No. 9 Penn State		–		–	18	–	6	.750
Oklahoma City		–		–	18	–	7	.720
Navy		–		–	18	–	8	.692
Army		–		–	15	–	7	.682
Villanova		–		–	20	–	11	.645
Lafayette		–		–	17	–	10	.630
Saint Joseph's		–		–	14	–	9	.609
Xavier		–		–	18	–	12	.600
No. 7 Bradley		–		–	19	–	13	.594
John Carroll		–		–	15	–	11	.577
Seton Hall		–		–	13	–	10	.565
Temple		–		–	15	–	12	.556
Muhlenberg		–		–	12	–	10	.545
Washington University		–		–	12	–	10	.545
Syracuse		–		–	10	–	9	.526
Cincinnati		–		–	11	–	10	.524
DePaul		–		–	11	–	10	.524
Iona		–		–	11	–	10	.524
Butler		–		–	13	–	12	.520
Boston College		–		–	11	–	11	.500
Loyola (Calif.)		–		–	14	–	16	.467
Rutgers		–		–	11	–	13	.458
Creighton		–		–	14	–	17	.452
Gonzaga		–		–	12	–	15	.444
Valparaiso		–		–	10	–	13	.435
Marquette		–		–	11	–	15	.423
Lehigh		–		–	8	–	12	.400
Pittsburgh		–		–	9	–	14	.391
Georgetown		–		–	11	–	18	.379
Siena		–		–	7	–	14	.333
Portland		–		–	9	–	19	.321
Loyola (IL)		–		–	7	–	15	.318
Drake		–		–	7	–	16	.304
Colgate		–		–	5	–	12	.294
Bucknell		–		–	4	–	16	.200
Rankings from AP Poll

The 1953–54 Bradley Braves men's basketball team represented Bradley University in college basketball during the 1953–54 season. The team finished the season with a 19–13 record and were national runners-up to La Salle University in the 1954 NCAA tournament. It was the second time in five seasons that Bradley was the national runner-up; in 1949–50, they lost to CCNY in both the NCAA and NIT championships.

== Schedule and results ==
Date time, TV	Rank^{#}	Opponent^{#}	Result	Record	Site city, state
Regular season
12/1/1953*		Illinois State	W 91–75	1–0	Robertson Memorial Field House; Peoria, IL
12/8/1953*		Purdue	L 73–77	1–1	Robertson Memorial Field House; Peoria, IL
12/11/1953*		at Pittsburgh; Steel Bowl tournament	L 64–66	1–2	Fitzgerald Field House; Pittsburgh, PA
12/12/1953*		vs. Wake Forest; Steel Bowl tournament	W 78–74	2–2	Fitzgerald Field House; Pittsburgh, PA
12/14/1953*		Alabama	L 61–63	2–3	Robertson Memorial Field House; Peoria, IL
12/21/1953*		USC	W 79–64	3–3	Robertson Memorial Field House; Peoria, IL
12/23/1953*		No. 19 Notre Dame	W 74–72	4–3	Robertson Memorial Field House; Peoria, IL
12/28/1953*		Arizona	W 79–53	5–3	Robertson Memorial Field House; Peoria, IL
12/30/1953*		Rutgers	W 89–70	6–3	Robertson Memorial Field House; Peoria, IL
1/2/1954*		No. 19 BYU	W 77–50	7–3	Robertson Memorial Field House; Peoria, IL
1/9/1954*		Iowa State	W 92–76	8–3	Robertson Memorial Field House; Peoria, IL
1/11/1954*		Drake	W 93–53	9–3	Robertson Memorial Field House; Peoria, IL
1/13/1954*		Saint Louis	W 76–59	10–3	Robertson Memorial Field House; Peoria, IL
1/16/1954*		at Louisville	L 86–95	10–4	Jefferson County Armory; Louisville, KY
1/18/1954*		Houston	W 86–71	11–4	Robertson Memorial Field House; Peoria, IL
2/1/1954*		at Arizona	L 74–87	11–5	Bear Down Gym; Tucson, AZ
2/3/1954*	No. 18	Tulsa	L 63–66	11–6	Expo Square Pavilion; Tulsa, OK
2/6/1954*	No. 18	at No. 14 Wichita State	L 83–91	11–7	Wichita, KS
2/9/1954*		DePaul	W 80–69	12–7	Robertson Memorial Field House; Peoria, IL
2/12/1954*		at Marquette	W 97–90	13–7	Old Gym; Milwaukee, WI
2/15/1954*		Louisville	L 90–96	13–8	Robertson Memorial Field House; Peoria, IL
2/20/1954*		at Drake	L 74–81	13–9	Drake Fieldhouse; Des Moines, IA
2/22/1954*		Illinois Wesleyan	W 87–72	14–9	Robertson Memorial Field House; Peoria, IL
2/27/1954*		at DePaul	L 76–80 ^{OT}	14–10	Chicago, IL
3/3/1954*		at Saint Louis	L 79–89	14–11	Kiel Auditorium; St. Louis, MO
3/6/1954*		Tulsa	W 90–69	15–11	Robertson Memorial Field House; Peoria, IL
3/8/1954*		Marquette	L 68–76	15–12	Robertson Memorial Field House; Peoria, IL
1954 NCAA Tournament
3/9/1954*		Oklahoma City; NCAA First Round	W 61–55	16–12	Robertson Memorial Field House; Peoria, IL
3/12/1954*		vs. Colorado; NCAA Quarterfinals	W 76–64	17–12	Gallagher-Iba Arena; Stillwater, OK
3/13/1954*		at No. 5 Oklahoma State; NCAA Quarterfinals	W 71–57	18–12	Gallagher-Iba Arena; Stillwater, OK
3/19/1954*		vs. USC; NCAA Final Four	W 74–72	19–12	Municipal Auditorium; Kansas City, MO
3/20/1954*		vs. No. 12 La Salle; NCAA National Championship	L 76–92	19–13	Municipal Auditorium; Kansas City, MO
*Non-conference game. ^{#}Rankings from AP Poll. (#) Tournament seedings in parentheses.
