= Elmer Gross =

American basketball player and coach

Biographical details
- Born: January 31, 1917; Homestead, Pennsylvania, U.S.
- Died: June 29, 2007 (aged 90); Chandler, Arizona, U.S.

Playing career
- 1940–1942: Penn State

Coaching career (HC unless noted)
- 1945–1950: Penn State (assistant)
- 1950–1954: Penn State

Accomplishments and honors

Championships
- 1954 Final Four

Elmer Gross (January 31, 1917 – June 29, 2007) was an American basketball player and coach.

Dr. Gross was a professor emeritus of physical education at Penn State and earned his bachelor's, master's and doctorate degrees from the university. He was a key figure as both a player and coach on Penn State's two basketball teams (1942 and 1954) to finish a season ranked in the nation's top 10 and was part of the Nittany Lions' first three NCAA tournament appearances.

== Coach ==
Gross coached Penn State for five seasons, from 1950 to 1954, posting an 80–40 record and a 66.7 winning percentage, tied for the best mark among Penn State coaches that served more than one season. He guided the Nittany Lions to a pair of NCAA tournament appearances. The first, in 1952, made him the first coach in the NCAA Tournament to have also appeared as a player. He capped his coaching career by guiding All-American Jesse Arnelle and the Nittany Lions to the 1954 Final Four. Penn State posted an upset of eighth-ranked LSU and ended Notre Dame's 18-game winning streak to advance to Kansas City where they eventually finished third after a loss to eventual champion LaSalle. Penn State rebounded to defeat Southern California and claimed the No. 9 ranking in the final Associated Press poll.

Gross took the reins of the Penn State program from his mentor, John Lawther, whom he played for and served under as a graduate assistant coach for five seasons. Known for the masterful use of his bench and a full-court press which vexed opponents, Gross also implemented an opportunistic fast-break offense which saw the Nittany Lions top 1,000 points for a season for the first time in 1950.

== Player ==
Also a standout player, Gross lettered three seasons for the Nittany Lion basketball team from 1940 to 1942. He was a captain and leading scorer for the 1942 team that was Penn State's first to reach the NCAA Tournament and finished with an 18–3 record and No. 10 national ranking in the final Dunkel Index.

== Professor ==
Upon his retirement from coaching in 1954, Gross earned his Doctor of Education degree and continued to teach at Penn State until his retirement as a full professor in 1978.

== Military service ==
Before beginning his coaching career, Gross was commissioned as a second lieutenant in the U.S. Army and served in France and Germany during World War II, participating in the Normandy landings at Omaha Beach. He was wounded in 1944 and awarded the Bronze Star and the Purple Heart for his actions in battle at Saint-Lô.

== Head coaching record ==
Statistics overview
Season	Team	Overall	Conference	Standing	Postseason
Penn State Nittany Lions (Independent) (1949–1954)
1949–50	Penn State	13–10			
1950–51	Penn State	14–9			
1951–52	Penn State	20–6			NCAA first round
1952–53	Penn State	15–9			
1953–54	Penn State	18–6			NCAA Third Place
Penn State:		80–40 (.667)			
Total:		80–40 (.667)			

== See also ==
- List of NCAA Division I Men's Final Four appearances by coach
