= Don Suman =

American basketball player and coach (1920–2015)

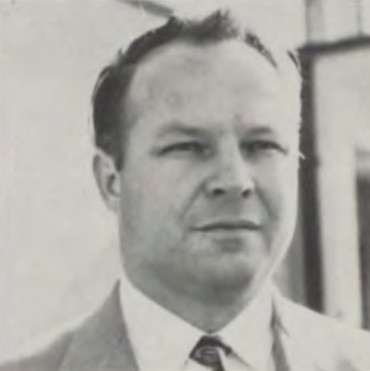

Biographical details
- Born: January 19, 1920; San Antonio, Texas, U.S.
- Died: February 5, 2015 (aged 95); Houston, Texas, U.S.

Playing career
- 1944–1945: Rice

Coaching career (HC unless noted)
- 1949–1959: Rice

Head coaching record
- Overall: 132–105 (.557)
- Tournaments: 1–1 (NCAA)

Accomplishments and honors

Championships
- SWC regular season (1954)

Donald W. Suman (January 19, 1920 – February 5, 2015) was a college basketball coach. He was the head coach of Rice from 1949 to 1959. He coached Rice to a 132–105 record, winning one Southwest Conference championship and making one NCAA tournament appearance. He also played college basketball and football as a student at Rice. After leaving his coaching position, he took a front office position under Bud Adams for the Houston Oilers. He was inducted into the Rice athletics Hall of Fame in 1987. He left Rice to become General Manager of the new Houston Oilers. In his first three seasons as GM the Oilers won the first two AFL championships. In his two seasons as GM the Oilers combined record was 20–7–1.

Suman died on February 5, 2015, in Houston.

== Head coaching record ==
Record table
Season	Team	Overall	Conference	Standing	Postseason
Rice Owls (Southwest Conference) (1949–1959)
1949–50	Rice	8–15	2–10	7th	
1950–51	Rice	8–15	2–10	7th	
1951–52	Rice	9–15	4–8	T–6th	
1952–53	Rice	15–6	8–4	T–2nd	
1953–54	Rice	23–5	9–3	T–1st	NCAA Regional Third Place
1954–55	Rice	10–12	6–6	5th	
1955–56	Rice	19–5	8–4	3rd	
1956–57	Rice	16–8	8–4	2nd	
1957–58	Rice	13–11	7–7	T–5th	
1958–59	Rice	11–13	5–9	7th	
Rice:		132–105 (.557)	59–65 (.476)		
Total:		132–105 (.557)			
National champion Postseason invitational champion Conference regular season champion Conference regular season and conference tournament champion Division regular season champion Division regular season and conference tournament champion Conference tournament champion
