= 1954 NCAA basketball championship game =

1954 NCAA Tournament Championship Game
National championship game
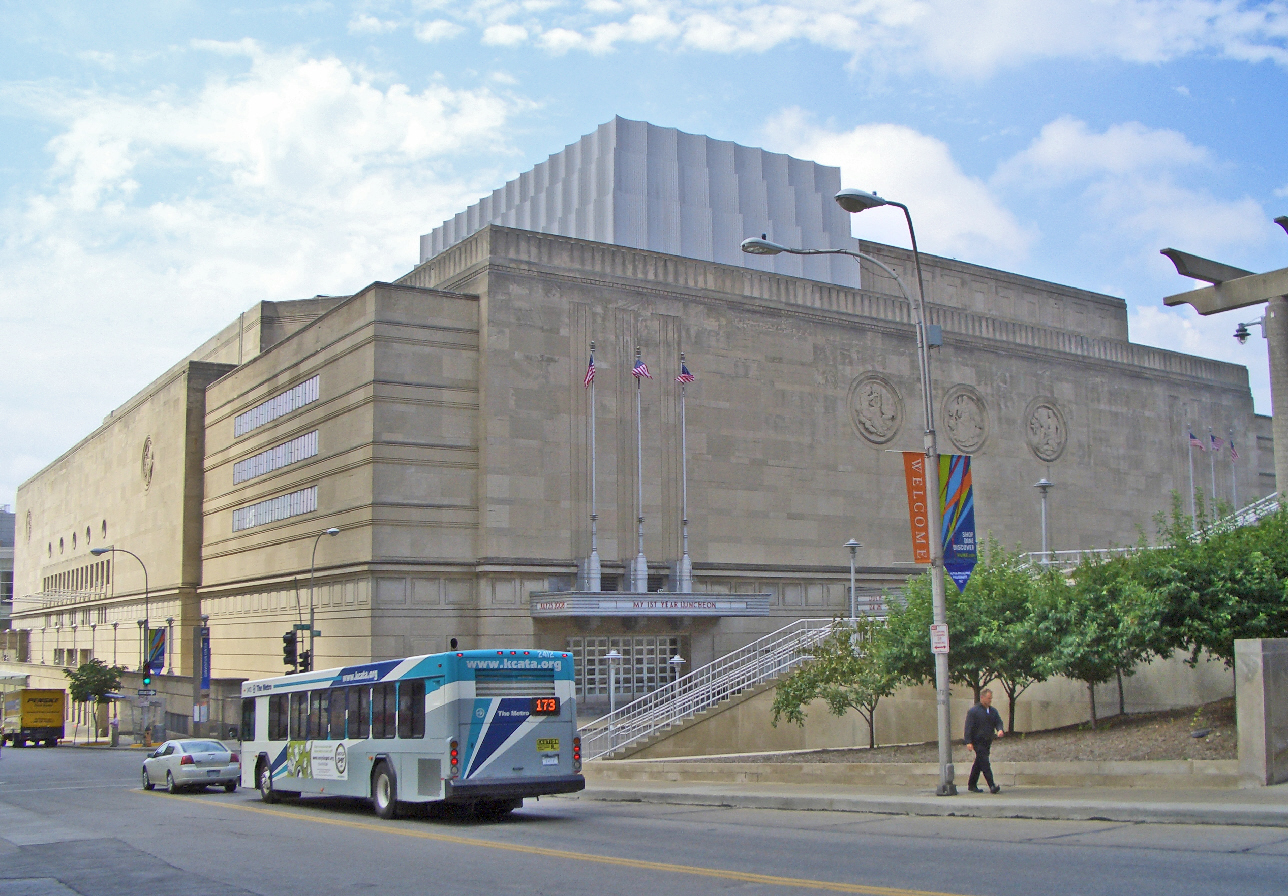
- The Municipal Auditorium in Kansas City, Missouri, hosted the championship game.
La Salle Explorers	Bradley Braves
Independent	Independent
(25-4)	(19-12)
92	76
Head coach: Ken Loeffler	Head coach: Forddy Anderson
- AP: 2
- AP: 7
	1st half	2nd half	Total
La Salle Explorers	42	50	92
Bradley Braves	43	33	76
- Date: March 20, 1954
- Venue: Municipal Auditorium, Kansas City, Missouri
- MVP: Tom Gola, La Salle

The 1954 NCAA University Division Basketball Championship Game was the finals of the 1954 NCAA basketball tournament and it determined the national champion for the 1953-54 NCAA men's basketball season. The game was played on March 20, 1954, at Municipal Auditorium in Kansas City, Missouri. It featured the independent Bradley Braves, and the independent La Salle Explorers.

== Participating teams ==
=== La Salle Explorers ===
- East-1
  - La Salle 76, Fordham 74
  - La Salle 88, NC State 81
  - La Salle 64, Navy 48
- Final Four
  - La Salle 69, Penn State 54

=== Bradley Braves ===
- West-1
  - Bradley 61, Oklahoma City 55
  - Bradley 76, Colorado 64
  - Bradley 71, Oklahoma A&M 57
- Final Four
  - Bradley 74, USC 72

== Game summary ==
March 20, 1954

#2 La Salle Explorers 92, #7 Bradley Braves 76
Scoring by half: 42-43, 50-33
Pts: Charles Singley 23; Rebs: Tom Gola 19	Pts: Bob Carney, Dick Estergard 17; Rebs: Dick Estergard 15

Municipal Auditorium, Kansas City, Missouri
