= La Salle Explorers men's basketball =

Men's college basketball program

La Salle Explorers Basketball
2026–27 La Salle Explorers men's basketball team
- University: La Salle University
- Head coach: Darris Nichols (2nd season)
- Location: Philadelphia, Pennsylvania
- Arena: John Glaser Arena (capacity: 3,000)
- Conference: Atlantic 10
- Nickname: Explorers
- Colors: Blue and gold
- Student section: Explorer Entourage (Formerly) Olney Outlaws (2024-Present)

NCAA Division I tournament champions
- 1954
Other NCAA Division I tournament results
Runner-up	1955
Final Four	1954, 1955
Elite Eight	1954, 1955
Sweet Sixteen	1954, 1955, 2013
Appearances	1954, 1955, 1968, 1975, 1978, 1980, 1983, 1988, 1989, 1990, 1992, 2013

NIT champions
- 1952

Conference tournament champions
- East Coast: 1975, 1978, 1980, 1983; MAAC: 1988, 1989, 1990, 1992

Conference regular-season champions
- 1968, 1974, 1975, 1978, 1983 (ECC); 1984, 1988, 1989 (MAAC)

Uniforms
Home	Away	Alternate

The La Salle Explorers men's basketball program represents La Salle University in college basketball. La Salle plays as a member of the Atlantic 10 Conference, having joined in 1995. The Explorers were NCAA national champions in 1954, with future Hall of Famer Tom Gola being named the tournament's most outstanding player. La Salle has appeared in the NCAA tournament 12 times, most recently in 2013.

== Rivalries ==
The Explorers, a member of the Big 5, have long-standing rivalries with multiple institutions including Temple University, University of Pennsylvania, Saint Joseph's University, and Villanova University. La Salle also has a rivalry with Drexel University who were previously a member of the now defunct City 6, and who were added to the Big 5 in 2023.

== History ==
The program has been rated the 53rd "Greatest College Basketball Program of All-Time" by Street & Smith's magazine and 71st by the ESPN College Basketball Encyclopedia.

La Salle has won one National Championship, one National Invitation Tournament Championship, and advanced to two Final Fours. The Explorers have also made 12 NCAA Tournament appearances, won eight Philadelphia Big 5 city championships, and four Metro Atlantic Athletic Conference Championships. The program is one of only two schools (with Houston) to have two players in the top 25 in all-time NCAA scoring – Lionel Simmons and Michael Brooks. It's also had three National Players of the Year.

== Brother Edward J. Sheehy, FSC, Ph.D., '68 ==
Brother Edward J. Sheehy, FSC, Ph.D., ’68 was a history faculty member, alumni, Christian Brother, and the chaplain for the men's basketball team from 1992-2022. La Salle is a Catholic university affiliated with the De La Salle Brothers. Brother Ed led the team in prayers before, during, and after games. Men's basketball coach Dr. John Giannini would spend 15 minutes talking to Brother Ed prior to games. On January 21, 2012, Brother Ed bobbleheads were distributed to the first 750 fans to attend the men's basketball game against Rhode Island. In 2013, Brother Ed was featured in a New York Times article while the men's basketball team advanced to the Sweet 16 round of the NCAA Tournament. Brother Ed died on December 22, 2022, at the age of 76.

== Coaches ==
Paul Westhead, who coached the Explorers from 1970-79, led the Los Angeles Lakers to the 1980 NBA championship. Westhead was hired in the summer of 1979 as an assistant to Jack McKinney, the former coach at Big 5 rival Saint Joseph's, then was promoted to head coach when McKinney suffered a near-fatal bicycling accident on November 8, 1979. Westhead remained with the Lakers until November 1981, when he was fired by Lakers owner Jerry Buss and succeeded by Pat Riley.

Previous head coach Dr. John Giannini previously coached at Rowan College, where he won the NCAA Division III national championship in 1996, and the University of Maine, where he left with the Black Bears' best winning percentage in school history.

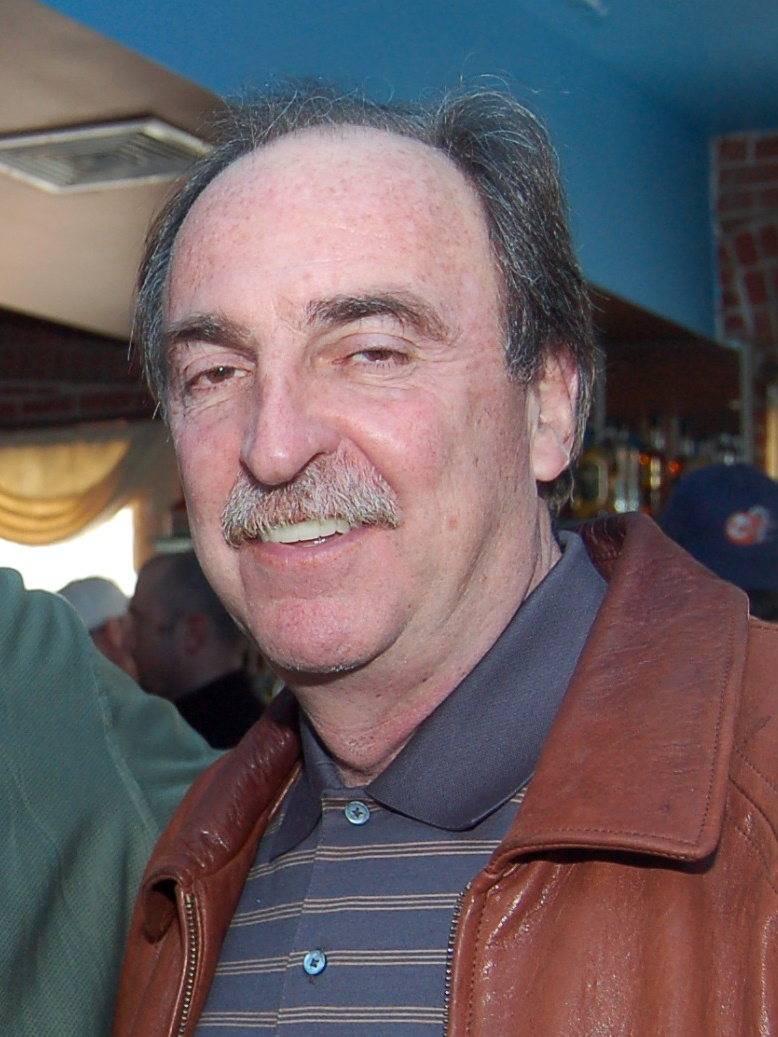
Fran Dunphy, the head men's basketball coach at La Salle from 2022–2025

On April 8, 2018, La Salle announced Ashley Howard as the next head coach of the Explorers. Howard previously served as an assistant coach under Jay Wright at Villanova University, where he helped led the Wildcats to two NCAA Division 1 basketball championships. After four losing seasons at La Salle, Howard was fired in March 2022.

On April 5, 2022, The Philadelphia Inquirer reported that La Salle would hire alum Fran Dunphy to be the Explorer's next men's basketball coach. After 3 seasons, Dunphy announced in February 2025 that he would retire from his head coaching role while staying with the school as special assistant to the Vice President of the university.

On March 11, 2025, La Salle announced the hiring of Radford head coach Darris Nichols as the new head coach.

== Postseason ==
=== NCAA tournament results ===
The Explorers have appeared in the NCAA tournament 12 times. Their combined record is 14–11. They were National Champions in 1954 and National Finalists in 1955.

Year	Seed	Round	Opponent	Result
1954		First round Sweet Sixteen; Elite Eight; Final Four; National Championship	Fordham; NC State; Navy; Penn State; Bradley	W 76–74^{OT} W 88–81; W 64–48; W 69–54; W 92–76
1955		First round Sweet Sixteen; Elite Eight; Final Four; National Championship	West Virginia; Princeton; Canisius; Iowa; San Francisco	W 95–61; W 73–46; W 99–64; W 73–76; L 63–77
1968		First round	Columbia	L 69–83
1975		First round	Syracuse	L 83–87^{OT}
1978		First round	Villanova	L 97–103
1980	No. 11	First round	No. 6 Purdue	L 82–90
1983	No. 12	Preliminary Round; First Round	No. 12 Boston University #5 VCU	W 70–58; L 67–76
1988	No. 13	First round	No. 4 Kansas State	L 53–66
1989	No. 9	First round	No. 8 Louisiana Tech	L 74–83
1990	No. 4	First round Second Round	No. 13 Southern Miss #5 Clemson	W 79–63; L 75–79
1992	No. 13	First round	No. 4 Seton Hall	L 76–78
2013	No. 13	First Four; Second Round; Third Round; Sweet Sixteen	No. 13 Boise State #4 Kansas State #12 Ole Miss #9 Wichita State	W 80–71; W 63–61; W 76–74; L 58–72

=== NIT results ===
The Explorers have appeared in the National Invitation Tournament (NIT) 12 times. Their combined record is 9–11. They were NIT champions in 1952, when the tournament was considered an elite event.

Year	Round	Opponent	Result
1948	Quarter-finals	WKU	L 61–68
1950	First round Quarterfinals	Arizona; Duquesne	W 72–66; L 47–49
1951	First round	Saint Louis	L 61–73
1952	First round Quarterfinals; Semi-finals; Finals	Seton Hall; St. John's; Duquesne; Dayton	W 80–76; W 51–45; W 59–46; W 75–64
1953	Quarter-finals	St. John's	L 74–75
1963	First round	Saint Louis	L 61–63
1965	First round	Detroit	L 86–93
1971	First round	Georgia Tech	L 67–70
1984	First round	Pittsburgh	L 91–95
1987	First round Second Round; Quarterfinals; Semi-finals; Finals	Villanova; Niagara; Illinois State; Arkansas–Little Rock; Southern Miss	W 86–84; W 89–81; W 70–50; W 92–73; L 80–84
1991	First round	Massachusetts	L 90–93
2012	First round	Minnesota	L 61–70

== Explorers in the NBA ==
La Salle has an extensive history of players who played professional basketball, including:

- Michael Brooks, 1980 College Player of the Year
- Joe Bryant, father of former pro Kobe Bryant
- Rasual Butler
- Larry Cannon
- Ken Durrett
- Bobby Fields
- Larry Foust, eight-time NBA All-Star selection
- Tom Gola, Naismith Hall of Fame, 1955 College Player of the Year
- B. J. Johnson
- Tim Legler, current basketball analyst for ESPN, 4th all-time in NBA three-point shooting percentage
- Ralph Lewis
- Gary Neal
- Doug Overton
- Jim Phelan
- Lionel Simmons, 1990 College Player of the Year
- Steven Smith
- Fatty Taylor
- Randy Woods
- Bernie Williams

== Explorers in international leagues ==
- Stephen Zack (born 1992), basketball player for Hapoel Holon in the Israeli Basketball Premier League

== Retired numbers ==
La Salle has retired five jersey numbers:

La Salle Explorers retired numbers
No.	Player	Pos.	Career
15	Tom Gola	SF/G	1951–1955
22	Lionel Simmons	SF	1986–1990
20	Larry Cannon	G	1966–1969
32	Michael Brooks	PF	1976–1980
33	Ken Durrett	PF	1968–1971

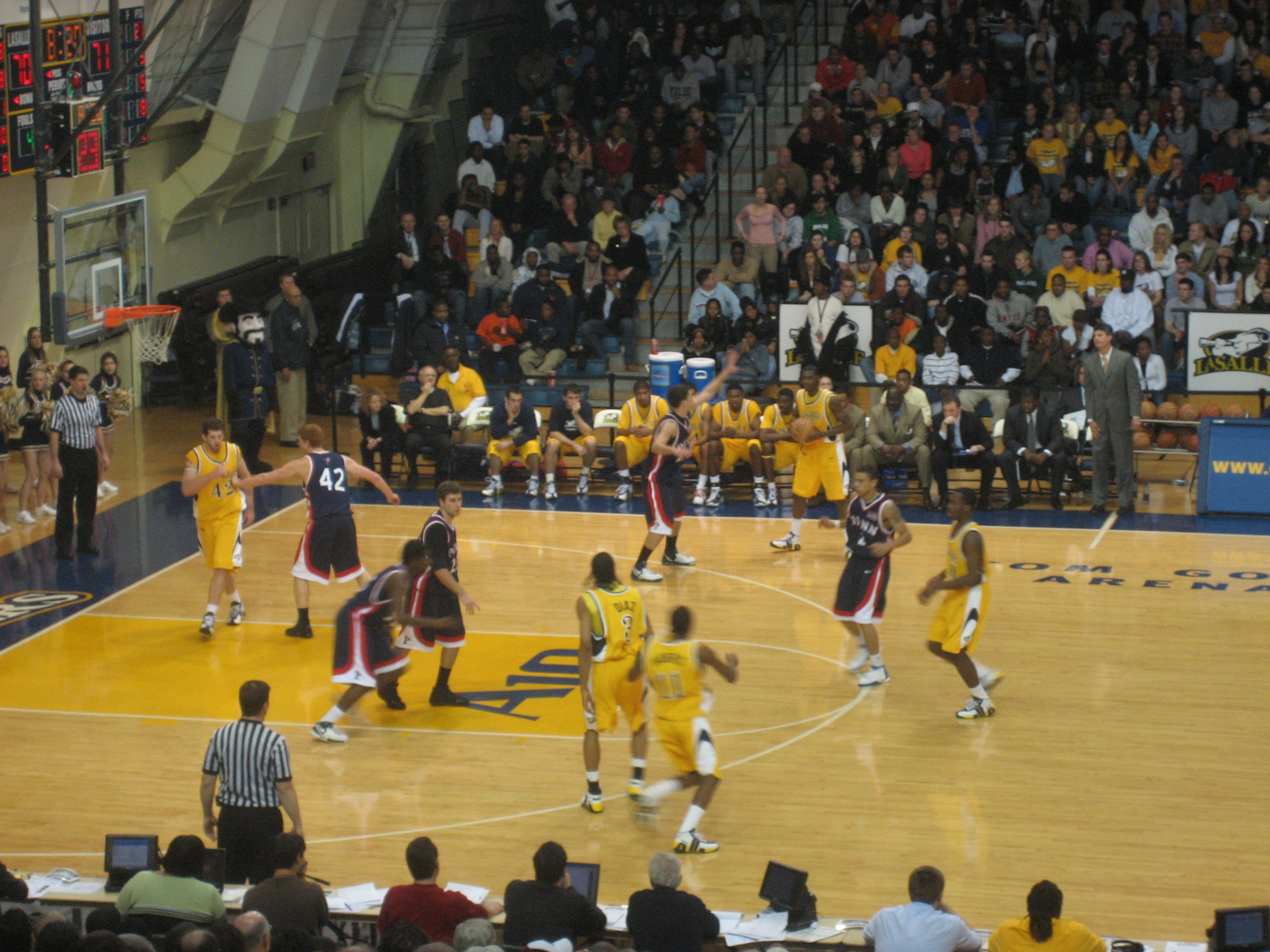
La Salle Explorers vs. Penn Quakers at Tom Gola Arena.

== Year-by-Year Records ==
La Salle has held membership in five conferences throughout its existence. After being an independent for several years they officially joined the Middle Atlantic Conference in 1958, before the larger schools in the conference created the East Coast Conference in 1974. In 1983 the team switched to the Metro Atlantic Athletic Conference (MAAC), staying until joining the Midwestern Collegiate Conference (now known as the Horizon League) in 1992. In 1995 the team joined fellow Philadelphia Big 5 teams Temple and Saint Joseph's in the Atlantic 10 Conference.

Season	Record	Conference Record	Postseason
1931–32	15–8		
1932–33	13–3		
1933–34	14–3		
1934–35	15–6		
1935–36	4–13		
1936–37	12–7		
1937–38	13–6		
1938–39	13–6		
1939–40	12–8		
1940–41	11–8		
1941–42	12–11		
1942–43	13–10		
1943–44	8–8		
1944–45	11–8		
1945–46	9–14		
1946–47	20–6		
1947–48	20–4		NIT
1948–49	11–8		Cincinnati Invitational Tournament
1949–50	21–4		NIT
1950–51	22–7		NIT
1951–52	25–7		NIT champion
1952–53	25–3		NIT
1953–54	26–4		NCAA champion
1954–55	26–5		NCAA finalist
1955–56	15–10		
1956–57	17–9		
1957–58	16–9		
1958–59	16–7	5–2	
1959–60	16–6	6–1	
1960–61	15–7	7–2	
1961–62	16–9	5–3	
1962–63	16–8	7–1	NIT
1963–64	16–9	5–1	
1964–65	15–8	4–1	NIT
1965–66	10–15	3–2	
1966–67	14–12	2–3	
1967–68	20–8	8–0	NCAA tournament
1968–69	23–1	7–0	*Suspended from Postseason
1969–70	14–12	3–2	
1970–71	20–7	5–1	NIT
1971–72	6–19	2–4	
1972–73	15–10	3–3	
1973–74	18–10	5–1	
1974–75	22–7	5–1	NCAA tournament
1975–76	11–15	1–4	
1976–77	17–12	3–2	
1977–78	18–12	5–0	NCAA tournament
1978–79	15–13	10–3	
1979–80	22–9	7–4	NCAA tournament
1980–81	14–13	8–3	
1981–82	16–13	7–4	
1982–83	18–14	7–2	NCAA tournament
1983–84	20–11	11–3	NIT
1984–85	15–13	8–6	
1985–86	14–14	8–6	
1986–87	20–13	10–4	NIT Finalist
1987–88	24–10	14–0	NCAA tournament
1988–89	26–6	13–1	NCAA tournament
1989–90	30–2	16–0	NCAA tournament
1990–91	19–10	12–4	NIT
1991–92	20–11	12–4	NCAA tournament
1992–93	14–13	9–5	
1993–94	11–16	4–6	
1994–95	13–14	7–7	
1995–96	6–24	3–13	
1996–97	10–17	5–11	
1997–98	9–18	5–11	
1998–99	13–15	8–8	
1999-00	11–17	5–11	
2000–01	12–17	5–11	
2001–02	15–17	6–10	
2002–03	13–16	6–10	
2003–04	10–20	5–11	
2004–05	10–19	5–11	
2005–06	18–10	10–6	
2006–07	10–20	3–13	
2007–08	15–17	8–8	
2008–09	18–13	9–7	
2009–10	12–18	4–12	
2010–11	14–16	6–10	
2011–12	21–12	9–7	NIT
2012–13	23–9	11–5	NCAA round of 16
2013–14	15–16	7–9	
2014–15	17–16	8–10	
2015–16	9–22	4–14	
2016–17	15–15	9–9	
2017–18	13–19	7–11	
2018–19	10–21	8–10	
2019–20	15–15	6–12	
2020–21	9–16	6–11	
2021–22	11–19	5–13	
2022–23	15–19	7–11	
2023–24	16–17	6–12	
2024–25	14–19	5–13	
