= 1954 NCAA basketball tournament =

Edition of USA college basketball tournament

- Season: 1953–54
- Teams: 24
- Finals site: Municipal Auditorium, Kansas City, Missouri
- Champions: La Salle Explorers (1st title, 1st title game, 1st Final Four)
- Runner-up: Bradley Braves (2nd title game, 2nd Final Four)
- Semifinalists: Penn State Nittany Lions (1st Final Four); USC Trojans (2nd Final Four)
- Winning coach: Ken Loeffler (1st title)
- MOP: Tom Gola (La Salle)
- Attendance: 115,391
- Top scorer: Tom Gola (La Salle) (114 points)

The 1954 NCAA basketball tournament involved 24 schools playing in single-elimination play to determine the national champion of men's NCAA Division I college basketball. The 16th annual edition of the tournament began on March 8, and ended with the championship game on March 20, at the Municipal Auditorium in Kansas City, Missouri. A total of 28 games were played, including a third-place game in each region and a national third-place game.

La Salle, coached by Ken Loeffler, won the national title with a 92–76 victory in the final game over Bradley, coached by Forddy Anderson. Tom Gola of La Salle was named the tournament's Most Outstanding Player.

Of note, Kentucky, the top-ranked team in the nation (with a record of 25–0) did not participate in any post-season tournament. Since several key players had technically graduated the year before (when Kentucky was banned from playing a competitive schedule due to the point-shaving scandal a few years earlier), those players were ruled ineligible for the NCAA tournament. Despite the wishes of the players, Adolph Rupp ultimately decided his team would not play.

LSU represented the Southeastern Conference in the tournament, its last appearance until 1979, well after the graduation of NCAA all-time leading scorer Pete Maravich. LSU made only one postseason appearance over the next 24 seasons, the 1970 National Invitation Tournament, during Maravich's senior season.

== Locations ==
The following are the sites selected to host each round of the 1954 tournament:

=== East-1 Region ===
First round (March 8)
Buffalo Memorial Auditorium, Buffalo, New York (Hosts: Canisius College, Niagara University)
Duke Indoor Stadium, Durham, North Carolina (Host: Duke University)

East-1 Regional (March 12 and 13)
The Palestra, Philadelphia, Pennsylvania (Hosts: University of Pennsylvania, Ivy League)

=== East-2 Region ===
First round (March 9)
Allen County War Memorial Coliseum, Fort Wayne, Indiana (Host: Big Ten Conference)

East-2 Regional (March 12 and 13)
Iowa Field House, Iowa City, Iowa (Host: University of Iowa)

=== West-1 Region ===
First round (March 8)
Robertson Memorial Field House, Peoria, Illinois (Host: Bradley University)

West-1 Regional (March 12 and 13)
Gallagher Hall, Stillwater, Oklahoma (Host: Oklahoma A&M University)

=== West-2 Region ===
First round (March 9) and West-2 Regional (March 12 and 13)
Oregon State Coliseum, Corvallis, Oregon (Host: Oregon State University)

=== Final Four ===
March 19 and 20
Municipal Auditorium, Kansas City, Missouri (Host: Missouri Valley Conference)

== Teams ==
| Region | Team | Coach | Conference | Finished | Final Opponent | Score |
East
| East | Connecticut | Hugh Greer | Yankee | First round | Navy | L 85–80 |
| East | Cornell | Royner Greene | Ivy League | Regional Fourth Place | NC State | L 65–54 |
| East | Fordham | Johnny Bach | Metro NY | First round | La Salle | L 76–74 |
| East | George Washington | Bill Reinhart | Southern | First round | NC State | L 75–73 |
| East | Indiana | Branch McCracken | Big Ten | Regional third place | LSU | W 73–62 |
| East | La Salle | Ken Loeffler | Independent | Champion | Bradley | W 92–76 |
| East | LSU | Harry Rabenhorst | Southeastern | Regional Fourth Place | Indiana | L 73–62 |
| East | Loyola (LA) | Jim McCafferty | Independent | First round | Notre Dame | L 80–70 |
| East | Navy | Ben Carnevale | Independent | Elite Eight | La Salle | L 64–48 |
| East | NC State | Everett Case | Atlantic Coast | Regional third place | Cornell | W 65–54 |
| East | Notre Dame | John Jordan | Independent | Elite Eight | Penn State | L 71–63 |
| East | Penn State | Elmer Gross | Independent | National Third Place | USC | W 70–61 |
| East | Toledo | Jerry Bush | Mid-American | First round | Penn State | L 62–50 |
West
| West | Bradley | Forddy Anderson | Independent | Runner Up | La Salle | L 92–76 |
| West | Colorado | Bebe Lee | Big 7 | Regional Fourth Place | Rice | L 78–55 |
| West | Colorado A&M | Bill Strannigan | Mountain States | Regional Fourth Place | Idaho State | L 62–57 |
| West | Idaho State | Steve Belko | Independent | Regional third place | Colorado A&M | W 62–57 |
| West | Oklahoma City | Doyle Parrack | Independent | First round | Bradley | L 61–55 |
| West | Oklahoma A&M | Henry Iba | Missouri Valley | Elite Eight | Bradley | L 71–57 |
| West | Rice | Don Suman | Southwest | Regional third place | Colorado | W 78–55 |
| West | Santa Clara | Bob Feerick | CBA | Elite Eight | USC | L 66–65 |
| West | Seattle | Al Brightman | Independent | First round | Idaho State | L 77–75 |
| West | USC | Forrest Twogood | Pacific Coast | National Fourth Place | Penn State | L 70–61 |
| West | Texas Tech | Polk Robison | Border | First round | Santa Clara | L 73–64 |

== Bracket ==
* – Denotes overtime period

=== East-1 Region ===
Quarterfinals
Navy | 85
Connecticut | 80
NC State | 75
George Washington | 73
La Salle | 76
Fordham | 74*

Semifinals
Cornell | 67
Navy | 69
NC State | 81
La Salle | 88

Finals
Navy | 48
La Salle | 64
Third place
NC State | 65
Cornell | 54

=== East-2 Region ===
Quarterfinals
Penn State | 62
Toledo | 50
Notre Dame | 80
Loyola (LA) | 70

Semifinals
LSU | 70
Penn State | 78
Indiana | 64
Notre Dame | 65

Finals
Penn State | 71
Notre Dame | 63
Third place
Indiana | 73
LSU | 62

=== West-1 Region ===
Quarterfinals
Bradley | 61
Oklahoma City | 55

Semifinals
Colorado | 64
Bradley | 76
Oklahoma A&M | 51
Rice | 45

Finals
Bradley | 71
Oklahoma A&M | 57
Third place
Rice | 78
Colorado | 55

=== West-2 Region ===
Quarterfinals
Idaho State | 77
Seattle | 75*
Santa Clara | 73
Texas Tech | 64

Semifinals
USC | 73
Idaho State | 59
Colorado A&M | 50
Santa Clara | 73

Finals
USC | 66
Santa Clara | 65**
Third place
Idaho State | 62
Colorado A&M | 57

=== Final Four ===
National semifinal
Penn State | 54
La Salle | 69
Bradley | 74
USC | 72

National Championship
La Salle | 92
Bradley | 76
National third-place game
USC | 61
Penn State | 70

== See also ==
- 1954 National Invitation Tournament
- 1954 NAIA Basketball Tournament
