= 1939–40 NCAA men's basketball season =

Men's collegiate basketball season

- NCAA Tournament: 1940
- Tournament dates: March 20 – 30, 1940
- National Championship: Municipal Auditorium; Kansas City, Missouri
- NCAA Champions: Indiana Hoosiers
- Helms National Champions: USC Trojans (retroactive selection in 1943)
- Other champions: Colorado Buffaloes (NIT)
- Player of the Year (Helms): George Glamack, North Carolina Tar Heels (retroactive selection in 1944)

The 1939–40 NCAA men's basketball season began in December 1939, progressed through the regular season and conference tournaments, and concluded with the 1940 NCAA basketball tournament Championship Game on March 30, 1940, at Municipal Auditorium in Kansas City, Missouri. The Indiana Hoosiers won their first NCAA national championship with a 60–42 victory over the Kansas Jayhawks.

== Rule changes ==
After a foul, teams received the option of either taking a free throw or taking the ball at mid-court.

== Season headlines ==
- College basketball was televised for the first time when W2XBS broadcast a doubleheader played at Madison Square Garden in New York City on February 28, 1940. In the first game, Pittsburgh defeated Fordham 50–37, and in the second game New York University defeated Georgetown 50–27.
- Duquesne became the first school to play in both the National Invitation Tournament and the NCAA tournament. The Dukes finished as runner-up in the NIT and lost in the semifinals of the NCAA tournament.
- In its second year, the NCAA tournament turned a profit (of $9,500) for the first time.
- In February 1943, the Helms Athletic Foundation retroactively selected USC as its national champion for the 1939–40 season.
- In 1995, the Premo-Porretta Power Poll retroactively selected Indiana as its top-ranked team for the 1939–40 season.

== Conference membership changes ==
School	Former conference	New conference
Carnegie Tech Tartans	Eastern Intercollegiate Conference	Non-major basketball program
Columbia Lions	Metropolitan New York Conference	See note
Georgetown Hoyas	Eastern Intercollegiate Conference	Independent
Grinnell Pioneers	Missouri Valley Conference	Non-major basketball program
Long Island Blackbirds	Metropolitan New York Conference	Independent
Pacific Tigers	Northern California Conference	Non-major basketball program
Penn State Nittany Lions	Eastern Intercollegiate Conference	Independent
Pittsburgh Panthers	Eastern Intercollegiate Conference	Independent
Saint Mary's (Calif.) Gaels	Northern California Conference	Independent
San Francisco Dons	Northern California Conference	Independent
San Jose State Spartans	Northern California Conference	Non-major basketball program
Santa Clara Broncos	Northern California Conference	Independent
Temple Owls	Eastern Intercollegiate Conference	Independent
West Virginia Mountaineers	Eastern Intercollegiate Conference	Independent

NOTE: Columbia left the Metropolitan New York Conference while retaining membership in the Eastern Intercollegiate Basketball League. It was a member of both from 1933 until 1939.

== Regular season ==
=== Conferences ===
==== Conference winners and tournaments ====
Conference	Regular season winner	Conference player of the year	Conference tournament	Tournament venue (City)	Tournament winner
Big Six Conference	Kansas, Missouri, & Oklahoma	None selected	No Tournament		
Big Ten Conference	Purdue	None selected	No Tournament		
Border Conference	New Mexico State	None selected	No Tournament		
Eastern Intercollegiate Basketball League	Dartmouth	None selected	No Tournament		
Metropolitan New York Conference	Did not play as conference				
Missouri Valley Conference	Oklahoma A&M	None selected	No Tournament		
Mountain States (Skyline) Conference	Colorado		No Tournament		
New England Conference	Rhode Island State		No Tournament		
Pacific Coast Conference	Oregon State (North); USC (South)		No Tournament; USC defeated Oregon State in best-of-three conference championship playoff series		
Southeastern Conference	Kentucky	None selected	1940 SEC men's basketball tournament	Alumni Memorial Gym (Knoxville, Tennessee)	Kentucky
Southern Conference	Duke	None selected	1940 Southern Conference men's basketball tournament	Thompson Gym (Raleigh, North Carolina)	North Carolina
Southwest Conference	Rice	None selected	No Tournament		

==== Conference standings ====
1939–40 Big Six Conference men's basketball standings
	Conf.				Overall
Team	W		L	PCT	W		L	PCT
Kansas	8	–	2	.800	19	–	6	.760
Missouri	8	–	2	.800	13	–	6	.684
Oklahoma	8	–	2	.800	12	–	7	.632
Iowa State	2	–	8	.200	9	–	9	.500
Kansas State	2	–	8	.200	6	–	12	.333
Nebraska	2	–	8	.200	6	–	12	.333

1939–40 Big Ten Conference men's basketball standings
	Conf.				Overall
Team	W		L	PCT	W		L	PCT
Purdue	10	–	2	.833	16	–	4	.800
Indiana	9	–	3	.750	20	–	3	.870
Ohio State	8	–	4	.667	13	–	7	.650
Illinois	7	–	5	.583	14	–	6	.700
Northwestern	7	–	5	.583	13	–	7	.650
Michigan	6	–	6	.500	13	–	7	.650
Minnesota	5	–	7	.417	12	–	8	.600
Iowa	4	–	8	.333	9	–	12	.429
Wisconsin	3	–	9	.250	5	–	15	.250
Chicago	1	–	11	.083	5	–	15	.250

1939–40 Border Conference men's basketball standings
	Conf.				Overall
Team	W		L	PCT	W		L	PCT
New Mexico A&M	12	–	4	.750	16	–	7	.696
Arizona	12	–	4	.750	15	–	10	.600
Texas State M&M	10	–	6	.625	15	–	11	.577
Arizona State–Flagstaff	7	–	9	.438	8	–	12	.400
Arizona State–Tempe	7	–	11	.389	8	–	13	.381
New Mexico	1	–	15	.063	3	–	22	.120

1939–40 Eastern Intercollegiate Basketball League standings
	Conf.				Overall
Team	W		L	PCT	W		L	PCT
Dartmouth	11	–	1	.917	15	–	6	.714
Princeton	8	–	4	.667	14	–	8	.636
Yale	7	–	5	.583	13	–	6	.684
Cornell	7	–	5	.583	10	–	13	.435
Columbia	4	–	8	.333	5	–	12	.294
Harvard	3	–	9	.250	5	–	14	.263
Penn	2	–	10	.167	5	–	13	.278

1939–40 Missouri Valley Conference men's basketball standings
	Conf.				Overall
Team	W		L	PCT	W		L	PCT
Oklahoma A&M	12	–	0	1.000	26	–	3	.897
Creighton	8	–	4	.667	11	–	9	.550
Drake	7	–	5	.583	13	–	12	.520
Washburn	6	–	6	.500	8	–	8	.500
Tulsa	5	–	7	.417	12	–	15	.444
Washington University	2	–	10	.167	7	–	13	.350
Saint Louis	2	–	10	.167	4	–	14	.222

1939–40 Mountain States Conference men's basketball standings
	Conf.				Overall
Team	W		L	PCT	W		L	PCT
Colorado	11	–	1	.917	17	–	4	.810
Utah	8	–	4	.667	19	–	4	.826
BYU	7	–	5	.583	17	–	8	.680
Utah State	7	–	5	.583	11	–	7	.611
Wyoming	3	–	9	.250	6	–	10	.375
Colorado State	3	–	9	.250	6	–	12	.333
Denver	3	–	9	.250	6	–	15	.286

1939–40 New England Conference men's basketball standings
	Conf.				Overall
Team	W		L	PCT	W		L	PCT
Rhode Island State	8	–	0	1.000	19	–	3	.864
Connecticut	6	–	2	.750	9	–	7	.563
New Hampshire	3	–	5	.375	5	–	10	.333
Northeastern	3	–	5	.375	4	–	13	.235
Maine	0	–	8	.000	3	–	9	.250

1939–40 Pacific Coast Conference men's basketball standings
	Conf.				Overall
Team	W		L	PCT	W		L	PCT
North
Oregon State	12	–	4	.750	27	–	11	.711
Oregon	10	–	6	.625	19	–	12	.613
Washington State	9	–	7	.563	23	–	10	.697
Washington	6	–	10	.375	10	–	15	.400
Idaho	3	–	13	.188	11	–	15	.423
South
USC †	10	–	2	.833	20	–	3	.870
Stanford	6	–	6	.500	14	–	9	.609
California	5	–	7	.417	15	–	17	.469
UCLA	3	–	9	.250	8	–	17	.320
† Conference playoff series winner

1939–40 Rocky Mountain Conference men's basketball standings
	Conf.				Overall
Team	W		L	PCT	W		L	PCT
Montana State	3	–	1	.750	10	–	16	.385
Colorado Mines	8	–	4	.667	10	–	10	.500
Colorado College	8	–	4	.667	10	–	11	.476
Colorado State–Greeley	5	–	5	.500	11	–	10	.524
Western State (CO)	1	–	11	.083	4	–	15	.211

1939–40 Southeastern Conference men's basketball standings
	Conf.				Overall
Team	W		L	PCT	W		L	PCT
Alabama	14	–	4	.778	18	–	5	.783
Tennessee	7	–	3	.700	14	–	7	.667
Georgia	9	–	4	.692	20	–	6	.769
LSU	8	–	4	.667	10	–	8	.556
Florida	5	–	4	.556	13	–	9	.591
Georgia Tech	6	–	6	.500	7	–	8	.467
Kentucky †	4	–	4	.500	15	–	6	.714
Auburn	6	–	7	.462	7	–	10	.412
Mississippi State	4	–	5	.444	9	–	6	.600
Vanderbilt	5	–	7	.417	10	–	12	.455
Ole Miss	3	–	8	.273	9	–	10	.474
Tulane	2	–	8	.200	2	–	13	.133
Sewanee	0	–	9	.000	2	–	13	.133
† Regular-season championship and SEC Tournament winner

1939–40 Southern Conference men's basketball standings
	Conf.				Overall
Team	W		L	PCT	W		L	PCT
Duke	13	–	2	.867	19	–	7	.731
North Carolina †	11	–	2	.846	23	–	3	.885
Washington and Lee	7	–	3	.700	13	–	5	.722
Wake Forest	10	–	5	.667	13	–	9	.591
Maryland	7	–	5	.583	14	–	9	.609
Clemson	9	–	7	.563	9	–	12	.429
Richmond	5	–	4	.556	11	–	6	.647
The Citadel	6	–	5	.545	8	–	9	.471
William & Mary	6	–	5	.545	12	–	11	.522
Furman	4	–	6	.400	11	–	11	.500
North Carolina State	5	–	10	.333	8	–	11	.421
Davidson	4	–	11	.267	8	–	13	.381
South Carolina	3	–	10	.231	5	–	13	.278
VMI	2	–	9	.182	3	–	12	.200
Virginia Tech	1	–	9	.100	4	–	15	.211
† Southern Conference Tournament winner

1939–40 Southwest Conference men's basketball standings
	Conf.				Overall
Team	W		L	PCT	W		L	PCT
Rice	10	–	2	.833	25	–	4	.862
Texas	8	–	4	.667	18	–	5	.783
Baylor	7	–	5	.583	12	–	9	.571
Arkansas	6	–	6	.500	12	–	10	.545
Texas A&M	5	–	7	.417	11	–	11	.500
SMU	5	–	7	.417	7	–	13	.350
TCU	1	–	11	.083	7	–	16	.304

=== Major independents ===
A total of 66 college teams played as major independents. Seton Hall (19–0) was undefeated, and Marshall (26–3) finished with the most wins.

1939–40 NCAA men's basketball independents standings
	Conf.				Overall
Team	W		L	PCT	W		L	PCT
Seton Hall		–		–	19	–	0	1.000
NYU		–		–	18	–	1	.947
Marshall		–		–	26	–	3	.897
Villanova		–		–	17	–	2	.895
Duquesne		–		–	20	–	3	.870
Santa Clara		–		–	17	–	3	.850
Indiana State		–		–	15	–	3	.833
LIU		–		–	19	–	4	.826
Toledo		–		–	24	–	6	.800
Western Kentucky State		–		–	24	–	6	.800
DePaul		–		–	22	–	6	.786
Bowling Green State		–		–	16	–	5	.762
Virginia		–		–	16	–	5	.762
Ohio		–		–	19	–	6	.760
St. John's		–		–	15	–	5	.750
Texas Tech		–		–	21	–	7	.750
Butler		–		–	17	–	6	.739
Army		–		–	11	–	4	.733
St. Francis (NY)		–		–	13	–	5	.722
Notre Dame		–		–	15	–	6	.714
Bradley		–		–	14	–	6	.700
Michigan State Normal		–		–	14	–	6	.700
Brown		–		–	13	–	6	.684
George Washington		–		–	13	–	6	.684
West Virginia		–		–	13	–	6	.684
Montana		–		–	17	–	8	.680
Colgate		–		–	12	–	6	.667
Miami (Ohio)		–		–	12	–	6	.667
St. Joseph's		–		–	10	–	5	.667
Penn State		–		–	15	–	8	.652
Bucknell		–		–	13	–	7	.650
St. Bonaventure		–		–	11	–	6	.647
Loyola (Md.)		–		–	14	–	8	.636
Niagara		–		–	12	–	7	.632
Siena		–		–	12	–	7	.632
Detroit		–		–	14	–	9	.609
Manhattan		–		–	14	–	9	.609
La Salle		–		–	12	–	8	.600
Fordham		–		–	11	–	8	.579
Lafayette		–		–	11	–	8	.579
Kent State		–		–	13	–	10	.565
Temple		–		–	13	–	10	.565
Syracuse		–		–	10	–	8	.556
Wichita Municipal		–		–	10	–	8	.556
Muhlenberg		–		–	11	–	9	.550
San Francisco		–		–	9	–	8	.529
Western State Teachers		–		–	10	–	9	.526
Brooklyn		–		–	9	–	9	.500
CCNY		–		–	8	–	8	.500
Canisius		–		–	8	–	9	.471
Cincinnati		–		–	8	–	9	.471
Pittsburgh		–		–	8	–	9	.471
Boston University		–		–	6	–	7	.462
Georgetown		–		–	8	–	10	.444
Marquette		–		–	7	–	9	.438
Holy Cross		–		–	2	–	3	.400
Montana State		–		–	10	–	16	.385
Saint Mary's		–		–	7	–	12	.368
Lehigh		–		–	5	–	10	.333
Valparaiso		–		–	6	–	14	.300
Loyola (Ill.)		–		–	5	–	14	.263
Rutgers		–		–	5	–	14	.263
Xavier		–		–	6	–	17	.261
Navy		–		–	3	–	11	.214
Dayton		–		–	4	–	17	.190
Louisville		–		–	1	–	18	.053

== Post-season tournaments ==
=== NCAA tournament ===
==== Semifinals & final ====
National Semifinals
Indiana	39
Duquesne	30
USC	42
Kansas	43

National Final
Indiana	60
Kansas	42

=== National Invitation tournament ===
==== Semifinals & finals ====
Semifinals
Colorado	52
DePaul	37
Oklahoma A&M	30
Duquesne	34

Finals
Colorado	51
Duquesne	40
Third place
DePaul	22
Oklahoma A&M	23

== Awards ==
=== Consensus All-American teams ===
Consensus First Team
Player	Class	Team
Gus Broberg	Junior	Dartmouth
John Dick	Senior	Oregon
George Glamack	Junior	North Carolina
Bill Hapac	Senior	Illinois
Ralph Vaughn	Senior	USC

Consensus Second Team
Player	Class	Team
Jack Harvey	Senior	Colorado
Marv Huffman	Senior	Indiana
Jimmy McNatt	Senior	Oklahoma
Jesse Renick	Senior	Oklahoma A&M

=== Major player of the year awards ===
- Helms Player of the Year: George Glamack, North Carolina (retroactive selection in 1944)

=== Other major awards ===
- NIT/Haggerty Award (Top player in New York City metro area): Ben Auerbach, NYU

== Coaching changes ==
A number of teams changed coaches during the season and after it ended.

Team	Former Coach	Interim Coach	New Coach	Reason
Arizona State-Flagstaff	Aaron McCreary		Frank Brickey	
The Citadel	Rock Norman		Ben Parkers	Norman left to coach Clemson.
Clemson	Joe Davis		Rock Norman	
Denver	Cac Hubbard		Ellison Ketchum	
DePaul	Tom Haggerty		Bill Wendt	
Louisville	Laurie Apitz		John Heldman Jr.	Apitz continued to be the football coach and athletic director.
NC State	Ray Sermon		Bob Warren	
Nebraska	William Browne		Adolph J. Lewandowski	
New Mexico	Roy W. Johnson		Benjamin Sacks	Johnson continued to be athletic director.
Saint Louis	Jack Sterrett		Bob Klenck	Sterrett left to coach Tulsa.
South Carolina	Ted Petoskey		Frank Johnson	Petoskey left to coach South Carolina's baseball team.
Tulsa	Tex Ryon		Jack Sterrett	
