= List of USC Trojans men's basketball seasons =

This is a list of seasons completed by the USC Trojans men's college basketball team.

== Seasons ==
Statistics overview
Season	Coach	Overall	Conference	Standing	Postseason
Emil Breitkrutz (Independent) (1906–1907)
1906–07	Emil Breitkrutz	6–5			
Emil Breitkrutz:		6–5			
No Coach (Independent) (1907–1910)
1907–08	No Coach	3–3			
1908–09	No Coach	8–3			
1909–10	No Coach	21–3			
J.S. Robson (Independent) (1910–1911)
1910–11	J.S. Robson	12–8			
J.S. Robson:		12–8			
Walter Hall (Independent) (1911–1912)
1911–12	Walter Hall	9–5			
Walter Hall:		9–5			
J.S. Robson (Independent) (1912–1913)
1912–13	J.S. Robson	13–2			
J.S. Robson:		13–2			
No Coach (Independent) (1913–1914)
1913–14	No Coach	5–7			
Ralph Glaze (Independent) (1914–1916)
1914–15	Ralph Glaze	3–6			
1915–16	Ralph Glaze	5–15			
Ralph Glaze:		8–21			
Motts Blair (Independent) (1916–1917)
1916–17	Motts Blair	8–12			
Motts Blair:		8–12			
Dean Cromwell (Independent) (1917–1918)
1917–18	Dean Cromwell	0–2			
Dean Cromwell:		0–2			
Motts Blair (Independent) (1918–1919)
1918–19	Motts Blair	3–8			
Motts Blair:		3–8			
Gus Henderson (Independent) (1919–1921)
1919–20	Gus Henderson	8–2			
1920–21	Gus Henderson	10–4			
Gus Henderson:		18–6			
Bill Hunter (Independent) (1921–1922)
1921–22	Bill Hunter	7–5	1–3	7th	
Bill Hunter:		7–5	1–3		
Les Turner (PCC) (1922–1927)
1922–23	Les Turner	5–12	2–6	3rd (South)	
1923–24	Les Turner	15–4	4–4	2nd (South)	
1924–25	Les Turner	14–4			
1925–26	Les Turner	4–8	0–6	3rd (South)	
1926–27	Les Turner	10–8	0–6	3rd (South)	
Les Turner:		48–36	6–22		
Leo Calland (PCC) (1927–1929)
1927–28	Leo Calland	22–4	6–3	T–1st (South)	
1928–29	Leo Calland	16–6	3–6	3rd (South)	
Leo Calland:		38–10	9–9		
Sam Barry (PCC) (1929–1941)
1929–30	Sam Barry	15–5	7–2	1st (South)	
1930–31	Sam Barry	8–8	5–4	2nd (South)	
1931–32	Sam Barry	10–12	8–3	T–1st (South)	
1932–33	Sam Barry	18–5	10–1	1st (South)	
1933–34	Sam Barry	16–8	9–3	1st (South)	
1934–35	Sam Barry	20–6	11–1	1st (South)	
1935–36	Sam Barry	14–12	8–4	T–1st (South)	
1936–37	Sam Barry	19–6	8–4	2nd (South)	
1937–38	Sam Barry	17–9	6–6	3rd (South)	
1938–39	Sam Barry	20–5	9–3	T–1st (South)	
1939–40	Sam Barry	20–3	10–2	1st (South)	Helms National Champion; NCAA Third Place
1940–41	Sam Barry	15–10	6–6	2nd (South)	
Sam Barry:		192–89	97–39		
Julie Bescos (PCC) (1941–1942)
1941–42	Julie Bescos	12–8	7–5	2nd (South)	
Julie Bescos:		12–8	7–5		
Ernie Holbrook (PCC) (1942–1944)
1942–43	Ernie Holbrook	23–5	7–1	1st (South)	
1943–44	Ernie Holbrook; Bobby Muth	8–12^{[Note A]}	1–5^{[Note A]}	3rd (South)	
Ernie Holbrook:		29–9	7–2		
Bobby Muth (PCC) (1944–1945)
1944–45	Bobby Muth	15–9	3–3	2nd (South)	
Bobby Muth:		17–17	4–7		
Sam Barry (PCC) (1945–1950)
1945–46	Sam Barry	14–7	8–4	2nd (South)	
1946–47	Sam Barry	10–14	2–10	4th (South)	
1947–48	Sam Barry	14–10	7–5	2nd (South)	
1948–49	Sam Barry	14–10	8–4	2nd (South)	
1949–50	Sam Barry	16–8	7–5	2nd (South)	
Sam Barry:		68–49	32–28		
Forrest Twogood (PCC/AAWU) (1950–1966)
1950–51	Forrest Twogood	21–6	8–4	T–1st (South)	
1951–52	Forrest Twogood	16–14	4–8	3rd (South)	
1952–53	Forrest Twogood	17–5	7–5	2nd (South)	
1953–54	Forrest Twogood	19–14	8–4	1st (South)	NCAA Fourth Place
1954–55	Forrest Twogood	14–11	5–7	3rd (South)	
1955–56	Forrest Twogood	14–12	9–7	5th	
1956–57	Forrest Twogood	16–12	9–7	4th	
1957–58	Forrest Twogood	12–13	8–8	5th	
1958–59	Forrest Twogood	15–11	8–8	5th	
1959–60	Forrest Twogood	16–11	9–7	3rd	NCAA University Division first round
1960–61	Forrest Twogood	21–8	9–3	1st	NCAA University Division Sweet Sixteen
1961–62	Forrest Twogood	14–11	5–7	3rd	
1962–63	Forrest Twogood	20–9	6–6	3rd	
1963–64	Forrest Twogood	10–16	6–9	4th	
1964–65	Forrest Twogood	14–12	8–6	3rd	
1965–66	Forrest Twogood	12–14	6–8	4th	
Forrest Twogood:		251–179	111–104		
Bob Boyd (Pac-8/Pac-10) (1966–1979)
1966–67	Bob Boyd	13–12	6–8	5th	
1967–68	Bob Boyd	18–8	11–3	2nd	
1968–69	Bob Boyd	15–11	8–6	3rd	
1969–70	Bob Boyd	18–8	9–5	2nd	
1970–71	Bob Boyd	24–2	12–2	2nd	
1971–72	Bob Boyd	16–10	9–5	3rd	
1972–73	Bob Boyd	18–10	9–5	2nd	NIT first round
1973–74	Bob Boyd	24–5	11–3	2nd	
1974–75	Bob Boyd	18–8	8–6	3rd	
1975–76	Bob Boyd	12–15	1–13	8th	
1976–77	Bob Boyd	6–20	2–12	8th	
1977–78	Bob Boyd	14–13	7–7	3rd	
1978–79	Bob Boyd	20–9	14–4	2nd	NCAA Division I second round
Bob Boyd:		216–131	107–79		
Stan Morrison (Pac-10) (1979–1986)
1979–80	Stan Morrison	12–15	5–13	7th	
1980–81	Stan Morrison	14–13	9–9	4th	
1981–82	Stan Morrison	19–9	13–5	3rd	NCAA Division I first round
1982–83	Stan Morrison	17–11	11–7	5th	
1983–84	Stan Morrison	11–20	6–12	8th	
1984–85	Stan Morrison	19–10	13–5	T–1st	NCAA Division I first round
1985–86	Stan Morrison	11–17	5–13	10th	
Stan Morrison:		103–95	62–64		
George Raveling (Pac-10) (1986–1994)
1986–87	George Raveling	9–19	4–14	10th	
1987–88	George Raveling	7–21	5–13	8th	
1988–89	George Raveling	10–22	2–16	10th	
1989–90	George Raveling	12–16	6–12	7th	
1990–91	George Raveling	19–10	10–8	3rd	NCAA Division I first round
1991–92	George Raveling	24–6	15–3	2nd	NCAA Division I second round
1992–93	George Raveling	18–12	9–9	5th	NIT Quarterfinal
1993–94	George Raveling	16–12	9–9	7th	NIT first round
George Raveling:		115–118	60–84		
Charlie Parker (Pac-10) (1994–1996)
1994–95	Charlie Parker	9–19	4–14	10th	
1995–96	Charlie Parker; Henry Bibby	13–17^{[Note B]}	4–14^{[Note B]}	9th	
Charlie Parker:		21–28	9–18		
Henry Bibby (Pac-10) (1996–2005)
1996–97	Henry Bibby	17–11	12–6	T–2nd	NCAA Division I first round
1997–98	Henry Bibby	9–19	5–13	8th	
1998–99	Henry Bibby	15–13	7–11	T–7th	NIT first round
1999–00	Henry Bibby	16–14	9–9	6th	
2000–01	Henry Bibby	24–10	11–7	4th	NCAA Division I Elite Eight
2001–02	Henry Bibby	22–10	12–6	T–2nd	NCAA Division I first round
2002–03	Henry Bibby	13–17	6–12	T–6th	
2003–04	Henry Bibby	13–15	8–10	6th	
2004–05	Henry Bibby; Jim Saia	12–17^{[Note C]}	5—13^{[Note C]}	10th	
Henry Bibby:		132–120	71–83		
Tim Floyd (Pac-10) (2005–2009)
2005–06	Tim Floyd	17–12	8–10	6th	
2006–07	Tim Floyd	25–12	11–7	T–3rd	NCAA Division I Sweet Sixteen
2007–08	Tim Floyd	21–12^{[Note D]}	11–7^{[Note D]}	T–3rd	NCAA Division I first round
2008–09	Tim Floyd	22–13	9–9	T–5th	NCAA Division I second round
Tim Floyd:		85–50^{[Note E]}	38–33^{[Note E]}		
Kevin O'Neill (Pac-10/Pac-12) (2009–2013)
2009–10	Kevin O'Neill	16–14	8–10	T–5th	
2010–11	Kevin O'Neill	19–15	10–8	T–4th	NCAA Division I First Four
2011–12	Kevin O'Neill	6–26	1–17	12th	
2012–13	Kevin O'Neill	14–18^{[Note F]}	9–9^{[Note F]}	T–6th	
Kevin O'Neill:		48–65	21–37		
Andy Enfield (Pac-12) (2013–2024)
2013–14	Andy Enfield	11–21	2–16	12th	
2014–15	Andy Enfield	12–20	3–15	12th	
2015–16	Andy Enfield	21–13	9–9	7th	NCAA Division I first round
2016–17	Andy Enfield	26–10	10–8	T–5th	NCAA Division I second round
2017–18	Andy Enfield	24–12	12–6	2nd	NIT second round
2018–19	Andy Enfield	16–17	8–10	8th	
2019–20	Andy Enfield	22–9	11–7	T–3rd	No postseason held
2020–21	Andy Enfield	25–8	15–5	2nd	NCAA Division I Elite Eight
2021–22	Andy Enfield	26–8	14–6	3rd	NCAA Division I first round
2022–23	Andy Enfield	22–11	14–6	3rd	NCAA Division I first round
2023–24	Andy Enfield	15–18	8–12	8th	
Andy Enfield:		205–129	70–76		
Eric Musselman (Big Ten) (2024–present)
2024–25	Eric Musselman	17–18	7–13	T–12th	CBC Quarterfinals
2025–26	Eric Musselman	18–14	7–13	T–12th	
Eric Musselman:		35–32	14–26		
Total:		1749–1281 (1,728–1,280)^{[Note G]}			
National champion Postseason invitational champion Conference regular season champion Conference regular season and conference tournament champion Division regular season champion Division regular season and conference tournament champion Conference tournament champion

^A. Bobby Muth replaced Ernie Holbrook midseason after going 6–4, 0–1 in conference. Muth finished season as interim coach, going 2–8 and 1–4 in conference.
^B. Charlie Parker fired midseason after going 12–9, 3–6 in conference. Henry Bibby finished season as interim coach, going 1–8 and 1–8 in conference.
^C. Henry Bibby fired midseason after going 2–2. Jim Saia finished season as interim coach, going 10–15 and 5–13 in conference.
^D. USC vacated all 21 of its wins, one loss, and its NCAA Tournament appearance for 2007–08 after O. J. Mayo was ruled ineligible. Official record is 0–11 (0–7 Pac–10) with no postseason participation.
^E. Official record is 64–50 (27–33 Pac-10).
^F. Kevin O'Neill fired midseason after going 7–10, 2–2 in conference. Bob Cantu finished season as interim coach, going 7–8 and 7–7 in conference.
^G. Official record reflecting 21 vacated wins and 1 vacated loss from 2007–08 season.
