= 1939–40 Georgia Bulldogs basketball team =

American college basketball season

1939–40 Georgia Bulldogs basketball
- Conference: Southeastern Conference
- Record: 20–5 (9–4 SEC)
- Head coach: Elmer A. Lampe (3rd season)
- Captain: Cecil Kelley
- Home arena: Woodruff Hall

1939–40 Southeastern Conference men's basketball standings
	Conf.				Overall
Team	W		L	PCT	W		L	PCT
Alabama	14	–	4	.778	18	–	5	.783
Tennessee	7	–	3	.700	14	–	7	.667
Georgia	9	–	4	.692	20	–	6	.769
LSU	8	–	4	.667	10	–	8	.556
Florida	5	–	4	.556	13	–	9	.591
Georgia Tech	6	–	6	.500	7	–	8	.467
Kentucky †	4	–	4	.500	15	–	6	.714
Auburn	6	–	7	.462	7	–	10	.412
Mississippi State	4	–	5	.444	9	–	6	.600
Vanderbilt	5	–	7	.417	10	–	12	.455
Ole Miss	3	–	8	.273	9	–	10	.474
Tulane	2	–	8	.200	2	–	13	.133
Sewanee	0	–	9	.000	2	–	13	.133
† Regular-season championship and SEC Tournament winner

The 1939–40 Georgia Bulldogs basketball team represented the University of Georgia as a member of the Southeastern Conference (SEC) during the 1939–40 NCAA men's basketball season. Led by third-year head coach Elmer A. Lampe, the Bulldogs compiled an overall record of 20–5 with a mark of 9–4 in conference play, placing third in the SEC. The team captain was Cecil Kelley.

== Schedule ==
Date time, TV	Opponent	Result	Record	Site city, state
12/20/1939	Buford Semi-Pro	W 50-29	1–0	Athens, GA
12/22/1939	Buford Semi-Pro	W 39-19	2–0	Athens, GA
1/2/1940	Mercer	W 51-41	3–0	Athens, GA
1/3/1940	Chattanooga	W 62-28	4–0	Athens, GA
1/5/1940	South Carolina	W 47-31	5–0	Athens, GA
1/6/1940	at Clemson	W 32-29	6–0	
1/9/1940	Sewanee	W 41-25	7–0	Athens, GA
1/10/1940	Albany	W 55-45	8–0	Athens, GA
1/12/1940	at Florida	L 36-45	8–1	
1/13/1940	at Florida	L 25-36	8–2	
1/16/1940	South Carolina	W 40-33	9–2	Athens, GA
1/19/1940	Ole Miss	W 45-41	10–2	Athens, GA
1/27/1940	at Georgia Tech	W 46-31	11–2	
2/1/1940	at Alabama	W 36-22	12–2	
2/3/1940	Auburn	W 32-28	13–2	Athens, GA
2/5/1940	at Alabama	L 21-33	13–3	
2/9/1940	at Auburn	W 48-47	14–3	
2/12/1940	Florida	W 46-36	15–3	Athens, GA
2/13/1940	Florida	W 54-37	16–3	Athens, GA
2/17/1940	Georgia Tech	W 40-31	17–3	Athens, GA
2/25/1940	Tennessee	L 41-48	17–4	Athens, GA
2/28/1940	Auburn	W 48-41	18–4	Athens, GA
2/29/1940	Ole Miss	W 45-28	19–4	Athens, GA
3/1/1940	Alabama	W 30-28	20–4	Athens, GA
3/2/1940	Kentucky	L 43-51	20–5	Athens, GA
*Non-conference game. (#) Tournament seedings in parentheses.
