= 1939–40 UCLA Bruins men's basketball team =

American college basketball season

1939–40 UCLA Bruins men's basketball
- Conference: Pacific Coast Conference
- South
- Record: 8–17 (3–9 PCC)
- Head coach: Wilbur Johns (1st season)
- Assistant coach: Don Ashen

1939–40 Pacific Coast Conference men's basketball standings
	Conf.				Overall
Team	W		L	PCT	W		L	PCT
North
Oregon State	12	–	4	.750	27	–	11	.711
Oregon	10	–	6	.625	19	–	12	.613
Washington State	9	–	7	.563	23	–	10	.697
Washington	6	–	10	.375	10	–	15	.400
Idaho	3	–	13	.188	11	–	15	.423
South
USC †	10	–	2	.833	20	–	3	.870
Stanford	6	–	6	.500	14	–	9	.609
California	5	–	7	.417	15	–	17	.469
UCLA	3	–	9	.250	8	–	17	.320
† Conference playoff series winner

The 1939–40 UCLA Bruins men's basketball team represented the University of California, Los Angeles during the 1939–40 NCAA men's basketball season and were members of the Pacific Coast Conference. The Bruins were led by first year head coach Wilbur Johns. They finished the regular season with a record of 8–17 and were fourth in the southern division with a record of 3–9.

== Previous season ==
The Bruins finished the regular season with a record of 7–20 and were fourth in the southern division with a record of 0–12. At the end of the season, Caddy Works stepped down as head coach and was replaced by long time assistant Wilbur Johns.

== Roster ==
1939–40 UCLA Bruins men's basketball team
Players
Coaches

Pos.	#	Name	Height	Weight	Year	Hometown
F		Lloyd Anderson	—	—
		Ray Bartlett	—	—
C		Sandy Cameron	—	—
		John Colla	—	—
G	15	Clark George	—	—
		Larry Gittler	—	—
F	6	Ernie Handlesman	—	—
C	20	Roger Hillis	—	—
F	23	Harley Humes	—	—
		Paul Klein	—	—
		Vic Millar	—	—
G	9	Bob Null	—	—
		Alex Rafalovich (C)	—	—
F	18	Jackie Robinson	—	—	Jr	Cairo, Georgia
C		Bill Ward	—	—

Head coach

Wilbur Johns (UCLA)

Assistant coach(es)

- Don Ashen (UCLA)

Legend

- (C) Team captain
- (S) Suspended
- (I) Ineligible
- (W) Walk-on
- Injured
- Current redshirt

Roster
Last update: 30 January 2018

== Schedule ==
Date time, TV	Rank^{#}	Opponent^{#}	Result	Record	Site city, state
Regular Season
*		at San Diego State	L 24–46	0–1	San Diego, CA
*		at San Diego State	W 31–28	1–1	San Diego, CA
*		Bank of America	W 39–38	2–1	Men's Gym; Los Angeles, CA
*		at Santa Clara	L 21–36	2–2	Santa Clara, CA
*		at San Jose State	W 46–33	3–2	Spartan Gym; San Jose, CA
*		at San Jose State	L 31–40	3–3	Spartan Gym; San Jose, CA
*		North American Aviation	L 39–42	3–4	Men's Gym; Los Angeles, CA
*		20th Century Fox	L 33–39	3–5	Men's Gym; Los Angeles, CA
*		UC Davis	W 34–32	4–5	Men's Gym; Los Angeles, CA
*		New Mexico State	L 28–29	4–6	Men's Gym; Los Angeles, CA
*		St. Mary's	W 34–33	5–6	Men's Gym; Los Angeles, CA
*		Loyola Marymount	L 36–40	5–7	Men's Gym; Los Angeles, CA
		at Stanford	L 38–53	5–8 (0–1)	Stanford Pavilion; Stanford, CA
		at Stanford	L 36–40	5–9 (0–2)	Stanford Pavilion; Stanford, CA
		USC	L 32–50	5–10 (0–3)	Men's Gym; Los Angeles, CA
*		Bank of America	L 29–51	5–11	Men's Gym; Los Angeles, CA
		at California	L 33–39	5–12 (0–4)	Men's Gym; Berkeley, CA
		at California	W 34–32	6–12 (1–4)	Men's Gym; Berkeley, CA
		at USC	L 26–60	6–13 (1–5)	Shrine Auditorium; Los Angeles, CA
		Stanford	L 42–51	6–14 (1–6)	Men's Gym; Los Angeles, CA
		Stanford	W 42–37 ^{OT}	7–14 (2–6)	Men's Gym; Los Angeles, CA
		California	L 26–48	7–15 (2–7)	Men's Gym; Los Angeles, CA
		California	W 35–33	8–15 (3–7)	Men's Gym; Los Angeles, CA
		USC	L 26–32	8–16 (3–8)	Men's Gym; Los Angeles, CA
		USC	L 35–47	8–17 (3–9)	Men's Gym; Los Angeles, CA
*Non-conference game. ^{#}Rankings from AP Poll. (#) Tournament seedings in parentheses. All times are in Pacific Time.
