= Forrest Twogood =

American baseball and basketball player (1907–1972)

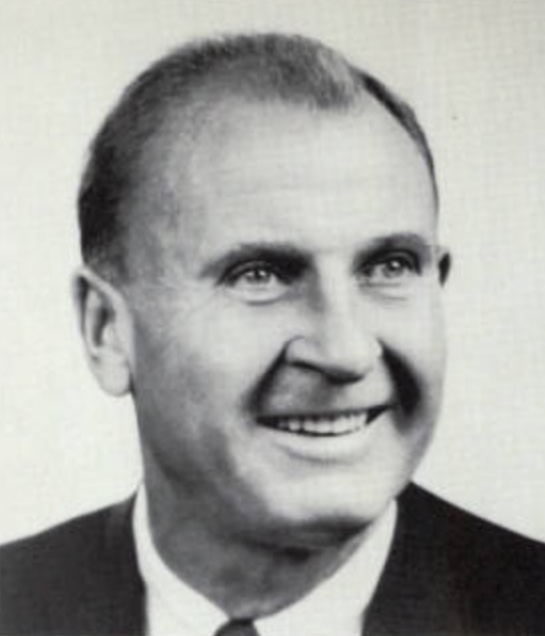
- Twogood from the 1962 El Rodeo

Biographical details
- Born: April 29, 1907; Kingsley, Iowa, U.S.
- Died: April 26, 1972 (aged 64); Glendale, California, U.S.

Playing career

Basketball
- 1926–1929: Iowa

Baseball
- c. 1929: Iowa
- 1929: Danville Veterans
- 1930: St. Joseph Saints
- 1930: Shawnee Robins
- 1932–1933: Toledo Mud Hens
- Position: Pitcher (baseball)

Coaching career (HC unless noted)

Basketball
- 1929–1936: USC (assistant)
- 1936–1941: Idaho
- 1941–1942: San Francisco
- 1949–1950: USC (assistant)
- 1950–1966: USC

Baseball
- 1937–1941: Idaho

Administrative career (AD unless noted)
- 1966–1972: USC (assistant AD)

Head coaching record
- Overall: 317–260 (basketball); 34–90 (baseball)
- Tournaments: 3–5 (NCAA University Division)

Accomplishments and honors

Championships
- NCAA Regional—Final Four (1954); PCC regular season (1954); AAWU regular season (1961)

Awards
- Helms Foundation Hall of Fame

Forrest Twogood
- Military career
- Allegiance: United States
- Branch: United States Navy
- Service years: 1942–1945
- Rank: Lieutenant Commander
- Unit: Training
- Conflicts: World War II

Forrest Floyd "Twogie" Twogood (April 29, 1907 – April 26, 1972) was a minor league baseball player, college basketball and baseball coach, and college athletics administrator. He is best known as the head basketball coach at the University of Southern California for 16 seasons, from 1950 to 1966.

Born in Kingsley, Iowa, Twogood was three-sport athlete at Central High School in Sioux City, then played basketball and baseball at the University of Iowa, before being signed in baseball by Branch Rickey's St. Louis Cardinals. A left-handed pitcher, he played four seasons of minor league baseball while spending his winters in Los Angeles as an assistant basketball coach at USC under Sam Barry, his coach at Iowa, from 1929 to 1936.

After arm trouble led to his retirement from baseball in 1934, Twogood was the basketball head coach at the University of Idaho in Moscow, Idaho from 1936 to 1941, (and also the Vandals' baseball coach (1937–41)), and the University of San Francisco for a season (1941–42).

During World War II, he served in the U.S. Navy, then worked in the private sector and also as supervisor of officials in the Pacific Coast Conference.

Twogood returned to USC as an assistant basketball coach under Barry in 1949, and when Barry died of a heart attack in September 1950, Twogood was promoted to head coach, and served for 16 seasons. In 22 seasons as a head coach, he compiled a 317–260 (.549) record, with two conference championships and three NCAA tournament appearances, including the Final Four in 1954. After stepping down from coaching in 1966, Twogood was an assistant athletic director at USC. The auditorium at the university's Heritage Hall is named in his honor; its bronze plaque reads:

"Athlete and coach, able administrator, dedicated sportsman, man of courage, honor and compassion, Forrest Twogood is synonymous with the athletic heritage of the University of Southern California. He served USC and intercollegiate athletics with brilliance and devotion. The university is proud to express its love and esteem for Twogie by designating this hall forever in his name."

Diagnosed with inoperable lymph gland cancer in late 1971, Twogood died in April 1972 at Glendale Memorial Hospital in the Los Angeles suburb of Glendale, a few days shy of his 65th birthday. He left behind his beloved wife Eleanor, sisters Blanche and Lucille, and several nieces and nephews Dick Evans and David Stockman, US Naval Academy 1951 Col (Ret) USAF and fighter pilot, and wife Lucia, as well as David and Lucia's children Sidne Ann and Bill Stockman, who loved him dearly

== Head coaching record ==
=== Basketball ===
Record table
Season	Team	Overall	Conference	Standing	Postseason
Idaho Vandals (Pacific Coast Conference) (1936–1941)
1936–37	Idaho	8–19	2–14	5th (N. Div.)	
1937–38	Idaho	24–11	12–8	T–3rd (N. Div.)	
1938–39	Idaho	12–19	1–15	5th (N. Div.)	
1939–40	Idaho	11–15	3–13	5th (N. Div.)	
1940–41	Idaho	14–15	4–12	5th (N. Div.)	
Idaho:		69–79 (.466)	22–62 (.262)		
San Francisco Dons (Independent) (1941–1942)
1941–42	San Francisco	14–10			
San Francisco:		14–10 (.583)			
USC Trojans (Pacific Coast Conference) (1950–1959)
1950–51	USC	21–6	8–4	T-1st (S. Div.)	
1951–52	USC	16–14	4–8	4th (S. Div.)	
1952–53	USC	17–5	7–5	2nd (S. Div.)	
1953–54	USC	19–14	8–4	1st	NCAA Final Four
1954–55	USC	14–11	5–7	3rd (S. Div.)	
1955–56	USC	14–12	9–7	5th	
1956–57	USC	16–12	9–7	4th	
1957–58	USC	12–13	8–8	5th	
1958–59	USC	15–11	6–6	5th	
USC Trojans (Athletic Association of Western Universities) (1959–1966)
1959–60	USC	16–11	5–7	3rd	NCAA first round
1960–61	USC	21–8	9–3	1st	NCAA Sweet 16
1961–62	USC	14–11	5–7	T–3rd	
1962–63	USC	20–9	6–6	T–3rd	
1963–64	USC	10–16	6–9	4th	
1964–65	USC	14–12	8–6	3rd	
1965–66	USC	13–13	6–8	T–4th	
USC:		252–178 (.586)	109–102 (.517)		
Total:		335–267 (.556)			
National champion Postseason invitational champion Conference regular season champion Conference regular season and conference tournament champion Division regular season champion Division regular season and conference tournament champion Conference tournament champion

== See also ==
- List of NCAA Division I Men's Final Four appearances by coach
