= 1940 SEC men's basketball tournament =

- Classification: Division I
- Season: 1939–40
- Teams: 12
- Site: Alumni Memorial Gym; Knoxville, Tennessee
- Champions: Kentucky (4th title)
- Winning coach: Adolph Rupp (4th title)

1939–40 Southeastern Conference men's basketball standings
| | Conf. | | | | Overall |
| Team | W | | L | PCT | W | | L | PCT |
|---|---|---|---|---|---|---|---|---|
| Alabama | 14 | – | 4 | .778 | 18 | – | 5 | .783 |
| Tennessee | 7 | – | 3 | .700 | 14 | – | 7 | .667 |
| Georgia | 9 | – | 4 | .692 | 20 | – | 6 | .769 |
| LSU | 8 | – | 4 | .667 | 10 | – | 8 | .556 |
| Florida | 5 | – | 4 | .556 | 13 | – | 9 | .591 |
| Georgia Tech | 6 | – | 6 | .500 | 7 | – | 8 | .467 |
| Kentucky † | 4 | – | 4 | .500 | 15 | – | 6 | .714 |
| Auburn | 6 | – | 7 | .462 | 7 | – | 10 | .412 |
| Mississippi State | 4 | – | 5 | .444 | 9 | – | 6 | .600 |
| Vanderbilt | 5 | – | 7 | .417 | 10 | – | 12 | .455 |
| Ole Miss | 3 | – | 8 | .273 | 9 | – | 10 | .474 |
| Tulane | 2 | – | 8 | .200 | 2 | – | 13 | .133 |
| Sewanee | 0 | – | 9 | .000 | 2 | – | 13 | .133 |
† Regular-season championship and SEC Tournament winner

The 1940 Southeastern Conference men's basketball tournament took place on February 28–March 2, 1940, in Knoxville, Tennessee at Alumni Memorial Gym. It was the seventh SEC basketball tournament.

Kentucky won the tournament by beating Georgia in the championship game.

== Bracket ==
First Round
LSU | 57
Tulane | 44
Georgia | 48
Auburn | 41
Vanderbilt | 46
Mississippi State | 36
Tennessee | 55
Georgia Tech | 43

Quarterfinals
Alabama | 51
LSU | 25
Ole Miss | 28
Georgia | 45
Kentucky | 44
Vanderbilt | 34
Florida | 32
Tennessee | 42

Semifinals
Alabama | 28
Georgia | 30
Kentucky | 30
Tennessee | 29

Finals
Georgia | 43
Kentucky | 51
