= USC Trojans men's basketball =

Sports team of the University of Southern California

2026–27 USC Trojans men's basketball team
- University: University of Southern California
- First season: 1906–07; 120 years ago
- Athletic director: Jennifer Cohen
- Head coach: Eric Musselman; 3rd season, 35–32 (.522)
- Location: Los Angeles, California
- Arena: Galen Center (capacity: 10,258)
- NCAA division: Division I
- Conference: Big Ten
- Nickname: Trojans
- Colors: Cardinal and gold
- All-time record: 1,764–1,299 (.576)
- NCAA tournament record: 17–23 (.425)

NCAA Division I tournament third place
- 1940
Other NCAA Division I tournament results
Final Four	1940, 1954
Elite Eight	1940, 1954, 2001, 2021
Sweet Sixteen	1954, 1961, 2001, 2007, 2021
Appearances	1940, 1954, 1960, 1961, 1979, 1982, 1985, 1991, 1992, 1997, 2001, 2002, 2007, 2008*, 2009, 2011, 2016, 2017, 2021, 2022, 2023

Pre-tournament Helms national champions
- 1939–40

Conference tournament champions
- Pac-12: 2009

Conference regular-season champions
- PCC: 1928, 1930, 1935, 1940, 1954 Pac-12: 1961, 1985

Conference division champions
- PCC South: 1928, 1930, 1932, 1933, 1934, 1935, 1936, 1939, 1940, 1943, 1951, 1954

Uniforms
Home	Away
Alternate	Alternate
- * vacated by the NCAA

The USC Trojans men's basketball program is a college basketball team that competes in the Big Ten Conference of the National Collegiate Athletic Association (NCAA) Division I, representing the University of Southern California. Following the end of the 2023–2024 academic calendar, Pac-12 schools Oregon, UCLA, USC and Washington joined the Big Ten conference.

Eric Musselman is the current head coach of the USC program. He succeeded Andy Enfield, who coached the team from 2013–2024.

== History ==
The USC Trojans have an all-time record of 1,500–1,097 (.578) in intercollegiate basketball games. They boast 25 All-Americans, 14 league championships, one conference tournament title, 16 NCAA tournament appearances, five Sweet Sixteen appearances, four Elite Eight appearances, and two Final Four appearances. Sam Barry and four of his USC players (Jack Gardner, Alex Hannum, Tex Winter and Bill Sharman) have been inducted into the Naismith Memorial Basketball Hall of Fame as coaches. (Sharman was also inducted as a player.)

=== The early years (1906–28) ===
On December 7, 1906 the Los Angeles Herald reported: "Basketball Is Started At U.S.C." The first official game of USC basketball was an interclass drubbing by the freshman over the sophomores, 25–2. USC would later host its debut intercollegiate basketball game, the first of its kind in Southern California, on January 16, 1907 with an 18–15 win over Occidental College.

After a standout season in 1910, when USC placed second in the league, the Methodists (as they had been known at the time) slowly grew the program under the direction of a series of player-managers and part-time coaches. Several football headmen served as basketball coaches during that time, including Ralph Glaze, Dean Cromwell, Elmer "Gloomy Gus" Henderson, and Leo Calland. In addition, USC's basketball team was often littered with football standouts such as USC Athletic Hall of Famers Morley Drury and Jess Mortensen.

In 1922 USC joined the Pacific Coast Conference. The Trojans then won their first conference title in 1928 under Calland's leadership, edging past the Washington Huskies in the second and final game of the conference championship series. With a see-sawing score for most of the game, Charley Bone buried two shots in the last minute to secure the 27–26 victory and begin a new era of achievement for USC basketball.

=== The Sam Barry era (1929–50) ===
When football assistant and basketball head coach Leo Calland left USC in the summer of 1929 to become the football head coach and athletic director of the University of Idaho, legendary USC football coach Howard Jones found himself in need of a new assistant and the university in need of a new basketball head coach. Jones recommended Sam Barry, one of his former assistants at the University of Iowa who had also coached Hawkeye basketball for seven years. Barry agreed to follow Jones west, once more joining his football staff while also taking control of the basketball program.

==== Building a national power (1929–41) ====
Barry brought with him an aggressive style of play uncommon outside the Midwest. His strategic innovations would lay the groundwork for the Triangle offense and his campaign to do away with the center jump after each basket would change the game forever. "It is rumored that other conference coaches are eyeing the Trojans with no little anxiety," the Daily Trojan mused in the lead up to Barry's first season. The Trojans finished the 1929–30 season with an overall record of 15–5. USC defeated the Washington Huskies in three games to win the PCC championship for the second time in school history. Guard Johnny Lehners and center Jess Mortensen received All-America honors at the end of the season, becoming the first two All-Americans in program history.

Producing three more All-Americans (Jerry Nemer, Lee Guttero [2-time], Eddie Oram), USC dominated the PCC South Division for much of the 1930s, with five straight division titles from 1932 to 1936 and a title in 1939. In 1935 the Trojans also won the conference title with a victory over Oregon State in Corvallis. After falling to the Beavers in the first game of the series, USC won the second to tie the series. USC won the third contest by a score of 32–31, with All-Southern Division forward Ernie Holbrook making the game-winning shot in the final seconds of the game.

USC won its ninth division title in 12 years in the 1939–40 season after defeating Oregon State in two games at the Shrine Auditorium. Led by All-American Ralph Vaughn, USC received its first invitation to the eight-team NCAA tournament and was considered a favorite to challenge for the national title. The Trojans defeated Colorado, 38–32, in the first round to face Phog Allen's Kansas in the semi-finals. Senior Keith Lambert gave the Trojans the lead with less than a minute remaining in the game, but Howard Engleman scored with 16 seconds remaining to give Kansas the 43–42 win.

==== World War II and the coaching carousel (1942–45) ====
In January 1942, Barry, then-head coach of the three major sports at USC, enlisted in the Navy as a lieutenant commander and was appointed athletic director for the Navy's western V-5 physical training school in St. Marys, Georgia. Assistant coach Julie Bescos assumed head-coaching responsibilities in Barry's absence, finishing the season until he too left for service in the Navy later in 1942. Jack Hupp, two-time All-Southern Division forward for USC in 1935 and 1936, was then named head coach in October, but in November he joined the Air Force. Ernie Holbrook, Hupp's former teammate and star of the 1935 PCC champion team, then became head coach after the first game of the season and led the Trojans to a 23–5 record and their tenth PCC South Division title in the 1943–44 season. Gene Rock and Ted Gossard were named All-Americans. The following year, however, Holbrook was called to service in the Army, becoming the fourth USC basketball coach to leave for military service in two years.

Bobby Muth, a former teammate of both Hupp and Holbrook, was chosen to be the newest replacement head coach. Muth struggled to match the performance of his predecessor, with no returning players from 1943's division-winning team due to the war. In his first year as head coach, he managed a disappointing 8–12 record, USC's first losing record in 11 years.

Julie Bescos returned to USC after the war's end in 1945 as an assistant football coach, having earned a Silver Star for overseeing the rescue and evacuation of wounded sailors as a flight deck officer on the kamikaze-damaged USS Saratoga. He was posthumously inducted into the USC Athletics Hall of Fame in 2007.

Former player and coach Ernie Holbrook died during combat in Europe. As a private in the 28th "Keystone" Infantry Division, Holbrook was killed during the early stages of the Battle of the Bulge in December 1944. Each year, the Ernie Holbrook Memorial Award is given in his memory to the team's most inspirational basketball player.

==== Sam Barry returns (1945–50) ====
With the surrender of the Japanese in August 1945, Sam Barry was discharged from the Navy, receiving a Naval Commendation for his work in the physical and military training of Navy personnel in the South Pacific. He then returned to his pre-war post as head basketball coach. Barry never managed to truly to regain his pre-war success, however. Before the war, Barry compiled a win–loss record of 208–95, winning 68% of his games. In games after the war, his winning percentage fell to 58%, with an overall record of 68–49. Despite this decline in performance, Barry's teams still finished second in the division in all but one season during the final five years of his career.

Barry's 1949–50 USC team produced another All-American in Bill Sharman. On September 23, 1950, while scouting for football at Memorial Stadium in Berkeley, Barry suffered a heart attack and died at the age of 57. He remains USC's all-time winningest coach, with an overall record of 260–138. In his 17 years as head coach, his teams won eight division titles and three conference titles, and featured eight All-Americans. His 40 consecutive wins over crosstown rival UCLA stand as the longest winning streak by any coach against a single opponent in the history of college basketball.

=== The Forrest Twogood era (1951–66) ===
In the wake of Sam Barry's sudden death in September 1950, USC turned to assistant coach Forrest Twogood, who had previously been the head coach at the University of Idaho and the University of San Francisco. Mr Twogood had worked as an assistant to Barry, coaching the Trojan freshmen, and had played for Barry at the University of Iowa.

==== The Final Four (1954) ====
Hail Welsh! Hail Pausig! Hail Irvin! Hail Hammer! Hail Psaltis! Hail Carr! Hail Twogood! Hail the Trojans!
SC is 1954 undisputed Pacific Coast Conference basketball champion.

—Jack McCurdy in the Daily Trojan, March 9, 1954

Two weeks before the 1953–54 season's end and in third place in the PCC, USC won two games against then-second-place California. The Trojans' next and final conference series of the regular season came against the first-place UCLA Bruins. Coming into the series, John Wooden's Bruins—winners of four division titles in five years—were on a 13-game win streak, had not been defeated at home all season, had not lost both games of a series at home in six years, and needed just one win in two games to secure the division title.

USC's third team All-America center, Roy Irvin, scored 29 points in the first game in leading the Trojans past the Bruins, 79–68. In the second contest, another strong performance from Irvin saw the Trojans with the lead late in the game, until UCLA tied the score in the final minute. Trojan substitute Chet Carr made a 10-foot jump-shot in the waning seconds, securing the win and the Trojans' first outright division championship in 11 years.

The Daily Trojan following USC's PCC championship.

USC faced the Oregon State Beavers and their 7-foot, 3-inch center, Wade Halbrook in the PCC Championship series to determine which team would represent the PCC in the NCAA Tournament. In the opening game of the series, the Trojans contained Halbrook and came away with a 65–47 victory. In the second game, Halbrook scored 12 points and stifled the USC offense with his rebounding and defense. The Beavers outscored the Trojans 20–6 in the final ten minutes of the first half, and despite a third-quarter comeback attempt, USC was defeated for the first time in six games.

The final game was a close affair throughout. Halbrook and Irvin led their teams' efforts in the final minutes, trading baskets and the lead until Irvin's hook shot gave the Trojans the lead for good with under a minute remaining. Two free throws from captain Dick Welsh with 27 seconds remaining secured the 48–45 win for USC.

USC advanced to the 16-team NCAA Tournament and began tournament play in Corvallis, where the Trojans defeated Idaho State in the first round, 73–59. In the second-round game, the Trojans faced the Santa Clara Broncos, a team that had played in three consecutive NCAA Tournaments. The game was closely contested throughout, with 13 lead changes and eight ties. The third quarter saw a forward surge from the Trojans, which the Broncos matched as the quarter closed. Santa Clara entered the final 40 seconds of a low-scoring fourth quarter with a three-point lead. USC's Irvin was fouled as he scored on a lay-in, and his made free throw tied the game at 57–57. The score remained tied at the end of the regulation period. In the final minute of the overtime period, the Trojans again trailed by three points. Welsh scored to bring the Trojans within one point of Santa Clara. Guard Tony Psaltis then tied the score at 65–65 with a free throw, forcing a second overtime period.

A single point—coming on a free throw from USC's Welsh during the first 30 seconds of the second five-minute overtime period—provided the winning margin for the Trojans. In the same year the NBA introduced the 24-second shot clock, Santa Clara held the ball to stall the game for four minutes and seven seconds. With 17 seconds remaining, the Broncos' Ken Sears attempted to drive to the basket. Several Trojans surrounded him and forced a turnover. Time expired and the Trojans advanced to the Final Four in Kansas City.

USC faced the Bradley Braves in the Final Four game. The Trojans maintained a lead for most of the contest, but Bradley mounted a comeback in the fourth quarter. Holding a one-point lead with one minute remaining, the Trojans were without leading scorer Roy Irvin, who had fouled out of the game. Bradley scored five unanswered points in the final minute to take a 74–70 lead, securing the win. USC's Jack Dunne scored with six seconds remaining, but the score was not sufficient to erase the Trojans' deficit. USC fell to Penn State in the national third-place game, 70–61, after the Trojans' late comeback attempt, begun as they trailed by 20 points, fell short.

The USC student-run newspaper, the Daily Trojan, reflected on the season:

The fact remains that what they already have done is simply phenomenal. They have defied all the "impossible," "can't do," "never," and "too much" odds to rise to this station today. On their way they won the PCC Southern Division, Pacific Coast Conference and NCAA Western Regional titles. This should seem "enough" for a team that was once pronounced "dead."

- Jack McCurdy, March 19, 1954

=== The Bob Boyd era (1967–79) ===
In a 13-year career as head coach of the USC basketball team his teams went 216–131 overall and played in the post-season four times (the 1979 NCAA playoffs, 1973 NIT and 1974 and 1975 Commissioner's Conference tourney). His 1971 team, which went 24–2 and was ranked fifth in the nation (USC was ranked first at midseason), is regarded among USC's best (he also won 24 games in 1974). His wins over UCLA in 1969 and 1970 were the UCLA's first losses in Pauley Pavilion, built in 1966. He was twice named the conference Coach of the Year. He sent ten players into the NBA, including Paul Westphal and Gus Williams.

=== Morrison and Raveling (1980–94) ===
In seven seasons at USC, Stan Morrison had a record of 103–95 and finished first in the Pac-10 in 1985. George Raveling took over the program in 1987, leading the Trojans to two NCAA tournament appearances. He compiled a 115–118 overall record in eight seasons.

=== The Henry Bibby era (1995–2005) ===
In 1995, Former UCLA great Henry Bibby was named head coach of USC men's basketball. In ten seasons, Bibby had an overall won-loss record of 131–111 at USC. He led his 1997, 2001 and 2002 teams to the NCAA tournament, including an "Elite Eight" appearance in 2001, but was fired after four games into his final season.

=== Recent success ===
USC advanced to the Sweet Sixteen in the 2007 NCAA Division I men's basketball tournament, led by future NBA players Nick Young, Taj Gibson, and Gabe Pruitt, with Tim Floyd as their head coach. This was the first time since 2001, and the second time since 1961. This team defeated Kevin Durant and the Texas Longhorns before facing Tyler Hansbrough and the UNC Tar Heels in the Sweet Sixteen. USC had built a sizable lead in the first half against UNC before multiple questionable foul calls against Taj Gibson forced USC to sit Taj Gibson for an extended period of time in the second half, whereby the Tar Heels were able to take the lead and win the game.

==== 2007–08 ====
In the 2007–08 season, USC featured guard O. J. Mayo from Huntington High School. He had been ranked by several major sports publications as the top prospect of the 2007 recruiting class. During the 2007–2008 season, the Trojans played the Kansas Jayhawks and the Oklahoma Sooners at home. They also played in the Anaheim Classic from November 22–25, 2007. Each night, USC played a team from the Big Ten, Big East, SEC, and Big 12. Additionally, they had a return game against the South Carolina Gamecocks in Columbia, South Carolina. After the regular season and Pac-10 Tournament had ended, USC earned a #6 seed in the NCAA Tournament. The Trojans were seeded against the #11 seed Kansas State Wildcats. This first-round game gained heavy media attention because of the matchup between college phenoms O. J. Mayo and Michael Beasley. Although the game was relatively close throughout the first half and early second half, the Wildcats came away with the victory by a score of 80–67. As expected by many, Mayo entered the NBA draft at the end of the 2007–08 season. He was selected as the 3rd overall lottery pick by the Minnesota Timberwolves. The Trojans finished the 2007–08 season with a record of 21–12. However, on January 3, 2010, the University concluded its internal investigation over allegations that Mayo received improper benefits during his stay at USC in 2007–08. The University concluded that Mayo did receive improper benefits and that head coach Tim Floyd was an active participant in ensuring that Mayo continued to receive money and gifts on behalf of a sports agent, in violation of NCAA rules. Therefore, USC declared Mayo ineligible to play in 2007–08, and USC Basketball has voluntarily vacated all regular season wins from the 2007–08 season. The USC record for 2007–08 thus is 0–12, a result of the peculiar scoring rules for marking vacated wins as no contests.

==== 2008–09 ====
The 2008–09 Trojans team featured the 3rd-ranked recruit in the nation according to Rivals.com, All-American forward DeMar DeRozan. USC also received a commitment from point guard Percy Romeo Miller, Jr aka Lil Romeo, the son of Master P. The team opted not to have an October 17, 2008 Midnight Madness celebration.

Building upon the success of previous years, the Trojans defeated Arizona State in the Pac-10 Championship Game and clinched their third straight NCAA Tournament appearance. They defeated Boston College to reach the second round, where they lost 74–69 to eventual runner-up Michigan State.

=== The Kevin O'Neill era (2009–2013) ===
Kevin James O'Neill was named head coach of the USC men's basketball team on June 20, 2009, inheriting a program under serious NCAA sanctions linked to former player O.J. Mayo. Despite significant obstacles including postseason bans and the loss of key recruits, O'Neill brought extensive experience from coaching at college and NBA levels to rebuild the team.

In his inaugural 2009-10 season, O'Neill led the Trojans to a 16-14 record, tying for fifth in the Pac-10 and earning the 2010 Pac-10 Coach of the Year award from CollegeInsiders.com. The team recorded an eight-game winning streak and won the inaugural Diamond Head Classic in Hawaii, defeating several NCAA tournament teams including No. 9 Tennessee and UNLV.

The 2010-11 season marked the peak of O'Neill's tenure as USC finished 19-15, secured an NCAA Tournament berth, and tied for fourth in the Pac-10. The Trojans were eliminated in the first round by eventual Final Four team VCU. Key to the team's success was the emergence of Nikola Vucevic, who transformed under O'Neill's coaching to become a first team all-conference player and future NBA draft pick. USC also ranked high defensively in the Pac-10, holding opponents to a .409 shooting percentage and a conference low in scoring.

However, injuries devastated the 2011-12 roster, with senior point guard Jio Fontan, and starting forwards Dewayne Dedmon and Aaron Fuller sidelined, leaving USC with just six scholarship players and a struggling 6-26 season. Recruiting challenges and inconsistency continued into 2012-13, and O'Neill was relieved of his duties in January 2013 after a 7-10 start, ending a four-year rebuilding effort.

Top Contributors:

2009–10 Season: Dwight Lewis (G): Senior guard: 13.8 PPG, 3.3 RPG, 2.2 APG (led team in scoring) Nikola Vucevic (F): Sophomore forward: 10.7 PPG, 9.4 RPG, 1.3 BPG, .504 FG% (led Pac-10 in rebounding, double-doubles leader, Pac-10 Most Improved) Alex Stepheson (F): Junior transfer, strong rebounder and shot-blocker, complementing Vucevic. Donte Smith (G): Contributed perimeter scoring and leadership as a junior guard.

2010–11 Season: Key Performers Nikola Vucevic (F): Junior, 17.1 PPG, 10.3 RPG, 1.4 BPG, .500 FG% (All-Pac-10 First Team, team leader in points and rebounds) Jio Fontan (G): Sophomore transfer, 10.5 PPG, 3.9 APG Alex Stepheson (F): Senior, double-double threat, provided physicality and rebounding. Maurice Jones (G): Freshman, big defensive stats, exceptional in steals and assists. Marcus Simmons (G): Named 2011 Pac-10 Defensive Player of the Year and selected to the Pac-10 All-Defensive Team. Bryce Dejean-Jones played for USC during the 2010–11 season before transferring to UNLV and later Iowa State. At USC, he appeared in 18 of 34 games, starting the first 10 games, and averaged: 7.6 PPG, 2.6 RPG, 1.6 APG, 1.1 SPG, Shooting 37.9% from the field and 34.5% from three-point range.

2011–12 Season: Key Contributors Maurice Jones (G): Led Pac-12 in minutes played per game (38.2); set USC record with seven made three-pointers without a miss in one game; scored 23 double-figure games; carried team offensively during injury-plagued season. Aaron Fuller (F): Rebounding leader before injury. Byron Wesley (G): Showed promise as a freshman.

2012–13 Season: Top Performers and Stats Jio Fontan (G): Senior, 9.3 PPG, 5.3 APG (team leader in assists; Captain), team MVP. Eric Wise (F): Senior, leading scorer and rebounder, team MVP. Dewayne Dedmon (C): Redshirt Junior, PPG: 6.7, RPG: 7.0 (team-leading rebounder), BPG: 2.1 (second best in Pac-12, sixth nationally) Omar Oraby (C): Defensive anchor, led team in blocks and altered shots. Byron Wesley (G): Continued to provide athleticism and finishing.

O'Neill's tenure reflected a commitment to defensive intensity and player development amidst tough sanctions and roster challenges. His record was approximately 48-70 overall, with the high point of an NCAA tournament appearance in 2010-11. He was replaced midseason in 2013 by associate head coach Bob Cantu.

=== Sanctions ===
On January 3, 2010, USC announced that it had implemented self-imposed sanctions for violations of NCAA rules related to Mayo. The sanctions include a one-year ban on postseason competition following the 2009–2010 regular season, a reduction of one scholarship for the 2009–2010 and 2010–2011 academic years, and reductions in the numbers of recruiting days and coaches participating in off-campus recruiting through 2011. The school also vacated all wins earned during the 2007–2008 season, due to Mayo's ineligibility at that time. Prior to the announcement USC was on a winning streak, improving their record to 10–4 overall and 2–0 in the Pac-10 conference, including a win on December 31, 2009, against Arizona and on January 2, 2010, against Arizona State. Their schedule that season featured challenging games against top-ranked teams like Texas, Saint Mary's and Tennessee and included the Diamond Head Classic Championship.

=== Andy Enfield and return to prominence (2013–2024) ===
After becoming the first head coach to lead a 15-seed to the Sweet 16, guiding his Florida Gulf Coast Eagles to upsets of Georgetown and San Diego State, Andy Enfield was hired as the new head coach at USC on April 1, 2013. Enfield replaces interim coach Bob Cantu, who substituted for fired coach Kevin O'Neill, terminated after a 7–10 start to the Trojans' season. The Trojans had finished the season 14–18 and had missed the NCAA Tournament the previous two years.

Enfield's first two assistant hires were Tony Bland from SDSU with a reported contract of $300,000 per year, and Jason Hart from Pepperdine University. Both have strong reputations as recruiters.

On September 26, 2017, federal prosecutors announced bribery, soliciting a bribe and wire fraud charges against assistant coach Tony Bland.

On April 4, 2024, Enfield was replaced by Eric Musselman, who departed from being the head basketball coach for the University of Arkansas.

== Facilities ==
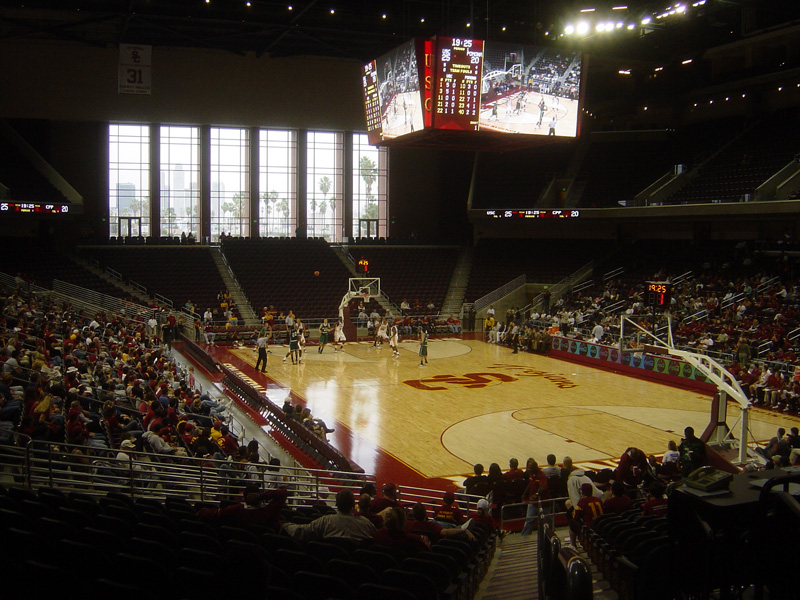
USC men playing a pre-season game against the Cal Poly Broncos at Galen Center.

The stage of Shrine Auditorium served as home court for USC basketball for much of the 1940s. However, the nature of hosting a basketball game in a theater meant that visibility was limited except in the center section of the audience. "If you had a seat on the extreme right or left, you missed seeing one basket," said Alex Omalev, a Trojan forward from 1940 to 1943. The score was kept by two men seated on an elevated platform and a gun blast marked the end of each half.

Beginning in 1949 the Pan-Pacific Auditorium in the Fairfax District hosted USC basketball until 1959 at which point the Trojans moved into the nearby Los Angeles Memorial Sports Arena, where they would remain for close to the next 50 years.

USC had talked about building an on-campus arena for the better part of a century and that dream finally came to fruition when Louis Galen, successful banker and long-time Trojan fan, donated a total $50 million to ensure the facility was built. They broke ground in 2004 and the Galen Center officially opened its doors in 2006, becoming the new home of USC basketball.

The facility is 255,000 square feet (23,700 m2), with a 45,000 square foot (4,200 m2) pavilion, and has three practice courts and offices. The seating capacity is 10,258, and there are 22 private suites. Total construction cost was an estimated $147 million.

The first men's basketball game was held on November 16, 2006 against the University of South Carolina. The first sellout crowd was the men's basketball game against the UCLA Bruins on January 12, 2007 with an attendance of 9,682. On January 31, 2008 the USC men's basketball game against the Arizona Wildcats set the arena's attendance record with a crowd of 10,258 in attendance. That record has been matched four times since: February 17, 2008 vs UCLA; January 11, 2009 vs UCLA; January 9, 2011 vs UCLA, and February 13, 2022 vs. UCLA (which also saw the largest student section to date).

== Coaches ==
The following are the USC men's head basketball coaches who have led the Trojans against conference competition. Prior to fielding conference teams, USC men's basketball was also coached by notable USC coaches such as Dean Cromwell who was a track and field and baseball coach as well as Elmer "Gloomy Gus" Henderson who also coached baseball and football at USC.

- Bill Hunter (1922)
- Les Turner (1923–27)
- Leo Calland (1928–29)
- Sam Barry (1930–41, 1946–50)
- Julie Bescos (1942)
- Ernie Holbrook (1943–44)
- Bobby Muth (1944–45)
- Forrest Twogood (1951–66)
- Bob Boyd (1967–79)
- Stan Morrison (1980–86)
- George Raveling (1987–94)
- Charlie Parker (1994–1995)
- Henry Bibby (1995–2005)
- Jim Saia (2004–05, interim head coach)
- Tim Floyd (2005–09)
- Kevin O'Neill (2009–2013)
- Bob Cantu (2013, interim head coach)
- Andy Enfield (2013–2024)
- Eric Musselman (2024–present)

== Postseason ==
=== NCAA tournament results ===
The Trojans have appeared in twenty NCAA Tournaments (with one appearance vacated), including two Final Four appearances. USC's combined record is 17–23* (17–22).

Year	Record	Seed	Round	Opponent	Result
2023	22–11	#10	First Round	#7 Michigan State	L 62–72
2022	26–7	#7	First Round	#10 Miami (FL)	L 66–68
2021	25–8	#6	First Round; Second Round; Sweet Sixteen; Elite Eight	#11 Drake #3 Kansas #7 Oregon #1 Gonzaga	W 72–56; W 85–51; W 82–68; L 66–85
2017	26–10	#11	First Four; First Round; Round of 32	#11 Providence #6 SMU #3 Baylor	W 75–71; W 66–65; L 78–82
2016	21–13	#8	First Round	#9 Providence	L 69–70
2011	19–14	#11	First Four	#11 VCU	L 46–59
2009	21–12	#10	First Round; Second Round	#7 Boston College #2 Michigan State	W 72–55; L 69–74
2008*	21–12	#6	First Round	#11 Kansas State	L 67–80*
2007	25–12	#5	First Round; Second Round; Sweet Sixteen	#12 Arkansas #4 Texas #1 North Carolina	W 77–60; W 87–68; L 64–74
2002	22–10	#4	First Round	#13 UNC Wilmington	L 89–93 ^{OT}
2001	24–10	#6	First Round; Second Round; Sweet Sixteen; Elite Eight	#11 Oklahoma State #3 Boston College #2 Kentucky #1 Duke	W 69–54; W 74–71; W 80–76; L 69–79
1997	17–11	#11	First Round	#6 Illinois	L 77–90
1992	24–6	#2	First Round; Second Round	#15 Northeast Louisiana #7 Georgia Tech	W 84–54; L 78–79
1991	19–10	#10	First Round	#7 Florida State	L 72–75
1985	19–10	#8	First Round	#9 Illinois State	L 55–58
1982	19–9	#9	Round of 48	#8 Wyoming	L 58–61
1979	20–9	#7	Round of 40; Second Round	#10 Utah State #2 DePaul	W 86–67; L 78–89
1961	21–8	N/A	Round of 24; Sweet Sixteen; Regional 3rd Place	Oregon; Arizona State; Loyola Marymount	W 81–79; L 71–86; L 67–69
1960	16–11	N/A	Round of 25	Utah	L 73–80
1954	19–14	N/A	Sweet Sixteen; Elite Eight; Final Four; National 3rd Place Game	Idaho State; Santa Clara; Bradley; Penn State	W 73–59; W 66–65 ^{2OT} L 72–74; L 70–61
1940	20–3	N/A	Elite Eight; Final Four	Colorado; Kansas	W 38–32; L 42–43

* 2008 tournament appearance and loss to Kansas State were vacated due to NCAA penalty. The revised record is 17–22 all-time.

=== NCAA tournament seeding history ===
The NCAA began seeding the tournament with the 1979 edition.

Years →	'79	'82	'85	'91	'92	'97	'01	'02	'07	'08	'09	'11	'16	'17	'21	'22
Seeds→	7	9	8	10	2	11	6	4	5	6*	10	11	8	11	6	7

=== NIT results ===
The Trojans have appeared in the National Invitation Tournament (NIT) five times. Their combined record is 3–5.

Year	Round	Opponent	Result
1973	First Round	Notre Dame	L 65–69
1993	First Round; Second Round; Quarterfinals	UNLV; Pepperdine; Minnesota	W 90–73; W 71–59; L 58–76
1994	First Round	Fresno State	L 76–79
1999	First Round	Wyoming	L 77–81
2018	First Round; Second Round	UNC Asheville; Western Kentucky	W 103–98 ^{2OT} L 75–79

=== CCA/NCIT results ===
The Trojans appeared in both the 1974 CCA Tournament and the 1975 NCIT Tournament. Their combined record was 2–2.

Year	Round	Opponent	Result
1974	Quarterfinals; Semifinals; Finals	SMU; Bradley; Indiana	W 80–72; W 76–73; L 60–85
1975	Quarterfinals	Drake	L 70–80

=== CBC results ===
The Trojans have appeared in the College Basketball Crown once. Their overall record is 1–1.

Year	Round	Opponent	Result
2025	First Round; Quarterfinals	Tulane; Villanova	W 89–60; L 59–60

== All-time record vs. former Pac-12 opponents ==
The USC Trojans lead the all-time series vs. three of the former Pac-12 opponents. They trail the series vs. five opponents.

Opponent	Wins	Losses	Pct.	Streak
Opponent	Wins	Losses	Pct.	Streak
Arizona	42	66	.383	USC 1
Arizona St.	53	42	.564	USC 1
Cal	124	136	.477	USC 2
Colorado	7	9	.438	USC 4
Oregon St.	73	63	.537	USC 6
Stanford	124	125	.498	USC 1
Utah	19	22	.463	USC 2
Wash. St.	74	48	.607	USC 5

=== Record vs. Big Ten Opponents ===
All-time series includes non-conference matchups.

Opponent	Wins	Losses	Pct.	Streak
Illinois	6	3	(.667)	USC 1
Indiana	1	1	(.500)	Indiana 1
Iowa	2	5	(.286)	USC 1
Maryland	0	3	(.000)	Maryland 3
Michigan	1	0	(1.000)	USC 1
Michigan State	3	4	(.429)	Michigan State 1
Minnesota	2	4	(.333)	USC 1
Nebraska	5	5	(.500)	USC 2
Northwestern	3	1	(.750)	USC 2
Ohio State	3	3	(.500)	Ohio St 1
Oregon	69	63	(.523)	Oregon 3
Penn State	0	2	(.000)	Penn State 2
Purdue	2	2	(.500)	USC 1
Rutgers	2	0	(1.000)	USC 2
UCLA	109	142	(.434)	USC 1
Washington	80	72	(.526)	USC 9
Wisconsin	1	1	(.500)	Wisconsin 1

- Note all-time series includes non-conference matchups.
  - Vacated wins are not counted in this table.

Updated April 4, 2024

== Retired numbers ==
The Trojans have retired seven jersey numbers.

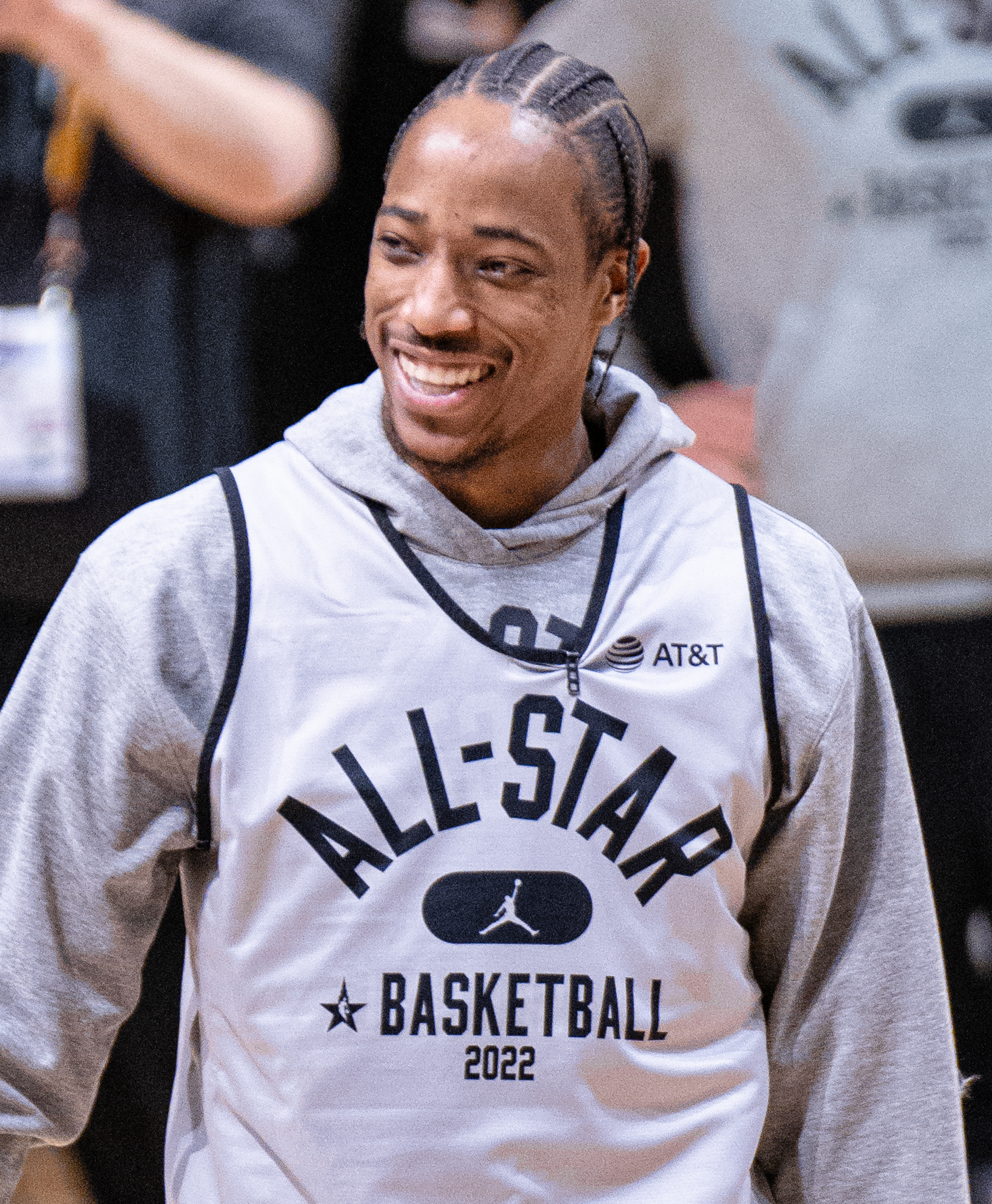
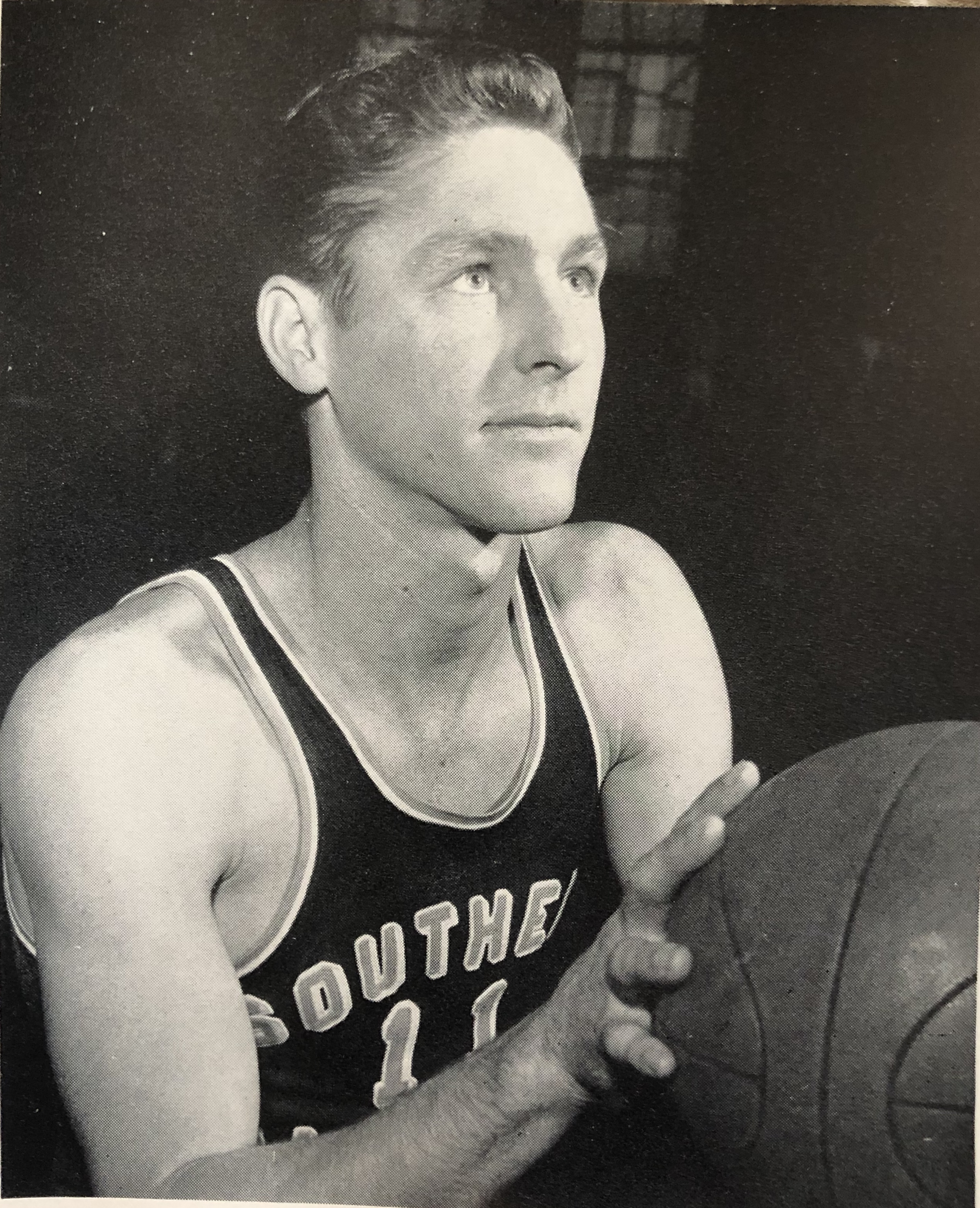
DeMar DeRozan (left) and Bill Sharman, two USC players whose numbers were retired

USC Trojans retired numbers
No.	Player	Tenure	No. ret	Ref.
10	Gus Williams	1972–1975	2016	
10	DeMar DeRozan	2008–2009	2020	
11	Bill Sharman	1946–1950	2007	
19	Bob Boyd	1950–1952	2017	
23	Harold Miner	1989–1992	2012	
25	Paul Westphal	1969–1972	2007	
44	John Rudometkin	1959–1962	2010	

== Notable players ==
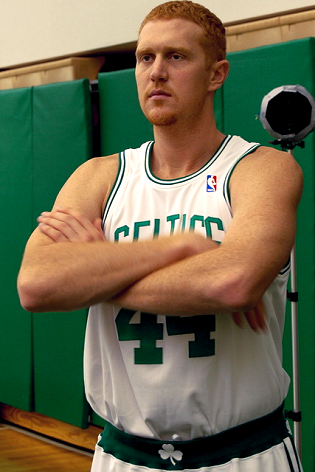
Brian Scalabrine

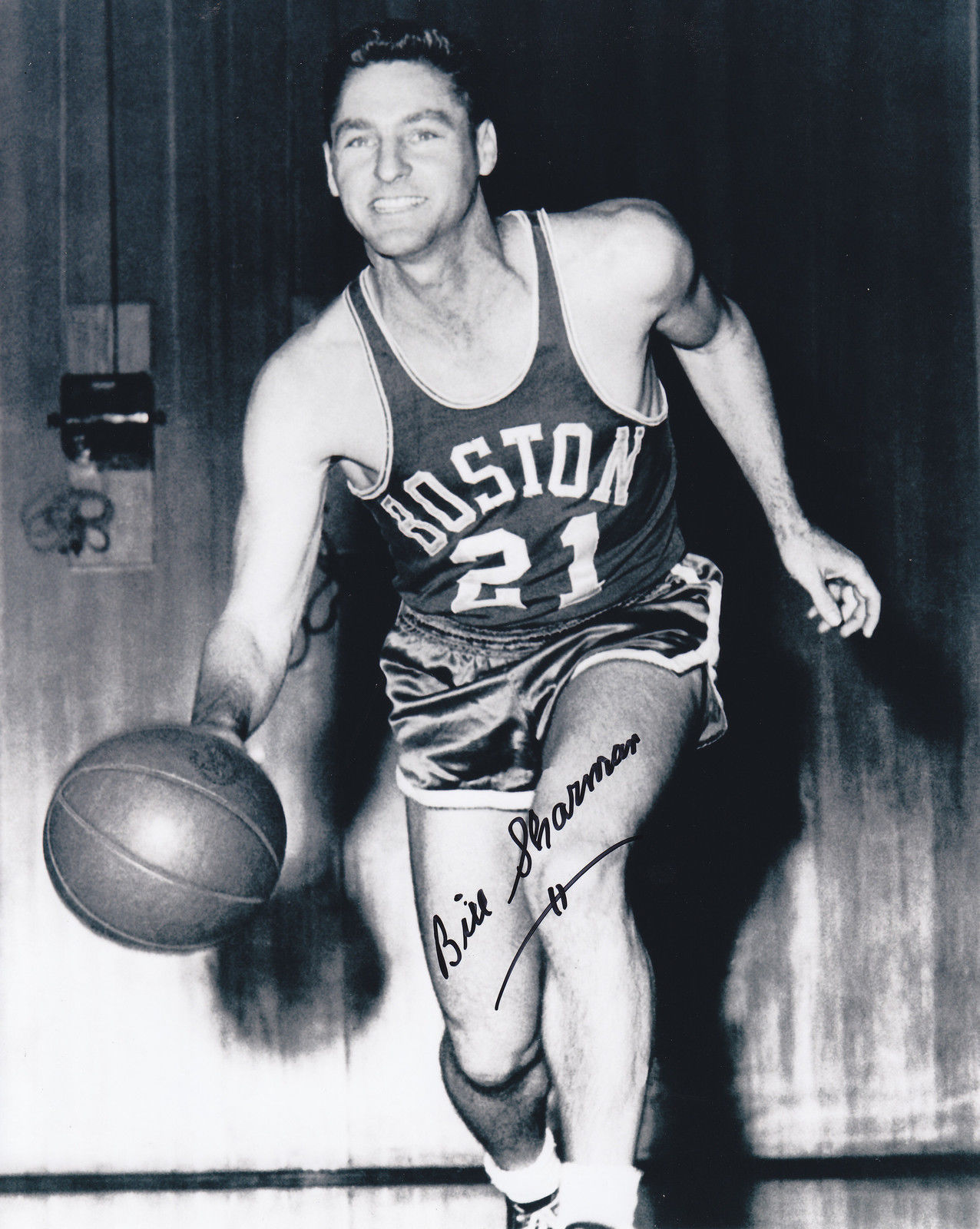
Bill Sharman

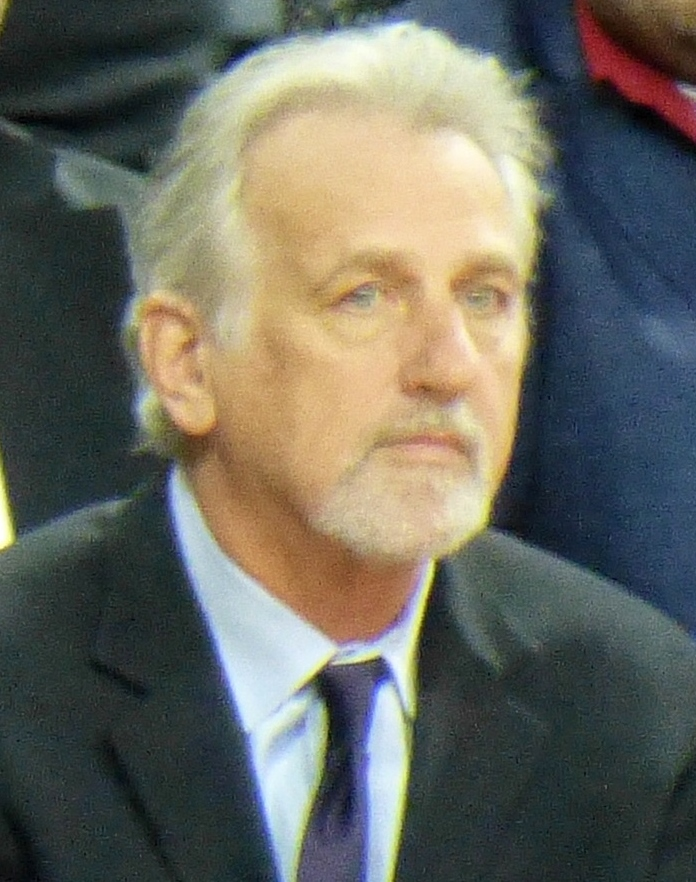
Paul Westphal

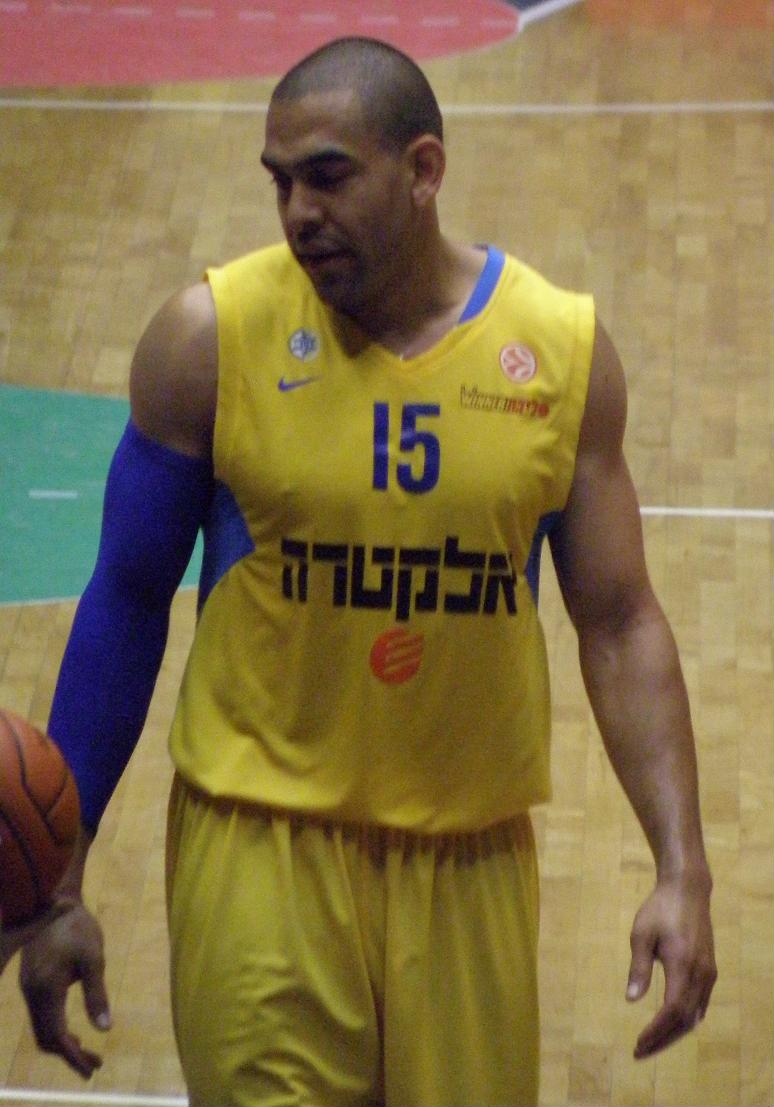
David Bluthenthal

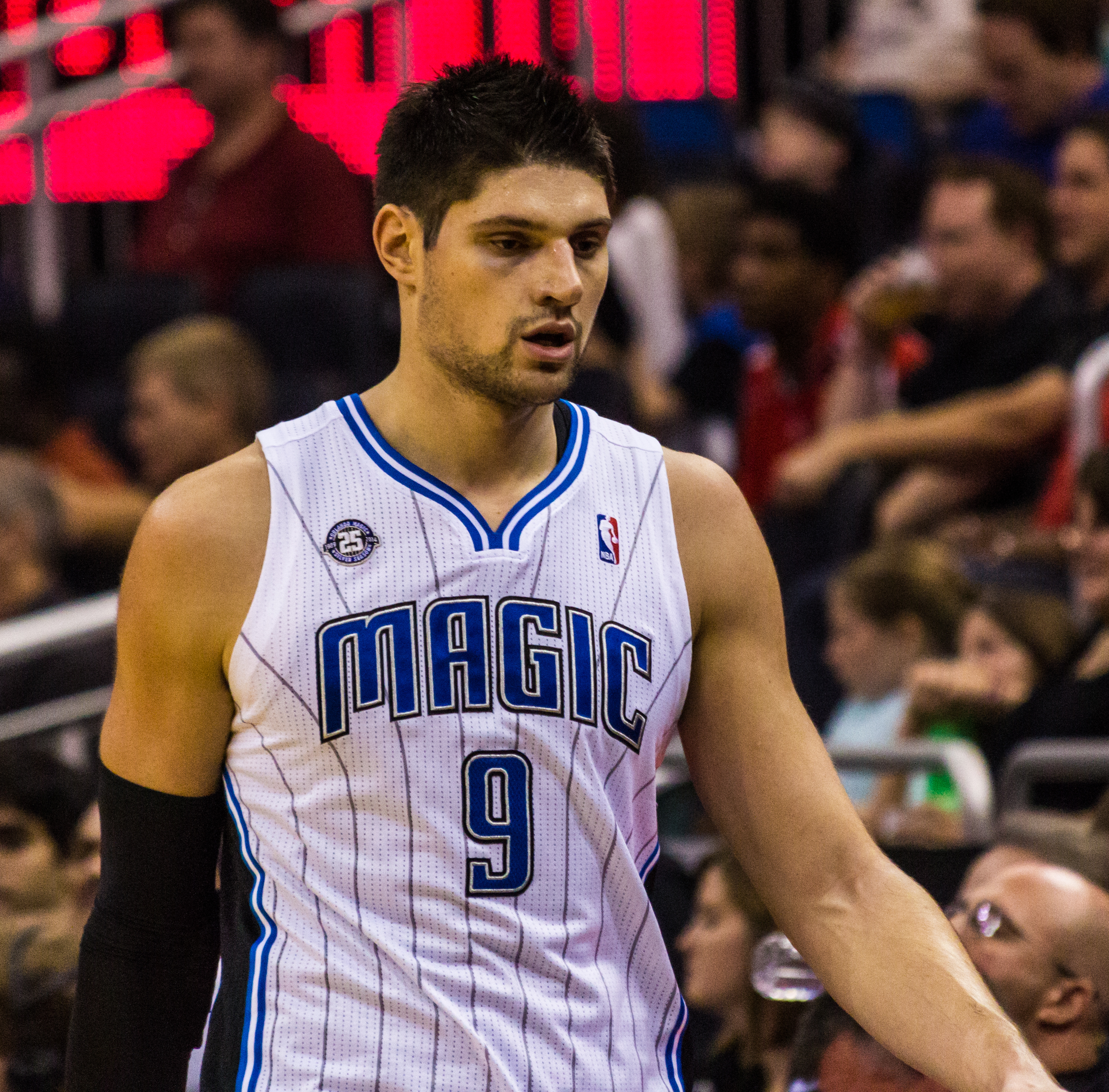
Nikola Vucevic

- Tex Winter (1946–1947)

Innovator of the triangle offense, nine-time NBA champion as an assistant coach (Bulls, Lakers), UPI Coach of the Year (1958), Naismith Basketball Hall of Famer, National Collegiate Basketball Hall of Famer, USC Athletics Hall of Famer, Naismith Basketball Hall of Fame John Bunn Award (lifetime achievement) honoree, NBA Coaches Association Chuck Daly Lifetime Achievement Award honoree, USC Athletics Hall of Famer.

- Bill Sharman (1946–1950)

All-American, 2-time All-Pacific Coast Conference, PCC MVP, 4-time All-NBA First Team, 8-time NBA All-Star (1953–1960) NBA All-Star Game MVP (1961), 4-time NBA champion as a player (Celtics), NBA champion as a coach (Lakers), NBA Coach of the Year (1972), 5-time NBA champion as executive (Lakers), first coach to win championships in three different pro leagues (ABL, ABA, NBA), Naismith Memorial Basketball Hall of Famer as a coach and player, USC Athletics Hall of Famer.

- Alex Hannum (1943, 1946–1947)

1948 captain, 2-time NBA champion as a coach (Hawks, 76ers), NBA Coach of the Year (1964), ABA Coach of the Year (1969), Naismith Memorial Basketball Hall of Famer.

- Paul Westphal (1969–1972)

1972 captain, All-American, 3-time All-Pac-10, NBA champion as a player (Celtics), 5-time NBA All-Star, 3-time All-NBA First Team, #44 retired by the Phoenix Suns.

- Gus Williams (1971–1975)

All-American, 2-time All-Pac-10, NBA champion as a player (SuperSonics), 2-time All-Star, All-NBA First Team (1982), #1 Retired by the Seattle SuperSonics.

- Harold Miner (1989–1992)

3-time All American, 3-time All-Pac-10, Pac-10 Freshman of the Year (1990), Sports Illustrated National Player of the Year (1992), Pac-10 Player of the Year (1992), 2-time NBA Slam Dunk Contest champion

- Brian Scalabrine (1998–2001)

3-time All-Pac-10, Pac-10 Newcomer of the Year (1999), NBA Champion with the Boston Celtics (2008)

- David Blu (1998–2002)

American-Israeli 2-time Euroleague Champion (Maccabi Tel Aviv)

- Nick Young (2004–2007)

2-time All-Pac-10

- Taj Gibson (2006–2009)

2009 captain, 2-time All-Pac-10, Pac-10 Defensive Player of the Year (2009), NBA All-Rookie First Team

- O. J. Mayo (2007–2008)

2008 captain, All-Pac-10, NBA All-Rookie First Team. Mayo was also the recipient of improper benefits and USC was forced to vacate the 21 wins from the 2007–08 season.

- DeMar DeRozan (2008–2009)

Pac-10 All-Freshman Team, Pac-10 Tournament Most Valuable Player (2009), NBA All-Star (2013–14, 2015–17).

- Nikola Vučević (2008–2011)

2-time All-Pac-10, AP All-American Honorable Mention, NBA Rising Star, NBA All-Star (2019, 2021).

- Dewayne Dedmon (2011–2013)

Multi year NBA starter.

- Chimezie Metu (2015–2018)

2018 NBA Draft Second Round Draft Pick

- De'Anthony Melton (2016–2018)

2018 NBA Draft Second Round Draft Pick

- Jordan McLaughlin (2014–2018)

2018 First Team All-Pac-12, 3rd player in conference history to record over 1,600 points and 600 assists, current point guard for the San Antonio Spurs

- Kevin Porter Jr. (2018–2019)

2019 NBA Draft First Round Draft Pick

- Onyeka Okongwu (2019–2020)

First Team All-Pac-12, 2020 NBA Draft First Round Draft Pick

- Evan Mobley (2020–2021)

In his one season with USC, he led the Trojans to the Elite Eight. He was awarded Pac 12 Player of the Year, Pac 12 Freshman of the Year, Pac 12 Defensive Player of the Year, First Team All Pac 12, Pac 12 All Defensive Team, Pac 12 All Freshman Team, and was a Consensus Second-Team All American. Mobley was selected by the Cleveland Cavaliers with the 3rd overall pick of the 2021 NBA draft.

- Isaiah Mobley (2019–2022)

First-team All-Pac-12 and McDonald's All-American. Selected by the Cleveland Cavaliers in the Second Round of the 2022 NBA draft. All-NBA G League Third Team.

== Records ==
=== Career leaders ===
Rank	Points	3-pt FGs	Rebounds	Assists	Steals	Blocks
1.	2,048 – Harold Miner; 1990–92	247 – Jonah Mathews; 2017–20	1,067 – Ron Riley; 1970–72	779 – Brandon Granville; 1999–2002	229 – Brandon Granville; 1999–2002	253 – Taj Gibson; 2007–09
2.	1,727 – Ronnie Coleman; 1988–91	245 – Elijah Stewart; 2015–18	916 – Nick Rakocevic; 2017–20	738 – Jordan McLaughlin; 2015–18	224 – Errick Craven; 2002–05	195 – Sam Clancy; 1999–2002
3.	1,657 – Sam Clancy; 1999–2002	243 – Bennie Boatwright; 2016–19	896 – Taj Gibson; 2007–09	409 – Larry Friend; 1983–86	213 – Jordan McLaughlin; 2015–18	168 – Chimezie Metu; 2016–18
4.	1,648 – Jordan McLaughlin; 2015–18	232 – Lodrick Stewart; 2004–07	839 – Sam Clancy; 1999–2002	398 – Duane Cooper; 1988–89, 1991–92	208 – Stais Boseman; 1994–97	129 – Rory O'Neil; 2002–05
5.	1,606 – Desmon Farmer; 2001–04	218 – Brandon Granville; 1999–2002	831 – John Rudometkin; 1960–62	397 – Julian Jacobs; 2014–16	204 – Jeff Trepagnier; 1998–01	128 – Lorenzo Orr; 1992–95
6.	1,542 – Bennie Boatwright; 2016–19	203 – Desmon Farmer; 2001–04	822 – Allen Young; 1963–65	363 – Jacque Hill; 1980–83	179 – Derrick Dowell; 1984–87	125 – Elijah Stewart; 2015–18
7.	1,524 – Wayne Carlander; 1982–85	185 – Jordan McLaughlin; 2015–18	821 – Ronnie Coleman; 1988–91	363 – Daniel Hackett; 2007–09	158 – Gabe Pruitt; 2005–06	118 – Nick Rakocevic; 2017–20
8.	1,486 – Nick Young; 2005–07	179 – Gabe Pruitt; 2005–07	806 – Derrick Dowell; 1984–87	362 – Gus Williams; 1973–75	148 – Lodrick Stewart; 2004–06	116 – Rod Keller; 1984–87
9.	1,484 – John Rudometkin; 1960–62	176 – Harold Miner; 1990–92	768 – Roy Irvin; 1953–55	319 – Robert Pack; 1990–91	134 – Sam Clancy; 1999–2002	104 – Jeff Trepagnier; 1998–2001
10.	1,483 – Derrick Dowell; 1984–87	171 – David Bluthenthal; 1999–2002	767 – Wayne Carlander; 1982–85	313 – Dan Anderson; 1972–74	132 – Jonah Mathews; 2017–20	101 – Avondre Jones; 1993–94, 1995–96
