= 1939–40 Washington Huskies men's basketball team =

American college basketball season

1939–40 Washington Huskies men's basketball
- Conference: Pacific Coast Conference
- Record: 10–15 (6–10 PCC)
- Head coach: Hec Edmundson (20th season)
- Captain: Bill McDonald
- Home arena: UW Pavilion

1939–40 Pacific Coast Conference men's basketball standings
| | Conf. | | | | Overall |
| Team | W | | L | PCT | W | | L | PCT |
|---|---|---|---|---|---|---|---|---|
North
| Oregon State | 12 | – | 4 | .750 | 27 | – | 11 | .711 |
| Oregon | 10 | – | 6 | .625 | 19 | – | 12 | .613 |
| Washington State | 9 | – | 7 | .563 | 23 | – | 10 | .697 |
| Washington | 6 | – | 10 | .375 | 10 | – | 15 | .400 |
| Idaho | 3 | – | 13 | .188 | 11 | – | 15 | .423 |
South
| USC † | 10 | – | 2 | .833 | 20 | – | 3 | .870 |
| Stanford | 6 | – | 6 | .500 | 14 | – | 9 | .609 |
| California | 5 | – | 7 | .417 | 15 | – | 17 | .469 |
| UCLA | 3 | – | 9 | .250 | 8 | – | 17 | .320 |
† Conference playoff series winner

The 1939–40 Washington Huskies men's basketball team represented the University of Washington for the 1939–40 NCAA college basketball season. Led by twentieth-year head coach Hec Edmundson, the Huskies were members of the Pacific Coast Conference and played their home games on campus at the UW Pavilion in Seattle, Washington.

The Huskies were 10–15 overall in the regular season and 6–10 in conference play; fourth in the Northern division. In the season finale in Seattle, they upset newly-crowned division winner Oregon State.
