= 1939–40 Holy Cross Crusaders men's basketball team =

American college basketball season

1939–40 Holy Cross Crusaders men's basketball
- Conference: Independent
- Record: 2–3
- Head coach: Ed Krause (1st season)
- Captain: James O'Hare
- Home arena: N/A

The 1939–40 Holy Cross Crusaders men's basketball team represented The College of the Holy Cross during the 1939–40 college men's basketball season. The head coach was Ed Krause, coaching the crusaders in his first season.

== Schedule ==
Date time, TV	Opponent	Result	Record	Site city, state
2/03/1940*	Assumption	W 50–29	1–0	Worcester, MA
2/06/1940*	at Mass.-Lowell	L 39–40	1–1	Lowell, MA
2/17/1940*	at American Int'l	L 36–43	1–2	Springfield, MA
3/02/1940*	Assumption	W 44–29	2–2	Worcester, MA
3/05/1940*	Clark	L 36–39	2–3	Worcester, MA
*Non-conference game. (#) Tournament seedings in parentheses.
