= 1939–40 Cincinnati Bearcats men's basketball team =

American college basketball season

1939–40 Cincinnati Bearcats men's basketball
- Conference: Independent
- Record: 8–9
- Head coach: Clark Ballard (1st season)
- Captain: Ed Jucker
- Home arena: Schmidlapp Gymnasium

The 1939–40 Cincinnati Bearcats men's basketball team represented the University of Cincinnati during the 1939–40 NCAA men's basketball season. The head coach was Clark Ballard, coaching his first season with the Bearcats. The team finished with an overall record of 8–9.

== Schedule ==
Date time, TV	Opponent	Result	Record	Site city, state
December 6	at Notre Dame	L 17–54	0–1	Notre Dame Fieldhouse; Notre Dame, IN
December 9	Georgetown (KY)	W 39–18	1–1	Schmidlapp Gymnasium; Cincinnati, OH
December 13	at Hanover	L 41–57	1–2	Hanover, IN
December 16	at Kentucky	W 39–30	2–2	Alumni Gymnasium; Lexington, KY
December 20	Centre	W 42–30	3–2	Schmidlapp Gymnasium; Cincinnati, OH
December 22	Wilmington	W 40–36 ^{2OT}	4–2	Schmidlapp Gymnasium; Cincinnati, OH
January 6	at Toledo	L 35–42	4–3	The Field House; Toledo, OH
January 10	Miami (OH)	L 42–49	4–4	Schmidlapp Gymnasium; Cincinnati, OH
January 15	Alumni	L 38–41	4–5	Schmidlapp Gymnasium; Cincinnati, OH
January 20	Hanover	W 43–31	5–5	Schmidlapp Gymnasium; Cincinnati, OH
January 25	at Wilmington	W 38–37 ^{OT}	6–5	Wilmington, OH
January 30	at Akron	W 48–31	7–5	Akron Armory; Akron, OH
February 6	at Ohio	L 48–60	7–6	Men's Gymnasium; Athens, OH
February 10	at Dayton	L 36–42	7–7	Montgomery County Fairgrounds Coliseum; Dayton, OH
February 17	Dayton	W 41–31	8–7	Schmidlapp Gymnasium; Cincinnati, OH
February 24	Ohio	L 37–60	8–8	Schmidlapp Gymnasium; Cincinnati, OH
February 28	at Miami (OH)	L 31–42	8–9	Withrow Court; Oxford, OH
*Non-conference game. (#) Tournament seedings in parentheses.
