= 1939–40 Idaho Vandals men's basketball team =

American college basketball season

1939–40 Idaho Vandals men's basketball
- Conference: Pacific Coast Conference
- Record: 11–15 (3–13 PCC)
- Head coach: Forrest Twogood (4th season)
- Assistant coach: Walter Price
- Home arena: Memorial Gymnasium

1939–40 Pacific Coast Conference men's basketball standings
| | Conf. | | | | Overall |
| Team | W | | L | PCT | W | | L | PCT |
|---|---|---|---|---|---|---|---|---|
North
| Oregon State | 12 | – | 4 | .750 | 27 | – | 11 | .711 |
| Oregon | 10 | – | 6 | .625 | 19 | – | 12 | .613 |
| Washington State | 9 | – | 7 | .563 | 23 | – | 10 | .697 |
| Washington | 6 | – | 10 | .375 | 10 | – | 15 | .400 |
| Idaho | 3 | – | 13 | .188 | 11 | – | 15 | .423 |
South
| USC † | 10 | – | 2 | .833 | 20 | – | 3 | .870 |
| Stanford | 6 | – | 6 | .500 | 14 | – | 9 | .609 |
| California | 5 | – | 7 | .417 | 15 | – | 17 | .469 |
| UCLA | 3 | – | 9 | .250 | 8 | – | 17 | .320 |
† Conference playoff series winner

The 1939–40 Idaho Vandals men's basketball team represented the University of Idaho during the 1939–40 NCAA college basketball season. Members of the Pacific Coast Conference, the Vandals were led by fourth-year head coach Forrest Twogood and played their home games on campus at Memorial Gymnasium in Moscow, Idaho.

The Vandals were 11–15 overall and 3–13 in conference play.
