= 1939–40 La Salle Explorers men's basketball team =

American college basketball season

1939–40 La Salle Explorers men's basketball
- Conference: Independent
- Record: 12–8
- Head coach: Leonard Tanseer (7th season)
- Captain: Tom Carroll
- Home arena: Wister Hall

The 1939–40 La Salle Explorers men's basketball team represented La Salle University during the 1939–40 NCAA men's basketball season. The head coach was Leonard Tanseer, coaching the explorers in his seventh season. The team finished with an overall record of 12–8.

== Schedule ==
Date time, TV	Opponent	Result	Record	Site city, state
Dec 4, 1939	Wyomissing P.I.	W 53–44	1–0	Wister Hall; Philadelphia, PA
Dec. 6, 1939	Millersville	W 35–27	2–0	Wister Hall; Philadelphia, PA
Dec 8, 1939	Loyola (MD)	W 34–31	3–0	Wister Hall; Philadelphia, PA
Dec. 10, 1939	Scranton	W 41–23	4–0	Wister Hall; Philadelphia, PA
Dec. 12, 1939	at West Chester	W 37–21	5–0	West Chester, PA
Dec. 14, 1939	Washington College	W 46–33	6–0	Wister Hall; Philadelphia, PA
Dec. 18, 1939	Oklahoma A&M	L 16–33	6–1	Wister Hall; Philadelphia, PA
Dec. 22, 1939	Davis-Elkins	W 35–32	7–1	Wister Hall; Philadelphia, PA
Dec. 25, 1939	Santa Clara	L 29–54	7–2	Wister Hall; Philadelphia, PA
Dec. 28, 1939	Akron	W 33–30	8–2	Wister Hall; Philadelphia, PA
Jan. 5, 1939	Butler	L 37–46	8–3	Wister Hall; Philadelphia, PA
Jan. 17, 1940	Temple	L 37–39	8–4	Wister Hall; Philadelphia, PA
Jan. 27, 1940	St. Francis (NY)	W 35–32	9–4	Wister Hall; Philadelphia, PA
Feb. 3, 1940	Tulsa	L 36–46	9–5	Wister Hall; Philadelphia, PA
Feb. 6, 1940	at West Chester	L 27–30	9–6	West Chester, PA
Feb. 10, 1940	Duquesne	L 23–27 ^{ot}	9–7	Wister Hall; Philadelphia, PA
Feb. 16, 1940	Saint Joseph's	L 28–33	9–8	Wister Hall; Philadelphia, PA
Feb. 19, 1940	P.M.C.	W 50–31	10–8	Wister Hall; Philadelphia, PA
Feb. 25, 1940	Catholic	W 40–29	11–8	Wister Hall; Philadelphia, PA
Feb. 28, 1940	Long Island	W 46–33	12–8	Wister Hall; Philadelphia, PA
*Non-conference game. (#) Tournament seedings in parentheses.
