= 1939–40 Washington State Cougars men's basketball team =

American college basketball season

1939–40 Washington State Cougars men's basketball
- Conference: Pacific Coast Conference
- Record: 23–10 (9–7 PCC)
- Head coach: Jack Friel (12th season)
- Home arena: WSC Gymnasium

1939–40 Pacific Coast Conference men's basketball standings
	Conf.				Overall
Team	W		L	PCT	W		L	PCT
North
Oregon State	12	–	4	.750	27	–	11	.711
Oregon	10	–	6	.625	19	–	12	.613
Washington State	9	–	7	.563	23	–	10	.697
Washington	6	–	10	.375	10	–	15	.400
Idaho	3	–	13	.188	11	–	15	.423
South
USC †	10	–	2	.833	20	–	3	.870
Stanford	6	–	6	.500	14	–	9	.609
California	5	–	7	.417	15	–	17	.469
UCLA	3	–	9	.250	8	–	17	.320
† Conference playoff series winner

The 1939–40 Washington State Cougars men's basketball team represented Washington State College for the 1939–40 college basketball season. Led by twelfth-year head coach Jack Friel, the Cougars were members of the Pacific Coast Conference and played their home games on campus at WSC Gymnasium in Pullman, Washington.

The Cougars were 23–10 overall in the regular season and 9–7 in conference play, third place in Northern division.
