= 1939–40 USC Trojans men's basketball team =

American college basketball season

1939–40 USC Trojans men's basketball
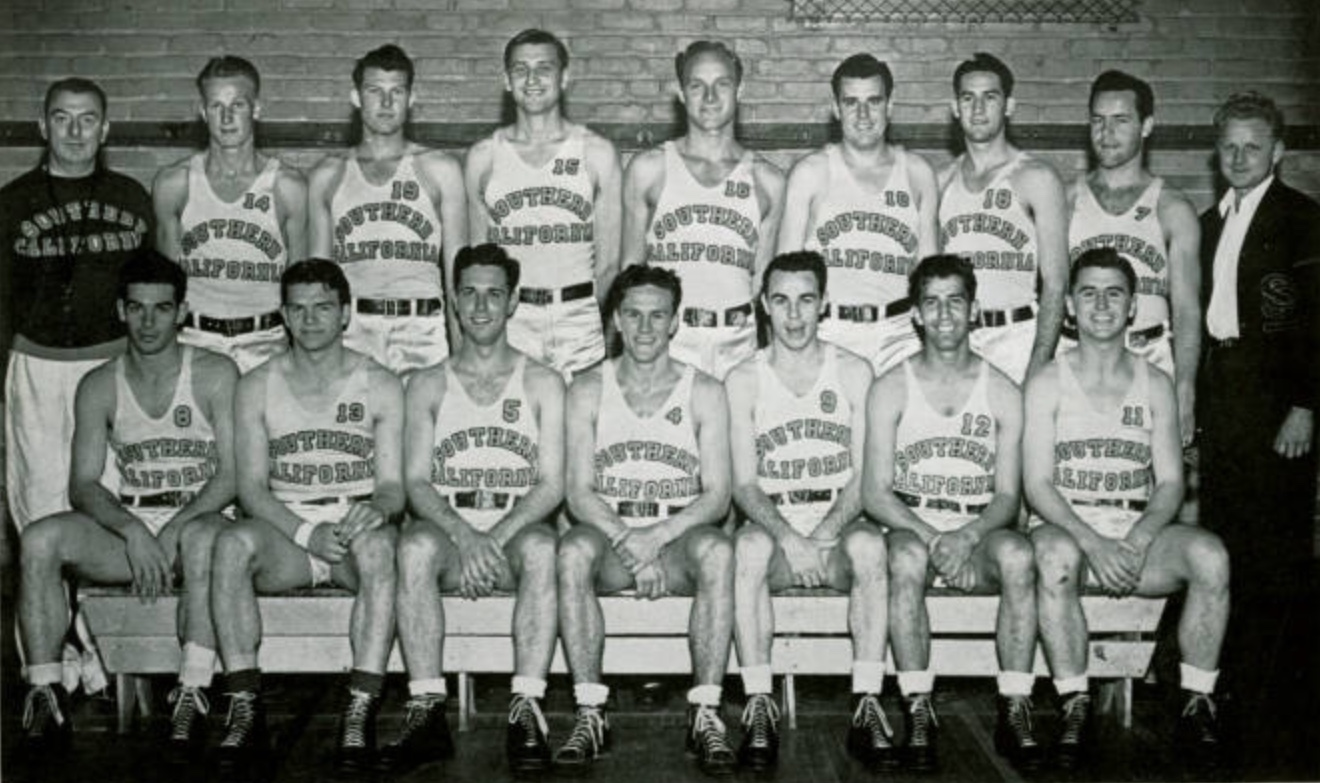

Helms Foundation National Champions PCC Champions

NCAA tournament, Final Four
- Conference: Pacific Coast Conference
- South
- Record: 20–3 (10–2 PCC)
- Head coach: Sam Barry (11th season)
- MVP: Tom McGarvin
- Captain: None
- Home arena: Shrine Auditorium

1939–40 Pacific Coast Conference men's basketball standings
	Conf.				Overall
Team	W		L	PCT	W		L	PCT
North
Oregon State	12	–	4	.750	27	–	11	.711
Oregon	10	–	6	.625	19	–	12	.613
Washington State	9	–	7	.563	23	–	10	.697
Washington	6	–	10	.375	10	–	15	.400
Idaho	3	–	13	.188	11	–	15	.423
South
USC †	10	–	2	.833	20	–	3	.870
Stanford	6	–	6	.500	14	–	9	.609
California	5	–	7	.417	15	–	17	.469
UCLA	3	–	9	.250	8	–	17	.320
† Conference playoff series winner

The 1939–40 USC Trojans men's basketball team represented the University of Southern California during the 1939–40 NCAA men's basketball season in the United States. Their head coach was Sam Barry, coaching in his 11th season with the Trojans. The Trojans played their home games in the Shrine Auditorium in Los Angeles, California as members of the South division of the Pacific Coast Conference. The team finished the season 20–3, 10–2 in PCC play to win the South division. They swept North division champion Oregon State in the best of three series to win the PCC championship. USC was invited to the NCAA tournament where they defeated Colorado before losing to Kansas in the Final Four. Despite the loss, they were named national champions by the Helms Athletic Foundation.

Forward Ralph Vaughn was named an All-American at the end of the season.

== Schedule and results ==
Date time, TV	Rank^{#}	Opponent^{#}	Result	Record	Site city, state
Non-conference regular season
Dec 18, 1939*		at DePaul	W 44–42 ^{OT}	1–0	Chicago, IL
Dec 20, 1939*		at Purdue	W 38–34	2–0	Lambert Fieldhouse; West Lafayette, IN
Dec 22, 1939*		at Notre Dame	W 55–38	3–0	ND Fieldhouse; South Bend, IN
Dec 26, 1939*		at Long Island	W 57–49	4–0	Brooklyn, NY
Dec 27, 1939*		at Temple	W 46–30	5–0	Convention Hall; Philadelphia, PA
Jan 5, 1940*		Loyola Marymount	W 43–33	6–0	Shrine Auditorium; Los Angeles, CA
Jan 6, 1940*		Saint Mary's	W 59–23	7–0	Shrine Auditorium; Los Angeles, CA
PCC regular season
Jan 12, 1940		California	W 49–36	8–0 (1–0)	Shrine Auditorium; Los Angeles, CA
Jan 13, 1940		California	W 56–49	9–0 (2–0)	Shrine Auditorium; Los Angeles, CA
Jan 19, 1940		UCLA; Rivalry	W 50–32	10–0 (3–0)	Shrine Auditorium; Los Angeles, CA
Jan 26, 1940		Stanford	W 51–48	11–0 (4–0)	Shrine Auditorium; Los Angeles, CA
Jan 27, 1940		Stanford	W 53–36	12–0 (5–0)	Shrine Auditorium; Los Angeles, CA
Feb 9, 1940		UCLA; Rivalry	W 60–26	13–0 (6–0)	Shrine Auditorium; Los Angeles, CA
Feb 16, 1940		at California	L 30–38	13–1 (6–1)	Haas Pavilion; Berkeley, CA
Feb 17, 1940		at California	W 49–33	14–1 (7–1)	Haas Pavilion; Berkeley, CA
Feb 23, 1940		at Stanford	L 45–46	14–2 (7–2)	Stanford Pavilion; Stanford, CA
Feb 24, 1940		at Stanford	W 39–32	15–2 (8–2)	Stanford Pavilion; Stanford, CA
Mar 1, 1940		at UCLA; Rivalry	W 32–26	16–2 (9–2)	Men's Gym; Los Angeles, CA
Mar 2, 1940		at UCLA; Rivalry	W 47–35	17–2 (10–2)	Men's Gym; Los Angeles, CA
PCC Divisional playoff
Mar 8, 1940*		Oregon State; Game 1	W 54–41	18–2	Shrine Auditorium; Los Angeles, CA
Mar 9, 1940*		Oregon State; Game 2	W 62–25	19–2	Shrine Auditorium; Los Angeles, CA
NCAA tournament
Mar 22, 1940*		vs. Colorado; NCAA Quarterfinals	W 38–32	20–2	Municipal Auditorium; Kansas City, MO
Mar 23, 1940*		vs. Kansas; NCAA Semifinals	L 42–43	20–3	Municipal Auditorium; Kansas City, MO
*Non-conference game. ^{#}Rankings from AP Poll. (#) Tournament seedings in parentheses.
