= 1953–54 NCAA men's basketball season =

Men's university basketball season

- Preseason AP No. 1: Indiana Hoosiers
- NCAA Tournament: 1954
- Tournament dates: March 8 – 20, 1954
- National Championship: Municipal Auditorium; Kansas City, Missouri
- NCAA Champions: La Salle Explorers
- Helms National Champions: Kentucky Wildcats
- Other champions: Holy Cross Crusaders (NIT)
- Player of the Year (Helms): Tom Gola, La Salle Explorers

The 1953–54 NCAA men's basketball season began in December 1953, progressed through the regular season and conference tournaments, and concluded with the 1954 NCAA basketball tournament championship game on March 20, 1954, at Municipal Auditorium in Kansas City, Missouri. The La Salle Explorers won their first NCAA national championship with a 92–76 victory over the Bradley Braves.

== Season headlines ==
- The Atlantic Coast Conference began play, with eight original members.
- Frank Selvy of Furman scored 100 points in a 149–95 victory over Newberry in Greenville, South Carolina, on February 13, 1954, becoming the first player to score 100 or more points in a game. Selvy finished the season with 1,209 points for the year, the first player to score 1,000 or more points in a single season. He also averaged 41.7 points per game for the season, the first player to average 40 or more points per game in a season, and finished his career (1952–1954) averaging 32.5 points a game, the first player to average 30 or more points per game during a collegiate career.
- The NCAA tournament expanded from 22 to 24 teams.
- Kentucky went undefeated, finishing with a 25–0 record. The Helms Athletic Foundation awarded its national championship to Kentucky rather than to the 1954 NCAA basketball tournament champion, La Salle. It was the fourth and final time that the NCAA champion and the Helms champion differed. In the final AP Poll, taken after the completion of the 1954 NCAA basketball tournament and the then-prestigious National Invitation Tournament, Kentucky was ranked No. 1 ahead of No. 2 La Salle (NCAA tournament champion) and No. 3 Holy Cross (1954 National Invitation Tournament champion).
- The NCAA tournament's Final Four games were played on Friday and Saturday for the first time.
- The NCAA tournament's championship game was televised nationally for the first time. The broadcast rights fee was $7,500.

== Season outlook ==
=== Pre-season polls ===
The Top 20 from the AP Poll and the UP Coaches Poll during the pre-season.

Associated Press
Ranking	Team
1	Indiana
2	Kentucky
3	Duquesne
4	Oklahoma A&M
5	Kansas
6	La Salle
7	NC State
8	Kansas State
9	Illinois
10	LSU
11	Western Kentucky State
12	Minnesota
13	Oregon State
14	Wyoming
15	Dayton
16	Santa Clara
17	California
18	Saint Louis
19 (tie)	Holy Cross
19 (tie)	Oklahoma City

UP Coaches
Ranking	Team
1	Indiana
2	Kentucky
3	Duquesne
4	Kansas
5	Oklahoma A&M
6	La Salle
7	LSU
8	NC State
9	Minnesota
10	California
11	Illinois
12	Kansas State
13	Saint Louis
14	Holy Cross
15	Oregon State
16	Dayton
17	Wyoming
18	Santa Clara
19	Notre Dame
20	UCLA

== Conference membership changes ==
School	Former conference	New conference
Arizona State College-Flagstaff Lumberjacks	Border Conference	Non-major basketball program
Bowling Green State Falcons	Independent	Mid-American Conference
Brown Bears	Independent	Eastern Intercollegiate Basketball League
CCNY Beavers	Metropolitan New York Conference	Non-major basketball program
Cincinnati Bearcats	Mid-American Conference	Independent
Clemson Tigers	Southern Conference	Atlantic Coast Conference
Duke Blue Devils	Southern Conference	Atlantic Coast Conference
Marshall Thundering Herd	Independent	Mid-American Conference
Maryland Terrapins	Southern Conference	Atlantic Coast Conference
North Carolina Tar Heels	Southern Conference	Atlantic Coast Conference
North Carolina State Wolfpack	Southern Conference	Atlantic Coast Conference
South Carolina Gamecocks	Southern Conference	Atlantic Coast Conference
Wake Forest Demon Deacons	Southern Conference	Atlantic Coast Conference
Virginia Cavaliers	Independent	Atlantic Coast Conference

== Regular season ==
=== Conferences ===
==== Conference winners and tournaments ====
Conference	Regular season winner	Conference player of the year	Conference tournament	Tournament venue (City)	Tournament winner
Atlantic Coast Conference	Duke	Dickie Hemric, Wake Forest	1954 ACC men's basketball tournament	Reynolds Coliseum (Raleigh, North Carolina)	NC State
Big Seven Conference	Colorado & Kansas	None selected	No Tournament		
Big Ten Conference	Indiana	None selected	No Tournament		
Border Conference	Texas Tech		No Tournament		
California Basketball Association	Santa Clara	None selected	No Tournament		
Eastern Intercollegiate Basketball League	Cornell	None selected	No Tournament		
Metropolitan New York Conference	St. Francis (NY)		No Tournament		
Mid-American Conference	Toledo	None selected	No Tournament		
Missouri Valley Conference	Oklahoma A&M	None selected	No Tournament		
Mountain States (Skyline) Conference	Colorado A&M		No Tournament		
Ohio Valley Conference	Western Kentucky State	None selected	1954 Ohio Valley Conference men's basketball tournament	Jefferson County Armory (Louisville, Kentucky)	Western Kentucky State
Pacific Coast Conference	Oregon State (North); USC (South)		No Tournament; USC defeated Oregon State in best-of-three conference championship playoff series		
Southeastern Conference	Kentucky & LSU	None selected	No Tournament		
Southern Conference	George Washington	Frank Selvy, Furman	1954 Southern Conference men's basketball tournament	WVU Fieldhouse (Morgantown, West Virginia)	George Washington
Southwest Conference	Rice & Texas	None selected	No Tournament		
Western New York Little Three Conference	Niagara		No Tournament		
Yankee Conference	Connecticut	None selected	No Tournament		

==== Conference standings ====
1953–54 ACC men's basketball standings
	Conf.				Overall
Team	W		L	PCT	W		L	PCT
No. 15 Duke	9	–	1	.900	21	–	6	.778
No. 20 Maryland	7	–	2	.778	23	–	7	.767
Wake Forest	8	–	4	.667	17	–	12	.586
NC State †	5	–	3	.625	26	–	7	.788
North Carolina	5	–	6	.455	11	–	10	.524
South Carolina	2	–	8	.200	10	–	16	.385
Virginia	1	–	4	.200	16	–	11	.593
Clemson	0	–	9	.000	5	–	18	.217
† 1954 ACC tournament winner Rankings from AP Poll

1953–54 Big Seven Conference men's basketball standings
	Conf.				Overall
Team	W		L	PCT	W		L	PCT
No. 18 Kansas	10	–	2	.833	16	–	5	.762
Colorado	10	–	2	.833	11	–	11	.500
Missouri	6	–	6	.500	11	–	10	.524
Kansas State	5	–	7	.417	11	–	10	.524
Nebraska	5	–	7	.417	8	–	13	.381
Oklahoma	4	–	8	.333	8	–	13	.381
Iowa State	2	–	10	.167	6	–	15	.286
Rankings from AP Poll

1953–54 Big Ten Conference men's basketball standings
	Conf.				Overall
Team	W		L	PCT	W		L	PCT
No. 4 Indiana	12	–	2	.857	20	–	4	.833
No. 13 Iowa	11	–	3	.786	17	–	5	.773
No. 19 Illinois	10	–	4	.714	17	–	5	.773
Minnesota	10	–	4	.714	17	–	5	.773
Wisconsin	6	–	8	.429	12	–	10	.545
Northwestern	6	–	8	.429	9	–	13	.409
Ohio State	5	–	9	.357	11	–	11	.500
Michigan State	4	–	10	.286	9	–	13	.409
Michigan	3	–	11	.214	9	–	13	.409
Purdue	3	–	11	.214	9	–	13	.409
Rankings from AP Poll

1953–54 Border Conference men's basketball standings
	Conf.				Overall
Team	W		L	PCT	W		L	PCT
Texas Tech	11	–	1	.917	20	–	5	.800
West Texas State	9	–	3	.750	13	–	7	.650
Arizona	8	–	4	.667	14	–	10	.583
Texas Western	4	–	8	.333	8	–	14	.364
Hardin–Simmons	4	–	8	.333	7	–	17	.292
New Mexico A&M	3	–	9	.250	6	–	12	.333
Arizona State–Tempe	3	–	9	.250	5	–	18	.217
† Regular-season co-championship winner Rankings from AP Poll

1953–54 California Basketball Association men's basketball standings
	Conf.				Overall
Team	W		L	PCT	W		L	PCT
Santa Clara	9	–	3	.750	20	–	7	.741
San Francisco	8	–	4	.667	14	–	7	.667
San Jose State	6	–	6	.500	12	–	15	.444
Saint Mary's	4	–	8	.333	10	–	14	.417
Pacific	3	–	9	.250	9	–	17	.346
Rankings from AP Poll

1953–54 Eastern Intercollegiate Basketball League standings
	Conf.				Overall
Team	W		L	PCT	W		L	PCT
Cornell†	11	–	3	.786	17	–	7	.708
Princeton	11	–	3	.786	16	–	9	.640
Pennsylvania	10	–	4	.714	17	–	8	.680
Yale	7	–	7	.500	12	–	14	.462
Columbia	6	–	8	.429	11	–	13	.458
Dartmouth	5	–	9	.357	13	–	13	.500
Brown	4	–	10	.286	13	–	11	.542
Harvard	2	–	12	.143	9	–	16	.360
† Regular-season championship winner Rankings from AP Poll

1953–54 Metropolitan New York Conference men's basketball standings
	Conf.				Overall
Team	W		L	PCT	W		L	PCT
St. Francis (NY)	5	–	0	1.000	23	–	5	.821
Fordham	3	–	1	.750	18	–	6	.750
Manhattan	3	–	3	.500	15	–	11	.577
NYU	2	–	2	.500	9	–	9	.500
St. John's	2	–	3	.400	9	–	11	.450
CCNY	2	–	4	.333	10	–	8	.556
Brooklyn	0	–	4	.000	6	–	11	.353
Rankings from AP Poll

1953–54 Mid-American Conference men's basketball standings
	Conf.				Overall
Team	W		L	PCT	W		L	PCT
Toledo	10	–	2	.833	13	–	10	.565
Bowling Green	10	–	3	.769	17	–	7	.708
Miami (Ohio)	7	–	5	.583	12	–	10	.545
Marshall	6	–	7	.462	12	–	9	.571
Western Michigan	4	–	5	.444	10	–	11	.476
Ohio	5	–	7	.417	12	–	10	.545
Kent State	3	–	9	.250	8	–	13	.381
Western Reserve	2	–	9	.182	7	–	17	.292
Rankings from AP Poll

1953–54 Missouri Valley Conference men's basketball standings
	Conf.				Overall
Team	W		L	PCT	W		L	PCT
No. 10 Oklahoma A&M	9	–	1	.900	24	–	5	.828
Wichita Municipal	8	–	2	.800	27	–	4	.871
Tulsa	5	–	5	.500	15	–	4	.789
Saint Louis	4	–	6	.400	14	–	12	.538
Houston	3	–	7	.300	11	–	15	.423
Detroit	1	–	9	.100	11	–	17	.393
Rankings from AP Poll

1953–54 Mountain States Conference men's basketball standings
	Conf.				Overall
Team	W		L	PCT	W		L	PCT
Colorado A&M	12	–	2	.857	22	–	7	.759
Wyoming	10	–	4	.714	19	–	9	.679
BYU	9	–	5	.643	18	–	11	.621
Utah State	7	–	7	.500	14	–	13	.519
Utah	7	–	7	.500	12	–	14	.462
New Mexico	5	–	9	.357	11	–	11	.500
Montana	3	–	11	.214	7	–	20	.259
Denver	3	–	11	.214	6	–	21	.222
Rankings from AP Poll

1953–54 Ohio Valley Conference men's basketball standings
	Conf.				Overall
Team	W		L	PCT	W		L	PCT
No. 8 Western Kentucky State†	9	–	1	.900	29	–	3	.906
Murray State	6	–	4	.600	15	–	16	.484
Morehead State		–		–	16	–	7	.696
Eastern Kentucky State	4	–	6	.400	7	–	16	.304
Tennessee Tech		–		–	12	–	10	.545
Middle Tennessee		–		–	12	–	17	.414
† Ohio Valley Conference Tournament winner Rankings from AP Poll

1953–54 Pacific Coast Conference men's basketball standings
	Conf.				Overall
Team	W		L	PCT	W		L	PCT
North
Oregon State	11	–	5	.688	22	–	8	.733
Idaho	9	–	7	.563	15	–	8	.652
Oregon	9	–	7	.563	17	–	10	.630
Washington	7	–	9	.438	8	–	18	.308
Washington State	4	–	12	.250	10	–	17	.370
South
No. 11 USC †	8	–	4	.667	19	–	14	.576
UCLA	7	–	5	.583	18	–	7	.720
California	6	–	6	.500	17	–	7	.708
Stanford	3	–	9	.250	15	–	10	.600
† Conference playoff series winner Rankings from AP Poll

1953–54 Rocky Mountain Conference men's basketball standings
	Conf.				Overall
Team	W		L	PCT	W		L	PCT
Idaho State	9	–	1	.900	22	–	5	.815
Montana State	8	–	2	.800	18	–	11	.621
Colorado State–Greeley	6	–	4	.600	12	–	11	.522
Western State (CO)	4	–	6	.400	11	–	13	.458
Colorado Mines	2	–	8	.200	6	–	14	.300
Colorado College	1	–	9	.100	6	–	13	.316

1953–54 Southeastern Conference men's basketball standings
	Conf.				Overall
Team	W		L	PCT	W		L	PCT
No. 1 Kentucky	14	–	0	1.000	25	–	0	1.000
No. 14 LSU	14	–	0	1.000	20	–	5	.800
Alabama	10	–	4	.714	16	–	8	.667
Tulane	10	–	4	.714	15	–	8	.652
Auburn	8	–	6	.571	16	–	8	.667
Ole Miss	7	–	7	.500	12	–	12	.500
Tennessee	7	–	7	.500	11	–	12	.478
Vanderbilt	5	–	9	.357	12	–	10	.545
Mississippi State	5	–	9	.357	11	–	10	.524
Florida	3	–	11	.214	7	–	15	.318
Georgia	2	–	12	.143	7	–	18	.280
Georgia Tech	0	–	14	.000	2	–	22	.083
Rankings from AP Poll

1953–54 Southern Conference men's basketball standings
	Conf.				Overall
Team	W		L	PCT	W		L	PCT
No. 12 George Washington †	10	–	0	1.000	23	–	3	.885
Furman	6	–	1	.857	23	–	9	.719
Richmond	10	–	3	.769	23	–	8	.742
West Virginia	6	–	4	.600	12	–	11	.522
William & Mary	6	–	5	.545	9	–	14	.391
VMI	6	–	7	.462	11	–	12	.478
Davidson	3	–	5	.375	7	–	15	.318
Washington and Lee	3	–	9	.250	6	–	17	.261
Virginia Tech	3	–	13	.188	3	–	24	.111
The Citadel	1	–	7	.125	2	–	17	.105
† Southern Conference Tournament winner Rankings from AP Poll

1953–54 Southwest Conference men's basketball standings
	Conf.				Overall
Team	W		L	PCT	W		L	PCT
Rice	9	–	3	.750	23	–	5	.821
Texas	9	–	3	.750	16	–	9	.640
Arkansas	6	–	6	.500	13	–	9	.591
SMU	6	–	6	.500	13	–	9	.591
Baylor	6	–	6	.500	12	–	11	.522
TCU	5	–	7	.417	10	–	14	.417
Texas A&M	1	–	11	.083	2	–	20	.091
Rankings from AP Poll

1953–54 Western New York Little Three Conference men's basketball standings
	Conf.				Overall
Team	W		L	PCT	W		L	PCT
No. 16 Niagara	3	–	1	.750	24	–	6	.800
St. Bonaventure	2	–	2	.500	12	–	11	.522
Canisius	1	–	3	.250	9	–	14	.391
Rankings from AP Poll

1953–54 Yankee Conference men's basketball standings
	Conf.				Overall
Team	W		L	PCT	W		L	PCT
Connecticut	7	–	0	1.000	23	–	3	.885
Massachusetts	5	–	1	.833	13	–	9	.591
Rhode Island	4	–	4	.500	7	–	14	.333
New Hampshire	2	–	6	.250	8	–	10	.444
Vermont	1	–	2	.333	13	–	7	.650
Maine	1	–	7	.125	6	–	12	.333

=== Major independents ===
A total of 42 college teams played as major independents. Among them, Holy Cross (26–2) and Seattle (26–2) had the best winning percentage (.929), and Holy Cross, Seattle, Duquesne (26–3), and La Salle (26–4) finished with the most wins.

1953–54 NCAA men's basketball independents standings
	Conf.				Overall
Team	W		L	PCT	W		L	PCT
No. 3 Holy Cross		–		–	26	–	2	.929
No. 17 Seattle		–		–	26	–	2	.929
No. 5 Duquesne		–		–	26	–	3	.897
No. 6 Notre Dame		–		–	22	–	3	.880
No. 2 La Salle		–		–	26	–	4	.867
Dayton		–		–	25	–	7	.781
Louisville		–		–	22	–	7	.759
No. 9 Penn State		–		–	18	–	6	.750
Oklahoma City		–		–	18	–	7	.720
Navy		–		–	18	–	8	.692
Army		–		–	15	–	7	.682
Villanova		–		–	20	–	11	.645
Lafayette		–		–	17	–	10	.630
Saint Joseph's		–		–	14	–	9	.609
Xavier		–		–	18	–	12	.600
No. 7 Bradley		–		–	19	–	13	.594
John Carroll		–		–	15	–	11	.577
Seton Hall		–		–	13	–	10	.565
Temple		–		–	15	–	12	.556
Muhlenberg		–		–	12	–	10	.545
Washington University		–		–	12	–	10	.545
Syracuse		–		–	10	–	9	.526
Cincinnati		–		–	11	–	10	.524
DePaul		–		–	11	–	10	.524
Iona		–		–	11	–	10	.524
Butler		–		–	13	–	12	.520
Boston College		–		–	11	–	11	.500
Loyola (Calif.)		–		–	14	–	16	.467
Rutgers		–		–	11	–	13	.458
Creighton		–		–	14	–	17	.452
Gonzaga		–		–	12	–	15	.444
Valparaiso		–		–	10	–	13	.435
Marquette		–		–	11	–	15	.423
Lehigh		–		–	8	–	12	.400
Pittsburgh		–		–	9	–	14	.391
Georgetown		–		–	11	–	18	.379
Siena		–		–	7	–	14	.333
Portland		–		–	9	–	19	.321
Loyola (IL)		–		–	7	–	15	.318
Drake		–		–	7	–	16	.304
Colgate		–		–	5	–	12	.294
Bucknell		–		–	4	–	16	.200
Rankings from AP Poll

== Post-season tournaments ==
=== NCAA tournament ===
==== Final Four ====
National semifinals
Penn State	54
La Salle	69
Bradley	74
USC	72

National finals
La Salle	92
Bradley	76
Third place
Penn State	70
USC	61

=== National Invitation tournament ===
==== Semifinals & finals ====
Semifinals
Western Kentucky State	69
Holy Cross	75
Duquesne	66
Niagara	51

Finals
Holy Cross	71
Duquesne	62
Third place
Western Kentucky State	66
Niagara	71

== Awards ==
=== Consensus All-American teams ===
Consensus First Team
Player	Position	Class	Team
Tom Gola	F	Junior	La Salle
Cliff Hagan	F	Senior	Kentucky
Bob Pettit	C	Senior	Louisiana State
Don Schlundt	C	Junior	Indiana
Frank Selvy	G	Senior	Furman

Consensus Second Team
Player	Position	Class	Team
Bobby Leonard	G	Senior	Indiana
Tom Marshall	F	Senior	Western Kentucky State
Bob Mattick	C	Senior	Oklahoma A&M
Frank Ramsey	G/F	Senior	Kentucky
Dick Ricketts	F/C	Junior	Duquesne

=== Major player of the year awards ===
- Helms Player of the Year: Tom Gola, La Salle

=== Other major awards ===
- NIT/Haggerty Award (Top player in New York City metro area): Ed Conlin, Fordham

== Coaching changes ==
A number of teams changed coaches during the season and after it ended.

Team	Former Coach	Interim Coach	New Coach	Reason
Army	Bob Vanatta		Orvis Sigler	Vanatta left to coach Bradley.
Bradley	Forddy Anderson		Bob Vanatta	Anderson left to coach Michigan State.
Brown	Robert Morris		L. Stanley Ward	
California	Nibs Price		Pete Newell	
The Citadel	Leo Zack		Jim Browning	
Colorado A&M	Bill Strannigan		Jim Williams	Strannigan left to coach Iowa State.
Harvard	Norman Shepard		Floyd Wilson	
Idaho	Charles Finley		Harlan Hodges	
Iowa State	Clay Sutherland		Bill Strannigan	
John Carroll	Fred George		Silvio Cornachione	
Maine	Rome Rankin		Russell DeVette	
Miami	Dave Wike		Bruce Hale	
Michigan State	Pete Newell		Forddy Anderson	Newell left to Coach California.
Montana State	Brick Breeden		Wally Lemm	
Murray State	Harlan Hodges		Rex Alexander	
Nebraska	Harry Good		Jerry Bush	
Pennsylvania	Howie Dallmar		Ray Stanley	Dallmar left to coach Stanford.
Penn State	Elmer Gross		John Egli	
Portland	Mush Torson		Art McLarney	
Stanford	Bob Burnett		Howie Dallmar	
Toledo	Jerry Bush		Ed Melvin	Bush left to coach Nebraska.
West Virginia	Red Brown		Fred Schaus	
