= 1953–54 Georgia Bulldogs basketball team =

American college basketball season

1953–54 Georgia Bulldogs basketball
- Conference: Southeastern Conference
- Record: 7–18 (2–12 SEC)
- Head coach: Harbin Lawson (3rd season)
- Captain: Marvin Satterfield
- Home arena: Woodruff Hall

1953–54 Southeastern Conference men's basketball standings
| | Conf. | | | | Overall |
| Team | W | | L | PCT | W | | L | PCT |
|---|---|---|---|---|---|---|---|---|
| No. 1 Kentucky | 14 | – | 0 | 1.000 | 25 | – | 0 | 1.000 |
| No. 14 LSU | 14 | – | 0 | 1.000 | 20 | – | 5 | .800 |
| Alabama | 10 | – | 4 | .714 | 16 | – | 8 | .667 |
| Tulane | 10 | – | 4 | .714 | 15 | – | 8 | .652 |
| Auburn | 8 | – | 6 | .571 | 16 | – | 8 | .667 |
| Ole Miss | 7 | – | 7 | .500 | 12 | – | 12 | .500 |
| Tennessee | 7 | – | 7 | .500 | 11 | – | 12 | .478 |
| Vanderbilt | 5 | – | 9 | .357 | 12 | – | 10 | .545 |
| Mississippi State | 5 | – | 9 | .357 | 11 | – | 10 | .524 |
| Florida | 3 | – | 11 | .214 | 7 | – | 15 | .318 |
| Georgia | 2 | – | 12 | .143 | 7 | – | 18 | .280 |
| Georgia Tech | 0 | – | 14 | .000 | 2 | – | 22 | .083 |
Rankings from AP Poll

The 1953–54 Georgia Bulldogs basketball team represented the University of Georgia as a member of the Southeastern Conference (SEC) during the 1953–54 NCAA men's basketball season. Led by third-year head coach Harbin Lawson, the Bulldogs compiled an overall record of 7–18 with a mark of 2–12 conference play, placing 11th in the SEC. The team captain was Marvin Satterfield.

== Roster ==
1953–54 Georgia Bulldogs men's basketball team
Players
Coaches

| Pos. | # | Name | Height | Weight | Year | Previous school | Hometown |
|---|---|---|---|---|---|---|---|
| G | | Murphy McManus | 6 ft 0 in (1.83 m) | — | Jr |
| F | | Bill Ensley | 6 ft 5 in (1.96 m) | — | Fr |
| C | | Al Parrish | 6 ft 6 in (1.98 m) | — | Jr |
| G | | Fred Edmondson | 6 ft 0 in (1.83 m) | — | Fr |
| | | Jimmy Parker | 6 ft 1 in (1.85 m) | — |
| F | | Lamar Potts | 6 ft 4 in (1.93 m) | — | Jr |
| | | Marvin Satterfield | 6 ft 2 in (1.88 m) | — |
| | | Louis McGee | 5 ft 10 in (1.78 m) | — |
| F | | Doug Foster | 6 ft 1 in (1.85 m) | — | Jr |
| | | Emory Clements | 6 ft 0 in (1.83 m) | — |
| G | | W.C. Jones | 6 ft 0 in (1.83 m) | — |
| F | | George Bell | 6 ft 3 in (1.91 m) | — | So |
| F | | Ronald Bradley | 6 ft 0 in (1.83 m) | — | So |

Head coach

Harbin Lawson

Assistant coach(es)

Legend

- (C) Team captain
- (S) Suspended
- (I) Ineligible
- (W) Walk-on
- Injured
- Current redshirt

== Schedule ==
| Date time, TV | Opponent | Result | Record | Site city, state |
|---|---|---|---|---|
| 12/4/1953 | South Carolina | L 59-61 | 0–1 | Athens, GA |
| 12/5/1953 | at Clemson | W 71-63 | 1–1 | |
| 12/12/1953 | Clemson | W 77-51 | 2–1 | Athens, GA |
| 12/18/1953 | Auburn | L 73-75 | 2–2 | Athens, GA |
| 12/19/1953 | Ole Miss | L 73-87 | 2–3 | Athens, GA |
| 12/28/1953 | Georgia Tech | W 66-64 | 3–3 | Athens, GA |
| 12/29/1953 | Florida | W 84-72 | 4–3 | Athens, GA |
| 12/30/1953 | Georgia Teachers | W 80-69 | 5–3 | Athens, GA |
| 1/2/1954 | at Florida | L 64-76 | 5–4 | |
| 1/6/1954 | Tennessee | W 71-69 | 6–4 | Athens, GA |
| 1/8/1954 | at LSU | L 62-97 | 6–5 | |
| 1/9/1954 | at LSU | L 53-100 | 6–6 | |
| 1/11/1954 | Tulane | L 78-93 | 6–7 | Athens, GA |
| 1/23/1954 | Auburn | L 66-81 | 6–8 | Athens, GA |
| 1/30/1954 | Alabama | L 70-76 | 6–9 | Athens, GA |
| 2/4/1954 | at Kentucky | L 55-106 | 6–10 | |
| 2/6/1954 | Kentucky | L 68-100 | 6–11 | Athens, GA |
| 2/13/1954 | at Alabama | L 76-112 | 6–12 | |
| 2/15/1954 | at Auburn | L 61-80 | 6–13 | |
| 2/17/1954 | Georgia Tech | W 69-61 | 7–13 | Athens, GA |
| 2/20/1954 | Mississippi | L 66-80 | 7–14 | Athens, GA |
| 2/22/1954 | at Mississippi State | L 60-75 | 7–15 | |
| 2/27/1954 | at Georgia Tech | L 63-80 | 7–16 | |
| 3/1/1954 | Vanderbilt | L 67-83 | 7–17 | Athens, GA |
| 3/6/1954 | Florida | L 76-80 | 7–18 | Athens, GA |
*Non-conference game. (#) Tournament seedings in parentheses.
