= 1953–54 Washington Huskies men's basketball team =

American college basketball season

1953–54 Washington Huskies men's basketball
- Conference: Pacific Coast Conference
- Record: 8–18 (7–9 PCC)
- Head coach: Tippy Dye (4th season)
- Home arena: Hec Edmundson Pavilion

1953–54 Pacific Coast Conference men's basketball standings
	Conf.				Overall
Team	W		L	PCT	W		L	PCT
North
Oregon State	11	–	5	.688	22	–	8	.733
Idaho	9	–	7	.563	15	–	8	.652
Oregon	9	–	7	.563	17	–	10	.630
Washington	7	–	9	.438	8	–	18	.308
Washington State	4	–	12	.250	10	–	17	.370
South
No. 11 USC †	8	–	4	.667	19	–	14	.576
UCLA	7	–	5	.583	18	–	7	.720
California	6	–	6	.500	17	–	7	.708
Stanford	3	–	9	.250	15	–	10	.600
† Conference playoff series winner Rankings from AP Poll

The 1953–54 Washington Huskies men's basketball team represented the University of Washington for the 1953–54 NCAA college basketball season. Led by fourth-year head coach Tippy Dye, the Huskies were members of the Pacific Coast Conference and played their home games on campus at Hec Edmundson Pavilion in Seattle, Washington.

The Huskies were 8–18 overall in the regular season and 7–9 in conference play, fourth place in the Northern division. They swept the last two games of the season over rival Washington State.
