= 1953–54 Washington State Cougars men's basketball team =

American college basketball season

1953–54 Washington State Cougars men's basketball
- Conference: Pacific Coast Conference
- Record: 10–17 (4–12 PCC)
- Head coach: Jack Friel (26th season)
- Home arena: Bohler Gymnasium

1953–54 Pacific Coast Conference men's basketball standings
	Conf.				Overall
Team	W		L	PCT	W		L	PCT
North
Oregon State	11	–	5	.688	22	–	8	.733
Idaho	9	–	7	.563	15	–	8	.652
Oregon	9	–	7	.563	17	–	10	.630
Washington	7	–	9	.438	8	–	18	.308
Washington State	4	–	12	.250	10	–	17	.370
South
No. 11 USC †	8	–	4	.667	19	–	14	.576
UCLA	7	–	5	.583	18	–	7	.720
California	6	–	6	.500	17	–	7	.708
Stanford	3	–	9	.250	15	–	10	.600
† Conference playoff series winner Rankings from AP Poll

The 1953–54 Washington State Cougars men's basketball team represented Washington State College for the 1953–54 NCAA college basketball season. Led by 26th-year head coach Jack Friel, the Cougars were members of the Pacific Coast Conference and played their home games on campus at Bohler Gymnasium in Pullman, Washington.

The Cougars were 10–17 overall in the regular season and 4–12 in conference play, last in the Northern division. They were swept in the last two games of the season by rival Washington.
