= 1953–54 Iowa State Cyclones men's basketball team =

American college basketball season

1953–54 Iowa State Cyclones men's basketball
- Conference: Big Seven Conference
- Record: 6–15 (2–10 Big Seven)
- Head coach: Clay Sutherland (7th season)
- Home arena: Iowa State Armory

1953–54 Big Seven Conference men's basketball standings
	Conf.				Overall
Team	W		L	PCT	W		L	PCT
No. 18 Kansas	10	–	2	.833	16	–	5	.762
Colorado	10	–	2	.833	11	–	11	.500
Missouri	6	–	6	.500	11	–	10	.524
Kansas State	5	–	7	.417	11	–	10	.524
Nebraska	5	–	7	.417	8	–	13	.381
Oklahoma	4	–	8	.333	8	–	13	.381
Iowa State	2	–	10	.167	6	–	15	.286
Rankings from AP Poll

The 1953–54 Iowa State Cyclones men's basketball team represented Iowa State University during the 1953–54 NCAA men's basketball season. The Cyclones were coached by Clay Sutherland, who was in his seventh and final season with the Cyclones. They played their home games at the Iowa State Armory in Ames, Iowa.

They finished the season 6–15, 2–10 in Big Seven play to finish in sixth place.

== Roster ==
1953–54 Iowa State Cyclones men's basketball team
Players
Coaches

Pos.	#	Name	Height	Weight	Year	Hometown
F		Barney Alleman	6 ft 2 in (1.88 m)	—	Jr	Ankeny, Iowa
F		Dale Benson	6 ft 3 in (1.91 m)	—		Ames, Iowa
C		Bill Dale	6 ft 5 in (1.96 m)	—	So	Lehigh, Iowa
F		Jerry Davis (C)	6 ft 0 in (1.83 m)	—		Ottumwa, Iowa
F		Don DeKoster	6 ft 3 in (1.91 m)	—		Spencer, Iowa
C		Chuck Duncan	6 ft 5 in (1.96 m)	—	Jr	Atlantic, Iowa
F		Stanley Frahm	6 ft 3 in (1.91 m)	—		Manning, Iowa
F		Howie Franks	6 ft 3 in (1.91 m)	—		Fort Dodge, Iowa
G		Arnie Gaarde	5 ft 10 in (1.78 m)	—	So	Armstrong, Iowa
F		Howie Johnson	6 ft 3 in (1.91 m)	—		Shenandoah, Iowa
F		Tom LeBuhn	6 ft 3 in (1.91 m)	—		Davenport, Iowa
G		Don Lorenzen	6 ft 3 in (1.91 m)	—		Reinbeck, Iowa
F		Jake Muehlenthaler	6 ft 4 in (1.93 m)	—		Sheldahl, Iowa
G		Dean Nims	6 ft 1 in (1.85 m)	—		Des Moines, Iowa
G		Duan Overgaard	6 ft 1 in (1.85 m)	—		Farragut, Iowa
G		Carl VanCleave (C)	6 ft 3 in (1.91 m)	—		Montezuma, Iowa
G		Larry Wetter	5 ft 11 in (1.8 m)	—		Rinard, Iowa

Head coach

- Clay Sutherland

Assistant coach(es)

Legend

- (C) Team captain
- (S) Suspended
- (I) Ineligible
- (W) Walk-on
- Injured
- Current redshirt

== Schedule and results ==
Date time, TV	Rank^{#}	Opponent^{#}	Result	Record	Site city, state
Regular season
December 5, 1953*; 1:30 pm		Grinnell	W 76–62	1–0	Iowa State Armory; Ames, Iowa
December 12, 1953*; 8:00 pm		at Creighton	W 72–64	2–0	Vinardi Center; Omaha, Nebraska
December 19, 1953*; 9:00 pm		Colorado A&M (Colorado State)	L 57–65	2–1	Iowa State Armory; Ames, Iowa
December 22, 1953*; 8:15 pm		at Drake; Iowa Big Four	W 69–59	3–1	Drake Fieldhouse; Des Moines, Iowa
December 26, 1953*; 9:45 pm		vs. Missouri; Big Seven Holiday Tournament Quarterfinals	L 65–74	3–2	Municipal Auditorium; Kansas City, Missouri
December 29, 1953*; 2:00 pm		vs. Colorado; Big Seven Holiday Tournament Consolation Semifinals	W 70–63	4–2	Municipal Auditorium; Kansas City, Missouri
December 30, 1953*; 4:00 pm		vs. Kansas State; Big Seven Holiday Tournament Fifth Place	L 77–98	4–3	Municipal Auditorium; Kansas City, Missouri
January 4, 1954; 7:30 pm		Nebraska	L 60–74	4–4 (0–1)	Iowa State Armory; Ames, Iowa
January 9, 1954*; 8:30 pm		at Bradley	L 76–92	4–5	Robertson Memorial Field House; Peoria, Illinois
January 16, 1954; 8:00 pm		at Oklahoma	L 55–63	4–6 (0–2)	OU Field House; Norman, Oklahoma
January 18, 1954; 7:30 pm		at No. 11 Kansas	L 61–76	4–7 (0–3)	Hoch Auditorium; Lawrence, Kansas
January 23, 1954*; 7:30 pm		Drake; Iowa Big Four	L 72–82	4–8	Iowa State Armory; Ames, Iowa
January 26, 1954; 8:00 pm		at Missouri	L 57–62	4–9 (0–4)	Brewer Fieldhouse; Columbia, Missouri
January 30, 1954; 7:30 pm		Kansas State	W 60–56	5–9 (1–4)	Iowa State Armory; Ames, Iowa
February 6, 1954; 7:30 pm		Colorado	L 65–67	5–10 (1–5)	Iowa State Armory; Ames, Iowa
February 13, 1954; 8:00 pm		at Kansas State	W 64–62	6–10 (2–5)	Ahearn Fieldhouse; Manhattan, Kansas
February 15, 1954; 7:00 pm		at Colorado	L 50–70	6–11 (2–6)	Balch Fieldhouse; Boulder, Colorado
February 20, 1954; 7:30 pm		Kansas	L 70–78	6–12 (2–7)	Iowa State Armory; Ames, Iowa
February 22, 1954; 7:30 pm		Oklahoma	L 73–76	6–13 (2–8)	Iowa State Armory; Ames, Iowa
February 27, 1954; 8:00 pm		at Nebraska	L 65–78	6–14 (2–9)	Nebraska Coliseum; Lincoln, Nebraska
March 5, 1954; 8:00 pm		at Missouri	L 57–72	6–15 (2–10)	Iowa State Armory; Ames, Iowa
*Non-conference game. ^{#}Rankings from AP poll. (#) Tournament seedings in parentheses. All times are in Central Time.
