= Red Brown =

Red Brown may refer to:

- Red Brown (politician) (1787–1852), Alabama and Texas politician, known as "Red" due to his ruddy complexion
- Tom Brown (trombonist), (1888–1958) New Orleans jazz trombonist, known as "Red"
- Red Brown (basketball) (1907–1992) American football and college basketball coach, and athletics director
