= 1953–54 Idaho Vandals men's basketball team =

American college basketball season

1953–54 Idaho Vandals men's basketball
- Conference: Pacific Coast Conference
- Record: 15–8 (9–7 PCC)
- Head coach: Charles Finley (7th season)
- Assistant coach: Clem Parberry
- Home arena: Memorial Gymnasium

1953–54 Pacific Coast Conference men's basketball standings
	Conf.				Overall
Team	W		L	PCT	W		L	PCT
North
Oregon State	11	–	5	.688	22	–	8	.733
Idaho	9	–	7	.563	15	–	8	.652
Oregon	9	–	7	.563	17	–	10	.630
Washington	7	–	9	.438	8	–	18	.308
Washington State	4	–	12	.250	10	–	17	.370
South
No. 11 USC †	8	–	4	.667	19	–	14	.576
UCLA	7	–	5	.583	18	–	7	.720
California	6	–	6	.500	17	–	7	.708
Stanford	3	–	9	.250	15	–	10	.600
† Conference playoff series winner Rankings from AP Poll

The 1953–54 Idaho Vandals men's basketball team represented the University of Idaho during the 1953–54 NCAA college basketball season. Members of the Pacific Coast Conference, the Vandals were led by seventh-year head coach Charles Finley and played their home games on campus at Memorial Gymnasium in Moscow, Idaho.

The Vandals were 15–8 overall and 9–7 in conference play.

After seven years at Idaho, Finley left after the season for Mississippi Southern, and was succeeded in May by Harlan Hodges, the head coach at Murray State in Kentucky.
