= 1953–54 Kansas Jayhawks men's basketball team =

American college basketball season

1953–54 Kansas Jayhawks men's basketball

Big Seven Co-Champions
- Conference: Big Seven Conference

Ranking
- Coaches: No. 7
- AP: No. 18
- Record: 16–5 (10–2 Big 7)
- Head coach: Phog Allen (37th season)
- Assistant coach: Dick Harp (5th season)
- Captains: B. H. Born; Allen Kelley
- Home arena: Hoch Auditorium

1953–54 Big Seven Conference men's basketball standings
	Conf.				Overall
Team	W		L	PCT	W		L	PCT
No. 18 Kansas	10	–	2	.833	16	–	5	.762
Colorado	10	–	2	.833	11	–	11	.500
Missouri	6	–	6	.500	11	–	10	.524
Kansas State	5	–	7	.417	11	–	10	.524
Nebraska	5	–	7	.417	8	–	13	.381
Oklahoma	4	–	8	.333	8	–	13	.381
Iowa State	2	–	10	.167	6	–	15	.286
Rankings from AP Poll

The 1953–54 Kansas Jayhawks men's basketball team represented the University of Kansas during the 1953–54 college men's basketball season.

== Roster ==
- B. H. Born
- Dallas Dobbs
- Allen Kelley
- Hal Patterson
- Larry Davenport
- Bill Brainard
- Bill Heitholt
- Harold McElroy
- Gary Padgett
- John Anderson
- Jerry Alberts
- Jack Wolfe
- Chris Divich
- LaVannes Squires
- Jim Toft
- Len Martin
- Bob Crisler

== Schedule ==
Date time, TV	Rank^{#}	Opponent^{#}	Result	Record	Site city, state
December 10*	No. 5	at Tulane	L 65–69	0-1	Avron B. Fogelman Arena; New Orleans, LA
December 12*	No. 5	at No. 10 LSU	L 63–68	0-2	Huey Long Field House; Baton Rouge, LA
December 16*		Tulsa	W 72–61	1-2	Hoch Auditorium; Lawrence, KS
December 26		vs. Colorado	W 79–62	2-2	Municipal Auditorium; Kansas City, MO
December 29		vs. Oklahoma	W 82–73	3-2	Municipal Auditorium; Kansas City, MO
December 29		vs. Missouri; Border War	W 69–66	4-2	Municipal Auditorium; Kansas City, MO
January 4		Oklahoma	W 76–72	5-2 (1-0)	Hoch Auditorium; Lawrence, KS
January 9	No. 16	Missouri; Border War	W 86–69	6-2 (2-0)	Hoch Auditorium; Lawrence, KS
January 12*	No. 11	at No. 4 Oklahoma A&M	L 50–54	6-3	Gallagher-Iba Arena; Stillwater, OK
January 16	No. 11	at Kansas State; Sunflower Showdown	W 65–62	7-3 (3-0)	Ahearn Field House; Manhattan, KS
January 18	No. 11	Iowa State	W 76–61	8-3 (4-0)	Hoch Auditorium; Lawrence, KS
February 2	No. 19	at Colorado	L 62–70	8-4 (4-1)	Balch Fieldhouse; Boulder, CO
February 6	No. 19	at Oklahoma	W 93–80	9-4 (5-1)	Field House; Norman, OK
February 8*	No. 19	at Tulsa	W 71–58	10-4	Expo Square Pavilion; Tulsa, OK
February 13	No. 20	Nebraska	W 79–68	11-4 (6-1)	Hoch Auditorium; Lawrence, KS
February 17		Kansas State; Sunflower Showdown	W 85–74	12-4 (7-1)	Hoch Auditorium; Lawrence, KS
February 20		at Iowa State	W 78–70	13-4 (8-1)	The Armory; Ames, IA
February 22		at Nebraska	W 67–62	14-4 (9-1)	Nebraska Coliseum; Lincoln, NE
February 26*	No. 17	No. 5 Oklahoma A&M	W 66–55	15-4	Hoch Auditorium; Lawrence, KS
March 1	No. 17	Colorado	W 83–62	16-4 (10-1)	Hoch Auditorium; Lawrence, KS
March 9	No. 13	at Missouri	L 67–76	16-5 (10-2)	Brewer Fieldhouse; Columbia, MO
*Non-conference game. ^{#}Rankings from AP Poll. (#) Tournament seedings in parentheses.
