= 1953–54 UCLA Bruins men's basketball team =

American college basketball season

1953–54 UCLA Bruins men's basketball
- Conference: Pacific Coast Conference
- Record: 18–7 (7–5 PCC)
- Head coach: John R. Wooden (6th season)
- Assistant coach: Doug Sale
- Home arena: Men's Gym

1953–54 Pacific Coast Conference men's basketball standings
	Conf.				Overall
Team	W		L	PCT	W		L	PCT
North
Oregon State	11	–	5	.688	22	–	8	.733
Idaho	9	–	7	.563	15	–	8	.652
Oregon	9	–	7	.563	17	–	10	.630
Washington	7	–	9	.438	8	–	18	.308
Washington State	4	–	12	.250	10	–	17	.370
South
No. 11 USC †	8	–	4	.667	19	–	14	.576
UCLA	7	–	5	.583	18	–	7	.720
California	6	–	6	.500	17	–	7	.708
Stanford	3	–	9	.250	15	–	10	.600
† Conference playoff series winner Rankings from AP Poll

The 1953–54 UCLA Bruins men's basketball team represented the University of California, Los Angeles during the 1953–54 NCAA men's basketball season and were members of the Pacific Coast Conference. The Bruins were led by sixth year head coach John Wooden. They finished the regular season with a record of 18–7 and finished 2nd in the PCC Southern Division with a record of 7–5.

== Previous season ==
The Bruins finished the regular season with a record of 16–8 and were 3rd in the PCC Southern Division with a record of 8–4.

== Roster ==
1953–54 UCLA Bruins men's basketball team
Players
Coaches

Pos.	#	Name	Height	Weight	Year	Hometown
F	78	Bob Ballard	6 ft 2 in (1.88 m)	—
F	57	Ron Bane	6 ft 2 in (1.88 m)	—	Jr
G	24	Courtney Borio	5 ft 10 in (1.78 m)	—	Jr
G	56	Don Bragg	6 ft 4 in (1.93 m)	—	Jr
F		Mark Costello	6 ft 2 in (1.88 m)	—	Jr	El Monte, California
C		Mike Hibler	6 ft 7 in (2.01 m)	—	Sr
G	23	Lindy Kell	5 ft 10 in (1.78 m)	—
G	75	Ron Livingston (C)	5 ft 10 in (1.78 m)	—	Sr
G	45	Denny Miller	6 ft 4 in (1.93 m)	—
F	32	John Moore	6 ft 5 in (1.96 m)	—	Jr
C	33	Willie Naulls	6 ft 5 in (1.96 m)	—	So	Dallas, Texas
F	54	Dick Ridgway	6 ft 4 in (1.93 m)	—	Sr
F		Hank Steinman	6 ft 2 in (1.88 m)	—
G	22	Morris Taft	6 ft 2 in (1.88 m)	—	So
F	76	Ed White	6 ft 2 in (1.88 m)	—

Head coach

John Wooden (Purdue)

Assistant coach(es)

- Doug Sale

Legend

- (C) Team captain
- (S) Suspended
- (I) Ineligible
- (W) Walk-on
- Injured
- Current redshirt

Roster
Last update: 30 January 2018

== Schedule ==
Date time, TV	Rank^{#}	Opponent^{#}	Result	Record	Site city, state
Regular Season
December 5, 1953*		West Texas State	W 79–48	1–0	Men's Gym; Los Angeles, CA
December 11, 1953*		Arizona	W 90–45	2–0	Men's Gym; Los Angeles, CA
December 12, 1953*		Arizona	W 84–48	3–0	Men's Gym; Los Angeles, CA
December 18, 1953*	No. 17	at Denver	W 70–63	4–0	Denver University Fieldhouse; Denver, CO
December 19, 1953*	No. 17	at Denver	W 66–45	5–0	Denver University Fieldhouse; Denver, CO
December 21, 1953*	No. 17	vs. No. 20 La Salle	L 53–62	5–1	Memorial Coliseum; Lexington, KY
December 22, 1953*	No. 13	vs. Duke	W 72–67	6–2	Memorial Coliseum; Lexington, KY
December 26, 1953	No. 13	Oregon	W 89–74	7–2	Men's Gym; Los Angeles, CA
December 28, 1953	No. 13	Oregon	W 79–53	8–2	Men's Gym; Los Angeles, CA
December 30, 1953*	No. 14	Iowa	L 60–65	8–3	Men's Gym; Los Angeles, CA
December 31, 1953*	No. 14	Michigan State	W 67–57	9–4	Men's Gym; Los Angeles, CA
January 8, 1954		at California	L 53–62	9–5 (0–1)	Men's Gym; Berkeley, CA
January 9, 1954		at California	L 65–73	9–6 (0–2)	Men's Gym; Berkeley, CA
January 15, 1954		at USC	L 65–68	9–7 (0–3)	Pan-Pacific Auditorium; Los Angeles, CA
January 16, 1954		at USC	W 81–63	10–7 (1–3)	Pan-Pacific Auditorium; Los Angeles, CA
January 29, 1954*		Pacific	W 66–56	11–7	Men's Gym; Los Angeles, CA
January 30, 1954		Pepperdine	W 103–68	12–7	Men's Gym; Los Angeles, CA
February 5, 1954		Stanford	W 92–73	13–7 (2–3)	Men's Gym; Los Angeles, CA
February 6, 1954		Stanford	W 77–58	14–7 (3–3)	Men's Gym; Los Angeles, CA
February 12, 1954		No. 14 California	W 82–54	15–7 (4–3)	Men's Gym; Los Angeles, CA
February 13, 1954		No. 14 California	W 71–62	16–7 (5–3)	Men's Gym; Los Angeles, CA
February 19, 1954		at Stanford	W 92–77	17–7 (6–3)	Stanford Pavilion; Stanford, CA
February 20, 1954		at Stanford	W 88–80	18–8 (7–3)	Stanford Pavilion; Stanford, CA
February 26, 1954		USC	L 68–79	18–9 (7–4)	Men's Gym; Los Angeles, CA
February 27, 1954		USC	L 68–79	18–10 (7–5)	Men's Gym; Los Angeles, CA
*Non-conference game. ^{#}Rankings from AP Poll. (#) Tournament seedings in parentheses. All times are in Pacific Time.
