= 1953–54 Ohio Bobcats men's basketball team =

American college basketball season

1953–54 Ohio Bobcats men's basketball
- Conference: Mid-American Conference
- Record: 12–10 (5–7 MAC)
- Head coach: Jim Snyder (5th season)
- Home arena: Men's Gymnasium

1953–54 Mid-American Conference men's basketball standings
	Conf.				Overall
Team	W		L	PCT	W		L	PCT
Toledo	10	–	2	.833	13	–	10	.565
Bowling Green	10	–	3	.769	17	–	7	.708
Miami (Ohio)	7	–	5	.583	12	–	10	.545
Marshall	6	–	7	.462	12	–	9	.571
Western Michigan	4	–	5	.444	10	–	11	.476
Ohio	5	–	7	.417	12	–	10	.545
Kent State	3	–	9	.250	8	–	13	.381
Western Reserve	2	–	9	.182	7	–	17	.292
Rankings from AP Poll

The 1953–54 Ohio Bobcats men's basketball team represented Ohio University as a member of the Mid-American Conference in the college basketball season of 1953–54. The team was coached by Jim Snyder and played their home games at the Men's Gymnasium. The Bobcats finished the regular season with a record of 12–10 and finished sixth in the MAC regular season with a conference record of 5–7.

== Schedule ==
Date time, TV	Rank^{#}	Opponent^{#}	Result	Record	Site (attendance) city, state
Regular Season
12/1/1953*		at Illinois	L 54–85	0–1	
12/5/1953*		Marietta	W 83–72	1–1	
12/8/1953*		Ohio Wesleyan	W 85–67	2–1	
12/12/1953*		Washington & Jefferson	W 65–57	3–1	
MAC regular season
12/15/1953		at Marshall	L 67–71	3–2 (0–1)	
12/19/1953		at Kent State	W 70–57	4–2 (1–1)	
12/21/1953*		at Gannon	W 69–65	5–2	
12/22/1953*		at Buffalo	W 62–58	6–2	
1/9/1954		at Miami (OH)	L 80–92	6–3 (1–2)	
1/11/1954		Kent State	W 89–77	7–3 (2–2)	
1/13/1954*		at Denison	L 66–72	7–4	
1/15/1954		Toledo	L 80–84	7–5 (2–3)	
1/22/1954		Bowling Green	L 72–78	7–6 (2–4)	
1/30/1954		Miami (OH)	W 80–72	8–6 (3–4)	
2/6/1954		Western Michigan	W 67–59	9–6 (4–4)	
2/10/1954*		Muskingum	W 90–50	10–6	
2/13/1954		at Bowling Green	L 74–78	10–7 (4–5)	
2/19/1954		at Toledo	L 66–71	10–8 (4–6)	
2/20/1954		at Western Michigan	L 72–79	10–9 (4–7)	
2/25/1954		Marshall	W 81–63	11–9 (5–7)	
2/27/1954*		Akron	W 80–75	12–9	
3/2/1954*		at Marietta	L 93–116	12–10	
*Non-conference game. ^{#}Rankings from AP Poll. (#) Tournament seedings in parentheses. All times are in Eastern Time.

== Statistics ==
=== Team statistics ===
Final 1953–54 statistics

Record	Ohio	OPP
Scoring	1615	1598
Scoring Average	73.41	72.64
Field goals – Att	597–1672	529–1562
Free throws – Att	451–697	540–851
Rebounds	1200	910
Assists		
Turnovers		
Steals		
Blocked Shots		

=== Player statistics ===
			Minutes		Scoring		Total FGs			Free-Throws			Rebounds						
Player	GP	GS	Tot	Avg	Pts	Avg	FG	FGA	Pct	FT	FTA	Pct	Tot	Avg	A	PF	TO	Stl	Blk
Lou Sawchik	22	-			381	17.3	133	341	0.390	115	181	0.635	306	13.9		69			
Jim Betts	22	-			329	15.0	125	352	0.355	79	134	0.590	252	11.5		83			
Dick Murphy	22	-			236	10.7	86	246	0.350	64	94	0.681	138	6.3		75			
Dick Garrison	22	-			181	8.2	63	157	0.401	55	82	0.671	147	6.7		81			
Bob Strawser	22	-			154	7.0	55	155	0.355	44	61	0.721	77	3.5		63			
Larry Morrison	21	-			139	6.6	57	157	0.363	25	48	0.521	36	1.7		55			
Dick Miller	19	-			69	3.6	23	53	0.434	23	30	0.767	23	1.2		32			
Ralph Nuzum	16	-			48	3.0	14	58	0.241	20	25	0.800	32	2.0		21			
Lemuel Nixon	14	-			38	2.7	15	58	0.259	8	13	0.615	49	3.5		23			
Glenn Randall	11	-			33	3.0	10	41	0.244	13	14	0.929	11	1.0		15			
Harry Weinbrecht	11	-			18	1.6	8	26	0.308	2	5	0.400	13	1.2		18			
Don Del Corso	5	-			10	2.0	4	8	0.500	2	6	0.333	2	0.4		4			
Jack Duschinski	2	-			3	1.5	1	4	0.250	1	1	1.000	1	0.5		1			
Roger Melick	2	-			2	1.0	1	1	1.000	0	1	0.000	3	1.5		3			
Nate Reynard	4	-			2	0.5	1	2	0.500	0	2	0.000	3	0.8		2			
John Dunnette	2	-			0	0.0	0	0	0.000	0	0	0.000	1	0.5		3			
Total	22	-	-	-	1615	73.4	597	1672	0.357	451	697	0.647	1200	54.5		549			
Opponents	22	-	-	-	1598	72.6	529	1562	0.339	540	851	0.635	910	41.4		471			

Legend
GP	Games played	GS	Games started	Avg	Average per game
FG	Field-goals made	FGA	Field-goal attempts	Off	Offensive rebounds
Def	Defensive rebounds	A	Assists	TO	Turnovers
Blk	Blocks	Stl	Steals	High	Team high
