= 1953–54 Michigan Wolverines men's basketball team =

American college basketball season

1953–54 Michigan Wolverines men's basketball
- Conference: Big Ten Conference
- Record: 9–13 (3–11 Big Ten)
- Head coach: William Perigo
- Captain: Ray Pavichevich
- Home arena: Yost Field House

1953–54 Big Ten Conference men's basketball standings
	Conf.				Overall
Team	W		L	PCT	W		L	PCT
No. 4 Indiana	12	–	2	.857	20	–	4	.833
No. 13 Iowa	11	–	3	.786	17	–	5	.773
No. 19 Illinois	10	–	4	.714	17	–	5	.773
Minnesota	10	–	4	.714	17	–	5	.773
Wisconsin	6	–	8	.429	12	–	10	.545
Northwestern	6	–	8	.429	9	–	13	.409
Ohio State	5	–	9	.357	11	–	11	.500
Michigan State	4	–	10	.286	9	–	13	.409
Michigan	3	–	11	.214	9	–	13	.409
Purdue	3	–	11	.214	9	–	13	.409
Rankings from AP Poll

The 1953–54 Michigan Wolverines men's basketball team represented the University of Michigan in intercollegiate basketball during the 1953–54 season. The team finished the season with an overall record of 9–13 and 3–11 against Big Ten Conference opponents.

William Perigo was in his second year as the team's head coach. Jim Barron was the team's leading scorer with 377 points in 22 games for an average of 17.1 points per game. Ray Pavichevich was the team captain.

== Statistical leaders ==
Player	Pos.	Yr	G	FG	FT	RB	Pts	PPG
Jim Barron			22	131-336	115-188		377	17.1
Tom Jorgensen			22	101-331	70-92		272	12.3
Paul Groffsky			22	91-284	68-125		250	11.3
Don Eaddy			22	82-239	41-66		205	9.3
Harvey Williams			21	82-200	31-52		195	9.2
Milt Mead			22	38-122	48-70		124	5.6
John Codwell			21	33-91	36-63		102	4.8
Totals			22	584-1693	429-692		1597	72.5
