= 1953–54 Iowa Hawkeyes men's basketball team =

American college basketball season

1953–54 Iowa Hawkeyes men's basketball
- Conference: Big Ten Conference

Ranking
- Coaches: No. 10
- AP: No. 13
- Record: 17–5 (11–3 Big Ten)
- Head coach: Bucky O'Connor (1st season)
- Home arena: Iowa Field House

1953–54 Big Ten Conference men's basketball standings
	Conf.				Overall
Team	W		L	PCT	W		L	PCT
No. 4 Indiana	12	–	2	.857	20	–	4	.833
No. 13 Iowa	11	–	3	.786	17	–	5	.773
No. 19 Illinois	10	–	4	.714	17	–	5	.773
Minnesota	10	–	4	.714	17	–	5	.773
Wisconsin	6	–	8	.429	12	–	10	.545
Northwestern	6	–	8	.429	9	–	13	.409
Ohio State	5	–	9	.357	11	–	11	.500
Michigan State	4	–	10	.286	9	–	13	.409
Michigan	3	–	11	.214	9	–	13	.409
Purdue	3	–	11	.214	9	–	13	.409
Rankings from AP Poll

The 1953–54 Iowa Hawkeyes men's basketball team represented the University of Iowa in intercollegiate basketball during the 1953–54 season. The team was led by third-year head coach Bucky O'Connor and played their home games at the Iowa Field House. The Hawkeyes finished the season with a 17–5 record (11–3 in Big Ten) and in second place in the Big Ten standings.

== Roster ==
1953–54 Iowa Hawkeyes men's basketball team
Players
Coaches

Pos.	#	Name	Height	Weight	Year	Hometown
F	21	Carl Cain	6 ft 3 in (1.91 m)	—	So	Freeport High School	Freeport, IL
F	16	McKinley Davis	6 ft 2 in (1.88 m)	—	Jr	–	Freeport, IL
C	31	Bill Logan	6 ft 6 in (1.98 m)	—	So	–	Keokuk, IA
G	46	Sharm Scheuerman	6 ft 2 in (1.88 m)	—	So	Rock Island High School	Moline, IL
F	33	Bill Schoof	6 ft 6 in (1.98 m)	—	So	–	Homewood, IL
G	22	Bill Seaberg	6 ft 2 in (1.88 m)	—	So	–	Moline, IL

Head coach

- Bucky O'Connor (Drake)

Assistant coach(es)

Legend

- (C) Team captain
- (S) Suspended
- (I) Ineligible
- (W) Walk-on
- Injured
- Current redshirt

== Schedule/results ==
Date time, TV	Rank^{#}	Opponent^{#}	Result	Record	Site (attendance) city, state
Non-conference
Dec 5, 1953*		Washington (MO)	W 51–45	1–0	Iowa Field House; Iowa City, Iowa
Dec 12, 1953*		at Nebraska; Rivalry	L 70–81	1–1	Nebraska Coliseum; Lincoln, Nebraska
Dec 15, 1953*		Colorado State	W 72–55	2–1	Iowa Field House; Iowa City, Iowa
Dec 18, 1953*		Southern California	W 66–57	3–1	Iowa Field House; Iowa City, Iowa
Dec 21, 1953*		Colorado	W 78–72	4–1	Iowa Field House; Iowa City, Iowa
Dec 30, 1953*		at No. 14 UCLA	W 65–60	5–1	UCLA Men's Gym; Los Angeles, California
Dec 31, 1953*		at Southern California	L 60–70	5–2	Los Angeles, California
Conference
Jan 4, 1954*		Michigan State	W 73–63	6–2 (1–0)	Iowa Field House; Iowa City, Iowa
Jan 9, 1954*		Wisconsin	W 71–54	7–2 (2–0)	Iowa Field House; Iowa City, Iowa
Jan 11, 1954*		Michigan	W 93–78	8–2 (3–0)	Iowa Field House; Iowa City, Iowa
Jan 16, 1954*		No. 10 Minnesota	L 55–59	8–3 (3–1)	Iowa Field House; Iowa City, Iowa
Jan 18, 1954*		at No. 19 Illinois	W 79–70	9–3 (4–1)	Huff Hall; Champaign, Illinois
Jan 23, 1954*		at Purdue	W 70–62	10–3 (5–1)	Lambert Fieldhouse; West Lafayette, Indiana
Jan 25, 1954		Northwestern	W 65–52	11–3 (6–1)	Iowa Field House; Iowa City, Iowa
Feb 6, 1954*		Missouri	W 73–53	12–3	Iowa Field House; Iowa City, Iowa
Feb 8, 1954		at Michigan	W 86–68	13–3 (7–1)	Yost Field House; Ann Arbor, Michigan
Feb 13, 1954		at No. 12 Minnesota	W 86–82	14–3 (8–1)	Williams Arena; Minneapolis, Minnesota
Feb 15, 1954	No. 10	at Ohio State	L 69–77	14–4 (8–2)	Ohio State Men's Gym; Columbus, Ohio
Feb 20, 1954	No. 10	Illinois	L 51–74	14–5 (8–3)	Iowa Field House; Iowa City, Iowa
Feb 22, 1954	No. 20	at No. 3 Indiana	W 82–64	15–5 (9–3)	The Fieldhouse; Bloomington, Indiana
Feb 27, 1954	No. 20	at Michigan State	W 60–48	16–5 (10–3)	Jenison Field House; East Lansing, Michigan
Mar 1, 1954	No. 16	Ohio State	W 84–71	17–5 (11–3)	Iowa Field House; Iowa City, Iowa
*Non-conference game. ^{#}Rankings from AP Poll. (#) Tournament seedings in parentheses.
