= 1953–54 Indiana Hoosiers men's basketball team =

American college basketball season

1953–54 Indiana Hoosiers men's basketball

UP Poll regular season champions Big Ten Champions

NCAA men's Division I tournament, Regional Third Place
- Conference: Big Ten Conference

Ranking
- Coaches: No. 1
- AP: No. 4
- Record: 20–4 (12–2 Big Ten)
- Head coach: Branch McCracken (13th season)
- Assistant coaches: Ernie Andres; Phil Buck
- Captain: Bobby Leonard
- Home arena: The Fieldhouse

1953–54 Big Ten Conference men's basketball standings
	Conf.				Overall
Team	W		L	PCT	W		L	PCT
No. 4 Indiana	12	–	2	.857	20	–	4	.833
No. 13 Iowa	11	–	3	.786	17	–	5	.773
No. 19 Illinois	10	–	4	.714	17	–	5	.773
Minnesota	10	–	4	.714	17	–	5	.773
Wisconsin	6	–	8	.429	12	–	10	.545
Northwestern	6	–	8	.429	9	–	13	.409
Ohio State	5	–	9	.357	11	–	11	.500
Michigan State	4	–	10	.286	9	–	13	.409
Michigan	3	–	11	.214	9	–	13	.409
Purdue	3	–	11	.214	9	–	13	.409
Rankings from AP Poll

The 1953–54 Indiana Hoosiers men's basketball team represented Indiana University. Their head coach was Branch McCracken, who was in his 13th year. The team played its home games in The Fieldhouse in Bloomington, Indiana, and was a member of the Big Ten Conference.

As reigning national champions, the Hoosiers finished the regular season with an overall record of 20–4 and a conference record of 12–2, finishing 1st in the Big Ten Conference. As Big Ten Conference Champions, Indiana was invited to participate in the NCAA tournament, where they advanced to Regional Third Place.

== Roster ==
No.	Name	Position	Ht.	Year	Hometown
13	Charlie Kraak	F	6–5	Sr.	Collinsville, Illinois
14	Phil Byers	G	5–11	Jr.	Evansville, Indiana
15	Neal Skeeters	G	5–11	So.	Louisville, Kentucky
20	Jim Barley	G	6–2	So.	Marion, Indiana
21	Bobby Leonard	G	6–3	Sr.	Terre Haute, Indiana
22	Jim DeaKyne	G	6–3	Sr.	Fortville, Indiana
23	Jim Phipps	G	5–11	So.	Kokomo, Indiana
24	Sherrill Marginet	G	6–1	So.	Fort Branch, Indiana
25	Burke Scott	G	6–1	Jr.	Tell City, Indiana
30	Paul Poff	G	6–1	Jr.	New Albany, Indiana
31	Dick Farley	F	6–3	Sr.	Winslow, Indiana
32	Warren Fisher	F	6–3	So.	Terre Haute, Indiana
33	Bill Maetschke	F	6–4	So.	New Albany, Indiana
34	Don Schlundt	C	6–10	Jr.	South Bend, Indiana
35	Lou Scott	C	6–10	Sr.	Chicago
41	Dick White	F	6–1	Jr.	Terre Haute, Indiana
42	Charles Mead	G	6–3	So.	Oak Park, Illinois
43	Cliff Williamson	F	6–3	So.	Kokomo, Indiana
44	Wally Choice	F	6–4	So.	Montclair, New Jersey
45	Frank Stemle	F	6–3	So.	New Albany, Indiana

== Schedule/results ==
Date time, TV	Rank^{#}	Opponent^{#}	Result	Record	Site city, state
Regular season
12/5/1953*		Cincinnati	W 78–65	1–0	The Fieldhouse; Bloomington, Indiana
12/7/1953*		Kansas State	W 92–66	2–0	The Fieldhouse; Bloomington, Indiana
12/12/1953*	No. 1	at Butler	W 76–57	3–0	Butler Fieldhouse; Indianapolis
12/14/1953*	No. 1	Notre Dame	W 66–55	4–0	The Fieldhouse; Bloomington, Indiana
12/18/1953*	No. 1	at Montana	W 74–54	5–0	Dahlberg Arena; Missoula, Montana
12/21/1953*	No. 1	at Oregon State	W 76–72	6–0	Oregon State Coliseum; Corvallis, Oregon
12/22/1953*	No. 1	at Oregon State	L 51–67	6–1	Oregon State Coliseum; Corvallis, Oregon
1/2/1954	No. 3	at Michigan	W 62–60	7–1 (1–0)	Yost Field House; Ann Arbor, Michigan
1/4/1954	No. 3	Wisconsin	W 70–67	8–1 (2–0)	The Fieldhouse; Bloomington, Indiana
1/9/1954	No. 3	at Minnesota	W 71–63	9–1 (3–0)	Williams Arena; Minneapolis
1/11/1954	No. 3	Purdue; Rivalry	W 73–67	10–1 (4–0)	The Fieldhouse; Bloomington, Indiana
1/16/1954	No. 3	at Wisconsin	W 90–74	11–1 (5–0)	Wisconsin Field House; Madison, Wisconsin
1/18/1954	No. 3	Ohio State	W 94–72	12–1 (6–0)	The Fieldhouse; Bloomington, Indiana
2/1/1954*	No. 3	Louisville	W 80–71	13–1 (6–0)	The Fieldhouse; Bloomington, Indiana
2/6/1954	No. 3	Michigan State	W 79–74	14–1 (7–0)	The Fieldhouse; Bloomington, Indiana
2/8/1954	No. 3	Minnesota	W 90–77	15–1 (8–0)	The Fieldhouse; Bloomington, Indiana
2/13/1954	No. 3	at Northwestern	L 90–100	15–2 (8–1)	Welsh-Ryan Arena; Evanston, Illinois
2/15/1954	No. 3	at Purdue; Rivalry	W 86–50	16–2 (9–1)	Lambert Fieldhouse; West Lafayette, Indiana
2/20/1954	No. 3	at Michigan State	W 63–61	17–2 (10–1)	Jenison Fieldhouse; East Lansing, Michigan
2/22/1954	No. 3	Iowa	L 64–82	17–3 (10–2)	The Fieldhouse; Bloomington, Indiana
2/27/1954	No. 3	at Ohio State	W 84–68	18–3 (11–2)	Ohio Expo Center Coliseum; Columbus, Ohio
3/6/1954	No. 2	Illinois; Rivalry	W 67–64	19–3 (12–2)	The Fieldhouse; Bloomington, Indiana
NCAA tournament
3/12/1954*	No. 2	vs. Notre Dame; Regional semifinals	L 64–65	19–4 (12–2)	Iowa Field House; Iowa City, Iowa
3/13/1954*	No. 2	vs. LSU; Regional Third Place	W 73–62	20–4 (12–2)	Iowa Field House; Iowa City, Iowa
*Non-conference game. ^{#}Rankings from AP Poll. (#) Tournament seedings in parentheses.
