= 1953–54 Kentucky Wildcats men's basketball team =

1953–54 season of University of Kentucky men's basketball team

1953–54 Kentucky Wildcats men's basketball

SEC Regular season co-champions AP Poll regular season champions Helms Foundation National Champions
- Conference: Southeast Conference

Ranking
- Coaches: No. 2
- AP: No. 1
- Record: 25–0 (14–0 SEC)
- Head coach: Adolph Rupp
- Assistant coach: Harry Lancaster
- Home arena: Memorial Coliseum

1953–54 Southeastern Conference men's basketball standings
	Conf.				Overall
Team	W		L	PCT	W		L	PCT
No. 1 Kentucky	14	–	0	1.000	25	–	0	1.000
No. 14 LSU	14	–	0	1.000	20	–	5	.800
Alabama	10	–	4	.714	16	–	8	.667
Tulane	10	–	4	.714	15	–	8	.652
Auburn	8	–	6	.571	16	–	8	.667
Ole Miss	7	–	7	.500	12	–	12	.500
Tennessee	7	–	7	.500	11	–	12	.478
Vanderbilt	5	–	9	.357	12	–	10	.545
Mississippi State	5	–	9	.357	11	–	10	.524
Florida	3	–	11	.214	7	–	15	.318
Georgia	2	–	12	.143	7	–	18	.280
Georgia Tech	0	–	14	.000	2	–	22	.083
Rankings from AP Poll

The 1953–54 Kentucky Wildcats men's basketball team represented University of Kentucky. The head coach was Adolph Rupp. The team was a member of the Southeast Conference and played their home games at Memorial Coliseum. Kentucky ended the season ranked No. 1 in the final post-tournament AP Poll, and were additionally named national champions by the Helms Athletic Foundation.

== Season summary ==
This team finished unbeaten 25–0, and though it won the Southeastern Conference title and could have played in the NCAA tournament, it chose not to because star players Frank Ramsey, Cliff Hagan and Lou Tsioropoulos were ruled ineligible because they had already graduated. That rule has since been abolished, but it prevented the Wildcats from competing for the national championship.

== Roster ==
1953–54 Kentucky Wildcats men's basketball team
Players
Coaches

Pos.	#	Name	Height	Weight	Year	Previous school	Hometown
F	66	Bill Bibb	6 ft 4 in (1.93 m)	190 lb (86 kg)	So	—	Owensboro, KY
F	22	Jerry Bird	6 ft 6 in (1.98 m)	200 lb (91 kg)	So	—	Corbin, KY
G	73	Dan Chandler	5 ft 11 in (1.8 m)	160 lb (73 kg)	So	—	Versailles, KY
F	34	Hugh Coy	6 ft 1 in (1.85 m)	185 lb (84 kg)	So	Madison	Richmond, KY
G	35	Jess Curry	5 ft 11 in (1.8 m)	167 lb (76 kg)	So	—	Portsmouth, VA
G/F	42	Billy Evans	6 ft 1 in (1.85 m)	170 lb (77 kg)	Jr	—	Berea, KY
G	32	Clay Evans	5 ft 9 in (1.75 m)	165 lb (75 kg)	So	—	Flemingsburg, KY
F	44	Phil Grawemeyer	6 ft 7 in (2.01 m)	180 lb (82 kg)	So	duPont Manual	Louisville, KY
G	25	Pete Grigsby	5 ft 0 in (1.52 m)	165 lb (75 kg)	So	—	Martin, KY
C	6	Cliff Hagan	6 ft 4 in (1.93 m)	200 lb (91 kg)	Sr	Owensboro	Owensboro, KY
C	77	Harold Hurst	6 ft 7 in (2.01 m)	190 lb (86 kg)	So	Powell County	Waltersville, KY
G	33	Linville Puckett	6 ft 0 in (1.83 m)	165 lb (75 kg)	So	Clark County	Winchester, KY
G	30	Frank Ramsey	6 ft 3 in (1.91 m)	185 lb (84 kg)	Sr	Madisonville	Madisonville, KY
G	20	Gayle Rose	6 ft 0 in (1.83 m)	170 lb (77 kg)	Jr	—	Paris, KY
G	19	Willie Rouse (injured)	6 ft 0 in (1.83 m)	190 lb (86 kg)	Jr	University	Lexington, KY
F	16	Lou Tsioropoulos	6 ft 5 in (1.96 m)	200 lb (91 kg)	Sr	Lynn Classical	Lynn, MA

Head coach

- Adolph Rupp

Assistant coach(es)

- Harry Lancaster

Legend

- (C) Team captain
- (S) Suspended
- (I) Ineligible
- (W) Walk-on
- Injured
- Current redshirt

Roster
Last update: 2015-09-07

== Postseason ==
The Wildcats were the top-ranked team in the nation with a record of 25–0. Despite the undefeated season, the Wildcats did not participate in any post-season tournament. Three players (Lou Tsioropoulos, Frank Ramsey, and Cliff Hagan) had technically graduated the year before (when Kentucky was banned from playing a competitive schedule due to the point-shaving scandal a few years earlier), so those players were ruled ineligible for the NCAA tournament. Despite the wishes of the players, coach Adolph Rupp ultimately decided his team wouldn't play.

== Team players drafted into the NBA ==
No one from the Wildcats was selected in the 1954 NBA Draft, as Ramsey, Hagan, and Tsioropoulos had been drafted the previous year, and those teams held their rights.
