= 1953–54 Illinois Fighting Illini men's basketball team =

American college basketball season

1953–54 Illinois Fighting Illini men's basketball
- Conference: Big Ten Conference

Ranking
- AP: No. 19
- Record: 17–5 (10-4 Big Ten)
- Head coach: Harry Combes (7th season)
- Assistant coach: Howie Braun (17th season)
- MVP: John Kerr
- Captain: John Kerr
- Home arena: Huff Hall

1953–54 Big Ten Conference men's basketball standings
	Conf.				Overall
Team	W		L	PCT	W		L	PCT
No. 4 Indiana	12	–	2	.857	20	–	4	.833
No. 13 Iowa	11	–	3	.786	17	–	5	.773
No. 19 Illinois	10	–	4	.714	17	–	5	.773
Minnesota	10	–	4	.714	17	–	5	.773
Wisconsin	6	–	8	.429	12	–	10	.545
Northwestern	6	–	8	.429	9	–	13	.409
Ohio State	5	–	9	.357	11	–	11	.500
Michigan State	4	–	10	.286	9	–	13	.409
Michigan	3	–	11	.214	9	–	13	.409
Purdue	3	–	11	.214	9	–	13	.409
Rankings from AP Poll

The 1953–54 Illinois Fighting Illini men’s basketball team represented the University of Illiniois.

== Regular season ==
In his seventh year at Illinois, Harry Combes continued to offer the fans of the Fighting Illini a successful team that they could be follow across the country to record crowds. The 1953-54 team returned one of the most dominant players in the NCAA, Johnny "Red" Kerr. During the season, Kerr shattered Illinois’ single-season scoring record by tallying 556 points in his senior year. Kerr’s 1,299 career points in three seasons currently ranks 20th on the all-time Illinois scoring list. After his Illinois career came to an end, Kerr started a 12-year professional career followed by becoming the first head coach of the Chicago Bulls in 1966.

The 1954 team added twin brothers, Paul and Phil Judson from Hebron, Illinois, Bruce Brothers and Bill Ridley as sophomores. A youth movement that helped the Illini finish in a 3rd place tie in the Big Ten. Unfortunately the Illini would lose 5 total games with three of the five losses coming at the hands of ranked opponents. The starting lineup included captain John Kerr at the center position, Jim Wright and Paul Judson at guard and Bruce Brothers and Max Hooper at the forward slots.

=== Roster ===
1953–54 Illinois Fighting Illini men's basketball team
Players
Coaches

Pos.	#	Name	Height	Weight	Year	Previous school	Hometown
G	7	Morris Sterneck	6 ft 1 in (1.85 m)	170 lb (77 kg)	Jr	Salem High School	Salem, Illinois
G	9	Elmer Plew	6 ft 0 in (1.83 m)	165 lb (75 kg)	Jr	Paris High School	Paris, Illinois
G	11	Bill Ridley	5 ft 9 in (1.75 m)	152 lb (69 kg)	So	Taylorville High School	Taylorville, Illinois
G	12	Warren Wilkinson	5 ft 11 in (1.8 m)	160 lb (73 kg)	So	Frankfort Community High School	West Frankfort, Illinois
G	14	Robert Leigh	6 ft 1 in (1.85 m)	170 lb (77 kg)	So	East Lynn High School	East Lynn, Illinois
G	15	Glass Peterson	5 ft 11 in (1.8 m)	180 lb (82 kg)	So	Pekin High School	Pekin, Illinois
G	16	Jim Wright	6 ft 0 in (1.83 m)	165 lb (75 kg)	Sr	Lawrenceville High School	Lawrenceville, Illinois
C	22	Johnny Kerr (C)	6 ft 9 in (2.06 m)	215 lb (98 kg)	Sr	Tilden High School	Chicago, Illinois
G	24	Ed Makovsky	6 ft 5 in (1.96 m)	205 lb (93 kg)	Jr	Morton High School	Cicero, Illinois
F	25	Robert Reitsch	6 ft 3 in (1.91 m)	188 lb (85 kg)	So	Rockford West High School	Rockford, Illinois
F	27	Jim Dutcher	6 ft 3 in (1.91 m)	188 lb (85 kg)	Jr	Downers Grove High School	Downers Grove, Illinois
G	30	Phil Judson	6 ft 2 in (1.88 m)	170 lb (77 kg)	So	Alden-Hebron High School	Hebron, Illinois
F	32	Bruce Brothers	6 ft 5 in (1.96 m)	200 lb (91 kg)	So	Quincy Senior High School	Quincy, Illinois
G	34	Paul Judson	6 ft 3 in (1.91 m)	170 lb (77 kg)	So	Alden-Hebron High School	Hebron, Illinois
F	47	Max Hooper	6 ft 5 in (1.96 m)	195 lb (88 kg)	Sr	Mt. Vernon High School	Mt. Vernon, Illinois
F	48	Earl Newman	6 ft 3 in (1.91 m)	220 lb (100 kg)	Jr	Marshall High School	Chicago, Illinois

Head coach

- Harry Combes (University of Illinois) (7th year)

Assistant coach(es)

- Howie Braun (University of Illinois) (17th year)

Legend

- (C) Team captain
- (S) Suspended
- (I) Ineligible
- (W) Walk-on
- Injured
- Current redshirt

Roster

== Schedule ==
Date time, TV	Rank^{#}	Opponent^{#}	Result	Record	Site (attendance) city, state
Non-Conference regular season
12/1/1953*		Ohio	W 88–54	1-0	Huff Hall (6,913); Champaign, IL
12/5/1953*		at Oklahoma	W 86–61	2-0	McCasland Field House (5,000); Norman, OK
12/9/1953*	No. 9	Butler	W 80–48	3-0	Huff Hall (6,913); Champaign, IL
12/12/1953*	No. 9	Alabama	W 77–54	4-0	Huff Hall (6,410); Champaign, IL
12/19/1953*	No. 4	DePaul	W 79–65	5-0	Huff Hall (2,719); Champaign, IL
12/21/1953*	No. 4	No. 7 Oklahoma A&M	L 60–65 ^{OT}	5-1	Huff Hall (4,234); Champaign, IL
12/29/1953*	No. 8	Utah State	W 88–61	6-1	Huff Hall (2,649); Champaign, IL
Big Ten regular season
1/1/1954	No. 8	No. 6 Minnesota	L 72–84	6-2 (0-1)	Huff Hall (6,193); Champaign, IL
1/4/1954	No. 8	at Northwestern; Rivalry	W 66–65	7-2 (1-1)	McGaw Memorial Hall (9,253); Evanston, IL
1/9/1954	No. 15	at Michigan State	L 59–60	7-3 (1-2)	Jenison Fieldhouse (9,002); East Lansing, MI
1/11/1954	No. 15	Ohio State	W 90–76	8-3 (2-2)	Huff Hall (8,683); Champaign, IL
1/16/1954	No. 19	at Ohio State	W 82–78	9-3 (3-2)	Ohio Expo Center Coliseum (8,683); Columbus, OH
1/18/1954	No. 19	Iowa; Rivalry	L 70–79	9-4 (2-3)	Huff Hall (6,913); Champaign, IL
2/1/1954*		at DePaul	W 71–61	10-4	Alumni Hall (9,678); Chicago, IL
2/6/1954		Michigan	W 87–68	11-4 (3-3)	Huff Hall (6,913); Champaign, IL
2/8/1954		Purdue	W 89–55	12-4 (4-3)	Huff Hall (6,913); Champaign, IL
2/13/1954		at Wisconsin	W 70–64 ^{OT}	13-4 (5-3)	Wisconsin Field House (13,000); Madison, WI
2/20/1954		at No. 10 Iowa; Rivalry	W 74–51	14-4 (6-3)	Iowa Field House (15,700); Iowa City, IA
2/22/1954		Wisconsin	W 66–64	15-4 (7-3)	Huff Hall (6,913); Champaign, IL
2/27/1954	No. 20	at Michigan	W 79–61	16-4 (8-3)	Yost Field House (4,500); Ann Arbor, MI
3/1/1954	No. 20	Northwestern; Rivalry	W 84–82	17-4 (9-3)	Huff Hall (6,782); Champaign, IL
3/6/1954		at No. 2 Indiana; Rivalry	L 64–67	17-5 (9-4)	The Fieldhouse (11,000); Bloomington, IN
*Non-conference game. ^{#}Rankings from AP Poll. (#) Tournament seedings in parentheses. All times are in Central Time.

== Player stats ==
Player	Games played	Field goals	Free throws	Points
John Kerr	22	210	136	556
Paul Judson	22	92	62	246
Bruce Brothers	22	64	59	187
Max Hooper	22	67	34	168
Jim Wright	22	59	45	163
Bill Ridley	19	30	54	114
Jim Dutcher	19	30	32	92
Ed Makovsky	22	22	21	65
Morris Sterneck	16	17	9	43
Elmer Plew	13	7	6	20
Phil Judson	9	4	5	13
Warren Wilkinson	5	2	1	5
Robert Reitsch	9	1	2	4
Earl Newman	4	0	2	2

== Awards and honors ==
- Johnny Kerr
  - Helms 2nd Team All-American
  - Look Magazine 3rd Team All-American
  - Associated Press 3rd Team All-American
  - United Press International 3rd Team All-American
  - Converse Honorable Mention All-American
  - Team Most Valuable Player

== Team players drafted into the NBA ==
Player	NBA club	Round	Pick
Johnny Kerr	Syracuse Nationals	1	6
