= 1953–54 Wisconsin Badgers men's basketball team =

American college basketball season

1953–54 Wisconsin Badgers men's basketball
- Conference: Big Ten Conference
- Record: 12–10 (6–8 Big Ten)
- Head coach: Harold E. Foster
- Home arena: UW Fieldhouse

1953–54 Big Ten Conference men's basketball standings
	Conf.				Overall
Team	W		L	PCT	W		L	PCT
No. 4 Indiana	12	–	2	.857	20	–	4	.833
No. 13 Iowa	11	–	3	.786	17	–	5	.773
No. 19 Illinois	10	–	4	.714	17	–	5	.773
Minnesota	10	–	4	.714	17	–	5	.773
Wisconsin	6	–	8	.429	12	–	10	.545
Northwestern	6	–	8	.429	9	–	13	.409
Ohio State	5	–	9	.357	11	–	11	.500
Michigan State	4	–	10	.286	9	–	13	.409
Michigan	3	–	11	.214	9	–	13	.409
Purdue	3	–	11	.214	9	–	13	.409
Rankings from AP Poll

The 1953–54 Wisconsin Badgers men's basketball team represented University of Wisconsin–Madison. The head coach was Harold E. Foster, coaching his twentieth season with the Badgers. The team played their home games at the UW Fieldhouse in Madison, Wisconsin and was a member of the Big Ten Conference.

== Schedule ==
Date time, TV	Rank^{#}	Opponent^{#}	Result	Record	Site city, state
Regular Season
12/01/1953*		Butler	W 70–54	1–0	UW Fieldhouse; Madison, Wisconsin
12/04/1953*		at Marquette	W 64–56	2–0	Marquette Gymnasium; Milwaukee
12/07/1953*		at Loyola (IL)	W 75–54	3–0	Alumni Gym; Chicago
12/12/1953*		Missouri	W 64–53	4–0	UW Fieldhouse; Madison, Wisconsin
12/14/1953*		Oklahoma	L 65–69	4–1	UW Fieldhouse; Madison, Wisconsin
12/19/1953*		at LSU	W 82–66	5–1	John M. Parker Agricultural Coliseum; Baton Rouge, Louisiana
12/21/1953*	No. 18	at Tulane	L 55–57 ^{OT}	5–2	Tulane Gym; New Orleans
12/28/1953*		Denver	W 67–48	6–2	UW Fieldhouse; Madison, Wisconsin
1/02/1954		Purdue	W 66–57	7–2 (1–0)	UW Fieldhouse; Madison, Wisconsin
1/04/1954		at Indiana	L 67–70	7–3 (1–1)	The Fieldhouse; Bloomington, Indiana
1/09/1954		at Iowa	L 54–71	7–4 (1–2)	Iowa Field House; Iowa City, IA
1/11/1954		Northwestern	W 64–47	8–4 (2–2)	UW Fieldhouse; Madison, Wisconsin
1/16/1954		Indiana	L 74–90	8–5 (2–3)	UW Fieldhouse; Madison, Wisconsin
1/18/1954		at Michigan State	W 57–53	9–5 (3–3)	Jenison Fieldhouse; East Lansing, Michigan
2/06/1954		at Ohio State	W 79–73	10–5 (4–3)	Ohio Expo Center Coliseum; Columbus, Ohio
2/13/1954		Illinois	L 64–70 ^{OT}	10–6 (4–4)	UW Fieldhouse; Madison, Wisconsin
2/15/1954		Minnesota	L 68–78	10–7 (4–5)	UW Fieldhouse; Madison, Wisconsin
2/20/1954		Michigan	W 77–56	11–7 (5–5)	UW Fieldhouse; Madison, Wisconsin
2/22/1954		at Illinois	L 64–66	11–8 (5–6)	Huff Hall; Champaign, Illinois
2/27/1954		at Purdue	L 66–71	11–9 (5–7)	Lambert Fieldhouse; West Lafayette, Indiana
3/01/1954		Michigan State	W 79–56	12–9 (6–7)	UW Fieldhouse; Madison, Wisconsin
3/06/1954		at Minnesota	L 73–78	12–10 (6–8)	Williams Arena; Minneapolis
*Non-conference game. ^{#}Rankings from AP Poll. (#) Tournament seedings in parentheses.
