= 1953–54 USC Trojans men's basketball team =

American college basketball season

1953–54 USC Trojans men's basketball
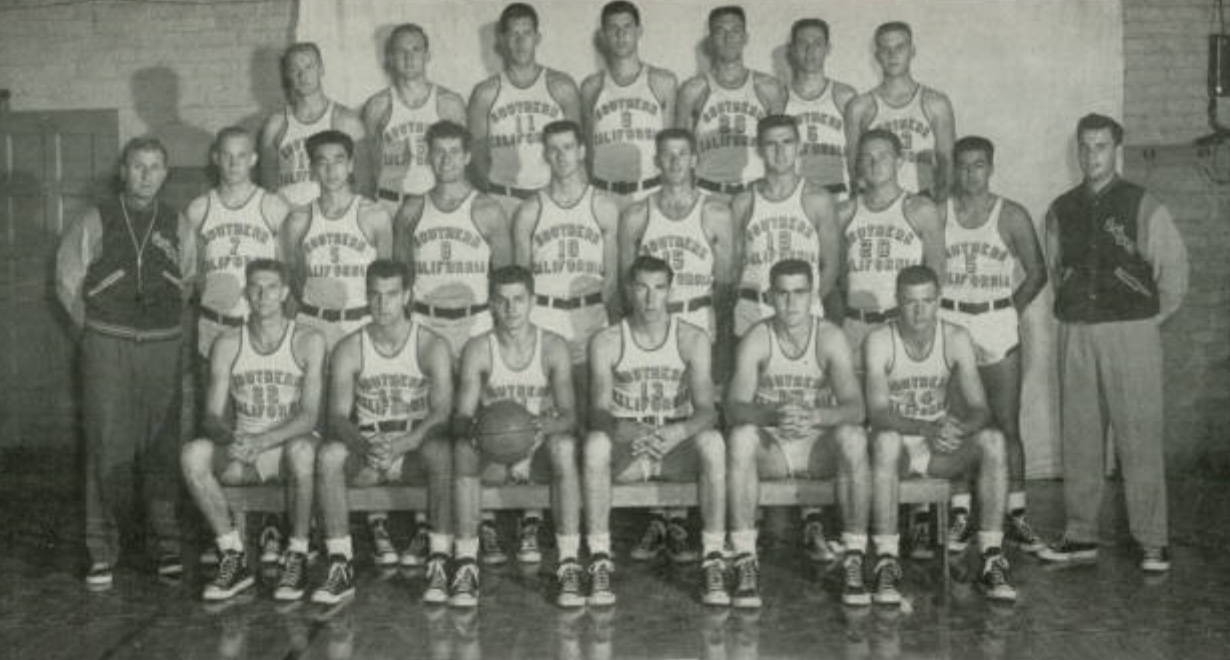

PCC Champions

NCAA tournament, Final Four
- Conference: Pacific Coast Conference

Ranking
- AP: No. 11
- Record: 19–14 (8–4 PCC)
- Head coach: Forrest Twogood (4th season)
- Home arena: Pan-Pacific Auditorium

1953–54 Pacific Coast Conference men's basketball standings
	Conf.				Overall
Team	W		L	PCT	W		L	PCT
North
Oregon State	11	–	5	.688	22	–	8	.733
Idaho	9	–	7	.563	15	–	8	.652
Oregon	9	–	7	.563	17	–	10	.630
Washington	7	–	9	.438	8	–	18	.308
Washington State	4	–	12	.250	10	–	17	.370
South
No. 11 USC †	8	–	4	.667	19	–	14	.576
UCLA	7	–	5	.583	18	–	7	.720
California	6	–	6	.500	17	–	7	.708
Stanford	3	–	9	.250	15	–	10	.600
† Conference playoff series winner Rankings from AP Poll

The 1953–54 USC Trojans men's basketball team represented the University of Southern California during the 1953–54 NCAA college basketball season. Members of the Pacific Coast Conference, the Trojans were led by fourth-year head coach Forrest Twogood and played their home games off campus at Pan-Pacific Auditorium in Los Angeles, California.

The Trojans were 15–11 overall in the regular season and 8–4 in conference play. They won the Southern Division for the first time since 1940 and met Northern Division champion Oregon State in the best-of-three PCC playoff series at Long Beach City College. USC won the first and third games and advanced to the 24-team NCAA tournament.

At the West Regional at Gill Coliseum in Corvallis, Oregon, the Trojans defeated Idaho State and Santa Clara (in double overtime). At the Final Four in Kansas City, Missouri, the Trojans dropped both games, to Bradley in the semifinals and Penn State in the consolation game.

== NCAA tournament ==
Seeding in brackets

- West Regional at Corvallis, Oregon
  - Southern California 73, Idaho State 59
  - Southern California 66, Santa Clara 65 (2OT)
- Final Four at Kansas City, Missouri
  - Bradley 74, Southern California 72
  - Penn State 70, Southern California 61 – (Third-place game)

== NBA draft ==
One Trojan was selected in the 1954 NBA draft

Round	Pick	Player	NBA club
9	78	Roy Irvin	Rochester Royals
