= Red Brown (basketball) =

American basketball coach

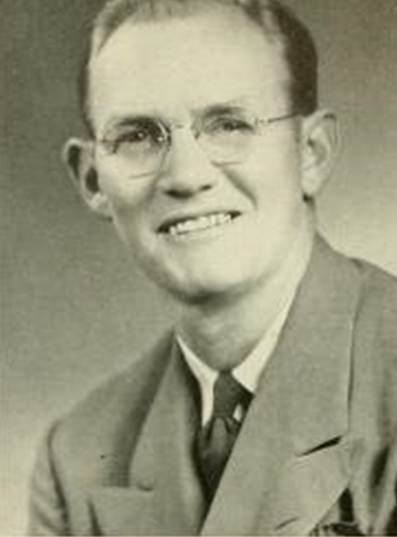

Biographical details
- Born: April 14, 1907
- Died: June 8, 1992 (aged 85); Morgantown, West Virginia, U.S.

Playing career

Basketball
- 1926–1930: Davis & Elkins
- Position: Forward

Coaching career (HC unless noted)

Basketball
- 1945–1947: West Virginia (assistant)
- 1947–1950: Davis & Elkins
- 1950–1954: West Virginia

Football
- 1947–1949: Davis & Elkins

Administrative career (AD unless noted)
- 1954–1972: West Virginia

Head coaching record
- Overall: 142–52 (basketball); 13–12 (football)

Robert Nathan "Red" Brown (April 14, 1907 – June 8, 1992) was an American college basketball and college football coach and athletics administrator. He was the head basketball coach at Davis & Elkins College from 1947 to 1950 and West Virginia University from 1950 to 1954.

== Head coaching record ==
=== Football ===
Year	Team	Overall	Conference	Standing	Bowl/playoffs
Davis & Elkins Senators (West Virginia Intercollegiate Athletic Conference) (1947–1949)
1947	Davis & Elkins	4–4	4–3	5th	
1948	Davis & Elkins	7–2	7–2	3rd	
1949	Davis & Elkins	2–6	2–6	T–8th	
Davis & Elkins:		13–12	13–11		
Total:		13–12			
