= 1953–54 NCAA men's basketball rankings =

- Season: 1953–54
- NCAA Tournament: 1954
- Preseason No. 1: Indiana
- NCAA Tournament Champions: La Salle
NCAA men's basketball rankings


The 1953–54 NCAA men's basketball rankings was made up of two human polls, the AP Poll and the Coaches Poll, as well as the Dunkel System math ratings.

== Legend ==
	Increase in ranking
	Decrease in ranking
	New to rankings from previous week
Italics	Number of first place votes
(#–#)	Win–loss record
т	Tied with team above or below also with this symbol

== AP Poll ==
	Preseason	Week 1 Dec. 15	Week 2 Dec. 22	Week 3 Dec. 29	Week 4 Jan. 5	Week 5 Jan. 12	Week 6 Jan. 19	Week 7 Jan. 26	Week 8 Feb. 2	Week 9 Feb. 9	Week 10 Feb. 16	Week 11 Feb. 23	Week 12 Mar. 2	Week 13 Mar. 9	Final Mar. 23 (post-tournaments)	
1.	Indiana	Indiana (3–0)	Indiana (6–0)	Kentucky (6–0)	Kentucky (7–0)	Kentucky (9–0)	Kentucky (11–0)	Kentucky (12–0)	Kentucky (13–0)	Kentucky (16–0)	Duquesne (19–0)	Duquesne (21–0)	Kentucky (23–0)	Kentucky (24–0)	Kentucky (25–0) (71)	1.
2.	Kentucky	Kentucky (2–0)	Kentucky (5–0)	Duquesne (8–0)	Duquesne (11–0)	Duquesne (13–0)	Duquesne (15–0)	Duquesne (15–0)	Duquesne (17–0)	Duquesne (18–0)	Kentucky (18–0)	Kentucky (21–0)	Indiana (18–3)	Indiana (19–3)	La Salle (26–4) (33)	2.
3.	Duquesne	Duquesne (4–0)	Duquesne (7–0)	Indiana (6–1)	Indiana (7–1)	Indiana (9–1)	Indiana (12–1)	Indiana (12–1)	Indiana (12–1)	Indiana (14–1)	Indiana (15–2)	Indiana (17–2)	Western Kentucky (28–1)	Duquesne (24–2)	Holy Cross (26–2) (15)	3.
4.	Oklahoma A&M	Illinois (4–0)	Illinois (5–1)	Oregon State (6–1)	Oklahoma A&M (12–1)	Oklahoma A&M (13–1)	Western Kentucky (16–0)	Oklahoma A&M (16–1)	Western Kentucky (19–0)	Oklahoma A&M (18–1)	Western Kentucky (23–1)	Western Kentucky (25–1)	Duquesne (22–2)	Western Kentucky (28–1)	Indiana (20–4) (9)	4.
5.	Kansas	LSU (3–0)	Oklahoma A&M (8–1)	Oklahoma A&M (9–1)	Western Kentucky (12–0)	Western Kentucky (14–0)	Oklahoma A&M (15–1)	Western Kentucky (18–0)	Oklahoma A&M (17–1)	Western Kentucky (21–1)	Oklahoma A&M (20–2)	Oklahoma A&M (21–2)	Notre Dame (19–2)	Oklahoma A&M (23–4)	Duquesne (26–3) (1)	5.
6.	La Salle	Minnesota (3–0)	Western Kentucky (9–0)	Minnesota (7–0)	Minnesota (8–1)	Holy Cross (10–0)	Notre Dame (9–2)	Notre Dame (10–2)	Seattle (20–1)	Notre Dame (12–2)	Notre Dame (13–2)	Notre Dame (16–2)	Oklahoma A&M (21–4)	Notre Dame (20–2)	Notre Dame (22–3) (3)	6.
7.	NC State	Oklahoma A&M (4–1)	Fordham (6–0)	Western Kentucky (9–0)	Holy Cross (8–0)	George Washington (10–0)	Oklahoma City (11–1)	Holy Cross (13–1)	Notre Dame (10–2)	La Salle (17–3)	Seattle (24–1)	Holy Cross (20–1)	LSU (19–2)	George Washington (23–2)	Bradley (19–13)	7.
8.	Kansas State	NC State (3–1)	Minnesota (5–0)	Illinois (5–1)	Duke (9–3)	Oklahoma City (9–1)	Holy Cross (12–1)	Minnesota (10–2)	Duke (13–4)	Seattle (23–1)	George Washington (16–1)	George Washington (18–1)	La Salle (21–4)	LSU (20–2)	Western Kentucky (29–3)	8.
9.	Illinois	Fordham (4–0)	NC State (6–1)	NC State (7–1)	Oklahoma City (8–1)	Duke (12–3)	Minnesota (9–2)	Oklahoma City (11–2)	La Salle (15–3)	Holy Cross (16–1)	Holy Cross (17–1)	Seattle (24–1)	George Washington (20–2)	Holy Cross (23–2)	Penn State (18–6)	9.
10.	LSU	Western Kentucky (6–0)	Holy Cross (3–0)	Fordham (6–0)	Oregon State (7–3)	Minnesota (8–2)	George Washington (11–1)	George Washington (12–1)	Holy Cross (14–1)	George Washington (13–1)	Iowa (14–3)	Duke (19–5)	Seattle (26–1)	NC State (24–6)	Oklahoma A&M (24–5) (1)	10.
11.	Western Kentucky	Oregon State (6–1)	Rice (6–0)	Oklahoma City (6–0)	Rice (10–0)	Kansas (6–2)	Wichita (15–1)	Seattle (16–1)	George Washington (12–1)	Maryland (17–4)	Maryland (20–4)	Maryland (21–5)	Duke (21–5)	Seattle (26–1)	USC (20–11)	11.
12.	Minnesota	Oklahoma City (4–0)	Oregon State (6–1)	Holy Cross (5–0)	Niagara (8–2) т	Wichita (14–1)	LSU (11–2)	La Salle (15–3)	Minnesota (12–2)	Minnesota (13–2)	La Salle (18–4)	LSU (17–2)	Wichita (25–3)	La Salle (21–4)	George Washington (23–3) (2)	12.
13.	Oregon State	Duke (3–1)	UCLA (6–1)	La Salle (7–2)	George Washington (6–0) т	Niagara (12–1)	Duke (12–4)	Maryland (13–4)	Maryland (15–4)	Oklahoma City (12–4)	LSU (15–2)	La Salle (20–4)	Holy Cross (22–2)	Kansas (16–4)	Iowa (17–5) (2)	13.
14.	Wyoming	Holy Cross (2–0)	LSU (4–1)	UCLA (8–1)	Dayton (9–2)	Seattle (11–1)	Maryland (13–4)	California (14–2)	Wichita (19–2)	California (16–2)	Duke (16–5)	Wichita (23–3)	Dayton (24–6)	Maryland (23–7)	LSU (20–5)	14.
15.	Dayton	California (3–1)	Oklahoma City (5–0)	Seattle (8–1)	Illinois (6–2)	Rice (10–2)	California (14–2)	LSU (11–2)	California (16–2)	Duke (14–5)	Wichita (22–3)	Oklahoma City (14–5)	Kansas (15–4)	Dayton (25–6)	Duke (22–6)	15.
16.	Santa Clara	Notre Dame (3–1)	La Salle (6–1) т	Rice (7–0)	Kansas (4–2)	LSU (10–2)	Seattle (14–1)	Kansas (8–3) т	Oklahoma City (11–4)	Navy (14–4)	Oklahoma City (13–5)	Dayton (22–5)	Iowa (16–5)	Iowa (17–5)	Niagara (24–6) (1)	16.
17.	California	UCLA (3–0)	Dayton (6–1) т	Idaho (5–0)	Seattle (9–1)	Dayton (11–2)	Kansas (8–3)	Wichita (16–2) т	LSU (13–2)	LSU (14–2)	Dayton (20–5)	Kansas (13–4)	Maryland (22–6)	Oregon State (18–10)	Seattle (26–2)	17.
18.	Saint Louis	Niagara (4–1)	Wisconsin (5–1)	LSU (5–1)	Navy (7–2)	Colorado State (11–1)	Niagara (10–3)	Connecticut (14–0)	Bradley (11–5)	Wichita (20–3)	Minnesota (14–4)	Colorado State (20–4)	NC State (19–6)	Duke (22–6)	Kansas (16–5)	18.
19.	Holy Cross т	Siena (3–1)	Notre Dame (4–1)	BYU (8–0)	Vanderbilt (7–1)	Illinois (8–3)	La Salle (14–3)	Dayton (14–4)	Kansas (8–3)	NC State (15–5)	Colorado State (17–4)	UCLA (18–5)	Connecticut (21–2)	Colorado State (22–5)	Illinois (17–5)	19.
20.	Oklahoma City т	La Salle (3–1)	Idaho (5–0) т Vanderbilt (5–0) т	Wyoming (6–1) т Vanderbilt (5–1) т	NC State (9–3)	Idaho (8–3)	Illinois (9–4)	Duke (12–4)	Louisville (14–5)	Kansas (9–4)	Navy (15–5)	Illinois (16–4) т Iowa (16–5) т	Louisville (21–6)	Wichita (27–4)	Maryland (28–7)	20.
	Preseason	Week 1 Dec. 15	Week 2 Dec. 22	Week 3 Dec. 29	Week 4 Jan. 5	Week 5 Jan. 12	Week 6 Jan. 19	Week 7 Jan. 26	Week 8 Feb. 2	Week 9 Feb. 9	Week 10 Feb. 16	Week 11 Feb. 23	Week 12 Mar. 2	Week 13 Mar. 9	Final Mar. 23 (post-tournaments)	
		Dropped: Kansas (0–2); Kansas State (2–1); Wyoming (4–1); Dayton; Santa Clara; Saint Louis (4–1)	Dropped: Duke; California (5–1); Niagara; Siena	Dropped: Dayton; Wisconsin; Notre Dame	Dropped: Fordham; La Salle; UCLA; Idaho; LSU; BYU; Wyoming	Dropped: Oregon State; Navy; Vanderbilt; NC State	Dropped: Rice; Dayton; Colorado State; Idaho	Dropped: Niagara; Illinois	Dropped: Connecticut; Dayton	Dropped: Bradley; Louisville	Dropped: California; NC State; Kansas	Dropped: Minnesota; Navy	Dropped: Oklahoma City; Colorado State (22–4); UCLA (18–7); Illinois (16–4)	Dropped: Connecticut; Louisville	Dropped: NC State; Dayton; Oregon State; Colorado State; Wichita	

== UP Poll ==
All UP polls for this season included 20 teams, with the exception of the final poll (released on March 9, 1954) which included only 10 teams.

	Preseason	Week 1 Dec. 15	Week 2 Dec. 22	Week 3 Dec. 29	Week 4 Jan. 5	Week 5 Jan. 12	Week 6 Jan. 19	Week 7 Jan. 26	Week 8 Feb. 2	Week 9 Feb. 9	Week 10 Feb. 16	Week 11 Feb. 23	Week 12 Mar. 2	Final Mar. 9	
1.	Indiana	Indiana (3–0)	Indiana (6–0)	Kentucky (6–0)	Kentucky (7–0)	Kentucky (9–0)	Kentucky (11–0)	Kentucky (12–0)	Kentucky (13–0)	Indiana (14–1)	Duquesne (19–0)	Duquesne (21–0)	Kentucky (23–0)	Indiana (19–3)	1.
2.	Kentucky	Kentucky (2–0)	Kentucky (5–0)	Indiana (6–1)	Indiana (7–1)	Indiana (9–1)	Indiana (12–1)	Indiana (12–1)	Indiana (12–1)	Duquesne (18–0)	Kentucky (18–0)	Indiana (17–2)	Indiana (18–3)	Kentucky (24–0)	2.
3.	Duquesne	Duquesne (4–0)	Duquesne (7–0)	Duquesne (8–0)	Duquesne (11–0)	Duquesne (13–0)	Duquesne (15–0)	Duquesne (15–0)	Duquesne (17–0)	Kentucky (16–0)	Indiana (15–2)	Kentucky (21–0)	Duquesne (22–2)	Duquesne (24–2)	3.
4.	Kansas	Illinois (4–0)	Illinois (5–1)	Oregon State (6–1)	Oklahoma A&M (12–1)	Oklahoma A&M (13–1)	Oklahoma A&M (15–1)	Oklahoma A&M (16–1)	Oklahoma A&M (17–1)	Oklahoma A&M (18–1)	Oklahoma A&M (20–2)	Oklahoma A&M (21–2)	Western Kentucky (28–1)	Oklahoma A&M (23–4)	4.
5.	Oklahoma A&M	LSU (3–0)	Minnesota (5–0)	Oklahoma A&M (9–1)	Minnesota (8–1)	Holy Cross (10–0)	Western Kentucky (16–0)	Western Kentucky (18–0)	Western Kentucky (19–0)	Minnesota (13–2)	Western Kentucky (23–1)	Western Kentucky (25–1)	Oklahoma A&M (21–4)	Notre Dame (20–2)	5.
6.	La Salle	Minnesota (3–0)	Oklahoma A&M (8–1)	Minnesota (7–0)	Holy Cross (8–0)	Western Kentucky (14–0)	Minnesota (9–2)	Minnesota (10–2)	Minnesota (12–2)	Western Kentucky (21–1)	Holy Cross (17–1)	Holy Cross (20–1)	Notre Dame (19–2)	Western Kentucky (28–1)	6.
7.	LSU	Oklahoma A&M (4–1)	NC State (6–1)	Illinois (5–1)	Western Kentucky (12–0)	Kansas (6–2)	California (14–2)	California (14–2)	California (16–2)	California (16–2)	Iowa (14–3)	Notre Dame (16–2)	Kansas (15–4)	Kansas (16–4)	7.
8.	NC State	NC State (3–1)	UCLA (6–1)	NC State (7–1)	Kansas (4–2)	Minnesota (8–2)	Kansas (8–3)	Notre Dame (10–2)	Holy Cross (14–1)	Notre Dame (12–2) т	Notre Dame (13–2)	LSU (17–2)	Holy Cross (22–2)	LSU (20–2)	8.
9.	Minnesota	UCLA (3–0)	Fordham (6–0)	Fordham (6–0)	Illinois (6–2)	Duke (12–3) т	Notre Dame (9–2)	Kansas (8–3)	Notre Dame (10–2)	Holy Cross (16–1) т	LSU (15–2)	Kansas (13–4)	LSU (19–2)	Holy Cross (23–2)	9.
10.	California	Fordham (4–0)	La Salle (6–1)	BYU (8–0)	Rice (10–0)	California (12–1) т	LSU (11–2)	Holy Cross (13–1)	Kansas (8–3)	La Salle (17–3)	Kansas (12–4)	La Salle (20–4)	La Salle (21–4)	Iowa (17–5)	10.
11.	Illinois	La Salle (3–1)	Oregon State (6–1)	Western Kentucky (9–0)	Oregon State (7–3)	Niagara (10–2)	Duke (12–4)	La Salle (15–3)	LSU (13–2)	Kansas (9–4)	La Salle (18–4)	UCLA (18–5) т	Iowa (16–5)		11.
12.	Kansas State	California (3–1)	LSU (4–1) т	La Salle (7–2)	LSU (6–2)	LSU (10–2)	Oklahoma City (11–1) т	LSU (11–2)	La Salle (15–3)	LSU (14–2)	Minnesota (14–4)	Illinois (16–4) т	Duke (21–5)		12.
13.	Saint Louis	Kansas (0–2)	California (5–1) т	LSU (5–1)	Duke (9–3)	La Salle (11–3)	Holy Cross (12–1) т	Wyoming (14–3)	Duke (13–4)	Duke (14–5)	Duke (16–5) т	George Washington (18–1)	Colorado State (22–4)		13.
14.	Holy Cross	Notre Dame (3–1)	Western Kentucky (9–0)	UCLA (8–1) т	Niagara (8–2)	Rice (11–1)	Wichita (15–1)	Duke (12–4)	Iowa (11–3) т	Seattle (23–1) т	California (16–4) т	Duke (19–5)	Illinois (16–4)		14.
15.	Oregon State	Oregon State (6–1)	Wisconsin (5–1)	Rice (7–0) т	UCLA (9–2)	Illinois (8–3)	NC State (11–4)	Iowa (10–3)	NC State (12–5) т	Iowa (12–3) т	George Washington (16–1)	Seattle (24–1)	Wichita (25–3)		15.
16.	Dayton	Ohio State (3–0)	Wyoming (6–1)	Holy Cross (5–0)	NC State (9–3) т	NC State (10–3)	Illinois (9–4) т	Oklahoma City (11–2)	Wyoming (15–4)	NC State (15–5)	Seattle (24–1)	Colorado State (20–4)	Seattle (26–1)		16.
17.	Wyoming	Holy Cross (2–0)	Rice (6–0) т	Wyoming (6–1)	La Salle (9–3) т	Notre Dame (7–2)	Oregon State (10–4) т	Oregon State (11–5)	Bradley (11–5)	Colorado State (15–4) т	UCLA (13–5)	Wichita (23–3)	NC State (19–6)		17.
18.	Santa Clara	Western Kentucky (6–0) т	Kansas (1–2) т	California (9–1)	Navy (7–2)	Oklahoma City (9–1)	Niagara (10–3)	Texas (9–4)	Wichita (19–2) т	Oregon State (14–6) т	Colorado State (17–4)	Iowa (16–5) т	Dayton (24–6) т		18.
19.	Notre Dame	Saint Louis (4–1) т	Holy Cross (3–0)	Kansas State (5–2)	Oklahoma City (8–1)	Wyoming (10–3)	La Salle (14–3) т	Bradley (11–4)	Louisville (14–5) т	Fordham (14–2)	Wichita (22–3)	Rice (18–3) т	Minnesota (16–5) т		19.
20.	UCLA	Kansas State (2–1) т Wyoming (4–1) т	Notre Dame (4–1)	Navy (6–0)	California (9–1)	Wichita (14–1) т Oregon State (8–4) т	Wyoming (13–3) т	NC State (12–5)	Illinois (9–4) т	George Washington (13–1)	NC State (16–6)	NC State (16–6)	Oregon State (18–8) т UCLA (18–7) т Minnesota (15–11) т		20.
	Preseason	Week 1 Dec. 15	Week 2 Dec. 22	Week 3 Dec. 29	Week 4 Jan. 5	Week 5 Jan. 12	Week 6 Jan. 19	Week 7 Jan. 26	Week 8 Feb. 2	Week 9 Feb. 9	Week 10 Feb. 16	Week 11 Feb. 23	Week 12 Mar. 2	Final Mar. 9	
		Dropped: Dayton; Santa Clara	Dropped: Ohio State; Saint Louis; Kansas State	Dropped: Wisconsin; Kansas; Notre Dame	Dropped: Fordham; BYU; Wyoming; Kansas State	Dropped: UCLA; Navy	None	Dropped: Wichita; Illinois; Niagara	Dropped: Oklahoma City; Oregon State; Texas	Dropped: Wyoming; Bradley; Wichita; Louisville; Illinois	Dropped: Oregon State; Fordham	Dropped: Minnesota; California	Dropped: Rice	Dropped: La Salle; Duke; Colorado State; Illinois; Wichita; Seattle; NC State; Dayton; Minnesota (16–5); Oregon State; UCLA; Minnesota	

== Dunkel Ratings ==
The Dunkel System college basketball ratings were released throughout the season. The final post-tournament ratings were released in April 1954, with undefeated Kentucky, who did not compete in a post-season tournament, ahead of NIT winner Holy Cross, NIT runner-up Duquesne, and NCAA tournament winner La Salle.

	Final April 1954	
1.	Kentucky - 88.0	1.
2.	Holy Cross	2.
3.	Duquesne	3.
4.	LaSalle	4.
5.	Indiana	5.
6.	Iowa	6.
7.	Illinois	7.
8.	Niagara	8.
9.	Western Kentucky	9.
10.	Duke	10.
	Final April 1954	
