= 1939 NCAA basketball championship game =

Inaugural college basketball national championship game

1939 NCAA Tournament Championship Game
National championship game
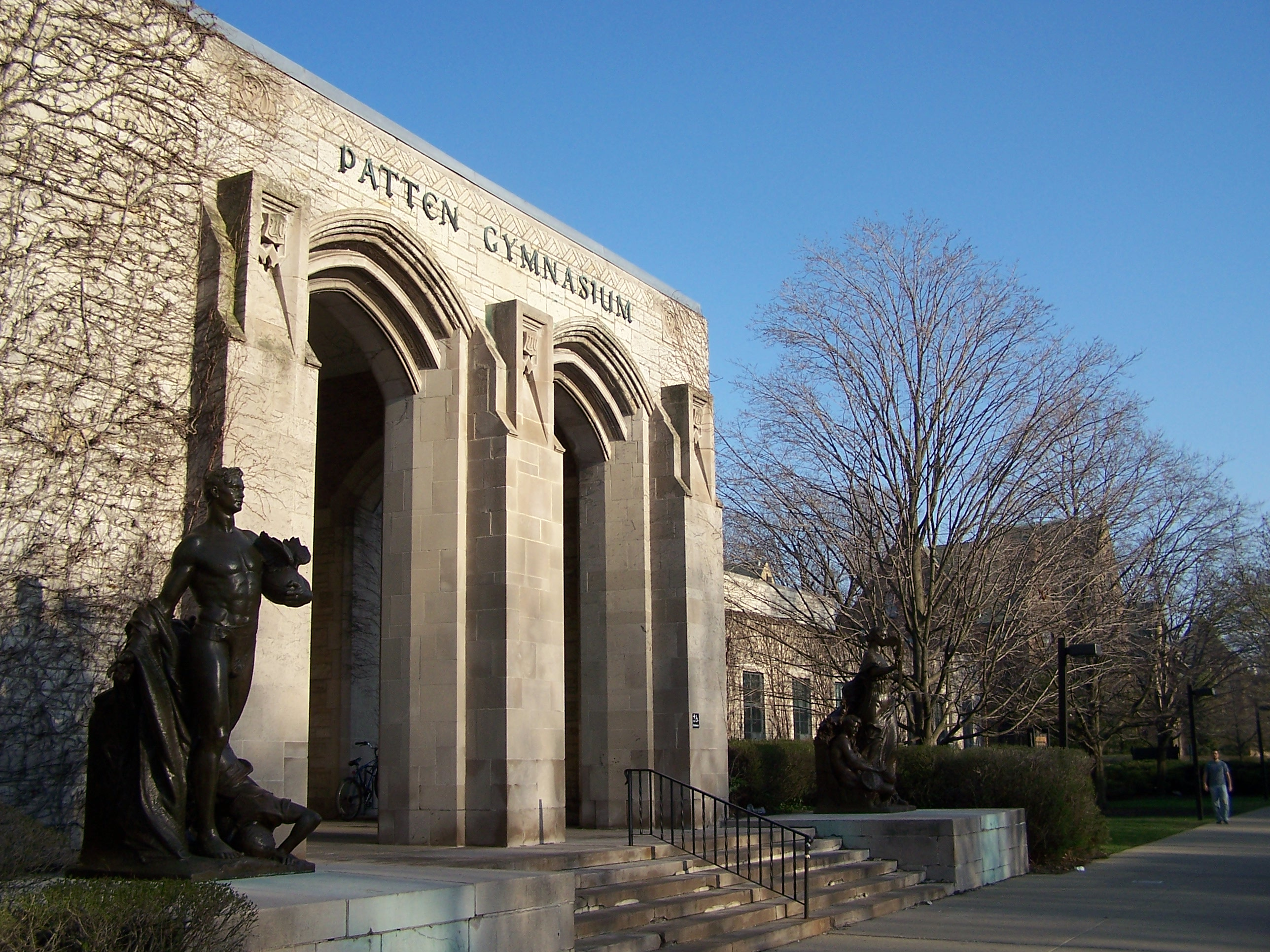
- The Patten Gymnasium in Evanston, Illinois, hosted the first national championship game.
Oregon Webfoots	Ohio State Buckeyes
PCC	Big Ten
(28–5)	(16–6)
46	33
Head coach: Howard Hobson	Head coach: Harold Olsen
	1st half	2nd half	Total
Oregon Webfoots	21	25	46
Ohio State Buckeyes	16	17	33
- Date: March 27, 1939
- Venue: Patten Gymnasium, Evanston, Illinois
- Referees: Lyle Clarno and John Getchell
- Attendance: 4,400–5,500

The 1939 NCAA Basketball Championship Game was the final of the 1939 NCAA basketball tournament and the first NCAA tournament title game. The contest was held on March 27, 1939, at Patten Gymnasium in Evanston, Illinois, and determined the national champion in the 1938–39 NCAA men's basketball season. The Ohio State Buckeyes, the champions of the Big Ten Conference, faced the Oregon Webfoots, winners of the Pacific Coast Conference (PCC). Oregon won the game, 46–33, to claim the school's only national championship in men's college basketball.

== Background ==
=== First NCAA Tournament ===
The inaugural National Invitation Tournament (NIT) was held in 1938. The following season, a second postseason college basketball tournament was founded: the NCAA Tournament, which was originally organized by the National Association of Basketball Coaches (NABC), although the NCAA did consider the event its basketball championship. The concept of the tournament was pitched to the association by Ohio State coach Harold Olsen. In October 1938, the NCAA announced that it approved the tournament's creation, as long as it was run by the NABC. The tournament featured an eight-team field, consisting of conference champions. The teams were divided into East and West regions.

Seeking to control the amount of travel teams would face, the NABC decided to select the location of the championship game in advance. However, it did not do so until three weeks remained before the scheduled date of the contest. The site chosen was Patten Gymnasium in Evanston, Illinois, on the campus of Northwestern University. Olsen, the tournament committee chairman, made the arrangements for the arena to be used, as it was located in the center of the U.S. and could be procured with the NABC's available budget.

=== Ohio State ===
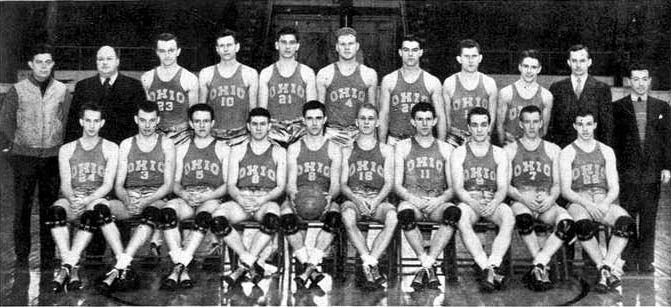
Ohio State team

Olsen was the head coach of Ohio State in 1938–39; it was his 17th season in the position. The Buckeyes were coming off a 1937–38 season in which they finished third in the Big 10 with a 5–5 conference win–loss record and had an overall mark of 12–8. The team's captain was senior Jimmy Hull. a guard who made the All-Big 10 team. Other regular starters on the Buckeyes' roster included center John Schick, Dick Baker, Dick Boughner, and Bob Lynch. The team won its first game, 43–37, against George Washington on December 10 before embarking on a six-game trip to California and Washington.

In their six West Coast games, the Buckeyes lost four times. Two losses came against Washington, while the other two defeats were to California; Ohio State did manage two victories over UCLA and finished the road trip at 3–4. The team's play improved during the Big Ten Conference schedule, as its only losses were to Illinois and Indiana; the latter team held the lead in the conference standings until a February 27 loss to Purdue. That day, the Buckeyes defeated Michigan to climb into a tie for first with Indiana, as both teams had two losses in conference play entering their final games. On March 4, the Buckeyes posted a 16-point win over Purdue, behind a 20-point effort from Hull, while Michigan defeated Indiana 53–45. These results clinched the Big Ten title for Ohio State.

The selection committee for Ohio State's district—which included Ohio and several other Midwestern states—originally offered Bradley its NCAA Tournament invitation, but that school turned the bid down to participate in the NIT, where it finished third. The Buckeyes were the committee's second choice, and accepted the invitation despite Hull's later statement that the players "were not interested in playing in this tournament", due to fatigue and the tournament's perceived lack of standing at the time. In their first NCAA Tournament game, the Buckeyes faced Wake Forest. A 64–52 victory sent them to the national semifinals, where Villanova opposed them. Ohio State won by a 17-point margin to advance to the NCAA title game. The win gave the Buckeyes a season record of 16–6.

=== Oregon ===
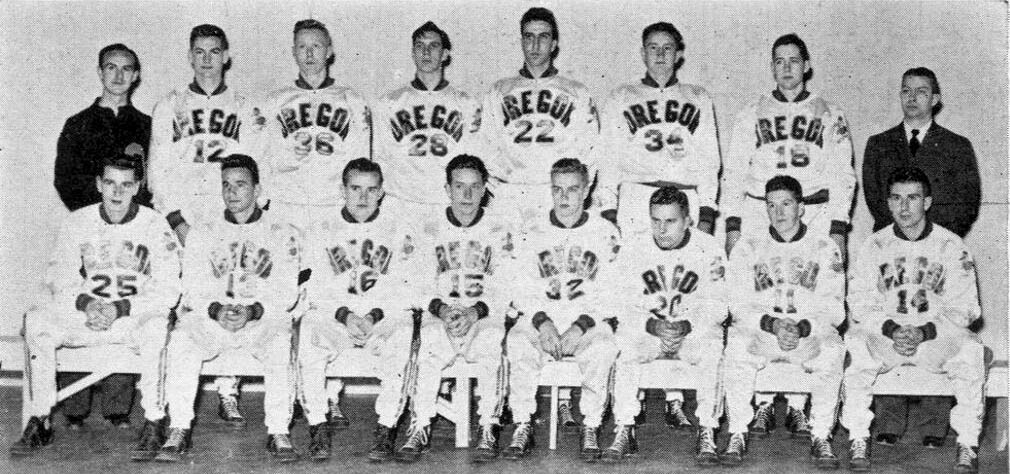
Oregon team

The 1938–39 Webfoots were coached by Howard Hobson, who was in his fourth season as the team's head coach. The previous season, Oregon had won the PCC's North division with a 14–6 record in conference play, before losing to Stanford in the best-of-three PCC championship series. The Webfoots returned all five starters from the 1937–38 team: center Slim Wintermute, forwards Lauren Gale and John H. Dick, and guards Bobby Anet and Wally Johansen. The team was nicknamed the "Tall Firs" due to its collective height, and employed a fast-paced style of play. The Webfoots began their season on November 29, 1938, with a 51–24 win over Portland, and won their next three games by double-digit margins.

Oregon went on a tour of the Eastern United States, which started at Madison Square Garden with a game against City College of New York. The Webfoots suffered their first loss of the season, 38–36. The December 17 game was followed by numerous stops in cities such as Chicago, Detroit, and Philadelphia over the following two weeks. After a four-game winning streak, Oregon lost for the second time, falling to Bradley 52–39 on December 26. The Webfoots won twice over the next three days, before traveling to San Francisco to face Stanford on December 31, losing by a 50–46 margin.

In conference play, the Webfoots had a 14–2 record, finishing three games ahead of Washington for first place in the North division. Oregon reached the PCC championship series, where they faced California. The Webfoots posted a five-point win in the first game, before beating California again by a 53–47 score to claim the conference championship and earn the PCC's NCAA Tournament berth. The Webfoots' first NCAA Tournament game came against Texas, and a 56–41 win earned them a place in the national semifinals. There, they defeated Oklahoma by an 18-point margin, which gave them a berth in the NCAA championship game. Oregon had a record of 28–5 entering the contest.

== Game summary ==
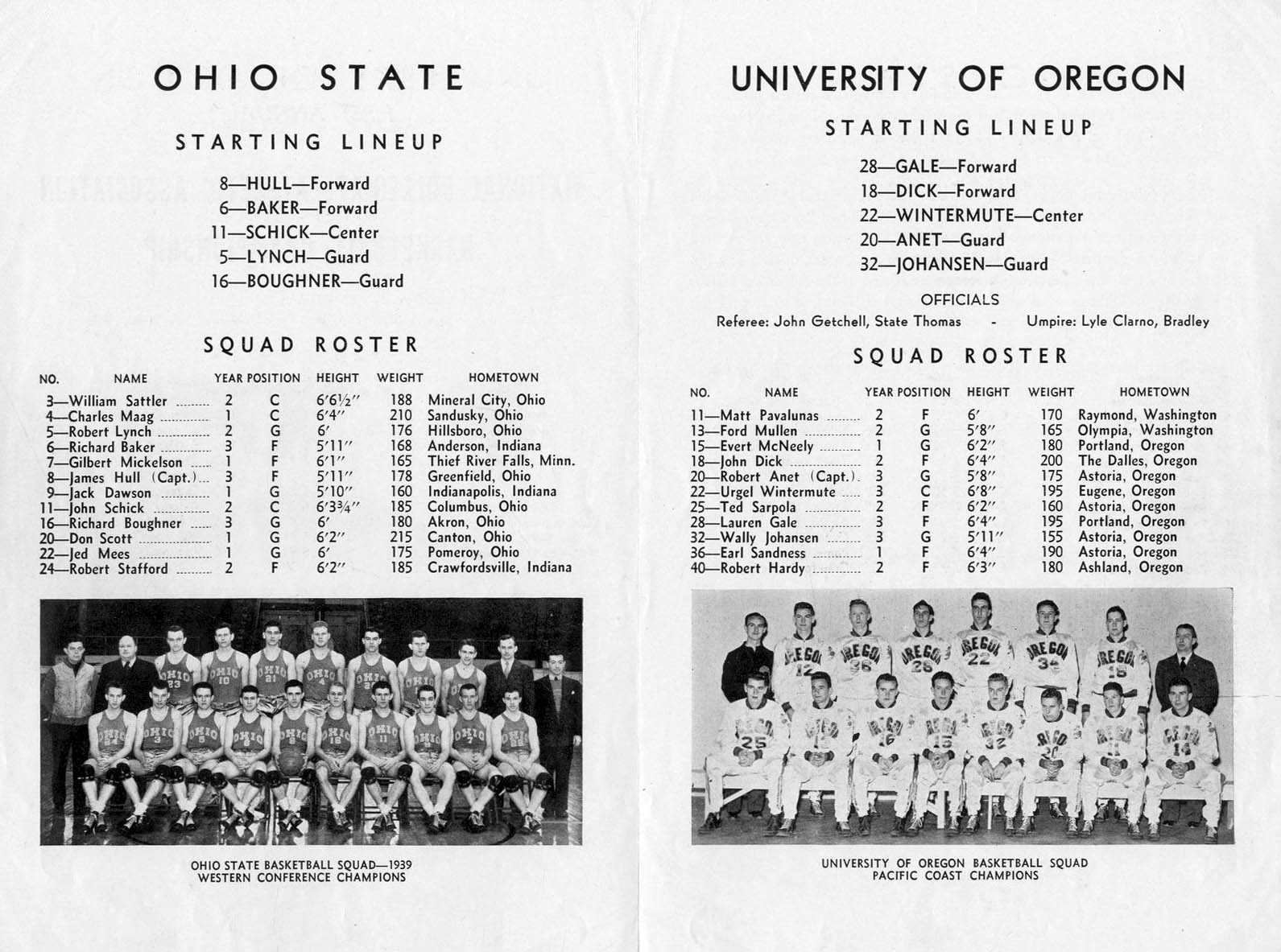
Official game program

The national championship game was held on March 27, 1939. Although attendance figures vary, the contest was not a sellout. Tim Bannon of the Chicago Tribune reported the listed attendance as 5,500, while author Terry Frei gave a figure of 5,000. A contemporary reporter for The Oregonian gave an even lower estimate of 4,400, less than half of Patten Gymnasium's capacity of 9,000. Among those at the game were about 400 college basketball coaches, who had been in Chicago for an NABC convention. Also in attendance was basketball's inventor, James Naismith.

Oregon scored the first points of the game, as Anet rebounded a missed Webfoots field goal attempt and made his subsequent shot. Anet and Dick each made one free throw, before a shot by Johansen gave Oregon an early 6–0 advantage. The Webfoots played at a fast pace from the outset, a style of play that the Buckeyes were unaccustomed to. However, the Buckeyes managed to rally. Hull scored the team's first point on a free throw at approximately the 3:30 mark, and they scored the next two baskets. A pair of baskets by Lynch brought them to within one point of the Webfoots, 12–11, before two Johansen baskets and an Anet score brought Oregon's lead up to seven. Ohio State's defensive efforts were primarily aimed at stopping Wintermute and Gale; instead of featuring those players exclusively, the Webfoots spread offensive opportunities throughout their starting lineup, and Gale later called himself "a decoy" in the game. Hull responded to Oregon's run by making a hook shot, and after Dick made a field goal attempt Ohio State scored the last two baskets of the first half. The Webfoots held a 21–16 lead at halftime.

In the first minute of the second half, Hull scored a pair of field goals to reduce the Buckeyes' deficit to a single point, 21–20. Afterwards, the Webfoots made the next four baskets, including a pair by Dick, to extend their lead to nine, about three minutes into the second half. The teams exchanged scores until Anet gave Oregon a 40–29 advantage. By this time, the Webfoots had entered into a stall, keeping the ball away from Ohio State. The Webfoots kept the lead in double digits for the rest of the game, and claimed the NCAA championship by a final score of 46–33. On behalf of the Webfoots, Anet was given the championship trophy in what Dick called "a two-handed trophy presentation". During the game, Anet had chased after a loose ball by the boundary, near the area where members of the media were located. He accidentally knocked the trophy off of a table, breaking a basketball player figure.

== Statistical summary ==
According to unofficial statistics, the Webfoots were 17-for-63 on their field goal attempts in the game. Dick scored five of the field goals and added five free throws for 15 points, the most by a player on either team. Anet added 10 points, while Johansen had 9 points and Gale added 8. With 4 points, Wintermute was the only other Oregon player to score. Ford Mullen and Matt Pavalunas also saw action for the Webfoots, but neither player added any points. The Webfoots did not call a timeout during the contest; in contrast, Ohio State stopped play five times. When asked by Hobson why he had not used a timeout, Anet said that he was reacting to pre-game instructions by Hobson that Oregon only call a timeout if they were fatigued.

The Buckeyes' shooting was less effective than that of Oregon, as Ohio State converted just 14 of its 83 field goal attempts. Despite Hull dealing with an ankle injury that he later said caused him a high level of discomfort, he topped the Buckeyes with 12 points. The team's next-highest scorers were Lynch and William Sattler, each of whom scored seven points. Four other Ohio State players added either one or two points. The Buckeyes made five of their nine free throw attempts; both figures fell short of the Webfoots' 12-for-16 free throw shooting totals.

== Aftermath ==
The 1939 NCAA Tournament's attendance figures were not high enough for the NABC to avoid losses on the event. The reported loss was $2,531; Hobson said in regard to the attendance estimate, "I think they gave half the tickets away." Lacking reserve funds, the NABC reached a deal with the NCAA in which the latter organization would take over organizing duties and provide financial backing for the tournament in later years, in exchange for underwriting the 1939 loss. Had such an agreement not taken place, the NABC intended to avoid staging a tournament in 1940. Instead, the move paved the way for the event to continue.

Ohio State finished 8–4 in Big 10 play in the 1939–40 season and did not qualify for the NCAA Tournament. The Buckeyes did not return to the tournament until 1944, when they began a three-year streak in which they reached the national semifinals annually. The team next played in the NCAA Tournament final in 1960, winning their only championship in men's college basketball. The Buckeyes have made three further appearances in national championship games, in 1961, 1962, and 2007.

The Webfoots were second in their division in 1939–40 before tying for third the next season. The 1945 NCAA Tournament was the next one in which the team appeared; Oregon lost in their first game. As of 2023, Oregon has not returned to the NCAA championship game. The program's deepest run in the tournament since 1939 came in 2017, when Oregon reached the national semifinals. Seventy-six years after the 1939 NCAA Basketball Championship Game, Oregon and Ohio State also met on January 12, 2015, in the first College Football Playoff National Championship, a game in which Ohio State defeated Oregon.

== Bibliography ==
- 2017 Men's Final Four Records Book (PDF). National Collegiate Athletic Association. 2017.
- Carlson, Chad (2017). Making March Madness: The Early Years of the NCAA, NIT, and College Basketball Championships, 1922–1951. University of Arkansas Press. ISBN 978-1-61075-615-0.
- ESPN College Basketball Encyclopedia: The Complete History of the Men's Game. Random House. 2009. ISBN 978-0-345-51392-2.
- Frei, Terry (2014). March 1939: Before the Madness: The Story of the First NCAA Basketball Tournament Champions. Taylor Trade Publishing. ISBN 978-1-58979-924-0.
- Hager, Tom (2012). The Ultimate Book of March Madness: The Players, Games, and Cinderellas that Captivated a Nation. MVP Books. ISBN 978-0-7603-4323-4.
- Ohio State 2012–13 Team Guide (PDF). Ohio State University. 2012.
- Wilner, Barry; Rappoport, Ken (2012). The Big Dance: The Story of the NCAA Basketball Tournament. Taylor Trade Publishing. ISBN 978-1-58979-621-8.
