= Oregon Ducks men's basketball =

Men's basketball team

2026–27 Oregon Ducks men's basketball team
- University: University of Oregon
- First season: 1902–03; 124 years ago
- Athletic director: Rob Mullens
- Head coach: Tony Stubblefield (Interim); 1st season, 3–1 (.750)
- Location: Eugene, Oregon
- Arena: Matthew Knight Arena (capacity: 12,364)
- NCAA division: Division I
- Conference: Big Ten
- Nickname: Ducks
- Colors: Green and yellow
- Student section: Oregon Pit Crew
- All-time record: 1,814–1,450 (.556)
- NCAA tournament record: 28–18 (.609)

NCAA Division I tournament champions
- 1939
Other NCAA Division I tournament results
Final Four	1939, 2017
Elite Eight	1939, 1945, 1960, 2002, 2007, 2016, 2017
Sweet Sixteen	1960, 2002, 2007, 2013, 2016, 2017, 2019, 2021
Appearances	1939, 1945, 1960, 1961, 1995, 2000, 2002, 2003, 2007, 2008, 2013, 2014, 2015, 2016, 2017, 2019, 2021, 2024, 2025

Conference tournament champions
- Pac-12: 2003, 2007, 2013, 2016, 2019, 2024

Conference regular-season champions
- PCC: 1919, 1939, 1945 Pac-12: 2002, 2016, 2017, 2020, 2021

Conference division champions
- PCC North: 1925, 1926, 1927, 1938, 1939, 1945

CBI champion
- 2011

Uniforms
Home	Away	Alternate

The Oregon Ducks men's basketball team is an intercollegiate basketball program that competes in the NCAA Division I and is a member of the Big Ten Conference, representing the University of Oregon. The Ducks play their home games at Matthew Knight Arena, which has a capacity of 12,364. Then coached by Howard Hobson, Oregon won the first NCAA men's basketball national championship in 1939. They again reached the Final Four in 2017 under head coach Dana Altman, marking the longest span between appearances in NCAA history (79 years). The Ducks have made the NCAA tournament 19 times, and have won eight conference championships.

== History ==
=== Early years ===
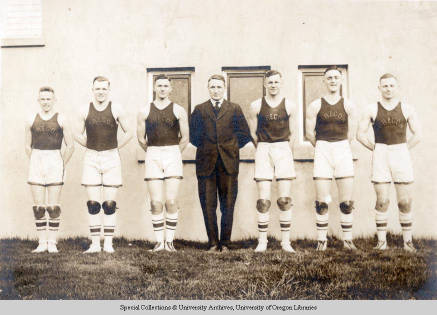
1919 Oregon Ducks men's basketball team

The University of Oregon men's basketball team played its first season in 1902–03 with Charles Burden as the head coach. Only two games were played that season, both against Corvallis State Agricultural College, now known as Oregon State. Oregon lost both games, losing the first one 32–2 on the road, and the second one 24–22 at home. Oregon did not record a win until its fourth season in 1907 against Roseburg. That season ended with a winning record of 4–3, under Hugo Bezdek, who also coached the football team. Bezdek left after that season to coach at Arkansas until 1913 when he went back to Oregon to coach until 1917.

During Bezdek's absence, the basketball team was coached largely by William Hayward, Oregon's track coach. In 1923, Bill Reinhart took over as the head coach and remained through the erection of McArthur Court until 1935. Coach Reinhart suffered only one losing season at Oregon.

=== The Tall Firs ===
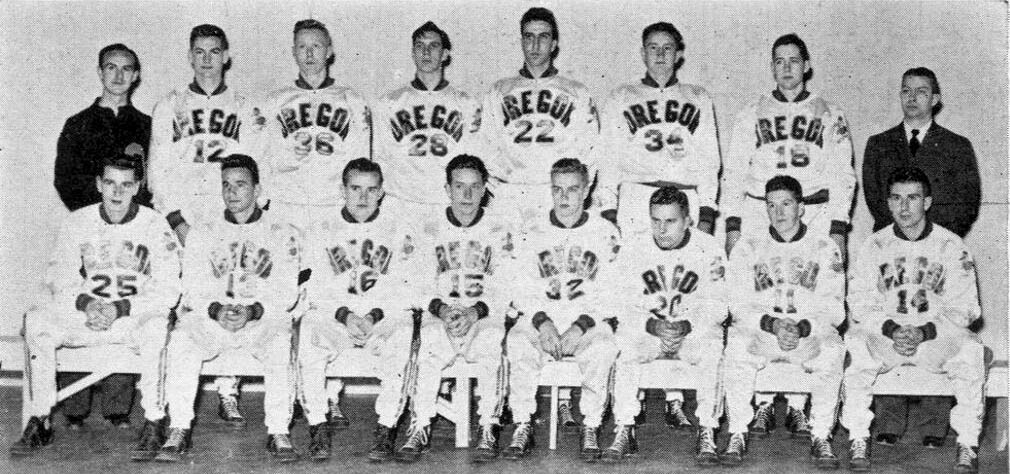
The 1939 Oregon team, first NCAA champions

Howard Hobson, an alumnus of the university, became the head coach in 1935, following Reinhart's departure. His ideas were considered cutting edge during his years at Oregon and he was well ahead of his time. He ran a fast break offense little used by anyone else in the country at the time and his defenses were an unorthodox hybrid defense. He lobbied for the installment of a shot clock and three-point field goal years before they were first introduced. In 1939, the Oregon Ducks became the first team to win the NCAA Basketball Championship. Sports editor L. H. Gregory coined the phrase "Tall Firs" to describe the Oregon players due to their taller stature compared to other teams in the country. The season started with a long trip to the east coast for a series of games, ending with a loss to Stanford back west in San Francisco. The Ducks went 6–3 during that trip but gained valuable experience for the remainder of the season. Oregon went 14–2 to claim the North Division title in the Pacific Coast Conference, which set off a best-of-three playoff against the California Golden Bears. The Ducks won two games straight to claim the conference title.

The Ducks returned to San Francisco for the NCAA regional series where they defeated the Texas Longhorns in the first game 56–41 then the Oklahoma Sooners 55–37. The Ohio State Buckeyes had defeated Wake Forest and Villanova in their regional series to earn their right in the championship game. On March 27, Oregon and Ohio State squared off to claim the national title. Oregon emerged victorious to claim the first NCAA national championship trophy, defeating Ohio State 46–33.

Howard Hobson remained as the head coach until 1947 except for a one-year hiatus during the 1944–45 season, coached by John Warren.

=== Kamikaze Kids ===
The six decades following the Tall Firs consisted of an eclectic mix of up and down years, with more down than up. From Hobson's departure in 1947 until 1970, Oregon made only two NCAA Tournament appearances, in 1960 and 1961 under head coach Steve Belko. Those were the days when only one team per conference (usually the conference champion) was guaranteed a bid to the NCAA Tournament. One of Belko's stars was Stan Love, a gifted shooter and rebounder, who led the Pac-8 in scoring for two straight seasons. He is the father of current NBA star Kevin Love. In 1971, head coach Dick Harter arrived at Oregon and achieved some consistency with the program. Harter's teams were dubbed the Kamikaze Kids and featured hard play, diving for loose balls, and swarming defense. They were also credited for inspiring the intimidating atmosphere at McArthur Court. While they never earned any conference titles due to UCLA's dominance of the Pac-8 (their best finish was second in 1976–77), they were not without accomplishments. They assembled two 20 win seasons, appeared in three straight NITs, and upset #1 ranked UCLA in 1974.

Harter's only losing season in Oregon was his first. He left in 1978 and the Ducks slid, suffering five consecutive losing seasons. Oregon made an appearance in the NCAA tournament in 1995 under head coach Jerry Green, but otherwise accrued largely mediocre records in the two decades after Harter's departure.

=== Ernie Kent era ===
In 1997, Ernie Kent was hired to fill the vacancy at head coach left by Jerry Green. Kent had been one of Harter's Kamikaze Kids, and his teams were known for a similarly up-tempo style of play. In his third season as head coach, he took the Ducks back to the NCAA tournament where they fell in the first round. In 2002, Kent led the Ducks to their first conference championship since 1945, going through the regular season undefeated at home. They earned a number 2 seed in the NCAA Tournament that year and advanced to the Elite Eight by defeating Montana, Wake Forest and Texas. They were eliminated by Kansas and finished the season with a number 11 ranking in the AP Poll. It was Oregon's deepest run in the tournament in 42 years.

Luke Ridnour was selected as the Pac-10 Player of the Year in 2003 as the Ducks won the Pac-10 tournament, defeating the USC Trojans in the conference championship game 74–66. The Ducks entered the NCAA Tournament as an 8 seed and lost to Utah in the first round 60–58.

Oregon made a Final Four appearance in the NIT in 2004 but otherwise made little impact until 2007. Oregon swept its 12 intersectional games to start 2007 and upset #1 ranked UCLA in the third Pac-10 game. The Ducks finished the regular season with a 23–7 record and defeated Arizona, California, and USC to win the 2007 Pac-10 Tournament. The Ducks earned a #3 seed in the NCAA tournament and advanced to the Elite Eight by defeating Miami (Ohio) 58–56, Winthrop 75–61 and University of Nevada, Las Vegas 76–72. On March 25, played and lost to the eventual NCAA National Champions, the Florida Gators, by a score of 85–77.

Oregon was considered the favorite to land Class of 2007 high school stars Kevin Love and Kyle Singler, widely considered to be the greatest high school players to ever come out of Oregon. Love eventually chose to attend UCLA and Singler chose Duke.

The Ducks were selected as a No. 9 seed in the 2008 NCAA tournament in the Southern Region. They lost to No. 8 seed Mississippi State Bulldogs in first-round play on March 21, 2008, in Little Rock, Arkansas.

On March 15, 2010, the university announced that the decision had been made to fire Ernie Kent as a result of poor performance in the previous two seasons, placing 9th and 10th in conference in the respective years. Kent departed as the longest tenured Pac-10 coach and winningest coach in school history with 235 wins.

=== Dana Altman era ===
In April 2010, Dana Altman from Creighton University was hired to replace Ernie Kent after a monthlong search. Altman led the Ducks to a CBI championship in his first year at Oregon and led the Ducks to the Sweet 16 during the 2012–13 season. Altman led the Ducks back to the NCAA Tournament in the 2013–14 season where they defeated BYU but fell to Wisconsin in the round of 32. It was their 12th NCAA tournament appearance and was the first time Oregon won tournament games in back to back seasons in program history. In 2014–15, Altman won his 2nd Pac-12 Coach of the Year in three seasons, as he had won the award in 2013. Altman also broke another school record as he became the first coach in Oregon history to go to three consecutive NCAA Tournaments (2013, 2014, 2015). Altman's success continued into the following season as Oregon won the 2015–16 regular season title, finishing 14–4 in league play. Altman also won the 2015–2016 Pac-12 Coach of the Year for the third time in four years. Lute Olson had been the only other coach in Pac-12 history to win the award three times in a four-year span.

The 2015–16 season was very noteworthy, with the Ducks emerging victorious in the 2015–16 Pac-12 Conference Tournament. This led to the Ducks being the top seed in the West Regional of the 2015–2016 NCAA tournament, its first ever top seeding in the NCAA tournament. The Ducks defeated Holy Cross and Saint Joseph's in the first two rounds of the NCAA tournament to advance to the Sweet 16 in Anaheim, where they defeated the number four seed and defending national champion Duke Blue Devils, 82–68, to advance to the Elite 8. The following year, the Ducks would go on to be Pac-12 conference co-champions with Arizona, whom they lost to in the championship game of the Pac-12 Tournament. In that year's NCAA Tournament the Ducks would advance all the way to the Final Four, losing to North Carolina by one point.

On October 7, 2026, Altman announced his retirement following 16 seasons as the Ducks' head coach.

== Venues and facilities ==
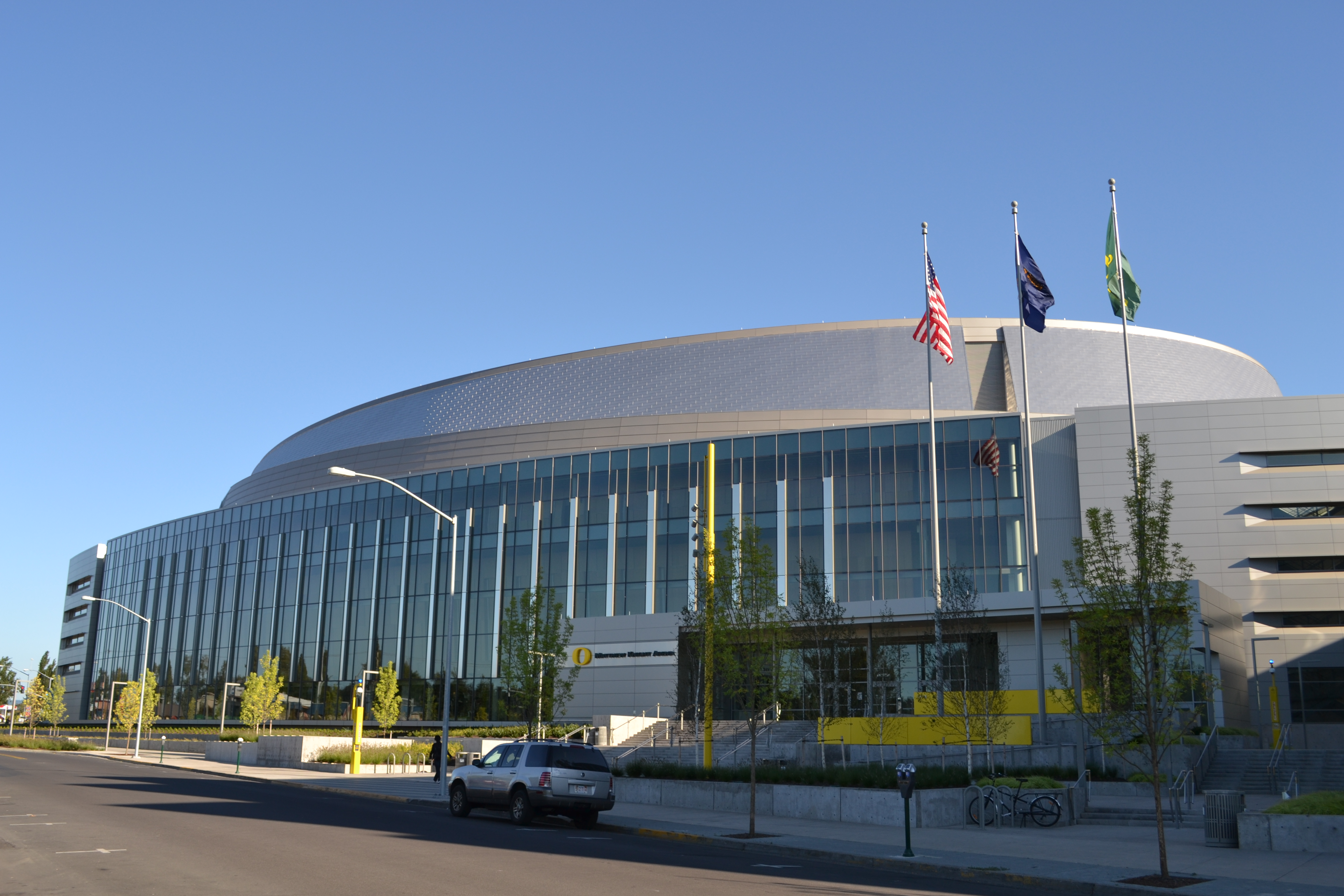
Matthew Knight Arena

McArthur Court was constructed in 1926 and the first Oregon basketball game was played in the arena on January 14, 1927, defeating Willamette University 38–10. The arena is located across from Pioneer Cemetery and is named after Clifton McArthur, the first student body president. Even during the Ducks' lean years, it was known as one of the most hostile arenas in the Pac-10. A group of students known as the "Pit Crew" has at times created environments so intimidating that the basket would shake as opponents attempted free throws.

In early 2009, the university broke ground on a new $227 million basketball arena designed by TVA Architects to replace McArthur Court. The new arena was named Matthew Knight Arena, after Phil Knight's son who drowned in a scuba diving accident in 2004. The arena is considered to be the front door to the university due to its high-profile location from where the majority of vehicular traffic into the university stems. A primary goal was to create the best collegiate basketball venue in the country though many criticisms arose due to the funding and price tag associated with the design. The hardwood court was named after Patrick Kilkenny, a booster for the university and the former interim athletic director. It had been the subject of much debate upon its opening, due to its unconventional and artistic design. Designer Tinker Hatfield's idea was to pay tribute to the 1939 national championship team, nicknamed "The Tall Firs", by creating silhouetted firs around the edges of the court. Matthew Knight Arena opened its doors for the first time on January 13, 2011, with the Ducks defeating the University of Southern California 68–62.

== Individual accomplishments ==
=== Individual National Award Winners ===
Players

- Lute Olson Award

Payton Pritchard (2020)

- Bob Cousy Award

Payton Pritchard (2020)

- Jerry West Award

Chris Duarte (2021)

Coaches

- Jim Phelan Award

Dana Altman (2013)

=== Individual Conference Award Winners ===
- Pac-12 Player of the Year

Ron Lee (1975-76)
Terrell Brandon (1990-91)
Luke Ridnour (2002-03)
Joe Young (2014-15)
Dillon Brooks (2016-17)
Payton Pritchard (2019-20)
Chris Duarte (2020-21) (AP)

- Pac-12 Defensive Player of the Year

Jordan Bell (2016-17)

- Pac-12 Freshman of the Year

Luke Ridnour (2000-01)

- Pac-12 Tournament Most Outstanding Player

Luke Ridnour (2003)
Tajuan Porter (2007)
Johnathan Loyd (2013)
Elgin Cook (2016)
Payton Pritchard (2019)
N'Faly Dante (2024)

- Pac-12 Coach of the Year

Dick Harter (1976-77)
Ernie Kent (2001-02)
Dana Altman (2012-13)
Dana Altman (2014-15)
Dana Altman (2015-16)

=== All-Americans ===
The following players were named first, second or third-team All-Americans by one of outlets used by the NCAA to determine consensus selections

Player	Year(s)	Team(s)
Edwin Durno	1921	Consensus First Team – Helms (1st)
Hugh Latham	1924	Consensus First Team – Helms (1st)
Algot Westergren	1926	Consensus First Team – Helms (1st)
Slim Wintermute	1938	Converse (3rd)
Slim Wintermute	1939	Consensus First Team – Helms (1st), Converse (1st)
Laddie Gale	1939	Helms (1st)
Bobby Anet	1939	Converse (1st)
John Dick	1940	Consensus First Team – Helms (1st), Converse (2nd), Madison Square Garden (1st)
Vic Townsend	1941	Converse (3rd)
Wally Borrevik	1944	Converse (3rd)
Ron Lee	1975	Consensus Second Team – AP (3rd), NABC (1st), UPI (2nd)
Ron Lee	1976	AP (2nd), NABC (3rd), UPI (3rd)
Greg Ballard	1977	Consensus Second Team – USBWA (2nd), NABC (3rd)
Luke Ridnour	2003	Sporting News (3rd)
Luke Jackson	2004	Consensus Second Team – AP (2nd), NABC (3rd), Sporting News (1st)
Aaron Brooks	2007	AP (3rd), Sporting News (2nd)
Joe Young	2015	Sporting News (3rd)
Dillon Brooks	2016	Sporting News (3rd)
Dillon Brooks	2017	Consensus Second Team – AP (2nd), USBWA (2nd), NABC (2nd), Sporting News (2nd)
Payton Pritchard	2020	Consensus First Team – AP (1st), USBWA (2nd), NABC (1st), Sporting News (1st)
Chris Duarte	2021	AP (3rd), USBWA (3rd)

== Postseason ==
=== NCAA tournament results ===
The Ducks have appeared in 19 NCAA tournaments. They won the inaugural NCAA tournament in 1939, winning the National Championship vs. Ohio State. Their combined record is 28–18, with one no–contest in 2021.

Year	Seed	Round	Opponent	Result
1939		Elite Eight; Final Four; Championship	Texas; Oklahoma; Ohio State	W 56–41; W 55–37; W 46–33
1945		Elite Eight; Regional 3rd Place	Arkansas; Utah	L 76–79; W 69–66
1960		Round of 25; Sweet Sixteen; Elite Eight	New Mexico State; Utah; California	W 68–60; W 65–54; L 49–70
1961		Round of 24	USC	L 79–81
1995	6 W	Round of 64	(11) Texas	L 73–90
2000	7 E	Round of 64	(10) Seton Hall	L 71–72 ^{OT}
2002	2 M	Round of 64; Round of 32; Sweet Sixteen; Elite Eight	(15) Montana (7) Wake Forest (6) Texas (1) #2 Kansas	W 81–62; W 92–87; W 72–70; L 86–104
2003	8 M	Round of 64	(9) Utah	L 58–60
2007	3 M	Round of 64; Round of 32; Sweet Sixteen; Elite Eight	(14) Miami (OH) (11) Winthrop (7) UNLV (1) #1 Florida	W 58–56; W 75–61; W 76–72; L 77–85
2008	9 S	Round of 64	(8) Mississippi State	L 69–76
2013	12 M	Round of 64; Round of 32; Sweet Sixteen	(5) #17 Oklahoma State (4) #13 Saint Louis (1) #2 Louisville	W 68–55; W 74–57; L 69–77
2014	7 W	Round of 64; Round of 32	(10) BYU (2) #12 Wisconsin	W 87–68; L 77–85
2015	8 W	Round of 64; Round of 32	(9) Oklahoma State (1) #3 Wisconsin	W 79–73; L 65–72
2016	1 W	Round of 64; Round of 32; Sweet Sixteen; Elite Eight	(16) Holy Cross (8) Saint Joseph's (4) #19 Duke (2) #7 Oklahoma	W 91–52; W 69–64; W 82–68; L 68–80
2017	3 M	Round of 64; Round of 32; Sweet Sixteen; Elite Eight; Final Four	(14) Iona (11) Rhode Island (7) #23 Michigan (1) #3 Kansas (1) #5 North Carolina	W 93–77; W 75–72; W 69–68; W 74–60; L 76–77
2019	12 S	Round of 64; Round of 32; Sweet Sixteen	(5) #21 Wisconsin (13) UC Irvine (1) #2 Virginia	W 72–54; W 73–54; L 49–53
2021	7 W	Round of 64; Round of 32; Sweet Sixteen	(10) VCU (2) #8 Iowa (6) #23 USC	No Contest (Note: Oregon advanced due to positive COVID-19 test in the VCU program.); W 95–80; L 68–82
2024	11 M	Round of 64; Round of 32	(6) #16 South Carolina (3) #11 Creighton	W 87–73; L 73–86 ^{2OT}
2025	5E	Round of 64; Round of 32	(12) Liberty (4) #21 Arizona	W 81–52; L 83–87

=== NCAA Tournament round history ===
Round	Record	Most Recent Appearance
National Championship	1–0	1939
Final Four	1–1	2017
Elite Eight	2–5	2017
Sweet Sixteen	5–3	2021
Round of 32	7–4	2025
Round of 64	11-4	2025
Regional third place	1–0	1945
Round of 24	1–1	1961

=== Historical NCAA Tournament Seeding ===
The NCAA began seeding the tournament with the 1979 edition.

Years →	'39	'45	'60	'61	'95	'00	'02	'03	'07	'08	'13	'14	'15	'16	'17	'19	'20	'21	'24	'25
Seeds →					6	7	2	8	3	9	12	7	8	1	3	12		7	11	5

- 1939 national champion
- The 2020 NCAA Division I men's basketball tournament was canceled March 12, 2020 due to the COVID-19 pandemic in the United States.

== Conference Tournament Championships ==
Season	Coach	Seed	Tournament Record	Opponent	Score
2003	Ernie Kent	5	3-0	USC	**W** 74-66
2007	Ernie Kent	4	3-0	USC	**W** 81-57
2013	Dana Altman	3	3-0	UCLA	**W** 78-69
2016	Dana Altman	1	3-0	Utah	**W** 88-57
2019	Dana Altman	6	4-0	Washington	**W** 68-48
2024	Dana Altman	4	3-0	Colorado	**W** 75-68

Pac-10/12 Tournament Seeding

Years →	'87	'88	'89	'90	'02	'03	'04	'05	'06	'07	'08	'09	'10	'11	'12	'13	'14	'15	'16	'17	'18	'19	'20	'21	'22	'23	'24
**Seeds→**	7	5	9	5	1	**5**	5	N/A	7	**4**	6	10	8	7	3	**3**	7	2	**1**	1	6	**6**	1	1	5	4	**4**

B1G Tournament Seeding

Years →	'25	'26
**Seeds→**	8	16

- **Bold** indicates tournament champion

=== NIT results ===
The Ducks have appeared in 13 National Invitation Tournaments. Their combined record is 17–13.

Year	Round	Opponent	Result
1975	First Round; Quarterfinals; Semifinals; Third Place Game	Saint Peter's; Oral Roberts; Princeton; St. John's	**W** 85–79; **W** 68–59; L 57–58; **W** 80–76
1976	Quarterfinals	Charlotte	L 72–79
1977	First Round; Quarterfinals	Oral Roberts; St. Bonaventure	**W** 90–89; L 73–76
1984	First Round	Santa Clara	L 53–66
1988	First Round; Second Round	Santa Clara; New Mexico	**W** 81–65; L 59–78
1990	First Round	New Mexico	L 78–89
1997	First Round	Hawai'i	L 61–71
1999	First Round; Second Round; Quarterfinals; Semifinals; Third Place Game	Georgia Tech; Wyoming; TCU; California; Xavier	**W** 67–64; **W** 93–72; **W** 77–68; L 69–85; L 75–106
2004	First Round; Second Round; Quarterfinals; Semifinals	Colorado; George Mason; Notre Dame; Michigan	**W** 77–72; **W** 68–54; **W** 65–61; L 53–78
2012	First Round; Second Round; Quarterfinals	LSU; Iowa; Washington	**W** 96–74; **W** 108–97; L 86–90
2018	First Round; Second Round	Rider; Marquette	**W** 99–86; L 92–101
2022	First Round; Second Round	Utah State; Texas A&M	**W** 83–72; L 60–75
2023	First Round; Second Round; Quarterfinals	UC Irvine; UCF; Wisconsin	**W** 84–58; **W** 68–54; L 58–61

=== CBI results ===
The Ducks have appeared in one College Basketball Invitational. Their record is 5–1 and were the 2011 champions.

Year	Round	Opponent	Result
2011	First Round; Quarterfinals; Semifinals; Finals Game 1 Finals Game 2 Finals Game 3	Weber State; Duquesne; Boise State; Creighton; Creighton; Creighton	**W** 68–59; **W** 77–75; **W** 79–71; L 76–84; **W** 71–58; **W** 71–69

=== Record vs. former Pac-12 opponents ===
All-time series includes non-conference matchups and Pac-12 Tournament results.

Opponent	Wins	Losses	Pct.	Streak
Arizona	38	55	(.409)	Arizona 1
Arizona St.	49	47	(.510)	Oregon 2
Cal	69	86	(.445)	Cal 1
Colorado	13	17	(.433)	Oregon 1
Oregon St.	174	192	(.475)	Oregon 9
Stanford	60	96	(.385)	Oregon 3
Utah	31	11	(.738)	Oregon 1
Washington State	176	126	(.583)	Wash St 1

=== Record vs. Big Ten Opponents ===
All-time series includes non-conference matchups.

Opponent	Wins	Losses	Pct.	Streak
Illinois	2	6	(.250)	Illinois 2
Indiana	2	4	(.333)	Indiana 1
Iowa	3	7	(.300)	Iowa 1
Maryland	2	0	(1.000)	Oregon 2
Michigan	3	6	(.333)	Michigan 2
Michigan State	2	4	(.333)	Michigan State 4
Minnesota	3	8	(.273)	Minnesota 2
Nebraska	6	9	(.400)	Nebraska 2
Northwestern	3	1	(.750)	NW 1
Ohio State	2	3	(.400)	Ohio St 1
Penn State	3	0	(1.000)	Oregon 3
Purdue	2	4	(.333)	Purdue 2
Rutgers	2	2	(.500)	Rutgers 1
UCLA	42	98	(.300)	UCLA 4
USC	67	70	(.489)	Oregon 1
Washington	126	192	(.396)	Oregon 1
Wisconsin	5	6	(.455)	Oregon 2

Updated March 8, 2026

== Oregon men's basketball players in professional teams ==
Player	Year	Drafted team	Current team	Drafted
Eugene Omoruyi	2021	Undrafted	Raptors 905	-
Chris Duarte	2021	Indiana Pacers	Vaqueros de Bayamón	RD 1, 13th overall
Payton Pritchard	2020	Boston Celtics	Boston Celtics	RD 1, 26th overall
Ehab Amin	2019	Undrafted	Al Ahly (Egypt)	-
Louis King	2019	Undrafted	Fujian Sturgeons	-
Kenny Wooten	2019	Undrafted	Free Agent	-
Bol Bol	2019	Miami Heat	Phoenix Suns	RD 2, 44th overall
Jamil Wilson	2018	Undrafted	Plateros de Fresnillo (Mexico)	-
Troy Brown Jr.	2018	Washington Wizards	Cangrejeros de Santurce	RD 1, 15th overall
Chris Boucher	2017	Undrafted	Boston Celtics	-
Dillon Brooks	2017	Houston Rockets	Houston Rockets	RD 2, 45th overall
Tyler Dorsey	2017	Atlanta Hawks	Fenerbahçe (Turkey)	RD 2, 41st overall
Jordan Bell	2017	Chicago Bulls	Indiana Mad Ants	RD 2, 38th overall
Elgin Cook	2016	Undrafted	CB Canarias (Spain)	-
Joe Young	2015	Indiana Pacers	Fujian Sturgeons (China)	RD 2, 43rd overall
Roman Sorkin	2014	Undrafted	Maccabi Tel Aviv	-
E.J. Singler	2013	Undrafted	Free Agent	-
Arsalan Kazemi	2013	Washington Wizards	Zob Ahan Isfahan (Iran)	RD 2, 54th overall
Tajuan Porter	2011	Undrafted	Free Agent	-
Malik Hairston	2008	Phoenix Suns	Retired	RD 2, 48th overall
Maarty Leunen	2008	Houston Rockets	Retired	RD 2, 54th overall
Bryce Taylor	2008	Undrafted	Retired	-
Aaron Brooks	2007	Houston Rockets	Retired	RD 1, 26th overall
Luke Jackson	2004	Cleveland Cavaliers	Retired	RD 1, 10th overall
Luke Ridnour	2003	Seattle SuperSonics	Retired	RD 1, 14th overall
Fred Jones	2002	Indiana Pacers	Retired	RD 1, 14th overall
Chris Christoffersen	2002	Undrafted	Retired	-
Bryan Bracey	2001	San Antonio Spurs	Retired	RD 2, 58th overall
Terrell Brandon	1991	Cleveland Cavaliers	Retired	RD 1, 11th overall
Blair Rasmussen	1985	Denver Nuggets	Retired	RD 1, 15th overall
Greg Ballard	1977	Washington Bullets	Retired	RD 1, 4th overall
