= Wally Johansen =

American basketball player

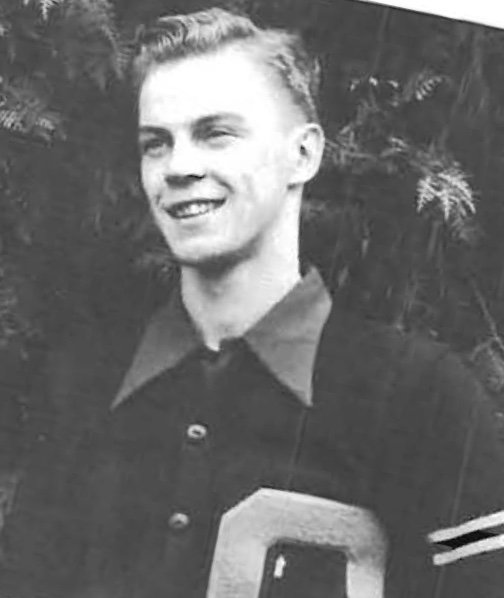
- Johansen from the 1939 Oregana

Personal information
- Born: August 26, 1917 Astoria, Oregon, U.S.
- Died: September 8, 1971 (aged 54) Coos Bay, Oregon, U.S.
- Listed height: 5 ft 11 in (1.80 m)

Career information
- High school: Astoria (Astoria, Oregon)
- College: Oregon (1936–1939)
- Position: Guard
- Number: 32

Career highlights
- NCAA champion (1939); First-team All-PCC (1938); No. 32 retired by Oregon Ducks

Wallace A. Johansen (August 26, 1917 – September 8, 1971) was a college basketball guard who played for the University of Oregon when it won the inaugural NCAA Men's Division I Basketball Tournament championship in 1938–39.

== Early life ==
Born in Astoria, Oregon, Johansen played basketball at Astoria High School, graduating in 1935 and helping the Fishermen win two consecutive state championships. That same year, his high school coach, John Warren, was hired as the freshman basketball coach at the University of Oregon, and he recruited Johansen and teammate Bobby Anet to enroll at Oregon.

== College ==
At Oregon, Johansen played three seasons for the Ducks varsity, forming a reliable backcourt with Anet, his teammate since junior high school. In his senior season of 1939, the Ducks won the Northern Division of the Pacific Coast Conference, and then defeated Southern Division champion California to win the conference championship and advance to the inaugural 1939 NCAA basketball championship, where they faced Ohio State in the final game. As Ohio State focused on stopping Oregon's frontcourt players, known as the "Tall Firs," Johansen and Anet ran the fast break and took control of the game. Johansen scored 9 points to help lead Oregon to a convincing 46–33 victory. Johansen had his jersey (#32) retired, and was later inducted into the Oregon Sports Hall of Fame as well as the University of Oregon Sports Hall of Fame.

== After basketball ==
After he graduated from Oregon, Johansen enrolled at the University of Oregon School of Law. His law school studies were interrupted by his service in World War II, but following the war, he earned his law degree from Oregon in 1948. He became an associate in the Coos Bay, Oregon law firm McKeown & Newhouse, eventually becoming a partner in the firm. From 1967 to 1968, Johansen served as President of the Oregon State Bar. He died of a heart attack in 1971.

== See also ==
- 1938–39 Oregon Ducks men's basketball team
