= Lauren Gale =

Lauren Gale may refer to:

- Lauren Gale (sprinter) (born 2000) Canadian track and field athlete
- Lauren "Laddie" Gale (1917–1996), American basketball player
