= 1938–39 Oregon Webfoots men's basketball team =

American college basketball season

1938–39 Oregon Webfoots men's basketball
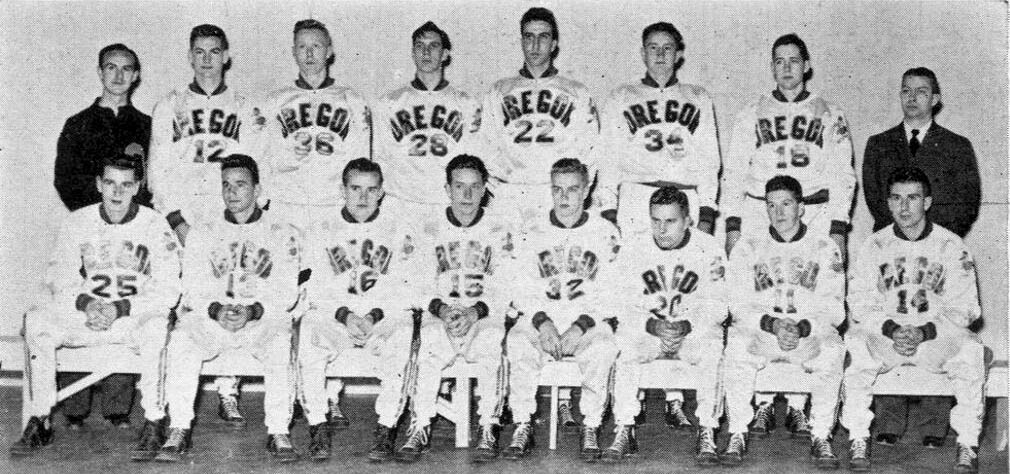

NCAA tournament National champions PCC champions

National Championship Game, W 46–33 vs. Ohio State
- Conference: Pacific Coast Conference
- North
- Record: 29–5 (14–2 PCC)
- Head coach: Howard Hobson (4th season)
- Home arena: McArthur Court

1938–39 Pacific Coast Conference men's basketball standings
	Conf.				Overall
Team	W		L	PCT	W		L	PCT
North
Oregon †	14	–	2	.875	29	–	5	.853
Washington	11	–	5	.688	20	–	5	.800
Washington State	8	–	8	.500	23	–	10	.697
Oregon State	6	–	10	.375	13	–	11	.542
Idaho	1	–	15	.063	12	–	19	.387
South
California	9	–	3	.750	24	–	8	.750
USC	9	–	3	.750	20	–	5	.800
Stanford	6	–	6	.500	16	–	9	.640
UCLA	0	–	12	.000	7	–	20	.259
† Conference playoff series winner

The 1938–39 Oregon Webfoots men's basketball team was a college basketball team that represented the University of Oregon. The Webfoots, (Note: The team had been nicknamed the Ducks, the University of Oregon's modern name for its athletic programs, by members of the press. That nickname was unofficial, however, and the team was officially called the Webfoots.) coached by Howard Hobson, played in the Pacific Coast Conference (PCC) and compiled a 29–5 win–loss record in regular and postseason competition. After winning the PCC title, they became the champions of the inaugural NCAA basketball tournament.

Coming off a season in which the Webfoots were defeated in the PCC championship series by Stanford, the team returned all five of their starters. Known for their fast break offense, Oregon's players were nicknamed the "Tall Firs" and held a height advantage over most teams. After several early-season wins, the Webfoots went on an extended road trip to the East Coast, becoming the first West Coast team to do so. The team suffered two losses on the trip, to City College of New York (CCNY) and Bradley, but posted seven victories as well. Oregon won 10 consecutive games at one point in PCC competition, and clinched a Northern Division championship with a win in the next-to-last contest of the regular season. In the best-of-three PCC championship series, against California, the Webfoots won in two games to earn the team's first conference championship since 1919.

Oregon was invited to compete in the West Regional of the NCAA tournament, and beat Texas in their first game to reach the regional final, where the team won against Oklahoma. At the first NCAA tournament final, versus Ohio State, the Webfoots claimed a 46–33 victory behind a game-high 15 points by John H. Dick. Three players from the 1938–39 Oregon men's basketball team were selected as All-Americans, and Hobson and Lauren Gale have been honored by the Basketball Hall of Fame.

== Background ==
The 1937–38 Webfoots posted a win–loss record of 14–6 in Pacific Coast Conference play. In the conference's North division, the Webfoots won the title by a one-game margin over Washington. The Webfoots were led by Lauren Gale, who was the PCC North division's leader in scoring with 12.5 points per game in conference play; his overall average was 12.4. Oregon advanced to the best-of-three PCC championship series, but lost two consecutive games to Stanford by margins of 52–39 and 59–51. That ended the team's hopes of being crowned PCC champions. Following the decisive game of the series, player Bobby Anet said at a team meeting, "Next year, we're going to win everything."

== Roster and schedule ==
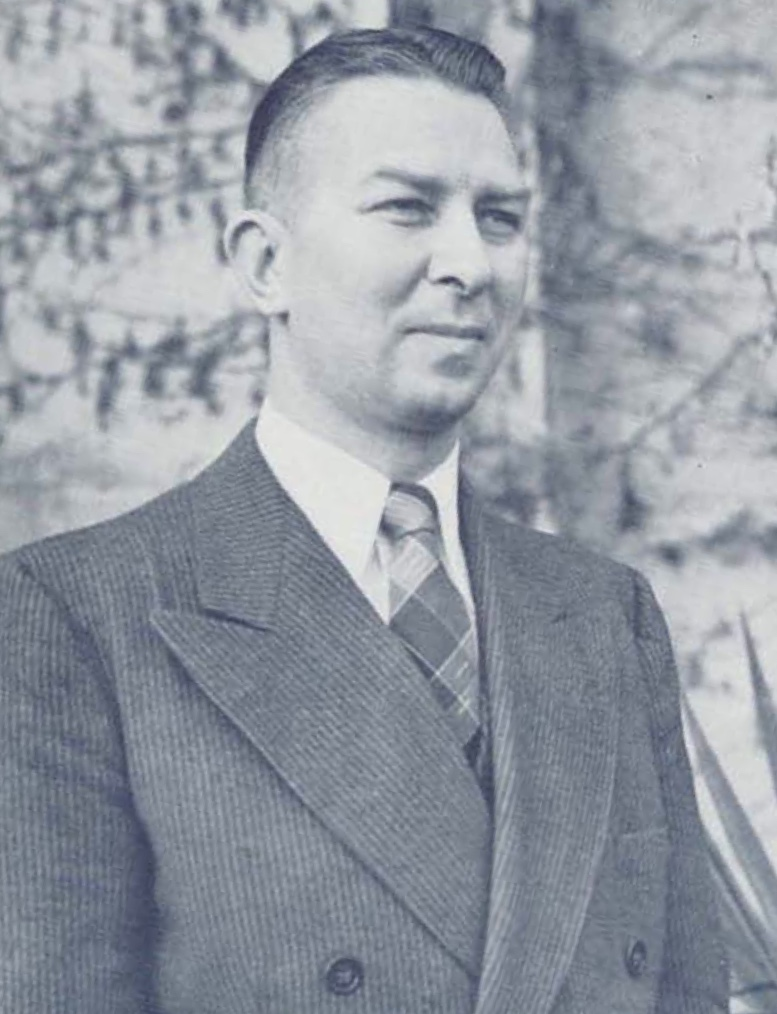
Howard Hobson was the Webfoots' head coach in 1938–39

Oregon's entire starting lineup returned from the 1937–38 team that had lost in the conference championship playoff; it included 6'8" center Slim Wintermute, who was known for his shot-blocking ability. Forward Gale, who was 6'4", had what sportswriter Michael Russell called "enormous hands (that) allowed him to fake opponents while palming the ball with one hand"; he was the PCC points-scoring leader in 1938–39. Anet, a 5'8" guard, was "the heart of the team", according to Russell, due to his ability to dribble and run the floor quickly. He was the Webfoots' captain, and was responsible for calling timeouts and engaging in conversations with referees. Other players on the team included 6'4" forward John H. Dick and 5'11" guard Wally Johansen. Newspaper editor L. H. Gregory called the Oregon team the "Tall Firs" due to the height of the team's players, since Oregon was taller than most other teams of the era. Eight of the eleven men on the roster came from Oregon, and the other three from neighboring Washington. Anet and Johansen, along with forwards Earl Sandness and Ted Sarpola, had played for Astoria High School; Anet and Johansen had won multiple state championships before joining Oregon. Ford Mullen, a future Major League Baseball player, was a backup guard on the team. Along with Mullen, the Webfoots' reserves included guard Matt Pavalunas and forwards Bob Hardy and Ted Sarpola. The team normally played up to nine players in a game, foregoing a regular substitute for Wintermute; when he needed a rest, Dick or Gale often changed positions to play center, allowing for a third forward to be inserted into the lineup. The Webfoots' head coach was Howard Hobson, who was in his fourth season on the job. In his previous three seasons, he had led the Webfoots to a total win–loss record of 63–28.

Oregon's preferred offensive game plan was to play an attacking fast break style of basketball. In response, opposing teams with shorter players often played a slower-paced offense. Oregon's fast break was unique among West Coast basketball teams, who were not accustomed to facing such an offensive style. Dick said of the team's attack that "We wanted to keep the pressure on (the opponent) mentally – more so than physically. Never give them a moment's rest." When inbounding the ball, the Webfoots often restarted play quickly to maintain their fast pace. Hobson frequently tracked Oregon's attempted shots in both competition and practice sessions, and built the offense around his players' strengths. On defense, the team switched between zone and man-to-man styles depending on how its opponent played.

1938–39 Oregon Webfoots roster
Name	#	Position	Height	Year	Home town
Bobby Anet	20	Guard	5–8	Senior	Astoria, Oregon
John Dick	18	Forward	6–4	Junior	The Dalles, Oregon
Lauren Gale	28	Forward	6–4	Senior	Oakridge, Oregon
Bob Hardy	40	Forward	6–3	Senior	Ashland, Oregon
Wally Johansen	32	Guard	5–11	Senior	Astoria, Oregon
Red McNeely	15	Guard	6–2	Sophomore	Portland, Oregon
Ford Mullen	13	Guard	5–8	Junior	Olympia, Washington
Matt Pavalunas	11	Guard	6–0	Junior	Raymond, Washington
Earl Sandness	36	Center	6–4	Sophomore	Astoria, Oregon
Ted Sarpola	25	Forward	6–2	Junior	Astoria, Oregon
Slim Wintermute	22	Center	6–8	Senior	Longview, Washington

Date time, TV	Opponent	Result	Record	Site city, state
Regular season
11/29/1938*	Portland	W 51–24	1–0	McArthur Court; Eugene, Oregon
12/02/1938*	Multnomah AC	W 83–25	2–0	McArthur Court; Eugene, Oregon
12/03/1938*	Signal Oil	W 46–34	3–0	McArthur Court; Eugene, Oregon
12/12/1938*	at Pacific Packards	W 54–39	4–0	Benson Polytechnic High School; Portland, Oregon
12/17/1938*	at CCNY	L 36–38	4–1	Madison Square Garden; New York City, New York
12/19/1938*	at Saint Joseph's	W 54–44	5–1	Philadelphia Convention Hall; Philadelphia, Pennsylvania
12/20/1938*	vs. Miami (OH)	W 74–38	6–1	Public Auditorium; Cleveland, Ohio
12/22/1938*	at Canisius	W 53–41	7–1	Broadway Auditorium; Buffalo, New York
12/23/1938*	at Wayne State	W 52–41	8–1	Detroit Naval Armory; Detroit, Michigan
12/26/1938*	at Bradley	L 39–52	8–2	City Armory; Peoria, Illinois
12/27/1938*	vs. Western Illinois	W 60–45	9–2	Chicago Coliseum; Chicago, Illinois
12/29/1938*	at Drake	W 42–31	10–2	Drake Fieldhouse; Des Moines, Iowa
12/31/1939*	vs. Stanford	L 46–50	10–3	San Francisco Civic Auditorium; San Francisco, California
01/06/1939	Washington State	W 46–35	11–3 (1–0)	McArthur Court; Eugene, Oregon
01/07/1939	Washington State	L 34–39	11–4 (1–1)	McArthur Court; Eugene, Oregon
01/13/1939	at Oregon State	W 31–26	12–4 (2–1)	— Corvallis, Oregon
01/17/1939	at Washington State	W 56–44	13–4 (3–1)	— Pullman, Washington
01/18/1939	at Washington State	W 57–31	14–4 (4–1)	— Pullman, Washington
01/20/1939	at Idaho	W 38–30	15–4 (5–1)	Memorial Gymnasium; Moscow, Idaho
01/21/1939	at Idaho	W 35–31	16–4 (6–1)	Memorial Gymnasium; Moscow, Idaho
01/27/1939	Oregon State	W 46–39	17–4 (7–1)	McArthur Court; Eugene, Oregon
01/31/1939	Washington	W 57–49	18–4 (8–1)	McArthur Court; Eugene, Oregon
02/01/1939	Washington	W 58–42	19–4 (9–1)	McArthur Court; Eugene, Oregon
02/10/1939	Idaho	W 45–28	20–4 (10–1)	McArthur Court; Eugene, Oregon
02/11/1939	Idaho	W 53–36	21–4 (11–1)	McArthur Court; Eugene, Oregon
02/18/1939	at Oregon State	L 31–50	21–5 (11–2)	— Corvallis, Oregon
02/24/1939	Oregon State	W 48–37	22–5 (12–2)	McArthur Court; Eugene, Oregon
03/03/1939	at Washington	W 39–26	23–5 (13–2)	UW Pavilion; Seattle, Washington
03/04/1939	at Washington	W 54–52	24–5 (14–2)	UW Pavilion; Seattle, Washington
PCC championship
03/16/1939	California	W 54–49	25–5	McArthur Court; Eugene, Oregon
03/17/1939	California	W 53–47	26–5	McArthur Court; Eugene, Oregon
NCAA tournament
03/20/1939*	vs. Texas	W 56–41	27–5	Golden Gate International Exposition Coliseum; San Francisco, California
03/21/1939*	vs. Oklahoma	W 55–37	28–5	Golden Gate International Exposition Coliseum; San Francisco, California
03/27/1939*	vs. Ohio State	W 46–33	29–5	Patten Gymnasium; Evanston, Illinois
*Non-conference game. (#) Tournament seedings in parentheses.

== Regular season ==
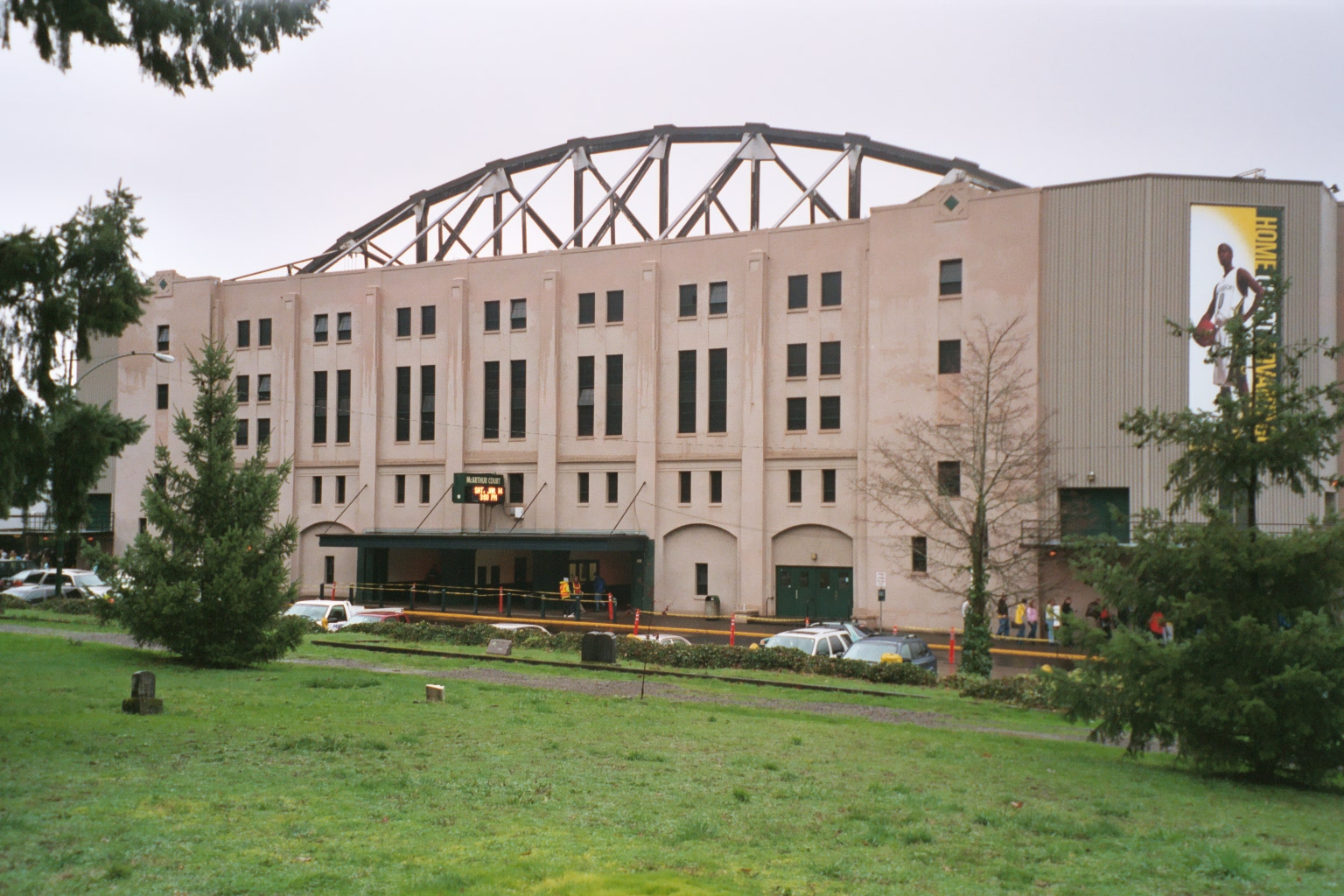
McArthur Court, Oregon's home arena during the 1938–39 season, in 2006

The Webfoots began the 1938–39 season by defeating Portland 51–24 on November 29, 1938. Oregon's second game was also against a team based in Portland, which represented the Multnomah Athletic Club. The Webfoots won by an 83–25 final score. In a closer game with a team representing Signal Oil, Oregon stretched its winning streak to three games with a 46–34 triumph. The team then recorded a victory over Pacific Packards, by a 54–39 final score.

Following those games, the Webfoots embarked on a long trip through the Eastern United States; they were the first college basketball team from the West Coast to do so. Nine games were set up in as many cities, with eight held on the East Coast and one in San Francisco before the team returned home. In scheduling the extended trip away from Oregon, Hobson sought to show the team "different styles of play and officiating" and help them prepare for games later in the season. As a result of the extended travel, a University of Oregon student newspaper nickname the club the "Wandering Webfoots". The first game of the trip came in December at New York City's Madison Square Garden against City College of New York (CCNY). Oregon had a poor start to the game; according to the Sporting News, the team was "confused by officials' interpretation of legal and illegal screens to the moving picks set by City College of New York." CCNY took an early 10-point lead, but Oregon cut its deficit in half by the end of the first half, and tied the game at 30–30. Despite Oregon's comeback attempt, CCNY won 38–36 to hand the Webfoots their first loss of the season. The trip continued on December 19 with a game at Convention Hall in Philadelphia, against local team Saint Joseph's. Oregon won easily by a 54–44 margin, as Gale and Wintermute led the Webfoots with 13 points each.

Future stops included Chicago, Cleveland, and Detroit, among other locations. Starting with the St. Joseph's game, the Webfoots had a streak in which they played four games in five days before Christmas Eve. On December 20, Oregon routed Miami (Ohio) 74–38, as Sarpola led the team with 20 points. Wintermute suffered an ankle injury during the game. The Webfoots then defeated Canisius by a 12-point margin. In the next game, against an undefeated Wayne State team, the Webfoots entered halftime tied at 22–22 and needed a late burst of scoring, led by Gale and Johansen, to clinch an 11-point victory. After the Miami (Ohio) game, Wintermute missed three of the team's following four games. The Webfoots won without him in their next two games, but not in the game in which he returned to action against Bradley. In Peoria, Illinois, Oregon fell behind by 17 points at halftime and lost 52–39, as Bradley center Dar Hutchins tallied 17 points while defended by Wintermute, who was playing through his ankle injury. Following their loss to Bradley, Oregon traveled to the Chicago Coliseum for a game against Western Illinois State Teachers College. Despite being without the services of Wintermute again, the Webfoots posted a 60–45 victory. Drake, the Webfoots' opponent on December 29 in Chicago, was defeated by 11 points. The final game of the road trip, held in San Francisco on New Year's Eve, saw the Webfoots lose to Stanford. The stretch proved profitable for the school, which made $4,400 off of the East Coast games, and Dick credited the trip for giving the Webfoots exposure to different styles of play than they had been accustomed to.

=== Conference play ===
The Webfoots then entered play in the PCC, with four games scheduled against each of the four other teams in the conference's Northern Division; Oregon hosted each club twice and played two games at all opposing teams' arenas. At the beginning of 1939, the Webfoots began its PCC schedule with consecutive home games against Washington State on January 6 and 7. In the first, Oregon entered halftime with a nine-point advantage and prevailed by a 46–35 margin. They lost the second, 39–34, for their only home defeat of the season; the loss broke a 23-game winning streak at McArthur Court, the Webfoots' arena.

Oregon then began a 10-game winning streak, their longest since the start of the 1937–38 season. Oregon State was the Webfoots' first opponent during the streak, on January 13; Oregon prevailed 31–26. In two higher-scoring contests at Washington State on January 17 and 18, the Webfoots claimed 56–44 and 57–31 victories, respectively. A five-game road trip concluded with games in Idaho on January 20 and 21. The contests were closer than those against Washington State, but the Webfoots won 38–30 in the first game and 35–31 in the second to improve to 6–1 in conference play. Oregon's next five games were at home, beginning with a second encounter against Oregon State, on January 27 that they won by a seven-point margin. Washington traveled to Oregon for games on January 31 and February 1, and 57–49 and 58–42 victories moved the Webfoots' winning streak to eight. They then concluded their four-game season series with Idaho, winning by 17 points in each game. On February 18, the Webfoots' streak ended with a 50–31 upset loss to Oregon State, which would be their last of the season. Six days later, Oregon posted a 48–37 win over the Beavers at home. That game was the Webfoots' last appearance for the 1938–39 regular season at McArthur Court; it was the school's 100th win at the arena since it was opened in 1927.

With two games left in the regular season, the Webfoots held a one-game lead over Washington, with a pair of contests scheduled in Seattle against the Huskies. Oregon required one victory to clinch the Northern Division championship. On March 3, the Webfoots defeated Washington in the first game of the series 39–26; Gale led the team in scoring with 11 points, as the team won despite missing 53 of their 67 field goal attempts. Anet suffered a dislocated finger and was held out of the second game against Washington, which took place the following day. The Webfoots claimed a two-point win, their fourth of the season over Washington. Of the Huskies' five losses in 1938–39, all but one was against the Webfoots. By the end of the regular season, Oregon had won the PCC North Division with a 14–2 conference record, and had a 24–5 record overall.

== Postseason ==
=== PCC championship series ===
By winning the PCC Northern Division, Oregon earned the right to play the winner of the Southern Division in a best-of-three playoff series, with the games held at McArthur Court. In addition to the PCC championship, the winner would gain a berth in the first NCAA Division I men's basketball tournament, which the National Association of Basketball Coaches would run. The series was slated to be held between March 10–13, but a tie between California and Southern California for first place in the Southern Division necessitated a one-game playoff. Rumors began that the PCC championship series would be postponed by one week, which would have prevented the winner from competing in the NCAA tournament; the event was scheduled to begin on March 20. In response, Oregon declared that they would not play if the series was scheduled to end after March 14. Despite the school's claim, it agreed to a rescheduling approved by PCC member schools, in which the series was set for March 16–18. Hobson declared that Oregon would accept an invitation to the NCAA tournament, following hints that the PCC champion might be passed over for a bid in favor of a PCC team that did not receive a shortened rest between games. California won the Southern Division playoff 42–36 over Southern California to become the Webfoots' opponent in the PCC championship series. Dick later noted that he considered it vital for Oregon to sweep the Golden Bears in two games, to avoid an overnight trip to San Francisco for the NCAA tournament and secure an off day in the Webfoots' schedule.

In front of a crowd that included members of the Webfoots' 1919 conference championship team, which had won the title over California, Oregon took a one-point halftime lead on a late 30-foot shot by Johansen. The team switched its defense from zone to man-to-man for the second half and went on an early second half run to open up a 14-point lead with 12 minutes left. The Golden Bears made multiple comeback bids as the half progressed, but the Webfoots held on to win 54–49 and move ahead in the series. More than half of Oregon's points were scored by Gale and Wintermute, who had 18 and 11 respectively. The second game of the series was closely contested in the first half, but Oregon opened a 25–23 lead at halftime and extended their advantage to eight points before a run of three baskets by California. A stretch featuring three scores by Dick helped the Webfoots rebuild their lead later in the second half, and they clinched a two-game sweep with a 53–47 victory. Dick and Wintermute contributed 16 points apiece. It was Oregon's first PCC championship in 20 seasons.

=== NCAA tournament ===
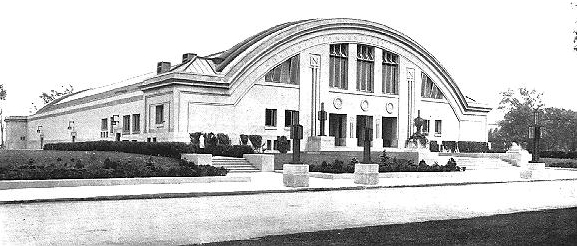
Patten Gymnasium, site of the 1939 NCAA national championship game

Oregon received an invitation to the NCAA tournament's West Regional, which was held on March 20 and 21 in San Francisco. First, Oregon faced Texas in the first round, in a matchup of teams considered superior to either of their potential opponents in the regional final, according to analysts. The Webfoots scored 10 of the game's first 12 points, led by Dick and Wintermute, and held a three-point halftime advantage. After Texas had closed their deficit to one point multiple times in the second half, Oregon went on a scoring run and eventually opened a 19-point lead. The Webfoots defeated Texas by a final score of 56–41. Wintermute had 14 points in the game, and Dick added 13. In the regional final against Oklahoma, a 10–0 run to close the first half put the Webfoots in front, 21–14. Oregon took advantage of Oklahoma's strategy of attempting to play a fast-paced game and extended their lead in the second half. Dick had 14 points and Gale and Wintermute scored 11 and 10, respectively, as Oregon advanced to the national championship game with a 55–37 victory. All three of the Webfoots' leading scorers in the regional final were selected to the all-Western regional squad, as determined by Kansas head coach Phog Allen. Hobson commented on his team's NCAA tournament opponents that "We were head and shoulders above [both], but not so with Washington and California."

The title game was held on March 27 in Northwestern University's Patten Gymnasium. Oregon's opponent was Ohio State, who had won the East Regional by winning against Wake Forest and Villanova. Oregon took advantage of the Buckeyes' defense, which was designed to stop Gale and Wintermute, by using Gale as "a decoy", in his words. This created an opportunity for contributions from the Webfoots' other players, including Dick, who led both teams by scoring 15 points. On Ohio State's offensive possessions, the Webfoots used a match-up zone defense, as Hobson sought to force the Buckeyes into attempting long-distance shots. The defense held the Buckeyes' field goal percentage to 17 percent for the game; in addition, Oregon gained a rebounding advantage. The Webfoots held a five-point lead at halftime, having led by as much as seven. After Ohio State closed to within one point, Oregon pulled away in the second half to win the national championship, 46–33. Afterward came what Dick termed "a two-handed trophy presentation"; during the game, Anet had broken a figure off the top of the championship trophy while attempting to gain possession of the ball by the sideline. On the team's way back to the University of Oregon, a crowd of 2,000–3,000 people greeted the Webfoots in The Dalles, Dick's birthplace, and presented him with what Sporting News writer Joe Gergen called "the first championship watch in NCAA Tournament history." The train stopped in several other cities on the way to Eugene, where a parade was held for the Webfoots.

== Aftermath and legacy ==
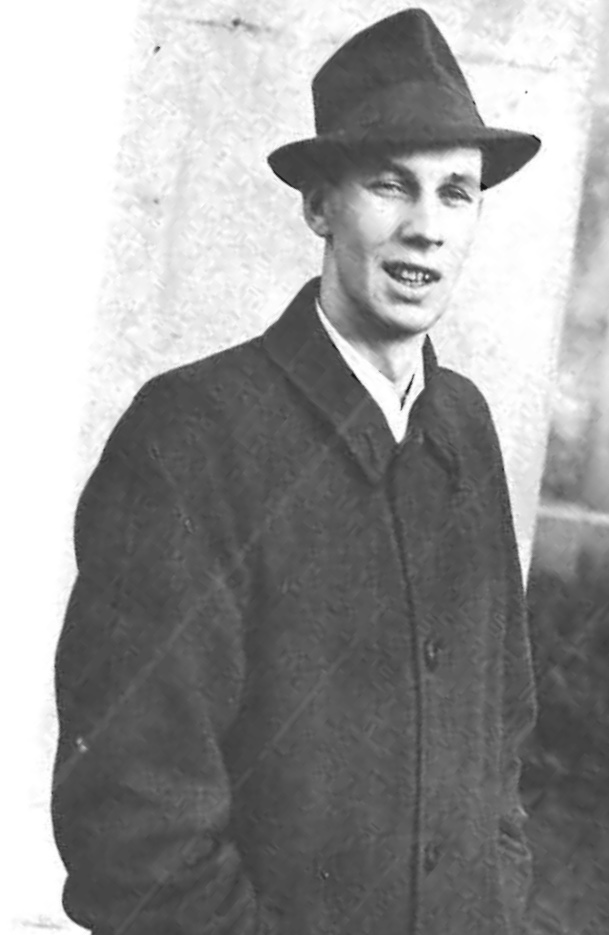
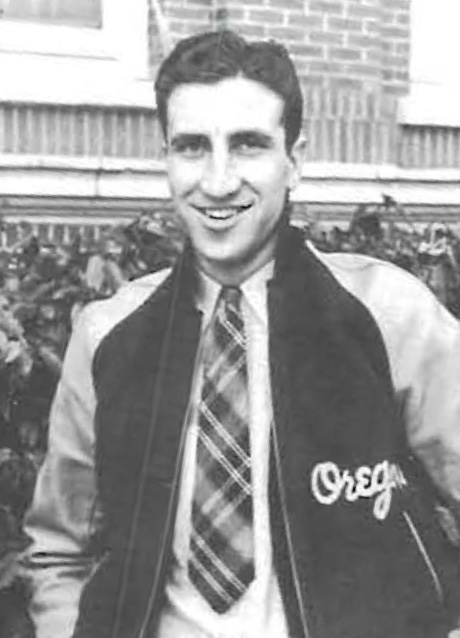
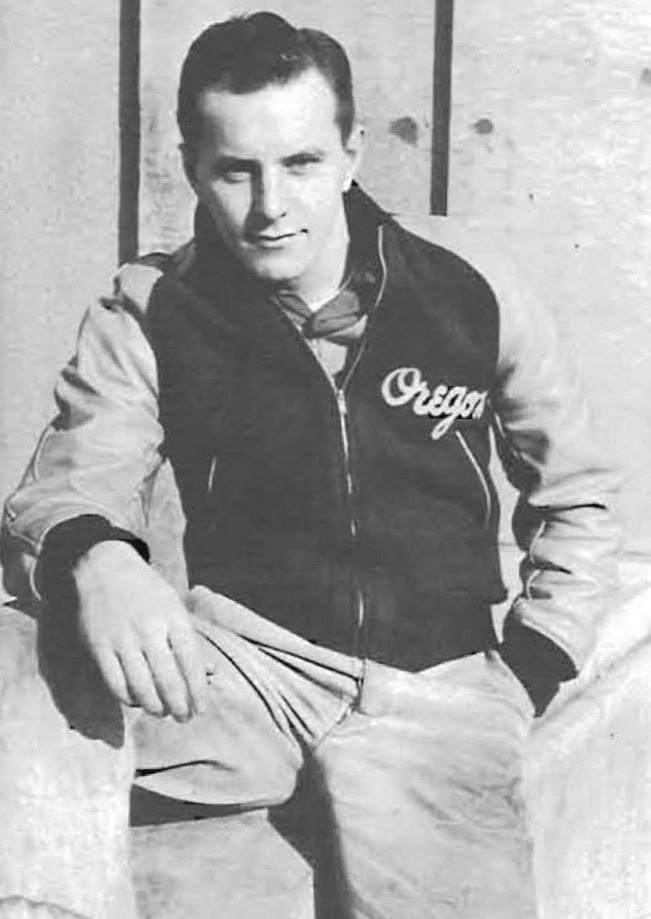
The Webfoots placed three players on 1939 All-American teams, fltr: Lauren Gale, Slim Wintermute, and Bobby Anet.

At the end of the season, Anet, Gale, and Wintermute were selected as All-Americans. In the 1939–40 season, the Webfoots were unable to defend their PCC championship, finishing second behind Oregon State in the division; the following season, all but one of the players from the championship team had graduated, and the Webfoots ended tied for third. The team did not win the Northern Division again until 1944–45. Hobson left the program before the 1947–48 season to become Yale's men's basketball head coach. Gale and Wintermute later played professional basketball in the National Basketball League; both were members of the same team, the Detroit Eagles, and Anet declined an offer to join them. Dick briefly played Amateur Athletic Union (AAU) basketball before embarking on a military career of over 30 years after the U.S. entered World War II. Anet and Johansen joined a Eugene, Oregon-based AAU team, the Rubenstein's Oregonians, and helped the club win a state title and reach the quarterfinals of the AAU's national basketball tournament in 1940. Bob Hardy and Mullen both played minor league baseball, and Mullen reached the major leagues with the Philadelphia Phillies in 1944.

Hobson was inducted into the Basketball Hall of Fame in 1965, and Gale followed him into the Hall 12 years later. The entire 1938–39 Oregon team was enshrined in the Oregon Sports Hall of Fame in 1984, and Anet, Dick, Gale, Hobson, Johansen, and Wintermute were inducted as individuals. The University of Oregon Athletic Hall of Fame selected the team and Hobson as part of its inaugural class of inductees in 1992. Dick and Gale (1993), Wintermute (1994), and Anet and Johansen (1996) were also inducted in later years. All five of the team's starters have had their numbers retired by the university. Oregon's appearance in the semifinals of the NCAA tournament was the only one in program history until the 2016–17 season.

== Bibliography ==
- 2009–10 Oregon Men's Basketball Media Guide (PDF). University of Oregon. 2009. pp. 79–136. Archived from the original (PDF) on March 2, 2012.
- 2015–16 Pac-12 Men's Basketball Media Guide. Pac-12 Conference. 2015.
- ESPN College Basketball Encyclopedia: The Complete History of the Men's Game. Random House. 2009. ISBN 978-0-345-51392-2.
- Frei, Terry (2014). March 1939: Before the Madness: The Story of the First NCAA Basketball Tournament Champions. Taylor Trade Publishing. ISBN 978-1-58979-924-0.
- Wilner, Barry; Rappoport, Ken (2012). The Big Dance: The Story of the NCAA Basketball Tournament. Taylor Trade Publishing. ISBN 978-1-58979-621-8.
