= Oregon Sports Hall of Fame =

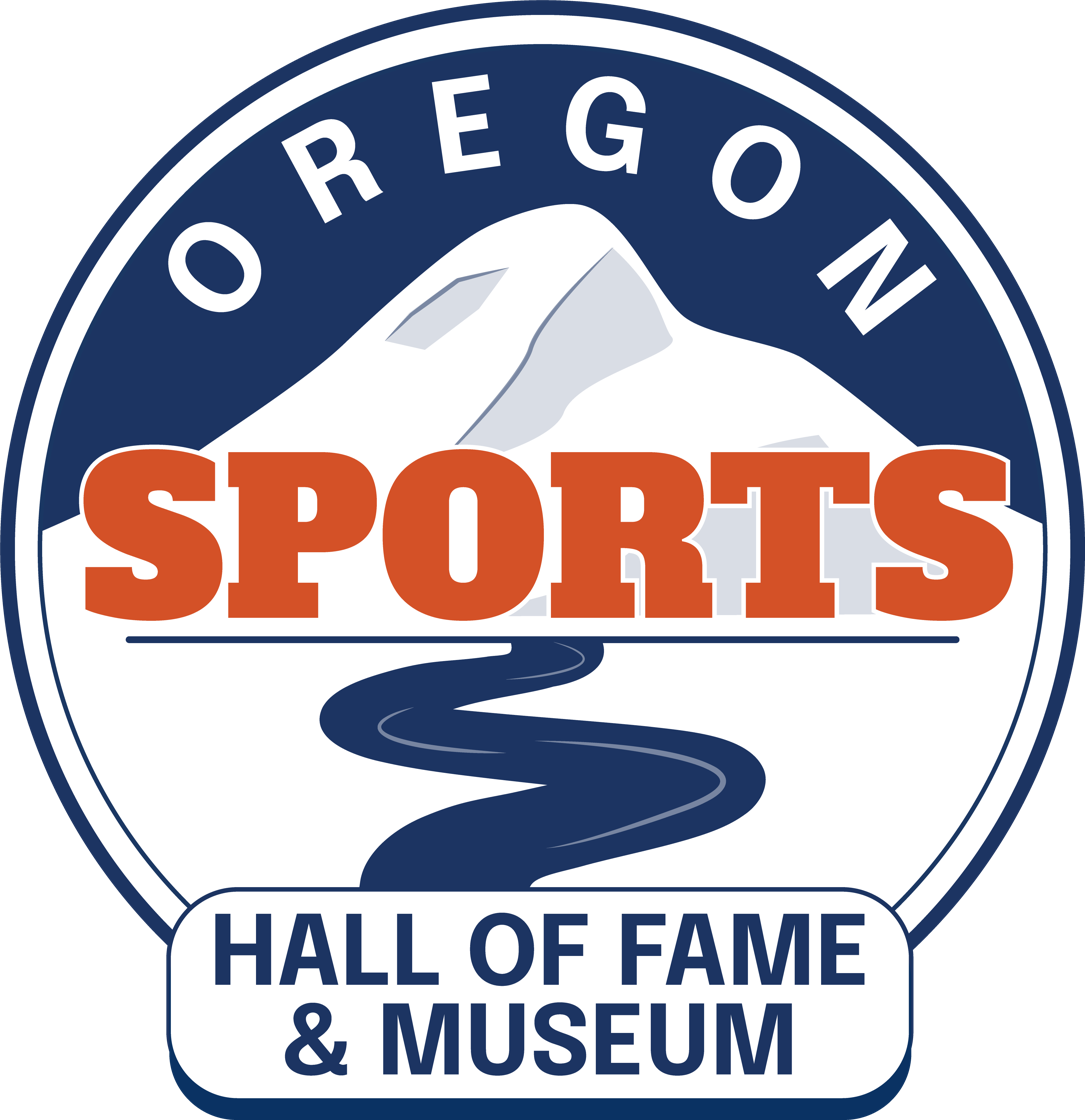
- Established: 1980
- Type: Hall of Fame
- Director: Chuck Richards
- Curator: Bob Akamian
- Website: www.oregonsportshall.org

The Oregon Sports Hall of Fame honors Oregon athletes, teams, coaches, and others who have made a significant contribution to sports in Oregon. The first class was inducted in 1980, with new inductees added every fall. Operated by the Oregon Sports Action, the physical museum is currently closed in preparation for moving to another facility.

== History and organization ==
The Oregon Sports Hall of Fame inducted its first class of 54 members in 1980, a diverse group that included Olympians Mack Robinson, Don Schollander and Frank Troeh, Boston Red Sox legend Johnny Pesky, NFL hero Norm van Brocklin, Heisman Trophy winner Terry Baker, high jump innovator Dick Fosbury, and basketball coaching legend Slats Gill.

New members are inducted each fall, at the Oregon Sports Awards ceremony held in recent years at the Reser Theater in Beaverton, Oregon.

== Scholarships ==
As part of its educational mission to promote the values and rewards of participation in sports, the Oregon Sports Hall of Fame in coordination with the McTarnahan Trust grants scholarships given to outstanding Oregon student athletes who will be attending Oregon colleges. Scholarship winners are honored during the Hall of Fame induction ceremony.

== Facility ==
From 1986 to 1997, the museum was located in a 3,000-square-foot (280 m^{2}) basement under the Standard Insurance Center in downtown Portland, Oregon. In 1997, the museum moved to a nearby facility featuring 7,000 square feet (700 m^{2}) of space with hands-on exhibits, videos, and memorabilia, such as Terry Baker's Heisman Trophy (the first Heisman given to a West Coast athlete), Mack Robinson's Olympic jersey, one of Dale Murphy's Golden Gloves, and Bill Walton's jersey from the 1977 Portland Trail Blazers NBA championship game.

In mid-2008, StanCorp re-claimed the space containing the museum in order to expand their own office space. The museum then relocated to the headquarters of Oregon Sports Action in Beaverton, Oregon with exhibits viewable in the lobby area of a building that also hosted the offices of multiple amateur sports organizations. That building was replaced in 2019, and the museum is currently closed in preparation for moving to an as-yet determined location.

== Inductees ==
The current members of the Oregon Sports Hall of Fame are listed below.

=== Individuals ===
Sport	Hall of Fame members
Adaptive Sports	Aaron Paulson
Auto Racing	Hershel McGriff, Monte Shelton, Len Sutton
Baseball	Earl Averill, Jr., Wally Backman, Eddie Basinski, Bill Beard, Carson "Skeet" Bigbee, Scott Brosius, Bobby Doerr, Howard Fox, Johnny Frederick, George Freese, Joe Gordon, Roy Helser, John Jaha, Larry Jansen, Sylvester Johnson, Ad Liska, Mickey Lolich, Walter McCredie, Dale Murphy, Johnny Pesky, Harold Reynolds, Dave Roberts, Wes Schulmerich, Tom Trebelhorn, Wayne Twitchell, Pete Ward, Dick Whitman, Ken Williams, Wade Williams, Artie Wilson, Jack Wilson, Rick Wise
Basketball	Danny Ainge, Bobby Anet, Greg Ballard, Jim Barnett, Lew Beck, Ray Blume, Jim Boutin, Terrell Brandon, Mel Counts, Cliff Crandall, John Dick, Clyde Drexler, Eddie Durno, Lauren "Laddie" Gale, Dave Gambee, Buck Grayson, A.C. Green, Jim Jarvis, Wally Johansen, Steve Johnson, Fred Jones, Steve Jones, Jerome Kersey, Hunk Latham, Ron Lee, Ed Lewis, Jim Loscutoff, Maurice Lucas, John Mandic, Wally Palmberg, Jim Paxson, Gary Payton, Geoff Petrie, Terry Porter, Mark Radford, Felicia Ragland, Jack Riley, Ephraim "Red" Rocha, Carol Menken-Schaudt, Charlie Sitton, Katy Steding, Damon Stoudamire, Dave Twardzik, Bill Walton, Charlie Warren, Richard Washington, Algot "Swede" Westergren, Urgel "Slim" Wintermute, Lindsey Yamasaki
Bowling	Gloria Bouvia, Marshall Holman, Dave Husted, Tom Perry
Boxing	Joe Kahut, Ray Lampkin, Molly McConnell, Denny Moyer, Tom Moyer
Broadcasting	Bob Blackburn, Doug LaMear, Bill Schonely
Coaching	Barry Adams, Rick Adelman, Pokey Allen, Dee Andros, Thurman Bell, Mike Bellotti, Bill Bowerman, Rich Brooks, Prink Callison, Len Casanova, Mike Clopton, Ralph Coleman, Mouse Davis, Tom DeSylvia, Mike Doherty, Jack Dunn, Paul Durham, Dennis Erickson, Joe Etzel, Dave Gasser, Amory "Slats" Gill, Dick Gray, Harold Hauk, Bill Hayward, Howard Hobson, Joe Huston, Eldon Jenne, Roy S. "Spec" Keene, Don Kirsch, Hank Kuchera, Hal Laycoe, Roy Love, Bill McArthur, Bobb McKittrick, Ralph Miller, Tommy Prothro, E. Robert Quinn, Jack Ramsay, Don Requa, Mike Riley, Nick Robertson, Ad Rutschman, Brad Smith, Fred Spiegelberg, Lon Stiner, Dewey Sullivan, Pete Susick, Dale O. Thomas, James "Mush" Torson, Paul Valenti, Eric Waldorf, John Warren, Ted R. Wilson
Duathlon	Liz Downing
Equestrian	Rich Fellers, Kevin Freeman
Fencing	Michael Marx
Football	Bill Austin, Sam Baker, Terry Baker, Emery Barnes, Steve Barnett, Ted Bates, John Beckett, Bob Berry, Del Bjork, Pete Brock, Stan Brock, Paul Brothers, Vern Burke, Jules "Zuck" Carlson, Ken Carpenter, Ross Carter, Todd Christensen, George Christensen, Jack Crabtree, Jim Dixon, Don Durdan, Brad Ecklund, Bill "Earthquake" Enyart, Dan Fouts, Joe Francis, Russ Francis, Norman "Red" Franklin, Rockne Freitas, Dave Grayson, Bobby Grayson, Quentin Greenough, Bob Grim, Joey Harrington, Mike Hass, Chas "Shy" Huntington, Steven Jackson, Dick James, LaMichael James, Johnny Kitzmiller, Jake Leicht, Woodley Lewis, Percy Locey, Neil Lomax, Howard Maple, Bill McKalip, Mike Mikulak, Chris Miller, Hal Moe, Bill Morgan, Raymond "Butch" Morse, Jack "Mad Dog" O'Billovich, Jack Patera, Pete Pifer, George A. "Gap" Powell, Steve Preece, Ahmad Rashad, Mel Renfro, Reuben Sanders, Ade "Tar" Schwammel, Vic Sears, Jim Shanley, George Shaw, Ken Simonton, Bill Steers, Aaron Thomas, Norman Van Brocklin, Dave Wilcox, John Witte, Len Younce, Gary Zimmerman
Golf	Mary Budke, Bruce Cudd, Jerry Cundari, Bob Duden, Chandler Egan, Bob Gilder, Brian Henninger, Marian Herron, Peter Jacobsen, Don Moe, Millard Rosenblatt, Lara Tennant, Oscar Willing, Dick Yost, Grace DeMoss Zwahlen
Gymnastics	Mary Ayotte-Law, Chari Knight, Joy Selig Petersen
Handball	Ed Grossenbacher, Ryan Grossenbacher, Jack Scrivens
Hockey	Andy Aitkenhead, Don Head, Art Jones, Connie Madigan
Martial Arts	Tom Levak
Masters Athlete	Clive Davies, Robert "Pudgy" Hunt, Robert "Mac" MacTarnahan, Becky Sisley, Lavelle Stoinoff
Multi Sport Athlete	Craig Hanneman, Claude Hines, Dan Jones, Elmer Kolberg, Mel Krause, Danny Miles, Royce McDaniel, Steve Pauly, Sherry Sevall
Officiating	Terry Durham, Jack Folliard, Nate Jones, Jim Joyce, Howard Mayo, Dale Scott
Rodeo	Larry Mahan
Skiing	Gretchen Fraser, Hjalmar Hvam, Bill Johnson, Jean Saubert
Soccer	Clive Charles, Shannon MacMillan, Tiffeny Milbrett
Softball	Margaret Dobson, Carolyn Fitzwater, Betty Evans Grayson, Erv Lind, Teri Mariani, Jackie Rice
Swimming and Diving	Jack Cody, Brenda Helser, Louis "Hap" Kuehn, Nancy Merki Lees, Kim Peyton McDonald, Maureen Murphy, Thelma Payne, Norman Ross, Don Schollander, Della Sehorn, Carolyn Wood, Suzanne Zimmerman
Table Tennis	Judy Bochenski Hoarfrost
Tennis	Sam Lee, Emery Neale, Jack Neer, Jonathan Stark
Track and Field	Margaret Johnson Bailes, Jim Bailey, Percy Bell, Wade Bell, Kelly Blair LaBounty, Dyrol Burleson, Rudy Chapa, Otis Davis, Lance Deal, Bill Dellinger, Ashton Eaton, Dick Fosbury, Alfred "A.C." Gilbert, Jim Grelle, Morgan Groth, Martin Hawkins, Ralph Hill, Joni Huntley, Harry Jerome, Dave Johnson, Dan Kelly, H. W. Kerrigan, Ed Moeller, Kenny Moore, Dan O'Brien, Steve Prefontaine, Mack Robinson, Alberto Salazar, Mary Slaney, Forrest Smithson, Les Steers, Neal Steinhauer, Grant Swan, Jerry Tarr, Brianne Theisen-Eaton, George Varoff, Leann Warren, Mac Wilkins
Trap Shooting	Frank Troeh
Volleyball	Lynda Johnson
Wrestling	Ron Finley, Les Gutches, Jess Lewis, Chester Newton, Robin Reed, Rick Sanders, Greg Strobel
Schonely Lifetime Achievement Award	Don Essig, Larry Sellers
Special Contribution to Sports	Ormond Bean, Rocky Benevento, Morris "Bucky" Buckwalter, Columbia Sportswear (Tim Boyle and Gert Boyle), Leo Davis, Jack Elder, John Eggers, Bob Gill, Harry Glickman, L.H. Gregory, Leo Harris, Tinker Hatfield, Robert A. Hudson, Dwight Jaynes, Tom Jernstedt, Jimmy Jones, Murray Kemp, Philip H. Knight, Knott Street Boxing Club, Dorothea Lensch, Al Lightner, Joe Loprinzi, Anna Maria Lopez, Harry Merlo, Multnomah Athletic Club, Candi Murray, Bob Newland, Nike Inc., G.P. "Jerry" O'Malley, George Pasero, Pendleton Round-Up, Chuck Richards, Rube Ross, Harold Taylor, Tournament Golf Foundation, Rolla Vollstedt, George Yerkovich

=== Teams ===
The Hall of Fame has also inducted these teams:

- 1917 University of Oregon Rose Bowl champions
- 1938–39 Oregon "Tall Firs" basketball team
- 1942 Oregon State Beavers Rose Bowl champions
- 1944 Lind-Pomeroy Amateur Softball Association world champions
- 1948 Oregon Ducks football team
- 1948–49 Oregon State Beavers basketball team
- 1958 Drain Black Sox National Baseball Congress Champions
- 1960–61 Portland Buckaroos
- 1962 Oregon Ducks track team
- 1962 Oregon State Beavers football team
- 1962–63 Oregon State Beavers men's basketball team
- 1964 Oregon Ducks track & field team
- 1964 Erv Lind Softball Amateur Softball Association World Champions
- 1965–66 Oregon State Beavers men's basketball team
- 1966 Linfield Baseball NAIA Champions
- 1967 Oregon State Beavers football team
- 1969 Contractor's, Inc. American Legion Baseball National Champions
- 1975 Portland Timbers soccer team
- 1976–77 Portland Trail Blazers
- 1980–81 Oregon State Beavers men's basketball team
- 1982, 1984, 1986, and 2004 Linfield Football National Champions
- 1994 Oregon Ducks football team
- 2000 Oregon State Beavers football team
- 2002 Portland Pilots soccer team
- 2004, 2008, 2012 Oregon Tech men's basketball teams
- 2006 Oregon State Beavers baseball team
- 2007 Oregon State Beavers baseball team
- East Bank Saloon basketball teams
- Portland Mavericks baseball

== See also ==
- Culture of Portland, Oregon
