= Dave Gasser =

Dave Gasser may refer to:

- Dave Gasser (Canadian football) (born 1942), American-born Canadian football player
- Dave Gasser (baseball coach) (1970s–2020s), American high school baseball coach
