= L. H. Gregory =

American sportswriter (1886–1975)

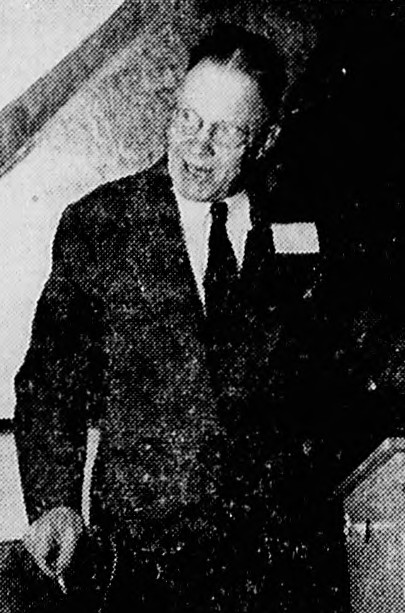
Gregory in 1949

William Lair Hill Gregory (May 18, 1886 – August 15, 1975) was a 20th-century American sportswriter and sports editor for The Oregonian newspaper of Portland, Oregon for more than 50 years. His popular column, "Greg's Gossip," was standard morning reading for several generations of Portland sports fans.

== Early life and career ==
Born in Portland to local attorney William M. Gregory and Lenore Sparks Gregory in 1885, Gregory attended the University of Washington before returning to Portland. He began his sportswriting career for the Oregon Journal, and moved to The Oregonian in 1914 when they offered him a $5 a week raise over his $25 a week salary at the Journal.

== Sports editor and columnist ==
Gregory (who used "L. H." as his byline and was called "Greg" by colleagues and friends) became sports editor at The Oregonian in 1921. He also wrote a daily column called "Greg's Gossip" in which he covered the Portland and national sports scene, paying particular attention to the Portland Beavers baseball team and the local boxing scene, which included fighters such as Joe Kahut, Leo Lomski, Denny Moyer, and Tommy Moyer.

In all, Gregory worked for The Oregonian for 59 years (interrupted briefly while he served in the United States Navy), retiring on August 31, 1973. He died in a Portland nursing home on August 15, 1975.

== Legacy ==
Gregory's creative sportswriting still affects Oregon sports, as many of the nicknames for Oregon sports personalities and teams that he created and popularized in his columns are still in use, including:

- Johnny Pesky, the name he created for Portland Beaver star John Paveskovich (prior to his long career with the Boston Red Sox) since his name didn't fit in headlines
- "The Tall Firs" as the nickname of the 1938–39 Oregon Ducks men's basketball team, winners of the 1939 basketball national championship
- "The Black Tornado" for the Medford High School (later North Medford) football team, coined by Gregory after a convincing victory over a Portland school, and which the school officially adopted to replace the "Tigers"
- "Webfoots" as the first nickname for the University of Oregon sports teams

Gregory refused to refer to Oregon State teams as the "Beavers" since in his opinion, only the Portland baseball team could be called that name. Instead, he would call them "the Orange" or "the Orangemen."

In 1983, Gregory was inducted into both the Oregon Sports Hall of Fame and the Oregon Newspaper Hall of Fame.
