= Laddie Gale =

American basketball player

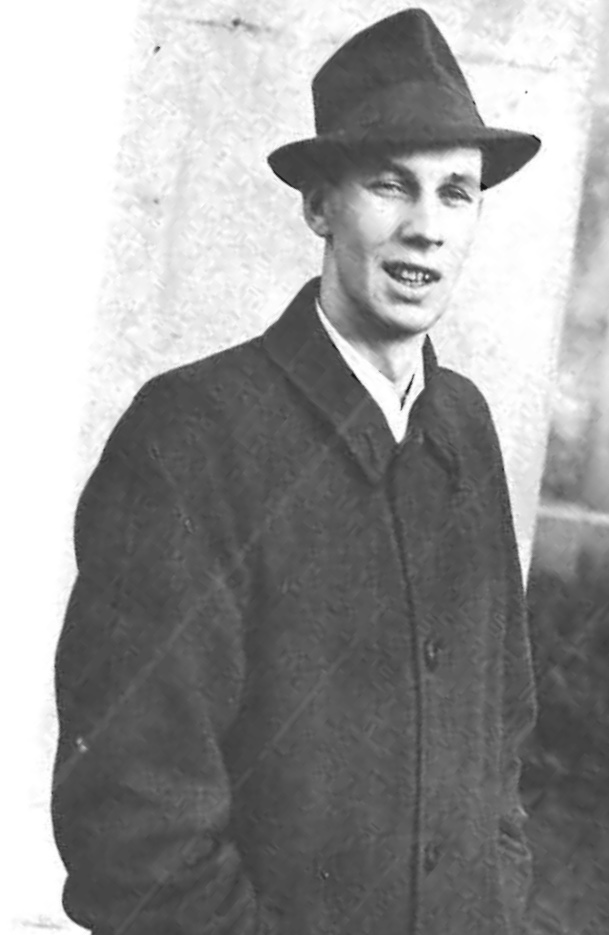
- Gale in 1939

Personal information
- Born: April 22, 1917 Grants Pass, Oregon, U.S.
- Died: July 29, 1996 (aged 79) Gold Beach, Oregon, U.S.
- Listed height: 6 ft 4 in (1.93 m)

Career information
- High school: Oakridge (Oakridge, Oregon)
- College: Oregon (1936–1939)
- Position: Forward

Career history
- 1939–1940: Detroit Eagles

Career highlights
- NCAA champion (1939); First-team All-American – Helms (1939); 2× First-team All-PCC (1938, 1939); No. 28 retired by Oregon Ducks
- Basketball Hall of Fame

Lauren "Laddie" Gale (April 22, 1917 – July 29, 1996) was an American collegiate and professional basketball player.

== NCAA championship ==
A native of Oakridge, Oregon, the 6'4" Gale played forward for the University of Oregon under head coach Howard Hobson. He was the second-tallest player (behind 6'8" Urgel "Slim" Wintermute) on the team, which was dubbed "The Tall Firs."

Gale led the Ducks in scoring in 1938 and 1939, earning All-Pacific Coast Conference honors in each season. In 1939, Gale led the Ducks to a national championship in the first-ever Division I men's basketball tournament.

== Professional career and later years ==
After graduation, Gale played professionally in 1939 and 1940 for the Detroit Eagles of the National Basketball League. He left the Eagles in to serve in World War II, reportedly after being the first Oregon draftee selected by lottery. After the war, he played on several semi-pro teams and retired from basketball in 1949.

He died in Gold Beach, Oregon, on July 29, 1996.

== Halls of Fame ==
For his stellar collegiate play, for being the first college player regularly to employ a one-handed shot, and for helping to popularize the sport of basketball in the American West, Gale was inducted into the Naismith Memorial Basketball Hall of Fame in 1977 and was an inaugural inductee of the Oregon Sports Hall of Fame in 1980. He is also a member of the University of Oregon Hall of Fame.
