= Dewey Sullivan =

American football coach

Dewey Sullivan (May 6, 1935 – November 8, 2006) was an American high school football coach who coached more than 40 years at Dayton High School in Dayton, Oregon. He is a member of the Oregon Sports Hall of Fame.

== Early years ==
Sullivan was born in Geary, Oklahoma and graduated from Western State College in Gunnison, Colorado in 1959.

== Coaching career ==
Sullivan began coaching at Dayton in 1965 and remained until his death in 2006. During his tenure, the team won five state titles and appeared in the playoffs 25 consecutive times. Sullivan won Oregon Coach of the Year honors 24 times, and was named the National High School Coach of the Year by the National Association of Interscholastic Coaches in 2001. With an overall record of 352–84–2, Sullivan was the winningest high school football coach in Oregon history until he was surpassed by Ken Potter in 2024. He ranks among the top 20 in the United States.

Sullivan died of complications from pneumonia in 2006. He was named to the Oregon Sports Hall of Fame the following year.
