= Sam Lee (tennis) =

American tennis player

- Born: June 18, 1914; Oregon, U.S.
- Died: April 9, 2012 (aged 97)
- Education: Stanford University

Sam Lee (June 18, 1914 in Oregon – April 9, 2012), was a former NCAA champion tennis player.

== Biography ==
As a youth tennis player, Lee reached as high as No. 7 in the U.S. tennis rankings for players 15 and under. He attended Stanford University, and as a sophomore, won the 1933 NCAA Doubles Championship with partner Joe Coughlin. Lee won the Oregon state doubles championships with Elwood Cooke in 1936, and the Oregon state singles championship in 1937.

In 1942, Lee was called to service in World War II. In 1945, with Wimbledon suspended due to the war, Lee played in the "Military Wimbledon" tournament. In 1947 and 1948, Lee and partner Emery Neale played in the Wimbledon doubles tournament.

Lee was instrumental in promoting the construction of the Portland Tennis Center in the 1970s, and served as president of the Multnomah Athletic Club. He was inducted into the Oregon Sports Hall of Fame in 1987, the United States Tennis Association Pacific Northwest Hall of Fame in 2000, and is a member of the Stanford Athletic Hall of Fame.
