= John A. Warren =

John Warren

Biographical details
- Born: November 10, 1904; La Grande, Oregon, U.S.
- Died: March 10, 1981 (aged 76); Los Angeles, California, U.S.

Playing career

Football
- 1926–1927: Oregon

Coaching career (HC unless noted)

Football
- 1936–1941: Oregon (freshmen)
- 1942: Oregon

Basketball
- 1944–1945: Oregon
- 1947–1951: Oregon

Head coaching record
- Overall: 2–6 (football); 87–76 (basketball)
- Tournaments: 1–1 (NCAA)

Accomplishments and honors

Championships
- Basketball; 1 PCC (1945)

John Albert "Honest John" Warren (November 10, 1904 – March 10, 1981) was an American football player and coach of football, basketball, baseball, and track. He served as the head football coach the University of Oregon for one season in 1942, tallying a mark of 2–6, and as the head basketball coach at Oregon for five seasons (1944–1945, 1947–1951), compiling a record of 87–76.

== Early life and coaching career ==
Warren was born in La Grande, Oregon, and was raised on a farm near Helix, Oregon. He played on the Oregon Ducks football team in 1926 and 1927.

Warren coached high school basketball at Astoria High School, leading the Fishermen and its two stars Bobby Anet and Wally Johansen to two consecutive state championships in 1934 and 1935. In 1935, Warren was hired as the freshman basketball coach at the University of Oregon, where he coached Johansen and Anet who had enrolled at the school. Four years later, Johansen and Anet were the core of Oregon's 1939 national championship team.

Warren founded John Warren Sporting Goods after purchasing a local hardware store in 1951. The store went out of business shortly after his death in 1981.

== Death ==
Warren died in Los Angeles on March 10, 1981, after suffering a heart attack on February 26, 1981, while on vacation in Mexico.

== Head coaching record ==
=== Football ===
Year	Team	Overall	Conference	Standing	Bowl/playoffs
Oregon Ducks (Pacific Coast Conference) (1942)
1942	Oregon	2–6	2–5	8th	
Oregon:		2–6	2–5		
Total:		2–6			

=== Basketball ===
Record table
Season	Team	Overall	Conference	Standing	Postseason
Oregon Webfoots (Pacific Coast Conference) (1944–1945)
1944–45	Oregon	30–15	11–5	T–1st (North)	NCAA Regional Third Place
Oregon Webfoots (Pacific Coast Conference) (1947–1951)
1947–48	Oregon	18–11	8–8	4th (North)	
1948–49	Oregon	12–18	7–9	T–3rd (North)	
1949–50	Oregon	9–19	6–10	5th (North)	
1950–51	Oregon	18–13	10–6	2nd (North)	
Oregon:		87–76	42–38		
Total:		87–76			
National champion Postseason invitational champion Conference regular season champion Conference regular season and conference tournament champion Division regular season champion Division regular season and conference tournament champion Conference tournament champion
