= John H. Dick =

United States Navy admiral

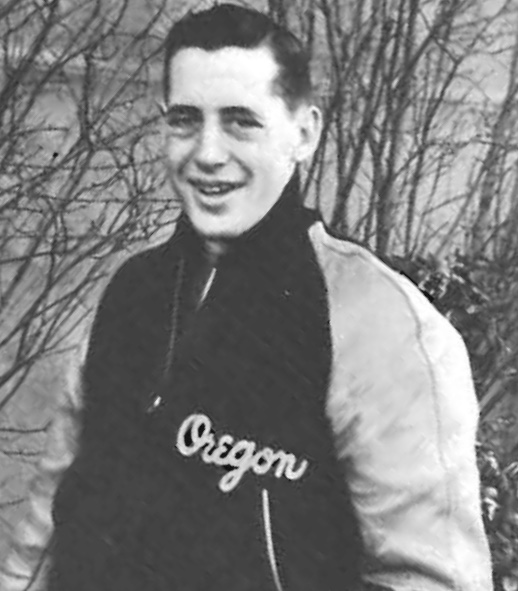
- Dick from the 1939 Oregana
- Born: November 9, 1918; The Dalles, Oregon, U.S.
- Died: September 22, 2011 (aged 92)
- Military career
- Allegiance: United States
- Branch: United States Navy
- Service years: 1942–1973
- Rank: Rear Admiral
- Commands: USS Saratoga (1967–1969)
- Other work: starting forward on Oregon Ducks 1939 NCAA basketball championship team

John H. Dick (November 9, 1918 – September 22, 2011) was an American basketball player and Rear Admiral in the United States Navy.

== College basketball career ==
Dick was born and grew up in The Dalles, Oregon and attended the University of Oregon, where he was a 6-foot-4-inch (1.93 m) forward on the Ducks basketball team from 1938 to 1940.

In 1939, the Ducks won the Northern Division of the Pacific Coast Conference, and then defeated Southern Division champion California to win the conference championship and a berth in the 1939 NCAA basketball championship, the first edition of the tournament. The Ducks defeated Texas and Oklahoma to advance to the championship game against Ohio State. In the championship game, Dick led all scorers with 13 points as the Ducks won 46–33.

Following the championship season, Dick was an All-American for the Ducks in 1940. He also received first-team All-PCC honors.

== U.S. Navy ==
After the United States entered World War II with the attack on Pearl Harbor, Dick enlisted in the United States Navy as an aviator, eventually achieving the rank of rear admiral. From 1967 to 1969, he was the captain of the USS Saratoga supercarrier. He retired from the Navy in 1973.

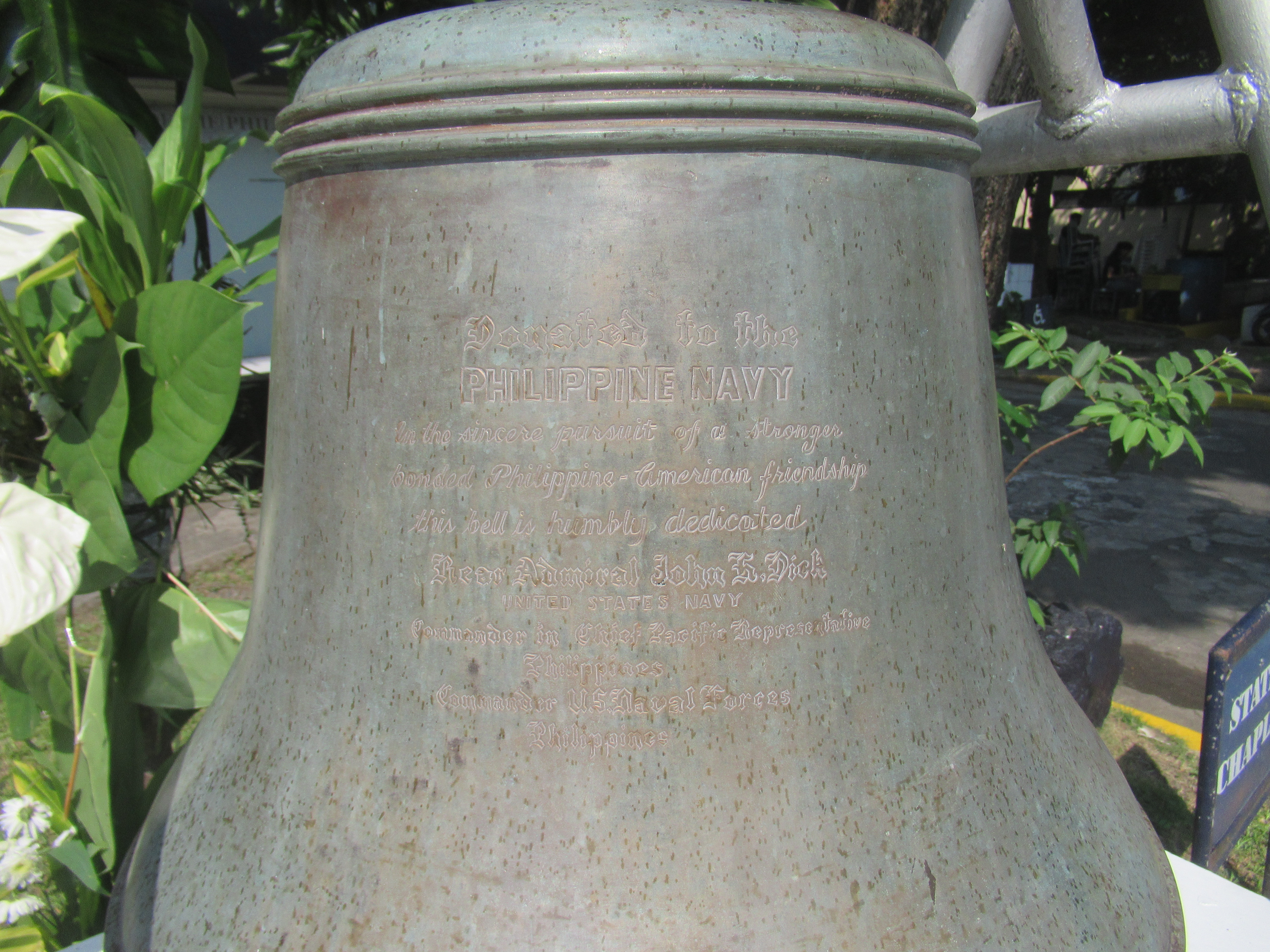
Dick bells in The Chapel of the Holy Child

== Legacy ==
Dick was a charter member of the Oregon Sports Hall of Fame in 1980, and in 1993, was inducted into the University of Oregon Athletic Hall of Fame. Like all starters on their 1939 championship team, Dick's number (18) has been retired by the Ducks. Each year, the Ducks present the Rear Admiral John Dick Award to the team's best defender.

Dick died on September 22, 2011, at the age of 92.
