= Bobby Anet =

American basketball player

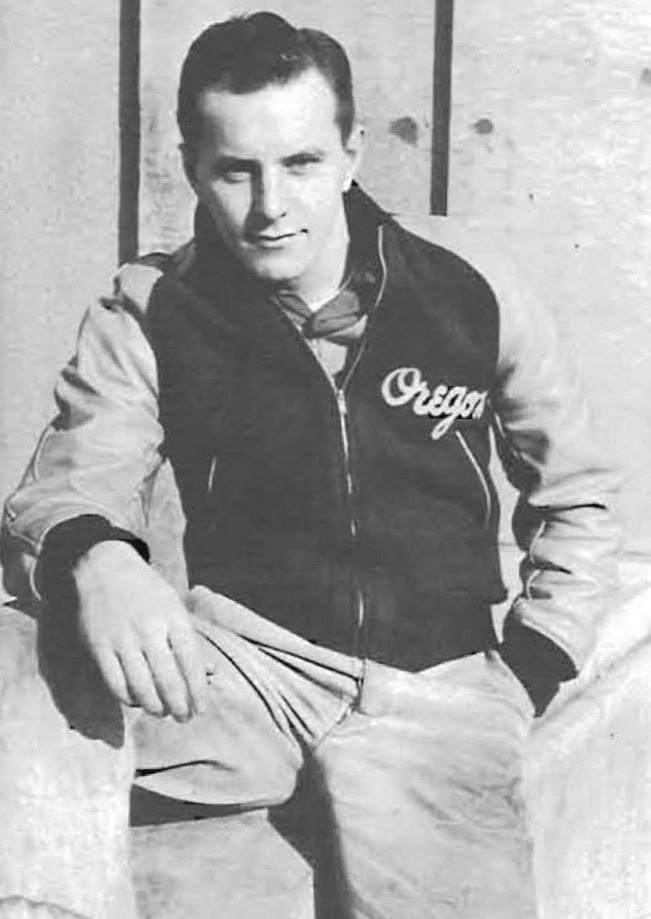
- Anet from the 1939 Oregana

Personal information
- Born: August 11, 1917
- Died: July 25, 1981 (aged 63) Lake Oswego, Oregon, U.S.
- Listed height: 5 ft 8 in (1.73 m)

Career information
- High school: Astoria (Astoria, Oregon)
- College: Oregon (1936–1939)
- Position: Guard
- Number: 20

Career highlights
- NCAA champion (1939); Consensus second-team All-American (1939); No. 20 retired by Oregon Ducks; Member of Oregon Sports Hall of Fame

Charles Robert Anet (August 11, 1917 – July 25, 1981) was a college basketball guard who helped guide the University of Oregon to win the inaugural NCAA Men's Division I Basketball Tournament championship in 1938–39. Aside from scoring 10 points in the 46–33 win over Ohio State in the title game, Anet is most remembered for breaking the championship game trophy when he accidentally knocked it over while diving for a loose ball during play. The damaged trophy contributed to the NCAA's overall loss of $2,531 in the tournament—the only deficit that the event has ever posted.

== Early life ==
A native of Astoria, Oregon, Anet played basketball at Astoria High School. He was a two-time Oregon School Activities Association (OSAA) 4A All-Tournament team member (1934, 1935) while leading Astoria High to two state championships. Following his senior season, his high school coach, John Warren, was hired as the freshman basketball coach at the University of Oregon. Warren recruited Anet and teammate Wally Johansen to play college basketball at the school.

== College ==
In Anet's three seasons playing for the Ducks, he was team captain twice, including his senior season when they won the national championship. He was the smallest player on an historically tall team and measured only 5 ft 8 in (1.73 m) in height but was described as having the biggest heart. Oregon went 74–22 during those three seasons and also won a Pacific Coast Conference championship in the same year as their national title run. By leading Oregon to its only national championship in men's basketball to date, Anet was named a consensus second team All-American. He later had his jersey (#20) retired, and was also inducted into the Oregon Sports Hall of Fame as well as the University of Oregon Sports Hall of Fame.
