= Jimmy Hull =

American basketball player

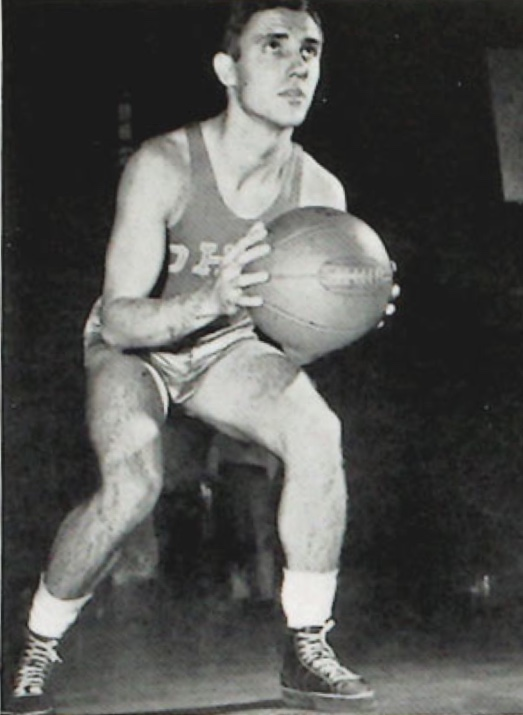
- Hull in the 1938–39 season

Personal information
- Born: February 15, 1917 Leesburg, Ohio, U.S.
- Died: November 2, 1991 (aged 74) Columbus, Ohio, U.S.

Career information
- High school: McClain (Greenfield, Ohio)
- College: Ohio State (1936–1939)
- Position: Forward

Career highlights
- NCAA Final Four Most Outstanding Player (1939); Consensus first-team All-American (1939)

James Robbins Hull Jr. (February 15, 1917 – November 2, 1991) was an American basketball forward who led the Ohio State Buckeyes to the championship game in the first-ever NCAA basketball tournament. The Buckeyes finished the season with a 16–7 record, and lost to the Oregon Ducks in the finals. Hull was named the Most Outstanding Player of that first tournament.

Hull was a two-year starter for the Buckeyes. As a senior and captain of the 1938–1939 team he was the leading scorer in the Big Ten Conference and was a consensus All-America selection.

In 1977 Hull was inducted as a charter member of the Ohio State Varsity O Hall of Fame. In 2007 he was inducted into the Ohio Basketball Hall of Fame.
