= Slim Wintermute =

American basketball player (1917–1977)

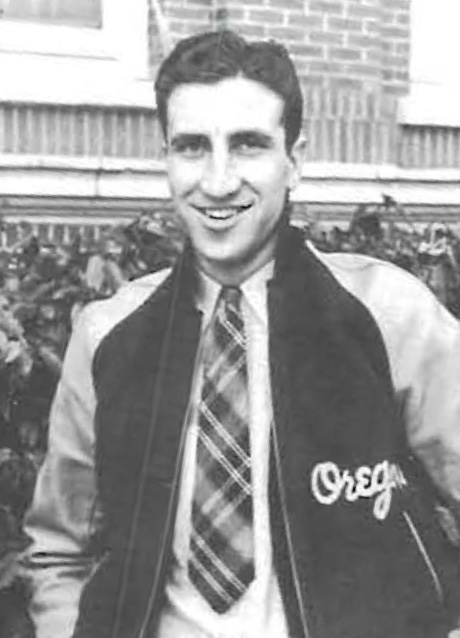
- Wintermute from the 1939 Oregana

Personal information
- Born: July 19, 1917 Portland, Oregon, U.S.
- Died: presumed dead in October, 1977 (aged 60)
- Listed height: 6 ft 8 in (2.03 m)

Career information
- High school: Longview (Longview, Washington)
- College: Oregon (1936–1939)
- Position: Center

Career history
- 1939–1940: Detroit Eagles

Career highlights
- NCAA champion (1939); Consensus first-team All-American (1939); Third-team All-American – Converse (1938); No. 22 retired by Oregon Ducks

Urgel "Slim" Wintermute (born July 9, 1917 – presumed dead October 1977) was an American collegiate and professional basketball player.

== Collegiate career ==
Born in Portland, Oregon, Wintermute attended high school in Longview, Washington. A mobile 6-foot-8-inch (2.03 m) center, Wintermute was a key member of the 1938–39 Oregon Ducks men's basketball team, winners of the first NCAA Tournament championship. Wintermute was voted first-team All-Pacific Coast Conference and named an All-American in 1939. He was elected to the University of Oregon Athletic Hall of Fame in 1994 and is one of six Ducks whose numbers have been retired.

== Professional career ==
Wintermute played professionally for the Detroit Eagles of the National Basketball League. He also served as player/coach for the Portland Indians of the Pacific Coast Professional Basketball League.

== After basketball ==
Following his basketball career, Wintermute worked for Boeing. He was elected to the Oregon Sports Hall of Fame in 1980. On October 21, 1977, Wintermute set out in his yacht from Portage Bay in Seattle's Lake Union and did not return. His boat was found a few days later, with one of Wintermute's friends asleep on the boat who claimed that Slim was still alive when he went to sleep. Wintermute was never found.

== See also ==
- List of people who disappeared at sea
