= Dave Gasser (baseball coach) =

American high school baseball coach

- Known for: Baseball coach

Dave Gasser is an American former high school baseball coach in the state of Oregon. He was inducted into the Oregon Baseball Coaches Hall of Fame in 2004 and the Oregon Sports Hall of Fame in 2022.

== Career ==
Gasser attended Madison High School in Northeast Portland, Oregon, where he played catcher on the baseball team and won a state championship in 1970. After completing his education, he began coaching at Madison High School, where he won eight straight PIL League Championships and eventually coached the team to a state championship in 1981. The following year, Madison High School almost repeated as champions but lost in the championship game 2-3.

Gasser coached the Lakeridge Pacers to a semifinal team in 1995, state champions in 1999 and 2001, and a semifinal team in 2000. The greatest team in Oregon history, the Lakeridge Pacers achieved a record of 30-1, and won the Oregon Class 4A State Championship in 1999 (the equivalent to 6A, the highest division in Oregon high school sports).

Gasser has a coaching record of 76.1% win percentage at the varsity high school level. His varsity coaching record is 750-235, which is the most wins in Oregon baseball history. Additionally, he won five state championships at three different schools, 18 league championships, and twelve state "final four" appearances, which is unprecedented.

In 2002, Gasser briefly retired from baseball, but he returned to coaching at Astoria High School, where he won two more state championships in 2006 and 2009 with the Astoria Fishermen. Gasser retired from coaching baseball in 2017.

=== Notable Lakeridge players coached ===
- Bart Miadich
- Jeff Abney

=== Notable Astoria players coached ===
- Jordan Poyer
