= Howard Hobson =

American basketball coach (1903–1991)

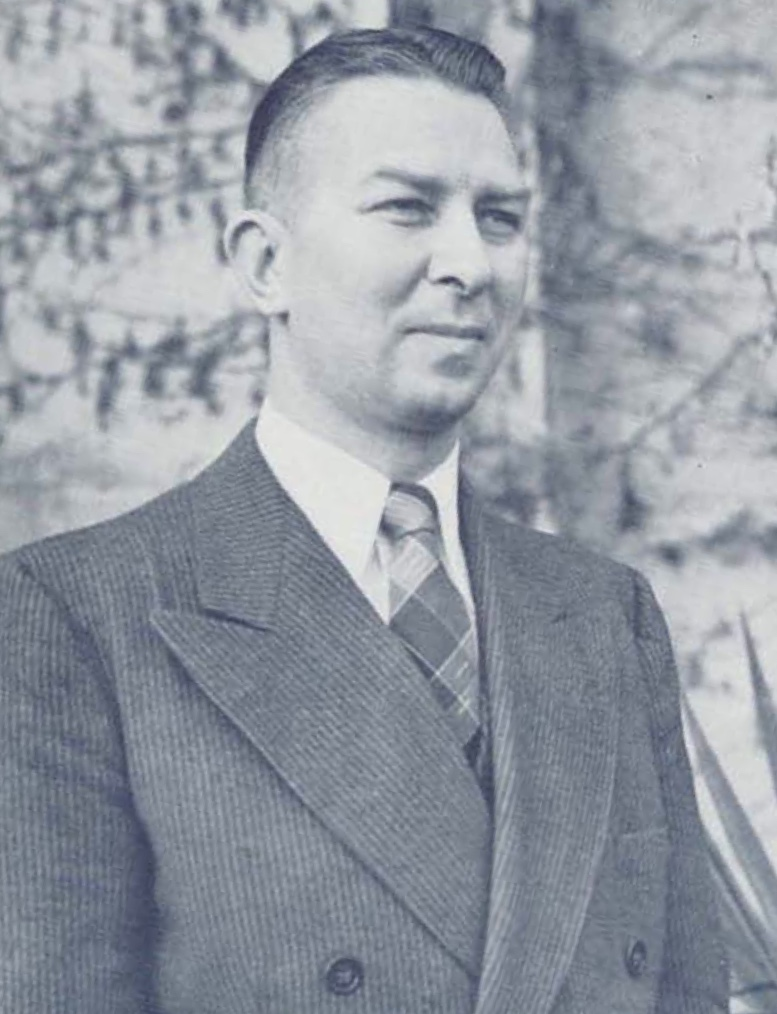
- Hobson in the 1944 Oregana

Biographical details
- Born: July 4, 1903; Portland, Oregon, U.S.
- Died: June 9, 1991 (aged 87); Portland, Oregon, U.S.

Playing career

Basketball
- 1923–1926: Oregon

Coaching career (HC unless noted)

Basketball
- 1932–1935: Southern Oregon Normal
- 1935–1944: Oregon
- 1945–1947: Oregon
- 1947–1956: Yale

Football
- 1929: Cortland Normal
- 1932–1934: Southern Oregon Normal

Baseball
- 1936–1947: Oregon

Head coaching record
- Overall: 401–257 (college basketball); 15–11–1 (college football); 167–75–1 (college baseball)
- Tournaments: Basketball; 3–2 (NCAA)

Accomplishments and honors

Championships
- Basketball; NCAA (1939); PCC (1939); EIBL (1949); 2 PCC North Division (1938, 1939)
- Basketball Hall of Fame; Inducted in 1965 (profile)
- College Basketball Hall of Fame; Inducted in 2006

Howard Andrew "Hobby" Hobson (July 4, 1903 – June 9, 1991) was an American basketball player and coach of football, basketball, and baseball. He served as the head basketball coach at Southern Oregon Normal School—now Southern Oregon University—from 1932 to 1935, at the University of Oregon from 1935 to 1944 and again from 1945 to 1947, and at Yale University from 1947 to 1956, compiling a career college basketball record of 401–257. Hobson's 1938–39 Oregon basketball team won the inaugural NCAA basketball tournament. Hobson authored numerous books on the subject of basketball. He was also the head football coach at Southern Oregon for 1932 to 1934, tallying a mark of 12–7–1, and the head baseball coach at Oregon from 1936 to 1947, amassing a record of 167–75–1. Hobson was inducted into the Naismith Memorial Basketball Hall of Fame as a coach in 1965.

== Playing career ==
Hobson played basketball for four years at Franklin High School in Portland, Oregon, from which he graduated in 1922. During his time there, he was team captain for two years, and led the state championship-winning team in 1921.

He was captain of the University of Oregon's basketball team from 1924 to 1926, and in 1925, his team tied Oregon State for the Pacific Coast Conference title. However, they lost in the playoffs. A year later, the team won the conference title, but lost to the California in the playoffs. This 1926 team was nevertheless undefeated in the conference, with a win record of 10–0. In the same year, he graduated from the university with a bachelor's degree. He went on to obtain a master's degree in 1929 and a doctorate in 1945, both from Columbia University.

== Coaching career ==
Hobson began his coaching career at Kelso High School in Kelso, Washington in 1928, where his team won the league championship. In 1929, he was the head football coach at the Cortland Normal School, now known as State University of New York College at Cortland. From 1930 to 1932, he coached Benson High School in Portland. They won the championship in his final year there. Hobson subsequently led Southern Oregon Normal School to three consecutive league championship victories from 1933 to 1935.

In 1936, Hobson took over as head basketball coach of the University of Oregon Ducks, leading them to three consecutive Pacific Coast Conference titles from 1937 to 1939, culminating in the first-ever NCAA basketball championship in 1939. His 1939 team was known as the "Tall Firs" because of their size: the players averaged about six feet in height, which was considered very tall for a basketball player at the time.

Hobson coached Oregon's basketball and baseball teams from 1936 to 1947, when he left to coach basketball at Yale University. He coached at Yale until 1956, during which time his teams won or shared five Big Three crowns (in 1948, 1949, 1951, 1953, and 1956). The 1949 team was the first NCAA Tournament entry in the school's history and won the Eastern Intercollegiate Basketball League title for the first time in 16 years.

== Legacy ==
Hobson was the first coach to win championships at a major college level on both coasts. He also pioneered intersectional play at Oregon, making the Ducks the first Western team to travel East for games. He repeated this type of intersectional play at Yale, and the 1948–49 team was the first Yale team to appear on the Pacific Coast. His overall record for 27 years as a coach was 495–291.

In 1947, Hobson was named President of the National Association of Basketball Coaches (NABC). For 12 years, he was also a member of the U.S. Olympic Basketball Committee. He served four years as a member and treasurer of the National Basketball Rules Committee and conducted basketball clinics in the U.S. and in 15 foreign countries. On October 13, 1965, Howard Hobson was enshrined as a coach in the Naismith Memorial Basketball Hall of Fame, having also been inducted into the Portland High School, Helms Foundation, Oregon Sports Hall of Fame, and Portland Metro Hall of Fame.

In 1988, he attended the 50th anniversary celebration of the founding of the NCAA Tournament. Hobson died on June 9, 1991.

== Head coaching record ==
=== College basketball ===
Record table
Season	Team	Overall	Conference	Standing	Postseason
Southern Oregon Normal () (1932–1935)
1932–33	Southern Oregon Normal	19–5			
1933–34	Southern Oregon Normal	23–5			
1934–35	Southern Oregon Normal	26–5			
Southern Oregon Normal:		68–15 (.819)			
Oregon Webfoots (Pacific Coast Conference) (1935–1944)
1935–36	Oregon	20–11	7–9	4th (North)	
1936–37	Oregon	20–9	11–5	T–2nd (North)	
1937–38	Oregon	25–8	14–6	1st (North)	
1938–39	Oregon	29–5	14–2	1st (North)	NCAA Champion
1939–40	Oregon	19–12	10–6	2nd (North)	
1940–41	Oregon	18–18	7–9	T–3rd (North)	
1941–42	Oregon	12–15	7–9	4th (North)	
1942–43	Oregon	19–10	10–6	2nd (North)	
1943–44	Oregon	16–10	11–5	2nd (North)	
Oregon Webfoots (Pacific Coast Conference) (1945–1947)
1945–46	Oregon	16–17	8–8	3rd (North)	
1946–47	Oregon	18–9	7–9	4th (North)	
Oregon:		212–124 (.631)	106–74 (.589)		
Yale Bulldogs (Eastern Intercollegiate Basketball League) (1947–1955)
1947–48	Yale	14–13	4–8	6th	
1948–49	Yale	22–8	9–3	1st	NCAA Regional Fourth Place
1949–50	Yale	17–9	7–5	T–3rd	
1950–51	Yale	14–13	5–8	5th	
1951–52	Yale	14–14	4–8	T–5th	
1952–53	Yale	10–15	6–6	T–3rd	
1953–54	Yale	12–14	7–7	4th	
1954–55	Yale	3–21	3–11	T–6th	
Yale Bulldogs (Ivy League) (1955–1956)
1955–56	Yale	15–11	7–7	T–5th	
Yale:		121–118 (.506)	52–63 (.452)		
Total:		401–257 (.609)			
National champion Postseason invitational champion Conference regular season champion Conference regular season and conference tournament champion Division regular season champion Division regular season and conference tournament champion Conference tournament champion

=== College football ===
Year	Team	Overall	Conference	Standing	Bowl/playoffs
Cortland Normal Red Dragons (Independent) (1929–present)
1929	Cortland Normal	3–4			
Cortland Normal:		3–4			
Southern Oregon Normal (Independent) (1932–1934)
1932	Southern Oregon Normal	4–1–1			
1933	Southern Oregon Normal	6–2			
1934	Southern Oregon Normal	2–4			
Southern Oregon Normal:		12–7–1			
Total:		15–11–1			

== See also ==
- List of NCAA Division I Men's Final Four appearances by coach
