= 1939 NCAA basketball tournament =

Edition of USA college basketball tournament

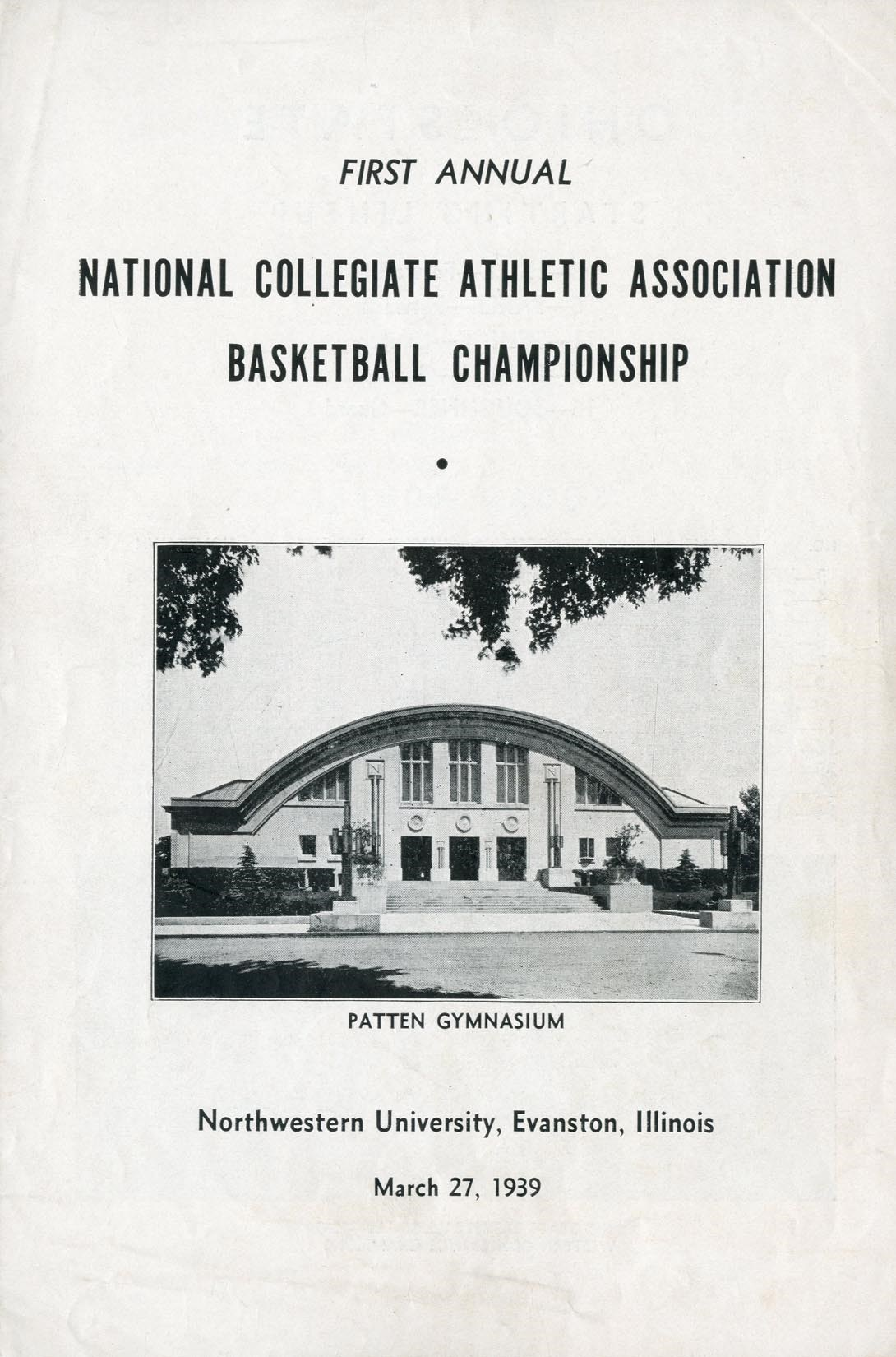
- Teams: 8
- Finals site: Patten Gymnasium, Evanston, Illinois
- Champions: Oregon Webfoots (1st title, 1st title game, 1st Final Four)
- Runner-up: Ohio State Buckeyes (1st title game, 1st Final Four)
- Semifinalists: Oklahoma Sooners (1st Final Four); Villanova Wildcats (1st Final Four)
- Winning coach: Howard Hobson (1st title)
- MOP: Jimmy Hull, (Ohio State)
- Attendance: 15,025
- Top scorer: Jimmy Hull, (Ohio State) (58 points)

The 1939 NCAA basketball tournament involved eight schools playing in single-elimination play to determine the NCAA Men's Division I Basketball Championship. It was the 1st NCAA basketball national championship tournament, although it was operated by the National Association of Basketball Coaches (NABC) at the time.

The tournament began on March 17, 1939, and ended with the championship game on March 27, at the Patten Gymnasium on Northwestern University's campus in Evanston, Illinois. A total of eight games were played, including a single third-place game in the West region. The East region did not hold a third-place game until 1941, and there was no national third-place game until 1946.

Oregon, coached by Howard Hobson, won the national title with a 46–33 victory in the final game over Ohio State, coached by Harold Olsen. Jimmy Hull of Ohio State was named the tournament's Most Outstanding Player.

Despite its success in this first tournament, Oregon would not make another Final Four until 2017.

== Tournament procedure ==
One team would represent each of the NCAA's eight geographic districts for a total of eight teams. Each district had a selection committee which determined their representative; one district elected to hold a playoff to determine the bid. In the bracket, the four eastern districts met for the East Regional, and the four western districts met for the West Regional; the champions of each region met in Evanston, Illinois for the championship game.

== 1939 NCAA tournament schedule and venues ==
The following are the sites selected to host each round of the 1939 tournament:

=== Regionals ===
March 17 and 18
East Regional, The Palestra, Philadelphia, Pennsylvania (Host: University of Pennsylvania)

March 20 and 21
West Regional, California Coliseum, San Francisco, California (Host: University of San Francisco)

=== Championship Game ===
March 30
Patten Gymnasium, Evanston, Illinois (Host: Northwestern University)

== Selection of teams ==
One team was selected from each NCAA district

=== District decisions ===
District selection committees decided upon their representative, with most analyzing the top teams and selecting one. Districts 2, 6, and 8 invited Villanova, Texas, and Oregon, respectively, who accepted their invitations. Other districts had their first choice decline the invitation. District 1 initially selected Dartmouth, the Eastern Intercollegiate Basketball League champion, but they declined the invitation and the committee subsequently invited independent Brown. District 3 selected Southern Conference champion Wake Forest over Southern Conference tournament champion Clemson and Southeastern Conference tournament champion Kentucky. District 4 selected independent Bradley, but they elected to participate in the National Invitation Tournament instead; the committee then invited their second-best team, Ohio State, the Big Ten champion. District 7 selected Colorado, the champion of the Mountain States Conference but they declined the invitation due to not wanting to travel again after a mid-season trip to New York City. Utah State was instead invited to represent District 7.

==== District 5 playoff ====
One district, District 5, decided to host a four-team playoff in Oklahoma City to determine which team would represent them in the tournament. The committee invited Missouri and Oklahoma from the Big 6 Conference and Oklahoma A&M and Drake from the Missouri Valley Conference. However, Missouri declined the invitation to the playoff. Oklahoma A&M defeated Drake in the first round of the playoffs, and Oklahoma won the second game against A&M to advance to the tournament.

First Round; March 13		Second Round; March 14
		Oklahoma	30
Oklahoma A&M	23	Oklahoma A&M	21
Drake	22

=== Tournament teams ===
East Regional – The Palestra, Philadelphia, PA
School	Coach	Conference	NCAA District	Record
Brown	Eck Allen	Independent	District 1	16–3
Ohio State	Harold Olsen	Big Ten	District 4	14–6
Villanova	Alex Severance	Independent	District 2	19–4
Wake Forest	Murray Greason	Southern	District 3	18–5

West Regional – California Coliseum, San Francisco, CA
School	Coach	Conference	NCAA District	Record
Oklahoma	Bruce Drake	Big Six	District 5	11–8
Oregon	Howard Hobson	Pacific Coast	District 8	26–5
Texas	Jack Gray	Southwest	District 6	19–4
Utah State	Dick Romney	Mountain States	District 7	16–6

== Bracket ==
Regional Semifinals
March 17
Villanova	42
Brown	30
East – Philadelphia
Ohio State	64
Wake Forest	52
March 20
Oregon	56
Texas	41
West – San Francisco
Utah State	39
Oklahoma	50

Regional Finals
March 18
Villanova	36
Ohio State	53
March 21
Oregon	55
Oklahoma	37
West Third Place Game
March 21
Texas	49
Utah State	51

National Championship
Evanston, Illinois – March 27
Ohio State	33
Oregon	46

== See also ==
- 1939 National Invitation Tournament
- 1939 NAIA basketball tournament
