= 1938–39 NCAA men's basketball season =

Men's collegiate basketball season

- National Championship: Patten Gymnasium; Evanston, Illinois
- NCAA Champions: Oregon Webfoots
- Helms National Champions: Long Island Blackbirds (retroactive selection in 1943)
- Other champions: Long Island (NIT)
- Player of the Year (Helms): Chet Jaworski, Rhode Island Rams (retroactive selection in 1944)

The 1938–39 NCAA men's basketball season began in December 1938, progressed through the regular season and conference tournaments, and concluded with the 1939 NCAA basketball tournament championship game on March 27, 1939, at Patten Gymnasium in Evanston, Illinois. The Oregon Webfoots won the first NCAA national championship with a 46–33 victory over the Ohio State Buckeyes.

== Rule changes ==
After a team makes a free throw as a result of a technical foul, it retains possession and throws the ball in from out of bounds. Previously, a jump ball at center court had taken place after a team shot a free throw as a result of a technical foul.

== Season headlines ==
- The Mountain States Athletic Conference, popularly known as the Mountain States Conference and the Skyline Conference, began play, with seven original members. The Rocky Mountain Athletic Conference became a non-major conference after the departure of seven of its larger members for the Skyline Conference.
- The practice of naming a Consensus All-American Second Team began.
- The NCAA tournament was held for the first time, operated by the National Association of Basketball Coaches rather than the National Collegiate Athletic Association itself. Eight teams competed. In the first game, Villanova defeated Brown 42–30 in Philadelphia, Pennsylvania, on March 17, and Oregon defeated Ohio State 46–33 in Evanston, Illinois, in the first championship game on March 27. Jimmy Hull of Ohio State was named the NCAA basketball tournament Most Outstanding Player. The tournament lost $2,500; although 5,000 fans attended the championship game, many of the tickets were given away. The NCAA viewed its champion as the official national champion, the National Invitation Tournament, which had debuted the previous year, widely was considered the more prestigious of the two tournaments and the "true" national championship tournament through at least the mid-1950s, with better teams often choosing the NIT over the NCAA or playing in both tournaments in the same year.
- Howard Hobson of Oregon became the first head coach to win the NCAA tournament at his alma mater.
- Bruce Drake of Oklahoma became the first head coach to lead his team to a finish among the final four teams in the NCAA tournament in his first season as a head coach.
- The Eastern Intercollegiate Conference and the Northern California Conference both disbanded at the end of the season.
- In February 1943, the Helms Athletic Foundation retroactively selected Long Island, the 1938 National Invitation Tournament winner, as its national champion for the 1938–39 season.
- In 1995, the Premo-Porretta Power Poll retroactively selected Long Island as its top-ranked team for the 1938–39 season.

== Conference membership changes ==
School	Former conference	New conference
BYU Cougars	Rocky Mountain Athletic Conference	Mountain States (Skyline) Conference
Colorado Buffaloes	Rocky Mountain Athletic Conference	Mountain States (Skyline) Conference
Colorado State Rams	Rocky Mountain Athletic Conference	Mountain States (Skyline) Conference
Denver Pioneers	Rocky Mountain Athletic Conference	Mountain States (Skyline) Conference
Utah Redskins	Rocky Mountain Athletic Conference	Mountain States (Skyline) Conference
Utah State Aggies	Rocky Mountain Athletic Conference	Mountain States (Skyline) Conference
Wyoming Cowboys	Rocky Mountain Athletic Conference	Mountain States (Skyline) Conference

== Regular season ==
=== Conferences ===
==== Conference winners and tournaments ====
Conference	Regular season winner	Conference player of the year	Conference tournament	Tournament venue (City)	Tournament winner
Big Six Conference	Missouri & Oklahoma	None selected	No Tournament		
Big Ten Conference	Ohio State	None selected	No Tournament		
Border Conference	New Mexico State	None selected	No Tournament		
Eastern Intercollegiate Basketball League	Dartmouth	None selected	No Tournament		
Eastern Intercollegiate Conference	Carnegie Tech & Georgetown	None selected	No Tournament		
Metropolitan New York Conference	Long Island	None selected	No Tournament		
Missouri Valley Conference	Drake & Oklahoma A&M	None selected	No Tournament		
Mountain States (Skyline) Conference	Colorado		No Tournament		
New England Conference	Rhode Island State		No Tournament		
Northern California Conference	Santa Clara		No Tournament		
Pacific Coast Conference	Oregon (North); USC (South)		No Tournament; Oregon defeated USC in best-of-three conference championship playoff series		
Southeastern Conference	Kentucky	None selected	1939 SEC men's basketball tournament	Alumni Memorial Gym (Knoxville, Tennessee)	Kentucky
Southern Conference	Wake Forest	None selected	1939 Southern Conference men's basketball tournament	Thompson Gym (Raleigh, North Carolina)	Clemson
Southwest Conference	Texas	None selected	No Tournament		

==== Conference standings ====
1938–39 Big Six Conference men's basketball standings
	Conf.				Overall
Team	W		L	PCT	W		L	PCT
Missouri	7	–	3	.700	12	–	6	.667
Oklahoma	7	–	3	.700	12	–	6	.667
Kansas	6	–	4	.600	13	–	7	.650
Iowa State	5	–	5	.500	8	–	9	.471
Nebraska	3	–	7	.300	7	–	13	.350
Kansas State	2	–	8	.200	5	–	13	.278

1938–39 Big Ten Conference men's basketball standings
	Conf.				Overall
Team	W		L	PCT	W		L	PCT
Ohio State	10	–	2	.833	16	–	7	.696
Indiana	9	–	3	.750	17	–	3	.850
Illinois	8	–	4	.667	14	–	5	.737
Minnesota	7	–	5	.583	14	–	6	.700
Purdue	6	–	6	.500	12	–	7	.632
Northwestern	5	–	7	.417	7	–	13	.350
Michigan	4	–	8	.333	11	–	9	.550
Wisconsin	4	–	8	.333	10	–	10	.500
Chicago	4	–	8	.333	9	–	11	.450
Iowa	3	–	9	.250	8	–	11	.421

1938–39 Border Conference men's basketball standings
	Conf.				Overall
Team	W		L	PCT	W		L	PCT
New Mexico A&M	14	–	2	.875	20	–	4	.833
Texas Tech	13	–	5	.722	13	–	6	.684
Arizona State–Flagstaff	12	–	6	.667	13	–	11	.542
Arizona State–Tempe	11	–	11	.500	13	–	13	.500
Arizona	8	–	10	.444	12	–	11	.522
Texas State M&M	6	–	12	.333	6	–	13	.316
New Mexico	4	–	16	.200	4	–	21	.160

1938–39 Eastern Intercollegiate Basketball League standings
	Conf.				Overall
Team	W		L	PCT	W		L	PCT
Dartmouth	10	–	2	.833	18	–	5	.783
Columbia	9	–	3	.750	11	–	5	.688
Cornell	7	–	5	.583	12	–	12	.500
Princeton	6	–	6	.500	10	–	9	.526
Penn	6	–	6	.500	7	–	11	.389
Yale	3	–	9	.250	4	–	16	.200
Harvard	1	–	11	.083	5	–	14	.263

1938–39 Eastern Intercollegiate Conference men's basketball standings
	Conf.				Overall
Team	W		L	PCT	W		L	PCT
Carnegie Tech	6	–	4	.600	12	–	7	.632
Georgetown	6	–	4	.600	13	–	9	.591
Penn State	5	–	5	.500	13	–	10	.565
Pittsburgh	5	–	5	.500	10	–	8	.556
West Virginia	4	–	6	.400	10	–	9	.526
Temple	4	–	6	.400	10	–	12	.455

1938–39 Metropolitan New York Conference men's basketball standings
	Conf.				Overall
Team	W		L	PCT	W		L	PCT
LIU	21	–	0	1.000	24	–	0	1.000
St. John's	17	–	2	.895	18	–	4	.818
Manhattan	12	–	5	.706	12	–	5	.706
St. Francis (NY)	15	–	7	.682	15	–	7	.682
CCNY	11	–	6	.647	11	–	6	.647
Fordham	10	–	8	.556	10	–	8	.556
Brooklyn	9	–	8	.529	9	–	8	.529
NYU	11	–	11	.500	11	–	11	.500

1938–39 Missouri Valley Conference men's basketball standings
	Conf.				Overall
Team	W		L	PCT	W		L	PCT
Oklahoma A&M	11	–	3	.786	19	–	8	.704
Drake	11	–	3	.786	14	–	7	.667
Grinnell	8	–	6	.571	14	–	7	.667
Tulsa	8	–	6	.571	15	–	8	.652
Creighton	7	–	7	.500	11	–	12	.478
Washington University	6	–	8	.429	11	–	10	.524
Saint Louis	3	–	11	.214	5	–	16	.238
Washburn	2	–	12	.143	4	–	18	.182

1938–39 Mountain States Conference men's basketball standings
	Conf.				Overall
Team	W		L	PCT	W		L	PCT
Colorado	10	–	2	.833	14	–	4	.778
Utah State	8	–	4	.667	17	–	7	.708
Utah	7	–	5	.583	13	–	7	.650
Wyoming	7	–	5	.583	10	–	11	.476
BYU	4	–	8	.333	12	–	12	.500
Denver	4	–	8	.333	5	–	13	.278
Colorado State	2	–	10	.167	2	–	14	.125

1938–39 New England Conference men's basketball standings
	Conf.				Overall
Team	W		L	PCT	W		L	PCT
Rhode Island State	7	–	1	.875	17	–	4	.810
Connecticut	6	–	2	.750	12	–	6	.667
Maine	4	–	4	.500	8	–	4	.667
Northeastern	3	–	5	.375	6	–	12	.333
New Hampshire	0	–	8	.000	3	–	14	.176

1938–39 Northern California Conference men's basketball standings
	Conf.				Overall
Team	W		L	PCT	W		L	PCT
Santa Clara	7	–	1	.875	15	–	5	.750
San Jose State	5	–	3	.625	11	–	7	.611
San Francisco	4	–	4	.500	7	–	10	.412
Saint Mary's	3	–	5	.375	11	–	10	.524
Pacific	1	–	7	.125	5	–	14	.263

1938–39 Pacific Coast Conference men's basketball standings
	Conf.				Overall
Team	W		L	PCT	W		L	PCT
North
Oregon †	14	–	2	.875	29	–	5	.853
Washington	11	–	5	.688	20	–	5	.800
Washington State	8	–	8	.500	23	–	10	.697
Oregon State	6	–	10	.375	13	–	11	.542
Idaho	1	–	15	.063	12	–	19	.387
South
California	9	–	3	.750	24	–	8	.750
USC	9	–	3	.750	20	–	5	.800
Stanford	6	–	6	.500	16	–	9	.640
UCLA	0	–	12	.000	7	–	20	.259
† Conference playoff series winner

1938–39 Rocky Mountain Conference men's basketball standings
	Conf.				Overall
Team	W		L	PCT	W		L	PCT
Colorado State–Greeley	7	–	3	.700	11	–	6	.647
Colorado College	4	–	2	.667	14	–	5	.737
Montana State	4	–	2	.667	18	–	11	.621
Western State (CO)	5	–	5	.500	12	–	8	.600
Colorado Mines	0	–	8	.000	0	–	13	.000

1938–39 Southeastern Conference men's basketball standings
	Conf.				Overall
Team	W		L	PCT	W		L	PCT
Alabama	13	–	4	.765	16	–	5	.762
Georgia	8	–	3	.727	11	–	6	.647
Kentucky †	5	–	2	.714	16	–	4	.800
LSU	10	–	5	.667	13	–	7	.650
Auburn	8	–	4	.667	16	–	6	.727
Vanderbilt	7	–	5	.583	14	–	7	.667
Florida	5	–	4	.556	9	–	6	.600
Tennessee	6	–	5	.545	14	–	7	.667
Georgia Tech	4	–	7	.364	6	–	9	.400
Mississippi State	5	–	10	.333	8	–	12	.400
Tulane	3	–	6	.333	5	–	13	.278
Ole Miss	4	–	10	.286	10	–	16	.385
Sewanee	0	–	13	.000	1	–	16	.059
† Regular-season championship and SEC Tournament winner

1938–39 Southern Conference men's basketball standings
	Conf.				Overall
Team	W		L	PCT	W		L	PCT
Wake Forest	15	–	3	.833	18	–	6	.750
Maryland	8	–	3	.727	15	–	9	.625
Washington and Lee	8	–	3	.727	13	–	9	.591
The Citadel	7	–	3	.700	14	–	5	.737
Davidson	9	–	7	.563	19	–	10	.655
North Carolina	8	–	7	.533	10	–	11	.476
North Carolina State	7	–	6	.538	10	–	7	.588
Duke	8	–	8	.500	10	–	12	.455
Clemson †	6	–	6	.500	16	–	8	.667
VMI	6	–	6	.500	7	–	10	.412
Richmond	5	–	5	.500	10	–	10	.500
William & Mary	4	–	9	.308	9	–	12	.429
South Carolina	2	–	8	.200	5	–	18	.217
Virginia Tech	2	–	10	.167	3	–	14	.176
Furman	0	–	10	.000	6	–	16	.273
† Southern Conference Tournament winner

1938–39 Southwest Conference men's basketball standings
	Conf.				Overall
Team	W		L	PCT	W		L	PCT
Texas	10	–	2	.833	19	–	6	.760
Arkansas	9	–	3	.750	18	–	5	.783
SMU	8	–	4	.667	14	–	8	.636
Baylor	7	–	5	.583	14	–	7	.667
Rice	6	–	6	.500	10	–	11	.476
Texas A&M	2	–	10	.167	7	–	16	.304
TCU	0	–	12	.000	2	–	17	.105

=== Major independents ===
A total of 48 college teams played as major independents. Loyola of Illinois (21–1) had the best winning percentage (.955). Western Kentucky State| (22–3) and Marshall (22–5) finished with the most wins.

1938–39 NCAA men's basketball independents standings
	Conf.				Overall
Team	W		L	PCT	W		L	PCT
Loyola (Ill.)		–		–	21	–	1	.955
Western Kentucky State		–		–	22	–	3	.880
Army		–		–	13	–	2	.867
Bradley		–		–	19	–	3	.864
Marshall		–		–	22	–	5	.815
Brown		–		–	16	–	4	.800
Siena		–		–	8	–	2	.800
Villanova		–		–	20	–	5	.800
Syracuse		–		–	15	–	4	.789
Duquesne		–		–	14	–	4	.778
Detroit		–		–	15	–	5	.750
Virginia		–		–	15	–	5	.750
Boston University		–		–	10	–	4	.714
Notre Dame		–		–	15	–	6	.714
Cincinnati		–		–	12	–	5	.706
Marquette		–		–	12	–	5	.706
Butler		–		–	14	–	6	.700
La Salle		–		–	13	–	6	.684
DePaul		–		–	15	–	7	.682
Seton Hall		–		–	15	–	7	.682
Lehigh		–		–	10	–	5	.667
Xavier		–		–	13	–	7	.650
Bowling Green State		–		–	12	–	7	.632
Toledo		–		–	17	–	10	.630
Montana State		–		–	18	–	11	.621
George Washington		–		–	13	–	8	.619
Muhlenberg		–		–	13	–	8	.619
Ohio		–		–	12	–	8	.600
St. Bonaventure		–		–	10	–	7	.588
Niagara		–		–	11	–	8	.579
Navy		–		–	8	–	6	.571
Rutgers		–		–	8	–	6	.571
Montana		–		–	17	–	13	.567
Michigan State Normal		–		–	9	–	8	.529
Indiana State		–		–	10	–	9	.526
Kent State		–		–	12	–	11	.522
Bucknell		–		–	8	–	8	.500
Loyola (Md.)		–		–	10	–	13	.435
St. Joseph's		–		–	9	–	12	.429
Wichita Municipal		–		–	9	–	12	.429
Western State Teachers		–		–	7	–	10	.412
Lafayette		–		–	6	–	11	.353
Valparaiso		–		–	5	–	10	.333
Colgate		–		–	6	–	13	.316
Miami (Ohio)		–		–	5	–	13	.278
Dayton		–		–	2	–	12	.143
Louisville		–		–	1	–	15	.063
Canisius		–		–	0	–	13	.000

== Post-Season Tournaments ==
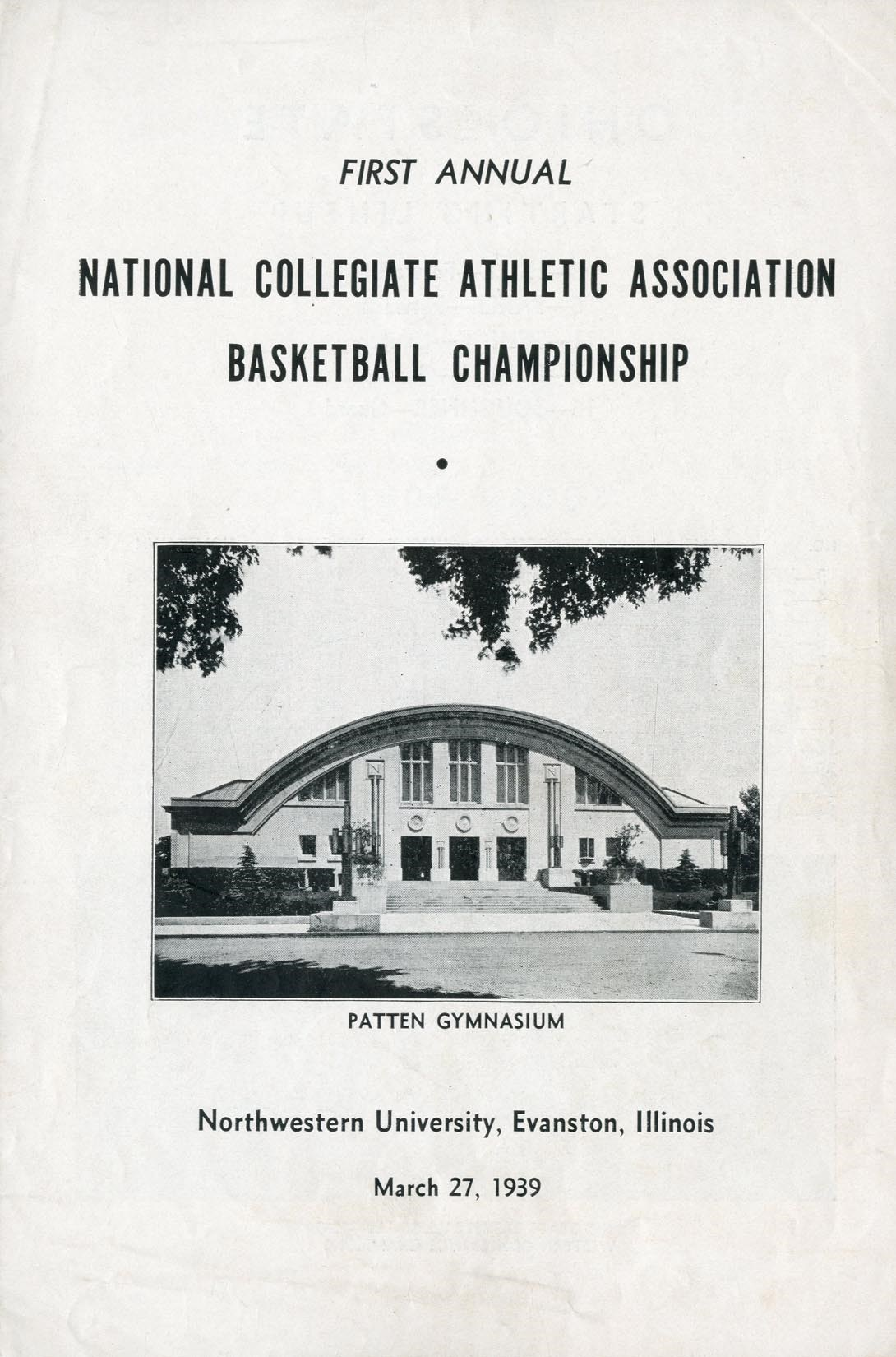
The inaugural NCAA tournament championship game was played on March 27, 1939 at Patten Gymnasium on the campus of Northwestern University in Evanston, Illinois.

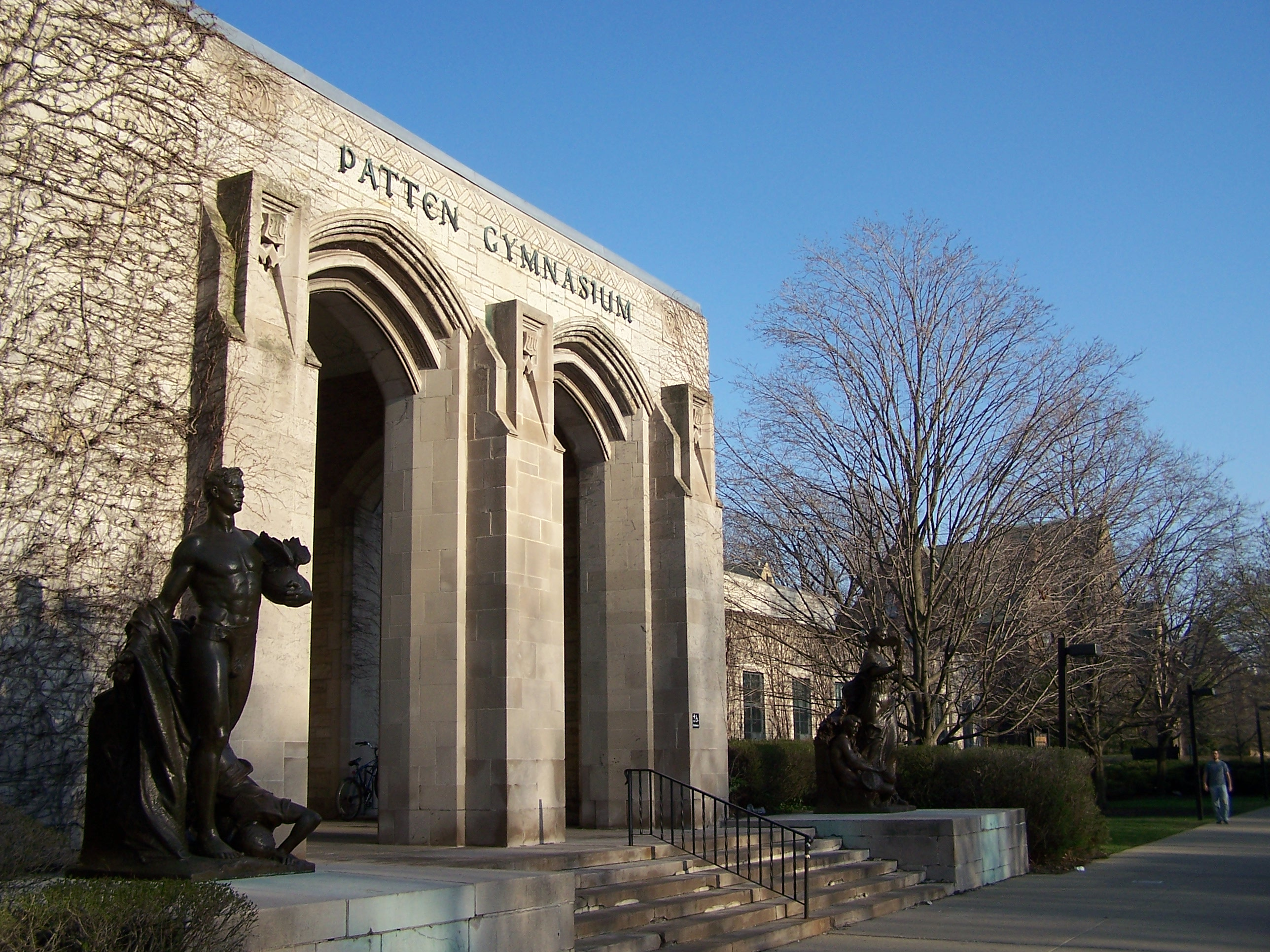
Patten Gymnasiun in April 2008. It hosted the 1939 NCAA men's Final Four.

=== NCAA Tournament ===
==== Semifinals & final ====
National Semifinals
Villanova	36
Ohio State	53
Oregon	55
Oklahoma	37

National Final
Ohio State	33
Oregon	46

=== National Invitation Tournament ===
==== Semifinals & finals ====
Semifinals
Bradley	32
Long Island	36
Loyola (Ill.)	51
St. John's	46

Finals
Long Island	44
Loyola (Ill.)	32
Third place
Bradley	40
St. John's	35

== Awards ==
=== Consensus All-American teams ===
Consensus First Team
Player	Class	Team
Ernie Andres	Senior	Indiana
Jimmy Hull	Senior	Ohio State
Chet Jaworski	Senior	Rhode Island State
Irving Torgoff	Senior	Long Island
Slim Wintermute	Senior	Oregon

Consensus Second Team
Player	Class	Team
Bobby Anet	Senior	Oregon
Bob Calihan	Junior	Detroit
Bob Hassmiller	Senior	Fordham
Mike Novak	Senior	Loyola-Chicago
Bernard Opper	Senior	Kentucky

=== Major player of the year awards ===
- Helms Player of the Year: Chet Jaworski, Rhode Island State (retroactive selection in 1944)

=== Other major awards ===
- NIT/Haggerty Award (Top player in New York City metro area): Irv Torgoff, Long Island

== Coaching changes ==
A number of teams changed coaches during the season and after it ended.

Team	Former Coach	Interim Coach	New Coach	Reason
Arizona State—Tempe	Earl Pomeroy		Rudy Lavik	
Army	Leo Novak		Valentine Lentz	
Cincinnati	Rip Van Winkle		Clark Ballard	Van Winkle left to coach Miami (OH).
Colgate	John Galloway		Paul Bixler	
Dayton	Joe Holsinger		James Carter	
Kansas State	Frank Root		Jack Gardner	
Miami (OH)	Weeb Ewbank		Rip Van Winkle	
New Hampshire	George Sauer		Henry Swasey	
New Mexico A&M	Jerry Hines		Julius H. Johnston	
North Carolina	Walter Skidemore		Bill Lange	
Ole Miss	Frank Johnson		Frank Jaskwhich	
Saint Mary's (CA)	Jack Otten		Louis Conlan	
Siena Saints	Jack Carroll		Henry Bunoski	
Temple	James Usilton		Ernest Messikomer	Usilton died during the offseason
Tulsa	Chet Benefiel		H. B. "Tex" Ryon	
UCLA	Caddy Works		Wilbur Johns	
Wyoming	Willard Witte		Everett Shelton	
