= 1939 in basketball =

The following are the basketball events of the year 1939 throughout the world.

== Events ==
- March 22 – Undefeated LIU tops undefeated Loyola of Chicago in the championship game of the second annual National Invitation Tournament, 44–32. LIU's 24–0 final record is the first perfect season of college basketball's postseason tournament era.
- March – The first NCAA tournament is played (operated by the NABC at the time). On March 27, the University of Oregon defeats Ohio State University 46–33 in Evanston, Illinois, to become the inaugural champions of this tournament.
- The third European basketball championship, Eurobasket 1939, is won by Lithuania.
- The seventh South American Basketball Championship in Rio de Janeiro is won by Brazil.
- Israel national basketball team joins the FIBA.

== Tournaments ==
=== College ===
Men

- (United States) NCAA
  - NCAA tournament: Oregon 46, Ohio State 33
    - Most Outstanding Player: Jimmy Hull, Ohio State
  - National Invitation Tournament: Long Island 44, Loyola (IL) 32
- (United States) NAIA
  - NAIA: Southwestern (KS) 32, San Diego State 31

== Births ==
- January 21 — Tom Stith, All-American at St. Bonaventure University (died 2010)
- June 9 — Dick Vitale, College basketball announcer
- July 24 — Walt Bellamy, Hall of Fame center (died 2013)

== Deaths ==
- November 28 — James Naismith, Inventor of basketball (born 1861)
