= 1938–39 Illinois Fighting Illini men's basketball team =

American college basketball season

1938–39 Illinois Fighting Illini men's basketball
- Conference: Big Ten Conference
- Record: 14–5 (8–4 Big Ten)
- Head coach: Douglas Mills (3rd season)
- Assistant coaches: Howie Braun (2nd season); Wally Roettger (4th season)
- Captain: Tom Nisbet
- Home arena: Huff Hall

1938–39 Big Ten Conference men's basketball standings
	Conf.				Overall
Team	W		L	PCT	W		L	PCT
Ohio State	10	–	2	.833	16	–	7	.696
Indiana	9	–	3	.750	17	–	3	.850
Illinois	8	–	4	.667	14	–	5	.737
Minnesota	7	–	5	.583	14	–	6	.700
Purdue	6	–	6	.500	12	–	7	.632
Northwestern	5	–	7	.417	7	–	13	.350
Michigan	4	–	8	.333	11	–	9	.550
Wisconsin	4	–	8	.333	10	–	10	.500
Chicago	4	–	8	.333	9	–	11	.450
Iowa	3	–	9	.250	8	–	11	.421

The 1938–39 Illinois Fighting Illini men's basketball team represented the University of Illinois.

== Regular season ==
The 1938–39 season was year number three for head coach Doug Mills. Overall the team regrouped from a miserable eighth-place finish in the Big Ten a year earlier by winning 9 of their 10 home games only losing to conference rival Indiana. Unfortunately for the Fighting Illini they finished with a 5–5 record on the road to finish in third place overall in conference action. Mills' Illinois Fighting Illini men's basketball team featured only 5 returning letterman. Along with team captain Tom Nisbit, the Illini also featured a starting lineup of Lewis Dehner at the center position, John Drish, Joe Frank and William Hapac at forward and George Wardley, and Colin Handlon at guard.

=== Roster ===
1938–39 Illinois Fighting Illini men's basketball team
Players
Coaches

Pos.	#	Name	Height	Weight	Year	Hometown
G	3	Colin Handlon	—	—	Jr	Connersville, Indiana
G	4	Henry Sachs	—	—	Fr	Chicago, Illinois
C	6	Robert O'Neill	—	—	So	Pitman, New Jersey
C	8	Lewis Dehner	—	—	Sr	Lincoln, Illinois
F	9	Edsel Hart	—	—	So	Kensington, Kansas
G	10	James Phillips	—	—	So	Oak Park, Illinois
G	11	Darold Staley	—	—	So	Decatur, Illinois
G	12	Robert Richmond	—	—	So	Johnston City, Illinois
G	15	George Wardley	—	—	Sr	Gary, Indiana
F	17	Joe Frank	—	—	Jr	Urbana, Illinois
G	18	Tom Nisbet (C)	—	—	Sr	Chicago, Illinois
F	19	William Hapac	—	—	Jr	Cicero, Illinois
G	20	Harold Shapiro	—	—	So	Chicago, Illinois
F	21	John Drish	—	—	So	Evanston, Illinois
F	26	Ivan Johnson	—	—	So	Thebes, Illinois
F	27	Howard Cronk	—	—	So	Anderson, Indiana
F	28	Norman Cusick	—	—	So	Chicago Heights, Illinois

Head coach

- Douglas Mills (University of Illinois) (3rd year)

Assistant coach(es)

- Wally Roettger (University of Illinois) (4th year)
- Howie Braun (University of Illinois) (2nd year)

Legend

- (C) Team captain
- (S) Suspended
- (I) Ineligible
- (W) Walk-on
- Injured
- Current redshirt

Roster

== Schedule ==
Date time, TV	Rank^{#}	Opponent^{#}	Result	Record	Site (attendance) city, state
Non-Conference regular season
12/10/1938*		Washington (St. Louis)	W 49–31	1–0	Huff Hall (5,000); Champaign, IL
12/17/1938*		North Dakota	W 61–33	2–0	Huff Hall (4,000); Champaign, IL
12/21/1938*		Connecticut State	W 49–33	3–0	Huff Hall (4,763); Champaign, IL
12/27/1938*		at Manhattan	W 60–41	4–0	Madison Square Garden (17,000); New York, NY
12/29/1938*		at Villanova	W 28–22	5–0	Municipal Auditorium (9,000); Philadelphia, PA
1/3/1939*		Cornell	W 35–34	6–0	Huff Hall (8,500); Champaign, IL
Big Ten regular season
1/7/1939		Michigan	W 30–20	7–0 (1–0)	Huff Hall (6,553); Champaign, IL
1/9/1939		Indiana; Rivalry	L 28–29	7–1 (1–1)	Huff Hall (6,706); Champaign, IL
1/14/1939		at University of Chicago	W 43–33	8–1 (2–1)	Henry Crown Field House (3,500); Chicago, IL
1/16/1939		Ohio State	W 45–31	9–1 (3–1)	Huff Hall (6,846); Champaign, IL
1/21/1939		at Wisconsin	W 37–34	10–1 (4–1)	Wisconsin Field House (11,200); Madison, WI
1/23/1939		at Minnesota	L 33–35	10–2 (4–2)	Williams Arena (16,500); Minneapolis, MN
2/3/1939*		at Notre Dame	L 24–38	10–3	Notre Dame Fieldhouse (5,500); Notre Dame, IN
2/6/1939		Iowa; Rivalry	W 34–26	11–3 (5–2)	Huff Hall (6,000); Champaign, IL
2/11/1939		at Purdue	L 30–34	11–4 (5–3)	Lambert Fieldhouse (5,000); West Lafayette, IN
2/13/1939		at Michigan	W 35–28	12–4 (6–3)	Yost Field House (4,000); Ann Arbor, MI
2/20/1939		Purdue	W 35–28	13–4 (7–3)	Huff Hall (6,900); Champaign, IL
2/25/1939		at Northwestern; Rivalry	L 34–36	13–5 (7–4)	Patten Gymnasium (5,000); Evanston, IL
2/27/1939		University of Chicago	W 49–26	14–5 (8–4)	Huff Hall (6,500); Champaign, IL
*Non-conference game. ^{#}Rankings from AP Poll. (#) Tournament seedings in parentheses. All times are in Central Time.

== Awards and honors ==
- Louis Dehner
  - Madison Square Garden 1st team All-American
  - Converse 3rd team All-American
