= 1939 NCAA Men's Basketball All-Americans =

- Awarded for: 1938–39 NCAA men's basketball season

The consensus 1939 College Basketball All-American team, as determined by aggregating the results of four major All-American teams. To earn "consensus" status, a player must win honors from a majority of the following teams: the Helms Athletic Foundation, Converse, Collyer's News Bureau, and Madison Square Garden.

== 1939 Consensus All-America team ==
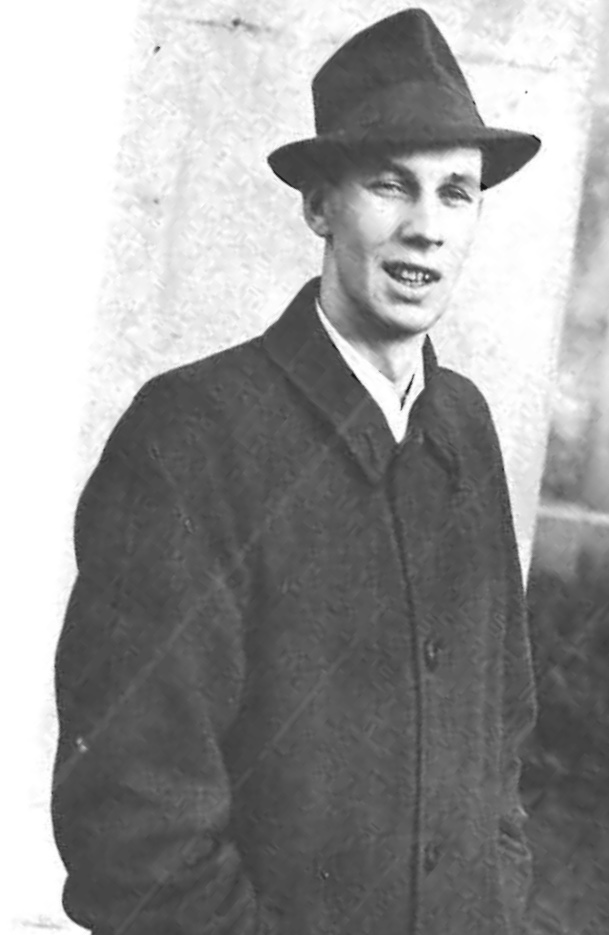
Lauren "Laddie" Gale

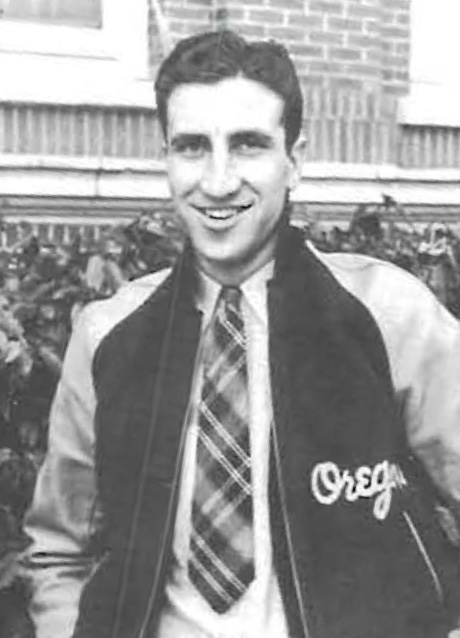
Urgel "Slim" Wintermute

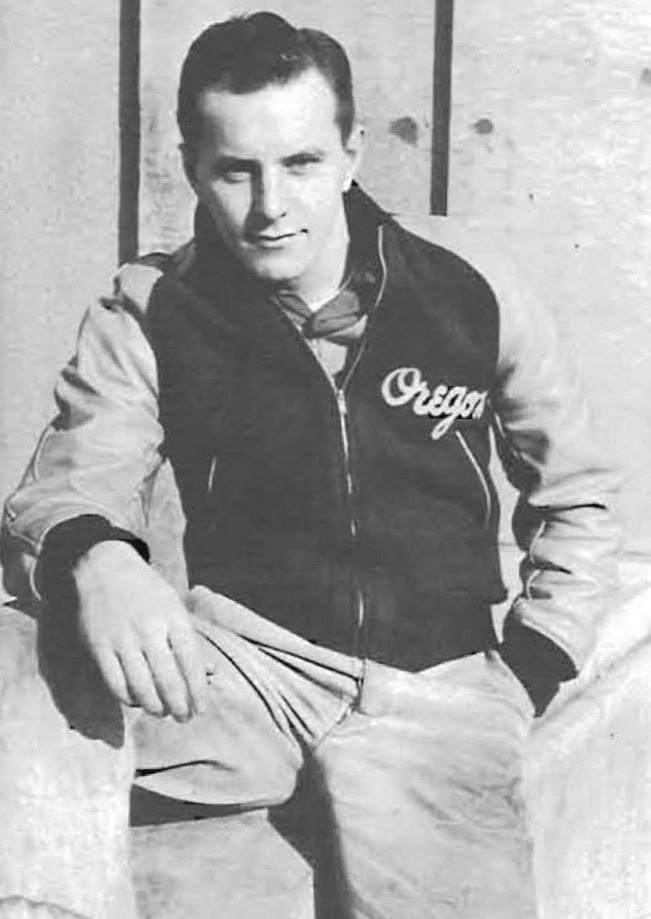
Bobby Anet

The National champion University of Oregon placed three players on All-American teams.

Consensus First Team
Player	Class	Team
Ernie Andres	Senior	Indiana
Jimmy Hull	Senior	Ohio State
Chet Jaworski	Senior	Rhode Island State
Irving Torgoff	Senior	Long Island
Slim Wintermute	Senior	Oregon

Consensus Second Team
Player	Class	Team
Bobby Anet	Senior	Oregon
Bob Calihan	Junior	Detroit
Bob Hassmiller	Senior	Fordham
Mike Novak	Senior	Loyola (IL)
Bernard Opper	Senior	Kentucky

== Individual All-America teams ==
All-America Team
All-America Team	First team		Second team		Third team	
All-America Team	Player	School	Player	School	Player	School
Helms	Ernie Andres	Indiana	No second or third teams			
Helms	Gus Broberg	Dartmouth	No second or third teams			
Helms	Lauren Gale	Oregon	No second or third teams			
Helms	Jimmy Hull	Ohio State	No second or third teams			
Helms	Chet Jaworski	Rhode Island State	No second or third teams			
Helms	John Lobsiger	Missouri	No second or third teams			
Helms	Bobby Moers	Texas	No second or third teams			
Helms	Jesse Renick	Oklahoma A&M	No second or third teams			
Helms	Irving Torgoff	Long Island	No second or third teams			
Helms	Slim Wintermute	Oregon	No second or third teams			
Converse	Bobby Anet	Oregon	Ernie Andres	Indiana	Pick Dehner	Illinois
Converse	Banks McFadden	Clemson	Jimmy Hull	Ohio State	Bob Faris	George Washington
Converse	Bernard Opper	Kentucky	Chet Jaworski	Rhode Island State	Jimmy McNatt	Oklahoma
Converse	Irving Torgoff	Long Island	Wilbert Kautz	Loyola (IL)	Oscar Olson	Carleton
Converse	Slim Wintermute	Oregon	Mike Novak	Loyola (IL)	Dave Quabius	Marquette
Collyer's News Bureau	Bob Calihan	Detroit	Ernie Andres	Indiana	No third team	
Collyer's News Bureau	Bob Hassmiller	Fordham	Chet Jaworski	Rhode Island State	No third team	
Collyer's News Bureau	Jimmy Hull	Ohio State	Wilbert Kautz	Loyola (IL)	No third team	
Collyer's News Bureau	Mike Novak	Loyola (IL)	Ted Panish	Bradley	No third team	
Collyer's News Bureau	Irving Torgoff	Long Island	Ralph Vaughn	Southern California	No third team	
Madison Square Garden	Howard Black	Temple	Chuck Chuckovits	Toledo	No third team	
Madison Square Garden	Pick Dehner	Illinois	Erwin Graf	Marquette	No third team	
Madison Square Garden	Jack Harvey	Colorado	Art Hillhouse	Long Island	No third team	
Madison Square Garden	Bobby Neu	DePaul	Bobby Lewis	NYU	No third team	
Madison Square Garden	Irving Torgoff	Long Island	Stan Szukala	DePaul	No third team	

== See also ==
- 1938–39 NCAA men's basketball season
