= Alexander Severance =

American sports coach (1905–1985)

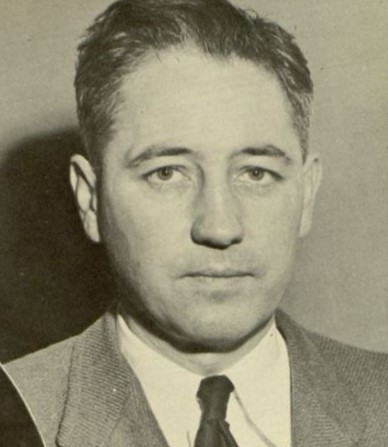
- Severance at Villanova

Biographical details
- Born: June 3, 1905; New York City, New York, U.S.
- Died: April 1, 1985 (aged 79); Lexington, Kentucky, U.S.

Playing career

Basketball
- 1926–1929: Villanova

Coaching career (HC unless noted)

Basketball
- 1936–1961: Villanova

Baseball
- 1944: Villanova

Head coaching record
- Overall: 413–201 (basketball); 4–1 (baseball)
- Tournaments: Basketball; 4–4 (NCAA); 1–2 (NIT)

Alexander G. Severance Sr. (June 3, 1905 – April 1, 1985) was an American basketball and baseball coach. Born in New York City, Severance graduated from Villanova University in 1929 and received his J.D. from Temple University Beasley School of Law in 1932. In addition to coaching basketball for Villanova, Severance was a professor of business law at the university.

Severance coached the Villanova Wildcats men's basketball team for 25 seasons (1936–1961), compiling a 413–201 (.673) record. Among his former players is Naismith Memorial Basketball Hall of Fame member Paul Arizin. Severance coached his team to the first Final Four of the NCAA tournament in 1939. His teams also played in the NCAA Tournament in 1949 and 1955. Under his leadership, Villanova was selected for the National Invitation Tournament (NIT) in 1959 and 1960.

Severance died on the morning of April 1, 1985, in Lexington, Kentucky, on the day Villanova won the 1985 NCAA Division I men's basketball tournament. The championship game was played at Rupp Arena in Lexington.

== Head coaching record ==
=== Basketball ===
Record table
Season	Team	Overall	Conference	Standing	Postseason
Villanova Wildcats (Independent) (1936–1961)
1936–37	Villanova	15–8			
1937–38	Villanova	25–5			
1938–39	Villanova	20–5			NCAA Final Four
1939–40	Villanova	17–2			
1940–41	Villanova	13–3			
1941–42	Villanova	13–9			
1942–43	Villanova	19–2			
1943–44	Villanova	9–11			
1944–45	Villanova	6–11			
1945–46	Villanova	10–13			
1946–47	Villanova	17–7			
1947–48	Villanova	15–9			
1948–49	Villanova	23–4			NCAA Elite Eight
1949–50	Villanova	25–4			
1950–51	Villanova	25–7			NCAA first round
1951–52	Villanova	19–8			
1952–53	Villanova	19–8			
1953–54	Villanova	20–11			
1954–55	Villanova	18–10			NCAA Sweet 16
1955–56	Villanova	14–12			
1956–57	Villanova	10–15			
1957–58	Villanova	12–11			
1958–59	Villanova	18–7			NIT First Round
1959–60	Villanova	20–6			NIT Quarterfinal
1960–61	Villanova	11–13			
Villanova:		413–201 (.673)			
Total:		413–201 (.673)			

== See also ==
- List of NCAA Division I Men's Final Four appearances by coach
