= 1938–39 Georgia Bulldogs basketball team =

American college basketball season

1938–39 Georgia Bulldogs basketball
- Conference: Southeastern Conference
- Record: 11–6 (8–3 SEC)
- Head coach: Elmer A. Lampe (2nd season)
- Captain: Cecil Kelley
- Home arena: Woodruff Hall

1938–39 Southeastern Conference men's basketball standings
| | Conf. | | | | Overall |
| Team | W | | L | PCT | W | | L | PCT |
|---|---|---|---|---|---|---|---|---|
| Alabama | 13 | – | 4 | .765 | 16 | – | 5 | .762 |
| Georgia | 8 | – | 3 | .727 | 11 | – | 6 | .647 |
| Kentucky † | 5 | – | 2 | .714 | 16 | – | 4 | .800 |
| LSU | 10 | – | 5 | .667 | 13 | – | 7 | .650 |
| Auburn | 8 | – | 4 | .667 | 16 | – | 6 | .727 |
| Vanderbilt | 7 | – | 5 | .583 | 14 | – | 7 | .667 |
| Florida | 5 | – | 4 | .556 | 9 | – | 6 | .600 |
| Tennessee | 6 | – | 5 | .545 | 14 | – | 7 | .667 |
| Georgia Tech | 4 | – | 7 | .364 | 6 | – | 9 | .400 |
| Mississippi State | 5 | – | 10 | .333 | 8 | – | 12 | .400 |
| Tulane | 3 | – | 6 | .333 | 5 | – | 13 | .278 |
| Ole Miss | 4 | – | 10 | .286 | 10 | – | 16 | .385 |
| Sewanee | 0 | – | 13 | .000 | 1 | – | 16 | .059 |
† Regular-season championship and SEC Tournament winner

The 1938–39 Georgia Bulldogs basketball team represented the University of Georgia as a member of the Southeastern Conference (SEC) during the 1938–39 NCAA men's basketball season. Led by second-year head coach Elmer A. Lampe, the Bulldogs compiled an overall record of 11–6 with a mark of 8–3 in conference play, placing second in the SEC. The team captain was Cecil Kelley.

== Schedule ==
| Date time, TV | Opponent | Result | Record | Site city, state |
|---|---|---|---|---|
| 1/3/1939 | South Carolina | W 39-24 | 1–0 | Athens, GA |
| 1/7/1939 | Clemson | L 30-37 | 1–1 | Athens, GA |
| 1/13/1939 | at Florida | L 15-26 | 1–2 | |
| 1/14/1939 | at Florida | W 25-18 | 2–2 | |
| 1/20/1939 | Chattanooga | W 66-41 | 3–2 | Athens, GA |
| 1/23/1939 | Alabama | W 31-26 | 4–2 | Athens, GA |
| 1/28/1939 | Georgia Tech | W 32-26 | 5–2 | Athens, GA |
| 1/31/1939 | at South Carolina | W 49-34 | 6–2 | |
| 2/4/1939 | Auburn | W 43-21 | 7–2 | Athens, GA |
| 2/6/1939 | at Clemson | L 29-39 | 7–3 | |
| 2/10/1939 | at Auburn | L 29-34 | 7–4 | |
| 2/14/1939 | Florida | W 42-32 | 8–4 | Athens, GA |
| 2/15/1939 | Florida | W 43-18 | 9–4 | Athens, GA |
| 2/18/1939 | at Georgia Tech | W 41-29 | 10–4 | |
| 2/24/1939 | Sewanee | W 63-48 | 11–4 | Athens, GA |
| 2/25/1939 | at Tennessee | L 29-35 | 11–5 | |
| 3/2/1939 | LSU | L 28-50 | 11–6 | Athens, GA |
*Non-conference game. (#) Tournament seedings in parentheses.
