= 1938–39 Iowa State Cyclones men's basketball team =

American college basketball season

1938–39 Iowa State Cyclones men's basketball
- Conference: Big Six Conference
- Record: 8–9 (5–5 Big Six)
- Head coach: Louis Menze (11th season)
- Home arena: State Gymnasium

1938–39 Big Six Conference men's basketball standings
	Conf.				Overall
Team	W		L	PCT	W		L	PCT
Missouri	7	–	3	.700	12	–	6	.667
Oklahoma	7	–	3	.700	12	–	6	.667
Kansas	6	–	4	.600	13	–	7	.650
Iowa State	5	–	5	.500	8	–	9	.471
Nebraska	3	–	7	.300	7	–	13	.350
Kansas State	2	–	8	.200	5	–	13	.278

The 1938–39 Iowa State Cyclones men's basketball team represented Iowa State University during the 1938–39 NCAA men's basketball season. The Cyclones were coached by Louis Menze, who was in his eleventh season with the Cyclones. They played their home games at the State Gymnasium in Ames, Iowa.

They finished the season 8–9, 5–5 in Big Six play to finish in fourth place.

== Roster ==
1938–39 Iowa State Cyclones men's basketball team
Players
Coaches

Pos.	#	Name	Height	Weight	Year	Hometown
F		Wendell Allan	—	—		Ames, Iowa
F		Don Beresford	—	—	Jr	Ames, Iowa
G		Bill Bliss	—	—		Ames, Iowa
F		Darrell Don Carlos	—	—	So	Perry, Iowa
F		Fred Gordon	—	—	Jr	St. Ansgar, Iowa
F		Bob Harris	—	—	So
G		Chuck Heileman	—	—
C		Ernest Herbertschmeier	6 ft 5 in (1.96 m)	—	So	Hubbard, Iowa
C		Bob Hunt	—	—	So	Marshalltown, Iowa
C		Ed Jones	—	—	So	Conrad, Iowa
G		Bob Menze (C)	5 ft 7 in (1.7 m)	130 lb (59 kg)		Ames, Iowa
C		Gordon Nicholas	—	—	So	Lawton, Iowa
C		Hilary Ryan	—	—		Ames, Iowa
F		Darryl Wagoner	—	—	Sr

Head coach

- Louis Menze

Assistant coach(es)

Legend

- (C) Team captain
- (S) Suspended
- (I) Ineligible
- (W) Walk-on
- Injured
- Current redshirt

== Schedule and results ==
Date time, TV	Rank^{#}	Opponent^{#}	Result	Record	Site city, state
Regular season
December 5, 1938*		Cornell	W 35–25	1–0	State Gymnasium; Ames, Iowa
December 10, 1938*		at Iowa State Teachers (Northern Iowa); Iowa Big Four	L 29–38	1–1	Cedar Falls, Iowa
December 12, 1938*; 7:15 pm		Grinnell	W 43–36	2–1	State Gymnasium; Ames, Iowa
December 17, 1938*; 7:30 pm		Drake; Iowa Big Four	L 30–32	2–2	State Gymnasium; Ames, Iowa
December 31, 1938*		Iowa State Teachers (Northern Iowa); Iowa Big Four	W 43–32	3–2	State Gymnasium; Ames, Iowa
January 7, 1939		Kansas State	W 47–36	4–2 (1–0)	State Gymnasium; Ames, Iowa
January 9, 1939		at Missouri	L 35–56	4–3 (1–1)	Brewer Fieldhouse; Columbia, Missouri
January 16, 1939		Oklahoma	W 51–42	5–3 (2–1)	State Gymnasium; Ames, Iowa
January 18, 1939*; 8:15 pm		at Drake; Iowa Big Four	L 33–35	5–4	Drake Fieldhouse; Des Moines, Iowa
January 23, 1939		Kansas	W 40–37	6–4 (3–1)	State Gymnasium; Ames, Iowa
January 28, 1939*		at Creighton	L 29–35	6–5	Omaha, Nebraska
January 30, 1939		at Nebraska	L 44–51	6–6 (3–2)	Nebraska Coliseum; Lincoln, Nebraska
February 4, 1939		Missouri	W 51–45	7–6 (4–2)	State Gymnasium; Ames, Iowa
February 11, 1939		at Kansas State	L 40–44	7–7 (4–3)	Nichols Hall; Manhattan, Kansas
February 18, 1939		at Oklahoma	L 41–60	7–8 (4–4)	OU Field House; Norman, Oklahoma
February 20, 1939		at Kansas	L 37–46	7–9 (4–5)	Hoch Auditorium; Lawrence, Kansas
February 27, 1939		Nebraska	W 41–28	8–9 (5–5)	State Gymnasium; Ames, Iowa
*Non-conference game. ^{#}Rankings from AP poll. (#) Tournament seedings in parentheses. All times are in Central Time.
