= 1938–39 Oklahoma Sooners men's basketball team =

American college basketball season

1938–39 Oklahoma Sooners men's basketball

Big Six Conference co-champion

NCAA tournament, Final Four
- Conference: Big Six Conference
- Record: 12–9 (7–3 Big Six)
- Head coach: Bruce Drake (1st season)
- Home arena: McCasland Field House

1938–39 Big Six Conference men's basketball standings
	Conf.				Overall
Team	W		L	PCT	W		L	PCT
Missouri	7	–	3	.700	12	–	6	.667
Oklahoma	7	–	3	.700	12	–	6	.667
Kansas	6	–	4	.600	13	–	7	.650
Iowa State	5	–	5	.500	8	–	9	.471
Nebraska	3	–	7	.300	7	–	13	.350
Kansas State	2	–	8	.200	5	–	13	.278

The 1938–39 Oklahoma Sooners men's basketball team represented the University of Oklahoma in the 1938–39 NCAA men's basketball season as a member of the Big Six Conference. They finished the season with a 12–9 overall record, and tied for the Big Six Conference title with a 7–3 conference record. The Sooners made it to the Final Four of the 1939 NCAA basketball tournament. They were coached by Bruce Drake in his first season as head coach of the Sooners. They played their home games at McCasland Field House in Norman, Oklahoma.

== Schedule ==
Date time, TV	Rank^{#}	Opponent^{#}	Result	Record	Site city, state
Regular season
December 16, 1938*		at Colorado	L 42–52	0–1	Balch Fieldhouse; Boulder, CO
December 17, 1938*		at Colorado	W 33–29	1–1	Balch Fieldhouse; Boulder, CO
December 20, 1938*		Arkansas	L 31–39	1–2	McCasland Field House; Norman, OK
December 21, 1938*		Arkansas	L 30–36	1–3	McCasland Field House; Norman, OK
*		at SMU	L 44–49	1–4	Old Gym; University Park, TX
*		SMU	W 49–31	2–4	Old Gym; University Park, TX
January 7, 1939		Kansas	W 43–31	3–4 (1–0)	McCasland Field House; Norman, OK
January 14, 1939		at Missouri	L 33–37 ^{OT}	3–5 (1–1)	Brewer Fieldhouse; Columbia, MO
January 16, 1939		at Iowa State	L 42–51	3–6 (1–2)	State Gymnasium; Ames, IA
January 28, 1939		Nebraska	W 56–39	4–6 (2–2)	McCasland Field House; Norman, OK
February 2, 1939*		Oklahoma A&M; Bedlam Series	W 34–30	5–6	McCasland Field House; Norman, OK
February 4, 1939		Kansas State	W 37–35 ^{OT}	6–6 (3–2)	McCasland Field House; Norman, OK
February 10, 1939		at Kansas State	W 50–38	7–6 (4–2)	Ahearn Field House; Manhattan, KS
February 11, 1939		Missouri	W 43–40	8–6 (5–2)	McCasland Field House; Norman, OK
February 16, 1939*		at Oklahoma A&M; Bedlam Series	L 22–32	8–7	4-H Club and Student Activities Building; Stillwater, OK
February 18, 1939		Iowa State	W 60–41	9–8 (6–2)	McCasland Field House; Norman, OK
February 27, 1939		at Kansas	L 45–59	10–8 (6–3)	Hoch Auditorium; Lawrence, KS
March 4, 1939		at Nebraska	W 53–47	11–8 (7–3)	Nebraska Coliseum; Lincoln, NE
March 14, 1939*		vs. Oklahoma A&M; Bedlam Series/District Final	W 30–21	11–8	Oklahoma City, OK
NCAA tournament
March 20, 1939		vs. Utah State; Quarterfinal	W 50–39	12–8	California Coliseum; San Francisco, CA
March 21, 1939		vs. Oregon; Final Four	L 37–55	12–9	California Coliseum; San Francisco, CA
*Non-conference game. ^{#}Rankings from AP Poll. (#) Tournament seedings in parentheses. All times are in Central Time.
