= 1938–39 Kansas Jayhawks men's basketball team =

American college basketball season

1938–39 Kansas Jayhawks men's basketball
- Conference: Big Six Conference
- Record: 13–7 (6–4 Big 6)
- Head coach: Phog Allen (22nd season)
- Captain: Lyman Corlis
- Home arena: Hoch Auditorium

1938–39 Big Six Conference men's basketball standings
	Conf.				Overall
Team	W		L	PCT	W		L	PCT
Missouri	7	–	3	.700	12	–	6	.667
Oklahoma	7	–	3	.700	12	–	6	.667
Kansas	6	–	4	.600	13	–	7	.650
Iowa State	5	–	5	.500	8	–	9	.471
Nebraska	3	–	7	.300	7	–	13	.350
Kansas State	2	–	8	.200	5	–	13	.278

The 1938–39 Kansas Jayhawks men's basketball team represented the University of Kansas during the 1938–39 college men's basketball season. The Jayhawks were coached by Phog Allen. On January 18, 1939, the Jayhawks notched their 500th program victory by defeating rival Missouri Tigers at Home. Kansas failed to qualify for the 1939 NCAA Tournament, which was the first tournament ever held.

== Roster ==
- Robert Allen
- Lyman Corlis
- Ralph Dugan
- Donald Ebling
- Howard Engleman
- Loren Florell
- Richard Harp
- Lester Kappelman
- John Kline
- Ralph Miller
- Charles Nees
- Max Replogle
- Jack Sands

== Schedule ==
Date time, TV	Rank^{#}	Opponent^{#}	Result	Record	Site city, state
December 3*		Warrensburg	W 25–20	1-0	Hoch Auditorium; Lawrence, KS
December 9*		at Oklahoma A&M	L 15–21	1-1	Gallagher-Iba Arena; Stillwater, OK
December 10*		at Oklahoma A&M	L 19–25	1-2	Gallagher-Iba Arena; Stillwater, OK
December 16*		at Texas	L 34–36	1-3	Gregory Gymnasium; Austin, TX
December 17*		at Texas	W 49–35	2-3	Gregory Gymnasium; Austin, TX
December 19*		at SMU	W 46–40	3-3	Old Gym; Dallas, TX
December 20*		at SMU	W 52–45	4-3	Old Gym; Dallas, TX
January 2*		Carleton	W 39–33	5-3	Hoch Auditorium; Lawrence, KS
January 7		at Oklahoma	L 31–43	5-4 (0-1)	Field House; Norman, OK
January 10		Kansas State; Sunflower Showdown	W 33–29	6-4 (1-1)	Hoch Auditorium; Lawrence, KS
January 14		at Nebraska	L 37–48	6-5 (1-2)	Nebraska Coliseum; Lincoln, NE
January 18		Missouri; Border War	W 37–32	7-5 (2-2)	Hoch Auditorium; Lawrence, KS
January 23		at Iowa State	L 37–40	7-6 (2-3)	State Gymnasium; Ames, IA
January 28		at Kansas State; Sunflower Showdown	W 40–38	8-6 (3-3)	Nichols Hall; Manhattan, KS
February 8*		Oklahoma A&M	W 34–27	9-6	Hoch Auditorium; Lawrence, KS
February 10*		at Washburn	W 37–34	10-6	Topeka High School; Topeka, KS
February 14		Nebraska	W 49–46	11-6 (4-3)	Hoch Auditorium; Lawrence, KS
February 20		Iowa State	W 46–37	12-6 (5-3)	Hoch Auditorium; Lawrence, KS
February 25		Oklahoma	W 59–45	13-6 (6-3)	Hoch Auditorium; Lawrence, KS
March 2		at Missouri; Border War	L 30–55	13-7 (6-4)	Brewer Fieldhouse; Columbia, MO
*Non-conference game. ^{#}Rankings from AP Poll. (#) Tournament seedings in parentheses.
