= 1938–39 UCLA Bruins men's basketball team =

American college basketball season

1938–39 UCLA Bruins men's basketball
- Conference: Pacific Coast Conference
- South
- Record: 7–20 (0–12 PCC)
- Head coach: Caddy Works (18th season)
- Assistant coaches: Wilbur Johns; Dick Linthicum

1938–39 Pacific Coast Conference men's basketball standings
	Conf.				Overall
Team	W		L	PCT	W		L	PCT
North
Oregon †	14	–	2	.875	29	–	5	.853
Washington	11	–	5	.688	20	–	5	.800
Washington State	8	–	8	.500	23	–	10	.697
Oregon State	6	–	10	.375	13	–	11	.542
Idaho	1	–	15	.063	12	–	19	.387
South
California	9	–	3	.750	24	–	8	.750
USC	9	–	3	.750	20	–	5	.800
Stanford	6	–	6	.500	16	–	9	.640
UCLA	0	–	12	.000	7	–	20	.259
† Conference playoff series winner

The 1938–39 UCLA Bruins men's basketball team represented the University of California, Los Angeles during the 1938–39 NCAA men's basketball season and were members of the Pacific Coast Conference. The Bruins were led by 18th year head coach Caddy Works. They finished the regular season with a record of 7–20 and were fourth in the southern division with a record of 0–12.

== Previous season ==
The Bruins finished the regular season with a record of 4–20 and were fourth in the southern division with a record of 0–12.

== Roster ==
1938–39 UCLA Bruins men's basketball team
Players
Coaches

Pos.	#	Name	Height	Weight	Year	Hometown
F	24	Lloyd Anderson	—	—
G	32	Don Brown	—	—
	27	Robert Calkins	—	—
F	34	Crossan Hays (C)	—	—	Sr
C	30	Luther Hiltner	—	—
F	23	Harley Humes	—	—
F	38	Paul Klein	—	—
G	37	Jack Montgomery	—	—
C	22	Wilburn Munkers	—	—
G	39	Robert Null	—	—
G	28	Stanley Price	—	—
G	21	Alex Rafalovich	—	—
F	25	Gerald Sieck	—	—
F	40	Ray Weldie	—	—

Head coach

Caddy Works

Assistant coach(es)

- Dick Linthicum (UCLA)
- Wilbur Johns (UCLA)

Legend

- (C) Team captain
- (S) Suspended
- (I) Ineligible
- (W) Walk-on
- Injured
- Current redshirt

Roster
Last update: 30 January 2018

== Schedule ==
Date time, TV	Rank^{#}	Opponent^{#}	Result	Record	Site city, state
Regular Season
*		Los Angeles City College	W 44–28	1–0	Men's Gym; Los Angeles, CA
*		Pomona	W 51–34	2–0	Men's Gym; Los Angeles, CA
*		La Verne	W 76–19	3–0	Men's Gym; Los Angeles, CA
*		at San Diego State	L 49–52	3–1	San Diego, CA
*		at San Diego State	L 43–56	3–2	San Diego, CA
		Idaho	L 29–36	3–3	Men's Gym; Los Angeles, CA
*		Tulane	L 35–37	3–4	Men's Gym; Los Angeles, CA
*		Long Beach Junior College	W 55–27	4–4	Men's Gym; Los Angeles, CA
*		Los Angeles City College	W 47–41	5–4	Men's Gym; Los Angeles, CA
*		at Ohio State	L 38–46	5–5	Men's Gym; Berkeley, CA
*		at Nebraska	L 30–35	5–6	Men's Gym; Berkeley, CA
*		Ohio State	L 57–59	5–7	Men's Gym; Los Angeles, CA
*		Nebraska	W 42–40	6–7	Men's Gym; Los Angeles, CA
*		at Occidental	W 46–34	7–7	Los Angeles, CA
		California	L 39–54	7–8 (0–1)	Men's Gym; Los Angeles, CA
		California	L 33–49	7–9 (0–2)	Men's Gym; Los Angeles, CA
		USC	L 36–69	7–10 (0–3)	Men's Gym; Los Angeles, CA
*		at Pomona	L 35–43	7–11	Claremont, CA
		at Stanford	L 44–56	7–12 (0–4)	Stanford Pavilion; Stanford, CA
		at Stanford	L 21–47	7–13 (0–5)	Stanford Pavilion; Stanford, CA
		USC	L 49–59	7–14 (0–6)	Men's Gym; Los Angeles, CA
		at California	L 32–54	7–15 (0–7)	Men's Gym; Berkeley, CA
		at California	L 22–42	7–16 (0–8)	Men's Gym; Berkeley, CA
		Stanford	L 32–38	7–17 (0–9)	Men's Gym; Los Angeles, CA
		Stanford	L 33–37	7–18 (0–10)	Men's Gym; Los Angeles, CA
		USC	L 35–43	7–19 (0–11)	Men's Gym; Los Angeles, CA
		USC	L 26–57	7–20 (0–12)	Men's Gym; Los Angeles, CA
*Non-conference game. ^{#}Rankings from AP Poll. (#) Tournament seedings in parentheses. All times are in Pacific Time.
