= 1938–39 Ohio State Buckeyes men's basketball team =

American college basketball season

1938–39 Ohio State Buckeyes men's basketball
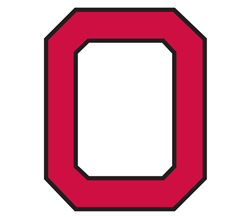

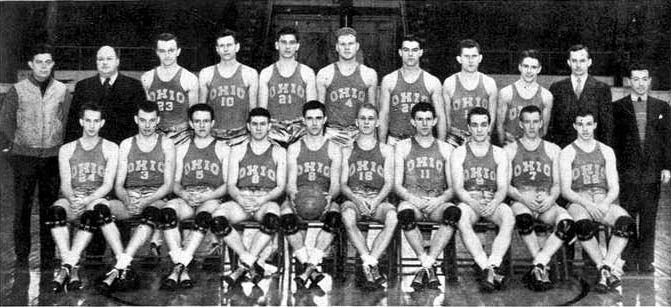

NCAA tournament, Runner-up Big Ten Champions

National Championship Game, L 33–46 vs. Oregon
- Conference: Big Ten Conference
- Record: 16–7 (10–2 Big Ten)
- Head coach: Harold Olsen (17th season)
- Assistant coach: J. E. Blickle
- Home arena: Fairgrounds Coliseum

1938–39 Big Ten Conference men's basketball standings
	Conf.				Overall
Team	W		L	PCT	W		L	PCT
Ohio State	10	–	2	.833	16	–	7	.696
Indiana	9	–	3	.750	17	–	3	.850
Illinois	8	–	4	.667	14	–	5	.737
Minnesota	7	–	5	.583	14	–	6	.700
Purdue	6	–	6	.500	12	–	7	.632
Northwestern	5	–	7	.417	7	–	13	.350
Michigan	4	–	8	.333	11	–	9	.550
Wisconsin	4	–	8	.333	10	–	10	.500
Chicago	4	–	8	.333	9	–	11	.450
Iowa	3	–	9	.250	8	–	11	.421

The 1938–39 Ohio State Buckeyes men's basketball team represented Ohio State University as a member of the Big Ten Conference during the 1938–39 NCAA men's basketball season. The team's head coach was Harold Olsen and they played their home games at the Fairgrounds Coliseum. Ohio State finished Big Ten play atop the standings with a 10–2 record. The Buckeyes were one of eight teams selected to play in the inaugural NCAA tournament where they finished runner-up after losing to Oregon in the championship game.

== Roster ==
1938–39 Ohio State Buckeyes men's basketball team
Players
Coaches

Pos.	#	Name	Height	Weight	Year	Hometown
C	3	Bill Sattler	6 ft 6.5 in (1.99 m)	188 lb (85 kg)	Jr	Mineral City, Ohio
C	4	Charles Maag	6 ft 4 in (1.93 m)	210 lb (95 kg)	So	Sandusky, Ohio
G	5	Bob Lynch	6 ft 0 in (1.83 m)	176 lb (80 kg)	Jr	Hillsboro, Ohio
F	6	Dick Baker	5 ft 11 in (1.8 m)	168 lb (76 kg)	Sr	Anderson, Indiana
F	7	Gil Mickelson	6 ft 1 in (1.85 m)	165 lb (75 kg)	So	Thief River Falls, Minnesota
F	8	Jimmy Hull (C)	5 ft 11 in (1.8 m)	178 lb (81 kg)	Sr	Greenfield, Ohio
G	9	Jack Dawson	5 ft 10 in (1.78 m)	160 lb (73 kg)	So	Indianapolis, Indiana
C	11	John Schick	6 ft 3.75 in (1.92 m)	185 lb (84 kg)	Jr	Columbus, Ohio
G	16	Dick Boughner	6 ft 0 in (1.83 m)	180 lb (82 kg)	Sr	Akron, Ohio
G	20	Don Scott	6 ft 2 in (1.88 m)	215 lb (98 kg)	So	Canton, Ohio
G	22	Jed Mees	6 ft 0 in (1.83 m)	175 lb (79 kg)	So	Pomeroy, Ohio
F	24	Robert Stafford	6 ft 2 in (1.88 m)	185 lb (84 kg)	Jr	Crawfordsville, Indiana

Head coach

- Harold Olsen (Wisconsin)

Assistant coach(es)

Legend

- (C) Team captain
- (S) Suspended
- (I) Ineligible
- (W) Walk-on
- Injured
- Current redshirt

== Schedule and results ==
Date time, TV	Rank^{#}	Opponent^{#}	Result	Record	Site city, state
Regular season
Dec 10, 1938*		George Washington	W 43–37	1–0	Fairgrounds Coliseum; Columbus, Ohio
Dec 22, 1938*		at Washington	L 41–43	1–1	UW Pavilion; Seattle, Washington
Dec 23, 1938*		at Washington	L 37–51	1–2	UW Pavilion; Seattle, Washington
Dec 26, 1938*		at UCLA	W 46–38	2–2	Los Angeles, California
Dec 30, 1938*		vs. UCLA	W 59–57	3–3	Men's Gym; Berkeley, California
Dec 30, 1938*		California	L 42–45	3–4	Men's Gym; Berkeley, California
Jan 7, 1939		Indiana	W 45–38	4–4 (1–0)	Fairgrounds Coliseum; Columbus, Ohio
Jan 14, 1939		at Northwestern	W 38–33	5–4 (2–0)	Patten Gymnasium; Evanston, Illinois
Jan 16, 1939		at Illinois	L 31–45	5–5 (2–1)	Huff Hall (6,846); Champaign, Illinois
Jan 21, 1939*		at Army	W 48–39	6–5	Gillis Field House; West Point, New York
Jan 23, 1939		Michigan; Rivalry	W 45–31	7–5 (3–1)	Fairgrounds Coliseum; Columbus, Ohio
Jan 28, 1939		Chicago	W 52–25	8–5 (4–1)	Fairgrounds Coliseum; Columbus, Ohio
Feb 4, 1939		at Minnesota	W 31–30 ^{OT}	9–5 (5–1)	Williams Arena; Minneapolis, Minnesota
Feb 6, 1939		at Indiana	L 34–46	9–6 (5–2)	The Fieldhouse; Bloomington, Indiana
Feb 18, 1939		Iowa	W 53–40	10–6 (6–2)	Fairgrounds Coliseum; Columbus, Ohio
Feb 20, 1939		Northwestern	W 30–26	11–6 (7–2)	Fairgrounds Coliseum; Columbus, Ohio
Feb 25, 1939		at Wisconsin	W 46–38	12–6 (8–2)	UW Field House; Madison, Wisconsin
Feb 27, 1939		at Michigan; Rivalry	W 42–28	13–6 (9–2)	Yost Field House; Ann Arbor, Michigan
Mar 4, 1939		Purdue	W 51–35	14–6 (10–2)	Fairgrounds Coliseum; Columbus, Ohio
NCAA tournament
Mar 17, 1939*		vs. Wake Forest; National Quarterfinal – Elite Eight	W 64–52	15–6	Palestra; Philadelphia, Pennsylvania
Mar 18, 1939*		vs. Villanova; National Semifinal – Final Four	W 53–36	16–6	Palestra; Philadelphia, Pennsylvania
Mar 27, 1939*		vs. Oregon; National championship game	L 33–46	16–7	Patten Gymnasium; Evanston, Illinois
*Non-conference game. ^{#}Rankings from AP Poll. (#) Tournament seedings in parentheses. E=East.
