= Red Dugan =

American college baseball coach (1913–1992)

Biographical details
- Born: February 13, 1913; Frankfort, Kansas, U.S.
- Died: July 5, 1992 (aged 79); Hiawatha, Kansas, U.S.
- Education: University of Kansas

Playing career
- 1938–1940: Kansas
- Position: Pitcher

Coaching career (HC unless noted)
- 1946: Kansas

Head coaching record
- Overall: 4–6

Ralph Newton "Red" Dugan (February 13, 1913 – July 5, 1992) was an American college athlete, and head coach of the Kansas Jayhawks baseball team in 1946.

== Biography ==
Dugan was born in Frankfort, Kansas, in 1913. He attended Holton High School in Holton, Kansas, and then attended the University of Kansas, initially on a football scholarship. At Kansas, he played football (1938), basketball (1938), and baseball (1938–1940). He earned varsity letters in baseball as a pitcher.

During World War II, Dugan served in the United States Army Air Corps, from January 1943 to January 1946. He was first stationed in Miami Beach, Florida, where he played football and baseball. He was then transferred to Las Vegas Army Air Field, where he coached the air field's baseball team, the Horned Frogs. They competed against other military teams, and also won some semi-professional tournaments.

While in the military, Dugan had surgery to remove warts on his feet; this led to an infection, and caused him to walk with a limp for the rest of his life.

After the war, Dugan returned to the University of Kansas, where he served as head coach of the baseball team in 1946. The team had a record of 4–6, playing all of their games within the Big Six Conference, and finishing in fifth place in the conference. Dugan earned a degree in physical education and became a teacher. He later worked in Hiawatha, Kansas, for 30 years as a coach and teacher. He also served in the Kansas National Guard until 1968.

Dugan died in Hiawatha in 1992. He was a widower, and was survived by a daughter.
