= 1938–39 Indiana Hoosiers men's basketball team =

American college basketball season

1938–39 Indiana Hoosiers men's basketball
- Conference: Big Ten Conference
- Record: 17–3 (9–3 Big Ten)
- Head coach: Branch McCracken (1st season)
- Captain: Ernie Andres
- Home arena: The Fieldhouse

1938–39 Big Ten Conference men's basketball standings
	Conf.				Overall
Team	W		L	PCT	W		L	PCT
Ohio State	10	–	2	.833	16	–	7	.696
Indiana	9	–	3	.750	17	–	3	.850
Illinois	8	–	4	.667	14	–	5	.737
Minnesota	7	–	5	.583	14	–	6	.700
Purdue	6	–	6	.500	12	–	7	.632
Northwestern	5	–	7	.417	7	–	13	.350
Michigan	4	–	8	.333	11	–	9	.550
Wisconsin	4	–	8	.333	10	–	10	.500
Chicago	4	–	8	.333	9	–	11	.450
Iowa	3	–	9	.250	8	–	11	.421

The 1938–39 Indiana Hoosiers men's basketball team represented Indiana University. Their head coach was Branch McCracken, who was in his 1st year. The team played its home games in The Fieldhouse in Bloomington, Indiana, and was a member of the Big Ten Conference.

The Hoosiers finished the regular season with an overall record of 17–3 and a conference record of 9–3, finishing 2nd in the Big Ten Conference. Indiana was not invited to participate in any postseason tournament.

== Roster ==
No.	Name	Position	Ht.	Year	Hometown
4	Gordon McLaughlin	F	6–1	So.	Terre Haute, Indiana
7	Edgar Mansfield	G	5–11	So.	LaPorte, Indiana
8	Richard McGaughey	G	5–11	So.	Crawfordsville, Indiana
9	Chet Francis	G	6–1	So.	Avon, Indiana
10	Bill Tipmore	C	6–2	So.	Elkhart, Indiana
11	Robert Hansen	C	6–3	So.	Chicago
12	Jim Gridley	G	6–1	So.	Vevay, Indiana
13	Jim Ooley	G	6–2	Jr.	Spencer, Indiana
16	Russell Clifton	C	6–3	So.	Bentonville, Indiana
18	Jim Lettellier	F	5–10	So.	Bloomington, Indiana
19	Dale Gentil	F	6–2	Jr.	Mount Vernon, Indiana
20	Jack Stevenson	F	6–1	Jr.	Indianapolis, Indiana
21	Bob Dro	G	5–11	So.	Berne, Indiana
22	Curly Armstrong	F	5–11	So.	Fort Wayne, Indiana
23	William Menke	C	6–3	So.	Huntingburg, Indiana
24	William Johnson	F/G	6–1	Sr.	Jeffersonville, Indiana
24	Herm Schaefer	F	6–1	So.	Fort Wayne, Indiana
25	Ernie Andres	G	6–1	Sr.	Jeffersonville, Indiana
26	Tom Motter	F	6–1	So.	Fort Wayne, Indiana
28	Marv Huffman	G	6–2	Jr.	New Castle, Indiana
29	Robert Menke	F	6–3	So.	Huntingburg, Indiana
30	Ralph Dorsey	F	5–10	Jr.	Horse Cave, Kentucky

== Schedule/results ==
Date time, TV	Rank^{#}	Opponent^{#}	Result	Record	Site city, state
Regular season
12/5/1938*		Ball State	W 54–28	1–0	The Fieldhouse; Bloomington, Indiana
12/10/1938*		Miami (OH)	W 49–23	2–0	The Fieldhouse; Bloomington, Indiana
12/12/1938*		Wabash	W 47–23	3–0	The Fieldhouse; Bloomington, Indiana
12/17/1938*		Connecticut	W 71–38	4–0	The Fieldhouse; Bloomington, Indiana
12/23/1938*		at Butler	W 46–29	5–0	Butler Fieldhouse; Indianapolis
12/30/1938*		at Western Reserve	W 45–33	6–0	Cleveland, Ohio
12/31/1938*		at Michigan State	W 37–33	7–0	Demonstration Hall; East Lansing, Michigan
1/7/1939		at Ohio State	L 38–45	7–1 (0–1)	Ohio Expo Center Coliseum; Columbus, Ohio
1/9/1939		at Illinois; Rivalry	W 29–28	8–1 (1–1)	Huff Hall; Champaign, Illinois
1/14/1939		Wisconsin	W 43–19	9–1 (2–1)	The Fieldhouse; Bloomington, Indiana
1/16/1939		Purdue; Rivalry	W 39–36	10–1 (3–1)	The Fieldhouse; Bloomington, Indiana
2/3/1939*		at Xavier	W 48–39	11–1 (3–1)	Schmidt Field House; Cincinnati
2/6/1939		Ohio State	W 46–34	12–1 (4–1)	The Fieldhouse; Bloomington, Indiana
2/11/1939		at Iowa	W 50–39	13–1 (5–1)	Iowa Field House; Iowa City, IA
2/13/1939		at Chicago	W 46–33	14–1 (6–1)	Henry Crown Field House; Chicago
2/18/1939		Northwestern	W 44–37	15–1 (7–1)	The Fieldhouse; Bloomington, Indiana
2/20/1939		Iowa	W 45–40	16–1 (8–1)	The Fieldhouse; Bloomington, Indiana
2/25/1939		Minnesota	W 49–37	17–1 (9–1)	The Fieldhouse; Bloomington, Indiana
2/27/1939		at Purdue; Rivalry	L 34–45	17–2 (9–2)	Lambert Fieldhouse; West Lafayette, Indiana
3/4/1939		at Michigan	L 45–53	17–3 (9–3)	Yost Field House; Ann Arbor, Michigan
*Non-conference game. ^{#}Rankings from AP Poll. (#) Tournament seedings in parentheses.
