= 1938–39 Washington State Cougars men's basketball team =

American college basketball season

1938–39 Washington State Cougars men's basketball
- Conference: Pacific Coast Conference
- Record: 23–10 (8–8 PCC)
- Head coach: Jack Friel (11th season)
- Home arena: WSC Gymnasium

1938–39 Pacific Coast Conference men's basketball standings
	Conf.				Overall
Team	W		L	PCT	W		L	PCT
North
Oregon †	14	–	2	.875	29	–	5	.853
Washington	11	–	5	.688	20	–	5	.800
Washington State	8	–	8	.500	23	–	10	.697
Oregon State	6	–	10	.375	13	–	11	.542
Idaho	1	–	15	.063	12	–	19	.387
South
California	9	–	3	.750	24	–	8	.750
USC	9	–	3	.750	20	–	5	.800
Stanford	6	–	6	.500	16	–	9	.640
UCLA	0	–	12	.000	7	–	20	.259
† Conference playoff series winner

The 1938–39 Washington State Cougars men's basketball team represented Washington State College for the 1938–39 college basketball season. Led by eleventh-year head coach Jack Friel, the Cougars were members of the Pacific Coast Conference and played their home games on campus at WSC Gymnasium in Pullman, Washington.

The Cougars were 23–10 overall in the regular season and 8–8 in conference play, third place in Northern division.
