= Chet Jaworski =

American basketball player (1916–2003)

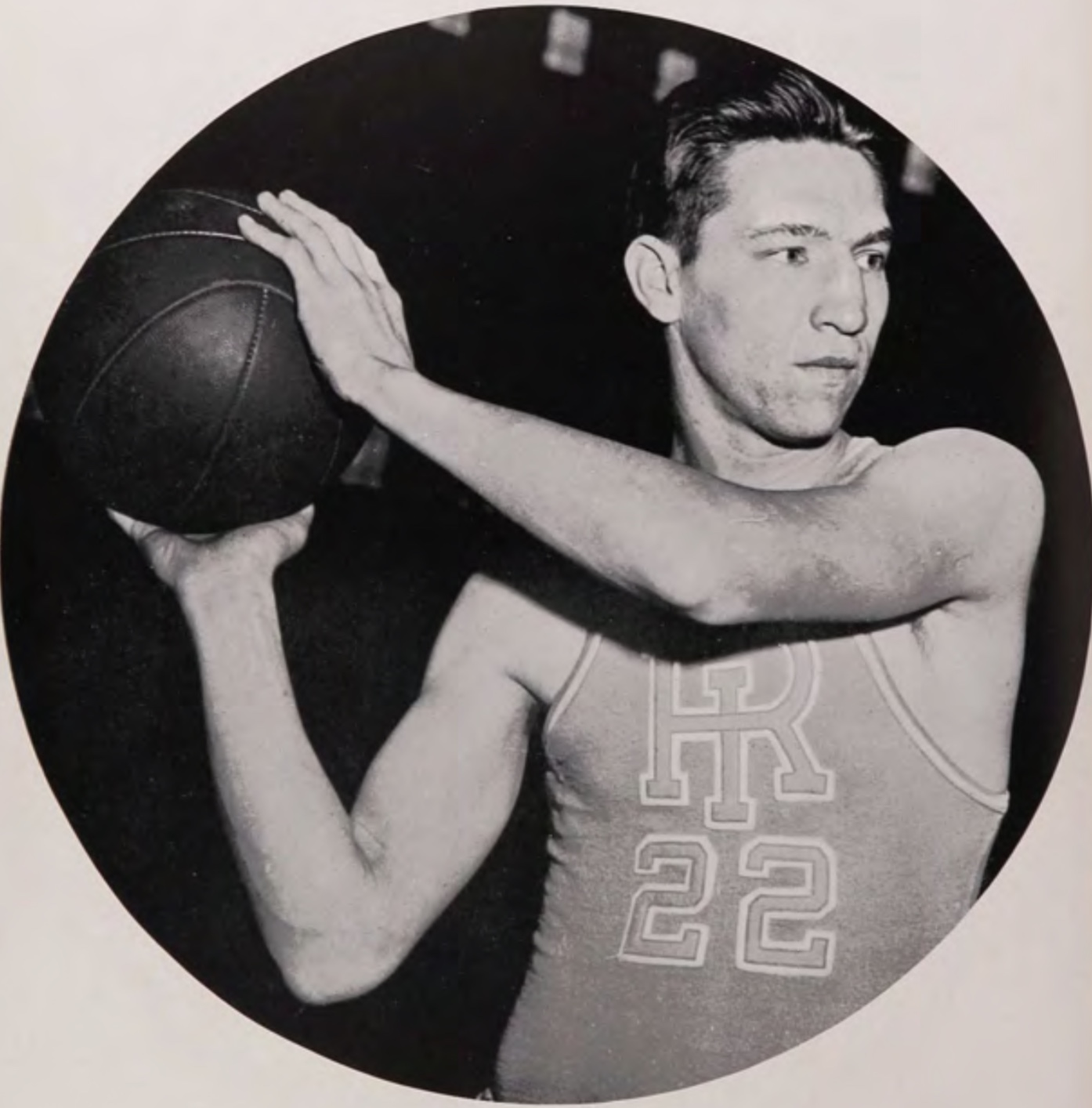
- Jaworski with the Rhode Island Rams during the 1938–39 season

Personal information
- Born: November 8, 1916 Worcester, Massachusetts, U.S.
- Died: October 16, 2003 (aged 86)
- Listed height: 5 ft 10 in (1.78 m)
- Listed weight: 165 lb (75 kg)

Career information
- High school: Commerce (Worcester, Massachusetts)
- College: Rhode Island (1935–1939)
- Position: Forward

Career highlights
- Helms Foundation Player of the Year (1939); Consensus first-team All-American (1939); 2× NCAA scoring champion (1938, 1939)

Chester Stanley Jaworski (November 8, 1916 – October 16, 2003) was an American basketball player. He was the University of Rhode Island (URI)'s first All-American selection in men's basketball. As a senior in 1938–39, he led the nation in scoring at 22.9 points per game and was named the Helms Foundation College Basketball Player of the Year as well as a Consensus NCAA First Team All-American. He scored a career-high 44 points in December 1938. Jaworski played the forward position in basketball, but he also earned three varsity letters for the school's baseball team and one letter for the football team. For his achievements, Jaworski was enshrined into both the URI and New England Basketball Halls of Fame. He was a member of the Bristol Tramps champions of the 1946–47 Eastern Basketball League – Connecticut
