= 1939 SEC men's basketball tournament =

- Classification: Division I
- Teams: 12
- Site: Alumni Memorial Gym; Knoxville, Tennessee
- Champions: Kentucky (3rd title)
- Winning coach: Adolph Rupp (3rd title)

1938–39 Southeastern Conference men's basketball standings
| | Conf. | | | | Overall |
| Team | W | | L | PCT | W | | L | PCT |
|---|---|---|---|---|---|---|---|---|
| Alabama | 13 | – | 4 | .765 | 16 | – | 5 | .762 |
| Georgia | 8 | – | 3 | .727 | 11 | – | 6 | .647 |
| Kentucky † | 5 | – | 2 | .714 | 16 | – | 4 | .800 |
| LSU | 10 | – | 5 | .667 | 13 | – | 7 | .650 |
| Auburn | 8 | – | 4 | .667 | 16 | – | 6 | .727 |
| Vanderbilt | 7 | – | 5 | .583 | 14 | – | 7 | .667 |
| Florida | 5 | – | 4 | .556 | 9 | – | 6 | .600 |
| Tennessee | 6 | – | 5 | .545 | 14 | – | 7 | .667 |
| Georgia Tech | 4 | – | 7 | .364 | 6 | – | 9 | .400 |
| Mississippi State | 5 | – | 10 | .333 | 8 | – | 12 | .400 |
| Tulane | 3 | – | 6 | .333 | 5 | – | 13 | .278 |
| Ole Miss | 4 | – | 10 | .286 | 10 | – | 16 | .385 |
| Sewanee | 0 | – | 13 | .000 | 1 | – | 16 | .059 |
† Regular-season championship and SEC Tournament winner

The 1939 Southeastern Conference men's basketball tournament took place on March 1–4, 1939, in Knoxville, Tennessee at Alumni Memorial Gym. It was the sixth SEC basketball tournament.

Kentucky won the tournament by beating Tennessee in the championship game.

== Bracket ==
First Round
Vanderbilt | 73
Mississippi State | 40
Auburn | 43
Tulane | 30
Ole Miss | 42
Georgia Tech | 38
LSU | 55
Sewanee | 35

Quarterfinals
Alabama | 35
Vanderbilt | 41
Tennessee | 49
Auburn | 35
Kentucky | 49
Ole Miss | 30
Georgia | 28
LSU | 50

Semifinals
Vanderbilt | 36
Tennessee | 39
Kentucky | 53
LSU | 34

Finals
Tennessee | 38
Kentucky | 46
