= Tom Nisbet =

English rugby league footballer

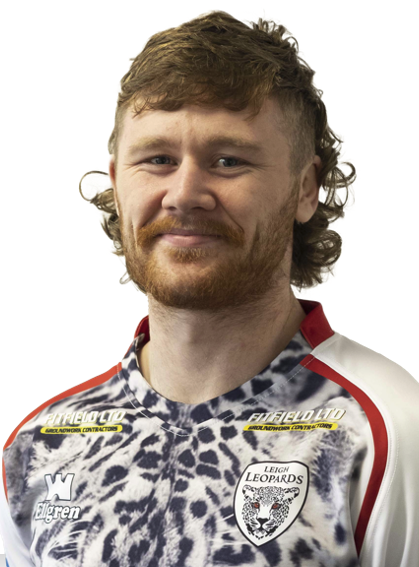

Personal information
- Full name: Thomas Nisbet
- Born: 8 October 1999 (age 26) England
- Height: 6 ft 2 in (1.88 m)
- Weight: 14 st 11 lb (94 kg)

Playing information
- Position: Wing, Second-row, Fullback, Centre
Club
Years	Team	Pld	T	G	FG	P
2020–22	St Helens	1	0	0	0	0
2021(loan)	→ Oldham	1	0	0	0	0
2021(loan)	→Leigh Centurions	1	0	0	0	0
2022(loan)	→Leigh Centurions	9	5	0	0	20
2023–24	Leigh Leopards	4	0	0	0	0
2023(loan)	→Rochdale Hornets	1	0	0	0	0
2024	→Widnes Vikings (loan)	4	1	0	0	4
2025	Townsville Blackhawks	21	3	0	0	12
2026–	Oldham	9	5	0	0	20
	Total	51	14	0	0	56
- Source: As of 1 April 2026

Tom Nisbet (born 8 October 1999) is an English professional rugby league footballer who plays as a wing or second-rower for Oldham in the RFL Championship.

He was previously with St Helens in the Super League. He has previously played on loan at Oldham RLFC in the RFL Championship.

== Background ==
Nisbet signed from amateur team Newton Storm ARLFC and played three seasons at U19 level. He has also represented Lancashire and England Academies.

== Career ==
=== St Helens ===
Nisbet made his first team début for St Helens on the wing against the Salford Red Devils on 26 October 2020. Due to end-of-season fixture congestion caused by the COVID-19 pandemic, Saints fielded a very young side, resting the majority of first team players, in preparation of their derby match against the Wigan Warriors just four days later.

=== Oldham RLFC (loan) ===
On 21 May 2021 it was reported that he had signed for Oldham RLFC in the RFL Championship on loan.

=== Leigh Centurions (loan) ===
On 28 August 2021, it was reported that he had signed for Leigh in the Super League on an initial one-week loan, which was subsequently revised to cover the whole 2022 season.

=== Widnes Vikings (loan) ===
On 1 May 2024 it was reported that he had signed for Widnes Vikings in the RFL Championship on loan

=== Oldham RLFC ===
On 31 October 2025 it was reported that he had signed for Oldham RLFC in the RFL Championship on a 1-year deal
