= 1938–39 Idaho Vandals men's basketball team =

American college basketball season

1938–39 Idaho Vandals men's basketball
- Conference: Pacific Coast Conference
- Record: 12–19 (1–15 PCC)
- Head coach: Forrest Twogood (3rd season)
- Assistant coach: Walter Price
- Home arena: Memorial Gymnasium

1938–39 Pacific Coast Conference men's basketball standings
	Conf.				Overall
Team	W		L	PCT	W		L	PCT
North
Oregon †	14	–	2	.875	29	–	5	.853
Washington	11	–	5	.688	20	–	5	.800
Washington State	8	–	8	.500	23	–	10	.697
Oregon State	6	–	10	.375	13	–	11	.542
Idaho	1	–	15	.063	12	–	19	.387
South
California	9	–	3	.750	24	–	8	.750
USC	9	–	3	.750	20	–	5	.800
Stanford	6	–	6	.500	16	–	9	.640
UCLA	0	–	12	.000	7	–	20	.259
† Conference playoff series winner

The 1938–39 Idaho Vandals men's basketball team represented the University of Idaho during the 1938–39 NCAA college basketball season. Members of the Pacific Coast Conference, the Vandals were led by third-year head coach Forrest Twogood and played their home games on campus at Memorial Gymnasium in Moscow, Idaho.

The Vandals were 12–19 overall and 1–15 in conference play.
