= 1938–39 Michigan Wolverines men's basketball team =

American college basketball season

1938–39 Michigan Wolverines men's basketball
- Conference: Big Ten Conference
- Record: 11–9 (4–8 Big Ten)
- Head coach: Bennie Oosterbaan
- Captain: Leo Beebe
- Home arena: Yost Field House

1938–39 Big Ten Conference men's basketball standings
	Conf.				Overall
Team	W		L	PCT	W		L	PCT
Ohio State	10	–	2	.833	16	–	7	.696
Indiana	9	–	3	.750	17	–	3	.850
Illinois	8	–	4	.667	14	–	5	.737
Minnesota	7	–	5	.583	14	–	6	.700
Purdue	6	–	6	.500	12	–	7	.632
Northwestern	5	–	7	.417	7	–	13	.350
Michigan	4	–	8	.333	11	–	9	.550
Wisconsin	4	–	8	.333	10	–	10	.500
Chicago	4	–	8	.333	9	–	11	.450
Iowa	3	–	9	.250	8	–	11	.421

The 1938–39 Michigan Wolverines men's basketball team represented the University of Michigan in intercollegiate basketball during the 1938–39 season. The team compiled an 11–9 record and 4–8 against Big Ten Conference opponents. The team finished in a tie for seventh place in the Big Ten.

Bennie Oosterbaan was in his first year as the team's coach. Leo Beebe was the team captain, and Edmund Thomas was the team's leading scorer with 140 points in 20 games for an average of 7.0 points per game. Football star Tom Harmon appeared in 13 games for the basketball team and scored 100 points for an average of 7.7 points per game.

== Scoring statistics ==
Player	Games	Field goals	Free throws	Points	Points per game
Edmund Thomas	20	57	26	140	7.0
James Rae	16	48	30	126	7.9
Charles Pink	20	39	32	110	5.5
Tom Harmon	13	38	24	100	7.7
Daniel Smick	19	40	9	89	4.7
Leo Beebe	18	33	13	79	4.4
Michael Sofiak	15	11	9	31	2.1
Russell Dobson	11	7	1	15	1.4
Herbert Brogan	8	5	0	10	1.3
Milo Sukup	10	1	2	4	0.4
Totals	20	279	146	704	35.2

== Coaching staff ==
- Bennie Oosterbaan - coach
- Fielding H. Yost - athletic director
