= 1938–39 Wisconsin Badgers men's basketball team =

American college basketball season

1938–39 Wisconsin Badgers men's basketball
- Conference: Big Ten Conference
- Record: 10–10 (4–8 Big Ten)
- Head coach: Harold E. Foster
- Home arena: UW Fieldhouse

1938–39 Big Ten Conference men's basketball standings
	Conf.				Overall
Team	W		L	PCT	W		L	PCT
Ohio State	10	–	2	.833	16	–	7	.696
Indiana	9	–	3	.750	17	–	3	.850
Illinois	8	–	4	.667	14	–	5	.737
Minnesota	7	–	5	.583	14	–	6	.700
Purdue	6	–	6	.500	12	–	7	.632
Northwestern	5	–	7	.417	7	–	13	.350
Michigan	4	–	8	.333	11	–	9	.550
Wisconsin	4	–	8	.333	10	–	10	.500
Chicago	4	–	8	.333	9	–	11	.450
Iowa	3	–	9	.250	8	–	11	.421

The 1938–39 Wisconsin Badgers men's basketball team represented University of Wisconsin–Madison. The head coach was Harold E. Foster, coaching his fifth season with the Badgers. The team played their home games at the UW Fieldhouse in Madison, Wisconsin and was a member of the Big Ten Conference.

== Schedule ==
Date time, TV	Rank^{#}	Opponent^{#}	Result	Record	Site city, state
Regular Season
12/02/1938*		Beloit (WI)	W 41–26	1–0	UW Fieldhouse; Madison, WI
12/05/1938*		Marquette	W 27–26	2–0	UW Fieldhouse; Madison, WI
12/10/1938*		Notre Dame	W 45–39	3–0	UW Fieldhouse; Madison, WI
12/17/1938*		at Marquette	L 27–46	3–1	Marquette Gymnasium; Milwaukee, WI
12/19/1938*		at Butler	L 21–24	3–2	Butler Fieldhouse; Indianapolis, IN
12/20/1938*		at Xavier	W 27–26	4–2	Schmidt Field House; Cincinnati, OH
1/02/1939*		Detroit	W 34–27	5–2	UW Fieldhouse; Madison, WI
1/07/1939		Iowa	W 28–24	6–2 (1–0)	UW Fieldhouse; Madison, WI
1/09/1939		Chicago	L 18–28	6–3 (1–1)	UW Fieldhouse; Madison, WI
1/14/1939		at Indiana	L 19–43	6–4 (1–2)	IU Fieldhouse; Bloomington, IN
1/16/1939		at Michigan	W 42–39	7–4 (2–2)	Yost Field House; Ann Arbor, MI
1/21/1939		Illinois	L 34–37	7–5 (2–3)	UW Fieldhouse; Madison, WI
2/04/1939*		Michigan State	W 39–37	8–5	UW Fieldhouse; Madison, WI
2/06/1939		at Purdue	L 31–39	8–6 (2–4)	Lambert Fieldhouse; West Lafayette, IN
2/13/1939		at Northwestern	L 27–37	8–7 (2–5)	Patten Gymnasium; Evanston, IL
2/18/1939		Purdue	W 32–30 ^{OT}	9–7 (3–5)	UW Fieldhouse; Madison, WI
2/20/1939		at Minnesota	L 32–34	9–8 (3–6)	Minnesota Field House; Minneapolis, MN
2/25/1939		Ohio State	L 38–46	9–9 (3–7)	UW Fieldhouse; Madison, WI
2/27/1939		Minnesota	W 35–25	10–9 (4–7)	UW Fieldhouse; Madison, WI
3/04/1939		at Chicago	L 33–39	10–10 (4–8)	Henry Crown Field House; Chicago, IL
*Non-conference game. ^{#}Rankings from AP Poll. (#) Tournament seedings in parentheses.
