= Howard Black =

- Pitcher
- Batted: Unknown Threw: Left

Negro league baseball debut
- 1926, for the Cleveland Elites

Last appearance
- 1926, for the Dayton Marcos
- Stats at Baseball Reference

Teams
- Cleveland Elites (1926); Dayton Marcos (1926)

Howard Black was an American professional baseball pitcher in the Negro leagues. He played with the Cleveland Elites and Dayton Marcos in 1926.
