= 1939 NAIA basketball tournament =

College basketball tournament

1939 NAIA men's basketball tournament
- Teams: 32
- Finals site: Municipal Auditorium, Kansas City, Missouri
- Champions: Southwestern (KS) (1st title, 1st title game, 2nd Final Four)
- Runner-up: San Diego State (1st title game, 1st Final Four)
- Semifinalists: Glenville State (1st Final Four); Peru State (1st Final Four)
- MVP: Edgar Hinshaw (Southwestern (Kan.))

The 1939 NAIA basketball tournament was held in March at Municipal Auditorium in Kansas City, Missouri. The 3rd annual NAIA basketball tournament featured 32 teams playing in a single-elimination format. This was also the year the NCAA basketball tournament was started.

This tournament also featured the lowest-scoring game in tournament history between Loras College (Iowa) and Central Missouri State University, the two-time champions. Loras scored a total of 16 points, a tournament low as well, Central Missouri State won the game with a total score of 20. The total combined score of the game was 36, resulting in the all-time lowest scoring game in tournament history.

New Mexico A&M and Mississippi College were selected for the tournament, but did not make the trip to Kansas City. They were replaced by Wayne State and Culver-Stockton respectively. Notre Dame had also been given an invite to compete, but because of scheduling conflicts, the Fighting Irish declined. Ottawa was also included in the field, but withdrew due to illness. They were replaced by Anderson College.

The championship game featured Southwestern (KS) defeat San Diego State by a score of 32-31. It would be the closest final score until the 1981 tournament which ended in overtime with a score of 86-85. (1939, 1981, and 2016 are the only three years a team has won by one point, to date.)

This year the NAIA awarded the first Chuck Taylor Most Valuable Player Award. The first award went to Edgar Hinshaw of Southwestern College

== Awards and honors ==
Many of the records set by the 1939 tournament have been broken, and many of the awards were established much later:

- Leading scorer est. 1963
- Leading rebounder est. 1963
- Charles Stevenson Hustle Award est. 1958
- Coach of the Year est. 1954
- Player of the Year est. 1994
- Fewest points by team; single game: 16, Loras (Iowa) vs. Central Missouri State 20.
- Fewest points in a tournament Game; both teams: 36 total; Central Missouri State vs. Loras (Iowa) (20-16).

== Bracket ==
First round	Second round
Wayne (MI)	55
Anderson (IN)	26
Wayne (MI)	50
Glenville State	56
Glenville State	49
Simpson	34
TOP TIER
St. Ambrose	37
New Mexico Mines	22
St. Ambrose	42
Dakota Wesleyan	21
Dakota Wesleyan	41
West Texas State	38
Southwestern (KS)	39
Eau Claire State	30
Southwestern (KS)	37
Westminster (MO)	31
Westminster (MO)	33
Delta State	32
TOP TIER
NW Missouri State	35
Wayne State (NE)	20
NW Missouri State	30
Culver-Stockton	24
Culver-Stockton	53
Winona State	40
Central Missouri State	20
Columbia (IA)	16
Central Missouri State	32
Augustana (IL)	29
Augustana (IL)	49
Northwestern State (LA)	43
BOTTOM TIER
Trinity (TX)	44
Alfred Holbrook	41
Trinity (TX)	42*
Peru State	48
Peru State	55
High Point	46
Murray State	43
Jordan	37
Murray State	39
Manchester	42
Central State (OK)	50
Manchester	53
BOTTOM TIER
San Diego State	49
Northern State	25
San Diego State	41
East Texas State	36
SW Missouri State	45
East Texas State	68

Elite Eight
Glenville State	52
St. Ambrose	42
Southwestern (KS)	53
NW Missouri State	37
Peru State	45
Central Missouri State	31
Manchester	41
San Diego State	49

NAIA national semifinals
Glenville State	37
Southwestern (KS)	46
Peru State	39
San Diego State	49

NAIA national championship
Southwestern (KS)	32
San Diego State	31
NAIA third-place game
Glenville State	73
Peru State	49

- * denotes overtime.

== See also ==
- 1939 National Invitation Tournament
