= 1938–39 Cincinnati Bearcats men's basketball team =

American college basketball season

1938–39 Cincinnati Bearcats men's basketball
- Conference: Independent
- Record: 12–5
- Head coach: Rip Van Winkle (2nd season)
- Captain: Robert Biedenbender
- Home arena: Schmidlapp Gymnasium

The 1938–39 Cincinnati Bearcats men's basketball team represented the University of Cincinnati during the 1938–39 NCAA men's basketball season. The head coach was Walter Van Winkle, coaching his second season with the Bearcats. The team finished with an overall record of 12–5.

== Schedule ==
Date time, TV	Opponent	Result	Record	Site city, state
December 7	Georgetown (KY)	W 47–31	1–0	Schmidlapp Gymnasium; Cincinnati, OH
December 10	Morehead (KY)	W 40–19	2–0	Schmidlapp Gymnasium; Cincinnati, OH
December 14	vs. Wayne (MI)	L 36–53	2–1	
December 17	at Kentucky	L 27–44	2–2	Alumni Gymnasium; Lexington, KY
December 21	at Louisville	W 54–41	3–2	Louisville, KY
December 23	Wilmington	W 38–27	4–2	Schmidlapp Gymnasium; Cincinnati, OH
December 30	at Toledo	L 25–43	4–3	The Field House; Toledo, OH
January 5	at Miami (OH)	W 43–31	5–3	Withrow Court; Oxford, OH
January 10	Dayton	W 46–27	6–3	Schmidlapp Gymnasium; Cincinnati, OH
January 14	Louisville	W 62–17	7–3	Schmidlapp Gymnasium; Cincinnati, OH
January 17	at Marshall	L 22–23	7–4	Huntington, WV
January 21	Alumni	W 51–40	8–4	Schmidlapp Gymnasium; Cincinnati, OH
February 4	at Dayton	L 27–40	8–5	Montgomery County Fair Grounds Coliseum; Dayton, OH
February 7	at Wilmington	W 49–36	9–5	Wilmington, OH
February 11	at Western Reserve	W 40–30	10–5	
February 18	Marshall	W 35–30	11–5	Schmidlapp Gymnasium; Cincinnati, OH
February 22	Miami (OH)	W 46–31	12–5	Schmidlapp Gymnasium; Cincinnati, OH
*Non-conference game. (#) Tournament seedings in parentheses.
