= 1938–39 Long Island Blackbirds men's basketball team =

American college basketball season

1938–39 Long Island Blackbirds men's basketball

National Invitation Tournament Champions Helms Foundation National Champions
- Conference: Independent
- Record: 23–0
- Head coach: Clair Bee (8th season)

The 1938–39 Long Island Blackbirds men's basketball team represented Long Island University during the 1938–39 NCAA men's basketball season in the United States. The head coach was Clair Bee, coaching in his eighth season with the Blackbirds. The team finished the season with a 23–0 record.

The Blackbirds won the second-ever National Invitation Tournament (NIT), going 3–0 in the tournament with a win over Loyola of Chicago in the championship game.

The team was later retroactively named the national champion by the Helms Athletic Foundation and was also retroactively listed as the top team of the season by the Premo-Porretta Power Poll.

== Schedule and results ==
| Date time, TV | Rank^{#} | Opponent^{#} | Result | Record | Site city, state |
Regular season
| * | | Newark | W 64–14 | 1–0 | Brooklyn, NY |
| * | | Panzer | W 41–35 | 2–0 | Brooklyn, NY |
| * | | Princeton Seminary | W 82–37 | 3–0 | Brooklyn, NY |
| * | | Stroudsburg | W 63–33 | 4–0 | Brooklyn, NY |
| * | | McGill | W 77–39 | 5–0 | Brooklyn, NY |
| * | | Montclair State | W 63–40 | 6–0 | Brooklyn, NY |
| * | | vs. USC | W 33–18 | 7–0 | Madison Square Garden; New York, NY |
| * | | vs. Kentucky | W 52–34 | 8–0 | Madison Square Garden; New York, NY |
| * | | vs. Marquette | W 41–36 | 9–0 | Madison Square Garden; New York, NY |
| * | | New York Athletic Club | W 64–36 | 10–0 | Brooklyn, NY |
| * | | vs. Toledo | W 46–39 | 11–0 | Madison Square Garden; New York, NY |
| * | | Geneva | W 48–39 | 12–0 | Brooklyn, NY |
| * | | vs. Duquesne | W 48–31 | 13–0 | Madison Square Garden; New York, NY |
| * | | Scranton | W 65–53 | 14–0 | Brooklyn, NY |
| * | | Canisius | W 62–50 | 15–0 | Brooklyn, NY |
| * | | St. Francis (NY) | W 61–20 | 16–0 | Brooklyn, NY |
| * | | St. Bonaventure | W 70–31 | 17–0 | Brooklyn, NY |
| * | | Baltimore | W 52–34 | 18–0 | Brooklyn, NY |
| * | | John Marshall | W 65–25 | 19–0 | Brooklyn, NY |
| * | | at La Salle | W 28–21 | 20–0 | Wister Hall; Philadelphia, PA |
National Invitation Tournament
| March 16* | | vs. New Mexico State; NIT Quarterfinals | W 52–45 | 21–0 | Madison Square Garden; New York, NY |
| March 20* | | vs. Bradley; NIT Semifinals | W 36–32 | 22–0 | Madison Square Garden; New York, NY |
| March 22* | | vs. Loyola (IL); NIT Championship | W 44–32 | 23–0 | Madison Square Garden; New York, NY |
*Non-conference game. ^{#}Rankings from AP Poll. (#) Tournament seedings in parentheses.
