= 1938–39 Villanova Wildcats men's basketball team =

American college basketball season

1938–39 Villanova Wildcats men's basketball

NCAA tournament, Final Four
- Conference: Independent
- Record: 20–5
- Head coach: Alex Severance (3rd season)
- Home arena: Villanova Field House

The 1938–39 Villanova Wildcats men's basketball team represented Villanova University during the 1938-39 NCAA University Division men's basketball season. The team was led by head coach Alex Severance and played its home games on campus at Villanova Field House in Villanova, Pennsylvania.

The independent Wildcats reached the program's first Final Four during the first-ever NCAA tournament before falling to Ohio State, 53–36, in the National semifinals. Villanova finished with a 20–5 (.800) record.

== Roster ==
1938–39 Villanova Wildcats men's basketball team
Players
Coaches

Pos.	#	Name	Height	Weight	Year	Hometown
		Walter Burlington	—	—
		Louis Dubino	—	—
G		George Duzminski	—	—
F		John Krutalis	—	—
F		Michael Lazorchak	—	—
C		James Montgomery	—	—	Sr
G		Paul Nugent	—	—	So
		Lloyd Rice	—	—
		Ernest Robinson	—	—
		William Sinnott	—	—
G		Art Vigilante	—	—
		Charles Yung	—	—

Head coach

- Alex Severance (Villanova)

Assistant coach(es)

Legend

- (C) Team captain
- (S) Suspended
- (I) Ineligible
- (W) Walk-on
- Injured
- Current redshirt

== Schedule and results ==
Date time, TV	Rank^{#}	Opponent^{#}	Result	Record	Site city, state
Regular season
Feb 17, 1939*		vs. St. Joseph	W 36–8		Palestra; Philadelphia, Pennsylvania
NCAA Tournament
Mar 17, 1939*		vs. Brown; East Regional Final – Elite Eight	W 42–30	20–4	Palestra; Philadelphia, Pennsylvania
Mar 18, 1939*		vs. Ohio State; National Semifinal – Final Four	L 36–53	20–5	Palesta; Philadelphia, Pennsylvania
*Non-conference game. ^{#}Rankings from AP Poll. (#) Tournament seedings in parentheses. E=East.
