= 1939 National Invitation Tournament =

Annual NCAA basketball competition

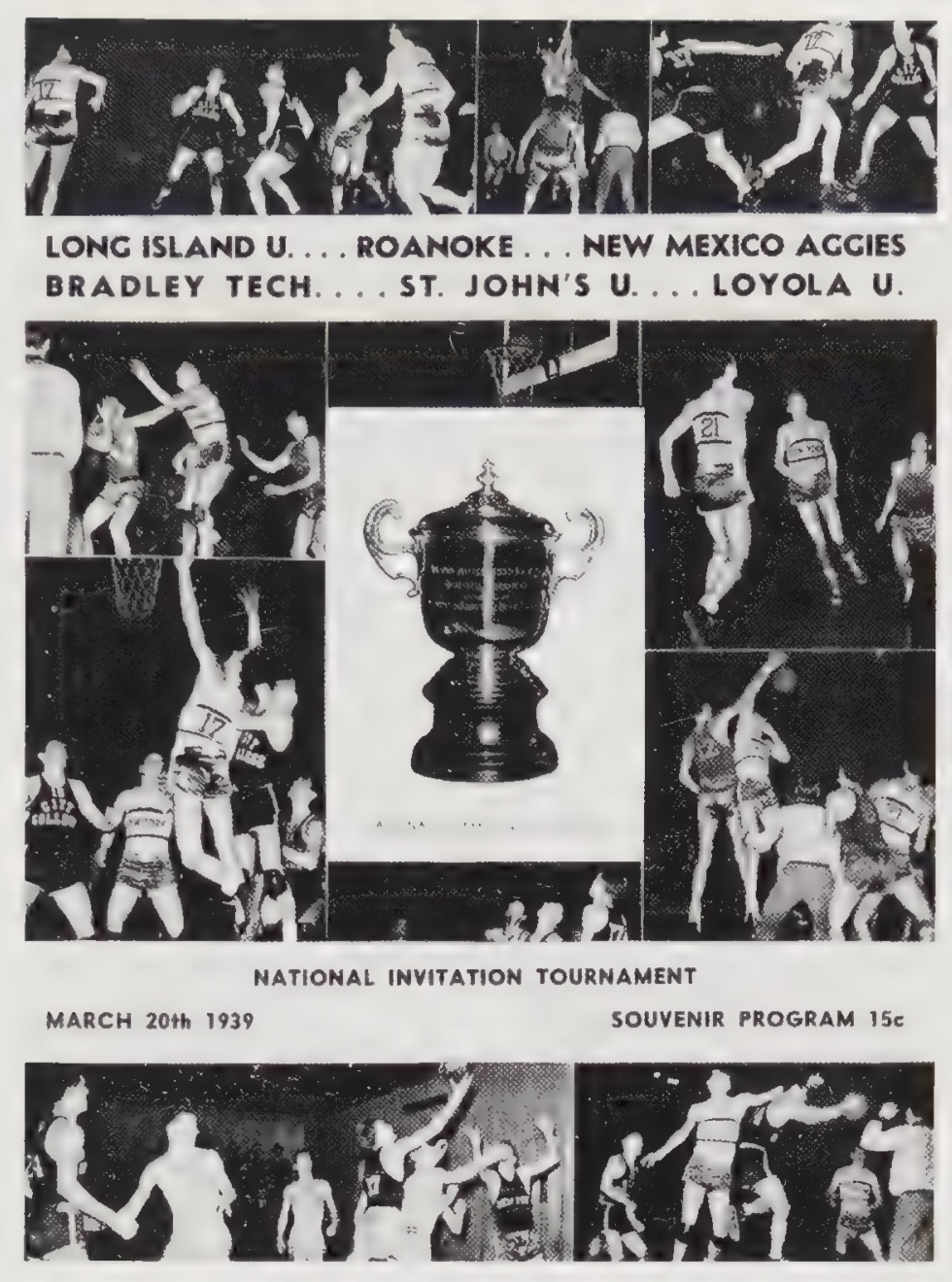
- Souvenir program from the tournament.

Tournament details
- City: New York City
- Venue: Madison Square Garden
- Teams: 6

Final positions
- Champions: Long Island-Brooklyn Blackbirds (1st title)
- Runners-up: Loyola-Chicago Ramblers
- Semifinalists: Bradley Braves; St. John's Red Storm

Awards
- MVP: Bill Lloyd (St. John's)

The 1939 National Invitation Tournament was the second edition of the annual college basketball competition.

The championship game between Long Island (22–0) and Loyola (21–0) is the only time in men's college basketball history where two undefeated major college teams met in a postseason tournament final for a national championship.

== Selected teams ==
Below is a list of the six teams selected for the tournament.

- Bradley
- Long Island
- Loyola (IL)
- New Mexico A&M
- Roanoke
- St. John's

== Bracket ==
Below is the tournament bracket.

Quarterfinals
Long Island	52
New Mexico A&M	45
St. John's	71
Roanoke	47

Semifinals
Bradley	32
Long Island	36
Loyola–Chicago	51
St. John's	46

Finals
Long Island	44
Loyola–Chicago	32
Third place
Bradley	40
St. John's	35

== See also ==
- 1939 NCAA basketball tournament
- 1939 NAIA Basketball Tournament
