= 1938–39 La Salle Explorers men's basketball team =

American college basketball season

1938–39 La Salle Explorers men's basketball
- Conference: Independent
- Record: 13–6
- Head coach: Leonard Tanseer (6th season)
- Captain: Frank Hoerst
- Home arena: Wister Hall

The 1938–39 La Salle Explorers men's basketball team represented La Salle University during the 1938–39 NCAA men's basketball season. The head coach was Leonard Tanseer, coaching the Explorers in his sixth season. The team finished with an overall record of 13–6.

== Schedule ==
| Date time, TV | Opponent | Result | Record | Site city, state |
|---|---|---|---|---|
| Dec 2, 1938 | Roanoke | L 30–31 | 0–1 | Wister Hall; Philadelphia, PA |
| Dec. 6, 1938 | Alumni | W 34–24 | 1–1 | Wister Hall; Philadelphia, PA |
| Dec 9, 1938 | Seton Hall | W 34–32 ^{ot} | 2–1 | Wister Hall; Philadelphia, PA |
| Dec. 14, 1938 | at Illinois Wesleyan | W 25–23 | 3–1 | Bloomington, IL |
| Dec. 20, 1938 | at Millersville | W 31–30 | 4–1 | Millersville, PA |
| Jan. 6, 1939 | Temple | W 38–27 | 5–1 | Wister Hall; Philadelphia, PA |
| Jan 10, 1939 | at West Chester | W 46–31 | 6–1 | West Chester, PA |
| Jan. 12, 1939 | at Scranton | L 25–33 | 6–2 | Scranton, PA |
| Jan. 19, 1939 | Mount St. Mary's | W 34–26 | 7–2 | Wister Hall; Philadelphia, PA |
| Jan. 21, 1939 | at P.M.C. | L 31–36 | 7–3 | |
| Jan. 24, 1939 | Millersville | W 40–29 | 8–3 | Wister Hall; Philadelphia, PA |
| Jan. 28, 1939 | St. Francis (NY) | W 36–26 | 9–3 | Wister Hall; Philadelphia, PA |
| Feb. 3, 1937 | Saint Joseph's | W 32–31 | 10–3 | Wister Hall; Philadelphia, PA |
| Feb. 8, 1939 | Lebanon Valley | W 49–41 | 11–3 | Wister Hall; Philadelphia, PA |
| Feb. 11, 1939 | at C.C.N.Y. | L 39–43 | 11–4 | New York, NY |
| Feb. 14, 1939 | West Chester | W 48–40 | 12–4 | Wister Hall; Philadelphia, PA |
| Feb. 17, 1939 | P.M.C. | W 46–28 | 13–4 | Wister Hall; Philadelphia, PA |
| Feb. 23, 1939 | at Catholic | L 40–45 | 13–5 | Washington, D.C. |
| Mar. 3, 1939 | Long Island | L 21–28 | 13–6 | Wister Hall; Philadelphia, PA |
*Non-conference game. (#) Tournament seedings in parentheses.
