= 1938–39 Connecticut State Huskies men's basketball team =

American college basketball season

1938–39 Connecticut State Huskies men's basketball
- Conference: New England Conference
- Record: 12–6 (6–2 NEC)
- Head coach: Don White (3rd season)
- Home arena: Hawley Armory

1938–39 New England Conference men's basketball standings
	Conf.				Overall
Team	W		L	PCT	W		L	PCT
Rhode Island State	7	–	1	.875	17	–	4	.810
Connecticut	6	–	2	.750	12	–	6	.667
Maine	4	–	4	.500	8	–	4	.667
Northeastern	3	–	5	.375	6	–	12	.333
New Hampshire	0	–	8	.000	3	–	14	.176

The 1938–39 Connecticut State Huskies men's basketball team represented Connecticut State College, now the University of Connecticut, in the 1938–39 collegiate men's basketball season. The Huskies completed the season with a 12–6 overall record. The Huskies were members of the New England Conference, where they ended the season with a 6–2 record. The Huskies played their home games at Hawley Armory in Storrs, Connecticut, and were led by third-year head coach Don White.

== Schedule ==
Date time, TV	Rank^{#}	Opponent^{#}	Result	Record	Site (attendance) city, state
Regular Season
*		Arnold	W 51–39	1–0	
*		Brown	L 31–51	1–1	
*		Indiana	L 38–71	1–2	
*		Purdue	L 30–51	1–3	
12/21/1938*		at Illinois	L 23–49	1–4	Huff Hall (4,763); Champaign, IL
		Northeastern	W 32–26	2–4 (1–0)	
		Maine	L 29–45	2–5 (1–1)	
		New Hampshire	W 41–38	3–5 (2–1)	
		Rhode Island	L 62–76	3–6 (2–2)	
*		Coast Guard	W 49–34	4–6	
		New Hampshire	W 59–38	5–6 (3–2)	
		Maine	W 53–49	6–6 (4–2)	
*		Coast Guard	W 82–42	7–6	
*		Massachusetts	W 58–47	8–6	
*		Wesleyan	W 54–41	9–6	
		Rhode Island	W 68–67	10–6 (5–2)	
*		Worcester Polytech	W 49–48	11–6	
		Northeastern	W 48–38	12–6 (6–2)	
*Non-conference game. ^{#}Rankings from AP Poll. (#) Tournament seedings in parentheses. All times are in Eastern Time.

Schedule Source:
