= 1938–39 Washington Huskies men's basketball team =

American college basketball season

1938–39 Washington Huskies men's basketball
- Conference: Pacific Coast Conference
- Record: 20–5 (11–5 PCC)
- Head coach: Hec Edmundson (19th season)
- Captain: George Ziegenfuss
- Home arena: UW Pavilion

1938–39 Pacific Coast Conference men's basketball standings
	Conf.				Overall
Team	W		L	PCT	W		L	PCT
North
Oregon †	14	–	2	.875	29	–	5	.853
Washington	11	–	5	.688	20	–	5	.800
Washington State	8	–	8	.500	23	–	10	.697
Oregon State	6	–	10	.375	13	–	11	.542
Idaho	1	–	15	.063	12	–	19	.387
South
California	9	–	3	.750	24	–	8	.750
USC	9	–	3	.750	20	–	5	.800
Stanford	6	–	6	.500	16	–	9	.640
UCLA	0	–	12	.000	7	–	20	.259
† Conference playoff series winner

The 1938–39 Washington Huskies men's basketball team represented the University of Washington for the 1938–39 NCAA college basketball season. Led by nineteenth-year head coach Hec Edmundson, the Huskies were members of the Pacific Coast Conference and played their home games on campus at the UW Pavilion in Seattle, Washington.

The Huskies were 20–5 overall in the regular season and 11–5 in conference play; second in the Northern division.

After a six-game winning streak, Washington was a game behind leader Oregon with two games remaining, both against the Webfoots in Seattle. Oregon won the first to clinch the title, then won the finale as well; they went on to win the conference title (swept California) and the first NCAA tournament, which had an eight-team field.
