= List of Washington Huskies men's basketball seasons =

This is a list of the seasons completed by the Washington Huskies men's basketball team.

== Seasons ==
Statistics overview
Season	Coach	Overall	Conference	Standing	Postseason
No coach (Independent) (1895–1908)
1895–96	No coach	1–1			
1896–98	No team				
1898–99	No coach	1–1			
1899–1901	No team				
1901–02	No coach	7–0			
1902–03	No coach	3–4			
1903–04	No coach	6–3–1			
1904–05	No coach	4–1			
1905–1908	No team				
No coach:		22–10–1 (.682)			
David C. Hall (Northwest Intercollegiate Conference) (1908–1910)
1908–09	David C. Hall	9–1	N/A		
1909–10	David C. Hall	14–6	N/A		
Hall:		23–7 (.767)	N/A		
Warner Williams (Northwest Intercollegiate Conference) (1910–1911)
1910–11	Warner Williams	11–1	N/A	1st	
Williams:		11–1 (.917)	N/A		
Oscar Olson (Northwest Intercollegiate Conference) (1911–1913)
1911–12	Oscar Olson	12–5	8–4		
1912–13	Oscar Olson	14–5	11–5		
Olson:		26–10 (.722)	19–9 (.679)		
Anthony Savage (Northwest Intercollegiate Conference) (1913–1915)
1913–14	Anthony Savage	12–2	12–2	1st	
1914–15	Anthony Savage	17–2	11–1	1st	
Savage:		29–4 (.879)	23–3 (.885)		
John Davidson (Pacific Coast Conference) (1915–1917)
1915–16	John Davidson	7–7	2–6	3rd	
1916–17	John Davidson	9–8	7–5	3rd	
Davidson:		16–15 (.516)	9–11 (.450)		
Claude J. Hunt (Pacific Coast Conference) (1917–1919)
1917–18	Claude J. Hunt	4–8	N/A		
1918–19	Claude J. Hunt	6–10	5–7	4th	
Hunt:		10–18 (.357)	5–7 (.417)		
Stub Allison (Pacific Coast Conference) (1919–1920)
1919–20	Stub Allison	7–8	5–7	T–4th	
Allison:		7–8 (.467)	5–7 (.417)		
Hec Edmundson (Pacific Coast Conference) (1920–1947)
1920–21	Hec Edmundson	18–4	10–4	3rd	
1921–22	Hec Edmundson	13–5	11–5	4th	
1922–23	Hec Edmundson	12–4	5–3	T–1st (North)	
1923–24	Hec Edmundson	12–4	6–2	1st (North)	
1924–25	Hec Edmundson	14–7	5–5	T–3rd (North)	
1925–26	Hec Edmundson	10–6	5–5	4th (North)	
1926–27	Hec Edmundson	15–4	7–3	T–2nd (North)	
1927–28	Hec Edmundson	22–6	9–1	1st (North)	
1928–29	Hec Edmundson	18–2	10–0	1st (North)	
1929–30	Hec Edmundson	21–7	12–4	1st (North)	
1930–31	Hec Edmundson	25–3	14–2	1st (North)	
1931–32	Hec Edmundson	19–6	12–4	1st (North)	
1932–33	Hec Edmundson	22–6	10–6	2nd (North)	
1933–34	Hec Edmundson	20–5	14–2	1st (North)	
1934–35	Hec Edmundson	16–8	11–5	2nd (North)	
1935–36	Hec Edmundson	25–7	13–3	1st (North)	
1936–37	Hec Edmundson	15–11	11–5	T–1st (North)	
1937–38	Hec Edmundson	29–7	13–7	2nd (North)	
1938–39	Hec Edmundson	20–5	11–5	2nd (North)	
1939–40	Hec Edmundson	10–15	6–10	4th (North)	
1940–41	Hec Edmundson	12–13	7–9	T–3rd (North)	
1941–42	Hec Edmundson	18–7	10–6	2nd (North)	
1942–43	Hec Edmundson	24–7	12–4	1st (North)	NCAA Elite Eight
1943–44	Hec Edmundson	26–6	15–1	1st (North)	
1944–45	Hec Edmundson	22–18	5–11	4th (North)	
1945–46	Hec Edmundson	14–14	6–10	4th (North)	
1946–47	Hec Edmundson	16–8	8–8	3rd (North)	
Edmundson:		488–195 (.714)	258–130 (.665)		
Art McLarney (Pacific Coast Conference) (1947–1950)
1947–48	Art McLarney	23–11	10–6	T–1st (North)	NCAA Elite Eight
1948–49	Art McLarney	11–15	6–10	5th (North)	
1949–50	Art McLarney	19–10	8–8	T–2nd (North)	
McLarney:		53–36 (.596)	24–24 (.500)		
Tippy Dye (Pacific Coast Conference) (1950–1959)
1950–51	Tippy Dye	24–6	11–5	1st (North)	NCAA Elite Eight
1951–52	Tippy Dye	25–6	14–2	1st (North)	
1952–53	Tippy Dye	28–3	15–1	1st (North)	NCAA Final Four
1953–54	Tippy Dye	8–18	7–9	4th (North)	
1954–55	Tippy Dye	13–12	7–9	3rd (North)	
1955–56	Tippy Dye	15–11	11–5	2nd	
1956–57	Tippy Dye	17–9	13–3	T–2nd	
1957–58	Tippy Dye	8–18	5–11	8th	
1958–59	Tippy Dye	18–8	11–5	2nd	
Dye:		156–91 (.632)	94–50 (.653)		
John Grayson (Athletic Association of Western Universities) (1959–1963)
1959–60	John Grayson	15–13	2–9	5th	
1960–61	John Grayson	13–13	6–6	3rd	
1961–62	John Grayson	16–10	5–7	T–3rd	
1962–63	John Grayson	13–13	6–6	T–3rd	
Grayson:		57–49 (.538)	19–28 (.404)		
Mac Duckworth (Athletic Association of Western Universities) (1963–1968)
1963–64	Mac Duckworth	9–17	5–10	5th	
1964–65	Mac Duckworth	9–16	5–9	6th	
1965–66	Mac Duckworth	10–15	4–10	T–6th	
1966–67	Mac Duckworth	13–12	6–8	T–5th	
1967–68	Mac Duckworth	12–14	4–10	7th	
Duckworth:		53–74 (.417)	24–47 (.338)		
Tex Winter (Pacific–8 Conference) (1968–1971)
1968–69	Tex Winter	13–13	6–8	4th	
1969–70	Tex Winter	17–9	7–7	5th	
1970–71	Tex Winter	15–13	6–8	5th	
Winter:		45–35 (.563)	19–23 (.452)		
Marv Harshman (Pacific–8 / Pacific–10 Conference) (1971–1985)
1971–72	Marv Harshman	20–6	10–4	2nd	
1972–73	Marv Harshman	16–11	6–8	T–5th	
1973–74	Marv Harshman	16–10	7–7	4th	
1974–75	Marv Harshman	16–10	6–8	T–5th	
1975–76	Marv Harshman	23–5	10–4	3rd	NCAA Division I first round
1976–77	Marv Harshman	17–10	8–6	T–3rd	
1977–78	Marv Harshman	14–13	6–8	T–5th	
1978–79	Marv Harshman	11–16	6–12	T–8th	
1979–80	Marv Harshman	18–10	9–9	5th	NIT first round
1980–81	Marv Harshman	14–13	8–10	T–5th	
1981–82	Marv Harshman	19–10	11–7	4th	NIT second round
1982–83	Marv Harshman	16–15	7–11	T–6th	
1983–84	Marv Harshman	24–7	15–3	T–1st	NCAA Division I Sweet Sixteen
1984–85	Marv Harshman	22–10	13–5	T–1st	NCAA Division I first round
Harshman:		246–146 (.628)	122–102 (.545)		
Andy Russo (Pacific–10 Conference) (1985–1989)
1985–86	Andy Russo	19–12	13–5	2nd	NCAA Division I first round
1986–87	Andy Russo	20–15	10–8	T–3rd	NIT quarterfinal
1987–88	Andy Russo	10–19	5–13	T–8th	
1988–89	Andy Russo	12–16	8–10	6th	
Russo:		61–62 (.496)	36–36 (.500)		
Lynn Nance (Pacific–10 Conference) (1989–1993)
1989–90	Lynn Nance	11–17	5–13	9th	
1990–91	Lynn Nance	14–14	5–13	10th	
1991–92	Lynn Nance	12–17	5–13	8th	
1992–93	Lynn Nance	13–14	7–11	8th	
Nance:		50–62 (.446)	22–50 (.306)		
Bob Bender (Pacific–10 Conference) (1993–2002)
1993–94	Bob Bender	5–22	3–15	9th	
1994–95	Bob Bender	10–17	6–12	T–7th	
1995–96	Bob Bender	16–12	9–9	T–4th	NIT first round
1996–97	Bob Bender	17–11	10–8	6th	NIT first round
1997–98	Bob Bender	20–10	11–7	4th	NCAA Division I Sweet Sixteen
1998–99	Bob Bender	17–12	10–8	4th	NCAA Division I first round
1999–2000	Bob Bender	10–20	5–13	8th	
2000–01	Bob Bender	10–20	4–14	T–9th	
2001–02	Bob Bender	11–18	5–13	8th	
Bender:		116–142 (.450)	63–99 (.389)		
Lorenzo Romar (Pacific–10 / Pac–12 Conference) (2002–2017)
2002–03	Lorenzo Romar	10–17	5–13	9th	
2003–04	Lorenzo Romar	19–12	12–6	2nd	NCAA Division I first round
2004–05	Lorenzo Romar	29–6	14–4	2nd	NCAA Division I Sweet Sixteen
2005–06	Lorenzo Romar	26–7	13–5	2nd	NCAA Division I Sweet Sixteen
2006–07	Lorenzo Romar	19–13	8–10	7th	
2007–08	Lorenzo Romar	16–17	7–11	8th	CBI first round
2008–09	Lorenzo Romar	26–9	14–4	1st	NCAA Division I second round
2009–10	Lorenzo Romar	26–10	11–7	3rd	NCAA Division I Sweet Sixteen
2010–11	Lorenzo Romar	24–11	11–7	3rd	NCAA Division I second round
2011–12	Lorenzo Romar	24–11	14–4	1st	NIT semifinal
2012–13	Lorenzo Romar	18–16	9–9	T–6th	NIT first round
2013–14	Lorenzo Romar	17–15	9–9	T–9th	
2014–15	Lorenzo Romar	16–15	5–13	11th	
2015–16	Lorenzo Romar	19–15	9–9	T–6th	NIT second round
2016–17	Lorenzo Romar	9–22	2–16	11th	
Romar:		298–195 (.604)	143–127 (.530)		
Mike Hopkins (Pac–12 Conference) (2017–2024)
2017–18	Mike Hopkins	21–13	10–8	T–6th	NIT second round
2018–19	Mike Hopkins	27–9	15–3	1st	NCAA Division I second round
2019–20	Mike Hopkins	15–17	5–13	12th	Postseason cancelled due to the COVID-19 pandemic.
2020–21	Mike Hopkins	5–21	4–16	11th	
2021–22	Mike Hopkins	17–15	11–9	T–5th	
2022–23	Mike Hopkins	16–16	8–12	T–8th	
2023–24	Mike Hopkins	17–15	9–11	T–6th	
Hopkins:		118–106 (.527)	62–72 (.463)		
Danny Sprinkle (Big Ten Conference) (2024–present)
2024–25	Danny Sprinkle	13–18	4–16	18th	
2025–26	Danny Sprinkle	16–17	7–13	T–12th	
Sprinkle:		29–35 (.453)	11–29 (.275)		
Total:		1,896–1,299 (.593)			
National champion Postseason invitational champion Conference regular season champion Conference regular season and conference tournament champion Division regular season champion Division regular season and conference tournament champion Conference tournament champion
