= 1920–21 Idaho Vandals men's basketball team =

American college basketball season

1920–21 Idaho Vandals men's basketball
- Conference: Independent
- Record: 18–5
- Head coach: Dave MacMillan (1st season)
- Assistant coach: Chick Evans
- Captain: Elra "Squinty" Hunter
- Home arena: Armory and Gymnasium

The 1920–21 Idaho Vandals men's basketball team represented the University of Idaho during the 1920–21 college basketball season. The Vandals were led by first-year head coach Dave MacMillan and played their home games on campus at the Armory and Gymnasium in Moscow, Idaho.

The Vandals were 18–5 overall..

This was the last basketball season before joining the Pacific Coast Conference; Idaho and won the PCC title the first two years as a member.
