= 1919–20 Idaho Vandals men's basketball team =

American college basketball season

1919–20 Idaho Vandals men's basketball
- Conference: Independent
- Record: 11–7
- Head coach: Ralph Hutchinson (1st season)
- Captain: Ernest "Prex" Lindley
- Home arena: Armory and Gymnasium

The 1919–20 Idaho Vandals men's basketball team represented the University of Idaho during the 1919–20 college basketball season. The Vandals were led by Ralph Hutchinson, in his only season as Idaho's head basketball coach, and played their home games on campus at the Armory and Gymnasium in Moscow, Idaho.

The Vandals were 11–7 in overall play.

The state high school tournament (now IHSAA) was hosted by the university in mid-March.

Dave MacMillan became the head coach after this season.
