= 1921–22 Idaho Vandals men's basketball team =

American college basketball season

1921–22 Idaho Vandals men's basketball

Pacific Coast Conference Champions

National Tournament, Quarterfinal
- Conference: Pacific Coast Conference
- Record: 19–2 (7–0 PCC)
- Head coach: Dave MacMillan (2nd season)
- Captain: Rich Fox
- Home arena: Armory and Gymnasium

1921–22 Pacific Coast Conference men's basketball standings
	Conf.				Overall
Team	W		L	PCT	W		L	PCT
Idaho	7	–	0	1.000	19	–	2	.905
Oregon Agricultural	10	–	2	.833	21	–	2	.913
California	10	–	4	.714	19	–	6	.760
Washington	11	–	5	.688	13	–	5	.722
Stanford	4	–	6	.400	8	–	7	.533
Washington State	4	–	11	.267	9	–	17	.346
USC	1	–	3	.250	7	–	5	.583
Oregon	0	–	16	.000	7	–	24	.226
As of 1922

The 1921–22 Idaho Vandals men's basketball team represented the University of Idaho during the 1921–22 college basketball season. Members of the Pacific Coast Conference, the Vandals were led by second-year head coach Dave MacMillan and played their home games on campus at the Armory and Gymnasium in Moscow, Idaho.

The Vandals were 19–2 overall and 7–0 in conference play.

The PCC became an eight-team league this year with the addition of USC and Idaho; the Vandals won the season title, and repeated the next year. They were led on the court by captain Rich Fox; "Bullet" became the head coach five years later.

At the six-team National Tournament in Indianapolis, Idaho lost 31–38 in the quarterfinal to runner-up Kalamazoo.

Idaho (16–1) was also the champion of the Northwest Conference, which was the five teams of next year's PCC Northern Division plus Whitman, Willamette, and Montana. The only loss was at Montana, on a small floor.

== Postseason result ==
Date time, TV	Opponent	Result	Record	Site (attendance) city, state
National Intercollegiate Basketball Tournament
Thu, March 9	vs. Kalamazoo	L 31–38	19–2	(10,000); Indianapolis, Indiana
*Non-conference game. (#) Tournament seedings in parentheses. All times are in Pacific time.
