= Mercer Bears men's basketball =

Basketball team representing Mercer University

2026–27 Mercer Bears men's basketball team
- University: Mercer University
- Head coach: Ryan Ridder (2nd season)
- Location: Macon, Georgia
- Arena: Hawkins Arena (capacity: 3,500)
- Conference: SoCon
- Nickname: Bears
- Colors: Black and orange
- Student section: Mercer Maniacs

NCAA Division I tournament round of 32
- 1972*, 2014

NCAA Division I tournament appearances
- 1972*, 1981, 1985, 2014

Conference tournament champions
- SIAA: 1922, 1924, 1925; TAAC/A-Sun: 1981, 1985, 2014

Conference regular-season champions
- SIAA: 1912; TAAC/A-Sun: 2003, 2013, 2014
- * at Division II level

The Mercer Bears men's basketball team represents Mercer University in Macon, Georgia, United States. The school's team competes in the Southern Conference. They are led by head coach Ryan Ridder and play their home games at Hawkins Arena. The Bears have appeared three times in the NCAA Division I men's basketball tournament, most recently in 2014. At the 2014 NCAA tournament, Mercer pulled off an upset, eliminating #3 seeded Duke from the tournament in a 78-71 victory.

== History ==
Mercer has competed in the NCAA tournament three times, including 1981 and 1985; the team lost in the first round in both years. The Bears won the 2012 CollegeInsider.com Postseason Tournament, defeating Utah State in the championship game; the victory was the first postseason championship won by a team from the Atlantic Sun Conference.

Mercer's biggest win occurred at the 2014 NCAA Division I men's basketball tournament, where they beat third-seed Duke in the second round.

=== Coaching history ===
No.	Tenure	Coach	Years	Record	Pct.
1	1973–1974	Joe Dan Gold	1	16–8	.667
2	1974–1989	Bill Bibb	15	222–194	.534
3	1989–1991	Brad Siegfried	2	9–45	.167
4	1991–1997	Bill Hodges	6	62–107	.367
5	1997–2008	Mark Slonaker	11	128–189	.404
6	2008–2019	Bob Hoffman	11	209–165	.559
7	2019–2024	Greg Gary	5	81–79	.506
8	2024–present	Ryan Ridder	2	33–32	.508
Totals		8 coaches	53 seasons	760–819	.481
Records updated through end of 2025–26 season Source; *Alum^Promoted from assistant to head coach

== Postseason ==
=== NCAA Division I tournament results ===
The Bears have appeared in three NCAA Division I Tournaments. Their combined record is 1–3. Their latest appearance was the 2014 NCAA Tournament.

Year	Round	Opponent	Result
1981	First round	Arkansas	L 67–73
1985	First round	Georgia Tech	L 58–65
2014	First Round; Second Round	Duke; Tennessee	W 78–71; L 63–83

=== NCAA Division II tournament results ===
The Bears have appeared in one NCAA Division II tournament. Their record is 0–2.

Year	Round	Opponent	Result
1972	Regional semifinals Regional 3rd-place game	Roanoke; Florida Southern	L 72–78; L 83–85

=== NIT results ===
The Bears have appeared in one National Invitation Tournament (NIT). Their record is 1–1.

Year	Round	Opponent	Result
2013	First round Second Round	Tennessee; BYU	W 75–67; L 71–90

=== CBI results ===
The Bears have appeared in the College Basketball Invitational (CBI) two times. Their combined record is 2–2.

Year	Round	Opponent	Result
2015	First round Quarterfinals	Stony Brook; Louisiana–Monroe	W 72–70; L 69–71
2018	First round Quarterfinals	Grand Canyon; North Texas	W 78–73; L 67–96

=== CIT results ===
The Bears have appeared in the CollegeInsider.com Postseason Tournament (CIT) two times. They are 5–1 and were champions in 2012.

Year	Round	Opponent	Result
2012	First round Second Round; Quarterfinals; Semifinals; Finals	Tennessee State; Georgia State; Old Dominion; Fairfield; Utah State	W 68–60; W 64–59; W 79–73; W 64–59; W 70–67
2016	First round	Coastal Carolina	L 57–65

=== NAIA Tournament results ===
The Bears have appeared in two NAIA Tournaments. Their combined record is 0–2.

Year	Round	Opponent	Result
1948	First round	Hamline	L 41–85
1954	First round	Arkansas Tech	L 72–100

=== NIBT results ===
The Bears participated in the 1922 National Intercollegiate Basketball Tournament, the first national championship tournament ever held in intercollegiate basketball. Their record is 0–1.

Year	Round	Opponent	Result
1922	Semifinals	Wabash	L 25–62

== Players ==
=== Retired numbers ===
Mercer has retired six numbers in program history.

Mercer Bears retired numbers
No.	Player	Years
4	Scott Emerson	1999–2004
7	Tommy Mixon	1951–1955
13	Glenn Wilkes	1946–1950
21	Langston Hall	2010–2014
24	Eric Chambers	1983–1985
42	Sam Mitchell	1981–1985
