= 1924–25 Idaho Vandals men's basketball team =

American college basketball season

1924–25 Idaho Vandals men's basketball
- Conference: Pacific Coast Conference
- Record: 19–8 (5–5 PCC)
- Head coach: Dave MacMillan (5th season)
- Assistant coaches: R.L. Mathews; Morris Kline
- Home arena: Armory and Gymnasium

1924–25 Pacific Coast Conference men's basketball standings
	Conf.				Overall
Team	W		L	PCT	W		L	PCT
North
Oregon Agricultural	7	–	2	.778	29	–	8	.784
Oregon	7	–	2	.778	16	–	4	.800
Washington	5	–	5	.500	14	–	7	.667
Idaho	5	–	5	.500	19	–	8	.704
Montana	2	–	6	.250	9	–	10	.474
Washington State	2	–	8	.200	18	–	11	.621
South
California †	3	–	1	.750	11	–	4	.733
Stanford	1	–	3	.250	10	–	3	.769
† Conference playoff series winner

The 1924–25 Idaho Vandals men's basketball team represented the University of Idaho during the 1924–25 NCAA college basketball season. Members of the Pacific Coast Conference, the Vandals were led by fifth-year head coach Dave MacMillan and played their home games on campus at the Armory and Gymnasium in Moscow, Idaho.

The Vandals were 19–8 overall and 5–5 in conference play.
