= 1925–26 Idaho Vandals men's basketball team =

American college basketball season

1925–26 Idaho Vandals men's basketball
- Conference: Pacific Coast Conference
- Record: 15–10 (5–4 PCC)
- Head coach: Dave MacMillan (6th season)
- Assistant coach: Morris Kline
- Home arena: Armory and Gymnasium

1925–26 Pacific Coast Conference men's basketball standings
	Conf.				Overall
Team	W		L	PCT	W		L	PCT
North
Oregon	10	–	0	1.000	18	–	4	.818
Oregon Agricultural	6	–	4	.600	18	–	6	.750
Idaho	5	–	4	.556	15	–	10	.600
Washington	5	–	5	.500	10	–	6	.625
Montana	2	–	8	.200	5	–	10	.333
Washington State	1	–	8	.111	9	–	17	.346
South
California †	5	–	0	1.000	14	–	0	1.000
Stanford	3	–	2	.600	10	–	6	.625
USC	0	–	6	.000	4	–	8	.333
† Conference playoff series winner

The 1925–26 Idaho Vandals men's basketball team represented the University of Idaho during the 1925–26 NCAA college basketball season. Members of the Pacific Coast Conference, the Vandals were led by sixth-year head coach Dave MacMillan and played their home games on campus at the Armory and Gymnasium in Moscow, Idaho.

The Vandals were 15–10 overall and 5–4 in conference play.
