= Idaho Vandals men's basketball =

Basketball team at the University of Idaho

2026–27 Idaho Vandals men's basketball team
- University: University of Idaho
- Head coach: Alex Pribble (4th season)
- Location: Moscow, Idaho
- Arena: Idaho Central Credit Union Arena (capacity: 4,200)
- Conference: Big Sky
- Nickname: Vandals
- Colors: Silver and Vandal gold

NCAA Division I tournament Sweet Sixteen
- 1982

NCAA Division I tournament appearances
- 1981, 1982, 1989, 1990, 2026

Conference tournament champions
- Big Sky: 1981, 1982, 1989, 1990, 2026

Conference regular-season champions
- Northwest: 1919; PCC: 1922, 1923; Big Sky: 1981, 1982, 1989, 1990, 1993

Uniforms
Home	Away

The Idaho Vandals men's basketball team represents the University of Idaho, located in Moscow, Idaho, in NCAA Division I basketball competition. They currently compete in the Big Sky Conference. The Vandals are coached by Alex Pribble and play home games at the Idaho Central Credit Union Arena, which opened in 2021. The Vandals have appeared five times in the NCAA Division I men's basketball tournament, most recently in 2026.

The program's two most notable seasons were in 1962–63 and 1981–82. The Vandals went 20–6 in 1963 and featured future hall of famer Gus Johnson. The 1982 team (27–3) was ranked sixth in both polls at the end of the regular season, repeated as regular season and conference tournament champions, and reached the Sweet Sixteen of the NCAA tournament.

== Post-season ==
=== NCAA tournament results ===
The Vandals have appeared in five NCAA Tournaments, with an overall record of 1–5.

Year	Seed	Round	Opponent	Result	Head coach
1981	7 W	Round of 48	(10) Pittsburgh	L 69–70 OT	Don Monson
1982	3 W	Round of 48; Round of 32; Sweet Sixteen	Bye (6) #16 Iowa (2) #4 Oregon State	— W 69–67 OT; L 42–60	Don Monson
1989	13 W	Round of 64	(4) #15 UNLV	L 56–68	Kermit Davis
1990	13 W	Round of 64	(4) #16 Louisville	L 59–78	Kermit Davis
2026	15 S	Round of 64	(2) #5 Houston	L 47–78	Alex Pribble

=== NIT results ===
Idaho has one National Invitation Tournament appearance (1983) and lost in the first round;
it was the first NIT invitation for the Big Sky Conference.

Year	Round	Opponent	Result	Head coach
1983	First Round	at Oregon State	L 59–77	Don Monson

=== CIT results ===
The Vandals have participated in four CollegeInsider.com Tournaments,
and their combined record is 3–4.

Year	Round	Opponent	Result	Head coach
2009	First Round; Quarterfinals	Drake at Pacific	W 69–67; L 59–69	Don Verlin
2011	First Round	at San Francisco	L 73–81	Don Verlin
2012	First Round; Second Round	UC Santa Barbara at Utah State	W 86–83; L 56–76	Don Verlin
2017	First Round; Second Round	Stephen F. Austin at Texas State	W 73–50; L 55–64	Don Verlin

=== CBI results ===
The Vandals have participated in the one College Basketball Invitational (CBI). Their record is 0–1.

Year	Round	Opponent	Result	Head coach
2016	First Round	at Seattle	L 63–68	Don Verlin

=== Other postseason ===
Idaho also participated in the very first national championship tournament ever held in intercollegiate basketball, the 1922 National Intercollegiate Basketball Tournament, where they lost in the quarterfinals to Kalamazoo College.

== Individual records ==
=== Notable players ===
- Kaniel Dickens – 50th overall selection in 2000 NBA draft
- Gus Johnson – 10th overall selection in 1963 NBA draft – dominant NBA power forward in the 1960s – Basketball Hall of Fame (2010)
- Orlando Lightfoot all-time leading scorer of the Vandals with 2,102 points.

=== Retired numbers ===
No.	Player	Pos.	Career	No. retired
6	Gary Simmons	G	1955–58	Dec. 5, 1999
43	Gus Johnson	F	1962–63	Jan. 30, 1987

=== Season-by-season records ===
Record table
Season	Team	Overall	Conference	Standing	Postseason
John G. Griffith (Independent) (1905–1907)
1905–06	John G. Griffith	3–2			
1906–07	John G. Griffith	2–2			
George Wyman (Independent) (1907–1908)
1907–08	George Wyman	2–5			
George Wyman:		2–5			
John S. Grogan (Northwest Conference) (1908–1910)
1908–09	John S. Grogan	5–9			
1909–10	John S. Grogan	5–8			
John S. Grogan:		10–17			
John G. Griffith (Northwest Conference) (1910–1915)
1910–11	John G. Griffith	6–3			
1911–12	John G. Griffith	1–12			
1912–13	John G. Griffith	2–14			
1913–14	John G. Griffith	10–5			
1914–15	John G. Griffith	5–9			
John G. Griffith:		29–47			
Charles Rademacher (Northwest Conference) (1915–1916)
1915–16	Charles Rademacher	6–3			
Charles Rademacher:		1–11			
Hec Edmundson (Northwest Conference) (1916–1918)
1916–17	Hec Edmundson	8–8			
1917–18	Hec Edmundson	12–1		1st	
Hec Edmundson:		20–9			
W.C. Bleamaster (Northwest Conference) (1918–1919)
1918–19	W.C. Bleamaster	12–2	10–2	1st	
W.C. Bleamaster:		12–2	10–2		
Ralph Hutchinson (Northwest Conference) (1919–1920)
1919–20	Ralph Hutchinson	12–2			
Ralph Hutchinson:		12–2			
Dave MacMillan (Northwest Conference / PCC) (1920–1927)
1920–21	Dave MacMillan	15–4			
1921–22	Dave MacMillan	19–2	7–0	1st	National – 1st Round
1922–23	Dave MacMillan	16–3	5–3	T-1st (N. div.)	
1923–24	Dave MacMillan	12–8	4–6	4th (N. div.)	
1924–25	Dave MacMillan	12–7	5–5	T-3rd (N. div.)	
1925–26	Dave MacMillan	9–7	5–4	3rd (N. div.)	
1926–27	Dave MacMillan	18–5	7–3	T-2nd (N. div.)	
Dave MacMillan:		101–36	33–21		
Richard Fox (PCC) (1927–1936)
1927–28	Richard Fox	11–8	4–6	3rd (N. div.)	
1928–29	Richard Fox	8–10	6–4	2nd (N. div.)	
1929–30	Richard Fox	6–18	4–12	5th (N. div.)	
1930–31	Richard Fox	3–19	1–15	5th (N. div.)	
1931–32	Richard Fox	8–16	2–14	5th (N. div.)	
1932–33	Richard Fox	16–9	8–8	T-3rd (N. div.)	
1933–34	Richard Fox	13–13	4–12	5th (N. div.)	
1934–35	Richard Fox	10–16	4–12	5th (N. div.)	
1935–36	Richard Fox	10–15	2–14	5th (N. div.)	
Richard A. Fox:		85–124	35–97		
Forrest Twogood (PCC) (1936–1941)
1936–37	Forrest Twogood	7–19	2–14	5th (N. div.)	
1937–38	Forrest Twogood	24–11	12–8	T-3rd (N. div.)	
1938–39	Forrest Twogood	12–19	1–15	5th (N. div.)	
1939–40	Forrest Twogood	10–15	3–13	5th (N. div.)	
1940–41	Forrest Twogood	13–15	4–12	5th (N. div.)	
Forrest Twogood:		66–79	22–62		
Guy Wicks (PCC) (1941–1942)
1941–42	Guy Wicks	12–16	3–13	5th (N. div)	
J.A. "Babe" Brown (PCC) (1942–1946)
1942–43	J.A. "Babe" Brown	14–20	1–15	5th (N. div.)	
1943–44	J.A. "Babe" Brown	7–16	5–11	3rd (N. div.)	
1944–45	J.A. "Babe" Brown	11–19	3–13	5th (N. div.)	
1945–46	J.A. "Babe" Brown	19–8	11–5	1st (N. div.)	PCC Finals
J.A. "Babe" Brown:		51–63	20–44		
Guy Wicks (PCC) (1946–1947)
1946–47	Guy Wicks	4–24	1–15	5th (N. div)	
Guy Wicks:		16–40	4–28		
Charles Finley (PCC) (1947–1954)
1947–48	Charles Finley	12–18	3–13	5th (N. div.)	
1948–49	Charles Finley	13–15	7–9	4th (N. div.)	
1949–50	Charles Finley	14–16	7–9	4th (N. div.)	
1950–51	Charles Finley	14–13	6–10	4th (N. div.)	
1951–52	Charles Finley	19–11	9–7	2nd (N. div.)	
1952–53	Charles Finley	14–11	8–8	2nd (N. div.)	
1953–54	Charles Finley	15–8	9–7	2nd (N. div.)	
Charles Finley:		101–92	49–63		
Harlan Hodges (PCC) (1954–1959)
1954–55	Harlan Hodges	8–18	5–11	5th (N. div.)	
1955–56	Harlan Hodges	6–19	4–12	8th	
1956–57	Harlan Hodges	10–16	4–12	7th	
1957–58	Harlan Hodges	17–9	9–7	4th	
1958–59	Harlan Hodges	11–15	6–10	7th	
Harlan Hodges:		52–77	28–52		
Dave Strack (Independent) (1959–1960)
1959–60	Dave Strack	11–15			
Dave Strack:		11–15			
Joe Cipriano (Independent) (1960–1963)
1960–61	Joe Cipriano	10–16			
1961–62	Joe Cipriano	13–13			
1962–63	Joe Cipriano	20–6			
Joe Cipriano:		43–35			
Jim Goddard (Big Sky) (1963–1966)
1963–64	Jim Goddard	7–19	4–6	5th	
1964–65	Jim Goddard	6–19	4–6	4th	
1965–66	Jim Goddard	12–14	2–8	5th	
Jim Goddard:		25–52	10–20		
Wayne Anderson (Big Sky) (1966–1974)
1966–67	Wayne Anderson	13–10	5–5	3rd	
1967–68	Wayne Anderson	15–11	9–6	2nd	
1968–69	Wayne Anderson	11–15	6–9	3rd	
1969–70	Wayne Anderson	10–15	6–9	4th	
1970–71	Wayne Anderson	14–12	8–6	2nd	
1971–72	Wayne Anderson	5–20	2–12	8th	
1972–73	Wayne Anderson	7–19	3–11	7th	
1973–74	Wayne Anderson	12–14	5–9	6th	
Wayne Anderson:		87–116	44–67		
Jim Jarvis (Big Sky) (1974–1978)
1974–75	Jim Jarvis	10–16	4–10	8th	
1975–76	Jim Jarvis	7–19	3–11	8th	
1976–77	Jim Jarvis	5–21	3–11	8th	
1977–78	Jim Jarvis	4–22	1–13	8th	
Jim Jarvis:		26–78	11–45		
Don Monson (Big Sky) (1978–1983)
1978–79	Don Monson	11–15	4–10	8th	
1979–80	Don Monson	17–10	9–5	2nd	
1980–81	Don Monson	25–4	12–2	1st	NCAA 1st Round
1981–82	Don Monson	27–3	13–1	1st	NCAA Sweet 16
1982–83	Don Monson	20–9	9–5	T-3rd	NIT 1st Round
Don Monson:		100–41	47–23		
Bill Trumbo (Big Sky) (1983–1986)
1983–84	Bill Trumbo	9–19	4–10	8th	
1984–85	Bill Trumbo	8–22	1–13	8th	
1985–86	Bill Trumbo	10–18	4–10	8th	
Bill Trumbo:		27–59	9–33		
Tim Floyd (Big Sky) (1986–1988)
1986–87	Tim Floyd	16–14	6–10	6th	
1987–88	Tim Floyd	19–11	11–6	2nd	
Tim Floyd:		35–25	16–14		
Kermit Davis (Big Sky) (1988–1990)
1988–89	Kermit Davis	25–6	13–3	1st	NCAA 1st Round
1989–90	Kermit Davis	25–6	13–3	1st	NCAA 1st Round
Larry Eustachy (Big Sky) (1990–1993)
1990–91	Larry Eustachy	19–11	11–5	3rd	
1991–92	Larry Eustachy	18–14	10–6	3rd	
1992–93	Larry Eustachy	24–8	11–3	1st	
Larry Eustachy:		61–33	32–14		
Joe Cravens (Big Sky) (1993–1996)
1993–94	Joe Cravens	18–10	9–5	3rd	
1994–95	Joe Cravens	12–15	6–8	6th	
1995–96	Joe Cravens	12–16	5–9	6th	
Joe Cravens:		42–41	20–22		
Kermit Davis (Big West) (1996–1997)
1996–97	Kermit Davis	13–17	5–11	5th (E. div.)	
Kermit Davis:		63–29	31–17		
David Farrar (Big West) (1997–2001)
1997–98	David Farrar	15–12	9–7	T-3rd (E. div.)	
1998–99	David Farrar	16–11	11–5	3rd (E. div.)	
1999–00	David Farrar	12–17	6–10	3rd (E. div.)	
2000–01	David Farrar	6–21	3–13	7th	
David Farrar:		49–61	29–35		
Leonard Perry (Big West) (2001–2005)
2001–02	Leonard Perry	9–19	6–12	8th	
2002–03	Leonard Perry	13–15	9–9	5th	
2003–04	Leonard Perry	14–16	9–9	4th	
2004–05	Leonard Perry	8–22	6–12	8th	
Leonard Perry (WAC) (2005–2006)
2005–06	Leonard Perry	4–25	1–15	9th	
Leonard Perry:		48–97	31–57		
George Pfeifer (WAC) (2006–2008)
2006–07	George Pfeifer	4–27	1–15	9th	
2007–08	George Pfeifer	8–21	5–11	6th	
George Pfeifer:		12–48	6–26		
Don Verlin (WAC) (2008–2014)
2008–09	Don Verlin	17–16	9–7	T-3rd	CIT Quarterfinals
2009–10	Don Verlin	15–16	6–10	T-6th	
2010–11	Don Verlin	18–14	9–7	T-3rd	CIT First Round
2011–12	Don Verlin	19–14	9–5	3rd	CIT Second Round
2012–13	Don Verlin	12–18	7–11	6th	
2013–14	Don Verlin	16–17	7–9	T-5th	
Don Verlin (Big Sky) (2014–2019)
2014–15	Don Verlin	13–17	8–10	T-7th	
2015–16	Don Verlin	21–13	12–6	3rd	CBI First Round
2016–17	Don Verlin	19–14	12–6	T-3rd	CIT Second Round
2017–18	Don Verlin	22–9	14–4	2nd	
2018–19	Don Verlin	5–27	2–18	11th	
Don Verlin:		177–176	95–93		
Total:		1363–1509			
National champion Postseason invitational champion Conference regular season champion Conference regular season and conference tournament champion Division regular season champion Division regular season and conference tournament champion Conference tournament champion
