= Richard Fox (coach) =

American basketball coach (1899–1960)

Biographical details
- Born: 1899; Nebraska, U.S. (?)
- Died: December 9, 1960 (aged 61); Cottonwood, Idaho, U.S.
- Education: University of Idaho, 1922

Coaching career (HC unless noted)

Basketball
- 1927–1936: Idaho

Baseball
- 1928–1936: Idaho

Football
- 1927–1935: Idaho (asst.)

Richard Anthony Fox (1899 – December 9, 1960) was an American college basketball coach at the University of Idaho in Moscow. He led the Vandals for nine seasons (1927–1936) and was also the head baseball coach and an assistant in football.

== Career ==
From Nezperce High School in Lewis County, Idaho, Fox played varsity basketball at Idaho in the early 1920s. During his final two seasons in 1922 and 1923, "Bullet" was team captain: Idaho made its debut in the Pacific Coast Conference and won consecutive titles. Fox was also a catcher on the baseball team, and had played football as a freshman.

After college, Fox coached multiple sports at the high school level, in nearby Potlatch and then three years at Pocatello in southeastern Idaho. He led his undefeated PHS Indians to the state title in basketball in 1927 at Moscow; a month later, UI head coach Dave MacMillan accepted the head coaching job at the University of Minnesota, and Fox was hired to succeed his mentor at his alma mater.

Prior to his second season as head coach of the Vandals, the Memorial Gymnasium opened in November 1928. Fox coached at Idaho for nine years, announced his resignation in June 1936, and entered the private sector. His successor was Forrest Twogood, an assistant coach at USC in Los Angeles.

== Death and legacy ==
Fox died in Cottonwood at age 61 from a heart attack; he is buried next to his wife Mary (1899–1972) at the city cemetery in Moscow.

He was a charter member of the Vandal Hall of Fame, inducted in 2008.

The Rich and Mary Fox Memorial Scholarship at was established in 1964 and is awarded to the senior Vandal student-athlete with the highest cumulative grade point average; the athlete must have represented UI creditably in any intercollegiate sport.

== Head coaching record ==
=== Basketball ===
Record table
Season	Team	Overall	Conference	Standing	Postseason
Idaho Vandals (Pacific Coast Conference) (1927–1936)
1927–28	Idaho	11–8	4–6	3rd (North)	
1928–29	Idaho	8–10	6–4	2nd (North)	
1929–30	Idaho	6–18	4–12	5th (North)	
1930–31	Idaho	3–19	1–15	5th (North)	
1931–32	Idaho	8–16	2–14	5th (North)	
1932–33	Idaho	16–9	8–8	T–3rd (North)	
1933–34	Idaho	13–13	4–12	5th (North)	
1934–35	Idaho	10–16	4–12	5th (North)	
1935–36	Idaho	10–15	2–14	5th (North)	
Idaho:		85–124 (.407)	35–97 (.265)		
Total:		85–124 (.407)			
