= List of Bethune–Cookman Wildcats men's basketball head coaches =

The following is a list of Bethune–Cookman Wildcats men's basketball head coaches. The Wildcats have had 13 coaches in their 82-season history.

Bethune–Cookman's current head coach is Reggie Theus. He was hired in July 2021 to replace Ryan Ridder, who left to take the same position at UT Martin.

No.	Tenure	Coach	Years	Record	Pct.
1	1929–1931	W. A. Busch	2	2–4	.333
2	1941–1947 (Note: Bethune–Cookman did not field teams for the 1942–43 or 1943–44 seasons.) (Note: Statistics for the 1945–46 season are missing; Johnson was head coach, but his record is effectively counted here as 0–0.)	Joe Johnson	4	18–3	.857
3	1947–1956	Bunky Matthews	9	90–47	.657
4	1956–1957; 1958–1961	Raymon Thornton	4	43–34	.558
5	1957–1958	Lymeal McClain	1	13–8	.619
6	1961–1966; 1967–1993	Cy McClairen	31	396–436	.476
7	1966–1967	Raymond McDougle	1	19–10	.655
8	1993–1997	Tony Sheals	4	45–65	.409
9	1997–2002 (Note: Horace Broadnax resigned as head coach on February 1, 2002. Clifford Reed was named head coach for the remainder of the season.)	Horace Broadnax	5	42–89	.321
10	2002–2011 (Note: Clifford Reed served as interim head coach after Horace Broadnax's resignation, then was hired to the job full-time in April 2002.)	Clifford Reed	10	125–166	.430
11	2011–2017	Gravelle Craig	6	74–123	.376
12	2017–2021 (Note: Bethune–Cookman's 2020–21 season was cancelled due to the COVID-19 pandemic. Ridder stayed on as head coach through that season, and left after the 2020–21 season had completed)	Ryan Ridder	3	48–45	.516
13	2021–present	Reggie Theus	2	21–41	.339
Totals		13 coaches	82 seasons	918–1,057	.465
Records updated through end of 2022–23 season Source
