= 1921–22 Washington State Cougars men's basketball team =

American college basketball season

1921–22 Washington State Cougars men's basketball
- Conference: Pacific Coast Conference
- Record: 9–17 (4–11 PCC)
- Head coach: Fred Bohler (14th season)

1921–22 Pacific Coast Conference men's basketball standings
	Conf.				Overall
Team	W		L	PCT	W		L	PCT
Idaho	7	–	0	1.000	19	–	2	.905
Oregon Agricultural	10	–	2	.833	21	–	2	.913
California	10	–	4	.714	19	–	6	.760
Washington	11	–	5	.688	13	–	5	.722
Stanford	4	–	6	.400	8	–	7	.533
Washington State	4	–	11	.267	9	–	17	.346
USC	1	–	3	.250	7	–	5	.583
Oregon	0	–	16	.000	7	–	24	.226
As of 1922

The 1921–22 Washington State Cougars men's basketball team represented Washington State College for the 1921–22 college basketball season. Led by fourteenth-year head coach Fred Bohler, the Cougars were members of the Pacific Coast Conference and played their home games on campus in Pullman, Washington.

The Cougars were 9–17 overall in the regular season and 4–11 in conference play, sixth in the standings.

The PCC became an eight-team league this year with the addition of USC and Idaho; the Vandals won the season title, and repeated the next year.
