= 1932–33 UCLA Bruins men's basketball team =

American college basketball season

1932–33 UCLA Bruins men's basketball
- Conference: Pacific Coast Conference
- South
- Record: 10–11 (1–10 PCC)
- Head coach: Caddy Works (12th season)
- Assistant coaches: Silas Gibbs; Dick Linthicum

1932–33 Pacific Coast Conference men's basketball standings
| | Conf. | | | | Overall |
| Team | W | | L | PCT | W | | L | PCT |
|---|---|---|---|---|---|---|---|---|
North
| Oregon State † | 12 | – | 4 | .750 | 21 | – | 6 | .778 |
| Washington | 10 | – | 6 | .625 | 22 | – | 6 | .786 |
| Washington State | 8 | – | 8 | .500 | 17 | – | 8 | .680 |
| Idaho | 8 | – | 8 | .500 | 20 | – | 9 | .690 |
| Oregon | 2 | – | 14 | .125 | 8 | – | 19 | .296 |
South
| USC | 10 | – | 1 | .909 | 18 | – | 5 | .783 |
| California | 8 | – | 3 | .727 | 18 | – | 7 | .720 |
| Stanford | 3 | – | 8 | .273 | 9 | – | 18 | .333 |
| UCLA | 1 | – | 10 | .091 | 10 | – | 11 | .476 |
† Conference playoff series winner

The 1932–33 UCLA Bruins men's basketball team represented the University of California, Los Angeles during the 1932–33 NCAA men's basketball season and were members of the Pacific Coast Conference. The Bruins were led by 12th year head coach Caddy Works. They finished the regular season with a record of 10–11 and were fourth in the southern division with a record of 1–10.

== Previous season ==
The Bruins finished the regular season with a record of 9–6 and were third in the southern division with a record of 4–5.

== Roster ==
1932–33 UCLA Bruins men's basketball team
Players
Coaches

| Pos. | # | Name | Height | Weight | Year | Hometown |
|---|---|---|---|---|---|---|
| G | 25 | William Athey | — | — |
| C | | Carson Binkley | — | — | Sr |
| F | 28 | Charles Church | — | — |
| C | 44 | Louis Eilers | — | — |
| F | | Cordner Gibson | — | — |
| | 23 | George Koppe | — | — |
| | | Ted Lemcke (C) | — | — |
| C | 27 | Bill Maxwell | — | — |
| F | 29 | Donald Piper | — | — | Jr |
| F | | Kenneth Springer | — | — |
| G | 36 | John Wells | — | — |

Head coach

Caddy Works

Assistant coach(es)

- Silas Gibbs (UCLA)
- Dick Linthicum (UCLA)

Legend

- (C) Team captain
- (S) Suspended
- (I) Ineligible
- (W) Walk-on
- Injured
- Current redshirt

Roster
Last update: 30 January 2018

== Schedule ==
| Date time, TV | Rank^{#} | Opponent^{#} | Result | Record | Site city, state |
Regular Season
| * | | La Verne | W 41–34 | 1–0 | Men's Gym; Los Angeles, CA |
| * | | Whittier | W 68–36 | 2–0 | Men's Gym; Los Angeles, CA |
| * | | Hollywood Athletic Club | W 82–36 | 3–0 | Men's Gym; Los Angeles, CA |
| * | | Pasadena Majors | L 33–41 | 3–1 | Men's Gym; Los Angeles, CA |
| * | | Los Angeles Junior College | W 32–21 | 4–1 | Men's Gym; Los Angeles, CA |
| * | | Hancock Oilers | W 37–30 | 5–1 | Men's Gym; Los Angeles, CA |
| * | | Nevada | W 50–26 | 6–1 | Men's Gym; Los Angeles, CA |
| * | | Nevada | W 44–29 | 7–1 | Men's Gym; Los Angeles, CA |
| * | | Utah State | W 54–39 | 8–1 | Men's Gym; Los Angeles, CA |
| * | | Santa Clara | W 41–22 | 9–1 | Men's Gym; Los Angeles, CA |
| | | at California | L 37–40 | 9–2 (0–1) | Harmon Gym; Berkeley, CA |
| | | at California | L 29–33 | 9–3 (0–2) | Harmon Gym; Berkeley, CA |
| | | at USC | L 27–49 | 9–4 (0–3) | Shrine Auditorium; Los Angeles, CA |
| | | at Stanford | W 44–36 | 10–4 (1–4) | Stanford Pavilion; Stanford, CA |
| | | at Stanford | L 38–41 | 10–5 (1–4) | Stanford Pavilion; Stanford, CA |
| | | USC | L 28–37 | 10–6 (1–5) | Men's Gym; Los Angeles, CA |
| | | California | L 28–37 | 10–7 (1–6) | Men's Gym; Los Angeles, CA |
| | | California | L 36–37 | 10–8 (1–7) | Men's Gym; Los Angeles, CA |
| | | USC | L 18–44 | 10–9 (1–8) | Men's Gym; Los Angeles, CA |
| | | Stanford | L 21–46 | 10–10 (1–9) | Men's Gym; Los Angeles, CA |
| | | Stanford | L 35–41 | 10–11 (1–10) | Men's Gym; Los Angeles, CA |
*Non-conference game. ^{#}Rankings from AP Poll. (#) Tournament seedings in parentheses. All times are in Pacific Time.
