= 1922–23 Washington State Cougars men's basketball team =

American college basketball season

1922–23 Washington State Cougars men's basketball
- Conference: Pacific Coast Conference
- Record: 16–10 (4–4 PCC)
- Head coach: Fred Bohler (15th season)

1922–23 Pacific Coast Conference men's basketball standings
	Conf.				Overall
Team	W		L	PCT	W		L	PCT
North
Idaho †	5	–	3	.625	27	–	3	.900
Washington	5	–	3	.625	12	–	4	.750
Oregon Agricultural	4	–	4	.500	19	–	7	.731
Washington State	4	–	4	.500	16	–	10	.615
Oregon	2	–	6	.250	15	–	10	.600
South
California	5	–	3	.625	12	–	6	.667
Stanford	5	–	3	.625	12	–	4	.750
USC	2	–	6	.250	5	–	12	.294
† Conference playoff series winner As of 1923

The 1922–23 Washington State Cougars men's basketball team represented Washington State College for the 1922–23 college basketball season. Led by fifteenth-year head coach Fred Bohler, the Cougars were members of the Pacific Coast Conference and played their home games on campus in Pullman, Washington.

The Cougars were 16–10 overall in the regular season and 4–4 in conference play, tied for third in the Northern division.
