= 1935–36 UCLA Bruins men's basketball team =

American college basketball season

1935–36 UCLA Bruins men's basketball
- Conference: Pacific Coast Conference
- South
- Record: 10–13 (2–10 PCC)
- Head coach: Caddy Works (15th season)
- Assistant coaches: Wilbur Johns; Silas Gibbs; Dick Linthicum

1935–36 Pacific Coast Conference men's basketball standings
	Conf.				Overall
Team	W		L	PCT	W		L	PCT
North
Washington	13	–	3	.813	25	–	7	.781
Oregon State	10	–	6	.625	16	–	9	.640
Washington State	8	–	8	.500	22	–	8	.733
Oregon	7	–	9	.438	20	–	11	.645
Idaho	2	–	14	.125	12	–	15	.444
South
Stanford †	8	–	4	.667	22	–	7	.759
USC	8	–	4	.667	14	–	12	.538
California	6	–	6	.500	13	–	16	.448
UCLA	2	–	10	.167	10	–	13	.435
† Conference playoff series winner

The 1935–36 UCLA Bruins men's basketball team represented the University of California, Los Angeles during the 1935–36 NCAA men's basketball season and were members of the Pacific Coast Conference. The Bruins were led by 15th year head coach Caddy Works. They finished the regular season with a record of 10–13 and were fourth in the southern division with a record of 2–10.

== Previous season ==
The Bruins finished the regular season with a record of 11–12 and were third in the southern division with a record of 4–8.

== Roster ==
1935–36 UCLA Bruins men's basketball team
Players
Coaches

Pos.	#	Name	Height	Weight	Year	Hometown
F	4	Orv Abbleby	—	—	Jr
G	18	Don Ashen (C)	—	—	Sr
C	22	John Ball	—	—	Jr
		Gordon Barnhill	—	—	So
	5	Clem Clements	—	—	So
	13	Les Ewing	—	—	So
F	24	Chet Freeze	—	—	So
G	23	Horace Haight	—	—	Sr
	21	Kenneth Lueke	—	—	Jr
G	27	Ralph McFadden	—	—	Sr
	20	Clem Melancon	—	—	Sr
	28	Paul Peck	—	—	Jr
		George Robinson	—	—	So
		William Robinson	—	—	Jr
	29	Jack Seiter	—	—	So
	30	Alex Wilicski	—	—	Sr

Head coach

Caddy Works

Assistant coach(es)

- Wilbur Johns (UCLA)
- Silas Gibbs (UCLA)
- Dick Linthicum (UCLA)

Legend

- (C) Team captain
- (S) Suspended
- (I) Ineligible
- (W) Walk-on
- Injured
- Current redshirt

Roster
Last update: 30 January 2018

== Schedule ==
Date time, TV	Rank^{#}	Opponent^{#}	Result	Record	Site city, state
Regular Season
*		Baxter Club Glendale	W 36–28	1–0	Men's Gym; Los Angeles, CA
*		Los Angeles Junior College	W 30–22	2–0	Men's Gym; Los Angeles, CA
*		Glendale Junior College	W 50–24	3–0	Men's Gym; Los Angeles, CA
*		Universal Pictures	W 23–20	4–0	Men's Gym; Los Angeles, CA
*		at Pacific	L 28–31	4–1	Stockton, CA
*		at San Jose State	W 30–22	5–1	Spartan Gym; San Jose, CA
*		at Santa Clara	W 42–33	6–1	Santa Clara, CA
*		Utah State	L 32–43	6–2	Men's Gym; Los Angeles, CA
*		Joe E. Brown All-Stars	W 36–25	7–2	Men's Gym; Los Angeles, CA
*		Utah State	W 40–36	8–2	Men's Gym; Los Angeles, CA
*		Utah State	L 34–44	8–3	Men's Gym; Los Angeles, CA
		at Stanford	L 30–44	8–4 (0–1)	Stanford Pavilion; Stanford, CA
		at Stanford	W 44–37	9–4 (1–1)	Stanford Pavilion; Stanford, CA
		at USC	L 36–38	9–5 (1–2)	Shrine Auditorium; Los Angeles, CA
		at California	L 33–35	9–6 (1–3)	Men's Gym; Berkeley, CA
		at California	L 26–30	9–7 (1–4)	Men's Gym; Berkeley, CA
		USC	L 24–32	9–8 (1–5)	Men's Gym; Los Angeles, CA
		Stanford	L 32–45	9–9 (1–6)	Men's Gym; Los Angeles, CA
		Stanford	L 35–39	9–10 (1–7)	Men's Gym; Los Angeles, CA
		USC	L 32–36	9–11 (1–8)	Men's Gym; Los Angeles, CA
		California	L 32–34	9–12 (1–9)	Men's Gym; Los Angeles, CA
		California	W 32–28	10–12 (2–9)	Men's Gym; Los Angeles, CA
		USC	L 28–55	10–13 (2–10)	Shrine Auditorium; Los Angeles, CA
*Non-conference game. ^{#}Rankings from AP Poll. (#) Tournament seedings in parentheses. All times are in Pacific Time.
