= 1935–36 Washington State Cougars men's basketball team =

American college basketball season

1935–36 Washington State Cougars men's basketball
- Conference: Pacific Coast Conference
- Record: 22–8 (8–8 PCC)
- Head coach: Jack Friel (8th season)
- Home arena: WSC Gymnasium

1935–36 Pacific Coast Conference men's basketball standings
	Conf.				Overall
Team	W		L	PCT	W		L	PCT
North
Washington	13	–	3	.813	25	–	7	.781
Oregon State	10	–	6	.625	16	–	9	.640
Washington State	8	–	8	.500	22	–	8	.733
Oregon	7	–	9	.438	20	–	11	.645
Idaho	2	–	14	.125	12	–	15	.444
South
Stanford †	8	–	4	.667	22	–	7	.759
USC	8	–	4	.667	14	–	12	.538
California	6	–	6	.500	13	–	16	.448
UCLA	2	–	10	.167	10	–	13	.435
† Conference playoff series winner

The 1935–36 Washington State Cougars men's basketball team represented Washington State College for the 1935–36 college basketball season. Led by eighth-year head coach Jack Friel, the Cougars were members of the Pacific Coast Conference and played their home games on campus at WSC Gymnasium in Pullman, Washington.

The Cougars were 22–8 overall in the regular season and 8–8 in conference play, third in the Northern division.

The National Invitation Tournament (NIT) debuted two years later, and the NCAA tournament in 1939.
