= 1924–25 Washington State Cougars men's basketball team =

American college basketball season

1924–25 Washington State Cougars men's basketball
- Conference: Pacific Coast Conference
- Record: 18–11 (2–8 PCC)
- Head coach: Fred Bohler (17th season)

1924–25 Pacific Coast Conference men's basketball standings
	Conf.				Overall
Team	W		L	PCT	W		L	PCT
North
Oregon Agricultural	7	–	2	.778	29	–	8	.784
Oregon	7	–	2	.778	16	–	4	.800
Washington	5	–	5	.500	14	–	7	.667
Idaho	5	–	5	.500	19	–	8	.704
Montana	2	–	6	.250	9	–	10	.474
Washington State	2	–	8	.200	18	–	11	.621
South
California †	3	–	1	.750	11	–	4	.733
Stanford	1	–	3	.250	10	–	3	.769
† Conference playoff series winner

The 1924–25 Washington State Cougars men's basketball team represented Washington State College for the 1924–25 college basketball season. Led by seventeenth-year head coach Fred Bohler, the Cougars were members of the Pacific Coast Conference and played their home games on campus in Pullman, Washington.

The Cougars were 18–11 overall in the regular season and 2–8 in conference play, last in the Northern division.
