= 1934–35 Idaho Vandals men's basketball team =

American college basketball season

1934–35 Idaho Vandals men's basketball
- Conference: Pacific Coast Conference
- Record: 11–16 (4–12 PCC)
- Head coach: Rich Fox (8th season)
- Assistant coach: Glenn Jacoby
- Home arena: Memorial Gymnasium

1934–35 Pacific Coast Conference men's basketball standings
	Conf.				Overall
Team	W		L	PCT	W		L	PCT
North
Oregon State	12	–	4	.750	19	–	9	.679
Washington	11	–	5	.688	16	–	8	.667
Oregon	7	–	9	.438	16	–	12	.571
Washington State	6	–	10	.375	12	–	12	.500
Idaho	4	–	12	.250	11	–	16	.407
South
USC †	11	–	1	.917	20	–	6	.769
California	5	–	7	.417	11	–	14	.440
Stanford	4	–	8	.333	9	–	18	.333
UCLA	4	–	8	.333	11	–	12	.478
† Conference playoff series winner

The 1934–35 Idaho Vandals men's basketball team represented the University of Idaho during the 1934–35 NCAA college basketball season. Members of the Pacific Coast Conference, the Vandals were led by eighth-year head coach Rich Fox and played their home games on campus at Memorial Gymnasium in Moscow, Idaho.

The Vandals were 11–16 overall and 4–12 in conference play.
