= 1932–33 Washington State Cougars men's basketball team =

American college basketball season

1932–33 Washington State Cougars men's basketball
- Conference: Pacific Coast Conference
- Record: 14–11 (6–10 PCC)
- Head coach: Jack Friel (5th season)
- Home arena: WSC Gymnasium

1932–33 Pacific Coast Conference men's basketball standings
	Conf.				Overall
Team	W		L	PCT	W		L	PCT
North
Oregon State †	12	–	4	.750	21	–	6	.778
Washington	10	–	6	.625	22	–	6	.786
Washington State	8	–	8	.500	17	–	8	.680
Idaho	8	–	8	.500	20	–	9	.690
Oregon	2	–	14	.125	8	–	19	.296
South
USC	10	–	1	.909	18	–	5	.783
California	8	–	3	.727	18	–	7	.720
Stanford	3	–	8	.273	9	–	18	.333
UCLA	1	–	10	.091	10	–	11	.476
† Conference playoff series winner

The 1932–33 Washington State Cougars men's basketball team represented Washington State College for the 1932–33 college basketball season. Led by fifth-year head coach Jack Friel, the Cougars were members of the Pacific Coast Conference and played their home games on campus at WSC Gymnasium in Pullman, Washington.

The Cougars were 14–11 overall in the regular season and 6–10 in conference play, tied for third in the Northern division.

The National Invitation Tournament (NIT) debuted in 1938, and the NCAA tournament in 1939.
