= 1929–30 Idaho Vandals men's basketball team =

American college basketball season

1929–30 Idaho Vandals men's basketball
- Conference: Pacific Coast Conference
- Record: 7–18 (2–12 PCC)
- Head coach: Rich Fox (3rd season)
- Assistant coach: Glenn Jacoby
- Home arena: Memorial Gymnasium

1929–30 Pacific Coast Conference men's basketball standings
	Conf.				Overall
Team	W		L	PCT	W		L	PCT
North
Washington	12	–	4	.750	21	–	7	.750
Washington State	9	–	7	.563	14	–	12	.538
Oregon	8	–	8	.500	14	–	12	.538
Oregon State	7	–	9	.438	14	–	13	.519
Idaho	4	–	12	.250	7	–	18	.280
South
USC †	7	–	2	.778	15	–	5	.750
California	6	–	3	.667	9	–	8	.529
UCLA	3	–	6	.333	14	–	8	.636
Stanford	2	–	7	.222	10	–	9	.526
† Conference playoff series winner

The 1929–30 Idaho Vandals men's basketball team represented the University of Idaho during the 1929–30 NCAA college basketball season. Members of the Pacific Coast Conference, the Vandals were led by third-year head coach Rich Fox and played their home games on campus at Memorial Gymnasium in Moscow, Idaho.

The Vandals were 7–18 overall and 4–12 in conference play.
