= Wabash Little Giants =

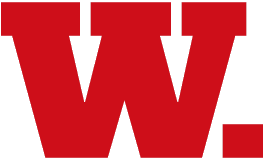
- University: Wabash College
- Conference: North Coast Athletic Conference; Midwest Collegiate Volleyball League (volleyball)
- NCAA: Division III
- Athletic director: Matt Tanney
- Location: Crawfordsville, Indiana
- Varsity teams: 12
- Football stadium: Byron P. Hollett Little Giant Stadium
- Basketball arena: Chadwick Court
- Baseball stadium: Goodrich Ballpark
- Soccer stadium: Mud Hollow Field
- Lacrosse stadium: Mud Hollow Field
- Mascot: Wally Wabash
- Nickname: Little Giants
- Fight song: "Old Wabash"
- Colors: Scarlet
- Website: sports.wabash.edu

The Wabash Little Giants are the intercollegiate athletics teams that represent Wabash College, a small private school for men in Crawfordsville, Indiana, United States. The college belongs to the National Collegiate Athletic Association and participates in Division III sports. The Little Giants compete as members of the North Coast Athletic Conference (NCAC). Despite the college's small enrollment and that it is "not a jock school", the Little Giants have had success in several sports. The most popular among Wabash fans are football and swimming. The Little Giants also have a well-respected cross-country team. In football, Wabash has an important rivalry with DePauw University, and each season they meet for the Monon Bell Classic. Wabash and DePauw compete annually to win the trophy, the Monon Bell, and as of 2015 the two teams have played 122 games in the series with Wabash holding a 60-53-9 advantage.

The Little Giants currently sponsor 12 varsity teams. Volleyball is the newest sport, having been added for the 2021 season (2020–21 school year); since the NCAC only sponsors volleyball for women, that team plays in the single-sport Midwest Collegiate Volleyball League.

== Varsity sports ==
Wabash sponsors 12 varsity sports, which include baseball, basketball, cross country, football, golf, lacrosse, soccer, swimming, tennis, track and field, volleyball, and wrestling.

=== Basketball ===
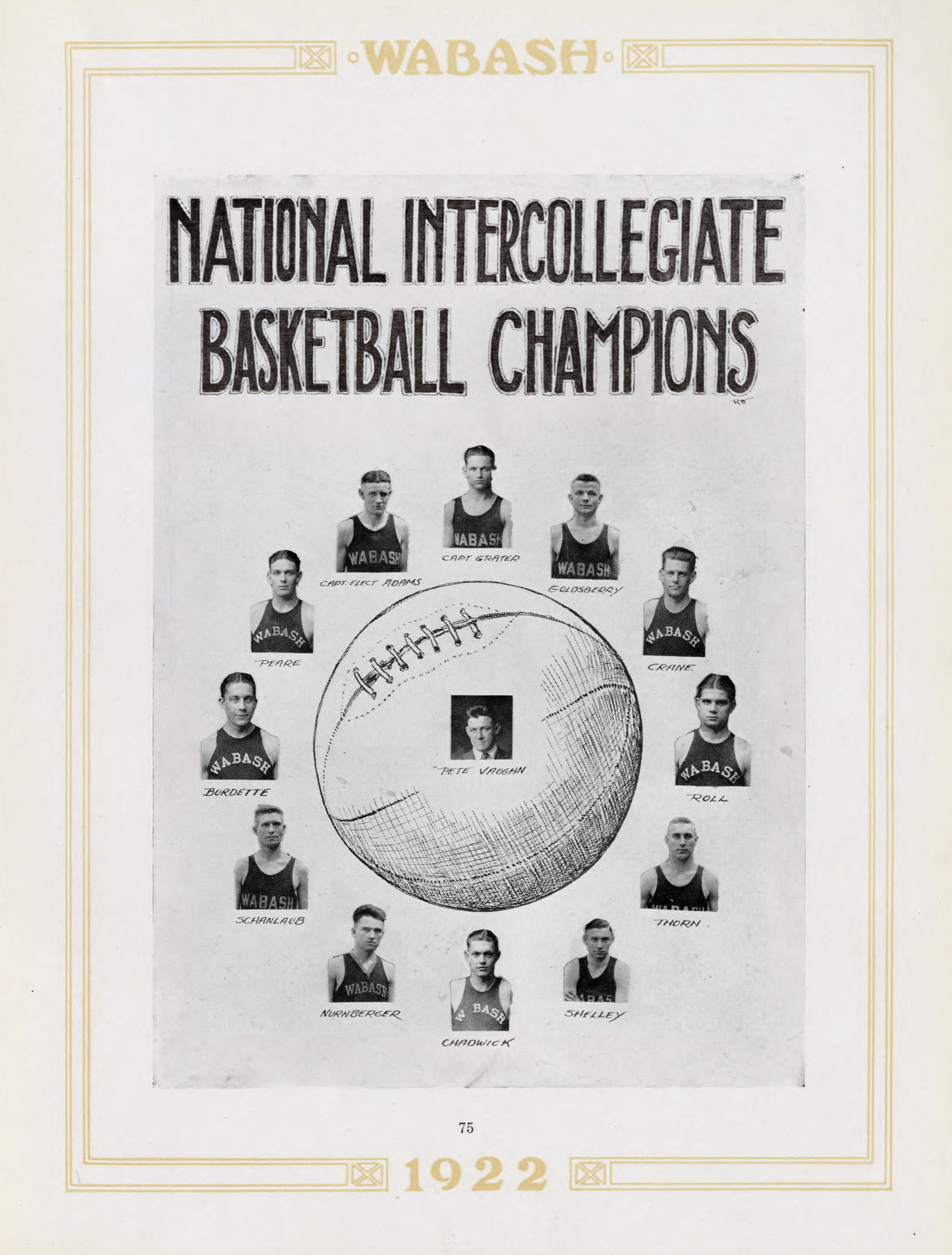
Wabash won the national intercollegiate basketball tournament in 1922

Wabash College began varsity intercollegiate competition in men's basketball in 1897.

Wabash was retroactively named as the top team for both the 1905–06 and 1907–08 seasons by the Premo-Porretta Power Poll. The 1922 National Intercollegiate Basketball Tournament was the first national championship tournament ever held in intercollegiate basketball. The 1921–22 Wabash College team won the championship game, 43–23, over Kalamazoo College. Wabash finished with a season record of 21–3, winning all three tournament games in convincing fashion. They were coached by Robert E. "Pete" Vaughan and their players were Fred Adam, Paul Schanlaub, Lon Goldsberry, John Burns, and Clyde Grater.

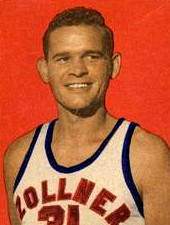
Paul Armstrong (here depicted on a 1948 Bowman card) was Wabash coach for two seasons

Wabash also won the 1982 NCAA Division III championship. Coached by Mac Petty (whose name now adorns the Chadwick Court floor) and captained by Mike Holcomb and future NFL star Pete Metzelaars, rolled their way to a 23–4 season. They were considered an inexperienced squad (their captains being the only seniors) coming into the season. They did win their opener in Greencastle against rival DePauw in a comeback effort, 63–62. Of the four games they lost, only one was to another Division III school, Hope College, in a thrilling overtime game in Crawfordsville. The other three were to Division I Louisiana Tech and UT San Antonio and Division II Texas A&I. The team finished the year on a 19-game winning streak. Along the way, they broke Rose-Hulman's 12-game win streak, defeating the Engineers 100–51. The team received their NCAA bid the next day. They closed the regular season defeating DePauw by 10 in Crawfordsville.

In the regional tournament, Wabash first met Ohio Northern and rode Metzelaars' 30 point effort to an easy 81–61 win. Next up, the Little Giants were able to avenge their only Division III loss of the season against Hope, winning 82–70. The next two games did not come so easily, squeezing out a 54–51 win against Augustana and sweating out a 68–64 win against Stanislaus State. Wabash then faced defending champion Potsdam State. The champs had no answer for Metzelaars, however, as he poured in 45 points en route to an 83–62 victory. It was the largest margin of victory in the championship at the time.

=== Football ===
In 1884, Wabash played its first game of intercollegiate football when it defeated a team from Butler University on October 25, 4–0. The first intercollegiate game in the state took place on May 31, between Butler and DePauw University. From the 1890s to the 1910s, the Wabash football team played schedules against many much larger colleges, such as Illinois, Indiana and Purdue, against whom the Little Giants occasionally won impressive upsets. For instance Wabash won all five games against Purdue between 1906 and 1911.
