= Robert E. Vaughan =

American football and basketball coach (1888–1969)

Biographical details
- Born: December 29, 1888
- Died: February 18, 1969 (aged 80); Crawfordsville, Indiana, U.S.

Playing career

Football
- 1908–1909: Notre Dame
- 1911–1912: Princeton
- Position: Fullback

Coaching career (HC unless noted)

Football
- 1919–1945: Wabash

Basketball
- 1912–1916: Purdue
- 1919–1940: Wabash

Administrative career (AD unless noted)
- 1919–1947: Wabash
- 1961–1963: Wabash

Head coaching record
- Overall: 118–85–24 (football); 216–207 (basketball)

Robert E. "Pete" Vaughan (December 29, 1888 – February 18, 1969) was an American football player, coach of football and basketball, and college athletics administrator. He served was head football coach at Wabash College for 27 seasons, from 1919 to 1945, compiling a record of 118–85–24.

In 1922, he also coached Wabash to the championship of the first national intercollegiate basketball tournament ever held. Prior to coaching Wabash, he spent four seasons (1912–1916) coaching the Purdue Boilermakers basketball team, leading them to a record of 21–32.

Vaughan attended Crawfordsville High School and the University of Notre Dame. He played college football alongside Knute Rockne, who became the head coach of the Fighting Irish.

== Head coaching record ==
=== Football ===
Year	Team	Overall	Conference	Standing	Bowl/playoffs
Wabash Little Giants (Independent) (1919–1924)
1919	Wabash	4–3–2			
1920	Wabash	3–4			
1921	Wabash	7–2			
1922	Wabash	7–3			
1923	Wabash	4–3–2			
1924	Wabash	5–4			
Wabash Little Giants (Indiana Intercollegiate Conference) (1925–1945)
1925	Wabash	5–3–1			
1926	Wabash	5–4			
1927	Wabash	7–2			
1928	Wabash	4–4–1			
1929	Wabash	4–5			
1930	Wabash	3–6			
1931	Wabash	3–5–1			
1932	Wabash	4–2–2			
1933	Wabash	4–2–1	4–2–1	5th	
1934	Wabash	4–2–2	4–1–2	T–3rd	
1935	Wabash	6–1–1	6–1–1	3rd	
1936	Wabash	7–1	6–1	3rd	
1937	Wabash	3–3–2	3–2–2	8th	
1938	Wabash	1–6–1	1–5–1	T–12th	
1939	Wabash	3–5–1	2–3–1	9th	
1940	Wabash	4–4–1	4–2	T–6th	
1941	Wabash	5–3–1	4–2	T–3rd	
1942	Wabash	4–2–1	4–1	T–3rd	
1943	Wabash	4–2–2			
1944	Wabash	6–1–1			
1945	Wabash	2–3–1	1–1–1	T–5th	
Wabash:		118–85–24			
Total:		118–85–24			

=== Basketball ===
Record table
Season	Team	Overall	Conference	Standing	Postseason
Purdue Boilermakers (Western Conference) (1912–1916)
1912–13	Purdue	7–5	6–5	3rd	
1913–14	Purdue	5–9	3–9	7th	
1914–15	Purdue	5–8	4–8	6th	
1915–16	Purdue	4–10	2–10	9th	
Purdue:		21–32 (.396)	15–32 (.319)		
Wabash Little Giants (Independent) (1919–1940)
1919–20	Wabash	13–8			
1920–21	Wabash	21–4			
1921–22	Wabash	21–3			National Intercollegiate Champions
1922–23	Wabash	17–10			
1923–24	Wabash	4–8			
1924–25	Wabash	18–1			
1925–26	Wabash	4–12			
1926–27	Wabash	13–8			
1927–28	Wabash	1–12			
1928–29	Wabash	5–8			
1929–30	Wabash	8–7			
1930–31	Wabash	5–12			
1931–32	Wabash	4–12			
1932–33	Wabash	5–11			
1933–34	Wabash	9–7			
1934–35	Wabash	10–7			
1935–36	Wabash	8–7			
1936–37	Wabash	4–10			
1937–38	Wabash	7–6			
1938–39	Wabash	8–9			
1939–40	Wabash	9–13			
Wabash:		194–175 (.526)			
Total:		215–207 (.509)			
National champion Postseason invitational champion Conference regular season champion Conference regular season and conference tournament champion Division regular season champion Division regular season and conference tournament champion Conference tournament champion
