= 1921–22 Washington Huskies men's basketball team =

American college basketball season

1921–22 Washington Huskies men's basketball
- Conference: Pacific Coast Conference
- Record: 12–4 (5–3 PCC)
- Head coach: Hec Edmundson (2nd season)
- Captain: James Bryan

1921–22 Pacific Coast Conference men's basketball standings
	Conf.				Overall
Team	W		L	PCT	W		L	PCT
Idaho	7	–	0	1.000	19	–	2	.905
Oregon Agricultural	10	–	2	.833	21	–	2	.913
California	10	–	4	.714	19	–	6	.760
Washington	11	–	5	.688	13	–	5	.722
Stanford	4	–	6	.400	8	–	7	.533
Washington State	4	–	11	.267	9	–	17	.346
USC	1	–	3	.250	7	–	5	.583
Oregon	0	–	16	.000	7	–	24	.226
As of 1922

The 1921–22 Washington Huskies men's basketball team represented the University of Washington for the 1921–22 NCAA college basketball season. Led by second-year head coach Hec Edmundson, the Huskies were members of the Pacific Coast Conference and played their home games on campus in Seattle, Washington.

The Huskies were 13–5 overall in the regular season and 11–5 in conference play; fourth in the standings. Washington opened the season with twelve wins, but lost five of their last six.

The PCC became an eight-team league this year with the addition of USC and Idaho; the Vandals won the season title, and repeated the next year.
