= 1934–35 Washington State Cougars men's basketball team =

American college basketball season

1934–35 Washington State Cougars men's basketball
- Conference: Pacific Coast Conference
- Record: 12–12 (6–10 PCC)
- Head coach: Jack Friel (7th season)
- Home arena: WSC Gymnasium

1934–35 Pacific Coast Conference men's basketball standings
	Conf.				Overall
Team	W		L	PCT	W		L	PCT
North
Oregon State	12	–	4	.750	19	–	9	.679
Washington	11	–	5	.688	16	–	8	.667
Oregon	7	–	9	.438	16	–	12	.571
Washington State	6	–	10	.375	12	–	12	.500
Idaho	4	–	12	.250	11	–	16	.407
South
USC †	11	–	1	.917	20	–	6	.769
California	5	–	7	.417	11	–	14	.440
Stanford	4	–	8	.333	9	–	18	.333
UCLA	4	–	8	.333	11	–	12	.478
† Conference playoff series winner

The 1934–35 Washington State Cougars men's basketball team represented Washington State College for the 1934–35 college basketball season. Led by seventh-year head coach Jack Friel, the Cougars were members of the Pacific Coast Conference and played their home games on campus at WSC Gymnasium in Pullman, Washington.

The Cougars were 12–12 overall in the regular season and 6–10 in conference play, fourth in the Northern division.

The National Invitation Tournament (NIT) debuted in 1938, and the NCAA tournament in 1939.
