= 1929–30 Washington State Cougars men's basketball team =

American college basketball season

1929–30 Washington State Cougars men's basketball
- Conference: Pacific Coast Conference
- Record: 14–12 (9–7 PCC)
- Head coach: Jack Friel (2nd season)
- Home arena: WSC Gymnasium

1929–30 Pacific Coast Conference men's basketball standings
	Conf.				Overall
Team	W		L	PCT	W		L	PCT
North
Washington	12	–	4	.750	21	–	7	.750
Washington State	9	–	7	.563	14	–	12	.538
Oregon	8	–	8	.500	14	–	12	.538
Oregon State	7	–	9	.438	14	–	13	.519
Idaho	4	–	12	.250	7	–	18	.280
South
USC †	7	–	2	.778	15	–	5	.750
California	6	–	3	.667	9	–	8	.529
UCLA	3	–	6	.333	14	–	8	.636
Stanford	2	–	7	.222	10	–	9	.526
† Conference playoff series winner

The 1929–30 Washington State Cougars men's basketball team represented Washington State College for the 1929–30 college basketball season. Led by second-year head coach Jack Friel, the Cougars were members of the Pacific Coast Conference and played their home games on campus at WSC Gymnasium in Pullman, Washington.

The Cougars were 14–12 overall in the regular season and 9–7 in conference play, second in the Northern division.
