= 1925–26 Washington State Cougars men's basketball team =

American college basketball season

1925–26 Washington State Cougars men's basketball
- Conference: Pacific Coast Conference
- Record: 9–17 (1–8 PCC)
- Head coach: Fred Bohler (18th season)

1925–26 Pacific Coast Conference men's basketball standings
	Conf.				Overall
Team	W		L	PCT	W		L	PCT
North
Oregon	10	–	0	1.000	18	–	4	.818
Oregon Agricultural	6	–	4	.600	18	–	6	.750
Idaho	5	–	4	.556	15	–	10	.600
Washington	5	–	5	.500	10	–	6	.625
Montana	2	–	8	.200	5	–	10	.333
Washington State	1	–	8	.111	9	–	17	.346
South
California †	5	–	0	1.000	14	–	0	1.000
Stanford	3	–	2	.600	10	–	6	.625
USC	0	–	6	.000	4	–	8	.333
† Conference playoff series winner

The 1925–26 Washington State Cougars men's basketball team represented Washington State College for the 1925–26 college basketball season. Led by eighteenth-year head coach Fred Bohler, the Cougars were members of the Pacific Coast Conference and played their home games on campus in Pullman, Washington.

The Cougars were 9–17 overall in the regular season and 1–8 in conference play, last in the Northern division.

This was Bohler's final season as head coach, but he continued on for years as athletic director at Washington State. Karl Schlademan, previously at the University of Kansas, was the track and field coach for the Cougars until 1940, and also the head basketball coach for his first two years in Pullman (1926–28).
