= 1929–30 UCLA Bruins men's basketball team =

American college basketball season

1929–30 UCLA Bruins men's basketball
- Conference: Pacific Coast Conference
- South
- Record: 14–8 (3–6 PCC)
- Head coach: Caddy Works (9th season)
- Assistant coaches: Silas Gibbs; Wilbur Johns

1929–30 Pacific Coast Conference men's basketball standings
| | Conf. | | | | Overall |
| Team | W | | L | PCT | W | | L | PCT |
|---|---|---|---|---|---|---|---|---|
North
| Washington | 12 | – | 4 | .750 | 21 | – | 7 | .750 |
| Washington State | 9 | – | 7 | .563 | 14 | – | 12 | .538 |
| Oregon | 8 | – | 8 | .500 | 14 | – | 12 | .538 |
| Oregon State | 7 | – | 9 | .438 | 14 | – | 13 | .519 |
| Idaho | 4 | – | 12 | .250 | 7 | – | 18 | .280 |
South
| USC † | 7 | – | 2 | .778 | 15 | – | 5 | .750 |
| California | 6 | – | 3 | .667 | 9 | – | 8 | .529 |
| UCLA | 3 | – | 6 | .333 | 14 | – | 8 | .636 |
| Stanford | 2 | – | 7 | .222 | 10 | – | 9 | .526 |
† Conference playoff series winner

The 1929–30 UCLA Bruins men's basketball team represented the University of California, Los Angeles during the 1929–30 NCAA men's basketball season and were members of the Pacific Coast Conference. The Bruins were led by ninth year head coach Caddy Works. They finished the regular season with a record of 14–8 and were third in the southern division with a record of 3–6.

== Previous season ==
The Bruins finished the season 7–9 overall and were fourth in the PCC south division with a record of 1–8.

== Roster ==
1929–30 UCLA Bruins men's basketball team
Players
Coaches

| Pos. | # | Name | Height | Weight | Year | Hometown |
|---|---|---|---|---|---|---|
| G | | Carl Brown | — | — |
| F | | Bill Gilbert | — | — |
| F | | David Graham | — | — |
| C | | Carl Knowles | — | — |
| F | | James Leyh | — | — |
| C | | Frank Lubin | 6 ft 5 in (1.96 m) | 232 lb (105 kg) | | Los Angeles, California |
| F | | David Milne | — | — |
| F | | Erwin Piper | — | — |
| G | | Howard Roberts | — | — |
| G | | Carl Sky | — | — |
| G | | Harold Smith | — | — |
| F | | Dick von Hagen | — | — |
| C | | Charles Wilbur | — | — |
| | 31 | Larry Wilds (C) | — | — |
| G | | Dave Williams | — | — |

Head coach

Caddy Works

Assistant coach(es)

- Wilbur Johns (UCLA)
- Silas Gibbs (UCLA)

Legend

- (C) Team captain
- (S) Suspended
- (I) Ineligible
- (W) Walk-on
- Injured
- Current redshirt

Roster
Last update: 30 January 2018

== Schedule ==
| Date time, TV | Rank^{#} | Opponent^{#} | Result | Record | Site city, state |
Regular Season
| * | | Elks Club | W 51–34 | 1–0 | Physical Education Building; Los Angeles, CA |
| * | | La Verne | W 37–22 | 2–0 | Physical Education Building; Los Angeles, CA |
| * | | at Pomona | W 48–19 | 3–0 | Claremont, CA |
| * | | Hollywood Athletic Club | W 44–32 | 4–0 | Physical Education Building; Los Angeles, CA |
| * | | Los Angeles Athletic Club | W 23–17 | 5–0 | Physical Education Building; Los Angeles, CA |
| * | | Whittier | W 34–14 | 6–0 | Physical Education Building; Los Angeles, CA |
| * | | Occidental | W 46–2 | 7–0 | Physical Education Building; Los Angeles, CA |
| * | | Caltech | W 53–24 | 8–0 | Physical Education Building; Los Angeles, CA |
| * | | BYU | L 40–47 | 8–1 | Physical Education Building; Los Angeles, CA |
| * | | BYU | W 47–43 | 9–1 | Physical Education Building; Los Angeles, CA |
| * | | Utah | W 44–34 | 10–1 | Physical Education Building; Los Angeles, CA |
| * | | Utah | W 43–33 | 11–1 | Physical Education Building; Los Angeles, CA |
| * | | Utah | L 44–52 | 11–2 | Physical Education Building; Los Angeles, CA |
| | | Stanford | W 63–30 | 12–2 (1–0) | Physical Education Building; Los Angeles, CA |
| | | at California | W 26–23 | 13–2 (2–0) | Harmon Gym; Berkeley, CA |
| | | USC | L 16–33 | 13–3 (2–1) | Physical Education Building; Los Angeles, CA |
| | | at Stanford | L 37–40 | 13–4 (2–2) | Stanford Pavilion; Stanford, CA |
| | | at Stanford | W 20–15 | 14–4 (3–2) | Stanford Pavilion; Stanford, CA |
| | | California | L 29–32 | 14–5 (3–3) | Physical Education Building; Los Angeles, CA |
| | | California | L 30–32 | 14–6 (3–4) | Physical Education Building; Los Angeles, CA |
| | | USC | L 30–42 | 14–7 (3–5) | Physical Education Building; Los Angeles, CA |
| | | USC | L 28–33 | 14–8 (3–6) | Physical Education Building; Los Angeles, CA |
*Non-conference game. ^{#}Rankings from AP Poll. (#) Tournament seedings in parentheses. All times are in Pacific Time.
