= 1932–33 Idaho Vandals men's basketball team =

American college basketball season

1932–33 Idaho Vandals men's basketball
- Conference: Pacific Coast Conference
- Record: 20–9 (8–8 PCC)
- Head coach: Rich Fox (6th season)
- Assistant coach: Glenn Jacoby
- Home arena: Memorial Gymnasium

1932–33 Pacific Coast Conference men's basketball standings
| | Conf. | | | | Overall |
| Team | W | | L | PCT | W | | L | PCT |
|---|---|---|---|---|---|---|---|---|
North
| Oregon State † | 12 | – | 4 | .750 | 21 | – | 6 | .778 |
| Washington | 10 | – | 6 | .625 | 22 | – | 6 | .786 |
| Washington State | 8 | – | 8 | .500 | 17 | – | 8 | .680 |
| Idaho | 8 | – | 8 | .500 | 20 | – | 9 | .690 |
| Oregon | 2 | – | 14 | .125 | 8 | – | 19 | .296 |
South
| USC | 10 | – | 1 | .909 | 18 | – | 5 | .783 |
| California | 8 | – | 3 | .727 | 18 | – | 7 | .720 |
| Stanford | 3 | – | 8 | .273 | 9 | – | 18 | .333 |
| UCLA | 1 | – | 10 | .091 | 10 | – | 11 | .476 |
† Conference playoff series winner

The 1932–33 Idaho Vandals men's basketball team represented the University of Idaho during the 1932–33 NCAA college basketball season. Members of the Pacific Coast Conference, the Vandals were led by sixth-year head coach Rich Fox and played their home games on campus at Memorial Gymnasium in Moscow, Idaho.

The Vandals were 20–9 overall and 8–8 in conference play.
