= 1934–35 UCLA Bruins men's basketball team =

American college basketball season

1934–35 UCLA Bruins men's basketball
- Conference: Pacific Coast Conference
- South
- Record: 11–12 (4–8 PCC)
- Head coach: Caddy Works (14th season)
- Assistant coaches: Wilbur Johns; Silas Gibbs; Dick Linthicum

1934–35 Pacific Coast Conference men's basketball standings
	Conf.				Overall
Team	W		L	PCT	W		L	PCT
North
Oregon State	12	–	4	.750	19	–	9	.679
Washington	11	–	5	.688	16	–	8	.667
Oregon	7	–	9	.438	16	–	12	.571
Washington State	6	–	10	.375	12	–	12	.500
Idaho	4	–	12	.250	11	–	16	.407
South
USC †	11	–	1	.917	20	–	6	.769
California	5	–	7	.417	11	–	14	.440
Stanford	4	–	8	.333	9	–	18	.333
UCLA	4	–	8	.333	11	–	12	.478
† Conference playoff series winner

The 1934–35 UCLA Bruins men's basketball team represented the University of California, Los Angeles during the 1934–35 NCAA men's basketball season and were members of the Pacific Coast Conference. The Bruins were led by 14th year head coach Caddy Works. They finished the regular season with a record of 11–12 and were third in the southern division with a record of 4–8.

== Previous season ==
The Bruins finished the regular season with a record of 10–13 and were fourth in the southern division with a record of 2–10.

== Roster ==
1934–35 UCLA Bruins men's basketball team
Players
Coaches

Pos.	#	Name	Height	Weight	Year	Hometown
G	18	Don Ashen	—	—	Jr
C	22	John Ball	—	—
C		Morris Caldwell	—	—
		Cordner Gibson (C)	—	—
G	23	Horace Haight	—	—
G		Kenneth Lueke	—	—
G	27	Bill Maxwell	—	—
F		Clem Melancon	—	—
F		Bill Reitz	—	—
G		William Robinson	—	—
G		John Wells	—	—

Head coach

Caddy Works

Assistant coach(es)

- Wilbur Johns (UCLA)
- Silas Gibbs (UCLA)
- Dick Linthicum (UCLA)

Legend

- (C) Team captain
- (S) Suspended
- (I) Ineligible
- (W) Walk-on
- Injured
- Current redshirt

Roster
Last update: 30 January 2018

== Schedule ==
Date time, TV	Rank^{#}	Opponent^{#}	Result	Record	Site city, state
Regular Season
*		at Whittier	W 47–30	1–0	Whittier, CA
*		Los Angeles Junior College	W 31–15	2–0	Men's Gym; Los Angeles, CA
*		at Fresno State	W 35–31	3–0	Fresno, CA
*		at Chico State	W 43–41 ^{OT}	4–0	Chico, CA
*		at San Jose State	L 30–32	5–0	Spartan Gym; San Jose, CA
*		at Santa Clara	L 30–32	5–1	Santa Clara, CA
*		Universal Pictures	L 11–20	5–2	Men's Gym; Los Angeles, CA
*		at St. Mary's	L 34–38	5–3	Moraga, CA
*		Utah State	L 39–44	5–4	Men's Gym; Los Angeles, CA
*		at San Diego State	W 31–28	6–4	San Diego, CA
*		at San Diego State	W 34–25	7–4	San Diego, CA
		USC	L 34–39	7–5 (0–1)	Men's Gym; Los Angeles, CA
		USC	L 22–52	7–6 (0–2)	Men's Gym; Los Angeles, CA
		USC	L 22–55	7–7 (0–3)	Men's Gym; Los Angeles, CA
		USC	L 33–43	7–8 (0–4)	Men's Gym; Los Angeles, CA
		California	W 35–24	8–8 (1–4)	Men's Gym; Los Angeles, CA
		California	L 26–38	8–9 (1–5)	Men's Gym; Los Angeles, CA
		at California	W 39–37 ^{OT}	9–9 (2–5)	Men's Gym; Berkeley, CA
		at California	L 21–38	9–10 (2–6)	Men's Gym; Berkeley, CA
		Stanford	W 34–27	10–10 (3–6)	Men's Gym; Los Angeles, CA
		Stanford	W 38–32	11–10 (4–6)	Men's Gym; Los Angeles, CA
		at Stanford	L 28–33	11–11 (4–7)	Stanford Pavilion; Stanford, CA
		at Stanford	L 16–35	11–12 (4–8)	Stanford Pavilion; Stanford, CA
*Non-conference game. ^{#}Rankings from AP Poll. (#) Tournament seedings in parentheses. All times are in Pacific Time.
