= Ralph Hutchinson =

American athlete (1878–1935)

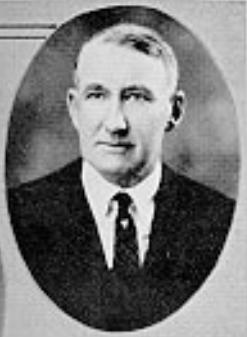
- Wickiup 1923, Idaho State yearbook

Biographical details
- Born: February 19, 1878; Elmira, New York, U.S.
- Died: March 30, 1935 (aged 57); Moscow, Idaho, U.S.

Playing career

Football
- 1898–1899: Princeton
- 1900: Greensburg A. A.
- Position: Quarterback

Coaching career (HC unless noted)

Football
- 1900: Greensburg A. A.
- 1901: Dickinson
- 1902: Princeton (backs)
- 1903–1905: Texas
- 1911–1916: New Mexico
- 1918: Washington & Jefferson
- 1919: Idaho
- 1920–1927: Idaho Technical / Idaho Southern Branch

Basketball
- 1910–1917: New Mexico
- 1919–1920: Idaho
- 1926–1927: Idaho Technical

Baseball
- 1904–1906: Texas
- 1910–1917: New Mexico

Administrative career (AD unless noted)
- 1911–1917: New Mexico
- 1928–1929: Idaho

Head coaching record
- Overall: 62–55–6 (college football); 3–6–1 (pro football); 56–18 (college basketball); 69–44–2 (college baseball)

Ralph Fielding "Hutch" Hutchinson (February 19, 1878 – March 30, 1935) was an American football, basketball, and baseball player. He served as the head football coach at Dickinson College (1901), the University of Texas at Austin (1903–1905), the University of New Mexico (1911–1916), Washington & Jefferson College (1918), the University of Idaho (1919), and the Idaho Technical Institute (now Idaho State University) (1920–1927), compiling a career college football record of 62–55–6. Hutchinson was also the head basketball coach at New Mexico (1910–1917), Idaho (1919–1920), and Idaho Technical (1926–1927), amassing a career college basketball record of 56–18, and the head baseball coach at Texas from 1904 to 1906 and at New Mexico from 1910 to 1917, tallying a career college baseball mark of 69–44–2.

== Playing career ==
Born in Elmira, New York, Hutchinson played varsity football and baseball and ran track at Princeton University. In football, he was a quarterback and later played the position as a player-coach for the Greensburg Athletic Association, an early professional football team out of Greensburg, Pennsylvania, in 1900.

Hutchinson also played minor league baseball. He played for the 1902 Flandreau Indians of the Iowa-South Dakota League. There, his manager was Art Hillebrand, who played college football with Hutchinson at Princeton and was later inducted into the College Football Hall of Fame.

== Coaching career ==
=== Dickinson ===
Hutchison was the third head football coach at Dickinson College in Carlisle, Pennsylvania, serving for one season, in the 1901.

=== Texas ===
From 1903 to 1905, Hutchinson coached at Texas, where he compiled a 16–7–2 record.

=== New Mexico ===
Hutchinson was the first basketball coach at the University of New Mexico, compiling a 32–8 record from 1910 to 1917. New Mexico played games only sporadically before the 1920s, with no regular schedule.

=== Washington & Jefferson ===
Hutchinson was hired in August 1918 as head coach at Washington & Jefferson, south of Pittsburgh.

=== Idaho ===
Hutchinson was the head football coach at the University of Idaho for the 1919 season. A "shorter than normal" season, his team posted a 2–3 record. He also coached the basketball team for the 1919–20 season.

=== Idaho Technical Institute ===
In 1920, Hutchinson moved south to the Idaho Technical Institute in Pocatello. He coached through the 1927 season, tallying a 25–22–2 (.531) record at the two-year school, which was renamed the "University of Idaho–Southern Branch" in 1927. It was renamed "Idaho State College" in 1947 after gaining four-year status and became Idaho State University in 1963.

On November 4, 1922, the Idaho Tech football team played its first game on Hutchinson Field, named in his honor. The field was used until partway through the 1936 season, when football games moved to the "Spud Bowl". The former Hutchinson Field area continues to be known as the Hutchinson Memorial Quadrangle.

== After coaching ==
After eight years in Pocatello, Hutchinson returned to the University of Idaho in Moscow in 1928, where he was the athletic director for a year, as well as the head track coach and an assistant football coach. After the hiring of Leo Calland in 1929, Hutchinson was the athletic trainer and a professor of physical education, and the head coach of minor sports. Following a brief illness, he died at the age of 57 on March 30, 1935, of a heart attack at his Moscow home. In 1980, Hutchinson was inducted to Idaho State's athletic hall of fame.

== Head coaching record ==
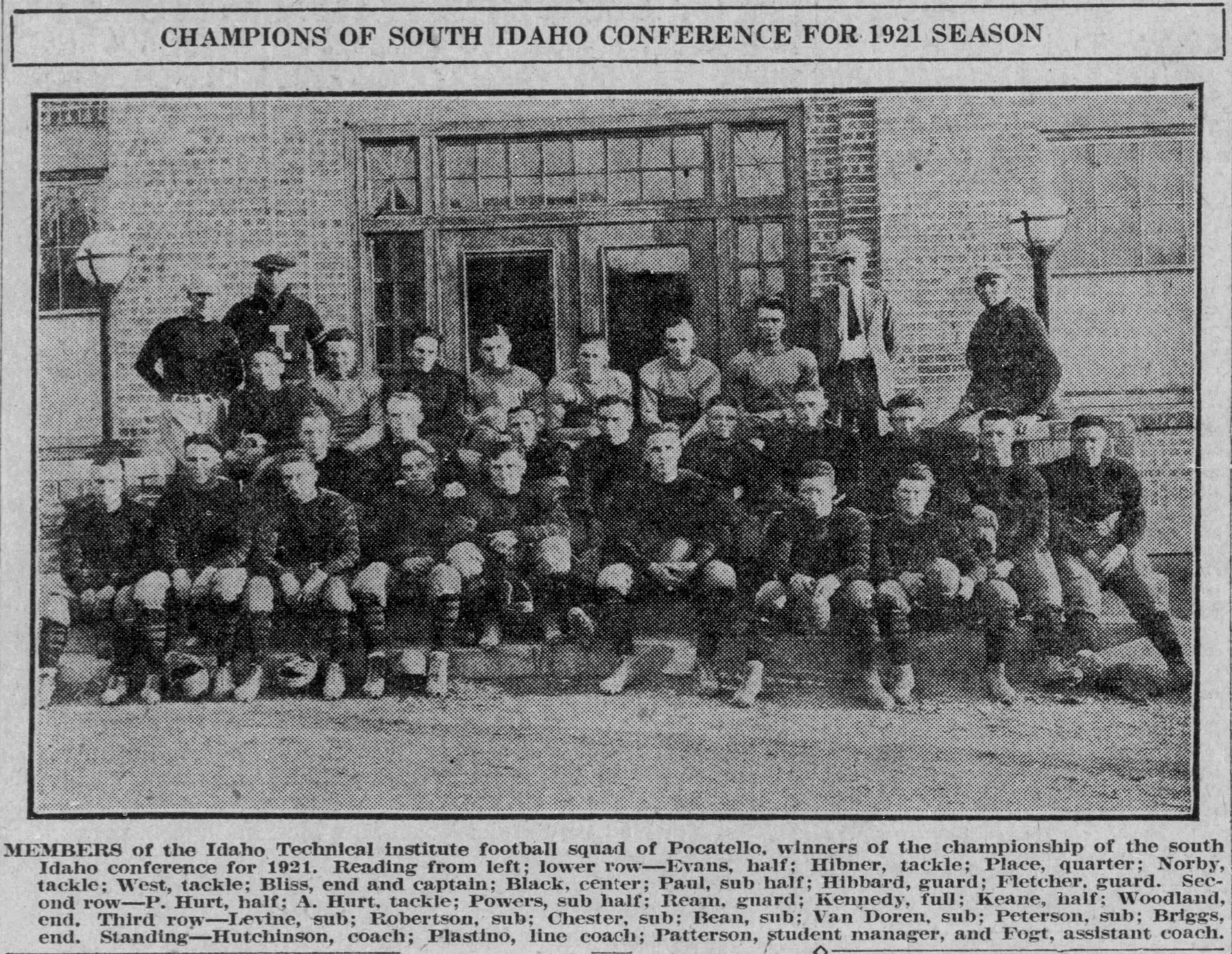
1921 Idaho Technical Tigers team photo—Hutchinson is standing at far left of the back row

=== College football ===
Year	Team	Overall	Conference	Standing	Bowl/playoffs
Dickinson Red and White (Independent) (1901)
1901	Dickinson	4–6			
Dickinson:		4–6			
Texas Longhorns (Southern Intercollegiate Athletic Association) (1903–1905)
1903	Texas	5–1–2	1–0–1	T–5th	
1904	Texas	6–2	1–0	4th	
1905	Texas	5–4	2–1	5th	
Texas:		16–7–2	4–1–1		
New Mexico (Independent) (1911–1916)
1911	New Mexico	1–3–1			
1912	New Mexico	0–4			
1913	New Mexico	3–2			
1914	New Mexico	3–1–1			
1915	New Mexico	3–1			
1916	New Mexico	3–2			
New Mexico:		13–13–2			
Washington & Jefferson Red and Black (Independent) (1918)
1918	Washington & Jefferson	2–2			
Washington & Jefferson:		2–2			
Idaho Vandals (Northwest Conference) (1919)
1919	Idaho	2–3	1–2	4th	
Idaho:		2–3			
Idaho Technical / Idaho Southern Branch Tigers (junior college) (1920–1927)
1920	Idaho Technical	3–3			
1921	Idaho Technical	6–2			
1922	Idaho Technical	4–3			
1923	Idaho Technical	3–2–1			
1924	Idaho Technical	5–2			
1925	Idaho Technical	2–4			
1926	Idaho Technical	1–4			
1927	Idaho Southern Branch	1–4–1			
Idaho Technical / Idaho Southern Branch:		25–24–2			
Total:		62–55–6			
