= 1935–36 Idaho Vandals men's basketball team =

American college basketball season

1935–36 Idaho Vandals men's basketball
- Conference: Pacific Coast Conference
- Record: 12–15 (2–14 PCC)
- Head coach: Rich Fox (9th season)
- Assistant coach: Al Paddock
- Home arena: Memorial Gymnasium

1935–36 Pacific Coast Conference men's basketball standings
	Conf.				Overall
Team	W		L	PCT	W		L	PCT
North
Washington	13	–	3	.813	25	–	7	.781
Oregon State	10	–	6	.625	16	–	9	.640
Washington State	8	–	8	.500	22	–	8	.733
Oregon	7	–	9	.438	20	–	11	.645
Idaho	2	–	14	.125	12	–	15	.444
South
Stanford †	8	–	4	.667	22	–	7	.759
USC	8	–	4	.667	14	–	12	.538
California	6	–	6	.500	13	–	16	.448
UCLA	2	–	10	.167	10	–	13	.435
† Conference playoff series winner

The 1935–36 Idaho Vandals men's basketball team represented the University of Idaho during the 1935–36 NCAA college basketball season. Members of the Pacific Coast Conference, the Vandals were led by ninth-year head coach Rich Fox and played their home games on campus at Memorial Gymnasium in Moscow, Idaho.

The Vandals were 12–15 overall and 2–14 in conference play.

After the season in June, alumnus Fox resigned to enter private business.
