= 1932–33 Washington Huskies men's basketball team =

American college basketball season

1932–33 Washington Huskies men's basketball
- Conference: Pacific Coast Conference
- Record: 22–6 (10–6 PCC)
- Head coach: Hec Edmundson (13th season)
- Captain: Pete Antoncich
- Home arena: UW Pavilion

1932–33 Pacific Coast Conference men's basketball standings
	Conf.				Overall
Team	W		L	PCT	W		L	PCT
North
Oregon State †	12	–	4	.750	21	–	6	.778
Washington	10	–	6	.625	22	–	6	.786
Washington State	8	–	8	.500	17	–	8	.680
Idaho	8	–	8	.500	20	–	9	.690
Oregon	2	–	14	.125	8	–	19	.296
South
USC	10	–	1	.909	18	–	5	.783
California	8	–	3	.727	18	–	7	.720
Stanford	3	–	8	.273	9	–	18	.333
UCLA	1	–	10	.091	10	–	11	.476
† Conference playoff series winner

The 1932–33 Washington Huskies men's basketball team represented the University of Washington for the 1932–33 NCAA college basketball season. Led by thirteenth-year head coach Hec Edmundson, the Huskies were members of the Pacific Coast Conference and played their home games on campus at the UW Pavilion in Seattle, Washington.

The Huskies were 22–6 overall in the regular season and 10–6 in conference play; second in the Northern division.

The National Invitation Tournament (NIT) debuted in 1938, and the NCAA Tournament in 1939.
