= 1929–30 Washington Huskies men's basketball team =

American college basketball season

1929–30 Washington Huskies men's basketball

PCC Northern Division Champions
- Conference: Pacific Coast Conference
- Record: 21–7 (12–4 PCC)
- Head coach: Hec Edmundson (10th season)
- Captain: Harold McClary
- Home arena: UW Pavilion

1929–30 Pacific Coast Conference men's basketball standings
| | Conf. | | | | Overall |
| Team | W | | L | PCT | W | | L | PCT |
|---|---|---|---|---|---|---|---|---|
North
| Washington | 12 | – | 4 | .750 | 21 | – | 7 | .750 |
| Washington State | 9 | – | 7 | .563 | 14 | – | 12 | .538 |
| Oregon | 8 | – | 8 | .500 | 14 | – | 12 | .538 |
| Oregon State | 7 | – | 9 | .438 | 14 | – | 13 | .519 |
| Idaho | 4 | – | 12 | .250 | 7 | – | 18 | .280 |
South
| USC † | 7 | – | 2 | .778 | 15 | – | 5 | .750 |
| California | 6 | – | 3 | .667 | 9 | – | 8 | .529 |
| UCLA | 3 | – | 6 | .333 | 14 | – | 8 | .636 |
| Stanford | 2 | – | 7 | .222 | 10 | – | 9 | .526 |
† Conference playoff series winner

The 1929–30 Washington Huskies men's basketball team represented the University of Washington for the 1929–30 NCAA college basketball season. Led by tenth-year head coach Hec Edmundson, the Huskies were members of the Pacific Coast Conference and played their home games on campus at the UW Pavilion in Seattle, Washington.

The Huskies were 20–5 overall in the regular season and 12–4 in conference play; first in the Northern division for a third consecutive year.

Washington traveled to Los Angeles and met Southern division winner USC in the Pacific Coast championship series. The Huskies lost the first game, and won the second, setting up a third and deciding game, which they lost by six. This was the seventh consecutive year that the title series was won by the Southern division team.

The National Invitation Tournament (NIT) debuted in 1938, and the NCAA Tournament in 1939.

== Roster ==
Starters:

- Hal McClary - center
- Stan Jaloff - forward
- Hank Swanson - forward
- Ralph Cairney - guard
- Art Peterson - guard

== Postseason results ==
| Date time, TV | Opponent | Result | Record | Site (attendance) city, state |
Pacific Coast Conference Playoff Series
| Fri, March 7 | at USC; Game One | L 31–46 | 20–6 | Los Angeles, California |
| Sat, March 8 | at USC; Game Two | W 36–32 | 21–6 | Los Angeles, California |
| Mon, March 10 | at USC; Game Three | L 29–35 | 21–7 | Los Angeles, California |
*Non-conference game. (#) Tournament seedings in parentheses. All times are in Pacific time.
