= 1898–99 Washington men's basketball team =

American college basketball season

1895–96 Washington men's basketball
- Conference: Independent
- Record: 1–1

The 1898–99 Washington Huskies men's basketball team represented the University of Washington during the 1898–99 college men's basketball season.

== Schedule ==
Date time, TV	Opponent	Result	Record	Site city, state
January 14*	Seattle HS	W 12–5	1–0	Seattle, Washington
January 21*; 1:30 p.m.	Everett HS	L 7–10	1–1	Campus Armory; Seattle, WA
*Non-conference game. (#) Tournament seedings in parentheses.
