= 1935–36 Washington Huskies men's basketball team =

American college basketball season

1935–36 Washington Huskies men's basketball

PCC Northern Division Champions
- Conference: Pacific Coast Conference
- Record: 25–7 (13–3 PCC)
- Head coach: Hec Edmundson (16th season)
- Captain: Ralph Bishop
- Home arena: UW Pavilion

1935–36 Pacific Coast Conference men's basketball standings
	Conf.				Overall
Team	W		L	PCT	W		L	PCT
North
Washington	13	–	3	.813	25	–	7	.781
Oregon State	10	–	6	.625	16	–	9	.640
Washington State	8	–	8	.500	22	–	8	.733
Oregon	7	–	9	.438	20	–	11	.645
Idaho	2	–	14	.125	12	–	15	.444
South
Stanford †	8	–	4	.667	22	–	7	.759
USC	8	–	4	.667	14	–	12	.538
California	6	–	6	.500	13	–	16	.448
UCLA	2	–	10	.167	10	–	13	.435
† Conference playoff series winner

The 1935–36 Washington Huskies men's basketball team represented the University of Washington for the 1935–36 NCAA college basketball season. Led by sixteenth-year head coach Hec Edmundson, the Huskies were members of the Pacific Coast Conference and played their home games on campus at the UW Pavilion in Seattle, Washington.

The Huskies were 21–4 overall in the regular season and 13–3 in conference play; first in the Northern division. Washington traveled to Stanford for the conference playoff series and were swept in two games.

In the Olympic Trials soon after the season, the Huskies were 4–1.

The National Invitation Tournament (NIT) debuted in 1938, and the NCAA tournament in 1939.

== Postseason results ==
Date time, TV	Opponent	Result	Record	Site (attendance) city, state
Pacific Coast Conference Playoff Series
Fri, March 13	vs. Stanford; Game One	L 39–60	21–5	Civic Auditorium; San Francisco, California
Sat, March 14	at Stanford; Game Two	L 38–48	21–6	Stanford Pavilion; Stanford, California
*Non-conference game. (#) Tournament seedings in parentheses. All times are in Pacific time.
