= Ryan Ridder =

American basketball player and coach (born 1984)

Current position
- Title: Head coach
- Team: Mercer
- Conference: SoCon
- Record: 34–32 (.515)

Biographical details
- Born: November 11, 1984 (age 41); Lexington, Kentucky, U.S.

Playing career
- 2003–2005: College of Wooster
- 2005–2008: Embry-Riddle

Coaching career (HC unless noted)
- 2008–2009: North Raleigh Christian (assistant)
- 2009–2010: Embry-Riddle (assistant)
- 2010–2013: Campbell (assistant)
- 2013–2017: Daytona State
- 2017–2021: Bethune–Cookman
- 2021–2024: UT Martin
- 2024–present: Mercer

Head coaching record
- Overall: 130–124 (.512) (NCAA); 95–28 (.772) (NJCAA)

Accomplishments and honors

Championships
- 4 Mid-Florida Conference regular season (2013–2017); MEAC regular season (2018); OVC regular season (2024)

Ryan Ridder (born November 11, 1984) is an American college basketball coach and current head coach for the Mercer Bears men's basketball team. He previously served as the head coach at Bethune–Cookman and UT Martin.

== Coaching career ==
After completing a playing career at Embry-Riddle under his father, Steve, Ridder got his coaching start at North Raleigh Christian Academy as an assistant coach before returning to his alma mater as an assistant a year later. Ridder served as an assistant at Campbell for three seasons before taking the head coaching job at Daytona State College. While guiding the Falcons, Ridder compiled a 95–28 overall record, and four-straight Mid-Florida Conference regular season championships, as well as back-to-back coach of the year honors.

Ridder was named the head coach at Bethune-Cookman on March 31, 2017. After three seasons with the Wildcats, Ridder accepted the head coaching position at UT Martin on March 30, 2021.

== Head coaching record ==
=== Junior college ===
Record table
Season	Team	Overall	Conference	Standing	Postseason
Daytona State Falcons (Mid-Florida Conference) (2013–2017)
2013–14	Daytona State	24–6	7–2	1st	
2014–15	Daytona State	21–8	8–1	1st	
2015–16	Daytona State	25–7	6–3	1st	
2016–17	Daytona State	25–7	7–2	1st	
Daytona State:		95–28 (.772)	28–8 (.778)		
Total:		95–28 (.772)			
National champion Postseason invitational champion Conference regular season champion Conference regular season and conference tournament champion Division regular season champion Division regular season and conference tournament champion Conference tournament champion

=== College ===
Record table
Season	Team	Overall	Conference	Standing	Postseason
Bethune–Cookman Wildcats (Mid-Eastern Athletic Conference) (2017–2021)
2017–18	Bethune–Cookman	18–14	12–4	T–1st	
2018–19	Bethune–Cookman	14–17	9–7	T–4th	
2019–20	Bethune–Cookman	16–14	10–6	T–4th	
Bethune-Cookman:		48–45 (.516)	31–17 (.646)		
UT Martin Skyhawks (Ohio Valley Conference) (2021–2024)
2021–22	UT Martin	8–22	4–14	9th	
2022–23	UT Martin	19–14	10–8	T–3rd	
2023–24	UT Martin	21–11	14–4	T–1st	
UT Martin:		48–47 (.505)	28–26 (.519)		
Mercer Bears (Southern Conference) (2024–present)
2024–25	Mercer	14–19	6–12	8th	
2025–26	Mercer	19–13	11–7	T–2nd	
2026–27	Mercer	1–0	0–0		
Mercer:		34–32 (.515)	17–19 (.472)		
Total:		130–124 (.512)			
National champion Postseason invitational champion Conference regular season champion Conference regular season and conference tournament champion Division regular season champion Division regular season and conference tournament champion Conference tournament champion
