= 1925–26 Washington Huskies men's basketball team =

American college basketball season

1925–26 Washington Huskies men's basketball
- Conference: Pacific Coast Conference
- Record: 10–6 (5–5 PCC)
- Head coach: Hec Edmundson (6th season)
- Captain: Gratton Hale

1925–26 Pacific Coast Conference men's basketball standings
	Conf.				Overall
Team	W		L	PCT	W		L	PCT
North
Oregon	10	–	0	1.000	18	–	4	.818
Oregon Agricultural	6	–	4	.600	18	–	6	.750
Idaho	5	–	4	.556	15	–	10	.600
Washington	5	–	5	.500	10	–	6	.625
Montana	2	–	8	.200	5	–	10	.333
Washington State	1	–	8	.111	9	–	17	.346
South
California †	5	–	0	1.000	14	–	0	1.000
Stanford	3	–	2	.600	10	–	6	.625
USC	0	–	6	.000	4	–	8	.333
† Conference playoff series winner

The 1925–26 Washington Huskies men's basketball team represented the University of Washington for the 1925–26 NCAA college basketball season. Led by sixth-year head coach Hec Edmundson, the Huskies were members of the Pacific Coast Conference and played their home games on campus in Seattle, Washington.

The Huskies were 10–6 overall in the regular season and 5–5 in conference play; fourth place in the Northern division.
