= 1934–35 Washington Huskies men's basketball team =

American college basketball season

1934–35 Washington Huskies men's basketball
- Conference: Pacific Coast Conference
- Record: 16–8 (11–5 PCC)
- Head coach: Hec Edmundson (15th season)
- Captain: Bob Gaier
- Home arena: UW Pavilion

1934–35 Pacific Coast Conference men's basketball standings
| | Conf. | | | | Overall |
| Team | W | | L | PCT | W | | L | PCT |
|---|---|---|---|---|---|---|---|---|
North
| Oregon State | 12 | – | 4 | .750 | 19 | – | 9 | .679 |
| Washington | 11 | – | 5 | .688 | 16 | – | 8 | .667 |
| Oregon | 7 | – | 9 | .438 | 16 | – | 12 | .571 |
| Washington State | 6 | – | 10 | .375 | 12 | – | 12 | .500 |
| Idaho | 4 | – | 12 | .250 | 11 | – | 16 | .407 |
South
| USC † | 11 | – | 1 | .917 | 20 | – | 6 | .769 |
| California | 5 | – | 7 | .417 | 11 | – | 14 | .440 |
| Stanford | 4 | – | 8 | .333 | 9 | – | 18 | .333 |
| UCLA | 4 | – | 8 | .333 | 11 | – | 12 | .478 |
† Conference playoff series winner

The 1934–35 Washington Huskies men's basketball team represented the University of Washington for the 1934–35 NCAA college basketball season. Led by fifteenth-year head coach Hec Edmundson, the Huskies were members of the Pacific Coast Conference and played their home games on campus at the UW Pavilion in Seattle, Washington.

The Huskies were 16–8 overall in the regular season and 11–5 in conference play; second in the Northern division.

The National Invitation Tournament (NIT) debuted in 1938, and the NCAA tournament in 1939.
