= 1924–25 Washington Huskies men's basketball team =

American college basketball season

1924–25 Washington Huskies men's basketball
- Conference: Pacific Coast Conference
- Record: 14–7 (5–5 PCC)
- Head coach: Hec Edmundson (5th season)

1924–25 Pacific Coast Conference men's basketball standings
	Conf.				Overall
Team	W		L	PCT	W		L	PCT
North
Oregon Agricultural	7	–	2	.778	29	–	8	.784
Oregon	7	–	2	.778	16	–	4	.800
Washington	5	–	5	.500	14	–	7	.667
Idaho	5	–	5	.500	19	–	8	.704
Montana	2	–	6	.250	9	–	10	.474
Washington State	2	–	8	.200	18	–	11	.621
South
California †	3	–	1	.750	11	–	4	.733
Stanford	1	–	3	.250	10	–	3	.769
† Conference playoff series winner

The 1924–25 Washington Huskies men's basketball team represented the University of Washington for the 1924–25 NCAA college basketball season. Led by fifth-year head coach Hec Edmundson, the Huskies were members of the Pacific Coast Conference and played their home games on campus in Seattle, Washington.

The Huskies were 14–7 overall in the regular season and 5–5 in conference play; tied for third in the Northern division.
