= 1922–23 Washington Huskies men's basketball team =

American college basketball season

1922–23 Washington Huskies men's basketball

PCC Northern Division Co-Champions
- Conference: Pacific Coast Conference
- Record: 12–4 (5–3 PCC)
- Head coach: Hec Edmundson (3rd season)
- Captain: Evan Lewis

1922–23 Pacific Coast Conference men's basketball standings
	Conf.				Overall
Team	W		L	PCT	W		L	PCT
North
Idaho †	5	–	3	.625	27	–	3	.900
Washington	5	–	3	.625	12	–	4	.750
Oregon Agricultural	4	–	4	.500	19	–	7	.731
Washington State	4	–	4	.500	16	–	10	.615
Oregon	2	–	6	.250	15	–	10	.600
South
California	5	–	3	.625	12	–	6	.667
Stanford	5	–	3	.625	12	–	4	.750
USC	2	–	6	.250	5	–	12	.294
† Conference playoff series winner As of 1923

The 1922–23 Washington Huskies men's basketball team represented the University of Washington for the 1922–23 NCAA college basketball season. Led by third-year head coach Hec Edmundson, the Huskies were members of the Pacific Coast Conference and played their home games on campus in Seattle, Washington.

The Huskies were 12–3 overall in the regular season and 5–3 in conference play; tied for first in the Northern division.

Washington tied with Idaho in the North, so they met in a playoff game in Spokane, which the Vandals won. Born and raised in Moscow, Edmundson was a UI alumnus and former head coach. California and Stanford tied for the Southern Division title, but since the Golden Bears had won three of four in the season series, the Cardinals opted out of a playoff and ceded the title.

== Postseason result ==
Date time, TV	Opponent	Result	Record	Site (attendance) city, state
PCC Northern Division Playoff
Wed, Feb 28	vs. Idaho	L 21–24	12–4	Gonzaga Gym; Spokane, Washington
*Non-conference game. (#) Tournament seedings in parentheses.
