= 1922–23 Idaho Vandals men's basketball team =

American college basketball season

1922–23 Idaho Vandals men's basketball

Pacific Coast Conference Champions

PCC Playoff Series, 2–0
- Conference: Pacific Coast Conference
- Record: 27–3 (5–3 PCC)
- Head coach: Dave MacMillan (3rd season)
- Captain: Rich Fox
- Home arena: Armory and Gymnasium

1922–23 Pacific Coast Conference men's basketball standings
	Conf.				Overall
Team	W		L	PCT	W		L	PCT
North
Idaho †	5	–	3	.625	27	–	3	.900
Washington	5	–	3	.625	12	–	4	.750
Oregon Agricultural	4	–	4	.500	19	–	7	.731
Washington State	4	–	4	.500	16	–	10	.615
Oregon	2	–	6	.250	15	–	10	.600
South
California	5	–	3	.625	12	–	6	.667
Stanford	5	–	3	.625	12	–	4	.750
USC	2	–	6	.250	5	–	12	.294
† Conference playoff series winner As of 1923

The 1922–23 Idaho Vandals men's basketball team represented the University of Idaho during the 1922–23 NCAA college basketball season. Members of the Pacific Coast Conference, the Vandals were led by third-year head coach Dave MacMillan and played their home games on campus at the Armory and Gymnasium in Moscow, Idaho.

The Vandals were 27–3 overall and 5–3 in conference play. The PCC had expanded to eight teams the previous year and it was divided into two divisions for the first time, with five in the North and three in the South; the winners advanced to a best-of three playoff series. Idaho was led on the court by captain Rich Fox; "Bullet" became the head coach four years later.

Idaho tied with Washington in the Northern Division, so they met in a playoff game in Spokane, which the Vandals won. The Huskies were led by UI alumnus and former head coach Hec Edmundson. California and Stanford tied for the Southern Division title, but since the Golden Bears had won three of four in the season series, the Cardinals opted out of a playoff and ceded the title.

California had hoped to play the championship series in Portland or Spokane, but the conference decided it was to be held on campus in Moscow; the Vandals won the first two games to successfully defend the title. It was Idaho's last PCC crown; the only other division title came 23 years later in 1946, but they lost that playoff series at California in three games.

The Vandals' next conference title in basketball came 58 years later, in the Big Sky in 1981 (and 1982).

== Postseason results ==
Date time, TV	Opponent	Result	Record	Site (attendance) city, state
PCC Northern Division Playoff
Wed, Feb 28	vs. Washington	W 24–21	25–3	Gonzaga Gym; Spokane, Washington
Pacific Coast Conference Playoff Series
Mon, March 5	California; Game One	W 28–20	26–3	UI Armory & Gym; Moscow, Idaho
Tue, March 6	California; Game Two	W 29–25	27–3	UI Armory & Gym; Moscow, Idaho
*Non-conference game. (#) Tournament seedings in parentheses.
