= 1922 National Intercollegiate basketball tournament =

US sport event

1922 National Intercollegiate Basketball Tournament
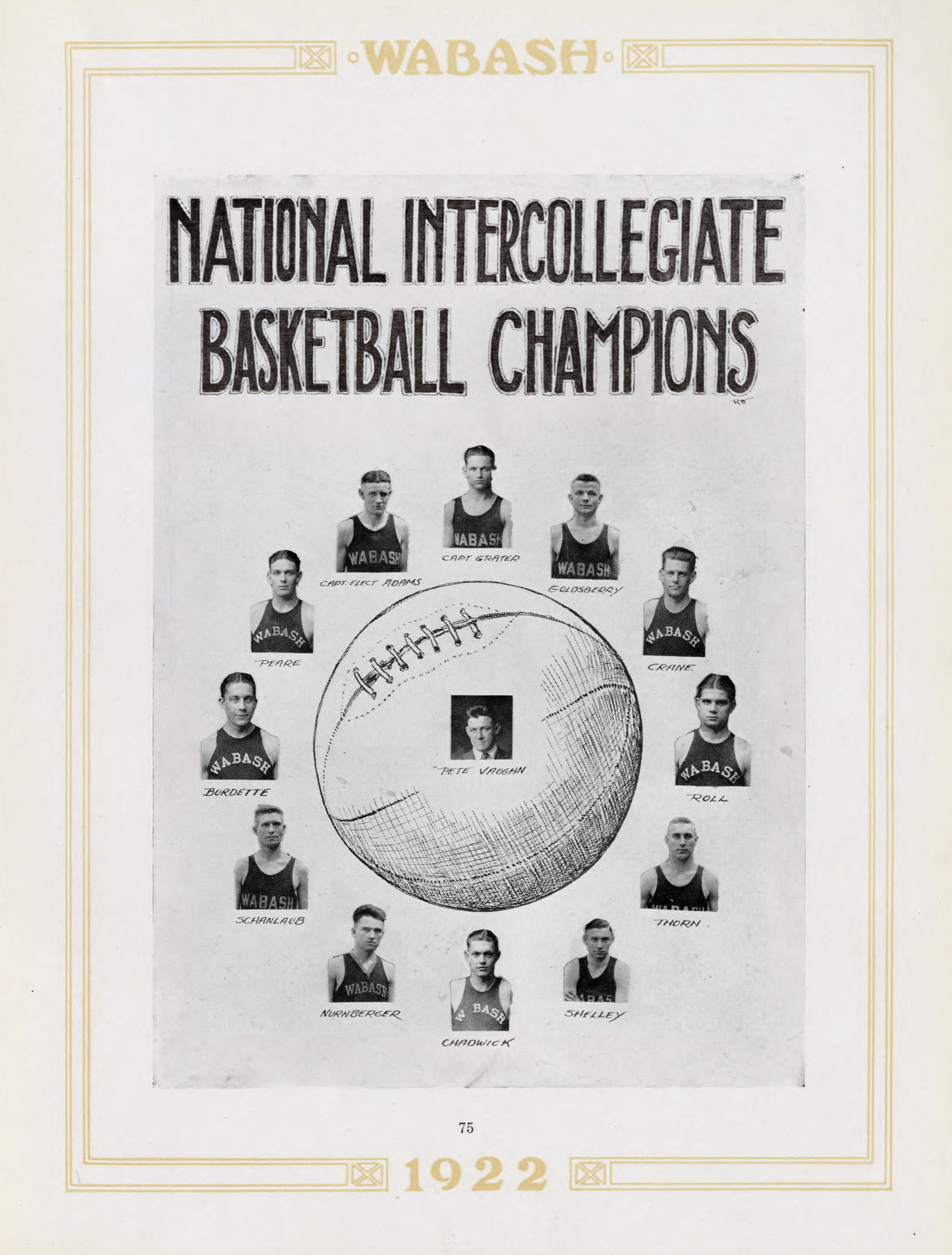
- Championship page from The Wabash Year Book.

Tournament details
- City: Indianapolis
- Venue: Indiana State Fair Coliseum
- Dates: March 9–11, 1922
- Teams: 6

Final positions
- Champions: Wabash
- Runners-up: Kalamazoo

The 1922 National Intercollegiate basketball tournament was the first national championship tournament ever held in intercollegiate basketball. Played March 9–11 at the Indiana State Fair Coliseum in Indianapolis, Indiana, it attracted six teams, including five conference champions.

Participants included Wabash College, Kalamazoo College, Grove City College (Pennsylvania), S.I.A.A. tournament runner-up Mercer University (Georgia), Illinois Wesleyan and the University of Idaho. In January, 1922, the Western Conference and Eastern Intercollegiate Basketball League declined invitations to participate.

The following conferences were represented: Pacific Coast Conference (Idaho), Southern Intercollegiate Athletic Association (Mercer), Western Pennsylvania League (Grove City), Illinois Intercollegiate Athletic Conference (Illinois Wesleyan), Michigan Intercollegiate Athletic Association (Kalamazoo) and the Indiana Intercollegiate Athletic Association (Wabash).

Wabash won the championship game 43–23 over Kalamazoo; Wabash finished with a season record of 21–3, winning all three tournament games in convincing fashion. They were coached by the legendary Robert E. "Pete" Vaughan, and their players were Clyde O Grater, Alonzo Goldsberry, Herbert Crane, Elmer G Roll, Lee N "Pete" Thorn, Ovid M Shelley, Maurice Chadwick, Carl Nurnberger, Paul Schanlaub, Donald Burdette, Reeve S Peare, Fred B Adam. These 12 were the Basketball "W" Men. Grater was the captain of the Wabash Little Giants with Adam being the captain-elect. The team averaged 15.08 field goals and 6.12 foul goals per game for the season. High point man was Goldsberry.

== Tournament organization and team selection ==
The tournament was organized by the Indianapolis Junior Chamber of Commerce. In January, 1922, the Western Conference and Eastern Intercollegiate Basketball League declined early invitations to send their champions. For the EIBL, the scheduling of the tournament made it impossible for its champion to participate. The league had not yet completed its season when the tournament was held. Penn played Dartmouth, and Cornell played Princeton on the day of the tournament final, and the league still had games remaining after that.

Therefore, the organizers selected Rutgers to represent the east. Three of the organizers' original choices accepted bids to the tournament, and three declined. Only one (Missouri) of the three declining teams decided to participate in another tournament instead. The other two (North Carolina and Rutgers) were barred from participating by their schools' administrations. Thus, the east and Missouri Valley regions were not represented as originally planned and were replaced by the champions of Michigan and Illinois. These two replacements were not mere emergency fill-ins; both were under consideration for bids when the organizers entertained the idea of expanding the tournament to eight teams.

Independent Wabash, the tournament champion, had won at Purdue, the Western Conference champion, in early March, avenging a home loss to the Boilermakers in December. As of March 2, the day after Wabash won at Purdue, it was reported that Wabash had been selected to represent the central-west portion of the country, Rutgers to represent the east, and Idaho to represent the Pacific coast and northwest. The original plan contemplated a six-team tournament comprising teams selected from different parts of the country. Organizers considered expanding the tournament to eight teams to include two more teams from among Brigham Young to represent the Rocky Mountains, Kalamazoo to represent Michigan, either Knox or Illinois Wesleyan to represent Illinois, and a second southern team in addition to the primary representative that had not yet been invited. The Southern Conference (SoCon) and Southern Intercollegiate Athletic Association (SIAA) staged a joint postseason tournament in 1922, to determine a champion of the south. Alabama had lost in the semifinals to fellow SoCon member North Carolina but nevertheless requested an invitation to the national tournament.

On March 6, just three days before the start of the tournament, organizers scrapped the notion of increasing the field to eight teams and announced the six teams that had been selected. These were Wabash from the middle west, Grove City from western Pennsylvania and West Virginia, Rutgers from the Atlantic seaboard, North Carolina from the south, Missouri from the Missouri Valley Conference, and Idaho representing the Pacific slope. North Carolina's faculty would not consent to the team's participation in the tournament, and Mercer of the SIAA, which had lost to the Tar Heels in the southern tournament final, were chosen as the replacement. Rutgers's faculty also refused permission for the team to participate at the last minute, reaching the decision the day before the tournament began and after their participation had been confirmed. Rutgers was replaced by Kalamazoo, representing Michigan. Missouri participated in the national AAU tournament instead of this tournament. Illinois Wesleyan, representing Illinois, replaced Missouri in the field.

At least one newspaper editor concluded the tournament was a national championship in name only due to the absence of more representative teams, while many newspapers in a nationally syndicated article reported Wabash's national championship, mentioning the accomplishments of participants, with one praising the participants as representing the best that could be sent from around the country.

== Bracket ==
March 9–11, 1922, in Indianapolis

Quarterfinals
Wabash (IN)	39
Illinois Wesleyan	16
Kalamazoo (MI)	38
Idaho	31

Semifinals
Mercer (GA)	25
Wabash	62
Grove City (PA)	13
Kalamazoo	22

Finals
Wabash	43
Kalamazoo	23
