= Hec Edmundson =

American sprinter

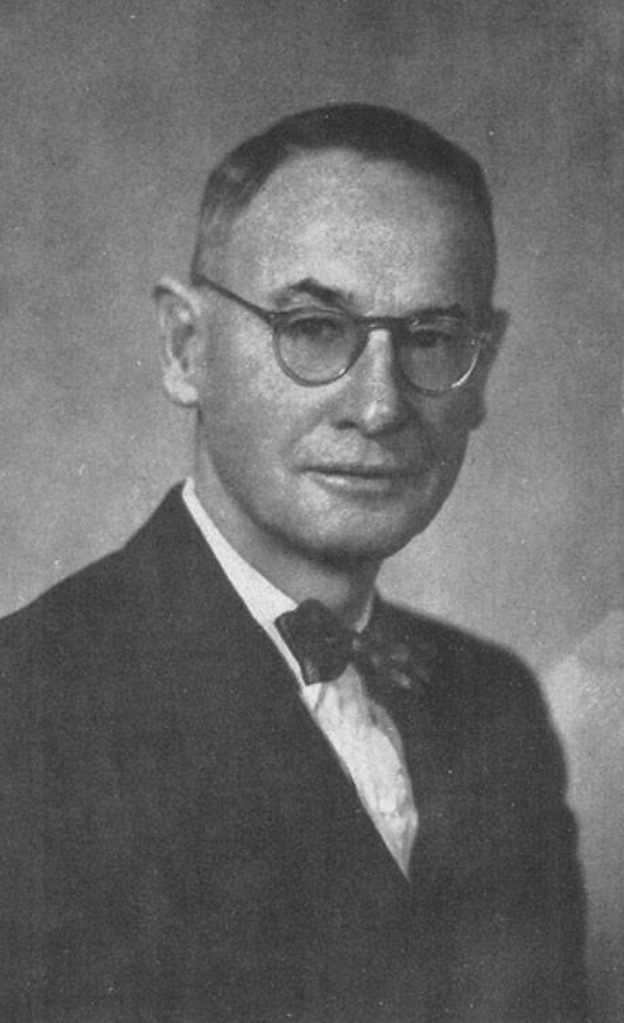
- 1945 Tyee yearbook

Biographical details
- Born: August 3, 1886; Moscow, Idaho, U.S.
- Died: August 6, 1964 (aged 78); Seattle, Washington, U.S.
- Education: University of Idaho, B.S. (agriculture), 1910

Coaching career (HC unless noted)

Basketball
- 1916–1918: Idaho
- 1920–1947: Washington

Track and field
- 1913–1915: Idaho
- 1916: Whitman
- 1917–1918: Idaho
- 1919: Texas A&M
- 1920–1954: Washington

Head coaching record
- Overall: 508–204 (basketball)

Clarence Sinclair "Hec" Edmundson (August 3, 1886 – August 6, 1964) was an American basketball and track coach.

A native of Moscow, Idaho, and a 1910 graduate of the University of Idaho, Edmundson coached at his alma mater (1916–18) and the University of Washington (1920–47), compiling a 508–204 (.713) overall record in 29 seasons.

Edmundson also coached the track teams and served on the NCAA Basketball Committee from 1941 to 1946. The University of Washington hosted the national basketball finals in 1949 and 1952 in the arena that bears his name.

== Nickname ==
Edmundson gained his nickname from his mother: as a child, he often muttered, "Oh, heck."

== Collegiate and Olympic career ==
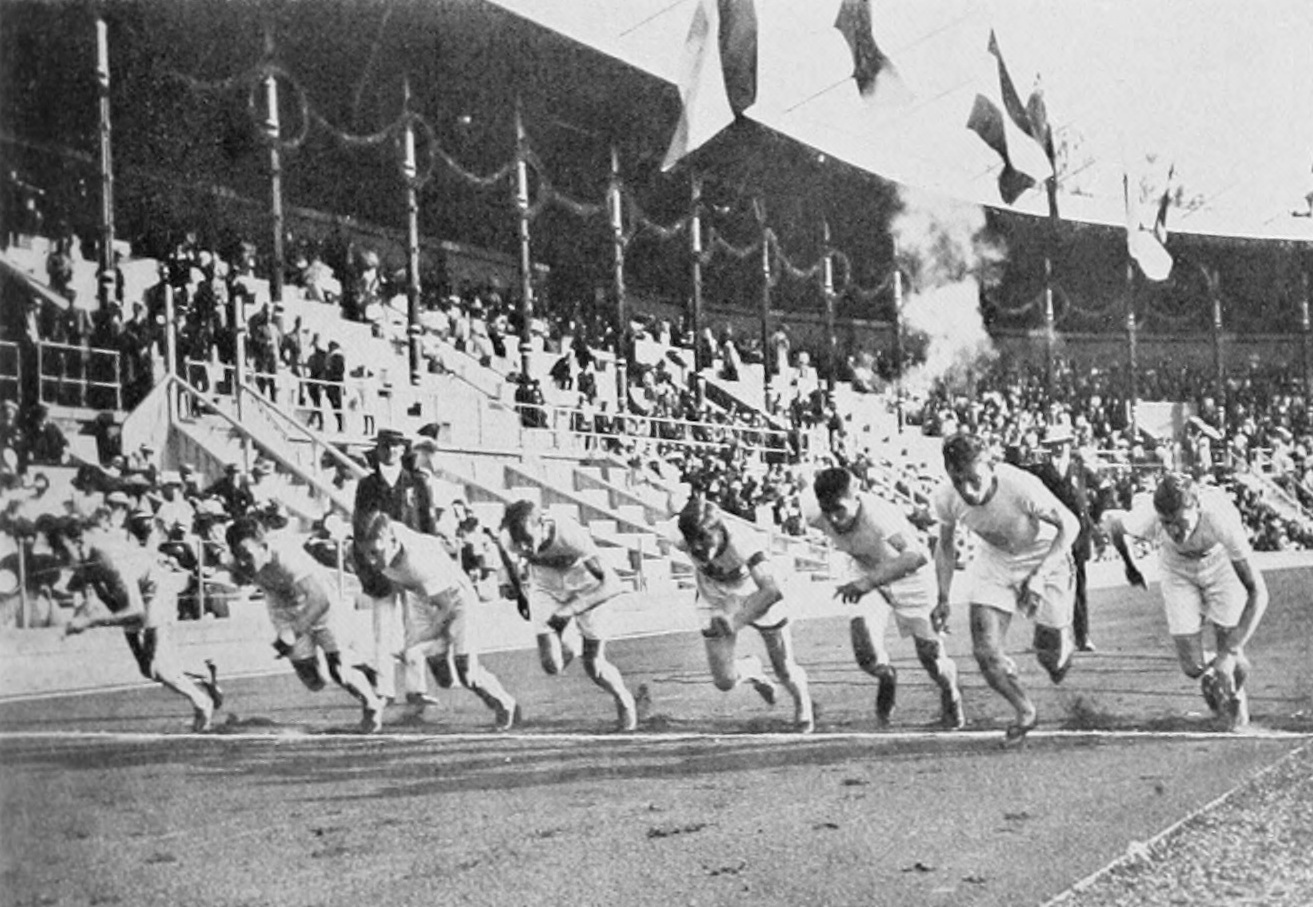
Final of the 800 m at the 1912 Olympics; Edmundson is second from right

One of the first great athletes at the fledgling University of Idaho in Moscow, Edmundson competed in track for his hometown university and launched the team onto the national stage when he and two other athletes traveled to the Lewis and Clark Exposition Games against the top schools in the Northwest. While still in high school at the UI prep school, he lowered the Northwest record for the half-mile in June 1905.

Newspapers wrote that Edmundson was "impressed with his graceful form and unfaltering determination." He is responsible for organizing the Idaho cross country team in 1908, which set the foundation for a team that would win nine Pacific Coast Conference titles. In 1908, Edmundson traveled to Stanford for the western U.S. Olympic trials, where he won the 800 meters and finished second in the 400 meters, but did not make the Olympic team. He later held the title of top half-miler in the country through 1912. Edmundson became the first Idahoan to compete in the Olympic Games in Stockholm in 1912. He finished seventh in the 800 meters and sixth in the 400 meters.

Edmundson attended the UI prep school and was a charter member of the new chapter of Kappa Sigma fraternity as an undergraduate. He earned a bachelor's degree in agriculture from Idaho in 1910, and then taught and coached at the high school level, one year each at Coeur d'Alene and Broadway High School in Seattle. He returned to Moscow to coach the UI track team in 1913.

== Coaching career ==
After several seasons as track coach at Idaho, he left after a salary dispute and coached at Whitman College in nearby Walla Walla for a season. He returned to Idaho as both track and basketball coach in 1916, and his basketball teams compiled a 20–9 record in two seasons. It was these basketball teams which were the first UI teams referred to as the Vandals; the nickname was eventually applied to all of the university's athletic teams by the early 1920s.

After a track season at Texas A&M, he headed to Seattle to coach the Washington Huskies, where he is credited with the creation of the fast-break offense style, which he attributed to his track background. He coached basketball through March 1947 and continued as track coach for another seven years.

== Hec Edmundson Pavilion ==
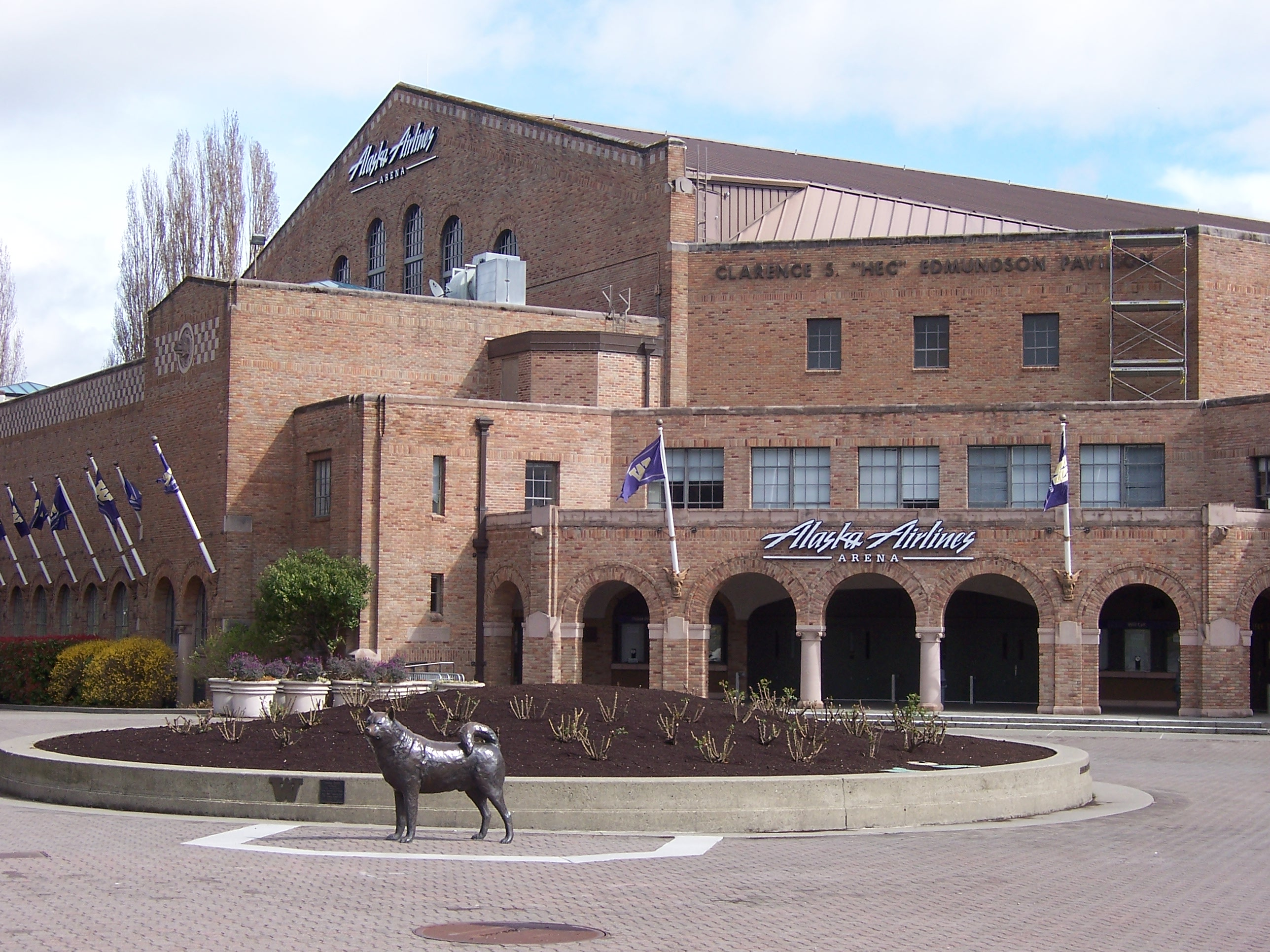
"Hec Ed" in 2012

The UW Pavilion, a multi-purpose field house opened 99 years ago in December 1927, was renamed "Hec Edmundson Pavilion" in his honor in January 1948. In March 1999, "Hec Ed" underwent a major interior renovation for 19 months and re-opened in November 2000.

== Grave ==
Edmundson died of a stroke in August 1964 at the age of 78, and was interred in Calvary Cemetery in northeast Seattle, about a mile (1½ km) north-northeast of the Hec Edmundson Pavilion. He is buried next to his wife Mary Zona Schultz (1887–1980), son James (1924–2000), and infant child (1921) (47.66733°N 122.29431°W). Edmundson was posthumously inducted into the Big W Club, the UW athletics hall of fame, in the first class of 1979.

Edmundson's parents were Thomas Sinclair Edmundson and Emma Jeannette Rowley, both buried in Moscow. His younger brother was Wilbur Clifford Edmundson, who taught horticulture at the UI and later worked for the Department of Agriculture in Washington, D.C.

== Head coaching record ==
Record table
Season	Team	Overall	Conference	Standing	Postseason
Idaho Vandals (Northwest Conference) (1916–1918)
1916–17	Idaho	8–8			
1917–18	Idaho	12–1		1st	
Idaho:		20–9 (.690)			
Washington Huskies (Pacific Coast Conference) (1920–1947)
1920–21	Washington	18–4	10–4	3rd	
1921–22	Washington	13–5	11–5	4th	
1922–23	Washington	12–4	5–3	2nd North	Lost North playoff
1923–24	Washington	12–4	7–2	1st North	Lost PCC series
1924–25	Washington	14–7	5–5	T-3rd North	
1925–26	Washington	10–6	5–5	4th North	
1926–27	Washington	15–4	7–3	T–2nd North	
1927–28	Washington	22–6	9–1	1st North	Lost PCC series
1928–29	Washington	18–2	10–0	1st North	Lost PCC series
1929–30	Washington	21–7	12–4	1st North	Lost PCC series
1930–31	Washington	25–3	14–2	1st North	Won PCC series
1931–32	Washington	19–6	12–4	1st North	Lost PCC series
1932–33	Washington	22–6	10–6	2nd North	
1933–34	Washington	20–5	14–2	1st North	Won PCC series
1934–35	Washington	16–8	11–5	2nd North	
1935–36	Washington	25–7	13–3	1st North	Lost PCC series
1936–37	Washington	15–11	11–5	T-2nd North	
1937–38	Washington	29–7	13–7	2nd North	
1938–39	Washington	20–5	11–5	2nd North	
1939–40	Washington	10–15	6–10	4th North	
1940–41	Washington	12–13	7–9	T-3rd North	
1941–42	Washington	18–7	10–6	2nd North	
1942–43	Washington	24–7	12–4	1st North	NCAA Elite Eight
1943–44	Washington	26–6	15–1	1st North	(none)
1944–45	Washington	22–18	5–11	4th North	
1945–46	Washington	14–14	6–10	4th North	
1946–47	Washington	16–8	8–8	3rd North	
Washington:		488–195 (.714)	259–130 (.666)		
Total:		508–204 (.713)			
National champion Postseason invitational champion Conference regular season champion Conference regular season and conference tournament champion Division regular season champion Division regular season and conference tournament champion Conference tournament champion
