= Dave MacMillan =

American basketball coach

Biographical details
- Born: December 24, 1886; New York City, U.S.
- Died: July 9, 1963 (aged 76); Minneapolis, Minnesota, U.S.
- Education: University of Idaho

Playing career
- 190x: Oberlin

Coaching career (HC unless noted)

Basketball
- 1920–1927: Idaho
- 1927–1942: Minnesota
- 1945–1948: Minnesota
- 1950: Tri-Cities Blackhawks

Baseball
- 1921–1927: Idaho
- 1942–1947: Minnesota

David MacMillan (December 24, 1886 – July 9, 1963) was an American basketball coach. He was a longtime head coach at the University of Minnesota (18 seasons, 1927–42, 1945–48), and briefly coached the NBA's Tri-Cities Blackhawks in 1950, succeeding Red Auerbach.

Born in New York City, he attended Oberlin College in Ohio before transferring to the University of Idaho.

Before Minnesota, MacMillan was the head coach at the University of Idaho in Moscow, his alma mater. He led the Vandals for seven seasons, from 1920 to 1927, the last six in the Pacific Coast Conference. In Idaho's first two seasons in the PCC, his upstart program won consecutive conference titles in 1922 and 1923. He also coached baseball and freshman football at Idaho, and baseball at Minnesota from 1942 through 1947.

MacMillan resigned at Minnesota at age 62 in March 1948, citing health reasons. After his brief stint with the Blackhawks, MacMillan served as an assistant coach of the Minneapolis Lakers under John Kundla, who had been a player and assistant under MacMillan at Minnesota. He died from cancer at age 76 in Minneapolis.

== Head coaching record ==
Legend
Regular season	G	Games coached	W	Games won	L	Games lost	W–L %	Win–loss %
Playoffs	PG	Playoff games	PW	Playoff wins	PL	Playoff losses	PW–L %	Playoff win–loss %

Team	Year	G	W	L	W–L%	Finish	PG	PW	PL	PW–L%	Result
Tri-Cities	1950–51	23	9	14	.391	(replaced)	—	—	—	—	—
