= 1934–35 NCAA men's basketball season =

- Helms National Champions: NYU (retroactive selection in 1943)
- Player of the Year (Helms): Leroy Edwards, Kentucky (retroactive selection in 1944)

The 1934–35 NCAA men's basketball season began in December 1934, progressed through the regular season and conference tournaments, and concluded in March 1935. This is the 17th season of the NCAA's men's basketball.

== Rules changes ==
The regulation basketball was reduced in circumference, from 32 inches (81 cm) to between 29.5 and 30.25 inches (74.9 and 76.8 cm).

== Season headlines ==
- Ned Irish began to promote college basketball doubleheaders between New York City-area teams at Madison Square Garden and intersectional games there between New York City-area teams and teams from other regions. The first intersectional game — an NYU 25–18 victory over Notre Dame on December 29, 1934 — drew 16,138 fans, a world record for attendance at a college basketball game. In the next game on January 5, 1935, NYU defeated Kentucky 23–22 before another new world record crowd of 16,539. After the NYU–Kentucky game, Kentucky head coach Adolph Rupp called for the creation of a round-robin national championship college basketball tournament.
- The American Legion sponsored an intersectional "Rose Bowl", promoted as a basketball game "for the national collegiate championship," on April 13 at the Convention Hall in Atlantic City, New Jersey. LSU defeated Pittsburgh 41–37 and claimed the mythical national collegiate basketball championship for the 1934–35 season based on this victory.

== Conference membership changes ==
| School | Former conference | New conference |
|---|---|---|
| Brooklyn Bulldogs | Metropolitan New York Conference | Non-major basketball program |
| Bucknell Bison | Eastern Intercollegiate Conference | Independent |
| Butler Bulldogs | Missouri Valley Conference | Independent |
| CCNY Beavers | Metropolitan New York Conference | Independent |
| Fordham Rams | Metropolitan New York Conference | Independent |
| Long Island Blackbirds | Metropolitan New York Conference | Independent |
| Manhattan Jaspers | Metropolitan New York Conference | Independent |
| NYU Violets | Metropolitan New York Conference | Independent |
| Pratt Cannoneers | Metropolitan New York Conference | Non-major basketball program |
| St. Francis (NY) Terriers | Metropolitan New York Conference | Independent |
| St. John's Redmen | Metropolitan New York Conference | Independent |
| Tulsa Golden Hurricane | Independent | Missouri Valley Conference |
| Washburn Ichabods | Independent | Missouri Valley Conference |

== Regular season ==
=== Conferences ===
==== Conference winners and tournaments ====
| Conference | Regular season winner | Conference player of the year | Conference tournament | Tournament venue (City) | Tournament winner |
|---|---|---|---|---|---|
| Big Six Conference | Iowa State | None selected | No Tournament | | |
| Big Ten Conference | Illinois, Purdue, & Wisconsin | None selected | No Tournament | | |
| Border Conference | Texas Tech | None selected | No Tournament | | |
| Eastern Intercollegiate Basketball League | Penn | None selected | No Tournament | | |
| Eastern Intercollegiate Conference | Pittsburgh & West Virginia | None selected | No Tournament; Pittsburgh defeated West Virginia in a single-game conference playoff | | |
| Metropolitan New York Conference | Did not play as a conference | | | | |
| Missouri Valley Conference | Creighton & Drake | None selected | No Tournament | | |
| Pacific Coast Conference | Oregon State (North); USC (South) | | No Tournament; USC defeated Oregon State in best-of-three conference championship playoff series | | |
| Rocky Mountain Athletic Conference | Colorado State College (Eastern); Utah State (Western) | | No Tournament | | |
| Southeastern Conference | Kentucky & LSU | None selected | No Tournament | | |
| Southern Conference | North Carolina | None selected | 1935 Southern Conference men's basketball tournament | Thompson Gym (Raleigh, North Carolina) | North Carolina |
| Southwest Conference | Arkansas, Rice, & SMU | None selected | No Tournament | | |

==== Conference standings ====
1934–35 Big Six Conference men's basketball standings
| | Conf. | | | | Overall |
| Team | W | | L | PCT | W | | L | PCT |
|---|---|---|---|---|---|---|---|---|
| Iowa State | 8 | – | 2 | .800 | 13 | – | 3 | .813 |
| Kansas | 12 | – | 4 | .750 | 15 | – | 5 | .750 |
| Oklahoma | 8 | – | 8 | .500 | 9 | – | 9 | .500 |
| Missouri | 7 | – | 9 | .438 | 7 | – | 11 | .389 |
| Nebraska | 3 | – | 7 | .300 | 6 | – | 12 | .333 |
| Kansas State | 4 | – | 12 | .250 | 5 | – | 15 | .250 |

1934–35 Big Ten Conference men's basketball standings
| | Conf. | | | | Overall |
| Team | W | | L | PCT | W | | L | PCT |
|---|---|---|---|---|---|---|---|---|
| Purdue | 9 | – | 3 | .750 | 17 | – | 3 | .850 |
| Illinois | 9 | – | 3 | .750 | 15 | – | 5 | .750 |
| Wisconsin | 9 | – | 3 | .750 | 15 | – | 5 | .750 |
| Indiana | 8 | – | 4 | .667 | 14 | – | 6 | .700 |
| Ohio State | 8 | – | 4 | .667 | 13 | – | 6 | .684 |
| Iowa | 6 | – | 6 | .500 | 10 | – | 9 | .526 |
| Minnesota | 5 | – | 7 | .417 | 11 | – | 9 | .550 |
| Northwestern | 3 | – | 9 | .250 | 10 | – | 10 | .500 |
| Michigan | 2 | – | 10 | .167 | 8 | – | 12 | .400 |
| Chicago | 1 | – | 11 | .083 | 2 | – | 18 | .100 |

1934–35 Border Conference men's basketball standings
| | Conf. | | | | Overall |
| Team | W | | L | PCT | W | | L | PCT |
|---|---|---|---|---|---|---|---|---|
| Texas Tech | 9 | – | 1 | .900 | 15 | – | 9 | .625 |
| Arizona State–Flagstaff | 10 | – | 4 | .714 | 12 | – | 8 | .600 |
| New Mexico | 7 | – | 9 | .438 | 10 | – | 10 | .500 |
| Arizona | 5 | – | 7 | .417 | 11 | – | 8 | .579 |
| New Mexico A&M | 4 | – | 6 | .400 | 12 | – | 6 | .667 |
| Arizona State–Tempe | 3 | – | 9 | .250 | 8 | – | 11 | .421 |

1934–35 Eastern Intercollegiate Basketball League standings
| | Conf. | | | | Overall |
| Team | W | | L | PCT | W | | L | PCT |
|---|---|---|---|---|---|---|---|---|
| Penn† | 10 | – | 2 | .833 | 16 | – | 4 | .800 |
| Columbia | 10 | – | 2 | .833 | 13 | – | 6 | .684 |
| Dartmouth | 7 | – | 5 | .583 | 12 | – | 9 | .571 |
| Yale | 5 | – | 7 | .417 | 11 | – | 10 | .524 |
| Princeton | 4 | – | 8 | .333 | 6 | – | 14 | .300 |
| Harvard | 3 | – | 9 | .250 | 7 | – | 12 | .368 |
| Cornell | 3 | – | 9 | .250 | 5 | – | 15 | .250 |
† Conference championship winner

1934–35 Eastern Intercollegiate Conference men's basketball standings
| | Conf. | | | | Overall |
| Team | W | | L | PCT | W | | L | PCT |
|---|---|---|---|---|---|---|---|---|
| Pittsburgh† | 6 | – | 2 | .750 | 18 | – | 6 | .750 |
| West Virginia | 6 | – | 2 | .750 | 16 | – | 6 | .727 |
| Temple | 5 | – | 3 | .625 | 17 | – | 7 | .708 |
| Carnegie Tech | 2 | – | 6 | .250 | 3 | – | 6 | .333 |
| Georgetown | 1 | – | 7 | .125 | 6 | – | 13 | .316 |
† Postseason conference championship playoff game winner

1934–35 Missouri Valley Conference men's basketball standings
| | Conf. | | | | Overall |
| Team | W | | L | PCT | W | | L | PCT |
|---|---|---|---|---|---|---|---|---|
| Creighton | 8 | – | 4 | .667 | 12 | – | 8 | .600 |
| Drake | 8 | – | 4 | .667 | 14 | – | 11 | .560 |
| Grinnell | 7 | – | 5 | .583 | 11 | – | 8 | .579 |
| Washington University | 6 | – | 6 | .500 | 7 | – | 11 | .389 |
| Oklahoma A&M | 5 | – | 7 | .417 | 9 | – | 9 | .500 |
| Washburn | 5 | – | 7 | .417 | 7 | – | 13 | .350 |
| Tulsa | 3 | – | 9 | .250 | 6 | – | 10 | .375 |

1934–35 Pacific Coast Conference men's basketball standings
| | Conf. | | | | Overall |
| Team | W | | L | PCT | W | | L | PCT |
|---|---|---|---|---|---|---|---|---|
North
| Oregon State | 12 | – | 4 | .750 | 19 | – | 9 | .679 |
| Washington | 11 | – | 5 | .688 | 16 | – | 8 | .667 |
| Oregon | 7 | – | 9 | .438 | 16 | – | 12 | .571 |
| Washington State | 6 | – | 10 | .375 | 12 | – | 12 | .500 |
| Idaho | 4 | – | 12 | .250 | 11 | – | 16 | .407 |
South
| USC † | 11 | – | 1 | .917 | 20 | – | 6 | .769 |
| California | 5 | – | 7 | .417 | 11 | – | 14 | .440 |
| Stanford | 4 | – | 8 | .333 | 9 | – | 18 | .333 |
| UCLA | 4 | – | 8 | .333 | 11 | – | 12 | .478 |
† Conference playoff series winner

1934–35 Rocky Mountain Conference men's basketball standings
| | Conf. | | | | Overall |
| Team | W | | L | PCT | W | | L | PCT |
|---|---|---|---|---|---|---|---|---|
Eastern
| Northern Colorado† | 9 | – | 3 | .750 | 12 | – | 14 | .462 |
| Wyoming | 10 | – | 4 | .714 | 11 | – | 5 | .688 |
| Colorado College | 9 | – | 5 | .643 | 13 | – | 10 | .565 |
| Denver | 7 | – | 5 | .583 | 13 | – | 7 | .650 |
| Colorado Agricultural | 6 | – | 6 | .500 | 6 | – | 6 | .500 |
| Western State | 3 | – | 7 | .300 | 3 | – | 7 | .300 |
| Colorado | 3 | – | 9 | .250 | 3 | – | 9 | .250 |
| Colorado Mines | 3 | – | 11 | .214 | 3 | – | 11 | .214 |
Western
| Utah State† | 9 | – | 3 | .750 | 17 | – | 5 | .773 |
| BYU | 6 | – | 6 | .500 | 18 | – | 10 | .643 |
| Utah | 5 | – | 7 | .417 | 10 | – | 9 | .526 |
| Montana State | 4 | – | 8 | .333 | 16 | – | 13 | .552 |
† Division championship winner

1934–35 Southeastern Conference men's basketball standings
| | Conf. | | | | Overall |
| Team | W | | L | PCT | W | | L | PCT |
|---|---|---|---|---|---|---|---|---|
| LSU † | 12 | – | 0 | 1.000 | 14 | – | 1 | .933 |
| Kentucky † | 11 | – | 0 | 1.000 | 19 | – | 2 | .905 |
| Tennessee | 7 | – | 4 | .636 | 11 | – | 5 | .688 |
| Vanderbilt | 9 | – | 6 | .600 | 9 | – | 11 | .450 |
| Florida | 4 | – | 3 | .571 | 8 | – | 7 | .533 |
| Alabama | 8 | – | 7 | .533 | 9 | – | 8 | .529 |
| Mississippi State | 5 | – | 5 | .500 | 12 | – | 6 | .667 |
| Georgia Tech | 5 | – | 6 | .455 | 6 | – | 8 | .429 |
| Georgia | 4 | – | 5 | .444 | 12 | – | 8 | .600 |
| Ole Miss | 5 | – | 7 | .417 | 8 | – | 10 | .444 |
| Auburn | 3 | – | 9 | .250 | 4 | – | 13 | .235 |
| Sewanee | 1 | – | 7 | .125 | 2 | – | 12 | .143 |
| Tulane | 1 | – | 16 | .059 | 1 | – | 16 | .059 |
† Conference co-championship winner

1934–35 Southern Conference men's basketball standings
| | Conf. | | | | Overall |
| Team | W | | L | PCT | W | | L | PCT |
|---|---|---|---|---|---|---|---|---|
| North Carolina † | 12 | – | 1 | .923 | 23 | – | 2 | .920 |
| Clemson | 3 | – | 1 | .750 | 15 | – | 3 | .833 |
| Duke | 10 | – | 4 | .714 | 18 | – | 8 | .692 |
| Virginia | 7 | – | 5 | .583 | 13 | – | 9 | .591 |
| Maryland | 4 | – | 3 | .571 | 8 | – | 10 | .444 |
| North Carolina State | 6 | – | 5 | .545 | 10 | – | 9 | .526 |
| South Carolina | 5 | – | 7 | .417 | 15 | – | 9 | .625 |
| Washington and Lee | 4 | – | 8 | .333 | 10 | – | 10 | .500 |
| VMI | 2 | – | 9 | .182 | 3 | – | 14 | .176 |
| Virginia Tech | 1 | – | 11 | .083 | 3 | – | 16 | .158 |
† Southern Conference Tournament winner

1934–35 Southwest Conference men's basketball standings
| | Conf. | | | | Overall |
| Team | W | | L | PCT | W | | L | PCT |
|---|---|---|---|---|---|---|---|---|
| Rice | 9 | – | 3 | .750 | 20 | – | 3 | .870 |
| SMU | 9 | – | 3 | .750 | 14 | – | 3 | .824 |
| Arkansas | 9 | – | 3 | .750 | 14 | – | 5 | .737 |
| Texas | 5 | – | 7 | .417 | 16 | – | 7 | .696 |
| Texas A&M | 4 | – | 8 | .333 | 10 | – | 10 | .500 |
| Baylor | 4 | – | 8 | .333 | 8 | – | 9 | .471 |
| TCU | 2 | – | 10 | .167 | 6 | – | 13 | .316 |

=== Major independents ===
A total of 69 college teams played as major independents. Richmond (20–0) was undefeated. LIU (24–2) and Western Kentucky State (24–3) finished with the most wins.

1934–35 NCAA men's basketball independents standings
| | Conf. | | | | Overall |
| Team | W | | L | PCT | W | | L | PCT |
|---|---|---|---|---|---|---|---|---|
| Richmond | | – | | – | 20 | – | 0 | 1.000 |
| Duquesne | | – | | – | 18 | – | 1 | .947 |
| New York University | | – | | – | 18 | – | 1 | .947 |
| DePaul | | – | | – | 15 | – | 1 | .938 |
| LIU | | – | | – | 24 | – | 2 | .923 |
| Ohio Wesleyan | | – | | – | 17 | – | 2 | .895 |
| Western Kentucky State | | – | | – | 24 | – | 3 | .889 |
| Syracuse | | – | | – | 15 | – | 2 | .882 |
| Canisius | | – | | – | 14 | – | 2 | .875 |
| Cincinnati | | – | | – | 16 | – | 3 | .842 |
| Westminster (Pa.) | | – | | – | 22 | – | 5 | .815 |
| Navy | | – | | – | 13 | – | 3 | .813 |
| Rutgers | | – | | – | 13 | – | 3 | .813 |
| Toledo | | – | | – | 13 | – | 3 | .813 |
| St. Joseph's | | – | | – | 12 | – | 3 | .800 |
| Michigan State Normal | | – | | – | 14 | – | 4 | .778 |
| Xavier | | – | | – | 14 | – | 4 | .778 |
| Providence | | – | | – | 17 | – | 5 | .773 |
| Indiana State | | – | | – | 13 | – | 4 | .765 |
| Muhlenberg | | – | | – | 14 | – | 5 | .737 |
| Saint Mary's (Calif.) | | – | | – | 14 | – | 5 | .737 |
| La Salle | | – | | – | 15 | – | 6 | .714 |
| Brown | | – | | – | 12 | – | 5 | .706 |
| Santa Clara | | – | | – | 12 | – | 5 | .706 |
| George Washington | | – | | – | 14 | – | 6 | .700 |
| Springfield (Mass.) | | – | | – | 14 | – | 6 | .700 |
| Saint Louis | | – | | – | 11 | – | 5 | .688 |
| Western State Teachers | | – | | – | 11 | – | 5 | .688 |
| Manhattan | | – | | – | 13 | – | 6 | .684 |
| Niagara | | – | | – | 13 | – | 6 | .684 |
| Army | | – | | – | 10 | – | 5 | .667 |
| Rhode Island State | | – | | – | 12 | – | 6 | .667 |
| William & Mary | | – | | – | 10 | – | 5 | .667 |
| Butler | | – | | – | 13 | – | 7 | .650 |
| Villanova | | – | | – | 13 | – | 7 | .650 |
| CCNY | | – | | – | 10 | – | 6 | .625 |
| St. John's (N.Y.) | | – | | – | 13 | – | 8 | .619 |
| Marquette | | – | | – | 11 | – | 7 | .611 |
| Marshall | | – | | – | 12 | – | 8 | .600 |
| Notre Dame | | – | | – | 13 | – | 9 | .591 |
| Kent State | | – | | – | 8 | – | 6 | .571 |
| Davidson | | – | | – | 13 | – | 10 | .565 |
| Ohio | | – | | – | 11 | – | 9 | .550 |
| Furman | | – | | – | 9 | – | 8 | .529 |
| Loyola (Md.) | | – | | – | 9 | – | 9 | .500 |
| Saint Francis (N.Y.) | | – | | – | 12 | – | 12 | .500 |
| Penn State | | – | | – | 8 | – | 9 | .471 |
| Connecticut | | – | | – | 7 | – | 8 | .467 |
| Fordham | | – | | – | 7 | – | 9 | .438 |
| Bowling Green State | | – | | – | 6 | – | 9 | .400 |
| The Citadel | | – | | – | 6 | – | 9 | .400 |
| Colgate | | – | | – | 8 | – | 13 | .381 |
| Wake Forest | | – | | – | 6 | – | 10 | .375 |
| Louisville | | – | | – | 5 | – | 9 | .357 |
| Wichita Municipal | | – | | – | 7 | – | 13 | .350 |
| Lafayette | | – | | – | 5 | – | 10 | .333 |
| San Francisco | | – | | – | 7 | – | 14 | .333 |
| Detroit | | – | | – | 4 | – | 10 | .286 |
| Lehigh | | – | | – | 4 | – | 10 | .286 |
| Dayton | | – | | – | 4 | – | 11 | .267 |
| Seton Hall | | – | | – | 4 | – | 11 | .267 |
| Loyola (Ill.) | | – | | – | 5 | – | 14 | .263 |
| Montana | | – | | – | 6 | – | 18 | .250 |
| Miami (Ohio) | | – | | – | 3 | – | 12 | .200 |
| St. Bonaventure | | – | | – | 1 | – | 5 | .167 |
| Valparaiso | | – | | – | 2 | – | 13 | .133 |
| Boston University | | – | | – | 2 | – | 14 | .125 |
| Bradley | | – | | – | 1 | – | 13 | .071 |
| Bucknell | | – | | – | 0 | – | 14 | .000 |

== Postseason ==
The American Legion sponsored a postseason game on April 13 at the Convention Hall in Atlantic City, New Jersey as a feature of the city's Palm Sunday festivities. The intersectional contest was modeled after college football's famous east vs. west Rose Bowl. Eastern Intercollegiate Conference champion Pittsburgh was invited as the eastern representative, while SEC co-champion LSU represented the south.

The game was billed as "for the national collegiate championship" and was expected to attract up to 20,000 fans. LSU came from behind to beat Pittsburgh 41–37 in front of a disappointing 5,000 attendees. The Tigers claim a national championship based on the victory.

== Awards ==
=== Consensus All-American team ===
Consensus Team
| Player | Class | Team |
|---|---|---|
| Omar Browning | Senior | Oklahoma |
| Claire Cribbs | Senior | Pittsburgh |
| Leroy Edwards | Sophomore | Kentucky |
| Jack Gray | Senior | Texas |
| Lee Guttero | Senior | USC |

=== Major player of the year awards ===
- Helms Player of the Year: Leroy Edwards, Kentucky (retroactive selection in 1944)

== Coaching changes ==
A number of teams changed coaches during the season and after it ended.

| Team | Former coach | Interim coach | New coach | Reason |
|---|---|---|---|---|
| Arizona State–Tempe | Rudy Lavik | | Earl Pomeroy | Lavik with the school to continue coaching the football program and his athletic director duties. |
| Boston University | John Harmon | | Mel Collard | Harmon stepped down to take over as the athletic director of Boston University. |
| BYU | G. Ott Romney | | Eddie Kimball | |
| The Citadel | Charlie Willard | | Rock Norman | |
| Colgate | Robert C. Hubbard | | John Galloway | |
| Colorado | Dutch Clark | | Frosty Cox | |
| Colorado Agricultural | Saaly Salwachter | | Sam Campbell | |
| Creighton | Arthur Schabinger | | Eddie Hickey | |
| Dayton | Louis Tschudi | | Joe Holsinger | |
| Furman | Flucie Stewart | | Bob Smith | Stewart left to coach at Appalachian State. |
| George Washington | Jim Pixlee & Logan Wilson | | William Reinhart | |
| Kent State | Gus Peterka | | Donald Starn | |
| Lafayette | Herbert A. Lorenz | | P. M. Shellenberger | |
| Marshall | Tom Dandelet | | Cam Henderson | |
| Mississippi State | Edwin Hale | | Frank Carideo | |
| Montana State | Schubert R. Dyche | | Brick Breeden | |
| North Carolina | Bo Shepard | | Walter Skidmore | |
| Ole Miss | Ed Walker | | George Bohler | |
| Oregon | Bill Reinhart | | Howard Hobson | |
| Princeton | John Jefferies | | Kenneth Fairman | |
| Santa Clara | Harlan Dykes | | George Barsi | |
| South Carolina | Rock Norman | | Ted Petoskey | Norman left to coach at The Citadel |
| Tennessee | W. H. Britton | | Blair Gullion | |
| Texas A&M | John B. Reid | | Herb McQuillan | |
| Texas Tech | Virgil Ballard | | Berl Huffman | |
| Wichita Municipal | Lindsay Austin | | Bill Hennigh | |
| Yale | Elmer Ripley | | Ken Loeffler | |
