= Schoonderlogt estate =

17th century country house in Elst, Netherlands

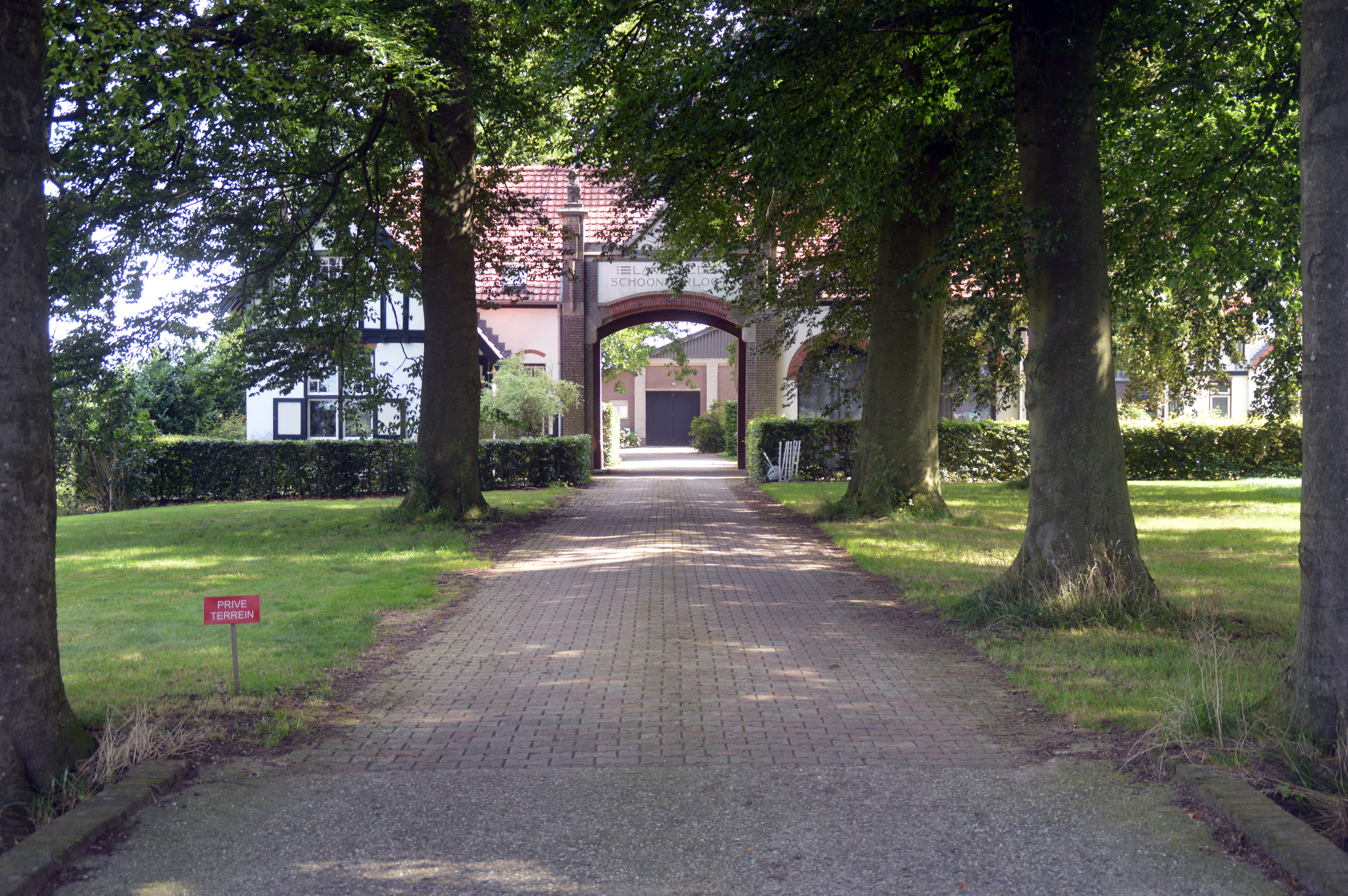
- Schoonderlogt entrance gate
- Interactive map of Schoonderlogt estate
- Town/City: Elst
- Province: Gelderland
- Country: Netherlands

Schoonderlogt estate is a 17th century country house in Elst, Netherlands.

== History ==
The original farm was demolished around 1900 by its owner, Gaymans, who built the present country house. In addition to the country house, a farm and barn were also built.

Schoonderlogt played a role in World War II, when it became the headquarters of 2nd Battalion of the U.S. Army's 506th Parachute Infantry Regiment. Together with the 501th and 502th P.I.R Regiment, the 327 Glider Infantry Regiment and other additional military units, they formed the American 101st Airborne Division, who landed 17 September 1944 at Eindhoven.

During the Battle of the Island, Schoonderlogt farm was temporary HQ of the 506th PIR. There's a well known picture of Major Richard D. Winters in front of the entrance gate.

Schoonderlogt plays a role in the miniseries Band of Brothers. As a side effect, Schoonderlogt receives a few thousands of tourists a year, even though the estate is private property and not publicly accessible.

In front of the estate a Memorial 101st Airborne Division 506 P.I.R was placed in 2020.

== Gallery ==
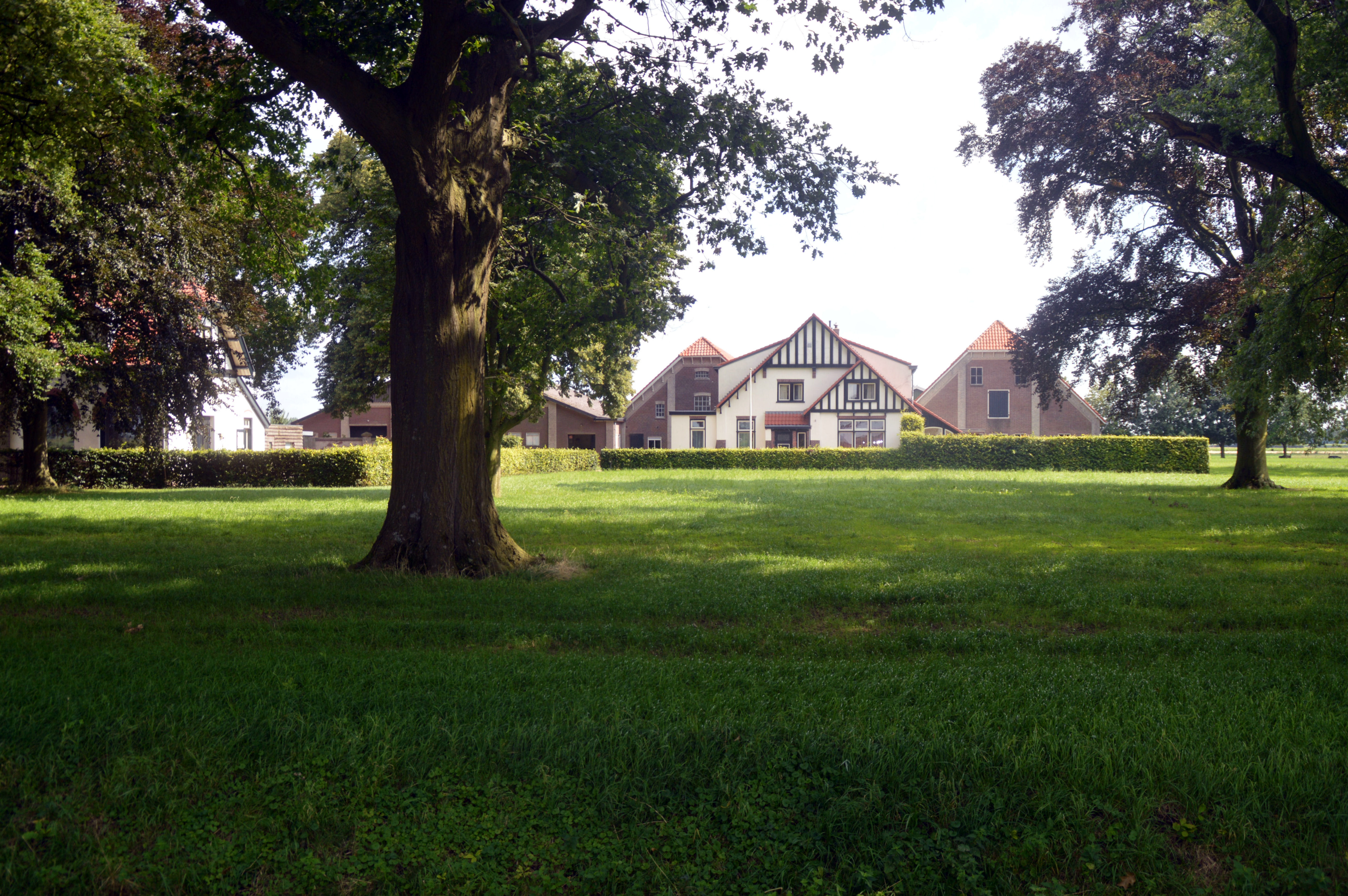
Schoonderlogt estate and farm

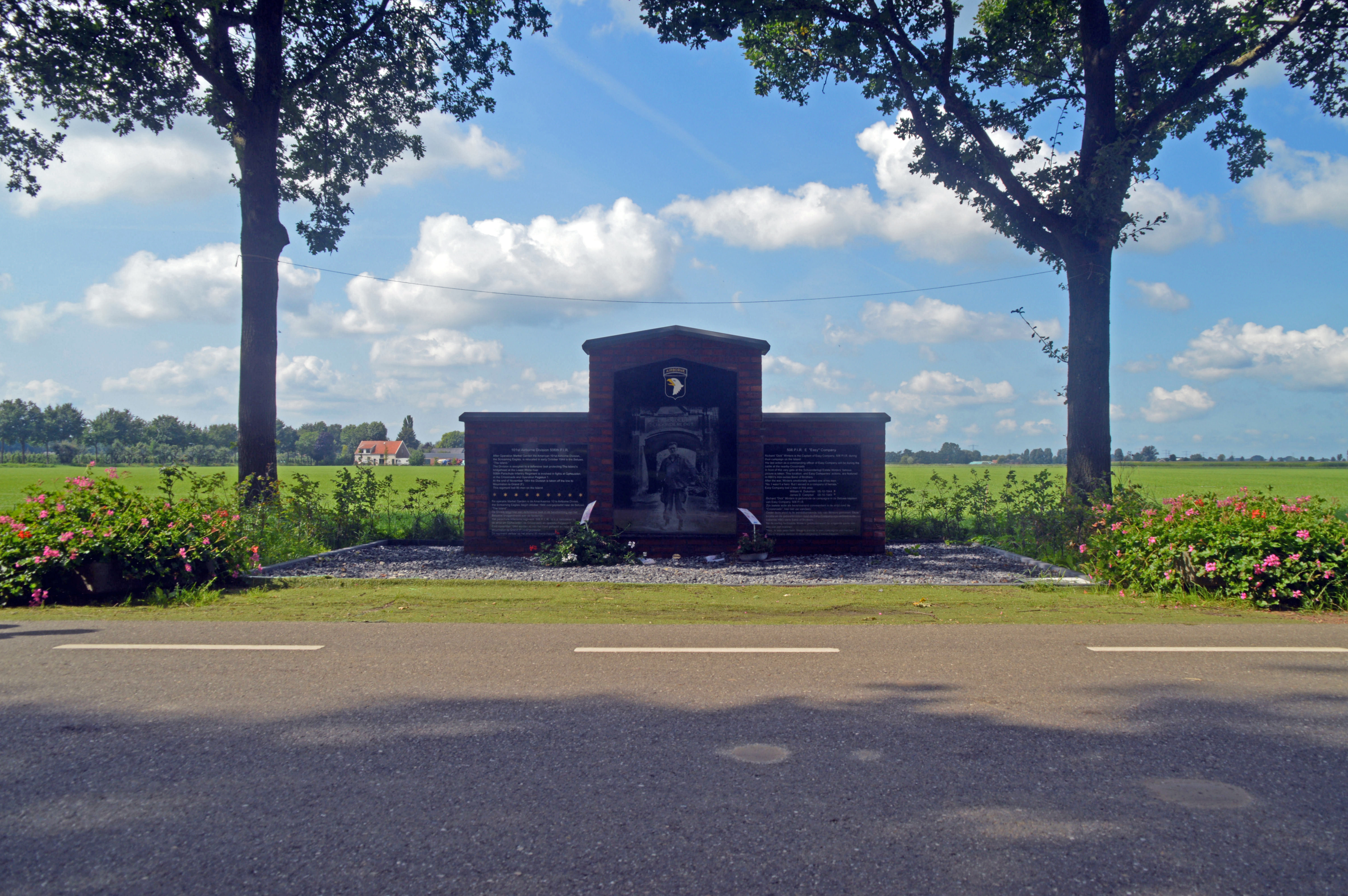
Memorial 101st Airborne Division 506 P.I.R

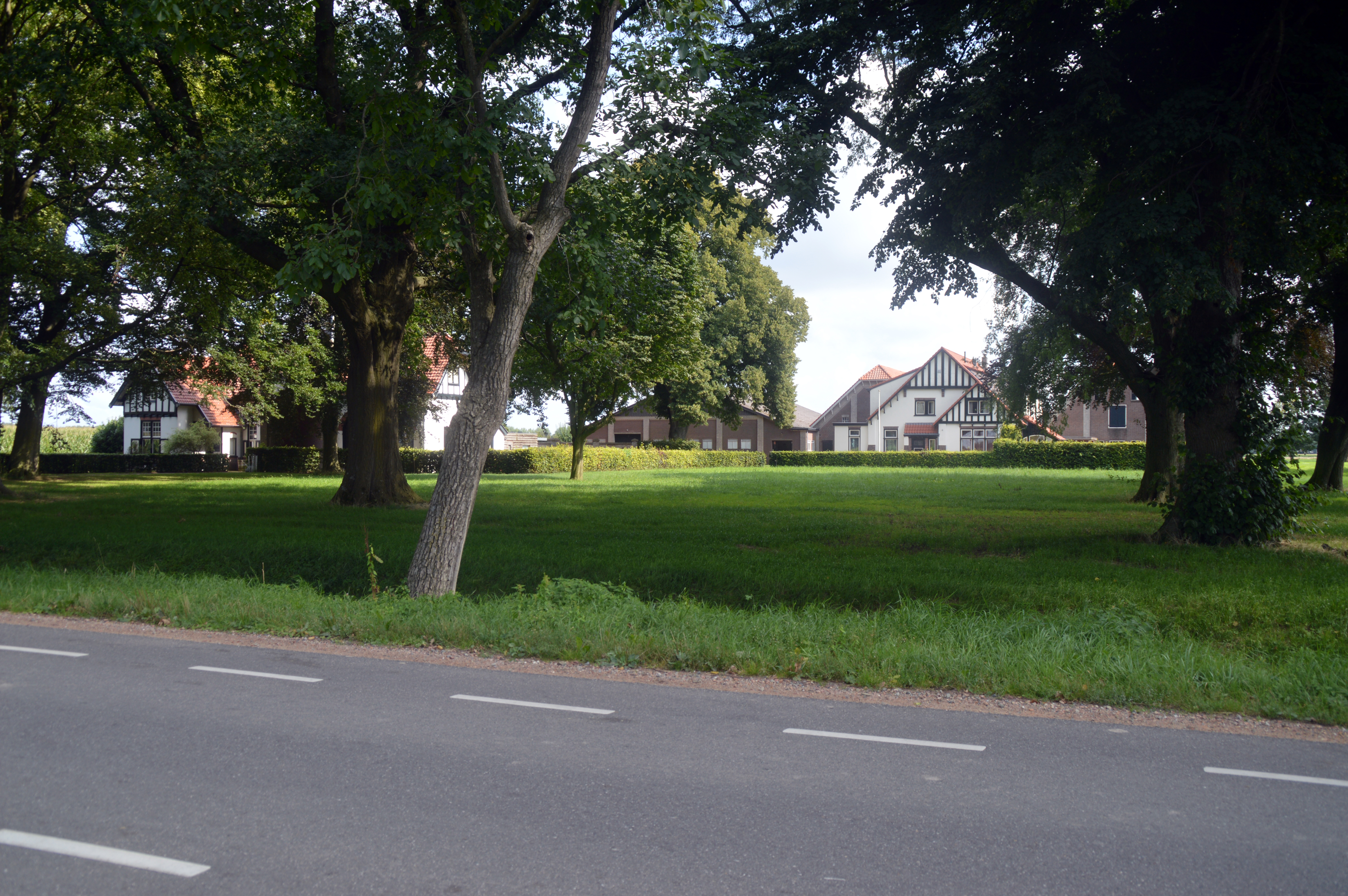
Schoonderlogt Estate. Seen from the road
