= 1934–35 Iowa State Cyclones men's basketball team =

American college basketball season

1934–35 Iowa State Cyclones men's basketball

Big Six Champions
- Conference: Big Six Conference
- Record: 13–3 (8–2 Big Six)
- Head coach: Louis Menze (7th season)
- Home arena: State Gymnasium

1934–35 Big Six Conference men's basketball standings
	Conf.				Overall
Team	W		L	PCT	W		L	PCT
Iowa State	8	–	2	.800	13	–	3	.813
Kansas	12	–	4	.750	15	–	5	.750
Oklahoma	8	–	8	.500	9	–	9	.500
Missouri	7	–	9	.438	7	–	11	.389
Nebraska	3	–	7	.300	6	–	12	.333
Kansas State	4	–	12	.250	5	–	15	.250

The 1934–35 Iowa State Cyclones men's basketball team represented Iowa State University during the 1934–35 NCAA men's basketball season. The Cyclones were coached by Louis Menze, who was in his seventh season with the Cyclones. They played their home games at the State Gymnasium in Ames, Iowa.

They finished the season 13–3, 8–2 in Big Six play to finish in first place. It was Iowa State's first Big Six Championship.

== Roster ==
1934–35 Iowa State Cyclones men's basketball team
Players
Coaches

Pos.	#	Name	Height	Weight	Year	Hometown
F		Harlan Anderson	—	—		Cannon Falls, Minnesota
G		Weldon Brown	—	—		Boone, Iowa
F		Jack Cowen	—	—	Jr
G		John Cowan	—	—
F		Jack Flemming	—	—	So	Spirit Lake, Iowa
G		Torvald Holmes	—	—	Jr
G		Frank Hood (C)	—	—
G		Don Perkins	—	—		Des Moines, Iowa
F		Dick Sweitzer	—	—
C		Burton Thomson	—	—		Boone, Iowa
C	14	Waldo Wegner	—	—	Sr

Head coach

- Louis Menze

Assistant coach(es)

Legend

- (C) Team captain
- (S) Suspended
- (I) Ineligible
- (W) Walk-on
- Injured
- Current redshirt

== Schedule and results ==
Date time, TV	Rank^{#}	Opponent^{#}	Result	Record	Site city, state
Regular season
December 7, 1934*		Coe	W 36–23	1–0	State Gymnasium; Ames, Iowa
December 11, 1934*		at Coe	W 30–26	2–0	Cedar Rapids, Iowa
December 14, 1934*		Grinnell	W 32–26	3–0	State Gymnasium; Ames, Iowa
December 20, 1934*		at Drake; Iowa Big Four	W 28–27	4–0	Drake Fieldhouse; Des Moines, Iowa
January 1, 1935*		Iowa; Cy-Hawk Rivalry	W 41–33	5–0	State Gymnasium; Ames, Iowa
January 4, 1935		Missouri	W 31–23	6–0 (1–0)	State Gymnasium; Ames, Iowa
January 12, 1935		at Nebraska	L 31–32	6–1 (1–1)	Nebraska Coliseum; Lincoln, Nebraska
January 14, 1935		at Kansas State	W 29–25	7–1 (2–1)	Nichols Hall; Manhattan, Kansas
January 26, 1935		at Missouri	W 37–28	8–1 (3–1)	Brewer Fieldhouse; Columbia, Missouri
February 4, 1935		Oklahoma	W 32–22	9–1 (4–1)	State Gymnasium; Ames, Iowa
February 9, 1935		at Kansas	L 18–35	9–2 (4–2)	Hoch Auditorium; Lawrence, Kansas
February 11, 1935		at Oklahoma	W 50–44 ^{OT}	10–2 (5–2)	OU Field House; Norman, Oklahoma
February 15, 1935*; 7:30 pm		Drake; Iowa Big Four	L 42–45	10–3	State Gymnasium; Ames, Iowa
February 18, 1935		Kansas	W 32–30	11–3 (6–2)	State Gymnasium; Ames, Iowa
February 23, 1935		Nebraska	W 22–14	12–3 (7–2)	State Gymnasium; Ames, Iowa
March 4, 1935; 7:15 pm		Kansas State	W 39–31	13–3 (8–2)	State Gymnasium (3,600); Ames, Iowa
*Non-conference game. ^{#}Rankings from AP poll. (#) Tournament seedings in parentheses. All times are in Central Time.
