= 1934–35 Cincinnati Bearcats men's basketball team =

American college basketball season

1934–35 Cincinnati Bearcats men's basketball
- Conference: Buckeye Athletic Association
- Record: 16–3 (6–2 BAA)
- Head coach: Tay Brown (2nd season)
- Captain: Carl Austing
- Home arena: Schmidlapp Gymnasium

The 1934–35 Cincinnati Bearcats men's basketball team represented the University of Cincinnati during the 1934–35 NCAA men's basketball season. The head coach was Tay Brown, who was in his second season with the Bearcats. The team finished with an overall record of 16–3.

== Schedule ==
Date time, TV	Opponent	Result	Record	Site city, state
December 12	Hanover	W 48–34	1–0	Schmidlapp Gymnasium; Cincinnati, OH
December 15	Wilmington	W 50–18	2–0	Schmidlapp Gymnasium; Cincinnati, OH
December 19	Dayton	W 49–18	3–0	Schmidlapp Gymnasium; Cincinnati, OH
December 21	KY. Wesleyan	W 48–18	4–0	Schmidlapp Gymnasium; Cincinnati, OH
December 31	Vanderbilt	W 47–20	5–0	Schmidlapp Gymnasium; Cincinnati, OH
January 4	at Western Kentucky	W 26–25	6–0	Health & Physical Education Building; Bowling Green, KY
January 5	at Vanderbilt	W 46–20	7–0	Old Gym; Nashville, TN
January 8	Indianapolis	W 37–32	8–0	Schmidlapp Gymnasium; Cincinnati, OH
January 12	at Marshall	W 50–40	9–0	Huntington, WV
January 15	at Hanover	W 42–35	10–0	Hanover, IN
January 19	Miami (OH)	W 40–30	11–0	Schmidlapp Gymnasium; Cincinnati, OH
January 22	Ohio Wesleyan	L 39–41 ^{2OT}	11–1	Schmidlapp Gymnasium; Cincinnati, OH
January 26	Ohio Bobcats	W 43–38	12–1	Schmidlapp Gymnasium; Cincinnati, OH
January 30	at Indianapolis	L 22–37	12–2	Indianapolis, IN
February 6	at Loyola	W 37–23	13–2	Alumni Gym; Chicago, IL
February 9	at Miami (OH)	W 33–23	14–2	Oxford, OH
February 12	at Ohio	W 39–33	15–2	Men's Gymnasium; Athens, OH
February 15	Marshall	W 48–27	16–2	Schmidlapp Gymnasium; Cincinnati, OH
February 22	at Ohio Wesleyan	L 21–33	16–3	Delaware, OH
*Non-conference game. (#) Tournament seedings in parentheses.
