= Pick Dehner =

American basketball player and coach (1914–1987)

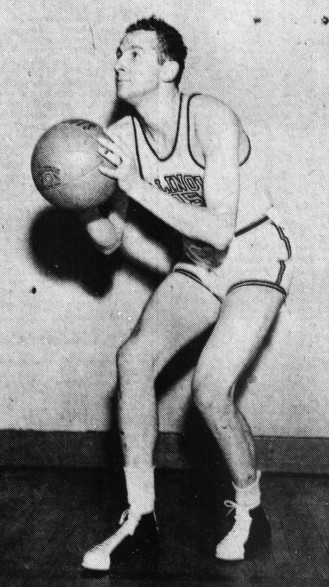
- Dehner, circa 1938

Personal information
- Born: August 29, 1914 Lincoln, Illinois, U.S.
- Died: April 7, 1987 (aged 72) Belleville, Illinois, U.S.
- Listed height: 6 ft 4 in (1.93 m)

Career information
- High school: Lincoln (Lincoln, Illinois)
- College: Illinois (1934–1935, 1937–1939)
- Position: Power forward / center
- Coaching career: 1942–1974

Career history

Playing
- 1938–1939: Hammond Ciesar All-Americans

Coaching
- 1942–1974: East St. Louis HS

Career highlights
- First-team All-American – MSG (1939); 2× Third-team All-American – Converse (1938, 1939); First-team All-Big Ten (1939)

Louis "Pick" Dehner, sometimes stylized as "Lewis," (August 29, 1914 – April 7, 1987) was an American basketball player and high school coach. He was an All-American player at the University of Illinois, played professionally in the United States National Basketball League, and won over 500 games as the coach for East St. Louis High School in Illinois.

Dehner was born and raised in Lincoln, Illinois. A 6'4" forward/center, he played for Illinois in the 1934–35 season, then returned to play for the Illini from 1937 to 1939. He was a two-time All-American for the Illini, and scored a then-record 25 points at Madison Square Garden on December 27, 1938. Following graduation, he played professionally for the Hammond Ciesar All-Americans of the National Basketball League (NBL), a forerunner to today's National Basketball Association.

Following the close of his professional career, Dehner became a highly successful high school coach. From 1942 until 1974, Dehner was head boys' basketball coach for East St. Louis High School, compiling a record of 549–350. In 1973, he was named to the Illinois Basketball Coaches inaugural Hall of Fame class.

His son is Louis Powell Dehner, M.D., an internationally renowned pathologist

Dehner died on April 7, 1987, of pancreatic cancer at the age of 72.
