= 1934–35 Indiana Hoosiers men's basketball team =

American college basketball season

1934–35 Indiana Hoosiers men's basketball
- Conference: Big Ten Conference
- Record: 14–6 (8–4 Big Ten)
- Head coach: Everett Dean (11th season)
- Captain: Willard Kehrt
- Home arena: The Fieldhouse

1934–35 Big Ten Conference men's basketball standings
	Conf.				Overall
Team	W		L	PCT	W		L	PCT
Purdue	9	–	3	.750	17	–	3	.850
Illinois	9	–	3	.750	15	–	5	.750
Wisconsin	9	–	3	.750	15	–	5	.750
Indiana	8	–	4	.667	14	–	6	.700
Ohio State	8	–	4	.667	13	–	6	.684
Iowa	6	–	6	.500	10	–	9	.526
Minnesota	5	–	7	.417	11	–	9	.550
Northwestern	3	–	9	.250	10	–	10	.500
Michigan	2	–	10	.167	8	–	12	.400
Chicago	1	–	11	.083	2	–	18	.100

The 1934–35 Indiana Hoosiers men's basketball team represented Indiana University. Their head coach was Everett Dean, who was in his 11th year. The team played its home games in The Fieldhouse in Bloomington, Indiana, and was a member of the Big Ten Conference.

The Hoosiers finished the regular season with an overall record of 14–6 and a conference record of 8–4, finishing 4th in the Big Ten Conference.

== Roster ==
No.	Name	Position	Ht.	Year	Hometown
3	Ken Gunning	F	5–11	So.	Shelbyville, Indiana
4	Wendel Walker	G	5–11	Jr.	Vincennes, Indiana
7	Lester Stout	F	5–9	Jr.	Winamac, Indiana
9	Bob Etnire	G/F	5–11	So.	Logansport, Indiana
10	Willis Hosler	C	6–3	So.	Huntington, Indiana
11	Charles Scott	G	6–2	Jr.	Jeffersonville, Indiana
14	Fred Fechtman	C	6–8	So.	Indianapolis, Indiana
N/A	William Baise	G	5–10	N/A	Seymour, Indiana
N/A	Louis Boink	F	6–1	So.	Evansville, Indiana
N/A	George Braman	G	6–1	So.	South Bend, Indiana
N/A	William Coulter	C	6–3	Sr.	Paoli, Indiana
N/A	Russell Grieger	F	6–1	N/A	Wanatah, Indiana
N/A	Floyd Henry	F	5–10	Sr.	Kendallville, Indiana
N/A	Willard Kehrt	F	5–11	Sr.	Shelbyville, Indiana
N/A	Robert Porter	G	6–1	Sr.	Logansport, Indiana
N/A	William Stout	F	6–1	N/A	Bloomington, Indiana

== Schedule/results ==
Date time, TV	Rank^{#}	Opponent^{#}	Result	Record	Site city, state
Regular season
12/7/1934*		Ball State	W 35–19	1–0	The Fieldhouse; Bloomington, IN
12/12/1934*		Hamline	W 31–29	2–0	The Fieldhouse; Bloomington, IN
12/15/1934*		DePauw	L 24–31	2–1	The Fieldhouse; Bloomington, IN
12/20/1934*		at Maryland	W 30–25	3–1	Ritchie Coliseum; College Park, MD
12/21/1934*		at George Washington	W 45–41	4–1	Washington, D.C.
12/22/1934*		at Temple	L 30–50	4–2	Philadelphia, PA
1/1/1935*		at Miami (OH)	W 32–15	5–2	Withrow Court; Oxford, OH
1/5/1935		at Illinois; Rivalry	W 32–28	6–2 (1–0)	Huff Hall; Champaign, IL
1/12/1935		Wisconsin	L 23–30	6–3 (1–1)	The Fieldhouse; Bloomington, IN
1/14/1935		Illinois; Rivalry	W 42–29	7–3 (2–1)	The Fieldhouse; Bloomington, IN
1/19/1935		at Iowa	W 40–35	8–3 (3–1)	Iowa Field House; Iowa City, IA
2/4/1935*		at Vanderbilt	W 39–30	9–3 (3–1)	Old Gym; Nashville, TN
2/9/1935		Minnesota	W 48–23	10–3 (4–1)	The Fieldhouse; Bloomington, IN
2/11/1935		Iowa	W 34–30	11–3 (5–1)	The Fieldhouse; Bloomington, IN
2/16/1935		at Wisconsin	L 27–37	11–4 (5–2)	Wisconsin Field House; Madison, WI
2/18/1935		at Purdue; Rivalry	L 38–44	11–5 (5–3)	Lafayette Jefferson HS Gymnasium; West Lafayette, IN
2/23/1935		Northwestern	W 36–32	12–5 (6–3)	The Fieldhouse; Bloomington, IN
2/25/1935		Purdue; Rivalry	W 41–35	13–5 (7–3)	The Fieldhouse; Bloomington, IN
3/2/1935		at Northwestern	L 22–40	13–6 (7–4)	Old Patten Gymnasium; Evanston, IL
3/9/1935		at Minnesota	W 38–29	14–6 (8–4)	Minnesota Field House; Minneapolis, MN
*Non-conference game. ^{#}Rankings from AP Poll. (#) Tournament seedings in parentheses.
