= Old Gym (Vanderbilt University) =

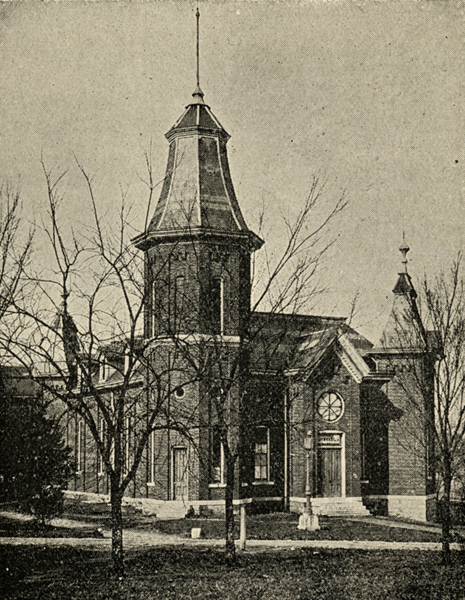
- Old Gym on Vanderbilt University campus
- Interactive map of the Old Gym area

General information
- Architectural style: Victorian
- Location: 2301 West End Ave. Nashville, TN
- Construction started: 1879
- Completed: 1880

Technical details
- Floor count: 3
- Floor area: 11,560 sq ft (1,074 m^{2})

Design and construction
- Architect: Peter J. Williamson (assumed)

- Gymnasium, Vanderbilt University
- U.S. National Register of Historic Places
- Coordinates: 36°8′54″N 86°48′18″W
- Area: 1 acre (0.40 ha)
- Architectural style: Victorian
- NRHP reference No.: 72001233
- Added to NRHP: February 23, 1972

Old Gym is one of the surviving Victorian buildings that characterized the early style of the Vanderbilt University campus in Nashville, Tennessee. The Old Gym was originally a gymnasium, later served as the Fine Arts Building, and currently houses the university's admissions office.

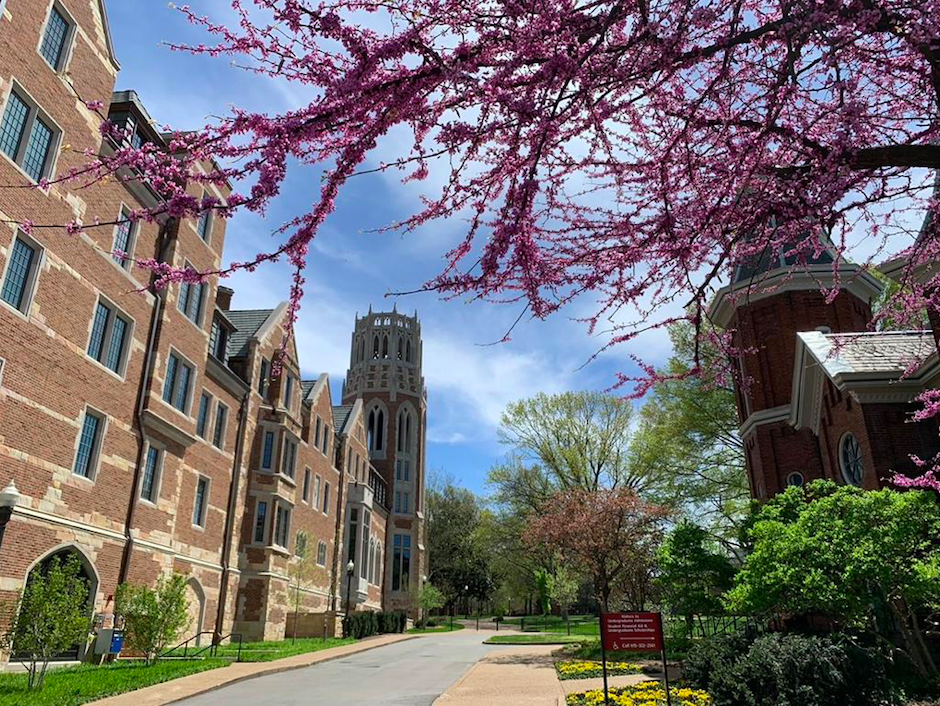
Between Old Gym and E. Bronson Ingram College

== History ==
The gymnasium was completed in 1880 and featured an indoor running track and considerable gymnastic equipment. At the time, it was one of the best equipped gymnasiums in the southern United States. The exterior of the building remains fairly untouched while the interior space has been modified through the years and uses of the building.

The Old Gym is on the National Register of Historic Places. The building consisted of a foundation of Tennessee limestone with a structure of wooden trusses and walls of natural finished red brick. The Mansard roof was covered with slate shingles. Some of the original gymnastic equipment included a leaping rig, a vaulting board, rowing machine, parallel bars, trapeze ropes, Indian clubs, dumb bells and a walnut chest expander.

=== Remodeling ===
In 1962 the Old Gym was renovated and made into the Fine Arts Building by Warfield and Associates. The remodeling project included the removal of the second-floor running track and the addition of heating and cooling throughout the building.
