= Henkie =

Dutch singer (1945–2022)

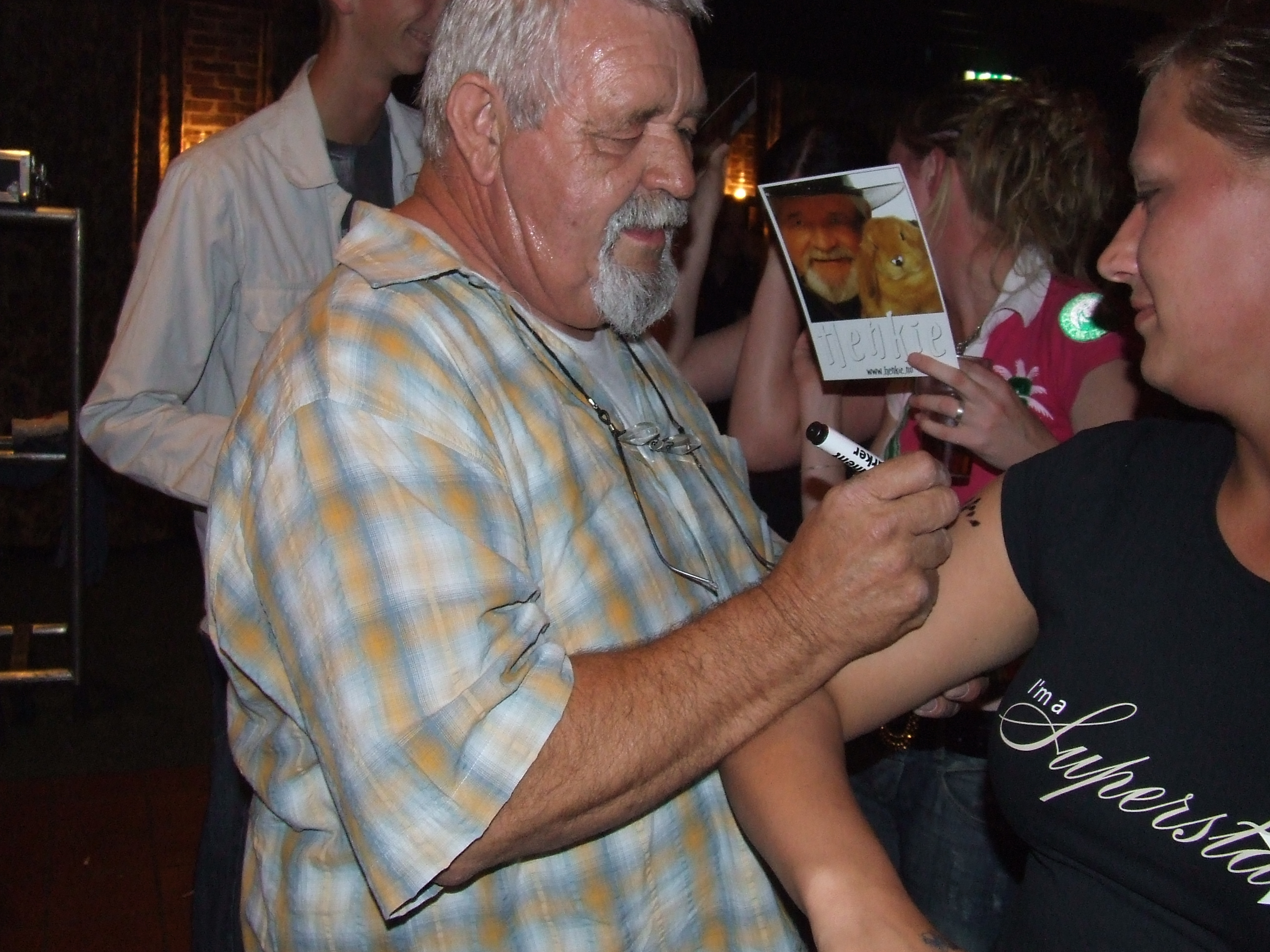

Background information
- Born: 4 December 1945
- Died: 19 July 2022
- Instrument: vocals

Henk Leeuwis (4 December 1945 – 19 July 2022), known as Henkie, was a Dutch singer. Born in Elst, Netherlands, he was famous for his 2006 Belgian chart-topper "Lief Klein Konijntje" and the 2007 single "Mijn Goudvis".

Henkie died on 19 July 2022, at the age of 76.
