= Werenfried of Elst =

Saint Werenfried
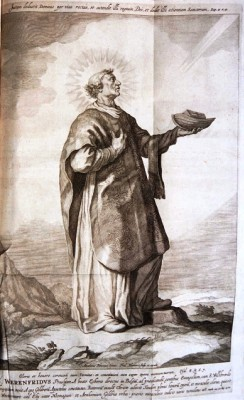
- Born: England
- Died: c. 780; Arnhem, Netherlands
- Feast: 14 August, 28 August or 8 November
- Attributes: Priest who holds a ship containing a coffin
- Patronage: Against gout and stiff joints, for vegetable gardeners Patron saint of Arnheim, Elst and Westervoort in the Netherlands

Saint Werenfried (or Werenfrid, Werenfridus; died c. 780) was an English Benedictine monk, priest and missionary among the Frisians. His intercession is thought to relieve the pain of arthritis and to help gardeners. His feast day is 14 August.

== Life ==
Coat of arms of Overbetuwe showing the saint's coffin floating downstream

Werenfried was a Benedictine monk. He was probably born in Northumbria and spent time in Ireland before becoming a missionary. He worked with Saint Willibrord of Echternach to convert the Frisians to Christianity. He died around 780 at Arnhem, what is now the Netherlands. His coffin was placed in a boat that was washed down the Rhine and came to rest in Elst. The Overbetuwe municipal coat of arms depicts this event.

The tomb of St. Werenfried in the 8th century church in what is now Elst attracted pilgrims who wanted release from arthritic pain, or who wanted to become better gardeners. The church where Werenfridus was originally buried has been called Werenfriduskerk since 1483. Protestants burnt his body in 1588. In 1944 the original Werenfriduskerk was destroyed, but after the Second World War the church was rebuilt. Today a small museum has been set up under the church, because the church appears to have been built on two large Gallo-Roman temples.

== Monks of Ramsgate account ==
The Monks of Ramsgate wrote in their Book of Saints (1921),

Werenfrid (St.) (Aug. 14)
(8th cent.) An Englishman, a fellow-labourer with Saint Willibrord among the Frisians. He died at Arnheim (A.D. 780), miracles testifying to his sanctity.

== Butler's account ==
The hagiographer Alban Butler (1710–1773) wrote in his Lives of the Fathers, Martyrs, and Other Principal Saints, under November 7,

St Werenfrid, Priest and Confessor.
He was an English monk, and, according to Mabillon, accompanied, or, as the Bollandists rather think, followed Saint Willibrord into Friseland, and assisted him in preaching the gospel. Saint Werenfrid planted the faith in the isle or territory of Betawe, or Batavia, in Holland, lying between the Rhine, the Leck, the Maes, and Merve, especially at Elste, a town in that territory, where he was buried. His tomb was famous for pilgrimages, and the miraculous cures of sick persons, especially those afflicted with the gout. Baldericus, the fifteenth bishop of Utrecht, founded there a collegiate church in his honour, with eight canonries. Saint Werenfrid is honoured in Holland on the 14th of August. See his life in Surius, and much more correctly in the Bollandists, on the 28th of August. Also John a Leidis, l.2 c.42. Wilhelmus Heda, p.30. Batavia Sacra, p.42.

== O'Hanlon's account ==
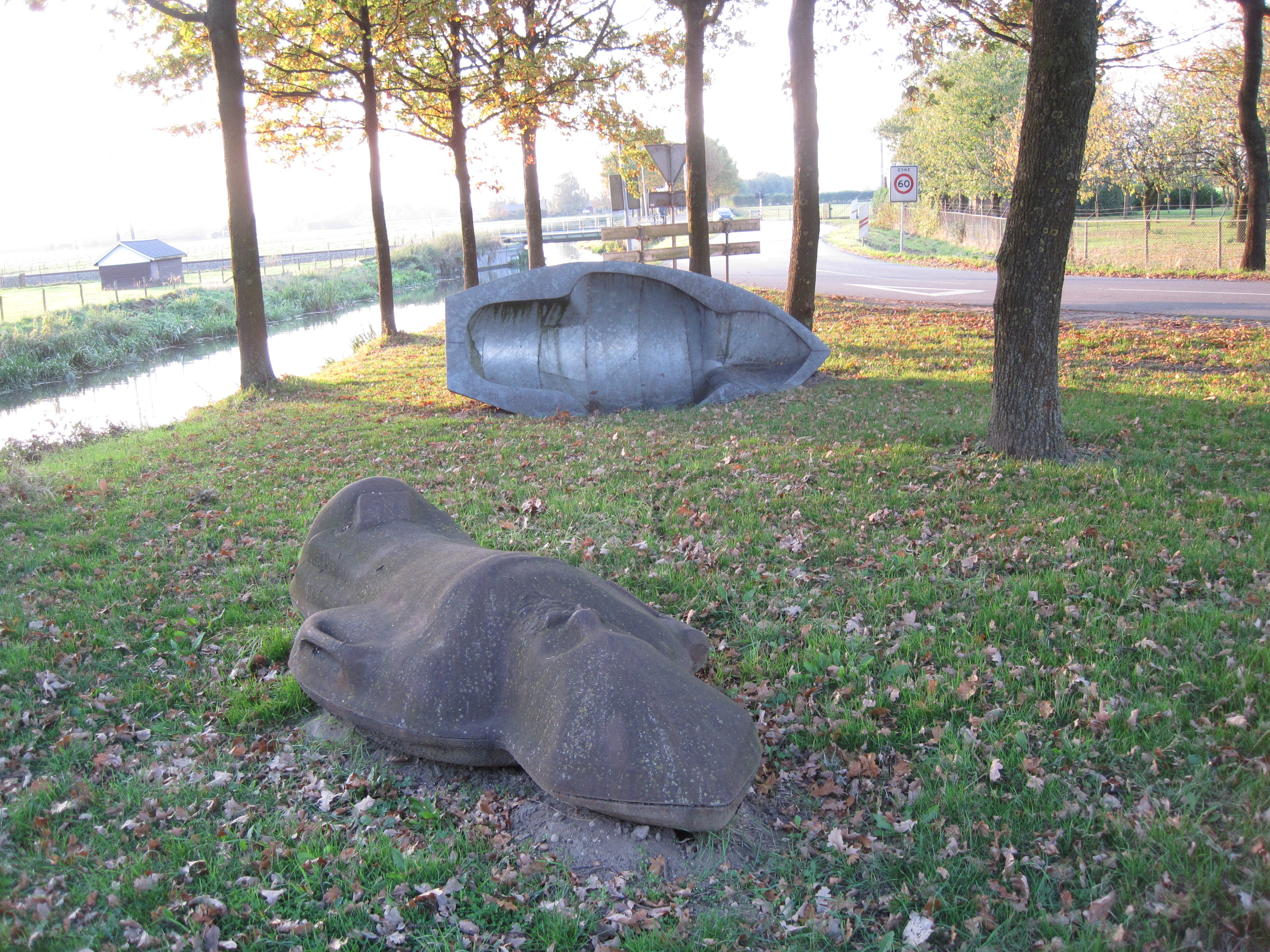
Sculpture "Werenfridus" by Alphons ter Avest in Elst, Overbetuwe

John O'Hanlon (1821–1905) in his Lives of the Irish saints wrote,

St. Werenfrid, Priest and Confessor, Missionary in Frisia. [Eighth Century.]

... He was an Englishman by birth, and probably he was born in the kingdom of Northumbria. For greater improvement in the science of the saints, he forsook country and friends, to dedicate himself wholly to the service of his fellow creatures. He thereupon passed over into Ireland, where he served God in solitude, and recollection. He is said to have been one of those twelve apostolic men belonging to the English nation, who were destined for a missionary career. With their leader St. Willebrord, these were sent out of Ireland by St. Egbert. These were destined to carry the word of life to the Frisons, Saxons, and other pagans in Germany. The exact time of St. Werenfrid's arrival there, is not so well known. He was one of those Gospel preachers, however, to whom the Netherlanders were indebted for their Christian teaching. He particularly planted the faith and church of Christ in the Isle of Batavia or Betuwe. He likewise converted the inhabitants of Medemblick, Durostadt, Elst, and Westerwort. His admirable virtues were very remarkable.

The writer of his Acts assures us, that it was impossible to express how rich he was in all good work, and how careful he had been in administering comfort to the afflicted. He was incomparable for his humanity, while he was an exemplar of charity towards the poor. He was assiduous in his watching, and rigorous in his fasting. He was diligent in prayer, and he excelled in chastity. In fine, he was conspicuous for all good qualities. Great success attended his labours in gaining souls to Christ. In a good old age, he received the reward of his labour. He departed some time in the eighth century. His body was interred at Elst. There formerly stood a collegiate church dedicated to God in his name. This was much frequented, because miracles were often wrought within it. St. Werenfrid's feast is kept as a Double in the diocese of Utrecht, on the 27th day of August. The 14th was the day of his decease, however, according to the best accounts. He is likewise entered in the anonymous Calendar of national saints, at the 14th of August, as published in O'Sullevan Beare's work.

== Sources ==
- Butler, Alban (1799), The Lives of the Primitive Fathers, Martyrs, and Other Principal Saints, J. Moir This article incorporates text from this source, which is in the public domain.
- Derks, T. (October 2002), "De tempels van Elst", Archeologisch Instituut Vrije Universiteit, Amsterdam, Brochure (9)
- Heitink, G. (2007), Een kerk met karakter: tijd voor heroriëntatie, Uitgeverij Kok, ISBN 978-9043514064
- Koutrafouri, Vasiliki G.; Sanders, Jeff (31 December 2013), Ritual Failure: Archaeological Perspectives, Sidestone Press, ISBN 978-90-8890-220-8
- O'Hanlon, John (1873), Lives of the Irish saints, vol. 8 This article incorporates text from this source, which is in the public domain.
- "Saint Werenfridus", CatholicSaints.info, 21 August 2013
- St. Augustine's Abbey, Ramsgate (1921). The Book of saints : a dictionary of servants of God canonized by the Catholic Church. London: A. & C. Black, ltd. OCLC 671676136. This article incorporates text from this source, which is in the public domain.
