= 1934–35 Kansas Jayhawks men's basketball team =

American college basketball season

1934–35 Kansas Jayhawks men's basketball
- Conference: Big Six Conference
- Record: 15–5 (12–4 Big 6)
- Head coach: Phog Allen (18th season)
- Captain: Dick Wells
- Home arena: Hoch Auditorium

1934–35 Big Six Conference men's basketball standings
| | Conf. | | | | Overall |
| Team | W | | L | PCT | W | | L | PCT |
|---|---|---|---|---|---|---|---|---|
| Iowa State | 8 | – | 2 | .800 | 13 | – | 3 | .813 |
| Kansas | 12 | – | 4 | .750 | 15 | – | 5 | .750 |
| Oklahoma | 8 | – | 8 | .500 | 9 | – | 9 | .500 |
| Missouri | 7 | – | 9 | .438 | 7 | – | 11 | .389 |
| Nebraska | 3 | – | 7 | .300 | 6 | – | 12 | .333 |
| Kansas State | 4 | – | 12 | .250 | 5 | – | 15 | .250 |

The 1934–35 Kansas Jayhawks men's basketball team represented the University of Kansas during the 1934–35 college men's basketball season.

== Roster ==
- Gordon Gray
- Ray Ebling
- Lester Kappelman
- Raymond Noble
- Wilmer Shaffer
- Al Wellhausen
- Paul Rogers
- Dick Wells
- Milton Allen
- Robert Oyler

== Schedule ==
| Date time, TV | Rank^{#} | Opponent^{#} | Result | Record | Site city, state |
|---|---|---|---|---|---|
| December 14 | | Kansas State; Sunflower Showdown | L 35–39 | 0-1 | Hoch Auditorium; Lawrence, KS |
| December 18 | | at Kansas State; Sunflower Showdown | W 40–26 | 1-1 | Nichols Hall; Manhattan, KS |
| December 29* | | Emporia State | W 32–30 | 2-1 | Hoch Auditorium; Lawrence, KS |
| January 7 | | Missouri; Border War | W 39–29 | 3-1 (1-0) | Hoch Auditorium; Lawrence, KS |
| January 8 | | Missouri; Border War | W 36–27 | 4-1 (2-0) | Hoch Auditorium; Lawrence, KS |
| January 11 | | Kansas State; Sunflower Showdown | W 40–14 | 5-1 (3-0) | Hoch Auditorium; Lawrence, KS |
| January 15 | | Oklahoma | W 50–23 | 6-1 (4-0) | Hoch Auditorium; Lawrence, KS |
| January 16 | | Oklahoma | L 26–36 | 6-2 (4-1) | Hoch Auditorium; Lawrence, KS |
| January 26 | | Kansas State; Sunflower Showdown | W 43–37 | 7-2 (5-1) | Hoch Auditorium; Lawrence, KS |
| February 5* | | at Washburn | W 33–27 | 8-2 | Topeka, KS |
| February 9 | | Iowa State | W 35–18 | 9-2 (6-1) | Hoch Auditorium; Lawrence, KS |
| February 11 | | Nebraska | W 32–21 | 10-2 (7-1) | Hoch Auditorium; Lawrence, KS |
| February 15 | | at Nebraska | W 32–24 | 11-2 (8-1) | Nebraska Coliseum; Lincoln, NE |
| February 18 | | at Iowa State | L 20–32 | 11-3 (8-2) | State Gymnasium; Ames, IA |
| February 22 | | at Kansas State; Sunflower Showdown | W 39–33 | 12-3 (9-2) | Nichols Hall; Manhattan, KS |
| February 23 | | at Kansas State; Sunflower Showdown | W 36–30 | 13-3 (10-2) | Nichols Hall; Manhattan, KS |
| March 1 | | at Missouri; Border War | L 21–23 | 13-4 (10-3) | Brewer Fieldhouse; Columbia, MO |
| March 2 | | at Missouri; Border War | L 18–21 | 13-5 (10-4) | Brewer Fieldhouse; Columbia, MO |
| March 6 | | at Oklahoma | W 40–31 | 14-5 (11-4) | Field House; Norman, OK |
| March 7 | | at Oklahoma | W 47–42 | 15-5 (12-4) | Field House; Norman, OK |
*Non-conference game. ^{#}Rankings from AP Poll. (#) Tournament seedings in parentheses.
