= 1934–35 Wisconsin Badgers men's basketball team =

American college basketball season

1934–35 Wisconsin Badgers men's basketball

Big Ten Conference Co–Champions
- Conference: Big Ten Conference
- Record: 15–5 (9–3 Big Ten)
- Head coach: Harold E. Foster
- Home arena: UW Fieldhouse

1934–35 Big Ten Conference men's basketball standings
	Conf.				Overall
Team	W		L	PCT	W		L	PCT
Purdue	9	–	3	.750	17	–	3	.850
Illinois	9	–	3	.750	15	–	5	.750
Wisconsin	9	–	3	.750	15	–	5	.750
Indiana	8	–	4	.667	14	–	6	.700
Ohio State	8	–	4	.667	13	–	6	.684
Iowa	6	–	6	.500	10	–	9	.526
Minnesota	5	–	7	.417	11	–	9	.550
Northwestern	3	–	9	.250	10	–	10	.500
Michigan	2	–	10	.167	8	–	12	.400
Chicago	1	–	11	.083	2	–	18	.100

The 1934–35 Wisconsin Badgers men's basketball team represented University of Wisconsin–Madison. The head coach was Harold E. Foster, coaching his first season with the Badgers. The team played their home games at the UW Fieldhouse in Madison, Wisconsin and was a member of the Big Ten Conference.

== Schedule ==
Date time, TV	Rank^{#}	Opponent^{#}	Result	Record	Site city, state
Regular Season
11/30/1934*		Franklin (IN)	W 34–11	1–0	UW Fieldhouse; Madison, WI
12/07/1934*		Carleton (MN)	W 27–26	2–0	UW Fieldhouse; Madison, WI
12/10/1934*		Wabash (IN)	W 33–20	3–0	UW Fieldhouse; Madison, WI
12/15/1934*		Marquette	W 29–20	4–0	UW Fieldhouse; Madison, WI
12/22/1934*		at Marquette	L 25–33	4–1	Marquette Gymnasium; Milwaukee, WI
12/29/1934*		Pittsburgh	L 27–31	4–2	UW Fieldhouse; Madison, WI
12/31/1934*		Michigan State	W 23–21 ^{OT}	5–2	UW Fieldhouse; Madison, WI
1/05/1935		Purdue	L 18–19	5–3 (0–1)	UW Fieldhouse; Madison, WI
1/07/1935		Northwestern	W 16–9	6–3 (1–1)	UW Fieldhouse; Madison, WI
1/12/1935		at Indiana	W 30–23	7–3 (2–1)	IU Fieldhouse; Bloomington, IN
1/14/1935		Michigan	W 34–20	8–3 (3–1)	UW Fieldhouse; Madison, WI
1/19/1935		at Northwestern	L 31–36	8–4 (3–2)	Patten Gymnasium; Evanston, IL
1/21/1935		Minnesota	W 38–31	9–4 (4–2)	UW Fieldhouse; Madison, WI
2/09/1935*		DePauw (IN)	W 28–27	10–4	UW Fieldhouse; Madison, WI
2/11/1935		Chicago	W 26–24	11–4 (5–2)	UW Fieldhouse; Madison, WI
2/16/1935		Indiana	W 37–27 ^{OT}	12–4 (6–2)	UW Fieldhouse; Madison, WI
2/18/1935		at Minnesota	W 28–27	13–4 (7–2)	Williams Field House; Minneapolis, MN
2/23/1935		at Michigan	W 33–19	14–4 (8–2)	Yost Fieldhouse; Ann Arbor, MI
3/02/1935		at Chicago	W 48–25	15–4 (9–2)	Henry Crown Field House; Chicago, IL
3/04/1935		at Purdue	L 24–43	15–5 (9–3)	Lafayette Jefferson HS Gymnasium; Lafayette, IN
*Non-conference game. ^{#}Rankings from AP Poll. (#) Tournament seedings in parentheses.
