= Strandpulling =

Type of physical exercise

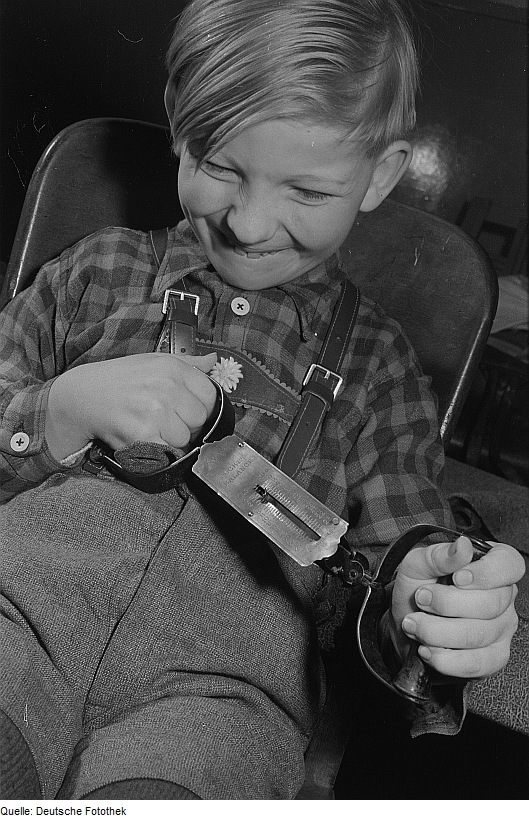
A child using a makeshift chest expander

Strandpulling is the general term for the practice of stretching steel springs, rubber cables or latex tubing, as a form of exercise and as a competitive sport, using a "chest expander", with many specific movements designed to target different muscles and provide progressive resistance usually, but not always, to the upper body.

== History ==
In 1857, the Dublin Quarterly Journal of Medical Science claimed the modern chest expander was invented and patented by Henry Cost, but does not provide the year it was invented.

The chest expander has been used for medical rehabilitation since at least 1851, and they have been used in some formal physical education programs since at least the 1880s. By the end of the 1800s, they were a common household exercise device, found in many affluent homes in parts of Europe. Strandpulling reached its height of popularity in the early 1900s, although they are still very commonly used as home-based exercise equipment.

== Design ==
The chest expander comprises a pair of handles joined by a variable number of springs or rubber cables. While still popular with some enthusiasts, steel springs have largely been superseded by rubber cables or tubing, although steel spring sets are still manufactured and sold around the world on a limited basis. The first rubberized versions appeared in 1857.

Modern developments of strandpulling include longer cables which provide a greater variety of whole-body movements, being largely cable-stretching substitutes for weight-training exercises. Many weight-trainers use cables for assistance movements in order to overcome sticking points, and/or speed enhancement.

The user holds a handle in each hand and pulls the handles apart against the resistance of the springs or cables. To increase the resistance as the muscles are developed, the user can simply add additional springs or cables.

== Uses ==
Strandpulling with a chest expander can be done for a variety of fitness purposes, not just building chest muscles. There are several classic strandpulling movements, such as the front chest pull and lateral raise, and many more totalling well over 30 movements for the upper body alone. Several of these classic strandpulling exercises have been used for competition, more so in the UK than elsewhere, and as a sport, it has enjoyed considerable popularity from time to time, with some competitors able to perform movements with enormous pullweights.

Strandpulling can provide stand-alone progressive strength and endurance training, and be used as an addition to weight-training and other forms of exercise. Strandpulling is also used for rehabilitation and is generally easier on the joints (elbows, shoulders etc.) than other forms of resistance training.

== See also ==
- Bullworker
- Elasticity (physics), the source of resistance in cable training.
- Hooke's law
