= Elst, Gelderland =

Elst
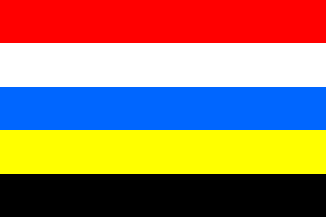
- Flag Coat of arms
- Interactive map of Elst
- Coordinates: 51°54′56″N 5°50′16″E
- Country: Netherlands
- Province: Gelderland
- Municipality: Overbetuwe

Population (2022)
  - Total: 22,509

Elst (Dutch pronunciation: [ɛlst]) is a town in the municipality of Overbetuwe in the Dutch province of Gelderland. It is situated in the Betuwe, between the cities of Arnhem and Nijmegen. In January 2022 the town had 22,509 inhabitants.

Elst is known for its Roman temples, which are situated under St Martin's (or the St Werenfried) church. Elst was a separate municipality until 2001, when it became a part of Overbetuwe.

Elstar is an apple cultivar that was developed in Elst in the 1950s.

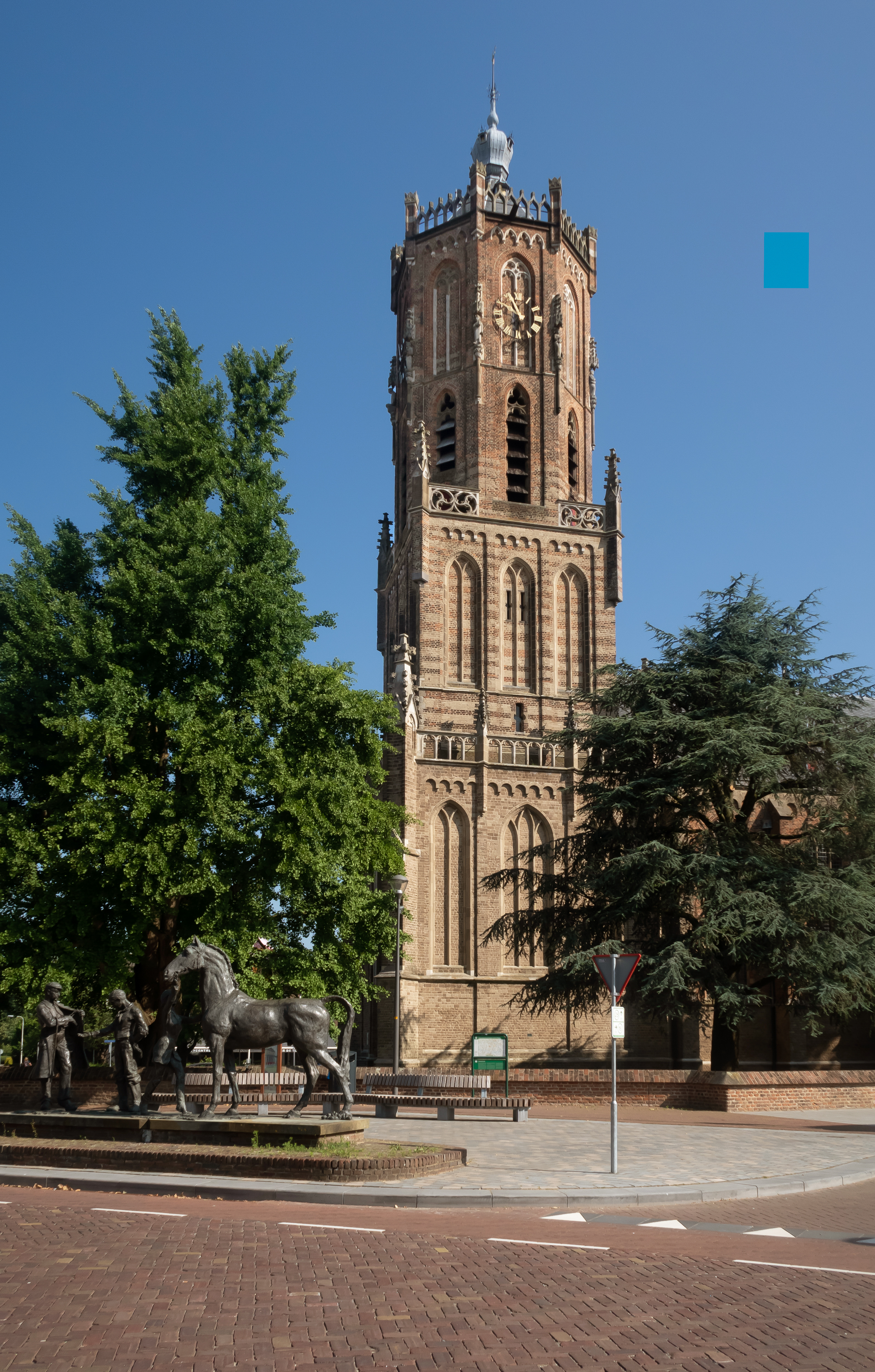
Saint-Martin Church in Elst

== History ==
A number of archeological finds have been made in Elst. In 1947, while repairing war damage, the remains of two Roman temples were discovered under St Martin's Church, including one of the largest found north of the Alps. Further Roman buildings have since been found in the town, as have prehistoric items.

The missionary Saint Werenfried of Elst, was buried in Elst in circa 780. In the middle ages his tomb attracted pilgrims, as his intercession was believed to cure disorders, especially those related to arthritis.

In September 1944, Elst was the scene of fighting between Allied and German troops during Operation Market Garden. During this, the tower of St Martin's Church was used as an observation post, and was largely destroyed by shelling. The church was rebuilt after the war.

The municipality of Elst has existed since 1812. In January 2001 it became a part of the new municipality of Overbetuwe, when it merged with the municipalities of Heteren and Valburg. Since then, Elst has expanded with the building of new housing and industrial estates.

H. J. Heinz Company's sauce factory for the European market is located in Elst. In 2006 Heinz moved production of HP Sauce here from Birmingham, England. Seen as a traditional British sauce, the decision received adverse publicity in the UK at the time.

== Education ==
Elst is home to three high schools: Het Westeraam, Lyceum and Over Betuwe College Elst (OBC Elst).

== Sports ==
There are several sports clubs in Elst, including:

- Spero (Football)
- BCE (badminton)
- Elistha (Football)
- ETV (tennis)
- EZ & PC (swimming)
- Gaviiformes (scuba diving)
- Gemini (Volleyball)
- HCOB (field hockey)
- Unlimited (basketball)
- Budo vereniging (martial arts)

== The Linge near Elst ==
The river Linge flows just north of Elst.

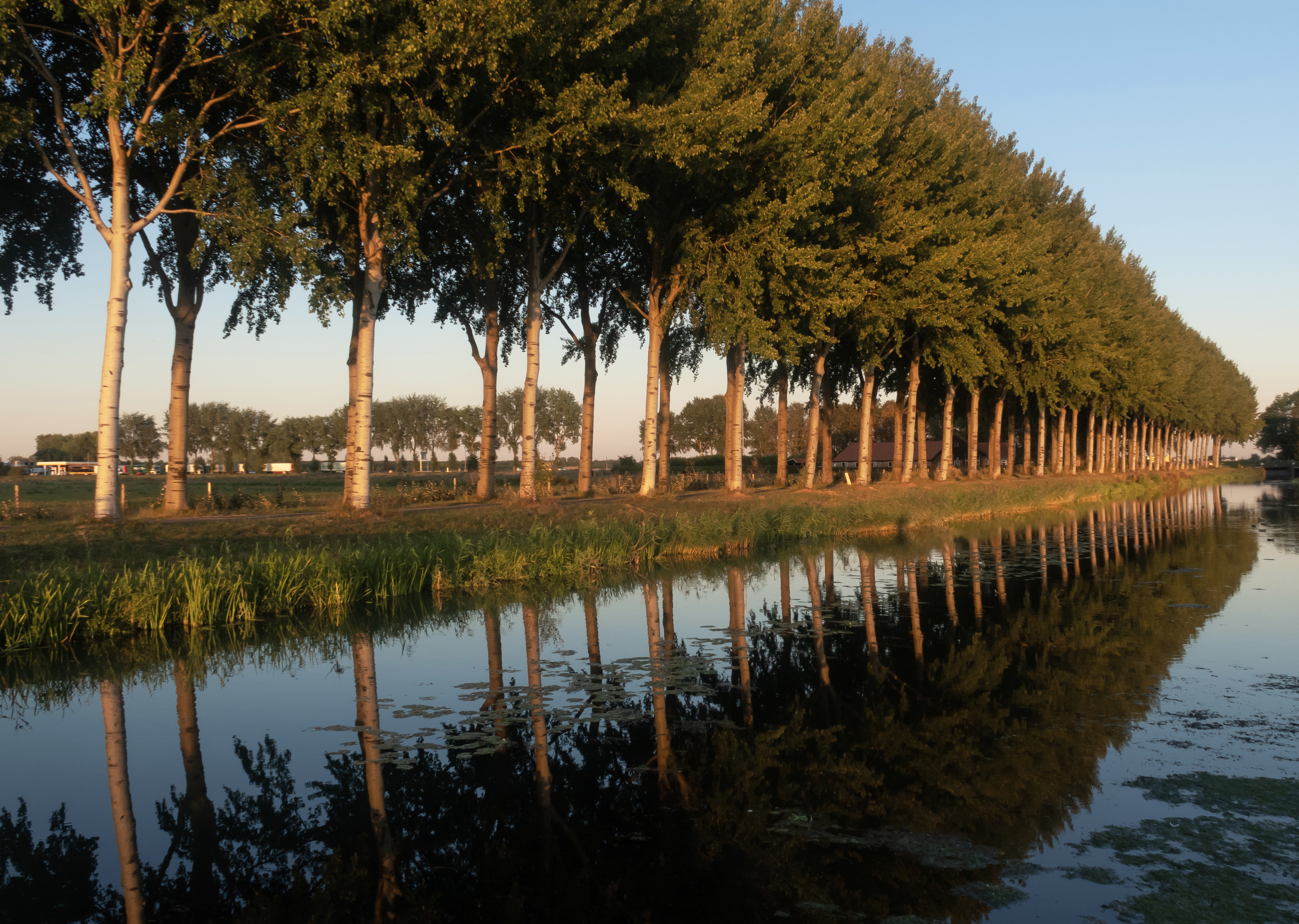
The Linge from the Welsh Guardsbrug

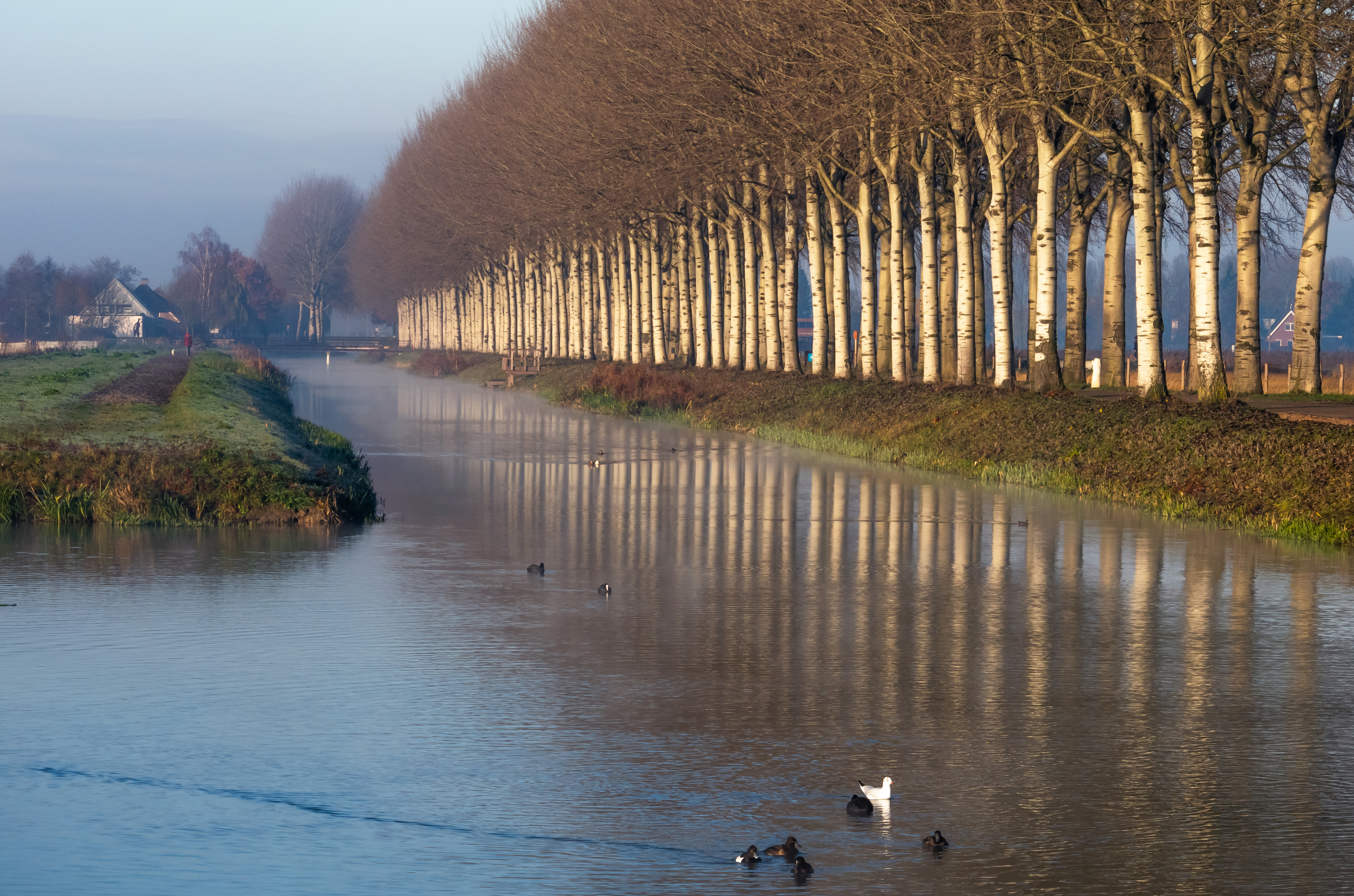
The Linge in the autumn

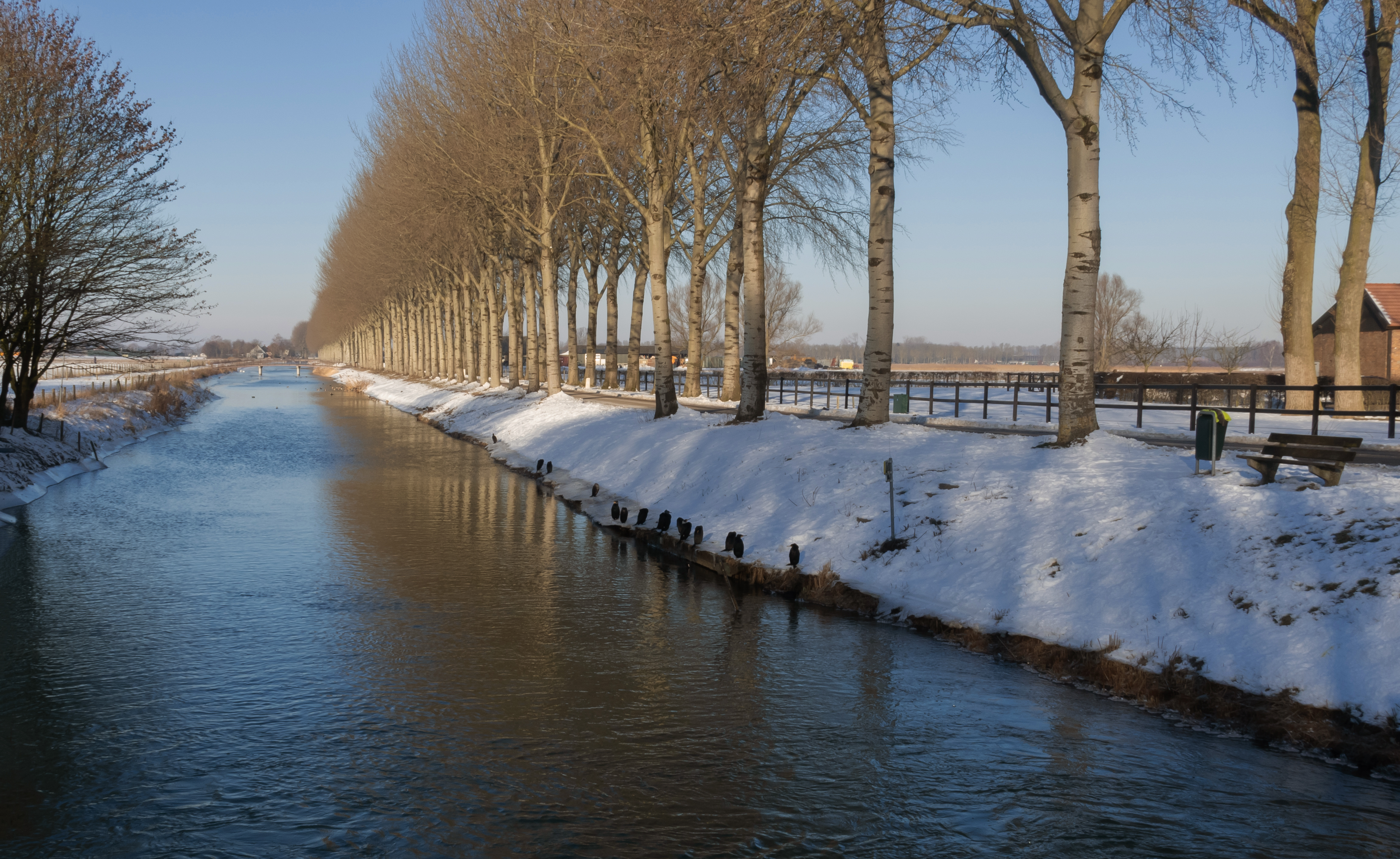
The Linge in the winter

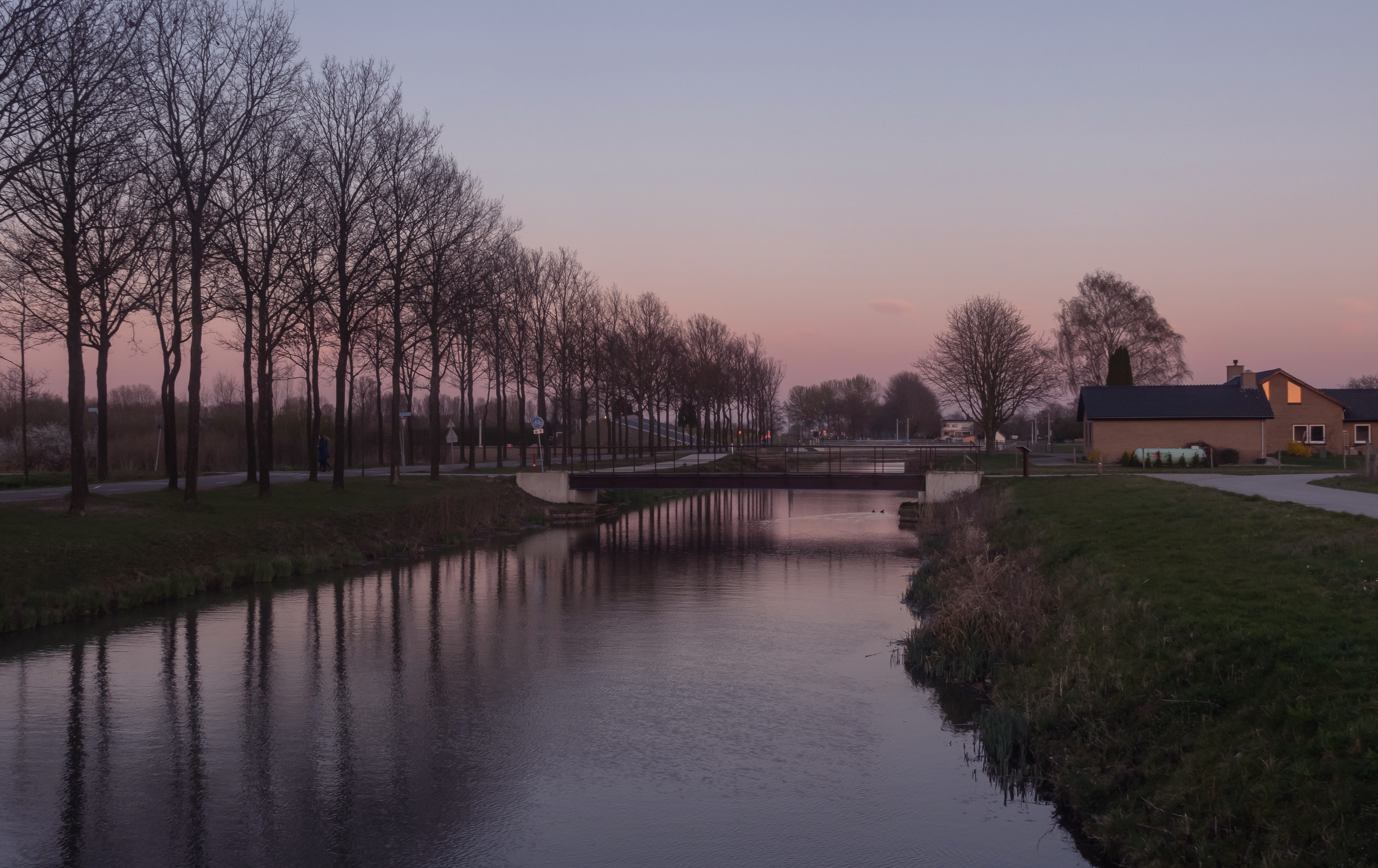
The Linge near the viaduct across the railway

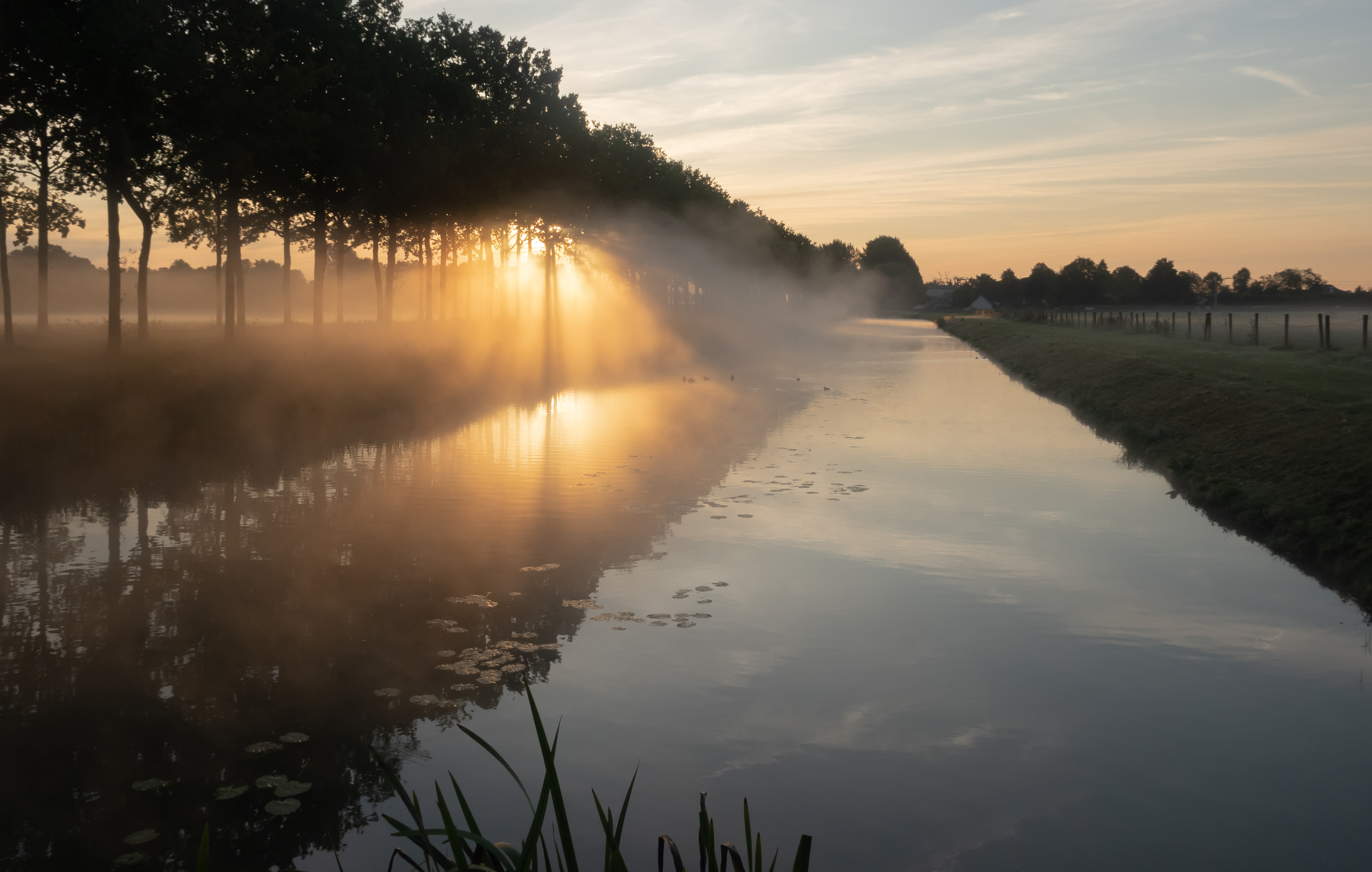
The Linge near the first Weteringswal

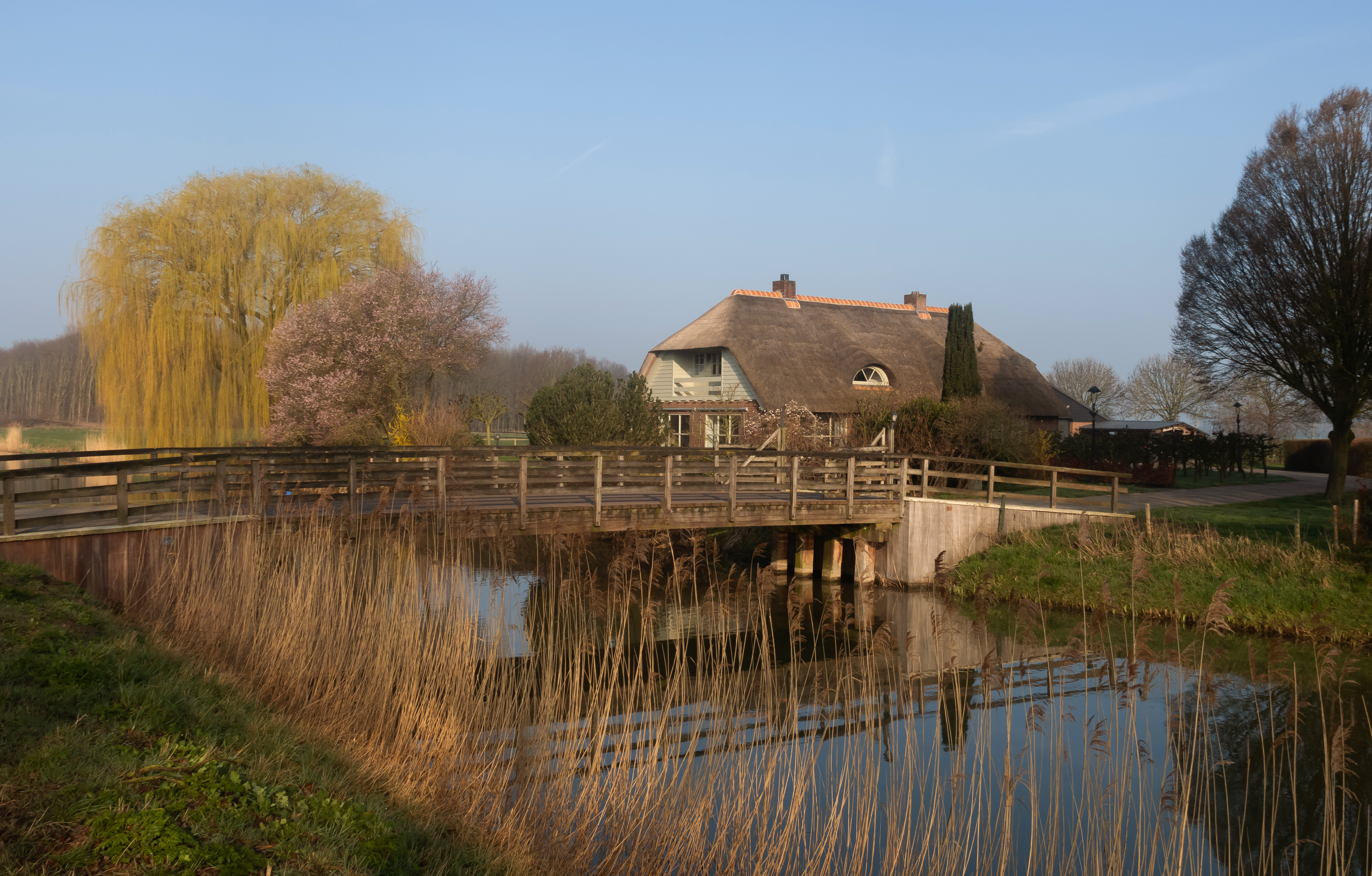
The Linge at the second Weteringswal

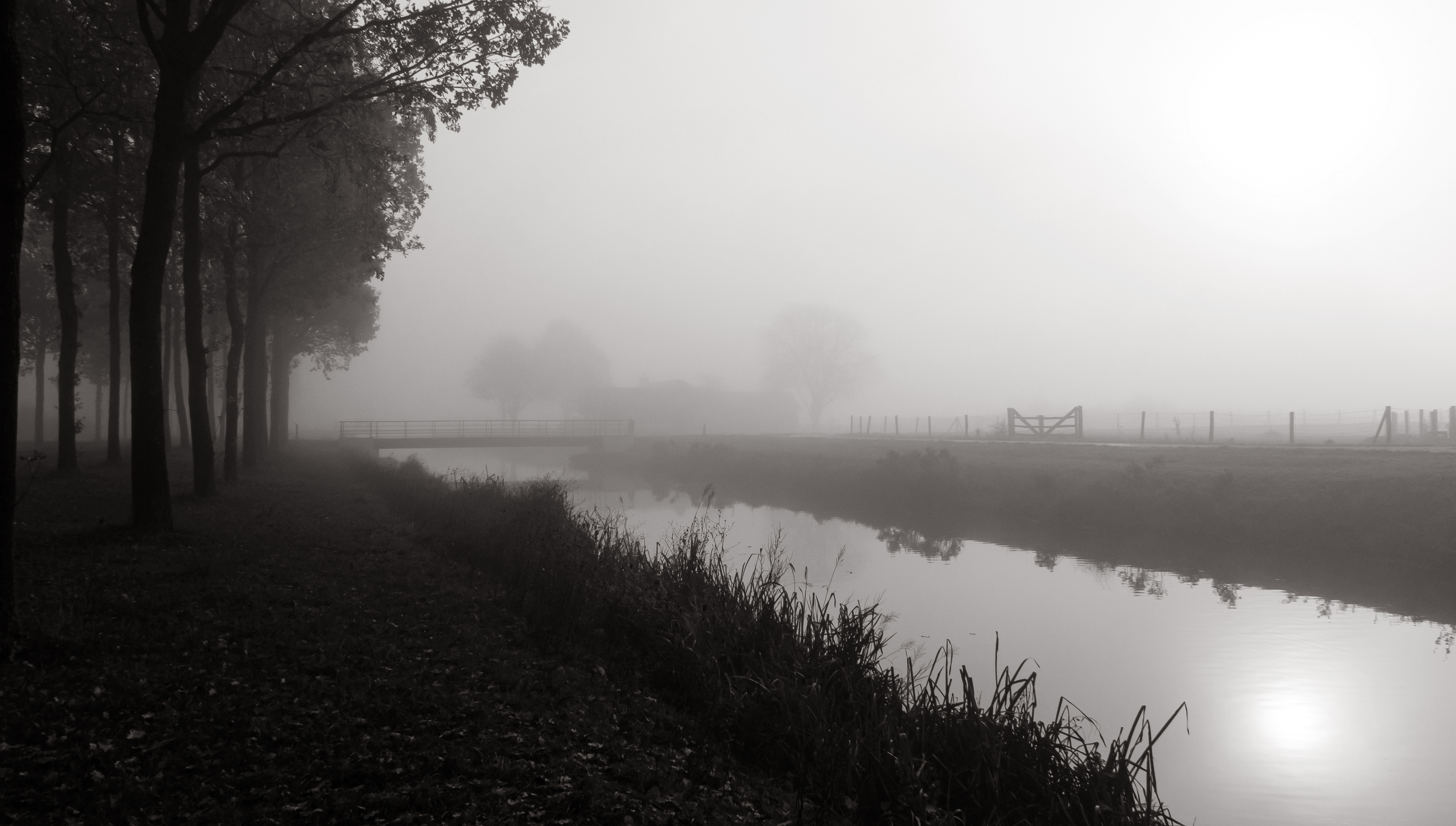
The Linge in the fog near Romeins Lint Oost

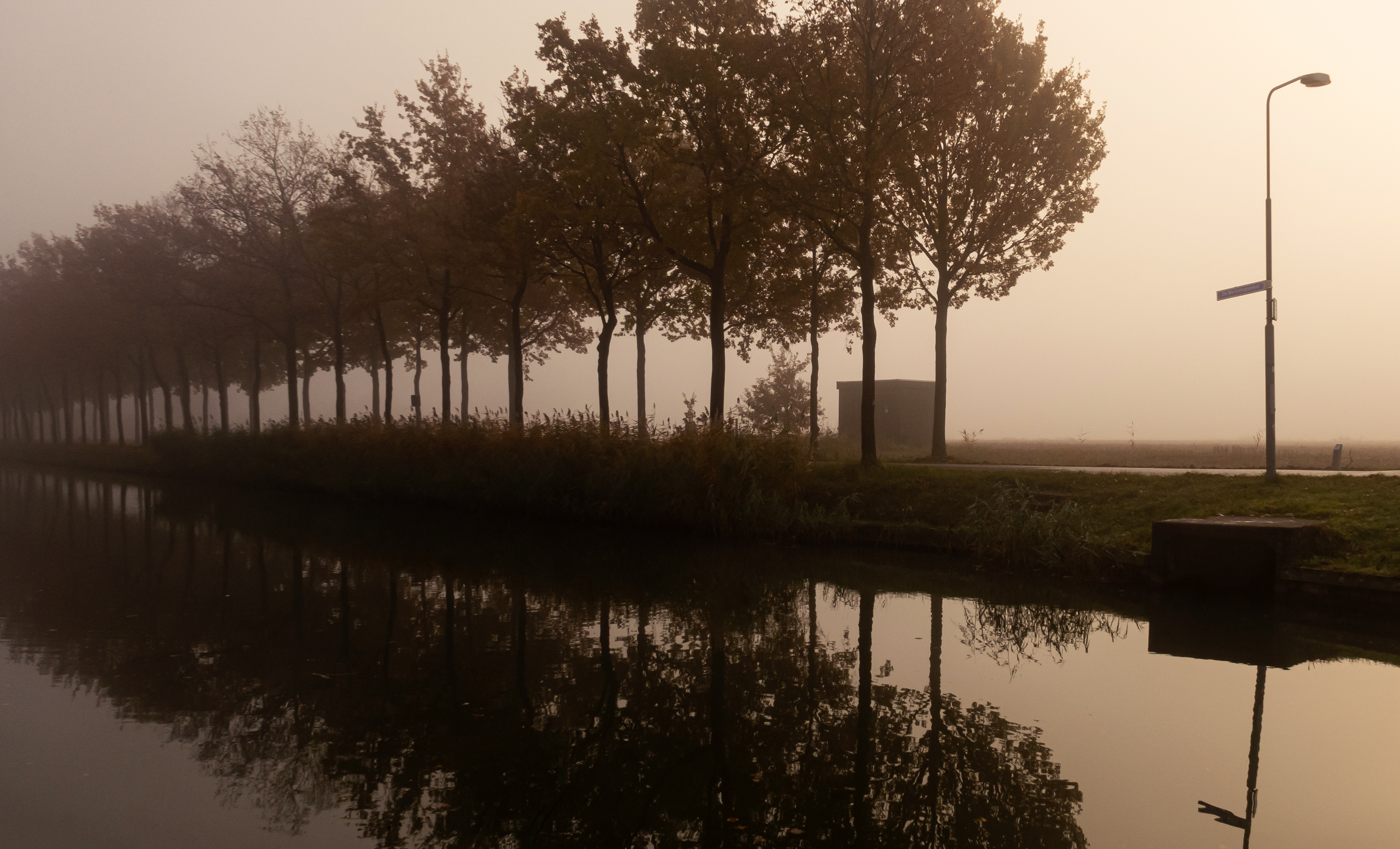
The Linge from the bridge (the Raaijebrug)

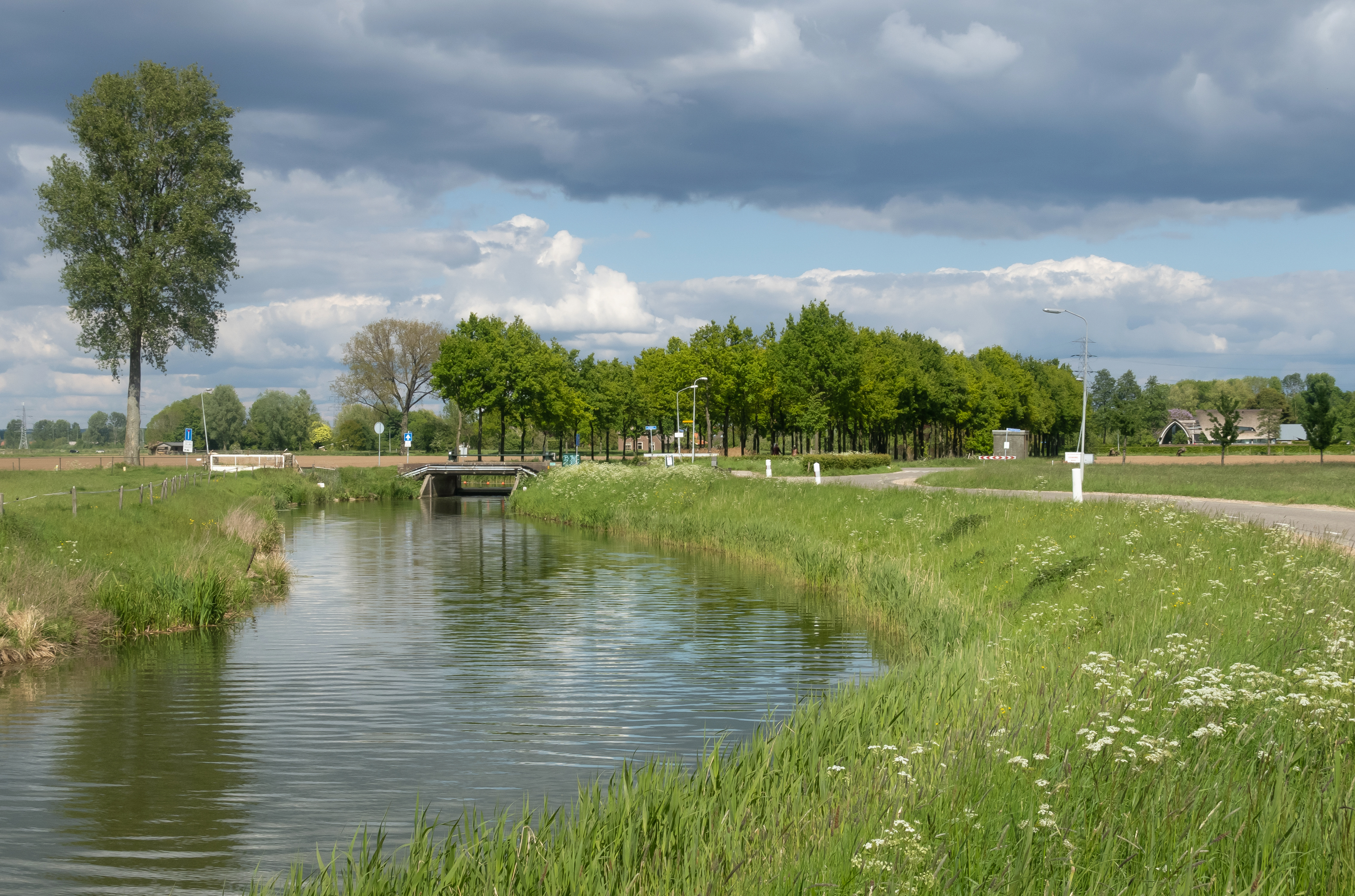
The Linge near the bridge (the Raaijebrug)

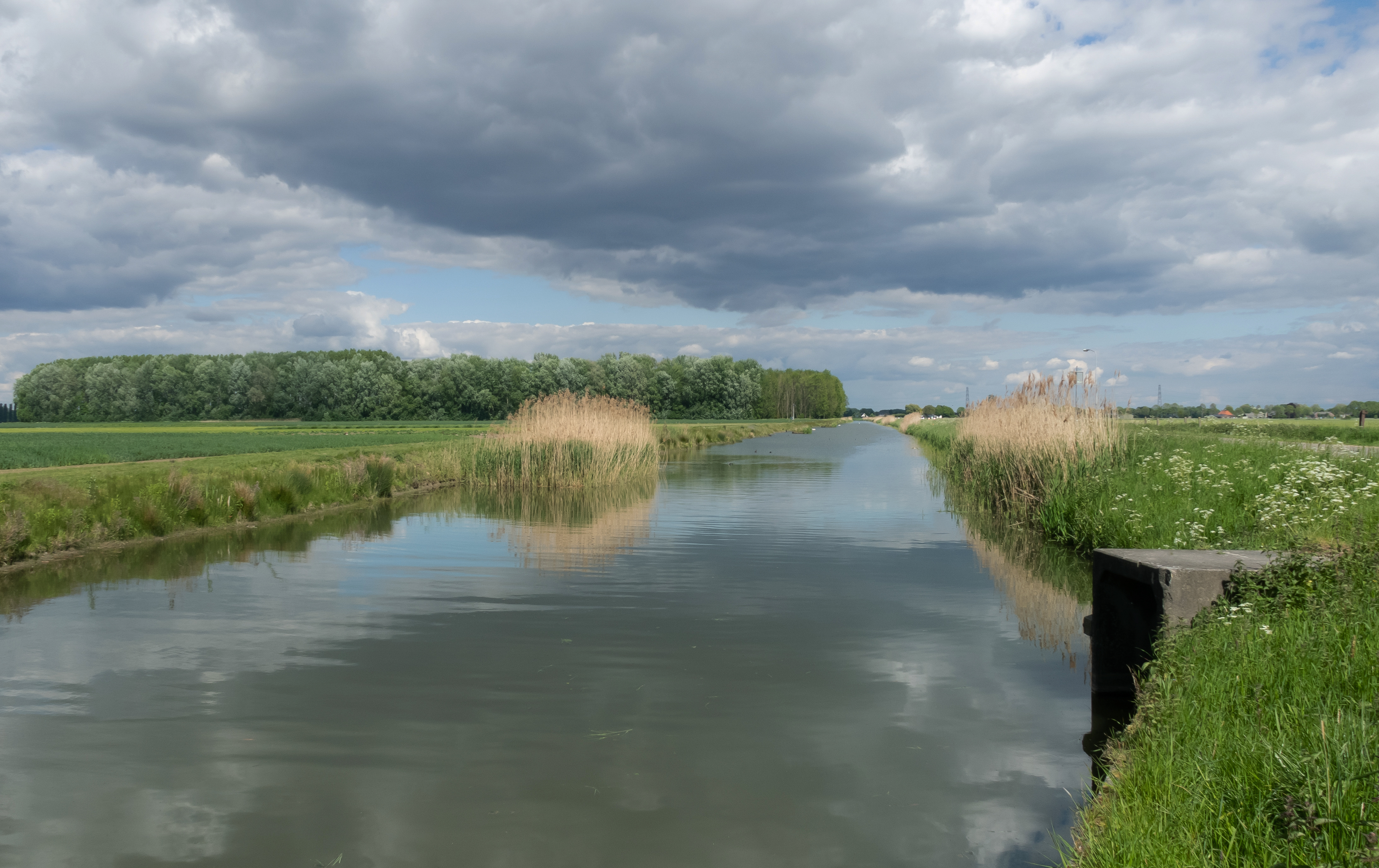
The Linge from the bridge (the Langstraatbrug)

== People born in Elst ==
- Pierre Kartner (1935–2022), singer and composer
- Frits Kuipers (1899–1943), footballer
- Paul Kuypers (1939–1971), agricultural scientist
- Henk "Henkie" Leeuwis (1945–2022), singer
- Jeffrey Leiwakabessy (born 1981), footballer
- Dirk Proper (born 2002), footballer
- Hans Weijs (born 1986), rally driver
- Peter J. Williamson (1823–1907), architect, American Civil War adjutant to General William T. Sherman
- Jan Zwartkruis (1925–2013), footballer

== Transportation ==
- Elst railway station
