= Peter J. Williamson =

Dutch-American architect

- Born: April 20, 1823; Elst, Netherlands
- Died: February 15, 1907 (aged 83); Nashville, Tennessee, U.S.
- Occupation: Architect

Peter J. Williamson (April 20, 1823, Elst, Netherlands - February 15, 1907, Nashville, Tennessee) was a Dutch-American architect.

== Biography ==
He emigrated to Green Bay, Wisconsin in 1849 at the age of 26. He was trained at a post-secondary educational institution in the Netherlands in an era prior to the true profession of "architect." He thought of himself as a professional architect from an early date, and he is listed as one in the 1860 U.S. Census. In 1854, he bought 40 acres in the township of Segole, Wisconsin, which is now Freedom, Wisconsin, near the Oneida Reservation in the Fox River Valley. He built a farmhouse there, and was joined by his family members from Elst.

Prior to the Civil War, in Appleton, Wisconsin, he is thought to have helped with the remodeling design of Old Main Hall of Lawrence University, designed a local school and the County Jail in Appleton described as "an excellent piece of workmanship", and one of the early bridges over the ravine on College Avenue, Appleton, Wisconsin.

When the Civil War broke out, Williamson enlisted in the Wisconsin First Cavalry in 1862. He was stationed first in Missouri, then fought in Tennessee, including at Missionary Ridge. He fought with Sherman's Army, and he reported for the Appleton Post Crescent on his exploits in McCook's Raid outside of Atlanta.

His letters were donated to the Nashville Public Library. Currently, they are held within Vanderbilt Libraries Special Collections. Many of them were published in the Wisconsin Magazine of History., through the help of a Vanderbilt professor. He joined the First Regiment of the Wisconsin Cavalry as a Private at the age of 38. In January he was mustered in as a Sgt. Major. He was promoted to First Lieutenant and made Company Commander.

== Works ==
Most of his buildings were completed after the Civil War when he settled with his family in Nashville. These include the following: McClung House in Knoxville, TN; "Old Gymnasium" on Vanderbilt University Campus, Nashville, TN; Wesley Hall, Vanderbilt Campus, built in 1880 (destroyed by fire in 1932); Church House, Columbia TN built in 1873; First Presbyterian Church, McMinnville, TN; W.K. Dobson and P.J. Williamson, Architects; City Block Hotel in Nashville, designed by Peter J. Williamson, torn down in 1972 in an urban renewal program; Benson Hall, Vanderbilt University, Nashville, TN; Ryman Auditorium, Designed by Hugh Thompson, a draftsman and designer for Peter J. Williamson prior to the design work on the Grand Ole Opry. (Williamson was not directly involved in the design of the Ryman);Cowan, McClung and Company Building (also known as Fidelity Building) in Knoxville, TN Architects: Baumann & Baumann, and Baumann and P. J. Williamson;Mount Olivet Cemetery, Nashville (also in National Register of Historic Places, P. J. Williamson is listed as one of the designers of the cemetery.

Peter J. Williamson's works were described by architectural historian James Patrick, as being part of a post Civil War "architectural transformation," that moved away from some of the more classical styles (Gothic, Greek Revival and Romanesque styles) to styles that "displayed man not as the creature of some reasonable and regular order but as master of space, matter and the historical past, capable of effecting whatever might please" Such styles embraced by Williamson and others include Second Empire ("a style developed in France after 1854 when the Nouveau Louvre was begun by J. T. Visconti and Hector Martin Lefuel; the Paris Expositions of 1855 and 1867 spread the style". The Second Empire style is characterized by mansard roofs, "richly enframed dormers", roofs crowned by heavy ornate, and non-traditional pediments, as well as extensive use of iron railings and balustrades". It was a new fashion of architecture in which traditional elements such as arches, brackets, pediments were given a "free, often exotic" treatment. The picture of the McClung mansion in Knoxville, designed by Peter J. Williamson, exemplifies the Second Empire style.

== Work on the National Register of Historic Places ==
- Gymnasium, Vanderbilt University
- Mount Olivet Cemetery
- First Presbyterian Church
- Grace Episcopal Church
- St. Luke's Episcopal Church
- Cowan, McClung and Company Building. Also known as Fidelity Building
- Vanderbilt University Wesley Hall
- City Block Hotel, Nashville
- Church House, Columbia, TN
- Grace Episcopal Church, Spring Hill TN
