= 1934–35 La Salle Explorers men's basketball team =

American college basketball season

1934–35 La Salle Explorers men's basketball
- Conference: Independent
- Record: 15–6
- Head coach: Leonard Tanseer (2nd season)
- Captain: Matt Kratchowill
- Home arena: Wister Hall

The 1934–35 La Salle Explorers men's basketball team represented La Salle University during the 1934–35 NCAA men's basketball season. The head coach was Leonard Tanseer, coaching the explorers in his second season. The team finished with an overall record of 15–6.

== Schedule ==
Date time, TV	Opponent	Result	Record	Site city, state
Dec 6, 1934*	Phila. Pharmacy	W 62–33	1–0	Wister Hall; Philadelphia, PA
Dec 11, 1934*	at Penn A.C.	L 34–38 ^{2ot}	1–1	Philadelphia, PA
Dec 14, 1934*	Catholic	W 29–24	2–1	Wister Hall; Philadelphia, PA
Dec. 18, 1934*	Upsala	W 51–22	3–1	Wister Hall; Philadelphia, PA
Dec. 20, 1934*	Mount St. Mary's	W 27–14	4–1	Wister Hall; Philadelphia, PA
Jan. 8, 1935	Penn A.C.	W 44–23	5–1	Wister Hall; Philadelphia, PA
Jan 11, 1935	Scranton	W 39–33	6–1	Wister Hall; Philadelphia, PA
Jan. 15, 1935	at Seton Hall	W 30–21	7–1	South Orange, NJ
Jan. 19, 1935*	Saint Joseph	L 23–25	7–2	Wister Hall; Philadelphia, PA
Jan. 22, 1935*	at Catholic	L 21–30	7–3	Washington, D.C.
Jan. 26, 1935*	Seton Hall	W 35–19	8–3	Wister Hall; Philadelphia, PA
Jan. 28, 1935*	Davis-Elkins	W 34–24	9–3	Wister Hall; Philadelphia, PA
Feb. 1, 1935*	Brooklyn College	W 28–17	10–3	Wister Hall; Philadelphia, PA
Feb. 11, 1935*	at Villanova	L 21–22	10–4	Jake Nevin Field House; Villanova, PA
Feb. 13, 1935*	at Saint Joseph's	W 32–25	11–4	Philadelphia, PA
Feb. 16, 1935*	at Phila. Pharmacy	W 52–35	12–4	Philadelphia, PA
Feb. 20, 1935*	at Pennsylvania	L 22–33	12–5	The Palestra; Philadelphia, PA
Feb. 22, 1935*	Saint Joseph's	L 25–26	12–6	Wister Hall; Philadelphia, PA
Feb. 27, 1935*	Rider	W 44–35	13–6	Wister Hall; Philadelphia, PA
Mar. 1, 1935*	Baltimore	W 30–25	14–6	Wister Hall; Philadelphia, PA
Mar. 9, 1935*	Villanova	W 29–23	15–6	Wister Hall; Philadelphia, PA
*Non-conference game. (#) Tournament seedings in parentheses.
