= 1934–35 William & Mary Indians men's basketball team =

American college basketball season

1934–35 William & Mary Indians men's basketball
- Conference: Independent
- Record: 10–5
- Head coach: Tom Dowler (1st season)
- Home arena: Blow Gymnasium

The 1934–35 William & Mary Indians men's basketball team represented the College of William & Mary in intercollegiate basketball during the 1934–35 season. Under the first year of head coach Tom Dowler, the team finished the season with a 10–5 record. This was the 30th season of the collegiate basketball program at William & Mary, whose nickname is now the Tribe. William & Mary played the season as an independent.

== Schedule ==
Date time, TV	Rank^{#}	Opponent^{#}	Result	Record	Site city, state
Regular season
*		at Virginia	L 21–25	0–1	Memorial Gymnasium; Charlottesville, VA
*		Newport News Apprentice School	W 35–11	1–1	Blow Gymnasium; Williamsburg, VA
*		Medical College of Virginia	W 33–20	2–1	Blow Gymnasium; Williamsburg, VA
*		at VPI	L 24–30	2–2	War Memorial Gymnasium; Blacksburg, VA
*		at Roanoke College	W 43–36	3–2	Roanoke, VA
*		at Washington and Lee	W 38–36	4–2	Lexington, VA
*		at VMI	W 27–23	5–2	Lexington, VA
2/8/1935*		Richmond	L 20–46	5–3	Blow Gymnasium; Williamsburg, VA
*		vs. Virginia	W 45–31	6–3	Newport News, VA
*		Roanoke College	W 41–37	7–3	Blow Gymnasium; Williamsburg, VA
*		VPI	W 42–26	8–3	Blow Gymnasium; Williamsburg, VA
*		at Newport News Apprentice School	W 34–31	9–3	Newport News, VA
*		VMI	W 43–36	10–3	Blow Gymnasium; Williamsburg, VA
2/26/1935*		Richmond	L 39–58	10–4	Blow Gymnasium; Williamsburg, VA
3/9/1935*		Navy	L 28–46	10–5	Blow Gymnasium; Williamsburg, VA
*Non-conference game. ^{#}Rankings from AP Poll. (#) Tournament seedings in parentheses.
