= 1934–35 Michigan Wolverines men's basketball team =

American college basketball season

1934–35 Michigan Wolverines men's basketball
- Conference: Big Ten Conference
- Record: 8–12 (2–10 Big Ten)
- Head coach: Franklin Cappon
- Captain: Alfred Plummer
- Home arena: Yost Field House

1934–35 Big Ten Conference men's basketball standings
	Conf.				Overall
Team	W		L	PCT	W		L	PCT
Purdue	9	–	3	.750	17	–	3	.850
Illinois	9	–	3	.750	15	–	5	.750
Wisconsin	9	–	3	.750	15	–	5	.750
Indiana	8	–	4	.667	14	–	6	.700
Ohio State	8	–	4	.667	13	–	6	.684
Iowa	6	–	6	.500	10	–	9	.526
Minnesota	5	–	7	.417	11	–	9	.550
Northwestern	3	–	9	.250	10	–	10	.500
Michigan	2	–	10	.167	8	–	12	.400
Chicago	1	–	11	.083	2	–	18	.100

The 1934–35 Michigan Wolverines men's basketball team represented the University of Michigan in intercollegiate basketball during the 1934–35 season. The team compiled an 8–12 record and 2–10 against Big Ten Conference opponents.

Franklin Cappon was in his fourth year as the team's head coach. Alfred Plummer was the team captain, and Richard Joslin was the team's leading scorer with 71 points in 18 games for an average of 3.9 points per game.

The team's second leading scorer, Johnny Gee, went on to play as a pitcher in Major League Baseball from 1939 to 1946. Chelso Tamagno went on to play two seasons with the Akron Goodyear Wingfoots in the National Basketball League. Matt Patanelli was selected as the Most Valuable Player on the 1936 Michigan Wolverines football team.

== Scoring statistics ==
Player	Games	Field goals	Free throws	Points	Points per game
Richard Joslin	18	27	17	71	3.9
Johnny Gee	17	29	8	64	3.8
Alfred Plummer	14	28	5	61	4.5
Earl Meyers	15	24	12	60	4.0
George Rudness	14	15	18	48	3.4
Chelso Tamagno	17	19	11	49	2.9
Matt Patanelli	17	18	11	47	2.8
Totals	20	197	108	502	25.1
