= 1934–35 Illinois Fighting Illini men's basketball team =

American college basketball season

1934–35 Illinois Fighting Illini men's basketball

Big Ten Conference champion
- Conference: Big Ten Conference
- Record: 15–5 (9–3 Big Ten)
- Head coach: J. Craig Ruby (13th season)
- Captain: Frank Froschauer
- Home arena: Huff Hall

1934–35 Big Ten Conference men's basketball standings
	Conf.				Overall
Team	W		L	PCT	W		L	PCT
Purdue	9	–	3	.750	17	–	3	.850
Illinois	9	–	3	.750	15	–	5	.750
Wisconsin	9	–	3	.750	15	–	5	.750
Indiana	8	–	4	.667	14	–	6	.700
Ohio State	8	–	4	.667	13	–	6	.684
Iowa	6	–	6	.500	10	–	9	.526
Minnesota	5	–	7	.417	11	–	9	.550
Northwestern	3	–	9	.250	10	–	10	.500
Michigan	2	–	10	.167	8	–	12	.400
Chicago	1	–	11	.083	2	–	18	.100

The 1934–35 Illinois Fighting Illini men's basketball team represented the University of Illinois.

== Regular season ==
The 1934–35 season brought the fourth conference title at the University of Illinois as well as the second title in Craig Ruby's tenure. Ruby had previously won a title in his second season, 1923–24. A new star on the playing floor emerged during the 1934–35 season with the addition of Harry Combes to the roster. Combes, a three-year letterwinner, starred for the Illini from 1935 to 1937 and later returned to his alma mater as head coach of the Illini in 1948. Combes helped lead Illinois to both its Big Ten titles in the 1930s. Along with future head coach Combes the Illini only returned 6 lettermen from a team that had finished in fourth place in the Big Ten the year before. Even though the Fighting Illini lost twice to Indiana, they improved in conference play by finishing with a record of 9 wins and 3 losses. The team finished the season with an overall record of 15 wins 5 losses with one of the losses coming as the result of playing two games on December 10, 1934. The starting lineup included captain Frank Froschauer and Roy Guttschow at forward, Harry Combes, Jack Benyon and Wilbur Henry at guard, with Lewis Dehner at the center position.

=== Roster ===
"1934–35 Fighting Illini men's basketball team"

1934–35 Illinois Fighting Illini men's basketball team
Players
Coaches

Pos.	#	Name	Height	Weight	Year	Hometown
G	3	Jack Beynon	—	—	Sr	Rockford, Illinois
F	4	Roy Guttschow	—	—	Sr	Bloomington, Illinois
G	5	Grant Mickelson	—	—	So
G	6	Wilbur Henry	—	—	So	North Hollywood, California
C	7	Lewis Dehner	—	—	So	Lincoln, Illinois
F	8	Frank Froschauer (C)	—	—	Sr	Harvey, Illinois
C	10	Harold Swanson	—	—	So	Chicago Heights, Illinois
F	11	Coke Mills	—	—	Jr	Galesburg, Illinois
G	12	Harry Combes	—	—	So	Champaign, Illinois
G	13	Lester Lindberg	—	—	Jr	Lockport, Illinois
C	14	Robert Riegel	—	—	So	Tolono, Illinois
F	15	Byron Blout	—	—	So	Salinas, California
G	16	Howard Braun	—	—	Jr	Champaign, Illinois
F	18	Harold Benham	—	—	Jr	Downers Grove, Illinois
G	19	Paul W. Gibbs	—	—	Jr	Los Angeles, California
G	24	James Vopicka	—	—	So	Berwyn, Illinois
F	29	Martin Markworth	—	—	Jr	Cleveland, Ohio

Head coach

- Craig Ruby (University of Missouri) (13th year)

Assistant coach(es)

Legend

- (C) Team captain
- (S) Suspended
- (I) Ineligible
- (W) Walk-on
- Injured
- Current redshirt

Roster

== Schedule ==
Date time, TV	Rank^{#}	Opponent^{#}	Result	Record	Site (attendance) city, state
Non-Conference regular season
12/10/1934*		DePaul	L 26–29	0–1	Huff Hall (6,000); Champaign, IL
12/10/1934*		Bradley	W 55–25	1–1	Huff Hall (6,000); Champaign, IL
12/14/1934*		Wabash College	W 30–27	2–1	Huff Hall (6,000); Champaign, IL
12/21/1934*		at Washington (St. Louis)	W 35–18	3–1	Francis Gymnasium (3,000); St. Louis, MO
12/22/1934*		at St. Louis	W 33–22	4–1	Kiel Auditorium (4,000); St. Louis, MO
12/29/1934*		at Butler	L 24–39	4–2	Hinkle Fieldhouse (5,000); Indianapolis, IN
1/1/1935*		at Wabash College	W 35–28	5–2	Chadwick Court (–); Crawfordsville, IN
Big Ten regular season
1/5/1935		Indiana; Rivalry	L 21–36	5–3 (0–1)	Huff Hall (5,000); Champaign, IL
1/7/1935		Purdue	W 37–36	6–3 (1–1)	Huff Hall (8,000); Champaign, IL
1/12/1935		at Ohio State	W 44–23	7–3 (2–1)	Ohio Expo Center Coliseum (5,500); Columbus, OH
1/14/1935		at Indiana; Rivalry	L 29–42	7–4 (2–2)	IU Fieldhouse (5,000); Bloomington, IN
1/19/1935		Michigan	W 34–22	8–4 (3–2)	Huff Hall (7,000); Champaign, IL
2/5/1935*		Notre Dame	W 27–26	9–4	Huff Hall (6,000); Champaign, IL
2/9/1935		at University of Chicago	W 43–36	10–4 (4–2)	Henry Crown Field House (2,500); Chicago, IL
2/16/1935		at Purdue	L 27–35	10–5 (4–3)	Jefferson High School (5,000); West Lafayette, IN
2/18/1935		Ohio State	W 43–36	11–5 (5–3)	Huff Hall (6,000); Champaign, IL
2/23/1935		at Minnesota	W 38–34	12–5 (6–3)	Williams Arena (7,500); Minneapolis, MN
2/25/1935		University of Chicago	W 39–29	13–5 (7–3)	Huff Hall (6,000); Champaign, IL
3/2/1935		Minnesota	W 38–34	14–5 (8–3)	Huff Hall (6,000); Champaign, IL
1/19/1935		at Michigan	W 36–22	15–5 (9–3)	Yost Field House (–); Ann Arbor, MI
*Non-conference game. ^{#}Rankings from AP Poll. (#) Tournament seedings in parentheses. All times are in Central Time.
