= 1931–32 NCAA men's basketball season =

Men's collegiate basketball season

- Helms National Champions: Purdue (retroactive selection in 1943)
- Player of the Year (Helms): John Wooden, Purdue (retroactive selection in 1944)

The 1931–32 NCAA men's basketball season began in December 1931, progressed through the regular season and conference tournaments, and concluded in March 1932.

== Season headlines ==
- The Border Conference began play, with five original members.
- Purdue senior guard John Wooden became the first three-time All-American.
- In February 1943, the Helms Athletic Foundation retroactively selected Purdue as its national champion for the 1931–32 season.
- In 1995, the Premo-Porretta Power Poll retroactively selected Purdue as its top-ranked team for the 1931–32 season.

== Conference membership changes ==
School	Former conference	New conference
Ada Teachers College Tigers	Independent	Non-major basketball program
Arizona Wildcats	Independent	Border Conference
Arizona State Teachers–Flagstaff Lumberjacks	Independent	Border Conference
Arizona State Teachers Bulldogs	Independent	Border Conference
New Mexico Lobos	Independent	Border Conference
New Mexico A&M Aggies	Independent	Border Conference

== Regular season ==
=== Conferences ===
==== Conference winners and tournaments ====
Conference	Regular season winner	Conference player of the year	Conference tournament	Tournament venue (City)	Tournament winner
Big Six Conference	Kansas	None selected	No Tournament		
Big Ten Conference	Purdue	None selected	No Tournament		
Border Conference	Arizona	None selected	No Tournament		
Eastern Intercollegiate Basketball League	Princeton	None selected	No Tournament		
Missouri Valley Conference	Creighton	None selected	No Tournament		
Pacific Coast Conference	Washington (North); USC (South)		No Tournament; USC defeated Washington in best-of-three conference championship playoff series		
Rocky Mountain Athletic Conference	Wyoming (Eastern); BYU & Utah (Western)		No Tournament		
Southern Conference	Kentucky & Maryland	None selected	1932 Southern Conference men's basketball tournament	Municipal Auditorium (Atlanta, Georgia)	Georgia
Southwest Conference	Baylor	None selected	No Tournament		

==== Conference standings ====
1931–32 Big Six Conference men's basketball standings
	Conf.				Overall
Team	W		L	PCT	W		L	PCT
Kansas	7	–	3	.700	13	–	5	.722
Oklahoma	6	–	4	.600	9	–	5	.643
Missouri	6	–	4	.600	9	–	9	.500
Kansas State	5	–	5	.500	7	–	8	.467
Iowa State	4	–	6	.400	9	–	6	.600
Nebraska	2	–	8	.200	3	–	17	.150

1931–32 Big Ten Conference men's basketball standings
	Conf.				Overall
Team	W		L	PCT	W		L	PCT
Purdue	11	–	1	.917	17	–	1	.944
Minnesota	9	–	3	.750	15	–	3	.833
Northwestern	9	–	3	.750	13	–	5	.722
Michigan	8	–	4	.667	11	–	6	.647
Illinois	7	–	5	.583	11	–	6	.647
Ohio State	5	–	7	.417	9	–	9	.500
Indiana	4	–	8	.333	8	–	10	.444
Wisconsin	3	–	9	.250	8	–	10	.444
Iowa	3	–	9	.250	5	–	12	.294
Chicago	1	–	11	.083	2	–	15	.118

1931–32 Border Conference men's basketball standings
	Conf.				Overall
Team	W		L	PCT	W		L	PCT
Arizona	8	–	2	.800	18	–	2	.900
Arizona State Teachers–Flagstaff	8	–	4	.667	9	–	8	.529
New Mexico	5	–	5	.500	10	–	6	.625
Arizona State Teachers	4	–	8	.333	7	–	12	.368
New Mexico A&M	1	–	7	.125	9	–	10	.474

1931–32 Eastern Intercollegiate Basketball League standings
	Conf.				Overall
Team	W		L	PCT	W		L	PCT
Princeton	8	–	2	.800	18	–	4	.818
Columbia	8	–	2	.800	16	–	6	.727
Cornell	6	–	4	.600	10	–	10	.500
Dartmouth	5	–	5	.500	15	–	6	.714
Penn	2	–	8	.200	10	–	11	.476
Yale	1	–	9	.100	10	–	12	.455

1931–32 Missouri Valley Conference men's basketball standings
	Conf.				Overall
Team	W		L	PCT	W		L	PCT
Creighton	8	–	0	1.000	17	–	4	.810
Grinnell	5	–	3	.625	8	–	8	.500
Washington University	3	–	5	.375	10	–	9	.526
Oklahoma A&M	2	–	6	.250	4	–	15	.211
Drake	2	–	6	.250	2	–	17	.105

1931–32 Pacific Coast Conference men's basketball standings
	Conf.				Overall
Team	W		L	PCT	W		L	PCT
North
Washington	12	–	4	.750	19	–	6	.760
Washington State	11	–	5	.688	22	–	5	.815
Oregon State	7	–	9	.438	13	–	11	.542
Oregon	7	–	9	.438	13	–	11	.542
Idaho	2	–	14	.125	8	–	16	.333
South
California †	8	–	3	.727	16	–	8	.667
USC	8	–	3	.727	10	–	12	.455
UCLA	4	–	7	.364	9	–	10	.474
Stanford	2	–	9	.182	6	–	13	.316
† Conference playoff series winner

1931–32 Rocky Mountain Conference men's basketball standings
	Conf.				Overall
Team	W		L	PCT	W		L	PCT
Eastern
Wyoming	12	–	0	1.000	18	–	2	.900
Northern Colorado	10	–	4	.714	10	–	4	.714
Colorado College	10	–	4	.714	14	–	6	.700
Colorado	9	–	5	.643	10	–	7	.588
Colorado Agricultural	4	–	8	.333	4	–	8	.333
Western State	2	–	8	.200	3	–	8	.273
Denver	2	–	12	.143	3	–	15	.167
Colorado Mines	1	–	9	.100	1	–	9	.100
Western
BYU	8	–	4	.667	20	–	12	.625
Utah	8	–	4	.667	14	–	9	.609
Montana State	6	–	6	.500	14	–	15	.483
Utah State	2	–	10	.167	7	–	15	.318

1931–32 Southern Conference men's basketball standings
	Conf.				Overall
Team	W		L	PCT	W		L	PCT
Kentucky	9	–	1	.900	15	–	2	.882
Maryland	9	–	1	.900	16	–	4	.800
Auburn	9	–	2	.818	12	–	3	.800
Alabama	11	–	3	.786	16	–	4	.800
North Carolina	6	–	3	.667	16	–	5	.762
Virginia	6	–	3	.667	13	–	8	.619
Georgia †	7	–	4	.636	19	–	7	.731
Ole Miss	8	–	5	.615	9	–	6	.600
Georgia Tech	5	–	3	.625	7	–	6	.538
NC State	6	–	4	.600	10	–	6	.625
Duke	6	–	5	.545	14	–	11	.560
LSU	8	–	8	.500	11	–	9	.550
Tennessee	5	–	5	.500	8	–	7	.533
South Carolina	2	–	2	.500	9	–	7	.563
Vanderbilt	5	–	7	.417	8	–	11	.421
Mississippi A&M	4	–	7	.364	5	–	10	.333
Tulane	5	–	9	.357	6	–	10	.375
Florida	4	–	10	.286	8	–	12	.400
Washington and Lee	3	–	8	.273	9	–	10	.474
Virginia Tech	2	–	8	.200	8	–	9	.471
Clemson	2	–	9	.182	8	–	12	.400
Sewanee	1	–	7	.125	3	–	9	.250
VMI	0	–	9	.000	0	–	14	.000
† Southern Conference Tournament winner

1931–32 Southwest Conference men's basketball standings
	Conf.				Overall
Team	W		L	PCT	W		L	PCT
Baylor	10	–	2	.833	14	–	4	.778
TCU	9	–	3	.750	18	–	4	.818
Arkansas	8	–	4	.667	18	–	6	.750
Texas	5	–	7	.417	13	–	9	.591
Texas A&M	4	–	8	.333	10	–	9	.526
Rice	4	–	8	.333	5	–	9	.357
SMU	2	–	10	.167	9	–	13	.409

=== Major independents ===
A total of 84 college teams played as major independents. Dakota Wesleyan (19–1) had the best winning percentage (.950), and Northwest Missouri State (26–2) finished with the most wins.

1931–32 NCAA men's basketball independents standings
	Conf.				Overall
Team	W		L	PCT	W		L	PCT
Dakota Wesleyan		–		–	19	–	1	.950
Carleton		–		–	17	–	1	.944
CCNY		–		–	16	–	1	.941
Mount Union		–		–	16	–	1	.941
Furman		–		–	15	–	1	.938
Northwest Missouri State		–		–	26	–	2	.929
Canisius		–		–	11	–	1	.917
Notre Dame		–		–	18	–	2	.900
Westminster (Pa.)		–		–	16	–	2	.889
Loyola (Ill.)		–		–	15	–	2	.882
DePauw		–		–	14	–	2	.875
West Texas State		–		–	20	–	3	.870
St. John's (N.Y.)		–		–	22	–	4	.846
Navy		–		–	13	–	3	.813
Rhode Island State		–		–	13	–	3	.813
LIU		–		–	16	–	4	.800
Niagara		–		–	19	–	5	.792
Providence		–		–	19	–	5	.792
Buffalo		–		–	15	–	4	.789
Santa Clara		–		–	15	–	4	.789
Xavier		–		–	10	–	3	.769
Richmond		–		–	9	–	3	.750
Butler		–		–	14	–	5	.737
Colgate		–		–	14	–	5	.737
Western State Teachers		–		–	14	–	5	.737
George Washington		–		–	11	–	4	.733
Lafayette		–		–	10	–	4	.714
Michigan State		–		–	12	–	5	.706
Duquesne		–		–	14	–	6	.700
San Francisco		–		–	11	–	5	.688
Saint Louis		–		–	13	–	6	.684
William & Mary		–		–	13	–	6	.684
Louisville		–		–	15	–	7	.682
Army		–		–	10	–	5	.667
Indiana State		–		–	10	–	5	.667
Springfield (Mass.)		–		–	10	–	5	.667
La Salle		–		–	15	–	8	.652
Western Kentucky State		–		–	15	–	8	.652
Temple		–		–	13	–	7	.650
Manhattan		–		–	14	–	8	.636
Wichita Municipal		–		–	12	–	7	.632
Syracuse		–		–	13	–	8	.619
DePaul		–		–	9	–	6	.600
Tulsa		–		–	10	–	7	.588
Marquette		–		–	11	–	8	.579
Fordham		–		–	10	–	8	.556
Seton Hall		–		–	10	–	9	.526
Ohio		–		–	11	–	10	.524
Detroit		–		–	8	–	8	.500
Loyola (Md.)		–		–	8	–	8	.500
New York University		–		–	6	–	6	.500
Valparaiso		–		–	12	–	12	.500
Toledo		–		–	8	–	9	.471
Pittsburgh		–		–	14	–	16	.467
Harvard		–		–	6	–	7	.462
Texas State M&M		–		–	6	–	7	.462
Marshall		–		–	8	–	10	.444
St. Joseph's		–		–	8	–	10	.444
Saint Mary's (Calif.)		–		–	11	–	14	.440
Bucknell		–		–	7	–	9	.438
The Citadel		–		–	8	–	11	.421
Bradley		–		–	7	–	10	.412
Saint Francis (N.Y.)		–		–	9	–	13	.409
Penn State		–		–	6	–	9	.400
St. Bonaventure		–		–	4	–	6	.400
Texas Tech		–		–	9	–	14	.391
Villanova		–		–	7	–	11	.389
Washburn		–		–	7	–	11	.389
Boston University		–		–	5	–	8	.385
Miami (Ohio)		–		–	6	–	10	.375
Georgetown		–		–	6	–	11	.353
Lehigh		–		–	6	–	11	.353
Bowling Green State		–		–	6	–	12	.333
Wake Forest		–		–	4	–	8	.333
West Virginia		–		–	7	–	14	.333
Rutgers		–		–	4	–	9	.308
Montana		–		–	6	–	14	.300
Cincinnati		–		–	4	–	11	.267
Connecticut		–		–	3	–	11	.214
Muhlenberg		–		–	4	–	15	.211
Davidson		–		–	3	–	12	.200
Dayton		–		–	3	–	12	.200
Kent State		–		–	2	–	13	.133
Brown		–		–	2	–	14	.125

== Awards ==
=== Consensus All-American team ===
Consensus Team
Player	Class	Team
Lou Bender	Senior	Columbia
Boze Berger	Senior	Maryland
Moose Krause	Sophomore	Notre Dame
Forest Sale	Junior	Kentucky
Les Witte	Sophomore	Wyoming
John Wooden	Senior	Purdue

=== Major player of the year awards ===
- Helms Player of the Year: John Wooden, Purdue (retroactive selection in 1944)

== Coaching changes ==
A number of teams changed coaches during the season and after it ended.

Team	Former Coach	Interim Coach	New Coach	Reason
Boston University	Win Karlson		John Harmon	
Bucknell	John Plant		Malcolm Musser	Plant stayed on to continue coaching Track & Field and athletic director.
Cincinnati	Frank E. Rice		John Halliday	
Colgate	Lloyd Jordan		Robert C. Hubbard	Jordan left to coach Amherst.
Denver	Stuart Clark		Cac Hubbard	
Drake	Bill Doelter		Evan O. Williams	
George Washington	Jim Pixlee		Ted O'Leary	Pixlee stayed to continue the athletic duties.
Indiana State	J. Roy Goodland		David Glascock	
Lehigh	Roy Geary		Fay Bartlett	
Louisville	Edward Weber		C. V. Money	
Montana	John W. Stewart		Adolph J. Lewandowski	
Nebraska	Charlie T. Black		William Browne	
Penn State	Burke Hermann		Earl Leslie	
Princeton	Albert Wittmer		Fritz Crisler	
Rice	Russell Daugherty		Jimmy Kitts	
Rider	Paul Frank		Frank Donlon	
San Francisco	Phil Morrissey		Wally Cameron	
South Carolina	Rock Norman		Billy Laval	
Saint Francis (N.Y.)	George Hinchcliffe		Rody Cooney	
Tulsa	Oliver Hodge		Chet Benefiel	
Virginia Tech	George S. Proctor		William L. Younger	
