= List of Georgia Bulldogs head basketball coaches =

The following is a list of Georgia Bulldogs men's basketball head coaches. The Bulldogs have had 25 coaches in their 116-season history.

No.	Name	Tenure	Record	Pct.
1	Walter T. Forbes	1905–1907	2–2	.500
2	C. O. Heidler	1907–1910, 1911–1912	16–6	.727
3	W. A. Cunningham	1910–1911, 1916–1917	10–6	.625
4	Howell Peacock	1912–1916	30–7	.811
5	Alfred W. Scott	1917–1918	6–1	.857
6	Kennon Mott	1918–1919	5–3	.625
7	Herman Stegeman	1920–1931	170–78	.685
8	Rex Enright	1931–1937	69–51	.575
9	Vernon Smith	1937–1938	1–1	.500
10	Frank Johnson	1938	8–5	.615
11	Elmer A. Lampe	1938–1946	82–84	.499
12	Ralph Jordan	1946–1950	44–39	.530
13	Jim Whatley	1950–1951	24–18	.571
14	Harbin Lawson	1952–1965	112–241	.317
15	Ken Rosemond	1966–1973	92–111	.453
16	John Guthrie	1974–1978	46–86	.348
17	Hugh Durham	1979–1995	297–215†	.580
18	Tubby Smith	1996–1997	45–19	.703
19	Ron Jirsa	1998–1999	35–30	.538
20	Jim Harrick	2000–2003	37–52‡	.416
21	Dennis Felton	2004–2009	84–91	.480
22	Pete Herrmann	2009 (interim)	3–9	.250
23	Mark Fox	2009–2018	163–133	.551
24	Tom Crean	2018–2022	47–75	.385
25	Mike White	2022–present	78–57	.578

† – Does not include 1 win and 1 loss from the 1985 NCAA tournament vacated due to sanctions.

‡ – Does not include 30 wins and 1 loss vacated due to sanctions.
