= 1931–32 Georgia Bulldogs basketball team =

American college basketball team season

1931–32 Georgia Bulldogs basketball

SoCon tournament champion
- Conference: Southern Conference
- Record: 19–7 (7–4 SoCon)
- Head coach: Rex Enright (1st season)
- Captain: Vernon Smith
- Home arena: Woodruff Hall

1931–32 Southern Conference men's basketball standings
	Conf.				Overall
Team	W		L	PCT	W		L	PCT
Kentucky	9	–	1	.900	15	–	2	.882
Maryland	9	–	1	.900	16	–	4	.800
Auburn	9	–	2	.818	12	–	3	.800
Alabama	11	–	3	.786	16	–	4	.800
North Carolina	6	–	3	.667	16	–	5	.762
Virginia	6	–	3	.667	13	–	8	.619
Georgia †	7	–	4	.636	19	–	7	.731
Ole Miss	8	–	5	.615	9	–	6	.600
Georgia Tech	5	–	3	.625	7	–	6	.538
NC State	6	–	4	.600	10	–	6	.625
Duke	6	–	5	.545	14	–	11	.560
LSU	8	–	8	.500	11	–	9	.550
Tennessee	5	–	5	.500	8	–	7	.533
South Carolina	2	–	2	.500	9	–	7	.563
Vanderbilt	5	–	7	.417	8	–	11	.421
Mississippi A&M	4	–	7	.364	5	–	10	.333
Tulane	5	–	9	.357	6	–	10	.375
Florida	4	–	10	.286	8	–	12	.400
Washington and Lee	3	–	8	.273	9	–	10	.474
Virginia Tech	2	–	8	.200	8	–	9	.471
Clemson	2	–	9	.182	8	–	12	.400
Sewanee	1	–	7	.125	3	–	9	.250
VMI	0	–	9	.000	0	–	14	.000
† Southern Conference Tournament winner

The 1931–32 Georgia Bulldogs basketball team represented the University of Georgia as a member of the Southern Conference (SoCon) during the 1931–32 NCAA men's basketball season. Led by first-year head coach Rex Enright, the Bulldogs compiled an overall record of 19–7 with a mark of 7–4 in conference play, placing seventh in the SoCon. Georgia won the 1932 Southern Conference men's basketball tournament. The team captain was Vernon Smith.

== Roster ==
1931–32 Georgia Bulldogs men's basketball team
Players
Coaches

Pos.	#	Name	Height	Weight	Year	Previous school	Hometown
		Frank Terrell	—	—
		Tommy Moran	—	—
		Stokely Pound	—	—
		Flip Costa	—	—
		Bill Strickland	—	—
		Vernon Smith	—	—
		Leroy Young	—	—
		Joe Chandler	—	—

Head coach

Rex Enright

Assistant coach(es)

Legend

- (C) Team captain
- (S) Suspended
- (I) Ineligible
- (W) Walk-on
- Injured
- Current redshirt

== Schedule ==
Date time, TV	Opponent	Result	Record	Site city, state
12/24/1931	Atlanta YMCA	W 39-32	1–0	
12/28/1931	T.N.T.	W 43-17	2–0	
12/30/1931	Fort Benning	W 35-19	3–0	
1/1/1932	Chattanooga	W 22-16	4–0	
1/2/1932	Chattanooga	W 26-19	5–0	
1/3/1932	Chattanooga	W 38-26	6–0	
1/9/1932	at Tennessee	L 17-24	6–1	
1/16/1932	N.Y. Celtics	L 35-45	6–2	
1/22/1932	Tennessee	W 38-19	7–2	
1/27/1932	at Mercer	W 42-26	8–2	
1/28/1932	at Mercer	W 31-25	9–2	
1/30/1932	at Ga. Tech	L 20-30	9–3	
2/2/1932	Clemson	W 41-26	10–3	
2/6/1932	Ga. Tech	W 25-15	11–3	
2/9/1932	Clemson	W 40-16	12–3	
2/11/1932	at Stetson	L 27-30	12–4	
2/12/1932	at Florida	W 38-33	13–4	
2/13/1932	at Florida	L 27-47	13–5	
2/16/1932	at Auburn	L 24-26	13–6	
2/18/1932	Florida	W 36-20	14–6	
2/19/1932	Florida	W 39-20	15–6	
2/20/1932	at Ga.Tech	L 22-25	15–7	
2/26/1932	Mississippi St.	W 48-26	16–7	
2/27/1932	Virginia	W 40-19	17–7	
2/28/1932	Duke	W 43-32	18–7	
3/1/1932	North Carolina	W 26-24	19–7	
*Non-conference game. (#) Tournament seedings in parentheses.
