= 1937–38 Georgia Bulldogs basketball team =

American college basketball season

1937–38 Georgia Bulldogs basketball
- Conference: Southeastern Conference
- Record: 12–10 (4–6 SEC)
- Head coach: Vernon Smith (1st season; first 2 games); Frank Johnson (1st season; next 13 games); Elmer A. Lampe (1st season; final 7 games)
- Captain: Jack Farren
- Home arena: Woodruff Hall

1937–38 Southeastern Conference men's basketball standings
	Conf.				Overall
Team	W		L	PCT	W		L	PCT
Kentucky	6	–	0	1.000	13	–	5	.722
Ole Miss	11	–	2	.846	22	–	12	.647
Georgia Tech †	9	–	2	.818	18	–	2	.900
Auburn	6	–	3	.667	14	–	5	.737
Tennessee	7	–	4	.636	15	–	8	.652
LSU	7	–	6	.538	10	–	10	.500
Tulane	5	–	6	.455	8	–	10	.444
Mississippi State	7	–	9	.438	9	–	12	.429
Georgia	4	–	6	.400	12	–	10	.545
Vanderbilt	4	–	8	.333	9	–	12	.429
Florida	3	–	7	.300	11	–	9	.550
Alabama	4	–	12	.250	4	–	13	.235
Sewanee	2	–	10	.167	4	–	13	.235
† Regular-season championship and SEC Tournament winner

The 1937–38 Georgia Bulldogs basketball team represented the University of Georgia as a member of the Southeastern Conference (SEC) during the 1937–38 NCAA men's basketball season. Led by three head coaches, the Bulldogs compiled an overall record of 12–10 with a mark of 4–6 in conference play, placing ninth in the SEC. The team captain was Jack Farren.

Rex Enright had served as the head Georgia's head basketball coach for the prior six seasons. In late December 1937, he was hired as the head football coach at the University of South Carolina. Vernon Smith coached the Bulldogs for their first two games of the season, in early January, before leaving Georgia to become an assistant under Enright at South Carolina. On January 10, 1938, Georgia's athletic board named Elmer A. Lampe of Carroll College in Waukesha, Wisconsin as the school's new head basketball coach and ends coach for the Georgia Bulldogs football team under Joel Hunt, newly hired as head football coach. At that time, Frank Johnson was appointed head coach of Georgia's basketball team, as Lampe was not scheduled to come to Georgia until February, at which time he would be occupied with spring football training. Johnson left Georgia on February 20, following Harry Mehre, who had been head coach of Georgia's football team since 1928, to the University of Mississippi. Lampe then took charge of the Georgia basketball team.

== Schedule ==
Date time, TV	Opponent	Result	Record	Site (attendance) city, state
January 4, 1938*	South Carolina	W 26–24	1–0	(1,800); Athens, GA
January 7, 1938*	NC State	L 21–24	1–1	Athens, GA
January 11, 1938*	Clemson	W 26–22	2–1	Athens, GA
January 14, 1938	at Florida	W 34–31	3–1	
January 15, 1938	at Florida	L 32–38	3–2	
January 21, 1938*	Chattanooga	W 42–18	4–2	Athens, GA
January 22, 1938*	Chattanooga	W 31–23	5–2	Athens, GA
January 23, 1938*	Chattanooga	W 32–30	6–2	Athens, GA
January 25, 1938	at Sewanee	W 24–16	7–2	
January 29, 1938	at Georgia Tech	L 28–51	7–3	
January 31, 1938*	at South Carolina	W 36–22	8–3	
February 4, 1938	Florida	L 36–41	8–4	Athens, GA
February 5, 1938	Florida	W 28–27	9–4	Athens, GA
February 8, 1938*	at Clemson	L 28–40	9–5	
February 9, 1938	Sewanee	W 46–22	10–5	Athens, GA
February 12, 1938	at Auburn	L 27–34	10–6	
February 14, 1938	at Alabama	L 26–38	10–7	
February 16, 1938*	Mercer	W 47–38	11–7	Athens, GA
February 19, 1938	Georgia Tech	L 27–29	11–8	Athens, GA
February 25, 1938*	at Erskine	W 39–27	12–8	
February 28, 1938*	Mercer	L 24–34	12–9	Athens, GA
March 3, 1938*	vs. Tulane; SEC tournament first round	L 36–47	12–10	Huey P. Long Field House; Baton Rouge, LA
*Non-conference game. (#) Tournament seedings in parentheses.
