= List of Georgia Tech Yellow Jackets men's basketball seasons =

This is a list of seasons completed by the Georgia Tech Yellow Jackets men's college basketball team.

== Seasons ==
Record table
| Season | Coach | Overall | Conference | Standing | Postseason |
|---|---|---|---|---|---|
No team (Independent) (1905–1906)
| 1905–06 | Chapman | 2–1 | | | |
No team (Independent) (1906–1908)
John Heisman (Independent) (1909–1914)
| 1908–09 | John Heisman | 1–6 | | | |
No team (Independent) (1909–1912)
| 1912–13 | John Heisman | 2–6 | | | |
| 1913–14 | John Heisman | 6–2 | | | |
No team (Independent) (1914–1919)
William Alexander (Independent) (1919–1920)
| 1919–20 | William Alexander | 7–10 | | | |
Joseph Bean (Southern) (1920–1921)
| 1920–21 | Joseph Bean | 4–10 | | | |
William Alexander (Southern) (1921–1924)
| 1921–22 | William Alexander | 11–6 | 2–3 | 9th | |
| 1922–23 | William Alexander | 9–9 | 5–3 | 7th | |
| 1923–24 | William Alexander | 9–13 | 4–5 | 10th | |
Harold Hansen (Southern) (1924–1926)
| 1924–25 | Harold Hansen | 4–12 | 2–7 | 13th | |
| 1925–26 | Harold Hansen | 6–11 | 4–10 | 14th | |
Roy Mundorff (Southern) (1926–1932)
| 1926–27 | Roy Mundorff | 17–10 | 8–2 | 3rd | |
| 1927–28 | Roy Mundorff | 10–7 | | | |
| 1928–29 | Roy Mundorff | 15–6 | 10–2 | 3rd | |
| 1929–30 | Roy Mundorff | 11–13 | 5–8 | 15th | |
| 1930–31 | Roy Mundorff | 11–13 | 8–7 | 8th | |
| 1931–32 | Roy Mundorff | 7–6 | 5–3 | 9th | |
Roy Mundorff (SEC) (1932–1943)
| 1932–33 | Roy Mundorff | 9–6 | 7–5 | 5th | |
| 1933–34 | Roy Mundorff | 6–12 | 5–8 | 7th | |
| 1934–35 | Roy Mundorff | 6–8 | 5–6 | 8th | |
| 1935–36 | Roy Mundorff | 10–8 | 7–5 | T–8th | |
| 1936–37 | Roy Mundorff | 13–2 | 10–0 | 2nd | |
| 1937–38 | Roy Mundorff | 18–2 | 9–2 | 1st | |
| 1938–39 | Roy Mundorff | 6–9 | 4–7 | 9th | |
| 1939–40 | Roy Mundorff | 7–8 | 6–6 | T–6th | |
| 1940–41 | Roy Mundorff | 8–11 | 4–8 | 10th | |
| 1941–42 | Roy Mundorff | 8–8 | 4–7 | 8th | |
| 1942–43 | Roy Mundorff | 11–5 | 7–4 | 5th | |
Dwight Keith (SEC) (1943–1946)
| 1943–44 | Dwight Keith | 14–4 | 2–0 | 3rd | |
| 1944–45 | Dwight Keith | 11–6 | 7–4 | 5th | |
| 1945–46 | Dwight Keith | 10–11 | 7–7 | T–6th | |
Roy McArthur (SEC) (1946–1951)
| 1946–47 | Roy McArthur | 12–11 | 6–6 | T–6th | |
| 1947–48 | Roy McArthur | 12–16 | 6–10 | T–8th | |
| 1948–49 | Roy McArthur | 11–13 | 7–9 | 7th | |
| 1949–50 | Roy McArthur | 14–13 | 7–9 | 8th | |
| 1950–51 | Roy McArthur | 8–19 | 6–8 | T–5th | |
Whack Hyder (SEC) (1951–1964)
| 1951–52 | Whack Hyder | 7–15 | 2–12 | T–11th | |
| 1952–53 | Whack Hyder | 5–17 | 4–9 | 10th | |
| 1953–54 | Whack Hyder | 2–22 | 0–14 | 12th | |
| 1954–55 | Whack Hyder | 12–13 | 7–7 | T–6th | |
| 1955–56 | Whack Hyder | 12–11 | 6–8 | T–6th | |
| 1956–57 | Whack Hyder | 18–8 | 9–5 | T–3rd | |
| 1957–58 | Whack Hyder | 15–11 | 8–6 | T–5th | |
| 1958–59 | Whack Hyder | 17–9 | 9–5 | 4th | |
| 1959–60 | Whack Hyder | 22–6 | 11–3 | 2nd | NCAA University Division Elite Eight |
| 1960–61 | Whack Hyder | 13–13 | 6–8 | T–6th | |
| 1961–62 | Whack Hyder | 10–16 | 4–10 | 10th | |
| 1962–63 | Whack Hyder | 21–5 | 10–4 | T–2nd | |
| 1963–64 | Whack Hyder | 17–9 | 9–5 | T–2nd | |
Whack Hyder (Independent) (1964–1973)
| 1964–65 | Whack Hyder | 14–11 | | | |
| 1965–66 | Whack Hyder | 13–13 | | | |
| 1966–67 | Whack Hyder | 17–9 | | | |
| 1967–68 | Whack Hyder | 12–13 | | | |
| 1968–69 | Whack Hyder | 12–13 | | | |
| 1969–70 | Whack Hyder | 17–10 | | | NIT Quarterfinal |
| 1970–71 | Whack Hyder | 23–9 | | | NIT Runner–up |
| 1971–72 | Whack Hyder | 6–20 | | | |
| 1972–73 | Whack Hyder | 7–18 | | | |
Dwane Morrison (Independent) (1973–1975)
| 1973–74 | Dwane Morrison | 5–21 | | | |
| 1974–75 | Dwane Morrison | 11–15 | | | |
Dwane Morrison (Metro) (1975–1978)
| 1975–76 | Dwayne Morrison | 13–14 | 0–1 | 5th | |
| 1976–77 | Dwane Morrison | 18–10 | 3–3 | T–3rd | |
| 1977–78 | Dwane Morrison | 15–12 | 6–6 | T–4th | |
Dwane Morrison (Independent) (1978–1979)
| 1978–79 | Dwane Morrison | 17–9 | | | |
Dwane Morrison (ACC) (1979–1981)
| 1979–80 | Dwane Morrison | 8–18 | 1–13 | 8th | |
| 1980–81 | Dwane Morrison | 4–23 | 0–14 | 8th | |
Bobby Cremins (ACC) (1981–2000)
| 1981–82 | Bobby Cremins | 10–16 | 3–11 | 8th | |
| 1982–83 | Bobby Cremins | 13–15 | 4–10 | 6th | |
| 1983–84 | Bobby Cremins | 18–11 | 6–8 | T–5th | NIT First Round |
| 1984–85 | Bobby Cremins | 27–8 | 9–5 | T–1st | NCAA Division I Elite Eight |
| 1985–86 | Bobby Cremins | 27–7 | 11–3 | 2nd | NCAA Division I Sweet Sixteen |
| 1986–87 | Bobby Cremins | 16–13 | 7–7 | 5th | NCAA Division I First Round |
| 1987–88 | Bobby Cremins | 22–10 | 8–6 | 4th | NCAA Division I Second Round |
| 1988–89 | Bobby Cremins | 20–12 | 8–6 | 5th | NCAA Division I First Round |
| 1989–90 | Bobby Cremins | 28–7 | 8–6 | T–3rd | NCAA Division I Final Four |
| 1990–91 | Bobby Cremins | 17–13 | 6–8 | T–5th | NCAA Division I Second Round |
| 1991–92 | Bobby Cremins | 23–12 | 8–8 | T–4th | NCAA Division I Sweet Sixteen |
| 1992–93 | Bobby Cremins | 19–11 | 8–8 | 6th | NCAA Division I First Round |
| 1993–94 | Bobby Cremins | 16–13 | 7–9 | 6th | NIT First Round |
| 1994–95 | Bobby Cremins | 18–12 | 8–8 | 5th | |
| 1995–96 | Bobby Cremins | 24–12 | 13–3 | 1st | NCAA Division I Sweet Sixteen |
| 1996–97 | Bobby Cremins | 9–18 | 3–13 | 9th | |
| 1997–98 | Bobby Cremins | 19–14 | 6–10 | 6th | NIT Quarterfinal |
| 1998–99 | Bobby Cremins | 15–16 | 6–10 | T–5th | NIT First Round |
| 1999–00 | Bobby Cremins | 13–17 | 5–11 | 8th | |
| Bobby Cremins: | | 354–237 | | | |
Paul Hewitt (ACC) (2000–2011)
| 2000–01 | Paul Hewitt | 17–13 | 8–8 | 5th | NCAA Division I First Round |
| 2001–02 | Paul Hewitt | 15–16 | 7–9 | T–5th | |
| 2002–03 | Paul Hewitt | 16–15 | 7–9 | 5th | NIT Quarterfinal |
| 2003–04 | Paul Hewitt | 28–10 | 9–7 | T–4th | NCAA Division I Runner–up |
| 2004–05 | Paul Hewitt | 20–12 | 8–8 | T–4th | NCAA Division I Second Round |
| 2005–06 | Paul Hewitt | 11–17 | 4–12 | 11th | |
| 2006–07 | Paul Hewitt | 20–12 | 8–8 | T–6th | NCAA Division I First Round |
| 2007–08 | Paul Hewitt | 15–17 | 7–9 | T–7th | |
| 2008–09 | Paul Hewitt | 12–19 | 2–14 | 12th | |
| 2009–10 | Paul Hewitt | 23–13 | 7–9 | 7th | NCAA Division I Second Round |
| 2010–11 | Paul Hewitt | 13–18 | 5–11 | T–10th | |
Brian Gregory (ACC) (2011–2016)
| 2011–12 | Brian Gregory | 11–20 | 4–12 | T–11th | |
| 2012–13 | Brian Gregory | 16–15 | 6–12 | T–9th | |
| 2013–14 | Brian Gregory | 16–17 | 6–12 | T–11th | |
| 2014–15 | Brian Gregory | 12–19 | 3–15 | 14th | |
| 2015–16 | Brian Gregory | 21–15 | 8–10 | T–11th | NIT Quarterfinal |
Josh Pastner (ACC) (2016–2023)
| 2016–17 | Josh Pastner | 21–16 | 8–10 | 11th | NIT Runner–up |
| 2017–18 | Josh Pastner | 13–19 | 6–12 | 13th | |
| 2018–19 | Josh Pastner | 14–18 | 6–12 | 10th | |
| 2019–20 | Josh Pastner | 17–14 | 11–9 | 5th | Ineligible |
| 2020–21 | Josh Pastner | 17–9 | 11–6 | 4th | NCAA Division I First Round |
| 2021–22 | Josh Pastner | 12–20 | 5–15 | 14th | |
| 2022–23 | Josh Pastner | 15–18 | 6–14 | 13th | |
Damon Stoudamire (ACC) (2023–2026)
| 2023–24 | Damon Stoudamire | 14–18 | 7–13 | T–12th | |
| 2024–25 | Damon Stoudamire | 17–17 | 10–10 | 8th | NIT First Round |
| 2025–26 | Damon Stoudamire | 11–20 | 2–16 | 18th | |
| Total: | | 1,441–1,306 | | | |
National champion Postseason invitational champion Conference regular season champion Conference regular season and conference tournament champion Division regular season champion Division regular season and conference tournament champion Conference tournament champion
