= 1938 SEC men's basketball tournament =

- Classification: Division I
- Teams: 10
- Site: Huey Long Field House; Baton Rouge, Louisiana
- Champions: Georgia Tech (1st title)
- Winning coach: Roy Mundorff (1st title)

1937–38 Southeastern Conference men's basketball standings
	Conf.				Overall
Team	W		L	PCT	W		L	PCT
Kentucky	6	–	0	1.000	13	–	5	.722
Ole Miss	11	–	2	.846	22	–	12	.647
Georgia Tech †	9	–	2	.818	18	–	2	.900
Auburn	6	–	3	.667	14	–	5	.737
Tennessee	7	–	4	.636	15	–	8	.652
LSU	7	–	6	.538	10	–	10	.500
Tulane	5	–	6	.455	8	–	10	.444
Mississippi State	7	–	9	.438	9	–	12	.429
Georgia	4	–	6	.400	12	–	10	.545
Vanderbilt	4	–	8	.333	9	–	12	.429
Florida	3	–	7	.300	11	–	9	.550
Alabama	4	–	12	.250	4	–	13	.235
Sewanee	2	–	10	.167	4	–	13	.235
† Regular-season championship and SEC Tournament winner

The 1938 Southeastern Conference men's basketball tournament took place on March 3–5, 1938, in Baton Rouge, Louisiana at Huey Long Field House. It was the fifth SEC basketball tournament.

Georgia Tech won the tournament by beating Ole Miss in the championship game.

== Bracket ==
First Round
Tennessee	41
Mississippi State	34
Vanderbilt	50
Alabama	26
Tulane	47
Georgia	36

Quarterfinals
Ole Miss	45
Tennessee	40
LSU	60
Auburn	34
Georgia Tech	50
Vanderbilt	18
Kentucky	36
Tulane	38

Semifinals
Ole Miss	68
LSU	40
Georgia Tech	44
Tulane	29

Finals
Ole Miss	47
Georgia Tech	58
