= 1931–32 Iowa State Cyclones men's basketball team =

American college basketball season

1931–32 Iowa State Cyclones men's basketball
- Conference: Big Six Conference
- Record: 9–6 (4–6 Big Six)
- Head coach: Louis Menze (4th season)
- Home arena: State Gymnasium

1931–32 Big Six Conference men's basketball standings
	Conf.				Overall
Team	W		L	PCT	W		L	PCT
Kansas	7	–	3	.700	13	–	5	.722
Oklahoma	6	–	4	.600	9	–	5	.643
Missouri	6	–	4	.600	9	–	9	.500
Kansas State	5	–	5	.500	7	–	8	.467
Iowa State	4	–	6	.400	9	–	6	.600
Nebraska	2	–	8	.200	3	–	17	.150

The 1931–32 Iowa State Cyclones men's basketball team represented Iowa State University during the 1931–32 NCAA men's basketball season. The Cyclones were coached by Louis Menze, who was in his fourth season with the Cyclones. They played their home games at the State Gymnasium in Ames, Iowa.

They finished the season 9–6, 4–6 in Big Six play to finish in fifth place.

== Roster ==
1931–32 Iowa State Cyclones men's basketball team
Players
Coaches

Pos.	#	Name	Height	Weight	Year	Hometown
		Roger Bowen	—	—
		Frank Burrell	—	—
		Clark Craghead	—	—	Jr
G		Clyde Dills	—	—	Jr
G		Dick Hawk	—	—	Sr
C		Albert Heitman	—	—	Sr
		Harold Holekvam	—	—	So	Eagle Grove, Iowa
G		Herman Holmes	—	—	Sr	Gilbert, Iowa
G		Frank Hood	—	—		Creston, Iowa
F		Victor Jones	—	—	Jr	Hornick, Iowa
		Wendell King	—	—	Sr
		Isadore Levine	—	—	Jr
F		Adolph Ludwig	—	—	Jr	Lawton, Iowa
G		Glen Meier	—	—	So	Ottumwa, Iowa
		Jack Pohlman	—	—
G		Max Ricke	—	—	Sr
F		Jack Roadcap (C)	—	—	Sr
F		Ronald Sieben	—	—	So	Geneseo, Illinois
		Harold Templeton	—	—		Ocheyedan, Iowa
F		Ralph Thomson	—	—	Jr	Omaha, Nebraska
C	14	Waldo Wegner	—	—	So	Everly, Iowa

Head coach

- Louis Menze

Assistant coach(es)

Legend

- (C) Team captain
- (S) Suspended
- (I) Ineligible
- (W) Walk-on
- Injured
- Current redshirt

== Schedule and results ==
Date time, TV	Rank^{#}	Opponent^{#}	Result	Record	Site city, state
Regular season
December 15, 1931*; 7:15 p.m.		Brigham Young	W 47–25	1–0	State Gymnasium; Ames, Iowa
December 18, 1931*		Central	W 44–32	2–0	State Gymnasium; Ames, Iowa
December 31, 1931*; 8:15 p.m.		at Drake; Iowa Big Four	W 32–30	3–0	Drake Fieldhouse; Des Moines, Iowa
January 8, 1932; 7:30 p.m.		Nebraska	L 24–28	3–1 (0–1)	State Gymnasium; Ames, Iowa
January 16, 1932		at Oklahoma	L 32–37	3–2 (0–2)	OU Field House; Norman, Oklahoma
January 18, 1932		at Kansas	W 37–29	4–2 (1–2)	Hoch Auditorium; Lawrence, Kansas
January 22, 1932		Missouri	W 18–13	5–2 (2–2)	State Gymnasium; Ames, Iowa
January 26, 1932; 7:15 p.m.		Drake; Iowa Big Four	W 35–25	6–2	State Gymnasium; Ames, Iowa
January 30, 1932		at Kansas State	L 15–19	6–3 (2–3)	Nichols Hall; Manhattan, Kansas
February 1, 1932		at Nebraska	W 33–32	7–3 (3–3)	Nebraska Coliseum; Lincoln, Nebraska
February 5, 1932		Kansas	L 27–40	7–4 (3–4)	State Gymnasium; Ames, Iowa
February 8, 1932		Oklahoma	W 29–22	8–4 (4–4)	State Gymnasium; Ames, Iowa
February 13, 1932		at Missouri	L 25–31	8–5 (4–5)	Brewer Fieldhouse; Columbia, Missouri
February 19, 1932; 7:30 p.m.		Kansas State	L 27–30	8–6 (4–6)	State Gymnasium; Ames, Iowa
February 22, 1932*; 8:15 p.m.		at Drake; Iowa Big Four	W 31–19	9–6	Drake Fieldhouse; Des Moines, Iowa
*Non-conference game. ^{#}Rankings from AP poll. (#) Tournament seedings in parentheses. All times are in Central Time.
