= 1936 SEC men's basketball tournament =

- Classification: Division I
- Teams: 9
- Site: Alumni Memorial Gym; Knoxville, Tennessee
- Champions: Tennessee (1st title)
- Winning coach: Blair Gullion (1st title)

1935–36 Southeastern Conference men's basketball standings
| | Conf. | | | | Overall |
| Team | W | | L | PCT | W | | L | PCT |
|---|---|---|---|---|---|---|---|---|
| Kentucky | 6 | – | 2 | .750 | 15 | – | 6 | .714 |
| Vanderbilt | 9 | – | 4 | .692 | 9 | – | 14 | .391 |
| Tennessee † | 8 | – | 4 | .667 | 15 | – | 6 | .714 |
| Mississippi State | 9 | – | 5 | .643 | 11 | – | 6 | .647 |
| Auburn | 7 | – | 4 | .636 | 10 | – | 5 | .667 |
| Alabama | 9 | – | 6 | .600 | 15 | – | 9 | .625 |
| LSU | 9 | – | 6 | .600 | 10 | – | 10 | .500 |
| Georgia Tech | 7 | – | 5 | .583 | 10 | – | 8 | .556 |
| Ole Miss | 7 | – | 5 | .583 | 11 | – | 9 | .550 |
| Georgia | 6 | – | 7 | .462 | 9 | – | 11 | .450 |
| Florida | 2 | – | 8 | .200 | 5 | – | 10 | .333 |
| Tulane | 1 | – | 14 | .067 | 2 | – | 17 | .105 |
| Sewanee | 0 | – | 10 | .000 | 2 | – | 13 | .133 |
† Regular-season championship and SEC Tournament winner

The 1936 Southeastern Conference men's basketball tournament took place on February 28–March 2, 1936, in Knoxville, Tennessee at Alumni Memorial Gym. It was the third SEC basketball tournament.

Tennessee won the tournament by beating Alabama in the championship game.

== Bracket ==
First Round
Auburn | 43
Georgia | 26

Quarterfinals
Georgia Tech | 42
Vanderbilt | 37
Alabama | 52
LSU | 30
Kentucky | 41
Mississippi State | 39
Tennessee | 43
Auburn | 25

Semifinals
Georgia Tech | 34
Alabama | 43
Kentucky | 28
Tennessee | 39

Finals
Alabama | 25
Tennessee | 29
