= Frank Johnson (basketball, born 1911) =

American college athlete, sports coach (1911–1994)

Biographical details
- Born: April 23, 1911; Rockford, Illinois, U.S.
- Died: June 27, 1994 (aged 83); Columbia, South Carolina, U.S.

Playing career

Football
- 1933–1935: Georgia

Basketball
- 1933–1936: Georgia

Baseball
- 1936: Georgia
- Positions: Guard (football); Forward (basketball)

Coaching career (HC unless noted)

Football
- 1936–1937: Georgia (assistant freshmen)
- 1938–1939: Ole Miss (line)
- 1940–?: South Carolina (freshmen)

Basketball
- 1938: Georgia
- 1938–1939: Ole Miss
- 1940–1943: South Carolina
- 1946–1958: South Carolina

Head coaching record
- Overall: 192–196
- Tournaments: 1–1 (SEC); 3–7 (SoCon); 2–5 (ACC)

Accomplishments and honors

Awards
- Football; All-SEC (1935)

Frank W. Johnson Sr. (April 23, 1911 – June 27, 1994) was an American college football and college basketball player and coach. He served as the head basketball coach at University of Georgia for part of the 1937–38 season, the University of Mississippi (Ole Miss) for one season, in 1938–39, and two stints at the University of South Carolina, from 1940 to 1943 and 1946 to 1958. Johnson played football, basketball, and baseball at Georgia, earning all-conference honors in football and twice captaining the Georgia Bulldogs basketball team.

== Early life and playing career ==
A native of Rockford, Illinois, Johnson graduated from Rockford High School in 1930. He attended the University of Georgia, where he starred in football and basketball. He was co-captain of the Georgia Bulldogs basketball team for the 1934–35 and 1935–36 seasons.

== Coaching career ==
In 1936, Johnson was appointed assistant freshman football coach for Georgia. In January 1938, Georgia's athletic board named Elmer A. Lampe of Carroll College in Waukesha, Wisconsin as the school's new head basketball coach and ends coach for the football team. But since Lampe was not scheduled to come to Georgia until February, at which time he would be occupied with spring football training, Johnson was given charge of the 1937–38 Georgia Bulldogs basketball team. Johnson left Georgia on February 20, following Harry Mehre, who had been head coach of Georgia's football team since 1928, to the University of Mississippi (Ole Miss). Lampe then took the reins of the Georgia basketball team.

At Ole Miss, Johnson served as line coach for the football team for two years, and was head basketball coach for one season, in 1938–39. In early 1940, he left Ole Miss to go to the University of South Carolina as head basketball coach and freshman football coach, reuniting with Rex Enright, South Carolina's head football coach who had been Georgia's backfield coach in football and head basketball coach during Johnson's playing days. Johnson's tenure at South Carolina was interrupted by service in the United States Navy during World War II. He stepped down as head coach of the South Carolina Gamecocks men's basketball team in May 1958, but remained at the school as athletic business manager. In 14 full seasons plus parts of two additional seasons as head basketball coach for the Gamecocks, Johnson compiled a record of 174–175. His 174 wins are second only to Frank McGuire's 283 in team history.

== Death ==
Johnson died of pneumonia, on June 27, 1994, at a nursing home in Columbia, South Carolina.

== Head coaching record ==
Record table
| Season | Team | Overall | Conference | Standing | Postseason |
|---|---|---|---|---|---|
Georgia Bulldogs (Southeastern Conference) (1938)
| 1937–38 | Georgia | 8–5 (Note: Georgia had three head coaches during the 1937–38 season. Vernon Smith was head coach for the first two games of the season, in early January. Johnson was head coach for the next 13 games before Elmer A. Lampe took over the team in February. Georgia finished the season 12–10 overall and 4–6 in conference play, placing ninth in the Southeastern Conference (SEC).) | 4–3 | | |
| Georgia: | | 8–5 | 4–3 | | |
Ole Miss Rebels (Southeastern Conference) (1938–1939)
| 1938–39 | Ole Miss | 10–16 | 4–10 | 12th | |
| Ole Miss: | | 10–16 | 4–10 | | |
South Carolina Gamecocks (Southern Conference) (1940–1943)
| 1940–41 | South Carolina | 15–9 | 8–3 | T–2nd | |
| 1941–42 | South Carolina | 12–9 | 8–4 | T–5th | |
| 1942–43 | South Carolina | 2–0 (Note: Johnson coached the first two games of the season, both non-conference contests, before Rex Enright took over the team in early January for the remainder of the year. South Carolina finished the season 13–6 overall with a mark of 6–3 in conference play, placing third in the Southern Conference (SoCon).) | 0–0 | | |
South Carolina Gamecocks (Southern Conference) (1946–1953)
| 1945–46 | South Carolina | 5–3 (Note: Dick Anderson coached the first 12 games of the season, before Johnson took over the team for the remainder of the year. South Carolina finished the season 9–11 overall with a mark of 4–8 in conference play.) | 3–1 | 11th | |
| 1946–47 | South Carolina | 16–9 | 7–5 | 7th | |
| 1947–48 | South Carolina | 12–11 | 8–7 | T–8th | |
| 1948–49 | South Carolina | 10–12 | 7–6 | 6th | |
| 1949–50 | South Carolina | 13–9 | 12–5 | 4th | |
| 1950–51 | South Carolina | 13–12 | 12–7 | 7th | |
| 1951–52 | South Carolina | 14–10 | 8–7 | 9th | |
| 1952–53 | South Carolina | 11–13 | 7–12 | 11th | |
South Carolina Gamecocks (Atlantic Coast Conference) (1953–1958)
| 1953–54 | South Carolina | 10–16 | 2–8 | 6th | |
| 1954–55 | South Carolina | 10–17 | 2–12 | 7th | |
| 1955–56 | South Carolina | 9–14 | 3–11 | T–6th | |
| 1956–57 | South Carolina | 17–12 | 5–9 | 6th | |
| 1957–58 | South Carolina | 5–19 | 3–11 | T–7th | |
| South Carolina: | | 174–175 | 95–108 | | |
| Total: | | 192–196 | | | |
