= Elmer A. Lampe =

American sports coach, athletics administrator (1900–1978)

- Lampe pictured in The Hinakaga 1936, Carroll College yearbook

Biographical details
- Born: December 11, 1900; Eveleth, Minnesota, U.S.
- Died: January 30, 1978 (aged 77); Deerfield Beach, Florida, U.S.

Playing career

Football
- 1922–1925: Chicago

Basketball
- c. 1925: Chicago

Track and field
- c. 1925: Chicago
- Position: End (football)

Coaching career (HC unless noted)

Football
- 1926–1927: Emerson HS (IN)
- 1928–1930: Evanston HS (IL)
- 1931: Wisconsin (ends)
- 1932–1933: Carleton
- 1934–1937: Carroll (WI)
- 1938–1942: Georgia (ends)
- 1946: Georgia (assistant)
- 1946–1960: Dartmouth (ends)
- 1961–1965: Dartmouth (scout / freshmen ends)
- 1968: New Hampshire (assistant)

Basketball
- 1926–1928: Emerson HS (IN)
- 1928–1931: Evanston HS (IL)
- 1934–1938: Carroll (WI)
- 1938–1946: Georgia
- 1946–1950: Dartmouth

Track and field
- 1926–1928: Emerson HS (IN)
- 1928–1938: Evanston HS (IL)
- 1934–1938: Carroll (WI)

Administrative career (AD unless noted)
- 1934–1938: Carroll (WI)

Head coaching record
- Overall: 24–11–7 (college football); 165–154 (college basketball)

Accomplishments and honors

Championships
- Football; 1 MWC (1932)

Awards
- Second-team All-Big Ten (1925)

Elmer Andrew Lampe (December 11, 1900 – January 30, 1978) was an American football, basketball, and track and field coach and athletics administrator. He was the head basketball coach at Carroll College—now known as Carroll University—in Waukesha, Wisconsin from 1934 to 1938, the University of Georgia from 1938 to 1946, and Dartmouth College from 1946 to 1950. Lampe served as the head football coach at Carleton College in Northfield, Minnesota from 1932 to 1933 and Carroll from 1934 to 1937, compiling a career college football head coaching mark of 24–11–7.

== Early life, playing career, and education ==
A native of Eveleth, Minnesota, Lampe attended the University of Chicago, where he was an All-American end in football. He also played on the school's basketball and track and field teams. Lampe graduated from Chicago in 1926 with a Bachelor of Philosophy. Lampe earned as Master of Science degree in physical education from the University of Wisconsin in 1934.

== Coaching career ==
Lampe began his coaching career in 1926, when he succeeded George F. Veenker as athletic coach at Emerson High School in Gary Indiana. He led his football teams at Gary to a record of 13–2–2 in two season before resigning in 1928 to move to Evanston High School in Evanston, Illinois. Lampe left Evanston High School in 1931 to become the ends coach for the football team at the University of Wisconsin, assisting head football coach Glenn Thistlethwaite.

In January 1932, Lampe was hired as head football coach at Carleton College in Northfield, Minnesota. In 1934, Lampe was appointed athletic director and coach at Carroll College—now known as Carroll University—in Waukesha, Wisconsin, succeeding Thistlethwaite. He served as the head football coach at Carroll for four seasons, from 1934 to 1937, leading his teams to a record of 17–7–4.

On January 10, 1938, the University of Georgia's athletic board named Lampe as the school's new head basketball coach and ends coach for the Georgia Bulldogs football team under Joel Hunt, newly hired as head football coach. At that time, Frank Johnson was appointed head coach of the Georgia Bulldogs basketball team, as Lampe was not scheduled to come to Georgia until February, at which time he would be occupied with spring football training. When Johnson left Georgia on February 20, Lampe took charge of the Georgia basketball team. Lampe was head coach of Georgia' basketball team through the 1945–46 season, compiling a record of 82–84 over eight full seasons plus part of the 1937–38 season.

Lampe left Georgia in September 1946 to become the head basketball coach at Dartmouth College. His Dartmouth basketball teams had a record of 45–55 in fourth seasons, from 1946 to 1950. Lampe was succeeded as Dartmouth head basketball coach in 1950 by Doggie Julian, but retained his role as ends coach and head scout for the Dartmouth football team. He remained ends coach though the 1960 season, having served under head football coaches Tuss McLaughry and Bob Blackman. Lampe continued on at Dartmouth as an associate instructor in the physical education department, scout for the varsity football team, and end coach for the freshman football team until his retirement in 1966. He returned to coaching for a year, in 1968, as an assistant football coach at the University of New Hampshire under head football coach Jim Root.

== Later life and death ==
Lampe retired to Deerfield Beach, Florida, and then moved to Boynton Beach, Florida. He died on January 30, 1978, at North Broward Hospital in Deerfield Beach.

== Head coaching record ==
=== College football ===
Year	Team	Overall	Conference	Standing	Bowl/playoffs
Carleton Carls (Midwest Conference) (1932–1933)
1932	Carleton	5–2–1	2–0–1	T–1st	
1933	Carleton	2–2–2	0–2–1	T–6th	
Carleton:		7–4–3	2–2–2		
Carroll Pioneers (Independent) (1934–1937)
1934	Carroll	2–3–2			
1935	Carroll	2–4–1			
1936	Carroll	7–0			
1937	Carroll	6–0–1			
Carroll:		17–7–4			
Total:		24–11–7			
National championship Conference title Conference division title or championship game berth

=== College basketball ===
Record table
Season	Team	Overall	Conference	Standing	Postseason
Carroll Pioneers (Independent) (1934–1938)
1934–35	Carroll	11–4			
1935–36	Carroll	11–5			
1936–37	Carroll	10–5			
1937–38	Carroll	6–1 (Note: Lampe served as Carroll's head basketball coach for the first seven games of the 1937–38 season before leaving for Georgia at the end of January. John W. Breen was appointed head coach for the remainder of the year. Carroll finished the season with an overall record of 14–1.)			
Carroll:		38–15			
Georgia Bulldogs (Southeastern Conference) (1938–1946)
1937–38	Georgia	3–4 (Note: Georgia had three head coaches during the 1937–38 season. Vernon Smith was head coach for the first two games of the season, in early January. Frank Johnson was head coach for the next 13 games before Lampe took over the team in February. Georgia finished the season 12–10 overall and 4–6 in conference play.)	0–3	9th	
1938–39	Georgia	11–6	8–3	2nd	
1939–40	Georgia	20–5	9–4	3rd	
1940–41	Georgia	13–11	6–7	9th	
1941–42	Georgia	7–10	5–8	7th	
1942–43	Georgia	4–13	1–8	10th	
1943–44	Georgia	7–10	0–2	3rd	
1944–45	Georgia	5–16	2–9	T–10th	
1945–46	Georgia	12–9	6–6	6th	
Georgia:		82–84	37–50		
Dartmouth Indians (Eastern Intercollegiate Basketball League) (1946–1950)
1946–47	Dartmouth	10–15	5–7	T–4th	
1947–48	Dartmouth	12–12	6–6	T–3rd	
1948–49	Dartmouth	15–11	4–8	6th	
1949–50	Dartmouth	8–17	1–11	7th	
Dartmouth:		45–55	16–32		
Total:		165–154			

== Works ==
- Elmer A. Lampe, "How to Play Defensive End." Athletic Journal, v. 9, p. 51 (1928).
- Elmer A. Lampe, "Statistics as an Aid to Football Strategy," Scholastic Coach, 21:14, April 1952.
