= 1931–32 UCLA Bruins men's basketball team =

American college basketball season

1931–32 UCLA Bruins men's basketball
- Conference: Pacific Coast Conference
- South
- Record: 9–10 (4–7 PCC)
- Head coach: Caddy Works (11th season)
- Assistant coaches: Silas Gibbs; Wilbur Johns

1931–32 Pacific Coast Conference men's basketball standings
	Conf.				Overall
Team	W		L	PCT	W		L	PCT
North
Washington	12	–	4	.750	19	–	6	.760
Washington State	11	–	5	.688	22	–	5	.815
Oregon State	7	–	9	.438	13	–	11	.542
Oregon	7	–	9	.438	13	–	11	.542
Idaho	2	–	14	.125	8	–	16	.333
South
California †	8	–	3	.727	16	–	8	.667
USC	8	–	3	.727	10	–	12	.455
UCLA	4	–	7	.364	9	–	10	.474
Stanford	2	–	9	.182	6	–	13	.316
† Conference playoff series winner

The 1931–32 UCLA Bruins men's basketball team represented the University of California, Los Angeles during the 1931–32 NCAA men's basketball season and were members of the Pacific Coast Conference. The Bruins were led by eleventh year head coach Caddy Works. They finished the regular season with a record of 9–10 and were third in the southern division with a record of 4–7.

== Previous season ==
The Bruins finished the regular season with a record of 9–6 and were third in the southern division with a record of 4–5.

== Roster ==
1931–32 UCLA Bruins men's basketball team
Players
Coaches

Pos.	#	Name	Height	Weight	Year	Hometown
		Joe Berry	—	—
		Carson Binkley	—	—	Jr
G	33	George Brotemarkle	—	—
G	31	Ted Lemcke	—	—
F	26	Dick Linthicum (C)	—	—
	27	Bill Maxwell	—	—
F	29	Donald Piper	—	—	So
	40	Lou Rose	—	—	So
	23	Jimmy Soest	—	—
		Len Wellendorf	—	—

Head coach

Caddy Works

Assistant coach(es)

- Wilbur Johns (UCLA)
- Silas Gibbs (UCLA)

Legend

- (C) Team captain
- (S) Suspended
- (I) Ineligible
- (W) Walk-on
- Injured
- Current redshirt

Roster
Last update: 30 January 2018

== Schedule ==
Date time, TV	Rank^{#}	Opponent^{#}	Result	Record	Site city, state
Regular Season
*		Hollywood Athletic Club	W 35–20	1–0	Physical Education Building; Los Angeles, CA
*		Whittier	W 38–21	2–0	Physical Education Building; Los Angeles, CA
*		Whittier	W 48–23	3–0	Physical Education Building; Los Angeles, CA
*		Pasadena Major	L 24–34	3–1	Physical Education Building; Los Angeles, CA
*		Utah State	L 27–39	3–2	Physical Education Building; Los Angeles, CA
*		Utah State	L 20–33	3–3	Physical Education Building; Los Angeles, CA
*		Utah State	W 30–21	4–3	Physical Education Building; Los Angeles, CA
*		Los Angeles Athletic Club	W 30–25	5–3	Physical Education Building; Los Angeles, CA
		at Stanford	L 22–25	5–4 (0–1)	Stanford Pavilion; Stanford, CA
		at Stanford	L 26–31	5–5 (0–2)	Stanford Pavilion; Stanford, CA
		California	L 18–29	5–6 (0–3)	Physical Education Building; Los Angeles, CA
		California	L 25–26	5–7 (0–4)	Physical Education Building; Los Angeles, CA
		USC	W 19–17	6–7 (1–4)	Physical Education Building; Los Angeles, CA
		Stanford	W 35–31	7–7 (2–4)	Physical Education Building; Los Angeles, CA
		Stanford	W 28–18	8–7 (3–4)	Physical Education Building; Los Angeles, CA
		at California	L 28–34	8–8 (3–5)	Harmon Gym; Berkeley, CA
		at California	L 29–31	8–9 (3–6)	Harmon Gym; Berkeley, CA
		at USC	W 26–24	9–9 (4–6)	Shrine Auditorium; Los Angeles, CA
		at USC	L 31–35	9–10 (4–7)	Shrine Auditorium; Los Angeles, CA
*Non-conference game. ^{#}Rankings from AP Poll. (#) Tournament seedings in parentheses. All times are in Pacific Time.

== Awards and honors ==
- Dick Linthicum, second-team All-American – College Humor
