= 1935–36 Georgia Bulldogs basketball team =

American college basketball season

1935–36 Georgia Bulldogs basketball
- Conference: Southeastern Conference
- Record: 9–11 (6–7 SEC)
- Head coach: Rex Enright (5th season)
- Captains: Frank Johnson; Harrison Anderson
- Home arena: Woodruff Hall

1935–36 Southeastern Conference men's basketball standings
	Conf.				Overall
Team	W		L	PCT	W		L	PCT
Kentucky	6	–	2	.750	15	–	6	.714
Vanderbilt	9	–	4	.692	9	–	14	.391
Tennessee †	8	–	4	.667	15	–	6	.714
Mississippi State	9	–	5	.643	11	–	6	.647
Auburn	7	–	4	.636	10	–	5	.667
Alabama	9	–	6	.600	15	–	9	.625
LSU	9	–	6	.600	10	–	10	.500
Georgia Tech	7	–	5	.583	10	–	8	.556
Ole Miss	7	–	5	.583	11	–	9	.550
Georgia	6	–	7	.462	9	–	11	.450
Florida	2	–	8	.200	5	–	10	.333
Tulane	1	–	14	.067	2	–	17	.105
Sewanee	0	–	10	.000	2	–	13	.133
† Regular-season championship and SEC Tournament winner

The 1935–36 Georgia Bulldogs basketball team represented the University of Georgia as a member of the Southeastern Conference (SEC) during the 1935–36 NCAA men's basketball season. Led by fifth-year head coach Rex Enright, the Bulldogs compiled an overall record of 9–11 with a mark of 6–7 in conference play, placing tenth in the SEC. The team captains were Frank Johnson and Harrison Anderson.

== Schedule ==
Date time, TV	Opponent	Result	Record	Site city, state
12/20/1935	at Tulane	W 34-26	1–0	
12/21/1935	at Tulane	L 26-34	1–1	
12/23/1935	at LSU	L 34-46	1–2	
1/3/1936	Chattanooga	W 33-23	2–2	Athens, GA
1/5/1936	Chattanooga	L 27-38	2–3	Athens, GA
1/10/1936	at Chattanooga	W 38-28	3–3	
1/11/1936	at Tennessee	L 44-56	3–4	
1/16/1936	at Stetson	L 21-35	3–5	
1/17/1936	at Florida	W 37-28	4–5	
1/18/1936	at Florida	W 43-32	5–5	
1/31/1936	Tennessee	W 30-24	6–5	Athens, GA
2/1/1936	at Georgia Tech	L 21-29	6–6	
2/7/1936	Florida	W 40-32	7–6	Athens, GA
2/8/1936	Florida	W 27-22	8–6	Athens, GA
2/12/1936	Clemson	W 33-13	9–6	Athens, GA
2/15/1936	at Auburn	L 26-33	9–7	
2/17/1936	at Alabama	L 28-42	9–8	
2/19/1936	at Clemson	L 24-27	9–9	
2/22/1936	Georgia Tech	L 22-24	9–10	Athens, GA
2/28/1936	Auburn	L 26-43	9–11	Athens, GA
*Non-conference game. (#) Tournament seedings in parentheses.
