= 1931–32 Kansas Jayhawks men's basketball team =

American college basketball season

1931–32 Kansas Jayhawks men's basketball

Big Six Champions
- Conference: Big Six Conference
- Record: 13–5 (7–3 Big 6)
- Head coach: Phog Allen (15th season)
- Captains: Theodore O'Leary; Leland Page
- Home arena: Hoch Auditorium

1931–32 Big Six Conference men's basketball standings
| | Conf. | | | | Overall |
| Team | W | | L | PCT | W | | L | PCT |
|---|---|---|---|---|---|---|---|---|
| Kansas | 7 | – | 3 | .700 | 13 | – | 5 | .722 |
| Oklahoma | 6 | – | 4 | .600 | 9 | – | 5 | .643 |
| Missouri | 6 | – | 4 | .600 | 9 | – | 9 | .500 |
| Kansas State | 5 | – | 5 | .500 | 7 | – | 8 | .467 |
| Iowa State | 4 | – | 6 | .400 | 9 | – | 6 | .600 |
| Nebraska | 2 | – | 8 | .200 | 3 | – | 17 | .150 |

The 1931–32 Kansas Jayhawks men's basketball team represented the University of Kansas during the 1931–32 college men's basketball season.

== Roster ==
- Paul Randall Harrington
- William Johnson
- Theodore O'Leary
- Leland Page
- Elmer Schaake
- Ernest Vanek

== Schedule ==
| Date time, TV | Rank^{#} | Opponent^{#} | Result | Record | Site city, state |
|---|---|---|---|---|---|
| December 11* | | Kansas State; Sunflower Showdown | W 32–30 | 1-0 | Hoch Auditorium; Lawrence, KS |
| December 16* | | at Kansas State; Sunflower Showdown | W 27–25 | 2-0 | Nichols Hall; Manhattan, KS |
| December 21* | | vs. Pittsburgh | W 24–23 | 3-0 | Convention Hall; Kansas City, MO |
| December 22* | | vs. Pittsburgh | W 26–20 | 4-0 | Convention Hall; Kansas City, MO |
| December 23* | | vs. Pittsburgh | L 22–25 | 4-1 | Convention Hall; Kansas City, MO |
| January 4* | | Colorado | L 22–25 | 5-2 | Convention Hall; Kansas City, MO |
| January 5* | | vs. Colorado | W 41–22 | 6-2 | Convention Hall; Kansas City, MO |
| January 6* | | Colorado | W 34–25 | 7-2 | Hoch Auditorium; Lawrence, KS |
| January 9 | | at Oklahoma | L 26–31 | 7-3 (0-1) | Field House; Norman, OK |
| January 12 | | at Nebraska | W 34–21 | 8-3 (1-1) | Nebraska Coliseum; Lincoln, NE |
| January 15 | | Kansas State; Sunflower Showdown | W 27–26 | 9-3 (2-1) | Hoch Auditorium; Lawrence, KS |
| January 18 | | Iowa State | L 29–37 | 9-4 (2-2) | Hoch Auditorium; Lawrence, KS |
| January 30 | | at Missouri; Border War | L 22–26 | 9-5 (2-3) | Brewer Fieldhouse; Columbia, MO |
| February 5 | | at Iowa State | W 40–27 | 10-5 (3-3) | State Gymnasium; Ames, IA |
| February 12 | | at Kansas State; Sunflower Showdown | W 30–22 | 11-5 (4-3) | Nichols Hall; Manhattan, KS |
| February 15 | | Nebraska | W 51–19 | 12-5 (5-3) | Hoch Auditorium; Lawrence, KS |
| February 20 | | Missouri; Border War | W 24–16 | 13-5 (6-3) | Hoch Auditorium; Lawrence, KS |
| February 27 | | Oklahoma | W 33–29 | 14-5 (7-3) | Hoch Auditorium; Lawrence, KS |
*Non-conference game. ^{#}Rankings from AP Poll. (#) Tournament seedings in parentheses.

Per the January 4, 1932 Lawrence Daily Journal World the first two Kansas State College games were not part of the Big 6 Conference schedule, so they are not counted as conference games.
