= 1934–35 Georgia Bulldogs basketball team =

American college basketball season

1934–35 Georgia Bulldogs basketball
- Conference: Southeastern Conference
- Record: 12–8 (4–5 SEC)
- Head coach: Rex Enright (4th season)
- Captains: Frank Johnson; Harrison Anderson
- Home arena: Woodruff Hall

1934–35 Southeastern Conference men's basketball standings
	Conf.				Overall
Team	W		L	PCT	W		L	PCT
LSU †	12	–	0	1.000	14	–	1	.933
Kentucky †	11	–	0	1.000	19	–	2	.905
Tennessee	7	–	4	.636	11	–	5	.688
Vanderbilt	9	–	6	.600	9	–	11	.450
Florida	4	–	3	.571	8	–	7	.533
Alabama	8	–	7	.533	9	–	8	.529
Mississippi State	5	–	5	.500	12	–	6	.667
Georgia Tech	5	–	6	.455	6	–	8	.429
Georgia	4	–	5	.444	12	–	8	.600
Ole Miss	5	–	7	.417	8	–	10	.444
Auburn	3	–	9	.250	4	–	13	.235
Sewanee	1	–	7	.125	2	–	12	.143
Tulane	1	–	16	.059	1	–	16	.059
† Conference co-championship winner

The 1934–35 Georgia Bulldogs basketball team represented the University of Georgia as a member of the Southeastern Conference (SEC) during the 1934–35 NCAA men's basketball season. Led by fourth-year head coach Rex Enright, the Bulldogs compiled an overall record of 12–8 with a mark of 4–5 in conference play, placing ninth in the SEC. The team captains were Frank Johnson and Harrison Anderson.

== Schedule ==
Date time, TV	Opponent	Result	Record	Site city, state
12/21/1934	Oglethorpe	W 54-30	1–0	Athens, GA
12/22/1934	Oglethorpe	W 43-34	2–0	Athens, GA
1/4/1935	Chattanooga	W 32-27	3–0	Athens, GA
1/5/1935	Chattanooga	W 28-26	4–0	Athens, GA
1/10/1935	Florida	L 27-29	4–1	Athens, GA
1/11/1935	Florida	W 34-30	5–1	Athens, GA
1/16/1935	Presbyterian	W 45-25	6–1	Athens, GA
1/19/1935	Georgia Tech	W 33-23	7–1	Athens, GA
1/26/1935	Clemson	L 20-31	7–2	Athens, GA
2/2/1935	at Georgia Tech	L 27-32	7–3	
2/5/1935	Auburn	W 33-29	8–3	Athens, GA
2/8/1935	at Presbyterian	W 38-34	9–3	
2/9/1935	at Clemson	W 44-43	10–3	
2/12/1935	Mercer	W 48-20	11–3	Athens, GA
2/14/1935	at Stetson	L 27-31	11–4	
2/15/1935	at Florida	L 25-29	11–5	
2/16/1935	at Florida	L 45-47	11–6	
2/20/1935	Alabama	W 26-21	12–6	Athens, GA
2/23/1935	Georgia Tech	L 39-49	12–7	Athens, GA
2/28/1935	South Georgia Teachers	L 24-30	12–8	Athens, GA
*Non-conference game. (#) Tournament seedings in parentheses.
