= 1931–32 La Salle Explorers men's basketball team =

American college basketball season

1931–32 La Salle Explorers men's basketball
- Conference: Independent
- Record: 15–8
- Head coach: Thomas Conley (1st season)
- Captain: Charles Mosicant
- Home arena: Wister Hall

The 1931–32 La Salle Explorers men's basketball team represented La Salle University during the 1931–32 NCAA men's basketball season. The head coach was Thomas Conley, coaching the explorers in his first season. The team finished with an overall record of 15–8.

== Schedule ==
Date time, TV	Opponent	Result	Record	Site city, state
Dec 3, 1931*	Alumni	W 39–11	1–0	Wister Hall; Philadelphia, PA
Dec 12, 1931*	at Delaware	L 25–33	1–1	Newark, DE
Dec 16, 1931*	Temple Pharmacy	W 35–11	2–1	Wister Hall; Philadelphia, PA
Dec 18, 1931*	West Chester	W 38–20	3–1	Wister Hall; Philadelphia, PA
Dec 19, 1931*	at Seton Hall	L 28–34	3–2	South Orange, NJ
Jan 5, 1932*	Philadelphia Textile	W 31–10	4–2	Wister Hall; Philadelphia, PA
Jan 8, 1932*	at Mount St. Mary's	L 27–33	4–3	Emmitsburg, MD
Jan 14 1932*	Ursinus	W 29–26	5–3	Wister Hall; Philadelphia, PA
Jan 17, 1932*	Susquehanna	W 17–11	6–3	Wister Hall; Philadelphia, PA
Jan 22, 1932*	Elizabethtown	W 46–14	7–3	Wister Hall; Philadelphia, PA
Jan 23, 1932*	at Temple Pharmacy	W 33–17	8–3	
Jan. 30, 1932*	Gallaudet	L 17–23	8–4	Wister Hall; Philadelphia, PA
Feb. 3, 1932*	at Penn A.C.	W 38–37	9–4	Philadelphia, PA
Feb. 6, 1932*	at Princeton	L 24–25	9–5	University Gymnasium; Princeton, NJ
Feb. 9, 1932*	Seton Hall	W 34–24	10–5	Wister Hall; Philadelphia, PA
Feb. 12, 1932*	at Elizabethtown	W 42–29	11–5	Elizabethtown, PA
Feb. 17, 1932*	Lutheran Seminary	W 50–24	12–5	Wister Hall; Philadelphia, PA
Feb. 20, 1932*	Mount St. Mary's	L 24–32	12–6	Wister Hall; Philadelphia, PA
Feb. 22, 1932*	Manhattan	W 34–32	13–6	Philadelphia, PA
Feb. 24, 1932*	at West Chester	L 15–18	13–7	West Chester, PA
Feb. 27, 1932*	at Susquehanna	W 39–29	14–7	Selinsgrove, PA
Mar. 2, 1932*	Penn. Optometry	W 36–18	14–7	Wister Hall; Philadelphia, PA
Mar. 4, 1932*	at Scranton	L 16–33	15–8	Scranton, PA
*Non-conference game. (#) Tournament seedings in parentheses.
