= 1931–32 Buffalo Bulls men's basketball team =

American college basketball season

1931–32 Buffalo Bulls men's basketball
- Conference: Independent
- Record: 15–4
- Head coach: Art Powell (17th season)

The 1931–32 Buffalo Bulls men's basketball team represented the University of Buffalo during the 1931–32 NCAA college men's basketball season. The head coach was Art Powell, coaching his seventeenth season with the Bulls.

== Schedule ==
Date time, TV	Opponent	Result	Record	Site city, state
	Buffalo State	W 48–21	1–0	Buffalo, NY
	Toronto	W 52–23	2–0	Buffalo, NY
	at Hobart	W 43–22	3–0	Geneva, NY
	Yale	L 21–36	3–1	Buffalo, NY
	at Cornell	W 29–23	4–1	Hamilton, NY
	at Lehigh	L 24–31	4–2	Canton, NY
	at Carnegie Tech	L 30–49	4–3	Buffalo, NY
	at Clarkson	W 31–20	5–3	
	at St. Lawrence	W 31–29	6–3	Canton, NY
	Niagara	W 40–24	7–3	Buffalo, NY
	St. Lawrence	W 24–21	8–3	Buffalo, NY
	Williams	W 38–32	9–3	Buffalo, NY
	at Hobart	W 30–23	10–3	Buffalo, NY
	at Rochester	W 36–28	11–3	Rochester, NY
	Clarkson	W 36–30	12–3	Buffalo, NY
	Hamilton	W 52–24	13–3	Buffalo, NY
	Niagara	L 42–46	13–4	Lewiston, NY
	Alfred	W 45–33	14–4	Buffalo, NY
	Rochester	W 36–24	15–4	Buffalo, NY
*Non-conference game. (#) Tournament seedings in parentheses.
