= 1931–32 Illinois Fighting Illini men's basketball team =

American college basketball season

1931–32 Illinois Fighting Illini men's basketball
- Conference: Big Ten Conference
- Record: 11–6 (7–5 Big Ten)
- Head coach: J. Craig Ruby (10th season)
- Assistant coaches: John P. Sabo (4th season); Jerome J. Jordan (1st season)
- Captain: Elbert Kamp
- Home arena: Huff Hall

1931–32 Big Ten Conference men's basketball standings
	Conf.				Overall
Team	W		L	PCT	W		L	PCT
Purdue	11	–	1	.917	17	–	1	.944
Minnesota	9	–	3	.750	15	–	3	.833
Northwestern	9	–	3	.750	13	–	5	.722
Michigan	8	–	4	.667	11	–	6	.647
Illinois	7	–	5	.583	11	–	6	.647
Ohio State	5	–	7	.417	9	–	9	.500
Indiana	4	–	8	.333	8	–	10	.444
Wisconsin	3	–	9	.250	8	–	10	.444
Iowa	3	–	9	.250	5	–	12	.294
Chicago	1	–	11	.083	2	–	15	.118

The 1931–32 Illinois Fighting Illini men's basketball team represented the University of Illinois.

== Regular season ==
The 1931–32 season was head coach Craig Ruby's 10th at the University of Illinois. Ruby had 8 returning lettermen from a team that had finished in fourth place in the Big Ten the year before. The team went through a nearly perfect non-conference season, losing only 1 game, however, the Fighting Illini showed no improvement in conference play by finishing with a record of 7 wins and 5 losses. The team finished the season with an overall record of 11 wins 6 losses. The starting lineup included captain Elbert Kamp and Boyd Owen at guard, Robert Kamp and Robert Bartholomew as forwards and Caslon Bennett at center.

=== Roster ===
1931–32 Illinois Fighting Illini men's basketball team
Players
Coaches

Pos.	#	Name	Height	Weight	Year	Hometown
F	4	Hudson Hellmich	—	—	So	Webster Groves, Missouri
F	5	Elbert Kamp (C)	—	—	Sr	Mt. Carmel, Illinois
G	6	Robert Kamp	—	—	Sr	Mt. Carmel, Illinois
F	7	Coslon Bennett	—	—	Jr	Marshall, Illinois
G	8	Boyd Owen	—	—	Jr	South Bend, Indiana
F	9	Robert Y. Bartholomew	—	—	Sr	Peoria, Illinois
C	10	Sidney Port	—	—	So	Chicago, Illinois
F	12	Salway "Fibby" Fierberg	—	—	So	Benton, Illinois
C	14	Vernon Moore	—	—	Jr	Martinsville, Illinois
G	15	Norval Hodges	—	—	So	Flora, Illinois
G	17	George S. Fencl	—	—	Sr	Cicero, Illinois
C	18	Alfred J. Kamm	—	—	So	Lakewood, Washington
G	19	Albert C. Kamm	—	—	So	Lakewood, Washington
G	22	William Theobald	—	—	Jr	Du Quoin, Illinois
F	23	Fred Fencl	—	—	So	Cicero, Illinois
F	24	Paul Carson	—	—	So	Fairbury, Illinois
G	26	John William Lehwald	—	—	So	Chicago, Illinois
F	28	Thomas Myers Plunk	—	—	Jr	Mansfield, Illinois

Head coach

- Craig Ruby (University of Missouri) (10th year)

Assistant coach(es)

- John Sabo (University of Illinois) (4th year)
- Jerome J. Jordan (University of Illinois) (1st year)

Legend

- (C) Team captain
- (S) Suspended
- (I) Ineligible
- (W) Walk-on
- Injured
- Current redshirt

Roster

== Schedule ==
Date time, TV	Rank^{#}	Opponent^{#}	Result	Record	Site (attendance) city, state
Non-Conference regular season
12/12/1931*		St. Louis University	W 31–17	1–0	Huff Hall (5,000); Champaign, IL
12/18/1931*		at Miami (OH)	W 35–19	2–0	Withrow Court (3,500); Oxford, Ohio
12/20/1931*		Butler	L 17–22	2–1	Huff Hall (5,000); Champaign, IL
1/1/1932*		Cornell	W 44–23	3–1	Huff Hall (4,000); Champaign, IL
Big Ten regular season
1/4/1932		Ohio State	L 28–29	3–2 (0–1)	Huff Hall (6,500); Champaign, IL
1/9/1932		Purdue	W 28–21	4–2 (1–1)	Huff Hall (7,000); Champaign, IL
1/11/1932		at Indiana; Rivalry	W 30–22	5–2 (2–1)	IU Field House (5,000); Bloomington, IN
1/18/1932		at Michigan	L 16–28	5–3 (2–2)	Yost Field House (5,000); Ann Arbor, MI
1/23/1932		University of Chicago	W 30–20	6–3 (3–2)	Huff Hall (6,000); Champaign, IL
2/9/1932*		Bradley	W 28–17	7–3 (3–2)	Huff Hall (6,000); Champaign, IL
2/13/1932		at Ohio State	L 26–29	7–4 (3–3)	Ohio Expo Center Coliseum (5,000); Columbus, OH
2/15/1932		Minnesota	W 23–15	8–4 (4–3)	Huff Hall (6,000); Champaign, IL
2/20/1932		Michigan	W 29–23	9–4 (5–3)	Huff Hall (6,500); Champaign, IL
2/27/1932		at Minnesota	L 26–27	9–5 (5–4)	Williams Arena (5,000); Minneapolis, MN
2/29/1932		at Purdue	L 19–34	9–6 (5–5)	Memorial Gymnasium (–); West Lafayette, IN
3/5/1932		at University of Chicago	W 41–20	10–6 (6–5)	Henry Crown Field House (–); Chicago, IL
3/7/1932		Indiana; Rivalry	W 33–32	11–6 (7–5)	Huff Hall (5,000); Champaign, IL
*Non-conference game. ^{#}Rankings from AP Poll. (#) Tournament seedings in parentheses. All times are in Central Time.
