= 1931–32 Washington Huskies men's basketball team =

American college basketball season

1931–32 Washington Huskies men's basketball

PCC Northern Division Champions
- Conference: Pacific Coast Conference
- Record: 19–6 (12–4 PCC)
- Head coach: Hec Edmundson (12th season)
- Captain: Ralph Cairney
- Home arena: UW Pavilion

1931–32 Pacific Coast Conference men's basketball standings
	Conf.				Overall
Team	W		L	PCT	W		L	PCT
North
Washington	12	–	4	.750	19	–	6	.760
Washington State	11	–	5	.688	22	–	5	.815
Oregon State	7	–	9	.438	13	–	11	.542
Oregon	7	–	9	.438	13	–	11	.542
Idaho	2	–	14	.125	8	–	16	.333
South
California †	8	–	3	.727	16	–	8	.667
USC	8	–	3	.727	10	–	12	.455
UCLA	4	–	7	.364	9	–	10	.474
Stanford	2	–	9	.182	6	–	13	.316
† Conference playoff series winner

The 1931–32 Washington Huskies men's basketball team represented the University of Washington for the 1931–32 NCAA college basketball season. Led by twelfth-year head coach Hec Edmundson, the Huskies were members of the Pacific Coast Conference and played their home games on campus at the UW Pavilion in Seattle, Washington.

The Huskies were 19–4 overall in the regular season and 12–4 in conference play; first in the Northern division for a fifth consecutive year. A game behind rival Washington State with two games to play, UW defeated the Cougars twice in Seattle to end the season on a thirteen-game winning streak, eleven in conference.

Washington traveled to Oakland for the PCC championship series against California, the winner of the Southern division after a playoff win over USC. The matchup was a repeat of the previous year's series, won by the Huskies in three games in Seattle. This year, the Golden Bears hosted and won both games to take the conference crown.

The National Invitation Tournament (NIT) debuted in 1938, and the NCAA Tournament in 1939.

== Postseason results ==
Date time, TV	Opponent	Result	Record	Site (attendance) city, state
Pacific Coast Conference Playoff Series
Fri, March 4	vs. California; Game One	L 21–22	19–5	Civic Auditorium; Oakland, California
Sat, March 5	vs. California; Game Two	L 24–36	19–6	Civic Auditorium (7,000); Oakland, California
*Non-conference game. (#) Tournament seedings in parentheses. All times are in Pacific time.
