= 1931–32 Purdue Boilermakers men's basketball team =

American college basketball season

1931–32 Purdue Boilermakers men's basketball

Big Ten Conference Champions Helms Foundation National Champions
- Conference: Big Ten Conference
- Record: 17–1 (11–1 Big Ten)
- Head coach: Ward Lambert (15th season)
- MVP: John Wooden
- Captains: John Wooden; Harry Kellar
- Home arena: Memorial Gymnasium

1931–32 Big Ten Conference men's basketball standings
	Conf.				Overall
Team	W		L	PCT	W		L	PCT
Purdue	11	–	1	.917	17	–	1	.944
Minnesota	9	–	3	.750	15	–	3	.833
Northwestern	9	–	3	.750	13	–	5	.722
Michigan	8	–	4	.667	11	–	6	.647
Illinois	7	–	5	.583	11	–	6	.647
Ohio State	5	–	7	.417	9	–	9	.500
Indiana	4	–	8	.333	8	–	10	.444
Wisconsin	3	–	9	.250	8	–	10	.444
Iowa	3	–	9	.250	5	–	12	.294
Chicago	1	–	11	.083	2	–	15	.118

The 1931–32 Purdue Boilermakers men's basketball team represented Purdue University during the 1931–32 NCAA men's basketball season in the United States. The head coach was Ward Lambert, coaching in his 15th season with the Boilermakers. The team finished the season with a 17–1 record and was the champion of the Big Ten. The team was retroactively named the national champion by the Helms Athletic Foundation and was retroactively listed as the top team of the season by the Premo-Porretta Power Poll.

Future Basketball Hall of Famer as both a player and a coach, John Wooden, was a senior on this team. He was named the national player of the year after leading the successful Boilermakers with an impressive 12.1 points per game average (back when scoring was much lower than it is today, 12 points was a significant average).

The team also contained several future coaches; Eddy in the Indiana High School ranks before returning to Purdue; Fehring in the California collegiate ranks and Moore in the nascent pro ranks.

== Lineup ==
- Earl Campbell – Guard – Indianapolis, IN
- Robert Dornte – Forward – Ft. Wayne, IN
- Ray Eddy – Forward – Columbus, IN
- William "Dutch" Fehring – Center – Columbus, IN
- Louis Harmon – Guard – Gary, IN
- Byron Huggins – Guard – Hartford City, IN
- John Husar – Guard – Chicago, IL
- Harry Kellar – Forward – Chicago, IL
- Emmett Lowery Jr. – Guard – Indianapolis, IN
- Max McLean – Forward – Lafayette, IN
- Norman Miner – Center – Fort Wayne, IN
- Doxie Moore – Forward/Guard – Delphi, IN
- Ralph Parmenter – Guard – Indianapolis, IN
- John Porter – Forward – Logansport, IN
- Lawrence Ridge – Forward – Connersville, IN
- Charles Stewart – Center – Attica, IN
- Joseph Wheeler – Forward – Terre Haute, IN
- John Wooden – Guard – Martinsville, IN
- C.E. Conrad – Student manager

== Schedule and results ==
Date time, TV	Rank^{#}	Opponent^{#}	Result	Record	Site city, state
Regular season
12/12/1931*		at Washington University	W 52–23	1–0	Francis Gymnasium; St. Louis, Missouri
12/15/1931*		at Notre Dame	W 32–24	2–0	Notre Dame Fieldhouse; South Bend, Indiana
12/18/1931*		Pittsburgh	W 41–23	3–0	Memorial Gymnasium; West Lafayette, Indiana
12/29/1931*		Montana State	W 51–21	4–0	Memorial Gymnasium; West Lafayette, Indiana
12/31/1931*		Monmouth (IL)	W 51–26	5–0	Memorial Gymnasium; West Lafayette, Indiana
1/4/1932		Indiana	W 49–30	6–0 (1–0)	Memorial Gymnasium; West Lafayette, Indiana
1/9/1932		at Illinois	L 21–28	6–1 (1–1)	Huff Hall; Champaign, Illinois
1/11/1932		Wisconsin	W 38–22	7–1 (2–1)	Memorial Gymnasium; West Lafayette, Indiana
2/3/1932*		Marquette	W 26–23	8–1	Memorial Gymnasium; West Lafayette, Indiana
2/8/1932		at Ohio State	W 38–33	9–1 (3–1)	Ohio Expo Center Coliseum; Columbus, Ohio
2/13/1932		at Chicago	W 40–27	10–1 (4–1)	Chicago
2/15/1932		Ohio State	W 43–26	11–1 (5–1)	Memorial Gymnasium; West Lafayette, Indiana
2/20/1932		Northwestern	W 48–33	12–1 (6–1)	Memorial Gymnasium; West Lafayette, Indiana
2/22/1932		at Indiana	W 42–29	13–1 (7–1)	The Fieldhouse; Bloomington, Indiana
2/27/1932		at Wisconsin	W 28–21	14–1 (8–1)	UW Fieldhouse; Madison, Wisconsin
2/29/1932		Illinois	W 34–19	15–1 (9–1)	Memorial Gymnasium; West Lafayette, Indiana
3/5/1932		at Northwestern	W 31–17	16–1 (10–1)	Old Patten Gymnasium; Evanston, Illinois
3/7/1932		Chicago	W 53–18	17–1 (11–1)	Memorial Gymnasium; West Lafayette, Indiana
*Non-conference game. ^{#}Rankings from AP Poll. (#) Tournament seedings in parentheses.
