= 1932 Southern Conference men's basketball tournament =

- Classification: Division I
- Teams: 16
- Site: Municipal Auditorium; Atlanta, GA
- Champions: Georgia (1st title)
- Winning coach: Rex Enright (1st title)

1931–32 Southern Conference men's basketball standings
	Conf.				Overall
Team	W		L	PCT	W		L	PCT
Kentucky	9	–	1	.900	15	–	2	.882
Maryland	9	–	1	.900	16	–	4	.800
Auburn	9	–	2	.818	12	–	3	.800
Alabama	11	–	3	.786	16	–	4	.800
North Carolina	6	–	3	.667	16	–	5	.762
Virginia	6	–	3	.667	13	–	8	.619
Georgia †	7	–	4	.636	19	–	7	.731
Ole Miss	8	–	5	.615	9	–	6	.600
Georgia Tech	5	–	3	.625	7	–	6	.538
NC State	6	–	4	.600	10	–	6	.625
Duke	6	–	5	.545	14	–	11	.560
LSU	8	–	8	.500	11	–	9	.550
Tennessee	5	–	5	.500	8	–	7	.533
South Carolina	2	–	2	.500	9	–	7	.563
Vanderbilt	5	–	7	.417	8	–	11	.421
Mississippi A&M	4	–	7	.364	5	–	10	.333
Tulane	5	–	9	.357	6	–	10	.375
Florida	4	–	10	.286	8	–	12	.400
Washington and Lee	3	–	8	.273	9	–	10	.474
Virginia Tech	2	–	8	.200	8	–	9	.471
Clemson	2	–	9	.182	8	–	12	.400
Sewanee	1	–	7	.125	3	–	9	.250
VMI	0	–	9	.000	0	–	14	.000
† Southern Conference Tournament winner

The 1932 Southern Conference men's basketball tournament took place from February 26–27, 1932 and February 29–March 1, 1932 at Municipal Auditorium in Atlanta, Georgia. The Georgia Bulldogs won their first Southern Conference title, led by head coach Rex Enright.

== Format ==
The top sixteen finishers of the conference's twenty-three members were eligible for the tournament. Mississippi and South Carolina did not participate. The tournament was seeded so that no team would face a school that they had faced in the regular season in the first round of the tournament.

== Bracket ==
First round February 26
Maryland	24
Florida	39
Duke	44
Vanderbilt	32
Georgia	48
Mississippi State	26
Virginia	20
Alabama	16
Auburn	34
NC State	33
LSU	36
Georgia Tech	33
North Carolina	35
Tennessee	25
Kentucky	50
Tulane	30

Quarterfinals; February 27
Florida	22
Duke	33
Georgia	40
Virginia	19
Auburn	30
LSU	22
North Carolina	43
Kentucky	42

Semifinals; February 29
Duke	32
Georgia	43
Auburn	31
North Carolina	52

Finals; March 1
Georgia	26
North Carolina	24

* Overtime game

- Games were not played on Sunday to observe the Sabbath.

=== Championship ===
March 1
8:30 PM CST

Georgia 26, North Carolina 24
Pts: Leroy Young 10	Pts: Wilmer Hines 11

Municipal Auditorium, Atlanta, Georgia
Attendance: 4,000

== All-Southern tournament team ==
Player	Position	Class	Team
Tom Alexander	G	Junior	North Carolina
T. W. Lumpkin	G	Senior	Auburn
Leroy Young	F	Senior	Georgia
Virgil Weathers	F	Senior	North Carolina
Bill Strickland	C	Junior	Georgia

== See also ==
- List of Southern Conference men's basketball champions
