= 1931–32 Princeton Tigers men's basketball team =

American college basketball season

1931–32 Princeton Tigers men's basketball
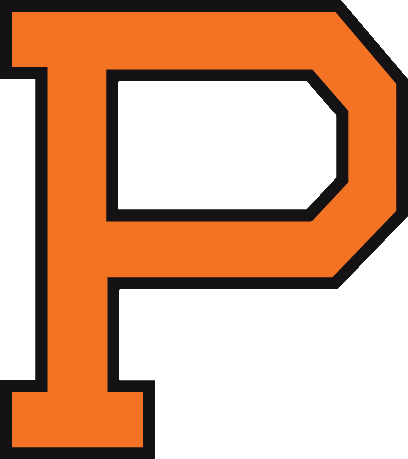

EIBL Champions

EIBL One-game playoff, Won
- Conference: Eastern Intercollegiate Basketball League
- Record: 18–4 (9–2, 1st EIBL)
- Head coach: Albert Wittmer
- Captain: Lloyd Rosenbaum
- Home arena: University Gymnasium

The 1931–32 Princeton Tigers men's basketball team represented Princeton University in intercollegiate college basketball during the 1931–32 NCAA men's basketball season. The head coach was Albert Wittmer and the team captain was Lloyd Rosenbaum. The team played its home games in the University Gymnasium on the university campus in Princeton, New Jersey. The team was the winner of the Eastern Intercollegiate Basketball League (EIBL).

The team posted an 18–4 overall record and a 9–2 conference record. After ending the regular season tied for the conference lead, the team won a one-game playoff against Columbia on March 17, 1932, in Philadelphia by a 38–35 margin for the EIBL championship.
