= 1931–32 Wisconsin Badgers men's basketball team =

American college basketball season

1931–32 Wisconsin Badgers men's basketball
- Conference: Big Ten Conference
- Record: 8–10 (3–9 Big Ten)
- Head coach: Walter Meanwell
- Home arena: UW Fieldhouse

1931–32 Big Ten Conference men's basketball standings
	Conf.				Overall
Team	W		L	PCT	W		L	PCT
Purdue	11	–	1	.917	17	–	1	.944
Minnesota	9	–	3	.750	15	–	3	.833
Northwestern	9	–	3	.750	13	–	5	.722
Michigan	8	–	4	.667	11	–	6	.647
Illinois	7	–	5	.583	11	–	6	.647
Ohio State	5	–	7	.417	9	–	9	.500
Indiana	4	–	8	.333	8	–	10	.444
Wisconsin	3	–	9	.250	8	–	10	.444
Iowa	3	–	9	.250	5	–	12	.294
Chicago	1	–	11	.083	2	–	15	.118

The 1931–32 Wisconsin Badgers men's basketball team represented University of Wisconsin–Madison. The head coach was Walter Meanwell, coaching his eighteenth season with the Badgers. The team played their home games at the UW Fieldhouse in Madison, Wisconsin and was a member of the Big Ten Conference.

== Schedule ==
Date time, TV	Rank^{#}	Opponent^{#}	Result	Record	Site city, state
Regular Season
12/11/1931*		Brigham Young	W 30–16	1–0	UW Fieldhouse; Madison, WI
12/15/1931*		Pittsburgh	W 30–29	2–0	UW Fieldhouse; Madison, WI
12/21/1931*		Marquette	L 23–26	2–1	Marquette Gymnasium; Milwaukee, WI
12/30/1931*		Maryland	W 32–30 ^{OT}	3–1	UW Fieldhouse; Madison, WI
1/04/1932		at Northwestern	L 30–31 ^{OT}	3–2 (0–1)	Patten Gymnasium; Evanston, IL
1/09/1932		Michigan	L 18–24	3–3 (0–2)	UW Fieldhouse; Madison, WI
1/11/1932		at Purdue	L 22–38	3–4 (0–3)	Memorial Gymnasium; West Lafayette, IN
1/16/1932		at Chicago	W 24–18	4–4 (1–3)	Bartlett Gymnasium; Chicago, IL
1/18/1932		Northwestern	L 24–28	4–5 (1–4)	UW Fieldhouse; Madison, WI
2/18/1932*		Marquette	W 18–16	5–5	UW Fieldhouse; Madison, WI
2/10/1932*		Butler	W 28–17	6–5	UW Fieldhouse; Madison, WI
2/15/1932		at Indiana	L 21–33	6–6 (1–5)	IU Fieldhouse; Bloomington, IN
2/20/1932		at Minnesota	L 17–43	6–7 (1–6)	Minnesota Field House; Minneapolis, MN
2/22/1932		Chicago	W 34–23	7–7 (2–6)	UW Fieldhouse; Madison, WI
2/27/1932		Purdue	L 21–28	7–8 (2–7)	UW Fieldhouse; Madison, WI
2/29/1932		at Michigan	L 13–33	7–9 (2–8)	Yost Fieldhouse; Ann Arbor, MI
3/05/1932		Indiana	W 35–26	8–9 (3–8)	UW Fieldhouse; Madison, WI
3/07/1932		Minnesota	L 21–23	8–10 (3–9)	UW Fieldhouse; Madison, WI
*Non-conference game. ^{#}Rankings from AP Poll. (#) Tournament seedings in parentheses.
