= 1931–32 Niagara Purple Eagles men's basketball team =

American college basketball season

1931–32 Niagara Purple Eagles men's basketball
- Conference: Independent
- Record: 19–5
- Head coach: John Gallagher (1st season)

The 1931–32 Niagara Purple Eagles men's basketball team represented Niagara University during the 1931–32 NCAA college men's basketball season. The head coach was John Gallagher, coaching his first season with the Purple Eagles.

== Schedule ==
Date time, TV	Opponent	Result	Record	Site city, state
	Toronto	W 36–16	1–0	Lewiston, NY
	at Cornell	W 33–27	2–0	Barton Hall; Ithaca, NY
	Alfred	W 32–18	3–0	Lewiston, NY
	at C.C.N.Y.	L 27–32	3–1	New York, NY
1/04/1932	at St. John's	L 26–36	3–2	Old Madison Square Garden; Queens, NY
	Manhattan	L 18–31	3–3	Riverdale, NY
	at Brooklyn K of C	W 19–16	4–3	
	at Hobart	W 31–19	5–3	Geneva, NY
	at Rochester	W 22–19	6–3	Rochester, NY
	at Buffalo	L 24–40	6–4	Buffalo, NY
	St. Lawrence	W 20–14	7–4	Lewiston, NY
	Rochester	W 20–14	8–4	Lewiston, NY
1/24/1932	at St. Bonaventure	W 30–24	9–4	Butler Gym; Olean, NY
	at DePaul	W 30–25	9–4	Chicago, IL
	at St. Lawrence	L 29–31	10–5	Canton, NY
	at Clarkson Tech	W 36–33	11–5	
	Hobart	W 35–12	12–5	Lewiston, NY
	Clarkson Tech	W 37–22	13–5	Lewiston, NY
	Hamilton	W 40–25	14–5	Lewiston, NY
	Alfred	W 46–30	15–5	Lewiston, NY
	Buffalo	W 46–42	16–5	Lewiston, NY
	Alfred	W 43–18	17–5	Lewiston, NY
2/28/1932	St. Bonaventure	W 33–30	18–5	Lewiston, NY
	John Carroll	W 37–20	19–5	Lewiston, NY
*Non-conference game. (#) Tournament seedings in parentheses.
