= 1931–32 Cincinnati Bearcats men's basketball team =

American college basketball season

1931–32 Cincinnati Bearcats men's basketball
- Conference: Buckeye Athletic Association
- Record: 4–11 (2–10 BAA)
- Head coach: Frank Rice (4th season)
- Captains: Ray Barsdale; Robert Reuss
- Home arena: Schmidlapp Gymnasium

The 1931–32 Cincinnati Bearcats men's basketball team represented the University of Cincinnati during the 1931–32 NCAA men's basketball season. The head coach was Frank Rice, coaching his fourth season with the Bearcats. The team finished with an overall record of 4–11.

== Schedule ==
Date time, TV	Opponent	Result	Record	Site city, state
December 11	Georgetown (KY)	W 41–23	1–0	Schmidlapp Gymnasium; Cincinnati, OH
December 18	Dayton	W 37–29	2–0	Schmidlapp Gymnasium; Cincinnati, OH
January 2	at DePauw	L 23–25	2–1	Greencastle, IN
January 8	at Wittenberg	L 17–28	2–2	Springfield, OH
January 12	Ohio Wesleyan	L 24–26 ^{OT}	2–3	Schmidlapp Gymnasium; Cincinnati, OH
January 15	DePauw	L 26–27	2–4	Schmidlapp Gymnasium; Cincinnati, OH
January 20	at Denison	L 24–25	2–5	Granville, OH
January 23	at Miami	W 32–26	3–5	Oxford, OH
February 5	at Ohio	L 23–42	3–6	Men's Gymnasium; Athens, OH
February 6	at Muskingum	L 21–29	3–7	New Concord, OH
February 9	Wittenberg	L 34–44	3–8	Schmidlapp Gymnasium; Cincinnati, OH
February 18	at Ohio Wesleyan	L 28–60	3–9	Delaware, OH
February 22	Denison	L 13–28	3–10	Schmidlapp Gymnasium; Cincinnati, OH
February 25	Ohio	W 34–32	4–10	Schmidlapp Gymnasium; Cincinnati, OH
February 29	at Miami (OH)	L 26–30	4–11	Schmidlapp Gymnasium; Cincinnati, OH
*Non-conference game. (#) Tournament seedings in parentheses.
