= Roy Mundorff =

American college athletics coach and administrator (1897–1966)

Biographical details
- Born: February 20, 1897; Gettysburg, Pennsylvania, U.S.
- Died: December 2, 1966 (aged 69); Atlanta, Georgia, U.S.
- Education: Gettysburg College

Coaching career (HC unless noted)

Men's basketball
- 1921–1922: New Madison HS (OH)
- 1922–1924: Atlanta Central YMCA
- 1924–1926: Georgia Tech (freshmen)
- 1926–1943: Georgia Tech

Baseball
- 1926–1939: Georgia Tech (freshmen)
- 1940–1943: Georgia Tech

Administrative career (AD unless noted)
- 1946–1951: Georgia Tech (asst. AD)
- 1952–1953: Louisville

Head coaching record
- Overall: 173–134 (.564) (basketball); 26–36–1 (.421) (baseball)

Accomplishments and honors

Championships
- 1x SEC men's basketball tournament champion (1938)

Roy McClellan "Punk" Mundorff (February 20, 1897 – December 2, 1966) was an American basketball coach and administrator who was the head coach of the Georgia Tech Yellow Jackets men's basketball team from 1926 to 1943, head coach of the Georgia Tech Yellow Jackets baseball team from 1940 to 1943, and athletic director at Louisville from 1952 to 1953.

== Early life ==
Mundorff was born in Gettysburg, Pennsylvania, on February 20, 1897 to J. McClelland and Emma Florence (Culp) Mundorff. He graduated from the Gettysburg Academy in 1916. He was a member of the Penn State basketball (1917–18), football (1917–18), and baseball teams (1918–1919). From 1918 to 1919, he played for the Bethlehem Sparrows Point Shipyard basketball team. He was also a member of the Penn State Students' Army Training Corps during World War I. He then attended Gettysburg College, where he played basketball and baseball. He graduated from Gettysburg in 1921 with a degree in mathematics.

== Coaching ==
During the 1921–22 academic year, Mundorff taught mathematics and coached basketball at New Madison High School in New Madison, Ohio. In 1922, he joined the Georgia Tech faculty as an assistant professor of mathematics.

In 1922, Mundorff became coach of the Atlanta Central YMCA's basketball team. In 1924, he was named Georgia Tech's head freshman basketball coach. He was promoted to varsity coach in 1926. He led Tech to a 173–134 record over seventeen seasons. His best season was in 1937–38, when the Yellow Jackets went 18–2 and won the SEC men's basketball tournament.

In 1926, Mundorff began coaching Georgia Tech's freshman baseball team. From 1940 to 1943, Mundorff compiled a 26–36–1 record as the Yellow Jackets' varsity baseball coach.

== Military service ==
Mundorff joined the United States Naval Reserve in 1931 after becoming acquainted with officers who taught at Georgia Tech's Navy Reserve Officers' Training Corps. He was ordered to active duty in 1940 and assigned to the training school at Harvard University in 1943. He headed the Harvard Naval Radar school during World War II, then served as the executive officer for the Naval Training School at Harvard. He was discharged in 1946.

== Administration ==
After leaving the Navy, Mundorff returned to Georgia Tech as assistant athletic director, but did not resume coaching. In 1952, he became the director of athletics at the University of Louisville. He announced his resignation on October 6, 1953 – three days after the Louisville Cardinals football team lost 59–0 to Florida State. From 1954 to 1964, Mundorff was the supervisor of basketball officials for the Southeastern Conference.

== Personal life ==
On June 2, 1928, Mundorff married Edith May Nelson of Thomaston, Georgia in Marion, Georgia. They had two sons – Roy Jr. and Thomas.

== Death ==
On December 1, 1966, Mundorff suffered a heart attack while attending a Georgia Tech freshman basketball game at Alexander Memorial Coliseum. He was admitted to an Atlanta hospital and was reported to be in good condition. He suffered another heart attack on December 2 and died around 7 pm.
