= 1931–32 Idaho Vandals men's basketball team =

American college basketball season

1931–32 Idaho Vandals men's basketball
- Conference: Pacific Coast Conference
- Record: 8–16 (2–14 PCC)
- Head coach: Rich Fox (5th season)
- Assistant coach: Glenn Jacoby
- Home arena: Memorial Gymnasium

1931–32 Pacific Coast Conference men's basketball standings
	Conf.				Overall
Team	W		L	PCT	W		L	PCT
North
Washington	12	–	4	.750	19	–	6	.760
Washington State	11	–	5	.688	22	–	5	.815
Oregon State	7	–	9	.438	13	–	11	.542
Oregon	7	–	9	.438	13	–	11	.542
Idaho	2	–	14	.125	8	–	16	.333
South
California †	8	–	3	.727	16	–	8	.667
USC	8	–	3	.727	10	–	12	.455
UCLA	4	–	7	.364	9	–	10	.474
Stanford	2	–	9	.182	6	–	13	.316
† Conference playoff series winner

The 1931–32 Idaho Vandals men's basketball team represented the University of Idaho during the 1931–32 NCAA college basketball season. Members of the Pacific Coast Conference, the Vandals were led by fifth-year head coach Rich Fox and played their home games on campus at Memorial Gymnasium in Moscow, Idaho.

The Vandals were 8–16 overall and 2–14 in conference play.
