= 1931–32 Michigan Wolverines men's basketball team =

American college basketball season

1931–32 Michigan Wolverines men's basketball
- Conference: Big Ten Conference
- Record: 11–6 (8–4 Big Ten)
- Head coach: Franklin Cappon
- Captain: Norman Daniels
- Home arena: Yost Field House

1931–32 Big Ten Conference men's basketball standings
	Conf.				Overall
Team	W		L	PCT	W		L	PCT
Purdue	11	–	1	.917	17	–	1	.944
Minnesota	9	–	3	.750	15	–	3	.833
Northwestern	9	–	3	.750	13	–	5	.722
Michigan	8	–	4	.667	11	–	6	.647
Illinois	7	–	5	.583	11	–	6	.647
Ohio State	5	–	7	.417	9	–	9	.500
Indiana	4	–	8	.333	8	–	10	.444
Wisconsin	3	–	9	.250	8	–	10	.444
Iowa	3	–	9	.250	5	–	12	.294
Chicago	1	–	11	.083	2	–	15	.118

The 1931–32 Michigan Wolverines men's basketball team represented the University of Michigan in intercollegiate basketball during the 1931–32 season. The team compiled an 11–6 record and 8–4 against Big Ten Conference opponents. The team finished in fourth place in the Big Ten.

Franklin Cappon was in his first year as the team's head coach. Norman Daniels was the team captain and the team's leading scorer with 148 points in 17 games for an average of 8.7 points per game.

== Scoring statistics ==
Player	Games	Field goals	Free throws	Points	Points per game
Norman Daniels	17	54	40	148	8.7
DeForest Eveland	16	35	16	86	5.4
Henry Weiss	17	32	6	73	4.3
Ivy Williamson	17	24	15	63	3.7
James Garner	15	17	11	45	3.0
Robert Petrie	17	16	7	39	2.3
Totals	17	187	100	474	27.9
