= 1931–32 Washington State Cougars men's basketball team =

American college basketball season

1931–32 Washington State Cougars men's basketball
- Conference: Pacific Coast Conference
- Record: 22–5 (11–5 PCC)
- Head coach: Jack Friel (4th season)
- Home arena: WSC Gymnasium

1931–32 Pacific Coast Conference men's basketball standings
	Conf.				Overall
Team	W		L	PCT	W		L	PCT
North
Washington	12	–	4	.750	19	–	6	.760
Washington State	11	–	5	.688	22	–	5	.815
Oregon State	7	–	9	.438	13	–	11	.542
Oregon	7	–	9	.438	13	–	11	.542
Idaho	2	–	14	.125	8	–	16	.333
South
California †	8	–	3	.727	16	–	8	.667
USC	8	–	3	.727	10	–	12	.455
UCLA	4	–	7	.364	9	–	10	.474
Stanford	2	–	9	.182	6	–	13	.316
† Conference playoff series winner

The 1931–32 Washington State Cougars men's basketball team represented Washington State College for the 1931–32 college basketball season. Led by fourth-year head coach Jack Friel, the Cougars were members of the Pacific Coast Conference and played their home games on campus at WSC Gymnasium in Pullman, Washington.

The Cougars were 22–5 overall in the regular season and 11–5 in conference play, second in the Northern division. Rival Washington won the last two games to take the division title, the Huskies' fifth straight.
