= Rex Enright =

Player and coach of American football and basketball

- Enright pictured in Garnet & Black 1939, South Carolina yearbook

Biographical details
- Born: March 19, 1901; Rockford, Illinois, U.S.
- Died: April 6, 1960 (aged 59); Columbia, South Carolina, U.S.

Playing career

Football
- 1923: Notre Dame
- 1925: Notre Dame
- 1926–1927: Green Bay Packers

Basketball
- 1922–1924: Notre Dame
- 1925–1926: Notre Dame
- Positions: Fullback (football); Forward (basketball)

Coaching career (HC unless noted)

Football
- 1930: North Carolina (assistant)
- 1931–1937: Georgia (assistant)
- 1938–1942: South Carolina
- 1943: Georgia Pre-Flight
- 1946–1955: South Carolina

Basketball
- 1931–1937: Georgia
- 1942–1943: South Carolina

Administrative career (AD unless noted)
- 1938–1955: South Carolina

Head coaching record
- Overall: 69–70–7 (football); 80–57 (basketball)
- Tournaments: Basketball; 4–1 (SoCon); 1–5 (SEC)

Accomplishments and honors

Championships
- Basketball; 1 SoCon tournament (1932)

Rex Edward Enright (March 19, 1901 – April 6, 1960) was an American football and basketball player, coach, and college athletics administrator. He played college football and college basketball at the University of Notre Dame in the 1920s. After graduating from Notre Dame in 1926, he played professional football in the National Football League (NFL) with the Green Bay Packers for two seasons. Enright served as the head football coach at the University of South Carolina from 1938 to 1942 and again from 1946 to 1956, compiling a record of 64–69–7. He was also the head basketball coach at the University of Georgia from 1931 to 1937 and at South Carolina for part of one season, in 1942–43, tallying a career college basketball coaching record of 80–57.

== Early life and playing career ==
Enright was the son of James E. Enright (March 1871 – ?) and May C. Billick (January 1882 – ?). He was born in Rockford, Illinois. He graduated from Central High School in Rockford, where he played on the 1918 state champion basketball team, and was team captain and played running back on the football team. He then graduated from the University of Notre Dame where he played running back for Knute Rockne on the football team, and also played on the Irish basketball team. Enright played fullback for the Green Bay Packers in 1926 and 1927.

== Coaching career ==
In the early 1930s, Enright was an assistant football coach at the University of North Carolina at Chapel Hill. From 1931 to 1937, he was the head basketball coach at the University of Georgia and assistant football coach. In late December 1937, he was hired as head football coach and athletic director at the University of South Carolina. After the 1942 season, he joined the United States Navy serving as a lieutenant and working mostly in their athletic program in the United States. He completed his service in the navy in 1946, and returned to the Gamecocks as head football coach succeeding John D. McMillan, and remained until 1955 when he resigned for health reasons. He hired Warren Giese as his successor, and continued as athletic director until 1960. The Rex Enright Athletic Center on the South Carolina campus was named for him and the Rex Enright Award (also known as the Captain's Cup) given to the football captains of the previous season. He was considered one of the "ring leaders" in the formation of the Atlantic Coast Conference in 1953.

== Personal life, death, and honors ==
Enright was to married Alice Thoren (1903–1971). They had daughters: Jean (1926–2015), Joyce (1931–2022), and Alice. Enright died on April 6, 1960, from peptic ulcers and rheumatic heart lesions, at Columbia Hospital in Columbia, South Carolina. He had been admitted to the hospital a week earlier.

Enright is a member of the South Carolina Athletic Hall of Fame. In 2009, the University of South Carolina recognized Enright as the winningest football coach in school history. His record 64 wins was highlighted during the halftime show of South Carolina's football game versus Florida Atlantic on September 19, where Enright's daughter, Jean Smith, and great-grandson, Brian Garrett, accepted the presentation in his memory. That record lasted only two more years until Steve Spurrier passed him in 2011.

== Head coaching record ==
=== Football ===
Year	Team	Overall	Conference	Standing	Bowl/playoffs
South Carolina Gamecocks (Southern Conference) (1938–1942)
1938	South Carolina	6–4–1	2–2	T–6th	
1939	South Carolina	3–6–1	1–3	T–11th	
1940	South Carolina	3–6	1–3	T–12th	
1941	South Carolina	4–4–1	4–0–1	2nd	
1942	South Carolina	1–7–1	1–4	14th	
Georgia Pre-Flight Skycrackers (Independent) (1943)
1943	Georgia Pre-Flight	5–1			
Georgia Pre-Flight:		5–1			
South Carolina Gamecocks (Southern Conference) (1946–1952)
1946	South Carolina	5–3	4–2	4th	
1947	South Carolina	6–2–1	4–1–1	3rd	
1948	South Carolina	3–5	1–3	13th	
1949	South Carolina	4–6	3–3	T–7th	
1950	South Carolina	3–4–2	2–4–1	12th	
1951	South Carolina	5–4	5–3	T–7th	
1952	South Carolina	5–5	2–4	T–10th	
South Carolina Gamecocks (Atlantic Coast Conference) (1953–1955)
1953	South Carolina	7–3	2–3	T–3rd	
1954	South Carolina	6–4	3–3	4th	
1955	South Carolina	3–6	1–5	T–6th	
South Carolina:		64–69–7	36–43–3		
Total:		69–70–7			

=== Basketball ===
Record table
Season	Team	Overall	Conference	Standing	Postseason
Georgia Bulldogs (Southern Conference) (1931–1932)
1931–32	Georgia	19–7	7–4	7th	
Georgia Bulldogs (Southeastern Conference) (1932–1937)
1932–33	Georgia	9–10	5–6	7th	
1933–34	Georgia	10–9	3–6	10th	
1934–35	Georgia	12–8	4–5	9th	
1935–36	Georgia	9–11	6–7	10th	
1936–37	Georgia	10–6	5–3	T–5th	
Georgia:		69–51	30–31		
South Carolina Gamecocks (Southern Conference) (1943)
1942–43	South Carolina	11–6 (Note: Frank Johnson coached the first two games of the season, both non-conference contests, before Enright took over the team in early January for the remainder of the year. South Carolina finished the season 13–6 overall.)	6–3	3rd	
South Carolina:		11–6	6–3		
Total:		80–57			
National champion Postseason invitational champion Conference regular season champion Conference regular season and conference tournament champion Division regular season champion Division regular season and conference tournament champion Conference tournament champion

== See also ==
- List of college football head coaches with non-consecutive tenure
