= 1931–32 Indiana Hoosiers men's basketball team =

American college basketball season

1931–32 Indiana Hoosiers men's basketball
- Conference: Big Ten Conference
- Record: 8–10 (4–8 Big Ten)
- Head coach: Everett Dean (8th season)
- Captain: Jay Campbell
- Home arena: The Fieldhouse

1931–32 Big Ten Conference men's basketball standings
	Conf.				Overall
Team	W		L	PCT	W		L	PCT
Purdue	11	–	1	.917	17	–	1	.944
Minnesota	9	–	3	.750	15	–	3	.833
Northwestern	9	–	3	.750	13	–	5	.722
Michigan	8	–	4	.667	11	–	6	.647
Illinois	7	–	5	.583	11	–	6	.647
Ohio State	5	–	7	.417	9	–	9	.500
Indiana	4	–	8	.333	8	–	10	.444
Wisconsin	3	–	9	.250	8	–	10	.444
Iowa	3	–	9	.250	5	–	12	.294
Chicago	1	–	11	.083	2	–	15	.118

The 1931–32 Indiana Hoosiers men's basketball team represented Indiana University. Their head coach was Everett Dean, who was in his 8th year. The team played its home games in The Fieldhouse in Bloomington, Indiana, and was a member of the Big Ten Conference.

The Hoosiers finished the regular season with an overall record of 8–10 and a conference record of 4–8, finishing 7th in the Big Ten Conference.

== Roster ==
No.	Name	Position	Ht.	Year	Hometown
3	Jay Campbell	F	5–7	Sr.	Shelbyville, Indiana
4	Warren Tucker	F	6–1	N/A	Salem, Indiana
5	Bernard Dickey	F/C	6–1	Jr.	Fort Wayne, Indiana
8	Arnold Suddith	G	6–1	So.	Martinsville, Indiana
9	Joseph Zeller	G	6–1	Sr.	East Chicago, Indiana
10	Bill Blagrave	G	6–2	Sr.	Washington, Indiana
12	Ernest Youngblood	F	5–11	So.	Veedersburg, Indiana
13	Glendon Hodson	F	6–1	Jr.	Amo, Indiana
14	Halary Sawicki	C	6–3	Jr.	Georgetown, Illinois
15	Victor Dauer	F	5–11	Sr.	Gary, Indiana
16	Ray Dauer	F	6–1	So.	Gary, Indiana
17	William Cordell	G	5–9	Jr.	Bloomington, Indiana
18	Woodrow Weir	F	5–10	So.	Scottsburg, Indiana
21	Taylor Hoffar	C	6–1	Jr.	Seymour, Indiana
22	George Reed	C	6–3	N/A	Kokomo, Indiana

== Schedule/results ==
Date time, TV	Rank^{#}	Opponent^{#}	Result	Record	Site city, state
Regular season
12/8/1931*		Miami (OH)	W 24–18	1–0	The Fieldhouse; Bloomington, IN
12/12/1931*		at Notre Dame	W 23–18	2–0	Notre Dame Fieldhouse; Notre Dame, IN
12/16/1931*		Pittsburgh	L 24–29	2–1	The Fieldhouse; Bloomington, IN
12/30/1931*		at DePauw	L 19–26	2–2	Greencastle, IN
1/4/1932		at Purdue; Rivalry	L 30–49	2–3 (0–1)	Memorial Gymnasium; West Lafayette, IN
1/9/1932		at Northwestern	L 23–29	2–4 (0–2)	Old Patten Gymnasium; Evanston, IL
1/11/1932		Illinois; Rivalry	L 22–30	2–5 (0–3)	The Fieldhouse; Bloomington, IN
1/16/1932		at Minnesota	L 35–37	2–6 (0–4)	Minnesota Field House; Minneapolis, MN
1/18/1932		Iowa	W 35–27	3–6 (1–4)	The Fieldhouse; Bloomington, IN
2/2/1932*		at Xavier	W 18–16	4–6 (1–4)	Schmidt Field House; Cincinnati, OH
2/4/1932*		Marquette	W 30–18	5–6 (1–4)	The Fieldhouse; Bloomington, IN
2/8/1932		Northwestern	L 25–29	5–7 (1–5)	The Fieldhouse; Bloomington, IN
2/13/1932		Minnesota	W 27–22	6–7 (2–5)	The Fieldhouse; Bloomington, IN
2/15/1932		Wisconsin	W 33–21	7–7 (3–5)	The Fieldhouse; Bloomington, IN
2/20/1932		at Iowa	W 34–33	8–7 (4–5)	Iowa Field House; Iowa City, IA
2/22/1932		Purdue; Rivalry	L 29–42	8–8 (4–6)	The Fieldhouse; Bloomington, IN
3/5/1932		at Wisconsin	L 26–34	8–9 (4–7)	Wisconsin Field House; Madison, WI
3/7/1932		at Illinois; Rivalry	L 32–33	8–10 (4–8)	Huff Hall; Champaign, IL
*Non-conference game. ^{#}Rankings from AP Poll. (#) Tournament seedings in parentheses.
