= 1931–32 Southern Conference men's basketball season =

1931–32 Southern Conference Men's Basketball Season
- League: NCAA
- Sport: Basketball
- Number of teams: 23

Tournament
- Champions: Georgia
- Runners-up: North Carolina

Basketball seasons
- ← 30–31 32–33 →

1931–32 Southern Conference men's basketball standings
	Conf.				Overall
Team	W		L	PCT	W		L	PCT
Kentucky	9	–	1	.900	15	–	2	.882
Maryland	9	–	1	.900	16	–	4	.800
Auburn	9	–	2	.818	12	–	3	.800
Alabama	11	–	3	.786	16	–	4	.800
North Carolina	6	–	3	.667	16	–	5	.762
Virginia	6	–	3	.667	13	–	8	.619
Georgia †	7	–	4	.636	19	–	7	.731
Ole Miss	8	–	5	.615	9	–	6	.600
Georgia Tech	5	–	3	.625	7	–	6	.538
North Carolina State	6	–	4	.600	10	–	6	.625
Duke	6	–	5	.545	14	–	11	.560
LSU	8	–	8	.500	11	–	9	.550
Tennessee	5	–	5	.500	8	–	7	.533
South Carolina	2	–	2	.500	9	–	7	.563
Vanderbilt	5	–	7	.417	8	–	11	.421
Mississippi A&M	4	–	7	.364	5	–	10	.333
Tulane	5	–	9	.357	6	–	10	.375
Florida	4	–	10	.286	8	–	12	.400
Washington and Lee	3	–	8	.273	9	–	10	.474
Virginia Tech	2	–	8	.200	8	–	9	.471
Clemson	2	–	9	.182	8	–	12	.400
Sewanee	1	–	7	.125	3	–	9	.250
VMI	0	–	9	.000	0	–	14	.000
† Southern Conference Tournament winner

The 1931–32 Southern Conference men's basketball season consisted of a record 23 member institutions. The regular season champions were Maryland and Kentucky. They each had .900%. The tournament champion was Georgia.

== Southern Conference standings ==
#	Team	Conference	Pct.	Overall	Pct.
1	Maryland	9–1	.900	16–4	.800
2	Kentucky	9–1	.900	15–2	.882
3	Auburn	9–2	.818	12–3	.800
4	Alabama	11–3	.786	16–4	.800
5	North Carolina	6–3	.667	16–5	.762
6	Virginia	6–3	.667	13–8	.619
7	Georgia	7–4	.636	19–7	.731
8	Georgia Tech	5–3	.625	7–6	.539
9	Mississippi	8–5	.615	9–6	.600
10	North Carolina State	6–4	.600	10–6	.625
11	Duke	6–5	.546	14–11	.560
12	Louisiana State	8–8	.500	11–9	.550
13	Tennessee	5–5	.500	8–7	.533
14	South Carolina	2–2	.500	9–7	.565
15	Vanderbilt	5–7	.417	8–11	.421
16	Mississippi State	4–7	.364	5–10	.333
17	Tulane	5–9	.357	6–10	.375
18	Florida	4–10	.286	8–12	.400
19	Washington & Lee	3–8	.273	9–10	.474
20	Virginia Tech	3–8	.273	8–9	.471
21	Clemson	2–9	.182	8–12	.400
22	South	1–7	.125	3–9	.250
23	VMI	0–9	.000	0–14	.000

== Conference Tournament ==
The tournament was seeded so that no team would face a school that they had faced in the regular season in the first round of the tournament.

First Round; Friday, February 26
?	Maryland	24
?	Florida	39
?	Duke	44
?	Vanderbilt	32
?	Georgia	48
?	Mississippi State	26
?	Virginia	20
?	Alabama	16
?	Auburn	34
?	North Carolina State	33
?	Louisiana State	36
?	Georgia Tech	33
?	North Carolina	35
?	Tennessee	25
?	Kentucky	50
?	Tulane	30

Second Round; Saturday, February 27
?	Florida	22
?	Duke	33
?	Georgia	40
?	Virginia	19
?	Auburn	30
?	Louisiana State	22
?	North Carolina	43
?	Kentucky	42

Semifinals; Sunday, February 29
?	Duke	32
?	Georgia	43
?	Auburn	31
?	North Carolina	52

Final; Monday, March 1
?	Georgia	26
?	North Carolina	24

=== First round ===
- Mississippi and South Carolina did not participate
- Atlanta, Georgia
- February 26, 1932
- Virginia 20, Alabama 16
- North Carolina 35, Tennessee 25
- Duke 44, Vanderbilt 32
- Kentucky 50, Tulane 30
- Florida 39, Maryland 24
- Auburn 34, North Carolina State 33
- Georgia 48, Mississippi State 26
- Louisiana State 36, Georgia Tech 33

=== Quarterfinals ===
- February 27, 1932
- Duke 33, Florida 22
- North Carolina 43, Kentucky 42
- Auburn 30, Louisiana State 22
- Georgia 40, Virginia 19

=== Semifinals ===
- February 29, 1932
- North Carolina 52, Auburn 31
- Georgia 43, Duke 32

=== Championship ===
- March 1, 1932
- Georgia 26, North Carolina 24

=== All-Tournament team ===
==== First Team ====
- Tom Alexander, North Carolina
- T.W. Lumpkin, Auburn
- Bill Strickland, Georgia
- Virgil Weathers, North Carolina
- Leroy Young, Georgia

==== Second Team ====
- Louis Berger, Maryland
- Wilmer Hines, North Carolina
- Forest Sale, Kentucky
- Vernon Smith, Georgia
- James Thompson, Duke
