= 1931–32 Duke Blue Devils men's basketball team =

American college basketball season

1931–32 Duke Blue Devils men's basketball
- Conference: Southern Conference
- Record: 14–11 (6–5 Southern)
- Head coach: Eddie Cameron
- Home arena: Card Gymnasium

1931–32 Southern Conference men's basketball standings
	Conf.				Overall
Team	W		L	PCT	W		L	PCT
Kentucky	9	–	1	.900	15	–	2	.882
Maryland	9	–	1	.900	16	–	4	.800
Auburn	9	–	2	.818	12	–	3	.800
Alabama	11	–	3	.786	16	–	4	.800
North Carolina	6	–	3	.667	16	–	5	.762
Virginia	6	–	3	.667	13	–	8	.619
Georgia †	7	–	4	.636	19	–	7	.731
Ole Miss	8	–	5	.615	9	–	6	.600
Georgia Tech	5	–	3	.625	7	–	6	.538
North Carolina State	6	–	4	.600	10	–	6	.625
Duke	6	–	5	.545	14	–	11	.560
LSU	8	–	8	.500	11	–	9	.550
Tennessee	5	–	5	.500	8	–	7	.533
South Carolina	2	–	2	.500	9	–	7	.563
Vanderbilt	5	–	7	.417	8	–	11	.421
Mississippi A&M	4	–	7	.364	5	–	10	.333
Tulane	5	–	9	.357	6	–	10	.375
Florida	4	–	10	.286	8	–	12	.400
Washington and Lee	3	–	8	.273	9	–	10	.474
Virginia Tech	2	–	8	.200	8	–	9	.471
Clemson	2	–	9	.182	8	–	12	.400
Sewanee	1	–	7	.125	3	–	9	.250
VMI	0	–	9	.000	0	–	14	.000
† Southern Conference Tournament winner

The 1931–32 Duke Blue Devils men's basketball team represented Duke University during the 1931–32 men's college basketball season. The head coach was Eddie Cameron, coaching his fourth season with the Blue Devils. The team finished with an overall record of 14–11.
