= Vernon Smith (American football) =

American football player (1908–1988)

Biographical details
- Born: January 14, 1908; Macon, Georgia, U.S.
- Died: September 29, 1988 (aged 80); La Jolla, California, U.S.

Playing career

Football
- 1929–1931: Georgia

Basketball
- 1929–1932: Georgia

Baseball
- 1930–1931: Georgia
- Position: End (football)

Coaching career (HC unless noted)

Football
- 1938–1939: South Carolina (ends)
- 1940–1941: Ole Miss (ends)

Basketball
- 1937–1938: Georgia

Baseball
- 1934–1937: Georgia
- 1938–1939: South Carolina
- 1946–1947: South Carolina

Head coaching record
- Overall: 1–1 (basketball); 70–93 (baseball)

Accomplishments and honors

Awards
- Consensus All-American (1931); First-team All-American (1929); 3× All-Southern (1929, 1930, 1931)
- College Football Hall of Fame; Inducted in 1979 (profile)

Vernon "Catfish" Smith (January 14, 1908 – September 29, 1988) was an American football, basketball, and baseball player, coach, and military officer. A three-sport athlete at the University of Georgia, Smith was named to the 1931 College Football All-America Team as an end. After his playing days, he served as the co-head basketball coach at his alma mater during the 1937–38 season. Smith was also the head baseball coach at Georgia from 1934 to 1937 and at the University of South Carolina from 1938 to 1939 and again from 1946 to 1947. He was inducted into the College Football Hall of Fame as a player in 1979.

== Early life and playing career ==
Smith was born Macon, Georgia. His nickname of "Catfish" is attributed to a story in which he bit the head off of one as a 25-cent bet while a student at Lanier High School in Macon. He and a friend were fishing in Walnut Creek.

Smith played football at the University of Georgia from 1929 to 1931 and was named an All-American in 1931. In 1929, he scored all 15 points for Georgia in an upset of Yale—scoring one touchdown by falling on a blocked punt in the end zone and another by receiving a pass, kicking an extra point and tackling a Yale player for a safety. The game was the first-ever played at Sanford Stadium. Smith wore number 9, and stood 6'2" and 190 pounds. He made an all-time Georgia Bulldogs football team picked in 1935. He was nominated though not selected for an Associated Press All-Time Southeast 1920-1969 era team. Smith was a member of the Sigma Chi fraternity.

== Coaching and military career ==
After completing his Georgia career as a football player in 1931 (he graduated with a B.S. in 1933), Catfish Smith went into coaching from 1932 to 1941 and coached football at Georgia, the University of South Carolina and the University of Mississippi. He was also the head baseball coach at the University of Georgia and the University of South Carolina. He then joined the United States Army Air Forces, retiring in 1963 with the rank of colonel.

== Honors ==
Smith's sports honors include induction into the Georgia Sports Hall of Fame in 1966 and in the College Football Hall of Fame in 1979.

His military honors included the Legion of Merit, Air Force Commendation Medal, World War II Victory Medal, National Defense Service Medal, Air Force Reserve Medal, and Air Force Longevity Medal.

== Sources ==
- Charles E. Martin, I've Seen 'Em All: Half Century of Georgia Football, p. 57, The McGregor Company, Athens, Georgia, 1961.
- Cleveland, Chester (1935). The Sigma Chi Directory. USA: Sigma Chi Fraternity. p. 27.
