= 1935–36 NCAA men's basketball season =

Men's collegiate basketball season

- Helms National Champions: Notre Dame (retroactive selection in 1943)
- Player of the Year (Helms): John Moir, Notre Dame (retroactive selection in 1944)

The 1935–36 NCAA men's basketball season began in December 1935, progressed through the regular season and conference tournaments, and concluded in March 1936.

== Rule changes ==
A new rule prohibited any offensive player with the ball from standing in the free-throw lane (also known as the "key") for more than three seconds. Previously, this rule had applied only to a player who had possession of the ball.

== Season headlines ==
- In February 1943, the Helms Athletic Foundation retroactively selected Notre Dame as its national champion for the 1935–36 season.
- In 1995, the Premo-Porretta Power Poll retroactively selected Long Island as its top-ranked team for the 1935–36 season.

== Conference membership changes ==
School	Former conference	New conference Metropolitan New York Conference
Brooklyn Bulldogs	Non-major basketball program	Metropolitan New York Conference
CCNY Beavers	Independent	Metropolitan New York Conference
Fordham Rams	Independent	Metropolitan New York Conference
Long Island Blackbirds	Independent	Metropolitan New York Conference
Manhattan Jaspers	Independent	Metropolitan New York Conference
NYU Violets	Independent	Metropolitan New York Conference
Penn State Nittany Lions	Independent	Eastern Intercollegiate Conference
St. Francis (NY) Terriers	Independent	Metropolitan New York Conference
St. John's Redmen	Independent	Metropolitan New York Conference
Texas State M&M Miners	Independent	Border Conference

== Regular season ==
=== Conferences ===
==== Conference winners and tournaments ====
Conference	Regular season winner	Conference player of the year	Conference tournament	Tournament venue (City)	Tournament winner
Big Six Conference	Kansas	None selected	No Tournament		
Big Ten Conference	Indiana & Purdue	None selected	No Tournament		
Border Conference	Arizona	None selected	No Tournament		
Eastern Intercollegiate Basketball League	Columbia	None selected	No Tournament		
Eastern Intercollegiate Conference	Carnegie Tech & Pittsburgh	None selected	No Tournament; Carnegie Tech defeated Pittsburgh in a single-game conference playoff		
Metropolitan New York Conference	Long Island	None selected	No Tournament		
Missouri Valley Conference	Creighton, Drake, & Oklahoma A&M	None selected	No Tournament		
Pacific Coast Conference	Washington (North); Stanford & USC (South)		No Tournament; Stanford defeated USC in divisional playoff game; Stanford defeated Washington in best-of-three conference championship playoff series		
Rocky Mountain Athletic Conference	Wyoming (Eastern); Utah State (Western)		No Tournament		
Southeastern Conference	Tennessee	None selected	1936 SEC men's basketball tournament	Alumni Memorial Gym (Knoxville, Tennessee)	Tennessee
Southern Conference	Washington and Lee	None selected	1936 Southern Conference men's basketball tournament	Thompson Gym (Raleigh, North Carolina)	North Carolina
Southwest Conference	Arkansas	None selected	No Tournament		

==== Conference standings ====
1935–36 Big Six Conference men's basketball standings
	Conf.				Overall
Team	W		L	PCT	W		L	PCT
Kansas	10	–	0	1.000	21	–	2	.913
Nebraska	7	–	3	.700	13	–	8	.619
Oklahoma	5	–	5	.500	9	–	8	.529
Iowa State	3	–	7	.300	8	–	8	.500
Kansas State	3	–	7	.300	9	–	9	.500
Missouri	2	–	8	.200	5	–	12	.294

1935–36 Big Ten Conference men's basketball standings
	Conf.				Overall
Team	W		L	PCT	W		L	PCT
Indiana	11	–	1	.917	18	–	2	.900
Purdue	11	–	1	.917	16	–	4	.800
Michigan	7	–	5	.583	15	–	5	.750
Illinois	7	–	5	.583	13	–	6	.684
Northwestern	7	–	5	.583	13	–	6	.684
Ohio State	5	–	7	.417	12	–	8	.600
Iowa	5	–	7	.417	9	–	10	.474
Wisconsin	4	–	8	.333	11	–	9	.550
Minnesota	3	–	9	.250	7	–	17	.292
Chicago	0	–	12	.000	6	–	14	.300

1935–36 Border Conference men's basketball standings
	Conf.				Overall
Team	W		L	PCT	W		L	PCT
Arizona†	11	–	5	.688	16	–	7	.696
Arizona State–Tempe	11	–	7	.611	12	–	14	.462
Texas Tech	8	–	6	.571	14	–	6	.700
New Mexico	11	–	9	.550	16	–	10	.615
Arizona State–Flagstaff	7	–	7	.500	15	–	9	.625
New Mexico A&M	8	–	8	.500	10	–	9	.526
Texas State M&M	0	–	8	.000	0	–	12	.000
† Conference championship winner

1935–36 Eastern Intercollegiate Basketball League standings
	Conf.				Overall
Team	W		L	PCT	W		L	PCT
Columbia	12	–	0	1.000	19	–	3	.864
Penn	7	–	5	.583	12	–	9	.571
Dartmouth	6	–	6	.500	11	–	10	.524
Yale	6	–	6	.500	8	–	16	.333
Princeton	5	–	7	.417	9	–	14	.391
Harvard	3	–	9	.250	7	–	15	.318
Cornell	3	–	9	.250	5	–	12	.294

1935–36 Eastern Intercollegiate Conference men's basketball standings
	Conf.				Overall
Team	W		L	PCT	W		L	PCT
Carnegie Tech†	7	–	3	.700	8	–	3	.727
Pittsburgh	7	–	3	.700	18	–	9	.667
Temple	6	–	4	.600	18	–	6	.750
West Virginia	6	–	4	.600	16	–	8	.667
Georgetown	4	–	6	.400	7	–	11	.389
Penn State	0	–	10	.000	6	–	11	.353
† Postseason conference championship playoff game winner As of end of 1935-36 season

1935–36 Metropolitan New York Conference men's basketball standings
	Conf.				Overall
Team	W		L	PCT	W		L	PCT
LIU	3	–	0	1.000	25	–	0	1.000
NYU	7	–	1	.875	14	–	4	.778
Manhattan	5	–	1	.833	17	–	3	.850
St. John's	4	–	3	.571	18	–	4	.818
CCNY	3	–	3	.500	10	–	4	.714
St. Francis (NY)	4	–	6	.400	15	–	8	.652
Fordham	2	–	4	.333	10	–	5	.667
Brooklyn	0	–	7	.000	18	–	9	.667

1935–36 Missouri Valley Conference men's basketball standings
	Conf.				Overall
Team	W		L	PCT	W		L	PCT
Creighton	8	–	4	.667	13	–	6	.684
Oklahoma A&M	8	–	4	.667	16	–	8	.667
Drake	8	–	4	.667	16	–	12	.571
Washburn	6	–	4	.600	7	–	14	.333
Grinnell	4	–	6	.400	7	–	11	.389
Washington University	3	–	9	.250	6	–	13	.316
Tulsa	3	–	9	.250	6	–	14	.300

1935–36 Pacific Coast Conference men's basketball standings
	Conf.				Overall
Team	W		L	PCT	W		L	PCT
North
Washington	13	–	3	.813	25	–	7	.781
Oregon State	10	–	6	.625	16	–	9	.640
Washington State	8	–	8	.500	22	–	8	.733
Oregon	7	–	9	.438	20	–	11	.645
Idaho	2	–	14	.125	12	–	15	.444
South
Stanford †	8	–	4	.667	22	–	7	.759
USC	8	–	4	.667	14	–	12	.538
California	6	–	6	.500	13	–	16	.448
UCLA	2	–	10	.167	10	–	13	.435
† Conference playoff series winner

1935–36 Rocky Mountain Conference men's basketball standings
	Conf.				Overall
Team	W		L	PCT	W		L	PCT
Eastern
Wyoming	11	–	3	.786	12	–	7	.632
Northern Colorado	10	–	4	.714	14	–	6	.700
Denver	8	–	4	.667	11	–	5	.688
Colorado College	9	–	5	.643	14	–	9	.609
Western State	5	–	5	.500	13	–	7	.650
Colorado	6	–	8	.429	6	–	8	.429
Colorado State	3	–	9	.250	7	–	9	.438
Colorado Mines	0	–	14	.000	0	–	14	.000
Western
Utah State	9	–	3	.750	17	–	9	.654
BYU	6	–	6	.500	16	–	9	.640
Montana State	5	–	7	.417	11	–	8	.579
Utah	4	–	8	.333	7	–	15	.318

1935–36 Southeastern Conference men's basketball standings
	Conf.				Overall
Team	W		L	PCT	W		L	PCT
Kentucky	6	–	2	.750	15	–	6	.714
Vanderbilt	9	–	4	.692	9	–	14	.391
Tennessee †	8	–	4	.667	15	–	6	.714
Mississippi State	9	–	5	.643	11	–	6	.647
Auburn	7	–	4	.636	10	–	5	.667
Alabama	9	–	6	.600	15	–	9	.625
LSU	9	–	6	.600	10	–	10	.500
Georgia Tech	7	–	5	.583	10	–	8	.556
Ole Miss	7	–	5	.583	11	–	9	.550
Georgia	6	–	7	.462	9	–	11	.450
Florida	2	–	8	.200	5	–	10	.333
Tulane	1	–	14	.067	2	–	17	.105
Sewanee	0	–	10	.000	2	–	13	.133
† Regular-season championship and SEC Tournament winner

1935–36 Southern Conference men's basketball standings
	Conf.				Overall
Team	W		L	PCT	W		L	PCT
Washington and Lee	10	–	1	.909	19	–	2	.905
North Carolina †	13	–	3	.813	21	–	4	.840
North Carolina State	10	–	3	.769	15	–	4	.789
Maryland	4	–	3	.571	14	–	6	.700
Clemson	5	–	5	.500	15	–	7	.682
Duke	4	–	5	.444	20	–	6	.769
Virginia	4	–	8	.333	11	–	13	.458
South Carolina	1	–	6	.143	11	–	8	.579
Virginia Tech	1	–	9	.100	5	–	16	.238
VMI	0	–	10	.000	3	–	14	.176
† Southern Conference Tournament winner

1935–36 Southwest Conference men's basketball standings
	Conf.				Overall
Team	W		L	PCT	W		L	PCT
Arkansas	11	–	1	.917	24	–	3	.889
Texas	8	–	4	.667	15	–	9	.625
Rice	8	–	4	.667	12	–	10	.545
Baylor	6	–	6	.500	12	–	13	.480
SMU	4	–	8	.333	4	–	8	.333
Texas A&M	3	–	9	.250	9	–	9	.500
TCU	2	–	10	.167	3	–	11	.214

=== Major independents ===
A total of 57 college teams played as major independents. Notre Dame (22–2) had the best winning percentage (.917) and Western Kentucky State (26–4) finished with the most wins.

1935–36 NCAA men's basketball independents standings
	Conf.				Overall
Team	W		L	PCT	W		L	PCT
Notre Dame		–		–	22	–	2	.917
Western Kentucky State		–		–	26	–	4	.867
George Washington		–		–	16	–	3	.842
Western State Teachers		–		–	15	–	3	.833
Duquesne		–		–	14	–	3	.824
DePaul		–		–	18	–	4	.818
Indiana State		–		–	11	–	3	.786
St. Bonaventure		–		–	7	–	2	.778
Bucknell		–		–	13	–	4	.765
Colgate		–		–	12	–	4	.750
Furman		–		–	12	–	4	.750
Toledo		–		–	12	–	4	.750
Niagara		–		–	17	–	6	.739
St. Joseph's		–		–	14	–	5	.737
Rhode Island State		–		–	13	–	5	.722
Detroit		–		–	12	–	5	.706
Syracuse		–		–	12	–	5	.706
Richmond		–		–	14	–	6	.700
Loyola (Md.)		–		–	13	–	6	.684
Saint Mary's (Calif.)		–		–	14	–	7	.667
Santa Clara		–		–	12	–	6	.667
Ohio		–		–	13	–	7	.650
William & Mary		–		–	11	–	6	.647
Canisius		–		–	10	–	7	.588
Cincinnati		–		–	10	–	7	.588
Kent State		–		–	10	–	7	.588
The Citadel		–		–	7	–	5	.583
Louisville		–		–	14	–	11	.560
San Francisco		–		–	11	–	9	.550
Montana		–		–	13	–	11	.542
Rutgers		–		–	8	–	7	.533
Xavier		–		–	8	–	7	.533
Miami (Ohio)		–		–	9	–	8	.529
Army		–		–	7	–	7	.500
Brown		–		–	8	–	8	.500
Loyola (Ill.)		–		–	8	–	8	.500
Navy		–		–	7	–	7	.500
Valparaiso		–		–	8	–	8	.500
Wichita Municipal		–		–	12	–	12	.500
Michigan State Normal		–		–	8	–	9	.471
Bowling Green State		–		–	7	–	8	.467
Saint Louis		–		–	9	–	11	.450
Lafayette		–		–	7	–	9	.438
Wake Forest		–		–	9	–	12	.429
Lehigh		–		–	5	–	7	.417
Bradley		–		–	6	–	10	.375
Marshall		–		–	6	–	10	.375
Marquette		–		–	7	–	12	.368
Villanova		–		–	6	–	12	.333
Butler		–		–	6	–	15	.286
Seton Hall		–		–	4	–	11	.267
Muhlenberg		–		–	5	–	16	.238
La Salle		–		–	4	–	13	.235
Connecticut		–		–	3	–	11	.214
Davidson		–		–	4	–	15	.211
Dayton		–		–	3	–	13	.188
Boston University		–		–	1	–	13	.071

== Awards ==
=== Consensus All-American team ===
Consensus Team
Player	Class	Team
Vern Huffman	Senior	Indiana
Robert Kessler	Senior	Purdue
Bill Kinner	Senior	Utah
Hank Luisetti	Sophomore	Stanford
John Moir	Sophomore	Notre Dame
Paul Nowak	Sophomore	Notre Dame
Ike Poole	Senior	Arkansas

=== Major player of the year awards ===
- Helms Player of the Year: John Moir, Notre Dame (retroactive selection in 1944)

=== Other major awards ===
- Haggerty Award (Top player in New York City metro area): Jules Bender, Long Island

== Coaching changes ==
A number of teams changed coaches during the season and after it ended.

Team	Former Coach	Interim Coach	New Coach	Reason
BYU	Eddie Kimball		Fred Dixon	
Connecticut	John Heldman Jr.	J. Orlean Christian	Donald White	Heldman resigned after the first game of the year, he went 19–42 in his career with Connecticut. Christian was named interim and finished with a 3–10 record.
Cornell	Howard Ortner		Bo Rowland	
Dartmouth	Dolly Stark		Osborne Cowles	
DePaul	Jim Kelly		Tom Haggerty	
Florida	Ben Clemons		Josh Cody	
Idaho	Richard Fox		Forrest Twogood	
Illinois	J. Craig Ruby		Douglas R. Mills	
Lafayette	P. M. Shellenberger		Mike Michalske	
Louisville	C. V. Money		Laurie Apitz	
Mississippi State	Frank Carideo		Sanfield Hitt	
Penn State	Earl Leslie		John Lawther	
Saint Louis	Mike Nylkos		Ed Davidson	
Saint Mary's (Calif.)	Jim Underhill		Harlan Dykes	
Seton Hall	John T. Colrick		Honey Russell	
St. Johns (NY)	Buck Freeman		Joe Lapchick	
Texas	Marty Karow		Josh Gray	
Texas State M&M	J. B. Andrews		Marshall Pennington	
Vanderbilt	Josh Cody		Jim Buford	Cody left to coach Florida.
Villanova	George Jacobs		Alexander Severance	
VMI	Frank Summers		Allison Hubert	
