= Minnesota Lake =

Minnesota Lake or Lake Minnesota may refer to a location in the United States:

== Cities, towns, townships etc. ==
- Minnesota Lake, Minnesota, a town in Faribault County
- Minnesota Lake Township, Faribault County, Minnesota

== Lakes ==
- Minnesota Lake (Faribault County, Minnesota)
- Glacial Lake Minnesota
