= George Keogan =

American football, basketball, and baseball coach

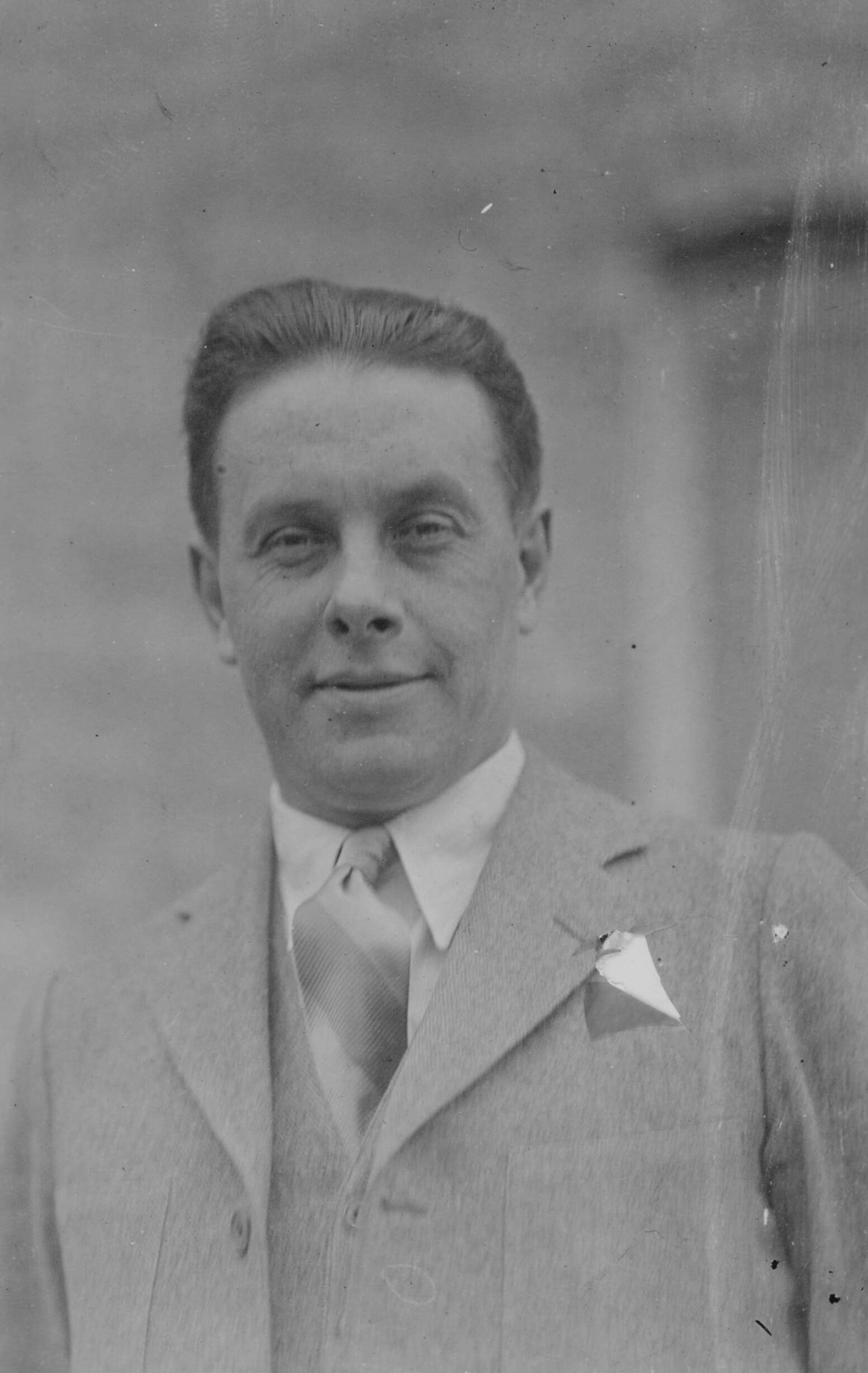

Biographical details
- Born: March 8, 1890; Minnesota Lake, Minnesota, U.S.
- Died: February 17, 1943 (aged 52); South Bend, Indiana, U.S.

Coaching career (HC unless noted)

Basketball
- 1912–1914: Superior Normal
- 1915–1916: Saint Louis
- 1917–1918: St. Thomas (MN)
- 1918–1919: Allegheny
- 1919–1922: Valparaiso
- 1923–1943: Notre Dame

Football
- 1914–1915: Saint Louis
- 1917: St. Thomas (MN)
- 1919–1920: Valparaiso
- 1924: Notre Dame (freshmen)

Baseball
- 1920–1921: Valparaiso
- 1924–1926: Notre Dame
- 1930–1933: Notre Dame

Head coaching record
- Overall: 414–127–3 (basketball); 23–16–1 (football); 81–66–3 (baseball)
- Basketball Hall of Fame; Inducted in 1961 (profile)
- College Basketball Hall of Fame; Inducted in 2006

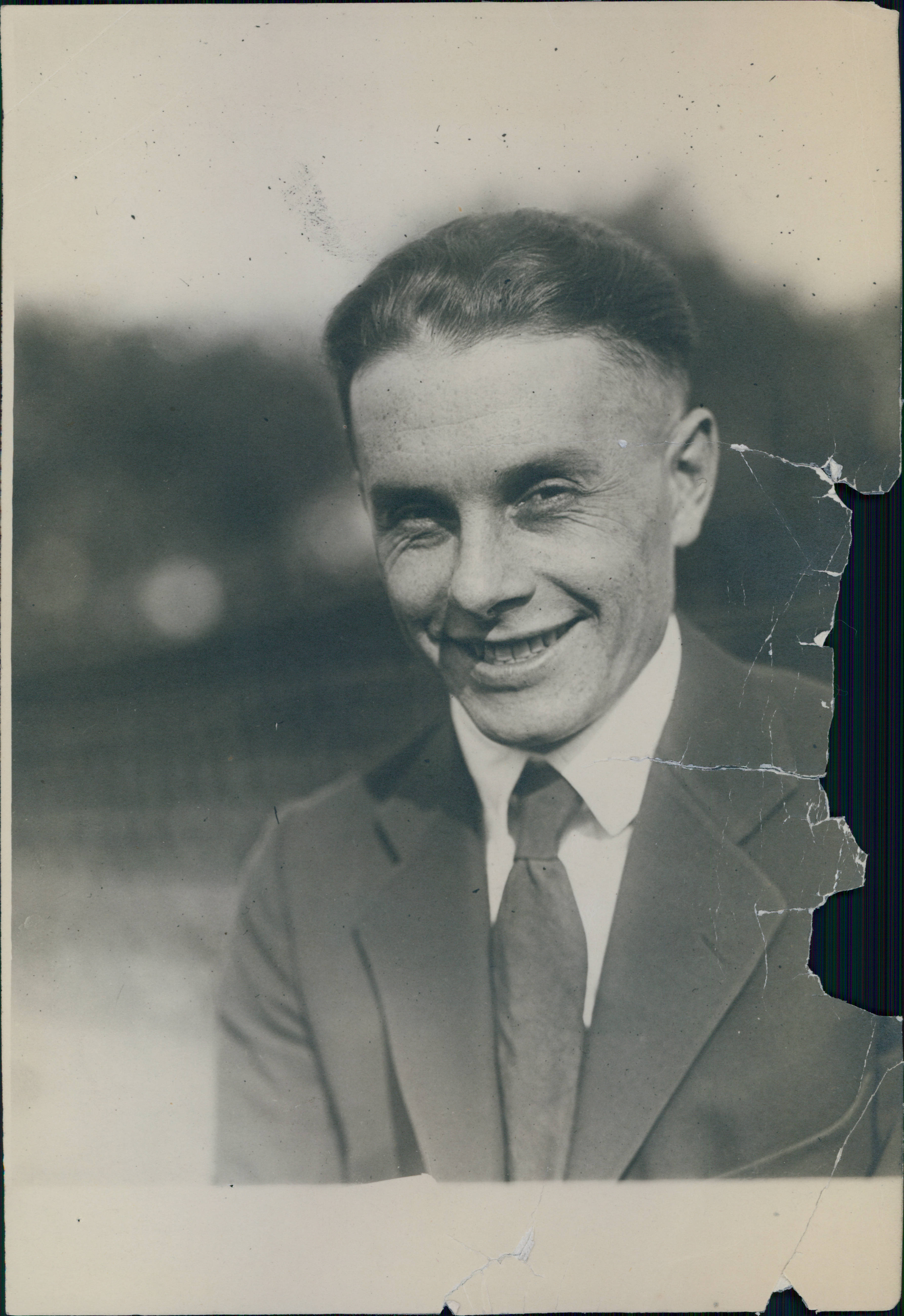
George E. Keogan

George E. Keogan (March 8, 1890 – February 17, 1943) was an American football, basketball, and baseball coach, most known for coaching basketball at the University of Notre Dame from 1923 to 1943. Keogan never had a losing season in his 20 years at Notre Dame.

The Minnesota Lake, Minnesota native attended University of Minnesota from 1909 to 1913. He began coaching high school varsities after his freshman year in college, guiding first Lockport High School (1910–1911) followed by Riverside High School (1911–1912). Meanwhile, he was also coaching several college basketball teams: Charles City College in Iowa (1909–1910), Superior State Teachers College in Wisconsin (1912–1914), Saint Louis University (1914–15) and the University of St. Thomas in St. Paul, Minnesota (1917–1918). During World War I he served at Great Lakes Naval Training Station. After briefly coaching Allegheny College in Meadville, Pennsylvania (1919–1920) and Valparaiso, Keogan arrived at University of Notre Dame. He served as head basketball and baseball coach, as well as assistant to the legendary football coach Knute Rockne. Keogan compiled a 327–96–1 at Notre Dame.

Keogan died on February 17, 1943, of a heart attack at his home in South Bend, Indiana. After his death, Moose Krause took over his job as Notre Dame's head basketball coach. Keogan was inducted into the Naismith Memorial Basketball Hall of Fame in 1961 and the National Collegiate Basketball Hall of Fame in 2006.

== Head coaching record ==
=== Football ===
Year	Team	Overall	Conference	Standing	Bowl/playoffs
Saint Louis Billikens (Independent) (1914–1915)
1914	Saint Louis	4–4			
1915	Saint Louis	5–4–1			
Saint Louis:		9–8–1			
St. Thomas Cadets (Independent) (1917)
1917	St. Thomas	4–2			
St. Thomas:		4–2			
Valparaiso Crusaders (Independent) (1919–1920)
1919	Valparaiso	5–3			
1920	Valparaiso	5–3			
Valparaiso:		10–6			
Total:		23–16–1			

=== Basketball ===
Record table
Season	Team	Overall	Conference	Standing	Postseason
Saint Louis Billikens (Independent) (1914–1916)
1914–15	Saint Louis	9–6			
1915–16	Saint Louis	13–6			
Saint Louis:		22–12 (.647)			
Valparaiso Crusaders (Independent) (1919–1921)
1919–20	Valparaiso	12–8			
1920–21	Valparaiso	19–5			
Valparaiso:		31–13 (.705)			
Notre Dame Fighting Irish (Independent) (1923–1943)
1923–24	Notre Dame	15–8			
1924–25	Notre Dame	11–11			
1925–26	Notre Dame	19–1			
1926–27	Notre Dame	19–1			Helms National Champion
1927–28	Notre Dame	18–4			
1928–29	Notre Dame	15–5			
1929–30	Notre Dame	14–6			
1930–31	Notre Dame	12–8			
1931–32	Notre Dame	18–2			
1932–33	Notre Dame	16–6			
1933–34	Notre Dame	20–4			
1934–35	Notre Dame	13–9			
1935–36	Notre Dame	22–2			Helms National Champion
1936–37	Notre Dame	20–3			
1937–38	Notre Dame	20–3			
1938–39	Notre Dame	15–6			
1939–40	Notre Dame	15–6			
1940–41	Notre Dame	17–5			
1941–42	Notre Dame	16–6			
1942–43	Notre Dame	18–2			
Notre Dame:		333–98 (.773)			
Total:		386-123 (.758)			
National champion Postseason invitational champion Conference regular season champion Conference regular season and conference tournament champion Division regular season champion Division regular season and conference tournament champion Conference tournament champion
