= 1935–36 Notre Dame Fighting Irish men's basketball team =

American college basketball season

1935–36 Notre Dame Fighting Irish men's basketball

Helms Foundation National Champions
- Conference: Independent
- Record: 22–2–1
- Head coach: George Keogan (13th season)
- Captains: Martin Peters; John Ford
- Home arena: Notre Dame Fieldhouse

The 1935–36 Notre Dame Fighting Irish men's basketball team represented the University of Notre Dame during the 1935–36 NCAA men's basketball season in the United States. The head coach was George Keogan, coaching in his 13th season with the Fighting Irish. The team finished the season with a 22–2–1 record (their only tie in program history) and were named national champions by the Helms Athletic Foundation. Players John Moir and Paul Nowak were named consensus All-Americans at the end of the season as well.

== Schedule and results ==
Date time, TV	Rank^{#}	Opponent^{#}	Result	Record	Site city, state
Regular season
11/30/1935*		Albion	W 62–26	1–0	Notre Dame Fieldhouse; South Bend, IN
12/4/1935*		Saint Mary's (MN)	W 45–22	2–0	Notre Dame Fieldhouse; South Bend, IN
12/4/1935*		Kalamazoo	W 65–17	3–0	Notre Dame Fieldhouse; South Bend, IN
12/7/1935*		Millikin	W 58–30	4–0	Studebaker Gymnasium; South Bend, IN
12/7/1935*		Saint Joseph's (IN)	W 71–22	5–0	Studebaker Gymnasium; South Bend, IN
12/11/1935*		at Washington University	W 35–27	6–0	Francis Gymnasium; St. Louis, MO
12/16/1935*		Northwestern	W 40–29	7–0	Notre Dame Fieldhouse; South Bend, IN
12/23/1935*		at Purdue	L 40–54	7–1	Lafayette Jefferson High School Gymnasium; West Lafayette, IN
12/31/1935*		at Northwestern	T 20–20	7–1–1	Old Patten Gymnasium; Evanston, IL
1/4/1936*		at Minnesota	W 29–27	8–1–1	Williams Arena; Minneapolis, MN
1/10/1936*		at Pittsburgh	W 43–35	9–1–1	Pitt Pavilion; Pittsburgh, PA
1/14/1936*		Marquette	W 37–22	10–1–1	Notre Dame Fieldhouse; South Bend, IN
1/18/1936*		at Penn	W 37–27	11–1–1	Palestra; Philadelphia, PA
1/20/1936*		at Syracuse	W 46–43	12–1–1	Archbold Gymnasium; Syracuse, NY
1/25/1936*		Butler	W 35–27	13–1–1	Notre Dame Fieldhouse; South Bend, IN
2/1/1936*		Saint Benedict	W 53–17	14–1–1	Notre Dame Fieldhouse; South Bend, IN
2/5/1936*		Illinois	W 33–23	15–1–1	Notre Dame Fieldhouse; South Bend, IN
2/10/1936*		Kentucky	W 41–20	16–1–1	Notre Dame Fieldhouse; South Bend, IN
2/14/1936*		vs. NYU	W 38–27	17–1–1	Madison Square Garden; New York, NY
2/22/1936*		Pittsburgh	W 43–27	18–1–1	Notre Dame Fieldhouse; South Bend, IN
2/25/1936*		Minnesota	W 37–15	19–1–1	Notre Dame Fieldhouse; South Bend, IN
2/29/1936*		at Butler	W 34–30	20–1–1	Butler Fieldhouse; Indianapolis, IN
3/4/1936*		Ohio State	L 23–28	20–2–1	Notre Dame Fieldhouse; South Bend, IN
3/7/1936*		at Marquette	W 37–34	21–2–1	Old Gym; Milwaukee, WI
3/10/1936*		at Detroit	W 51–28	22–2–1	Detroit, MI
*Non-conference game. ^{#}Rankings from AP Poll. (#) Tournament seedings in parentheses.
