= 1936 NCAA Men's Basketball All-Americans =

- Awarded for: 1935–36 NCAA men's basketball season

The consensus 1936 College Basketball All-American team, as determined by aggregating the results of three major All-American teams. To earn "consensus" status, a player must win honors from a majority of the following teams: the Helms Athletic Foundation, Converse and College Humor Magazine.

== 1936 consensus All-America team ==
Consensus Team
Player	Class	Team
Vern Huffman	Senior	Indiana
Robert Kessler	Senior	Purdue
Bill Kinner	Senior	Utah
Hank Luisetti	Sophomore	Stanford
John Moir	Sophomore	Notre Dame
Paul Nowak	Sophomore	Notre Dame
Ike Poole	Senior	Arkansas

== Individual All-America teams ==
All-America Team
All-America Team	First team		Second team		Third team	
All-America Team	Player	School	Player	School	Player	School
Helms	Bob Egge	Washington	No second or third teams			
Helms	Vern Huffman	Indiana	No second or third teams			
Helms	Norman Iler	Washington and Lee	No second or third teams			
Helms	Robert Kessler	Purdue	No second or third teams			
Helms	Bill Kinner	Utah	No second or third teams			
Helms	Hank Luisetti	Stanford	No second or third teams			
Helms	John Moir	Notre Dame	No second or third teams			
Helms	Bill Nash	Columbia	No second or third teams			
Helms	Paul Nowak	Notre Dame	No second or third teams			
Helms	Ike Poole	Arkansas	No second or third teams			
Converse	Vern Huffman	Indiana	Harry Anderson	Tennessee	William Fleishman	Case Reserve
Converse	Robert Kessler	Purdue	Ralph Bishop	Washington	Kent Ryan	Utah State
Converse	Hank Luisetti	Stanford	Bill Haarlow	Chicago	Edgar Sonderman	Syracuse
Converse	Paul Nowak	Notre Dame	John Moir	Notre Dame	Chuck Wagner	Washington
Converse	Wally Palmberg	Oregon State	Ike Poole	Arkansas	George Wahlquist	Nebraska
College Humor	Herb Bonn	Duquesne	Bill Haarlow	Chicago	No third team	
College Humor	Ray Ebling	Kansas	Bob Herwig	California	No third team	
College Humor	Robert Kessler	Purdue	Bill Kinner	Utah	No third team	
College Humor	Paul Nowak	Notre Dame	Ben Kramer	Long Island	No third team	
College Humor	Milton Schulman	NYU	Walt Miller	Duquesne	No third team	

== See also ==
- 1935–36 NCAA men's basketball season
