= 1935–36 Kansas Jayhawks men's basketball team =

American college basketball season

1935–36 Kansas Jayhawks men's basketball

Big Six Champions
- Conference: Big Six Conference
- Record: 21–2 (10–0 Big 6)
- Head coach: Phog Allen (19th season)
- Captain: Ray Ebling
- Home arena: Hoch Auditorium

1935–36 Big Six Conference men's basketball standings
	Conf.				Overall
Team	W		L	PCT	W		L	PCT
Kansas	10	–	0	1.000	21	–	2	.913
Nebraska	7	–	3	.700	13	–	8	.619
Oklahoma	5	–	5	.500	9	–	8	.529
Iowa State	3	–	7	.300	8	–	8	.500
Kansas State	3	–	7	.300	9	–	9	.500
Missouri	2	–	8	.200	5	–	12	.294

The 1935–36 Kansas Jayhawks men's basketball team represented the University of Kansas during the 1935–36 college men's basketball season.

== Roster ==
- Marvin Cox
- Roy Holliday
- Fred Pralle
- Ray Ebling
- Lester Kappelman
- Raymond Noble
- Wilmer Shaffer
- Paul Rogers
- Robert Holmer
- Milton Allen

== Schedule ==
Date time, TV	Rank^{#}	Opponent^{#}	Result	Record	Site city, state
December 9*		Washburn	W 35–18	1-0	Hoch Auditorium; Lawrence, KS
December 12*		Ottawa	W 53–22	2-0	Hoch Auditorium; Lawrence, KS
December 16*		Baker	W 34–32	3-0	Hoch Auditoriium; Lawrence, KS
December 20*		vs. USC	W 34–31	4-0	Municipal Auditorium; Kansas City, MO
December 21		vs. Kansas State; Sunflower Showdown	W 38–23	5-0	Municipal Auditorium; Kansas City, MO
January 2*		vs. California	W 32–28	6-0	Municipal Auditorium; Kansas City, MO
January 3*		vs. California	W 27–18	7-0	Municipal Auditorium; Kansas City, MO
January 7		at Kansas State; Sunflower Showdown	W 28–17	8-0 (1-0)	Nichols Hall; Manhattan, KS
January 11		Iowa State	W 38–17	9-0 (2-0)	Hoch Auditorium; Lawrence, KS
January 15		at Missouri; Border War	W 29–25	10-0 (3-0)	Brewer Fieldhouse; Columbia, MO
January 20		Nebraska	W 45–23	11-0 (4-0)	Hoch Auditorium; Lawrence, KS
February 4		at Iowa State	W 42–25	12-0 (5-0)	State Gymnasium; Ames, IA
February 5		at Oklahoma	W 43–36	13-0 (6-0)	Field House; Norman, OK
February 15		Kansas State; Sunflower Showdown	W 52–34	14-0 (7-0)	Hoch Auditorium; Lawrence, KS
February 19*		at Washburn	W 51–26	15-0	Topeka, KS
February 28		at Nebraska	W 43–36	16-0 (8-0)	Nebraska Coliseum; Lincoln, NE
March 3		Oklahoma	W 51–26	17-0 (9-0)	Hoch Auditorium; Lawrence, KS
March 6		Missouri; Border War	W 51–29	18-0 (10-0)	Hoch Auditorium; Lawrence, KS
March 13*		vs. Washburn; Olympic Playoffs	W 33–30	19-0	Municipal Auditorium; Kansas City, MO
March 14*		vs. Oklahoma A&M; Olympic Playoffs	W 34–28	20-0	Municipal Auditorium; Kansas City, MO
March 25*		vs. Utah State; Olympic Playoffs	W 39–37	21-0	Municipal Auditorium; Kansas City, MO
March 26*		vs. Utah State; Olympic Playoffs	L 37–42	21-1	Municipal Auditorium; Kansas City, MO
March 28*		vs. Utah State; Olympic Playoffs	L 31–50	21-2	Municipal Auditorium; Kansas City, MO
*Non-conference game. ^{#}Rankings from AP Poll. (#) Tournament seedings in parentheses.
