= 1935–36 Iowa State Cyclones men's basketball team =

American college basketball season

1935–36 Iowa State Cyclones men's basketball
- Conference: Big Six Conference
- Record: 8–8 (3–7 Big Six)
- Head coach: Louis Menze (8th season)
- Home arena: State Gymnasium

1935–36 Big Six Conference men's basketball standings
	Conf.				Overall
Team	W		L	PCT	W		L	PCT
Kansas	10	–	0	1.000	21	–	2	.913
Nebraska	7	–	3	.700	13	–	8	.619
Oklahoma	5	–	5	.500	9	–	8	.529
Iowa State	3	–	7	.300	8	–	8	.500
Kansas State	3	–	7	.300	9	–	9	.500
Missouri	2	–	8	.200	5	–	12	.294

The 1935–36 Iowa State Cyclones men's basketball team represented Iowa State University during the 1935–36 NCAA men's basketball season. The Cyclones were coached by Louis Menze, who was in his eighth season with the Cyclones. They played their home games at the State Gymnasium in Ames, Iowa.

They finished the season 8–8, 3–7 in Big Six play to finish in a tie for fourth place.

== Roster ==
1935–36 Iowa State Cyclones men's basketball team
Players
Coaches

Pos.	#	Name	Height	Weight	Year	Hometown
		Harlan Anderson	—	—	Jr	Cannon Falls, Minnesota
F		Bob Blahnik	—	—	So	Cedar Rapids, Iowa
		Weldon Brown	—	—	Jr	Boone, Iowa
		Donald Clarke	—	—	So	Alta, Iowa
F	7	Jack Cowen	—	—	Sr
F	6	Jack Flemming	—	—	Jr	Spirit Lake, Iowa
		George Gibson	—	—	So	Kansas City, Missouri
G	3	Torvald Holmes (C)	—	—	Sr
F		Maurice Johnson	—	—	So	Le Grand, Iowa
C		Allen Kilborn	6 ft 6 in (1.98 m)	—	Jr	Ames, Iowa
		Joseph Loufek	—	—	So	Cedar Rapids, Iowa
		Richard McWilliams	—	—	So	Lehigh, Iowa
		James Munday	—	—	So	Atlantic City, New Jersey
		Newman Olsgaard	—	—	So	Kindred, North Dakota
		William Partridge	—	—	So	Harmon, South Dakota
G		Don Perkins	—	—	Jr	Des Moines, Iowa
		Clarence Rogers	—	—	So	Ames, Iowa
C	13	Burton Thomson	6 ft 5 in (1.96 m)	—	Jr	Boone, Iowa

Head coach

- Louis Menze

Assistant coach(es)

Legend

- (C) Team captain
- (S) Suspended
- (I) Ineligible
- (W) Walk-on
- Injured
- Current redshirt

== Schedule and results ==
Date time, TV	Rank^{#}	Opponent^{#}	Result	Record	Site city, state
Regular season
December 6, 1935*		Simpson	W 37–14	1–0	State Gymnasium; Ames, Iowa
December 9, 1935*		Cornell	W 34–21	2–0	State Gymnasium; Ames, Iowa
December 13, 1935*		Grinnell	W 36–22	3–0	State Gymnasium; Ames, Iowa
January 1, 1936*; 7:30 pm		Vanderbilt	W 38–28	4–0	State Gymnasium; Ames, Iowa
January 6, 1936*; 8:15 pm		at Drake; Iowa Big Four	L 23–24	4–1	Drake Fieldhouse; Des Moines, Iowa
January 11, 1936		at Kansas	L 17–38	4–2 (0–1)	Hoch Auditorium; Lawrence, Kansas
January 13, 1936		at Oklahoma	L 19–25	4–3 (0–2)	OU Field House; Norman, Oklahoma
January 18, 1936		Kansas State	W 31–29	5–3 (1–2)	State Gymnasium; Ames, Iowa
January 25, 1936		Nebraska	W 41–40 ^{OT}	6–3 (2–2)	State Gymnasium; Ames, Iowa
January 31, 1936; 7:30 pm		Missouri	L 29–33	6–4 (2–3)	State Gymnasium; Ames, Iowa
February 4, 1936; 7:15 pm		Kansas	L 25–42	6–5 (2–4)	State Gymnasium; Ames, Iowa
February 15, 1936		at Nebraska	L 20–49	6–6 (2–5)	Nebraska Coliseum; Lincoln, Nebraska
February 17, 1936		at Kansas State	L 25–41	6–7 (2–6)	Nichols Hall; Manhattan, Kansas
February 22, 1936		Oklahoma	L 39–42	6–8 (2–7)	State Gymnasium; Ames, Iowa
February 26, 1936*; 7:15 pm		Drake; Iowa Big Four	W 37–29	7–8	State Gymnasium; Ames, Iowa
March 4, 1936		at Missouri	W 31–29 ^{OT}	8–8 (3–7)	Brewer Fieldhouse; Columbia, Missouri
*Non-conference game. ^{#}Rankings from AP poll. (#) Tournament seedings in parentheses. All times are in Central Time.
