= Peter Kremer House =

Historic house in Minnesota, United States

- U.S. National Register of Historic Places
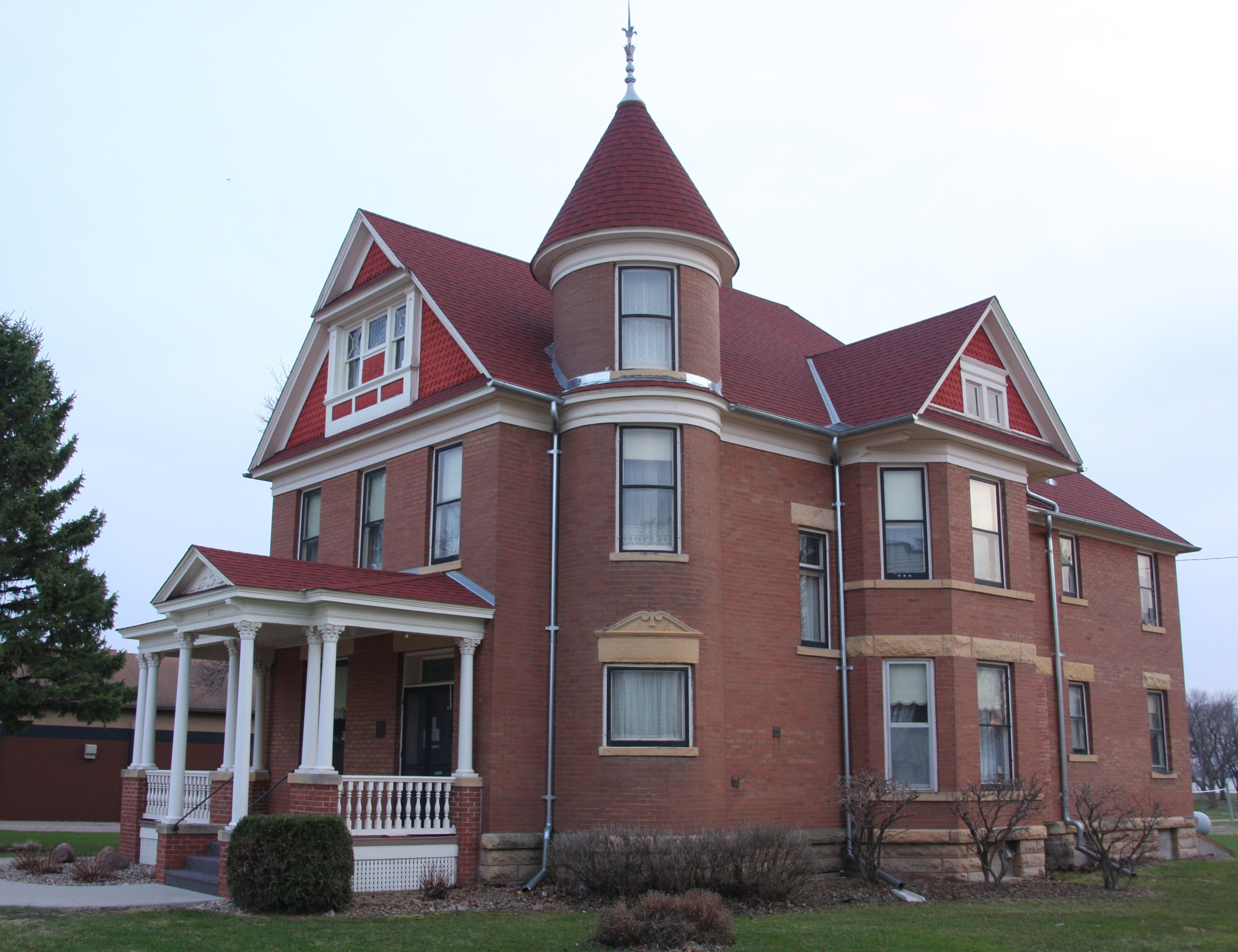
- Exterior of house

- Location within Minnesota Location within the United States
- Location: 317 North Main Street, Minnesota Lake, Minnesota
- Coordinates: 43°50′34″N 93°49′58″W
- Area: Approximately 1 acre
- Built: 1902
- Architectural style: Queen Anne
- NRHP reference No.: 80004260

The Peter Kremer House is a historic house museum in Minnesota Lake, Minnesota, United States. The Minnesota Lake Historical Society operates the house as the Kremer House Library and Museum.

Built in 1902, the Queen Anne-style residence was the home of a French immigrant and his wife, Millie Zabel of Prussia, who both served as business and civic leaders in the community.

== History ==
The house was originally owned by Peter Kremer and his wife, Millie. Peter Kremer, born in France, moved to the Danville Township and Minnesota Lake area in 1865. His family were some of the earliest settlers in the town with his brothers, Nicholas J., John, and John P., having arrived previously in 1956. He was instrumental in developing several local businesses, including a flour mill, stockyards, a cooperative creamery, and Security State Bank. Kremer also held the position of mayor for 30 years and served as town marshal and school treasurer.

Millie Zabel Kremer, born in Prussian Germany, married Peter Kremer in 1893. Following her early years in the mercantile business in Minnesota Lake, she managed their extensive property and Peter's business interests after his death in December 1913.

== Architecture ==
The interior features an open staircase, windows with curved and stained glass, a fireplace, and large pocket doors. The wood floors throughout the house are original. The main floor showcases chinaware used by the Kremers, while the master suite and additional rooms for guests, a maid, and a housekeeper are located upstairs. A steep stairway at the back served the family's hired help.

== Library and Museum ==
The first floor of Kremer House serves as the Minnesota Lake Library, which is open to the public. The upstairs functions as a history center, with resources on local families. Exhibits within the museum rotate regularly, featuring various artifacts related to the history of Minnesota Lake.

On permanent exhibit is a one-tenth scale replica of a windmill built by Donald Kain, Godfried Schostag's great-grandson and a centennial quilt, created in 1966 to commemorate 100 years since the town's renaming to Minnesota Lake.

== See also ==
- National Register of Historic Places listings in Faribault County, Minnesota
