= Ralph Bishop =

American basketball player

Personal information
- Born: October 1, 1915 Brooklyn, New York, U.S.
- Died: October 1, 1974 (aged 59) Santa Clara, California, U.S.
- Listed height: 6 ft 3 in (1.91 m)
- Listed weight: 185 lb (84 kg)

Career information
- High school: Yakima (Yakima, Washington)
- College: Yakima Valley CC (1932–1933); Washington (1933–1936)
- NBA draft: 1947: – round, –
- Drafted by: Chicago Stags
- Position: Forward

Career history

Playing
- 1948–1949: Denver Nuggets

Coaching
- 1948–1949: Denver Nuggets

Career highlights
- Second-team All-American – Converse (1936); First-team All-PCC (1936)
- Stats at Basketball Reference
Medals
Representing United States
Men's basketball
Olympic Games
Gold medal – first place	1936 Berlin	Team competition

Ralph English Bishop (October 1, 1915 – October 1, 1974) was an American basketball player who competed in the 1936 Summer Olympics.

He was part of the American basketball team that won the gold medal. He played three matches including the final.

Bishop later played professionally for the Denver Nuggets of the National Basketball League, a forerunner to the National Basketball Association. He averaged 1.8 points per game during the 1948–1949 season.

He played college basketball for the Washington Huskies in Seattle, Washington.
