= Herb Bonn =

American basketball player

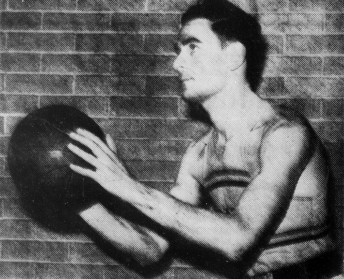
- Bonn, circa 1938

Personal information
- Born: January 14, 1916 Aliquippa, Pennsylvania, U.S.
- Died: April 7, 1943 (aged 27) South Pacific Ocean, off Oahu, Territory of Hawaii
- Listed height: 6 ft 0 in (1.83 m)
- Listed weight: 195 lb (88 kg)

Career information
- High school: Taylor Allderdice; (Pittsburgh, Pennsylvania)
- College: Duquesne (1935–1937)
- Position: Forward

Career history
- 1937–1939: Pittsburgh Pirates

Career highlights
- First-team All-American – College Humor (1936)

Herbert Sidney Bonn (January 14, 1916 – April 7, 1943) was an American professional basketball player and World War II fighter pilot. After a college career at Duquesne University in which he was a first-team All-American in 1935–36, Bonn played in the National Basketball League for the Pittsburgh Pirates between 1937 and 1939. In his 15-game NBL career, Bonn averaged 5.7 points per game. He fought in World War II in the United States Navy and was killed in action in a crash off Hawaii.

== Military career and death ==
On April 7, 1943, Bonn took off from Kanoehe Airfield on Oahu in a B-24 Liberator with a crew of ten. Whilst conducting a night navigation operation, Bonn's aircraft crashed into the South Pacific Ocean. When the Liberator did not return, all 10 on board were listed missing in action, presumed dead. Bonn and his crew have no known grave, and they are memorialized at the Punchbowl Cemetery.

== Career statistics ==
Legend
GP	Games played	FGM	Field goals made
FTM	Free throws made	FTA	Free throws attempted
FT%	Free throw percentage	PTS	Total points
PPG	Points per game	**Bold**	Career high

=== NBL ===
==== Regular season ====
Year	Team	GP	FGM	FTM	PTS	PPG
1937–38	Pittsburgh	**8**	**24**	**10**	**58**	**7.3**
1938–39	Pittsburgh	7	12	4	28	4.0
Career		15	36	14	86	5.7
