= Bill Kinner =

American basketball player

Personal information
- Born: June 13, 1914 Colorado
- Died: July 5, 1997 (aged 83) Utah
- Listed height: 6 ft 3 in (1.91 m)

Career information
- High school: Ogden (Ogden, Utah)
- College: Utah (1931–1936)
- Position: Center

Career highlights
- 4× All-RMAC; Consensus All-American (1936); Third-team All-American – Converse (1935)

William J. Kinner (June 13, 1914 – July 5, 1997) was an American basketball player who starred at the University of Utah in the 1930s. He was a 6 ft 3 in (1.91 m) center who played between 1931–32 and 1935–36. Kinner was selected to the All-Rocky Mountain Athletic Conference all four seasons, and he scored over 1,000 career points for the Utes. As a junior in 1934–35, Converse named him to their All-America Third Team, and as a senior the following year, Kinner was voted as a consensus All-American.

In 1997, Kinner was inducted into the University of Utah Athletics Hall of Fame. Then in 2008, fans voted him as one of the best 16 players in school history, which honored him as part of Utah's "All-Century" team.
