= 1935–36 Duke Blue Devils men's basketball team =

American college basketball season

1935–36 Duke Blue Devils men's basketball
- Conference: Southern Conference
- Record: 20–6 (4–5 Southern)
- Head coach: Eddie Cameron
- Home arena: Card Gymnasium

1935–36 Southern Conference men's basketball standings
	Conf.				Overall
Team	W		L	PCT	W		L	PCT
Washington and Lee	10	–	1	.909	19	–	2	.905
North Carolina †	13	–	3	.813	21	–	4	.840
North Carolina State	10	–	3	.769	15	–	4	.789
Maryland	4	–	3	.571	14	–	6	.700
Clemson	5	–	5	.500	15	–	7	.682
Duke	4	–	5	.444	20	–	6	.769
Virginia	4	–	8	.333	11	–	13	.458
South Carolina	1	–	6	.143	11	–	8	.579
Virginia Tech	1	–	9	.100	5	–	16	.238
VMI	0	–	10	.000	3	–	14	.176
† Southern Conference Tournament winner

The 1935–36 Duke Blue Devils men's basketball team represented Duke University during the 1935–36 men's college basketball season. The head coach was Eddie Cameron, coaching his eighth season with the Blue Devils. The team finished with an overall record of 20–6.
