= 1935–36 Illinois Fighting Illini men's basketball team =

American college basketball season

1935–36 Illinois Fighting Illini men's basketball
- Conference: Big Ten Conference
- Record: 13–6 (7–5 Big Ten)
- Head coach: J. Craig Ruby (14th season)
- Assistant coach: Wally Roettger (1st season)
- Captain: Howard Braun
- Home arena: Huff Hall

1935–36 Big Ten Conference men's basketball standings
	Conf.				Overall
Team	W		L	PCT	W		L	PCT
Indiana	11	–	1	.917	18	–	2	.900
Purdue	11	–	1	.917	16	–	4	.800
Michigan	7	–	5	.583	15	–	5	.750
Illinois	7	–	5	.583	13	–	6	.684
Northwestern	7	–	5	.583	13	–	6	.684
Ohio State	5	–	7	.417	12	–	8	.600
Iowa	5	–	7	.417	9	–	10	.474
Wisconsin	4	–	8	.333	11	–	9	.550
Minnesota	3	–	9	.250	7	–	17	.292
Chicago	0	–	12	.000	6	–	14	.300

The 1935–36 Illinois Fighting Illini men's basketball team represented the University of Illinois.

== Regular season ==
The 1935–36 season would turn out to be Craig Ruby's 14th and final year of coaching at the University of Illinois. It would also turn out to be Ruby's final head coaching job anywhere as he would leave to pursue a career with Hallmark Greeting Cards. Ruby's tenure at Illinois ranks 3rd behind Lou Henson (21 years) and Harry Combes (20 years). His 148 wins also ranks 5th behind Henson (423) Combes (316) and Bruce Weber (210) and Doug Mills (151). Along with future head coach Harry Combes, the Illini returned 10 lettermen from a team that had finished in first place in the Big Ten the year before. Unfortunately for the Illini, they lost 3 conference games at home and finished with a record of 7 wins and 5 losses. The team finished the season with an overall record of 13 wins 6 losses. The starting lineup included captain Howard Braun and Wilbur Henry at guard, Harry Combes, Harold Benham and James Vopicka at forward, with Robert Riegel at the center position.

=== Roster ===
1935–36 Illinois Fighting Illini men's basketball team
Players
Coaches

Pos.	#	Name	Height	Weight	Year	Hometown
F	3	Duane Cullinan	—	—	Jr	Pekin, Illinois
C	4	Robert Riegel	—	—	Jr	Tolono, Illinois
G	5	Howard Braun (C)	—	—	Sr	Champaign, Illinois
G	6	Wilbur Henry	—	—	Jr	North Hollywood, California
G	7	James Vopicka	—	—	Jr	Berwyn, Illinois
F	8	Harold Benham	—	—	Sr	Downers Grove, Illinois
G	9	Lowell Spurgeon	—	—	So	Rockford, Illinois
F	10	Harold Swanson	—	—	Jr	Chicago Heights, Illinois
F	11	Byron Blout	—	—	Jr	Salinas, California
C	12	Martin Markworth	—	—	Sr	Cleveland, Ohio
G	13	Lester Lindberg	—	—	Sr	Lockport, Illinois
G	14	Russell Layer	—	—	So	Richmond Heights, Missouri
G	15	Paul W. Gibbs	—	—	Sr	Los Angeles, California
G	17	Harry Combes	—	—	Jr	Champaign, Illinois
G	18	Stanley Bergbom	—	—	So	Barrington, Illinois
F	19	William Bennis	—	—	So	Freeport, Illinois
F	20	William Gates	—	—	Sr	Rockford, Illinois
G	25	Harry Van Hook	—	—	So	Mt. Pulaski, Illinois
G	28	Edward Yeaton	—	—	So	Elkhorn, Wisconsin
F	29	Howard Gasaway	—	—	So	Liberal, Kansas

Head coach

- Craig Ruby (University of Missouri) (14th year)

Assistant coach(es)

- Wally Roettger (University of Illinois) (1st year)

Legend

- (C) Team captain
- (S) Suspended
- (I) Ineligible
- (W) Walk-on
- Injured
- Current redshirt

Roster

== Schedule ==
Date time, TV	Rank^{#}	Opponent^{#}	Result	Record	Site (attendance) city, state
Non-Conference regular season
12/7/1935*		St. Louis	W 35–27	1–0	Huff Hall (4,960); Champaign, IL
12/11/1935*		Wabash	W 40–22	2–0	Huff Hall (4,804); Champaign, IL
12/17/1935*		DePauw	W 47–14	3–0	Huff Hall (5,000); Champaign, IL
12/20/1935*		at DePaul	W 26–24	4–0	Chicago Stadium (6,000); Chicago, IL
12/28/1935*		at Knox College	W 48–31	5–0	Auxiliary Gymnasium (1,500); Galesburg, IL
12/30/1935*		California	W 42–17	6–0	Huff Hall (3,000); Champaign, IL
Big Ten regular season
1/4/1936		at Iowa; Rivalry	L 26–27	6–1 (0–1)	Iowa Field House (–); Iowa City, IA
1/6/1936		at Minnesota	W 42–19	7–1 (1–1)	Williams Arena (–); Minneapolis, MN
1/11/1936		at Wisconsin	W 29–27	8–1 (2–1)	Wisconsin Field House (7,500); Madison, WI
1/13/1936		Ohio State	L 13–18	8–2 (2–2)	Huff Hall (5,500); Champaign, IL
1/18/1936		Northwestern; Rivalry	L 28–40	8–3 (2–3)	Huff Hall (4,500); Champaign, IL
2/5/1936*		at Notre Dame	L 23–33	8–4	Notre Dame Fieldhouse (–); Notre Dame, IN
2/10/1936		Iowa; Rivalry	W 36–14	9–4 (3–3)	Huff Hall (4,000); Champaign, IL
2/15/1936		Wisconsin	W 36–20	10–4 (4–3)	Huff Hall (4,500); Champaign, IL
2/17/1936		at Northwestern; Rivalry	W 39–38	11–4 (5–3)	Patten Gymnasium (–); Evanston, IL
2/22/1936		Minnesota	W 35–33	12–4 (6–3)	Huff Hall (4,500); Champaign, IL
2/24/1936		Michigan	L 37–42	12–5 (6–4)	Huff Hall (5,500); Champaign, IL
2/29/1936		at Ohio State	W 30–20	13–5 (7–4)	Ohio Expo Center Coliseum (5,500); Columbus, OH
3/2/1936		at Michigan	L 22–35	13–6 (7–5)	Yost Field House (–); Ann Arbor, MI
*Non-conference game. ^{#}Rankings from AP Poll. (#) Tournament seedings in parentheses. All times are in Central Time.
