= Robert Kessler =

American basketball player

Personal information
- Born: November 25, 1914 Anderson, Indiana, U.S.
- Died: September 5, 2001 (aged 86)

Career information
- High school: Anderson (Anderson, Indiana)
- College: Purdue (1933–1936)
- Playing career: 1937–1940
- Position: Forward
- Number: 23

Career history
- 1937–1938: Indianapolis Kautskys
- 1938–1939: Hammond Ciesar All-Americans

Career highlights
- All-NBL Second Team (1938); NBL Rookie of the Year (1938); Consensus All-American (1936); 2× First-team All-Big Ten (1935, 1936)

Robert Louis Kessler (November 25, 1914 – September 5, 2001) was a standout basketball player at Purdue University in the NCAA and then with the Indianapolis Kautskys in the National Basketball League (NBL).

Kessler was from Anderson, Indiana and attended Anderson High School, where he graduated in 1932. He then enrolled at Purdue and played on the men's varsity basketball team for his final three years under future Hall of Fame coach Ward Lambert. Kessler was a two-time All-American (1935–36), and as a senior he became Purdue's first ever consensus All-American.

After college, Kessler played professionally for three seasons in the NBL for the Indianapolis Kautskys. He was named the league's Rookie of the Year in 1937–38, although Kessler's teams never once qualified for the postseason. In his later life, Kessler worked at General Motors and eventually became its Executive Vice President.
