= Minnesota Lake, Minnesota =

City in Minnesota, United States

Minnesota Lake
- City
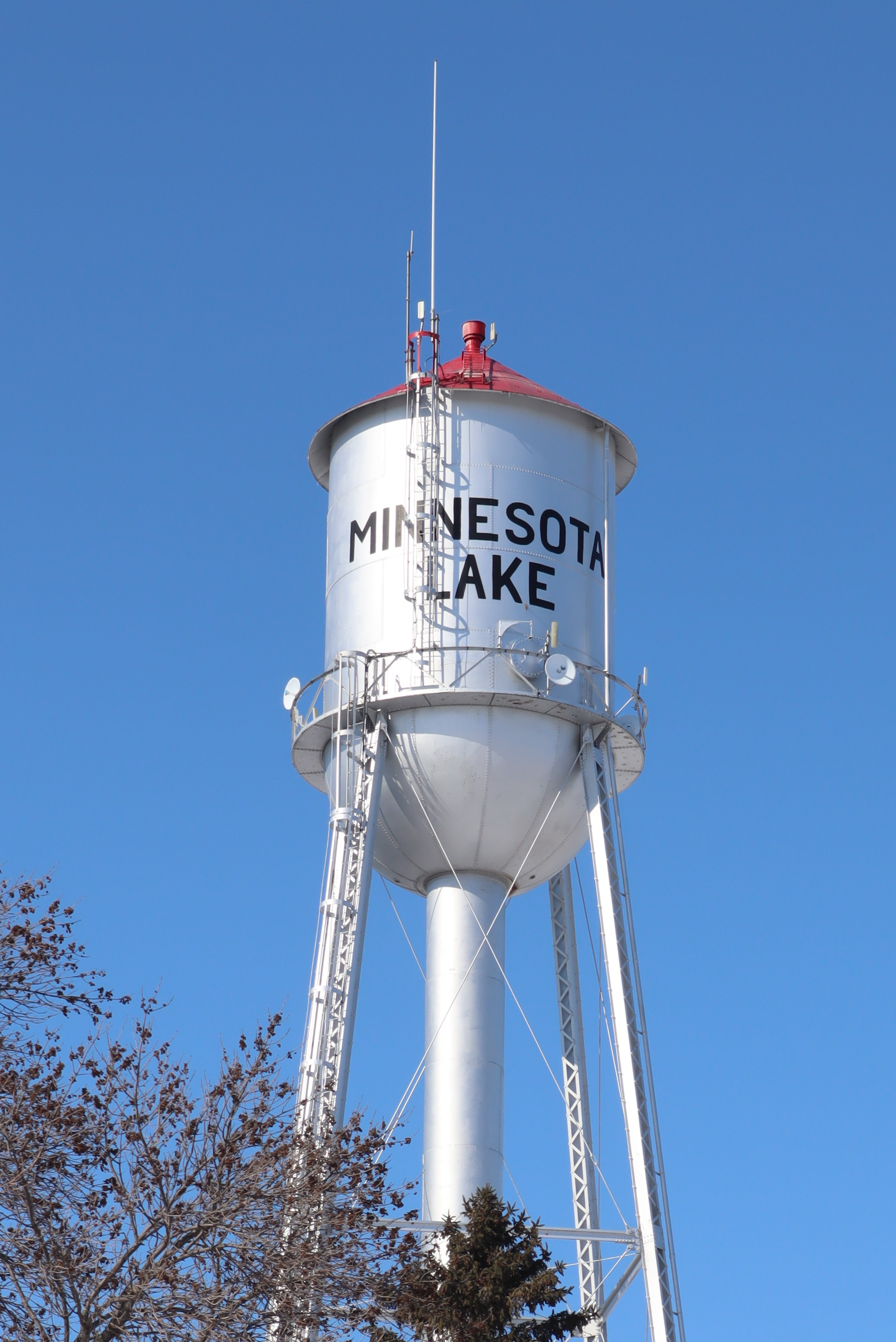
- Minnesota Lake water tower

- Location of Minnesota Lake, Minnesota
- Coordinates: 43°50′27″N 93°49′40″W
- Country: United States
- State: Minnesota
- Counties: Faribault, Blue Earth
- Founded: 1866

Government
  - Type: Mayor - Council
  - Mayor: Jeff Ramsley

Area
  - Total: 2.13 sq mi (5.52 km^{2})
  - Land: 1.62 sq mi (4.20 km^{2})
  - Water: 0.51 sq mi (1.32 km^{2})
- Elevation: 1,040 ft (320 m)

Population (2020)
  - Total: 661
  - Estimate (2021): 652
  - Density: 408/sq mi (157.5/km^{2})
- Time zone: UTC-6 (CST)
  - Summer (DST): UTC-5 (CDT)
- ZIP code: 56068
- Area code: 507
- FIPS code: 27-43198
- GNIS feature ID: 2395349
- Website: minnesotalake.com

Minnesota Lake is a city in Blue Earth and Faribault counties in the State of Minnesota. The population was 661 at the 2020 census. The bulk of the city is in Faribault County; a small part of the town extends into Blue Earth County.

== History ==
Minnesota Lake was platted in 1866, and named after the nearby Minnesota Lake. The historic home of Peter Kremer and Millie Zabel, early community leaders, operates as a library and museum.

== Geography ==
According to the United States Census Bureau, the city has a total area of 2.17 square miles (5.62 km^{2}), of which 1.66 square miles (4.30 km^{2}) is land and 0.51 square miles (1.32 km^{2}) is water.

Minnesota State Highway 22 serves as a main route in the community.

== Demographics ==
Historical population
Census	Pop.	Note	%±
1880	208		—
1890	340		63.5%
1900	518		52.4%
1910	445		−14.1%
1920	450		1.1%
1930	435		−3.3%
1940	526		20.9%
1950	609		15.8%
1960	697		14.4%
1970	711		2.0%
1980	744		4.6%
1990	681		−8.5%
2000	681		0.0%
2010	687		0.9%
2020	661		−3.8%
2021 (est.)	652		−1.4%
U.S. Decennial Census; 2020 Census

=== 2010 census ===
As of the census of 2010, there were 687 people, 295 households, and 192 families living in the city. The population density was 413.9 inhabitants per square mile (159.8/km^{2}). There were 331 housing units at an average density of 199.4 per square mile (77.0/km^{2}). The racial makeup of the city was 98.8% White, 0.4% African American, 0.6% from other races, and 0.1% from two or more races. Hispanic or Latino of any race were 2.9% of the population.

There were 295 households, of which 27.8% had children under the age of 18 living with them, 49.8% were married couples living together, 10.2% had a female householder with no husband present, 5.1% had a male householder with no wife present, and 34.9% were non-families. 28.8% of all households were made up of individuals, and 14.6% had someone living alone who was 65 years of age or older. The average household size was 2.33 and the average family size was 2.84.

The median age in the city was 41.1 years. 22.6% of residents were under the age of 18; 7.4% were between the ages of 18 and 24; 25.2% were from 25 to 44; 28.2% were from 45 to 64; and 16.6% were 65 years of age or older. The gender makeup of the city was 48.0% male and 52.0% female.

=== 2000 census ===
As of the census of 2000, there were 681 people, 297 households, and 196 families living in the city. The population density was 431.6 inhabitants per square mile (166.6/km^{2}). There were 316 housing units at an average density of 200.3 per square mile (77.3/km^{2}). The racial makeup of the city was 99.56% White, 0.15% Native American, and 0.29% from two or more races. Hispanic or Latino of any race were 0.59% of the population.

There were 297 households, out of which 29.3% had children under the age of 18 living with them, 58.6% were married couples living together, 3.7% had a female householder with no husband present, and 33.7% were non-families. 31.0% of all households were made up of individuals, and 20.2% had someone living alone who was 65 years of age or older. The average household size was 2.29 and the average family size was 2.86.

In the city, the population was spread out, with 24.2% under the age of 18, 7.6% from 18 to 24, 26.9% from 25 to 44, 21.6% from 45 to 64, and 19.7% who were 65 years of age or older. The median age was 40 years. For every 100 females, there were 105.1 males. For every 100 females age 18 and over, there were 100.8 males.

The median income for a household in the city was $34,896, and the median income for a family was $44,091. Males had a median income of $32,105 versus $19,844 for females. The per capita income for the city was $18,609. About 2.0% of families and 4.3% of the population were below the poverty line, including 3.3% of those under age 18 and 7.1% of those age 65 or over.
