= 1935–36 La Salle Explorers men's basketball team =

American college basketball season

1935–36 La Salle Explorers men's basketball
- Conference: Independent
- Record: 4–13
- Head coach: Leonard Tanseer (3rd season)
- Captain: Phil Kear
- Home arena: Wister Hall

The 1935–36 La Salle Explorers men's basketball team represented La Salle University during the 1935–36 NCAA men's basketball season. The head coach was Leonard Tanseer, coaching the explorers in his third season. The team finished with an overall record of 4–13.

== Schedule ==
Date time, TV	Opponent	Result	Record	Site city, state
Dec 11, 1935*	Pennsylvania	L 28–36	1–0	Wister Hall; Philadelphia, PA
Dec 14, 1936*	at Upsala	W 31–24	1–1	East Orange, NJ
Dec 18, 1935	Penn A.C.	L 23–40	1–2	Wister Hall; Philadelphia, PA
Dec. 30, 1935	St. Joseph's	L 19–23	1–3	Wister Hall; Philadelphia, PA
Jan. 11, 1936*	P.M.C.	W 36–30	2–3	Wister Hall; Philadelphia, PA
Jan. 14, 1936	at West Chester	L 20–39	2–4	West Chester, PA
Jan 17, 1936	at Long Island	L 9–49	2–5	Brooklyn, NY
Jan. 22, 1936	Catholic	W 35–33	3–5	Wister Hall; Philadelphia, PA
Jan. 29, 1936*	at St. John's	L 26–40	3–6	Old Madison Square Garden; Queens, NY
Feb. 1, 1936	Saint Joseph's	L 20–40	3–7	Wister Hall; Philadelphia, PA
Feb. 5, 1936	Rider	L 27–29	3–8	Wister Hall; Philadelphia, PA
Feb. 8, 1935	Scranton	L 19–36	3–9	Wister Hall; Philadelphia, PA
Feb. 12, 1936	at West Chester	L 30–36	3–10	West Chester, PA
Feb. 15, 1936	at P.M.C.	L 32–43	3–11	
Feb. 19, 1936*	Phila. Pharmacy	W 29–16	4–11	Wister Hall; Philadelphia, PA
Feb. 21, 1936*	Scranton	L 32–33	4–12	Wister Hall; Philadelphia, PA
Feb. 26, 1936*	Catholic	L 37–45	4–13	Wister Hall; Philadelphia, PA
*Non-conference game. (#) Tournament seedings in parentheses.
