= 1935–36 Wisconsin Badgers men's basketball team =

American college basketball season

1935–36 Wisconsin Badgers men's basketball
- Conference: Big Ten Conference
- Record: 11–9 (4–8 Big Ten)
- Head coach: Harold E. Foster
- Home arena: UW Fieldhouse

1935–36 Big Ten Conference men's basketball standings
	Conf.				Overall
Team	W		L	PCT	W		L	PCT
Indiana	11	–	1	.917	18	–	2	.900
Purdue	11	–	1	.917	16	–	4	.800
Michigan	7	–	5	.583	15	–	5	.750
Illinois	7	–	5	.583	13	–	6	.684
Northwestern	7	–	5	.583	13	–	6	.684
Ohio State	5	–	7	.417	12	–	8	.600
Iowa	5	–	7	.417	9	–	10	.474
Wisconsin	4	–	8	.333	11	–	9	.550
Minnesota	3	–	9	.250	7	–	17	.292
Chicago	0	–	12	.000	6	–	14	.300

The 1935–36 Wisconsin Badgers men's basketball team represented University of Wisconsin–Madison. The head coach was Harold E. Foster, coaching his second season with the Badgers. The team played their home games at the UW Fieldhouse in Madison, Wisconsin and was a member of the Big Ten Conference.

== Schedule ==
Date time, TV	Rank^{#}	Opponent^{#}	Result	Record	Site city, state
Regular Season
12/02/1935*		DePauw (IN)	W 18–16	1–0	UW Fieldhouse; Madison, Wisconsin
12/06/1935*		Michigan State	W 26–21	2–0	UW Fieldhouse; Madison, Wisconsin
12/09/1935*		Hamline (MN)	W 29–20	3–0	UW Fieldhouse; Madison, Wisconsin
12/14/1935*		Marquette	W 35–22	4–0	UW Fieldhouse; Madison, Wisconsin
12/21/1935*		at Marquette	W 46–21	5–0	Marquette Gymnasium; Milwaukee
12/23/1935*		at DePaul	L 22–27	5–1	University Auditorium; Chicago
1/01/1936*		Washburn (KS)	W 36–27	6–1	UW Fieldhouse; Madison, Wisconsin
1/04/1936		at Ohio State	L 23–44	6–2 (0–1)	Ohio Expo Center Coliseum; Columbus, Ohio
1/06/1936		at Chicago	W 38–36 ^{OT}	7–2 (1–1)	Henry Crown Field House; Chicago
1/11/1936		Illinois	L 27–29	7–3 (1–2)	UW Fieldhouse; Madison, Wisconsin
1/13/1936		Iowa	W 27–21	8–3 (2–2)	UW Fieldhouse; Madison, Wisconsin
1/20/1936		Indiana	L 24–26	8–4 (2–3)	UW Fieldhouse; Madison, Wisconsin
2/08/1936*		Butler	W 28–24	9–4	UW Fieldhouse; Madison, Wisconsin
2/10/1936		Ohio State	W 34–25	10–4 (3–3)	UW Fieldhouse; Madison, Wisconsin
2/15/1936		at Illinois	L 20–36	10–5 (3–4)	Huff Hall; Champaign, Illinois
2/17/1936		at Iowa	L 25–32	10–6 (3–5)	Iowa Field House; Iowa City, IA
2/22/1936		at Indiana	L 21–54	10–7 (3–6)	IU Fieldhouse; Bloomington, Indiana
2/24/1936		Northwestern	L 28–33	10–8 (3–7)	UW Fieldhouse; Madison, Wisconsin
2/29/1936		Chicago	W 40–32	11–8 (4–7)	UW Fieldhouse; Madison, Wisconsin
3/02/1936		at Northwestern	L 26–49	11–9 (4–8)	Patten Gymnasium; Evanston, Illinois
*Non-conference game. ^{#}Rankings from AP Poll. (#) Tournament seedings in parentheses.
