= 1935–36 Indiana Hoosiers men's basketball team =

American college basketball season

1935–36 Indiana Hoosiers men's basketball

Big Ten Champions
- Conference: Big Ten Conference
- Record: 18–2 (11–1 Big Ten)
- Head coach: Everett Dean (12th season)
- Captains: Wendel Walker; Lester Stout
- Home arena: The Fieldhouse

1935–36 Big Ten Conference men's basketball standings
	Conf.				Overall
Team	W		L	PCT	W		L	PCT
Indiana	11	–	1	.917	18	–	2	.900
Purdue	11	–	1	.917	16	–	4	.800
Michigan	7	–	5	.583	15	–	5	.750
Illinois	7	–	5	.583	13	–	6	.684
Northwestern	7	–	5	.583	13	–	6	.684
Ohio State	5	–	7	.417	12	–	8	.600
Iowa	5	–	7	.417	9	–	10	.474
Wisconsin	4	–	8	.333	11	–	9	.550
Minnesota	3	–	9	.250	7	–	17	.292
Chicago	0	–	12	.000	6	–	14	.300

The 1935–36 Indiana Hoosiers men's basketball team represented Indiana University. Their head coach was Everett Dean, who was in his 12th year. The team played its home games in The Fieldhouse in Bloomington, Indiana, and was a member of the Big Ten Conference.

The Hoosiers finished the regular season with an overall record of 18–2 and a conference record of 11–1, finishing 1st in the Big Ten Conference.

== Roster ==
No.	Name	Position	Ht.	Year	Hometown
3	Ken Gunning	F	5–11	Jr.	Shelbyville, Indiana
4	Wendel Walker	G	5–11	Sr.	Vincennes, Indiana
5	Vern Huffman	G	6–2	Jr.	New Castle, Indiana
7	Lester Stout	F	5–9	Sr.	Winamac, Indiana
8	Joseph Platt	G	5–11	So.	Young America, Indiana
9	Bob Etnire	G/F	5–11	Jr.	Logansport, Indiana
10	Willis Hosler	C	6–3	Jr.	Huntington, Indiana
11	Charles Scott	G	6–2	Sr.	Jeffersonville, Indiana
12	Phil Liehr	C	6–3	So.	Indianapolis
13	Willie Silberstein	F	5–8	So.	Brooklyn, New York
14	Fred Fechtman	C	6–8	Jr.	Indianapolis, Indiana
15	Charles Mendel	G	6–3	So.	Bourbon, Indiana
15	John Hobson	F	5–10	So.	Indianapolis
16	Carlos Brooks	G	6–1	So.	Mays, Indiana
17	Roger Ratliff	G	6–3	So.	Mooresville, Indiana
N/A	William Anderson	G	5–10	So.	Marion, Indiana
N/A	James Birr	C/G	6–3	So.	Indianapolis
N/A	Charles Campbell	G	5–3	So.	Shelbyville, Indiana
N/A	George Ditrich	C	6–2	So.	Bloomington, Indiana

== Schedule/results ==
Date time, TV	Rank^{#}	Opponent^{#}	Result	Record	Site city, state
Regular season
12/6/1935*		Ball State	W 44–28	1–0	The Fieldhouse; Bloomington, Indiana
12/14/1935*		at Loyola (Chicago)	W 32–25	2–0	Alumni Gym; Chicago
12/16/1935*		Miami (OH)	W 41–15	3–0	The Fieldhouse; Bloomington, Indiana
12/21/1935*		at Vanderbilt	W 56–18	4–0	Old Gym; Nashville, Tennessee
12/23/1935*		at Evansville	W 39–32	5–0	Evansville, Indiana
1/3/1936*		at DePaul	L 31–35	5–1	University Auditorium; Chicago
1/6/1936		at Michigan	W 33–27	6–1 (1–0)	Yost Field House; Ann Arbor, Michigan
1/11/1936		Northwestern	W 27–24	7–1 (2–0)	The Fieldhouse; Bloomington, Indiana
1/13/1936		Chicago	W 33–30	8–1 (3–0)	The Fieldhouse; Bloomington, Indiana
1/18/1936		at Minnesota	W 33–31	9–1 (4–0)	Minnesota Field House; Minneapolis
1/20/1936		at Wisconsin	W 26–24	10–1 (5–0)	Wisconsin Field House; Madison, Wisconsin
1/30/1936*		at Louisville	W 48–26	11–1 (5–0)	Belknap Gymnasium; Louisville, Kentucky
2/1/1936		Minnesota	W 26–23	12–1 (6–0)	The Fieldhouse; Bloomington, Indiana
2/8/1936		at Chicago	W 42–24	13–1 (7–0)	Henry Crown Field House; Chicago
2/10/1936*		Franklin College	W 39–29	14–1 (7–0)	The Fieldhouse; Bloomington, Indiana
2/15/1936		at Ohio State	L 34–43	14–2 (7–1)	Ohio Expo Center Coliseum; Columbus, Ohio
2/17/1936		Michigan	W 37–23	15–2 (8–1)	The Fieldhouse; Bloomington, Indiana
2/22/1936		Wisconsin	W 54–21	16–2 (9–1)	The Fieldhouse; Bloomington, Indiana
2/29/1936		at Northwestern	W 41–34	17–2 (10–1)	Old Patten Gymnasium; Evanston, Illinois
3/2/1936		Ohio State	W 40–34	18–2 (11–1)	The Fieldhouse; Bloomington, Indiana
*Non-conference game. ^{#}Rankings from AP Poll. (#) Tournament seedings in parentheses.
