= 1936 Southern Conference men's basketball tournament =

- Classification: Division I
- Teams: 8
- Site: Thompson Gym; Raleigh, NC
- Champions: North Carolina (6th title)
- Winning coach: Walter Skidmore (1st title)

1935–36 Southern Conference men's basketball standings
| | Conf. | | | | Overall |
| Team | W | | L | PCT | W | | L | PCT |
|---|---|---|---|---|---|---|---|---|
| Washington and Lee | 10 | – | 1 | .909 | 19 | – | 2 | .905 |
| North Carolina † | 13 | – | 3 | .813 | 21 | – | 4 | .840 |
| North Carolina State | 10 | – | 3 | .769 | 15 | – | 4 | .789 |
| Maryland | 4 | – | 3 | .571 | 14 | – | 6 | .700 |
| Clemson | 5 | – | 5 | .500 | 15 | – | 7 | .682 |
| Duke | 4 | – | 5 | .444 | 20 | – | 6 | .769 |
| Virginia | 4 | – | 8 | .333 | 11 | – | 13 | .458 |
| South Carolina | 1 | – | 6 | .143 | 11 | – | 8 | .579 |
| Virginia Tech | 1 | – | 9 | .100 | 5 | – | 16 | .238 |
| VMI | 0 | – | 10 | .000 | 3 | – | 14 | .176 |
† Southern Conference Tournament winner

The 1936 Southern Conference men's basketball tournament took place from March 5–7, 1936 at Thompson Gym in Raleigh, North Carolina. The North Carolina Tar Heels won their sixth Southern Conference title, led by head coach Walter Skidmore.

== Format ==
The top eight finishers of the conference's ten members were eligible for the tournament. Teams were seeded based on conference winning percentage. The tournament used a preset bracket consisting of three rounds.

== Bracket ==
Quarterfinals; March 5
North Carolina | 39
Virginia | 21
NC State | 32
Clemson | 31
Washington and Lee | 36
Virginia Tech | 20
Maryland | 47
Duke | 35

Semifinals; March 6
North Carolina | 31
NC State | 28
Washington and Lee | 32
Maryland | 28

Finals; March 7
North Carolina | 50
Washington and Lee | 45

* Overtime game

== See also ==
- List of Southern Conference men's basketball champions
