= 1935–36 Cincinnati Bearcats men's basketball team =

American college basketball season

1935–36 Cincinnati Bearcats men's basketball
- Conference: Buckeye Athletic Association
- Record: 10–7 (8–2 BAA)
- Head coach: Tay Brown (3rd season)
- Home arena: Schmidlapp Gymnasium

The 1935–36 Cincinnati Bearcats men's basketball team represented the University of Cincinnati during the 1935–36 NCAA men's basketball season. The head coach was Tay Brown, coaching his third season with the Bearcats. The team finished with an overall record of 10–7.

== Schedule ==
Date time, TV	Opponent	Result	Record	Site city, state
December 13	Wilmington	W 46–30	1–0	Schmidlapp Gymnasium; Cincinnati, OH
December 19	Akron Goodyear	L 14–43	1–1	Schmidlapp Gymnasium; Cincinnati, OH
December 28	at Butler	L 26–39	1–2	Butler Fieldhouse; Indianapolis, IN
January 3	Alumni	W 42–25	2–2	Schmidlapp Gymnasium; Cincinnati, OH
January 11	Ohio Wesleyan	W 26–24	3–2	Schmidlapp Gymnasium; Cincinnati, OH
January 16	Dayton	W 39–27	4–2	Schmidlapp Gymnasium; Cincinnati, OH
January 18	at Marshall	W 41–34	5–2	Huntington, WV
January 22	at Ohio	W 34–29	6–2	Men's Gymnasium; Athens, OH
January 30	at Akron Goodyear	L 32–41	6–3	
February 5	Miami (OH)	W 36–34	7–3	Schmidlapp Gymnasium; Cincinnati, OH
February 8	Ohio	W 35–34	8–3	Schmidlapp Gymnasium; Cincinnati, OH
February 11	at Dayton	W 32–23	9–3	Montgomery County Fair Grounds Coliseum; Dayton, OH
February 14	Marshall	W 51–33	10–3	Schmidlapp Gymnasium; Cincinnati, OH
February 15	at Toledo	L 33–36	10–4	The Field House; Toledo, OH
February 22	at Ohio Wesleyan	L 30–44	10–5	Delaware, OH
February 29	at Miami (OH)	L 23–28	10–6	Withrow Court; Oxford, OH
March 12	at Indianapolis	L 36–46	10–7	Indianapolis, IN
*Non-conference game. (#) Tournament seedings in parentheses.
