= 1935–36 William & Mary Indians men's basketball team =

American college basketball season

1935–36 William & Mary Indians men's basketball
- Conference: Independent
- Record: 11–6
- Head coach: Tom Dowler (2nd season)
- Home arena: Blow Gymnasium

The 1935–36 William & Mary Indians men's basketball team represented the College of William & Mary in intercollegiate basketball during the 1935–36 season. Under the second year of head coach Tom Dowler, the team finished the season with an 11–6 record. This was the 31st season of the collegiate basketball program at William & Mary, whose nickname is now the Tribe.

This was William & Mary's final season as an independent as they would become members of the Southern Conference the following season.

== Schedule ==
Date time, TV	Rank^{#}	Opponent^{#}	Result	Record	Site city, state
Regular season
*		Roanoke	W 44–27	1–0	Blow Gymnasium; Williamsburg, VA
*		Medical College of Virginia	W 58–25	2–0	Blow Gymnasium; Williamsburg, VA
*		at Virginia	W 32–24	3–0	Memorial Gymnasium; Charlottesville, VA
*		Hampden–Sydney	W 43–35	4–0	Blow Gymnasium; Williamsburg, VA
*		at VPI	W 36–28	5–0	War Memorial Gymnasium; Blacksburg, VA
*		at Roanoke	W 41–25	6–0	Roanoke, VA
*		at VMI	L 37–41	6–1	Lexington, VA
*		at Washington and Lee	L 20–57	6–2	Lexington, VA
1/29/1936*		at Navy	L 24–38	6–3	Annapolis, MD
1/30/1936*		at Maryland	L 39–41	6–4	Ritchie Coliseum; College Park, MD
*		Wake Forest	W 41–30	7–4	Blow Gymnasium; Williamsburg, VA
*		VPI	W 42–36	8–4	Blow Gymnasium; Williamsburg, VA
*		VMI	W 50–48	9–4	Blow Gymnasium; Williamsburg, VA
*		Washington and Lee	W 58–56	10–4	Blow Gymnasium; Williamsburg, VA
2/25/1936*		Richmond	L 39–59	10–5	Blow Gymnasium; Williamsburg, VA
*		Virginia	W 47–35	11–5	Blow Gymnasium; Williamsburg, VA
3/2/1936*		at Richmond	L 39–58	11–5	Millhiser Gymnasium; Richmond, VA
*Non-conference game. ^{#}Rankings from AP Poll. (#) Tournament seedings in parentheses.
