= 1935–36 Michigan Wolverines men's basketball team =

American college basketball season

1935–36 Michigan Wolverines men's basketball
- Conference: Big Ten Conference
- Record: 15–5 (7–5 Big Ten)
- Head coach: Franklin Cappon
- Captain: Chelso Tamango
- Home arena: Yost Field House

1935–36 Big Ten Conference men's basketball standings
	Conf.				Overall
Team	W		L	PCT	W		L	PCT
Indiana	11	–	1	.917	18	–	2	.900
Purdue	11	–	1	.917	16	–	4	.800
Michigan	7	–	5	.583	15	–	5	.750
Illinois	7	–	5	.583	13	–	6	.684
Northwestern	7	–	5	.583	13	–	6	.684
Ohio State	5	–	7	.417	12	–	8	.600
Iowa	5	–	7	.417	9	–	10	.474
Wisconsin	4	–	8	.333	11	–	9	.550
Minnesota	3	–	9	.250	7	–	17	.292
Chicago	0	–	12	.000	6	–	14	.300

The 1935–36 Michigan Wolverines men's basketball team represented the University of Michigan in intercollegiate basketball during the 1935–36 season. The team compiled a 15–5 record, and 7–5 against Big Ten Conference opponents. The team scored 700 points in 20 games for an average of 35.0 points per game – the highest point total and scoring per game in school history up to that time. Michigan finished tied for third place in the Big Ten.

== Scoring statistics ==
Player	Games	Field goals	Free throws	Points	Points per game
John "Jake" Townsend	20	59	36	154	7.7
George Rudness	20	46	39	131	6.6
Earl Townsend	20	48	19	115	5.8
Chelso Tamagno	18	39	9	87	4.8
John Gee	17	25	24	74	4.4
John Jablonski	19	14	16	44	2.3
Earl Meyers	14	14	7	35	2.5
Herman Fishman	15	11	4	26	1.7
Matt Patanelli	15	3	4	10	0.7
Manuel Slavin	6	3	3	9	1.5
Bill Barclay	5	2	3	7	1.4
Arthur Evans	11	2	0	4	0.4
William Lane	4	1	0	2	0.5
Donald Brewer	4	1	0	2	0.5
Totals	20	268	164	700	35.0

== Coaching staff ==
- Franklin Cappon - coach
- Fielding H. Yost - athletic director
