= Ike Poole =

American basketball player (1915–2002)

Personal information
- Born: October 10, 1915 McGehee, Arkansas
- Died: June 24, 2002 (aged 86)
- Listed height: 6 ft 3 in (1.91 m)

Career information
- College: Arkansas (1933–1936)
- Position: Forward

Career highlights
- Consensus All-American (1936); 2× All-SWC (1935, 1936)

H. L. "Ike" Poole (October 10, 1915 – June 24, 2002) was an All-American basketball player at the University of Arkansas. Hailing from McGehee, Arkansas, Poole lettered three years in football, track and basketball at Arkansas. During his time in Fayetteville, Poole led the Razorbacks to two Southwest Conference titles and was twice named first team All-Conference. As a senior in 1936, Poole was named a consensus All-American and was an alternate on the 1936 Olympic basketball team.

Poole was inducted into the Arkansas Razorbacks Hall of Honor in 1998. In 1994, he was inducted into the Arkansas Sports Hall of Fame.
