= Minnesota Lake (Faribault County, Minnesota) =

Lake in the state of Minnesota, United States

- Location within Minnesota
- Location: Faribault and Blue Earth counties, Minnesota
- Coordinates: 43°50′15″N 93°51′39″W
- Type: lake

Minnesota Lake is a lake in the U.S. state of Minnesota.

Minnesota Lake was named before the state of Minnesota itself; the name is derived from the Dakota language meaning "slightly whitish water".

== See also ==
- List of lakes in Minnesota
