= 1926–27 NCAA men's basketball season =

Men's collegiate basketball season

- Helms National Champions: Notre Dame (retroactive selection in 1943)
- Player of the Year (Helms): Vic Hanson, Syracuse (retroactive selection in 1944)

The 1926–27 NCAA men's basketball season began in December 1926, progressed through the regular season and conference tournaments, and concluded in March 1927.

== Season headlines ==
- In February 1943, the Helms Athletic Foundation retroactively selected Notre Dame as its national champion for the 1926–27 season.
- In 2009, the Premo-Porretta Power Poll retroactively selected California as its top-ranked team for the 1926–27 season.

== Regular season ==
=== Conferences ===
==== Conference winners and tournaments ====
Conference	Regular season winner	Conference player of the year	Conference tournament	Tournament venue (City)	Tournament winner
Big Ten Conference	Michigan	None selected	No Tournament		
Eastern Intercollegiate Basketball League	Dartmouth	None selected	No Tournament		
Missouri Valley Intercollegiate Athletic Association	Kansas	None selected	No Tournament		
Pacific Coast Conference	Oregon (North); California (South)		No Tournament; California defeated Oregon in best-of-three conference championship playoff series		
Rocky Mountain Athletic Conference	Colorado College (Eastern); Montana State (Western)		No Tournament		
Southern Conference	South Carolina	None selected	1927 Southern Conference men's basketball tournament	Municipal Auditorium (Atlanta, Georgia)	Vanderbilt
Southwest Conference	Arkansas	None selected	No Tournament		

==== Conference standings ====
1926–27 Big Ten Conference men's basketball standings
	Conf.				Overall
Team	W		L	PCT	W		L	PCT
Michigan	10	–	2	.833	14	–	3	.824
Indiana	9	–	3	.750	13	–	4	.765
Purdue	9	–	3	.750	12	–	5	.706
Illinois	7	–	5	.583	10	–	7	.588
Wisconsin	7	–	5	.583	10	–	7	.588
Iowa	7	–	5	.583	9	–	8	.529
Ohio State	6	–	6	.500	11	–	6	.647
Chicago	3	–	9	.250	6	–	11	.353
Minnesota	1	–	11	.083	3	–	13	.188
Northwestern	1	–	11	.083	3	–	14	.176

1926–27 Eastern Intercollegiate Basketball League standings
	Conf.				Overall
Team	W		L	PCT	W		L	PCT
Dartmouth†	7	–	3	.700	17	–	6	.739
Princeton	7	–	3	.700	11	–	11	.500
Penn	5	–	5	.500	16	–	10	.615
Columbia	5	–	5	.500	8	–	9	.471
Cornell	4	–	6	.400	5	–	13	.278
Yale	2	–	8	.200	11	–	12	.478
† Conference championship winner

1926–27 Missouri Valley Intercollegiate Athletic Association men's basketball standings
	Conf.				Overall
Team	W		L	PCT	W		L	PCT
Kansas	10	–	2	.833	15	–	2	.882
Oklahoma	8	–	4	.667	12	–	5	.706
Missouri	6	–	4	.600	9	–	8	.529
Nebraska	7	–	5	.583	12	–	6	.667
Kansas State	6	–	6	.500	10	–	8	.556
Oklahoma A&M	6	–	6	.500	8	–	9	.471
Drake	6	–	6	.500	8	–	10	.444
Iowa State	7	–	8	.467	9	–	9	.500
Washington University	2	–	8	.200	5	–	10	.333
Grinnell	2	–	10	.167	2	–	15	.118

1926–27 Pacific Coast Conference men's basketball standings
	Conf.				Overall
Team	W		L	PCT	W		L	PCT
North
Oregon	8	–	2	.800	24	–	4	.857
Washington	7	–	3	.700	15	–	4	.789
Idaho	7	–	3	.700	24	–	7	.774
Oregon Agricultural	4	–	6	.400	14	–	11	.560
Washington State	3	–	7	.300	11	–	10	.524
Montana	1	–	9	.100	5	–	11	.313
South
California †	5	–	0	1.000	13	–	0	1.000
Stanford	3	–	2	.600	9	–	9	.500
USC	0	–	6	.000	10	–	8	.556
† Conference playoff series winner

1926–27 Rocky Mountain Conference standings
	Conf.				Overall
Team	W		L	PCT	W		L	PCT
Eastern
Colorado College	12	–	2	.857	12	–	4	.750
Northern Colorado	10	–	4	.714	10	–	4	.714
Wyoming	8	–	4	.667	9	–	5	.643
Colorado	7	–	5	.583	7	–	5	.583
Denver	5	–	7	.417	5	–	7	.417
Colorado Agricultural	4	–	8	.333	4	–	8	.333
Colorado Mines	2	–	10	.167	3	–	10	.231
Western State	0	–	7	.000	5	–	7	.417
Western
Montana State	10	–	2	.833	30	–	7	.811
Utah Agricultural	9	–	3	.750	11	–	3	.786
Utah	4	–	8	.333	5	–	10	.333
BYU	1	–	11	.083	5	–	14	.263

1926–27 Southern Conference men's basketball standings
	Conf.				Overall
Team	W		L	PCT	W		L	PCT
South Carolina	9	–	1	.900	14	–	4	.778
Vanderbilt†	7	–	1	.875	20	–	4	.833
Georgia Tech	8	–	2	.800	17	–	10	.630
Auburn	12	–	4	.750	13	–	6	.684
Washington and Lee	6	–	2	.750	10	–	6	.625
Mississippi	10	–	4	.714	13	–	5	.722
NC State	5	–	2	.714	12	–	5	.706
North Carolina	7	–	3	.700	17	–	7	.708
Maryland	6	–	4	.600	10	–	10	.500
Mississippi A&M	7	–	5	.583	17	–	7	.708
Tennessee	5	–	4	.556	7	–	12	.368
Alabama	4	–	5	.444	5	–	8	.385
Virginia	5	–	7	.417	9	–	10	.474
Tulane	7	–	10	.412	7	–	10	.412
LSU	3	–	5	.375	7	–	9	.438
Georgia	3	–	6	.333	14	–	8	.636
Virginia Tech	2	–	6	.250	6	–	8	.429
Kentucky	1	–	6	.143	3	–	13	.188
Clemson	1	–	7	.125	2	–	13	.133
Florida	1	–	8	.111	6	–	20	.231
VMI	0	–	7	.000	4	–	11	.267
Sewanee	0	–	10	.000	3	–	11	.214
† Southern Conference Tournament winner

1926–27 Southwest Conference men's basketball standings
	Conf.				Overall
Team	W		L	PCT	W		L	PCT
Arkansas	8	–	2	.800	14	–	2	.875
SMU	7	–	4	.636	12	–	5	.706
Texas	7	–	4	.636	13	–	9	.591
TCU	6	–	4	.600	9	–	8	.529
Texas A&M	4	–	6	.400	10	–	7	.588
Baylor	0	–	3	.000	8	–	4	.667
Rice	0	–	9	.000	0	–	9	.000

=== Independents ===
A total of 93 college teams played as major independents. Notre Dame (19–1) had the highest winning percentage (.950) and West Texas State (23–3) finished with the most wins.

1926–27 NCAA men's basketball independents standings
	Conf.				Overall
Team	W		L	PCT	W		L	PCT
Notre Dame		–		–	19	–	1	.950
New Hampshire		–		–	14	–	1	.933
Springfield (Mass.)		–		–	13	–	1	.929
Fordham		–		–	20	–	2	.909
Northern Illinois State		–		–	20	–	2	.909
Muskingum		–		–	19	–	2	.905
Wichita Municipal		–		–	19	–	2	.905
The Citadel		–		–	17	–	2	.895
Pittsburg State		–		–	16	–	2	.889
Western State Normal		–		–	16	–	2	.889
West Texas State		–		–	23	–	3	.885
Navy		–		–	15	–	2	.882
Wake Forest		–		–	22	–	3	.880
Colgate		–		–	17	–	3	.850
Northern Arizona State		–		–	17	–	3	.850
Denison		–		–	16	–	3	.842
Rhode Island State		–		–	13	–	3	.813
Butler		–		–	17	–	4	.810
Duquesne		–		–	16	–	4	.800
Evansville		–		–	16	–	4	.800
Furman		–		–	16	–	4	.800
Syracuse		–		–	15	–	4	.789
Army		–		–	11	–	3	.786
Xavier		–		–	11	–	3	.786
Bucknell		–		–	14	–	4	.778
Penn State		–		–	14	–	4	.778
Richmond		–		–	14	–	4	.778
Rutgers		–		–	10	–	3	.769
Seton Hall		–		–	10	–	3	.769
Arizona		–		–	13	–	4	.765
Loyola (Ill.)		–		–	13	–	4	.765
New Mexico		–		–	13	–	4	.765
CCNY		–		–	9	–	3	.750
UCLA		–		–	12	–	4	.750
Creighton		–		–	14	–	5	.737
Temple		–		–	14	–	5	.737
Buffalo		–		–	11	–	4	.733
Cincinnati		–		–	13	–	5	.722
St. Bonaventure		–		–	13	–	5	.722
Carleton		–		–	12	–	5	.706
Westminster (Pa.)		–		–	12	–	5	.706
Harvard		–		–	10	–	5	.667
Mount Union		–		–	12	–	6	.667
Canisius		–		–	9	–	5	.643
Bowling Green State		–		–	12	–	7	.632
Western Kentucky State		–		–	12	–	7	.632
Villanova		–		–	11	–	7	.611
Lehigh		–		–	9	–	6	.600
Miami (Ohio)		–		–	9	–	6	.600
St. John's (N.Y.)		–		–	15	–	10	.600
Washburn		–		–	12	–	8	.600
Pittsburgh		–		–	10	–	7	.588
Louisville		–		–	7	–	5	.583
Connecticut		–		–	9	–	7	.563
Muhlenberg		–		–	9	–	7	.563
Saint Mary's (Calif.)		–		–	9	–	7	.563
Wooster		–		–	9	–	7	.563
Davidson		–		–	10	–	8	.556
Georgetown		–		–	5	–	4	.556
West Virginia		–		–	10	–	8	.556
Holy Cross		–		–	7	–	6	.538
Loyola (Md.)		–		–	7	–	6	.538
Santa Clara		–		–	7	–	6	.538
George Washington		–		–	8	–	7	.533
Niagara		–		–	8	–	7	.533
St. Ignatius		–		–	8	–	7	.533
Manhattan		–		–	9	–	8	.529
Dayton		–		–	10	–	9	.526
DePaul		–		–	7	–	7	.500
DePauw		–		–	8	–	8	.500
Valparaiso		–		–	10	–	10	.500
Detroit		–		–	8	–	9	.471
Bradley		–		–	7	–	8	.467
William & Mary		–		–	7	–	8	.467
Boston University		–		–	6	–	7	.462
Texas Tech		–		–	8	–	10	.444
Marshall		–		–	7	–	9	.438
Brown		–		–	6	–	9	.400
Toledo		–		–	6	–	9	.400
Michigan State		–		–	7	–	11	.389
Ohio		–		–	8	–	13	.381
New York University		–		–	4	–	7	.364
St. Joseph's		–		–	6	–	11	.353
Tempe State		–		–	4	–	8	.333
Marquette		–		–	5	–	10	.333
Tulsa		–		–	3	–	6	.333
New Mexico A&M		–		–	6	–	13	.316
Kent State Normal		–		–	5	–	11	.313
Duke		–		–	4	–	10	.286
Indiana State		–		–	3	–	13	.188
Lafayette		–		–	3	–	14	.176
Saint Francis (N.Y.)		–		–	2	–	12	.143
Saint Louis		–		–	0	–	14	.000

== Awards ==
=== Helms College Basketball All-Americans ===
The practice of selecting a Consensus All-American Team did not begin until the 1928–29 season. The Helms Athletic Foundation later retroactively selected a list of All-Americans for the 1926–27 season.

Player	Team
Syd Corenman	Creighton
George Dixon	California
Vic Hanson	Syracuse
John Lorch	Columbia
Ross McBurney	Wichita
John Nyikos	Notre Dame
Bennie Oosterbaan	Michigan
Gerald Spohn	Washburn
Cat Thompson	Montana State
Harry Wilson	Army

=== Major player of the year awards ===
- Helms Player of the Year: Vic Hanson, Syracuse (retroactive selection in 1944)

== Coaching changes ==
A number of teams changed coaches during the season and after it ended.

Team	Former Coach	Interim Coach	New Coach	Reason
Clemson	Tink Gillam		Josh Cody	
Colorado Agricultural	Rudy Lavik		Joe Ryan	Left to coach at Northern Arizona.
Connecticut	Sumner Dole		Louis Alexander	
Furman	Billy Laval		Rock Norman	
George Washington	James Lemon		Harry W. Crum	
Georgetown	John O'Reilly		Elmer Ripley	O'Reilly retired after the end of the season.
Idaho	Dave MacMillan		Richard Fox	MacMillan left to coach at Minnesota
Illinois State	Don Karnes		Joe Cogdal	
Indiana State	David Glascock		Wally Marks	
Kentucky	Basil Hayden		John Mauer	
Marshall	Bill Strickling		Johnny Stuart	
Minnesota	Harold Taylor		Dave MacMillan	
Mississippi A&M	Bernie Bierman		Ray G. Dauber	
New Mexico A&M	Arthur Burkholder		Ted Coffman	
Niagara	Pete Dwyer		William McCarthy	
Northern Arizona State	Emzy Harvey Lynch		Rudy Lavik	
Northwestern	Maury Kent		Dutch Lonborg	
Rice	Franklyn Ashcraft		Russell Daughtery	
Saint Louis	Squint Hunter		Harry Reget	
South Carolina	Branch Bocock		A. Burnet Stoney	
St. Bonaventure	Jack Flavin		Frederick V. Ostergren	
St. John's	John Crenny		Buck Freeman	
Texas	E. J. Stewart		Mysterious Walker	
Aggies	Dana X. Bible		Charles Bassett	
Texas Tech	Grady Higginbotham		Victor Payne	
USC	Les Turner		Leo Calland	
Utah	Ike Armstrong		Vadal Peterson	
Valparaiso	Conrad Moll		Earl Scott	
Vanderbilt	Josh Cody		Johnny Floyd	Cody left to coach at Clemson.
Virginia Tech	Henry Redd		Bud Moore	
