= 1926–27 Georgia Bulldogs basketball team =

American college basketball team season

1926–27 Georgia Bulldogs basketball
- Conference: Southern Conference
- Record: 14–8 (3–6 SoCon)
- Head coach: Herman Stegeman (8th season)
- Captain: Walter Forbes
- Home arena: Woodruff Hall

1926–27 Southern Conference men's basketball standings
	Conf.				Overall
Team	W		L	PCT	W		L	PCT
South Carolina	9	–	1	.900	14	–	4	.778
Vanderbilt†	7	–	1	.875	20	–	4	.833
Georgia Tech	8	–	2	.800	17	–	10	.630
Auburn	12	–	4	.750	13	–	6	.684
Washington and Lee	6	–	2	.750	10	–	6	.625
Mississippi	10	–	4	.714	13	–	5	.722
NC State	5	–	2	.714	12	–	5	.706
North Carolina	7	–	3	.700	17	–	7	.708
Maryland	6	–	4	.600	10	–	10	.500
Mississippi A&M	7	–	5	.583	17	–	7	.708
Tennessee	5	–	4	.556	7	–	12	.368
Alabama	4	–	5	.444	5	–	8	.385
Virginia	5	–	7	.417	9	–	10	.474
Tulane	7	–	10	.412	7	–	10	.412
LSU	3	–	5	.375	7	–	9	.438
Georgia	3	–	6	.333	14	–	8	.636
Virginia Tech	2	–	6	.250	6	–	8	.429
Kentucky	1	–	6	.143	3	–	13	.188
Clemson	1	–	7	.125	2	–	13	.133
Florida	1	–	8	.111	6	–	20	.231
VMI	0	–	7	.000	4	–	11	.267
Sewanee	0	–	10	.000	3	–	11	.214
† Southern Conference Tournament winner

The 1926–27 Georgia Bulldogs basketball team represented the University of Georgia as a member of the Southern Conference (SoCon) during the 1926–27 NCAA men's basketball season. Led by eighth-year head coach Herman Stegeman, the Bulldogs compiled an overall record of 14–8 with a mark of 3–6 in conference play, placing 16th in the SoCon. The team captain was Walter Forbes.

== Roster ==
1926–27 Georgia Bulldogs men's basketball team
Players
Coaches

Pos.	#	Name	Height	Weight	Year	Previous school	Hometown
		George Florence	—	—
		George Keen	—	—
		Roy Drew	—	—
		Walter Forbes	—	—
		Hoyt Turner	—	—

Head coach

Herman Stegeman

Assistant coach(es)

Legend

- (C) Team captain
- (S) Suspended
- (I) Ineligible
- (W) Walk-on
- Injured
- Current redshirt

== Schedule ==
Date time, TV	Opponent	Result	Record	Site city, state
12/11/1926	Southern Bell	W 52-21	1–0	
12/18/1926	at Ft. McPherson	W 80-15	2–0	
12/23/1926	Atlanta YMCA	W 44-34	3–0	
1/5/1927	Furman	W 39-20	4–0	
1/8/1927	Florida	L 32-33	4–1	
1/12/1927	Tennessee	W 29-28	5–1	
1/13/1927	Wofford	W 65-22	6–1	
1/15/1927	Ga. Tech	L 35-36	6–2	
1/19/1927	at North Carolina	L 27-33	6–3	
1/21/1927	at Virginia	W 29-20	7–3	
1/22/1927	at Maryland	L 33-34	7–4	
1/29/1927	at Ga. Tech	L 27-33	7–5	
2/5/1927	at Mercer	W 37-26	8–5	
2/9/1927	A.A.C.	W 30-28	9–5	
2/12/1927	at A.A.C.	L 25-37	9–6	
2/14/1927	Clemson	W 34-23	10–6	
2/17/1927	Presbyterian	W 51-23	11–6	
2/19/1927	Ga. Tech	L 25-36	11–7	
2/25/1927	V.M.I.	W 36-14	12–7	
2/26/1927	Maryland	W 27-22	13–7	
2/27/1927	North Carolina	W 23-20	14–7	
2/28/1927	Vanderbilt	L 44-46	14–8	
*Non-conference game. (#) Tournament seedings in parentheses.
