= 1927 NCAA Men's Basketball All-Americans =

- Awarded for: 1926–27 NCAA men's basketball season

The 1927 College Basketball All-American team, as chosen retroactively by the Helms Athletic Foundation. The player highlighted in gold was chosen as the Helms Foundation Player of the Year retroactively in 1944.

Player	Team
Syd Corenman	Creighton
George Dixon	California
Vic Hanson	Syracuse
John Lorch	Columbia
Ross McBurney	Wichita
John Nyikos	Notre Dame
Bennie Oosterbaan	Michigan
Gerald Spohn	Washburn
Cat Thompson	Montana State
Harry Wilson	Army

== See also ==
- 1926–27 NCAA men's basketball season
