= 1926–27 Michigan Wolverines men's basketball team =

American college basketball season

1926–27 Michigan Wolverines men's basketball
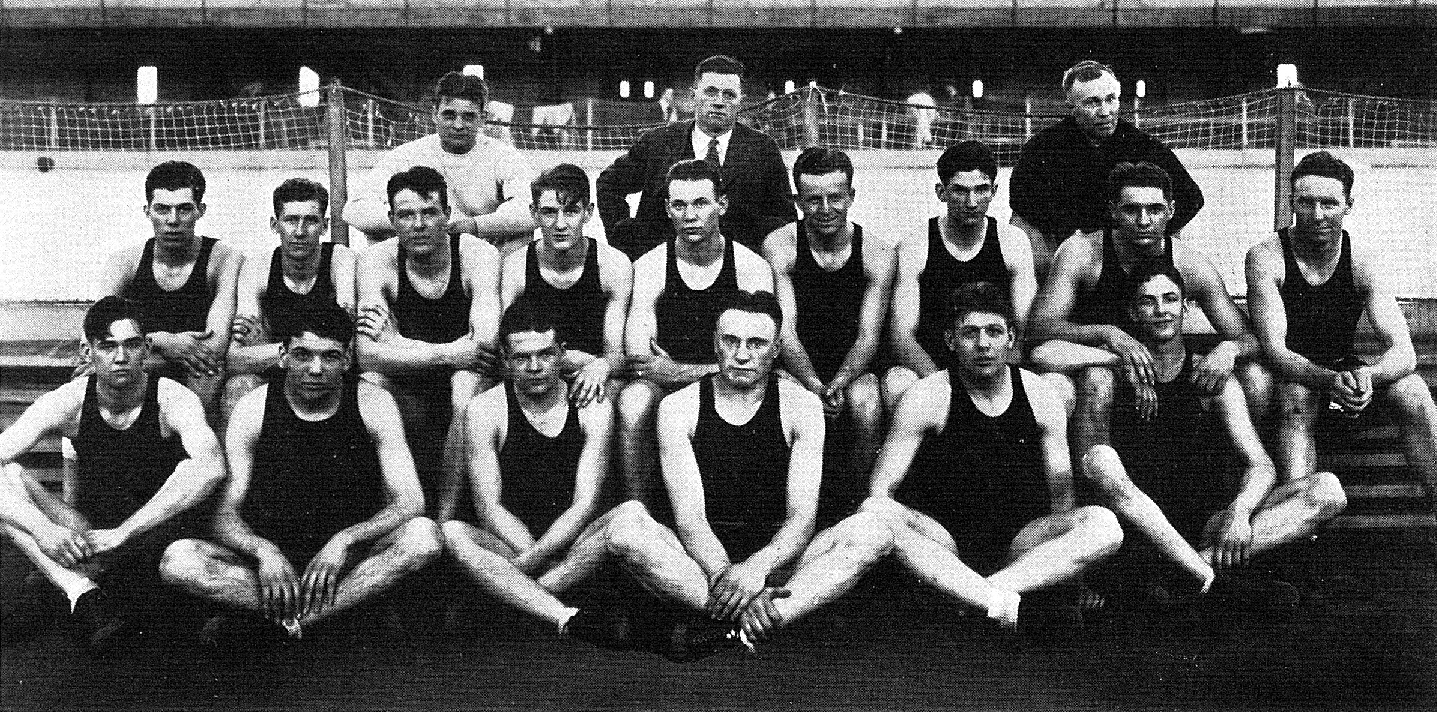

Big Ten regular season champions
- Conference: Big Ten Conference
- Record: 14–3 (10–2 Big Nine)
- Head coach: E. J. Mather
- Assistant coaches: Franklin Cappon; Harry Kipke; George F. Veenker
- Captain: Ed Chambers
- Home arena: Yost Field House

1926–27 Big Ten Conference men's basketball standings
	Conf.				Overall
Team	W		L	PCT	W		L	PCT
Michigan	10	–	2	.833	14	–	3	.824
Indiana	9	–	3	.750	13	–	4	.765
Purdue	9	–	3	.750	12	–	5	.706
Illinois	7	–	5	.583	10	–	7	.588
Wisconsin	7	–	5	.583	10	–	7	.588
Iowa	7	–	5	.583	9	–	8	.529
Ohio State	6	–	6	.500	11	–	6	.647
Chicago	3	–	9	.250	6	–	11	.353
Minnesota	1	–	11	.083	3	–	13	.188
Northwestern	1	–	11	.083	3	–	14	.176

The 1926–27 Michigan Wolverines men's basketball team represented the University of Michigan in intercollegiate college basketball during the 1926–27 season. The team played its home games at Yost Arena on the school's campus in Ann Arbor, Michigan. The team won the Western Conference Championship outright. The team was led by captain Ed Chambers and All-American Bennie Oosterbaan.

== Schedule ==
1926–27 Overall: 14–3 Big Ten: 10–2 (1st | Champions)

Head Coach: E.J. Mather Staff: Harry Kipke, Frank Cappon & George Veenker

Captain: Edward Chambers Home Arena: Yost Field House (7,500)

Date Opponent W/L Score
12/11/1926 Michigan State W 34–13
12/17/1926 Cornell W 30–23
1/1/1927 Syracuse W 31–27
1/4/1927 Maryland W 39–25
1/8/1927 Minnesota W 31–20
1/15/1927 Iowa W 41–22
1/17/1927 Illinois W 25–24
1/22/1927 Indiana W 31–27
1/24/1927 Minnesota W 32–20
2/12/1927 Pittsburgh L 23–35
2/15/1927 Purdue L 32–37
2/19/1927 Indiana L 34–37
2/22/1927 Chicago W 51–25
2/25/1927 Illinois W 30–26
2/28/1927 Purdue W 42–20
3/5/1927 Chicago W 34–15
3/7/1927 Iowa W 31–29 (OT)

== Players ==
- Samuel Babcock, Detroit, MI
- Albert H. Barley, Marion, IN
- Edward W. Chambers, Niles, MI - team captain, guard, and varsity letter winner
- Lawrence G. Clemmons, Sturgis, MI - forward and aMa letter winner
- Samuel E. Gawne, Lakewood, OH - forwards and aMa letter winner
- Frank Harrigan, Grand Rapids, MI - forward and varsity letter winner
- Franklin C. Kuenzel, Grand Rapids, MI - guard and varsity letter winner
- James F. Martin, Detroit, MI
- Ernie McCoy, Detroit, MI - center and varsity letter winner
- John Molenda, Detroit, MI
- Herman Z. Nyland, Grand Haven, MI - center and aMa letter winner
- Bennie Oosterbaan, Muskegon, MI - forward and varsity letter winner
- Wilbur E. Petrie, Huntington, IN - guards and varsity letter winner
- Nathan N. "Nat" Rasnick, Newark, NJ - forwards and varsity letter winner
- Robert D. Reason, Detroit, MI - guard and aMa letter winner
- Wayne M. Schroeder, Battle Creek, MI - guard and varsity letter winner
- Joe Truskowski, Detroit, MI - guards and varsity letter winner
- John Dallas Whittle, Chicago, IL - forward and aMa letter winner
