= Karl Schlademan =

American sports coach and administrator (1890–1980)

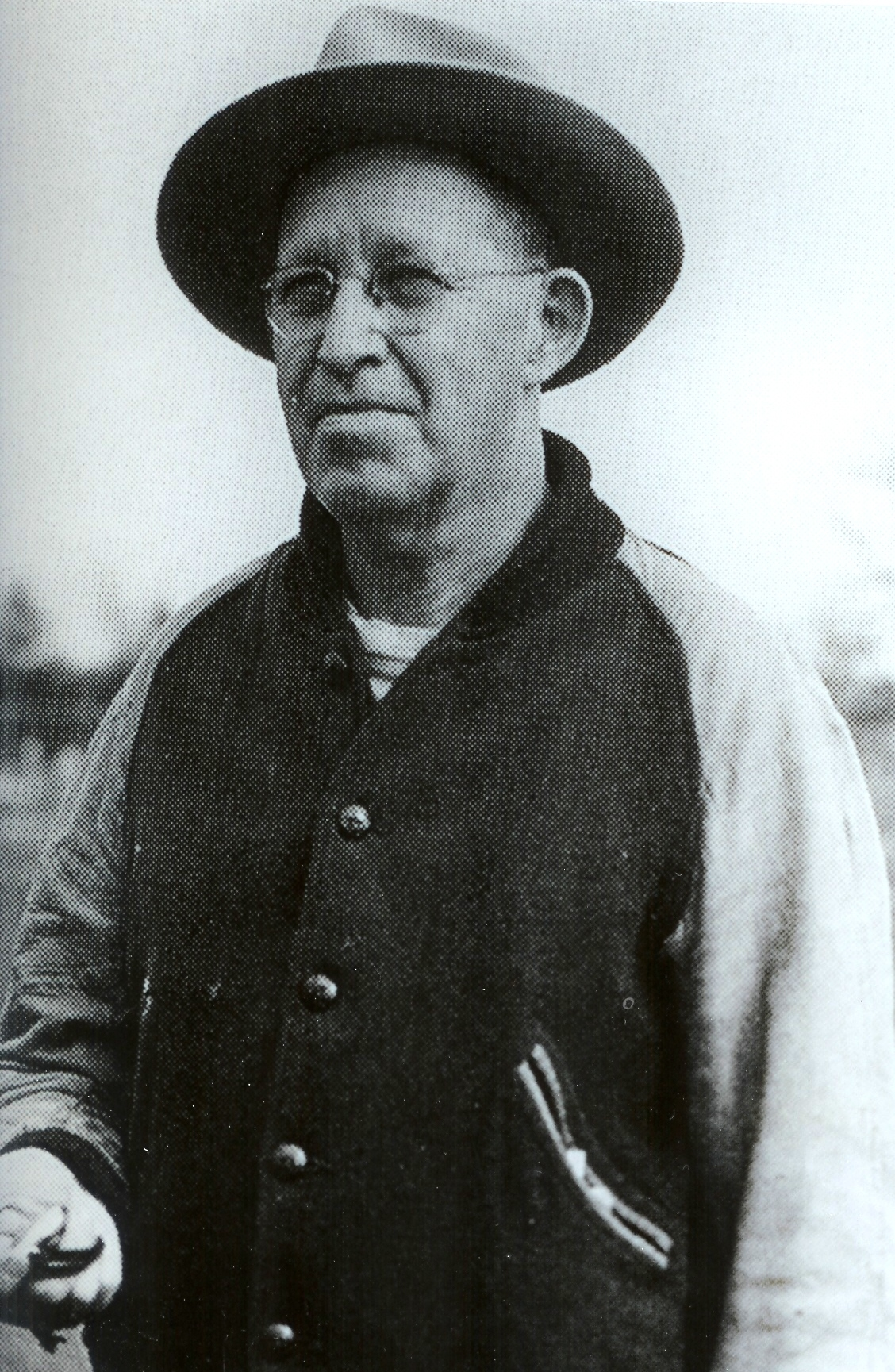
- Schlademan at Michigan State

Biographical details
- Born: February 11, 1890; Seafield, Indiana, U.S.
- Died: December 22, 1980 (aged 90); Fort Wayne, Indiana, U.S.

Playing career

Football
- c. 1910: DePauw

Baseball
- c. 1910: DePauw

Track and field
- c. 1910: DePauw

Coaching career (HC unless noted)

Football
- 1911: Missouri Wesleyan
- 1916–1918: Baker
- 1919: Kansas (freshmen)
- 1920: Kansas (line)

Basketball
- 1916–1919: Baker
- 1919: Kansas (interim HC)
- 1926–1928: Washington State

Track and field
- 1914: DePauw
- 1919–1926: Kansas
- 1926–1940: Washington State
- 1940–1958: Michigan State

Administrative career (AD unless noted)
- 1911–1912: Baker
- 1916–1919: Missouri Wesleyan

Karl L. Schlademan (February 11, 1890 – December 22, 1980) was an American college sports coach and athletics administrator. Principally a track and field coach, Schlademan also coached football, basketball and cross country. He served as the head track and field coach at DePauw University in Greencastle, Indiana in 1914, the University of Kansas from 1919 to 1926, the State College of Washington—now known as Washington State University—from 1926 to 1940, and Michigan State University from 1940 to 1958.

At Kansas, Schlademan was instrumental in the founding of the Kansas Relays and was the Jayhawks' fourth head basketball coach in an interim capacity for the first game of the 1919–20 season for Phog Allen. He spent 18 years at Michigan State, initially as the track and field coach and then later adding cross country to his duties. Schlademan is an inductee into the Drake Relay Hall of Fame, Michigan State University's Athletic Hall of Fame in 1995, U.S. Track & Field and Cross Country Coaches Hall of Fame, and the Washington State University Hall of Fame.

== Early life ==
Born in Seafield, Indiana, Schlademn's ancestry traced back to the Plymouth Colony on his mother's side. His father ran a mercantile and grain business in Seafield, and Karl graduated from Monticello High School, where he was a four-year letterman in both track and basketball. He was captain of the track team.

Schlademan attended DePauw University in Greencastle; he was a member of Delta Kappa Epsilon fraternity, and played football, baseball, and was again a "star trackman." Not having taken up football in high school, Schlademan did well to earn four letters in the sport, and was named on the "All-Western" at the end position. Schlademan was also made captain of the track team, also earning four letters, and added two letters in baseball. Following DePauw, he briefly attended Harvard University Law School between 1912 and 1913. In 1913 he wed Nell Ramsay, whom he met while at Missouri Wesleyan.

== Early coaching career ==
After graduation, Schlademan went to Missouri Wesleyan College at Cameron, and became head coach and athletic director. He stayed there a year and coached a championship football team. Schlademan returned to DePaul in 1914 to serve as track coach. He next coached track at Arizona in 1916. From 1916 to 1919, Schlademan was the athletic director at Baker University in Baldwin. He served as the head coach and produced championship track and basketball teams.

== Kansas ==
In 1919, he took a position at University of Kansas at Lawrence and stayed for seven years. He first took the position as head track mentor and coach of the freshman football team. After the second year, he was made head line coach for the varsity football team, and after his third year at this position the university won the Old Missouri Valley circuit. As the head track coach, his team won two championships. The conference that KU was in at that time is now known as the "Big Six" conference.

In 1919, he coached a single basketball game for the 1919–20 season before Phog Allen took over.

While at Kansas, Schlademan worked alongside John H. Outland and Phog Allen to start the Kansas Relays. At the direction of Allen, Schlademan worked with student managers to organize the first event 0 years ago in 1923. Over the years, the Kansas relays have attracted runners, throwers, and jumpers from all over the United States, with athletes ranging from Olympians to high school runners. Olympians such as Marion Jones and Maurice Greene competed in the Gold Zone portion of the meet, which attracts thousands of spectators to the relays every year. At the first relays, Schlademan's team, taken together, was sufficient to make the hosting team "the big feature of its own affair" and to secure the inaugural Kansas Relays' title.

== Washington State ==
In the fall of 1926, Schlademan departed for Washington State College in Pullman, and was also the head coach in basketball for the first two years. He steadily built the Cougar track team of the Pacific Coast Conference into a national contender. Washington State had four top-10 finishes at the NCAA championships, including a pair of fourth-place finishes (1937 and 1939). The Cougars won seven consecutive Northern Division titles and had a 39–14 dual meet record under Schlademan; his Cougar relay team set a world record in June 1937. Washington State sprinter Lee Orr, a 1936 Olympian for Canada, won a national collegiate title in the 440-yard dash in 1940, Schlademan's final season in Pullman. While in Pullman, Schlademan also served as the sixth President of the coaches association from 1939 to 1940. He resigned his position in September 1940 when he took the position at Michigan State.

== Michigan State ==
After 14 years on the Palouse of southeastern Washington, Schlademan went east in 1940 to Michigan State College in East Lansing. Schlademan's son, Karl, surmised his father accepted the job for a number of reasons including a close relationship with Athletic Director Ralph Young, the attractiveness of the newly completed Jenison Fieldhouse, a deep respect for the track programs of the Midwest, and an increase of salary from $4,000 to $7,500.

He became track coach in 1941 and took over cross country in 1947. From then until his retirement in 1959, Schlademan led the Spartans to seven Big Ten championships and 11 national championships—six NCAA and five IC4A (1948–49, 1952, and 1955–56)--in cross country. The Spartans also finished as runners-up in 1950 and 1957. In track, he expanded the Michigan State relays and coached 25 individual Big Ten champions and 4 NCAA individual champions. He won three IC4A titles and produced a number of Olympian distance runners. Schlademan coached olympians such as David Lean, a silver medalist in the 1956 Olympics.

== Retirement and later years ==
After retiring from Michigan State, Schlademan sold Adidas footwear in Lansing, Michigan. In his later years, he moved to Fort Wayne, Indiana, where he resided until his death on December 22, 1980.

== Personal life ==
Schlademan married Nell Ramsay in 1913. They met while he was at Missouri Wesleyan, where she was a student. They had two children, Karl Ramsay and Sarah. He and Nell were married for over 67 years.

== Career achievements ==
=== Track championships ===
- 11 National championships
- Coached 25 individual Big Ten champions
- 7 Big Ten championships
- 2 Big Six championships

=== Honors ===
- Drake Relay Hall of Fame - Inducted 1988
- Michigan State University Athletics Hall of Fame - Class of 1995
- U.S. Track & Field and Cross Country Coaches Hall of Fame - Class of 2007
- Washington State University Hall of Fame - Class of 2011

== Head coaching record ==
=== Football ===
Year	Team	Overall	Conference	Standing	Bowl/playoffs
Missouri Wesleyan Owls (Independent) (1911)
1911	Missouri Wesleyan				
Missouri Wesleyan:					
Baker Wildcats (Kansas Collegiate Athletic Conference) (1916–1918)
1916	Baker	4–4–1	4–2–1	T–6th	
1917	Baker	3–5–1	3–4–1	9th	
1918	Baker	0–5			
Baker:		7–14–2			
Total:					
