= 1926–27 Iowa State Cyclones men's basketball team =

American college basketball season

1926–27 Iowa State Cyclones men's basketball
- Conference: Missouri Valley Intercollegiate Athletic Association
- Record: 9–9 (7–8 MVIAA)
- Head coach: Bill Chandler (6th season)
- Home arena: State Gymnasium

1926–27 Missouri Valley Intercollegiate Athletic Association men's basketball standings
	Conf.				Overall
Team	W		L	PCT	W		L	PCT
Kansas	10	–	2	.833	15	–	2	.882
Oklahoma	8	–	4	.667	12	–	5	.706
Missouri	6	–	4	.600	9	–	8	.529
Nebraska	7	–	5	.583	12	–	6	.667
Kansas State	6	–	6	.500	10	–	8	.556
Oklahoma A&M	6	–	6	.500	8	–	9	.471
Drake	6	–	6	.500	8	–	10	.444
Iowa State	7	–	8	.467	9	–	9	.500
Washington University	2	–	8	.200	5	–	10	.333
Grinnell	2	–	10	.167	2	–	15	.118

The 1926–27 Iowa State Cyclones men's basketball team (also known informally as Ames) represented Iowa State University during the 1926–27 NCAA men's basketball season. The Cyclones were coached by Bill Chandler, who was in his sixth season with the Cyclones. They played their home games at the State Gymnasium in Ames, Iowa.

They finished the season 9–9, 7–8 in Missouri Valley Intercollegiate Athletic Association play to finish in eighth place.

== Roster ==
1926–27 Iowa State Cyclones men's basketball team
Players
Coaches

Pos.	#	Name	Height	Weight	Year	Hometown
		Brown	—	—
		Laurence Coomer	—	—	Jr
F		Earl Elliott	—	—	Sr	Ames, Iowa
C		Herman Fennema	—	—	Sr	Monroe, Iowa
		L.W. Grimes	—	—	Jr
		V.S. Hall	—	—	Jr
		G.B. Hay	—	—	Jr
G		Freddy Kling	—	—	Jr
		Harold Klingaman	—	—	Sr	Waterloo, Iowa
		Lester Lande	—	—	Jr	Northwood, Iowa
		Fred Ludwig	—	—	So	Lawton, Iowa
		C.J. McMurrin	—	—	Jr
		Aaron Miller (C)	—	—	Sr	Waterloo, Iowa
		Max Stayer	—	—	Jr
C		Joe Wagner	—	—	So

Head coach

- Bill Chandler

Assistant coach(es)

Legend

- (C) Team captain
- (S) Suspended
- (I) Ineligible
- (W) Walk-on
- Injured
- Current redshirt

== Schedule and results ==
Date time, TV	Rank^{#}	Opponent^{#}	Result	Record	Site city, state
Regular season
December 22, 1926*		Simpson	W 24–19	1–0	State Gymnasium; Ames, Iowa
January 3, 1927*		at Chicago	W 28–18	2–0	Bartlett Gymnasium; Chicago
January 7, 1927		Oklahoma	L 29–32	2–1 (0–1)	State Gymnasium; Ames, Iowa
January 8, 1927		Oklahoma A&M	W 40–21	3–1 (1–1)	State Gymnasium; Ames, Iowa
January 14, 1927		at Kansas State	L 24–31	3–2 (1–2)	Nichols Hall; Manhattan, Kansas
January 15, 1927		at Kansas	W 15–12	4–2 (2–2)	Robinson Gymnasium; Lawrence, Kansas
January 17, 1927		at Grinnell	W 22–19	5–2 (3–2)	Grinnell, Iowa
January 21, 1927		at Oklahoma A&M	L 19–42	5–3 (3–3)	Armory-Gymnasium; Stillwater, Oklahoma
January 22, 1927		at Oklahoma	L 21–36	5–4 (3–4)	Norman, Oklahoma
January 26, 1927; 8:00 pm		at Drake; Iowa Big Four	L 29–43	5–5 (3–5)	Drake Fieldhouse; Des Moines, Iowa
January 29, 1927		at Nebraska	L 19–35	5–6 (3–6)	Nebraska Coliseum; Lincoln, Nebraska
January 31, 1927*		at Creighton	L 21–25	5–7	University Gym; Omaha, Nebraska
February 3, 1927		Grinnell	W 33–29	6–7 (4–6)	State Gymnasium; Ames, Iowa
February 9, 1927		Drake; Iowa Big Four	W 26–21	7–7 (5–6)	State Gymnasium; Ames, Iowa
February 14, 1927		Kansas	L 16–27	7–8 (5–7)	State Gymnasium; Ames, Iowa
February 18, 1927; 8:30 pm		at Drake; Iowa Big Four	L 20–23	7–9 (5–8)	Drake Fieldhouse; Des Moines, Iowa
February 25, 1927		Kansas State	W 36–23	8–9 (6–8)	State Gymnasium; Ames, Iowa
March 3, 1927		Nebraska	W 26–24	9–9 (7–8)	State Gymnasium; Ames, Iowa
*Non-conference game. ^{#}Rankings from AP poll. (#) Tournament seedings in parentheses. All times are in Central Time.
