= 1926–27 Kansas Jayhawks men's basketball team =

American college basketball season

1926–27 Kansas Jayhawks men's basketball

MVIAA Champions
- Conference: Missouri Valley Intercollegiate Athletic Association
- Record: 15–2 (10–2 MVIAA)
- Head coach: Phog Allen (10th season)
- Assistant coach: John Bunn (6th season)
- Captain: Harold Schmidt
- Home arena: Robinson Gymnasium

1926–27 Missouri Valley Intercollegiate Athletic Association men's basketball standings
	Conf.				Overall
Team	W		L	PCT	W		L	PCT
Kansas	10	–	2	.833	15	–	2	.882
Oklahoma	8	–	4	.667	12	–	5	.706
Missouri	6	–	4	.600	9	–	8	.529
Nebraska	7	–	5	.583	12	–	6	.667
Kansas State	6	–	6	.500	10	–	8	.556
Oklahoma A&M	6	–	6	.500	8	–	9	.471
Drake	6	–	6	.500	8	–	10	.444
Iowa State	7	–	8	.467	9	–	9	.500
Washington University	2	–	8	.200	5	–	10	.333
Grinnell	2	–	10	.167	2	–	15	.118

The 1926–27 Kansas Jayhawks men's basketball team represented the University of Kansas during the 1926–27 college men's basketball season.

== Roster ==
- Glenn Burton
- Gale Gordon
- James Hill
- Balfour Jeffrey
- Leo Lattin
- Robert Maney
- Carmen Newland
- Albert Peterson
- Harold Schmidt

== Schedule ==
Date time, TV	Rank^{#}	Opponent^{#}	Result	Record	Site city, state
January 3*		at Creighton	W 31–29	1-0	University Gym; Omaha, NE
January 4		Drake	W 27–13	2-0	Drake Fieldhouse; Des Moines, IA
January 8		at Washington University (MO)	W 31–15	3-0 (1-0)	Francis Gymnasium; St. Louis, MO
January 12*		at Kansas City AC	W 27–21	4-0	Clubhouse; Kansas City, MO
January 15		Iowa State	L 12–15	4-1 (1-1)	Robinson Gymnasium; Lawrence, KS
January 19		Nebraska	L 24–27	4-2 (1-2)	Robinson Gymnasium; Lawrence, KS
January 29		at Missouri; Border War	W 40–23	5-2 (2-2)	Rothwell Gymnasium; Columbia, MO
February 1		at Hillyard Chemical Co.	W 30–27	6-2	St. Joseph, MO
February 9		at Kansas State; Sunflower Showdown	W 35–34	7-2 (3-2)	Nichols Hall; Manhattan, KS
February 12		at Grinnell	W 41–19	8-2 (4-2)	Grinnell, IA
February 14		at Iowa State	W 27–16	9-2 (5-2)	State Gymnasium; Ames, IA
February 18		Grinnell	W 36–16	10-2 (6-2)	Robinson Gymnasium; Lawrence, KS
February 21		Washington University (MO)	W 27–18	11-2 (7-2)	Robinson Gymnasium; Lawrence, KS
February 26		Nebraska	W 34–25	12-2 (8-2)	Robinson Gymnasium; Lawrence, KS
February 28*		at Kansas City AC	W 32–28	13-2	Clubhouse; Kansas City, MO
March 2		Missouri; Border War	W 36–29	14-2 (9-2)	Robinson Gymnasium; Lawrence, KS
March 4		Kansas State; Sunflower Showdown	W 29–24	15-2 (10-2)	Robinson Gymnasium; Lawrence, KS
*Non-conference game. ^{#}Rankings from AP Poll. (#) Tournament seedings in parentheses.
