= 1926–27 Washington Huskies men's basketball team =

American college basketball season

1926–27 Washington Huskies men's basketball
- Conference: Pacific Coast Conference
- Record: 15–4 (7–3 PCC)
- Head coach: Hec Edmundson (7th season)
- Captain: Al Schuss

1926–27 Pacific Coast Conference men's basketball standings
	Conf.				Overall
Team	W		L	PCT	W		L	PCT
North
Oregon	8	–	2	.800	24	–	4	.857
Washington	7	–	3	.700	15	–	4	.789
Idaho	7	–	3	.700	24	–	7	.774
Oregon Agricultural	4	–	6	.400	14	–	11	.560
Washington State	3	–	7	.300	11	–	10	.524
Montana	1	–	9	.100	5	–	11	.313
South
California †	5	–	0	1.000	13	–	0	1.000
Stanford	3	–	2	.600	9	–	9	.500
USC	0	–	6	.000	10	–	8	.556
† Conference playoff series winner

The 1926–27 Washington Huskies men's basketball team represented the University of Washington for the 1926–27 NCAA college basketball season. Led by seventh-year head coach Hec Edmundson, the Huskies were members of the Pacific Coast Conference and played their home games on campus in Seattle, Washington.

The Huskies were 15–4 overall in the regular season and 7–3 in conference play; tied for second place in the Northern division. In the season finale at Oregon, Washington defeated the division-winning Webfoots.
