= 1926–27 Idaho Vandals men's basketball team =

American college basketball season

1926–27 Idaho Vandals men's basketball
- Conference: Pacific Coast Conference
- Record: 24–7 (7–3 PCC)
- Head coach: Dave MacMillan (7th season)
- Assistant coach: Gale Mix
- Home arena: Armory and Gymnasium

1926–27 Pacific Coast Conference men's basketball standings
	Conf.				Overall
Team	W		L	PCT	W		L	PCT
North
Oregon	8	–	2	.800	24	–	4	.857
Washington	7	–	3	.700	15	–	4	.789
Idaho	7	–	3	.700	24	–	7	.774
Oregon Agricultural	4	–	6	.400	14	–	11	.560
Washington State	3	–	7	.300	11	–	10	.524
Montana	1	–	9	.100	5	–	11	.313
South
California †	5	–	0	1.000	13	–	0	1.000
Stanford	3	–	2	.600	9	–	9	.500
USC	0	–	6	.000	10	–	8	.556
† Conference playoff series winner

The 1926–27 Idaho Vandals men's basketball team represented the University of Idaho during the 1926–27 NCAA college basketball season. Members of the Pacific Coast Conference, the Vandals were led by seventh-year head coach Dave MacMillan and played their home games on campus at the Armory and Gymnasium in Moscow, Idaho.

The Vandals were 24–7 overall and 7–3 in conference play.

After the season, MacMillan departed for Minnesota of the Big Ten Conference, and was succeeded by alumnus Rich Fox, who coached Pocatello High School to the state title in 1927 (over Moscow in Moscow) and led the Vandals for nine seasons.

This was the penultimate season for varsity basketball at the Armory and Gymnasium as the Memorial Gymnasium opened in November 1928. The older building became the women's gym, and continues today as Art and Architecture South.
