= 1926–27 Washington State Cougars men's basketball team =

American college basketball season

1926–27 Washington State Cougars men's basketball
- Conference: Pacific Coast Conference
- Record: 11–10 (3–7 PCC)
- Head coach: Karl Schlademan (1st season)

1926–27 Pacific Coast Conference men's basketball standings
	Conf.				Overall
Team	W		L	PCT	W		L	PCT
North
Oregon	8	–	2	.800	24	–	4	.857
Washington	7	–	3	.700	15	–	4	.789
Idaho	7	–	3	.700	24	–	7	.774
Oregon Agricultural	4	–	6	.400	14	–	11	.560
Washington State	3	–	7	.300	11	–	10	.524
Montana	1	–	9	.100	5	–	11	.313
South
California †	5	–	0	1.000	13	–	0	1.000
Stanford	3	–	2	.600	9	–	9	.500
USC	0	–	6	.000	10	–	8	.556
† Conference playoff series winner

The 1926–27 Washington State Cougars men's basketball team represented Washington State College for the 1926–27 college basketball season. Led by first-year head coach Karl Schlademan, the Cougars were members of the Pacific Coast Conference and played their home games on campus in Pullman, Washington.

The Cougars were 11–10 overall in the regular season and 3–7 in conference play, fifth in the Northern division.

Previously at the University of Kansas, Schlademan was the track and field coach for the Cougars until 1940, but was head basketball coach for only two seasons. He took over from Fred Bohler, then was succeeded in 1928 by alumnus Jack Friel, who led Washington State as head coach for three decades.
