= 1926–27 Notre Dame Fighting Irish men's basketball team =

American college basketball season

1926–27 Notre Dame Fighting Irish men's basketball

Helms Foundation National Champions
- Conference: Independent
- Record: 19–1
- Head coach: George Keogan (4th season)
- Captain: John Nyikos
- Home arena: Notre Dame Fieldhouse

The 1926–27 Notre Dame Fighting Irish men's basketball team represented the University of Notre Dame during the 1926–27 NCAA men's basketball season in the United States. The head coach was George Keogan, coaching in his fourth season with the Fighting Irish. The team finished the season with a 19–1 record and were named national champions by the Helms Athletic Foundation. Captain John Nyikos was named a consensus All-American at the end of the season as well.

== Schedule and results ==
Date time, TV	Rank^{#}	Opponent^{#}	Result	Record	Site city, state
Regular season
12/6/1926*		Armour Institute	W 51–14	1–0	Notre Dame Fieldhouse; South Bend, IN
12/11/1926*		Earlham	W 42–14	2–0	Notre Dame Fieldhouse; South Bend, IN
12/18/1926*		at Minnesota	W 24–19	3–0	Kenwood Armory; Minneapolis, MN
12/20/1926*		at Iowa	W 19–18	4–0	Iowa City, IA
12/30/1926*		Northwestern	W 28–20	5–0	Notre Dame Fieldhouse; South Bend, IN
1/3/1927*		at Northwestern	W 27–20	6–0	Old Patten Gymnasium; Evanston, IL
1/8/1927*		Detroit	W 41–24	7–0	Notre Dame Fieldhouse; South Bend, IN
1/14/1927*		at Franklin	L 22–34	7–1	Franklin, IN
1/22/1927*		Wabash	W 37–26	8–1	Notre Dame Fieldhouse; South Bend, IN
1/19/1927*		Michigan State	W 36–15	9–1	Notre Dame Fieldhouse; South Bend, IN
2/4/1927*		at Marquette	W 27–21	10–1	Old Gym; Milwaukee, WI
2/8/1927*		at Wisconsin	W 19–14	11–1	Red Gym; Madison, WI
2/12/1927*		Franklin	W 36–16	12–1	Notre Dame Fieldhouse; South Bend, IN
2/16/1927*		at Wabash	W 35–25	13–1	Crawfordsville, IN
2/19/1927*		Pittsburgh	W 33–17	14–1	Notre Dame Fieldhouse; South Bend, IN
2/22/1927*		at Detroit	W 24–23	15–1	Detroit, MI
2/23/1927*		at Michigan State	W 34–22	16–1	Jenison Fieldhouse; East Lansing, MI
2/26/1927*		at Marquette	W 33–13	17–1	Old Gym; Milwaukee, WI
3/4/1927*		at Creighton	W 31–20	18–1	University Gymnasium; Omaha, NE
3/5/1927*		at Creighton	W 32–16	19–1	University Gymnasium; Omaha, NE
*Non-conference game. ^{#}Rankings from AP Poll. (#) Tournament seedings in parentheses.
