= 1926–27 Indiana Hoosiers men's basketball team =

American college basketball season

1926–27 Indiana Hoosiers men's basketball
- Conference: Big Ten Conference
- Record: 13–4 (9–3 Big Ten)
- Head coach: Everett Dean (3rd season)
- Captain: Julius Krueger
- Home arena: Men's Gymnasium

1926–27 Big Ten Conference men's basketball standings
	Conf.				Overall
Team	W		L	PCT	W		L	PCT
Michigan	10	–	2	.833	14	–	3	.824
Indiana	9	–	3	.750	13	–	4	.765
Purdue	9	–	3	.750	12	–	5	.706
Illinois	7	–	5	.583	10	–	7	.588
Wisconsin	7	–	5	.583	10	–	7	.588
Iowa	7	–	5	.583	9	–	8	.529
Ohio State	6	–	6	.500	11	–	6	.647
Chicago	3	–	9	.250	6	–	11	.353
Minnesota	1	–	11	.083	3	–	13	.188
Northwestern	1	–	11	.083	3	–	14	.176

The 1926–27 Indiana Hoosiers men's basketball team represented Indiana University. Their head coach was Everett Dean, who was in his 3rd year. The team played its home games at the Men's Gymnasium in Bloomington, Indiana, and was a member of the Big Ten Conference.

The Hoosiers finished the regular season with an overall record of 13–4 and a conference record of 9–3, finishing 2nd in the Big Ten Conference.

== Roster ==
No.	Name	Position	Ht.	Year	Hometown
3	Art Beckner	F	6–1	Sr.	Muncie, Indiana
4	Robert Correll	G	6–1	Jr.	Bloomington, Indiana
5	Dale Wells	F	6–1	So.	LaPorte, Indiana
8	Maurice Starr	F	6–1	Jr.	Anderson, Indiana
9	Carl Scheid	G	6–1	So.	Vincennes, Indiana
10	Ed Farmer	C	6–4	Jr.	Bloomington, Indiana
13	James Gill	G	6–2	So.	Washington, Indiana
15	Harold Anderson	F	N/A	So.	Lapel, Indiana
15	John Leonard	C	6–4	So.	Rochester, Indiana
18	Charles Benzel	G	5–8	Sr.	Bedford, Indiana
N/A	Harold Derr	F	5–8	Jr.	Huntington, Indiana
N/A	Julius Krueger	F	6–1	Sr.	Bloomington, Indiana
N/A	Frank Sibley	C	6–2	Sr.	Gary, Indiana
N/A	Jack Winston	G	6–6	Sr.	Washington, Indiana

== Schedule/results ==
Date time, TV	Rank^{#}	Opponent^{#}	Result	Record	Site city, state
Regular season
12/10/1926*		DePauw	W 44–30	1–0	Men's Gymnasium; Bloomington, Indiana
12/16/1926*		Franklin College	W 37–17	2–0	Men's Gymnasium; Bloomington, Indiana
12/21/1926*		at Kentucky; Indiana–Kentucky rivalry	W 38–19	3–0	Alumni Gymnasium; Lexington, Kentucky
1/4/1927*		Carleton	W 31–29	4–0	Men's Gymnasium; Bloomington, Indiana
1/8/1927		at Wisconsin	W 28–23	5–0 (1–0)	Red Gym; Madison, Wisconsin
1/10/1927		at Minnesota	W 37–24	6–0 (2–0)	Kenwood Armory; Minneapolis
1/17/1927		at Northwestern	W 36–24	7–0 (3–0)	Old Patten Gymnasium; Evanston, Illinois
1/22/1927		Michigan	L 27–31	7–1 (3–1)	Men's Gymnasium; Bloomington, Indiana
1/29/1927		Chicago	W 28–23	8–1 (4–1)	Men's Gymnasium; Bloomington, Indiana
2/5/1927		at Chicago	L 21–25	8–2 (4–2)	Bartlett Gymnasium; Chicago
2/7/1927		Minnesota	W 42–16	9–2 (5–2)	Men's Gymnasium; Bloomington, Indiana
2/12/1927*		Wabash	L 33–35	9–3 (5–2)	Men's Gymnasium; Bloomington, Indiana
2/19/1927		at Michigan	W 37–34	10–3 (6–2)	Yost Field House; Ann Arbor, Michigan
2/22/1927		Ohio State	L 18–27	10–4 (6–3)	Men's Gymnasium; Bloomington, Indiana
2/26/1927		Wisconsin	W 31–23	11–4 (7–3)	Men's Gymnasium; Bloomington, Indiana
3/5/1927		Northwestern	W 44–25	12–4 (8–3)	Men's Gymnasium; Bloomington, Indiana
3/9/1927		at Ohio State	W 36–31	13–4 (9–3)	Ohio Expo Center Coliseum; Columbus, Ohio
*Non-conference game. ^{#}Rankings from AP Poll. (#) Tournament seedings in parentheses.
