= 1927 Southern Conference men's basketball tournament =

- Classification: Division I
- Teams: 14
- Site: Municipal Auditorium; Atlanta, GA
- Champions: Vanderbilt Commodores (1st title)
- Winning coach: Josh Cody (1st title)
- Top scorer: Jim Stuart (Vanderbilt) (64 points)

1926–27 Southern Conference men's basketball standings
	Conf.				Overall
Team	W		L	PCT	W		L	PCT
South Carolina	9	–	1	.900	14	–	4	.778
Vanderbilt†	7	–	1	.875	20	–	4	.833
Georgia Tech	8	–	2	.800	17	–	10	.630
Auburn	12	–	4	.750	13	–	6	.684
Washington and Lee	6	–	2	.750	10	–	6	.625
Mississippi	10	–	4	.714	13	–	5	.722
NC State	5	–	2	.714	12	–	5	.706
North Carolina	7	–	3	.700	17	–	7	.708
Maryland	6	–	4	.600	10	–	10	.500
Mississippi A&M	7	–	5	.583	17	–	7	.708
Tennessee	5	–	4	.556	7	–	12	.368
Alabama	4	–	5	.444	5	–	8	.385
Virginia	5	–	7	.417	9	–	10	.474
Tulane	7	–	10	.412	7	–	10	.412
LSU	3	–	5	.375	7	–	9	.438
Georgia	3	–	6	.333	14	–	8	.636
Virginia Tech	2	–	6	.250	6	–	8	.429
Kentucky	1	–	6	.143	3	–	13	.188
Clemson	1	–	7	.125	2	–	13	.133
Florida	1	–	8	.111	6	–	20	.231
VMI	0	–	7	.000	4	–	11	.267
Sewanee	0	–	10	.000	3	–	11	.214
† Southern Conference Tournament winner

The 1927 Southern Conference men's basketball tournament took place from February 25–March 1, 1927, at Municipal Auditorium in Atlanta, Georgia. The Vanderbilt Commodores won their first Southern Conference title, led by head coach Josh Cody.

== Bracket ==
First round February 25
Maryland	Bye
Georgia	36
VMI	14
VPI	33
Auburn	38
Tennessee	17
North Carolina	32
South Carolina	32
NC State	26
Georgia Tech	40
Mississippi State	24
Vanderbilt	44
Washington and Lee	32
Mississippi	Bye

Quarterfinals; February 26
Maryland	22
Georgia	27
Auburn	13
North Carolina	28
South Carolina	32
Georgia Tech	18
Vanderbilt	32
Mississippi	20

Semifinals; February 28
Georgia	23
North Carolina	20
South Carolina	25
Vanderbilt	31

Finals; March 1
Georgia	44
Vanderbilt	46

* Overtime game

=== Championship ===
March 1

Georgia 44, Vanderbilt 46
Pts: George Keen 18	Pts: Jim Stuart 19

Municipal Auditorium, Atlanta, Georgia
Referees: Sutton

== All-Southern tournament team ==
Player	Position	Class	Team
John McCall	G	Senior	Vanderbilt
Walter Forbes	G	Senior	Georgia
George Keen	F	Senior	Georgia
Paul Dear	F	Junior	VPI
Jim Stuart	C	Junior	Vanderbilt

== See also ==
- List of Southern Conference men's basketball champions
