= Ross McBurney =

American basketball player (1906–1988)

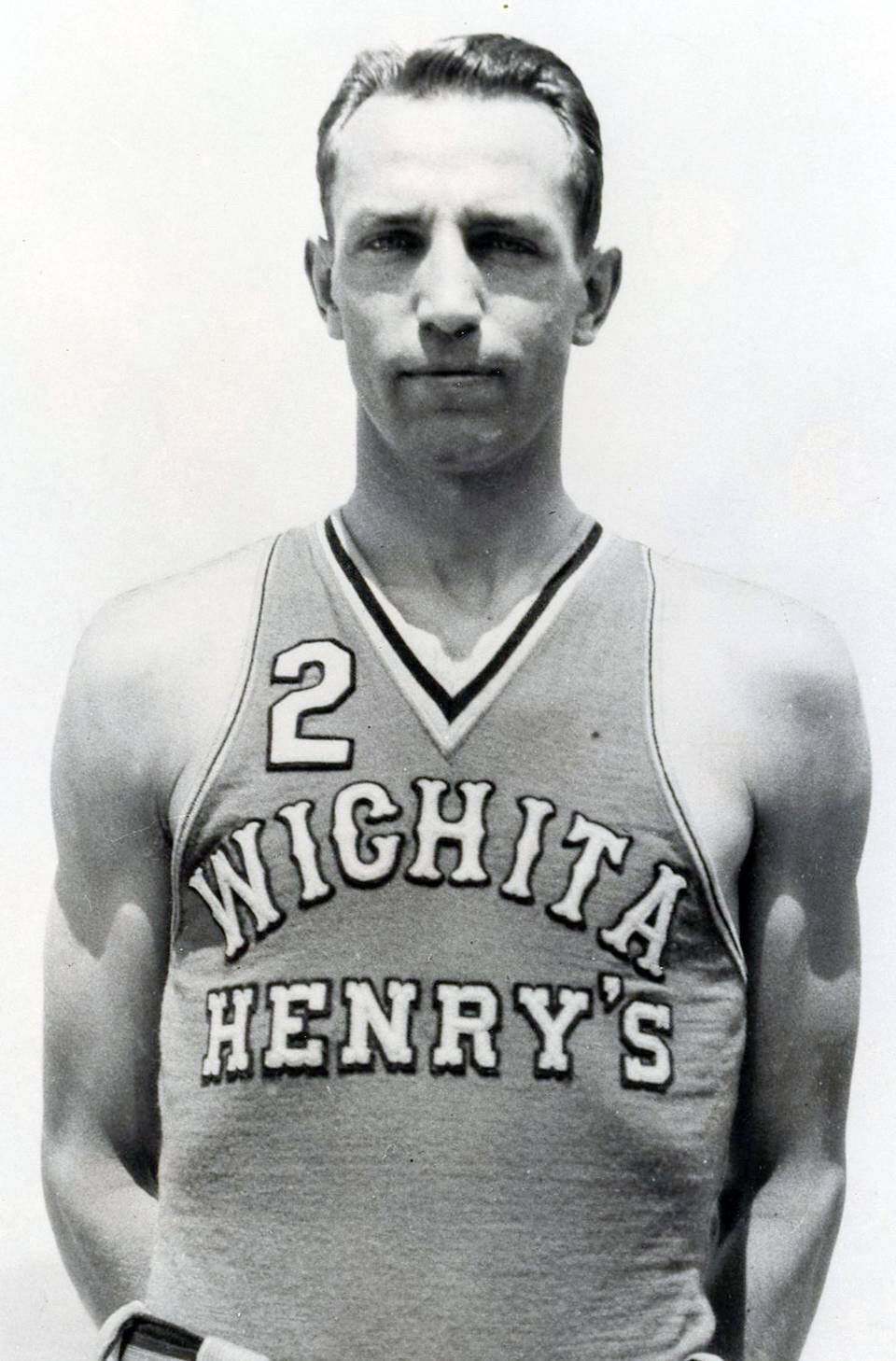
- McBurney with Wichita Henry's Clothiers.

Personal information
- Born: July 29, 1906
- Died: July 4, 1988 (aged 81)
- Listed height: 6 ft 5 in (1.96 m)

Career information
- High school: Wichita East (Wichita, Kansas)
- College: Wichita State (1926–1929)
- Position: Center

Career history
- 1929–1933: Wichita Henry's Clothiers
- 1933–1934: Ogden
- 1934–1935: Hutchinson, Kansas
- 1935–?: Golden State Creamery

Career highlights
- Helms Foundation All-American (1927); 2x AAU All-American (1927, 1929)

Ross Clayton McBurney (July 29, 1906 – July 4, 1988) was an American basketball player. A 6'5" center, McBurney attended Wichita East High School, where he led the team to a national high school championship in 1925. He then attended Wichita State University from 1926 to 1929, where he became the school's first basketball All-American in 1927. That year he led the Shockers to a 19-2 record and a third-place finish in the Amateur Athletic Union tournament. He was also named to the AAU All-American team that year.

Following his college career, McBurney had a long and successful AAU career. He went to 10 AAU championship tournaments, winning three consecutive national titles with Henry's Clothiers of Wichita in 1930 to 1932 and again earning AAU All-American honors in 1929. After five seasons with Henry's, McBurney played for Ogden, Hutchinson, Kansas and Golden State Creamery of Oakland, California.
