= 1926–27 Niagara Purple Eagles men's basketball team =

American college basketball season

1926–27 Niagara Purple Eagles men's basketball
- Conference: Independent
- Record: 8–7
- Head coach: Pete Dwyer (4th season)

The 1926–27 Niagara Purple Eagles men's basketball team represented Niagara University during the 1926–27 NCAA college men's basketball season. The head coach was Pete Dwyer, coaching his fourth season with the Purple Eagles.

== Schedule ==
Date time, TV	Opponent	Result	Record	Site city, state
	Buffalo Normal	W 35–16	1–0	Lewiston, NY
	Alfred	W 29–26	2–0	Lewiston, NY
	Toronto	W 37–23	3–0	Lewiston, NY
1/25/1925	Tuscarora Indians	W 40–19	4–0	Lewisburg, NY
	Buffalo	L 21–32	4–1	Lewiston, NY
1/23/1927	St. Bonaventure	L 22–25	4–2	Lewiston, NY
	Alfred	W 30–24	5–2	Lewiston, NY
1/31/1927	Syracuse	L 23–29	5–3	Lewiston, NY
	Colgate	L 26–32	5–4	Lewisburg, NY
	Tuscarora Indians	W 21–15	6–4	Lewisburg, NY
	St. Lawrence	W 23–20	7–4	Lewiston, NY
	Clarkson Tech	L 13–33	7–5	Lewiston, NY
	Clarkson Tech	W 35–34	8–5	Lewiston, NY
	Buffalo	L 17–30	8–6	Lewiston, NY
2/27/1927	at St. Bonaventure	L 17–26	8–7	Butler Gym; Olean, NY
*Non-conference game. (#) Tournament seedings in parentheses.
