= 1926–27 Illinois Fighting Illini men's basketball team =

American college basketball season

1926–27 Illinois Fighting Illini men's basketball
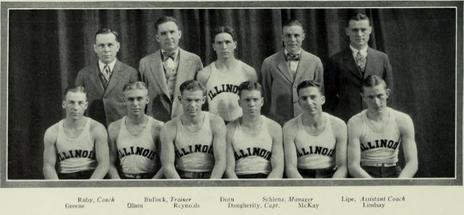
- Conference: Big Ten Conference
- Record: 10–7 (7–5 Big Ten)
- Head coach: J. Craig Ruby (5th season)
- Assistant coach: Jack Lipe (3rd season)
- Captain: Russell Daugherity
- Home arena: Huff Hall

1926–27 Big Ten Conference men's basketball standings
	Conf.				Overall
Team	W		L	PCT	W		L	PCT
Michigan	10	–	2	.833	14	–	3	.824
Indiana	9	–	3	.750	13	–	4	.765
Purdue	9	–	3	.750	12	–	5	.706
Illinois	7	–	5	.583	10	–	7	.588
Wisconsin	7	–	5	.583	10	–	7	.588
Iowa	7	–	5	.583	9	–	8	.529
Ohio State	6	–	6	.500	11	–	6	.647
Chicago	3	–	9	.250	6	–	11	.353
Minnesota	1	–	11	.083	3	–	13	.188
Northwestern	1	–	11	.083	3	–	14	.176

The 1926–27 Illinois Fighting Illini men's basketball team represented the University of Illinois.

== Regular season ==
Craig Ruby entered his fifth season as head coach of the Fighting Illini. This team returned only five letterman from a team that placed in a tie for fifth place in the Big Ten a year earlier. Slightly improved, the team finished with an overall record of 10 wins and 7 losses. In the conference they finished with 7 wins and 5 losses. The starting lineup included captain Russell Daugherity at forward, Ernest Dorn and Robert Greene rotating at the other forward slot, Robert McKay and K.L. Reynolds at guard, and F.H. Lindsay at center.

=== Roster ===
1926–27 Illinois Fighting Illini men's basketball team
Players
Coaches

Pos.	#	Name	Height	Weight	Year	Hometown
F	1	Russell Daugherity (C)	—	—	Sr	Streator, Illinois
F	2	Ernest Dorn	—	—	So	Chicago, Illinois
C	3	Forrest H. Lindsay	—	—	So	Tulsa, Oklahoma
F	4	George Rea	—	—	So	Urbana, Illinois
G	5	C. Donnelly Gamble	—	—	So	Champaign, Illinois
G	6	Kenneth L. Reynolds	—	—	Sr	Villa Grove, Illinois
F	6	John D. How	—	—	So	Lakeville, Indiana
G	7	James R. Stewart	—	—	Jr	Oak Park, Illinois
C	8	Rufus Glass	—	—	So	Kokomo, Indiana
F	9	John Tarwain	—	—	So	Sesser, Illinois
F	10	William Bunn	—	—	Jr	Byron, Illinois
G	11	Herbert G. Lind	—	—	So	Chicago, Illinois
G	12	Robert McKay	—	—	Sr	Champaign, Illinois
G	14	Stoughton LeRoy Reeder	—	—	So	Tuscola, Illinois
F	14	Omar C. Lee	—	—	Jr	Frankfort, Illinois
F	15	William Lincoln Julian	—	—	So	Grant Park, Illinois
G	16	Theodore J. Wachowski	—	—	So	Chicago, Illinois
G	17	Earl Drew	—	—	So	Champaign, Illinois
F	18	Werner Daib	—	—	Jr	Chicago, Illinois
F	19	Robert Greene	—	—	So	Renovo, Pennsylvania
G	20	Carl Elmer Westmark	—	—	So	Chicago, Illinois
F	21	Vance Cummins	—	—	So	Joliet, Illinois
G	22	Everette Olson	—	—	Jr	Champaign, Illinois
F	R	Frank H. Beinhauer	—	—	Jr	Des Moines, Iowa
G	R	Leonard L. Hawkins	—	—	Sr	Champaign, Illinois
F	R	Robert Klaus	—	—	So	Eureka, Illinois
F	R	Harry Lambert Logan	—	—	So	Salem, Illinois
F	R	Roland Sanford Wachob	—	—	So	Indiana, Pennsylvania
G	R	Henry Thomas Winterbauer	—	—	So	Athens, Illinois

Head coach

- Craig Ruby (University of Missouri) (5th year)

Assistant coach(es)

- Jack Lipe (University of Illinois) (3rd year)

Legend

- (C) Team captain
- (S) Suspended
- (I) Ineligible
- (W) Walk-on
- Injured
- Current redshirt

Roster

== Schedule ==
Date time, TV	Rank^{#}	Opponent^{#}	Result	Record	Site (attendance) city, state
Non-Conference regular season
12/11/1926*		Bradley	W 37–24	1-0	New Gymnasium (6,336); Champaign, IL
12/17/1926*		Coe College	L 22–28	1-1	New Gymnasium (5,994); Champaign, IL
12/20/1926*		Drake	W 34–26	2-1	New Gymnasium (5,635); Champaign, IL
12/30/1926*		North Dakota	W 36–28	3-1	New Gymnasium (1,336); Champaign, IL
Big Ten regular season
1/3/1927		at Minnesota	W 27–13	4-1 (1-0)	Kenwood Armory; Minneapolis, MN
1/8/1927		at Northwestern; Rivalry	W 27–23	5-1 (2-0)	Patten Gymnasium; Evanston, IL
1/15/1927		at Ohio State	L 28–29	5-2 (2-1)	Ohio Expo Center Coliseum; Columbus, OH
1/17/1927		at Michigan	L 24–25	5-3 (2-2)	Yost Field House; Ann Arbor, MI
1/22/1927		Iowa; Rivalry	W 40–33	6-3 (3-2)	New Gymnasium (6,578); Champaign, IL
2/2/1927*		Butler	L 30–32	6-4	New Gymnasium (4,823); Champaign, IL
2/5/1927		Minnesota	W 36–27	7-4 (4-2)	New Gymnasium (4,947); Champaign, IL
2/7/1927		Ohio State	W 43–30	8-4 (5-2)	New Gymnasium (6,569); Champaign, IL
2/12/1926		at Iowa; Rivalry	L 24–26	8-5 (5-3)	Iowa Armory; Iowa City, IA
2/16/1927		Northwestern; Rivalry	W 46–32	9-5 (6-3)	New Gymnasium (5,978); Champaign, IL
2/25/1927		Michigan	L 26–30	9-6 (6-4)	New Gymnasium (6,697); Champaign, IL
2/28/1927		Wisconsin	W 32–28	10-6 (7-4)	New Gymnasium (6,697); Champaign, IL
3/5/1927		at Wisconsin	L 13–39	10-7 (7-5)	Red Gymnasium; Madison, WI
*Non-conference game. ^{#}Rankings from AP Poll. (#) Tournament seedings in parentheses. All times are in Central Time.
