= Cat Thompson =

American basketball player (1906–1990)

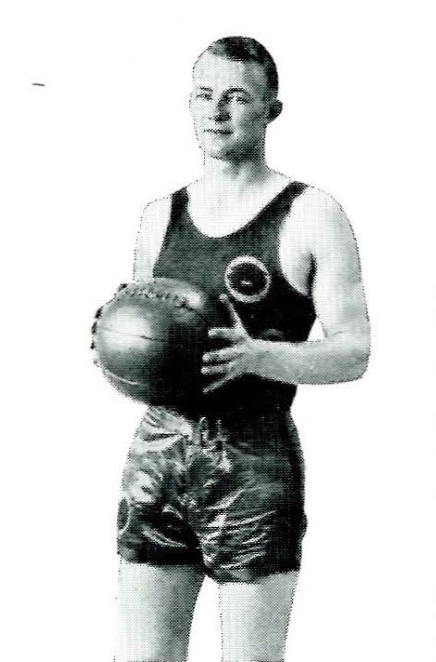
- Thompson from the 1930 Montanan

Personal information
- Born: February 10, 1906 St. George, Utah, U.S.
- Died: October 7, 1990 (aged 84) Idaho Falls, Idaho, U.S.
- Listed height: 5 ft 10 in (1.78 m)

Career information
- High school: Dixie (St. George, Utah)
- College: Montana State (1926–1930)
- Position: Forward

Career highlights
- Helms National Player of the Year (1929); Helms National Champion (1929); 4× All-American (1927–1930)
- Basketball Hall of Fame
- Collegiate Basketball Hall of Fame

John Ashworth "Cat" Thompson (February 10, 1906 – October 7, 1990) was an American basketball player and coach.

== Early life, family and education ==
Thompson was born in St. George, Utah. He attended Dixie High School in St. George. The school's basketball team won the Utah state championship and finished second in the High School National Tournament in 1925.

== College athlete ==
He attended Montana State University and played on its men's basketball and baseball teams. During that time his team had a record of 123–21. In 1929, he won the Helms Foundation Player of the Year award and his team won Helms National Championship . He averaged 15.4 points per game when the average team scored 40 points per game. He "was a two-time all-Rocky Mountain Conference pick in basketball and a standout baseball player."

He was named All-America in 1927, 1928, 1929 and 1930. He scored 1,539 points in 100 career college games he played.

== Career ==
Thompson played one year of semi-professional basketball, but then retired from being an athlete and became a coach (basketball and baseball), arriving at Idaho Falls, Idaho in the early 1940s. His Idaho Falls high school team won the state championship in 1945.

He developed an enduring basketball scorebook.

== Additional honors and awards ==
Thompson was enshrined in the Naismith Memorial Basketball Hall of Fame in 1962.

The 2009 ESPN College Basketball Encyclopedia names Thompson "one of the five greatest college hoops players of the first half of the 20th century".

== Personal life and demise ==
Thompson died in Idaho Falls, Idaho at age 84.
