= 1926–27 Duke Blue Devils men's basketball team =

American college basketball season

1926–27 Duke Blue Devils men's basketball

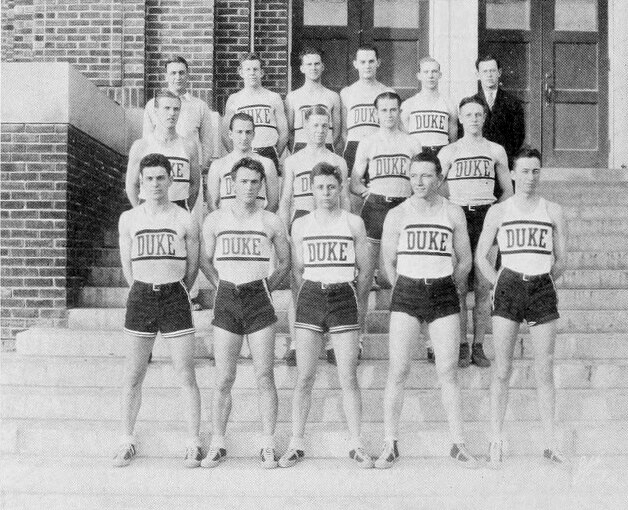
- Conference: Independent
- Record: 4–10
- Head coach: George Buchheit (3rd season)
- Captain: Marshall Butler
- Home arena: Alumni Memorial Gymnasium

The 1926–27 Duke Blue Devils men's basketball team represented Duke University during the 1926–27 men's college basketball season. The head coach was George Buchheit, coaching his third season with the Blue Devils. The team finished with an overall record of 4–10.

== Schedule ==
Date time, TV	Opponent	Result	Record	Site city, state
*	N.C. State	L 22–36	0–1	
*	Wake Forest	L 14–41	0–2	
*	Davidson	W 39–24	1–2	
*	Virginia Tech	W 31–18	2–2	
*	Virginia	L 24–34	2–3	Alumni Memorial Gym; Durham, NC
*	at Virginia	W 36–26	3–3	
*	Washington and Lee	L 20–31	3–4	
*	VMI	W 22–19	4–4	
*	N.C. State	L 23–29	4–5	
*	Wake Forest	L 27–36	4–6	
*	Davidson	L 42–49	4–7	
*	Durham YMCA	L 27–34	4–8	
1/31/1927*	North Carolina	L 33–40	4–9	Alumni Memorial Gym; Durham, NC
2/22/1927*	at North Carolina	L 21–35	4–10	Chapel Hill, NC
*Non-conference game. (#) Tournament seedings in parentheses.
