= 1926–27 Buffalo Bisons men's basketball team =

American college basketball season

1926–27 Buffalo Bisons men's basketball
- Conference: Independent
- Record: 11–4
- Head coach: Art Powell (12th season)

The 1926–27 Buffalo Bisons men's basketball team represented the University of Buffalo during the 1926–27 NCAA college men's basketball season. The head coach was Art Powell, coaching his twelfth season with the Bisons.

== Schedule ==
Date time, TV	Opponent	Result	Record	Site city, state
	Buffalo Normal	W 35–09	1–0	Buffalo, NY
	Toronto	W 36–23	2–0	Buffalo, NY
	Cornell	W 23–20	3–0	Buffalo, NY
	Hobart	W 43–24	4–0	Buffalo, NY
	at Rochester	L 26–29	4–1	Rochester, NY
	Colgate	L 21–32	4–2	Hamilton, NY
	Niagara	W 31–21	5–2	Buffalo, NY
	Alfred	W 41–23	6–2	Buffalo, NY
	Clarkson	W 44–14	7–2	Buffalo, NY
	Hamilton	W 42–24	8–2	Buffalo, NY
	at Niagara	W 30–17	9–2	Lewisburg, NY
	at Hobart	W 46–33	10–2	Geneva, NY
	Rochester	W 27–25	11–2	Buffalo, NY
	Penn State	L 41–43	11–3	Buffalo, NY
	Colgate	L 21–27	11–4	Buffalo, NY
*Non-conference game. (#) Tournament seedings in parentheses.
