= 1926–27 Vanderbilt Commodores men's basketball team =

American college basketball season

1926–27 Vanderbilt Commodores men's basketball
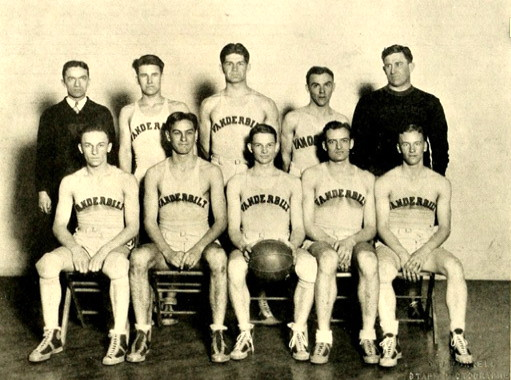

SoCon Tournament champion
- Conference: Southern Conference
- Record: 20–4 (7–1 SoCon)
- Head coach: Josh Cody
- Captain: Malcolm Moss
- Home arena: Old Gym

1926–27 Southern Conference men's basketball standings
| | Conf. | | | | Overall |
| Team | W | | L | PCT | W | | L | PCT |
|---|---|---|---|---|---|---|---|---|
| South Carolina | 9 | – | 1 | .900 | 14 | – | 4 | .778 |
| Vanderbilt† | 7 | – | 1 | .875 | 20 | – | 4 | .833 |
| Georgia Tech | 8 | – | 2 | .800 | 17 | – | 10 | .630 |
| Auburn | 12 | – | 4 | .750 | 13 | – | 6 | .684 |
| Washington and Lee | 6 | – | 2 | .750 | 10 | – | 6 | .625 |
| Mississippi | 10 | – | 4 | .714 | 13 | – | 5 | .722 |
| NC State | 5 | – | 2 | .714 | 12 | – | 5 | .706 |
| North Carolina | 7 | – | 3 | .700 | 17 | – | 7 | .708 |
| Maryland | 6 | – | 4 | .600 | 10 | – | 10 | .500 |
| Mississippi A&M | 7 | – | 5 | .583 | 17 | – | 7 | .708 |
| Tennessee | 5 | – | 4 | .556 | 7 | – | 12 | .368 |
| Alabama | 4 | – | 5 | .444 | 5 | – | 8 | .385 |
| Virginia | 5 | – | 7 | .417 | 9 | – | 10 | .474 |
| Tulane | 7 | – | 10 | .412 | 7 | – | 10 | .412 |
| LSU | 3 | – | 5 | .375 | 7 | – | 9 | .438 |
| Georgia | 3 | – | 6 | .333 | 14 | – | 8 | .636 |
| Virginia Tech | 2 | – | 6 | .250 | 6 | – | 8 | .429 |
| Kentucky | 1 | – | 6 | .143 | 3 | – | 13 | .188 |
| Clemson | 1 | – | 7 | .125 | 2 | – | 13 | .133 |
| Florida | 1 | – | 8 | .111 | 6 | – | 20 | .231 |
| VMI | 0 | – | 7 | .000 | 4 | – | 11 | .267 |
| Sewanee | 0 | – | 10 | .000 | 3 | – | 11 | .214 |
† Southern Conference Tournament winner

The 1926–27 Vanderbilt Commodores men's basketball team represented Vanderbilt University in the 1926–27 college basketball season. The team went 20–4—the best record in school history—and won the Southern Conference tournament championship. The team was coached by Josh Cody, and led by center Jim Stuart and guard John McCall. Cody had a variety of superstitions while coaching his basketball team, including not laundering jerseys during a winning streak until a game was lost, and starting contests with the same lineup.
