= 1926–27 North Carolina Tar Heels men's basketball team =

American college basketball season

1926–27 North Carolina Tar Heels men's basketball
- Conference: Southern Conference
- Record: 17–7 ( SoCon)
- Head coach: James N. Ashmore
- Captain: Bunn Hackney

1926–27 Southern Conference men's basketball standings
	Conf.				Overall
Team	W		L	PCT	W		L	PCT
South Carolina	9	–	1	.900	14	–	4	.778
Vanderbilt†	7	–	1	.875	20	–	4	.833
Georgia Tech	8	–	2	.800	17	–	10	.630
Auburn	12	–	4	.750	13	–	6	.684
Washington and Lee	6	–	2	.750	10	–	6	.625
Mississippi	10	–	4	.714	13	–	5	.722
NC State	5	–	2	.714	12	–	5	.706
North Carolina	7	–	3	.700	17	–	7	.708
Maryland	6	–	4	.600	10	–	10	.500
Mississippi A&M	7	–	5	.583	17	–	7	.708
Tennessee	5	–	4	.556	7	–	12	.368
Alabama	4	–	5	.444	5	–	8	.385
Virginia	5	–	7	.417	9	–	10	.474
Tulane	7	–	10	.412	7	–	10	.412
LSU	3	–	5	.375	7	–	9	.438
Georgia	3	–	6	.333	14	–	8	.636
Virginia Tech	2	–	6	.250	6	–	8	.429
Kentucky	1	–	6	.143	3	–	13	.188
Clemson	1	–	7	.125	2	–	13	.133
Florida	1	–	8	.111	6	–	20	.231
VMI	0	–	7	.000	4	–	11	.267
Sewanee	0	–	10	.000	3	–	11	.214
† Southern Conference Tournament winner

The 1926–27 North Carolina Tar Heels men's basketball team represented the University of North Carolina during the 1926–27 NCAA men's basketball season in the United States. The team finished the season with a 17–7 record.

This season was James N. Ashmore's first year as the head coach for this university. During this time, the team was nicknamed the "White Phantoms," a name that originated in Atlanta by a sportswriter. This team started off their season by playing 5 games against YMCA teams as a way to prepare themselves for the league games. Bunn Hackney was a captain of this team and was named to the All-Southern Conference tournament first-team in 1926 and All-Southern Conference second-team in 1927.
