= 1926–27 Wisconsin Badgers men's basketball team =

American college basketball season

1926–27 Wisconsin Badgers men's basketball
- Conference: Big Ten Conference
- Record: 10–7 (7–5 Big Ten)
- Head coach: Walter Meanwell
- Home arena: Red Gym

1926–27 Big Ten Conference men's basketball standings
	Conf.				Overall
Team	W		L	PCT	W		L	PCT
Michigan	10	–	2	.833	14	–	3	.824
Indiana	9	–	3	.750	13	–	4	.765
Purdue	9	–	3	.750	12	–	5	.706
Illinois	7	–	5	.583	10	–	7	.588
Wisconsin	7	–	5	.583	10	–	7	.588
Iowa	7	–	5	.583	9	–	8	.529
Ohio State	6	–	6	.500	11	–	6	.647
Chicago	3	–	9	.250	6	–	11	.353
Minnesota	1	–	11	.083	3	–	13	.188
Northwestern	1	–	11	.083	3	–	14	.176

The 1926–27 Wisconsin Badgers men's basketball team represented University of Wisconsin–Madison. The head coach was Walter Meanwell, coaching his thirteenth season with the Badgers. The team played their home games at the Red Gym in Madison, Wisconsin and was a member of the Big Ten Conference.

== Schedule ==
Date time, TV	Rank^{#}	Opponent^{#}	Result	Record	Site city, state
Regular Season
12/17/1926*		Franklin (IN)	L 24–27	0–1	Red Gym; Madison, Wisconsin
12/22/1926*		at Marquette	W 29–26	1–1	Marquette Gymnasium; Milwaukee
12/30/1926*		DePauw (IN)	W 24–20	2–1	Red Gym; Madison, Wisconsin
1/03/1927*		vs. Syracuse	W 31–24	3–1	Cleveland
1/08/1927		Indiana	L 23–28	3–2 (0–1)	Red Gym; Madison, Wisconsin
1/10/1927		Ohio State	W 25–16	4–2 (1–1)	Red Gym; Madison, Wisconsin
1/15/1927		at Northwestern	W 28–18	5–2 (2–1)	Patten Gymnasium; Evanston, Illinois
1/17/1927		at Chicago	W 33–30 ^{OT}	6–2 (3–1)	Bartlett Gymnasium; Chicago
1/22/1927		Northwestern	W 25–24	7–2 (4–1)	Red Gym; Madison, Wisconsin
2/08/1927*		Notre Dame	L 14–19	7–3	Red Gym; Madison, Wisconsin
2/12/1927		Chicago	W 31–20	8–3 (5–1)	Red Gym; Madison, Wisconsin
2/19/1927		at Ohio State	L 16–20	8–4 (5–2)	Ohio Expo Center Coliseum; Columbus, Ohio
2/22/1927		Iowa	W 24–21	9–4 (6–2)	Red Gym; Madison, Wisconsin
2/26/1927		at Indiana	L 23–31	9–5 (6–3)	Men's Gymnasium; Bloomington, Indiana
2/28/1927		at Illinois	L 28–32	9–6 (6–4)	Huff Hall; Champaign, Illinois
3/05/1927		Illinois	W 39–13	10–6 (7–4)	Red Gym; Madison, Wisconsin
3/11/1927		at Iowa	L 17–26	10–7 (7–5)	Iowa Field House; Iowa City, IA
*Non-conference game. ^{#}Rankings from AP Poll. (#) Tournament seedings in parentheses.
