= 1926–27 California Golden Bears men's basketball team =

American college basketball season

1926–27 California Golden Bears men's basketball
- Conference: Pacific Coast Conference
- Record: 17–0 (5–0 PCC)
- Head coach: Nibs Price (3rd season)

The 1926–27 California Golden Bears men's basketball team represented the University of California, Berkeley in intercollegiate basketball during the 1926–27 season. The team finished the season with a 17–0 record and was retroactively listed as the top team of the season by the Premo-Porretta Power Poll. It was head coach Nibs Price's third season coaching the team.
