= 1930–31 NCAA men's basketball season =

Men's collegiate basketball season

- Helms National Champions: Northwestern (retroactive selection in 1943)
- Player of the Year (Helms): Bart Carlton, Ada Teachers College (retroactive selection in 1944)

The 1930–31 NCAA men's basketball season began in December 1930, progressed through the regular season and conference tournaments, and concluded in March 1931.

== Rule changes ==
If the player with the ball is guarded closely and withholds the ball from play for five seconds, a "held ball" can be called.

== Season headlines ==
- On February 20, 1931, St. John's and Carnegie Tech met in the first college basketball game ever filmed for a newsreel.
- In February 1943, the Helms Athletic Foundation retroactively selected Northwestern as its national champion for the 1930–31 season.
- In 1995, the Premo-Porretta Power Poll retroactively selected Northwestern as its top-ranked team for the 1930–31 season.

== Regular season ==
=== Conferences ===
==== Conference winners and tournaments ====
Conference	Regular season winner	Conference player of the year	Conference tournament	Tournament venue (City)	Tournament winner
Big Six Conference	Kansas	None selected	No Tournament		
Big Ten Conference	Northwestern	None selected	No Tournament		
Eastern Intercollegiate Basketball League	Columbia	None selected	No Tournament		
Missouri Valley Conference	Creighton & Oklahoma A&M	None selected	No Tournament		
Pacific Coast Conference	Washington (North); USC (South)		No Tournament; Washington defeated USC in best-of-three conference championship playoff series		
Rocky Mountain Athletic Conference	Wyoming (Eastern); Utah (Western)		No Tournament		
Southern Conference	Georgia	None selected	1931 Southern Conference men's basketball tournament	Municipal Auditorium (Atlanta, Georgia)	Maryland
Southwest Conference	TCU	None selected	No Tournament		

==== Conference standings ====
1930–31 Big Six Conference men's basketball standings
	Conf.				Overall
Team	W		L	PCT	W		L	PCT
Kansas	7	–	3	.700	15	–	3	.833
Nebraska	6	–	4	.600	9	–	9	.500
Kansas State	5	–	5	.500	11	–	6	.647
Missouri	5	–	5	.500	8	–	9	.471
Iowa State	4	–	6	.400	8	–	8	.500
Oklahoma	3	–	7	.300	10	–	8	.556

1930–31 Big Ten Conference men's basketball standings
	Conf.				Overall
Team	W		L	PCT	W		L	PCT
Northwestern	11	–	1	.917	16	–	1	.941
Michigan	8	–	4	.667	13	–	4	.765
Minnesota	8	–	4	.667	13	–	4	.765
Purdue	8	–	4	.667	12	–	5	.706
Illinois	7	–	5	.583	12	–	5	.706
Indiana	5	–	7	.417	9	–	8	.529
Chicago	4	–	8	.333	8	–	9	.471
Wisconsin	4	–	8	.333	8	–	9	.471
Ohio State	3	–	9	.250	4	–	13	.235
Iowa	2	–	10	.167	5	–	12	.294

1930–31 Eastern Intercollegiate Basketball League standings
	Conf.				Overall
Team	W		L	PCT	W		L	PCT
Columbia	10	–	0	1.000	20	–	2	.909
Dartmouth	6	–	4	.600	14	–	7	.667
Yale	6	–	4	.600	15	–	8	.652
Cornell	4	–	6	.400	10	–	9	.526
Penn	3	–	7	.300	9	–	17	.346
Princeton	1	–	9	.100	9	–	13	.409

1930–31 Missouri Valley Conference men's basketball standings
	Conf.				Overall
Team	W		L	PCT	W		L	PCT
Creighton	5	–	3	.625	8	–	10	.444
Oklahoma A&M	5	–	3	.625	7	–	9	.438
Washington University	5	–	3	.625	6	–	12	.333
Grinnell	3	–	5	.375	7	–	8	.467
Drake	2	–	6	.250	4	–	15	.211

1930–31 Pacific Coast Conference men's basketball standings
	Conf.				Overall
Team	W		L	PCT	W		L	PCT
North
Washington †	14	–	2	.875	25	–	3	.893
Washington State	10	–	6	.625	18	–	7	.720
Oregon State	9	–	7	.563	19	–	9	.679
Oregon	6	–	10	.375	12	–	10	.545
Idaho	1	–	15	.063	3	–	16	.158
South
California	6	–	3	.667	12	–	10	.545
USC	5	–	4	.556	8	–	8	.500
UCLA	4	–	5	.444	9	–	6	.600
Stanford	3	–	0	1.000	8	–	9	.471
† Conference playoff series winner

1930–31 Rocky Mountain Conference men's basketball standings
	Conf.				Overall
Team	W		L	PCT	W		L	PCT
Eastern
Wyoming	11	–	1	.917	19	–	4	.826
Northern Colorado	10	–	4	.714	11	–	5	.688
Colorado	8	–	4	.667	8	–	7	.533
Western State	5	–	4	.556	8	–	5	.615
Denver	7	–	7	.500	10	–	8	.556
Colorado College	5	–	9	.357	14	–	15	.483
Colorado Agricultural	4	–	8	.333	4	–	8	.333
Colorado Mines	0	–	12	.000	0	–	12	.000
Western
Utah	8	–	4	.667	21	–	6	.778
Utah State	7	–	5	.583	13	–	7	.650
BYU	7	–	5	.583	20	–	13	.606
Montana State	2	–	10	.167	9	–	13	.409

1930–31 Southern Conference men's basketball standings
	Conf.				Overall
Team	W		L	PCT	W		L	PCT
Georgia	15	–	1	.938	23	–	2	.920
Maryland †	8	–	1	.889	18	–	4	.818
Alabama	11	–	2	.846	14	–	6	.700
Kentucky	8	–	2	.800	15	–	3	.833
Auburn	7	–	4	.636	8	–	6	.571
Washington and Lee	4	–	3	.571	11	–	7	.611
Duke	5	–	4	.556	14	–	7	.667
Georgia Tech	8	–	7	.533	11	–	13	.458
Vanderbilt	7	–	7	.500	16	–	8	.667
North Carolina	6	–	6	.500	15	–	9	.625
NC State	5	–	5	.500	8	–	8	.500
LSU	4	–	4	.500	7	–	8	.467
Virginia	5	–	6	.455	11	–	9	.550
Florida	5	–	7	.417	10	–	9	.526
Clemson	3	–	5	.375	6	–	7	.462
Sewanee	3	–	5	.375	5	–	9	.357
Tennessee	4	–	8	.333	11	–	10	.524
Ole Miss	2	–	4	.333	6	–	9	.400
Virginia Tech	3	–	7	.300	5	–	10	.333
VMI	2	–	8	.200	4	–	12	.250
Tulane	2	–	10	.167	6	–	14	.300
South Carolina	1	–	12	.077	1	–	17	.056
† Southern Conference Tournament winner

1930–31 Southwest Conference men's basketball standings
	Conf.				Overall
Team	W		L	PCT	W		L	PCT
TCU	9	–	3	.750	18	–	4	.818
SMU	8	–	4	.667	9	–	8	.529
Arkansas	7	–	5	.583	14	–	9	.609
Baylor	7	–	5	.583	12	–	8	.600
Texas A&M	5	–	7	.417	14	–	8	.636
Rice	4	–	8	.333	8	–	9	.471
Texas	2	–	10	.167	9	–	15	.375

=== Major independents ===
A total of 95 college teams played as major independents. Buffalo (15–0), Central Normal (19–0), and Pittsburg State (21–0) were undefeated and Northwest Missouri State (32–6) finished with the most wins.

1930–31 NCAA men's basketball independents standings
	Conf.				Overall
Team	W		L	PCT	W		L	PCT
Buffalo		–		–	15	–	0	1.000
Central Normal		–		–	19	–	0	1.000
Pittsburg State		–		–	21	–	0	1.000
St. John's (N.Y.)		–		–	21	–	1	.955
Michigan State		–		–	16	–	1	.941
Loyola (Md.)		–		–	14	–	1	.933
Westminster (Pa.)		–		–	13	–	1	.929
Wittenberg		–		–	18	–	2	.900
Butler		–		–	17	–	2	.895
Manhattan		–		–	17	–	2	.895
Rider		–		–	17	–	2	.895
Valparaiso		–		–	16	–	2	.889
Wooster		–		–	16	–	2	.889
Furman		–		–	15	–	2	.882
Mount Union		–		–	19	–	3	.864
West Texas State		–		–	18	–	3	.857
East Central		–		–	22	–	4	.846
Northwest Missouri State		–		–	32	–	6	.842
Santa Clara		–		–	16	–	3	.842
LIU		–		–	15	–	3	.833
Pittsburgh		–		–	20	–	4	.833
Navy		–		–	14	–	3	.824
Western State Teachers		–		–	14	–	3	.824
DePaul		–		–	13	–	3	.813
Temple		–		–	17	–	4	.810
Army		–		–	12	–	3	.800
Carleton		–		–	12	–	3	.800
Syracuse		–		–	16	–	4	.800
Western Kentucky State		–		–	11	–	3	.786
Wichita Municipal		–		–	18	–	5	.783
St. Bonaventure		–		–	10	–	3	.769
Xavier		–		–	10	–	3	.769
Rhode Island State		–		–	13	–	4	.765
William & Mary		–		–	13	–	6	.684
St. Joseph's		–		–	16	–	5	.762
CCNY		–		–	12	–	4	.750
Ohio		–		–	12	–	4	.750
Fordham		–		–	14	–	5	.737
Providence		–		–	14	–	5	.737
Tulsa		–		–	10	–	4	.714
George Washington		–		–	11	–	5	.688
Saint Louis		–		–	13	–	6	.684
Arizona State		–		–	12	–	6	.667
Bowling Green State		–		–	10	–	5	.667
Canisius		–		–	10	–	5	.667
DePauw		–		–	12	–	6	.667
Duquesne		–		–	12	–	6	.667
Harvard		–		–	10	–	5	.667
San Francisco		–		–	12	–	6	.667
Springfield (Mass.)		–		–	11	–	6	.647
Connecticut		–		–	10	–	6	.625
Holy Cross		–		–	10	–	6	.625
Colgate		–		–	11	–	7	.611
Marquette		–		–	11	–	7	.611
Arizona		–		–	9	–	6	.600
New York University		–		–	9	–	6	.600
Notre Dame		–		–	12	–	8	.600
New Mexico		–		–	9	–	7	.563
Texas Tech		–		–	11	–	9	.550
Niagara		–		–	12	–	10	.545
Loyola (Ill.)		–		–	8	–	7	.533
Northern Arizona State		–		–	8	–	7	.533
Marshall		–		–	9	–	8	.529
Bradley		–		–	10	–	9	.526
Detroit		–		–	10	–	9	.526
Seton Hall		–		–	12	–	11	.522
Saint Francis (N.Y.)		–		–	17	–	16	.515
Davidson		–		–	8	–	8	.500
Brown		–		–	9	–	10	.474
Kent State		–		–	8	–	9	.471
Indiana State		–		–	7	–	8	.467
Boston University		–		–	6	–	7	.462
Montana		–		–	10	–	12	.455
West Virginia		–		–	9	–	11	.450
Wake Forest		–		–	8	–	10	.444
Texas State M&M		–		–	7	–	9	.438
Richmond		–		–	6	–	8	.429
Lafayette		–		–	8	–	12	.400
The Citadel		–		–	6	–	9	.400
Muhlenberg		–		–	6	–	9	.400
Rutgers		–		–	6	–	9	.400
New Mexico A&M		–		–	9	–	14	.391
Bucknell		–		–	6	–	11	.353
Villanova		–		–	7	–	13	.350
Miami (Ohio)		–		–	5	–	10	.333
Louisville		–		–	5	–	11	.313
Toledo		–		–	5	–	12	.294
Washburn		–		–	4	–	11	.267
Georgetown		–		–	5	–	16	.238
Saint Mary's (Calif.)		–		–	4	–	13	.235
Lehigh		–		–	4	–	14	.222
Penn State		–		–	3	–	12	.200
Cincinnati		–		–	2	–	15	.118
Dayton		–		–	2	–	15	.118

== Awards ==
=== Consensus All-American team ===
Consensus Team
Player	Class	Team
Wes Fesler	Senior	Ohio State
George Gregory	Senior	Columbia
Joe Reiff	Sophomore	Northwestern
Elwood Romney	Sophomore	Brigham Young
John Wooden	Junior	Purdue

=== Major player of the year awards ===
- Helms Player of the Year: Bart Carlton, Ada Teachers College (retroactive selection in 1944)

== Coaching changes ==
A number of teams changed coaches during the season and after it ended.

Team	Former Coach	Interim Coach	New Coach	Reason
Brown	Rufus Bond		Art Kahler	Bond left to become freshman coach at Harvard.
Canisius	Luke Urban		Russell Burt	
Clemson	Josh Cody		Joe Davis	Cody left to coach at Vanderbilt.
Connecticut	Louis Alexander		John Heldman Jr.	
Davidson	William L. Younger		Red Laird	
Georgetown	John Colrick		Fred Mesmer	
Georgia	Herman Stegeman		Rex Enright	
Indiana State	Wally Marks		J. Roy Goodland	
Marshall	Johnny Stuart		Tom Dandelet	
Michigan	George Veenker		Frank Cappon	
New Mexico	Roy W. Johnson		Tom Churchill	
Niagara	William McCarthy		John J. Gallagher	
North Carolina	James N. Ashmore		Bo Shepard	
Northern Colorado	George E. Cooper		John S. Davis	
Oklahoma A&M	George E. Rody		Harold James	Rody left to coach at Tulane.
Rider	Clair Bee		Paul Frank	
San Francisco	Jimmy Needles		Phil Morrissey	
Seton Hall	Dan Steinberg		Les Fries	
Texas	Mysterious Walker		Ed Olle	
Texas Tech	W. L. Golightly		Dell Morgan	
Tulane	Claude Simons Sr.		George E. Rody	
Vanderbilt	Garland Morrow		Josh Cody	
Virginia Tech	C. D. Rhodes		George S. Proctor	
Wake Forest	R. S. Hayes		Fred Emmerson	
