= 1930–31 Northwestern Wildcats men's basketball team =

American college basketball season

1930–31 Northwestern Wildcats men's basketball

Big Ten Conference Champions Helms Foundation National Champions
- Conference: Big Ten Conference
- Record: 16–1 (11–1 Big Ten)
- Head coach: Dutch Lonborg (4th season)
- Captain: Bert Riel
- Home arena: Old Patten Gymnasium

1930–31 Big Ten Conference men's basketball standings
| | Conf. | | | | Overall |
| Team | W | | L | PCT | W | | L | PCT |
|---|---|---|---|---|---|---|---|---|
| Northwestern | 11 | – | 1 | .917 | 16 | – | 1 | .941 |
| Michigan | 8 | – | 4 | .667 | 13 | – | 4 | .765 |
| Minnesota | 8 | – | 4 | .667 | 13 | – | 4 | .765 |
| Purdue | 8 | – | 4 | .667 | 12 | – | 5 | .706 |
| Illinois | 7 | – | 5 | .583 | 12 | – | 5 | .706 |
| Indiana | 5 | – | 7 | .417 | 9 | – | 8 | .529 |
| Chicago | 4 | – | 8 | .333 | 8 | – | 9 | .471 |
| Wisconsin | 4 | – | 8 | .333 | 8 | – | 9 | .471 |
| Ohio State | 3 | – | 9 | .250 | 4 | – | 13 | .235 |
| Iowa | 2 | – | 10 | .167 | 5 | – | 12 | .294 |

The 1930–31 Northwestern Wildcats men's basketball team represented Northwestern University during the 1930–31 NCAA men's basketball season in the United States. The head coach was Dutch Lonborg, coaching in his fourth season with the Wildcats. The team finished the season with a 16–1 record and was the champion of the Big Ten. The team was retroactively named the national champion by the Helms Athletic Foundation and was retroactively listed as the top team of the season by the Premo-Porretta Power Poll.

== Schedule and results ==
| Date time, TV | Rank^{#} | Opponent^{#} | Result | Record | Site city, state |
Regular season
| 12/8/1930* | | Bradley | W 36–23 | 1–0 | Old Patten Gymnasium; Evanston, Illinois |
| 12/12/1930* | | at Notre Dame | W 44–29 | 2–0 | Notre Dame Fieldhouse; South Bend, Indiana |
| 12/20/1930* | | Carleton | W 31–22 | 3–0 | Old Patten Gymnasium; Evanston, Illinois |
| 12/31/1930* | | Alabama | W 32–10 | 4–0 | Old Patten Gymnasium; Evanston, Illinois |
| 1/3/1931* | | Notre Dame | W 20–17 | 5–0 | Old Patten Gymnasium; Evanston, Illinois |
| 1/10/1931 | | Michigan | W 27–22 | 6–0 (1–0) | Old Patten Gymnasium; Evanston, Illinois |
| 1/12/1931 | | at Illinois | W 29–27 | 7–0 (2–0) | Huff Hall; Champaign, Illinois |
| 1/19/1931 | | at Michigan | W 26–21 | 8–0 (3–0) | Yost Field House; Ann Arbor, Michigan |
| 1/24/1931 | | Ohio State | W 35–22 | 9–0 (4–0) | Old Patten Gymnasium; Evanston, Illinois |
| 2/7/1931 | | Chicago | W 31–16 | 10–0 (5–0) | Old Patten Gymnasium; Evanston, Illinois |
| 2/9/1931 | | Minnesota | W 35–26 | 11–0 (6–0) | Old Patten Gymnasium; Evanston, Illinois |
| 2/14/1931 | | at Chicago | W 27–15 | 12–0 (7–0) | Bartlett Gymnasium; Chicago |
| 2/16/1931 | | Illinois | L 28–35 | 12–1 (7–1) | Old Patten Gymnasium; Evanston, Illinois |
| 2/21/1931 | | at Iowa | W 40–30 | 13–1 (8–1) | Iowa Field House; Iowa City, IA |
| 2/23/1931 | | at Minnesota | W 45–23 | 14–1 (9–1) | Williams Arena; Minneapolis |
| 2/28/1931 | | at Ohio State | W 32–18 | 15–1 (10–1) | Ohio Expo Center Coliseum; Columbus, Ohio |
| 3/2/1931 | | Iowa | W 41–16 | 16–1 (11–1) | Old Patten Gymnasium; Evanston, Illinois |
*Non-conference game. ^{#}Rankings from AP Poll. (#) Tournament seedings in parentheses.

== Individual honors ==
- Joe Reiff – Consensus All-American
