= East Central Tigers =

Collegiate sports club in the United States

- University: East Central University
- Conference: GAC
- NCAA: Division II
- Athletic director: Matt Cole
- Location: Ada, Oklahoma
- Varsity teams: 13 (6 men's, 7 women's)
- Football stadium: Koi Ishto Stadium
- Basketball arena: Kerr Activities Center
- Baseball stadium: Ken Turner Field
- Soccer stadium: Tiger Field
- Mascot: Roary the Tiger
- Nickname: Tigers
- Colors: Black and orange
- Website: ecutigers.com

The East Central Tigers (also ECU Tigers) are the athletic teams that represent East Central University, located in Ada, Oklahoma, in NCAA Division II intercollegiate sports. The Tigers compete as members of the Great American Conference for all 11 varsity sports.

== Sports sponsored ==
Men's sports	Women's sports
Baseball	Basketball
Basketball	Cross Country
Cross Country	Golf
Football	Soccer
Golf	Softball
Track and Field	Track and Field
	Volleyball

In March 2016, the school announced that it was suspending golf and tennis due to budget cuts by the state of Oklahoma.

== National championships ==
=== Team ===
Sport	Association	Division	Year	Opponent/Runner-up	Score
Football (1)	NAIA	Division I	1993	Glenville State	49–35

== Individual sports ==
=== Football ===
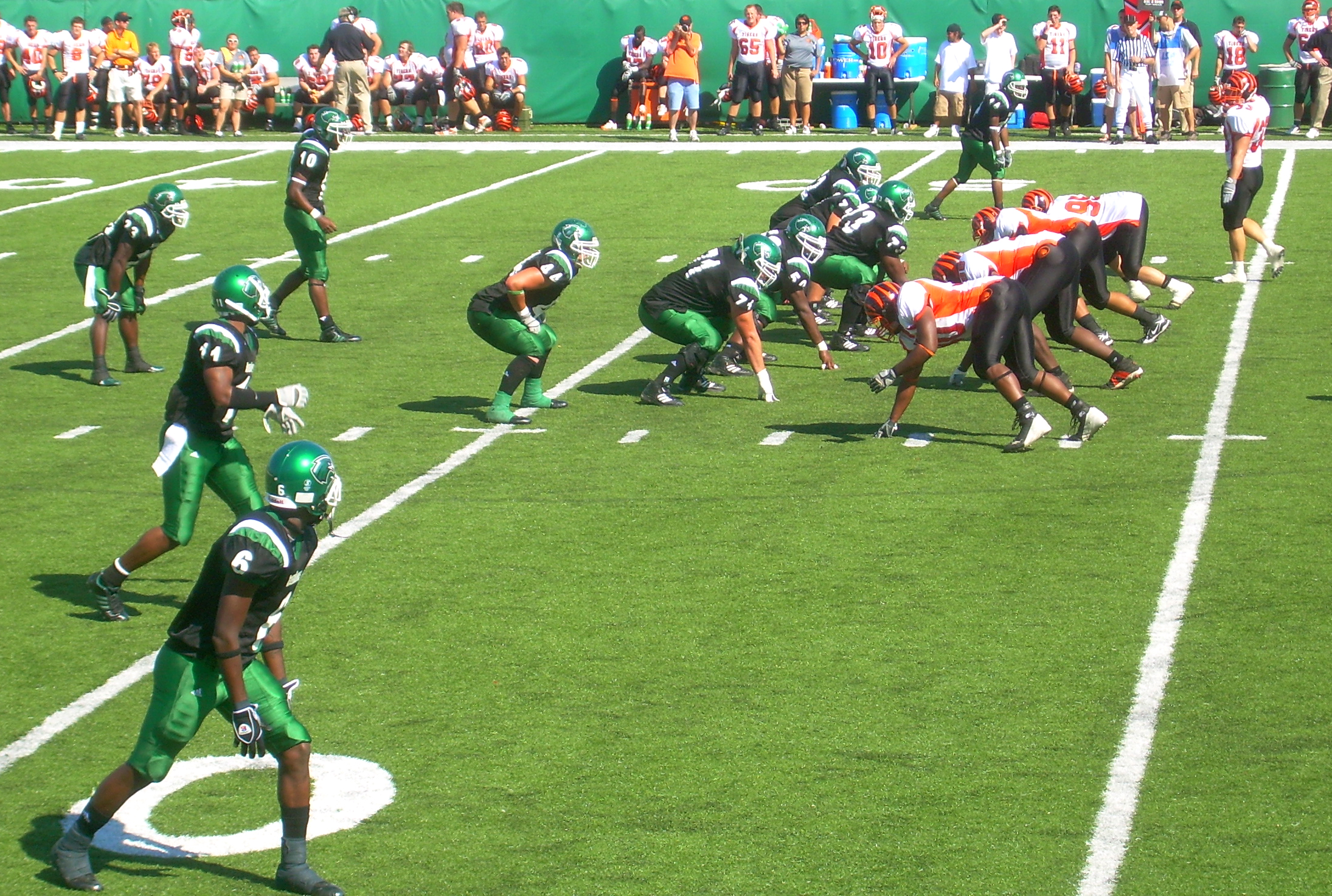
Division II game between East Central and Northeastern State.

In 1993, the Tigers won the NAIA national football championship against Glenville State 49-35 at ECU's Norris Field. In 2011 the Tigers won the inaugural GAC regular season championship and the Conference tournament championship.

=== Basketball ===
For three seasons — from 1928 through 1931, when the school was known as Ada Teachers College — the Tigers men's basketball team played at a major competitive level comparable to what since 1973 would be considered NCAA Division I. During these years, Tigers guard Bart Carlton was a two-time All-American in 1930 and 1931. In 1944, the Helms Athletic Foundation retroactively selected him as the Helms Foundation College Basketball Player of the Year for the 1930–31 NCAA men's basketball season.

On November 20, 2008, the Tigers men's basketball team and Texas Tech set school records for points scored in a game in a 167–115 Tigers loss to the Red Raiders.

=== Esports ===
East Central University relaunched a new sport program in 2024. In Fall 2024, the Tigers won the NECC Division VII national League of Legends championship.

== Alumni ==
- Harry "The Cat" Brecheen, former baseball player
- Bart Carlton, Helms Foundation College Basketball Player of the Year and DX-Oilers national championship Amateur Athletic Union basketball player
- Mark Gastineau, professional football player
- Todd Graham, former University of Hawaii head football coach
- Christopher Lane, baseball player
- Dewey McClain, football player and congressman
- Gil Morgan, professional golfer
- Red Phillips
- Brad Calip, college football hall-of-famer
- Cliff Thrift, former San Diego Chargers, Chicago Bears and Los Angeles Rams professional football player
- Lloyd Waner, baseball hall-of-famer
- Paul Waner, baseball hall-of-famer
- Armonty Bryant, professional football player
- Caleb Holley, professional football player
- David Moore, professional football player
