= Bradley Institute =

Bradley Institute may refer to:

- Bradley Institute for Music Education Research, music school founded by Harold Bradley in Niagara Falls, Ontario, Canada
- Bradley Institute Gymnasium, former name of the Hartmann Center for the Performing Arts in Peoria, Illinois, US
