= 1932 NCAA Men's Basketball All-Americans =

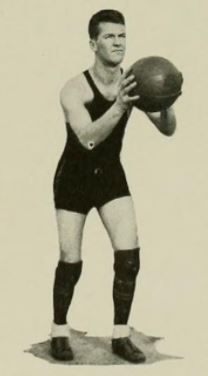
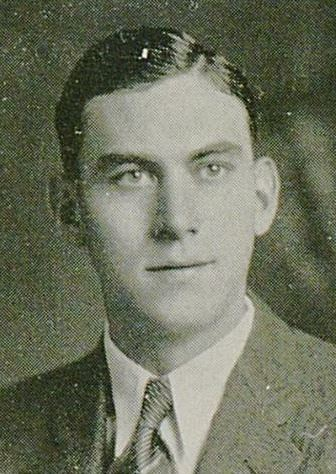
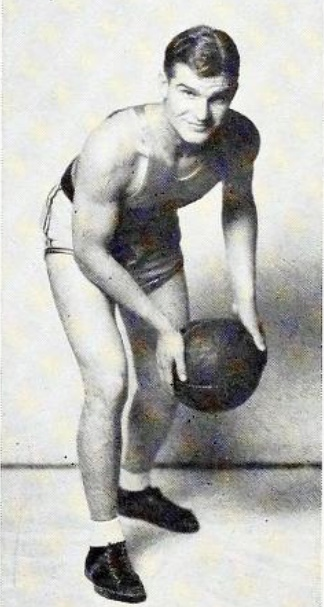
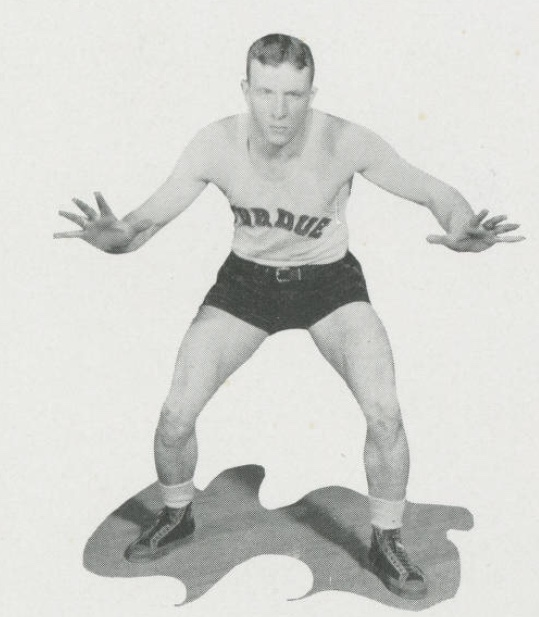
- Members of the 1932 Consensus All-America team. Clockwise from upper left: Berger, Sale, Wooden, Witte (not pictured: Krause).
- Awarded for: 1931–32 NCAA men's basketball season

The consensus 1932 College Basketball All-American team, as determined by aggregating the results of three major All-American teams. To earn "consensus" status, a player must win honors from a majority of the following teams: the Helms Athletic Foundation, Converse and College Humor Magazine.

== 1932 Consensus All-America team ==
Consensus Team
Player	Class	Team
Boze Berger	Senior	Maryland
Moose Krause	Sophomore	Notre Dame
Forest Sale	Junior	Kentucky
Les Witte	Sophomore	Wyoming
John Wooden	Senior	Purdue

== Individual All-America teams ==
All-America Team
All-America Team	First team		Second team		Third team	
All-America Team	Player	School	Player	School	Player	School
Helms	Boze Berger	Maryland	No second or third teams			
Helms	Alan Brachen	Providence	No second or third teams			
Helms	Ad Dietzel	Texas Christian	No second or third teams			
Helms	Dave Jones	Columbia	No second or third teams			
Helms	Joseph Kintana	Columbia	No second or third teams			
Helms	Moose Krause	Notre Dame	No second or third teams			
Helms	Elwood Romney	Brigham Young	No second or third teams			
Helms	Forest Sale	Kentucky	No second or third teams			
Helms	Les Witte	Wyoming	No second or third teams			
Helms	John Wooden	Purdue	No second or third teams			
College Humor	Lou Bender	Columbia	Dick Linthicum	UCLA	Virgil Licht	Minnesota
College Humor	Boze Berger	Maryland	Elliott Loughlin	Navy	Ted O'Leary	Kansas
College Humor	Moose Krause	Notre Dame	Moe Spahn	CCNY	Joe Reiff	Northwestern
College Humor	Forest Sale	Kentucky	Jack Stewart	Auburn	Ernie Schmidt	Kansas State Teachers
College Humor	John Wooden	Purdue	Marshall Tackett	Butler	James Sexton	Arkansas
Converse	Boze Berger	Maryland	No second or third teams			
Converse	Moose Krause	Notre Dame	No second or third teams			
Converse	Forest Sale	Kentucky	No second or third teams			
Converse	Les Witte	Wyoming	No second or third teams			
Converse	John Wooden	Purdue	No second or third teams			

== See also ==
- 1931–32 NCAA men's basketball season
