= Dick Linthicum =

American basketball player (1908/1909 – 1979)

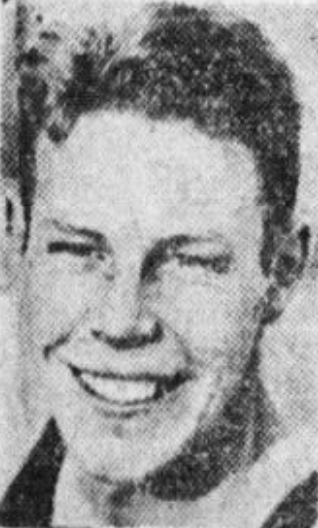
- Linthicum c. 1931

Personal information
- Born: 1908 or 1909
- Died: 1979 (aged 70)
- Listed height: 6 ft 1 1/2 in (1.87 m)
- Listed weight: 170 lb (77 kg)

Career information
- High school: Hollywood (Hollywood, California)
- College: UCLA (1928–1932)
- Position: Forward

Career highlights
- First-team All-American – Helms (1931); Second-team All-American – College Humor (1932); First-team All-PCC (1931); California Mr. Basketball (1927)

Richard Linthicum (1908 or 1909–1979) was an American college basketball player for the UCLA Bruins. He was the school's first All-American in any sport. Linthicum was then a UCLA assistant coach and scout for five seasons. He was inducted posthumously into the UCLA Athletics Hall of Fame in 1987.

Outside of basketball, Linthicum was a business manager with Columbia Pictures for eight years before serving 10 years in the U.S. Navy and 16 years in the Central Intelligence Agency (CIA).

== Basketball career ==
Linthicum attended Hollywood High School in Hollywood, California, where he earned all-city honors playing forward. His teammates included Carl Shy, who also later played at the University of California, Los Angeles.

Linthicum enrolled at UCLA in 1927, and became a key player on the Bruins' freshman squad as one of their best shooters. His first-year teammates included future Olympic gold medalist Frank Lubin. Standing 6 feet 1 1/2 inches (1.87 m) and weighing 170 pounds (77 kg), Linthicum played as a forward and became UCLA's first accomplished basketball player. As a sophomore in 1928–29, he garnered mention as one of the best players on the West Coast. He dropped out of school for a year to get married, returning for the 1930–31 season. On December 29, 1930, he made a field goal with under 30 seconds remaining for a 29–28 win over Montana. That season, Linthicum was named a first-team All-American by the Helms Athletic Foundation. He was named team captain as a senior in 1931–32, when he was voted second-team All-American by College Humor. Also named as an All-American with Linthicum in both seasons was Purdue's John Wooden, who later coached UCLA to 10 national championships.

UCLA's first All-American in any sport, Linthicum was also an all-conference selection in the Pacific Coast Conference (PCC) in 1931, and was voted twice to the conference's All-Southern Division. He finished his career widely considered by PCC coaches to be the conference's best all-around player in the past decade. Linthicum was named to the PCC's Southern Division all-time team as a third-team member in 1948. He was inducted posthumously into the UCLA Athletics Hall of Fame in 1987.

After his playing career ended, Linthicum was a UCLA assistant coach and scout for five seasons. In 1935, he was a player-coach for a U.S. all-star team that toured the Far East at the request of the government of Japan. The team went undefeated, and its core later played on the 1936 Olympic team and won the gold medal; Linthicum was not on the Olympic team.

== Outside basketball ==
Linthicum spent eight years with Columbia Pictures as a business manager. He was then in the Navy for 10 years, as an intelligence officer. He was initially in the South Pacific during World War II, and later served in Asia, Europe, and the Mediterranean. Afterwards, Linthicum worked in the CIA for 16 years, supervising various activities, with executive-level assignments in Washington, D.C., Europe, and the Middle East. He retired in 1968, when he received the CIA Certificate of Merit.

== Personal life ==
Linthicum married his wife in 1930, but they divorced in 1938. They had one son.

Linthicum died of cancer in 1979 at age 70.
