= 1930–31 UCLA Bruins men's basketball team =

American college basketball season

1930–31 UCLA Bruins men's basketball
- Conference: Pacific Coast Conference
- South
- Record: 9–6 (4–5 PCC)
- Head coach: Caddy Works (10th season)
- Assistant coaches: Silas Gibbs; Wilbur Johns

1930–31 Pacific Coast Conference men's basketball standings
	Conf.				Overall
Team	W		L	PCT	W		L	PCT
North
Washington †	14	–	2	.875	25	–	3	.893
Washington State	10	–	6	.625	18	–	7	.720
Oregon State	9	–	7	.563	19	–	9	.679
Oregon	6	–	10	.375	12	–	10	.545
Idaho	1	–	15	.063	3	–	16	.158
South
California	6	–	3	.667	12	–	10	.545
USC	5	–	4	.556	8	–	8	.500
UCLA	4	–	5	.444	9	–	6	.600
Stanford	3	–	0	1.000	8	–	9	.471
† Conference playoff series winner

The 1930–31 UCLA Bruins men's basketball team represented the University of California, Los Angeles during the 1930–31 NCAA men's basketball season and were members of the Pacific Coast Conference. The Bruins were led by tenth year head coach Caddy Works. They finished the regular season with a record of 9–6 and were third in the southern division with a record of 4–5. Dick Linthicum became UCLA's first All-American in any sport.

== Previous season ==
The Bruins finished the regular season with a record of 14–8 and were third in the southern division with a record of 3–6.

== Roster ==
1930–31 UCLA Bruins men's basketball team
Players
Coaches

Pos.	#	Name	Height	Weight	Year	Hometown
C		Carson Binkley	—	—	So
G	33	George Brotemarkle	—	—
F		Bill Gilbert	—	—
C		Carl Knowles (C)	—	—
G		Ted Lemcke	—	—
F	26	Dick Linthicum	—	—
C		Frank Lubin	6 ft 5 in (1.96 m)	232 lb (105 kg)		Los Angeles, California
G		Dudley Tower	—	—
F		Dick von Hagen	—	—

Head coach

Caddy Works

Assistant coach(es)

- Wilbur Johns (UCLA)
- Silas Gibbs (UCLA)

Legend

- (C) Team captain
- (S) Suspended
- (I) Ineligible
- (W) Walk-on
- Injured
- Current redshirt

Roster
Last update: 30 January 2018

== Schedule ==
Date time, TV	Rank^{#}	Opponent^{#}	Result	Record	Site city, state
Regular Season
*		at Whittier	W 57–23	1–0	Whittier, CA
*		Pomona	W 43–15	2–0	Physical Education Building; Los Angeles, CA
*		Hollywood Athletic Club	W 42–34	3–0	Physical Education Building; Los Angeles, CA
*		Los Angeles Athletic Club	L 24–41	3–1	Physical Education Building; Los Angeles, CA
*		Montana	W 28–27	4–1	Physical Education Building; Los Angeles, CA
*		Montana	W 59–27	5–1	Physical Education Building; Los Angeles, CA
		at Stanford	W 32–23	6–1 (1–0)	Stanford Pavilion; Stanford, CA
		at Montana	W 28–26	7–1 (2–0)	Stanford Pavilion; Stanford, CA
		at California	L 24–26	7–2 (2–1)	Harmon Gym; Berkeley, CA
		USC	W 25–16	8–2 (3–1)	Physical Education Building; Los Angeles, CA
		Stanford	L 28–29	8–3 (3–2)	Stanford Pavilion; Stanford, CA
		at California	L 39–43	8–4 (3–3)	Harmon Gym; Berkeley, CA
		at California	L 28–30	8–5 (3–4)	Harmon Gym; Berkeley, CA
		USC	L 22–24	8–6 (3–5)	Physical Education Building; Los Angeles, CA
		USC	W 46–23	9–6 (4–5)	Physical Education Building; Los Angeles, CA
*Non-conference game. ^{#}Rankings from AP Poll. (#) Tournament seedings in parentheses. All times are in Pacific Time.

== Awards and honors ==
- Dick Linthicum, first-team All-American – Helms
