= Northwestern Wildcats men's basketball =

Men's basketball team of Northwestern University

2026–27 Northwestern Wildcats men's basketball team
- University: Northwestern University
- First season: 1904–05; 122 years ago
- Athletic director: Mark Jackson
- Head coach: Chris Collins; 14th season, 209–209 (.500)
- Location: Evanston, Illinois
- Arena: Welsh–Ryan Arena (capacity: 7,039)
- NCAA division: Division I
- Conference: Big Ten
- Nickname: Wildcats
- Colors: Purple and white
- Student section: Wildside
- All-time record: 1,196–1,632–1 (.423)
- NCAA tournament record: 3–3 (.500)

NCAA Division I tournament round of 32
- 2017, 2023, 2024

NCAA Division I tournament appearances
- 2017, 2023, 2024

Pre-tournament Helms national champions
- 1930–31

Conference regular-season champions
- Big Ten: 1931, 1933

Uniforms
Home	Away

The Northwestern Wildcats men's basketball team is an NCAA Division I college basketball team representing Northwestern University in the Big Ten Conference. Men's basketball was introduced at Northwestern in 1901. Since 2013, the team has been coached by Chris Collins. The Wildcats have advanced to the NCAA tournament three times, in 2017, 2023, and 2024, after being the only longstanding member of a Power Five conference to have never made the tournament. The Wildcats have won two Big Ten conference championships (1931 and 1933).

== History ==
Northwestern began its inaugural season of intercollegiate play in 1904–05, losing its first game to the University of Chicago 19–34. They went 2–2 in their first season, losing to the University of Chicago twice, and defeating Beloit and Iowa.

Although Northwestern had great success in the early 20th century, it has spent most of the time since World War II in the bottom half of the Big Ten. The Wildcats were retroactively selected as the 1930–31 national champion by both the Helms Athletic Foundation and the Premo-Porretta Power Poll; while the NCAA lists the historical Helms selections for reference, neither the Helms nor the Premo-Porretta titles are officially recognized as NCAA national championships. Northwestern has won only one other conference title, in 1933. It has only finished better than fourth place twice since World War II, and did not have a winning record in conference play from 1968 until 2017. Only the 2003–04 team managed a .500 conference record during that time. On March 1, 2017, the Wildcats won their 10th conference game (a 67–65 win over Michigan) to clinch their first winning Big Ten record in almost half a century. That season also saw the Wildcats make their first NCAA tournament in school history, winning their first NCAA tournament game 68–66 against Vanderbilt. The Wildcats have also appeared in the National Invitation Tournament seven times (1983, 1994, 1999, 2009–2012).

The first NCAA tournament championship was held at Northwestern in March 1939. Until making their first NCAA tournament in 2017, Northwestern had been one of five original NCAA Division I schools and the only school from a power conference to have never played an NCAA tournament game. Northwestern won its first tournament game, defeating Vanderbilt 68–66. The Wildcats lost in the second round to No. 1-seeded Gonzaga.

In 1998, two former players were charged and convicted for sports bribery, having been paid to shave points in games against three other Big Ten schools during the 1995 season.

The 2022–23 team finished in a tie for second place in the Big Ten regular season, its best finish in the conference since the 1958–59 season.

== Coaching history ==
Coach	Years	Record	Conference record	Conference titles
Tom Holland	1904–1905	2–2	0–0	
Louis Gillesby	1906–1910	4–28	1–13	
Stuart Templeton	1910–1911	3–15	1–12	
Charles Hammett	1911–1912	4–9	0–8	
Dennis Grady	1912–1914	25–10	13–7	
Fred Murphy	1914–1917	28–24	16–18	
Norman Elliott	1917–1918, 1919–1920	10–11	7–9	
Tom Robinson	1918–1919	6–6	6–4	
Ray Elder	1920–1921	2–12	1–11	
Dana Evans	1921–1922	7–11	3–9	
Maury Kent	1922–1927	19–62	11–49	
Arthur Lonborg	1927–1950	236–203–1	138–141	2
Harold Olsen	1950–1952	19–25	11–17	
Waldo Fisher	1952–1957	35–75	21–53	
William Rohr	1957–1963	66–70	39–45	
Larry Glass	1963–1969	61–71	33–45	
Brad Snyder	1969–1973	30–71	16–46	
Tex Winter	1973–1978	42–89	25–61	
Rich Falk	1978–1986	77–144	32–112	
Bill Foster	1986–1993	54–141	13–113	
Ricky Byrdsong	1993–1997	34–78	10–62	
Kevin O'Neill	1997–2000	30–56	19–39	
Bill Carmody	2000–2013	192–210	70–150	
Chris Collins	2013–present	162–163	67–121	
Totals		1,148–1,586–1	519–1,083	2

== Postseason ==
=== NCAA Division I tournament results ===
The Wildcats have appeared in the NCAA tournament three times. Their record is 3–3.

Year	Seed	Round	Opponent	Result
2017	No. 8	First round Second round	No. 9 Vanderbilt; No. 1 Gonzaga	W 68–66; L 73–79
2023	No. 7	First round Second round	No. 10 Boise State; No. 2 UCLA	W 75–67; L 63–68
2024	No. 9	First round Second round	No. 8 Florida Atlantic; No. 1 UConn	W 77–65 ^{OT} L 58–75

=== NIT results ===
The Wildcats have appeared in the National Invitation Tournament (NIT) seven times. Their combined record is 5–7.

Year	Round	Opponent	Result
1983	First round Second round	Notre Dame; DePaul	W 71–57; L 63–65
1994	First round Second round	DePaul; Xavier	W 69–68; L 79–83
1999	First round	DePaul	L 64–69
2009	First round	Tulsa	L 59–68
2010	First round	Rhode Island	L 64–76
2011	First round Second round Quarterfinals	Milwaukee; Boston College; Washington State	W 70–61; W 85–67; L 66–69 ^{OT}
2012	First round Second round	Akron; Washington	W 76–74; L 55–76

== Notable players ==
=== All-time statistical leaders ===
==== Career leaders ====
- Points scored: Nick Martinelli (2,187, 2020–2024)
- Assists: Bryant McIntosh (700, 2014–2018)
- Rebounds: Evan Eschmeyer (995, 1995–1999)
- Steals: Pat Baldwin (272, 1990–1994)
- Blocks: Alexandru Olah (181, 2013–2016)

==== Single-season leaders ====
- Points scored: Nick Martinelli (759, 2026)
- Assists: Bryant McIntosh (213, 2016)
- Rebounds: Jim Pitts (321, 1966)
- Steals: Pat Baldwin (90, 1991)
- Blocks: Jim Pitts (123, 1966)

==== Single-game leaders ====
- Points scored: Rich Falk (49, 1964)
- Assists: Bryant McIntosh (16, 2018)
- Rebounds: Jim Pitts (29, 1965)
- Steals: Nate Carter (9, 2011)
- Blocks: Jim Pitts (10, 1966)

Source for all statistical leaders:

=== All-Americans ===
Player	Year(s)	Team(s)
Joe Reiff	1931	Consensus First Team – Helms (1st), College Humor (1st)
Joe Reiff	1932	College Humor (3rd)
Joe Reiff	1933	Consensus First Team – Helms (1st), College Humor (1st)
Otto Graham	1943	Consensus Second Team – Converse (3rd), Sporting News (1st)
Otto Graham	1944	Consensus First Team – Helms (1st), Converse (2nd), Pic (1st), Sporting News (1st)
Max Morris	1945	Consensus Second Team – Helms (1st), Converse (3rd), Argosy (3rd), Sporting News (3rd)
Max Morris	1946	Consensus First Team – Helms (1st), Converse (1st), True (2nd), Sporting News (1st)
Ray Ragelis	1951	Look (3rd)
Frank Ehmann	1955	Look (1st)
Joe Ruklick	1959	AP (3rd), NABC (3rd)
Jim Burns	1967	AP (3rd), NABC (3rd)
Evan Eschmeyer	1999	Consensus Second Team – AP (2nd), USBWA (2nd), NABC (2nd), Sporting News (2nd)
