= Mally Johnson =

American basketball and football player (1908–1969)

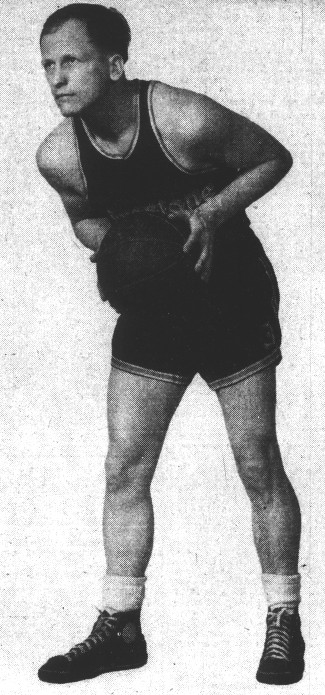
- Johnson, circa 1939

Personal information
- Born: February 4, 1908 Marshall, Minnesota, U.S.
- Died: September 16, 1969 (aged 61) San Leandro, California, U.S.
- Listed height: 5 ft 10 in (1.78 m)
- Listed weight: 165 lb (75 kg)

Career information
- High school: Marshall (Marshall, Minnesota)
- College: NC State (1927–1930)
- Position: Guard / forward

Career history
- 1930–1931: Cudahy Athletic Club
- 1937–1939: Akron Firestone Non-Skids

Career highlights
- NBL champion (1939); Second-team All-American – College Humor (1930)

Morris William "Mally" Johnson (February 4, 1908 – September 16, 1969) was an American professional basketball player. He played for the Akron Firestone Non-Skids in the National Basketball League for two seasons and averaged 2.1 points per game.

In college, Johnson played football and basketball for NC State, where he was named the school's first All-American in basketball.
