= 1930–31 Kansas Jayhawks men's basketball team =

American college basketball season

1930–31 Kansas Jayhawks men's basketball

Big Six Champions
- Conference: Big Six Conference
- Record: 15–3 (7–3 Big 6)
- Head coach: Phog Allen (14th season)
- Captain: Tom Bishop
- Home arena: Hoch Auditorium

1930–31 Big Six Conference men's basketball standings
	Conf.				Overall
Team	W		L	PCT	W		L	PCT
Kansas	7	–	3	.700	15	–	3	.833
Nebraska	6	–	4	.600	9	–	9	.500
Kansas State	5	–	5	.500	11	–	6	.647
Missouri	5	–	5	.500	8	–	9	.471
Iowa State	4	–	6	.400	8	–	8	.500
Oklahoma	3	–	7	.300	10	–	8	.556

The 1930–31 Kansas Jayhawks men's basketball team represented the University of Kansas during the 1930–31 college men's basketball season.

== Roster ==
- Ralph Baker
- Tom Bishop
- Forrest Cox
- William Johnson
- Theodore O'Leary
- Leland Page
- Floyd Ramsey

== Schedule ==
Date time, TV	Rank^{#}	Opponent^{#}	Result	Record	Site city, state
December 16		Washburn	W 27–19	1-0	Topeka, KS
December 20		vs. Missouri; Border War	W 40–26	2-0	Convention Hall; Kansas City, MO
December 30*		at Kansas Wesleyan	W 47–15	3-0	Salina, KS
January 2*		vs. Colorado	W 34–25	4-0	Denver Auditorium Arena; Denver, CO
December 3*		vs. Colorado	W 36–28	5-0	Denver Auditorium Arena; Denver, CO
January 5*		at Colorado	W 25–19	6-0	Carlson Gymnasium; Boulder, CO
January 12		Oklahoma	W 44–22	7-0 (1-0)	Hoch Auditorium; Lawrence, KS
January 17		at Kansas State; Sunflower Showdown	W 37–29	8-0 (2-0)	Nichols Hall; Lawrence, KS
January 10		Nebraska	L 30–31	8-1 (2-1)	Hoch Auditorium; Lawrence, KS
January 22		at Iowa State	W 34–27	9-1 (3-1)	State Gymnasium; Ames, IA
January 29		Missouri; Border War	W 31–13	10-1 (4-1)	Hoch Auditorium; Lawrence, KS
February 3*		Oklahoma A&M	W 31–29	11-1	Hoch Auditorium; Lawrence, KS
February 7		at Oklahoma	L 30–33	11-2 (4-2)	Field House; Norman, OK
February 14		Nebraska	W 34–29	12-2 (5-2)	Nebraska Coliseum; Lincoln, NE
February 17		Kansas State; Sunflower Showdown	W 40–26	13-2 (6-2)	Hoch Auditorium; Lawrence, KS
February 23		Iowa State	W 27–16	14-2 (7-2)	Hoch Auditorium; Lawrence, KS
February 27		at Missouri; Border War	L 19–26	14-3 (7-3)	Brewer Fieldhouse; Columbia, MO
March 3*		Creighton	W 38–32	15-3	Hoch Auditorium; Lawrence, KS
*Non-conference game. ^{#}Rankings from AP Poll. (#) Tournament seedings in parentheses.
