= 1930–31 Wisconsin Badgers men's basketball team =

American college basketball season

1930–31 Wisconsin Badgers men's basketball
- Conference: Big Ten Conference
- Record: 8–9 (4–8 Big Ten)
- Head coach: Walter Meanwell
- Home arena: UW Fieldhouse

1930–31 Big Ten Conference men's basketball standings
	Conf.				Overall
Team	W		L	PCT	W		L	PCT
Northwestern	11	–	1	.917	16	–	1	.941
Michigan	8	–	4	.667	13	–	4	.765
Minnesota	8	–	4	.667	13	–	4	.765
Purdue	8	–	4	.667	12	–	5	.706
Illinois	7	–	5	.583	12	–	5	.706
Indiana	5	–	7	.417	9	–	8	.529
Chicago	4	–	8	.333	8	–	9	.471
Wisconsin	4	–	8	.333	8	–	9	.471
Ohio State	3	–	9	.250	4	–	13	.235
Iowa	2	–	10	.167	5	–	12	.294

The 1930–31 Wisconsin Badgers men's basketball team represented University of Wisconsin–Madison. The head coach was Walter Meanwell, coaching his seventeenth season with the Badgers. The team played their home games at the UW Fieldhouse in Madison, Wisconsin and was a member of the Big Ten Conference.

== Schedule ==
Date time, TV	Rank^{#}	Opponent^{#}	Result	Record	Site city, state
Regular Season
12/13/1930*		Carroll (WI)	W 17–14	1–0	UW Fieldhouse; Madison, Wisconsin
12/18/1930*		Pennsylvania	W 25–12	2–0	UW Fieldhouse; Madison, Wisconsin
12/22/1930*		Missouri	W 37–9	3–0	UW Fieldhouse; Madison, Wisconsin
12/30/1930*		at Marquette	L 14–16	3–1	Marquette Gymnasium; Milwaukee
1/05/1931		at Illinois	W 12–9	4–1 (1–0)	Huff Hall; Champaign, Illinois
1/10/1931		at Ohio State	L 19–29	4–2 (1–1)	Ohio Expo Center Coliseum; Columbus, Ohio
1/12/1931		at Michigan	L 17–23	4–3 (1–2)	Yost Field House; Ann Arbor, Michigan
1/17/1931		Iowa	W 24–13	5–3 (2–2)	UW Fieldhouse; Madison, Wisconsin
1/19/1931		at Minnesota	L 26–28	5–4 (2–3)	Minnesota Field House; Minneapolis
1/24/1931		Illinois	W 30–20	6–4 (3–3)	UW Fieldhouse; Madison, Wisconsin
2/09/1931*		Washington (MO)	W 39–9	7–4	UW Fieldhouse; Madison, Wisconsin
2/14/1931		Minnesota	L 15–42	7–5 (3–4)	UW Fieldhouse; Madison, Wisconsin
2/16/1931		at Iowa	L 17–19	7–6 (3–5)	Iowa Field House; Iowa City, IA
2/21/1931		at Purdue	L 27–46	7–7 (3–6)	Memorial Gymnasium; West Lafayette, Indiana
2/23/1931		Ohio State	W 28–24	8–7 (4–6)	UW Fieldhouse; Madison, Wisconsin
2/28/1931		Michigan	L 15–26	8–8 (4–7)	UW Fieldhouse; Madison, Wisconsin
3/02/1931		Purdue	L 17–24	8–9 (4–8)	UW Fieldhouse; Madison, Wisconsin
*Non-conference game. ^{#}Rankings from AP Poll. (#) Tournament seedings in parentheses.
