= 1930–31 Indiana Hoosiers men's basketball team =

American college basketball season

1930–31 Indiana Hoosiers men's basketball
- Conference: Big Ten Conference
- Record: 9–8 (5–7 Big Ten)
- Head coach: Everett Dean (7th season)
- Captain: Bernard Miller
- Home arena: The Fieldhouse

1930–31 Big Ten Conference men's basketball standings
	Conf.				Overall
Team	W		L	PCT	W		L	PCT
Northwestern	11	–	1	.917	16	–	1	.941
Michigan	8	–	4	.667	13	–	4	.765
Minnesota	8	–	4	.667	13	–	4	.765
Purdue	8	–	4	.667	12	–	5	.706
Illinois	7	–	5	.583	12	–	5	.706
Indiana	5	–	7	.417	9	–	8	.529
Chicago	4	–	8	.333	8	–	9	.471
Wisconsin	4	–	8	.333	8	–	9	.471
Ohio State	3	–	9	.250	4	–	13	.235
Iowa	2	–	10	.167	5	–	12	.294

The 1930–31 Indiana Hoosiers men's basketball team represented Indiana University. Their head coach was Everett Dean, who was in his 7th year. The team played its home games in The Fieldhouse in Bloomington, Indiana, and was a member of the Big Ten Conference.

The Hoosiers finished the regular season with an overall record of 9–8 and a conference record of 5–7, finishing 6th in the Big Ten Conference.

== Roster ==
No.	Name	Position	Ht.	Year	Hometown
2	Lucian Ashby	F	5–11	Sr.	Evansville, Indiana
3	Paul Jasper	C	6–2	Sr.	Fort Wayne, Indiana
5	Bernard Dickey	F/C	6–1	So.	Fort Wayne, Indiana
8	Claron Veller	G	5–9	Sr.	Linton, Indiana
9	Joseph Zeller	G	6–1	Jr.	East Chicago, Indiana
10	Bill Blagrave	G	6–2	Jr.	Washington, Indiana
11	Bernard Miller	F	6–1	Sr.	Waldron, Indiana
12	Jay Campbell	F	5–7	Jr.	Shelbyville, Indiana
13	Glendon Hodson	F	6–1	So.	Amo, Indiana
15	Victor Dauer	F	5–11	Jr.	Gary, Indiana
19	Jacob Bretz	F	6–1	Sr.	Huntingburg, Indiana
21	Maurice Massy	G	6–1	N/A	Indianapolis, Indiana
22	George Reed	C	6–3	N/A	Kokomo, Indiana
N/A	Taylor Hoffar	C	6–1	So.	Seymour, Indiana
N/A	Franklin Rainbolt	F	6–3	N/A	Salem, Indiana

== Schedule/results ==
Date time, TV	Rank^{#}	Opponent^{#}	Result	Record	Site city, state
Regular season
12/10/1930*		DePauw	W 26–18	1–0	The Fieldhouse; Bloomington, Indiana
12/18/1930*		Washington (Mo.)	W 17–15	2–0	The Fieldhouse; Bloomington, Indiana
12/31/1930*		at Pennsylvania	W 24–20	3–0	The Palestra; Philadelphia
1/1/1931*		at Pittsburgh	W 27–19	4–0	Pitt Pavilion; Pittsburgh
1/10/1931		Chicago	L 27–28	4–1 (0–1)	The Fieldhouse; Bloomington, Indiana
1/12/1931		Ohio State	W 23–21	5–1 (1–1)	The Fieldhouse; Bloomington, Indiana
1/17/1931		at Illinois; Rivalry	W 35–34	6–1 (2–1)	Huff Hall; Champaign, Illinois
1/19/1931		at Iowa	W 28–20	7–1 (3–1)	Iowa Field House; Iowa City, IA
2/3/1931*		Notre Dame	L 20–25	7–2 (3–1)	The Fieldhouse; Bloomington, Indiana
2/7/1931		Purdue; Rivalry	L 23–30	7–3 (3–2)	The Fieldhouse; Bloomington, Indiana
2/9/1931		Iowa	W 31–18	8–3 (4–2)	The Fieldhouse; Bloomington, Indiana
2/14/1931		at Purdue; Rivalry	L 15–28	8–4 (4–3)	Memorial Gymnasium; West Lafayette, Indiana
2/21/1931		at Michigan	L 24–33	8–5 (4–4)	Yost Field House; Ann Arbor, Michigan
2/23/1931		Illinois; Rivalry	L 25–39	8–6 (4–5)	The Fieldhouse; Bloomington, Indiana
2/28/1931		at Chicago	W 33–22	9–6 (5–5)	Bartlett Gymnasium; Chicago, Illinois
3/2/1931		at Ohio State	L 15–31	9–7 (5–6)	Ohio Expo Center Coliseum; Columbus, Ohio
3/7/1931		Michigan	L 20–21	9–8 (5–7)	The Fieldhouse; Bloomington, Indiana
*Non-conference game. ^{#}Rankings from AP Poll. (#) Tournament seedings in parentheses.
