= 1930–31 Iowa State Cyclones men's basketball team =

American college basketball season

1930–31 Iowa State Cyclones men's basketball
- Conference: Big Six Conference
- Record: 8–8 (4–6 Big Six)
- Head coach: Louis Menze (3rd season)
- Home arena: State Gymnasium

1930–31 Big Six Conference men's basketball standings
	Conf.				Overall
Team	W		L	PCT	W		L	PCT
Kansas	7	–	3	.700	15	–	3	.833
Nebraska	6	–	4	.600	9	–	9	.500
Kansas State	5	–	5	.500	11	–	6	.647
Missouri	5	–	5	.500	8	–	9	.471
Iowa State	4	–	6	.400	8	–	8	.500
Oklahoma	3	–	7	.300	10	–	8	.556

The 1930–31 Iowa State Cyclones men's basketball team represented Iowa State University during the 1930–31 NCAA men's basketball season. The Cyclones were coached by Louis Menze, who was in his third season with the Cyclones. They played their home games at the State Gymnasium in Ames, Iowa.

They finished the season 8–8, 4–6 in Big Six play to finish in fifth place.

== Roster ==
1930–31 Iowa State Cyclones men's basketball team
Players
Coaches

Pos.	#	Name	Height	Weight	Year	Hometown
G		Roger Bowen	—	—	So
F		H.G. Bowes	—	—	Jr
G		G.C. Brown	—	—	So
F		Frank Burrell	—	—	So
G		Clark Craghead	—	—	So
F		R.L. Curtis	—	—	So
G		Clyde Dills	—	—	So
G		W.F. Ellgen	—	—	So
F		W.L. Graves	—	—	So
G		Dick Hawk (C)	5 ft 10 in (1.78 m)	—	Jr
C		Albert Heitman (C)	6 ft 4 in (1.93 m)	—	Jr	Keystone, Iowa
G		Herman Holmes	—	—	Jr	Gilbert, Iowa
G		Wendell King	—	—	Jr
F		Isadore Levine	—	—	So
F		Adolph Ludwig	—	—	So	Lawton, Iowa
G		T.H. Manship	—	—	So
		Gordon Nagel	—	—	Jr
G		Max Rieke	6 ft 6 in (1.98 m)	—	Jr	Blairstown, Iowa
F		Jack Roadcap	—	—	Jr
F		C.A. Rogers	—	—	So
F		C.A. Saddoris	—	—	Sr
F		Ralph Thomson	6 ft 3 in (1.91 m)	—	So	Omaha, Nebraska
G		W.H. Walker	—	—	So
F		R.A. Wilcox	—	—	So
F		Burnett Zimmerman	—	—	Sr

Head coach

- Louis Menze

Assistant coach(es)

Legend

- (C) Team captain
- (S) Suspended
- (I) Ineligible
- (W) Walk-on
- Injured
- Current redshirt

== Schedule and results ==
Date time, TV	Rank^{#}	Opponent^{#}	Result	Record	Site city, state
Regular season
December 19, 1930*		Simpson	W 39–12	1–0	State Gymnasium; Ames, Iowa
December 31, 1930*; 7:30 pm		at Drake; Iowa Big Four	W 17–16	2–0	Drake Fieldhouse; Des Moines, Iowa
January 5, 1931*		at Minnesota	L 17–29	2–1	Minnesota Fieldhouse; Minneapolis, Minnesota
January 10, 1931; 7:30 pm		Oklahoma	W 35–25	3–1 (1–0)	State Gymnasium; Ames, Iowa
January 17, 1931		at Missouri	L 18–20	3–2 (1–1)	Brewer Fieldhouse; Columbia, Missouri
January 22, 1931		Kansas	L 27–34	3–3 (1–2)	State Gymnasium; Ames, Iowa
January 24, 1931*		at Creighton	L 16–44	3–4	University Gym; Omaha, Nebraska
January 30, 1931		at Kansas State	W 41–36	4–4 (2–2)	Nichols Hall; Manhattan, Kansas
January 31, 1931		at Nebraska	L 19–31	4–5 (2–3)	Nebraska Coliseum; Lincoln, Nebraska
February 5, 1931		Missouri	W 29–19	5–5 (3–3)	State Gymnasium; Ames, Iowa
February 10, 1931*; 7:45 pm		at Drake; Iowa Big Four	W 23–20	6–5	Drake Fieldhouse; Des Moines, Iowa
February 13, 1931		Kansas State	L 24–38	6–6 (3–4)	State Gymnasium; Ames, Iowa
February 16, 1931		Nebraska	W 42–28	7–6 (4–4)	State Gymnasium; Ames, Iowa
February 21, 1931		at Oklahoma	L 21–26	7–7 (4–5)	OU Field House; Norman, Oklahoma
February 23, 1931		at Kansas	L 16–27	7–8 (4–6)	Hoch Auditorium; Lawrence, Kansas
February 26, 1931*		Drake; Iowa Big Four	W 39–21	8–8	State Gymnasium; Ames, Iowa
*Non-conference game. ^{#}Rankings from AP poll. (#) Tournament seedings in parentheses. All times are in Central Time.
