= 1931 College Basketball All-Southern Team =

The 1931 College Basketball All-Southern Team consisted of basketball players from the South chosen at their respective positions.

== All-Southerns ==
=== Guards ===
- Louis Berger, Maryland (AP)
- Edward Ronkin, Maryland (AP)

=== Forwards ===
- Louis McGinnis, Kentucky (AP)
- Carey Spicer, Kentucky (AP)

=== Center ===
- George Yates, Kentucky (AP)

== Key ==
- AP = chosen by the Associated Press.
