= Carey Spicer =

American athlete

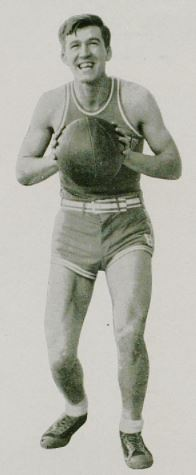
- Spicer as a senior at Kentucky

Personal information
- Born: April 23, 1909 Lexington, Kentucky, U.S.
- Died: December 5, 1996 (aged 87) Indianapolis, Indiana, U.S.
- Listed height: 6 ft 1 in (1.85 m)

Career information
- High school: Lexington (Lexington, Kentucky)
- College: Kentucky (1928–1931)
- Position: Power forward
- Coaching career: 1931–1935

Career history

Coaching
- 1931–1935: Georgetown (Kentucky)

Career highlights
- 2× First-team All-American – Helms (1929, 1931); 3× All-SoCon (1929–1931)

Carey Alvin Spicer Jr. (April 23, 1909 – December 5, 1996) was a two-time All-American basketball player at the University of Kentucky. He captained Adolph Rupp's first team in 1930–31, and became Rupp's first All-American. He was also quarterback for the football team and played varsity tennis and ran track. Rupp called him "one of the greatest athletes in University of Kentucky history."

== Early life ==
Spicer, was born in Lexington, Kentucky, on April 23, 1909. His father was a grocer. He, his brother William and his sister Stella were natural athletes who went on to play college basketball. William and Carey at Kentucky, and Stella at Georgetown College, one of the few schools with a women's college basketball program. Spicer was one of the top football and basketball players ever at the old Lexington High School. He made the All-State team in basketball, and 1926 All-State Tournament team and was president of his senior class.

== Basketball ==
Spicer was a two-time All-American and three-time All-Conference forward for the University of Kentucky basketball team. He won All-American honors under two different coaches, first John Mauer in 1929 and then Adolph Rupp in 1931. He was captain of Adolph Rupp's first basketball team in 1930-31 and was the team's leading scorer. That season, he scored 27 points in a 42–37 victory over Vanderbilt. He also set the then Southern Conference record for most points in a tournament game when he scored 22 points against Florida. He led Kentucky their second Southern Conference regular season championship and then to their first-ever tournament championship game where they lost to Maryland by 2 points.

In 1991, Spicer was in the second class of Kentucky basketball players to have his jersey retired, along with Louie Dampier and Jack Givens.

=== Records ===
- Southern Conference - Most points, tournament game (22), record surpassed by Joe Holup in 1954

== Other sports ==
Spicer was an excellent all-around athlete. As a halfback, and quarterback in football he set several records that stood for more than 40 years. He scored 11 touchdowns and 75 points for Kentucky to lead the Southern Conference in scoring in the 1930 season. He was named an AP star of the week after he scored three touchdowns against Virginia Military Institute in 1930. He also played tennis and ran track at Kentucky.

=== Records ===
- Kentucky, most touchdowns, season (11), surpassed by Babe Parilli in 1950
- Kentucky, most points, season (75), surpassed by Moe Williams in 1995

== Later life ==
After graduating, Spicer coached basketball and football and served as athletic director at Georgetown College in Georgetown, Kentucky, from 1931 to 1935. The Tigers basketball program went 12–43, including 0–3 versus Kentucky, over four seasons of basketball and a 13–20–2 record over four seasons of football. During World War II he was a captain in the United States Army. After returning from the war, he went to work for Spalding Sporting Goods Company selling equipment for a sport that he was never very good at—golf. Later, in 1979, he opened his own business, Carey Spicer and Associates in Carmel, IN, which continued to sell golf and sporting equipment. He married Katherine Drury, his high school sweetheart, and they had two children. Spicer died December 5, 1996, from cancer.
