= Frank Ward (basketball) =

American basketball player (1904–1980)

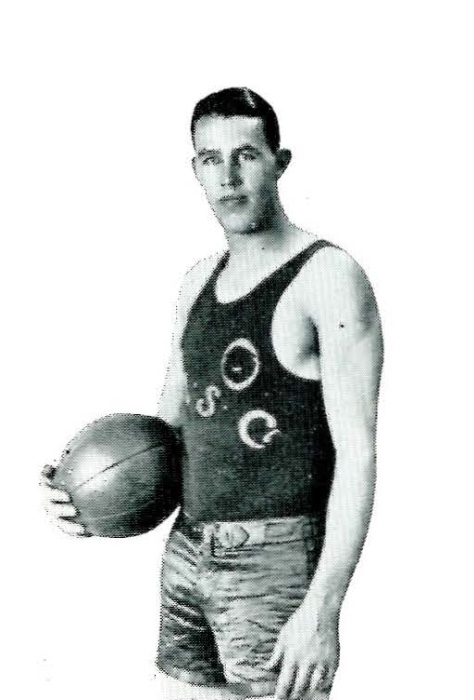
- Ward from the 1930 Montanan

Personal information
- Born: September 23, 1904 Parowan, Utah
- Died: February 14, 1980 (aged 75) Sheridan, Wyoming
- Listed height: 6 ft 4 in (1.93 m)

Career information
- High school: Parowan (Parowan, Utah)
- College: Montana State (1926–1930)
- Position: Center

Career highlights
- Helms national champion (1929); Consensus All-American (1930); First-team All-American – Helms (1929)

Frank Whitney Ward (September 23, 1904 – February 14, 1980) was an American basketball player who is best known for playing on the dominant teams of Montana State in the late 1920s. Ward, a 6 ft 4 in (1.93 m) center, played for coach G. Ott Romney, a man credited with implementing the fast break style of play in basketball. Montana State won three conference championships during Ward's tenure, and, in 1928–29, they finished the season with a 35–2 record. They were declared national champions by the Helms Athletic Foundation. Ward was a two-time NCAA All-American, including a consensus selection in 1930.

Following his college career, Ward coached high school basketball in Montana. He died on February 14, 1980, in Sheridan, Wyoming.
