= 1930–31 Illinois Fighting Illini men's basketball team =

American college basketball season

1930–31 Illinois Fighting Illini men's basketball
- Conference: Big Ten Conference
- Record: 12–5 (7-5 Big Ten)
- Head coach: J. Craig Ruby (9th season)
- Assistant coaches: John P. Sabo (3rd season); Carl Voyles (2nd season)
- Captain: Charles Harper
- Home arena: Huff Hall

1930–31 Big Ten Conference men's basketball standings
	Conf.				Overall
Team	W		L	PCT	W		L	PCT
Northwestern	11	–	1	.917	16	–	1	.941
Michigan	8	–	4	.667	13	–	4	.765
Minnesota	8	–	4	.667	13	–	4	.765
Purdue	8	–	4	.667	12	–	5	.706
Illinois	7	–	5	.583	12	–	5	.706
Indiana	5	–	7	.417	9	–	8	.529
Chicago	4	–	8	.333	8	–	9	.471
Wisconsin	4	–	8	.333	8	–	9	.471
Ohio State	3	–	9	.250	4	–	13	.235
Iowa	2	–	10	.167	5	–	12	.294

The 1930–31 Illinois Fighting Illini men's basketball team represented the University of Illinois.

== Regular season ==
The 1930–31 season was head coach Craig Ruby's 9th at the University of Illinois, establishing the first time in the history of Illinois basketball that a head coach remained longer than 8 years. Ruby had 10 returning lettermen from a team that had finished in a fifth place tie in the Big Ten the year before. Even though they did not lose any non-conference games, the Fighting Illini showed no improvement in conference play by finishing with a record of 7 wins and 5 losses, however; the team improved to an overall record of 12 wins 5 losses. The starting lineup included captain Charles Harper, George Fencl and Elbert Kamp at forward, Elbridge May at center with Boyd Owen and Robert Kamp at the guard spots.

=== Roster ===
1930–31 Illinois Fighting Illini men's basketball team
Players
Coaches

Pos.	#	Name	Height	Weight	Year	Hometown
F	3	Charles Harper (C)	5 ft 11 in (1.8 m)	163 lb (74 kg)	Sr	Chandlerville, Illinois
G	4	Robert Kamp	5 ft 10 in (1.78 m)	150 lb (68 kg)	Jr	Mt. Carmel, Illinois
F	5	Elbert Kamp	5 ft 11 in (1.8 m)	150 lb (68 kg)	Jr	Mt. Carmel, Illinois
C	6	Elbridge Horace May	6 ft 4 in (1.93 m)	180 lb (82 kg)	Sr	Chicago, Illinois
G	8	Boyd Owen	6 ft 2 in (1.88 m)	179 lb (81 kg)	So	South Bend, Indiana
G	9	Herbert R. Hill	5 ft 8 in (1.73 m)	145 lb (66 kg)	Sr	Elgin, Illinois
C	10	Caslon Bennett	6 ft 3 in (1.91 m)	185 lb (84 kg)	So	Marshall, Illinois
C	11	Vernon Moore	6 ft 1 in (1.85 m)	156 lb (71 kg)	So	Martinsville, Illinois
F	12	Robert Y. Bartholomew	5 ft 11 in (1.8 m)	155 lb (70 kg)	Jr	Peoria, Illinois
C	14	William Hagerman	6 ft 1 in (1.85 m)	154 lb (70 kg)	So	Champaign, Illinois
G	15	William Theobald	5 ft 11 in (1.8 m)	155 lb (70 kg)	So	Du Quoin, Illinois
F	17	Paul Chervinko	5 ft 7 in (1.7 m)	155 lb (70 kg)	So	Witt, Illinois
F	18	Norval Hodges	6 ft 2 in (1.88 m)	176 lb (80 kg)	So	Flora, Illinois
C	19	Harold Thornburg	6 ft 1 in (1.85 m)	172 lb (78 kg)	Sr	Watseka, Illinois
G	20	Charles R. Canfield	5 ft 11 in (1.8 m)	165 lb (75 kg)	Jr	Maywood, Illinois
G	21	George S. Fencl	5 ft 8 in (1.73 m)	159 lb (72 kg)	Jr	Cicero, Illinois
G	22	David Tarwain	5 ft 10 in (1.78 m)	157 lb (71 kg)	So	Chicago, Illinois
F	23	William Fuzak	6 ft 0 in (1.83 m)	160 lb (73 kg)	Sr	Urbana, Illinois
F	24	Charles Goldstein	5 ft 10 in (1.78 m)	160 lb (73 kg)	So	Chicago, Illinois
F	25	Marvin L. Hadam	5 ft 9 in (1.75 m)	150 lb (68 kg)	Sr	Chicago, Illinois
F	26	Homer Adams	5 ft 11 in (1.8 m)	150 lb (68 kg)	Jr	Pontiac, Illinois
G	27	John Hadley	6 ft 0 in (1.83 m)	160 lb (73 kg)	So	Frankfort, Indiana
G	28	Ralph W. Downing	5 ft 10 in (1.78 m)	150 lb (68 kg)	Jr	Mount Pulaski, Illinois
G	29	Henry Howard	6 ft 0 in (1.83 m)	170 lb (77 kg)	So	Sheffield, Illinois
F	30	Maurice Weintraub	5 ft 6 in (1.68 m)	148 lb (67 kg)	So	Chicago, Illinois
F	31	Herbert B. Scharback	5 ft 10 in (1.78 m)	163 lb (74 kg)	Jr	Hobart, Indiana
F	32	Thomas Plunk	5 ft 8 in (1.73 m)	160 lb (73 kg)	So	Mansfield, Illinois

Head coach

- Craig Ruby (University of Missouri) (9th year)

Assistant coach(es)

- John Sabo (University of Illinois) (3rd year)
- Carl Voyles (Oklahoma A&M) (2nd year)

Legend

- (C) Team captain
- (S) Suspended
- (I) Ineligible
- (W) Walk-on
- Injured
- Current redshirt

Roster

== Schedule ==
Date time, TV	Rank^{#}	Opponent^{#}	Result	Record	Site (attendance) city, state
Non-Conference regular season
12/8/1930*		DePauw	W 27–15	1-0	New Gymnasium (3,625); Champaign, IL
12/13/1930*		Carleton College	W 23–11	2-0	New Gymnasium (4,879); Champaign, IL
12/19/1930*		Miami	W 40–17	3-0	New Gymnasium (1,500); Champaign, IL
12/22/1930*		Wabash	W 28–13	4-0	New Gymnasium (2,473); Champaign, IL
1/1/1931*		at Bradley	W 28–17	5-0	Hewitt Gymnasium (-); Peoria, IL
Big Ten regular season
1/5/1931		Wisconsin	L 9–12	5-1 (0-1)	New Gymnasium (6,696); Champaign, IL
1/10/1931		at Purdue	L 15–30	5-2 (0-2)	Memorial Gymnasium (-); West Lafayette, IN
1/12/1931		Northwestern; Rivalry	L 27–29	5-3 (0-3)	New Gymnasium (7,092); Champaign, IL
1/17/1931		Indiana; Rivalry	L 34–35	5-4 (0-4)	New Gymnasium (6,807); Champaign, IL
1/24/1931		at Wisconsin	L 20–30	5-5 (0-5)	Wisconsin Field House (-); Madison, WI
2/10/1931		Purdue	W 26–22	6-5 (1-5)	New Gymnasium (6,873); Champaign, IL
2/14/1931		at Iowa; Rivalry	W 26–23	7-5 (2-5)	Iowa Field House (-); Iowa City, IA
2/16/1931		at Northwestern; Rivalry	W 35–28	8-5 (3-5)	Patten Gymnasium (5,000); Evanston, IL
2/21/1931		University of Chicago	W 45–22	9-5 (4-5)	New Gymnasium (6,228); Champaign, IL
2/23/1931		at Indiana; Rivalry	W 39-25	10-5 (5-5)	The IU Field House (4,200); Bloomington, IN
2/28/1931		Iowa; Rivalry	W 31–13	11-5 (6-5)	New Gymnasium (6,267); Champaign, IL
3/2/1931		at University of Chicago	W 36–30	12-5 (7-5)	Bartlett Gymnasium (1,900); Chicago, IL
*Non-conference game. ^{#}Rankings from AP Poll. (#) Tournament seedings in parentheses. All times are in Central Time.
