= Paul McBrayer =

American basketball player and coach

Biographical details
- Born: October 12, 1909; Lawrenceburg, Kentucky, U.S.
- Died: January 1, 1999 (aged 89); Lexington, Kentucky, U.S.

Playing career
- 1927–1930: Kentucky

Coaching career (HC unless noted)
- 1934–1943: Kentucky (assistant)
- 1946–1962: Eastern Kentucky

Head coaching record
- Overall: 212–141
- Tournaments: 0–2 (NCAA / NCAA University Division)

Accomplishments and honors

Championships
- 3 OVC regular season (1953, 1959, 1961); 2 OVC tournament (1950, 1955)

Awards
- First-team All-American – Helms (1930)

Paul S. McBrayer (October 12, 1909 – January 1, 1999) was an American college men's basketball coach and player. He was a player from 1927 to 1930 at the University of Kentucky and the head coach at Eastern Kentucky University from 1946 to 1962. He coached Eastern Kentucky to a 214–142 record and two NCAA tournament appearances. As a star player for Kentucky, he was named a 1930 Helms Foundation All-American. He also served as an assistant coach at Kentucky under Adolph Rupp for nine seasons (1934–43) prior to becoming head coach at Eastern Kentucky. The McBrayer Arena at Eastern Kentucky University is named in his honor.

== Head coaching record ==
Record table
Season	Team	Overall	Conference	Standing	Postseason
Eastern Kentucky Colonels (Kentucky Intercollegiate Athletic Conference) (1946–1948)
1946–47	Eastern Kentucky	21–4			
1947–48	Eastern Kentucky	17–7			
Eastern Kentucky Colonels (Ohio Valley Conference) (1948–1962)
1948–49	Eastern Kentucky	17–4	7–3	2nd	
1949–50	Eastern Kentucky	16–6	7–3	2nd	
1950–51	Eastern Kentucky	18–8	8–3	2nd	
1951–52	Eastern Kentucky	13–11	10–2	2nd	
1952–53	Eastern Kentucky	16–9	9–1	1st	NCAA first round
1953–54	Eastern Kentucky	7–16	4–6	T–4th	
1954–55	Eastern Kentucky	15–8	6–4	T–2nd	
1955–56	Eastern Kentucky	9–16	3–7	5th	
1956–57	Eastern Kentucky	6–15	4–6	4th	
1957–58	Eastern Kentucky	8–11	3–7	6th	
1958–59	Eastern Kentucky	16–6	10–2	1st	NCAA University Division first round
1959–60	Eastern Kentucky	14–8	9–3	2nd	
1960–61	Eastern Kentucky	15–9	9–3	T–1st	
1961–62	Eastern Kentucky	4–3	2–1		
Eastern Kentucky:		212–141 (.601)	91–51 (.641)		
Total:		212–141 (.601)			
National champion Postseason invitational champion Conference regular season champion Conference regular season and conference tournament champion Division regular season champion Division regular season and conference tournament champion Conference tournament champion
