= 1930 NCAA Men's Basketball All-Americans =

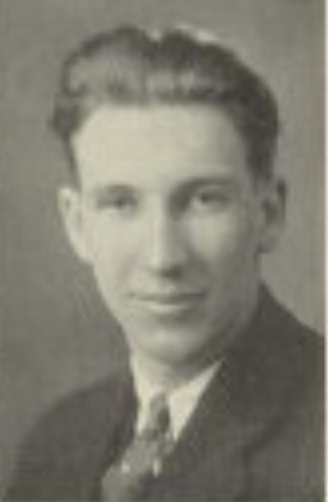
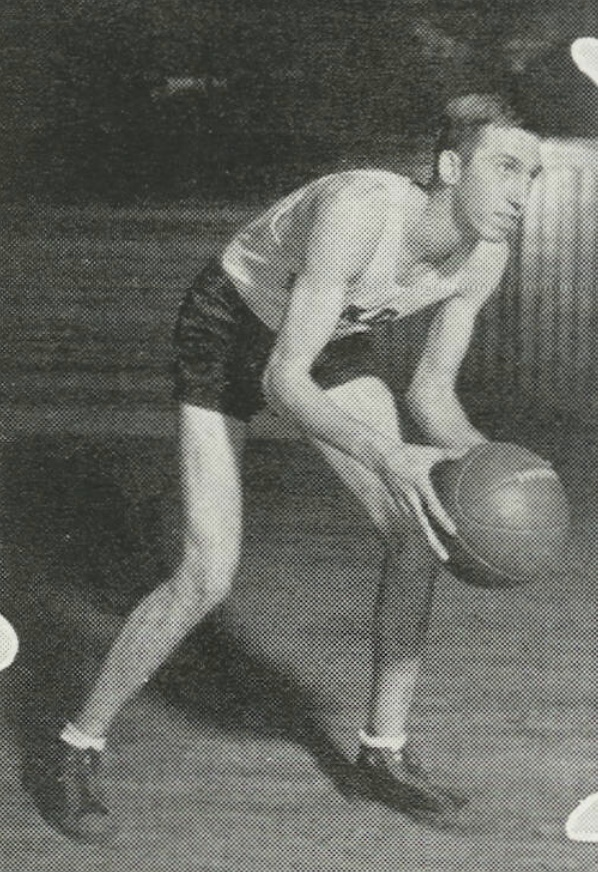
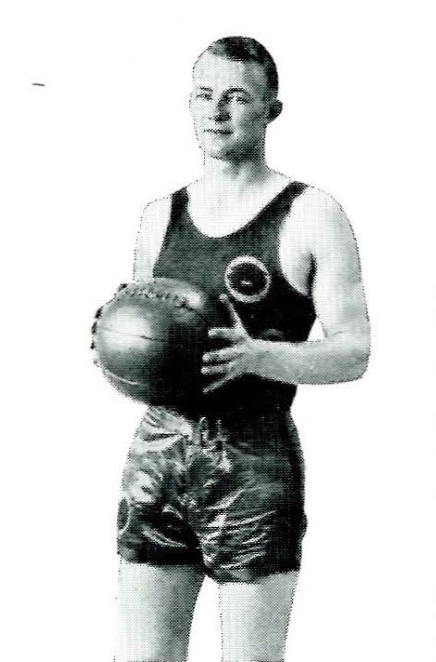
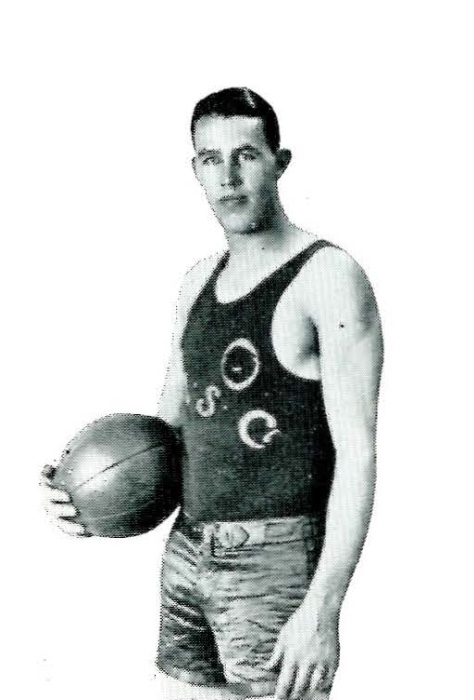
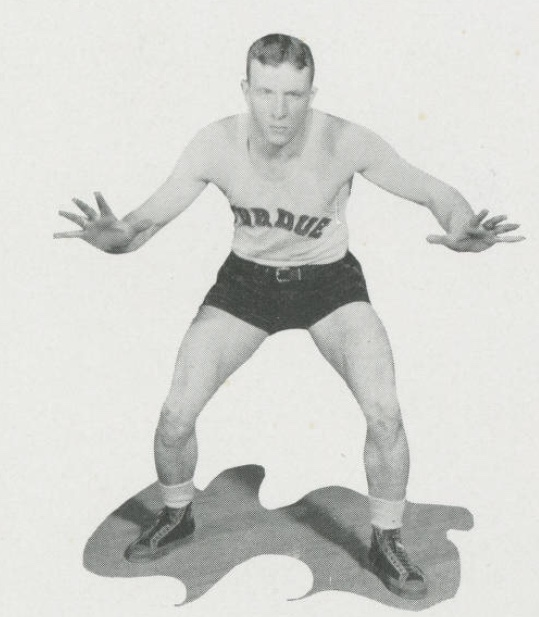
- Members of the 1930 consensus team. Clockwise from top left: Hyatt, Murphy, Thompson, Wooden, Ward. Not pictured: McCracken.
- Awarded for: 1929–30 NCAA men's basketball season

The consensus 1930 College Basketball All-American team, as determined by aggregating the results of two major All-American teams. To earn "consensus" status, a player must win honors from a majority of the following teams: the Helms Athletic Foundation, College Humor Magazine and the Christy Walsh Syndicate.

== 1930 Consensus All-America team ==
Consensus Team
Player	Class	Team
Charley Hyatt	Senior	Pittsburgh
Branch McCracken	Senior	Indiana
Stretch Murphy	Senior	Purdue
Cat Thompson	Senior	Montana State
Frank Ward	Senior	Montana State
John Wooden	Sophomore	Purdue

== Individual All-America teams ==
All-America Team
All-America Team	First team		Second team		Third team	
All-America Team	Player	School	Player	School	Player	School
Helms	Bart Carlton	Ada Teachers	No second or third teams			
Helms	Marshall Craig	Missouri	No second or third teams			
Helms	Charley Hyatt	Pittsburgh	No second or third teams			
Helms	John Lehners	Wisconsin	No second or third teams			
Helms	Paul McBrayer	Kentucky	No second or third teams			
Helms	Branch McCracken	Indiana	No second or third teams			
Helms	Stretch Murphy	Purdue	No second or third teams			
Helms	Cat Thompson	Montana State	No second or third teams			
Helms	Frank Ward	Montana State	No second or third teams			
Helms	John Wooden	Purdue	No second or third teams			
College Humor	Charley Hyatt	Pittsburgh	Ed Chmielewski	Wisconsin	Buck Grayson	Oregon State
College Humor	Mally Johnson	North Carolina State	John Krieger	Providence	Oral Hildebrand	Butler
College Humor	Charlie Murphy	Loyola (IL)	Thomas Magner	Penn	Max Kinsbrunner	St. John's
College Humor	Frank Ward	Montana State	Stretch Murphy	Purdue	Branch McCracken	Indiana
College Humor	John Wooden	Purdue	Wear Schoonover	Arkansas	Louis McGinnis	Kentucky
Christy Walsh Syndicate	Lou Bender	Columbia	No second or third teams			
Christy Walsh Syndicate	Forrest Cox	Kansas	No second or third teams			
Christy Walsh Syndicate	Bud Foster	Wisconsin	No second or third teams			
Christy Walsh Syndicate	Charley Hyatt	Pittsburgh	No second or third teams			
Christy Walsh Syndicate	Everett Katz	Syracuse	No second or third teams			
Christy Walsh Syndicate	Branch McCracken	Indiana	No second or third teams			
Christy Walsh Syndicate	Jesse Mortensen	Southern California	No second or third teams			
Christy Walsh Syndicate	Stretch Murphy	Purdue	No second or third teams			
Christy Walsh Syndicate	Edward Smith	Notre Dame	No second or third teams			
Christy Walsh Syndicate	Cat Thompson	Montana State	No second or third teams			
Christy Walsh Syndicate	Billy Werber	Duke	No second or third teams			

== See also ==
- 1929–30 NCAA men's basketball season
