= Bart Carlton =

American basketball player (1908–1993)

Personal information
- Born: February 6, 1908
- Died: October 12, 1993 (aged 85)
- Listed height: 6 ft 1 in (1.85 m)

Career information
- College: East Central (1928–1931)
- Position: Guard

Career history
- 193?–193?: DX-Oilers

Career highlights
- 2× All-American (1930, 1931); Helms National Player of the Year (1931)

Milas Barton Carlton (February 6, 1908 – October 12, 1993) was an standout American college basketball player at Ada Teachers College (later named East Central University) in Ada, Oklahoma during the early 1930s. He was a two-time All-American in 1930 and 1931 while playing with the Ada Tigers. In 1944, the Helms Athletic Foundation also retroactively named Carlton the Helms National Player of the Year for the 1930–31 season despite his having never been a consensus All-American, giving him the odd distinction as the only national player of the year since consensus voting began in the 1928–29 season who was never a consensus All-American.

After college, Carlton played for the DX-Oilers in the Amateur Athletic Union (AAU). He led them to a national championship in 1933 with teammate Chuck Hyatt and helped produce a 26–0 record.
