= George F. Veenker =

American sports coach and administrator (1894–1959)

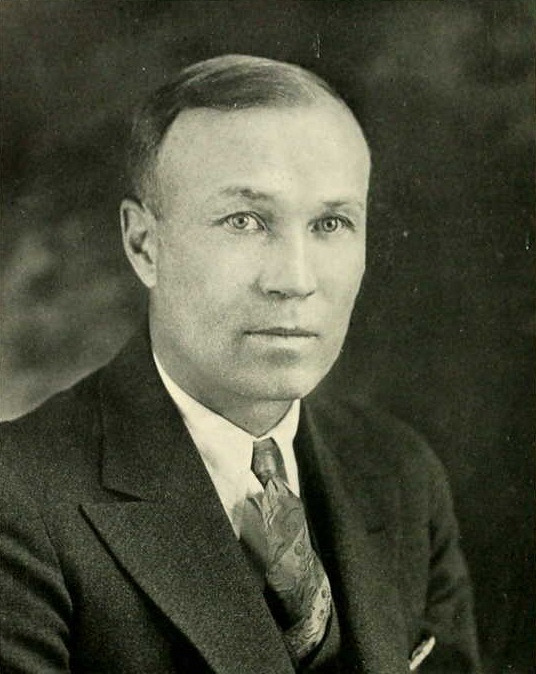

Biographical details
- Born: April 17, 1894; Ashton, Iowa, U.S.
- Died: September 8, 1959 (aged 65); Malta, Illinois, U.S.

Playing career

Football
- 1913–1916: Hope

Baseball
- 1914–1916: Hope

Track and field
- ?–1916: Hope

Coaching career (HC unless noted)

Football
- 1920–1925: Emerson HS (IN)
- 1926–1929: Michigan (assistant)
- 1931–1936: Iowa State

Basketball
- 1928–1931: Michigan

Administrative career (AD unless noted)
- 1932–1945: Iowa State

Head coaching record
- Overall: 21–22–8 (college football); 35–12 (college basketball)

Accomplishments and honors

Championships
- Basketball; 1 Big Ten (1929)

George Frederick Veenker (April 17, 1894 – September 8, 1959) was an American football and basketball coach. He was the head basketball coach at the University of Michigan from 1928 to 1931 and also served as an assistant football coach at Michigan from 1926 to 1929. From 1931 to 1936, he was the head football coach at Iowa State College (now known as Iowa State University). He was also the athletic director at Iowa State from 1933 to 1945.

== Early years ==
Veenker graduated from high school in Sioux Falls, South Dakota in 1912. He enrolled at St. Lawrence University but dropped out after one semester. He joined Phi Sigma Kappa fraternity while at St. Lawrence. The following year, he enrolled at Hope College in Holland, Michigan. While studying at Hope College, Veenker was a multi-sport athlete winning varsity letters in football, basketball, baseball, and track. He was also captain of the 1913 Hope football team. He received his degree in 1916 after three years at Hope.

== High school football coach ==
Veenker started his coaching career at the Grand Prairie Seminary in Onarga, Illinois. He subsequently coached at Batavia High School in Batavia, Illinois.

During World War I, Veenker left Batavia to enter flight school in Texas, part of the "air service" branch of the U.S. military, and became a pilot. However, the war ended before Veenker saw action.

After World War I, Veenker was hired as a high school football coach in Hammond, Indiana. After coaching the Hammond team for 18 months, Veenker was hired as the head football coach at Emerson High School in Gary, Indiana. Veenker served six years as Emerson's head football coach from 1920 to 1925. He coached a total of eight years as a high school football coach in Indiana and won Indiana state championships in six of the eight years.

== University of Michigan ==
In June 1926, Veenker was hired by the University of Michigan as an assistant football coach on Fielding H. Yost's coaching staff. Veenker was an assistant football coach at Michigan from 1926 and also served as the Wolverines' head basketball coach from 1928 to 1931. He was also an assistant track coach in his first year at Michigan.

In football, Veenker had responsibility for coaching the ends, including College Football Hall of Fame end, Bennie Oosterbaan. Veenker served under three head coaches at Michigan, Yost, Tad Wieman and Harry Kipke; all three have been inducted into the College Football Hall of Fame.

Veenker took over as head basketball coach following the death of E. J. Mather. During his three years as Michigan's basketball coach, he compiled the highest winning percentage (.745) of any basketball coach in Michigan history. In his first year, the Michigan Wolverines men's basketball team compiled a 13–3 overall (10–2, Big Ten) record to win the Big Ten conference championship. His teams finished in 3rd and 2nd (tied) place in the following two years. Veenker is the only coach in Michigan history to win a conference championship in his first season.

While coaching at Michigan, Veenker published a book on basketball, "Basketball for Coaches and Players," that reportedly became the best selling book on the subject of basketball.

== Iowa State College ==
In February 1931, Veenker accepted an offer to become the head football coach for Iowa State College (now known as Iowa State University) following the completion of the basketball season at Michigan. Veenker served as Iowa State's head football coach for six seasons, from 1931 until 1936. He also served as the school's athletic director from 1933 to 1945.

When Veenker joined Iowa State, the school's football team was coming off a winless season in 1930 and had lost 16 consecutive games dating back to October 1929. Veenker was credited with turning the Iowa State football program into a success. In his first year, the 1931 team defeated Missouri (20–0), Oklahoma (13–12), and Kansas State (7–6), compiled a 5–3 record and finished in second place in the Big Six Conference. In November 1931, the Ames Daily Tribune-Times called Veenker "a veritable miracle man of football" for taking a school where "Cyclone football morale couldn't have been lower" and turning the program around in his first season.

The highlight of Veenker's career as Iowa State's football coach was a 31–6 victory over the Iowa Hawkeyes in 1934. The game was the last meeting between the two schools for many years. After the victory over Iowa, one sports writer noted, "George Veenker deserves high praise. He went to Ames from Michigan to find a campus whose interest in football had all but died. In a few seasons what wonder George Veenker has wrought!"

On November 30, 1936, Veenker announced his resignation as the school's head football coach. As athletic director, he appointed his assistant, James J. Yeager, as the school's new head football coach. Veenker's overall record as the head football coach at Iowa State was 21 wins, 22 losses, and 8 ties.

In his 12 years as Iowa State's athletic director, Veenker led the effort to construct a golf course on the northern edge of the Iowa State campus and hired golf course architect Perry Maxwell to design the course. The golf course was completed in 1938. As athletic director, Veenker also supported the school's basketball teams led by coach Louis Menze. The Iowa State basketball team won multiple conference championships under Menze while Veenker was the athletic director.

Veenker was a member of the NCAA Football Rules Committee from 1938 to 1945. He was a member of the Rules Committee in 1941 when it instituted the free substitution rule due to a severe loss of manpower to the war effort. Veenker supported the rule, noting that smaller colleges not represented on the Rules Committee needed substitution help more than the major schools. The rule adopted in 1941 marked the beginning of the end for "iron man" football in which players remained in the game on both offense and defense due to rules limiting substitutions.

Veenker was also appointed as a professor of physical education at Iowa State in 1933 and became the "head of the Physical Education Department for Men."

In June 1945, Veenker resigned from his position as Iowa State's athletic director, effective July 1, 1945. When he announced his retirement, the Ames Daily Tribune credited Veenker with expanding the campus recreation area from 23 acres (93,000 m^{2}) to 460 acres (1.9 km^{2}), improving the athletic department's financial condition, and developing the quality of the athletic teams "to the point that championships have been coming regularly."

== Later years and death ==
After retiring from his post at Iowa State, Veenker moved to a small acreage farm near Ames, Iowa. He subsequently moved to Arkansas. In his later years, Veenker lived in Malta, Illinois, which was the hometown of his wife. He died of cancer in September 1959 at age 65. The golf course on the Iowa State campus was renamed Veenker Memorial Golf Course shortly after his death. Veenker was survived by his wife; they had no children.

Veenker was posthumously inducted into the Iowa State Athletics Hall of Fame in 2007.

== Head coaching record ==
=== College football ===
| Year | Team | Overall | Conference | Standing |
|---|---|---|---|---|
Iowa State Cyclones (Big Six Conference) (1931–1936)
| 1931 | Iowa State | 5–3 | 3–1 | 2nd |
| 1932 | Iowa State | 3–4–1 | 0–4–1 | 6th |
| 1933 | Iowa State | 3–5–1 | 1–4 | 5th |
| 1934 | Iowa State | 5–3–1 | 1–3–1 | 5th |
| 1935 | Iowa State | 2–4–3 | 1–3–1 | 5th |
| 1936 | Iowa State | 3–3–2 | 1–3–1 | 5th |
| Iowa State: | | 21–22–8 | 8–17–1 | |
| Total: | | 21–22–8 | | |

=== College basketball ===
Record table
| Season | Team | Overall | Conference | Standing | Postseason |
|---|---|---|---|---|---|
Michigan Wolverines (Big Ten Conference) (1928–1931)
| 1928–29 | Michigan | 13–3 | 10–2 | T–1st | |
| 1929–30 | Michigan | 9–5 | 6–4 | 5th | |
| 1930–31 | Michigan | 13–4 | 8–4 | T–2nd | |
| Michigan: | | 35–12 | 24–10 | | |
| Total: | | 35–12 | | | |
National champion Postseason invitational champion Conference regular season champion Conference regular season and conference tournament champion Division regular season champion Division regular season and conference tournament champion Conference tournament champion
