= 1930–31 Washington Huskies men's basketball team =

American college basketball season

1930–31 Washington Huskies men's basketball

Pacific Coast Conference Champions
- Conference: Pacific Coast Conference
- Record: 25–3 (14–2 PCC)
- Head coach: Hec Edmundson (11th season)
- Captain: Henry Swanson
- Home arena: UW Pavilion

1930–31 Pacific Coast Conference men's basketball standings
	Conf.				Overall
Team	W		L	PCT	W		L	PCT
North
Washington †	14	–	2	.875	25	–	3	.893
Washington State	10	–	6	.625	18	–	7	.720
Oregon State	9	–	7	.563	19	–	9	.679
Oregon	6	–	10	.375	12	–	10	.545
Idaho	1	–	15	.063	3	–	16	.158
South
California	6	–	3	.667	12	–	10	.545
USC	5	–	4	.556	8	–	8	.500
UCLA	4	–	5	.444	9	–	6	.600
Stanford	3	–	0	1.000	8	–	9	.471
† Conference playoff series winner

The 1930–31 Washington Huskies men's basketball team represented the University of Washington for the 1930–31 NCAA college basketball season. Led by eleventh-year head coach Hec Edmundson, the Huskies were members of the Pacific Coast Conference and played their home games on campus at the UW Pavilion in Seattle, Washington.

The Huskies were 23–2 overall in the regular season and 14–2 in conference play; first in the Northern division for a fourth consecutive year.

Washington met Southern division winner California in the Pacific Coast championship series at Seattle. The Huskies won the first game, lost the second by two, setting up a third and deciding game, which they won by twelve. It was Washington's first PCC title; they had lost the championship series in the previous three seasons.

The National Invitation Tournament (NIT) debuted in 1938, and the NCAA Tournament in 1939.

== Postseason results ==
Date time, TV	Opponent	Result	Record	Site (attendance) city, state
Pacific Coast Conference Playoff Series
Fri, March 6	California; Game One	W 41–25	24–2	UW Pavilion (8,000); Seattle, Washington
Sat, March 7	California; Game Two	L 34–36	24–3	UW Pavilion; Seattle, Washington
Mon, March 9	California; Game Three	W 42–30	25–3	UW Pavilion (8,000); Seattle, Washington
*Non-conference game. (#) Tournament seedings in parentheses. All times are in Pacific time.
