= 1930–31 Washington State Cougars men's basketball team =

American college basketball season

1930–31 Washington State Cougars men's basketball
- Conference: Pacific Coast Conference
- Record: 18–7 (10–6 PCC)
- Head coach: Jack Friel (3rd season)
- Home arena: WSC Gymnasium

1930–31 Pacific Coast Conference men's basketball standings
	Conf.				Overall
Team	W		L	PCT	W		L	PCT
North
Washington †	14	–	2	.875	25	–	3	.893
Washington State	10	–	6	.625	18	–	7	.720
Oregon State	9	–	7	.563	19	–	9	.679
Oregon	6	–	10	.375	12	–	10	.545
Idaho	1	–	15	.063	3	–	16	.158
South
California	6	–	3	.667	12	–	10	.545
USC	5	–	4	.556	8	–	8	.500
UCLA	4	–	5	.444	9	–	6	.600
Stanford	3	–	0	1.000	8	–	9	.471
† Conference playoff series winner

The 1930–31 Washington State Cougars men's basketball team represented Washington State College for the 1930–31 college basketball season. Led by third-year head coach Jack Friel, the Cougars were members of the Pacific Coast Conference and played their home games on campus at WSC Gymnasium in Pullman, Washington.

The Cougars were 18–7 overall in the regular season and 10–6 in conference play, second in the Northern division.
