= Joe Reiff =

American basketball player and referee

Personal information
- Born: June 5, 1911 Muskogee, Oklahoma, U.S.
- Died: February 9, 1988 (aged 76)
- Listed height: 6 ft 3 in (1.91 m)

Career information
- High school: Crane (Chicago, Illinois)
- College: Northwestern (1930–1933)
- Position: Center
- Number: 6

Career highlights
- 2× Consensus All-American (1931, 1933); Third-team All-American – College Humor (1932); Helms Foundation national champion (1931); AAU All-American (1933)

Joseph Reiff (June 5, 1911 – February 9, 1988) was an American basketball player and referee. He was a three-time All-American center at Northwestern University.

Reiff, a 6'3 (1.91 m) center from Crane Technical High School in Chicago, chose to attend nearby Northwestern University and play for Hall of Fame coach Dutch Lonborg. Reiff led the Wildcats to a Western Conference championship in his sophomore year. Reiff led the league in scoring with a 10.0 average. Northwestern finished 13-1 (11-1 in league play) and would later be retroactively named 1931 National Champions by the Helms Athletic Foundation and Reiff was named a consensus All-American.

In his junior year, Reiff finished second in the conference in scoring to Purdue senior John Wooden. In his senior year, Reiff again led Northwestern to a conference title and led the league in scoring for a second time at 14.0 points per game. He was once again named a consensus All-American

After graduating from Northwestern, Reiff played for Rosenberg-Avery of Chicago in the Amateur Athletic Union (AAU) and was named to the All-AAU team. He then became a basketball referee in the Western Conference from 1937-1947.

Joe Reiff was a charter inductee into the Northwestern athletics Hall of Fame, elected in 1984.
