= 1930–31 Cincinnati Bearcats men's basketball team =

American college basketball season

1930–31 Cincinnati Bearcats men's basketball
- Conference: Buckeye Athletic Association
- Record: 2–15 (2–6 BAA)
- Head coach: Frank Rice (3rd season)
- Captain: Ray Barsdale
- Home arena: Schmidlapp Gymnasium

The 1930–31 Cincinnati Bearcats men's basketball team represented the University of Cincinnati during the 1930–31 NCAA men's basketball season. The head coach was Frank Rice, who was coached his third season with the Bearcats. The team finished with an overall record of 2–15.

== Schedule ==
Date time, TV	Opponent	Result	Record	Site city, state
December 5	at Michigan St.	L 8–22	0–1	Demonstration Hall; East Lansing, MI
December 6	at Detroit	L 25–34	0–2	Detroit, MI
December 12	at Butler	L 12–36	0–3	Butler Fieldhouse; Indianapolis, IN
December 19	DePauw	L 22–30	0–4	Schmidlapp Gymnasium; Cincinnati, OH
January 2	Cornell	L 16–20	0–5	Schmidlapp Gymnasium; Cincinnati, OH
January 3	Brigham Young	L 27–41	0–6	Schmidlapp Gymnasium; Cincinnati, OH
January 10	Denison	W 25–15	1–6	Schmidlapp Gymnasium; Cincinnati, OH
January 14	at Muskingum	L 24–39	1–7	New Concord, OH
January 17	Ohio Wesleyan	L 25–27	1–8	Schmidlapp Gymnasium; Cincinnati, OH
January 24	at Miami (OH)	W 24–18	2–8	Oxford, OH
January 31	Ohio	L 22–28	2–9	Schmidlapp Gymnasium; Cincinnati, OH
February 2	Detroit	L 20–37	2–10	Schmidlapp Gymnasium; Cincinnati, OH
February 7	at DePauw	L 13–28	2–11	Greencastle, IN
February 11	at Denison	L 24–42	2–12	Granville, OH
February 14	at Ohio Wesleyan	L 22–37	2–13	Delaware, OH
February 18	at Ohio	L 14–32	2–14	Men's Gymnasium; Athens, OH
February 21	Miami (OH)	L 19–43	2–15	Schmidlapp Gymnasium; Cincinnati, OH
*Non-conference game. (#) Tournament seedings in parentheses.
