= 1931 NCAA Men's Basketball All-Americans =

- Awarded for: 1930–31 NCAA men's basketball season

The consensus 1931 College Basketball All-American team, as determined by aggregating the results of two major All-American teams. To earn "consensus" status, a player must win honors from a majority of the following teams: the Helms Athletic Foundation and College Humor Magazine.

== 1931 Consensus All-America team ==
Consensus Team
Player	Class	Team
Wes Fesler	Senior	Ohio State
George Gregory	Senior	Columbia
Joe Reiff	Sophomore	Northwestern
Elwood Romney	Sophomore	Brigham Young
John Wooden	Junior	Purdue

== Individual All-America teams ==
All-America Team
All-America Team	First team		Second team		Third team	
All-America Team	Player	School	Player	School	Player	School
Helms	Boze Berger	Maryland	No second or third teams			
Helms	Ralph Cairney	Washington	No second or third teams			
Helms	Bart Carlton	Ada Teachers	No second or third teams			
Helms	Wes Fesler	Ohio State	No second or third teams			
Helms	George Gregory	Columbia	No second or third teams			
Helms	Dick Linthicum	UCLA	No second or third teams			
Helms	Joe Reiff	Northwestern	No second or third teams			
Helms	Elwood Romney	Brigham Young	No second or third teams			
Helms	Carey Spicer	Kentucky	No second or third teams			
Helms	John Wooden	Purdue	No second or third teams			
College Humor	Max Collings	Missouri	Web Caldwell	Southern California	Keith Ario	Montana State
College Humor	Lindy Hood	Alabama	Wes Fesler	Ohio State	Louis Hayman	Syracuse
College Humor	Max Posnak	St. John's	George Gregory	Columbia	Don Maclay	Nebraska
College Humor	Joe Reiff	Northwestern	John Krieger	Providence	Elwood Romney	Brigham Young
College Humor	John Wooden	Purdue	Ray Stecker	Army	James Sexton	Arkansas

== See also ==
- 1930–31 NCAA men's basketball season
