= 1930–31 Niagara Purple Eagles men's basketball team =

American college basketball season

1930–31 Niagara Purple Eagles men's basketball
- Conference: Independent
- Record: 12–10
- Head coach: William McCarthy (4th season)

The 1930–31 Niagara Purple Eagles men's basketball team represented Niagara University during the 1930–31 NCAA college men's basketball season. The head coach was William McCarthy, coaching his fourth season with the Purple Eagles.

== Schedule ==
Date time, TV	Opponent	Result	Record	Site city, state
	Tuscarora Indians	W 29–20	1–0	Lewiston, NY
	Cornell	L 32–34	1–1	Lewiston, NY
	Buffalo State	W 43–27	2–1	Lewiston, NY
	Rochester	W 34–33	3–1	Lewiston, NY
1/05/1931	at St. John's	L 23–44	3–2	Queens, NY
	Buffalo	L 27–42	3–3	Lewiston, NY
1/25/1931	St. Bonaventure	W 26–24	4–3	Lewiston, NY
	Rochester	W 30–24	5–3	Lewiston, NY
	Hobart	W 30–13	6–3	Lewiston, NY
	Fordham	L 18–34	6–4	Lewiston, NY
	Manhattan	L 17–35	6–5	Lewiston, NY
	Brooklyn K of C	W 22–21	7–5	Lewiston, NY
	Rochester	W 30–24	8–5	Lewiston, NY
	Clarkson Tech	W 36–21	9–5	Lewiston, NY
	St. Lawrence	L 23–28	9–6	Lewiston, NY
	Colgate	L 24–35	9–7	Lewiston, NY
	Clarkson Tech	W 35–34	10–7	Lewiston, NY
	St. Lawrence	W 26–24	11–7	Lewiston, NY
	Buffalo	L 43–46	11–8	Lewiston, NY
	Alfred	W 31–20	12–8	Lewiston, NY
	Alfred	L 26–38	12–9	Lewiston, NY
3/08/1931	at St. Bonaventure	L 24–30	12–10	Butler Gym; Olean, NY
*Non-conference game. (#) Tournament seedings in parentheses.
