= 1930–31 Idaho Vandals men's basketball team =

American college basketball season

1930–31 Idaho Vandals men's basketball
- Conference: Pacific Coast Conference
- Record: 4–19 (1–15 PCC)
- Head coach: Rich Fox (4th season)
- Assistant coach: Glenn Jacoby
- Home arena: Memorial Gymnasium

1930–31 Pacific Coast Conference men's basketball standings
	Conf.				Overall
Team	W		L	PCT	W		L	PCT
North
Washington †	14	–	2	.875	25	–	3	.893
Washington State	10	–	6	.625	18	–	7	.720
Oregon State	9	–	7	.563	19	–	9	.679
Oregon	6	–	10	.375	12	–	10	.545
Idaho	1	–	15	.063	3	–	16	.158
South
California	6	–	3	.667	12	–	10	.545
USC	5	–	4	.556	8	–	8	.500
UCLA	4	–	5	.444	9	–	6	.600
Stanford	3	–	0	1.000	8	–	9	.471
† Conference playoff series winner

The 1930–31 Idaho Vandals men's basketball team represented the University of Idaho during the 1930–31 NCAA college basketball season. Members of the Pacific Coast Conference, the Vandals were led by fourth-year head coach Rich Fox and played their home games on campus at Memorial Gymnasium in Moscow, Idaho.

The Vandals were 4–19 overall and 1–15 in conference play.
