= John J. Gallagher (coach) =

American football and basketball player and coach (1904–1982)

Biographical details
- Born: July 16, 1904; Brooklyn, New York, U.S.
- Died: February 7, 1982 (aged 77); Niagara Falls, New York, U.S.

Playing career

Football
- 1924–1926: St. John's

Basketball
- 1924–1927: St. John's

Coaching career (HC unless noted)

Football
- 1936: Niagara

Basketball
- 1931–1943: Niagara
- 1946–1965: Niagara

Head coaching record
- Overall: 3–5 (football); 486–262 (basketball)

John Joseph "Taps" Gallagher (July 16, 1904 – February 7, 1982) was an American football and basketball player and coach. He served as the head football coach at Niagara University in 1936. However, his greatest contributions were made as the head basketball coach at Niagara from 1931 to 1943 and again from 1946 to 1965, compiling a record of 486–262.

Gallagher died on February 7, 1982, in Niagara Falls, New York.

== Head coaching record ==
=== Football ===
Year	Team	Overall	Conference	Standing	Bowl/playoffs
Niagara Purple Eagles (Western New York Little Three Conference) (1936)
1936	Niagara	3–5	0–2	3rd	
Niagara:		3–5	0–2		
Total:		3–5			
