= Elwood Romney =

American basketball player and coach

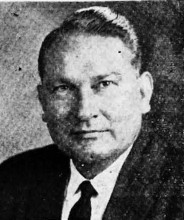
- Romney c. 1959

Personal information
- Born: May 28, 1911 Salt Lake City, Utah
- Died: August 24, 1970 (aged 59) Provo, Utah

Career information
- High school: Dixie (St. George, Utah)
- College: BYU (1929–1933)
- Position: Forward

Career highlights
- Consensus All-American (1931); Helms Foundation All-American (1932); 2x All-Rocky Mountain (1931, 1932)

Elwood Snow "Woody" Romney (May 28, 1911 – August 24, 1970) was an American basketball player and coach. He was an All-American at Brigham Young University (BYU) and later played semi-professionally. After his playing days, Romney coached at the college level and worked in other high-profile sports endeavors.

Romney, a forward from St. George, Utah, starred at Dixie High School and played collegiately at Brigham Young from 1929 to 1933. Romney led the Cougars to a pair of Rocky Mountain Conference titles. He was named a consensus All-American in 1931 and again made the Helms Athletic Foundation All-America team in 1932. Romney scored 1,150 points in his BYU career.

After the completion of his college career, Romney played semi-professional basketball with the Denver Athletic Club for two seasons. He then coached collegiately, first at Western State College for the 1935–36 season (13–7 record), then at the Colorado School of Mines from 1936 to 1939 (9–45 record). Romney was hired at Mines to also work in multiple sports, and during his tenure at Mines Romney also coached freshman football and was credited with creating a great deal of interest in intramural sports to where 300 students were taking part by the time he departed in 1939. While living at Golden, Colorado Romney also sold automobiles and spearheaded the revival of the Golden Plunge, Golden's community swimming pool, formulating a business plan and leading the successful community effort to purchase and reopen it on July 4, 1938. He owned and ran it successfully until selling it in October 1941.

After leaving coaching, Elwood Romney remained active in sports in Colorado. He was a key figure in founding the Western League, a minor-league baseball circuit, and served as league president. He also owned the Denver Bears franchise.

In personal life, Romney was married to Ruth Hafen on June 26, 1928. They had three children: Jerry Elwood Romney, Janice Ruth Romney, and Jean Romney. Elwood Romney was the son of Erastus Snow Romney and Roxie Maria Stowell and grandson of Miles Park Romney and Annie Marie Woodbury. By this relation Elwood was a first cousin of George W. Romney and is ancestral cousin of his son Mitt Romney.

Elwood Romney was inducted into the BYU Athletics Hall of Fame, the Helms Athletic Foundation Hall of Fame and the Utah Sports Hall of Fame. He died on August 24, 1970.
