= 1930–31 Buffalo Bisons men's basketball team =

American college basketball season

1930–31 Buffalo Bulls men's basketball
- Conference: Independent
- Record: 15–0
- Head coach: Art Powell (16th season)

The 1930–31 Buffalo Bisons men's basketball team represented the University of Buffalo during the 1930–31 NCAA college men's basketball season. The head coach was Art Powell, coaching his sixteenth season with the Bisons.

== Schedule ==
Date time, TV	Opponent	Result	Record	Site city, state
	Buffalo State	W 54–19	1–0	Buffalo, NY
	Toronto	W 44–16	2–0	Buffalo, NY
	Cornell	W 49–37	3–0	Buffalo, NY
	Carnegie Tech	W 42–31	4–0	Buffalo, NY
	at Hamilton	W 42–18	5–0	Hamilton, NY
	at St. Lawrence	W 46–30	6–0	Canton, NY
	at Clarkson	W 52–33	7–0	
	Niagara	W 42–27	8–0	Buffalo, NY
	at Rochester	W 48–25	9–0	Rochester, NY
	Hobart	W 54–11	10–0	Buffalo, NY
	Clarkson	W 47–25	11–0	Buffalo, NY
	St. Lawrence	W 31–28	12–0	Buffalo, NY
	at Niagara	W 46–43	13–0	Lewiston, NY
	Alfred	W 44–32	14–0	Buffalo, NY
	Rochester	W 59–16	15–0	Buffalo, NY
*Non-conference game. (#) Tournament seedings in parentheses.
