= 1930–31 Michigan Wolverines men's basketball team =

American college basketball season

1930–31 Michigan Wolverines men's basketball
- Conference: Big Ten Conference
- Record: 13–4 (8–4 Big Ten)
- Head coach: George Veenker
- Captain: Joe Downing
- Home arena: Yost Field House

1930–31 Big Ten Conference men's basketball standings
	Conf.				Overall
Team	W		L	PCT	W		L	PCT
Northwestern	11	–	1	.917	16	–	1	.941
Michigan	8	–	4	.667	13	–	4	.765
Minnesota	8	–	4	.667	13	–	4	.765
Purdue	8	–	4	.667	12	–	5	.706
Illinois	7	–	5	.583	12	–	5	.706
Indiana	5	–	7	.417	9	–	8	.529
Chicago	4	–	8	.333	8	–	9	.471
Wisconsin	4	–	8	.333	8	–	9	.471
Ohio State	3	–	9	.250	4	–	13	.235
Iowa	2	–	10	.167	5	–	12	.294

The 1930–31 Michigan Wolverines men's basketball team represented the University of Michigan in intercollegiate basketball during the 1930–31 season. The team compiled a 13–4 record, and 8–4 against Big Ten Conference opponents. The team finished in a tie for second place in the Big Ten. Joe Downing was the team captain, and Norman Daniels was the team's leading scorer with 152 points in 17 games for an average of 8.9 points per game.

== Scoring statistics ==
Player	Games	Field goals	Free throws	Points	Points per game
Norman Daniels	17	58	36	152	8.9
Henry Weiss	17	37	20	94	5.5
DeForest Eveland	15	32	18	82	5.5
Raymond Altenhof	17	28	24	80	4.7
Robert Petrie	15	17	6	40	2.7
Ivan Williamson	16	15	6	36	2.3
Alex Shaw	12	5	7	17	1.4
Joe Downing	5	4	0	8	1.6
Roy Hudson	7	3	0	6	0.9
James Garner	8	2	1	5	0.6
Estel Tessmer	7	1	1	2	0.4
Totals	17	203	119	525	30.9

== Coaching staff ==
- George Veenker - coach
- Fielding H. Yost - athletic director
