= Hartmann Center for the Performing Arts =

Building at Bradley University in Peoria, Illinois

- Bradley Institute Gymnasium (1909-1958); Hewitt Gymnasium (1958-1975)
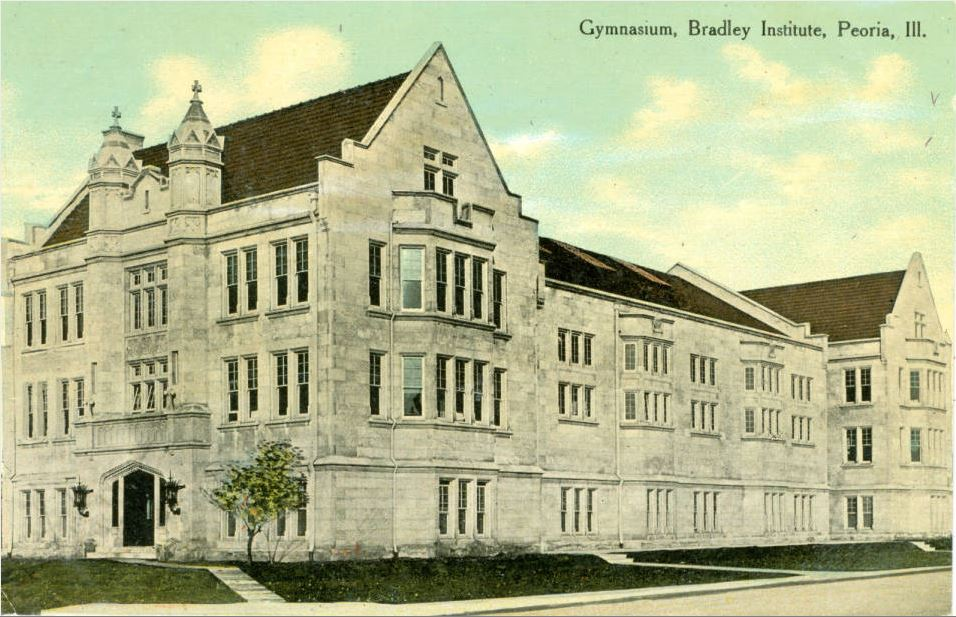
- Bradley Institute Gymnasium c. 1909
- Address: 1423 St. James Street; Peoria, Illinois 61606; United States
- Owner: Bradley University
- Capacity: 375 total seats (two theatres)
- Type: Meyers-Jacobs Theatre; Laboratory Theatre; Hartmann Center Gallery
- Public transit: CityLink

Construction
- Opened: 1909 (Gymnasium, Bradley Institute, Peoria, IL)
- Reopened: 1978 (Hartmann Center)

Website
- Bradley.edu

The Bradley University Department of Theatre Arts is exclusively housed in the Hartmann Center for the Performing Arts. Named for Jack and Mary Hartmann, two benefactors Bradley University, the Hartmann Center houses the Meyer Jacobs Theatre, a 300-seat thrust configuration performance space, and the Laboratory Theatre, a 75-seat black box studio/classroom.

== Original construction ==
Constructed in 1908 as the Bradley Institute Gymnasium, the University’s gymnasium, the facility was a lasting gift from Lydia Moss Bradley. Additionally it was one of the three original campus structures constructed at a cost of $75,000. The gymnasium was completed in the fall of 1909, and it was regarded the finest facility of its kind in Illinois outside of Chicago. When it opened, it was the nation’s third largest gymnasium. There were bowling alleys, pool tables, and an indoor track above the main floor. Designed for the use of 600 students, the gym housed a swimming pool on the ground floor that today is part of the orchestra pit, a men’s gym with a 1200-seat basketball court, a woman’s gym, and a third floor social hall. It was home to the Bradley Braves during the team's formative years and would remain as the primary home court until the team moved to Robertson Memorial Field House in 1949. The gym did not have an official name until 1958 when former professor and Vice President emeritus, Cecil M. Hewitt passed away. Hewitt's name was attached to the nearly 50-year-old structure giving it the distinction of Hewitt Hall.

== Redesign ==
Seventy years after its initial opening, in 1978, after a rich history of intercollegiate sporting events and conference tournaments, not to mention two world wars where the facility served as a barracks and training center, Hewitt Hall was converted into the Hartmann Center for the Performing Arts. The nearly $1.7 million costs were primarily covered by contributions from H.W. "Jack" and Mary C. Hartmann, who donated $500,000, and Caterpillar Inc., $300,000. Today the Hartmann Center is home to Meyer-Jacobs Theatre, Laboratory Theatre, and Hartmann Center Gallery as well as offices for the Department of Theatre Arts.

== Ghosts ==
The Hartmann Center is known for having at least three different ghosts: a young boy, a former theatre patron, and a "Lady in White". According to legend, a young boy drowned in the pool that would be in the same location as the present-day orchestra pit. The boy is said to be heard sobbing beneath the floorboards of the pit and scratching against the wood as he tries to get out of the water. The "Lady in White" is a former opera singer who roams the backstage of the Meyer-Jacobs Theatre. She is observed to be watching over actors and productions to ensure that no one is hurt. The final ghost of the theater is the so-called "Brown Man". This ghost is known to be a former theater patron who regularly attended performances, dressed in his characteristic dark brown suit. The "Brown Man" would sit in the back of the theater and keep an eye out for those in attendance to pay attention to the show. Following his death, many sitting the back of the theater have reported seeing the apparition of a man in a brown suit. He appears after the curtain has gone up and seems to be watching the show.
