= List of Notre Dame Fighting Irish men's basketball seasons =

This is a list of seasons completed by the Notre Dame Fighting Irish men's college basketball team.

== Seasons ==
Statistics overview
Season	Coach	Overall	Conference	Standing	Postseason
(Independent) (1896–1897)
1896–97	No coach	2–1			
Frank E. Hering (Independent) (1897–1898)
1897–98	Frank Hering	1–2			
Frank Hering:		1–2			
J. Fred Powers (Independent) (1898–1899)
1898–99	J. Fred Powers	2–0			
J. Fred Powers:		2–0			
Bertram Maris (Independent) (1907–1913)
1907–08	Bertram Maris	12–4			
1908–09	Bertram Maris	33–7			
1909–10	Bertram Maris	10–4			
1910–11	Bertram Maris	7–3			
1911–12	Bertram Maris	16–2			
Bertram Maris:		78–20			
Bill Nelson (Independent) (1912–1913)
1912–13	Bill Nelson	13–2			
Bill Nelson:		13–2			
Jesse Harper (Independent) (1913–1919)
1913–14	Jesse Harper	11–5			
1914–15	Jesse Harper	14–3			
1915–16	Jesse Harper	9–3			
1916–17	Jesse Harper	8–5			
1917–18	Jesse Harper	2–4			
1918–19	Jesse Harper	2–10			
Jesse Harper:		46–30			
Gus Dorais (Independent) (1919–1920)
1919–20	Gus Dorais	5–13			
Gus Dorais:		5–13			
Walter Halas (Independent) (1920–1923)
1920–21	Walter Halas	9–14			
1921–22	Walter Halas	6–13			
1922–23	Walter Halas	10–12			
Walter Halas:		25–39			
George Keogan (Independent) (1923–1943)
1923–24	George Keogan	15–8			
1924–25	George Keogan	11–11			
1925–26	George Keogan	19–1			
1926–27	George Keogan	19–1			Helms National Champion
1927–28	George Keogan	18–4			
1928–29	George Keogan	15–5			
1929–30	George Keogan	14–6			
1930–31	George Keogan	12–8			
1931–32	George Keogan	18–2			
1932–33	George Keogan	16–6			
1933–34	George Keogan	20–4			
1934–35	George Keogan	13–9			
1935–36	George Keogan	22–2–1			Helms National Champion
1936–37	George Keogan	20–3			
1937–38	George Keogan	20–3			
1938–39	George Keogan	15–6			
1939–40	George Keogan	15–6			
1940–41	George Keogan	17–5			
1941–42	George Keogan	16–6			
1942–43	George Keogan; Moose Krause	13–1; 5–1			
George Keogan:		328–97–1			
Moose Krause (Independent) (1943–1944)
1943–44	Moose Krause	9–10			
Moose Krause:		14–11			
Clem Crowe (Independent) (1944–1945)
1944–45	Clem Crowe	15–5			
Clem Crowe:		15–5			
Elmer Ripley (Independent) (1945–1946)
1945–46	Elmer Ripley	17–4			
Elmer Ripley:		17–4			
Moose Krause (Independent) (1946–1951)
1946–47	Moose Krause	20–4			
1947–48	Moose Krause	17–7			
1948–49	Moose Krause	17–7			
1949–50	Moose Krause	15–9			
1950–51	Moose Krause	13–11			
Moose Krause:		82–38			
John Jordan (Independent) (1951–1964)
1951–52	John Jordan	16–10			
1952–53	John Jordan	19–5			NCAA Elite Eight
1953–54	John Jordan	22–3			NCAA Elite Eight
1954–55	John Jordan	14–10			
1955–56	John Jordan	9–15			
1956–57	John Jordan	20–8			NCAA University Division Sweet Sixteen
1957–58	John Jordan	24–5			NCAA University Division Elite Eight
1958–59	John Jordan	12–13			
1959–60	John Jordan	17–9			NCAA University Division first round
1960–61	John Jordan	12–14			
1961–62	John Jordan	7–16			
1962–63	John Jordan	17–9			NCAA University Division first round
1963–64	John Jordan	10–14			
John Jordan:		199–131			
Johnny Dee (Independent) (1964–1971)
1964–65	Johnny Dee	15–12			NCAA University Division first round
1965–66	Johnny Dee	5–21			
1966–67	Johnny Dee	14–14			
1967–68	Johnny Dee	21–9			NIT Third Place
1968–69	Johnny Dee	20–7			NCAA University Division first round
1969–70	Johnny Dee	21–8			NCAA University Division Sweet Sixteen
1970–71	Johnny Dee	20–9			NCAA University Division Sweet Sixteen
Johnny Dee:		116–80			
Digger Phelps (Independent) (1971–1991)
1971–72	Digger Phelps	6–20			
1972–73	Digger Phelps	18–12			NIT Runner-up
1973–74	Digger Phelps	26–3			NCAA Division I Sweet Sixteen
1974–75	Digger Phelps	19–10			NCAA Division I Sweet Sixteen
1975–76	Digger Phelps	23–6			NCAA Division I Sweet Sixteen
1976–77	Digger Phelps	22–7			NCAA Division I Sweet Sixteen
1977–78	Digger Phelps	23–8			NCAA Division I Final Four
1978–79	Digger Phelps	24–6			NCAA Division I Elite Eight
1979–80	Digger Phelps	22–6			NCAA Division I second round
1980–81	Digger Phelps	23–6			NCAA Division I Sweet Sixteen
1981–82	Digger Phelps	10–17			
1982–83	Digger Phelps	19–10			NIT first round
1983–84	Digger Phelps	21–12			NIT Runner-up
1984–85	Digger Phelps	21–9			NCAA Division I second round
1985–86	Digger Phelps	23–6			NCAA Division I first round
1986–87	Digger Phelps	24–8			NCAA Division I Sweet Sixteen
1987–88	Digger Phelps	20–9			NCAA Division I first round
1988–89	Digger Phelps	21–9			NCAA Division I second round
1989–90	Digger Phelps	16–13			NCAA Division I first round
1990–91	Digger Phelps	12–20			
Digger Phelps:		393–197			
John MacLeod (Independent) (1991–1995)
1991–92	John MacLeod	18–15			NIT Runner-up
1992–93	John MacLeod	9–18			
1993–94	John MacLeod	12–17			
1994–95	John MacLeod	15–12			
John MacLeod (Big East) (1995–1999)
1995–96	John MacLeod	9–18	4–14	6th (BE 6)	
1996–97	John MacLeod	16–14	8–10	T–4th (BE 6)	NIT Quarterfinal
1997–98	John MacLeod	13–14	7–11	5th (BE 6)	
1998–99	John MacLeod	14–16	8–10	T–8th	
John MacLeod:		106–124	27–45		
Matt Doherty (Big East) (1999–2000)
1999–00	Matt Doherty	22–15	8–8	T–6th	NIT Runner-up
Matt Doherty:		22–15	8–8		
Mike Brey (Big East) (2000–2013)
2000–01	Mike Brey	20–10	11–5	1st (West)	NCAA Division I second round
2001–02	Mike Brey	22–11	10–6	2nd (West)	NCAA Division I second round
2002–03	Mike Brey	24–10	10–6	T–3rd (West)	NCAA Division I Sweet Sixteen
2003–04	Mike Brey	19–13	9–7	7th	NIT Quarterfinal
2004–05	Mike Brey	17–12	9–7	6th	NIT first round
2005–06	Mike Brey	16–14	6–10	T–11th	NIT second round
2006–07	Mike Brey	24–8	11–5	4th	NCAA Division I first round
2007–08	Mike Brey	25–8	14–4	T–2nd	NCAA Division I second round
2008–09	Mike Brey	21–15	8–10	T–9th	NIT Semifinal
2009–10	Mike Brey	23–12	10–8	T–7th	NCAA Division I first round
2010–11	Mike Brey	27–7	14–4	2nd	NCAA Division I second round
2011–12	Mike Brey	22–12	13–5	3rd	NCAA Division I first round
2012–13	Mike Brey	25–10	11–7	T–5th	NCAA Division I first round
Mike Brey (ACC) (2013–2023)
2013-14	Mike Brey	15–17	6–12	T–12th	
2014–15	Mike Brey	32–6	14–4	3rd	NCAA Division I Elite Eight
2015–16	Mike Brey	24–12	11–7	T–5th	NCAA Division I Elite Eight
2016–17	Mike Brey	26–10	12–6	T–2nd	NCAA Division I second round
2017–18	Mike Brey	21–15	8–10	10th	NIT second round
2018–19	Mike Brey	14–19	3–15	15th	
2019–20	Mike Brey	20–12	10–10	T–6th	No postseason held
2020–21	Mike Brey	11–15	7–11	11th	
2021–22	Mike Brey	24–11	15–5	T–2nd	NCAA Division I Round of 32
2022–23	Mike Brey	11–21	3–17	14th	
Brey:		483–280	225–181		
Micah Shrewsberry (ACC) (2023–present)
2023–24	Micah Shrewsberry	13–20	7–13	T–12th	
2024–25	Micah Shrewsberry	15–18	8–12	T–9th	
2025–26	Micah Shrewsberry	13–18	4–14	T–16th	
Shrewsberry:		41–56	19–39		
Total:		1,989–1,144–1			
National champion Postseason invitational champion Conference regular season champion Conference regular season and conference tournament champion Division regular season champion Division regular season and conference tournament champion Conference tournament champion
