= Huff Hall =

Multi-purpose arena in Champaign, Illinois, United States

Coordinates: 40.103540°N 88.232811°W

George Huff Hall
- Huff Hall
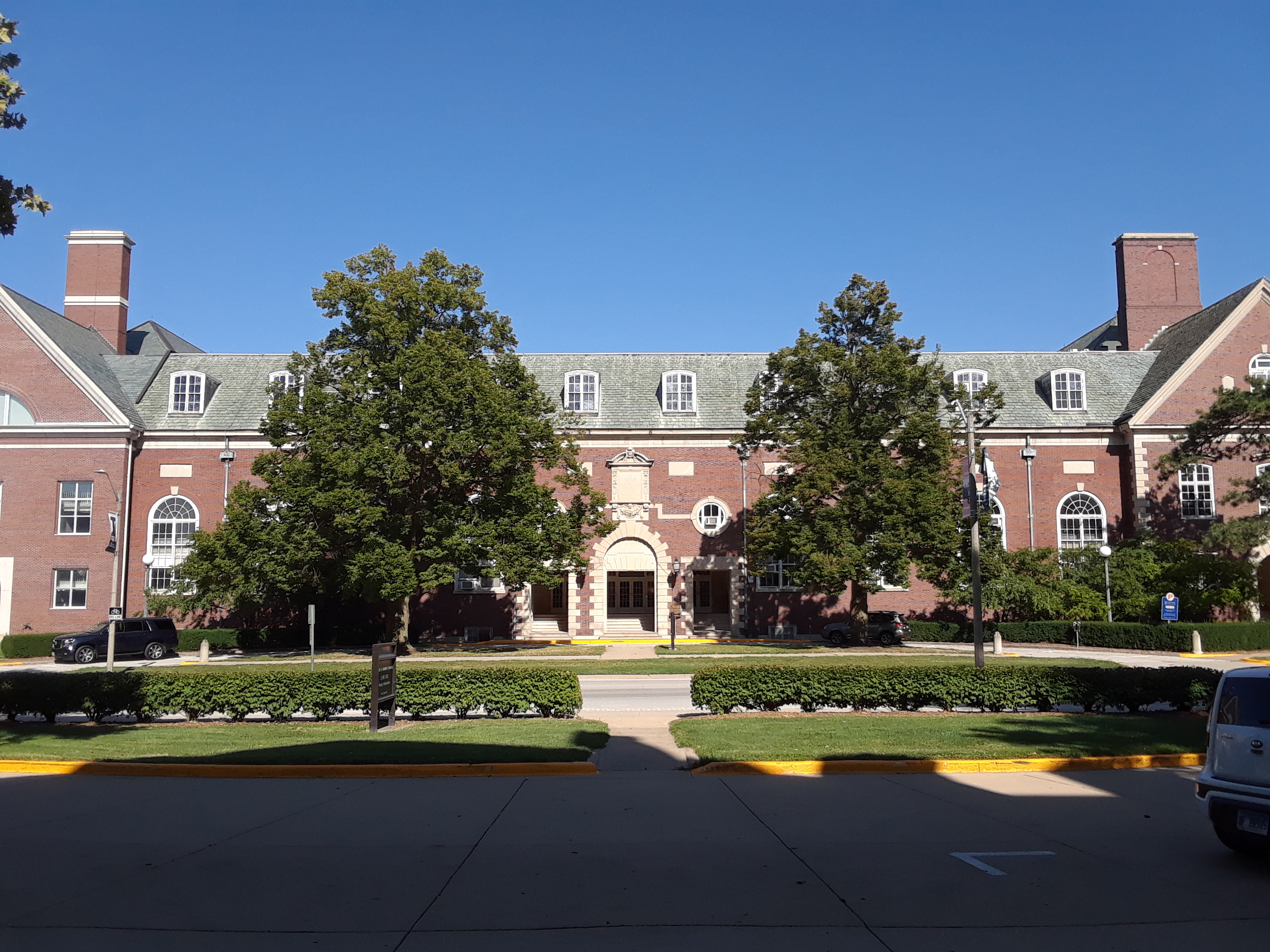
- Huff Hall in 2020
- Interactive map of George Huff Hall
- Former names: New Gymnasium (1925-1937); Huff Gym (1937–1992)
- Location: 1206 S 4th St; Champaign, IL 61820
- Owner: University of Illinois at Urbana–Champaign
- Capacity: Volleyball, Wrestling: 4,050; Gymnastics: 3,800
- Surface: Hardwood Courts
- Record attendance: Volleyball: 4,536
- Public transit: Fourth and Gregory; 1 Yellow, 8 Bronze, 22 Illini

Construction
- Groundbreaking: June 7, 1924
- Opened: 1925
- Renovated: 1992, 2002
- Expanded: 2011
- Cost: $772,000
- Architects: James M. White; Charles A. Platt
- General contractor: English Brothers Co.

Tenants
- Illinois Fighting Illini men's basketball (1925–63); Illinois Fighting Illini women's volleyball (1990–present); Illinois Fighting Illini men's gymnastics Illinois Fighting Illini women's gymnastics Illinois Fighting Illini wrestling

Huff Hall is a 4,050-seat multi-purpose arena in Champaign, Illinois, United States. The arena opened in 1925 and was known as Huff Gymnasium until the 1990s. It is named after George Huff, who was the school's athletic director from 1895 to 1935.

Huff Hall is home to the University of Illinois Fighting Illini volleyball and wrestling teams. Prior to the opening of Assembly Hall in 1963, it was home to the basketball team as well.

Currently Huff Hall is used for a variety of sporting events, including men's and women's gymnastics, men's wrestling, and women's volleyball. At each athletic event banners are hung of past Illini heroes to remind the crowd of the rich tradition that Illini athletics have had.

Every March from 1926 to 1962, Huff Gymnasium played host to the state finals of the Illinois High School Association boys' basketball tournament.

Huff Hall also served as the home of the women's basketball team. Beginning in the 1970s and continuing through the mid-1990s, the team once again used Huff Hall for home games, as it struggled to fill up the Assembly Hall. Since 1997 the team has used the Assembly Hall exclusively.

From 1927 to 2002 Huff Hall was also home to a 25-yard swimming pool which served as the home of the University of Illinois at Urbana–Champaign Underwater Hockey club and the University of Illinois Water Polo Club. The pool had a consistent depth of 8 ft. which made it ideal for these activities.

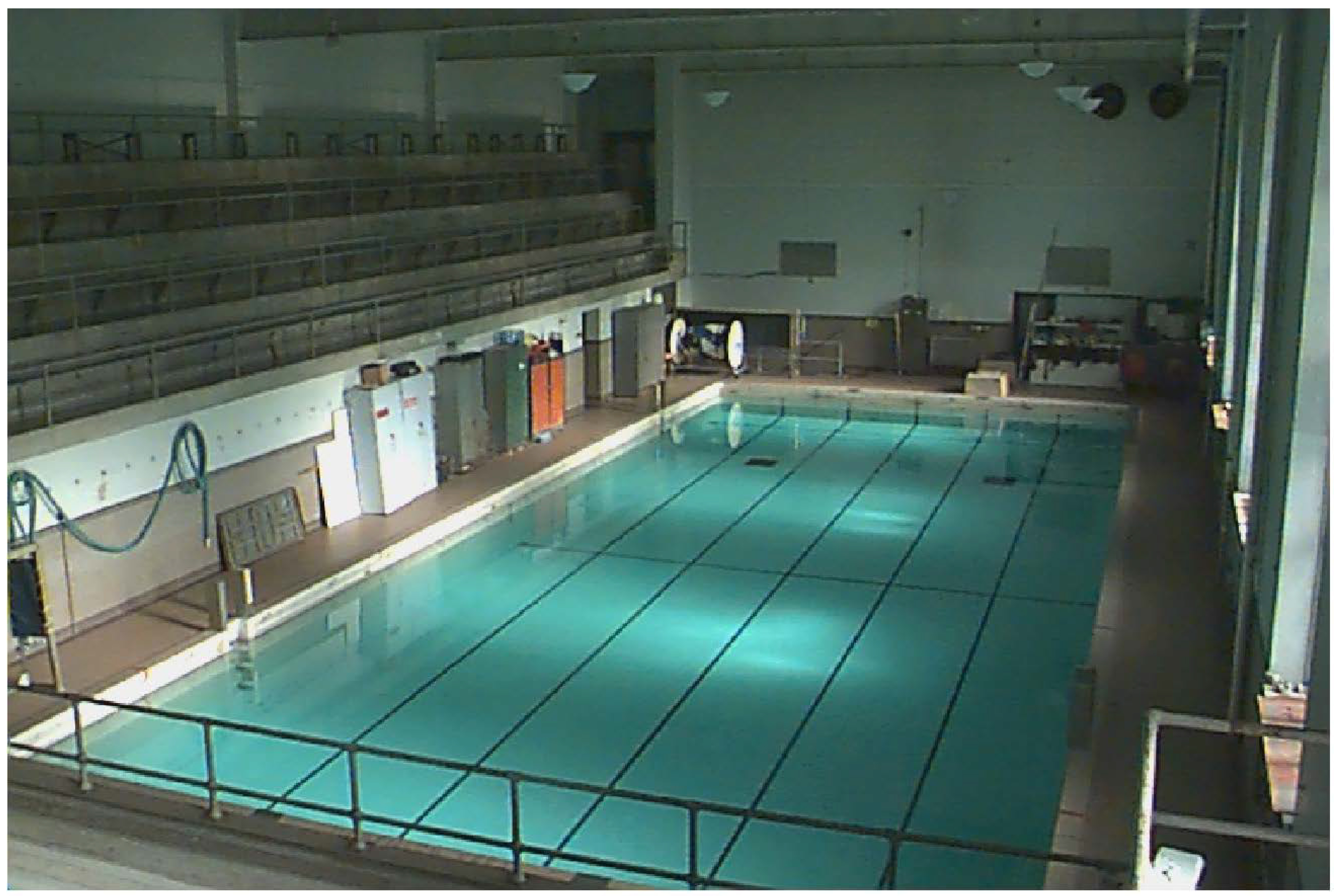
Huff Hall Swimming Pool, circa 2001.

In addition to hosting athletic events, Huff Hall is also the home of the College of Applied Health Sciences.

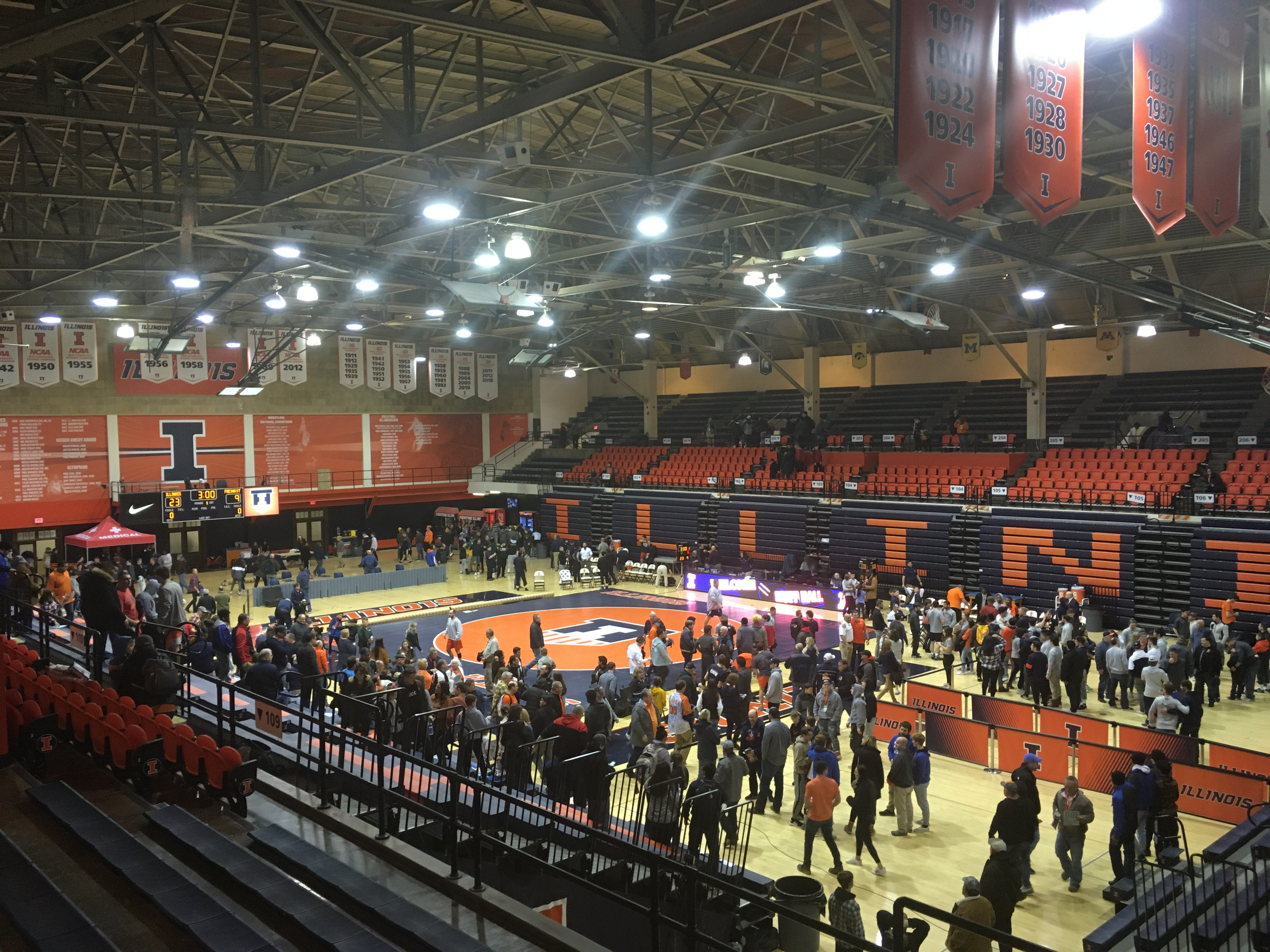
Huff Hall following the last wrestling meet of the 2019–2020 season.

== History ==
Originally called the "New Gymnasium", Huff Hall was designed in the Georgian-Revival Style by Charles A. Platt and university architect James M. White. The building's architecture matches that of the Armory, Main Library, the Union, and other campus buildings. At the conclusion of its $772,000 construction in 1925, Huff Hall replaced the Military Drill Hall (now known as Kenney Gym Annex) as the home for Fighting Illini basketball. The "New Gymnasium" was renamed Huff Gymnasium in 1937 following the longtime athletic director's passing.

== Men's basketball records at Huff Hall ==
Season	Wins	Losses	Win pct.	Total attendance
1925–26	6	3	0.667	N/A
1926–27	8	3	0.727	61,590
1927–28	3	5	0.375	48,202
1928–29	8	3	0.727	30,139*
1929–30	5	4	0.556	49,418*
1930–31	7	3	0.700	52,440
1931–32	8	2	0.800	57,000
1932–33	8	3	0.727	34,500*
1933–34	9	1	0.900	55,500
1934–35	8	2	0.800	62,000
1935–36	7	3	0.700	78,028
1936–37	7	2	0.778	63,238
1937–38	7	2	0.778	63,600
1938–39	9	1	0.900	57,933
1939–40	10	1	0.909	55,513
1940–41	8	2	0.800	52,751
1941–42	12	1	0.923	65,357
1942–43	10	0	1.000	62,648
1943–44	6	4	0.600	29,812
1944–45	7	3	0.700	44,951
1945–46	11	2	0.846	66,553
1946–47	10	1	0.909	77,808*
1947–48	11	1	0.917	78,388
1948–49	14	0	1.000	49,036*
1949–50	11	2	0.846	83,736
1950–51	12	1	0.923	75,116
1951–52	12	0	1.000	57,788*
1952–53	12	1	0.923	79,957*
1953–54	10	3	0.769	77,378
1954–55	9	2	0.818	64,721
1955–56	12	0	1.000	63,912
1956–57	9	2	0.818	68,448
1957–58	10	3	0.769	76,032
1958–59	9	3	0.750	68,292
1959–60	10	2	0.833	74,719
1960–61	7	3	0.700	60,457
1961–62	8	4	0.667	75,376
1962–63**	9	0	1.000	61,025
Totals	339	79	.811	2,283,362*

Notes:

- * incomplete or partial records.
- ** played 9 games at Huff Hall but finished season at Assembly Hall.
- N/R No Records
