= College Humor (magazine) =

American humor magazine (1920–1943)

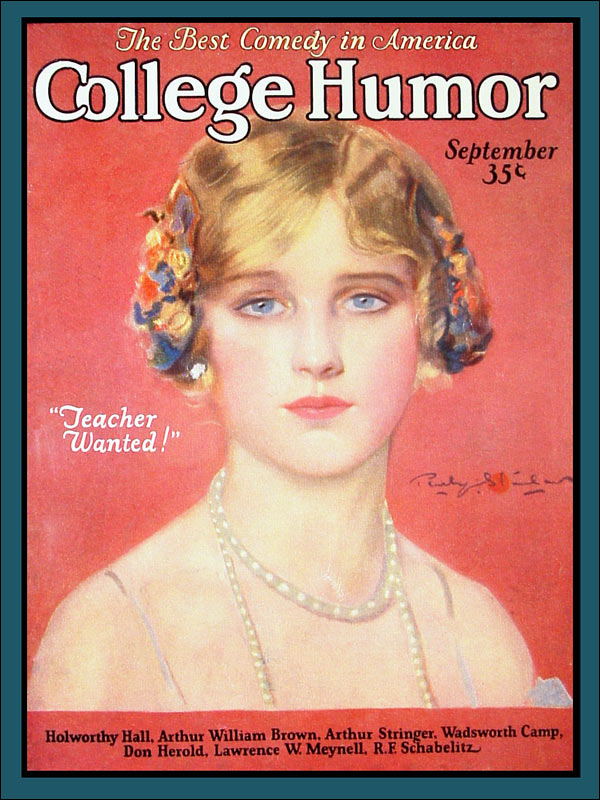
Cover of the September, 1925 issue

College Humor was an American humor magazine published from 1920 to 1943.

== History ==
College Humor was published monthly by Collegiate World Publishing. It began in 1920 with reprints from college publications and soon introduced new material, including fiction. The headquarters were in Chicago.

== Personnel ==
=== Contributors ===
Contributors included Carl Sandburg, Paul Rhymer, Walter Winchell, George Ade, Robert Benchley, Heywood Broun, Groucho Marx, Ellis Parker Butler, Katharine Brush, F. Scott Fitzgerald and Zelda Fitzgerald. Editor H.N. Swanson later became Fitzgerald's Hollywood agent.

The magazine featured cartoons by Johnny Gruelle, James Montgomery Flagg, Franklin Booth, John T. McCutcheon, Sam Berman, Ralph Fuller, John Held Jr., Otto Soglow and others.

=== Staff ===
The first editor was H. N. Swanson. After he resigned in 1932, to become story editor of RKO, managing editor Patricia Reilly took over. The magazine's sports editor was Les Gage in 1930–31.

== 1930s–40s ==
The cover price in 1930 was 35 cents (for 130 pages of content). Dell Publishing acquired the title for a run that began in November, 1934. In the late 1930s, it was purchased by Ned Pines and turned into a girlie magazine. Collegian Press, Inc. was the publisher in the early 1940s. The magazine was retitled College Humor & Sense for parts of 1933 and 1934.

The magazine ceased publication in Spring 1943.

== Other uses ==
- In 1933, Paramount Pictures released a college campus musical film titled College Humor with Bing Crosby, Jack Oakie, George Burns and Gracie Allen.
- A radio variety program titled College Humor aired on the NBC Red radio network on Tuesday nights in 1941, sponsored by the Raleigh Tobacco and Cigarettes division of the Brown & Williamson Tobacco Company. It shared the same timeslot placement to the Raleigh-sponsored, Red Skelton-led Raleigh Cigarette Program, contemporary schedules show. Produced mainly by college students and young comedians, the show focused on "the traditional hi-jinks which purportedly and really transpire on a college campus," according to a review in Movie-Radio Guide. Emceed by Tom Wallace with the Bob Strong orchestra, it featured comedians including Marlin Hurt, Franklyn MacCormack, Eddie Firestone and Linn Borden, as well as singers Virginia Verrill and Mary Ann Mercer.
