= 1916–17 NCAA men's basketball season =

Men's collegiate basketball season

- Helms National Champions: Washington State (retroactive selection in 1943)
- Player of the Year (Helms): Ray Woods, Illinois (retroactive selection in 1944)

The 1916–17 NCAA men's basketball season began in December 1916, progressed through the regular season, and concluded in March 1917.

== Season headlines ==
- In February 1943, the Helms Athletic Foundation retroactively selected Washington State as its national champion for the 1916–17 season.
- In 1995, the Premo-Porretta Power Poll retroactively selected Washington State as its top-ranked team for the 1916–17 season.

== Conference membership changes ==
School	Former Conference	New Conference
Oregon Webfoots	No basketball team	Pacific Coast Conference
Southwestern Pirates	Southwest Conference	No major basketball program
Stanford Indians	Independent	Pacific Coast Conference

NOTE: Although Oregon joined the Pacific Coast Conference in 1915, it did not field a basketball team during the 1915–16 season, and its first season of Pacific Coast Conference play was 1916–17.

== Regular season ==
=== Conferences ===
==== Conference winners ====
Conference	Regular Season Winner	Conference Player of the Year	Conference Tournament	Tournament Venue (City)	Tournament Winner
Eastern Intercollegiate Basketball League	Yale	None selected	No Tournament		
Missouri Valley Intercollegiate Athletic Association	Kansas State	None selected	No Tournament		
Pacific Coast Conference	Washington State	None selected	No Tournament		
Rocky Mountain Athletic Conference	Colorado College		No Tournament		
Southwest Conference	Texas	None selected	No Tournament		
Western Conference	Illinois & Minnesota	None selected	No Tournament		

==== Conference standings ====
1916–17 Eastern Intercollegiate Basketball League standings
	Conf.				Overall
Team	W		L	PCT	W		L	PCT
Yale	9	–	1	.900	19	–	5	.792
Princeton	8	–	2	.800	15	–	5	.750
Penn	5	–	5	.500	11	–	7	.611
Dartmouth	4	–	6	.400	10	–	12	.455
Columbia	3	–	7	.300	6	–	8	.429
Cornell	1	–	9	.100	6	–	10	.375

1916–17 Rocky Mountain Conference standings
	Conf.				Overall
Team	W		L	PCT	W		L	PCT
Colorado College	7	–	1	.875	10	–	1	.909
Colorado	6	–	2	.750	6	–	2	.750
Denver	4	–	4	.500	4	–	4	.500
Colorado Agricultural	3	–	5	.375	8	–	5	.615
Colorado Mines	0	–	8	.000	0	–	8	.000

1916–17 Missouri Valley Intercollegiate Athletic Association men's basketball standings
	Conf.				Overall
Team	W		L	PCT	W		L	PCT
Kansas State	10	–	2	.833	15	–	2	.882
Missouri	10	–	4	.714	12	–	4	.750
Iowa State	6	–	4	.600	12	–	6	.667
Kansas	9	–	7	.563	12	–	6	.667
Nebraska	4	–	8	.333	12	–	10	.545
Washington University	1	–	11	.083	6	–	13	.316
Drake	0	–	4	.000	5	–	7	.417

1916–17 Southwest Conference men's basketball standings
	Conf.				Overall
Team	W		L	PCT	W		L	PCT
Texas	7	–	1	.875	13	–	3	.813
Texas A&M	3	–	3	.500	11	–	8	.579
Baylor	0	–	6	.000	7	–	10	.412

1916–17 Pacific Coast Conference men's basketball standings
	Conf.				Overall
Team	W		L	PCT	W		L	PCT
Washington State	8	–	1	.889	25	–	1	.962
California	5	–	1	.833	15	–	1	.938
Washington	7	–	5	.583	8	–	8	.500
Oregon Agricultural	7	–	6	.538	11	–	7	.611
Stanford	0	–	6	.000	8	–	8	.500
Oregon	0	–	8	.000	0	–	11	.000

1916–17 Western Conference men's basketball standings
	Conf.				Overall
Team	W		L	PCT	W		L	PCT
Minnesota	10	–	2	.833	17	–	2	.895
Illinois	10	–	2	.833	13	–	3	.813
Purdue	7	–	2	.778	11	–	3	.786
Wisconsin	9	–	3	.750	15	–	3	.833
Indiana	3	–	5	.375	13	–	6	.684
Chicago	4	–	8	.333	13	–	15	.464
Ohio State	3	–	9	.250	15	–	11	.577
Northwestern	2	–	10	.167	3	–	11	.214
Iowa	1	–	8	.111	7	–	9	.438

=== Independents ===
A total of 129 college teams played as major independents. Among independents that played at least 10 games, Navy (11–0) and Washington and Lee (13–0) were undefeated, and Louisiana State (20–2) and Trinity (20–4) finished with the most wins.

1916–17 NCAA men's basketball independents standings
	Conf.				Overall
Team	W		L	PCT	W		L	PCT
Navy		–		–	11	–	0	1.000
Washington and Lee		–		–	13	–	0	1.000
Washington College		–		–	2	–	0	1.000
Montana State		–		–	19	–	1	.950
Western Reserve		–		–	12	–	1	.923
Kalamazoo		–		–	12	–	1	.923
Louisiana State		–		–	20	–	2	.909
Wabash		–		–	19	–	2	.905
Canisius		–		–	9	–	1	.900
Creighton		–		–	18	–	2	.900
Virginia Tech		–		–	17	–	2	.895
Georgia		–		–	8	–	1	.889
North Dakota		–		–	8	–	1	.889
Akron		–		–	14	–	2	.875
Brigham Young		–		–	14	–	2	.875
Roanoke		–		–	7	–	1	.875
Central Missouri		–		–	13	–	2	.867
Carleton		–		–	12	–	2	.857
The Citadel		–		–	6	–	1	.857
Penn State		–		–	12	–	2	.857
SMU		–		–	12	–	2	.857
Wisconsin–Stevens Point		–		–	11	–	2	.846
Arizona		–		–	10	–	2	.833
CCNY		–		–	15	–	3	.833
Trinity (N.C.)		–		–	20	–	4	.833
Denison		–		–	13	–	3	.813
Seton Hall		–		–	13	–	3	.813
Southwestern (Kan.)		–		–	13	–	3	.813
Syracuse		–		–	13	–	3	.813
Clemson		–		–	8	–	2	.800
Miami (Ohio)		–		–	12	–	3	.800
New Mexico		–		–	4	–	1	.800
Santa Clara		–		–	8	–	2	.800
Colgate		–		–	15	–	4	.789
Lehigh		–		–	15	–	4	.789
St. Joseph's		–		–	18	–	5	.783
Indiana State		–		–	13	–	4	.765
New York University		–		–	9	–	3	.750
Oklahoma A&M		–		–	11	–	4	.733
Augustana (Ill.)		–		–	8	–	3	.727
Dayton		–		–	8	–	3	.727
Fordham		–		–	8	–	3	.727
Marquette		–		–	8	–	3	.727
North Dakota Agricultural		–		–	10	–	4	.714
Saint Mary's (Calif.)		–		–	15	–	6	.714
Duquesne		–		–	7	–	3	.700
Millikin		–		–	14	–	6	.700
Nebraska Wesleyan		–		–	14	–	6	.700
Grinnell		–		–	9	–	4	.692
Bucknell		–		–	11	–	5	.688
Gettysburg		–		–	11	–	5	.688
Michigan State		–		–	11	–	5	.688
Tulane		–		–	11	–	5	.688
Marietta		–		–	13	–	6	.684
Boston University		–		–	6	–	3	.667
Georgetown		–		–	8	–	4	.667
Nevada		–		–	6	–	3	.667
New Mexico A&M		–		–	10	–	5	.667
North Central		–		–	10	–	5	.667
Pittsburgh		–		–	12	–	6	.667
Rice		–		–	10	–	5	.667
Springfield (Mass.)		–		–	10	–	5	.667
Tennessee		–		–	10	–	5	.667
Toledo		–		–	2	–	1	.667
Davidson		–		–	11	–	6	.647
VMI		–		–	9	–	5	.643
Richmond		–		–	7	–	4	.636
Bradley		–		–	10	–	6	.625
Lafayette		–		–	15	–	9	.625
Oklahoma		–		–	13	–	8	.619
Notre Dame		–		–	8	–	5	.615
Utah State		–		–	8	–	5	.615
Ole Miss		–		–	11	–	7	.611
Tulsa		–		–	11	–	7	.611
Mississippi A&M		–		–	6	–	4	.600
Wake Forest		–		–	9	–	6	.600
Virginia		–		–	7	–	5	.583
St. John's (N.Y.)		–		–	11	–	8	.579
Delaware		–		–	8	–	6	.571
Union (N.Y.)		–		–	9	–	7	.563
Detroit		–		–	5	–	4	.556
North Carolina		–		–	5	–	4	.556
North Carolina State		–		–	10	–	8	.556
Catholic		–		–	6	–	5	.545
Butler		–		–	7	–	6	.538
Western State Normal		–		–	7	–	6	.538
Temple		–		–	10	–	9	.526
Auburn		–		–	2	–	2	.500
DePauw		–		–	7	–	7	.500
Idaho		–		–	8	–	8	.500
Loyola (Md.)		–		–	6	–	6	.500
Millsaps		–		–	5	–	5	.500
Stevens Institute		–		–	3	–	3	.500
Utah		–		–	3	–	3	.500
Washington & Jefferson		–		–	5	–	5	.500
West Virginia		–		–	8	–	8	.500
Wyoming		–		–	4	–	4	.500
George Washington		–		–	7	–	8	.467
Manhattan		–		–	7	–	8	.467
South Carolina		–		–	7	–	8	.467
Grove City		–		–	5	–	6	.455
Saint Louis		–		–	5	–	6	.455
Rutgers		–		–	4	–	5	.444
Alabama		–		–	6	–	8	.429
Buffalo		–		–	6	–	8	.429
Mount Union		–		–	6	–	8	.429
Northern Colorado		–		–	5	–	7	.417
Connecticut		–		–	4	–	6	.400
Kentucky		–		–	4	–	6	.400
Southern California		–		–	8	–	12	.400
Wooster		–		–	5	–	8	.385
Swarthmore		–		–	4	–	7	.364
Franklin		–		–	1	–	2	.333
Muhlenberg		–		–	2	–	4	.333
Washburn		–		–	5	–	11	.313
William & Mary		–		–	4	–	9	.308
Niagara		–		–	2	–	5	.286
Army		–		–	3	–	8	.273
Cincinnati		–		–	3	–	8	.273
Vanderbilt		–		–	3	–	8	.273
Montana		–		–	4	–	11	.267
Bowling Green State		–		–	2	–	6	.250
Kent State		–		–	2	–	6	.250
Rhode Island State		–		–	2	–	6	.250
Rochester (N.Y.)		–		–	4	–	12	.250
Texas Christian		–		–	2	–	6	.250
Fairmount		–		–	2	–	11	.154
Ohio		–		–	2	–	14	.125
Tempe Normal		–		–	0	–	1	.000

== Awards ==
=== Helms College Basketball All-Americans ===
The practice of selecting a Consensus All-American Team did not begin until the 1928–29 season. The Helms Athletic Foundation later retroactively selected a list of All-Americans for the 1916–17 season.

Player	Team
Clyde Alwood	Illinois
Cyril Haas	Princeton
George Hjelte	California
Orson Kinney	Yale
Harold Olsen	Wisconsin
F. I. Reynolds	Kansas State
Francis Stadsvold	Minnesota
Charles Taft	Yale
Ray Woods	Illinois
Harry Young	Washington and Lee

=== Major player of the year awards ===
- Helms Player of the Year: Ray Woods, Illinois (retroactive selection in 1944)

== Coaching changes ==
A number of teams changed coaches during the season and after it ended.

Team	Former Coach	Interim Coach	New Coach	Reason
Alabama	Thomas Kelley		B. L. Noojin	
Tempe Normal	George Schaeffler		George E. Cooper	
Army	Arthur Conrad		Ivens Jones	
Bucknell	George Cockill		MAlcolm Musser	
California	Ben Carrington		Walter Christie	
Cincinnati	Ion Cortright		Whitelaw Morrison	
Clemson	Country Morris		Edward Donahue	
Colorado	James N. Ashmore		Bob Evans	
Columbia	Carl Merner		John Murray	
Dartmouth	J. A. Pelletier		Mysterious Walker	
Dayton	Alfred McCray		Al Mahrt	
Drake	Ralph Glaze		S. W. Hobbs	Glaze left to coach at Northern Colorado.
George Washington	George Colliflower		Bertram Groesbeck & Murphy	
Georgia	W. A. Cunningham		Alfred Scott	
Indiana	Guy Lowman		Dana Evans	
Indiana State	Alfred Westphal		O. E. Sink	
Kentucky	William P. Tuttle		Stanley A. Boles	
Lafayette	J. B. Quig		Bill Anderson	
Miami (Ohio)	George Little		George Rider	
Missouri	John F. Miller		Walter Meanwell	
New Mexico A&M	Clarence W. Russell		John G. Griffith	
Niagara	Tom Tracey		John O'Shea	
Northern Colorado	Paul Abbott		Ralph Glaze	
Northwestern	Fred J. Murphy		J. Norman Elliott	
Oklahoma A&M	John G. Griffith		Earl A. Pritchard	
Oregon	Hugo Bezdek		Bill Hayward	
Oregon Agricultural	Everett May		Howard Ray	
Purdue	Ward Lambert		J. J. Maloney	
Rice	Robert Cummings		Wilbur Tisdale	
Richmond	Frank Dobson		Dave E. Satterfield Jr.	
USC	Motts Blair		Dean Cromwell	
St. John's	Joseph O'Shea		John Crenny	
Temple	William Nicholai		Elwood Geiges	
Tennessee	John R. Bender		R. H. Fitzgerald	
Texas	Eugene Van Gent		Roy Henderson	
Texas A&M	W. H. H. Morris		William L. Driver	
Tulsa	Francis Schmidt		Hal Mefford	
Utah	Nelson Norgren		Thomas M. Fitzpatrick	
Vanderbilt	Guy T. Denton		Ralph Palmer	
Virginia Tech	Harlan Sandborn		Charles A. Bernier	
VMI	Frank Gorton		Earl Abell	
Wake Forest	J. R. Crozier		E. T. MacDonnell	
West Virginia	George E. Pyle		H. P. Mullenex	
William & Mary	Samuel H. Hubbard		Harry Young	
Yale	A. Bernie Tommers		Walter Mace	
