= List of Illinois Fighting Illini men's basketball seasons =

This is a list of seasons completed by the Illinois Fighting Illini men's basketball program since the team's inception.

== Seasons ==
Record table
Season	Team	Overall	Conference	Standing	Postseason
Elwood Brown (1905–1906)
1905–06	Elwood Brown	6–8	3–6	T-5th	
Frank L. Pinckney (1906–1907)
1906–07	Frank L. Pinckney	1–10	0–8	5th	
Fletcher Lane (1907–1908)
1907–08	Fletcher Lane	20–6	6–5	3rd	
Herb Juul (1908–1910)
1908–09	Herb Juul	7–6	5–6	4th	
1909–10	Herb Juul	5–4	5–4	4th	
Herb Juul:		12–10	10–10		
Thomas E. Thompson (1910–1912)
1910–11	T.E. Thompson	6–6	6–5	4th	
1911–12	T.E. Thompson	8–8	4–8	5th	
T.E. Thompson:		14–14	10–13		
Ralph Jones (1912–1920)
1912–13	Ralph Jones	10–6	7–6	5th	
1913–14	Ralph Jones	9–4	7–3	3rd	
1914–15	Ralph Jones	16–0	12–0	T–1st	Helms National Champion
1915–16	Ralph Jones	13–3	9–3	T–2nd	
1916–17	Ralph Jones	13–3	10–2	T–1st	
1917–18	Ralph Jones	9–6	6–6	T–4th	
1918–19	Ralph Jones	6–8	5–7	5th	
1919–20	Ralph Jones	9–4	8–4	3rd	
Ralph Jones:		85–34	64–31		
Frank Winters (1920–1922)
1920–21	Frank Winters	11–7	7–5	T–4th	
1921–22	Frank Winters	14–5	7–5	T–4th	
Frank Winters:		25–12	14–10		
J. Craig Ruby (1922–1936)
1922–23	J. Craig Ruby	9–6	7–5	T–4th	
1923–24	J. Craig Ruby	11–6	8–4	T–1st	
1924–25	J. Craig Ruby	11–6	8–4	T–3rd	
1925–26	J. Craig Ruby	9–8	6–6	T–5th	
1926–27	J. Craig Ruby	10–7	7–5	T–4th	
1927–28	J. Craig Ruby	5–12	2–10	T–9th	
1928–29	J. Craig Ruby	10–7	6–6	T–5th	
1929–30	J. Craig Ruby	8–8	7–5	T–4th	
1930–31	J. Craig Ruby	12–5	7–5	5th	
1931–32	J. Craig Ruby	11–6	7–5	5th	
1932–33	J. Craig Ruby	11–7	6–6	T–5th	
1933–34	J. Craig Ruby	13–6	7–5	4th	
1934–35	J. Craig Ruby	15–5	9–3	T–1st	
1935–36	J. Craig Ruby	13–6	7–5	T–3rd	
J. Craig Ruby:		148–95	94–74		
Douglas Mills (1936–1947)
1936–37	Douglas Mills	14–4	10–2	T–1st	
1937–38	Douglas Mills	9–9	4–8	T–8th	
1938–39	Douglas Mills	14–5	8–4	3rd	
1939–40	Douglas Mills	14–6	7–5	T–4th	
1940–41	Douglas Mills	13–7	7–5	T–3rd	
1941–42	Douglas Mills	18–5	13–2	T–1st	NCAA Elite Eight
1942–43	Douglas Mills	17–1	12–0	1st	
1943–44	Douglas Mills	11–9	5–7	6th	
1944–45	Douglas Mills	13–7	7–5	3rd	
1945–46	Douglas Mills	14–7	7–5	T–5th	
1946–47	Douglas Mills	14–6	8–4	T–2nd	
Douglas Mills:		151–66	88–47		
Harry Combes (1947–1967)
1947–48	Harry Combes	15–5	7–5	T–3rd	
1948–49	Harry Combes	21–4	10–2	1st	NCAA Third Place
1949–50	Harry Combes	14–8	7–5	T–3rd	
1950–51	Harry Combes	22–5	13–1	1st	NCAA Third Place
1951–52	Harry Combes	22–4	12–2	1st	NCAA Third Place
1952–53	Harry Combes	18–4	14–4	2nd	
1953–54	Harry Combes	17–5	10–4	T–3rd	
1954–55	Harry Combes	17–5	10–4	T–2nd	
1955–56	Harry Combes	18–4	11–3	2nd	
1956–57	Harry Combes	14–8	7–7	7th	
1957–58	Harry Combes	11–11	5–9	T–8th	
1958–59	Harry Combes	12–10	7–7	T–5th	
1959–60	Harry Combes	16–7	8–6	T–3rd	
1960–61	Harry Combes	9–15	5–9	7th	
1961–62	Harry Combes	15–8	7–7	T–4th	
1962–63	Harry Combes	20–6	11–3	T–1st	NCAA University Division Elite Eight
1963–64	Harry Combes	13–11	6–8	T–6th	
1964–65	Harry Combes	18–6	10–4	3rd	
1965–66	Harry Combes	12–12	8–6	T–3rd	
1966–67	Harry Combes	12–12	6–8	T–7th	
Harry Combes:		316–150	174–104		
Harv Schmidt (1967–1974)
1967–68	Harv Schmidt	11–13	6–8	T–7th	
1968–69	Harv Schmidt	19–5	9–5	T–2nd	
1969–70	Harv Schmidt	15–9	8–6	T–3rd	
1970–71	Harv Schmidt	11–12	5–9	T–5th	
1971–72	Harv Schmidt	14–10	5–9	T–8th	
1972–73	Harv Schmidt	14–10	8–6	T–3rd	
1973–74	Harv Schmidt	5–18	2–12	10th	
Harv Schmidt:		89–77	43–55		
Gene Bartow (1974–1975)
1974–75	Gene Bartow	8–18	4–14	T–9th	
Lou Henson (1975–1996)
1975–76	Lou Henson	14–13	7–11	T–7th	
1976–77	Lou Henson	16–14	8–10	6th	
1977–78	Lou Henson	13–14	7–11	7th	
1978–79	Lou Henson	19–11	7–11	7th	
1979–80	Lou Henson	22–13	8–10	T–6th	NIT Third Place
1980–81	Lou Henson	21–8	12–6	3rd	NCAA Division I Sweet Sixteen
1981–82	Lou Henson	18–11	10–8	6th	NIT second round
1982–83	Lou Henson	21–11	11–7	T–2nd	NCAA Division I first round
1983–84	Lou Henson	26–5	15–3	T–1st	NCAA Division I Elite Eight
1984–85	Lou Henson	26–9	12–6	2nd	NCAA Division I Sweet Sixteen
1985–86	Lou Henson	22–10	11–7	T–4th	NCAA Division I second round
1986–87	Lou Henson	23–8	13–5	4th	NCAA Division I first round
1987–88	Lou Henson	23–10	12–6	T–3rd	NCAA Division I second round
1988–89	Lou Henson	31–5	14–4	2nd	NCAA Division I Final Four
1989–90	Lou Henson	21–8	11–7	T–4th	NCAA Division I first round
1990–91	Lou Henson	21–10	11–7	T–3rd	Postseason ban
1991–92	Lou Henson	13–15	7–11	8th	
1992–93	Lou Henson	19–13	11–7	T–3rd	NCAA Division I second round
1993–94	Lou Henson	17–11	10–8	T–4th	NCAA Division I first round
1994–95	Lou Henson	19–12	10–8	T–5th	NCAA Division I first round
1995–96	Lou Henson	18–13	7–11	9th	NIT first round
Lou Henson:		423–224	214–164		
Lon Kruger (1996–2000)
1996–97	Lon Kruger	22–10	11–7	T–4th	NCAA Division I second round
1997–98	Lon Kruger	23–10	13–3	T–1st	NCAA Division I second round
1998–99	Lon Kruger	14–18	3–13	11th	
1999–00	Lon Kruger	22–10	11–5	4th	NCAA Division I second round
Lon Kruger:		81–48	38–28		
Bill Self (2000–2003)
2000–01	Bill Self	27–8	13–3	T–1st	NCAA Division I Elite Eight
2001–02	Bill Self	26–9	11–5	T–1st	NCAA Division I Sweet Sixteen
2002–03	Bill Self	25–7	11–5	2nd	NCAA Division I second round
Bill Self:		78–24	35–13		
Bruce Weber (2003–2012)
2003–04	Bruce Weber	26–7	13–3	1st	NCAA Division I Sweet Sixteen
2004–05	Bruce Weber	37–2	15–1	1st	NCAA Division I Runner-up
2005–06	Bruce Weber	26–7	11–5	T–2nd	NCAA Division I second round
2006–07	Bruce Weber	23–12	9–7	T–4th	NCAA Division I first round
2007–08	Bruce Weber	16–19	5–13	T–9th	
2008–09	Bruce Weber	24–10	11–7	T–2nd	NCAA Division I first round
2009–10	Bruce Weber	21–15	10–8	5th	NIT Quarterfinal
2010–11	Bruce Weber	20–14	9–9	4th	NCAA Division I second round
2011–12	Bruce Weber	17–15	6–12	9th	
Bruce Weber:		210–101	89–65		
John Groce (2012–2017)
2012–13	John Groce	23–13	8–10	T–7th	NCAA Division I second round
2013–14	John Groce	20–15	7–11	T–8th	NIT second round
2014–15	John Groce	19–14	9–9	T–7th	NIT first round
2015–16	John Groce	15–19	5–13	12th	
2016–17	John Groce; Jamall Walker	20–15^{[Note B]}	8–10	9th	NIT Quarterfinal
John Groce:		95–75	37–53		
Jamall Walker:		2–1			
Brad Underwood (2017–present)
2017–18	Brad Underwood	14–18	4–14	T–11th	
2018–19	Brad Underwood	12–21	7–13	T–10th	
2019–20	Brad Underwood	21–10	13–7	4th	No postseason held
2020–21	Brad Underwood	24–7	16–4	2nd	NCAA Division I second round
2021–22	Brad Underwood	23–10	15–5	T–1st	NCAA Division I second round
2022–23	Brad Underwood	20–13	11–9	T–5th	NCAA Division I first round
2023–24	Brad Underwood	29–9	14–6	2nd	NCAA Division I Elite Eight
2024–25	Brad Underwood	22-13	12-8	7th	NCAA Division I second round
2025–26	Brad Underwood	28-9	15-5	T-2nd	NCAA Division I Final Four
Brad Underwood:		193–110	107-71		
Total:		1,957–1,083			
National champion Postseason invitational champion Conference regular season champion Conference regular season and conference tournament champion Division regular season champion Division regular season and conference tournament champion Conference tournament champion

^A.The team was retroactively named the national champion by the Premo-Porretta Power Poll.
^B.Jamall Walker coached the last three games of the 2016–17 season in the NIT, going 2–1 as the interim coach. Groce went 18–14 over the first 32 games.
