= 1915–16 Illinois Fighting Illini men's basketball team =

American college basketball season

1915–16 Illinois Fighting Illini men's basketball
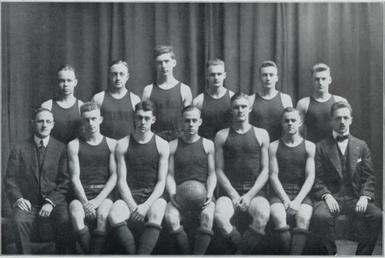
- Conference: Big Ten Conference
- Record: 13–3 (9–3 Big Ten)
- Head coach: Ralph Jones (4th season)
- Captain: Ray Woods
- Home arena: Kenney Gym

1915–16 Western Conference men's basketball standings
	Conf.				Overall
Team	W		L	PCT	W		L	PCT
Wisconsin	11	–	1	.917	20	–	1	.952
Illinois	9	–	3	.750	13	–	3	.813
Northwestern	9	–	3	.750	13	–	3	.813
Minnesota	6	–	6	.500	11	–	6	.647
Indiana	3	–	5	.375	6	–	7	.462
Chicago	4	–	8	.333	15	–	11	.577
Iowa	2	–	4	.333	11	–	4	.733
Ohio State	2	–	8	.200	9	–	13	.409
Purdue	2	–	10	.167	4	–	10	.286

The 1915–16 Illinois Fighting Illini men's basketball team represented the University of Illinois.

== Regular season ==
The 1915–16 season was a follow-up to an undefeated season, in which the Fighting Illini men's basketball team won both a national and Big Ten Conference championship. Coached by Ralph Jones, the Illini continued their winning ways by finishing the season with an overall record of 13 wins and 3 losses and a 9 win 3 loss conference mark. Taking second in the Western Conference to the National Champion Wisconsin Badgers men's basketball team. During the season, the Illini dropped two games to Northwestern and one to eventual champion Wisconsin, but the first loss to the Wildcats was the Illini's first-ever overtime game as Northwestern scored two points in the overtime period to beat Illinois, 23–21, February 12, 1916, at what is now the Kenney Gym Annex. The starting lineup included Gordon Otto, Dan W. Elwell and Ralf Woods rotating at the forward position, center C. G. Alwood, and guards Clarence Applegran and captain Ray Woods. Woods was named an All-American for his work during this season. Woods and Alwood were named All-Big Ten players for the season.

=== Roster ===
1915–16 Illinois Fighting Illini men's basketball team
Players
Coaches

Pos.	#	Name	Height	Weight	Year	Hometown
F		Clarence O. Applegran	—	—	Fr	Chicago, Illinois
F		Clyde Alwood	—	—	Jr	Clinton, Illinois
G		Ray Woods (C)	—	—	Jr	Oak Park, Illinois
G		Ralf Woods	—	—	Jr	Oak Park, Illinois
F		John B. Felmley	—	—	So	Bloomington, Illinois
F		Gordon Otto	—	—	Jr	Miami, Florida
C		Elmer T. Rundquist	—	—	So	San Antonio, Texas
F		Dan William Elwell	—	—	Jr	Champaign, Illinois
G		Vaughn Waldow Dean	—	—	Jr	Decatur, Illinois

Head coach

- Ralph Jones (Indianapolis YMCA Training School) (4th year)

Assistant coach(es)

Legend

- (C) Team captain
- (S) Suspended
- (I) Ineligible
- (W) Walk-on
- Injured
- Current redshirt

Roster

== Schedule ==
Date time, TV	Rank^{#}	Opponent^{#}	Result	Record	Site (attendance) city, state
Non-Conference regular season
12/13/1915*		Millikin	W 36–16	1–0	Kenney Gym (1,892); Urbana, IL
12/17/1915*		at Millikin University	W 34–19	2–0	Millikin Gymnasium (–); Decatur, IL
1/1/1916*		at Illinois Wesleyan	W 25–18	3–0	Bloomington YMCA (–); Bloomington, IL
1/4/1916*		Wabash College	W 24–16	4–0	Kenney Gym (–); Urbana, IL
Big Ten regular season
1/11/1916		Purdue	W 22–11	5–0 (1–0)	Kenney Gym (2,507); Urbana, IL
1/15/1916		Ohio State	W 21–10	6–0 (2–0)	Kenney Gym (2,497); Urbana, IL
1/22/1916		Wisconsin	W 27–20	7–0 (3–0)	Kenney Gym (3,383); Urbana, IL
2/9/1916		at University of Chicago	W 30–17	8–0 (4–0)	Bartlett Gymnasium (–); Chicago, IL
2/12/1916		Northwestern; Rivalry	L 21–23 ^{OT}	8–1 (4–1)	Kenney Gym (3,147); Urbana, IL
2/19/1916		at Wisconsin	L 14–34	8–2 (4–2)	University of Wisconsin Armory and Gymnasium (–); Madison, WI
2/21/1916		at Minnesota	W 27–22	9–2 (5–2)	University of Minnesota Armory (–); Minneapolis, MN
2/26/1916		University of Chicago	W 31–13	10–2 (6–2)	Kenney Gym (3,218); Urbana, IL
2/29/1916		at Northwestern; Rivalry	L 16–25	10–3 (6–3)	Patten Gymnasium (–); Evanston, IL
3/4/1916		at Purdue	W 29–19	11–3 (7–3)	Memorial Gymnasium (–); West Lafayette, IN
3/6/1916		at Ohio State	W 28–22	12–3 (8–3)	The Armory (–); Columbus, OH
3/13/1916		Minnesota	W 20–9	13–3 (9–3)	Kenney Gym (–); Urbana, IL
*Non-conference game. ^{#}Rankings from AP Poll. (#) Tournament seedings in parentheses. All times are in Central Time.

== Player stats ==
Player	Games played	Field goals	Free throws	Points
Ralf Woods	10	35	52	122
Gordon Otto	15	25	40	90
Clyde Alwood	15	45	0	90
Ray Woods	16	26	0	52
John Felmley	5	12	2	26
Dan Elwell	10	6	1	12
Clarence Applegran	16	3	0	6

== Awards and honors ==
Ray Woods was elected to the "Illini Men's Basketball All-Century Team" in 2004. Woods was also selected as an All-American for the 1915–16 season.
