= 1914–15 Wisconsin Badgers men's basketball team =

American college basketball season

1914–15 Wisconsin Badgers men's basketball
- Conference: Big Ten Conference
- Record: 13–4 (8–4 Big Ten)
- Head coach: Walter Meanwell
- Home arena: Red Gym

1914–15 Western Conference men's basketball standings
	Conf.				Overall
Team	W		L	PCT	W		L	PCT
Illinois	12	–	0	1.000	16	–	0	1.000
Chicago	9	–	3	.750	20	–	5	.800
Wisconsin	8	–	4	.667	13	–	4	.765
Minnesota	6	–	6	.500	11	–	6	.647
Northwestern	5	–	5	.500	11	–	8	.579
Purdue	4	–	8	.333	5	–	8	.385
Ohio State	3	–	9	.250	7	–	10	.412
Iowa	2	–	6	.250	9	–	8	.529
Indiana	1	–	9	.100	4	–	9	.308

The 1914–15 Wisconsin Badgers men's basketball team represented University of Wisconsin–Madison. The head coach was Walter Meanwell, coaching his fourth season with the Badgers. The team played their home games at the Red Gym in Madison, Wisconsin and was a member of the Western Conference.

== Schedule ==
Date time, TV	Rank^{#}	Opponent^{#}	Result	Record	Site city, state
Regular Season
12/11/1914*		Beloit (WI)	W 28–16	1–0	Red Gym; Madison, WI
12/14/1914*		First District Agricultural	W 45–7	2–0	Red Gym; Madison, WI
12/18/1914*		Lawrence (WI)	W 29–21	3–0	Red Gym; Madison, WI
1/02/1915*		UW–Milwaukee	W 21–10	4–0	Red Gym; Madison, WI
1/05/1915*		Grinnell (IA)	W 41–19	5–0	Red Gym; Madison, WI
1/09/1915		at Indiana	W 39–18	6–0 (1–0)	Men's Gymnasium; Bloomington, IN
1/11/1915		at Purdue	W 28–24 ^{OT}	7–0 (2–0)	Memorial Gymnasium; West Lafayette, IN
1/16/1915		at Minnesota	W 23–20	8–0 (3–0)	Minnesota Armory; Minneapolis, MN
1/18/1915		Indiana	W 47–15	9–0 (4–0)	Red Gym; Madison, WI
1/23/1915		Chicago	L 19–24	9–1 (4–1)	Red Gym; Madison, WI
2/08/1915		at Illinois	L 19–39	9–2 (4–2)	Kenney Gym; Urbana, IL
2/13/1915		Illinois	L 17–19	9–3 (4–3)	Red Gym; Madison, WI
2/16/1915		at Ohio State	W 26–17	10–3 (5–3)	Ohio State Armory; Columbus, OH
2/19/1915		Purdue	W 26–21	11–3 (6–3)	Red Gym; Madison, WI
2/27/1915		Minnesota	W 31–7	12–3 (7–3)	Red Gym; Madison, WI
3/06/1915		Ohio State	W 23–12	13–3 (8–3)	Red Gym; Madison, WI
3/12/1915		at Chicago	L 18–30	13–4 (8–4)	Bartlett Gymnasium; Chicago, IL
*Non-conference game. ^{#}Rankings from AP Poll. (#) Tournament seedings in parentheses.
