= 1917 NCAA Men's Basketball All-Americans =

- Awarded for: 1916–17 NCAA men's basketball season

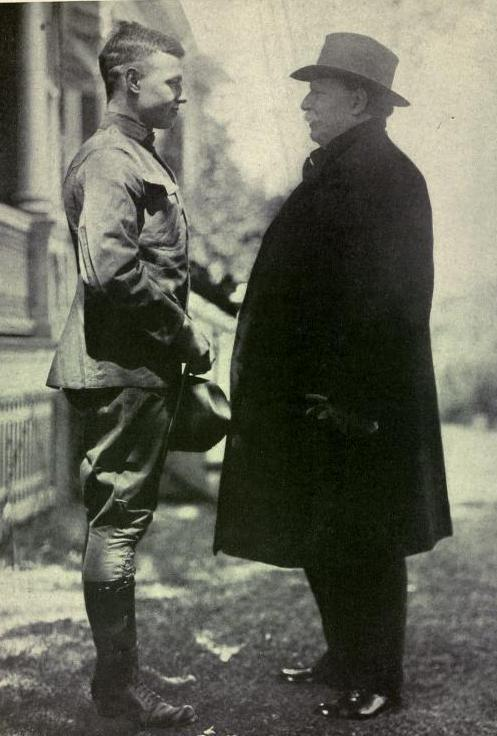
Charles Taft (left) was a Helms Foundation All-America selection at Yale.

The 1917 College Basketball All-American team was chosen retroactively by the Helms Athletic Foundation. The player highlighted in gold was chosen as the Helms Foundation College Basketball Player of the Year retroactively in 1944.

Player	Team
Clyde Alwood	Illinois
Cyril Haas	Princeton
George Hjelte	California
Orson Kinney	Yale
Harold Olsen	Wisconsin
F. I. Reynolds	Kansas State
Francis Stadsvold	Minnesota
Charles Taft	Yale
Ray Woods	Illinois
Harry Young	Washington and Lee

== See also ==
- 1916–17 NCAA men's basketball season
