= Clyde Alwood =

American basketball player (1895–1954)

Personal information
- Born: January 1, 1895 Zanesville, Ohio, US
- Died: August 14, 1954 (aged 59) Clinton, Illinois, US

Career information
- High school: Clinton (Clinton, Illinois)
- College: Illinois (1914–1917)
- Position: Forward

Career highlights
- Consensus All-American (1917); Big Ten Medal of Honor (1917)

Clyde Gobel Alwood (January 1, 1895 – August 14, 1954) was an American college basketball standout for Illinois in the 1910s. A forward, Alwood played for the Fighting Illini from 1913 to 1917, scoring 242 points in 41 games during his three years of varsity play earning a varsity letter each year. Graduating from Clinton High School, Alwood was the son of Henry Alwood and Minnie (Rundle) Alwood. He married twice in his life, his first marriage was to Martha Amy Hargitt and his second was to Doris Jean Keifer.

== University of Illinois ==
Alwood enrolled at the University of Illinois in the fall of 1913 and join the varsity basketball team. His sophomore year placed him as a starting forward for the 1914–15 Fighting Illini team that finished as the only team in Illinois history with a perfect record, 16 wins and 0 losses. This team was not only Big Ten Conference Champions, but was also retroactively named the Helms National Champion. This is the University of Illinois's only national championship in basketball. In addition, the team was retroactively listed as the top team of the season by the Premo-Poretta Power Poll. As a junior, Alwood maintained his starting role with an Illini team that finished in second place in the conference with an overall record of 13 and 3. Alwoods' senior season, while playing for hall-of-fame coach Ralph Jones, brought the Fighting Illini an additional Big Ten Conference championship. Alwood was named the team captain for the 1916–17 season and the Illini finished their schedule with an overall record of 13 wins and 3 losses and a conference record of 10 wins and 2 losses. The season brought two prestigious awards to Alwood, the Big Ten Medal of Honor, given to the one student-athlete from the graduating class of each university who had “attained the greatest proficiency in athletics and scholastic work”, while also being named a consensus All-American. This team was extremely special in the history of Illinois basketball due to the fact that it included the university's first Helms National Player of the Year, Ray Woods, as well as the National Football League's co-founder George Halas.
