= 1916–17 Illinois Fighting Illini men's basketball team =

American college basketball season

1916–17 Illinois Fighting Illini men's basketball
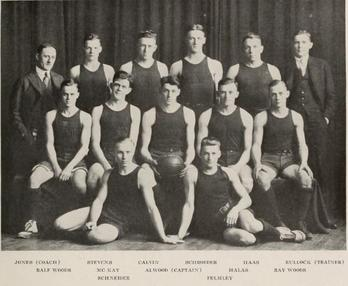

Big Ten Conference Champions
- Conference: Big Ten Conference
- Record: 13–3 (10–2 Big Ten)
- Head coach: Ralph Jones (5th season)
- Captain: Clyde Alwood
- Home arena: Kenney Gym

1916–17 Western Conference men's basketball standings
	Conf.				Overall
Team	W		L	PCT	W		L	PCT
Minnesota	10	–	2	.833	17	–	2	.895
Illinois	10	–	2	.833	13	–	3	.813
Purdue	7	–	2	.778	11	–	3	.786
Wisconsin	9	–	3	.750	15	–	3	.833
Indiana	3	–	5	.375	13	–	6	.684
Chicago	4	–	8	.333	13	–	15	.464
Ohio State	3	–	9	.250	15	–	11	.577
Northwestern	2	–	10	.167	3	–	11	.214
Iowa	1	–	8	.111	7	–	9	.438

The 1916–17 Illinois Fighting Illini men's basketball team represented the University of Illinois.

== Regular season ==
The 1916–17 season was the second Big Ten Conference championship for the Illinois Fighting Illini men's basketball team. Coached by Ralph Jones, the Illini continued their winning ways by finishing the season with an overall record of 13 wins and 3 losses and a 10-win 2-loss conference mark. The starting lineup included E. G. McKay, J. B. Felmley and Ralf Woods rotating at the forward position, captain and center C. G. Alwood, and guards George Halas and Ray Woods. Woods was named the Helms Foundation College Basketball Player of the Year for his work this season.

=== Roster ===
1916–17 Illinois Fighting Illini men's basketball team
Players
Coaches

Pos.	#	Name	Height	Weight	Year	Hometown
F		Clarence O. Applegran	—	—	So	Chicago, Illinois
G		George Halas	—	—	Jr	Chicago, Illinois
F		Clyde Alwood (C)	—	—	Sr	Clinton, Illinois
G		Ray Woods	—	—	Sr	Oak Park, Illinois
G		Ralf Woods	—	—	Sr	Oak Park, Illinois
F		Gordon Otto	—	—	Sr	Miami, Florida
F		John B. Felmley	—	—	Jr	Bloomington, Illinois
C		Elmer T. Rundquist	—	—	Jr	San Antonio, Texas
F		Dan William Elwell	—	—	Jr	Champaign, Illinois
F		Ernest G. McKay	—	—	Fr	Tampa, Florida
G		Vaughn Waldow Dean	—	—	Sr	Decatur, Illinois
G		Raymond Christian Haas	—	—	Fr	Evansville, Indiana

Head coach

- Ralph Jones (Indianapolis YMCA Training School) (5th year)

Assistant coach(es)

Legend

- (C) Team captain
- (S) Suspended
- (I) Ineligible
- (W) Walk-on
- Injured
- Current redshirt

Roster

== Schedule ==
Date time, TV	Rank^{#}	Opponent^{#}	Result	Record	Site (attendance) city, state
Non-Conference regular season
12/9/1916*		at Millikin	W 38–18	1-0	Millikin Gymnasium (-); Decatur, IL
12/15/1916*		Wabash College	L 26–28	1-1	Kenney Gym (-); Urbana, IL
12/18/1916*		Millikin University	W 38–16	2-1	Kenney Gym (-); Urbana, IL
1/3/1917*		Northwestern College	W 52–10	3-1	Kenney Gym (-); Urbana, IL
Big Ten regular season
1/6/1917		at Purdue	W 28–24	4-1 (1-0)	Memorial Gymnasium (-); West Lafayette, IN
1/8/1917		at Ohio State	W 38–14	5-1 (2-0)	The Armory (-); Columbus, OH
1/12/1917		Northwestern; Rivalry	W 45–17	6-1 (3-0)	Kenney Gym (-); Urbana, IL
1/16/1917		University of Chicago	W 20–10	7-1 (4-0)	Kenney Gym (-); Urbana, IL
1/20/1917		at Wisconsin	L 14–25	7-2 (4-1)	University of Wisconsin Armory and Gymnasium (-); Madison, WI
1/22/1917		at Minnesota	L 11–20	7-3 (4-2)	University of Minnesota Armory (-); Minneapolis, MN
2/3/1917		at University of Chicago	W 19–16	8-3 (5-2)	Bartlett Gymnasium (-); Chicago, IL
2/5/1917		Ohio State	W 34–21	9-3 (6-2)	Kenney Gym (2,315); Urbana, IL
2/10/1917		Minnesota	W 18–17	10-3 (7-2)	Kenney Gym (-); Urbana, IL
2/17/1917		Purdue	W 27–16	11-3 (8-2)	Kenney Gym (-); Urbana, IL
2/24/1917		Wisconsin	W 28–22	12-3 (9-2)	Kenney Gym (4,102); Urbana, IL
3/2/1917		Northwestern; Rivalry	W 21–12	13-3 (10-2)	Kenney Gym (-); Urbana, IL
*Non-conference game. ^{#}Rankings from AP Poll. (#) Tournament seedings in parentheses. All times are in Central Time.

== Player stats ==
Player	Games played	Field goals	Free throws	Points
Ralf Woods	16	54	70	178
Clyde Alwood	15	57	0	114
Ernest McKay	15	39	3	81
Ray Woods	16	19	0	38
John Felmley	6	7	4	18
George Halas	11	5	0	10
R.C. Haas	3	1	0	2
Gordon Otto	4	1	0	2

== Awards and honors ==
Ray Woods was elected to the "Illini Men's Basketball All-Century Team" in 2004. Woods was also selected as the Helms Foundation College Basketball Player of the Year for the 1916–17 season.

Clyde Alwood was named a Consensus All-American for the 1916–17 season.

George Halas was enshrined in the Pro Football Hall of Fame (1963), for his role in the development of the National Football League as well as for his coaching and playing for the Chicago Bears.
