= 1914–15 Indiana Hoosiers men's basketball team =

American college basketball season

1914–15 Indiana Hoosiers men's basketball
- Conference: Big Ten Conference
- Record: 4–9 (1–9 Western)
- Head coach: Arthur Berndt (2nd season)
- Captain: Frank Whitaker
- Home arena: Old Assembly Hall

1914–15 Western Conference men's basketball standings
	Conf.				Overall
Team	W		L	PCT	W		L	PCT
Illinois	12	–	0	1.000	16	–	0	1.000
Chicago	9	–	3	.750	20	–	5	.800
Wisconsin	8	–	4	.667	13	–	4	.765
Minnesota	6	–	6	.500	11	–	6	.647
Northwestern	5	–	5	.500	11	–	8	.579
Purdue	4	–	8	.333	5	–	8	.385
Ohio State	3	–	9	.250	7	–	10	.412
Iowa	2	–	6	.250	9	–	8	.529
Indiana	1	–	9	.100	4	–	9	.308

The 1914–15 Indiana Hoosiers men's basketball team represented Indiana University. Their head coach was Arthur Berndt, who was in his second and final year. The team played its home games at the Old Assembly Hall in Bloomington, Indiana, and was a member of the Western Conference.

The Hoosiers finished the regular season with an overall record of 4–9 and a conference record of 1–9, finishing 9th in the Western Conference.

== Roster ==
Name	Position	Year	Hometown
Severin Buschmann	F	So.	Indianapolis, Indiana
Rex Dale	F	N/A	Lebanon, Indiana
James Frenzel	F	Jr.	Indianapolis, Indiana
Russell Kirkpatrick	G	Jr.	Rushville, Indiana
Allen Maxwell	F	Jr.	Indianapolis, Indiana
DeWitt Mullett	G	So.	Columbia City, Indiana
Cleon Nafe	F	So.	Rochester, Indiana
William Nash	C	So.	Brazil, Indiana
John Porter	F	Jr.	Lebanon, Indiana
Clinton Prather	F	Jr.	Wheatland, Indiana
Frank Whitaker	G	Jr.	South Bend, Indiana

== Schedule/results ==
Date time, TV	Rank^{#}	Opponent^{#}	Result	Record	Site city, state
Regular season
1/9/1915		Wisconsin	L 18–39	0–1 (0–1)	Old Assembly Hall; Bloomington, IN
1/11/1915		at Illinois; Rivalry	L 14–34	0–2 (0–2)	Kenney Gym; Urbana, IL
1/16/1915		at Northwestern	L 22–30	0–3 (0–3)	Old Patten Gymnasium; Evanston, IL
1/18/1915		at Wisconsin	L 15–47	0–4 (0–4)	Red Gym; Madison, WI
1/19/1915		at Iowa	L 20–29	0–5 (0–5)	Iowa Armory; Iowa City, IA
1/26/1915		Illinois; Rivalry	L 4–20	0–6 (0–6)	Old Assembly Hall; Bloomington, IN
1/29/1915*		at Earlham	W 35–14	1–6 (0–6)	Richmond, IN
2/6/1915		Northwestern	W 31–25	2–6 (1–6)	Old Assembly Hall; Bloomington, IN
2/13/1915*		Rose Poly	W 64–15	3–6 (1–6)	Old Assembly Hall; Bloomington, IN
2/16/1915		Purdue; Rivalry	L 12–15	3–7 (1–7)	Old Assembly Hall; Bloomington, IN
2/20/1915*		Earlham	W 35–14	4–7 (1–7)	Old Assembly Hall; Bloomington, IN
2/23/1915		Iowa	L 19–20	4–8 (1–8)	Old Assembly Hall; Bloomington, IN
3/2/1915		at Purdue; Rivalry	L 15–26	4–9 (1–9)	Memorial Gymnasium; West Lafayette, IN
*Non-conference game. ^{#}Rankings from AP Poll. (#) Tournament seedings in parentheses.
