= 1914–15 Illinois Fighting Illini men's basketball team =

American college basketball season

1914–15 Illinois Fighting Illini men's basketball
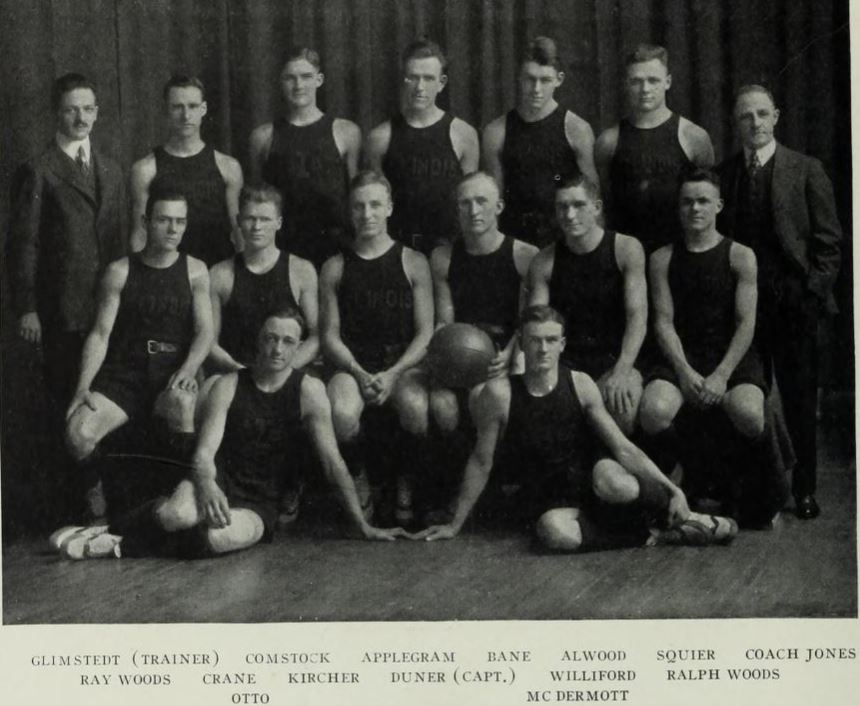

Helms Foundation National Champions Western Conference Champions
- Conference: Big Ten Conference
- Record: 16–0 (12–0 Big Ten)
- Head coach: Ralph Jones (3rd season)
- Captain: Sven Duner
- Home arena: Kenney Gym

1914–15 Western Conference men's basketball standings
	Conf.				Overall
Team	W		L	PCT	W		L	PCT
Illinois	12	–	0	1.000	16	–	0	1.000
Chicago	9	–	3	.750	20	–	5	.800
Wisconsin	8	–	4	.667	13	–	4	.765
Minnesota	6	–	6	.500	11	–	6	.647
Northwestern	5	–	5	.500	11	–	8	.579
Purdue	4	–	8	.333	5	–	8	.385
Ohio State	3	–	9	.250	7	–	10	.412
Iowa	2	–	6	.250	9	–	8	.529
Indiana	1	–	9	.100	4	–	9	.308

The 1914–15 Illinois Fighting Illini men's basketball team represented the University of Illinois.

== Regular season ==
Coached by Ralph Jones, the 1914–15 Fighting Illini men's basketball team became the first undefeated Big Ten champion in the history of the school as well as the fourth Big Ten National Champion. That 1915 season was the third in the eight-year tenure of head coach Ralph Jones and it produced the only unbeaten season in Illini history and the first Big Ten title for the Illinois basketball program. The Illinois team was retroactively named national champions by the Helms Athletic Foundation and was listed as the top team of the season by the Premo-Porretta Power Poll. Jones’ 1915 team scored twice as many points as its opponents and won the conference title by three games over Chicago. The arrival of the Woods brothers in 1914 had a lot to do with the success of this era. Guard Ray Woods was named first-team All-America all three years he competed (1915–17), and twin brother Ralf, a forward, led the team in scoring in both 1916 and 1917. His consistency at the free throw line led to the establishment of the Ralf Woods Award, which is still given annually to the Fighting Illini player with the best free-throw percentage. The starting lineup included Frank Bane at center, Clyde Alwood and Edward Allan Williford at the forward positions, captain Sven Duner at guard and brothers Ralf Woods and Ray Woods. Ray Woods was named an All-American during this season.

=== Roster ===
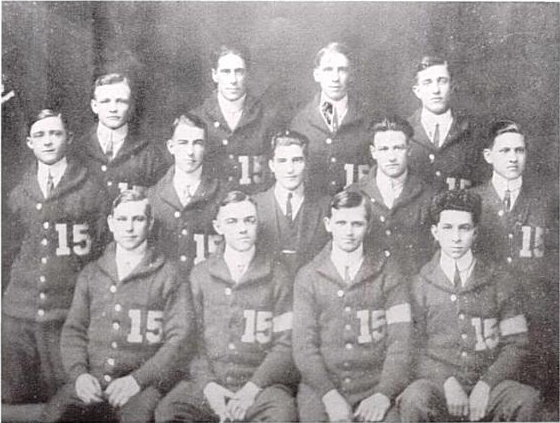
"1914-15 Fighting Illini championship team photo"

1914–15 Illinois Fighting Illini men's basketball team
Players
Coaches

Pos.	#	Name	Height	Weight	Year	Hometown
G		Sven Duner (C)	—	—	Sr	Downers Grove, Illinois
F		Helmuth Kircher	—	—	Sr	Kalamazoo, Michigan
C		Edward Williford	—	—	Sr	Binghamton, New York
G		Ray Woods	—	—	So	Oak Park, Illinois
G		Ralf Woods	—	—	So	Oak Park, Illinois
C		Frank M. Bane	—	—	Sr	Pontiac, Illinois
G		Dudley Crane	—	—	Jr	Columbus, Ohio
F		Clyde Alwood	—	—	So	Clinton, Illinois
G		Robert William Hoffman	—	—	Sr	Detroit, Michigan
C		Daniel Franklin Comstock	—	—	Sr	Evanston, Illinois
F		Walter Boynton Erwin	—	—	Sr	Chicago, Illinois
G/F		John E. Davis	—	—	Fr	Chicago, Illinois
F		Milton Owen Jensen	—	—	Sr	Kansas City, Missouri
F		Raymond Adam McDermott	—	—	So	Batavia, Illinois

Head coach

- Ralph Jones (Indianapolis YMCA Training School) (3rd year)

Assistant coach(es)

Legend

- (C) Team captain
- (S) Suspended
- (I) Ineligible
- (W) Walk-on
- Injured
- Current redshirt

Roster

== Schedule ==
Date time, TV	Rank^{#}	Opponent^{#}	Result	Record	Site city, state
Non-Conference regular season
12/8/1914*		Arkansas A.C.	W 52–6	1-0	Kenney Gym; Urbana, IL
12/12/1914*		Illinois Wesleyan	W 50–9	2-0	Kenney Gym; Urbana, IL
12/18/1914*		Millikin	W 19–16	3-0	Kenney Gym; Urbana, IL
1/2/1915*		at Peoria YMCA	W 27–14	4-0	Peoria YMCA; Peoria, IL
Big Ten regular season
1/11/1915		Indiana; Rivalry	W 34–13	5-0 (1-0)	Kenney Gym; Urbana, IL
1/16/1915		Purdue	W 27–8	6-0 (2-0)	Kenney Gym; Urbana, IL
1/23/1915		Ohio State	W 24–17	7-0 (3-0)	Kenney Gym; Urbana, IL
1/26/1915		at Indiana; Rivalry	W 20–4	8-0 (4-0)	Old Assembly Hall; Bloomington, IN
2/8/1915		Wisconsin	W 39–19	9-0 (5-0)	Kenney Gym; Urbana, IL
2/13/1915		at Wisconsin	W 19–17	10-0 (6-0)	University of Wisconsin Armory and Gymnasium; Madison, WI
2/15/1915		at Minnesota	W 20–10	11-0 (7-0)	University of Minnesota Armory; Minneapolis, MN
2/23/1915		University of Chicago	W 20–12	12-0 (8-0)	Kenney Gym; Urbana, IL
2/27/1915		at Purdue	W 22–15	13-0 (9-0)	Memorial Gymnasium; West Lafayette, IN
3/1/1915		at Ohio State	W 26–19	14-0 (10-0)	The Armory; Columbus, OH
3/6/1915		at University of Chicago	W 19–18	15-0 (11-0)	Bartlett Gymnasium; Chicago, IL
3/8/1915		Minnesota	W 26-11	16-0 (12-0)	Kenney Gym; Urbana, IL
*Non-conference game. ^{#}Rankings from AP Poll. (#) Tournament seedings in parentheses. All times are in Central Time.

== Player stats ==
Player	Games played	Field goals	Free throws	Points
Edward Williford	12	31	56	118
Frank Bane	16	50	1	101
Ralf Woods	15	35	17	87
Ray Woods	16	29	0	58
Clyde Alwood	11	19	0	38
Sven Duner	16	8	0	16
Dudley Crane	5	6	0	12

== Awards and honors ==
Ray Woods was elected to the "Illini Men's Basketball All-Century Team" in 2004. Woods was also selected as an All-American for the 1914–15 season.
