= Fred Bohler =

American college sports coach and politician

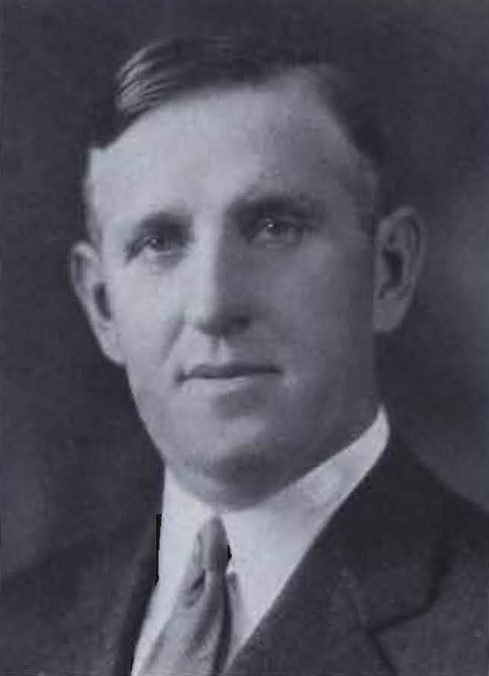
- Bohler from the 1934 Chinook

Biographical details
- Born: April 14, 1885; Reading, Pennsylvania, U.S.
- Died: July 12, 1960 (aged 75); Pullman, Washington, U.S.

Coaching career (HC unless noted)

Basketball
- 1908–1926: Washington State

Baseball
- 1916–1920: Washington State

Administrative career (AD unless noted)
- 1915–1950: Washington State
- 1950–1955: Spokane Memorial Stadium (manager)

Head coaching record
- Overall: 226–177 (basketball); 47–27–1 (baseball)

John Frederick Bohler (April 14, 1885 – July 12, 1960) was an American athlete, coach, and college athletics administrator. He served as the head basketball coach at the State College of Washington in Pullman, now Washington State University, from 1908 to 1926, compiling a record of 226–177.

Bohler's 1916–17 team finished the season with a 25–1 record and was retroactively named the national champion by the Helms Athletic Foundation. In addition, this team was retroactively listed as the top team of the season by the Premo-Porretta Power Poll. Bohler was also the head baseball coach at Washington State from 1916 to 1920, tallying a mark of 47–27–1.

The Bohler Gymnasium, opened on the WSC campus in 1928, was named for him in 1946. He was the older brother of George Bohler and Roy Bohler, also college coaches.

Bohler served on the city council in Pullman and was its mayor from 1948 to 1951. In 1950, he became the manager of the new Memorial Stadium in Spokane, which was renamed Joe Albi Stadium in 1962. Bohler died in Pullman at age 75, and is buried at its city cemetery.
