= 1916–17 Wisconsin Badgers men's basketball team =

American college basketball season

1916–17 Wisconsin Badgers men's basketball
- Conference: Big Ten Conference
- Record: 15–3 (9–3 Big Ten)
- Head coach: Walter Meanwell
- Home arena: Red Gym

1916–17 Western Conference men's basketball standings
	Conf.				Overall
Team	W		L	PCT	W		L	PCT
Minnesota	10	–	2	.833	17	–	2	.895
Illinois	10	–	2	.833	13	–	3	.813
Purdue	7	–	2	.778	11	–	3	.786
Wisconsin	9	–	3	.750	15	–	3	.833
Indiana	3	–	5	.375	13	–	6	.684
Chicago	4	–	8	.333	13	–	15	.464
Ohio State	3	–	9	.250	15	–	11	.577
Northwestern	2	–	10	.167	3	–	11	.214
Iowa	1	–	8	.111	7	–	9	.438

The 1916–17 Wisconsin Badgers men's basketball team represented University of Wisconsin–Madison. The head coach was Walter Meanwell, coaching his sixth season with the Badgers. The team played their home games at the Red Gym in Madison, Wisconsin and was a member of the Western Conference.

== Schedule ==
Date time, TV	Rank^{#}	Opponent^{#}	Result	Record	Site city, state
Regular Season
12/09/1916*		Beloit (WI)	W 58–11	1–0	Red Gym; Madison, WI
12/13/1916*		Ripon (WI)	W 30–17	2–0	Red Gym; Madison, WI
12/16/1916*		North Central (IL)	W 50–21	3–0	Red Gym; Madison, WI
12/20/1916*		Lawrence (WI)	W 41–14	4–0	Red Gym; Madison, WI
12/21/1916*		at Milwaukee M Club	W 35–23	5–0	Milwaukee, WI
1/03/1917*		at Ripon (WI)	W 24–20	6–0	Ripon, WI
1/06/1917		at Ohio State	W 30–22	7–0 (1–0)	Ohio State Armory; Columbus, OH
1/08/1917		at Northwestern	W 29–21 ^{OT}	8–0 (2–0)	Patten Gymnasium; Evanston, IL
1/13/1917		at Minnesota	L 25–33	8–1 (2–1)	Minnesota Armory; Minneapolis, MN
1/20/1917		Illinois	W 24–14	9–1 (3–1)	Red Gym; Madison, WI
1/26/1917		Chicago	L 13–21	9–2 (3–2)	Red Gym; Madison, WI
2/12/1917		Northwestern	W 23–21	10–2 (4–2)	Red Gym; Madison, WI
2/17/1917		Ohio State	W 40–15	11–2 (5–2)	Red Gym; Madison, WI
2/24/1917		at Illinois	L 17–20	11–3 (5–3)	Kenney Gym; Urbana, IL
3/03/1917		at Chicago	W 25–16	12–3 (6–3)	Bartlett Gymnasium; Chicago, IL
3/06/1917		Indiana	W 29–14	13–3 (7–3)	Red Gym; Madison, WI
3/10/1917		Minnesota	W 16–13	14–3 (8–3)	Red Gym; Madison, WI
3/15/1917		at Indiana	W 18–16	15–3 (9–3)	Men's Gymnasium; Bloomington, IN
*Non-conference game. ^{#}Rankings from AP Poll. (#) Tournament seedings in parentheses.
