= Illinois–Northwestern men's basketball rivalry =

American college basketball rivalry

- Illinois Fighting Illini Northwestern Wildcats
- Sport: College basketball
- First meeting: March 7, 1908; Illinois 18 – Northwestern 13
- Latest meeting: February 4, 2026; Illinois 84 – Northwestern 44
- Stadiums: State Farm Center, Welsh–Ryan Arena

Statistics
- Total meetings: 192
- All-time series: Illinois leads, 146–46
- Largest victory: Illinois, 42, twice (86–44), 1943 at NU (99–57), 1995 at IL
- Longest win streak: Illinois, 16 twice (1947-1955 & 1984-1991)
- Current win streak: Illinois, 3 (2025–present)

Locations of Illinois and Northwestern

The Illinois–Northwestern men's basketball rivalry is an intra-Big Ten Conference, college sports rivalry between the Illinois Fighting Illini and Northwestern Wildcats. Multiple factors have played into the creation of the games between the two schools; Illinois and Northwestern are both located within the state of Illinois and are located about 157 miles (253 km) apart, and they share recruiting ground.

== History ==
Illinois and Northwestern first met on March 7, 1908, with an Illinois victory, 18–13. The teams would continue to compete annually with the exception of 12 seasons. Since the two teams are both in the Big Ten Conference, they meet at least once per season. The location of the game alternates between State Farm Center, formerly Assembly Hall, in Champaign, and in Evanston at Welsh–Ryan Arena. There have only been a total of five neutral site games in this series with Illinois winning all of those games. Illinois leads the series 146–46.

Occasional feuds and incidents between the schools' programs have fueled the competition over the years. Illinois has the advantage in the history of the Big Ten tournament. Of the 20+ years the conference tournament has been held, Illinois and Northwestern have played a total of 3 times. Illinois holds the record of 3–0 over Northwestern.

== Accomplishments by the two rivals ==
The following summarizes the accomplishments of the two programs.

Team	Illinois	Northwestern
National titles	0	0
Final Four appearances	6	0
NCAA Tournament appearances	36	3
NCAA Tournament record	50–37	3–3
Big Ten tournament titles	4	0
Big Ten regular season titles	18	2
Consensus First Team All-Americans	16	4
Naismith Players of the Year	0	0
Big Ten Players of the Year	3	0
Big Ten Medal of Honor Recipients	19	17
All-time program record	1955–1085	1196–1632–1
All-time winning percentage	.643	.423

- Through April 5, 2026

=== Game results ===
Winning team is shown. Ranking of the team at the time of the game by the AP poll is shown by the team name.

- *Denotes game played during the Big Ten tournament

Illinois victories	Northwestern victories	Tie games

No.	Date	Location	Winner	Score
1	March 7, 1908	Patten Gymnasium	Illinois	18–13
2	February 27, 1909	Patten Gymnasium	Illinois	35–4
3	February 25, 1911	Patten Gymnasium	Illinois	26–15
4	March 2, 1912	Kenney Gym	Illinois	25–10
5	March 9, 1912	Patten Gymnasium	Illinois	30–19
6	February 14, 1913	Kenney Gym	Illinois	23–22
7	March 15, 1913	Patten Gymnasium	Northwestern	20–18
8	February 14, 1914	Kenney Gym	Illinois	35–15
9	February 12, 1916	Kenney Gym	Northwestern	23–21^{OT}
10	February 29, 1916	Kenney Gym	Northwestern	25–16
11	January 12, 1917	Kenney Gym	Illinois	45–17
12	March 2, 1917	Patten Gymnasium	Illinois	21–12
13	February 9, 1918	Kenney Gym	Illinois	38–22
14	March 2, 1918	Patten Gymnasium	Northwestern	29–14
15	January 17, 1924	Kenney Gym	Illinois	38–18
16	March 4, 1924	Patten Gymnasium	Illinois	36–35^{OT}
17	January 14, 1925	Patten Gymnasium	Illinois	27–16
18	February 12, 1925	Huff Gym	Illinois	30–20
19	January 9, 1927	Patten Gymnasium	Illinois	27–23
20	February 16, 1927	Kenney Gym	Illinois	46–32
21	February 8, 1928	Huff Gym	Illinois	32–20
22	March 1, 1928	Patten Gymnasium	Northwestern	39–31
23	February 10, 1930	Patten Gymnasium	Illinois	30–24
24	February 22, 1930	Huff Gym	Northwestern	34–32
25	January 12, 1931	Huff Gym	Northwestern	29–27
26	February 16, 1931	Patten Gymnasium	Illinois	35–28
27	January 7, 1933	Huff Gym	Illinois	27–25
28	January 27, 1933	Patten Gymnasium	Northwestern	30–27
29	January 20, 1934	Huff Gym	Illinois	34–20
30	February 19, 1934	Patten Gymnasium	Northwestern	32–25
31	January 18, 1936	Huff Gym	Northwestern	40–28
32	February 17, 1936	Patten Gymnasium	Illinois	39–38
33	January 4, 1937	Huff Gym	Northwestern	47–38
34	March 6, 1937	Patten Gymnasium	Illinois	32–26
35	February 27, 1939	Patten Gymnasium	Northwestern	36–34
36	February 12, 1940	Huff Gym	Northwestern	33–25
37	January 18, 1941	Patten Gymnasium	Illinois	42–41
38	February 7, 1942	Huff Gym	Illinois	41–33
39	February 28, 1942	Chicago Stadium	Illinois	63–49
40	February 1, 1943	Huff Gym	Illinois	68–51
41	February 27, 1943	Chicago Stadium	Illinois	86–44
42	February 11, 1944	Chicago Stadium	Northwestern	42–29
43	February 25, 1944	Chicago Stadium	Illinois	50–47
44	January 19, 1945	Huff Gym	Illinois	51–42
45	February 24, 1945	Chicago Stadium	Northwestern	57–45
46	January 14, 1946	Huff Gym	Illinois	45–38
47	February 16, 1946	Chicago Stadium	Northwestern	48–43
48	January 11, 1947	Huff Gym	Illinois	55–40
49	February 22, 1947	Chicago Stadium	Illinois	52–51
50	January 5, 1948	Huff Gym	Illinois	52–47
51	February 28, 1948	Chicago Stadium	Illinois	60–43
52	February 7, 1949	Huff Gym	No. 4 Illinois	85–66
53	February 26, 1949	Chicago Stadium	No. 4 Illinois	81–64
54	January 16, 1950	Huff Gym	Illinois	76–50
55	March 4, 1950	Chicago Stadium	Illinois	69–52
56	March 3, 1951	Chicago Stadium	No. 6 Illinois	80–76
57	March 3, 1952	Huff Gym	No. 2 Illinois	95–74
58	January 12, 1953	Huff Gym	No. 4 Illinois	83–58
59	March 9, 1953	McGaw Memorial Hall	No. 10 Illinois	86–70
60	January 4, 1954	McGaw Memorial Hall	No. 8 Illinois	66–65
61	March 1, 1954	Huff Hall	No. 20 Illinois	84–82
62	February 5, 1955	Huff Gym	No. 10 Illinois	104–89
63	March 5, 1955	McGaw Memorial Hall	No. 17 Illinois	81–69
64	March 5, 1956	McGaw Memorial Hall	Northwestern	83–82
65	February 11, 1957	Huff Gym	No. 15 Illinois	104–97
66	February 1, 1958	Huff Gym	Illinois	102–98
67	March 8, 1958	McGaw Memorial Hall	Northwestern	88–72
68	February 7, 1959	McGaw Memorial Hall	Northwestern	88–79
69	March 7, 1959	Huff Gym	Northwestern	84–81
70	December 29, 1959	Los Angeles; Memorial Sports Arena	No. 8 Illinois	92–79
71	March 5, 1960	McGaw Memorial Hall	Illinois	84–77
72	February 18, 1961	Huff Gym	Northwestern	78–72
73	February 12, 1962	Huff Gym	Illinois	88–70
74	March 10, 1962	McGaw Memorial Hall	Illinois	73–69
75	January 14, 1963	McGaw Memorial Hall	No. 5 Illinois	78–76
76	March 4, 1963	Assembly Hall	No. 6 Illinois	79–73
77	February 1, 1964	Assembly Hall	Illinois	73–71
78	March 2, 1965	McGaw Memorial Hall	Illinois	93–70
79	February 7, 1966	Assembly Hall	Northwestern	80–77
80	March 7, 1966	McGaw Memorial Hall	Northwestern	84–76
81	January 10, 1967	McGaw Memorial Hall	Northwestern	104–96
82	February 4, 1967	Assembly Hall	Illinois	93–83
83	February 10, 1968	McGaw Memorial Hall	Northwestern	78–71
84	February 24, 1968	Assembly Hall	Illinois	62–61
85	January 11, 1969	McGaw Memorial Hall	No. 4 Illinois	82–77^{OT}
86	March 8, 1969	Assembly Hall	No. 20 Illinois	78–68
87	January 13, 1970	McGaw Memorial Hall	No. 17 Illinois	101–80
88	March 9, 1971	Assembly Hall	Northwestern	85–70
89	January 8, 1972	McGaw Memorial Hall	Illinois	67–63
90	February 5, 1972	Assembly Hall	Illinois	68–59
91	February 5, 1973	McGaw Memorial Hall	Illinois	84–77
92	March 5, 1973	Assembly Hall	Illinois	77–76
93	February 16, 1974	McGaw Memorial Hall	Northwestern	86–75
94	January 11, 1975	Assembly Hall	Illinois	64–60
95	February 8, 1975	McGaw Memorial Hall	Northwestern	51–47
96	January 10, 1976	Assembly Hall	Illinois	74–69
97	February 7, 1976	McGaw Memorial Hall	Illinois	61–55

No.	Date	Location	Winner	Score
98	January 24, 1977	Assembly Hall	Illinois	71–68
99	February 10, 1977	McGaw Memorial Hall	Illinois	65–63
100	January 21, 1978	Assembly Hall	Illinois	73–64
101	February 9, 1978	McGaw Memorial Hall	Northwestern	72–61
102	January 6, 1979	McGaw Memorial Hall	No. 4 Illinois	74–56
103	March 1, 1979	Assembly Hall	Northwestern	71–64
104	January 5, 1980	Assembly Hall	No. 20 Illinois	81–71
105	February 28, 1980	McGaw Memorial Hall	Illinois	90–66
106	January 8, 1981	McGaw Memorial Hall	No. 12 Illinois	88–64
107	March 7, 1981	Assembly Hall	No. 16 Illinois	98–76
108	January 7, 1982	McGaw Memorial Hall	Illinois	60–50
109	March 6, 1982	Assembly Hall	Illinois	85–65
110	February 5, 1983	Assembly Hall	Illinois	78–62
111	February 10, 1983	Welsh-Ryan Arena	Northwestern	58–55
112	February 4, 1984	Welsh–Ryan Arena	No. 8 Illinois	71–52
113	February 8, 1984	Assembly Hall	No. 8 Illinois	73–49
114	January 19, 1985	Welsh–Ryan Arena	No. 11 Illinois	55–43
115	February 14, 1985	Assembly Hall	No. 17 Illinois	64–42
116	January 18, 1986	Assembly Hall	Illinois	72–46
117	February 13, 1986	Welsh–Ryan Arena	Illinois	75–52
118	January 10, 1987	Welsh–Ryan Arena	No. 12 Illinois	76–69
119	February 5, 1987	Assembly Hall	No. 14 Illinois	72–43
120	January 23, 1988	Assembly Hall	No. 13 Illinois	79–48
121	March 12, 1988	Welsh–Ryan Arena	No. 19 Illinois	79–74
122	January 19, 1989	Welsh–Ryan Arena	No. 2 Illinois	75–70
123	February 11, 1989	Assembly Hall	No. 7 Illinois	86–69
124	January 13, 1990	Welsh–Ryan Arena	No. 8 Illinois	85–78
125	February 14, 1990	Assembly Hall	No. 15 Illinois	88–75
126	February 4, 1991	Assembly Hall	Illinois	73–59
127	March 2, 1991	Welsh–Ryan Arena	Illinois	91–81
128	February 1, 1992	Welsh–Ryan Arena	Northwestern	46–43
129	February 26, 1992	Assembly Hall	Illinois	92–65
130	January 7, 1993	Welsh–Ryan Arena	Illinois	81–71
131	February 6, 1993	Assembly Hall	Illinois	82–67
132	January 12, 1994	Assembly Hall	Illinois	81–53
133	February 12, 1994	Welsh–Ryan Arena	Northwestern	79–68
134	January 7, 1995	Welsh–Ryan Arena	Illinois	82–55
135	March 8, 1995	Assembly Hall	Illinois	99–57
136	January 27, 1996	Welsh–Ryan Arena	Illinois	74–62
137	February 14, 1996	Assembly Hall	Illinois	93–62
138	February 5, 1997	Assembly Hall	Illinois	70–58
139	January 10, 1998	Welsh–Ryan Arena	Illinois	59–44
140	February 18, 1998	Assembly Hall	No. 23 Illinois	69–57
141	January 9, 1999	Assembly Hall	Northwestern	59–46
142	February 17, 1999	Welsh–Ryan Arena	Illinois	69–63
143	February 19, 2000	Welsh–Ryan Arena	Illinois	63–30
144	March 4, 2000	Assembly Hall	No. 25 Illinois	73–44
145	January 17, 2001	Welsh–Ryan Arena	No. 11 Illinois	63–49
146	February 3, 2001	Assembly Hall	No. 6 Illinois	84–59
147	February 23, 2002	Welsh–Ryan Arena	No. 16 Illinois	56–41
148	February 22, 2003	United Center	No. 20 Illinois	73–61
149	March 14, 2003*	United Center	No. 13 Illinois	94–65
150	January 14, 2004	Welsh–Ryan Arena	Northwestern	70–60
151	February 28, 2004	Assembly Hall	No. 23 Illinois	66–56
152	January 15, 2005	Welsh–Ryan Arena	No. 1 Illinois	78–66
153	February 23, 2005	Assembly Hall	No. 1 Illinois	84–48
154	March 11, 2005*	United Center	No. 1 Illinois	68–51
155	January 21, 2006	Welsh–Ryan Arena	No. 7 Illinois	58–47
156	February 15, 2006	Assembly Hall	No. 14 Illinois	63–47
157	February 7, 2007	Welsh–Ryan Arena	Illinois	58–43
158	February 18, 2007	Assembly Hall	Illinois	48–37
159	January 27, 2008	Assembly Hall	Illinois	70–37
160	February 12, 2009	Welsh–Ryan Arena	No. 22 Illinois	60–59
161	December 30, 2009	Assembly Hall	Illinois	89–83^{OT}
162	January 23, 2010	Welsh–Ryan Arena	Northwestern	73–68
163	January 2, 2011	Assembly Hall	No. 20 Illinois	88–63
164	February 5, 2011	Welsh–Ryan Arena	Northwestern	71–70
165	January 4, 2012	Welsh–Ryan Arena	Illinois	57–56
166	February 5, 2012	Assembly Hall	Northwestern	74–70
167	January 17, 2013	Assembly Hall	Northwestern	68–54
168	February 17, 2013	Welsh–Ryan Arena	Illinois	62–41
169	January 12, 2014	Welsh–Ryan Arena	Northwestern	49–43
170	January 14, 2015	Welsh–Ryan Arena	Illinois	72–67
171	February 28, 2015	State Farm Center	Illinois	86–60
172	February 13, 2016	Welsh–Ryan Arena	Northwestern	58–56
173	February 7, 2017	Welsh–Ryan Arena	Illinois	68–61
174	February 21, 2017	State Farm Center	Illinois	66–50
175	December 1, 2017	Rosemont Horizon	Northwestern	72–68^{OT}
176	January 6, 2019	Welsh–Ryan Arena	Northwestern	68–66
177	March 3, 2019	State Farm Center	Illinois	81–76
178	March 13, 2019*	United Center	Illinois	74–69^{OT}
179	January 18, 2020	State Farm Center	No. 24 Illinois	75–71
180	February 27, 2020	Welsh–Ryan Arena	Illinois	74–66
181	January 7, 2021	Welsh–Ryan Arena	No. 12 Illinois	81–56
182	February 16, 2021	State Farm Center	No. 5 Illinois	73–66
183	January 29, 2022	Welsh–Ryan Arena	No. 24 Illinois	59–56
184	February 13, 2022	State Farm Center	No. 12 Illinois	73–66
185	January 4, 2023	Welsh–Ryan Arena	Northwestern	73–60
186	February 23, 2023	State Farm Center	Illinois	66–62
187	January 2, 2024	State Farm Center	No. 9 Illinois	96–66
188	January 24, 2024	Welsh–Ryan Arena	Northwestern	96–91^{OT}
189	December 6, 2024	Welsh–Ryan Arena	Northwestern	70–66^{OT}
190	January 26, 2025	State Farm Center	No. 17 Illinois	83–74
191	January 14, 2026	Welsh–Ryan Arena	No. 13 Illinois	79–68
192	February 4, 2026	State Farm Center	No. 5 Illinois	84–44
Series: Illinois leads 146–46

== Series statistics ==
- Series record: Illinois leads 146 to 46
- Current streak: Illinois, 3 win
- Illinois when ranked: 57–8
- Northwestern when ranked: 0–2
- When both teams are ranked: 0–0
- Illinois home record: 75–15
- Northwestern home record: 27–58
- Neutral site: Illinois leads 13–4
- In overtime games: tied 4–4
- Longest Illinois win streak: 16, twice (Last, 2/4/1984 – 3/2/1991)
- Longest Northwestern win streak: 3, twice (Last, 2/7/1966 – 1/10/1967)
- Longest Illinois home win streak: 19, (1/5/1980 – 2/18/1998)
- Longest Northwestern home win streak: 3, (Last, 1/4/2023 – 12/6/2024)
- Longest Illinois road win streak: 8, (2/4/1984 – 3/2/1989)
- Longest Northwestern road win streak: 3, (1/18/1936 – 2/12/1940)
- Largest Illinois home win margin: 42, (99–57), 3/8/1995
- Largest Illinois road win margin: 42, (86–44), 2/27/1943
- Largest Northwestern home win margin: 16, (88–72), 3/8/1958
- Largest Northwestern road win margin: 15, (29–14), 3/2/1917
