= 1916–17 Washington State men's basketball team =

American college basketball season

1916–17 Washington State men's basketball
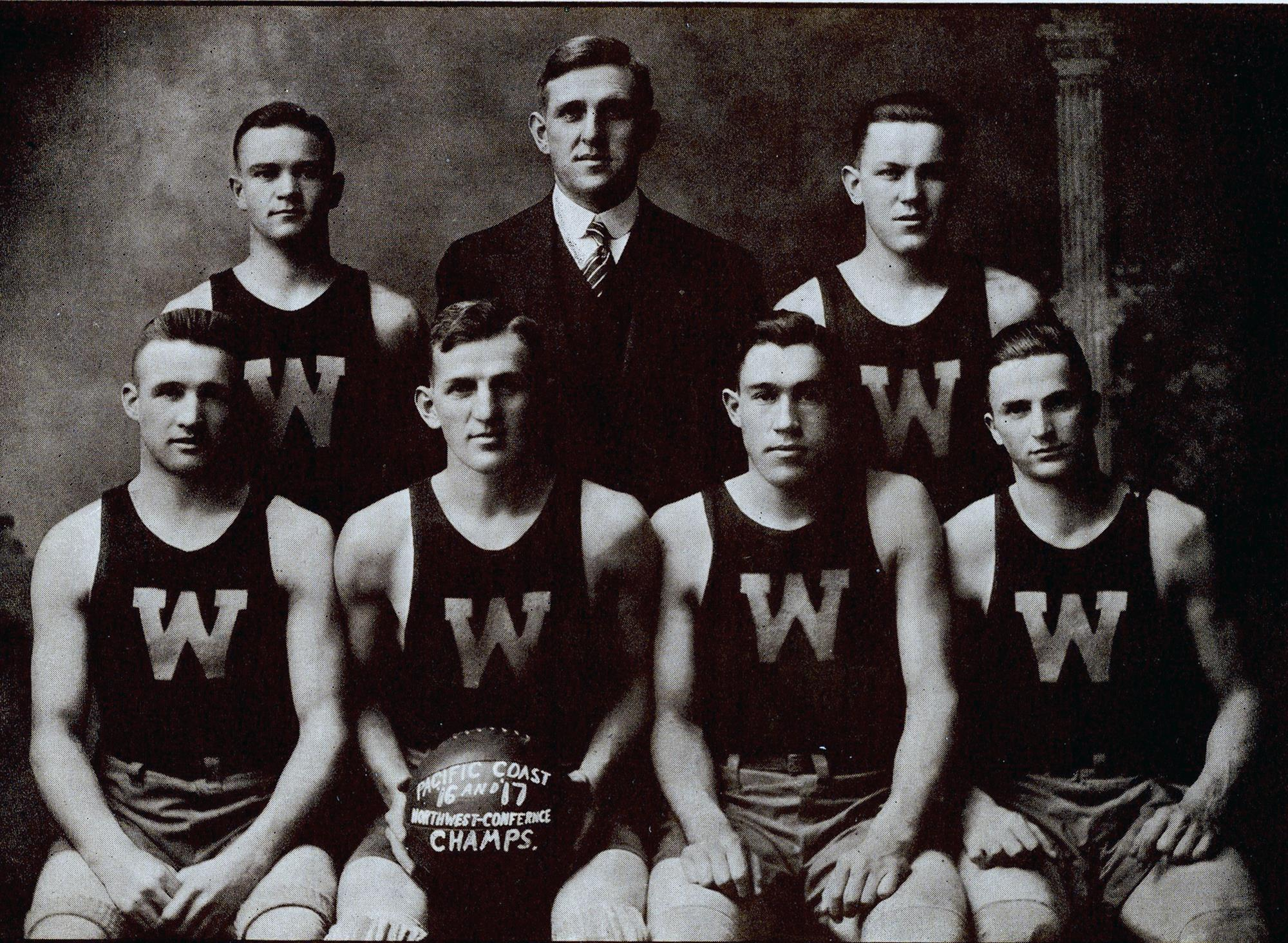

Northwest Conference Champions Pacific Coast Conference Champions Helms Foundation National Champions
- Conference: Pacific Coast Conference; Northwest Conference
- Record: 25–1 (8–1 PCC)
- Head coach: Fred Bohler (9th season)
- Captain: Roy Bohler

1916–17 Pacific Coast Conference men's basketball standings
	Conf.				Overall
Team	W		L	PCT	W		L	PCT
Washington State	8	–	1	.889	25	–	1	.962
California	5	–	1	.833	15	–	1	.938
Washington	7	–	5	.583	8	–	8	.500
Oregon Agricultural	7	–	6	.538	11	–	7	.611
Stanford	0	–	6	.000	8	–	8	.500
Oregon	0	–	8	.000	0	–	11	.000

The 1916–17 Washington State men's basketball team represented Washington State College in intercollegiate basketball during the 1916–17 season. The team finished the season with a 25–1 record and was the champion of the Pacific Coast Conference. The team was retroactively named the national champion by the Helms Athletic Foundation and was retroactively listed as the top team of the season by the Premo-Porretta Power Poll. Ivan Price and Roy Bohler (Fred's younger brother and captain of the team) were named to the All-Pacific Coast Conference team at the end of the season.

== Schedule and results ==
Date time, TV	Rank^{#}	Opponent^{#}	Result	Record	Site city, state
Regular season
12/26/1916*		at Davenport HS	W 63–6	1–0	Davenport, WA
12/27/1916*		at Almira Athletic Club	W 72–13	2–0	Almira, WA
12/28/1916*		at Reardan Athletic Club	W 38–17	3–0	Reardan, WA
12/29/1916*		at Ritzville Athletic Club	W 48–14	4–0	Ritzville, WA
12/30/1916*		at Spokane Athletic Club	W 32–28	5–0	Spokane, WA
1/5/1917*		Whitworth	W 64–22	6–0	Pullman, WA
1/11/1917		Washington	W 37–25	7–0 (1–0)	Pullman, WA
1/12/1917		Washington	W 41–24	8–0 (2–0)	Pullman, WA
1/19/1917		at Washington	W 31–24	9–0 (3–0)	Seattle, WA
1/20/1917		at Washington	W 26–14	10–0 (4–0)	Seattle, WA
1/22/1917*		at Whitman	W 45–14	11–0	Walla Walla, WA
1/23/1917*		at Whitman	W 37–19	12–0	Walla Walla, WA
1/26/1917*		at Idaho	W 40–26	13–0	Moscow, ID
1/27/1917*		Idaho	W 58–26	14–0	Pullman, WA
1/31/1917*		at Willamette	W 35–18	15–0	Salem, OR
2/2/1917		at California	L 20–28	15–1 (4–1)	Berkeley, CA
2/3/1917		at California	W 32–29	16–1 (5–1)	Berkeley, CA
2/5/1917		at Stanford	W 36–18	17–1 (6–1)	Stanford, CA
2/6/1917		at Stanford	W 23–15	18–1 (7–1)	Stanford, CA
2/9/1917		at Oregon State	W 28–17	19–1 (8–1)	Men's Gymnasium; Corvallis, OR
2/10/1917*		at Multnomah Athletic Club	W 28–11	20–1	Multnomah, OR
2/15/1917*		Montana	W 33–22	21–1	Pullman, WA
2/23/1917*		Whitman	W 44–19	22–1	Pullman, WA
2/24/1917*		Whitman	W 41–25	23–1	Pullman, WA
2/28/1917*		at Idaho	W 42–31	24–1	Moscow, ID
3/1/1917*		Idaho	W 53–10	25–1	Pullman, WA
*Non-conference game. ^{#}Rankings from AP Poll. (#) Tournament seedings in parentheses.
