= Clarence Applegran =

American basketball and football coach (1893–1960)

Biographical details
- Born: November 6, 1893; Chicago, Illinois, U.S.
- Died: May 6, 1960 (aged 66); Chicago, Illinois, U.S.

Playing career
- 1915–1920: Illinois
- Position: Forward

Coaching career (HC unless noted)

Basketball
- 1920–1921: Allegheny
- 1921–1923: Washington University
- 1924–1925: Kentucky

Football career

Profile
- Position: Guard

Personal information
- Listed height: 6 ft 2 in (1.88 m)
- Listed weight: 200 lb (91 kg)

Career information
- High school: Lake View (Chicago, Illinois, U.S.)
- College: Illinois (1915–1920)

Career history

Playing
- Detroit Heralds (1920)

Coaching
- Allegheny (1920)

Awards and highlights
- All-American (1919)

Career statistics
- Games: 4
- Stats at Pro Football Reference

Clarence O. Applegran (November 6, 1893 – May 6, 1960) was an American basketball coach. He was the head coach of the Kentucky Wildcats men's basketball team of the University of Kentucky in 1924–1925, and compiled a 13–8 record.

Applegran attended the University of Illinois and played football and basketball. During the 1919 season, Applegran earned All-American honors as a guard for the Fighting Illini football team. He later played professional football for the Detroit Heralds for the 1920 season before beginning his coaching career.

Applegran, who served in World Wars I and II and rose to the rank of colonel, finished his career at South Shore High School in Chicago, Illinois. At the school, Applegran was known for a booming baritone voice that required no amplification during pep rallies held in the large auditorium.
