= 1916–17 Indiana Hoosiers men's basketball team =

American college basketball season

1916–17 Indiana Hoosiers men's basketball
- Conference: Big Ten Conference
- Record: 13–6 (3–5 Western)
- Head coach: Guy Lowman (1st season)
- Captain: Severin Buschmann
- Home arena: Old Assembly Hall / Men's Gymnasium

1916–17 Western Conference men's basketball standings
	Conf.				Overall
Team	W		L	PCT	W		L	PCT
Minnesota	10	–	2	.833	17	–	2	.895
Illinois	10	–	2	.833	13	–	3	.813
Purdue	7	–	2	.778	11	–	3	.786
Wisconsin	9	–	3	.750	15	–	3	.833
Indiana	3	–	5	.375	13	–	6	.684
Chicago	4	–	8	.333	13	–	15	.464
Ohio State	3	–	9	.250	15	–	11	.577
Northwestern	2	–	10	.167	3	–	11	.214
Iowa	1	–	8	.111	7	–	9	.438

The 1916–17 Indiana Hoosiers men's basketball team represented Indiana University. Their head coach was Guy Lowman, who was in his 1st and only year. The team played its home games at the Old Assembly Hall before moving to the newly constructed Men's Gymnasium in Bloomington, Indiana, and was a member of the Western Conference.

The Hoosiers finished the regular season with an overall record of 13–6 and a conference record of 3–5, finishing 5th in the Western Conference.

== Roster ==
Name	Position	Year	Hometown
Phillip Bowser	C	Jr.	Syracuse, Indiana
Severin Buschmann	F	Sr.	Indianapolis, Indiana
Arlo Byrum	G	So.	Anderson, Indiana
Henry Miller	G	N/A	Bloomington, Indiana
DeWitt Mullett	G	Sr.	Columbia City, Indiana
Cleon Nafe	F	Sr.	Rochester, Indiana
W. Penn Nash	C	Sr.	Brazil, Indiana
George Reed	G	N/A	Bloomington, Indiana
Bob Rogers	F	N/A	Bloomington, Indiana
Herm Schuler	F	So.	Elkhart, Indiana
Heber Williams	F	So.	Kokomo, Indiana
William Zellar	F	Fr.	Brazil, Indiana

== Schedule/results ==
Date time, TV	Rank^{#}	Opponent^{#}	Result	Record	Site city, state
Regular season
12/8/1916*		Indiana Dental College	W 40–10	1–0	Old Assembly Hall; Bloomington, IN
12/15/1916*		Earlham	W 44–23	2–0	Old Assembly Hall; Bloomington, IN
12/18/1916*		Vincennes YMCA	W 28–18	3–0	Old Assembly Hall; Bloomington, IN
1/3/1917*		DePauw	W 24–14	4–0	Old Assembly Hall; Bloomington, IN
1/5/1917*		Rose Poly	W 35–9	5–0	Old Assembly Hall; Bloomington, IN
1/12/1917		at Iowa	W 21–12	6–0 (1–0)	Iowa Armory; Iowa City, IA
1/13/1917*		at Iowa State Teachers College	W 29–13	7–0 (1–0)	Cedar Falls, IA
1/19/1917		Iowa	W 12–7	8–0 (2–0)	Men's Gymnasium; Bloomington, IN
1/28/1917		Purdue; Rivalry	L 15–22	8–1 (2–1)	Men's Gymnasium; Bloomington, IN
2/2/1917*		Butler	W 18–9	9–1 (2–1)	Men's Gymnasium; Bloomington, IN
2/6/1917		at Purdue; Rivalry	L 18–24	9–2 (2–2)	Memorial Gymnasium; West Lafayette, IN
2/8/1917*		at DePauw	W 14–13	10–2 (2–2)	Greencastle, IN
2/9/1917*		Central Nation College	W 61–9	11–2 (2–2)	Men's Gymnasium; Bloomington, IN
2/16/1917*		Wabash	L 17–20	11–3 (2–2)	Men's Gymnasium; Bloomington, IN
2/24/1917		at Ohio State	W 24–19	12–3 (3–2)	Columbus, OH
3/2/1917		Ohio State	L 14–30	12–4 (3–3)	Men's Gymnasium; Bloomington, IN
3/6/1917		at Wisconsin	L 13–29	12–5 (3–4)	Red Gym; Madison, WI
3/7/1917*		at Milwaukee Normal College	W 39–12	13–5 (3–4)	Milwaukee, WI
3/15/1917		Wisconsin	L 16–18	13–6 (3–5)	Men's Gymnasium; Bloomington, IN
*Non-conference game. ^{#}Rankings from AP Poll. (#) Tournament seedings in parentheses.
