= Francis Stadsvold =

American basketball player and coach

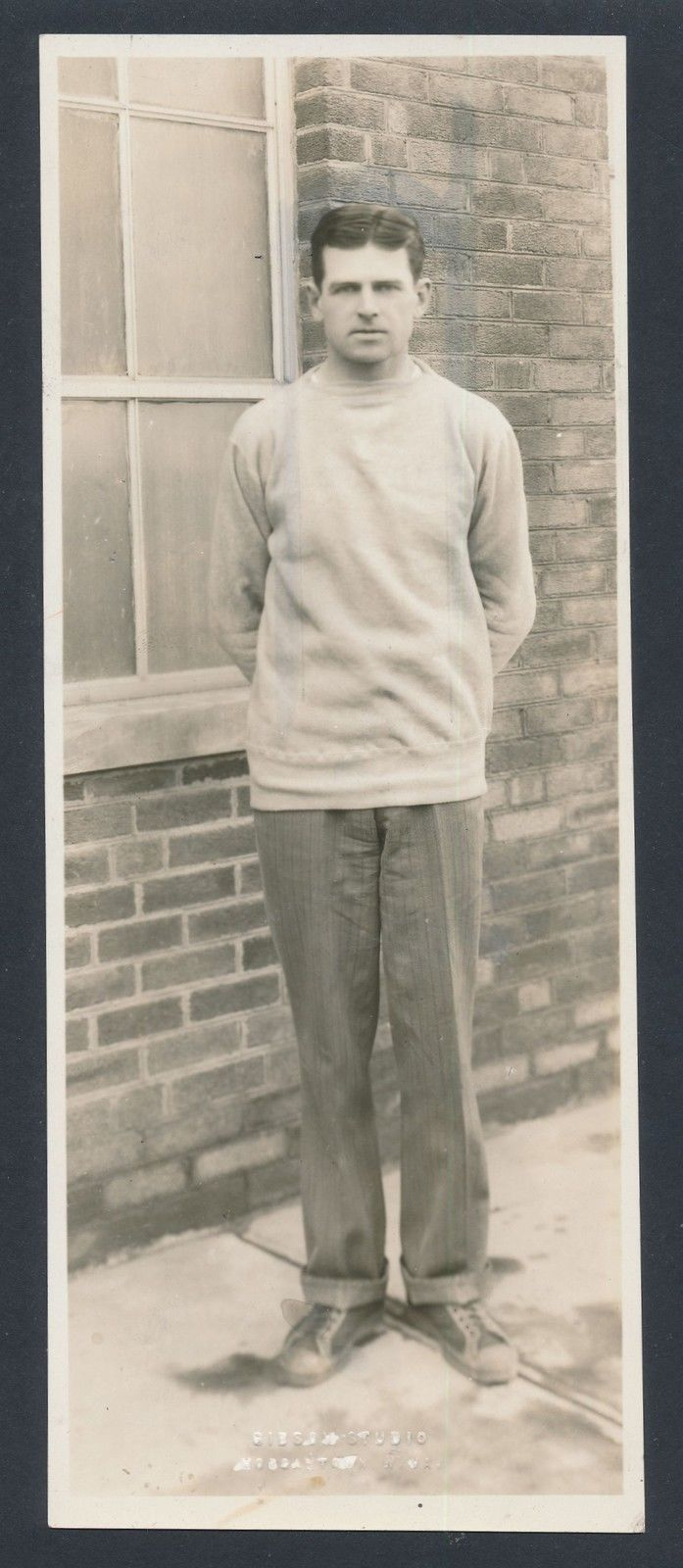

Personal information
- Born: September 22, 1891 Fosston, Minnesota, U.S.
- Died: December 7, 1965 (aged 74) Crookston, Minnesota, U.S.
- Listed height: 5 ft 11 in (1.80 m)
- Listed weight: 135 lb (61 kg)

Career information
- High school: Fosston (Fosston, Minnesota)
- College: University of Minnesota (1913–1917)
- Position: Forward

Career history

Coaching
- 1919–1933: University of West Virginia

Career highlights
- Consensus All-American (1917); All-Big Ten (1917)

Francis Herbert "Dobie" Stadsvold (September 22, 1891 – December 7, 1965) was an American college basketball player, coach, and lawyer. As a forward for the Minnesota Golden Gophers between 1913–14 and 1916–17, he was named a consensus All-American in 1916–17. He later served as the head basketball coach at West Virginia University, leading the Mountaineers from 1919–20 through 1932–33 and compiling an overall record of 149–133. While still a Minnesota undergraduate, Stadsvold coached his hometown Fosston high school team to the championship of the first Minnesota state high school basketball tournament in 1913. After his coaching career, he practiced law in Minnesota and served as the Polk County attorney from 1935 to 1962.

== Early life ==
Stadsvold was born on September 22, 1891, in Fosston, Minnesota, to Sever and Millie Stadsvold. He graduated from Fosston High School in 1911 and enrolled at the University of Minnesota.

== 1913 state championship ==
In 1913, while a sophomore at Minnesota, Stadsvold was invited to coach the Fosston High School team for the first Minnesota state high school basketball tournament, an invitational event held at Carleton College in Northfield. The team, which had no regular coach and practiced without a gymnasium, defeated Mountain Lake 29–27 in the final to win the inaugural state championship. The squad included Larry Rue, later a foreign correspondent for the Chicago Tribune.

== Playing career ==
Stadsvold was a regular for the Golden Gophers for three seasons, earning a letter each year and serving as team captain under coach Dr. Louis J. Cooke. As a senior in 1917 he was named to the Western Conference all-conference team and chosen its honorary captain; that season Minnesota tied Illinois for the conference championship with a 10–2 record. He was recognized as a consensus All-American for the 1916–17 season.

Listed at just 135 pounds, Stadsvold was known for his ball handling, and contemporary newspaper accounts credited him with helping to popularize the dribble as an offensive skill at a time when teams advanced the ball chiefly by passing. Those accounts also reported that he sometimes wore shoulder pads to protect an injury and that he once scored seven field goals in a game against Illinois while playing with one arm in a sling.

After graduating with a degree in law in 1917, Stadsvold served in the United States Army artillery during World War I.

== Coaching career ==
On the recommendation of his former coach Louis Cooke, Stadsvold was hired as head basketball coach at West Virginia University. He led the Mountaineers from the 1919–20 season through 1932–33, compiling an overall record of 149–133. By a later account, he resigned after the 1932–33 season because the Great Depression had left no funds to pay coaching salaries.

== Head coaching record ==
Record table
Season	Team	Overall	Conference	Standing	Postseason
West Virginia Mountaineers (Independent) (1919–1932)
1919–20	West Virginia	12–10			
1920–21	West Virginia	11–9			
1921–22	West Virginia	8–13			
1922–23	West Virginia	12–7			
1923–24	West Virginia	14–2			
1924–25	West Virginia	6–11			
1925–26	West Virginia	10–11			
1926–27	West Virginia	10–8			
1927–28	West Virginia	13–7			
1928–29	West Virginia	16–6			
1929–30	West Virginia	11–10			
1930–31	West Virginia	9–11			
1931–32	West Virginia	7–14			
West Virginia Mountaineers (Eastern Intercollegiate Conference) (1932–1933)
1932–33	West Virginia	10–14	1–7	5th	
West Virginia:		149–133 (.528)	1–7 (.125)		
Total:		149–133 (.528)			
