= Orson Kinney =

American basketball player and coach (1894–1966)

Personal information
- Born: December 17, 1894 Yonkers, New York, U.S.
- Died: January 4, 1966 (aged 71) Dayton, Ohio, U.S.

Career information
- College: Yale (1914–1918)
- Position: Forward

Career history

Coaching
- 1920–1921: Fordham
- 1921–1922: Yale

Career highlights
- Helms All-American (1917); First-team all-EIBL (1917); 2× second-team all-EIBL (1915, 1916)

Orson Alonzo Kinney (December 12, 1894 – January 4, 1966) was an American basketball player and coach known for his collegiate playing career at Yale University in the 1910s. He led the Bulldogs to two Eastern Intercollegiate Basketball League (EIBL) championships in 1914–15 and 1916–17 and led the league in scoring in 1915–16 and 1916–17. As a junior in 1916–17 Kinney was named an All-American by the Helms Athletic Foundation. Orson Kinney was also the younger brother of Gilmore Kinney, another Yale basketball star who was the collegiate national player of the year in 1906–07.

Kinney became the head coach of two programs following graduation – Fordham University and Yale University. While coaching Fordham he also played the Crescent Athletic Club.

== Head coaching record ==
Record table
Season	Team	Overall	Conference	Standing	Postseason
Fordham Rams (Independent) (1920–1921)
1920–21	Fordham	15–9			
Fordham:		15–9 (.625)			
Yale Bulldogs (Eastern Intercollegiate Basketball League) (1921–1922)
1921–22	Yale	6–21	1–9	6th	
Yale:		6–21 (.222)	1–9 (.100)		
Total:		21–30 (.412)			
