= Harry Young (American football) =

American football, basketball, and baseball player and coach (1893–1977)

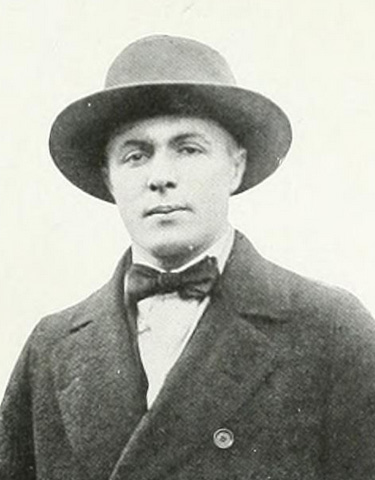
- Young pictured in The Colonial Echo 1918, William & Mary yearbook

Biographical details
- Born: March 8, 1893; Charleston, West Virginia, U.S.
- Died: September 24, 1977 (aged 84); Richmond, Virginia, U.S.

Playing career

Football
- 1910–1911: Marshall
- 1912: Michigan (freshmen)
- 1913–1916: Washington and Lee

Basketball
- 1913–1917: Washington and Lee

Baseball
- c. 1911: Marshall
- 1914–1917: Washington and Lee
- Position: Halfback (football)

Coaching career (HC unless noted)

Football
- 1917: William & Mary

Basketball
- 1917–1918: William & Mary
- 1932–1939: Washington and Lee
- 1945–1946: Washington and Lee

Baseball
- 1929–1930: William & Mary

Head coaching record
- Overall: 3–5 (football)
- College Football Hall of Fame; Inducted in 1958 (profile)

Harry Killenger "Cy" Young (March 8, 1893 – September 24, 1977) was an American football, basketball, and baseball player and coach. He played college football as a halfback at Marshall College—now known as Marshall University from 1910 to 1911 and Washington and Lee University from 1913 to 1916. Young served as the head football coach at the College of William & Mary for one season, in 1917, compiling a record of 3–5. He was inducted into the College Football Hall of Fame as a player in 1958.

== Early life and playing career ==
A native of Charleston, West Virginia, attended three colleges and participated in the athletic programs of all three. In 1910–11, Young matriculated to Marshall College (now Marshall University), where he played varsity football, track and field, and baseball. He attended the University of Michigan where he played for the junior varsity football team for one year, and then transferred to Washington & Lee University, where he was a four-sport player, lettering 16 times. During his football career at Washington and Lee, Young led the team in scoring four straight years and served as captain of the team in 1916. At that time, Washington and Lee played such powerhouses as Army, Navy, Georgia Tech, Indiana, North Carolina and Cornell.

Young's basketball career equaled his football, playing four years at Washington and Lee, leading the team in scoring three of the four years, and serving as captain in 1915. The Helms Foundation selected him as an All-American in 1917. Young's baseball career also covered a four-year period, in which he led the team in runs scored and in stolen bases each of the four years. He was captain of the 1917 team. Young's track record also covered a span of four years where he ran the 100 and 220-yard dashes. He only lost one race during his college career and held many of the school's track records some of which still stand.

== Coaching career ==
Young was the head football coach at the College of William & Mary for one season, guiding the 1917 William & Mary Indians football team to a record of 3–5. He was also head coach for the William & Mary Tribe men's basketball team for the 1917–18 season, leading his team to a mark of 6–11.

Young served in the United States Army in France during World War I. After the war, he worked in the lumber business in Helena, Arkansas. He returned to coaching in 1928, when he was appointed freshman coach at William and Mary. He retired as Washington and Lee Alumni Secretary in 1958.

== Honors and death ==
Young was selected to the College Football Hall of Fame in 1958 and to the West Virginia Sportswriters Hall of Fame in 1966. He is also an inductee of the Marshall University and Washington & Lee University halls of fame. In 1976, Young was also inducted into the Virginia Sports Hall of Fame.

Young died on September 24, 1977, at a hospital in Richmond, Virginia.

== Head coaching record ==
=== Football ===
Year	Team	Overall	Conference	Standing	Bowl/playoffs
William & Mary Indians (Eastern Virginia Intercollegiate Athletic Association / South Atlantic Intercollegiate Athletic Association) (1917)
1917	William & Mary	3–5	2–4 / 0–3	3rd / 11th	
William & Mary:		3–5	2–5		
Total:		3–5			
