= Ray Woods =

American basketball player (1895–1965)

Personal information
- Born: February 2, 1895
- Died: October 1965 (aged 70)

Career information
- High school: Evanston (Evanston, Illinois)
- College: Illinois (1914–1917)
- Position: Guard

Career highlights
- Helms National Player of the Year (1917); 3× Helms All-American (1915–1917); 3× First-team All-Big Ten (1915–1917); Jersey retired by the University of Illinois

Ray James Woods (February 2, 1895 – October 1965) was an American college basketball standout for Illinois in the 1910s. A guard, Woods helped lead the Fighting Illini to two Big Ten Conference championships in 1915 and 1917, with the former being an undefeated 16–0 season that resulted in a retroactive national championship. In all three seasons he played at the school, Woods was named an All-American and was honored as the Helms Foundation National Player of the Year as a senior in 1916–17. He was Illinois' first-ever All-American in basketball and teamed up with his brother, Ralf (a forward), in guiding the school to their first era of basketball dominance.

== Honors ==
- 1917 – Helms National Player of the Year
- 1915, 1916, 1917 – First Team All-American
- 1915, 1916, 1917 – First-team All-Big Ten
- 2004 – Elected to the "Illini Men's Basketball All-Century Team"
- September 13, 2008 – Honored jersey which hangs in the State Farm Center to show regard for being the most decorated basketball players in the University of Illinois' history.

== Statistics ==
Season	Games	Points	PPG	Big Ten record	Overall record	Postseason
1914–15	16	58	3.6	12–0	16–0	Helms Foundation National Champions; Premo-Porretta National Champions; Big Ten Conference Champions
1915–16	16	52	3.25	9–3	13–3	–
1916–17	16	38	2.4	10–2	13–3	Big Ten Conference Champions
Totals	48	148	3.1	31–5	42–6	
