= Ralph Jones =

American football and basketball coach

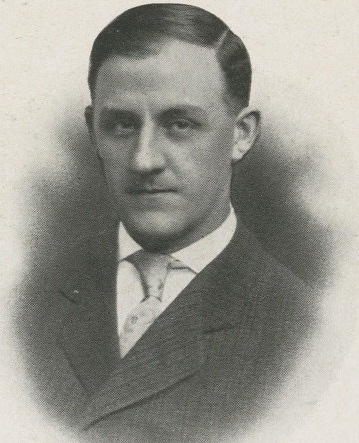

Biographical details
- Born: September 22, 1880; Marion County, Indiana, U.S.
- Died: July 26, 1951 (aged 70); Boulder, Colorado, U.S.

Playing career

Football
- 1900s?: Wabash
- 1921: Hammond Pros

Coaching career (HC unless noted)

Football
- 1908: Wabash
- 1913–1919: Illinois (assistant)
- 1920–1929: Lake Forest Academy (IL)
- 1930–1932: Chicago Bears
- 1933–1948: Lake Forest

Basketball
- 1899–1903: Shortridge HS (IL)
- 1903–1904: Butler
- 1904–1909: Crawfordsville HS (IN)
- 1904–1909: Wabash
- 1909–1912: Purdue
- 1912–1920: Illinois
- 1920–1930: Lake Forest Academy (IL)
- 1933–1939: Lake Forest
- 1945–1946: Lake Forest

Baseball
- 1908–1909: Wabash

Head coaching record
- Overall: 54–37–10 (college football); 232–106 (college basketball); 32–15 (college baseball); 24–10–7 (NFL)

Accomplishments and honors

Championships
- Football; 1 NFL (1932); 2 ICC (1938, 1940) Basketball; Helms National (1915); 4 Western Conference (1911, 1912, 1915, 1917)

Ralph Robert "Curley" Jones (September 22, 1880 – July 26, 1951) was an American football and basketball coach. He also served as the head coach for the Chicago Bears of the National Football League (NFL) from 1930 to 1932, leading them to the 1932 NFL championship. He played in one game for the Hammond Pros in 1921 as a 41-year-old NFL rookie.

== Early years ==
=== State of Indiana ===
Jones was an integral part of the development of high school basketball in Indiana and a successful college coach at Purdue and Illinois. He was the recipient of the Indiana Basketball Hall of Fame's inaugural Centennial Award on November 27, 2010. It is believed that Jones was the first high school basketball coach in the state of Indiana. While still a high school student, he organized the team at Indianapolis Shortridge High School in 1899—the first high school team in Indiana. Jones led the Indianapolis YMCA to statewide prominence, and then led the Crawfordsville YMCA, both of which claimed state YMCA championships under his guidance. Due to his success with YMCA-based leagues, Butler University contracted Jones to coach basketball for the 1903–04 season. This was the first "official" head coaching job in the long and successful career Jones would continue for the next 30 years.

Jones continued his coaching at Crawfordsville, this time at the local high school and additionally took on the head coaching duties of Wabash College. His teams at both institutions featured hall of fame inductees Ward "Piggy" Lambert, Pete Vaughn and David Glascock, with the 1906–07 Crawfordsville squad finishing 12–0 (prior to the first high school state tournament) and his 1907–08 Wabash team going 24–0. While at Wabash, his team was selected from only 300 students, yet in five years lost only four games, twice to Notre Dame and once to Purdue. Known as the "Little Giants", Jones's Wabash teams compiled a record of 75–6 and defeated teams from much larger institutions, including Illinois, Purdue, Indiana, Minnesota and Notre Dame. During this same time period, Jones's Crawfordsville High School teams lost only one game.

=== Purdue University ===
Jones moved on to Purdue in 1910, beginning a three-year tenure that resulted in a 32–9 record and the first two Big Nine championships in program history (1911 and 1912). He also mentored the first All-American in Purdue basketball history, as Dave Charters garnered consensus honors in both 1910 and 1911.

=== University of Illinois ===
After his three seasons at Purdue, Jones headed to the University of Illinois. During his tenure at Illinois, Jones took a mediocre team and within two years established a dominant system that led to a 16–0 record in 1914–15. His 1914–15 team was retroactively named the national champion by the Helms Athletic Foundation and was retroactively listed as the top team of the season by the Premo-Porretta Power Poll. Jones's basketball teams at Illinois won 85 games and lost 34. He also won two Big Ten or "Big Nine" titles. Jones also was the athletic director for two years as well as being the assistant football coach to Bob Zuppke from 1913 through 1919.

After Jones left Illinois, he went to Lake Forest Academy in Lake Forest, Illinois. He was there for 10 years coaching both basketball and football. His football teams won 76 games and lost only six games in his 10 years. During this tenure, his basketball teams had a record of 94–9.

== Chicago Bears ==
After Bears owner George Halas retired as player-coach in 1930, he hired Jones to take over his team as head coach. Even though Jones led the team to a 24–10–7 record, due to the economic depression which was affecting every business across the United States, the financial health of the franchise began to suffer. With many people out of work, fewer and fewer individuals could pay for the cost of a ticket to attend a Bears game. Consequently, even though the team won the NFL championship in 1932, by the end of the season the franchise had lost approximately $18,000. Part-owner Dutch Sternaman sold his half of the team to Halas, To save the cost of a head coach's salary, Halas named himself head coach. During his tenure with the Bears, Jones lined the quarterback directly under center, the first time this had been done. Next, he spaced out the offensive line and devised blocking schemes that would open holes in the defense. He refined the T formation by introducing wide ends and a halfback in motion. While Jones was head coach, Bronko Nagurski made his NFL debut as a member of the Chicago Bears. His .706 winning percentage is the best in Bears history.

During his time at Lake Forest College Jones tinkered with simple options on the basic T formation. Many coaches were searching for answers to an easy-to-teach formation that was also not easy to defend. Jones approached Halas with various diagrammed options. Not until Clark Shaughnessy, head coach at the University of Chicago, approached Halas with very complex formations in 1935 did the T become effective. Many coaches contributed to the success of the T-formation that swept college and pro football in 1940. Shaughnessy's Stanford University team went 10–0 and defeated Nebraska in the Rose Bowl with his elaborate T-formation. Weeks later, Halas's Bears defeated the Washington Redskins 73–0 with the same system. Jones left the Bears to become athletic director at Lake Forest College.

All told, Jones tallied 404 wins in his coaching career for a winning record of better than 83 percent. He also mentored nine college All-Americans.

Basketball Hall of Fame inductee Ward Lambert dedicated his 1932 book, Practical Basketball, to "Ralph Jones, my coach."

== Personal life ==
Jones married Florence C. Pyle in 1903 and remained with her until his death, a 48-year marriage. Jones wrote his first published book entitled, "Basketball from a Coaching Standpoint", published by Flanigan-Pearson Company, Printers and released in 1916. He also co-wrote, "The Modern "T" Formation with Man-in-motion" with Clark Daniel Shaughnessy and George Halas. This book was related to football and released in 1946.

== Head coaching record ==
=== High school basketball ===
School	Season	Record	Conference record	Place	Postseason
Shortridge High School	1899–1900	5–2			
Shortridge High School	1900–01	3–5			
Shortridge High School	1901–02	?			
Shortridge High School	1902–03	?			
Shortridge	1899–1903	8–7	–	–	
Crawfordsville HS	1903–04	13–2			mythical State champions
Crawfordsville HS	1904–05	4–3			mythical State champions
Crawfordsville HS	1905–06	9–6			
Crawfordsville HS	1906–07	12–0			mythical State champions
Crawfordsville HS	1907–08	10–5			
Crawfordsville HS	1908–09	17–1			
Crawfordsville HS	1904–1909	65–17	–	–	
Lake Forest Academy	1920–21				
Lake Forest Academy	1921–22				
Lake Forest Academy	1922–23				
Lake Forest Academy	1923–24				
Lake Forest Academy	1924–25				
Lake Forest Academy	1925–26				
Lake Forest Academy	1926–27				
Lake Forest Academy	1927–28				
Lake Forest Academy	1928–29				
Lake Forest Academy	1929–30				
Lake Forest Academy	1920–1930	94–9	–	–	

=== College basketball ===
Record table
Season	Team	Overall	Conference	Standing	Postseason
Butler Christians (Independent) (1903–1904)
1903–04	Butler	2–2			
Butler:		2–2			
Wabash Little Giants (Independent) (1904–1909)
1904–05	Wabash	8–0			
1905–06	Wabash	17–1			
1906–07	Wabash	17–2			
1907–08	Wabash	24–0			
1908–09	Wabash	9–3			
Wabash:		75–6			
Purdue Boilermakers (Western Conference) (1909–1912)
1909–10	Purdue	8–5	5–5	5th	
1910–11	Purdue	12–4	8–4	T–1st	
1911–12	Purdue	12–0	10–0	1st	
Purdue:		32–9	23–9		
Illinois Fighting Illini (Western Conference / Big Ten Conference) (1912–1920)
1912–13	Illinois	10–6	7–6	5th	
1913–14	Illinois	9–4	7–3	3rd	
1914–15	Illinois	16–0	12–0	1st	Helms national championship
1915–16	Illinois	13–3	9–3	T–2nd	
1916–17	Illinois	13–3	10–2	T–1st	
1917–18	Illinois	9–6	6–6	T–4th	
1918–19	Illinois	6–8	5–7	5th	
1919–20	Illinois	9–4	8–4	3rd	
Illinois:		85–34	64–31		
Lake Forest Foresters (Independent) (1933–1939)
1933–34	Lake Forest	7–7			
1934–35	Lake Forest	2–10			
1935–36	Lake Forest	8–6			
1936–37	Lake Forest	2–12			
1937–38	Lake Forest	9–7			
1938–39	Lake Forest	8–5			
Lake Forest Foresters (Independent) (1945–1946)
1945–46	Lake Forest	2–8			
Lake Forest:		38–55			
Total:		232–106			
National champion Postseason invitational champion Conference regular season champion Conference regular season and conference tournament champion Division regular season champion Division regular season and conference tournament champion Conference tournament champion

=== College football ===
Year	Team	Overall	Conference	Standing	Bowl/playoffs
Wabash Little Giants (Independent) (1908)
1908	Wabash	2–6			
Wabash:		2–6			
Lake Forest Foresters (Illinois Intercollegiate Athletic Conference) (1933–1937)
1933	Lake Forest	3–3–1	2–1	12th	
1934	Lake Forest	3–4–1	0–4	20th	
1935	Lake Forest	3–4	0–1	18th	
1936	Lake Forest	4–2–1	2–1	T–5th	
1937	Lake Forest	3–1–2	1–1–1	T–11th	
Lake Forest Foresters (Illinois College Conference) (1938–1945)
1938	Lake Forest	7–0	4–0	T–1st	
1939	Lake Forest	5–2	2–2	T–7th	
1940	Lake Forest	6–0–1	3–0	T–1st	
1941	Lake Forest	5–1–2	2–1–1	T–4th	
1942	Lake Forest	2–4–1	0–3	T–7th	
1943	No team—World War II				
1944	No team—World War II				
1945	No team—World War II				
Lake Forest Foresters (College Conference of Illinois) (1946–1948)
1946	Lake Forest	3–3	3–1	T–2nd	
1947	Lake Forest	3–4–1	2–2–1	T–5th	
1948	Lake Forest	5–3	4–1	T–2nd	
Lake Forest:		52–31–10	25–18–3		
Total:		54–37–10			
National championship Conference title Conference division title or championship game berth

=== NFL ===
One-Game Playoff Berth

NFL coaching statistics
Season	Team	Regular season				Postseason results
Season	Team	Finish	W	L	T	Postseason results
1930	Chicago Bears	3rd	9	4	1	
1931	Chicago Bears	3rd	8	5	0	
1932	Chicago Bears	1st^{1}	7	1	6^{2}	Named NFL champions^{1}
Total			24	10	7	

^{1} The result of the 1932 NFL Playoff Game to determine the NFL champion between the Chicago Bears and the Portsmouth Spartans counted in the regular season standings.
^{2} Prior to the 1972 season ties did not count in the NFL Standings therefore the Bears (6–1–6) and the Spartans (6–1–4) were considered tied atop the standings ahead of the Packers (10–3–1)
