= Walter Meanwell =

British basketball coach

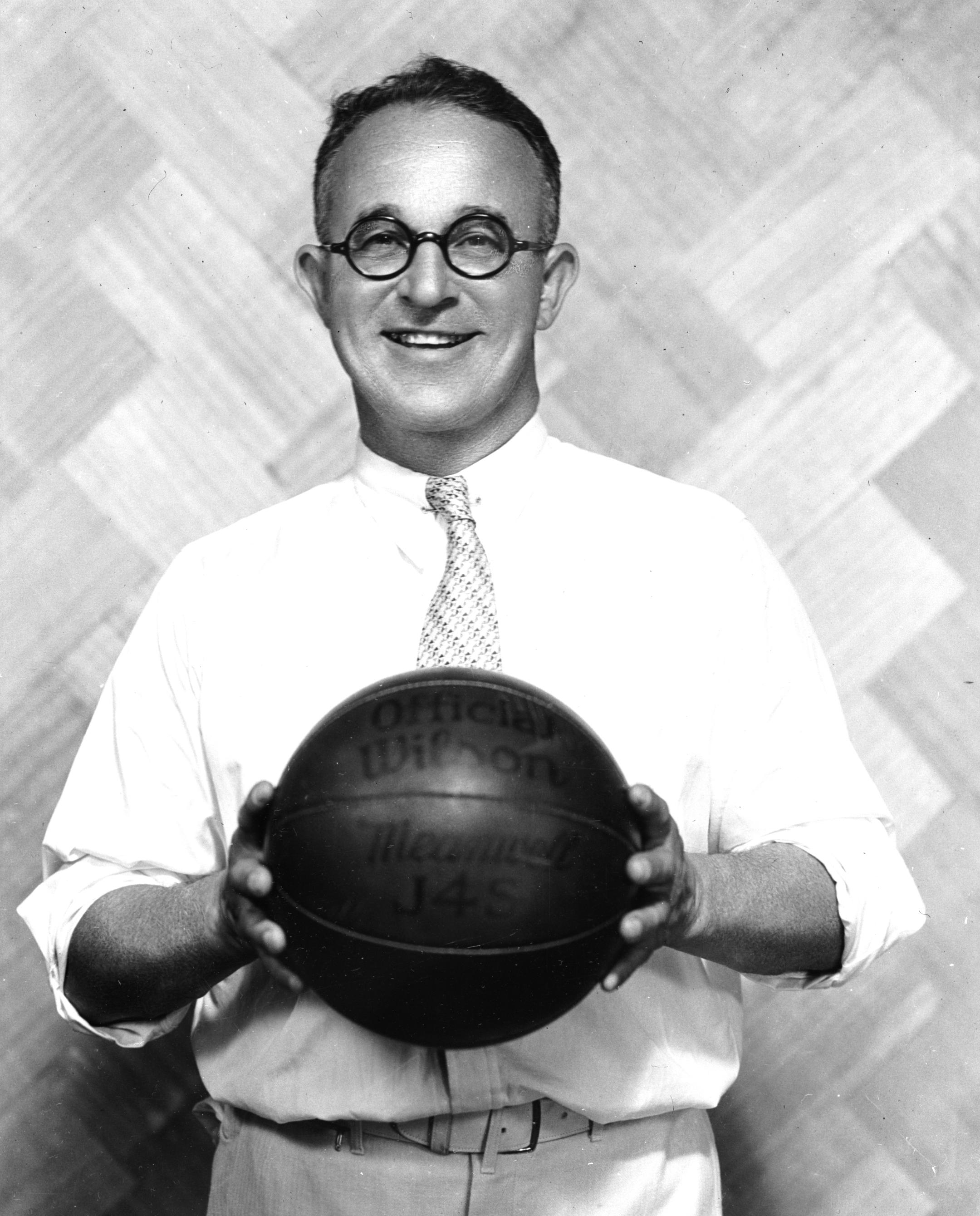
- University of Wisconsin photo

Biographical details
- Born: 26 January 1884; Leeds, England
- Died: 2 December 1953 (aged 69); Madison, Wisconsin, U.S.

Coaching career (HC unless noted)
- 1911–1917: Wisconsin
- 1917–1918: Missouri
- 1919–1920: Missouri
- 1920–1934: Wisconsin

Administrative career (AD unless noted)
- 1919–1920: Missouri
- 1933–1935: Wisconsin

Head coaching record
- Overall: 280–101

Accomplishments and honors

Championships
- 3 Helms National (1912, 1914, 1916); 2 MVC (1918, 1920); 8 Western Conference / Big Ten (1912–1914, 1916, 1921, 1923, 1924, 1929)
- Basketball Hall of Fame; Inducted in 1959 (profile)
- College Basketball Hall of Fame; Inducted in 2006

Walter E. Meanwell (26 January 1884 – 2 December 1953) was an English college men's basketball coach in the 1910s, 1920s and 1930s. The Leeds, England native coached in the U.S. for the University of Wisconsin–Madison (1911–1917, 1920–1934) and the University of Missouri (1918–1920) to an overall record of 290–101.

Meanwell became the fourth basketball coach in University of Wisconsin–Madison history in 1911. After earning a doctorate degree in 1915, he was nicknamed "Doc" or "Little Doc" (due to his 5'6" frame). During World War I era, he served in the United States Army Medical Corps and became a captain. After a two-year stint at University of Missouri, Meanwell was back at Wisconsin. The Badgers won or shared four Big Ten titles under his guidance (1921, 1923–24, 1929). His 1912, 1914, and 1916 Wisconsin teams were retroactively named national champions by the Helms Athletic Foundation and were retroactively ranked as the top teams for those respective seasons by the Premo-Porretta Power Poll. Meanwell taught a style of game that featured short passing, crisscross dribbles and a tight zone defense. In 1934 he retired from coaching and practiced medicine in Madison, Wisconsin, until his death. He was inducted to the Naismith Memorial Basketball Hall of Fame as a coach in 1959.

== Head coaching record ==
Record table
Season	Team	Overall	Conference	Standing	Postseason
Wisconsin Badgers (Western Conference) (1911–1917)
1911–12	Wisconsin	15–0	12–0	1st	Helms National Champions
1912–13	Wisconsin	14–1	11–1	1st	
1913–14	Wisconsin	15–0	12–0	1st	Helms National Champions
1914–15	Wisconsin	13–4	8–4	3rd	
1915–16	Wisconsin	20–1	11–1	1st	Helms National Champions
1916–17	Wisconsin	15–3	9–3	4th	
Missouri Tigers (Missouri Valley Conference) (1917–1918)
1917–18	Missouri	17–1	15–1	1st	
Missouri Tigers (Missouri Valley Conference) (1919–1920)
1919–20	Missouri	17–1	17–1	1st	
Missouri:		34–2	32–2		
Wisconsin Badgers (Big Ten Conference) (1920–1934)
1920–21	Wisconsin	13–4	8–4	T–1st	
1921–22	Wisconsin	14–5	8–4	2nd	
1922–23	Wisconsin	12–3	11–1	T–1st	
1923–24	Wisconsin	11–5	8–4	T–1st	
1924–25	Wisconsin	6–11	3–9	9th	
1925–26	Wisconsin	8–9	4–8	T–8th	
1926–27	Wisconsin	10–7	7–5	T–4th	
1927–28	Wisconsin	13–4	9–3	T–3rd	
1928–29	Wisconsin	15–2	10–2	T–1st	
1929–30	Wisconsin	15–2	8–2	2nd	
1930–31	Wisconsin	8–9	4–8	T–7th	
1931–32	Wisconsin	8–10	3–9	T–8th	
1932–33	Wisconsin	7–13	4–8	8th	
1933–34	Wisconsin	14–6	8–4	T–2nd	
Wisconsin:		246–99	158–80		
Total:		280–101			
National champion Postseason invitational champion Conference regular season champion Conference regular season and conference tournament champion Division regular season champion Division regular season and conference tournament champion Conference tournament champion
