= List of Big Ten Conference men's basketball regular season champions =

== Champions by year ==
Below is a list of Big Ten Conference men's basketball regular season champions. There are no tie breakers within the Big Ten Conference. Thus, if two or more teams tie atop the standing at the end of the season, they both win a shared championship.

Year	Champion	B1G Record	National Championship	Notes
1906	Minnesota	6–1		
1907	Chicago; Minnesota; Wisconsin	6–2	Helms Athletic Foundation (Chicago)	Indiana did not play during the season
1908	Chicago; Wisconsin	7–1	Chicago (Postseason playoff, Helms Athletic Foundation)	Indiana did not play during the season
1909	Chicago	12–0	Helms Athletic Foundation (Chicago)	Iowa began conference play in basketball
1910	Chicago	9–3		
1911	Minnesota; Purdue	8–4		
1912	Purdue; Wisconsin	10–0; 12–0	Helms Athletic Foundation (Wisconsin)	
1913	Wisconsin	11–1		Ohio State joined conference
1914	Wisconsin	12–0	Helms Athletic Foundation (Wisconsin)	
1915	Illinois	12–0	Helms Athletic Foundation (Illinois)	
1916	Wisconsin	11–1	Helms Athletic Foundation (Wisconsin)	
1917	Illinois; Minnesota	10–2		
1918	Wisconsin	9–3		Michigan returned to the Big Ten at the start of the season
1919	Minnesota	10–0	Helms Athletic Foundation (Minnesota)	
1920	Chicago	10–2		
1921	Michigan; Purdue; Wisconsin	8–4		
1922	Purdue	8–1		
1923	Iowa; Wisconsin	11–1		
1924	Chicago; Illinois; Wisconsin	8–4		
1925	Ohio State	11–1		
1926	Indiana; Iowa; Michigan; Purdue	8–4		
1927	Michigan	10–2		
1928	Indiana; Purdue	10–2		
1929	Michigan; Wisconsin	10–2		
1930	Purdue	10–0		Iowa did not play basketball this season
1931	Northwestern	11–1	Helms Athletic Foundation (Northwestern)	
1932	Purdue	11–1	Helms Athletic Foundation (Purdue)	
1933	Northwestern; Ohio State	10–2		
1934	Purdue	10–2		
1935	Illinois; Purdue; Wisconsin	9–3		
1936	Indiana; Purdue	11–1		
1937	Illinois; Minnesota	10–2		
1938	Purdue	10–2		
1939	Ohio State	10–2		First National Championship Tournament conducted by the National Association of Basketball Coaches
1940	Purdue	10–2	NCAA (Indiana)	First NCAA Tournament
1941	Wisconsin	11–1	Helms Athletic Foundation; NCAA (Wisconsin)	
1942	Illinois	13–2		
1943	Illinois	12–0		
1944	Ohio State	10–2		
1945	Iowa	11–1		Chicago did not play during this season
1946	Ohio State	10–2		
1947	Wisconsin	9–3		First season without University of Chicago in the conference
1948	Michigan	10–2		
1949	Illinois	10–2		
1950	Ohio State	11–1		
1951	Illinois	13–1		Michigan State joined conference
1952	Illinois	12–2		
1953	Indiana	17–1	Helms Athletic Foundation; NCAA (Indiana)	
1954	Indiana	12–2		
1955	Iowa	11–3		
1956	Iowa	13–1		
1957	Indiana; Michigan State	10–4		
1958	Indiana	10–4		
1959	Michigan State	12–2		
1960	Ohio State	13–1	Helms Athletic Foundation; NCAA (Ohio State)	
1961	Ohio State	14–0		
1962	Ohio State	13–1		
1963	Illinois; Ohio State	11–3		
1964	Michigan; Ohio State	11–3		
1965	Michigan	13–1		
1966	Michigan	11–3		
1967	Indiana; Michigan State	10–4		
1968	Iowa; Ohio State	10–4		
1969	Purdue	13–1		
1970	Iowa	14–0		
1971	Ohio State	13–1		
1972	Minnesota	11–3		
1973	Indiana	11–3		
1974	Indiana; Michigan	12–2		
1975	Indiana	18–0		
1976	Indiana	18–0	Helms Athletic Foundation; NCAA (Indiana)	
1977	Michigan	16–2		
1978	Michigan State	15–3		
1979	Iowa; Michigan State; Purdue	13–5	Helms Athletic Foundation; NCAA (Michigan State)	
1980	Indiana	13–5		
1981	Indiana	14–4	Helms Athletic Foundation; NCAA (Indiana)	
1982	Minnesota	14–4		Final year Helms Athletic Foundation selected a National Champion
1983	Indiana	13–5		
1984	Illinois; Purdue	15–3		
1985	Michigan	16–2		
1986	Michigan	14–4		
1987	Indiana; Purdue	15–3	NCAA (Indiana)	
1988	Purdue	16–2		
1989	Indiana	15–3	NCAA (Michigan)	
1990	Michigan State	15–3		
1991	Indiana; Ohio State	15–3		
1992	Ohio State	15–3		
1993	Indiana	17–1		Penn State joined conference
1994	Purdue	14–4		
1995	Purdue	15–3		
1996	Purdue	6–12 (Note: Adjusted from 15–3, (forfeit 9 conference wins) due to NCAA rule violations)		Purdue retained its Big Ten title despite NCAA adjustments to its win–loss record.
1997	Vacated	16–2		Minnesota vacated its title in 1997 due to NCAA sanctions.
1998	Illinois; Michigan State	13–3		
1999	Michigan State	15–1		
2000	Michigan State	13–3	NCAA (Michigan State)	Ohio State vacated its share of the title in 2000 due to NCAA sanctions.
2001	Illinois; Michigan State	13–3		
2002	Illinois; Indiana; Wisconsin	11–5		Ohio State vacated its share of the title in 2002 due to NCAA sanctions.
2003	Wisconsin	12–4		
2004	Illinois	13–3		
2005	Illinois	15–1		
2006	Ohio State	12–4		
2007	Ohio State	15–1		
2008	Wisconsin	16–2		
2009	Michigan State	15–3		
2010	Michigan State; Ohio State; Purdue	14–4		
2011	Ohio State	16–2		
2012	Michigan; Michigan State; Ohio State	13–5		Nebraska joined conference
2013	Indiana	14–4		
2014	Michigan	15–3		
2015	Wisconsin	16–2		Rutgers and Maryland joined conference
2016	Indiana	15–3		
2017	Purdue	14–4		
2018	Michigan State	16–2		
2019	Michigan State; Purdue	16–4		Conference began using a 20-game conference schedule.
2020	Maryland; Michigan State; Wisconsin	14–6		Postseason tournaments were canceled due to the COVID-19 pandemic.
2021	Michigan	14–3		
2022	Illinois; Wisconsin	15–5		
2023	Purdue	15–5		
2024	Purdue	17–3		
2025	Michigan State	17–3		Oregon, UCLA, USC, and Washington joined conference
2026	Michigan	19–1	NCAA (Michigan)	

== Championships by school ==
Team	Big Ten titles	Outright Big Ten titles	Winning years
Purdue	26	14	1911, 1912, 1921, **1922**, 1926, 1928, **1930**, **1932**, **1934**, 1935, 1936, **1938**, **1940**, **1969**, 1979, 1984, 1987, **1988**, **1994**, **1995**, **1996**, 2010, **2017**, 2019, **2023**, **2024**
Indiana	22	13	1926, 1928, 1936, **1953**, **1954**, 1957, **1958**, 1967, **1973**, 1974, **1975**, **1976**, **1980**, **1981**, **1983**, 1987, **1989**, 1991, **1993**, 2002, **2013**, **2016**
Ohio State	20†	14	**1925**, 1933, **1939**, **1944**, **1946**, **1950**, **1960**, **1961**, **1962**, 1963, 1964, 1968, **1971**, 1991, **1992**, **2006**, **2007**, 2010, **2011**, 2012
Wisconsin	20	9	1907, 1908, 1912, **1913**, **1914**, **1916**, **1918**, 1921, 1923, 1924, 1929, 1935, **1941**, **1947**, 2002, **2003**, **2008**, **2015**, 2020, 2022
Illinois	18	8	**1915**, 1917, 1924, 1935, 1937, **1942**, **1943**, **1949**, **1951**, **1952**, 1963, 1984, 1998, 2001, 2002, **2004**, **2005**, 2022
Michigan State	17	8	1957, **1959**, 1967, **1978**, 1979, **1990**, 1998, **1999**, **2000**, 2001, **2009**, 2010, 2012, **2018**, 2019, 2020, **2025**
Michigan	16	10	1921, 1926, **1927**, 1929, **1948**, 1964, **1965**, **1966**, 1974, **1977**, **1985**, **1986**, 2012, **2014**, **2021**, **2026**
Iowa	8	4	1923, 1926, **1945**, **1955**, **1956**, 1968, **1970**, 1979
Minnesota	8^	4^	**1906**, 1907, 1911, 1917, **1919**, 1937, **1972**, **1982**
Chicago	6	3	1907, 1908, **1909**, **1910**, **1920**, 1924
Northwestern	2	1	**1931**, 1933
Maryland	1	0	2020
Penn State	0	0	
Nebraska	0	0	
Rutgers	0	0	
Oregon	0	0	
UCLA	0	0	
USC	0	0	
Washington	0	0	

^ Due to an academic scandal, Minnesota vacated its 1997 Big Ten Conference regular season title.

† Due to NCAA sanctions, Ohio State vacated its shares of the 2000 and 2002 Big Ten Conference regular season titles.

Italics indicates a team no longer competing in the Big Ten.

Bold indicates an outright Big Ten Championship.

== Championships by head coach ==
Head coach	School	Big Ten Championships
Bob Knight	Indiana	11
Ward Lambert	Purdue	11
Tom Izzo*	Michigan State	11
Walter Meanwell	Wisconsin	8
Fred Taylor	Ohio State	7
Gene Keady	Purdue	6
L. J. Cooke	Minnesota	5
Thad Matta	Ohio State	5
Harold Olsen	Ohio State	5
Matt Painter*	Purdue	5
Harry Combes	Illinois	4
Ralph Jones†	Purdue/Illinois	4
Branch McCracken	Indiana	4
Bo Ryan	Wisconsin	4
Everett Dean	Indiana	3
Bud Foster	Wisconsin	3
Jud Heathcote	Michigan State	3
E. J. Mather	Michigan	3
Douglas Mills	Illinois	3
Dave Strack	Michigan	3
Forddy Anderson	Michigan State	2
Emmett Angell	Wisconsin	2
Randy Ayers	Ohio State	2
Sam Barry	Iowa	2
John Beilein	Michigan	2
Tom Crean	Indiana	2
Bill Frieder	Michigan	2
Greg Gard*	Wisconsin	2
Arthur Lonborg	Northwestern	2
Bucky O'Connor	Iowa	2
Johnny Orr	Michigan	2
J. Craig Ruby	Illinois	2
Bill Self	Illinois	2
Bruce Weber	Illinois	2
John Benington	Michigan State	1
Ozzie Cowles	Michigan	1
Mike Davis	Indiana	1
Jim Dutcher	Minnesota	1
Tippy Dye	Ohio State	1
Pops Harrison	Iowa	1
Lou Henson	Illinois	1
Juwan Howard	Michigan	1
George King	Purdue	1
Lon Kruger	Illinois	1
Guy Lowman	Wisconsin	1
Dusty May*	Michigan	1
Dave McMillan	Minnesota	1
Bill Musselman	Minnesota	1
Lute Olsen	Iowa	1
Lee Rose	Purdue	1
Mark Turgeon	Maryland	1
Brad Underwood*	Illinois	1
George Veenker	Michigan	1
Lou Watson	Indiana	1

*Active Big Ten coach

†Ralph Jones won 2 championships each with Purdue and Illinois

== See also ==
- Big Ten men's basketball tournament
- Big Ten Conference women's basketball regular season champions
