= Ohio State University Armory and Gymnasium =

Former Ohio State University building

Coordinates: 40.0003°N 83.0094°W

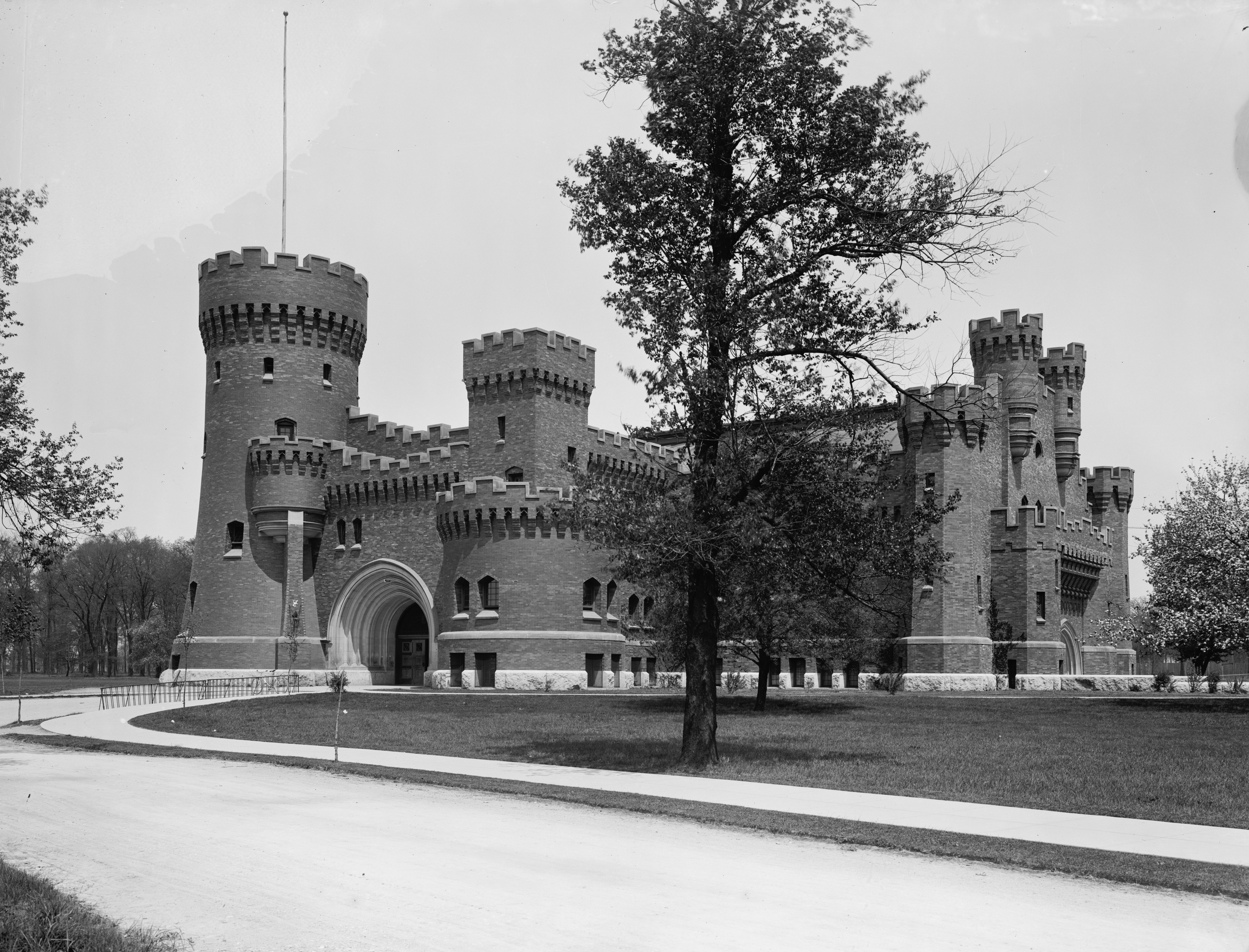
Building exterior

The Armory and Gymnasium was a campus building of the Ohio State University in Columbus, Ohio. The building was designed by prominent Ohio architects Yost & Packard and built in 1898. The multipurpose facility had a gymnasium, canvas running track, seats for 750, two swimming pools, and a cannon room. The building was home to Ohio State's men's basketball team. In 1918, the U.S. Army took over the building and used it for troop housing during World War I. The building stood through a fire in 1935. Another fire devastated the building in 1958, damaging it beyond repair. The building was demolished in 1959. The Wexner Center for the Arts opened on the site in 1989, with architecture inspired by the 1898 building.

== See also ==
- List of buildings at Ohio State University
