= Kenney Gym and Kenney Gym Annex =

Coordinates: 40°6′46.43″N 88°13′39.83″W

- Military Drill Hall and Men's Gymnasium
- U.S. National Register of Historic Places
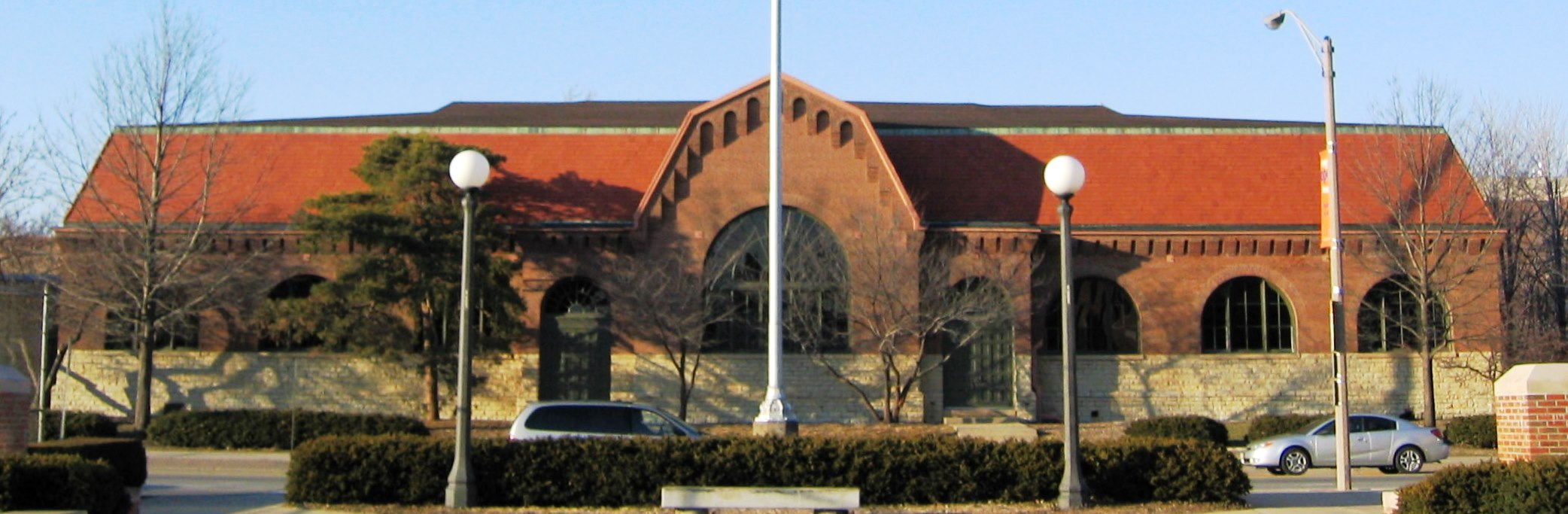
- Kenney Gym Annex (2006), built in 1890 as a drill hall
- Location: 1402-1406 W. Springfield Ave; Urbana, Illinois
- Built: Drill Hall (Annex): 1890; Gymnasium: 1902
- Architect: Drill Hall (Annex): Nathan Clifford Ricker; Gymnasium: Nelson Strong Spencer
- Architectural style: Gymnasium: Renaissance Revival
- MPS: University of Illinois Buildings by Nathan Clifford Ricker TR
- NRHP reference No.: 86003144
- Added to NRHP: November 19, 1986

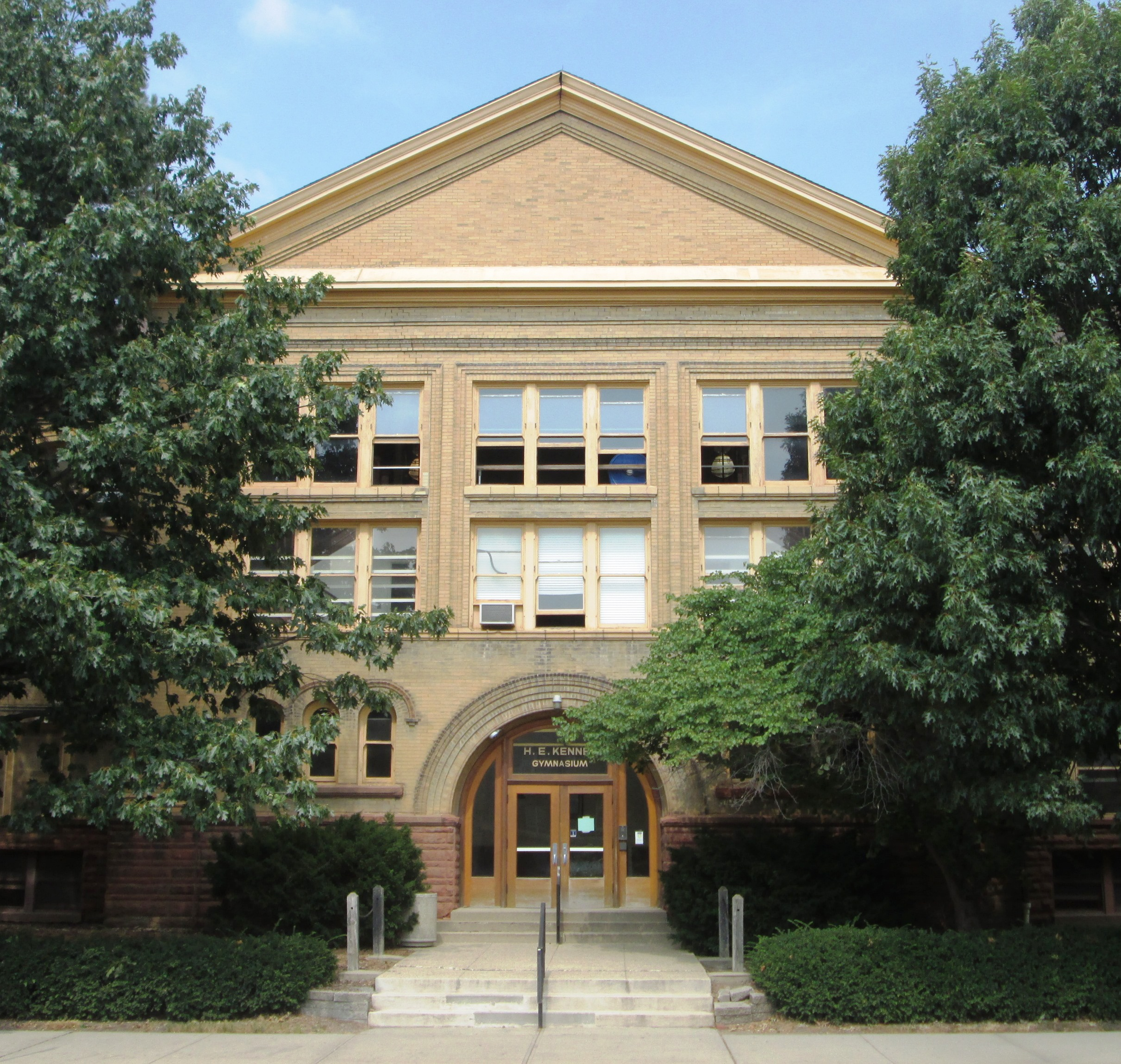
The Springfield Avenue entrance to the Kenney Gym (2013)

The Kenney Gym and the Kenney Gym Annex are two buildings located at 1402-06 Springfield Avenue in Urbana, Illinois, on the campus on the University of Illinois at Urbana-Champaign. Although the two buildings have been physically connected since 1914, they were built separately. They were jointly added to the National Register of Historic Places in 1986 under the name Military Drill Hall and Men's Gymnasium.

== History ==
The one-story building now known as the Kenney Gym Annex, the easternmost of the two structures, was built in 1889–90 as the Military Drill Hall and was designed by Nathan Clifford Ricker. The interior was converted for use as a gymnasium in 1914, at which time it became known as the Annex to the Men's Gym building next to it. The conversion preserved the building's large column-free open space, which had been a necessity for military drilling. An eastern addition was made to the building in 1918.

The Kenney Gym, the two-story building to the west, was built in 1902 and was designed by Nelson Strong Spencer in the Renaissance Revival style, strongly influenced by Ricker's design for the drill hall. It was originally called the Men's Gymnasium but was renamed the Men's Old Gym when Huff Hall opened in 1925. In 1974, it was named after Harold Eugene "Hek" Kenney, a former UIUC wrestler, coach, and administrator in the early 20th century.

Prior to the opening of Huff Hall in 1925, Kenney Gym housed the Illinois Fighting Illini men's basketball team. It was also home to the women's volleyball program from 1974 until 1989 and the men's wrestling team until those teams moved to Huff Hall.

From 1919 to 1925, Kenney Gym played host to the state finals of the Illinois High School Association boys' basketball tournament.

== Current use ==
Kenney Gym Annex is a 5,000-seat multi-purpose arena. Kenney Gym is the practice facility for the Fighting Illini men's and women's gymnastics teams.

The buildings are also used by University Laboratory High School in Urbana, located two blocks east of Kenney Gym on Springfield Avenue, as their gym for high school volleyball and basketball, along with their physical education program.
