= 1933–34 NCAA men's basketball season =

Men's collegiate basketball season

- Helms National Champions: Wyoming (retroactive selection in 1943)
- Player of the Year (Helms): Wesley Bennett, Westminster (Pa.) (retroactive selection in 1944)

The 1933–34 NCAA men's basketball season began in December 1933, progressed through the regular season and conference tournaments, and concluded in March 1934.

== Rule changes ==
- The "10-second" rule went into effect, requiring the team on offense to get the ball past the midcourt line within 10 seconds.
- A new substitution rule allowed each player to re-enter a game twice. Previously, each player could re-enter a game only once.
- The number of referees increased from one to two.

== Season headlines ==
- The Metropolitan New York Conference began play, with 10 original members.
- In February 1943, the Helms Athletic Foundation retroactively selected Wyoming as its national champion for the 1933–34 season.
- In 2009, the Premo-Porretta Power Poll retroactively selected Kentucky as its top-ranked team for the 1933–34 season.

== Conference membership changes ==
| School | Former conference | New conference |
|---|---|---|
| Brooklyn Bulldogs | Non-major basketball program | Metropolitan New York Conference |
| Bucknell Bison | Independent | Eastern Intercollegiate Conference |
| CCNY Beavers | Independent | Metropolitan New York Conference |
| Columbia Lions | See note | Metropolitan New York Conference |
| Fordham Rams | Independent | Metropolitan New York Conference |
| Harvard Crimson | Independent | Eastern Intercollegiate Basketball League |
| Long Island Blackbirds | Independent | Metropolitan New York Conference |
| Manhattan Jaspers | Independent | Metropolitan New York Conference |
| NYU Violets | Independent | Metropolitan New York Conference |
| Pratt Cannoneers | Non-major basketball program | Metropolitan New York Conference |
| St. Francis (NY) Terriers | Independent | Metropolitan New York Conference |
| St. John's Redmen | Independent | Metropolitan New York Conference |

NOTE: Columbia joined the Metropolitan New York Conference while remaining a member of the Eastern Intercollegiate Basketball League. It retained its membership in both until 1939.

== Regular season ==
=== Conferences ===
==== Conference winners and tournaments ====
| Conference | Regular season winner | Conference player of the year | Conference tournament | Tournament venue (City) | Tournament winner |
|---|---|---|---|---|---|
| Big Six Conference | Kansas | None selected | No Tournament | | |
| Big Ten Conference | Purdue | None selected | No Tournament | | |
| Border Conference | Texas Tech | None selected | No Tournament | | |
| Eastern Intercollegiate Basketball League | Penn | None selected | No Tournament | | |
| Eastern Intercollegiate Conference | Pittsburgh | None selected | No Tournament | | |
| Metropolitan New York Conference | NYU | None selected | No Tournament | | |
| Missouri Valley Conference | Butler | None selected | No Tournament | | |
| Pacific Coast Conference | Washington (North); USC (South) | | No Tournament; Washington defeated USC in best-of-three conference championship playoff series | | |
| Rocky Mountain Athletic Conference | Wyoming (Eastern); BYU (Western) | | No Tournament | | |
| Southeastern Conference | Alabama | None selected | 1934 SEC men's basketball tournament | Atlanta Athletic Club (Atlanta, Georgia) | Alabama |
| Southern Conference | South Carolina | None selected | 1934 Southern Conference men's basketball tournament | Thompson Gym (Raleigh, North Carolina) | Washington and Lee |
| Southwest Conference | TCU | None selected | No Tournament | | |

==== Conference standings ====
1933–34 Big Six Conference men's basketball standings
| | Conf. | | | | Overall |
| Team | W | | L | PCT | W | | L | PCT |
|---|---|---|---|---|---|---|---|---|
| Kansas | 9 | – | 1 | .900 | 16 | – | 1 | .941 |
| Missouri | 6 | – | 4 | .600 | 10 | – | 8 | .556 |
| Oklahoma | 6 | – | 4 | .600 | 10 | – | 8 | .556 |
| Nebraska | 5 | – | 5 | .500 | 7 | – | 11 | .389 |
| Iowa State | 2 | – | 8 | .200 | 6 | – | 11 | .353 |
| Kansas State | 2 | – | 8 | .200 | 3 | – | 15 | .167 |

1933–34 Big Ten Conference men's basketball standings
| | Conf. | | | | Overall |
| Team | W | | L | PCT | W | | L | PCT |
|---|---|---|---|---|---|---|---|---|
| Purdue | 10 | – | 2 | .833 | 17 | – | 3 | .850 |
| Wisconsin | 8 | – | 4 | .667 | 14 | – | 6 | .700 |
| Northwestern | 8 | – | 4 | .667 | 11 | – | 8 | .579 |
| Illinois | 7 | – | 5 | .583 | 13 | – | 6 | .684 |
| Iowa | 6 | – | 6 | .500 | 13 | – | 7 | .650 |
| Indiana | 6 | – | 6 | .500 | 13 | – | 7 | .650 |
| Minnesota | 5 | – | 7 | .417 | 9 | – | 11 | .450 |
| Ohio State | 4 | – | 8 | .333 | 8 | – | 12 | .400 |
| Michigan | 4 | – | 8 | .333 | 6 | – | 14 | .300 |
| Chicago | 2 | – | 10 | .167 | 5 | – | 15 | .250 |

1933–34 Border Conference men's basketball standings
| | Conf. | | | | Overall |
| Team | W | | L | PCT | W | | L | PCT |
|---|---|---|---|---|---|---|---|---|
| Texas Tech | 7 | – | 1 | .875 | 18 | – | 5 | .783 |
| Arizona | 9 | – | 3 | .750 | 18 | – | 9 | .667 |
| New Mexico | 6 | – | 4 | .600 | 16 | – | 4 | .800 |
| Arizona State Teachers | 8 | – | 10 | .444 | 9 | – | 11 | .450 |
| Arizona State Teachers–Flagstaff | 6 | – | 10 | .375 | 9 | – | 14 | .391 |
| New Mexico A&M | 2 | – | 6 | .250 | 10 | – | 9 | .526 |

1933–34 Eastern Intercollegiate Basketball League standings
| | Conf. | | | | Overall |
| Team | W | | L | PCT | W | | L | PCT |
|---|---|---|---|---|---|---|---|---|
| Penn | 10 | – | 2 | .833 | 16 | – | 3 | .842 |
| Cornell | 9 | – | 3 | .750 | 10 | – | 6 | .625 |
| Princeton | 7 | – | 5 | .583 | 13 | – | 8 | .619 |
| Yale | 7 | – | 5 | .583 | 14 | – | 9 | .609 |
| Dartmouth | 6 | – | 6 | .500 | 13 | – | 7 | .650 |
| Columbia | 3 | – | 9 | .250 | 5 | – | 14 | .263 |
| Harvard | 0 | – | 12 | .000 | 3 | – | 19 | .136 |

1933–34 Eastern Intercollegiate Conference men's basketball standings
| | Conf. | | | | Overall |
| Team | W | | L | PCT | W | | L | PCT |
|---|---|---|---|---|---|---|---|---|
| Pittsburgh | 8 | – | 0 | 1.000 | 18 | – | 4 | .818 |
| West Virginia | 7 | – | 3 | .700 | 14 | – | 5 | .737 |
| Georgetown | 5 | – | 5 | .500 | 12 | – | 11 | .522 |
| Temple | 5 | – | 5 | .500 | 9 | – | 12 | .429 |
| Carnegie Tech | 2 | – | 7 | .222 | 1 | – | 8 | .111 |
| Bucknell | 0 | – | 7 | .000 | 2 | – | 16 | .111 |

1933–34 Metropolitan New York Conference men's basketball standings
| | Conf. | | | | Overall |
| Team | W | | L | PCT | W | | L | PCT |
|---|---|---|---|---|---|---|---|---|
| NYU | 9 | – | 0 | 1.000 | 16 | – | 0 | 1.000 |
| LIU | 4 | – | 0 | 1.000 | 26 | – | 1 | .963 |
| CCNY | 4 | – | 1 | .800 | 14 | – | 1 | .933 |
| Manhattan | 4 | – | 4 | .500 | 8 | – | 10 | .444 |
| St. John's | 3 | – | 4 | .429 | 16 | – | 3 | .842 |
| St. Francis (NY) | 3 | – | 8 | .273 | 13 | – | 11 | .542 |
| Fordham | 1 | – | 4 | .200 | 11 | – | 5 | .688 |
| Brooklyn | 1 | – | 6 | .143 | 14 | – | 7 | .667 |
| Pratt Institute | | – | | – | 8 | – | 6 | .571 |

1933–34 Missouri Valley Conference men's basketball standings
| | Conf. | | | | Overall |
| Team | W | | L | PCT | W | | L | PCT |
|---|---|---|---|---|---|---|---|---|
| Butler | 9 | – | 1 | .900 | 14 | – | 7 | .667 |
| Creighton | 7 | – | 3 | .700 | 14 | – | 3 | .824 |
| Grinnell | 5 | – | 5 | .500 | 8 | – | 7 | .533 |
| Washington University | 4 | – | 6 | .400 | 7 | – | 11 | .389 |
| Drake | 4 | – | 6 | .400 | 6 | – | 12 | .333 |
| Oklahoma A&M | 1 | – | 9 | .100 | 4 | – | 14 | .222 |

1933–34 Pacific Coast Conference men's basketball standings
| | Conf. | | | | Overall |
| Team | W | | L | PCT | W | | L | PCT |
|---|---|---|---|---|---|---|---|---|
North
| Washington † | 14 | – | 2 | .875 | 20 | – | 5 | .800 |
| Oregon | 9 | – | 7 | .563 | 17 | – | 8 | .680 |
| Oregon State | 7 | – | 9 | .438 | 14 | – | 10 | .583 |
| Washington State | 6 | – | 10 | .375 | 14 | – | 11 | .560 |
| Idaho | 4 | – | 12 | .250 | 16 | – | 13 | .552 |
South
| USC | 9 | – | 3 | .750 | 16 | – | 8 | .667 |
| California | 8 | – | 4 | .667 | 19 | – | 7 | .731 |
| Stanford | 5 | – | 7 | .417 | 8 | – | 12 | .400 |
| UCLA | 2 | – | 10 | .167 | 10 | – | 13 | .435 |
† Conference playoff series winner

1933–34 Rocky Mountain Conference men's basketball standings
| | Conf. | | | | Overall |
| Team | W | | L | PCT | W | | L | PCT |
|---|---|---|---|---|---|---|---|---|
Eastern
| Wyoming | 14 | – | 0 | 1.000 | 26 | – | 4 | .867 |
| Colorado | 7 | – | 5 | .583 | 9 | – | 8 | .529 |
| Colorado College | 7 | – | 5 | .583 | 10 | – | 11 | .476 |
| Denver | 7 | – | 7 | .500 | 8 | – | 9 | .471 |
| Northern Colorado | 6 | – | 8 | .429 | 13 | – | 14 | .481 |
| Colorado Agricultural | 5 | – | 7 | .417 | 5 | – | 7 | .417 |
| Western State | 4 | – | 6 | .400 | 9 | – | 8 | .529 |
| Colorado Mines | 1 | – | 13 | .071 | 1 | – | 13 | .071 |
Western
| BYU | 9 | – | 3 | .750 | 18 | – | 12 | .600 |
| Utah State | 7 | – | 5 | .583 | 14 | – | 6 | .700 |
| Utah | 7 | – | 5 | .583 | 14 | – | 9 | .609 |
| Montana State | 1 | – | 11 | .083 | 5 | – | 22 | .185 |

1933–34 Southeastern Conference men's basketball standings
| | Conf. | | | | Overall |
| Team | W | | L | PCT | W | | L | PCT |
|---|---|---|---|---|---|---|---|---|
| Kentucky | 11 | – | 0 | 1.000 | 16 | – | 1 | .941 |
| Alabama † | 13 | – | 2 | .867 | 16 | – | 2 | .889 |
| LSU | 13 | – | 3 | .813 | 13 | – | 4 | .765 |
| Florida | 4 | – | 2 | .667 | 11 | – | 7 | .611 |
| Vanderbilt | 8 | – | 5 | .615 | 11 | – | 6 | .647 |
| Tulane | 8 | – | 10 | .444 | 10 | – | 10 | .500 |
| Georgia Tech | 5 | – | 8 | .385 | 6 | – | 12 | .333 |
| Tennessee | 3 | – | 5 | .375 | 10 | – | 7 | .588 |
| Mississippi State | 4 | – | 8 | .333 | 8 | – | 11 | .421 |
| Georgia | 3 | – | 6 | .333 | 10 | – | 9 | .526 |
| Ole Miss | 2 | – | 8 | .200 | 7 | – | 9 | .438 |
| Auburn | 2 | – | 9 | .182 | 2 | – | 11 | .154 |
| Sewanee | 0 | – | 10 | .000 | 0 | – | 13 | .000 |
† Regular-season championship and 1934 SEC Tournament winner

1933–34 Southern Conference men's basketball standings
| | Conf. | | | | Overall |
| Team | W | | L | PCT | W | | L | PCT |
|---|---|---|---|---|---|---|---|---|
| South Carolina | 6 | – | 0 | 1.000 | 18 | – | 1 | .947 |
| North Carolina | 12 | – | 2 | .857 | 18 | – | 4 | .818 |
| Maryland | 6 | – | 1 | .857 | 11 | – | 8 | .579 |
| Duke | 9 | – | 4 | .692 | 18 | – | 6 | .750 |
| North Carolina State | 6 | – | 5 | .545 | 11 | – | 6 | .647 |
| Washington and Lee † | 4 | – | 5 | .444 | 10 | – | 6 | .625 |
| VMI | 3 | – | 6 | .333 | 4 | – | 9 | .308 |
| Virginia | 1 | – | 9 | .100 | 7 | – | 11 | .389 |
| Virginia Tech | 1 | – | 10 | .091 | 1 | – | 15 | .063 |
| Clemson | 0 | – | 6 | .000 | 7 | – | 12 | .368 |
† Southern Conference Tournament winner

1933–34 Southwest Conference men's basketball standings
| | Conf. | | | | Overall |
| Team | W | | L | PCT | W | | L | PCT |
|---|---|---|---|---|---|---|---|---|
| TCU | 10 | – | 2 | .833 | 13 | – | 2 | .867 |
| Texas A&M | 7 | – | 5 | .583 | 14 | – | 6 | .700 |
| Arkansas | 6 | – | 6 | .500 | 16 | – | 8 | .667 |
| Texas | 6 | – | 6 | .500 | 14 | – | 8 | .636 |
| Rice | 6 | – | 6 | .500 | 6 | – | 6 | .500 |
| SMU | 5 | – | 7 | .417 | 6 | – | 9 | .400 |
| Baylor | 2 | – | 10 | .167 | 8 | – | 10 | .444 |

=== Major independents ===
A total of 63 college teams played as major independents. DePaul (17–0) was undefeated, and Western Kentucky State (28–8) finished with the most wins.

1933–34 NCAA men's basketball independents standings
| | Conf. | | | | Overall |
| Team | W | | L | PCT | W | | L | PCT |
|---|---|---|---|---|---|---|---|---|
| DePaul | | – | | – | 17 | – | 0 | 1.000 |
| Kansas State Teachers | | – | | – | 17 | – | 1 | .944 |
| Akron | | – | | – | 15 | – | 1 | .938 |
| Duquesne | | – | | – | 19 | – | 2 | .905 |
| Xavier | | – | | – | 9 | – | 1 | .900 |
| Syracuse | | – | | – | 15 | – | 2 | .882 |
| Navy | | – | | – | 11 | – | 2 | .846 |
| Notre Dame | | – | | – | 20 | – | 4 | .833 |
| Westminster (Pa.) | | – | | – | 24 | – | 5 | .828 |
| La Salle | | – | | – | 14 | – | 3 | .824 |
| Rhode Island State | | – | | – | 13 | – | 3 | .813 |
| Marquette | | – | | – | 15 | – | 4 | .789 |
| Western Kentucky State | | – | | – | 28 | – | 8 | .778 |
| Villanova | | – | | – | 9 | – | 3 | .750 |
| George Washington | | – | | – | 11 | – | 4 | .733 |
| Carleton | | – | | – | 12 | – | 5 | .706 |
| Michigan State Normal | | – | | – | 12 | – | 5 | .706 |
| Providence | | – | | – | 12 | – | 5 | .706 |
| Western State Teachers | | – | | – | 12 | – | 5 | .706 |
| Springfield (Mass.) | | – | | – | 11 | – | 5 | .688 |
| Colgate | | – | | – | 13 | – | 6 | .684 |
| Bowling Green State | | – | | – | 10 | – | 5 | .667 |
| Penn State | | – | | – | 8 | – | 4 | .667 |
| Richmond | | – | | – | 10 | – | 5 | .667 |
| Muhlenberg | | – | | – | 11 | – | 6 | .647 |
| Louisville | | – | | – | 16 | – | 9 | .640 |
| Cincinnati | | – | | – | 12 | – | 7 | .632 |
| Marshall | | – | | – | 13 | – | 8 | .619 |
| Montana | | – | | – | 16 | – | 10 | .615 |
| San Francisco | | – | | – | 8 | – | 5 | .615 |
| Rutgers | | – | | – | 9 | – | 6 | .600 |
| Dayton | | – | | – | 9 | – | 7 | .563 |
| Santa Clara | | – | | – | 9 | – | 7 | .563 |
| Saint Louis | | – | | – | 10 | – | 8 | .556 |
| Niagara | | – | | – | 11 | – | 9 | .550 |
| Canisius | | – | | – | 7 | – | 6 | .538 |
| Army | | – | | – | 8 | – | 7 | .533 |
| The Citadel | | – | | – | 8 | – | 7 | .533 |
| St. Bonaventure | | – | | – | 3 | – | 3 | .500 |
| Valparaiso | | – | | – | 9 | – | 9 | .500 |
| Indiana State | | – | | – | 8 | – | 9 | .471 |
| Detroit | | – | | – | 7 | – | 8 | .467 |
| Loyola (Ill.) | | – | | – | 7 | – | 8 | .467 |
| Washburn | | – | | – | 7 | – | 8 | .467 |
| Brown | | – | | – | 7 | – | 9 | .438 |
| Saint Mary's (Calif.) | | – | | – | 6 | – | 8 | .429 |
| Tulsa | | – | | – | 6 | – | 8 | .429 |
| Boston University | | – | | – | 5 | – | 7 | .417 |
| Toledo | | – | | – | 6 | – | 9 | .400 |
| Kent State | | – | | – | 5 | – | 9 | .357 |
| Lehigh | | – | | – | 5 | – | 9 | .357 |
| Wake Forest | | – | | – | 5 | – | 9 | .357 |
| St. Joseph's | | – | | – | 6 | – | 11 | .353 |
| Connecticut | | – | | – | 5 | – | 10 | .333 |
| Davidson | | – | | – | 6 | – | 13 | .316 |
| William & Mary | | – | | – | 4 | – | 9 | .308 |
| Furman | | – | | – | 5 | – | 12 | .294 |
| Miami (Ohio) | | – | | – | 4 | – | 11 | .267 |
| Ohio | | – | | – | 5 | – | 14 | .263 |
| Lafayette | | – | | – | 3 | – | 9 | .250 |
| Loyola (Md.) | | – | | – | 2 | – | 8 | .200 |
| Bradley | | – | | – | 3 | – | 14 | .176 |
| Texas State M&M | | – | | – | 3 | – | 16 | .158 |

== Awards ==
=== Consensus All-American team ===
Consensus Team
| Player | Class | Team |
|---|---|---|
| Norman Cottom | Junior | Purdue |
| Claire Cribbs | Junior | Pittsburgh |
| Moose Krause | Senior | Notre Dame |
| Hal Lee | Senior | Washington |
| Les Witte | Senior | Wyoming |

=== Major player of the year awards ===
- Helms Player of the Year: Wesley Bennett, Westminster (Pa.) (retroactive selection in 1944)

== Coaching changes ==
A number of teams changed coaches during the season and after it ended.

| Team | Former Coach | Interim Coach | New Coach | Reason |
|---|---|---|---|---|
| Colorado | Henry Iba | | Dutch Clark | Iba left to coach Oklahoma A&M. Clark continued playing for the Detroit Lions while coaching Colorado. |
| Colorado Agricultural | Joe Ryan | | Saaly Salwachter | |
| Fordham | Ed Kelleher | | Vincent Cavanaugh | |
| George Washington | Ted O'Leary | | Jim Pixlee & Logan Wilson | |
| Lehigh | Fay Bartlett | | Glenn Harmeson | |
| Loyola (Md.) | Tony Comerford | | William Liston | |
| Oklahoma A&M | Harold James | | Henry Iba | Iba also became baseball coach and will take over athletic director duties. |
| Princeton | Fritz Crisler | | John Jefferies | Crisler stayed to coach the football program. |
| Saint Mary's (Calif.) | Vince McNally | | Jim Underhill | |
| TCU | Francis Schmidt | | Dutch Meyer | Meyer also became head coach of the football program. |
| Texas | Ed Olle | | Marty Karow | |
| Texas Tech | Dell Morgan | | Virgil Ballard | |
| Toledo | David V. Connelly | | Harold Anderson | |
| VMI | W. C. Raftery | | Frank Summers | |
| Wisconsin | Walter Meanwell | | Harold E. Foster | |
