= 1934 NCAA Men's Basketball All-Americans =

- Awarded for: 1933–34 NCAA men's basketball season

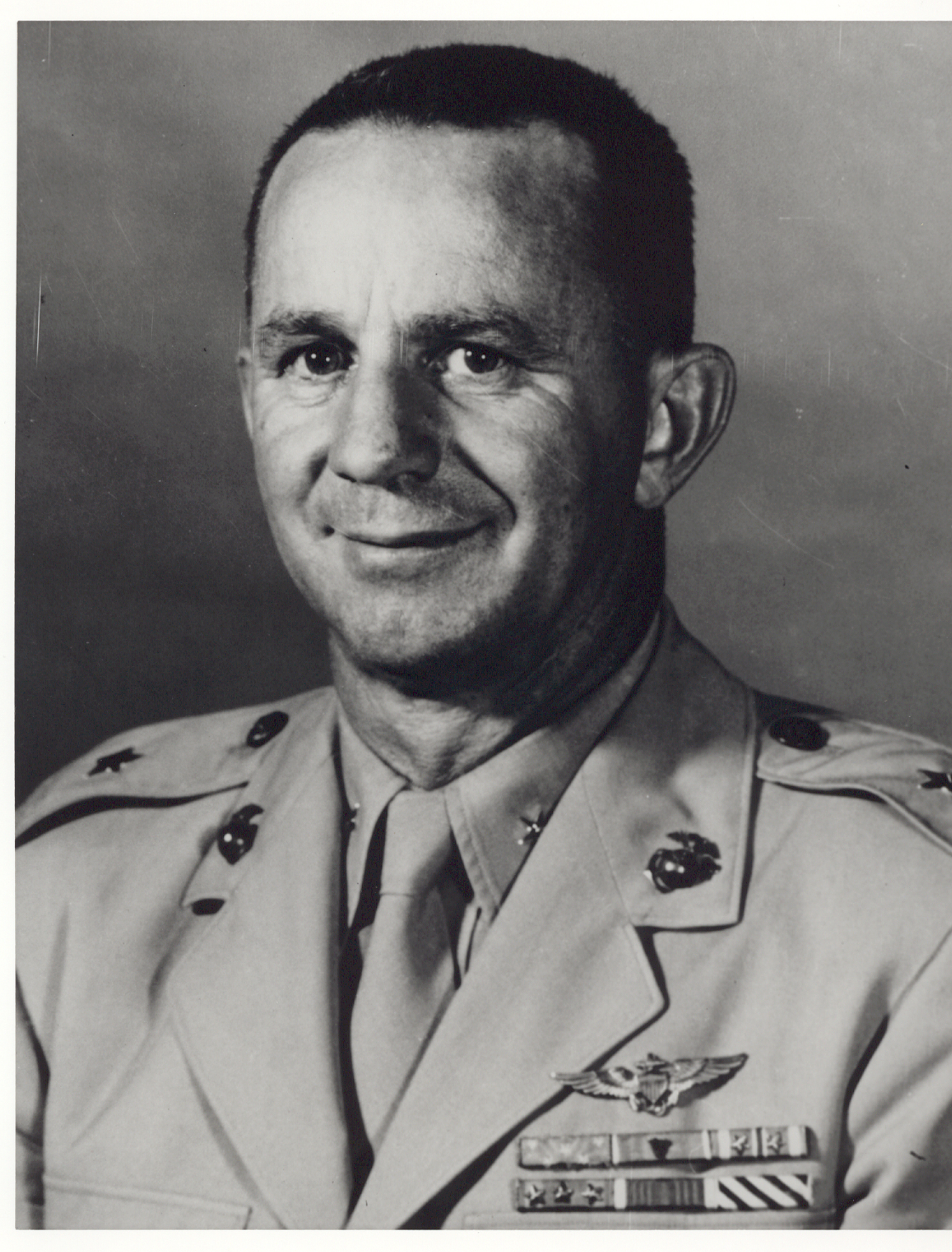
Robert Galer was a Helms Foundation All-America selection at Washington.

The consensus 1934 College Basketball All-American team, as determined by aggregating the results of three major All-American teams. To earn "consensus" status, a player must win honors from a majority of the following teams: the Helms Athletic Foundation, Converse and The Literary Digest.

== 1934 Consensus All-America team ==
Consensus Team
Player	Class	Team
Norman Cottom	Junior	Purdue
Claire Cribbs	Junior	Pittsburgh
Moose Krause	Senior	Notre Dame
Hal Lee	Senior	Washington
Les Witte	Senior	Wyoming

== Individual All-America teams ==
All-America Team
All-America Team	First team		Second team		Third team	
All-America Team	Player	School	Player	School	Player	School
Helms	Wesley Bennett	Westminster	No second or third teams			
Helms	Claire Cribbs	Pittsburgh	No second or third teams			
Helms	John DeMoisey	Kentucky	No second or third teams			
Helms	Harold Eifart	California	No second or third teams			
Helms	Robert Galer	Washington	No second or third teams			
Helms	Lee Guttero	Southern California	No second or third teams			
Helms	George Ireland	Notre Dame	No second or third teams			
Helms	Emmett Lowery	Purdue	No second or third teams			
Helms	Wallace Myers	Texas Christian	No second or third teams			
Helms	Les Witte	Wyoming	No second or third teams			
Converse	Claire Cribbs	Pittsburgh	Buzz Borries	Navy	Norman Cottom	Purdue
Converse	Moose Krause	Notre Dame	Moe Goldman	CCNY	William Davis	Kentucky
Converse	Ed Mullen	Marquette	Jack Gray	Texas	Lee Guttero	Southern California
Converse	Freddie Thompkins	South Carolina	Hal Lee	Washington	Gordon Norman	Minnesota
Converse	Les Witte	Wyoming	Ben Selzer	Iowa	Jim Thompson	Duke
Literary Digest	Hagan Anderson	NYU	Buzz Borries	Navy	Frank Baird	Butler
Literary Digest	Norman Cottom	Purdue	Moe Goldman	CCNY	Jack Gray	Texas
Literary Digest	Claire Cribbs	Pittsburgh	John McGuinnis	St. John's	Lee Guttero	Southern California
Literary Digest	Moose Krause	Notre Dame	Ben Selzer	Iowa	Egbert Miles	Yale
Literary Digest	Hal Lee	Washington	Jim Thompson	Duke	Ray Morstadt	Marquette

== See also ==
- 1933–34 NCAA men's basketball season
