= 1933–34 Georgia Bulldogs basketball team =

American college basketball season

1933–34 Georgia Bulldogs basketball
- Conference: Southeastern Conference
- Record: 10–9 (3–6 SEC)
- Head coach: Rex Enright (3rd season)
- Captain: Brown Wilder
- Home arena: Woodruff Hall

1933–34 Southeastern Conference men's basketball standings
	Conf.				Overall
Team	W		L	PCT	W		L	PCT
Kentucky	11	–	0	1.000	16	–	1	.941
Alabama †	13	–	2	.867	16	–	2	.889
LSU	13	–	3	.813	13	–	4	.765
Florida	4	–	2	.667	11	–	7	.611
Vanderbilt	8	–	5	.615	11	–	6	.647
Tulane	8	–	10	.444	10	–	10	.500
Georgia Tech	5	–	8	.385	6	–	12	.333
Tennessee	3	–	5	.375	10	–	7	.588
Mississippi State	4	–	8	.333	8	–	11	.421
Georgia	3	–	6	.333	10	–	9	.526
Ole Miss	2	–	8	.200	7	–	9	.438
Auburn	2	–	9	.182	2	–	11	.154
Sewanee	0	–	10	.000	0	–	13	.000
† Regular-season championship and 1934 SEC Tournament winner

The 1933–34 Georgia Bulldogs basketball team represented the University of Georgia as a member of the Southeastern Conference (SEC) during the 1933–34 NCAA men's basketball season. Led by third-year head coach Rex Enright, the Bulldogs compiled an overall record of 10–9 with a mark of 3–6 in conference play, placing tenth in the SEC. The team captain was Brown Wilder.

== Roster ==
1933–34 Georgia Bulldogs men's basketball team
Players
Coaches

Pos.	#	Name	Height	Weight	Year	Previous school	Hometown
		Frank Johnson	—	—
		Harrison Anderson	—	—
		Al Mazo	—	—
		Dan Bowden	—	—
		R.L. O'Kelley	—	—
		Brown Wilder	—	—
		Hal Gibson	—	—
		Flip Costa	—	—

Head coach

Rex Enright

Assistant coach(es)

Legend

- (C) Team captain
- (S) Suspended
- (I) Ineligible
- (W) Walk-on
- Injured
- Current redshirt

== Schedule ==
Date time, TV	Opponent	Result	Record	Site city, state
December 17, 1933	Atlanta YMCA	L 35-49	0–1	
December 23, 1933	Gulf Refining Co.	W 33-22	1–1	
1/5/1934	Chattanooga	W 23-15	2–1	
1/6/1934	Chattanooga	W 32-18	3–1	
1/10/1934	Florida	L 20-46	3–2	
1/11/1934	Florida	W 32-24	4–2	
January 13, 1934	Ga. Tech	L 25-33	4–3	
January 15, 1934	at Presbyterian	W 31-17	5–3	
January 20, 1934	Presbyterian	W 39-26	6–3	
January 27, 1934	at Ga. Tech	W 37-33	7–3	
2/2/1934	at Florida	L 35-37	7–4	
2/3/1934	at Florida	L 27-47	7–5	
2/6/1934	Clemson	W 29-23	8–5	
2/10/1934	at Auburn	L 21-30	8–6	
2/12/1934	at Alabama	L 17-51	8–7	
February 17, 1934	at Ga. Tech	W 28-27	9–7	
February 20, 1934	at Clemson	L 23-29	9–8	
February 23, 1934	Ga. Tech	W 33-19	10–8	
February 24, 1934	Vanderbilt	L 29-46	10–9	
*Non-conference game. (#) Tournament seedings in parentheses.
