= Elliott Loughlin =

United States Navy officer (1910–1989)

Charles Elliott Loughlin
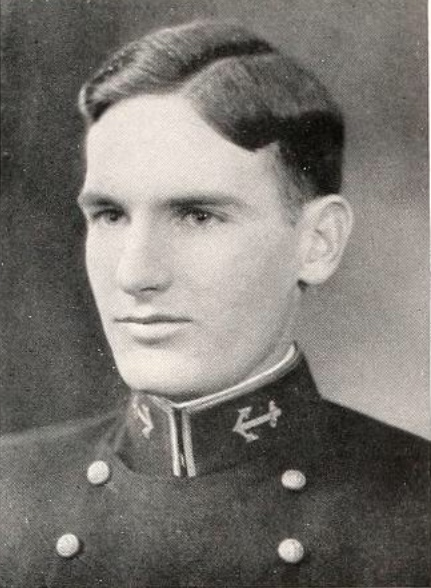
- Loughlin at the USNA in 1933
- Born: February 19, 1910; Wilmington, North Carolina, US
- Died: October 31, 1989 (aged 79)
- Burial place: United States Naval Academy Cemetery
- Military career
- Allegiance: United States of America
- Branch: United States Navy
- Service years: 1933–1968
- Rank: Rear Admiral
- Nickname: Elliott
- Commands: USS S-14 (SS-119); USS Queenfish (SS-393); USS Mississinewa (AO-144); USS Toledo (CA-133); Submarine Flotilla Six; Naval District Washington
- Conflicts: U.S. submarine campaign against the Japanese Empire
- Awards: Navy Cross (2) Legion of Merit (2) Silver Star Presidential Unit Citation

Charles Elliott Loughlin (February 19, 1910 – October 31, 1989) was an officer of the United States Navy, where he reached the rank of Rear Admiral. He is best known for his court-martial following the controversial sinking of the Japanese passenger/cargo ship Awa Maru sailing as a relief ship under Red Cross auspices. Archie Miyamoto described the sinking as one of the more controversial naval incidents of the Pacific War, particularly because Awa Maru had been granted safe passage for humanitarian relief under Red Cross auspices.. "Placing the Awa Maru Incident in the History of Maritime Disasters". He was the commanding officer of the USS Queenfish (SS-393) during four war patrols. Loughlin earned two Navy Crosses, two Legions of Merit and one Silver Star during his time in the United States Navy.

== Early life and career ==
While at the United States Naval Academy in Annapolis, Maryland, Loughlin played on the Midshipmen men's tennis and basketball teams and was named a consensus First Team All-American for basketball in 1932–33. Loughlin graduated from the Academy in 1933 and served in the battleship USS New Mexico (BB-40), part of the time as an assistant to Lieutenant Hyman G. Rickover. Following this, he went to submarine school and served in various submarines before taking command of the USS S-14 (SS-119) in the Panama area. Aboard S-14, Loughlin made four unremarkable Atlantic patrols.

== Command of USS Queenfish (SS–393) ==
=== First patrol ===
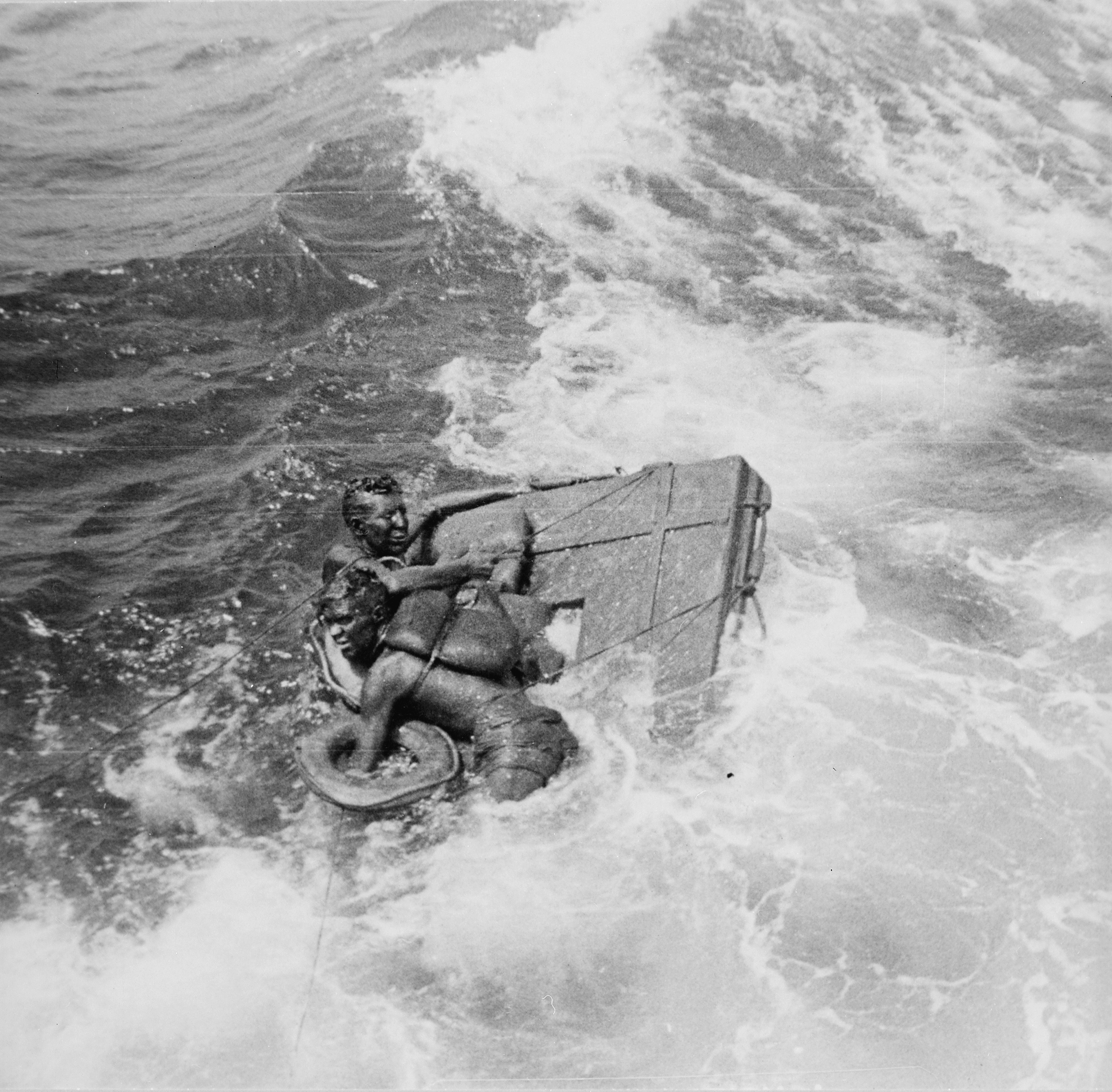
Queenfish rescuing British and Australian prisoners of war 18 September 1944

As member of a three-submarine wolfpack, Queenfish sank the 4,700-ton tanker Chiyoda Maru on 31 August 1944; and the 7,097-ton passenger-cargo ship Toyooka Maru and 3,054-ton transport Manshu Maru on 9 September 1944. On 18 September, Queenfish rescued 18 British and Australian prisoners of war adrift and afloat since their Japanese transport was sunk beneath them 12 September.

=== First Navy Cross ===
The President of the United States of America takes pleasure in presenting the Navy Cross to Commander Charles Elliott Loughlin (NSN: 0-72307/1100), United States Navy, for extraordinary heroism in the line of his profession as Commanding Officer of the U.S.S. QUEENFISH (SS-393), on the FIRST War Patrol of that submarine in enemy Japanese-controlled waters of the Luzon Strait, Philippine Islands, during the period 4 August 1944 to 3 October 1944. Pursuing highly aggressive and tenacious tactics despite strong air and surface opposition, Commander Loughlin penetrated enemy escort screens to launch damaging torpedo attacks against enemy Japanese shipping which resulted in the sinking of a 1,300-ton enemy destroyer, two large tankers, a large freighter and two large transports for a total of 48,000 tons. Participating in the rescue of eighteen British and Australian prisoners of war who were survivors of a Japanese ship which had been sunk, he provided care and treatment for the sick and wounded survivors and skillfully evaded severe countermeasures to bring his ship to port without serious damage. His skill, courage and devotion to duty were in keeping with the highest traditions of the United States Naval Service.

=== Second patrol ===
As the commander of a "wolfpack" of three submarines (Loughlin's Loopers I), on 8 November 1944, Loughlin sank 1,051-ton cargo ship Keijo Maru and the 1,948-ton cargo ship Hakko Maru. On 9 November, Queenfish sank the 2,131-ton ex-gunboat Chojusan Maru; on 15 November she sank the 9,186-ton aircraft ferry Akitsu Maru.

=== Second Navy Cross ===
The President of the United States of America takes pleasure in presenting a Gold Star in lieu of a Second Award of the Navy Cross to Commander Charles Elliott Loughlin (NSN: 0-72307/1100), United States Navy, for extraordinary heroism in the line of his profession as Commanding Officer of the U.S.S. QUEENFISH (SS-393), on the SECOND War Patrol of that submarine in enemy Japanese-controlled waters in the Pacific War Area, from 27 October to 2 December 1944. A skilled and aggressive leader, Commander Loughlin penetrated strong hostile escort screens to launch repeated attacks against hostile shipping and, by his courage and determination, succeeded in sinking a total of 35,300 tons and in damaging 10,000 tons. His superb ship-handling in evading severe Japanese countermeasures saved his ship from possible disaster and his devotion to duty throughout reflects the highest credit upon Commander Loughlin and the United States Naval Service.

Queenfish was awarded the Presidential Unit Citation for her first and second patrols.

=== Third patrol ===
Again the commander of a wolfpack of three submarines (Loughlin's Loopers II), Loughlin found great success as a wolfpack commander but comparatively little as a submarine commander. The wolfpack was given the mission of preventing reinforcement of the Philippines. Though personally receiving credit for just one-third of a sinking (shared with his packmates) Loughlin's Loopers II sank four ships and damaged three more.

=== Silver Star ===
The President of the United States of America takes pleasure in presenting the Silver Star to Commander Charles Elliott Loughlin (NSN: 0-72307/1100), United States Navy, for conspicuous gallantry and intrepidity in action as Commanding Officer of the U.S.S. QUEENFISH (SS-393), during the THIRD War Patrol of that submarine in enemy Japanese-controlled waters in the Formosa Straits and waters adjacent to the China Coast, from 29 December 1944 to 29 January 1945. Skillfully penetrating strong enemy escort screens to launch well-planned and smartly executed torpedo attacks, Commander Loughlin sank an enemy tanker of 10,000 tons and, in conjunction with other submarines of his group, sank a 300-ton enemy patrol craft by gunfire. As Group Commander, he contributed materially to the success of his command in sinking eight enemy ships totaling 60,000 tons and successfully evaded strong enemy anti-submarine measures. His skill, courage and devotion to duty were in keeping with the highest traditions of the United States Naval Service.

=== Fourth patrol ===
Now as the commander of a two-submarine wolfpack, Loughlin on 1 April 1945 sank the 11,600-ton passenger-cargo ship Awa Maru, marked and accepted as a protected hospital ship.

== Sinking of Awa Maru ==
On 28 March 1945 Vice Admiral Charles Lockwood messaged to all submarines

Let pass safely the Awa Maru carrying prisoner of war supplies. She will be passing through your areas between March 30 and April 4. She is lighted at night and plastered with white crosses.

Loughlin and Queenfish received this message, but its significance did not register because of the non-specificity of course, speed, and routing. Advised by another submarine of his wolfpack (USS Sea Fox (SS-402)) that targets were in the area, Loughlin thought he came upon a destroyer in a dense fog. Firing four torpedoes, Loughlin quickly sank the "destroyer" and recovered one survivor. Hours later the survivor revealed that Queenfish had sunk the Awa Maru. Loughlin immediately reported the sinking to Lockwood, and Lockwood in turn reported to Admirals Nimitz and King while ordering Queenfish and Sea Fox to search for more survivors. King's response was rapid:

Order Queenfish into port immediately...Detach Loughlin from his command and have him tried by a general court-martial.

While no more survivors were found, an estimated four thousand bales of raw rubber were seen. Four of these were recovered as Queenfish returned to Saipan.

== Court-martial ==
Lockwood's concerns were three:

1. that the incident would cause an international furor (similar to Lusitania), embarrassing to United States;
2. that the Japanese might "wreak barbarous reprisals" upon U.S. prisoners of war, especially submariners; and
3. that Loughlin, one of his best skippers, would be crucified.

Lockwood arranged the defense counsel, testified by deposition in Loughlin's defense, and accepted some blame via his lack of specificity on 28 March. The defense made two arguments. The first, that Awa Maru was not justified in safe passage, and though supported by the survivor and the recovered rubber, was found irrelevant. Loughlin did not know what Awa Maru carried, and at any rate, could not ignore the safe passage granted by higher authority. The second argument was lack of intent. Loughlin's tactics were those used against a small ship, not a large vessel. Via the discussion of tactical competence, Loughlin's entire war record was reviewed. Favorably impressing the court, Loughlin benefited further from refusing to pass the blame to others onboard Queenfish.

The court-martial dismissed the charges of "culpable inefficiency in the performance of duty and disobeying the lawful order of a superior." The court did find Loughlin guilty of negligence, and sentenced him to receive a Secretary of the Navy Letter of Admonition. Nimitz, believing the punishment lenient, gave the members of the court a Letter of Reprimand, a more serious penalty than they awarded Loughlin; and King said Loughlin could not have another command.

== Summary of World War II ==
It should be understood that all wartime awards for valor for submariners are based on the presumed damage made at the time of the attacks and not upon the post-war attribution. A review of Loughlin's several award citations highlight this difference.

Summary of CDR Charles E. Loughlin's USS S-14 (SS-119) and USS Queenfish (SS-393) War Patrols
	Departing from	Date	Days	Wartime Credit Ships/Tonnage	JANAC Credit Ships/Tonnage	Patrol Area
S-14-1	Atlantic	1942	32	zero / zero	0 / 0	Atlantic
S-14-2	Atlantic	1942	10	zero / zero	0 / 0	Atlantic
S-14-3	Atlantic	1942	17	zero / zero	0 / 0	Atlantic
S-14-4	Atlantic	1942	24	zero / zero	0 / 0	Atlantic
Queenfish-1	Pearl Harbor, TH	August 1944	59	6 / 48,800	3 / 14,851	Luzon Strait
Queenfish-2	Pearl Harbor, TH	October 1944	35	4 / 38,500	4 / 14,316	East China Sea
Queenfish-3	Pearl Harbor, TH	December 1944	32	1 / 10,100	1/3 / 951	Empire; Shared with Barb and Picuda
Queenfish-4	Pearl Harbor, TH	February 1945	46	1 / 12,000	1 / 11,600	Formosa Strait

CDR Loughlin's Ranking Compared with Other Top Skippers
Ranking	Number of Patrols	Ships/Tons Credited	Ships/Tons JANAC
35	8	12 / 109,400	8 1/3 / 41,718

== Post-war career ==
Following court-martial, Loughlin joined Lockwood's staff. He later served as the Naval Academy's athletic director and is credited with the rebirth of the football, cross country and wrestling programs at the school through his fundraising efforts. Loughlin continued his career by serving on various staffs, was executive officer of the submarine tender USS Orion (AS-18), commanded a submarine division and a submarine squadron. He became commanding officer of the oiler USS Mississinewa (AO-144) and the cruiser USS Toledo (CA-133). He was plans officer on SACLant staff, and Commander Submarine Flotilla Six during the buildup of the Polaris force, for which he was awarded his first Legion of Merit.

=== First Legion of Merit ===
The President of the United States of America takes pleasure in presenting the Legion of Merit to Rear Admiral Charles Elliott Loughlin (NSN: 0-72307/1100), United States Navy, for exceptionally meritorious conduct in the performance of outstanding services to the Government of the United States as Commander Submarine Flotilla SIX from 24 August 1964 to 24 September 1966. As an extremely competent and resourceful leader, Rear Admiral Loughlin exercised military and operational command over a major portion of the Submarine Force, U.S. Atlantic Fleet during a period of unprecedented growth. In particular, he supervised the post construction and post overhaul pre-deployment training, Demonstration and Shakedown Operations (DASO) and tactical load out periods for the Fleet Ballistic Missile Submarines in an exemplary manner. By virtue of dynamic leadership and outstanding professional knowledge, he ensured the successful operation of two SSBN replenishment sites and the effective functioning of off crew support operations at Charleston, South Carolina. Rear Admiral Loughlin further has proven to be a most articulate and impressive spokesman for the Navy. In carrying out all of the foregoing duties, as well as the additional NATO duty of Commander Submarine Force, Eastern Atlantic Area (Designate), Rear Admiral Loughlin has demonstrated the finest degree of judgment and an inspiring devotion to duty which has been fully in keeping with the highest traditions of the United States Naval Service.

As Commandant of the Washington Naval District, Loughlin closed his career with his second Legion of Merit.

=== Second Legion of Merit ===
The President of the United States of America takes pleasure in presenting a Gold Star in lieu of a Second Award of the Legion of Merit to Rear Admiral Charles Elliott Loughlin (NSN: 0-72307/1100), United States Navy, for exceptionally meritorious conduct in the performance of outstanding services to the Government of the United States from October 1966 to June 1968 as Commandant, Naval District, Washington, D.C. Exercising outstanding leadership, tact, and judgment, Rear Admiral Loughlin successfully directed and supervised the efforts of the large, diversified complex of naval activities that comprise his command, all of which are dedicated to the mission of Fleet support. Under his command, military-civilian relationships have been enhanced, leading to an increased awareness of the important role played by the Navy in the community. Rear Admiral Loughlin maintained close contact with civilian leaders in his area of coordination with a resultant increase in integrated off-base housing for military personnel. Further, he coordinated the Navy Youth Opportunity Program and Civil Disturbance Plan for his area of command. He established policies which encourage, and has personally fostered, the closest cooperation among the Navy and the other services as well as with civilian groups. By his outstanding leadership, foresight, and keen intellect, Rear Admiral Loughlin has significantly enhanced the material effectiveness of his complex command, and has upheld the highest traditions of the United States Naval Service.
