= 1933 NCAA Men's Basketball All-Americans =

- Awarded for: 1932–33 NCAA men's basketball season

The consensus 1933 College Basketball All-American team, as determined by aggregating the results of three major All-American teams. To earn "consensus" status, a player must win honors from a majority of the following teams: the Helms Athletic Foundation, Converse and College Humor Magazine.

== 1933 Consensus All-America team ==
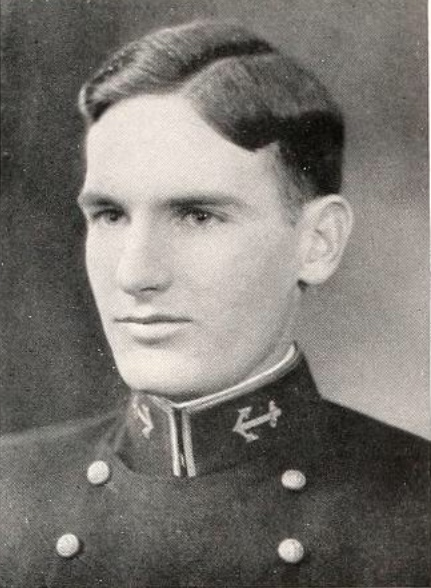
Navy’s Elliott Loughlin.

Consensus Team
Player	Class	Team
Moose Krause	Junior	Notre Dame
Elliott Loughlin	Senior	Navy
Jerry Nemer	Senior	Southern California
Joe Reiff	Senior	Northwestern
Forest Sale	Senior	Kentucky
Don Smith	Senior	Pittsburgh

== Individual All-America teams ==
All-America Team
All-America Team	First team		Second team		Third team	
All-America Team	Player	School	Player	School	Player	School
Helms	Frank Baird	Butler	No second or third teams			
Helms	Ken Fairman	Princeton	No second or third teams			
Helms	Ellis Johnson	Kentucky	No second or third teams			
Helms	Ed Lewis	Oregon State	No second or third teams			
Helms	Elliott Loughlin	Navy	No second or third teams			
Helms	Jerry Nemer	Southern California	No second or third teams			
Helms	Joe Reiff	Northwestern	No second or third teams			
Helms	Forest Sale	Kentucky	No second or third teams			
Helms	Don Smith	Pittsburgh	No second or third teams			
Helms	Les Witte	Wyoming	No second or third teams			
College Humor	Skinny Johnson	Kansas	Alan Brachen	Providence	Richard Arney	Carleton
College Humor	Elliott Loughlin	Navy	Conrad Collin	Creighton	Ken Fairman	Princeton
College Humor	Joe Reiff	Northwestern	Moose Krause	Notre Dame	James Fergus	Carnegie Mellon
College Humor	Forest Sale	Kentucky	Nathan Lazar	St. John's	Steve Hokuf	Nebraska
College Humor	Don Smith	Pittsburgh	Jerry Nemer	Southern California	Freddie Thompkins	South Carolina
Converse	Eddie Finnigan	Case Western Reserve	No second or third teams			
Converse	Moose Krause	Notre Dame	No second or third teams			
Converse	Elliott Loughlin	Navy	No second or third teams			
Converse	Forest Sale	Kentucky	No second or third teams			
Converse	Don Smith	Pittsburgh	No second or third teams			

== See also ==
- 1932–33 NCAA men's basketball season
