= Lincoln High School (Lincoln, Nebraska) =

Public high school in Lincoln, Nebraska

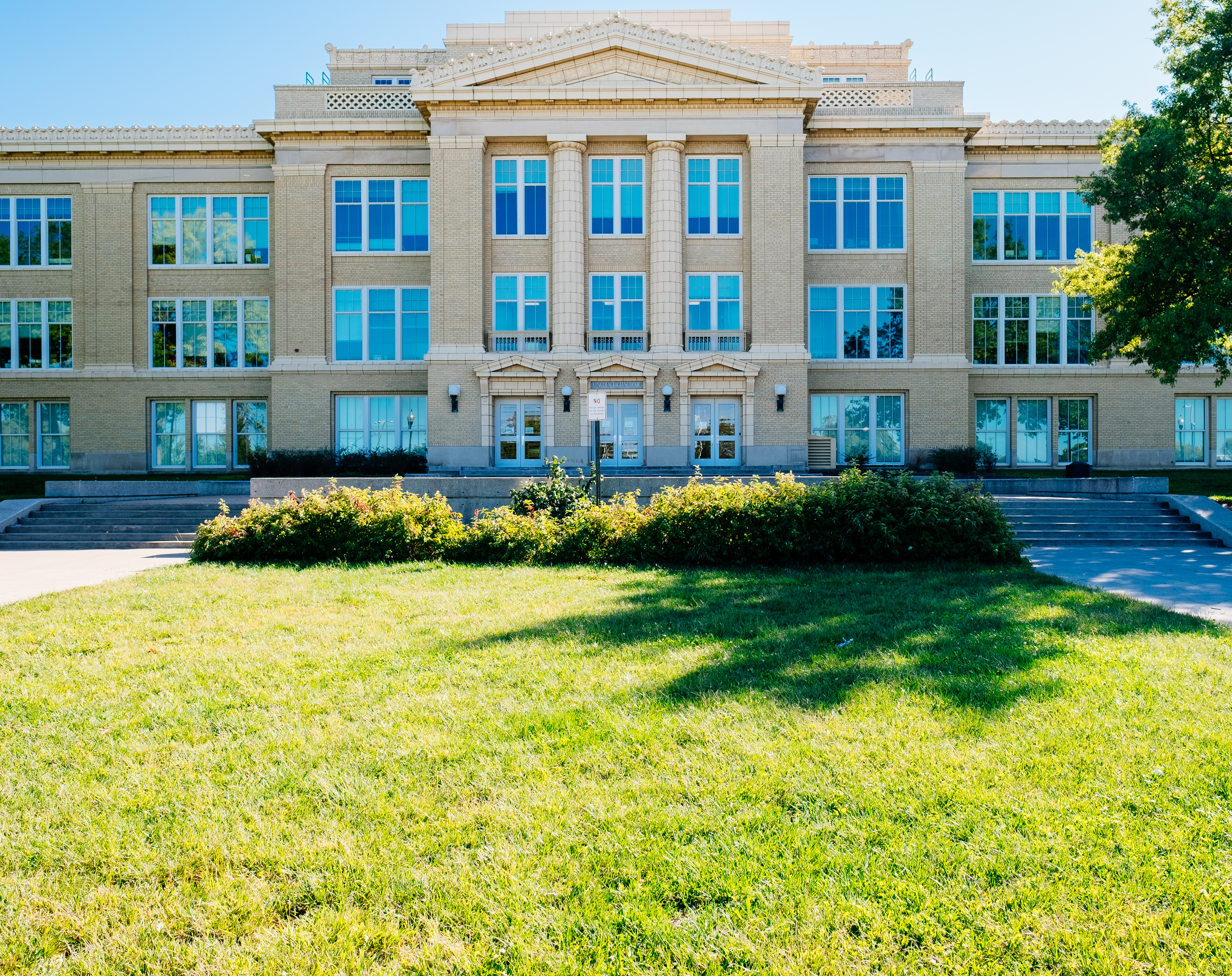
- Lincoln High School in 2017

Location
- 2229 J Street; Lincoln, Nebraska 68510; United States; 40°48′24″N 96°41′19″W

Information
- School type: High school
- Established: 1871
- Principal: Mark Larson
- Faculty: 280
- Enrollment: 1,932 (2025-2026)
- Color
- Mascot: Black/Red Links
- Nobel laureates: Robert B. Wilson
- Website: lhs.lps.org

Lincoln High School is a public secondary school located in Lincoln, Nebraska, United States. A part of the Lincoln Public Schools school district, it is the largest high school in the city. More than 60,000 students have graduated from Lincoln High in its 155-year history. The school colors are red and black, and the mascot is the Links. Its mascot is memorialized in a statue on the school's front lawn, gifted by the class of 1970, with four individual links chained together. These represent the hopeful characteristics of Lincoln High School: tradition, diversity, excellence, and unity.

== History ==
Lincoln High School was founded in 1871 and is the oldest of eight public high schools in the city of Lincoln. The present building was opened in 1915, with significant additions completed in 1927, 1957, 1985, and 1996. It is accredited by the North Central Association of Colleges and Secondary Schools and has the AA accreditation rating of the Nebraska State Board of Education. In 1984 it was named a Recognized School of Excellence by the U.S. Department of Education. Lincoln High School began its formal participation in the International Baccalaureate Program in 2008 after a formal application process. It is one of only three high schools in Nebraska involved in the program. The others are Millard North High School and Omaha Central High School, both located in Omaha.

In 2018, Lincoln High School was honored as a "School of Opportunity" by the National Education Policy Center, at the University of Colorado Boulder, for its commitment to multicultural educational support and academic rigor. It was one of only eight public schools awarded this honor with the "Gold" designation, the highest designation for this honor. Principal Mark Larson states, "This recognition also speaks to the unique culture that has been in place at Lincoln High for many years and hopefully will continue for years to come."

While teaching at Lincoln High School, four Lincoln High faculty have been honored as Nebraska Teacher of the Year, including John Heineman (2000), Patsy Koch Johns (2006), Amber Vlasnik (2017), and Sydney Jensen (2019).

After the Lincoln Public Schools administration building burned in 2011, the Lincoln High Library Media Center staff realized the importance of digitizing the archives of Lincoln High School. The school newspaper, The Advocate, is available digitally.

== Student body and academic programs ==
Lincoln High's total enrollment is 1,932, consisting of 46% White students, 11% African-American, 10% Asian-American, 21% Hispanic/Latino, and 2% Native American, Native Hawaiian, or Alaska Native. 9% of students are of two or more races. LHS has approximately 330 students in ELL (English Language Learner) classes. Over 60% of its student body is in the Free or Reduced Price Lunch Program, and 17% are identified as either gifted or highly gifted. Over 30 different languages are spoken as first languages to students. The largest group speak Spanish (56), and the next four largest groups speak Arabic, Kurdish, Vietnamese, and Karen. Other languages spoken are Russian, Ukrainian, Nuer (Sudan), Bosnian, Pashto, Dinka, Cambodian, Filipino, Chinese, and Burmese.

Lincoln High School offers hundreds of courses in twelve different departments to its over 2,000 students, operating on a seven-period day schedule. It has 150 certified staff members and 90 support staff members. It is also the only high school in Lincoln to offer the International Baccalaureate program to gifted or highly gifted students.

== Athletics ==
Lincoln High School competes as a NSAA District 1 school in the Heartland Athletic Conference.

=== Baseball ===
Lincoln High School's baseball program is headed by Coach Chaz Dunn and Assistant Coach Max Roberts, JV Dan Monroe, Reserve Thomas Riley, and Freshman Nick Stephan. The baseball program won state championships in 1951, 1952, 1954, 1955, 1956 and 1963, and last had measurable success under coach Sam Sharpe from 1991-1992.

=== Wrestling ===
Lincoln High School's wrestling program is headed by Coach Andy Genrich. Lincoln High last won a state championship in 1992 and has had 29 individual state champions. In 2009, the program had success in qualifying three wrestlers for state, all by winning first place at the district meet.

=== Football ===
Lincoln High School's football program competes in the NSAA's Class A Division. The team is headed by Head Coach Mark Macke. Coach Macke has compiled a record of 40-60 since taking over the program in 2013. Lincoln High School's varsity football team has earned a berth into the Class A Playoffs nine times in school history, with the most recent occurring in 2020. Their most successful season ended in a State Championship Game loss to Lincoln Southeast High School in 1992, with a final score of 17-0.

=== State championships ===
State championships
Season	Sport/activity	Number of championships	Year
Fall	Tennis, boys'	5	1954, 1955, 1957, 1958, 1974
Fall	Cross country, boys'	3	1987, 1989, 1990
Fall	Cross country, girls'	3	1985, 1986, 1987
Fall	Volleyball	1	1975
Winter	Wrestling	2	1969, 1992
Winter	Basketball, boys'	15	1914, 1915, 1917, 1918, 1920, 1927, 1930, 1934, 1938, 1942, 1943, 1946, 1958, 1959, 2003
Winter	Basketball, girls'	1	1980
Winter	Swimming and diving, boys'	11	1933, 1934, 1940, 1941, 1942, 1947, 1948, 1950, 1955, 1956, 1957
Spring	Golf, boys'	18	1931, 1933, 1934, 1935, 1937, 1940, 1943, 1944, 1945, 1946, 1947, 1948, 1949, 1953, 1955, 1957, 1964, 1967
Spring	Track and field, boys'	16	1900, 1901, 1902, 1918, 1919, 1923, 1927, 1929, 1935, 1939, 1940, 1942, 1944, 1951, 1960, 2018
Spring	Track and field, girls'	1	1982
Spring	Baseball	6	1951, 1952, 1954, 1955, 1956, 1963
Total		82	

== Notable alumni ==
- Francis Allen, USA Gymnastics Hall of Fame coach
- John Moore Allison, diplomat
- Dick Cavett, entertainer and author
- Sandy Dennis, Academy Award-winning actress
- Mike Fultz, drafted 32nd overall in 1977 NFL draft by New Orleans Saints
- Dixie Kiefer, U.S. Navy commodore, served in both world wars
- Bill Kinnamon, Major League Baseball umpire
- Herman F. Kramer, U.S. Army major general
- Les Mann, MLB player for Boston Braves, Chicago Cubs, St. Louis Cardinals, Cincinnati Reds, and New York Giants
- Shirley Marsh, Nebraska state senator
- Bernie Masterson, NFL player and winner of 1940 NFL Championship game with the Chicago Bears
- Gil Savery, journalist
- Ted Sorensen, special counsel to President John F. Kennedy
- Charles Starkweather, spree killer, responsible for murders of 11 people in the 1950s
- Robert B. Wilson, winner of the 2020 Nobel Memorial Prize in Economic Sciences along with Paul Milgrom
- Les Witte, two-time consensus All-American basketball player at Wyoming
- Willard Witte, men's basketball head coach of 1933–34 Wyoming national championship team

== Proficiency Scores ==
At Lincoln High School, student proficiency rates on state-required assessments are as follows:

• Math Proficiency: 40% of students score at or above proficiency levels

• Reading / ELA Proficiency: 40% of students achieve proficiency

• Science Proficiency: 40% of students reach proficiency on state science assessments.
