= 1933–34 Wyoming Cowboys basketball team =

American college basketball season

1933–34 Wyoming Cowboys basketball

RMAC Champions Helms Foundation National Champions
- Conference: Rocky Mountain Athletic Conference
- Record: 26–4 (14–0 RMAC)
- Head coach: Willard Witte (4th season)
- MVP: Les Witte
- Captain: Les Witte
- Home arena: Half Acre Gym

1933–34 Rocky Mountain Conference men's basketball standings
	Conf.				Overall
Team	W		L	PCT	W		L	PCT
Eastern
Wyoming	14	–	0	1.000	26	–	4	.867
Colorado	7	–	5	.583	9	–	8	.529
Colorado College	7	–	5	.583	10	–	11	.476
Denver	7	–	7	.500	8	–	9	.471
Northern Colorado	6	–	8	.429	13	–	14	.481
Colorado Agricultural	5	–	7	.417	5	–	7	.417
Western State	4	–	6	.400	9	–	8	.529
Colorado Mines	1	–	13	.071	1	–	13	.071
Western
BYU	9	–	3	.750	18	–	12	.600
Utah State	7	–	5	.583	14	–	6	.700
Utah	7	–	5	.583	14	–	9	.609
Montana State	1	–	11	.083	5	–	22	.185

The 1933–34 Wyoming Cowboys basketball team represented the University of Wyoming during the 1933–34 NCAA men's basketball season in the United States. The head coach was Willard Witte, coaching in his fourth season with the Cowboys. The team finished the season with a 26–4 record and were named national champions by the Helms Athletic Foundation.

== Schedule and results ==
Date time, TV	Rank^{#}	Opponent^{#}	Result	Record	Site city, state
Regular season
12/16/1933*		Fort Collins VFW	W 43–26	1–0	Half Acre Gym; Laramie, WY
12/19/1933*		Denver Athletic Club	W 39–33	2–0	Half Acre Gym; Laramie, WY
12/21/1933*		at Piggly Wiggly	L 19–24	2–1	
1/2/1934*		Fort Warren	W 61–18	3–1	Half Acre Gym; Laramie, WY
1/5/1934		Western State	W 36–20	4–1 (1–0)	Half Acre Gym; Laramie, WY
1/6/1934		Western State	W 37–22	5–1 (2–0)	Half Acre Gym; Laramie, WY
1/12/1934		at Northern Colorado	W 38–17	6–1 (3–0)	Greeley, CO
1/20/1934*		at Nebraska	W 33–24	7–1	Nebraska Coliseum; Lincoln, NE
1/24/1934		Denver	W 42–31	8–1 (4–0)	Half Acre Gym; Laramie, WY
1/27/1934		at Colorado	W 18–13	9–1 (5–0)	Boulder, CO
1/31/1934		Colorado	W 35–17	10–1 (6–0)	Half Acre Gym; Laramie, WY
2/3/1934		at Denver	W 41–33	11–1 (7–0)	Denver, CO
2/10/1934		Colorado College	W 37–32	12–1 (8–0)	Half Acre Gym; Laramie, WY
2/11/1934		Colorado College	W 28–18	13–1 (9–0)	Half Acre Gym; Laramie, WY
2/17/1934		Northern Colorado	W 42–27	14–1 (10–0)	Half Acre Gym; Laramie, WY
2/25/1934		at Colorado State	W 41–15	15–1 (11–0)	South College Gymnasium; Fort Collins, CO
3/1/1934		at Colorado State	W 39–21	16–1 (12–0)	South College Gymnasium; Fort Collins, CO
3/3/1934		Colorado School of Mines	W 49–25	17–1 (13–0)	Half Acre Gym; Laramie, WY
3/4/1934		Colorado Mines	W 41–16	18–1 (14–0)	Half Acre Gym; Laramie, WY
3/8/1934*		BYU	W 43–38	19–1	Half Acre Gym; Laramie, WY
3/9/1934*		BYU	W 47–44 ^{OT}	20–1	Half Acre Gym; Laramie, WY
3/10/1934*		BYU	W 43–34	21–1	Half Acre Gym; Laramie, WY
3/12/1934*		Belen, New Mexico	W 58–11	22–1	Half Acre Gym; Laramie, WY
3/13/1934*		Wilcox Oilers	W 43–20	23–1	Half Acre Gym; Laramie, WY
3/14/1934*		Ogden Boosters	W 39–35	24–1	Half Acre Gym; Laramie, WY
3/15/1934*		Gridley Pontiac Chieftains	W 28–25	25–1	Half Acre Gym; Laramie, WY
3/16/1934*		Reno Creamery	W 30–27	26–1	Half Acre Gym; Laramie, WY
3/17/1934*		Tulsa	L 19–29	26–2	Half Acre Gym; Laramie, WY
3/23/1934*		vs. Piggly Wiggly	L 29–35	26–3	Casper, WY
3/24/1934*		vs. Piggly Wiggly	L 29–31	26–4	Casper, WY
*Non-conference game. ^{#}Rankings from AP Poll. (#) Tournament seedings in parentheses.
