= 1933–34 UCLA Bruins men's basketball team =

American college basketball season

1933–34 UCLA Bruins men's basketball
- Conference: Pacific Coast Conference
- South
- Record: 10–13 (2–10 PCC)
- Head coach: Caddy Works (13th season)
- Assistant coaches: Wilbur Johns; Silas Gibbs; Dick Linthicum

1933–34 Pacific Coast Conference men's basketball standings
	Conf.				Overall
Team	W		L	PCT	W		L	PCT
North
Washington †	14	–	2	.875	20	–	5	.800
Oregon	9	–	7	.563	17	–	8	.680
Oregon State	7	–	9	.438	14	–	10	.583
Washington State	6	–	10	.375	14	–	11	.560
Idaho	4	–	12	.250	16	–	13	.552
South
USC	9	–	3	.750	16	–	8	.667
California	8	–	4	.667	19	–	7	.731
Stanford	5	–	7	.417	8	–	12	.400
UCLA	2	–	10	.167	10	–	13	.435
† Conference playoff series winner

The 1933–34 UCLA Bruins men's basketball team represented the University of California, Los Angeles during the 1933–34 NCAA men's basketball season and were members of the Pacific Coast Conference. The Bruins were led by 13th year head coach Caddy Works. They finished the regular season with a record of 10–13 and were fourth in the southern division with a record of 2–10.

== Previous season ==
The Bruins finished the regular season with a record of 10–11 and were fourth in the southern division with a record of 1–10.

== Roster ==
1933–34 UCLA Bruins men's basketball team
Players
Coaches

Pos.	#	Name	Height	Weight	Year	Hometown
G	18	Don Ashen	—	—	So
G	25	William Athey	—	—
F		Lloyd Bridges	—	—
F	28	Charles Church	—	—
G		Cordner Gibson	—	—
G	23	Horace Haight	—	—
F		Shelby Johns	—	—
F		Ralph McFadden	—	—
F		Ernest McRitchie	—	—
F		Clem Melancon	—	—
F	29	Donald Piper (C)	—	—	Sr
C		Bill Reitz	—	—
G		Duke Trotter	—	—
G		John Wells	—	—
G		George Westphal	—	—
F		Alex Wildlicska	—	—

Head coach

Caddy Works

Assistant coach(es)

- Wilbur Johns (UCLA)
- Silas Gibbs (UCLA)
- Dick Linthicum (UCLA)

Legend

- (C) Team captain
- (S) Suspended
- (I) Ineligible
- (W) Walk-on
- Injured
- Current redshirt

Roster
Last update: 30 January 2018

== Schedule ==
Date time, TV	Rank^{#}	Opponent^{#}	Result	Record	Site city, state
Regular Season
*		Long Beach Junior College	W 52–29	1–0	Men's Gym; Los Angeles, CA
*		Whittier	W 37–27	2–0	Men's Gym; Los Angeles, CA
*		La Verne	W 48–24	3–0	Men's Gym; Los Angeles, CA
*		at Chico State	W 31–28	4–0	Chico, CA
*		at Chico State	W 41–23	5–0	Chico, CA
*		at St. Mary's	W 55–45	6–0	Moraga, CA
*		at San Francisco Olympic Club	L 30–35	6–1	San Francisco, CA
*		at San Francisco Athens Athletic Club	W 33–27	7–1	San Francisco, CA
*		at Santa Clara	L 24–47	7–2	Santa Clara, CA
*		at Santa Clara	L 24–40	7–3	Santa Clara, CA
*		Los Angeles Junior College	W 35–15	8–3	Men's Gym; Los Angeles, CA
		Stanford	L 26–45	8–4 (0–1)	Men's Gym; Los Angeles, CA
		Stanford	W 32–31	9–4 (1–1)	Men's Gym; Los Angeles, CA
		USC	L 26–39	9–5 (1–2)	Men's Gym; Los Angeles, CA
		at California	L 31–46	9–6 (1–3)	Men's Gym; Berkeley, CA
		at California	L 28–39	9–7 (1–4)	Men's Gym; Berkeley, CA
		USC	L 22–39	9–8 (1–5)	Men's Gym; Los Angeles, CA
		at Stanford	L 28–31	9–9 (1–6)	Stanford Pavilion; Stanford, CA
		at Stanford	L 34–39	9–10 (1–7)	Stanford Pavilion; Stanford, CA
		California	L 30–42	9–11 (1–8)	Men's Gym; Los Angeles, CA
		California	W 40–38	10–11 (2–8)	Men's Gym; Los Angeles, CA
		USC	L 21–46	10–12 (2–9)	Men's Gym; Los Angeles, CA
		USC	L 23–32	10–13 (2–10)	Men's Gym; Los Angeles, CA
*Non-conference game. ^{#}Rankings from AP Poll. (#) Tournament seedings in parentheses. All times are in Pacific Time.
