= 1933–34 Iowa State Cyclones men's basketball team =

American college basketball season

1933–34 Iowa State Cyclones men's basketball
- Conference: Big Six Conference
- Record: 6–11 (2–8 Big Six)
- Head coach: Louis Menze (6th season)
- Home arena: State Gymnasium

1933–34 Big Six Conference men's basketball standings
	Conf.				Overall
Team	W		L	PCT	W		L	PCT
Kansas	9	–	1	.900	16	–	1	.941
Missouri	6	–	4	.600	10	–	8	.556
Oklahoma	6	–	4	.600	10	–	8	.556
Nebraska	5	–	5	.500	7	–	11	.389
Iowa State	2	–	8	.200	6	–	11	.353
Kansas State	2	–	8	.200	3	–	15	.167

The 1933–34 Iowa State Cyclones men's basketball team represented Iowa State University during the 1933–34 NCAA men's basketball season. The Cyclones were coached by Louis Menze, who was in his sixth season with the Cyclones. They played their home games at the State Gymnasium in Ames, Iowa.

They finished the season 6–11, 2–8 in Big Six play to finish in fifth place.

== Roster ==
1933–34 Iowa State Cyclones men's basketball team
Players
Coaches

Pos.	#	Name	Height	Weight	Year	Hometown
F	8	Chester Anderson	—	—	So	Burlington, Iowa
		Homer Batman	—	—		Ames, Iowa
	12	John Cowan	—	—		Crystal Lake, Illinois
F		Jack Cowen	—	—	So	Packwood, Iowa
		Clark Craghead	—	—		Kansas City, Missouri
F		Ed Doty	—	—	Jr	Dallas City, Illinois
		Louis Eubanks	—	—		Des Moines, Iowa
		Glenn Fitch	—	—		Des Moines, Iowa
		Howard Frazer	—	—		Ottumwa, Iowa
		Merle Garber	—	—		Ames, Iowa
		John Hargreaves	—	—		Algona, Iowa
		Bob Hawley	—	—		Ames, Iowa
G		Torvald Holmes	—	—	So	Ames, Iowa
G	11	Frank Hood	—	—		Creston, Iowa
		Joe Norman	—	—		Ames, Iowa
		Vincent Pemble	—	—		Indianola, Iowa
		Max Peterson	—	—		Wataga, Illinois
		Herbert Shoemaker	—	—		Waterloo, Iowa
		Ronald Sieben	—	—		Geneseo, Illinois
		Dick Sweitzer	—	—		Cedar Rapids, Iowa
		Robert Templer	—	—		Miamisburg, Ohio
C	14	Waldo Wegner (C)	6 ft 4 in (1.93 m)	200 lb (91 kg)	Jr	Everly, Iowa

Head coach

- Louis Menze

Assistant coach(es)

Legend

- (C) Team captain
- (S) Suspended
- (I) Ineligible
- (W) Walk-on
- Injured
- Current redshirt

== Schedule and results ==
Date time, TV	Rank^{#}	Opponent^{#}	Result	Record	Site city, state
Regular season
December 11, 1933*		at Iowa; Cy-Hawk Rivalry	L 12–30	0–1	Iowa Field House (7,000); Iowa City, Iowa
December 12, 1933*		at Coe	W 27–22	1–1	Coe Fieldhouse; Cedar Rapids, Iowa
December 16, 1933*		Grinnell	W 28–19	2–1	State Gymnasium; Ames, Iowa
December 21, 1933*; 8:15 pm		at Drake; Iowa Big Four	W 28–25	3–1	Drake Fieldhouse; Des Moines, Iowa
January 2, 1934*		Drake; Iowa Big Four	W 29–19	4–1	State Gymnasium; Ames, Iowa
January 5, 1934		Nebraska	L 31–37	4–2 (0–1)	State Gymnasium; Ames, Iowa
January 12, 1934		at Kansas State	L 23–38	4–3 (0–2)	Nichols Hall; Manhattan, Kansas
January 13, 1934		at Oklahoma	L 20–43	4–4 (0–3)	OU Field House; Norman, Oklahoma
January 18, 1934; 7:15 pm		Missouri	L 25–26	4–5 (0–4)	State Gymnasium; Ames, Iowa
January 24, 1934; 7:15 pm		Kansas	L 23–31	4–6 (0–5)	State Gymnasium; Ames, Iowa
February 10, 1934		Oklahoma	W 43–20	5–6 (1–5)	State Gymnasium; Ames, Iowa
February 16, 1934		at Kansas	L 23–25	5–7 (1–6)	Hoch Auditorium; Lawrence, Kansas
February 17, 1934*		at Rockhurst	L 26–35	5–8	Kansas City, Missouri
February 19, 1934		at Missouri	L 19–25	5–9 (1–7)	Brewer Fieldhouse; Columbia, Missouri
February 24, 1934		at Nebraska	L 21–26	5–10 (1–8)	Nebraska Coliseum; Lincoln, Nebraska
February 26, 1934*		at Creighton	L 33–46	5–11	University Gym; Omaha, Nebraska
March 1, 1934		Kansas State	W 37–16	6–11 (2–8)	State Gymnasium; Ames, Iowa
*Non-conference game. ^{#}Rankings from AP poll. (#) Tournament seedings in parentheses. All times are in Central Time.
