= 1933–34 Kansas Jayhawks men's basketball team =

American college basketball season

1933–34 Kansas Jayhawks men's basketball

Big Six Champions
- Conference: Big Six Conference
- Record: 16–1 (9–1 Big 6)
- Head coach: Phog Allen (17th season)
- Captain: Paul Harrington
- Home arena: Hoch Auditorium

1933–34 Big Six Conference men's basketball standings
	Conf.				Overall
Team	W		L	PCT	W		L	PCT
Kansas	9	–	1	.900	16	–	1	.941
Missouri	6	–	4	.600	10	–	8	.556
Oklahoma	6	–	4	.600	10	–	8	.556
Nebraska	5	–	5	.500	7	–	11	.389
Iowa State	2	–	8	.200	6	–	11	.353
Kansas State	2	–	8	.200	3	–	15	.167

The 1933–34 Kansas Jayhawks Men's Basketball Team represented the University of Kansas during the 1933–34 college men's basketball season.

== Roster ==
- Theodore O'Leary
- Leland Page
- William Johnson
- Ernest Vanek
- Elmer Schaake
- Paul Randall Harrington
- Robert Curd
- Fred Harris
- Gordon Gray
- Ray Ebling
- Lester Kappelman
- Wilmer Shaffer
- Dick Wells
- Milton Allen
- Robert Oyler

== Schedule ==
Date time, TV	Rank^{#}	Opponent^{#}	Result	Record	Site city, state
December 12		Kansas State; Sunflower Showdown	W 27–13	1-0	Hoch Auditorium; Lawrence, KS
December 15		at Kansas State; Sunflower Showdown	W 34–20	2-0	Nichols Hall; Manhattan, KS
December 21*		at Warrensburg	W 41–25	3-0	Warrensburg, MO
January 1*		at Kansas Wesleyan	W 37–22	4-0	Salina, KS
January 9		at Nebraska	L 21–24	4-1 (0-1)	Nebraska Coliseum; Lincoln, NE
January 10		at Missouri; Border War	W 27–25	5-1 (1-1)	Brewer Fieldhouse; Columbia, MO
January 20		Kansas State; Sunflower Showdown	W 32–24	6-1 (2-1)	Hoch Auditorium; Lawrence, KS
January 24		at Iowa State	W 31–23	7-1 (3-1)	State Gymnasium; Ames, IA
February 3*		at Washburn	W 31–22	8-1	Topeka, KS
February 8		Oklahoma	W 22–16	9-1	Hoch Auditorium; Lawrence, KS
February 9		Oklahoma	W 28–23	10-1 (4-1)	Hoch Auditorium; Lawrence, KS
February 16		Iowa State	W 26–23	11-1 (5-1)	Hoch Auditorium; Lawrence, KS
February 19		Nebraska	W 25–24	12-1 (6-1)	Hoch Auditorium; Lawrence, KS
February 24		at Kansas State; Sunflower Showdown	W 39–23	13-1 (7-1)	Nichols Hall; Manhattan, KS
March 1		at Oklahoma	W 33–26	14-1	Field House; Norman, OK
March 2		at Oklahoma	W 39–25	15-1 (8-1)	Field House; Norman, OK
March 6		Missouri; Border War	W 23–21	16-1 (9-1)	Hoch Auditorium; Lawrence, KS
*Non-conference game. ^{#}Rankings from AP Poll. (#) Tournament seedings in parentheses.
