= 1933–34 Cincinnati Bearcats men's basketball team =

American college basketball season

1933–34 Cincinnati Bearcats men's basketball
- Conference: Buckeye Athletic Association
- Record: 12–7 (6–4 BAA)
- Head coach: Tay Brown (1st season)
- Captain: Olen Grandle
- Home arena: Schmidlapp Gymnasium

The 1933–34 Cincinnati Bearcats men's basketball team represented the University of Cincinnati during the 1933–34 NCAA men's basketball season. The head coach was Tay Brown, coaching his first season with the Bearcats. The team finished with an overall record of 12–7.

== Schedule ==
Date time, TV	Opponent	Result	Record	Site city, state
December 11	Transylvania	W 73–22	1–0	Schmidlapp Gymnasium; Cincinnati, OH
December 15	Georgetown (KY)	W 52–17	2–0	Schmidlapp Gymnasium; Cincinnati, OH
December 16	at Kentucky	L 25–31	2–1	Alumni Gymnasium; Lexington, KY
December 22	at Hanover	L 15–34	3–1	Hanover, IN
December 28	Wilmington	L 22–25 ^{OT}	3–2	Schmidlapp Gymnasium; Cincinnati, OH
December 30	Alumni	W 60–38	4–2	Schmidlapp Gymnasium; Cincinnati, OH
January 5	Hanover	L 33–34	4–3	Schmidlapp Gymnasium; Cincinnati, OH
January 6	at Marshall	L 25–35	4–4	Huntington, WV
January 13	Wittenberg	W 56–36	5–4	Schmidlapp Gymnasium; Cincinnati, OH
January 20	Ohio Wesleyan	L 31–36	5–5	Schmidlapp Gymnasium; Cincinnati, OH
January 27	Ohio	L 36–38	5–6	Schmidlapp Gymnasium; Cincinnati, OH
February 3	at Miami (OH)	W 35–30	6–6	Oxford, OH
February 5	at Denison	W 37–33	7–6	Granville, OH
February 10	at Ohio Wesleyan	L 29–45	7–7	Delaware, OH
February 14	at Wittenberg	W 38–34	8–7	Springfield, OH
February 17	Marshall	W 41–32	9–7	Schmidlapp Gymnasium; Cincinnati, OH
February 20	at Ohio	W 33–30	10–7	Men's Gymnasium; Athens, OH
February 23	Denison	W 43–34	11–7	Schmidlapp Gymnasium; Cincinnati, OH
February 26	Miami (OH)	W 43–33	12–7	Schmidlapp Gymnasium; Cincinnati, OH
*Non-conference game. (#) Tournament seedings in parentheses.
