= 1933–34 Indiana Hoosiers men's basketball team =

American college basketball season

1933–34 Indiana Hoosiers men's basketball
- Conference: Big Ten Conference
- Record: 13–7 (6–6 Big Ten)
- Head coach: Everett Dean (10th season)
- Captain: Woodrow Weir
- Home arena: The Fieldhouse

1933–34 Big Ten Conference men's basketball standings
	Conf.				Overall
Team	W		L	PCT	W		L	PCT
Purdue	10	–	2	.833	17	–	3	.850
Wisconsin	8	–	4	.667	14	–	6	.700
Northwestern	8	–	4	.667	11	–	8	.579
Illinois	7	–	5	.583	13	–	6	.684
Iowa	6	–	6	.500	13	–	7	.650
Indiana	6	–	6	.500	13	–	7	.650
Minnesota	5	–	7	.417	9	–	11	.450
Ohio State	4	–	8	.333	8	–	12	.400
Michigan	4	–	8	.333	6	–	14	.300
Chicago	2	–	10	.167	5	–	15	.250

The 1933–34 Indiana Hoosiers men's basketball team represented Indiana University. Their head coach was Everett Dean, who was in his 10th year. The team played its home games in The Fieldhouse in Bloomington, Indiana, and was a member of the Big Ten Conference.

The Hoosiers finished the regular season with an overall record of 13–7 and a conference record of 6–6, finishing 5th in the Big Ten Conference.

== Roster ==
No.	Name	Position	Ht.	Year	Hometown
4	Wendel Walker	G	5–11	So.	Vincennes, Indiana
5	Vern Huffman	C	6–2	So.	New Castle, Indiana
7	Lester Stout	F	5–9	So.	Winamac, Indiana
11	Charles Scott	G	6–2	So.	Jeffersonville, Indiana
14	Fred Fechtman	C	6–8	Fr.	Indianapolis, Indiana
18	Woodrow Weir	F	5–10	Sr.	Scottsburg, Indiana
N/A	Keith Campbell	G	5–10	Jr.	Logansport, Indiana
N/A	Gilbert Carter	G	5–8	N/A	Indianapolis, Indiana
N/A	William Coulter	C	6–3	Jr.	Paoli, Indiana
N/A	Joe Gansinger	F	6–1	N/A	East Chicago, Indiana
N/A	Floyd Henry	F	5–10	Jr.	Kendallville, Indiana
N/A	Willard Kehrt	F	5–11	Jr.	Shelbyville, Indiana
N/A	Robert Porter	G	6–1	Jr.	Logansport, Indiana
N/A	Halary Sawicki	C	6–3	Sr.	Georgetown, Illinois

== Schedule/results ==
Date time, TV	Rank^{#}	Opponent^{#}	Result	Record	Site city, state
Regular season
12/7/1933*		Franklin College	W 20–16	1–0	The Fieldhouse; Bloomington, Indiana
12/10/1933*		DePauw	W 24–16	2–0	The Fieldhouse; Bloomington, Indiana
12/16/1933*		at Wabash	L 22–26	2–1	Crawfordsville, Indiana
12/17/1933*		at Saint Louis	W 47–32	3–1	West Pine Gym; St. Louis, Missouri
12/27/1933*		at Marshall	W 36–20	4–1	Huntington, West Virginia
12/28/1933*		at Maryland	W 30–17	5–1	Ritchie Coliseum; College Park, Maryland
12/30/1933*		at Temple	W 43–29	6–1	Philadelphia
1/8/1934		Michigan	W 29–18	7–1 (1–0)	The Fieldhouse; Bloomington, Indiana
1/13/1934		Ohio State	W 38–22	8–1 (2–0)	The Fieldhouse; Bloomington, Indiana
1/15/1934		Purdue; Rivalry	L 13–47	8–2 (2–1)	The Fieldhouse; Bloomington, Indiana
1/20/1934		at Ohio State	L 23–27	8–3 (2–2)	Ohio Expo Center Coliseum; Columbus, Ohio
2/3/1934*		at Wabash	W 32–28	9–3 (2–2)	The Fieldhouse; Bloomington, Indiana
2/5/1934		Iowa	W 34–25	10–3 (3–2)	The Fieldhouse; Bloomington, Indiana
2/10/1934		at Illinois; Rivalry	L 25–28	10–4 (3–3)	Huff Hall; Champaign, Illinois
2/12/1934		at Chicago	W 30–28	11–4 (4–3)	Henry Crown Field House; Chicago
2/17/1934		at Iowa	L 26–29	11–5 (4–4)	Iowa Field House; Iowa City, IA
2/24/1934		Illinois; Rivalry	W 36–24	12–5 (5–4)	The Fieldhouse; Bloomington, Indiana
2/26/1934		Chicago	W 39–30	13–5 (6–4)	The Fieldhouse; Bloomington, Indiana
3/3/1934		at Purdue; Rivalry	L 28–55	13–6 (6–5)	Lafayette Jefferson HS Gymnasium; West Lafayette, Indiana
3/5/1934		at Michigan	L 32–35	13–7 (6–6)	Yost Field House; Ann Arbor, Michigan
*Non-conference game. ^{#}Rankings from AP Poll. (#) Tournament seedings in parentheses.
