= 1934 SEC men's basketball tournament =

- Classification: Division I
- Teams: 12
- Site: Atlanta Athletic Club; Atlanta, Georgia
- Champions: Alabama (1st title)
- Winning coach: Hank Crisp (1st title)

1933–34 Southeastern Conference men's basketball standings
	Conf.				Overall
Team	W		L	PCT	W		L	PCT
Kentucky	11	–	0	1.000	16	–	1	.941
Alabama †	13	–	2	.867	16	–	2	.889
LSU	13	–	3	.813	13	–	4	.765
Florida	4	–	2	.667	11	–	7	.611
Vanderbilt	8	–	5	.615	11	–	6	.647
Tulane	8	–	10	.444	10	–	10	.500
Georgia Tech	5	–	8	.385	6	–	12	.333
Tennessee	3	–	5	.375	10	–	7	.588
Mississippi State	4	–	8	.333	8	–	11	.421
Georgia	3	–	6	.333	10	–	9	.526
Ole Miss	2	–	8	.200	7	–	9	.438
Auburn	2	–	9	.182	2	–	11	.154
Sewanee	0	–	10	.000	0	–	13	.000
† Regular-season championship and 1934 SEC Tournament winner

The 1934 Southeastern Conference men's basketball tournament took place on February 23–27, 1934 in Atlanta, Georgia at the Atlanta Athletic Club. It was the second SEC basketball tournament.

Alabama won the tournament by beating Florida in the championship game.

In the first round, undefeated Kentucky was upset by Florida. Believing it was unfair to not award a regular season conference championship separate from the tournament, coach Adolph Rupp announced Kentucky would not play in the 1935 tournament, ensuring the conference would not reverse its previous decision to cancel it.

== Bracket ==
First Round
Georgia	33
Georgia Tech	19
Tennessee	43
Auburn	26

Quarterfinals
Florida	38
Kentucky	32
Vanderbilt	46
Georgia	29
Alabama	37
Mississippi State	25
LSU	35
Tennessee	42

Semifinals
Florida	24
Vanderbilt	23
Alabama	29
Tennessee	26

Finals
Florida	25
Alabama	41

== All-Tournament Team ==
=== First Team ===
- John DeMoisey, Kentucky
- Jimmy Walker, Alabama
- Jim Whatley, Alabama
- Jim Hughes, Florida
- Bill Davis, Kentucky

=== Second Team ===
- Dave McPherson, Tennessee
- Willie Geny, Vanderbilt
- Bob Warner, Florida
- Earl Bauman, Alabama
- Welcome Shearer, Florida
