= Ed Mullen =

American basketball player

Personal information
- Born: March 9, 1913 Fond du Lac, Wisconsin, U.S.
- Died: January 10, 1988 (aged 74) San Francisco, California, U.S.
- Listed height: 6 ft 3 in (1.91 m)
- Listed weight: 185 lb (84 kg)

Career information
- High school: Fond du Lac (Fond du Lac, Wisconsin)
- College: Marquette (1931–1934)
- Position: Guard

Career history

Playing
- 1934–1935: Milwaukee Goodyears
- 1935–1940: Oshkosh All-Stars

Coaching
- 1946–1947: Milwaukee Shooting Stars

Career highlights
- First-team All-American – Converse (1934)

Joseph Edward Mullen (March 9, 1913 – January 10, 1988) was an American professional basketball player. He played in the National Basketball League for the Oshkosh All-Stars and averaged 1.9 points per game. He also coached the Milwaukee Shooting Stars, an independent team, for the 1946–47 season.

After his professional basketball career, Mullen became an attorney in Washington, D.C., and eventually moved to San Francisco, California to work for the United States Department of Veterans Affairs. He died from an aneurysm.

== Career statistics ==
Legend
GP	Games played	FGM	Field goals made
FTM	Free throws made	FTA	Free throws attempted
FT%	Free throw percentage	PTS	Total points
PPG	Points per game	**Bold**	Career high

=== NBL ===
==== Regular season ====
Year	Team	GP	FGM	FTM	PTS	PPG
1937–38	Oshkosh	9	8	0	16	1.8
1938–39	Oshkosh	**26**	**25**	**11**	**61**	**2.3**
1939–40	Oshkosh	7	1	2	4	.6
Career		42	34	13	81	1.9

==== Playoffs ====
Year	Team	GP	FGM	FTM	PTS	PPG
1938	Oshkosh	**5**	**1**	**6**	**8**	**1.6**
1939	Oshkosh	**5**	0	3	3	.6
Career		10	1	9	11	1.1
