= Frank Baird =

American basketball player

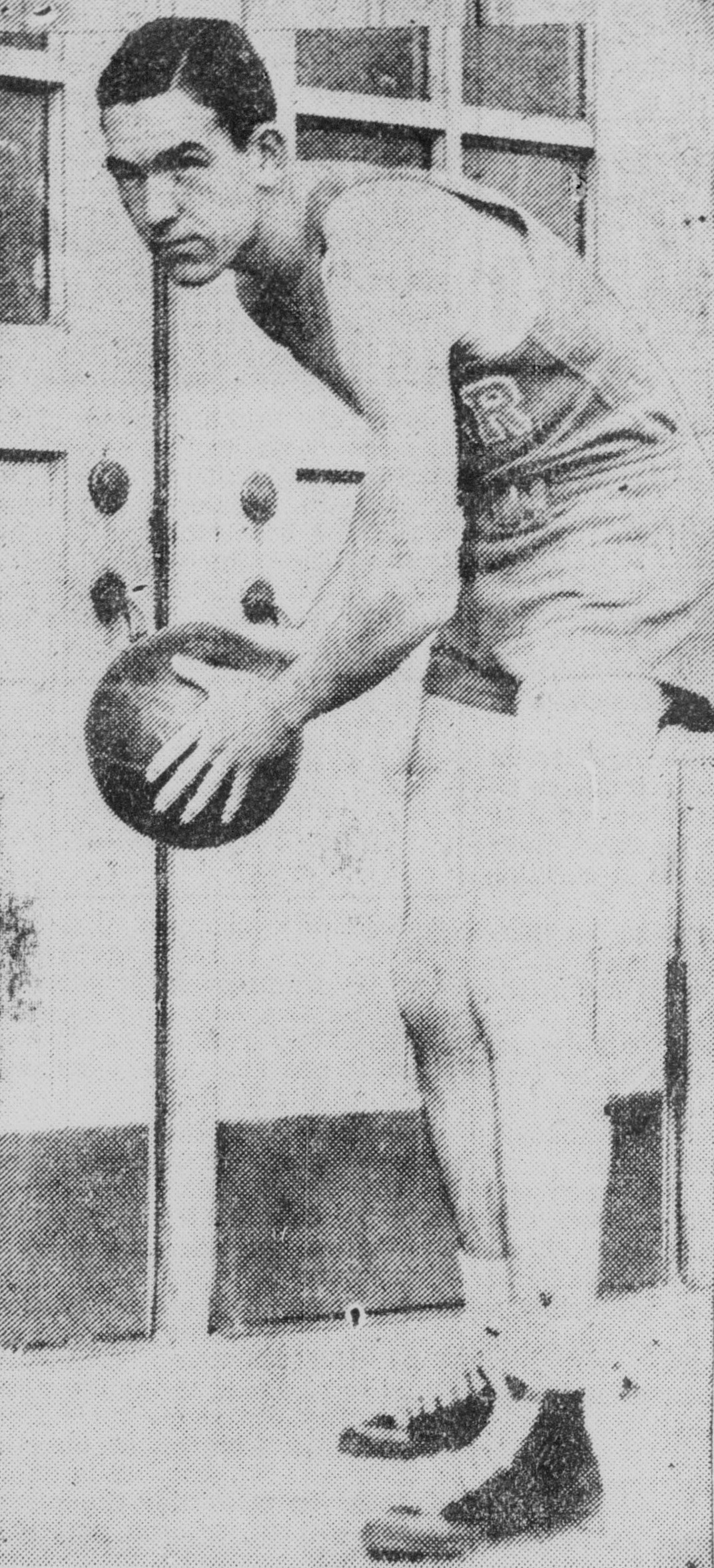
- Baird, circa 1934

Personal information
- Born: April 10, 1912 Toledo, Ohio, U.S.
- Died: March 20, 2007 (aged 94) Goshen, Indiana, U.S.
- Listed height: 5 ft 11 in (1.80 m)
- Listed weight: 160 lb (73 kg)

Career information
- High school: Arsenal Tech (Indianapolis, Indiana)
- College: Butler (1931–1934)
- Playing career: 1937–1942
- Position: Guard / forward

Career history
- 1937–1940 1941–1942: Indianapolis Kautskys

Career highlights
- First-team All-American – Helms (1933); Third-team All-American – Literary Digest (1934); 2× First-team All-MVC (1933, 1934)

Frank Atwood Baird (April 10, 1912 – March 20, 2007) was an American basketball player. An early professional in the National Basketball League, he was also an All-American college player at Butler University. Baird played both baseball and basketball at Butler. He then played several years for the Indianapolis Kautskys, averaging 5.1 points per game for his career.

Following his playing career, Baird coached basketball at Broad Ripple High School in Indianapolis. He also officiated college football from 1940 through 1974, including some Tangerine Bowl and Grantland Rice Bowl games. He has been named to the Indiana Basketball Hall of Fame, the Indiana Football Hall of Fame, the Indiana Baseball Hall of Fame and the Butler Athletic Hall of Fame.
