= Jerry Nemer =

American lawyer

- Nemer as a lawyer, c. 1950s
- Born: Jerome Nemer; January 7, 1912; Evansville, Indiana, U.S.
- Died: December 7, 1980 (aged 68)
- Education: University of Southern California
- Occupation: Lawyer
- Employer(s): Buchalter, Nemer, Fields and Younger

Jerome Nemer (January 7, 1912 – December 7, 1980) was an American athlete and attorney. He played college basketball at the University of Southern California (USC) where he became the first Jew to captain a major athletic team at that school. After basketball, Nemer practiced law in the Los Angeles area and was a partner in the firm Buchalter, Nemer, Fields and Younger.

== Early life and education ==
Nemer was born in Evansville, Indiana in 1912 and moved to Southern California as a baby. He was an All-City basketball player for Los Angeles High School. He enrolled at USC in the fall of 1929 to play for the basketball and baseball teams. Sam Barry, who coached both sports, felt that the basketball team needed more help, so Nemer quit baseball to focus on basketball. Nemer also became the first Jew to captain a major athletic team during his time at USC.

=== Basketball career ===
Nemer earned three varsity letters while playing with the basketball team from 1930–31 through 1932–33. In 1930–31, his sophomore year, he averaged 7.8 points per game in league play, which was the 10th highest average in the Pacific Coast Conference (PCC). As a junior the following year, Nemer averaged 12.0 points per game and was named to the PCC South Division First Team as well as USC's most valuable player. Nemer had a breakout senior season in 1932–33. He guided the Trojans to an overall record of 18–5 (10–1 in conference) as they won the PCC South Division title. They lost to Oregon, the winners of the North Division, in a best-of-three championship series to decide the conference's outright winner. Although he averaged only 9.0 points per game, Nemer was voted as a consensus NCAA All-American.

After college, Nemer played basketball in the Amateur Athletic Union (AAU) for the Firestone Non-Skids for several years. He became an AAU basketball referee in 1942.

In 1994 he was inducted into the Southern California Jewish Sports Hall of Fame.

=== Legal career ===
In 1948 Nemer formed a law firm with Irwin Buchalter and Murray Fields called Buchalter, Nemer, Fields and Younger. During his time at the firm he became a well-known attorney. In one such case he handled, Nemer agreed to defend a man who had been arrested for plotting to kill him. The defendant received a $2,000 fine and probation. Nemer helped grow the law firm which by 2002 had 140 practicing attorneys in the Los Angeles area.

== Personal life ==
Nemer died in December 1980 after battling leukemia. To commemorate his life, USC created the Jerome Nemer Lecture Series. The series was created to explore Jewish thinkers' contributions to Western life.
