= Don Smith (basketball, born 1910) =

American basketball player

Personal information
- Born: October 18, 1910
- Died: January 27, 1994 (aged 83) Pittsburgh, Pennsylvania, U.S.
- Listed height: 6 ft 0 in (1.83 m)
- Listed weight: 170 lb (77 kg)

Career information
- High school: Bellevue (Bellevue, Pennsylvania)
- College: Pittsburgh (1930–1933)
- Playing career: 1933–1944
- Position: Guard

Career history
- 1933–1934: McKeesport Willigs
- 1934–1937: Pittsburgh Willigs
- 1935–1936: McKeesport Big Five
- 1937–1938: Pittsburgh Pirates
- 1938: Akron Firestone Non-Skids
- 1938–1939: McKeesport Big Five
- 1939–1940: Pittsburgh North Side
- 1940–1941: Pittsburgh Pirates
- 1941–1942: Pittsburgh Young Republicans
- 1942–1944: Pittsburgh Corbetts

Career highlights
- Consensus All-American (1933)

Donald Heddaeus Smith (October 18, 1910 – January 27, 1994) was an American college basketball player who played for the University of Pittsburgh during the 1930s. He played the guard position and was 6 ft 0 in (1.83 m) tall. He was voted as a consensus NCAA All-American as a senior in 1932–33 after guiding the Panthers to their second consecutive Eastern Intercollegiate Conference championship. Smith, who was from Bellevue, Pennsylvania, was known for his quick basketball instincts. After retirement, he became a dentist in the Pittsburgh area.
