= Half Acre Gym =

University of Wyoming building

Half Acre Recreation and Wellness Center
- Interactive map of Half Acre Recreation and Wellness Center
- Former names: Half Acre Gym
- Location: Laramie, Wyoming, U.S.
- Coordinates: 41°18′46″N 105°34′44″W
- Owner: University of Wyoming
- Operator: University of Wyoming
- Capacity: 4,000

Construction
- Groundbreaking: 1923
- Opened: January 25, 1928
- Renovated: 2014
- Cost: $150,000

Tenant
- Wyoming Cowboys men's basketball (1928–1951)

The Half Acre Recreation and Wellness Center (formerly Half Acre Gym) is currently the recreation center for the University of Wyoming.

It was originally a 4,000-seat multi-purpose arena in Laramie, in the U.S. state of Wyoming. It opened in 1928.

== History ==
It was home to the University of Wyoming Cowboys basketball team from 1928 until 1951 when it was replaced by the War Memorial Fieldhouse. The size of the arena was about a half acre, hence its name. When it opened, it was one of the nation's largest indoor arenas.

The venue is currently a recreation center on the campus of the University of Wyoming. In 2012, the university announced a $27 million renovation to begin in the Spring of 2013, and be completed by the Fall of 2014. The project was completed in two phases. Phase One would consist of the demolition and recreation of the east portion of the building, and Phase Two would include the reopening of the east portion, and the closure and construction of the west portion which is the historical section of the building. Throughout the renovation, the university hoped to keep and incorporate as much of the historical structure and facade as possible.

The improvements, according to the University of Wyoming's web site, included elevators, added classrooms, a space for athletic training, new racquetball courts, a climbing wall for bouldering, a dance studio, athletics track, and new locker rooms with access to the pool. The pool closed on December 20, 2023 after 100 years of operation with all aquatic activities relocating to the pool at the John Corbett Building.

== Amenities ==
=== Aquatics ===
- Pool area

=== Corbett gym and pool ===
- Corbett gym – basketball/volleyball courts and badminton courts
- Corbett pool – 25 yard by 25 meter L-shaped pool with a diving well

=== Historic gym ===
- basketball/volleyball courts
- badminton courts

=== MAC gym ===
- basketball/volleyball courts
- badminton courts
- Indoor soccer/Futsal
- racquetball courts with convertible squash court

=== Miscellaneous ===
- 1/8 mile, four-lane track
