= Moose Krause =

American football, basketball, and baseball player

Biographical details
- Born: February 2, 1913; Chicago, Illinois, U.S.
- Died: December 11, 1992 (aged 79); South Bend, Indiana, U.S.

Playing career

Football
- 1931–1933: Notre Dame

Basketball
- 1931–1934: Notre Dame
- Positions: Tackle (football); Center (basketball)

Coaching career (HC unless noted)

Football
- 1934–1938: Saint Mary's (MN)
- 1939–1941: Holy Cross (line)
- 1942–1943: Notre Dame (line)
- 1946–1947: Notre Dame (line)

Basketball
- 1934–1939: Saint Mary's (MN)
- 1939–1942: Holy Cross
- 1943–1944: Notre Dame
- 1946–1951: Notre Dame

Baseball
- 1937–1939: Saint Mary's (MN)

Administrative career (AD unless noted)
- 1934–1939: Saint Mary's (MN)
- 1948–1949: Notre Dame (assistant AD)
- 1949–1981: Notre Dame

Head coaching record
- Overall: 8–29–4 (football); 155–114 (basketball); 16–16 (baseball)

Accomplishments and honors

Awards
- Second-team All-American (1932); 3× Basketball All-American (1932–1934); Walter Camp Man of the Year (1976); NFF Distinguished American Award (1989)
- Basketball Hall of Fame; Inducted in 1976 (profile)
- College Basketball Hall of Fame; Inducted in 2006

Edward Walter "Moose" Krause (born Edward Walter Kriaučiūnas; Lithuanian: Edvardas Valteris Kriaučiūnas; February 2, 1913 – December 11, 1992) was an American football, basketball, and baseball player, track athlete, coach, and college athletics administrator. He lettered in four sports at the University of Notre Dame, where he was a three-time consensus All-American in basketball (1932–1934). Krause served as the head basketball coach at Saint Mary's College in Winona, Minnesota, now Saint Mary's University of Minnesota, from 1934 to 1939, at the College of the Holy Cross from 1939 to 1942, and at Notre Dame from 1943 to 1944 and 1946 to 1951, compiling a career college basketball record of 155–114. He was Notre Dame's athletic director from 1949 to 1981. Krause was inducted into the Naismith Memorial Basketball Hall of Fame in 1976 and the College Basketball Hall of Fame in 2006.

== Early life and playing career ==
Born Edward Walter Kriaučiūnas in Chicago to Lithuanian immigrant parents, Krause grew up in the Town of Lake section or, as it was once known as, Back of the Yards. His brother, Feliksas Kriaučiūnas, was the captain of Lithuania national basketball team in 1937. His surname was shortened to Krause by his high school football coach, who could not pronounce Kriaučiūnas (Lithuanian pronunciation: [krɪ.ɐutɕɪˈuːnɐs]).

At the University of Notre Dame, Krause competed in track, baseball, football and basketball, becoming the first Notre Dame player to make the halls of fame of both basketball and football. In basketball, he was a three-time consensus All-American, in 1932, 1933, and 1934. Krause played football for the Fighting Irish under Hunk Anderson. He graduated cum laude from Notre Dame with a journalism degree in 1934 .

== Coaching career ==
Krause's coaching career included a five-year stint as head coach in all sports at Saint Mary's College in Winona, Minnesota, now Saint Mary's University of Minnesota; an assistant football coach at the College of the Holy Cross and the University of Notre Dame for ten years; and head basketball coach at the University of Notre Dame in 1943 and again from 1946 to 1951, when he compiled a record of 98–48 (.671). As acting head football coach at Notre Dame, filling in for an ailing Frank Leahy, Krause was 3–0.

== Military service ==
Krause served in the United States Marines during World War II including a 14-month stretch as an air combat intelligence officer in the South Pacific.

== Administrative career ==
Krause became the assistant athletic director at Notre Dame in 1948. In March 1949, he was named athletic director, succeeding Frank Leahy, who stepped down from the role to focus on his post as head football coach.

== Later years ==
Krause died on December 11, 1992, at his home in South Bend, Indiana. He was buried in the Cedar Grove Cemetery in Notre Dame, Indiana.

== Head coaching record ==
=== Football ===
Year	Team	Overall	Conference	Standing	Bowl/playoffs
Saint Mary's Redmen (Minnesota Intercollegiate Athletic Conference) (1934–1938)
1934	Saint Mary's	4–3–2	2–2–1	6th	
1935	Saint Mary's	2–6	0–5	8th	
1936	Saint Mary's	1–8	1–3	T–5th	
1937	Saint Mary's	1–4–2	1–2–1	T–5th	
1938	Saint Mary's	0–7	0–5	T–7th	
Saint Mary's:		8–29–4	4–17–2		
Total:		8–29–4			
