= Hal Lee (basketball) =

American basketball player (1910–1977)

Personal information
- Born: October 7, 1910 Thief River Falls, Minnesota
- Died: October 16, 1977 (aged 67) Bremerton, Washington
- Listed height: 6 ft 3 in (1.91 m)
- Listed weight: 156 lb (71 kg)

Career information
- High school: Bremerton Union (Bremerton, Washington)
- College: Washington (1931–1934)
- Position: Point guard

Career highlights
- Consensus All-American (1934); 2× All-PCC (1933–1934)

Harold George Lee Sr. (October 7, 1910 – October 16, 1977) was an American college basketball player who played for the University of Washington during the 1930s. He played the point guard position at 6 ft 3 in (1.91 m) tall, making him one of the pioneers of being a tall player to play that position. He was voted as a consensus NCAA All-American as a senior in 1933–34 after guiding the Huskies to the Pacific Coast Conference championship. Lee also played for the football and baseball teams.
