= 1933–34 Idaho Vandals men's basketball team =

American college basketball season

1933–34 Idaho Vandals men's basketball
- Conference: Pacific Coast Conference
- Record: 16–13 (4–12 PCC)
- Head coach: Rich Fox (7th season)
- Assistant coach: Glenn Jacoby
- Home arena: Memorial Gymnasium

1933–34 Pacific Coast Conference men's basketball standings
	Conf.				Overall
Team	W		L	PCT	W		L	PCT
North
Washington †	14	–	2	.875	20	–	5	.800
Oregon	9	–	7	.563	17	–	8	.680
Oregon State	7	–	9	.438	14	–	10	.583
Washington State	6	–	10	.375	14	–	11	.560
Idaho	4	–	12	.250	16	–	13	.552
South
USC	9	–	3	.750	16	–	8	.667
California	8	–	4	.667	19	–	7	.731
Stanford	5	–	7	.417	8	–	12	.400
UCLA	2	–	10	.167	10	–	13	.435
† Conference playoff series winner

The 1933–34 Idaho Vandals men's basketball team represented the University of Idaho during the 1933–34 NCAA college basketball season. Members of the Pacific Coast Conference, the Vandals were led by seventh-year head coach Rich Fox and played their home games on campus at Memorial Gymnasium in Moscow, Idaho.

The Vandals were 16–13 overall and 4–12 in conference play.
