= Norman Cottom =

American basketball player

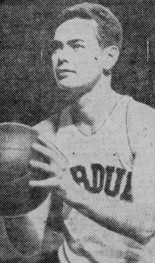

Personal information
- Born: March 12, 1912
- Died: July 1, 1972 (aged 60)

Career information
- High school: Wiley (Terre Haute, Indiana)
- College: Purdue (1932–1935)
- Position: Forward
- Number: 7

Career history
- 1935–1937: Indianapolis Kautskys

Career highlights
- Consensus All-American (1934); Third-team All-American – Converse (1935)

Norman Cottom (March 12, 1912 – July 1, 1972) was an American professional basketball player for the Indianapolis Kautskys in the National Basketball League for two seasons. A native of Terre Haute, Indiana, Cottom attended Wiley High School and earned four varsity letters playing for the basketball team. He led the Red Streaks to 3 IHSAA Sectionals and 1 Regionals, reaching the state semi-finals in 1931 His HS teammate, John Miklozek would become a star at Indiana State University. Cottom was also an all-state performer in football.

Cottom played college basketball at Purdue University under Piggy Lambert. He played on the varsity team for three seasons, and as a junior in 1933–34, Cottom led the Western Conference in scoring. He was named a consensus NCAA All-American at the end of the season.

After college, Cottom played for the Indianapolis Kautskys for two seasons and one season with the U.S. Navy Pre-Flight team. He moved into high school coaching in Alexandria and Terre Haute, Indiana (Gerstmeyer High and Wiley High) before moving to Fullerton, California to become chairman of Fullerton Union High School's social studies department. In 1978, Cottom was enshrined in the Indiana Basketball Hall of Fame.
