= Fred Fechtman =

American basketball player

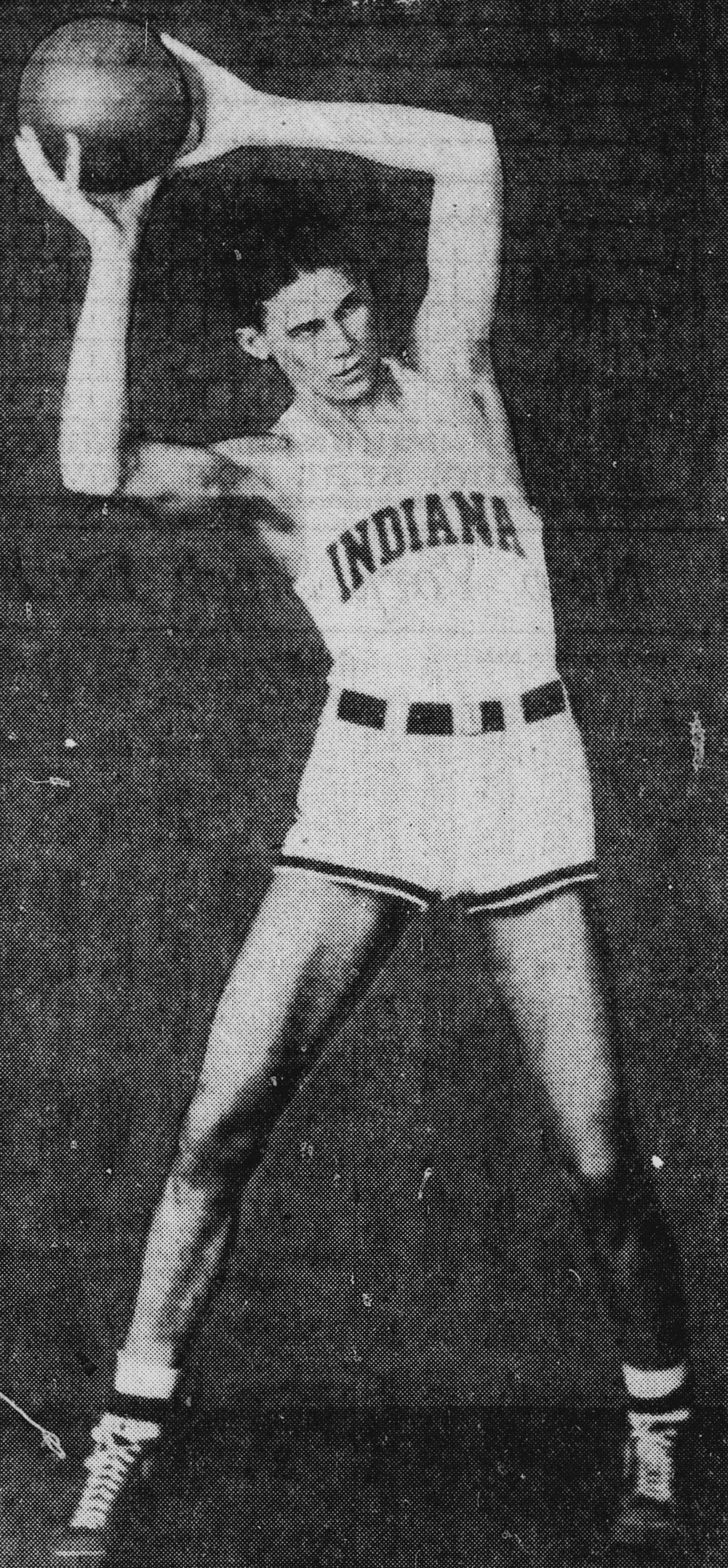
- Fechtman, circa 1936

Personal information
- Born: August 10, 1910 Indianapolis, Indiana
- Died: July 11, 1991 (aged 80) Indianapolis, Indiana
- Listed height: 6 ft 8 in (2.03 m)
- Listed weight: 210 lb (95 kg)

Career information
- College: Indiana (1933–1937)
- Position: Center

Career history

Playing
- 1937: Indianapolis Kautskys

Coaching
- 1943–1945: Greencastle HS

Frederick Daniel Fechtman (August 10, 1910 – July 11, 1991) was an American professional basketball player. He played in the National Basketball League for the Indianapolis Kautskys in three games during the 1937–38 season. Fechtman had never played an organized game of basketball before playing for Indiana University, and at the time he was enrolled he was the tallest person at the school. Later in life he became a high school coach and school superintendent.
