= Willard Witte =

American coach (1906–1966)

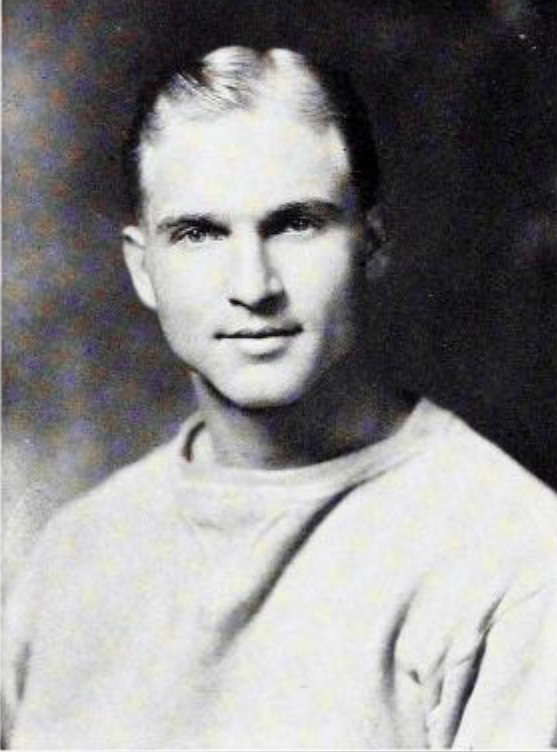
- Witte from the 1934 Wyo

Biographical details
- Born: April 3, 1906; Lincoln, Nebraska, U.S.
- Died: February 13, 1966 (aged 59); Fremont, Nebraska, U.S.

Playing career

Football
- 1927–1929: Nebraska

Basketball
- 1927–1930: Nebraska
- Positions: Halfback, quarterback (football)

Coaching career (HC unless noted)

Football
- 1933–1938: Wyoming

Basketball
- 1930–1939: Wyoming

Administrative career (AD unless noted)
- 1933–1939: Wyoming

Accomplishments and honors

Championships
- Basketball; Helms national (1934); 2 RMC (1932, 1934); 3 RMC East Division (1931, 1933, 1936)

Willard A. "Dutch" Witte (April 3, 1906 – February 13, 1966) was the head men's basketball and football coach of the University of Wyoming from 1930–31 through 1938–39 (basketball) and 1933 through 1938 (football). He led the Cowboys basketball team to an overall record of 134–51 in his tenure. His 1933–34 team, led by his younger brother and two-time consensus All-American Les Witte, finished 26–4 and were retroactively named national champions by the Helms Athletic Foundation. He died in 1966 at a hospital in Fremont, Nebraska. He also coached Wyoming to three division titles and two outright conference championships. He was inducted in the University of Wyoming Hall of Fame on September 12, 2003.

== Head coaching record ==
=== Football ===
Year	Team	Overall	Conference	Standing	Bowl/playoffs
Wyoming Cowboys (Rocky Mountain Conference) (1933–1937)
1933	Wyoming	2–6–1	1–6–1	11th	
1934	Wyoming	3–5	2–4	8th	
1935	Wyoming	4–4	3–4	T–7th	
1936	Wyoming	2–5–1	2–4–1	9th	
1937	Wyoming	3–5	2–4	T–7th	
Wyoming Cowboys (Mountain States Conference) (1938)
1938	Wyoming	2–5–1	1–4–1	6th	
Wyoming:		16–30–3	11–26–3		
Total:		16–30–3			

=== Basketball ===
Record table
Season	Team	Overall	Conference	Standing	Postseason
Wyoming Cowboys (Rocky Mountain Conference) (1930–1938)
1930–31	Wyoming	19–4	11–1	1st (East)	
1931–32	Wyoming	18–2	12–0	1st	
1932–33	Wyoming	18–5	12–2	1st (East)	
1933–34	Wyoming	26–4	14–0	1st	Helms National Champions
1934–35	Wyoming	11–5	10–4	2nd	
1935–36	Wyoming	12–7	11–3	1st (East)	
1936–37	Wyoming	8–9	7–7	6th	
1937–38	Wyoming	12–5	8–4	3rd	
Wyoming Cowboys (Mountain States Conference) (1938–1939)
1938–39	Wyoming	10–11	7–5	3rd	
Wyoming:		134–51	92–26		
Total:		134–51			
National champion Postseason invitational champion Conference regular season champion Conference regular season and conference tournament champion Division regular season champion Division regular season and conference tournament champion Conference tournament champion
