= USS S-14 =

S-class submarine of the United States

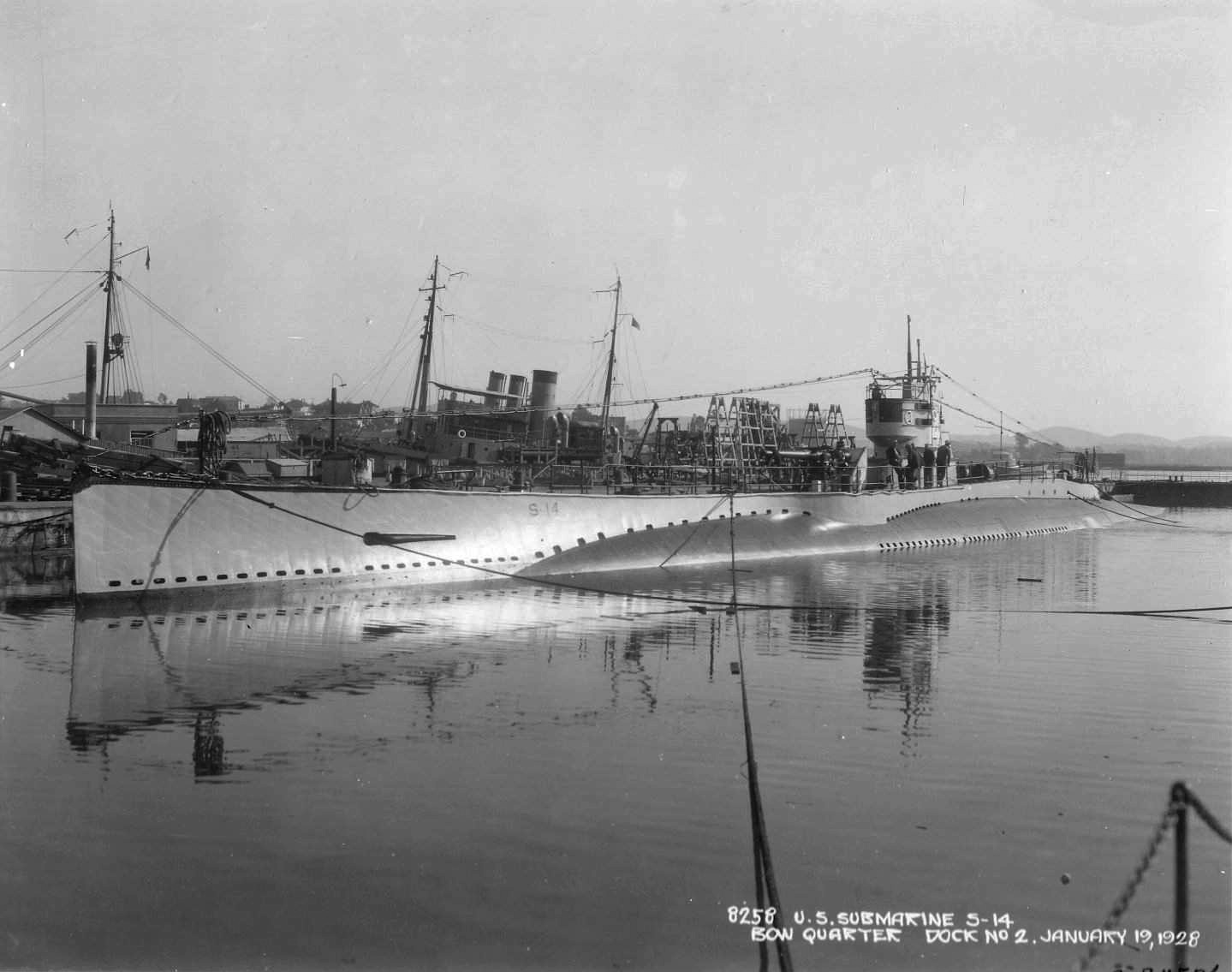
- USS S-14 (SS-119), at Dry Dock # 2 at Mare Island Navy Yard, California, 19 January 1928

History

United States
- Name: S-14
- Builder: Lake Torpedo Boat Company, Bridgeport, Connecticut
- Cost: $1,020,828.68 (hull and machinery)
- Laid down: 7 December 1917
- Launched: 22 October 1919
- Sponsored by: Mrs. Kathryn Parker
- Commissioned: 11 February 1921
- Decommissioned: 22 May 1935
- Recommissioned: 10 December 1940
- Decommissioned: 18 May 1945
- Stricken: 18 May 1945
- Identification: Hull symbol: SS-119; Call sign: NIMZ
- Fate: Sold for scrapping, 16 November 1945

General characteristics
- Class & type: S-3-class submarine
- Displacement: 875 long tons (889 t) surfaced; 1,088 long tons (1,105 t) submerged
- Length: 231 feet (70 m)
- Beam: 21 ft 10 in (6.65 m)
- Draft: 13 ft 1 in (3.99 m)
- Installed power: 1,400 brake horsepower (1,044 kW) diesel; 1,200 hp (895 kW) electric
- Propulsion: 2 × Busch-Sulzer 6M150 diesel engines; 2 × Westinghouse Electric Corporation electric motors; 2 × 60-cell batteries; 2 × Propellers
- Speed: 15 knots (28 km/h; 17 mph) surfaced; 11 kn (20 km/h; 13 mph) submerged
- Test depth: 200 ft (61 m)
- Capacity: 36,950 US gallons (139,900 L; 30,770 imp gal) fuel
- Complement: 4 officers; 34 enlisted
- Armament: 4 × Bow 21-inch (533 mm) torpedo tubes (12 torpedoes); 1 × Stern 21-in torpedo tube (2 torpedoes); 1 × 4-inch (102 mm)/50-caliber

USS S-14 (SS-119) was an S-3-class, also referred to as a "Government"-type, submarine of the United States Navy.

== Design ==
The "Government"-type had a length of 231 feet (70.4 m) overall, a beam of 21 ft 10 in (6.7 m), and a mean draft of 13 ft 1 in (4.0 m). They displaced 875 long tons (889 t) on the surface and 1,088 long tons (1,105 t) submerged. All S-class submarines had a crew of 4 officers and 34 enlisted men, when first commissioned. They had a diving depth of 200 ft (61.0 m).

For surface running, the "Government"-type built by Lake Torpedo Boat Company, were powered by two 700-brake-horsepower (522 kW) Busch-Sulzer 6M150 diesel engines, each driving one propeller shaft. When submerged each propeller was driven by a 600-horsepower (447 kW) Westinghouse Electric Corporation electric motor. They could reach 14 knots (26 km/h; 16 mph) on the surface and 11 kn (20 km/h; 13 mph) underwater.

The boats were armed with four 21-inch (533 mm) torpedo tubes in the bow. They carried 8 reloads, for a total of twelve torpedoes. The "Government"-type submarines were also armed with a single 4 in (100 mm)/50 caliber deck gun.

== Construction ==
S-14's keel was laid down on 7 December 1917, by the Lake Torpedo Boat Company, in Bridgeport, Connecticut. She was launched on 22 October 1919, sponsored by Mrs. Kathryn Parker, and commissioned on 11 February 1921, with future Vice Admiral, Lieutenant Commander Charles A. Lockwood, Jr., in command.

== Service history ==
=== 1921–1935 ===
Attached to SubDiv 18, S-14 sailed from New London, Connecticut, on 31 May 1921, en route, via the Panama Canal, California, Hawaii, and Guam, to Cavite, Luzon, in the Philippine Islands. She arrived at Cavite, on 1 December 1921, and commenced operations with the Asiatic Fleet.

In 1922, she sailed from Cavite, on 11 October, visited Hong Kong, from 14–28 October, and returned to Cavite, on 1 November. Sailing from Manila, on 15 May 1923, S-14 visited Shanghai, Yantai, and Qinhuangdao, before returning via Wusong and Amoy, to Cavite, on 11 September. In the summer of 1924, she again visited Chinese ports, and returned on 23 September. She finally departed Cavite, on 29 October, shifting operations to the West Coast. She reached Mare Island Navy Yard, California, on 30 December 1924.

S-14 remained at Mare Island, in 1925 and 1926, and operated along the West Coast, through 1927.

From February 1928 into 1935, S-14 served in the Panama Canal area, although she visited Baltimore, Maryland, from 15 May to 5 June 1933, and was in reserve at Coco Solo, from 1 July to 27 November 1933. Departing Coco Solo, on 25 January 1935, S-14 reported to the Philadelphia Naval Shipyard, for inactivation and was decommissioned on 22 May.

=== 1940–1945 ===
S-14 was recommissioned on 10 December 1940. Following duty along the Northeastern Coast, and a visit to the Panama Canal Zone, she operated at Saint Thomas, in the US Virgin Islands, from 31 October to 1 December 1941, and in the Panama Canal area, later that month. Next, S-14 operated at St. Thomas, from January into March 1942; in the Panama Canal area, from April 1942 into August 1943; and out of New London, from September 1943 into March 1945, with operations at Casco Bay, Maine.

== Fate ==
S-14 departed New London, on 27 April 1945, for Philadelphia, where she decommissioned on 18 May, and was struck from the Naval Vessel Register. She was sold on 16 November 1945, to North American Smelting Corporation, in Philadelphia, and scrapped.

== Awards ==
- American Defense Service Medal
- American Campaign Medal
- World War II Victory Medal

== Bibliography ==
- "Table 21 - Ships on Navy List June 30, 1919". Congressional Serial Set. U.S. Government Printing Office: 770. 1921.
- Friedman, Norman (1995). U.S. Submarines Through 1945: An Illustrated Design History. Annapolis, Maryland: Naval Institute Press. ISBN 1-55750-263-3.
- Priolo, Gary. "S-14 (SS-119)". Navsource.net.
- Hall, Anne Martin (1925). Ships of the United States navy and their sponsors, 1913-1923.
- "S-14". Dictionary of American Naval Fighting Ships. Navy Department, Naval History and Heritage Command. 1 September 2015. This article incorporates text from this source, which is in the public domain.
- Hedman, Ric; Johnston, David (22 October 2025). "S-14 through S-17". PigBoats.com.
