= 1933–34 Washington State Cougars men's basketball team =

American college basketball season

1933–34 Washington State Cougars men's basketball
- Conference: Pacific Coast Conference
- Record: 14–11 (6–10 PCC)
- Head coach: Jack Friel (6th season)
- Home arena: WSC Gymnasium

1933–34 Pacific Coast Conference men's basketball standings
	Conf.				Overall
Team	W		L	PCT	W		L	PCT
North
Washington †	14	–	2	.875	20	–	5	.800
Oregon	9	–	7	.563	17	–	8	.680
Oregon State	7	–	9	.438	14	–	10	.583
Washington State	6	–	10	.375	14	–	11	.560
Idaho	4	–	12	.250	16	–	13	.552
South
USC	9	–	3	.750	16	–	8	.667
California	8	–	4	.667	19	–	7	.731
Stanford	5	–	7	.417	8	–	12	.400
UCLA	2	–	10	.167	10	–	13	.435
† Conference playoff series winner

The 1933–34 Washington State Cougars men's basketball team represented Washington State College for the 1933–34 college basketball season. Led by sixth-year head coach Jack Friel, the Cougars were members of the Pacific Coast Conference and played their home games on campus at WSC Gymnasium in Pullman, Washington.

The Cougars were 14–11 overall in the regular season and 6–10 in conference play, fourth in the Northern division.

The National Invitation Tournament (NIT) debuted in 1938, and the NCAA tournament in 1939.
