= 1933–34 Michigan Wolverines men's basketball team =

American college basketball season

1933–34 Michigan Wolverines men's basketball
- Conference: Big Ten Conference
- Record: 6–14 (4–8 Big Ten)
- Head coach: Franklin Cappon
- Captain: Fred Petoskey
- Home arena: Yost Field House

1933–34 Big Ten Conference men's basketball standings
	Conf.				Overall
Team	W		L	PCT	W		L	PCT
Purdue	10	–	2	.833	17	–	3	.850
Wisconsin	8	–	4	.667	14	–	6	.700
Northwestern	8	–	4	.667	11	–	8	.579
Illinois	7	–	5	.583	13	–	6	.684
Iowa	6	–	6	.500	13	–	7	.650
Indiana	6	–	6	.500	13	–	7	.650
Minnesota	5	–	7	.417	9	–	11	.450
Ohio State	4	–	8	.333	8	–	12	.400
Michigan	4	–	8	.333	6	–	14	.300
Chicago	2	–	10	.167	5	–	15	.250

The 1933–34 Michigan Wolverines men's basketball team represented the University of Michigan in intercollegiate basketball during the 1933–34 season. The team compiled a 6–14 record and 4–8 against Big Ten Conference opponents. The team finished in a tie for eighth place in the Big Ten.

Franklin Cappon was in his third year as the team's head coach. Fred Petoskey was the team captain, and Alfred Plummer was the team's leading scorer with 84 points in 20 games for an average of 4.2 points per game.

== Scoring statistics ==
Player	Games	Field goals	Free throws	Points	Points per game
Alfred Plummer	20	34	16	84	4.2
Fred Petoskey	19	28	19	75	3.9
Richard Joslin	8	24	12	60	7.5
Frederick Allen	18	19	12	50	2.8
George Ford	12	20	9	49	4.1
John Jablonski	13	15	14	44	3.4
Totals	20	199	123	521	26.1
