= 1933–34 Washington Huskies men's basketball team =

American college basketball season

1933–34 Washington Huskies men's basketball

Pacific Coast Conference Champions
- Conference: Pacific Coast Conference
- Record: 20–5 (14–2 PCC)
- Head coach: Hec Edmundson (14th season)
- Captain: Hal Lee
- Home arena: UW Pavilion

1933–34 Pacific Coast Conference men's basketball standings
	Conf.				Overall
Team	W		L	PCT	W		L	PCT
North
Washington †	14	–	2	.875	20	–	5	.800
Oregon	9	–	7	.563	17	–	8	.680
Oregon State	7	–	9	.438	14	–	10	.583
Washington State	6	–	10	.375	14	–	11	.560
Idaho	4	–	12	.250	16	–	13	.552
South
USC	9	–	3	.750	16	–	8	.667
California	8	–	4	.667	19	–	7	.731
Stanford	5	–	7	.417	8	–	12	.400
UCLA	2	–	10	.167	10	–	13	.435
† Conference playoff series winner

The 1933–34 Washington Huskies men's basketball team represented the University of Washington for the 1933–34 NCAA college basketball season. Led by fourteenth-year head coach Hec Edmundson, the Huskies were members of the Pacific Coast Conference and played their home games on campus at the UW Pavilion in Seattle, Washington.

The Huskies were 18–4 overall in the regular season and 14–2 in conference play; first in the Northern division. They traveled to Los Angeles for the PCC championship series against USC, the winner of the Southern division. After dropping the first game, Washington won the next two to take the conference crown.

The National Invitation Tournament (NIT) debuted in 1938, and the NCAA tournament in 1939.

== Postseason results ==
Date time, TV	Opponent	Result	Record	Site (attendance) city, state
Pacific Coast Conference Playoff Series
Fri, March 9	at USC; Game One	L 25–27	18–5	Shrine Auditorium; Los Angeles, California
Sat, March 10	at USC; Game Two	W 43–41	19–5	Shrine Auditorium; Los Angeles, California
Mon, March 12	at USC; Game Three	W 34–30	20–5	Shrine Auditorium (5,000); Los Angeles, California
*Non-conference game. (#) Tournament seedings in parentheses. All times are in Pacific time.
