= 1933–34 Illinois Fighting Illini men's basketball team =

American college basketball season

1933–34 Illinois Fighting Illini men's basketball
- Conference: Big Ten Conference
- Record: 13–6 (7–5 Big Ten)
- Head coach: J. Craig Ruby (12th season)
- Assistant coach: Leland Stillwell (1st season)
- Captain: Hudson Hellmich
- Home arena: Huff Hall

1933–34 Big Ten Conference men's basketball standings
	Conf.				Overall
Team	W		L	PCT	W		L	PCT
Purdue	10	–	2	.833	17	–	3	.850
Wisconsin	8	–	4	.667	14	–	6	.700
Northwestern	8	–	4	.667	11	–	8	.579
Illinois	7	–	5	.583	13	–	6	.684
Iowa	6	–	6	.500	13	–	7	.650
Indiana	6	–	6	.500	13	–	7	.650
Minnesota	5	–	7	.417	9	–	11	.450
Ohio State	4	–	8	.333	8	–	12	.400
Michigan	4	–	8	.333	6	–	14	.300
Chicago	2	–	10	.167	5	–	15	.250

"1933–34 Fighting Illini men's basketball team"

The 1933–34 Illinois Fighting Illini men's basketball team represented the University of Illinois.

== Regular season ==
Craig Ruby entered the 1933–34 season as the winningest coach in the history at the University of Illinois with 96 wins. Ruby had 10 returning lettermen from a team that had finished tied for fifth place in the Big Ten the year before. For the third season in a row, the team went through a nearly perfect non-conference season, losing only 1 game, however, the Fighting Illini showed no improvement in conference play by finishing with a record of 7 wins and 5 losses. The team finished the season with an overall record of 11 wins 7 losses. The starting lineup included captain Hudson Hellmich at center, Jack Benyon and Albert Kamm at guard, with Fred Fencl and Alfred Kamm as forwards.

=== Roster ===
1933–34 Illinois Fighting Illini men's basketball team
Players
Coaches

Pos.	#	Name	Height	Weight	Year	Hometown
F	4	Hudson Hellmich (C)	—	—	Sr	Webster Groves, Missouri
F	5	Harold Benham	—	—	So	Downers Grove, Illinois
G	6	Jack Beynon	—	—	Jr	Rockford, Illinois
G	7	Lester Lindberg	—	—	So	Lockport, Illinois
F	8	Frank Froschauer	—	—	Jr	Harvey, Illinois
F	9	Karl Rohlen	—	—	Jr	Chicago, Illinois
C	10	Martin Markworth	—	—	So	Cleveland, Ohio
F	11	Coke Mills	—	—	So	Galesburg, Illinois
G	14	Elbert Gragg	—	—	Jr	Denver, Colorado
F	15	Fred Fencl	—	—	Sr	Cicero, Illinois
C	18	Alfred J. Kamm	—	—	Sr	Lakewood, Washington
G	19	Albert C. Kamm	—	—	Sr	Lakewood, Washington
F	20	Roy Guttschow	—	—	Jr	Simi Valley, California
G	22	Howard Braun	—	—	So	Champaign, Illinois
F	24	Robert Wright	—	—	So	Hinsdale, Illinois
F	25	William Gates	—	—	So	Rockford, Illinois

Head coach

- Craig Ruby (University of Missouri) (12th year)

Assistant coach(es)

- Leland Stillwell (University of Illinois) (1st year)

Legend

- (C) Team captain
- (S) Suspended
- (I) Ineligible
- (W) Walk-on
- Injured
- Current redshirt

Roster

== Schedule ==
Date time, TV	Rank^{#}	Opponent^{#}	Result	Record	Site (attendance) city, state
Non-Conference regular season
12/12/1933*		St. Louis	L 21–22	0–1	Huff Hall (4,000); Champaign, IL
12/16/1933*		Illinois Wesleyan	W 37–19	1–1	Huff Hall (4,500); Champaign, IL
12/22/1933*		at Washington (St. Louis)	W 40–36	2–1	Francis Gymnasium (3,000); St. Louis, MO
12/29/1933*		at Knox College	W 21–18	3–1	Auxiliary Gymnasium (3,000); Galesburg, IL
12/30/1933*		at Augustana	W 21–18	4–1	Old Main Gymnasium (3,000); Rock Island, IL
1/3/1934*		Missouri; Braggin' Rights	W 36–24	5–1	Huff Hall (6,000); Champaign, IL
Big Ten regular season
1/7/1934		Wisconsin	W 20–17	6–1 (1–0)	Huff Hall (4,000); Champaign, IL
1/8/1934		at Purdue	L 21–36	6–2 (1–1)	Jefferson High School (4,500); West Lafayette, IN
1/13/1934		at University of Chicago	W 32–26	7–2 (2–1)	Henry Crown Field House (3,600); Chicago, IL
1/15/1934		at Iowa; Rivalry	L 14–36	7–3 (2–2)	Iowa Field House (12,000); Iowa City, IA
1/20/1934		Northwestern; Rivalry	W 34–20	8–3 (3–2)	Huff Hall (6,000); Champaign, IL
2/6/1934*		Bradley	W 38–26	9–3	Huff Hall (6,000); Champaign, IL
2/10/1934		Indiana; Rivalry	W 28–25	10–3 (4–2)	Huff Hall (6,000); Champaign, IL
2/12/1934		University of Chicago	W 42–21	11–3 (5–2)	Huff Hall (6,000); Champaign, IL
2/17/1934		at Wisconsin	L 22–28	11–4 (5–3)	Wisconsin Field House (8,000); Madison, WI
2/19/1934		at Northwestern; Rivalry	L 25–32	11–5 (5–4)	Patten Gymnasium (4,300); Evanston, IL
2/24/1934		at Indiana; Rivalry	L 24–36	11–6 (5–5)	IU Fieldhouse (8,000); Bloomington, IN
2/26/1934		Iowa; Rivalry	W 35–31	12–6 (6–5)	Huff Hall (6,000); Champaign, IL
3/5/1934		Purdue	W 27–26	13–6 (7–5)	Huff Hall (7,000); Champaign, IL
*Non-conference game. ^{#}Rankings from AP Poll. (#) Tournament seedings in parentheses. All times are in Central Time.
