= 1933–34 Wisconsin Badgers men's basketball team =

American college basketball season

1933–34 Wisconsin Badgers men's basketball
- Conference: Big Ten Conference
- Record: 14–6 (8–4 Big Ten)
- Head coach: Walter Meanwell
- Home arena: UW Fieldhouse

1933–34 Big Ten Conference men's basketball standings
	Conf.				Overall
Team	W		L	PCT	W		L	PCT
Purdue	10	–	2	.833	17	–	3	.850
Wisconsin	8	–	4	.667	14	–	6	.700
Northwestern	8	–	4	.667	11	–	8	.579
Illinois	7	–	5	.583	13	–	6	.684
Iowa	6	–	6	.500	13	–	7	.650
Indiana	6	–	6	.500	13	–	7	.650
Minnesota	5	–	7	.417	9	–	11	.450
Ohio State	4	–	8	.333	8	–	12	.400
Michigan	4	–	8	.333	6	–	14	.300
Chicago	2	–	10	.167	5	–	15	.250

The 1933–34 Wisconsin Badgers men's basketball team represented University of Wisconsin–Madison. The head coach was Walter Meanwell, coaching his twentieth season with the Badgers. The team played their home games at the UW Fieldhouse in Madison, Wisconsin and was a member of the Big Ten Conference.

== Schedule ==
Date time, TV	Rank^{#}	Opponent^{#}	Result	Record	Site city, state
Regular Season
12/04/1933*		Ripon (WI)	W 47–18	1–0	UW Fieldhouse; Madison, Wisconsin
12/08/1933*		Carleton (MN)	W 38–18	2–0	UW Fieldhouse; Madison, Wisconsin
12/11/1933*		Carroll (WI)	W 44–17	3–0	UW Fieldhouse; Madison, Wisconsin
12/16/1933*		Marquette	W 32–30	4–0	UW Fieldhouse; Madison, Wisconsin
12/20/1933*		at Central State (WI)	W 35–10	5–0	Lincoln Fieldhouse; Wisconsin Rapids, Wisconsin
12/30/1933*		Butler	W 37–27	6–0	UW Fieldhouse; Madison, Wisconsin
1/02/1934*		at Marquette	L 26–28	6–1	Marquette Gymnasium; Milwaukee
1/06/1934		at Illinois	L 17–20	6–2 (0–1)	Huff Hall; Champaign, Illinois
1/08/1934		at Iowa	L 26–32	6–3 (0–2)	Iowa Field House; Iowa City, IA
1/13/1934		Michigan	W 34–23	7–3 (1–2)	UW Fieldhouse; Madison, Wisconsin
1/15/1934		Purdue	L 26–27	7–4 (1–3)	UW Fieldhouse; Madison, Wisconsin
2/05/1934*		Michigan State	L 25–38	7–5	UW Fieldhouse; Madison, Wisconsin
2/10/1934		at Minnesota	W 31–30	8–5 (2–3)	Williams Field House; Minneapolis
2/12/1934		Ohio State	W 42–23	9–5 (3–3)	UW Fieldhouse; Madison, Wisconsin
2/17/1934		Illinois	W 28–22	10–5 (4–3)	UW Fieldhouse; Madison, Wisconsin
2/19/1934		at Michigan	W 32–26	11–5 (5–3)	Yost Field House; Ann Arbor, Michigan
2/24/1934		at Ohio State	W 44–38	12–5 (6–3)	Ohio Expo Center Coliseum; Columbus, Ohio
2/26/1934		at Purdue	L 25–37	12–6 (6–4)	Memorial Gymnasium; West Lafayette, Indiana
3/03/1934		Iowa	W 35–32	13–6 (7–4)	UW Fieldhouse; Madison, Wisconsin
3/05/1934		Minnesota	W 34–23	14–6 (8–4)	UW Fieldhouse; Madison, Wisconsin
*Non-conference game. ^{#}Rankings from AP Poll. (#) Tournament seedings in parentheses.
