= Les Witte =

American basketball player

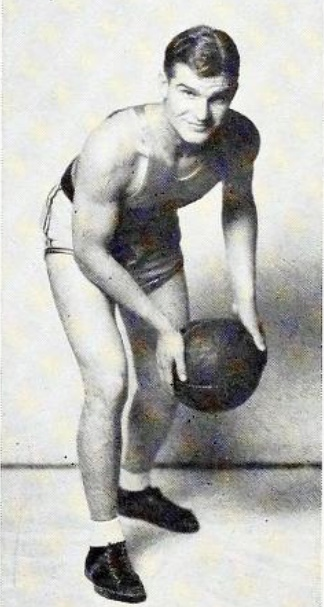
- Witte from the 1933 Wyo

Personal information
- Born: April 2, 1911 Swanton, Nebraska, U.S.
- Died: December 23, 1973 (aged 62) Denver, Colorado, U.S.
- Listed height: 6 ft 2 in (1.88 m)

Career information
- High school: Lincoln High (Lincoln, Nebraska)
- College: Wyoming (1930–1934)
- Position: Forward

Career highlights
- 2× Consensus All-American (1932, 1934)

Leslie Witte (April 2, 1911 – December 23, 1973), nicknamed "Beanie" and "One Grand Witte", was a two-time consensus All-American basketball player for the Wyoming Cowboys in 1932 and 1934. A forward, he was the first All-American in University of Wyoming history and was also the first Wyoming player to score 1,000 career points, finishing with 1,069, which was the inspiration for his "One Grand Witte" nickname.

A native of Lincoln, Nebraska, Witte played football and basketball at Lincoln High School from 1927–28 to 1929–30. In football, he helped his teammate (and future National Football League player) Bernie Masterson lead the 'Links' to a 23–0–2 record, while in basketball he also guided the team to a 40–10 record between 1929 and 1930. In his senior season of 1929–30 the basketball team won the state championship.

Les Witte was the younger brother of Cowboys head coach Willard "Dutch" Witte who coached Les for his entire career, including the national championship-winning team his senior season when Wyoming finished with a 26–4 record. In the pre-NCAA tournament days, the Helms Foundation voted to determine the national champions. Being the only college basketball voting poll of the era, Helms had the authority on issues such as All-America selections and national champions.

The Spalding Guide, an early sports magazine that focused primarily on baseball but dabbled in other sports, once wrote about Witte in a 1932 issue,

"Witte was the cleverest player to show in the conference in a long time. This boy's dribbling, pivoting and feinting, and his lefthand arch shots, could not be stopped."

Despite great college success, Witte never played professionally because there were no viable professional leagues during that time. The Basketball Association of America (BAA) would not even exist until 1946, well after Witte's prime.
