= 1933–34 Kentucky Wildcats men's basketball team =

1933–34 season of University of Kentucky men's basketball team

1933–34 Kentucky Wildcats men's basketball

SEC Regular Season & Tournament Champions
- Conference: Southeastern Conference
- Record: 16–1 (11–0 SEC)
- Head coach: Adolph Rupp (4th season)
- Home arena: Alumni Gymnasium

The 1933–34 Kentucky Wildcats men's basketball team represented the University of Kentucky in intercollegiate basketball during the 1933–34 season. The team finished the season with a 16–1 record and was retroactively listed as the top team of the season by the Premo-Porretta Power Poll.
