= 1929–30 NCAA men's basketball season =

Men's collegiate basketball season

- Helms National Champions: Pittsburgh (retroactive selection in 1943)
- Player of the Year (Helms): Chuck Hyatt, Pittsburgh (retroactive selection in 1944)

The 1929–30 NCAA men's basketball season began in December 1929, progressed through the regular season and conference tournaments, and concluded in March 1930.

== Rules changes ==
- The practice of enclosing basketball courts in chicken wire, chain-link fencing, or rope — giving basketball the nickname "the cage game" — ended. Intended to increase the tempo of play by keeping the ball from going out of bounds, to protect players and rowdy spectators from each other, and to prevent fans from throwing objects onto the court, the use of these "cages" had led to rough physical play in which players body-checked each other into the barrier, resulting in injuries. The slang term "cager" for a basketball player derives from the use of these "cages."
- The number of referees increased from one to two.

== Season headlines ==
- Pittsburgh defeated Montana State 37–36 in what was billed as a national championship game.
- In February 1943, the Helms Athletic Foundation retroactively selected Pittsburgh as its national champion for the 1929–30 season.
- In 1995, the Premo-Porretta Power Poll retroactively selected Alabama as its top-ranked team for the 1929–30 season.

== Regular season ==
=== Conferences ===
==== Conference winners and tournaments ====
Conference	Regular season winner	Conference player of the year	Conference tournament	Tournament venue (City)	Tournament winner
Big Six Conference	Missouri	None selected	No Tournament		
Big Ten Conference	Purdue	None selected	No Tournament		
Eastern Intercollegiate Basketball League	Columbia	None selected	No Tournament		
Missouri Valley Conference	Creighton & Washington University	None selected	No Tournament		
Pacific Coast Conference	Washington (North); USC (South)		No Tournament; USC defeated Washington in best-of-three conference championship playoff series		
Rocky Mountain Athletic Conference	Colorado (Eastern); Montana State & Utah State (Western)		No Tournament		
Southern Conference	Alabama	None selected	1930 Southern Conference men's basketball tournament	Municipal Auditorium (Atlanta, Georgia)	Alabama
Southwest Conference	Arkansas	None selected	No Tournament		

==== Conference standings ====
1929–30 Big Six Conference men's basketball standings
	Conf.				Overall
Team	W		L	PCT	W		L	PCT
Missouri	8	–	2	.800	15	–	3	.833
Kansas	7	–	3	.700	14	–	4	.778
Nebraska	6	–	4	.600	9	–	9	.500
Iowa State	5	–	5	.500	9	–	8	.529
Kansas State	4	–	6	.400	9	–	7	.563
Oklahoma	0	–	10	.000	6	–	12	.333

1929–30 Big Ten Conference men's basketball standings
	Conf.				Overall
Team	W		L	PCT	W		L	PCT
Purdue	10	–	0	1.000	13	–	2	.867
Wisconsin	8	–	2	.800	15	–	2	.882
Illinois	7	–	5	.583	8	–	8	.500
Indiana	7	–	5	.583	8	–	9	.471
Michigan	6	–	4	.600	9	–	5	.643
Northwestern	6	–	6	.500	8	–	8	.500
Minnesota	3	–	9	.250	8	–	9	.471
Chicago	2	–	10	.167	5	–	12	.294
Ohio State	1	–	9	.100	4	–	11	.267
Iowa	0	–	0	–	4	–	13	.235

1929–30 Eastern Intercollegiate Basketball League standings
	Conf.				Overall
Team	W		L	PCT	W		L	PCT
Columbia	9	–	1	.900	15	–	5	.750
Penn	7	–	3	.700	20	–	6	.769
Yale	4	–	6	.400	13	–	8	.619
Dartmouth	4	–	6	.400	11	–	9	.550
Princeton	3	–	7	.300	13	–	12	.520
Cornell	3	–	7	.300	6	–	12	.333

1929–30 Missouri Valley Conference men's basketball standings
	Conf.				Overall
Team	W		L	PCT	W		L	PCT
Creighton	6	–	2	.750	12	–	7	.632
Washington University	6	–	2	.750	8	–	8	.500
Drake	4	–	4	.500	10	–	9	.526
Grinnell	4	–	4	.500	6	–	9	.400
Oklahoma A&M	0	–	8	.000	1	–	15	.063

1929–30 Pacific Coast Conference men's basketball standings
	Conf.				Overall
Team	W		L	PCT	W		L	PCT
North
Washington	12	–	4	.750	21	–	7	.750
Washington State	9	–	7	.563	14	–	12	.538
Oregon	8	–	8	.500	14	–	12	.538
Oregon State	7	–	9	.438	14	–	13	.519
Idaho	4	–	12	.250	7	–	18	.280
South
USC †	7	–	2	.778	15	–	5	.750
California	6	–	3	.667	9	–	8	.529
UCLA	3	–	6	.333	14	–	8	.636
Stanford	2	–	7	.222	10	–	9	.526
† Conference playoff series winner

1929–30 Rocky Mountain Conference men's basketball standings
	Conf.				Overall
Team	W		L	PCT	W		L	PCT
Eastern
Colorado	11	–	3	.786	11	–	6	.647
Wyoming	7	–	3	.700	13	–	6	.684
Colorado College	9	–	5	.643	20	–	11	.645
Western State	6	–	6	.500	9	–	6	.600
Denver	7	–	7	.500	10	–	7	.588
Northern Colorado	7	–	7	.500	7	–	7	.500
Colorado Agricultural	4	–	10	.286	4	–	10	.286
Colorado Mines	1	–	11	.083	1	–	11	.083
Western
Utah State	7	–	5	.583	15	–	7	.682
Montana State	7	–	5	.583	21	–	10	.677
BYU	6	–	6	.500	23	–	7	.767
Utah	4	–	8	.333	15	–	12	.556

1929–30 Southern Conference men's basketball standings
	Conf.				Overall
Team	W		L	PCT	W		L	PCT
Alabama †	10	–	0	1.000	20	–	0	1.000
Duke	9	–	1	.900	18	–	2	.900
Kentucky	9	–	1	.900	16	–	3	.842
Washington and Lee	9	–	2	.818	16	–	4	.800
Tennessee	7	–	2	.778	13	–	4	.765
Georgia	7	–	3	.700	17	–	6	.739
Tulane	7	–	3	.700	16	–	7	.696
Clemson	8	–	4	.667	16	–	9	.640
Sewanee	5	–	3	.625	9	–	11	.450
Maryland	8	–	5	.615	16	–	6	.727
NC State	7	–	5	.583	11	–	6	.647
Ole Miss	6	–	6	.500	6	–	7	.462
LSU	6	–	7	.462	10	–	11	.476
Florida	2	–	3	.400	10	–	4	.714
Georgia Tech	5	–	8	.385	11	–	13	.458
North Carolina	4	–	7	.364	14	–	11	.560
VMI	2	–	6	.250	4	–	10	.286
Mississippi A&M	2	–	7	.222	5	–	8	.385
Virginia	2	–	8	.200	3	–	12	.200
Virginia Tech	2	–	10	.167	5	–	14	.263
Vanderbilt	1	–	9	.100	6	–	16	.273
Auburn	1	–	10	.091	1	–	10	.091
South Carolina	0	–	10	.000	6	–	10	.375
† Southern Conference Tournament winner

1929–30 Southwest Conference men's basketball standings
	Conf.				Overall
Team	W		L	PCT	W		L	PCT
Arkansas	10	–	2	.833	16	–	7	.696
Texas	8	–	4	.667	12	–	8	.600
SMU	6	–	6	.500	8	–	10	.444
Baylor	4	–	6	.400	10	–	6	.625
Texas A&M	4	–	6	.400	8	–	10	.444
Rice	4	–	8	.333	7	–	9	.438
TCU	4	–	8	.333	7	–	10	.412

=== Major independents ===
A total of 92 college teams played as major independents. Northwest Missouri State (31–0) was undefeated and finished with the most wins. Pittsburg State (20–0) and Western State Teachers College (17–0) also were undefeated.

1929–30 NCAA men's basketball independents standings
	Conf.				Overall
Team	W		L	PCT	W		L	PCT
Northwest Missouri State		–		–	31	–	0	1.000
Pittsburg State		–		–	20	–	0	1.000
Western State Teachers		–		–	17	–	0	1.000
St. John's (N.Y.)		–		–	23	–	1	.958
Furman		–		–	16	–	1	.941
Buffalo		–		–	15	–	1	.938
East Central		–		–	23	–	2	.920
Pittsburgh		–		–	23	–	2	.920
Syracuse		–		–	18	–	2	.900
Indiana State		–		–	16	–	2	.889
Carleton		–		–	14	–	2	.875
Westminster (Pa.)		–		–	14	–	2	.875
Marshall		–		–	13	–	2	.867
Temple		–		–	18	–	3	.857
Wooster		–		–	12	–	2	.857
Rider		–		–	17	–	3	.850
New York University		–		–	13	–	3	.813
New Mexico		–		–	16	–	4	.800
Providence		–		–	15	–	4	.789
CCNY		–		–	11	–	3	.786
West Texas State		–		–	18	–	5	.783
Cincinnati		–		–	13	–	4	.765
Wichita Municipal		–		–	14	–	4	.778
St. Bonaventure		–		–	17	–	5	.773
Bradley		–		–	13	–	4	.765
DePaul		–		–	15	–	5	.750
Michigan State		–		–	12	–	4	.750
William & Mary		–		–	16	–	6	.727
Fordham		–		–	13	–	5	.722
Loyola (Ill.)		–		–	13	–	5	.722
Arizona		–		–	15	–	6	.714
Rutgers		–		–	10	–	4	.714
Manhattan		–		–	12	–	5	.706
Notre Dame		–		–	14	–	6	.700
Saint Louis		–		–	14	–	6	.700
Santa Clara		–		–	14	–	6	.700
Harvard		–		–	9	–	4	.692
St. Ignatius		–		–	9	–	4	.692
Texas Tech		–		–	13	–	6	.684
Texas State M&M		–		–	13	–	6	.684
Rhode Island State		–		–	10	–	5	.667
Loyola (Md.)		–		–	11	–	6	.647
Villanova		–		–	11	–	6	.647
Duquesne		–		–	18	–	10	.643
Lehigh		–		–	9	–	5	.643
Davidson		–		–	12	–	7	.632
Holy Cross		–		–	12	–	7	.632
Mount Union		–		–	10	–	6	.625
Navy		–		–	10	–	6	.625
Army		–		–	9	–	6	.600
Butler		–		–	12	–	8	.600
Colgate		–		–	12	–	8	.600
Louisville		–		–	9	–	6	.600
Montana		–		–	13	–	9	.591
Seton Hall		–		–	13	–	9	.591
Springfield (Mass.)		–		–	10	–	7	.588
LIU		–		–	14	–	10	.583
Ohio		–		–	12	–	9	.571
St. Joseph's		–		–	12	–	9	.571
DePauw		–		–	9	–	7	.563
George Washington		–		–	9	–	7	.563
Connecticut		–		–	8	–	7	.533
Muhlenberg		–		–	9	–	8	.529
Northern Arizona State		–		–	9	–	8	.529
Detroit		–		–	10	–	9	.526
West Virginia		–		–	11	–	10	.524
Georgetown		–		–	13	–	12	.520
Xavier		–		–	8	–	8	.500
Marquette		–		–	11	–	12	.478
Richmond		–		–	7	–	8	.467
New Mexico A&M		–		–	12	–	14	.462
Lafayette		–		–	9	–	11	.450
Niagara		–		–	9	–	11	.450
The Citadel		–		–	9	–	11	.450
Washburn		–		–	8	–	13	.381
Brown		–		–	7	–	12	.368
Penn State		–		–	5	–	9	.357
Toledo		–		–	5	–	9	.357
Arizona State		–		–	6	–	11	.353
Boston University		–		–	4	–	8	.333
Bucknell		–		–	6	–	12	.333
Miami (Ohio)		–		–	5	–	10	.333
Saint Francis (N.Y.)		–		–	6	–	12	.333
Bowling Green State		–		–	5	–	11	.313
Kent State		–		–	4	–	9	.308
Canisius		–		–	5	–	12	.294
Valparaiso		–		–	4	–	11	.267
Saint Mary's (Calif.)		–		–	5	–	15	.250
Tulsa		–		–	2	–	6	.250
Western Kentucky State		–		–	4	–	12	.250
Dayton		–		–	4	–	14	.222
Wake Forest		–		–	2	–	11	.154

== Awards ==
=== Consensus All-American team ===
Consensus Team
Player	Class	Team
Charley Hyatt	Senior	Pittsburgh
Branch McCracken	Senior	Indiana
Stretch Murphy	Senior	Purdue
Cat Thompson	Senior	Montana State
Frank Ward	Senior	Montana State
John Wooden	Sophomore	Purdue

=== Major player of the year awards ===
- Helms Player of the Year: Chuck Hyatt, Pittsburgh (retroactive selection in 1944)

== Coaching changes ==
A number of teams changed coaches during the season and after it ended.

Team	Former Coach	Interim Coach	New Coach	Reason
Arizona State	Aaron McCreary		Ted Shipkey	McCreary left to coach at Arizona State Teachers College at Flagstaff.
Arizona State Teachers College at Flagstaff	Rudy Lavik		Aaron McCreary	
Auburn	Hal Lee		Sam J. McAllister	
The Citadel	Benny Blatt		Johnny Douglas	
Denver	Burt Potter		Stuart Clark	
Detroit	Louis Conroy		Lloyd Brazil	
George Washington	Joe Mitchell		Jim Pixlee	
Georgetown	Bill Dudack		John Colrick	Georgetown did not rehire Dudack to coach for a second season.
Kentucky	John Mauer		Adolph Rupp	Mauer left to coach Miami (Ohio).
Louisville	Tom King		Edward Weber	King stayed with Louisville to continue being the athletic director.
Loyola (Md.)	John Menton		Tony Comerford	
Marquette	Cord Lipe		Bill Chandler	
Miami (Ohio)	Roy Tillotson		John Mauer	
NC State	Gus Tebell		Ray Sermon	Tebell left to coach at Virginia.
Ole Miss	Homer Hazel		Ed Walker	
Penn	Edward McNichol		Lon Jourdet	
Saint Francis (N.Y.)	Edward Keating		George Hinchcliffe	
Seton Hall	Frank Hill		Dan Steinberg	
Stanford	Husky Hunt		John Bunn	
Texas Tech	Victor Payne		W. L. Golightly	
Tulane	Bernie Bierman		Claude Simons Sr.	
Tulsa	J. B. Miller		Oliver Hodge	
Virginia	Roy Randall		Gus Tebell	
Virginia Tech	R. S. Warren		C. D. Rhodes	
Wake Forest	Pat Miller		R. S. Hayes	
Wyoming	George McLaren		Willard White	
