= Herman Stegeman =

American sports coach, athletics administrator (1891–1939)

Biographical details
- Born: January 21, 1891; Holland, Michigan, U.S.
- Died: October 22, 1939 (aged 48); Athens, Georgia, U.S.

Playing career

Football
- 1913–1914: Chicago

Basketball
- ?–1915: Chicago

Track and field
- ?–1915: Chicago
- Position: Guard (football)

Coaching career (HC unless noted)

Football
- 1915: Beloit
- 1916–1917: Monmouth (IL)
- 1919: Georgia (assistant)
- 1920–1922: Georgia

Basketball
- 1916–1917: Monmouth (IL)
- 1919–1931: Georgia

Baseball
- 1919–1920: Georgia

Track and field
- 1920–1937: Georgia

Administrative career (AD unless noted)
- 1920–1936: Georgia

Head coaching record
- Overall: 29–17–6 (football); 178–88 (basketball); 31–13–2 (baseball)

Accomplishments and honors

Championships
- Football; 2 SIAA (1920–1921) Basketball; 1 SoCon regular season (1931)

Herman James "Stege" Stegeman (January 21, 1891 – October 22, 1939) was a coach of American football, basketball, baseball, and track and field, and a college athletics administrator. He served as the head football coach at Beloit College (1915), Monmouth College (1916–1917), and the University of Georgia (1920–1922), compiling a career college football coaching record of 29–17–6. At Georgia, Stegeman was also the head basketball coach (1919–1931), head baseball coach (1919–1920), and head track and field coach (1920–1937).

== Early years and playing career ==
Stegeman was born and raised in Holland, Michigan, and was of Dutch descent. He attended the University of Chicago, where he starred in many sports, including track and field and football under the direction of the legendary Amos Alonzo Stagg. Stegeman played on the 1913 Chicago Maroons football team, later recognized as a national champion, and was hailed by his coach, Stagg, as one of the finest athletes he had ever had coached. After playing football for another season in 1914, Stegeman graduated from Chicago with a Bachelor of Philosophy (Ph.B.) in 1915.

== Coaching career ==
During the end of World War I, the United States Army stationed Stegeman in Athens, Georgia to create physical training courses for the Reserve Officers' Training Corps (ROTC) program at the University of Georgia. After arriving, he was hired by Georgia's football coach, W. A. Cunningham, as an assistant for the 1919 Georgia Bulldogs football team. When Cunningham returned to the Army after that season, Stegeman became the head coach of the football team, serving in that position from 1920 to 1922. In addition, he also became the head coach of the basketball, baseball and track and field teams in 1920. His career football record stands at 20–6–3 (.741). He stepped down as baseball coach after one year.

After the 1922 football season, Stegeman relished is role as head coach to become the Georgia's athletic director. He remained as head coach of the basketball and track and field teams. As head coach of the Georgia basketball team from 1920 until 1931, he still owns the second-best winning percentage (.686) of any Georgia coach with more than 50 games. His final group of Bulldogs won 23 of 25 games and Stegeman was regarded by many as one of the first great basketball "gurus."

Stegeman coached Georgia's track and field team for 17 years, and was the personal coach of Forrest Towns, who won a gold medal at the 1936 Summer Olympics. Stegeman led the Georgia track team to its only Southeastern Conference (SEC) men's team conference championship, in 1937, with Towns as the star of the squad.

== Death and honors ==
Stegeman died on October 22, 1939, at his home in Athens, following a long illness.

In 1946, Stegeman Hall was named in honor of Stegeman and initially served as the home of the university's athletic and physical education departments. However, that building was demolished in the early 1990s in preparation for events hosted by the university during the 1996 Summer Olympics. As a result, Charles Boynton Knapp, the university's president at the time, led the effort to rename Georgia Coliseum as Stegeman Coliseum in Stegeman's honor on March 2, 1996.

== Head coaching record ==
=== Football ===
Year	Team	Overall	Conference	Standing	Bowl/playoffs
Beloit Gold (Independent) (1915)
1915	Beloit	0–6–1			
Beloit:		0–6–1			
Monmouth Fighting Scots (Little Five Conference) (1916–1917)
1916	Monmouth	5–2–1			
1917	Monmouth	4–3–1			
Monmouth:		9–5–2			
Georgia Bulldogs (Southern Intercollegiate Athletic Association) (1920–1921)
1920	Georgia	8–0–1	8–0–1	T–1st	
1921	Georgia	7–2–1	6–0–1	T–1st	
Georgia Bulldogs (Southern Conference) (1922)
1922	Georgia	5–4–1	1–3–1	T–16th	
Georgia:		20–6–3	15–3–3		
Total:		29–17–6			

=== Basketball ===
Record table
Season	Team	Overall	Conference	Standing	Postseason
Monmouth Fighting Scots (Independent) (1916–1917)
1916–17	Monmouth	8–10			
Monmouth:		8–10			
Georgia Bulldogs (Southern Intercollegiate Athletic Association) (1919–1921)
1919–20	Georgia	9–7	8–3		
1920–21	Georgia	13–4			
Georgia Bulldogs (Southern Conference) (1921–1931)
1921–22	Georgia	10–5	4–1	3rd	
1922–23	Georgia	11–8	3–3	T–8th	
1923–24	Georgia	16–5	7–0	T–6th	
1924–25	Georgia	9–11	4–4	T–11th	
1925–26	Georgia	18–6	9–4	5th	
1926–27	Georgia	14–8	3–6	16th	
1927–28	Georgia	12–10	8–5	8th	
1928–29	Georgia	18–6	13–4	4th	
1929–30	Georgia	17–6	7–3	T–6th	
1930–31	Georgia	23–2	15–1	1st	
Georgia:		170–78			
Total:		178–88			
National champion Postseason invitational champion Conference regular season champion Conference regular season and conference tournament champion Division regular season champion Division regular season and conference tournament champion Conference tournament champion

== Sources ==
- Reed, Thomas Walter (c. 1949). "Athletics at the University from the Beginning Through 1947". History of the University of Georgia. dlg.galileo.usg.edu. pp. 3537–3542.
- Magill, Dan (February 8, 2001). "University should honor Dooley by renaming stadium". www.onlineathens.com.
- Board of Regents (February 1996). Meeting Minutes. University System of Georgia. Archived from the original on July 20, 2008.
- Stegeman, John F.; Willingham, Robert M. Jr. Touchdown: A Pictorial History of the Georgia Bulldogs. Athens, Georgia: Agee Publishers, Inc. p. 23. Library of Congress Catalog Card Number: 83-070625.
