= 1930 College Basketball All-Southern Team =

The 1930 College Basketball All-Southern Team consisted of basketball players from the South chosen at their respective positions.

== All-Southerns ==
=== Guards ===
- Billy Werber, Duke (AP-1)
- Paul McBrayer, Kentucky (AP-1)
- Bobby Dodd, Tennessee (AP-2)
- Bill Laney, Alabama (AP-2)

=== Forwards ===
- Harry Councilor, Duke (AP-1)
- Maurice Corbitt, Tennessee (AP-1)
- Sandford Sanford, Georgia (AP-2)
- Earl Smith, Alabama (AP-2)

=== Center ===
- Lindy Hood, Alabama (AP-1)
- Joe Croson, Duke (AP-2)

== Key ==
- AP = chosen by the Associated Press.
