= 1929–30 Georgia Bulldogs basketball team =

American college basketball team season

1929–30 Georgia Bulldogs basketball
- Conference: Southern Conference
- Record: 17–6 (7–3 SoCon)
- Head coach: Herman Stegeman (11th season)
- Captain: Henry Palmer
- Home arena: Woodruff Hall

1929–30 Southern Conference men's basketball standings
	Conf.				Overall
Team	W		L	PCT	W		L	PCT
Alabama †	10	–	0	1.000	20	–	0	1.000
Duke	9	–	1	.900	18	–	2	.900
Kentucky	9	–	1	.900	16	–	3	.842
Washington and Lee	9	–	2	.818	16	–	4	.800
Tennessee	7	–	2	.778	13	–	4	.765
Georgia	7	–	3	.700	17	–	6	.739
Tulane	7	–	3	.700	16	–	7	.696
Clemson	8	–	4	.667	16	–	9	.640
Sewanee	5	–	3	.625	9	–	11	.450
Maryland	8	–	5	.615	16	–	6	.727
NC State	7	–	5	.583	11	–	6	.647
Ole Miss	6	–	6	.500	6	–	7	.462
LSU	6	–	7	.462	10	–	11	.476
Florida	2	–	3	.400	10	–	4	.714
Georgia Tech	5	–	8	.385	11	–	13	.458
North Carolina	4	–	7	.364	14	–	11	.560
VMI	2	–	6	.250	4	–	10	.286
Mississippi A&M	2	–	7	.222	5	–	8	.385
Virginia	2	–	8	.200	3	–	12	.200
Virginia Tech	2	–	10	.167	5	–	14	.263
Vanderbilt	1	–	9	.100	6	–	16	.273
Auburn	1	–	10	.091	1	–	10	.091
South Carolina	0	–	10	.000	6	–	10	.375
† Southern Conference Tournament winner

The 1929–30 Georgia Bulldogs basketball team represented the University of Georgia as a member of the Southern Conference (SoCon) during the 1929–30 NCAA men's basketball season. Led by 11th-year head coach Herman Stegeman, the Bulldogs compiled an overall record of 17–6 with a mark of 7–3 in conference play, tying for sixth place in the SoCon. The team captain was Henry Palmer.

== Roster ==
1929–30 Georgia Bulldogs men's basketball team
Players
Coaches

Pos.	#	Name	Height	Weight	Year	Previous school	Hometown
		Sandford Sanford	—	—
		Henry Palmer	—	—
		Vernon Smith	—	—
		Joe Martin	—	—
		Tommy Reeder	—	—
		Whitey Bryant	—	—

Head coach

Herman Stegeman

Assistant coach(es)

Legend

- (C) Team captain
- (S) Suspended
- (I) Ineligible
- (W) Walk-on
- Injured
- Current redshirt

== Schedule ==
Date time, TV	Opponent	Result	Record	Site city, state
12/11/1929	J.P.C. Reds	W 35-21	1–0	
12/14/1929	A.A.C.	W 42-25	2–0	
12/7/1929	New Holland			
1/1/1930	at Furman	L 22-24	3–1	
1/3/1930	Oglethorpe	W 39-27	4–1	
1/4/1930	Oglethorpe	W 44-10	5–1	
1/8/1930	at Stetson	W 40-17	6–1	
1/11/1930	at Stetson	W 27-23	7–1	
1/11/1930	at Florida	W 35-34	8–1	
1/18/1930	at Ga. Tech	W 26-23	9–1	
1/25/1930	at Ga. Tech	W 25-23	10–1	
1/29/1930	Auburn	W 43-35	11–1	
2/1/1930	Kentucky	L 21-22	11–2	
2/4/1930	N.C. State	L 24-28	11–3	
2/5/1930	at Clemson	W 39-24	12–3	
2/8/1930	A.A.C.	W 42-25	13–3	
2/14/1930	at Kentucky	L 23-36	13–4	
2/16/1930	at A.A.C.	L 38-51	13–5	
2/18/1930	Clemson	W 36-32	14–5	
2/19/1930	Mercer	W 41-27	15–5	
2/22/1930	at Ga. Tech	W 35-31	16–5	
2/28/1930	N. Carolina	W 26-17	17–5	
3/1/1930	Alabama	L 26-29	17–6	
*Non-conference game. (#) Tournament seedings in parentheses.
