= Hank Crisp =

American college coach and athletics administrator

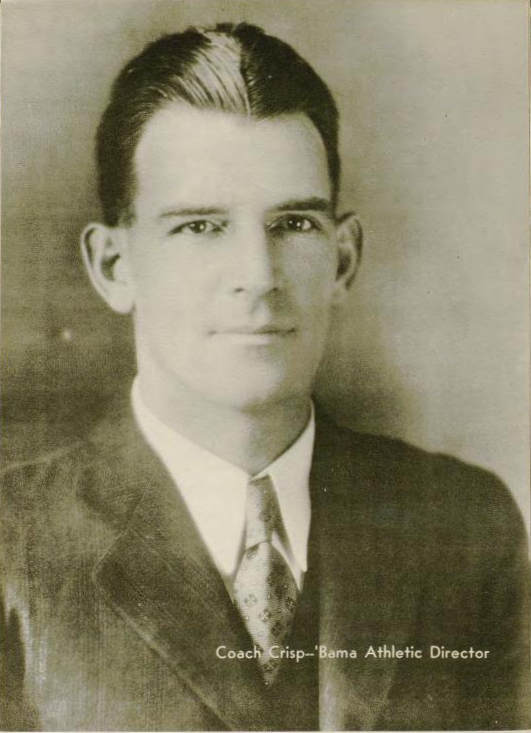
- Crisp, c. 1938

Biographical details
- Born: December 10, 1896; Crisp, North Carolina, U.S.
- Died: January 23, 1970 (aged 73); Birmingham, Alabama, U.S.

Playing career

Football
- 1915–1916: Hampden–Sydney
- 1917–1920: VPI
- Positions: Tackle, running back

Coaching career (HC unless noted)

Football
- 1921–1941: Alabama (line)
- 1945: Alabama (line)
- 1946: Miami Seahawks (assistant/HC)
- 1947–1949: Tulane (line)
- 1950–1957: Alabama (line)

Basketball
- 1924–1942: Alabama
- 1945–1946: Alabama

Baseball
- 1928: Alabama

Track
- 1921–1927: Alabama

Administrative career (AD unless noted)
- 1930–1940: Alabama
- 1954–1957: Alabama

Head coaching record
- Overall: 264–133 (basketball); 12–7–2 (baseball)

Accomplishments and honors

Championships
- Basketball; SoCon regular season (1930); SEC tournament (1934); 2 SEC regular season (1939, 1940)

Henry Gorham Crisp (December 10, 1896 – January 23, 1970) was an American football, basketball, baseball and track coach and college athletics administrator. In spite of an accident when he was 13 years old that resulted in the loss of his right hand, Crisp went on to letter in football, basketball and track at both Hampden–Sydney College and Virginia Tech – then known primarily as VPI.

After completing his collegiate career, Crisp began his long coaching career at the University of Alabama. There he served as the head basketball coach (1924–1942, 1945–1946), baseball coach (1928), track coach (1921–1927), as a line coach with the football team (1921–1941, 1945, 1950–1957) and as athletic director (1930–1940, 1954–1957). Crisp also served as an assistant and interim head coach with the Miami Seahawks (1946) and as a line coach at Tulane (1947–1949).

== Early life ==
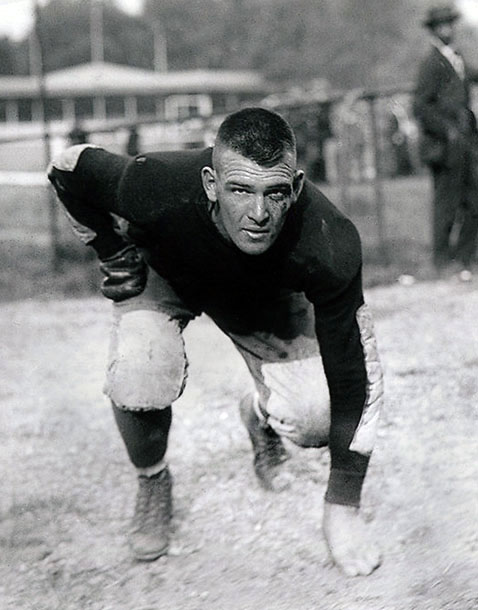
Crisp at VPI

Henry "Hank" Gorham Crisp was born on December 10, 1896, at Crisp, North Carolina. At the age of five, Crisp moved with his family to Falkland, North Carolina where his father operated a retail store. At the age of 13, he lost his right hand as a result of an accident that occurred as he helped his father fill a silo. After he graduated from Blackstone Military Academy in 1914, Crisp enrolled at Hampden–Sydney College where he played under Charles A. Bernier on the Tigers' football team. After his first game against VMI, one of the Keydets' coaches, impressed by Crisp's performance, told coach Bernier, "Why don't you cut one hand off all your players?"

After two years at Hampden–Sydney, Crisp transferred to VPI (now Virginia Polytechnic Institute and State University or Virginia Tech) after the 1916 season and followed coach Bernier who took the position as the Gobblers head coach. While at VPI, Crisp lettered four years in football, three in basketball, one in track and also played as a pitcher on the baseball team.

As a member of the Gobblers football team, he was the team captain (MVP) for the South Atlantic Intercollegiate Athletic Association (SAIAA) champion 1918 VPI squad. The season was considered the best in VPI's history at the time. They did not win seven straight games again until 1967. Crisp was the quarterback on the 1919 team. In recognition of his accomplishments as an athlete at VPI, in 1987 Crisp was inducted into the Virginia Tech Sports Hall of Fame.

== Coaching career ==
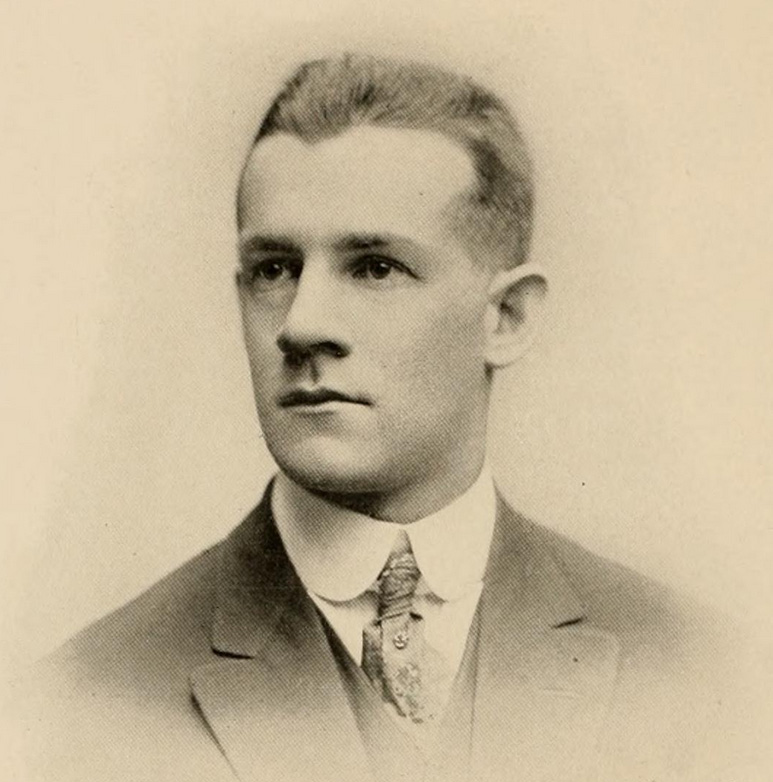
Charles A. Bernier

=== Football ===
==== Alabama ====
Crisp was hired by his former head coach Charles A. Bernier, who had resigned from VPI to become the head basketball coach and athletic director at Alabama, in February 1921. His first position on the Crimson Tide football staff was as line coach under Xen C. Scott for the 1921 team. The next season, he was the head coach of the freshman team, and in 1923 he was retained by new head coach Wallace Wade as the line coach once again through the end of his tenure at Alabama in 1930. During the Wade era, Crisp was an assistant coach for the 1925, 1926 and 1930 squads that each captured a share of the national championship.

After Wade's resignation, Crisp was again retained on the football staff. Working under Frank Thomas, Crisp continued in his role of line coach, and again won a share of the national championship after the 1934 season. Under Thomas, Crisp's role outside of his duties as the line coach was that of the team disciplinarian to complement the soft-spoken, diplomatic style of Thomas. He continued in his role as line coach through the end of the 1941 season when he took a leave of absence to serve as a civilian physical training instructor for the U.S. Navy pre-flight school at the University of Georgia. He then returned to Alabama and again served as line coach for the 1945 season, before he left to take an assistant coaching position with the Miami Seahawks.

==== Miami Seahawks ====
On June 29, 1946, the owner of the All-America Football Conference's (AAFC) Miami Seahawks Harvey Hester announced Crisp had been hired as the last member of the inaugural Seahawks staff. Hired as the line coach, Crisp served under head coach Jack Meagher and alongside assistants Hamp Pool and Ralph Jordan for the 1946 season. After the squad opened the season with only one win and six losses (1–6) Meagher resigned as head coach of the Seahawks on October 22. At the time of his resignation, Harvey Hester announced both Crisp and Pool were to serve as co-head coaches for the remainder of the season.

==== Tulane ====
On February 22, 1947, Crisp was hired to serve as line coach at Tulane under head coach Henry Frnka. At the time of the announcement, Crisp indicated he would maintain his permanent residence and family service station in Tuscaloosa and report to New Orleans for spring practices and the regular season in the fall. He remained at Tulane through the end of the 1949 season, and on December 27, 1949, officially returned to Alabama as line coach.

==== Return to Alabama ====
On December 27, 1949, university officials announced the return of Crisp to the Alabama coaching staff for the 1950 season under head coach Harold Drew. In 1953, the Alabama Alumni Association recognized Crisp's 25 years of service with a halftime ceremony in their October game against Tulsa. At that ceremony, he was presented with an automobile and government bonds from the Association and was able to reflect on his career with the 18,000 fans in attendance that day. Crisp was again retained as line coach after the resignation of Drew and the hiring of Jennings B. Whitworth in December 1954. As a result of only winning four games during Whitworth's three-year tenure, Crisp resigned his position and retired as a coach after Bear Bryant was hired as the new Alabama head coach. At the request of Bryant, Crisp stayed on staff and oversaw recruiting as Bryant did not officially take over as head coach until after Texas A&M's loss in the Gator Bowl.

=== Basketball ===
Crisp served as the Alabama men's basketball coach from 1924 through 1942 and again from 1945 to 1946. During his tenure, Crisp compiled an overall record of 264 wins and 133 losses (264–133), and won the SoCon Championship in 1930, the SEC tournament championship in 1934 and the SEC Regular Season Championship in 1939 and 1940.

During his first stint with the Crimson Tide, Crisp led Alabama to runner-up of national champion North Carolina in the SoCon tournament in 1924. The team was led by All-Southern center Slim Carter. Crisp led Alabama to their only undefeated season in 1930 en route to a 20–0 record, the SoCon Championship, and retroactive recognition as the top team of the season by the Premo-Porretta Power Poll. The squad also included Alabama's first All-American, center Lindy Hood.

==== Head coaching record ====
Record table
Season	Coach	Overall	Conference	Standing	Postseason
Alabama Crimson Tide (Southern Conference) (1923–1932)
1923–24	Alabama	12–4	5–1	4th	
1924–25	Alabama	15–4	5–2	5th	
1925–26	Alabama	10–11	6–6	11th	
1926–27	Alabama	5–8	4–5	12th	
1927–28	Alabama	10–10	5–5	T–9th	
1928–29	Alabama	16–10	10–6	8th	
1929–30	Alabama	20–0	10–0	1st	
1930–31	Alabama	14–6	11–2	3rd	
1931–32	Alabama	16–4	11–3	4th	
Alabama Crimson Tide (Southeastern Conference) (1933–1942)
1932–33	Alabama	14–5	12–3	2nd	
1933–34	Alabama	16–2	13–2	2nd	
1934–35	Alabama	9–8	8–7	5th	
1935–36	Alabama	15–9	9–6	6th	
1936–37	Alabama	11–10	7–8	9th	
1937–38	Alabama	4–13	4–12	12th	
1938–39	Alabama	16–5	13–4	1st	
1939–40	Alabama	18–5	14–4	1st	
1940–41	Alabama	14–8	11–7	4th	
1941–42	Alabama	18–6	13–4	2nd	
Alabama Crimson Tide (Southeastern Conference) (1945–1946)
1945–46	Alabama	11–5	8–4	4th	
Alabama:		264–133			
Total:		264–133			
National champion Postseason invitational champion Conference regular season champion Conference regular season and conference tournament champion Division regular season champion Division regular season and conference tournament champion Conference tournament champion

=== Baseball ===
After the arrival of Jimmy R. Haygood as the new coach of the track team in the spring of 1928, Crisp became Alabama's head baseball coach. During his only season as head coach, he only lost one series (against Georgia) and completed the season with a record of twelve wins, seven losses and two ties (12–7–2, 12–5 in the SoCon).

==== Head coaching record ====
Record table
Season	Coach	Overall	Conference	Standing	Postseason
Alabama Crimson Tide (Southern Conference) (1928)
1928	Alabama	12–7–2	12–5		
Alabama:		12–7–2	12–5		
Total:		12–7–2	12–5		

== Athletic director ==
On April 10, 1930, Chairman of the Athletic Committee J. J. Doster announced that Crisp was to become Alabama's athletic director. Effective September 1, 1930, his appointment to the position was made as a replacement for the departing Wallace Wade. By 1932, his efforts as athletic director to expand athletic programs to all students at the university was recognized by Amateur Sports magazine. He remained in the position of athletic director through March 1940 when he was granted a leave of absence to regain his health due to a severe sinus issue. Frank Thomas was appointed as athletic director and retained the position upon the reinstatement Crisp from his leave in August 1940.

Crisp was later appointed as interim athletic director at Alabama in March 1954 after the resignation of Pete Cawthon. He held the title of interim athletic director through February 1955 when University President Oliver Carmichael announced his full-time appointment to the position. During his second tenure, Crisp hired Jennings B. Whitworth as football coach in 1954 and Eugene Lambert as basketball coach in 1956. In 1957, he resigned his post and hired Bear Bryant as his replacement as athletic director at Alabama.

== Later life ==
After his retirement as coach and athletic director in 1957, Crisp remained active at the university and served as director of intramural athletics through 1967. In 1970, he was inducted into the Alabama Sports Hall of Fame in recognition for his contributions to sport in the state. However, on the eve of his induction, Crisp died at University Hospital in Birmingham as a result of a heart attack he suffered at the Hall of Fame banquet on January 23, 1970. The Hank Crisp Indoor Facility on the University of Alabama campus, which was completed in October 1986, was renamed in honor of Crisp in April 1991.
