= 1930 Southern Conference men's basketball tournament =

- Classification: Division I
- Teams: 16
- Site: Municipal Auditorium; Atlanta, GA
- Champions: Alabama (1st title)
- Winning coach: Hank Crisp (1st title)
- Top scorer: Joe Croson (Duke) (38 points)

1929–30 Southern Conference men's basketball standings
	Conf.				Overall
Team	W		L	PCT	W		L	PCT
Alabama †	10	–	0	1.000	20	–	0	1.000
Duke	9	–	1	.900	18	–	2	.900
Kentucky	9	–	1	.900	16	–	3	.842
Washington and Lee	9	–	2	.818	16	–	4	.800
Tennessee	7	–	2	.778	13	–	4	.765
Georgia	7	–	3	.700	17	–	6	.739
Tulane	7	–	3	.700	16	–	7	.696
Clemson	8	–	4	.667	16	–	9	.640
Sewanee	5	–	3	.625	9	–	11	.450
Maryland	8	–	5	.615	16	–	6	.727
NC State	7	–	5	.583	11	–	6	.647
Ole Miss	6	–	6	.500	6	–	7	.462
LSU	6	–	7	.462	10	–	11	.476
Florida	2	–	3	.400	10	–	4	.714
Georgia Tech	5	–	8	.385	11	–	13	.458
North Carolina	4	–	7	.364	14	–	11	.560
VMI	2	–	6	.250	4	–	10	.286
Mississippi A&M	2	–	7	.222	5	–	8	.385
Virginia	2	–	8	.200	3	–	12	.200
Virginia Tech	2	–	10	.167	5	–	14	.263
Vanderbilt	1	–	9	.100	6	–	16	.273
Auburn	1	–	10	.091	1	–	10	.091
South Carolina	0	–	10	.000	6	–	10	.375
† Southern Conference Tournament winner

The 1930 Southern Conference men's basketball tournament took place from February 28–March 4, 1930, at Municipal Auditorium in Atlanta, Georgia. The Alabama Crimson Tide won their first Southern Conference title, led by head coach Hank Crisp.

== Bracket ==
First round February 27
Alabama	31
Clemson	22
Georgia	26
North Carolina	17
Tennessee	28
VMI	20
Washington & Lee	33
Ole Miss	29
Duke	43
LSU	34
Georgia Tech	53
Tulane	31
Kentucky	26
Maryland	21
Sewanee	25
NC State	19

Quarterfinals; March 1
Alabama	29
Georgia	26
Tennessee	38
Washington & Lee	29
Duke	44
Georgia Tech	35
Kentucky	44
Sewanee	22

Semifinals; March 3
Alabama	32
Tennessee	22
Duke	37
Kentucky	32

Finals; March 4
Alabama	31
Duke	24

* Overtime game

=== Championship ===
March 4

Alabama 31, Duke 24
Pts: Walter Laney & Fred Wambsgans 7	Pts: Billy Werber 10

Municipal Auditorium, Atlanta, Georgia
Referees: Sutton

== All-Southern tournament team ==
Player	Position	Class	Team
Billy Werber	G	Senior	Duke
Paul McBrayer	G	Senior	Kentucky
Harry Councilor	F	Junior	Duke
Maurice Corbitt	F	Junior	Tennessee
Lindy Hood	C	Junior	Alabama

== See also ==
- List of Southern Conference men's basketball champions
