= 1929–30 Indiana Hoosiers men's basketball team =

American college basketball season

1929–30 Indiana Hoosiers men's basketball
- Conference: Big Ten Conference
- Record: 8–9 (7–5 Big Ten)
- Head coach: Everett Dean (6th season)
- Captain: Branch McCracken
- Home arena: The Fieldhouse

1929–30 Big Ten Conference men's basketball standings
	Conf.				Overall
Team	W		L	PCT	W		L	PCT
Purdue	10	–	0	1.000	13	–	2	.867
Wisconsin	8	–	2	.800	15	–	2	.882
Illinois	7	–	5	.583	8	–	8	.500
Indiana	7	–	5	.583	8	–	9	.471
Michigan	6	–	4	.600	9	–	5	.643
Northwestern	6	–	6	.500	8	–	8	.500
Minnesota	3	–	9	.250	8	–	9	.471
Chicago	2	–	10	.167	5	–	12	.294
Ohio State	1	–	9	.100	4	–	11	.267
Iowa	0	–	0	–	4	–	13	.235

The 1929–30 Indiana Hoosiers men's basketball team represented Indiana University. Their head coach was Everett Dean, who was in his 6th year. The team played its home games in The Fieldhouse in Bloomington, Indiana, and was a member of the Big Ten Conference.

The Hoosiers finished the regular season with an overall record of 8–9 and a conference record of 7–5, finishing 4th in the Big Ten Conference.

== Roster ==
No.	Name	Position	Ht.	Year	Hometown
2	Lucian Ashby	F	5–11	Jr.	Evansville, Indiana
3	Paul Jasper	C	6–2	Jr.	Fort Wayne, Indiana
6	James Strickland	F	6–2	Sr.	Owensville, Indiana
7	Branch McCracken	C	6–5	Sr.	Monrovia, Indiana
8	Claron Veller	G	5–9	Jr.	Linton, Indiana
10	Donald Cooper	F	6–1	Sr.	North Vernon, Indiana
11	Bernard Miller	F	6–1	Jr.	Waldron, Indiana
12	Victor Dauer	F	5–11	So.	Gary, Indiana
13	James Gill	G	6–2	Sr.	Washington, Indiana
17	Leonard Miller	F	6–1	Sr.	Waldron, Indiana
18	Carl Eber	G	N/A	N/A	Plymouth, Indiana
19	Jacob Bretz	F	6–1	Jr.	Huntingburg, Indiana
21	Maurice Massy	G	6–1	N/A	Indianapolis, Indiana
22	Joseph Zeller	G	6–1	So.	East Chicago, Indiana
N/A	Bill Blagrave	G	6–2	So.	Washington, Indiana

== Schedule/results ==
Date time, TV	Rank^{#}	Opponent^{#}	Result	Record	Site city, state
Regular season
12/7/1929*		DePauw	L 24–26	0–1	The Fieldhouse; Bloomington, Indiana
12/13/1929*		Pittsburgh	L 31–35	0–2	The Fieldhouse; Bloomington, Indiana
12/21/1929*		at Pennsylvania	L 21–26	0–3	The Palestra; Philadelphia
1/7/1930*		Notre Dame	L 29–30	0–4	The Fieldhouse; Bloomington, Indiana
1/11/1930		at Chicago	W 36–24	1–4 (1–0)	Bartlett Gymnasium; Chicago
1/18/1930		Northwestern	W 36–22	2–4 (2–0)	The Fieldhouse; Bloomington, Indiana
1/20/1930		at Michigan	L 26–45	2–5 (2–1)	Yost Field House; Ann Arbor, Michigan
1/23/1930		Wisconsin	L 21–23	2–6 (2–2)	The Fieldhouse; Bloomington, Indiana
2/3/1930*		at Washington (Mo.)	W 33–21	3–6 (2–2)	Field House; St. Louis, Missouri
2/8/1930		at Ohio State	W 26–22	4–6 (3–2)	Ohio Expo Coliseum; Columbus, Ohio
2/12/1930		at Northwestern	W 39–31	5–6 (4–2)	Old Patten Gymnasium; Evanston, Illinois
2/15/1930		Chicago	W 28–16	6–6 (5–2)	The Fieldhouse; Bloomington, Indiana
2/22/1930		Michigan	L 18–21	6–7 (5–3)	The Fieldhouse; Bloomington, Indiana
3/1/1930		Ohio State	W 27–15	7–7 (6–3)	The Fieldhouse; Bloomington, Indiana
3/3/1930		Minnesota	W 31–25	8–7 (7–3)	The Fieldhouse; Bloomington, Indiana
3/8/1930		at Wisconsin	L 23–34	8–8 (7–4)	Red Gym; Madison, Wisconsin
3/10/1930		at Minnesota	L 29–34	8–9 (7–5)	Minnesota Field House; Minneapolis
*Non-conference game. ^{#}Rankings from AP Poll. (#) Tournament seedings in parentheses.
