= Stegeman Coliseum =

Arena in Athens, Georgia, United States

- The Steg
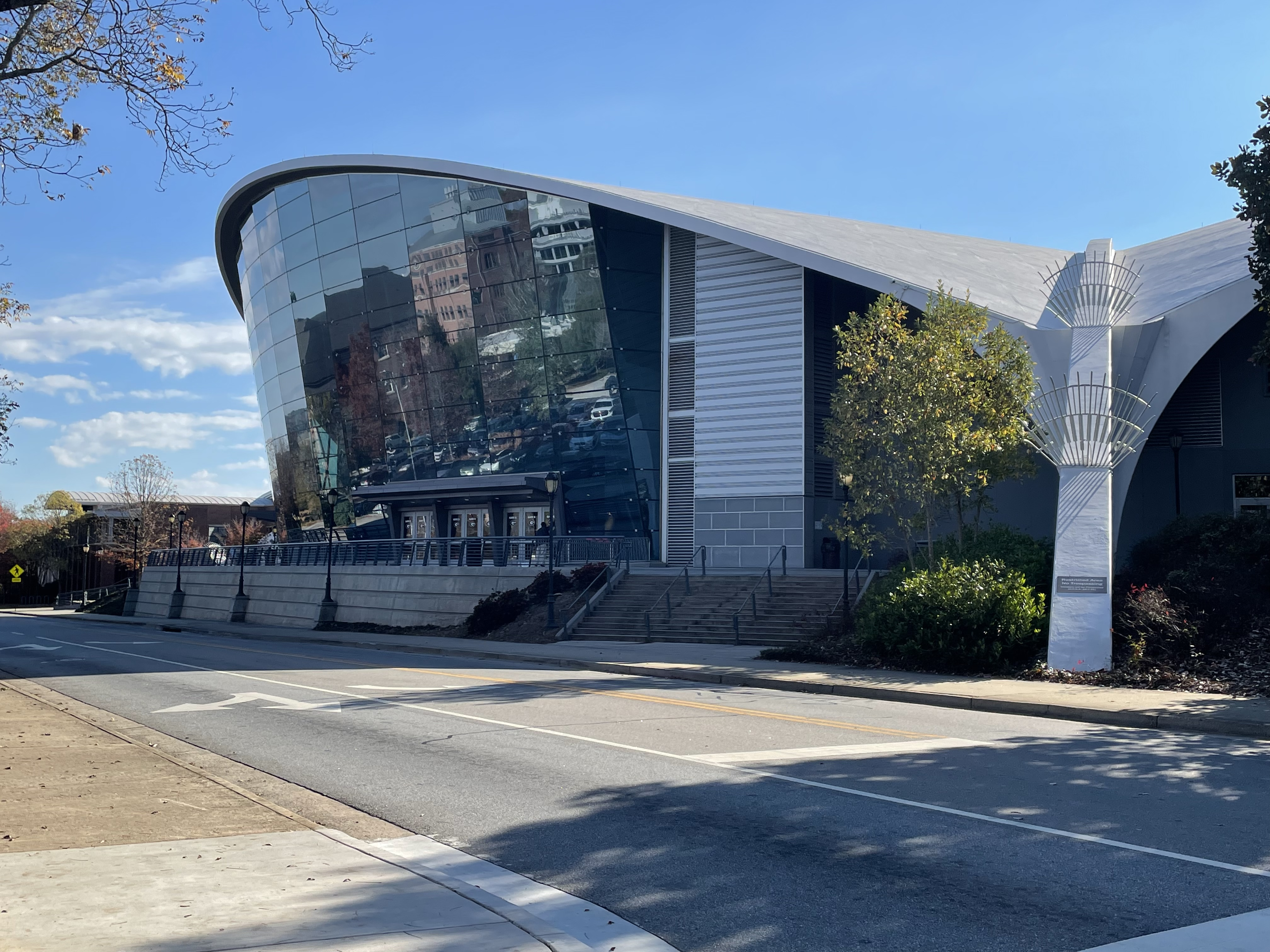
- Stegeman Coliseum in 2023
- Interactive map of Stegeman Coliseum
- Former names: Georgia Coliseum (1964–1996)
- Location: 100 Smith Street; Athens, GA 30605
- Coordinates: 33.9428°N 83.3780°W
- Owner: University of Georgia
- Operator: University of Georgia
- Capacity: 10,523 (1994–present); 10,400 (1988–1994); 11,200 (1964–1988)
- Surface: Hardwood

Construction
- Groundbreaking: January 1962
- Opened: February 22, 1964; 62 years ago
- Cost: $4.2 million ($43.6 million in 2025 dollars)
- Architects: Cooper, Barrett, Skinner, Woodbury & Cooper
- Structural engineers: Chastain & Tindel
- General contractors: Thompson & Street

Tenants
- Georgia Bulldogs (men's and women's basketball, volleyball, gymnastics)

Stegeman Coliseum, formerly known as Georgia Coliseum, is a 10,523-seat multi-purpose arena in Athens, Georgia, United States. The arena opened in 1964, and named in honor of Herman Stegeman. It is home to the University of Georgia Bulldogs basketball, volleyball, and gymnastics teams. It was also the venue of the rhythmic gymnastics and preliminary indoor volleyball matches during the 1996 Summer Olympics, as well as the 1989, 1995, and 2008 NCAA gymnastics championships. As a multi-purpose facility, the Coliseum also hosted a variety of other kinds of events, including many large indoor rock concerts during its early history, as well as the university's Graduate School commencement exercises. At its opening it replaced Woodruff Hall, a 3,000-seat field house built in 1923.

== Design ==
The ceiling is barrel-shaped, with the Sanford Drive side being curved as well. The resulting inside seating is in a "U" shape, with the flat end, which includes the scoreboard, not having the upper levels of seating. The Sanford Drive side was decorated with the Olympic insignia and other markings for the 1996 Summer Olympics. The roof is a separate structure from the coliseum itself, connected by an aluminum bellows which allows the roof to rise and fall with the temperature. The roof has four outward supports in an arc style.

The former Georgia Coliseum received its current name on March 2, 1996, in honor of Herman Stegeman, a longtime basketball coach at UGA who was a pioneer in the development of the original Southern Conference basketball tournament in 1921.

== Renovations ==
The university has undertaken several renovations. Originally, Stegeman Coliseum had a stage at one end. Today, a scoreboard, a new section for student seating and banners commemorating the accomplishments of the teams that call Stegeman Coliseum home occupy that space. In anticipation of the 1996 Olympic Games, Stegeman Coliseum received new scoreboard systems, including the first video replay board in an SEC basketball venue. In 2000, all of the old, wooden seats in the lower level were removed, the concrete was resealed, and new cushioned seats were installed. More recently, new LED "ribbon" boards have been installed around the upper ring of the Coliseum (not a 360-degree ribbon but three segments of ribbon on each of the non-video-board sides). The building has also undergone several cosmetic changes to the exterior in the past few years. Currently, the university has preliminary plans to undertake a drastic overhaul of the building, including dropping the event level down several feet to increase capacity. In October 2006, an adjoining practice facility for men's and women's basketball and gymnastics was finished.

The Coliseum underwent a $13 million expansion and renovation after the 2009–10 season. The main concourse level of approximately 30,000 square feet (2,800 m^{2}) was fully renovated, including modernization and addition of restrooms, upgrades to concession area, a new merchandising area, a first aid room, a new ticket sales area, and new graphics and way finding signage. Also included were 10,000 square feet (930 m^{2}) of expanded lobby space (including both sides) and 30,000 square feet (2,800 m^{2}) of renovated concourse, restrooms, and concessions. Renovations began on May 12, 2010, and were functionally complete in time for the 2010–11 basketball season. The expansion was officially dedicated on January 18, 2011.

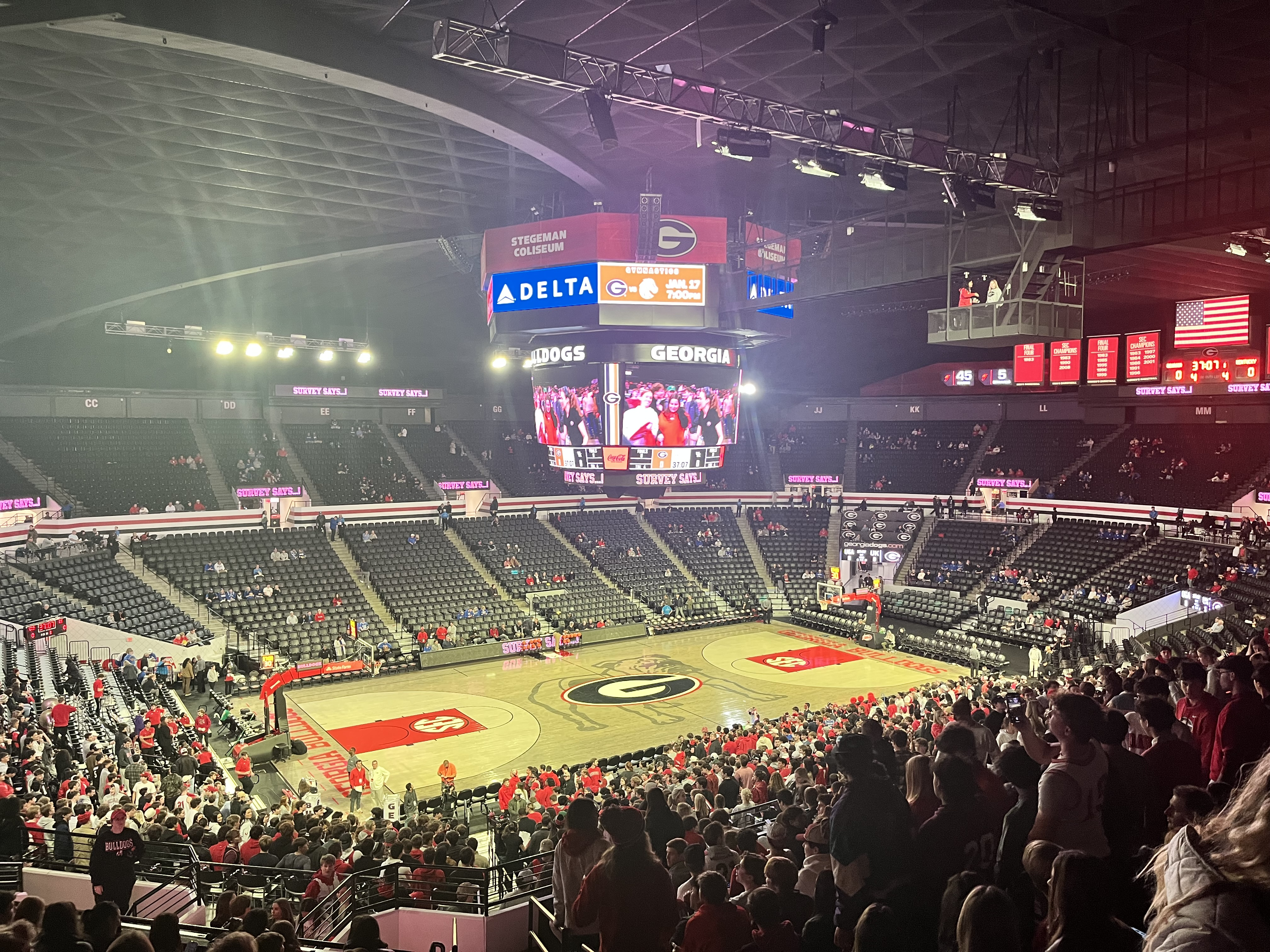
Stegeman Coliseum during the 2024–25 Georgia Bulldogs basketball season.

== Notable events ==
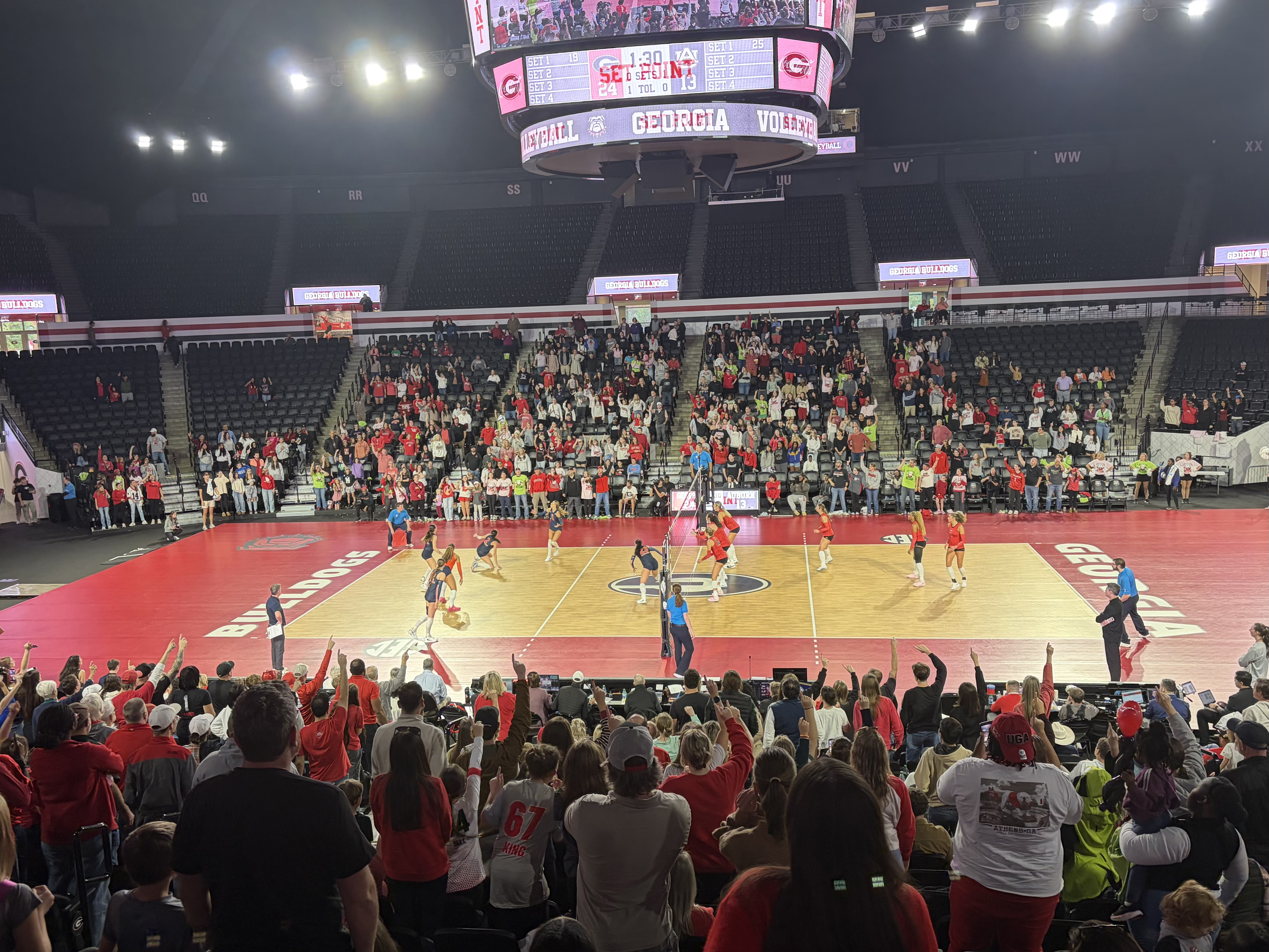
Stegeman Coliseum configured for volleyball

Georgia upset arch-rival Georgia Tech in the Coliseum's first game on February 22, 1964, 81–68, under the leadership of head coach Harbin "Red" Lawson. The inaugural game set an attendance record of 13,200 that has never been surpassed. The original design afforded the Coliseum 11,200 seats, but in the excitement of the opening of "The Jewel of North Georgia", officials let anyone come inside that showed up. This would be the first and the last time that this was done.

The Coliseum also hosted the Mideast Regional of the 1971 NCAA men's basketball tournament. The Western Kentucky Hilltoppers won the regional with an 81–78 win in overtime over the Ohio State Buckeyes. At the close of the 2014-2015 season, Georgia's men's basketball teams had amassed a home record of 484 wins and 221 losses (.686).

On April 13–16, the arena hosted the inaugural FIRST Robotics Competition Peachtree District State Championship. 41 teams from the state of Georgia attended the championship, with Global Dynamics, East Cobb Robotics and Walton Robotics winning the event. In addition, Kell Robotics won the District Championship Chairman's Award, one of the most prestigious awards in the FIRST Robotics Competition. They, along with 8 other teams, qualified for the FIRST Championship.

Jake Scott, a member of the 1968 Georgia Bulldogs football team once rode a motorcycle over the arches of the stadium. Later renovations added special railings to make sure the event didn't occur again.

== See also ==
- List of NCAA Division I basketball arenas
