= Alabama Crimson Tide men's basketball =

Men's college basketball team

2026–27 Alabama Crimson Tide men's basketball team
- University: University of Alabama
- First season: 1912–13; 114 years ago
- Athletic director: Greg Byrne
- Head coach: Nate Oats; 8th season, 170–73 (.700)
- Location: Tuscaloosa, Alabama
- Arena: Coleman Coliseum (capacity: 15,383)
- NCAA division: Division I
- Conference: SEC
- Nickname: Crimson Tide
- Colors: Crimson and white
- Student section: Crimson Chaos
- All-time record: 1,850–1,118–1 (.623)
- NCAA tournament record: 32–26 (.552)

NCAA Division I tournament Final Four
- 2024
Other NCAA Division I tournament results
Elite Eight	2004 2024 2025
Sweet Sixteen	1976 1982 1985 1986 1987 1990 1991 2004 2021 2023 2024 2025 2026
Appearances	1975 1976 1982 1983 1984 1985 1986 1987 1989 1990 1991 1992 1994 1995 2002 2003 2004 2005 2006 2012 2018 2021 2022 2023 2024 2025 2026

Conference tournament champions
- SoCon: 1930 SEC: 1934, 1982, 1987, 1989, 1990, 1991, 2021, 2023

Conference regular-season champions
- SoCon: 1930 SEC: 1939, 1940, 1956, 1974, 1975, 1976, 1987, 2002, 2021, 2023

Conference division champions
- SEC West: 2002, 2005, 2011

Uniforms
Home	Away
- * vacated by NCAA

The Alabama Crimson Tide men's basketball team represents the University of Alabama in NCAA Division I men's basketball. The program plays in the Southeastern Conference (SEC). Among SEC teams it trails only long-time basketball powerhouse Kentucky in SEC tournament titles, is third behind Kentucky and Tennessee in SEC regular season conference titles, and is fourth behind Kentucky, Texas, and Arkansas in total wins. Alabama was retroactively ranked as the best pre-NCAA tournament team for the 1929–30 season by the Premo-Porretta Power Poll; however, this poll is not officially recognized by the NCAA. The team has appeared in the NCAA tournament 26 times, most recently in 2025, and has made twelve Sweet Sixteens, three Elite Eights, and one Final Four in the tournament. Alabama's current head coach is Nate Oats.

The men's basketball program has spent most of its history in the shadow of Alabama's football team, but has risen in stature over the past several decades. The program was notable as a regular conference basketball contender in the 1980s and early 1990s under the direction of coach Wimp Sanderson and in the 1970s under coach C. M. Newton. Under former coach Mark Gottfried, the team achieved a No. 1 national ranking briefly in 2003. In the 2003–04 season, the team defeated #1-seeded Stanford in the NCAA tournament, and reached the Elite Eight round for the first time where they lost to the eventual national champion, Connecticut.

Under Nate Oats, the team earned SEC titles in 2021 and 2023. In the latter year, the Crimson Tide achieved their best-ever season in program history to that point, earning the No. 1 overall seed in the NCAA tournament. They fell to the eventual runner-up, San Diego State, in the Sweet Sixteen. In the 2024 NCAA tournament, they defeated #1-seeded North Carolina in the Sweet Sixteen, and defeated #6-seeded Clemson in the Elite Eight to advance to their first Final Four appearance in the school's history where they lost to the eventual national champion, UConn.

== History ==
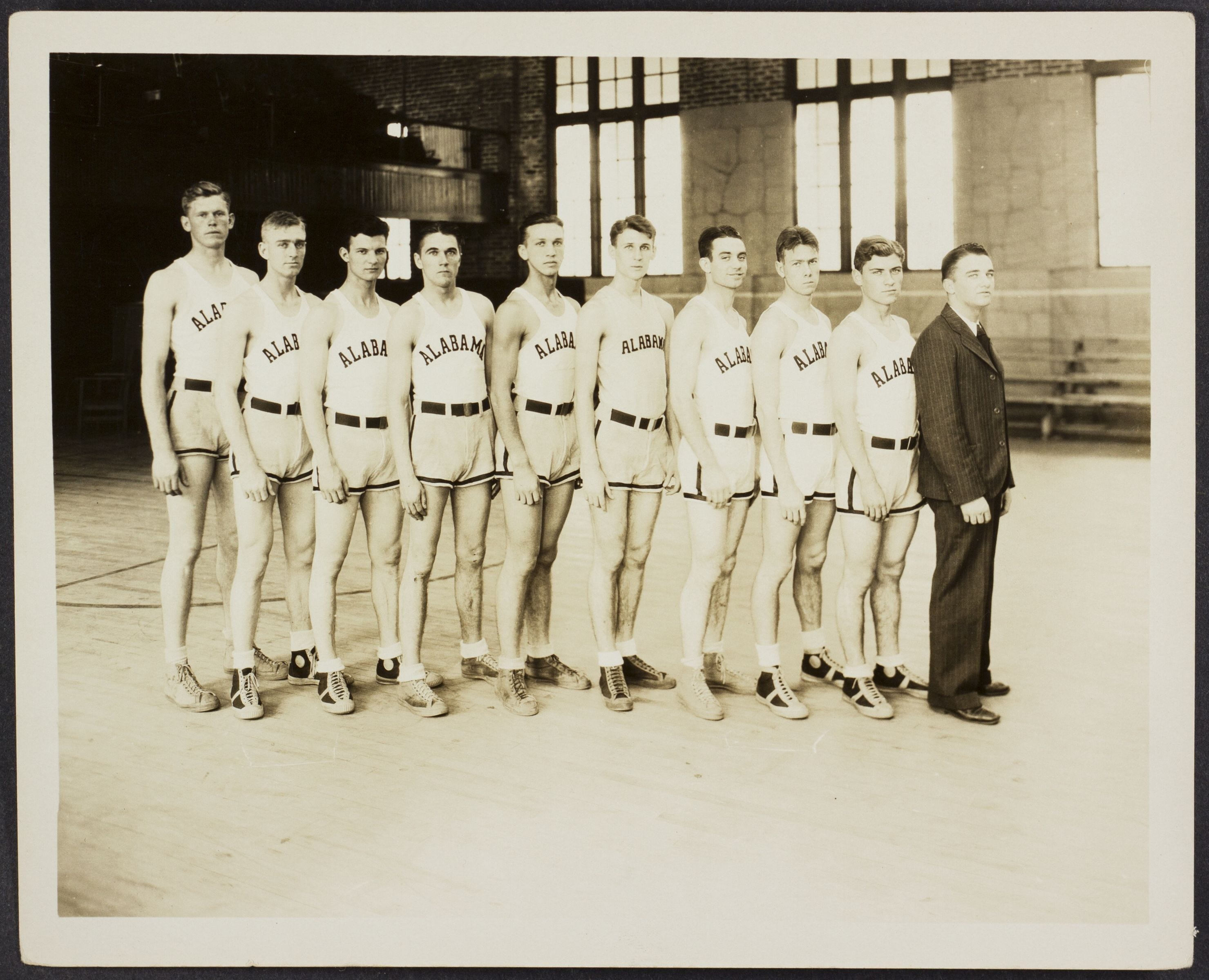
1929–30 Alabama Crimson Tide men's basketball team

Former coaches with at least five years with the Crimson Tide include the following: Hank Crisp (1923–1942, 1945–1946), Hayden Riley (1960–1968), C. M. Newton (1968–1980), Wimp Sanderson (1980–1992) – Alabama's winningest coach (.692), David Hobbs (1992–1998), Mark Gottfried (1998–2009), and Anthony Grant (2009–2015).

Other coaches include John Dee, D.V. Graves, Floyd Burdette, and Charles A. Bernier.

=== C. M. Newton ===
C.M. Newton (1968–1980)
Season	Overall record	SEC record	Postseason
1968–69	4–20	1–17	None
1969–70	8–18	5–13	None
1970–71	10–16	6–12	None
1971–72	18–8	13–5	None
1972–73	22–8	13–5	NIT 4th Place
1973–74	22–4	15–3	None
1974–75	22–5	15–3	NCAA 1st Round
1975–76	23–5	15–3	NCAA 2nd Round
1976–77	25–6	14–4	NIT 4th Place
1977–78	17–10	11–7	None
1978–79	22–11	11–7	NIT 3rd Place
1979–80	18–12	12–6	NIT 2nd Round
Overall record: 211–123 (.632)

In 1968, legendary Alabama football coach Paul "Bear" Bryant, who was also Alabama's athletic director, called Kentucky men's basketball coach Adolph Rupp looking for someone to turn around Alabama's basketball program. Rupp recommended C. M. Newton, a former backup player at Kentucky who had been at Transylvania University for 12 years. In 12 seasons at Alabama, Newton led the Tide to a record of 211–123. The Crimson Tide won three straight SEC titles under Newton (1974, 1975, and 1976), the only program besides Kentucky to accomplish this feat. Newton also guided Alabama to four NIT and two NCAA Men's Division I Championship tournament berths, prompting the school to name a recruiting suite in his honor in 2006.

Just as he did at Transylvania, Newton recruited Alabama's first black player, Wendell Hudson, in 1969, integrating his second team in as many coaching stops.

=== Wimp Sanderson ===
Wimp Sanderson (1980–1992)
Season	Overall record	SEC record	Postseason
1980–81	18–11	10–8	NIT 2nd Round
1981–82	24–7	12–6	NCAA Sweet 16
1982–83	20–12	8–10	NCAA 1st Round
1983–84	18–12	10–8	NCAA 1st Round
1984–85	23–10	11–7	NCAA Sweet 16
1985–86	24–9	13–5	NCAA Sweet 16
1986–87	28–5	16–2	NCAA Sweet 16
1987–88	14–17	6–12	None
1988–89	23–8	12–6	NCAA 1st Round
1989–90	26–9	12–6	NCAA Sweet 16
1990–91	23–10	12–6	NCAA Sweet 16
1991–92	26–9	10–6	NCAA 2nd Round
Overall record: 267–119 (.692)

Newton resigned as head coach after the 1980–81 season to become assistant commissioner of the SEC. He was succeeded by his top assistant, Wimp Sanderson. He had been at Alabama since 1960 as a graduate assistant to Newton's predecessor, Hayden Riley; he was named a full-fledged assistant in 1961. In 12 years as head coach his teams averaged 21.8 wins a year, with a 267–119 record, and they won 4 SEC tournaments. They played in one NIT and eight NCAA tournaments making the "Sweet 16" five times. Sanderson is the only coach in Alabama history to win 200 or more games in his first 10 years. He was the SEC Coach of the Year in 1987, 1989 and 1990, and was the National Coach of the Year in 1987.

Sanderson was best known for wearing garish plaid sports jackets on the sidelines. At one point, Coleman Coliseum was known as the "Plaid Palace", and the mid-court logo was painted in a crimson-and-white plaid pattern.

=== David Hobbs ===
Hobbs was hired at Alabama as an assistant coach for Wimp Sanderson in 1985 and spent seven years as an assistant in Tuscaloosa helping the Crimson Tide win one SEC Championship and four SEC Tournament crowns while the Tide made four appearances in the NCAA tournament's Sweet 16. As an assistant, he had the opportunity to coach such All-SEC performers as Robert Horry, James "Hollywood" Robinson and Latrell Sprewell.

When Sanderson left Alabama following the 1992 season, Hobbs was named head coach. In his first season, the Tide finished 16–13 and advanced to the NIT. In 1994 and 1995, Alabama recorded 20-win seasons and advanced to the NCAA tournament behind the play of future NBA All-Star Antonio McDyess. In 1996, Hobbs led UA to a 19–13 mark and a berth in the NIT Final Four. He resigned his post following the 1998 season after compiling a 110–76 (.594) career record and producing nine All-SEC players.

=== Mark Gottfried ===
Mark Gottfried (1998–2009)
Season	Overall record	SEC record	Postseason
1998–99	17–15	7–11	NIT 1st Round
1999–2000	13–16	6–10	None
2000–01	25–11	8–8	NIT Championship Game
2001–02	27–8	12–4	NCAA 2nd round
2002–03	17–12	7–9	NCAA 1st Round
2003–04	20–13	8–8	NCAA Elite Eight
2004–05	24–8	12–4	NCAA 1st Round
2005–06	18–13	10–6	NCAA 2nd round
2006–07	20–12	7–9	NIT 1st Round
2007–08	17–16	5–11	Declined invitation to CBI
2008–09	12–7	2–3	Resigned mid-season.
Overall record: 210–130 (.618)

Mark Gottfried served as the Crimson Tide's head coach from the 1998–99 season until midway through the 2008–09 season. Gottfried played 3 seasons of basketball at Alabama under Wimp Sanderson, and the Crimson Tide advanced to the Sweet Sixteen in each of those seasons. He was hired by Alabama in March 1998 after coaching at Murray State for three seasons.

The Crimson Tide achieved the highest pinnacle ever for the school in both the NCAA Championship tournament and the Associated Press Poll reaching the Elite Eight in the tournament in 2004 and reaching the No. 1 spot in the nation in the AP poll in 2002, both under Mark Gottfried's command.

Gottfried led the Tide to its only SEC Championship under his watch during the 2001–02 season, although the team never won a conference tournament championship during his tenure. For his efforts in 2002, Gottfried was named SEC Coach of the Year by both the Associated Press and his fellow Southeastern Conference coaches. Perhaps his biggest accomplishment as coach at Alabama was leading the Crimson Tide to five consecutive NCAA tournaments from 2002 to 2006, another first for the school that occurred under his watch.

Gottfried resigned on January 26, 2009, with 11 regular season games still remaining on the team's schedule. Then Athletic Director Mal Moore named long-time Alabama assistant and former player, Philip Pearson as interim head coach for the remainder of the 2008–09 season.

=== Anthony Grant ===
On March 27, 2009 Anthony Grant agreed in principle to become the 20th Crimson Tide head men's basketball coach. Grant came to Alabama after serving as the head coach at VCU from 2006 to 2009.

After a mediocre first season, Grant led the veteran 2010–11 team to a SEC West title and a 2nd-place finish in the 2011 NIT. The 2011–12 team endured the suspensions of several star players to finish with a 21–12 record and a berth in the 2012 NCAA Division I men's basketball tournament, where they lost in the round of 64 to Creighton. This was the Crimson Tide's first trip to the NCAA tournament since 2006. In March 2015, Grant was fired by Alabama after six seasons. Assistant coach John Brannen served as interim head coach for the 2015 NIT tournament.

=== Avery Johnson ===
On April 5, 2015, Avery Johnson agreed to become Alabama's next head coach. The former NBA coach said he was attracted to the position because he perceived it as "a big challenge" in that Alabama is not a "perennial favorite" and has never won a championship before. Johnson's 2017–18 team finished with a 20–16 (8–10) record and was invited to the NCAA tournament. The next season, the Tide finished 18–16 (8–10) and Johnson was let go at the end of the campaign.

=== Nate Oats ===
On March 27, 2019, Nate Oats was named Alabama's next head coach. Oats was previously the coach for the Buffalo Bulls, and had led them to three NCAA tournament appearances in the past four years. After a 16–15 record in his first season in 2019–20, Oats' second season brought Alabama the first SEC regular-season title since 2002 and the first SEC tournament title since 1991. The Tide were a No. 2 seed in the 2021 tournament, where they fell to UCLA in overtime in the Sweet Sixteen. Then in 2023, Oats coached Alabama to their second SEC regular season and tournament championship in three years. Alabama returned as the No. 1 overall seed in the 2023 NCAA tournament where they advanced to the Sweet Sixteen for the second time under Oats tenure before falling to San Diego State who advanced to the National Championship game.

In 2024, Alabama once again made the NCAA tournament and advanced to their second Elite Eight in program history after defeating North Carolina in the Sweet Sixteen. Bama beat Clemson in the West Region finals to advance to the Final Four for the first time in program history. By the end of the 2024–25 season, Oats had led Alabama to two Sweet Sixteen finishes, one Elite Eight finish, and one Final Four, the most sustained runs of tournament success by the school.

Oats also holds the best record against AP top 10 teams in Alabama history.

== Roster ==
2025–26 Alabama Crimson Tide men's basketball team
Players
Coaches

Pos.	#	Name	Height	Weight	Year	Previous school	Hometown
G	0	Labaron Philon Jr.	6 ft 4 in (1.93 m)	177 lb (80 kg)	So	Link Academy (MO)	Mobile, AL
G	1	Jalil Bethea	6 ft 5 in (1.96 m)	—	So	Miami (FL)	Philadelphia, PA
G	2	Aden Holloway	6 ft 1 in (1.85 m)	180 lb (82 kg)	Jr	Auburn	Charlotte, NC
G	3	Latrell Wrightsell Jr.	6 ft 3 in (1.91 m)	190 lb (86 kg)	GS	Cal State Fullerton	Omaha, NE
G	4	Davion Hannah	6 ft 6 in (1.98 m)	—	Fr	Link Academy (MO)	Milwaukee, WI
F	5	Amari Allen	6 ft 8 in (2.03 m)	—	Fr	Ashwaubenon HS	Green Bay, WI
F	6	London Jemison	6 ft 8 in (2.03 m)	—	Fr	St. Thomas More	Bloomfield, CT
F	7	Taylor Bol Bowen	6 ft 10 in (2.08 m)	—	Jr	Florida State	Jericho, VT
F	10	Keitenn Bristow	6 ft 10 in (2.08 m)	—	So	Tarleton State	Holliday, TX
G	11	Preston Murphy Jr.	6 ft 1 in (1.85 m)	—	Jr	Northern Oklahoma College	Barrington, RI
C	15	Noah Williamson	7 ft 0 in (2.13 m)	249 lb (113 kg)	Sr	Bucknell	Riga, Latvia
F	22	Aiden Sherrell	6 ft 10 in (2.08 m)	240 lb (109 kg)	So	Prolific Prep	Detroit, MI
C	34	Collins Onyejiaka	6 ft 11 in (2.11 m)	—	Fr	The Newman School	Boston, MA
G	95	Houston Mallette	6 ft 5 in (1.96 m)	200 lb (91 kg)	GS	Pepperdine	Alameda, CA

Head coach

- Nate Oats (Maranatha Baptist)

Assistant coach(es)

- Preston Murphy (Rhode Island)
- Brian Adams (Connecticut College)
- Chris Fleming (Richmond)

Legend

- (C) Team captain
- (S) Suspended
- (I) Ineligible
- (W) Walk-on
- Injured
- Current redshirt

Roster

== Arena ==
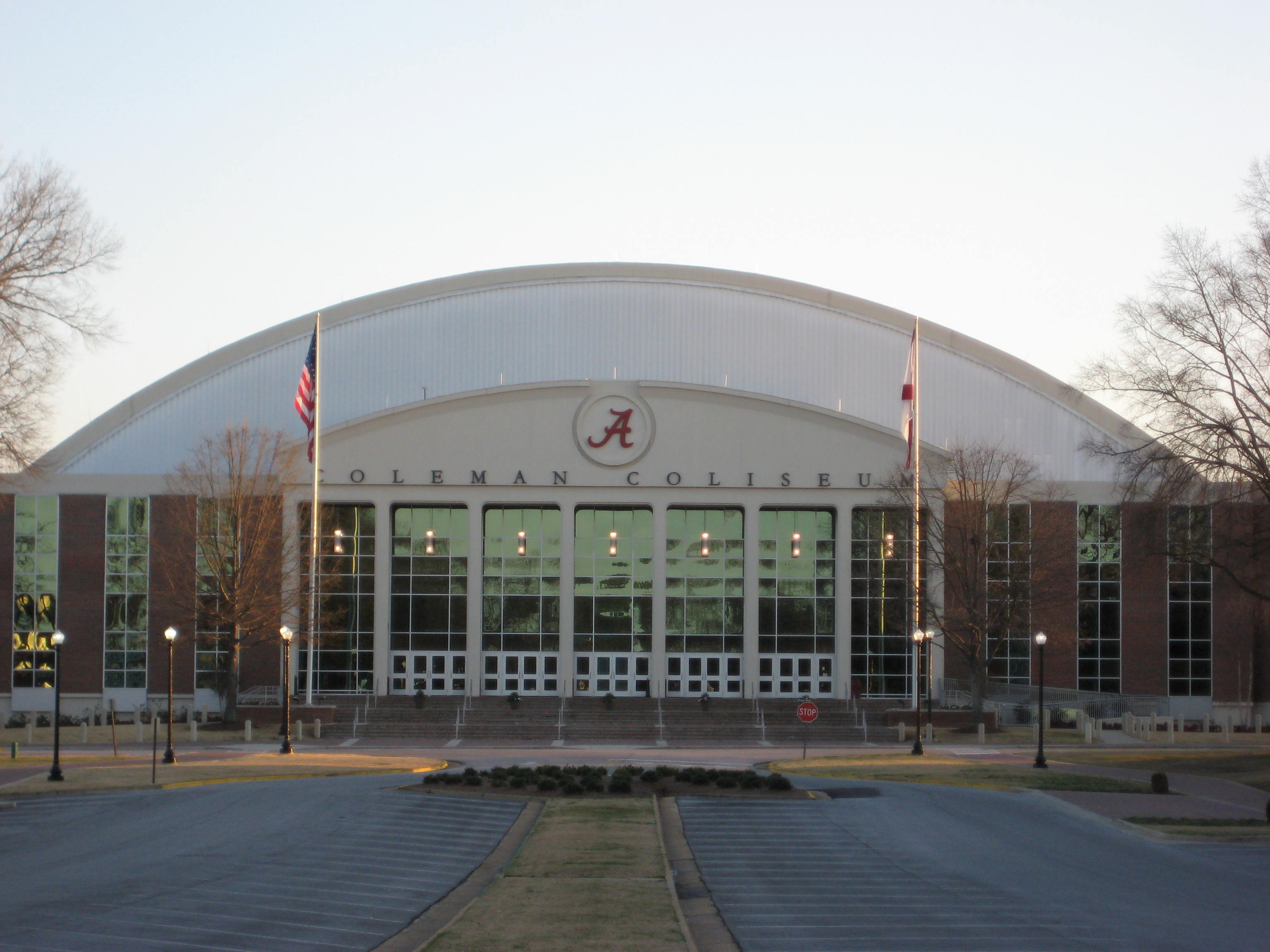
Front view of Coleman Coliseum

The Crimson Tide basketball team practices and plays in Coleman Coliseum, a multi-purpose arena on the UA campus in Tuscaloosa. The arena was built for $4.2 million and opened in 1968 as a replacement for the aging Foster Auditorium. In 2005, the building underwent a renovation in which more seats were added. The arena officially seats 15,314 people.

Coleman Coliseum was named for Jefferson Jackson Coleman, a prominent alumnus and longtime supporter of the University of Alabama. Until his death in 1995, he was the only person that had attended every Alabama football bowl game, starting with the Rose Bowl Game on January 1, 1926. Prior to 1990, the building was known as Memorial Coliseum.

== Fan support ==
=== Mark's Madness ===
"Mark's Madness" was a student organization named after former Crimson Tide coach Mark Gottfried, which is also a play on the nickname for the NCAA basketball tournament, "March Madness". It was created by a group of Alabama students in January 2000 in an attempt to create a more exciting atmosphere in Coleman Coliseum. During the Gottfried era, the Crimson Tide was an impressive 137-27 (.835) in Coleman Coliseum. Mark's Madness was the largest student organization on campus during its time. The end of Mark Gottfried's tenure in early 2009 also meant the end of the Mark's Madness name.

=== Crimson Chaos ===
After Coach Anthony Grant was hired, a group of senior students approached the UA Marketing Department in the summer 2009 about resurrecting the student section organization. During the first exhibition game of the 2009 season, it was announced that the new name of the student organization for supporting Alabama basketball would be "Crimson Chaos".

As Crimson Chaos entered its second year, it officially registered as a University of Alabama student group and adopted a new format. In addition to supporting men's basketball, Crimson Chaos expanded to support all University of Alabama sports, becoming the official student group of athletics at the university. The group also tried new things to make the atmosphere in Coleman Coliseum as intimidating as it was in previous years, including adding the "Roll Tide Roller Coaster". The newly energized environment Crimson Chaos created in Coleman Coliseum helped the Tide complete an undefeated season at home (for the 2010–11 season) with a 19–0 record, including wins over then #12 Kentucky, Georgia, Mississippi State.

Luke “Fluff” Ratliff was a well-known advocate of the club who worked as its president and who wore a checkered coat while attending games. Ratliff played an important role among the student fans by encouraging interactions between the basketball team under head coach Nate Oats and other campus sports teams. After his death, a plaque was placed in his honor on the chair in the arena that is designated for future presidents of Crimson Chaos.

== Post-season results ==
=== NCAA tournament ===
The Crimson Tide have appeared in the NCAA tournament 27 times. They have reached the Sweet Sixteen twelve times, (Note: Alabama's records for the 1987 tournament were vacated by the NCAA.) the Elite Eight three times, and the Final Four once. The Crimson Tide have an overall NCAA tournament record of 33–26.

Year	Seed	Round	Opponent	Result
1975		First Round	Arizona State	L 94–97
1976		First Round; Sweet Sixteen	North Carolina; Indiana	W 79–64; L 69–74
1982	#4	Second Round; Sweet Sixteen	#5 St. John's #1 North Carolina	W 69–68; L 69–74
1983	#6	First Round	#11 Lamar	L 50–73
1984	#9	First Round	#8 Illinois State	L 48–49
1985	#7	First Round; Second Round; Sweet Sixteen	#10 Arizona #2 VCU #3 NC State	W 50–41; W 63–59; L 55–61
1986	#5	First Round; Second Round; Sweet Sixteen	#12 Xavier #4 Illinois #1 Kentucky	W 97–80; W 58–56; L 63–68
1987*	#2	First Round; Second Round; Sweet Sixteen	#15 North Carolina A&T #7 New Orleans #6 Providence	W 88–71; W 101–76; L 82–103
1989	#6	First Round	#11 South Alabama	L 84–86
1990	#7	First Round; Second Round; Sweet Sixteen	#10 Colorado State #2 Arizona #11 Loyola Marymount	W 71–54; W 77–55; L 60–62
1991	#4	First Round; Second Round; Sweet Sixteen	#13 Murray State #5 Wake Forest #1 Arkansas	W 89–79; W 96–88; L 70–93
1992	#5	First Round; Second Round	#12 Stanford #4 North Carolina	W 80–75; L 55–64
1994	#9	First Round; Second Round	#8 Providence #1 Purdue	W 76–70; L 73–83
1995	#5	First Round; Second Round	#12 Penn #4 Oklahoma State	W 91–85^{OT} L 52–66
2002	#2	First Round; Second Round	#15 Florida Atlantic #10 Kent State	W 86–78; L 58–71
2003	#10	First Round	#7 Indiana	L 62–67
2004	#8	First Round; Second Round; Sweet Sixteen; Elite Eight	#9 Southern Illinois #1 Stanford #5 Syracuse #2 Connecticut	W 65–64; W 70–67; W 80–71; L 71–87
2005	#5	First Round	#12 Milwaukee	L 73–83
2006	#10	First Round; Second Round	#7 Marquette #2 UCLA	W 90–85; L 59–62
2012	#9	Second Round (Note: The Round of 64 was named the second round with the play-in games named the first round then.)	#8 Creighton	L 57–58
2018	#9	First Round; Second Round	#8 Virginia Tech #1 Villanova	W 86–83; L 58–81
2021	#2	First Round; Second Round; Sweet Sixteen	#15 Iona #10 Maryland #11 UCLA	W 68–55; W 96–77; L 78–88^{OT}
2022	#6	First Round	#11 Notre Dame	L 64–78
2023	#1	First Round; Second Round; Sweet Sixteen	#16 Texas A&M–Corpus Christi #8 Maryland #5 San Diego State	W 96–75; W 73–51; L 64–71
2024	#4	First Round; Second Round; Sweet Sixteen; Elite Eight; Final Four	#13 Charleston #12 Grand Canyon #1 North Carolina #6 Clemson #1 Connecticut	W 109–96; W 72–61; W 89–87; W 89–82; L 72–86
2025	#2	First Round; Second Round; Sweet Sixteen; Elite Eight	#15 Robert Morris #7 Saint Mary's #6 BYU #1 Duke	W 90–81; W 80–66; W 113–88; L 65–85
2026	#4	First Round; Second Round; Sweet Sixteen	#13 Hofstra #5 Texas Tech #1 Michigan	W 90–70; W 90–65; L 77–90

=== NIT appearances ===
Alabama has appeared in 16 National Invitation Tournaments, reaching the championship game on two occasions. Alabama has an overall NIT record of 24–19.

Year	Seed	Round	Opponent	Result
1973	-	First round Quarterfinals; Semifinals; Third-place game	Manhattan; Minnesota; Virginia Tech; North Carolina	W 87–86; W 69–65; L 73–74; L 69–88
1977	-	First round Quarterfinals; Semifinals; Third-place game	Memphis State; Virginia Tech; Houston; Villanova	W 86–63; W 79–72; L 76–82; L 89–102
1979	-	First round Second round Quarterfinals; Semifinals; Third-place game	St. Bonaventure; Virginia; Texas A&M; Purdue; Ohio State	W 98–89; W 90–88; W 72–68; L 68–87; W 96–86
1980	-	First round Second round	Penn State; Murray State	W 53–49; L 62–70
1981	-	First round Second round	St. John's; Duke	W 73–69; L 70–75
1993	-	First round	UAB	L 56–58
1996	-	First round Second round Quarterfinals; Semifinals; Third-place game	Illinois; Missouri; South Carolina; St. Joseph's; Tulane	W 72–69; W 72–49; W 68–67; L 69–74; L 76–87
1999	-	First round	Wake Forest	L 57–73
2001	-	First round Second round Quarterfinals; Semifinals; Championship Game	Seton Hall; Toledo; Purdue; Detroit-Mercy; Tulsa	W 85–79; W 79–69; W 85–77; W 74–63; L 66–79
2007	#5	First round	#4 Massachusetts	L 87–89
2011	#1	First round Second round Quarterfinals; Semifinals; Championship Game	#8 Coastal Carolina #4 New Mexico #2 Miami (FL) #1 Colorado #4 Wichita State	W 68–44; W 74–67; W 79–64; W 62–61; L 57–66
2013	#1	First round Second round Quarterfinals	#8 Northeastern #4 Stanford #2 Maryland	W 62–43; W 66–54; L 57–58
2015	#6	First round Second round	#3 Illinois #2 Miami (FL)	W 79–58; L 66–73
2016	#5	First round	#4 Creighton	L 54–72
2017	#3	First round	#6 Richmond	L 64–71
2019	#1	First round	#8 Norfolk State	L 79–80^{OT}

== Former players ==
The Alabama Crimson Tide men's basketball program has produced former players who have collectively won nine NBA Championships, earned six All-Star selections, six All-Defensive Team honors and three All-Rookie honors, while earning over $390 million in the NBA. Additionally, alumni of the program have appeared in nearly 10,000 combined NBA games and scored more than 90,000 total points.

=== Tide alumni currently in the NBA ===
Player	Years at UA	NBA Team
Collin Sexton	2017–2018	Los Angeles Lakers
Herbert Jones	2017–2021	New Orleans Pelicans
Keon Ellis	2020–2022	Brooklyn Nets
JD Davison	2021–2022	Houston Rockets
Brandon Miller	2022–2023	Charlotte Hornets
Noah Clowney	2022–2023	Brooklyn Nets
Mark Sears	2022–2025	Milwaukee Bucks
Grant Nelson	2023-2025	Brooklyn Nets
Chris Youngblood	2024–2025	Portland Trail Blazers
Labaron Philon Jr.	2024–2026	Philadelphia 76ers

Source: Basketball Reference

=== Tide alumni in international leagues ===
- Aaron Estrada (born 2001), basketball player for Karditsa of the Greek Basketball League
- Donta Hall (born 1997), basketball player for Maccabi Tel Aviv of Israeli Basketball Premier League
- Tony Mitchell (born 1989), basketball player for Beirut Club of the Lebanese Basketball League
- Retin Obasohan (born 1993), basketball player for Bàsquet Manresa of the Liga ACB
- Clifford Omoruyi (born 2001), basketball player for Maccabi Tel Aviv B.C. of the Israeli Basketball Premier League
- Levi Randolph (born 1992), basketball player for Hapoel Tel Aviv of the Israeli Basketball Premier League
- Jimmie Taylor (born 1995), basketball player for APOEL B.C. of the Cyprus Basketball Division A
- Dominick Welch (born 1998), basketball player for Team FOG Naestved of the Danish Basketligaen

=== All-Americans ===
- Lindy Hood; 1930
- Jim Homer; 1947
- Jerry Harper; 1955 & 1956
- George Linn; 1956
- Jack Kubiszyn; 1958
- Bob Andrews; 1965
- Wendell Hudson; 1973
- Leon Douglas; 1973, 1975 & 1976
- Charles Cleveland; 1975
- T. R. Dunn; 1974 & 1977
- Reggie King; 1976, 1978 & 1979
- Eddie Phillips; 1980 & 1982
- Ennis Whatley; 1983
- Derrick McKey; 1987
- James Robinson; 1991 & 1993
- Erwin Dudley; 2002
- Mo Williams; 2002
- Kennedy Winston; 2005
- Ronald Steele; 2006
- Richard Hendrix; 2008
- Alonzo Gee; 2009
- Collin Sexton; 2018
- Herbert Jones; 2021
- Brandon Miller; 2023
- Mark Sears; 2024 & 2025
- Labaron Philon Jr.; 2026

== All-time record vs. current SEC teams ==
Opponent	Won	Lost	Percentage	Streak	First Meeting
Arkansas	35	36	.493	Won 5	1948
Auburn	103	69	.599	Won 1	1924
Florida	79	74	.516	Lost 4	1927
Georgia	101	53	.656	Won 3	1922
Kentucky	44	117	.273	Won 3	1923
LSU	118	75	.611	Won 5	1916
Mississippi State	137	76	.643	Won 8	1913
Ole Miss	127	59	.683	Lost 1	1921
Oklahoma	4	7	.364	Won 1	1971
Missouri	15	8	.652	Lost 1	1977
South Carolina	36	16	.692	Won 10	1923
Tennessee	83	74	.529	Won 1	1914
Texas	5	9	.357	Won 1	1948
Texas A&M	15	11	.577	Won 3	1958
Vanderbilt	78	71	.523	Won 3	1924
Totals	979	755	.565		

== Retired numbers ==
Alabama has retired one jersey number, 20 for Wendell Hudson (F), who played Forward for Alabama 1969–1973.
