= 1929–30 Michigan Wolverines men's basketball team =

American college basketball season

1929–30 Michigan Wolverines men's basketball
- Conference: Big Ten Conference
- Record: 9–5 (6–4 Big Ten)
- Head coach: George Veenker
- Captain: Robert Chapman
- Home arena: Yost Field House

1929–30 Big Ten Conference men's basketball standings
	Conf.				Overall
Team	W		L	PCT	W		L	PCT
Purdue	10	–	0	1.000	13	–	2	.867
Wisconsin	8	–	2	.800	15	–	2	.882
Illinois	7	–	5	.583	8	–	8	.500
Indiana	7	–	5	.583	8	–	9	.471
Michigan	6	–	4	.600	9	–	5	.643
Northwestern	6	–	6	.500	8	–	8	.500
Minnesota	3	–	9	.250	8	–	9	.471
Chicago	2	–	10	.167	5	–	12	.294
Ohio State	1	–	9	.100	4	–	11	.267
Iowa	0	–	0	–	4	–	13	.235

The 1929–30 Michigan Wolverines men's basketball team represented the University of Michigan in intercollegiate basketball during the 1929–30 season. The team compiled a 9–5 record, and 6–4 against Big Ten Conference opponents. The team finished in third place in the Big Ten. Robert Chapman was the team captain, and Joe Truskowski was the team's leading scorer with 113 points in 14 games for an average of 8.1 points per game.

== Scoring statistics ==
Player	Games	Field goals	Free throws	Points	Points per game
Joe Truskowski	14	36	41	113	8.1
Tharel Kanitz	13	28	21	77	5.9
James Orwig	14	23	22	68	4.9
Robert Chapman	14	19	15	53	3.8
Henry Weiss	15	17	15	49	3.3
Norman Daniels	12	18	2	38	3.2
Frank Lovell	10	7	2	16	1.6
Joe Downing	5	7	0	14	2.8
Roy Hudson	3	4	1	9	3.0
Girard Ricketts	5	2	4	8	1.6
Howard Jones	2	1	1	3	1.5
Joe Jennett	2	0	0	0	0.0
Totals	14	162	124	448	32.0

== Coaching staff ==
- Franklin Cappon - coach
- Fielding H. Yost - athletic director
