= 1929–30 Alabama Crimson Tide men's basketball team =

American college basketball season

1929–30 Alabama Crimson Tide men's basketball
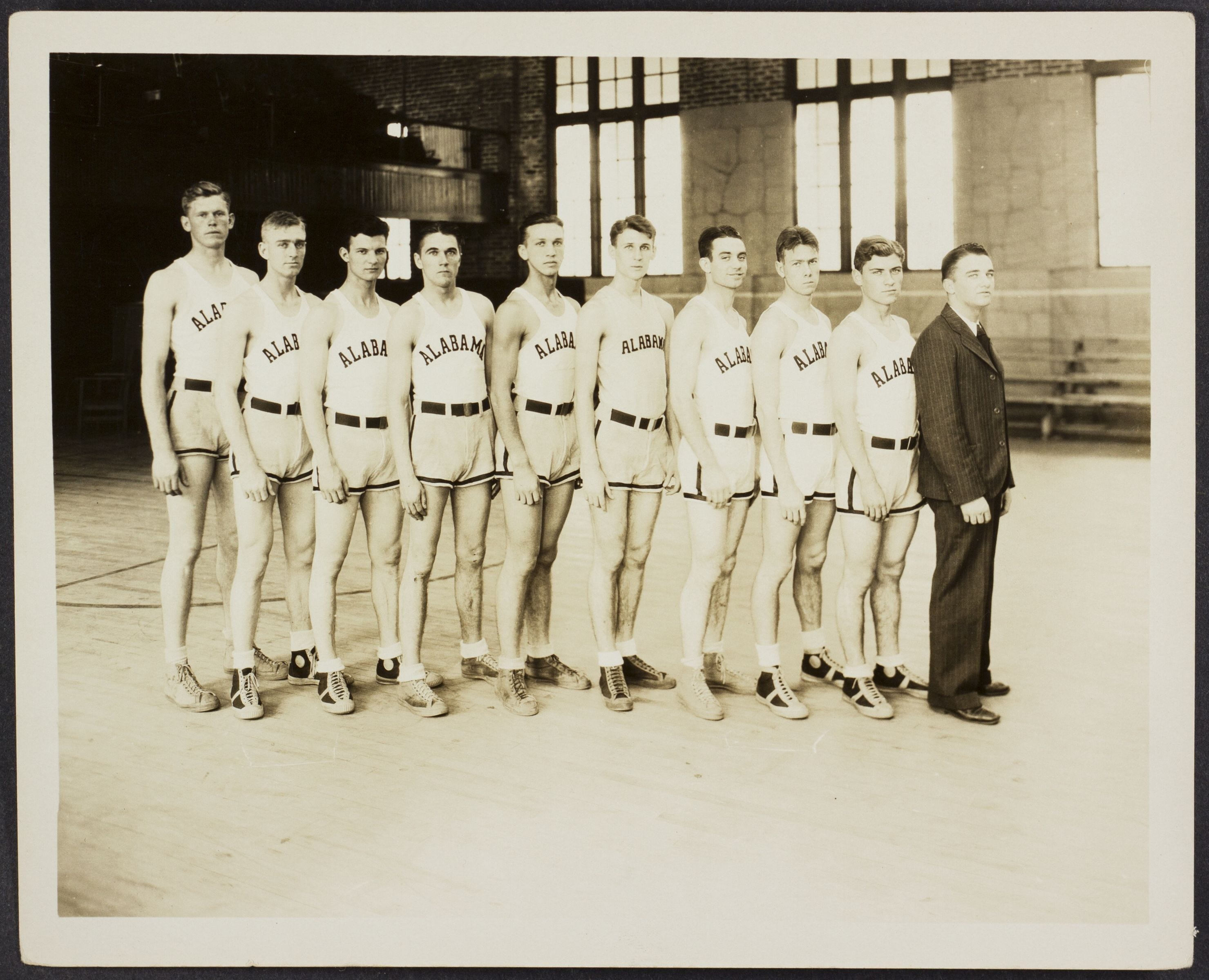
- Conference: Southern Conference
- Record: 20–0 (10–0 SoCon)
- Head coach: Hank Crisp

1929–30 Southern Conference men's basketball standings
	Conf.				Overall
Team	W		L	PCT	W		L	PCT
Alabama †	10	–	0	1.000	20	–	0	1.000
Duke	9	–	1	.900	18	–	2	.900
Kentucky	9	–	1	.900	16	–	3	.842
Washington and Lee	9	–	2	.818	16	–	4	.800
Tennessee	7	–	2	.778	13	–	4	.765
Georgia	7	–	3	.700	17	–	6	.739
Tulane	7	–	3	.700	16	–	7	.696
Clemson	8	–	4	.667	16	–	9	.640
Sewanee	5	–	3	.625	9	–	11	.450
Maryland	8	–	5	.615	16	–	6	.727
NC State	7	–	5	.583	11	–	6	.647
Ole Miss	6	–	6	.500	6	–	7	.462
LSU	6	–	7	.462	10	–	11	.476
Florida	2	–	3	.400	10	–	4	.714
Georgia Tech	5	–	8	.385	11	–	13	.458
North Carolina	4	–	7	.364	14	–	11	.560
VMI	2	–	6	.250	4	–	10	.286
Mississippi A&M	2	–	7	.222	5	–	8	.385
Virginia	2	–	8	.200	3	–	12	.200
Virginia Tech	2	–	10	.167	5	–	14	.263
Vanderbilt	1	–	9	.100	6	–	16	.273
Auburn	1	–	10	.091	1	–	10	.091
South Carolina	0	–	10	.000	6	–	10	.375
† Southern Conference Tournament winner

The 1929–30 Alabama Crimson Tide men's basketball team represented the University of Alabama in intercollegiate basketball during the 1929–30 season. The team finished the season with a 20–0 record and was retroactively listed as the top team of the season by the Premo-Porretta Power Poll. The team was led by Lindy Hood.
