= 1929–30 Niagara Purple Eagles men's basketball team =

American college basketball season

1929–30 Niagara Purple Eagles men's basketball
- Conference: Independent
- Record: 9–11
- Head coach: William McCarthy (3rd season)

The 1929–30 Niagara Purple Eagles men's basketball team represented Niagara University during the 1929–30 NCAA college men's basketball season. The head coach was William McCarthy, coaching his third season with the Purple Eagles.

== Schedule ==
Date time, TV	Opponent	Result	Record	Site city, state
	Tuscarora Indians	W 24–22	1–0	Lewiston, NY
	Cornell	L 25–38	1–1	Lewiston, NY
	Johnstown K of C	W 32–26	2–1	Lewiston, NY
	Albany Pharmacy	W 59–33	3–1	Lewiston, NY
	Albany Law	W 28–20	4–1	Lewiston, NY
	Ashland College	L 31–42	4–2	Lewiston, NY
	Buffalo State	W 44–32	5–2	Lewiston, NY
	St. Lawrence	L 27–32	5–3	Lewiston, NY
	Alfred	L 14–26	5–4	Lewiston, NY
	Fredonia State	W 37–27	6–4	Lewiston, NY
	Hobart	W 17–15	7–4	Lewiston, NY
	Rochester	L 23–38	7–5	Lewiston, NY
	St. Lawrence	L 28–32	7–6	Lewiston, NY
	Clarkson Tech	W 38–34	8–6	Lewiston, NY
	Clarkson Tech	W 45–15	9–6	Lewiston, NY
	Rochester	L 25–32	9–7	Lewiston, NY
	Buffalo	L 35–45	9–8	Lewiston, NY
	Alfred	L 21–33	9–9	Lewiston, NY
3/09/1930	at St. Bonaventure	L 33–51	9–10	Butler Gym; Olean, NY
	Buffalo	L 23–41	9–11	Lewiston, NY
*Non-conference game. (#) Tournament seedings in parentheses.
