= 1929–30 Illinois Fighting Illini men's basketball team =

American college basketball season

1929–30 Illinois Fighting Illini men's basketball
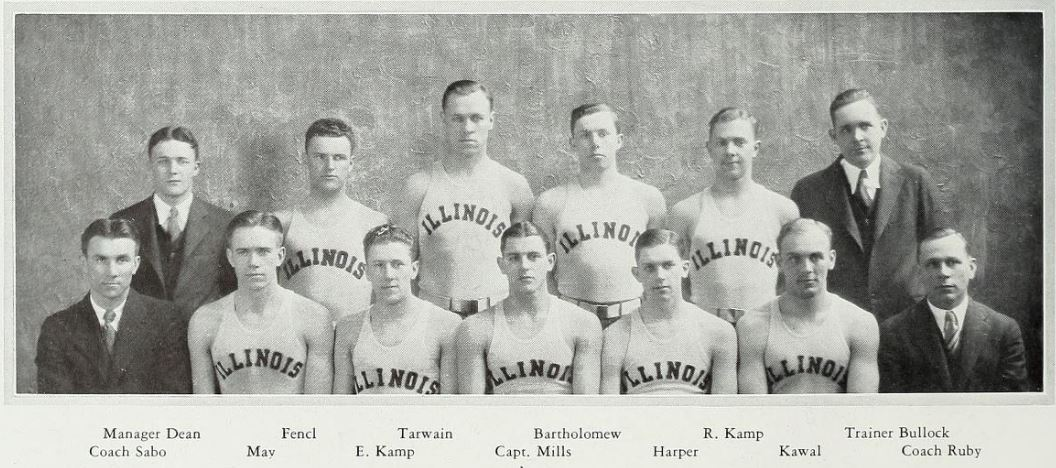
- Conference: Big Ten Conference
- Record: 8–8 (7–5 Big Ten)
- Head coach: J. Craig Ruby (8th season)
- Assistant coaches: John P. Sabo (2nd season); Carl Voyles (1st season)
- Captain: Doug Mills
- Home arena: Huff Hall

1929–30 Big Ten Conference men's basketball standings
	Conf.				Overall
Team	W		L	PCT	W		L	PCT
Purdue	10	–	0	1.000	13	–	2	.867
Wisconsin	8	–	2	.800	15	–	2	.882
Illinois	7	–	5	.583	8	–	8	.500
Indiana	7	–	5	.583	8	–	9	.471
Michigan	6	–	4	.600	9	–	5	.643
Northwestern	6	–	6	.500	8	–	8	.500
Minnesota	3	–	9	.250	8	–	9	.471
Chicago	2	–	10	.167	5	–	12	.294
Ohio State	1	–	9	.100	4	–	11	.267
Iowa	0	–	0	–	4	–	13	.235

The 1929–30 Illinois Fighting Illini men's basketball team represented the University of Illinois.

== Regular season ==
The 1929–30 season was head coach Craig Ruby's 8th at the University of Illinois. Ruby had 3 returning lettermen from a team that had finished in a fifth place tie in the Big Ten the year before. The Fighting Illini showed no improvement in overall play, finishing with a record of 8 wins and 8 losses, though it improved to a conference record of 7 wins and 5 losses. The starting lineup included captain and future Illini head coach Douglas R. Mills, George Fencl and Robert Kamp at guard, Elbridge May at center with Charles Harper and Elbert Kamp at the forward spots.

=== Roster ===
1929–30 Illinois Fighting Illini men's basketball team
Players
Coaches

Pos.	#	Name	Height	Weight	Year	Hometown
F	3	Charles Harper	5 ft 11 in (1.8 m)	158 lb (72 kg)	Jr	Chandlerville, Illinois
G	4	Robert Kamp	5 ft 10 in (1.78 m)	160 lb (73 kg)	So	Mt. Carmel, Illinois
F	5	Elbert Kamp	5 ft 11 in (1.8 m)	150 lb (68 kg)	So	Mt. Carmel, Illinois
C	6	Elbridge Horace May	6 ft 4 in (1.93 m)	185 lb (84 kg)	Jr	Chicago, Illinois
G	7	Douglas R. Mills (C)	5 ft 10 in (1.78 m)	162 lb (73 kg)	Sr	Elgin, Illinois
C	8	Ed J. Kawal	6 ft 0 in (1.83 m)	183 lb (83 kg)	So	Cicero, Illinois
G	9	Herbert Hill	5 ft 8 in (1.73 m)	145 lb (66 kg)	Jr	Elgin, Illinois
G	10	Donald C. Munch	5 ft 9 in (1.75 m)	156 lb (71 kg)	So	Joliet, Illinois
G	11	Buford R. Harper	6 ft 0 in (1.83 m)	170 lb (77 kg)	Sr	Chandlerville, Illinois
C	12	Robert Y. Bartholomew	5 ft 11 in (1.8 m)	155 lb (70 kg)	So	Peoria, Illinois
G	14	William J. Bowron	6 ft 0 in (1.83 m)	160 lb (73 kg)	So	Batavia, Illinois
F	15	Walter J. Doolen	5 ft 11 in (1.8 m)	170 lb (77 kg)	Sr	Kinmundy, Illinois
F	16	Richard Hardin Downing	5 ft 11 in (1.8 m)	165 lb (75 kg)	Jr	Mount Pulaski, Illinois
G	17	Fred L. Wham	6 ft 1 in (1.85 m)	180 lb (82 kg)	Jr	Centralia, Illinois
F	18	John Tarwain	6 ft 2 in (1.88 m)	190 lb (86 kg)	Sr	Sesser, Illinois
G	19	John C. Evans	5 ft 10 in (1.78 m)	170 lb (77 kg)	So	Dayton, Ohio
G	20	Ralph W. Downing	5 ft 11 in (1.8 m)	158 lb (72 kg)	So	Mount Pulaski, Illinois
G	21	George S. Fencl	5 ft 8 in (1.73 m)	158 lb (72 kg)	So	Cicero, Illinois
F	22	Robert C. Van Ness	5 ft 11 in (1.8 m)	137 lb (62 kg)	So	Fort Wayne, Indiana
F	23	Fred Shankman	5 ft 8 in (1.73 m)	158 lb (72 kg)	Jr	Chicago, Illinois
G	24	Glen Hummer	6 ft 0 in (1.83 m)	170 lb (77 kg)	Jr	Peoria, Illinois
F	25	Douglas Henry Salisbury	5 ft 11 in (1.8 m)	160 lb (73 kg)	So	Aurora, Illinois
F	26	Robert L. Greene	6 ft 0 in (1.83 m)	160 lb (73 kg)	Jr	Peoria, Illinois
G	27	Marvin L. Hadam	5 ft 9 in (1.75 m)	160 lb (73 kg)	Jr	Peoria, Illinois
G	28	Wesley H. Morgan	5 ft 10 in (1.78 m)	150 lb (68 kg)	So	Kinmundy, Illinois
G	29	Ernest Landrey Martin	6 ft 0 in (1.83 m)	185 lb (84 kg)	Jr	East Lynn, Illinois
G	30	Herman Charles Troch	5 ft 10 in (1.78 m)	160 lb (73 kg)	Jr	Chicago, Illinois
F	31	James R. Dorsey	5 ft 7 in (1.7 m)	135 lb (61 kg)	Jr	Wilmington, Illinois
F	32	Theodore J. Blum	6 ft 3 in (1.91 m)	185 lb (84 kg)	Sr	Oak Park, Illinois
F	33	Charles R. Canfield	6 ft 1 in (1.85 m)	172 lb (78 kg)	So	Kalamazoo, Michigan
F	34	William T. Brydges	5 ft 10 in (1.78 m)	145 lb (66 kg)	So	Chicago, Illinois
G	35	Rolland James Lunds	6 ft 0 in (1.83 m)	167 lb (76 kg)	So	Keasbey, New Jersey
G	36	Elmer Moos	6 ft 0 in (1.83 m)	175 lb (79 kg)	Jr	Aurora, Illinois
C	37	Henry J. Steinman	5 ft 10 in (1.78 m)	183 lb (83 kg)	So	Melvin, Illinois

Head coach

- Craig Ruby (University of Missouri) (8th year)

Assistant coach(es)

- John Sabo (University of Illinois) (2nd year)
- Carl Voyles (Oklahoma A&M) (1st year)

Legend

- (C) Team captain
- (S) Suspended
- (I) Ineligible
- (W) Walk-on
- Injured
- Current redshirt

Roster

== Schedule ==
Date time, TV	Rank^{#}	Opponent^{#}	Result	Record	Site (attendance) city, state
Non-Conference regular season
12/14/1929*		Bradley	L 22–30	0–1	New Gymnasium (5,532); Champaign, IL
12/19/1929*		Washington University	W 30–19	1–1	New Gymnasium (4,901); Champaign, IL
12/23/1929*		DePauw	W 30–19	2–1	New Gymnasium (–); Champaign, IL
1/2/1930*		at Butler	L 18–28	2–2	Hinkle Fieldhouse (–); Indianapolis, IN
Big Ten regular season
1/6/1930		Ohio State	W 19–15	3–2 (1–0)	New Gymnasium (5,926); Champaign, IL
1/13/1930		at Michigan	W 24–18	4–2 (2–0)	Yost Field House (–); Ann Arbor, MI
1/18/1930		at Wisconsin	L 9–14	4–3 (2–1)	University of Wisconsin Armory and Gymnasium (–); Madison, WI
2/5/1930		University of Chicago	W 28–25	5–3 (3–1)	New Gymnasium (6,924); Champaign, IL
2/8/1930		at Minnesota	L 21–26	5–4 (3–2)	Williams Arena (–); Minneapolis, MN
2/10/1930*		at Northwestern; Rivalry	W 30–24	6–4 (4–2)	Patten Gymnasium (–); Evanston, IL
2/15/1930		Minnesota	W 26–22	7–4 (5–2)	New Gymnasium (5,739); Champaign, IL
2/17/1930		at Ohio State	W 26–16	7–5 (6–2)	Ohio Expo Center Coliseum (–); Columbus, OH
2/22/1930		Northwestern; Rivalry	L 32–34	7–6 (6–3)	New Gymnasium (6,591); Champaign, IL
2/24/1930		Wisconsin	L 17–23	7–7 (6–4)	New Gymnasium (6,905); Champaign, IL
3/1/1930		Michigan	W 30–17	8–7 (7–4)	New Gymnasium (6,900); Champaign, IL
3/5/1930		at University of Chicago	L 22–35	8–8 (7–5)	Bartlett Gymnasium; Chicago, IL
*Non-conference game. ^{#}Rankings from AP Poll. (#) Tournament seedings in parentheses. All times are in Central Time.
