= 1929–30 Wisconsin Badgers men's basketball team =

American college basketball season

1929–30 Wisconsin Badgers men's basketball
- Conference: Big Ten Conference
- Record: 15–2 (8–2 Big Ten)
- Head coach: Walter Meanwell
- Home arena: Red Gym

1929–30 Big Ten Conference men's basketball standings
	Conf.				Overall
Team	W		L	PCT	W		L	PCT
Purdue	10	–	0	1.000	13	–	2	.867
Wisconsin	8	–	2	.800	15	–	2	.882
Illinois	7	–	5	.583	8	–	8	.500
Indiana	7	–	5	.583	8	–	9	.471
Michigan	6	–	4	.600	9	–	5	.643
Northwestern	6	–	6	.500	8	–	8	.500
Minnesota	3	–	9	.250	8	–	9	.471
Chicago	2	–	10	.167	5	–	12	.294
Ohio State	1	–	9	.100	4	–	11	.267
Iowa	0	–	0	–	4	–	13	.235

The 1929–30 Wisconsin Badgers men's basketball team represented University of Wisconsin–Madison. The head coach was Walter Meanwell, coaching his sixteenth season with the Badgers. The team played their home games at the Red Gym in Madison, Wisconsin and was a member of the Big Ten Conference.

== Schedule ==
Date time, TV	Rank^{#}	Opponent^{#}	Result	Record	Site city, state
Regular Season
12/14/1929*		Monmouth (IL)	W 28–10	1–0	Red Gym; Madison, Wisconsin
12/19/1929*		Carleton (MN)	W 27–18	2–0	Red Gym; Madison, Wisconsin
12/28/1929*		Lombard (IL)	W 22–11	3–0	Red Gym; Madison, Wisconsin
12/31/1929*		Iowa State	W 34–17	4–0	Red Gym; Madison, Wisconsin
1/04/1930		at Northwestern	L 14–23	4–1 (0–1)	Patten Gymnasium; Evanston, Illinois
1/11/1930		at Ohio State	W 32–25	5–1 (1–1)	Ohio Expo Center Coliseum; Columbus, Ohio
1/18/1930		Illinois	W 14–9	6–1 (2–1)	Red Gym; Madison, Wisconsin
1/20/1930		Chicago	W 33–23	7–1 (3–1)	Red Gym; Madison, Wisconsin
1/23/1930		at Indiana	W 23–21 ^{OT}	8–1 (4–1)	The Fieldhouse; Bloomington, Indiana
2/08/1930*		Carroll (WI)	W 22–13	9–1	Red Gym; Madison, Wisconsin
2/12/1930*		Marquette	W 29–15	10–1	Red Gym; Madison, Wisconsin
2/13/1930*		Marquette	W 29–22	11–1	Marquette Gymnasium; Milwaukee
2/15/1930		Northwestern	W 29–22	12–1 (5–1)	Red Gym; Madison, Wisconsin
2/22/1930		at Chicago	L 21–23	12–2 (5–2)	Bartlett Gymnasium; Chicago
2/24/1930		at Illinois	W 23–17	13–2 (6–2)	Huff Hall; Champaign, Illinois
3/03/1930		Ohio State	W 32–23	14–2 (7–2)	Red Gym; Madison, Wisconsin
3/08/1930		Indiana	W 34–23	15–2 (8–2)	Red Gym; Madison, Wisconsin
*Non-conference game. ^{#}Rankings from AP Poll. (#) Tournament seedings in parentheses.
