= 1929–30 Buffalo Bisons men's basketball team =

American college basketball season

1929–30 Buffalo Bisons men's basketball
- Conference: Independent
- Record: 15–1
- Head coach: Art Powell (15th season)

The 1929–30 Buffalo Bisons men's basketball team represented the University of Buffalo during the 1929–30 NCAA college men's basketball season. The head coach was Art Powell, coaching his fifteenth season with the Bisons.

== Schedule ==
Date time, TV	Opponent	Result	Record	Site city, state
	Buffalo State	W 46–19	1–0	Buffalo, NY
	Toronto	W 37–19	2–0	Buffalo, NY
	Ohio	W 41–23	3–0	Buffalo, NY
	Thiel	W 28–20	4–0	Buffalo, NY
	Lafayette	W 39–21	5–0	Buffalo, NY
	at St. Lawrence	L 26–31	5–1	Canton, NY
	at Clarkson	W 34–22	6–1	
	at Rochester	W 30–28	7–1	Rochester, NY
	St. Lawrence	W 27–17	8–1	Buffalo, NY
	Alfred	W 45–17	9–1	Buffalo, NY
	at Hobart	W 38–19	10–1	Geneva, NY
	Clarkson	W 48–22	11–1	Buffalo, NY
	Hamilton	W 54–18	12–1	Buffalo, NY
	at Niagara	W 45–35	13–1	Lewiston, NY
	Rochester	W 37–30	14–1	Buffalo, NY
	Niagara	W 41–23	15–1	Buffalo, NY
*Non-conference game. (#) Tournament seedings in parentheses.
