= Victor Dauer =

American football and baseball coach

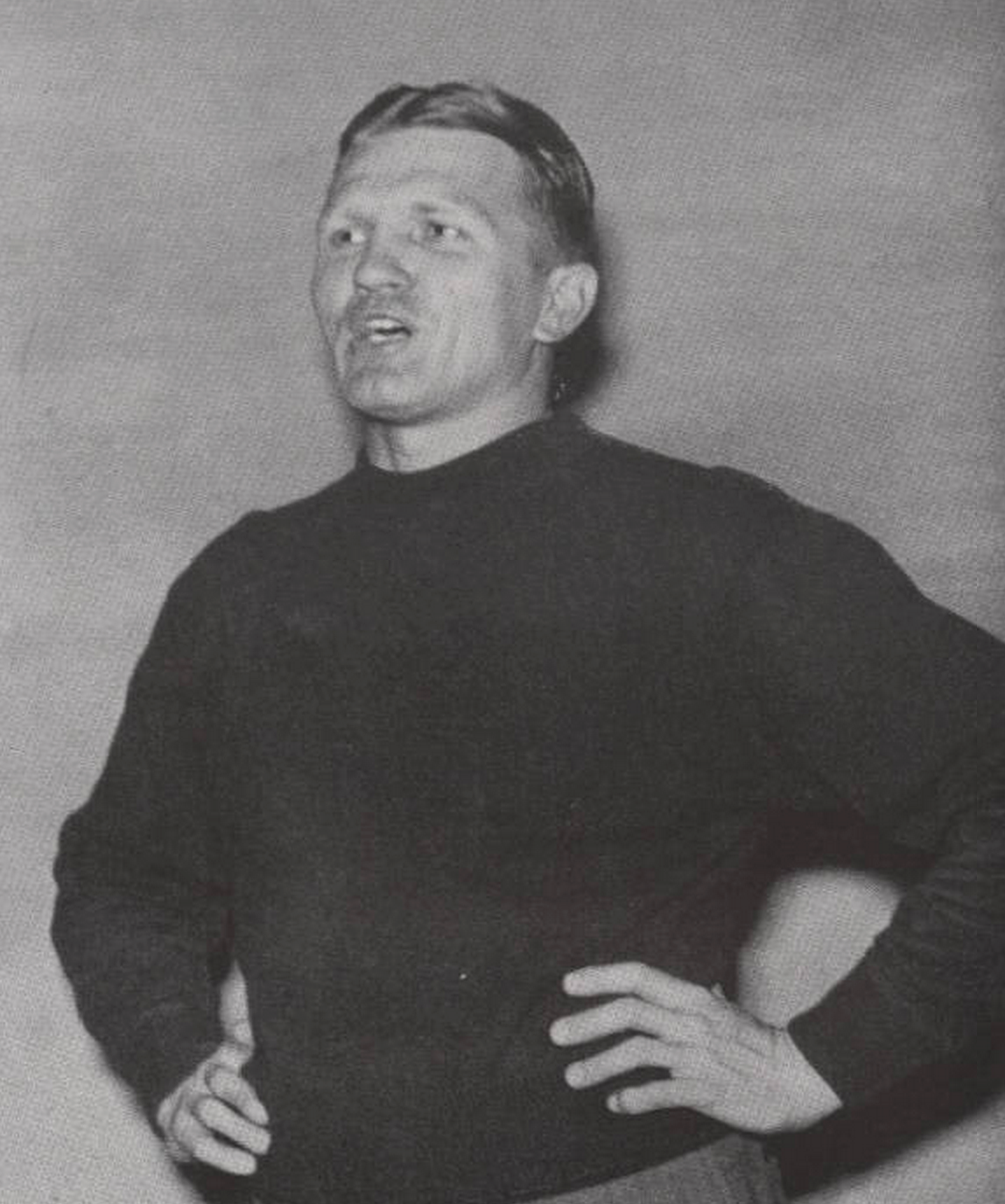
- Dauer pictured in The Beacon 1942, Valparaiso yearbook

Biographical details
- Born: April 14, 1909; Hammond, Indiana, U.S.
- Died: September 30, 2000 (aged 91)

Playing career

Football
- 1929–1931: Indiana

Basketball
- 1930–1933: Indiana

Coaching career (HC unless noted)

Football
- 1934–1935: Cannelton HS (IN)
- 1936: Muncie Central HS (IN) (assistant)
- 1937–1940: Wabash HS (IN)
- 1941: Valparaiso
- 1943: Camp Davis (assistant)

Basketball
- 1943–1944: Camp Davis

Baseball
- 1942: Valparaiso

Administrative career (AD unless noted)
- 1941–1942: Valparaiso
- 1947–?: Springfield (MA) (assistant AD)

Head coaching record
- Overall: 0–8 (college football); 0–1 (college baseball)

Victor P. Dauer (April 14, 1909 – September 30, 2000) was an American football and baseball coach and college athletics administrator. He served as the head football and head baseball coach at Valparaiso University during the 1941–42 academic year.

Dauer was born on April 14, 1909, in Hammond, Indiana. He graduated from Emerson High School in Gary, Indiana. He played college football and college basketball at Indiana University Bloomington.

Dauer served as an officer in the United States Army during World War II. He was an assistant coach for the 1943 Camp Davis Fighting AA's football team and was head coach of Camp Davis's basketball team in 1943–44.

In 1947, he was appointed assistant professor and assistant athletic director Springfield College in Springfield, Massachusetts. In 1949, he moved to Washington State University as an assistant professor in the Men's Physical Education Department. Dauer earned a PhD in education from the University of Michigan in 1951.

== Head coaching record ==
=== College football ===
Year	Team	Overall	Conference	Standing	Bowl/playoffs
Valparaiso Crusaders (Indiana Intercollegiate Conference) (1941)
1941	Valparaiso	0–8	0–5	T–13th	
Valparaiso:		0–8	0–5		
Total:		0–8			
