= 1929–30 Duke Blue Devils men's basketball team =

American college basketball season

1929–30 Duke Blue Devils men's basketball

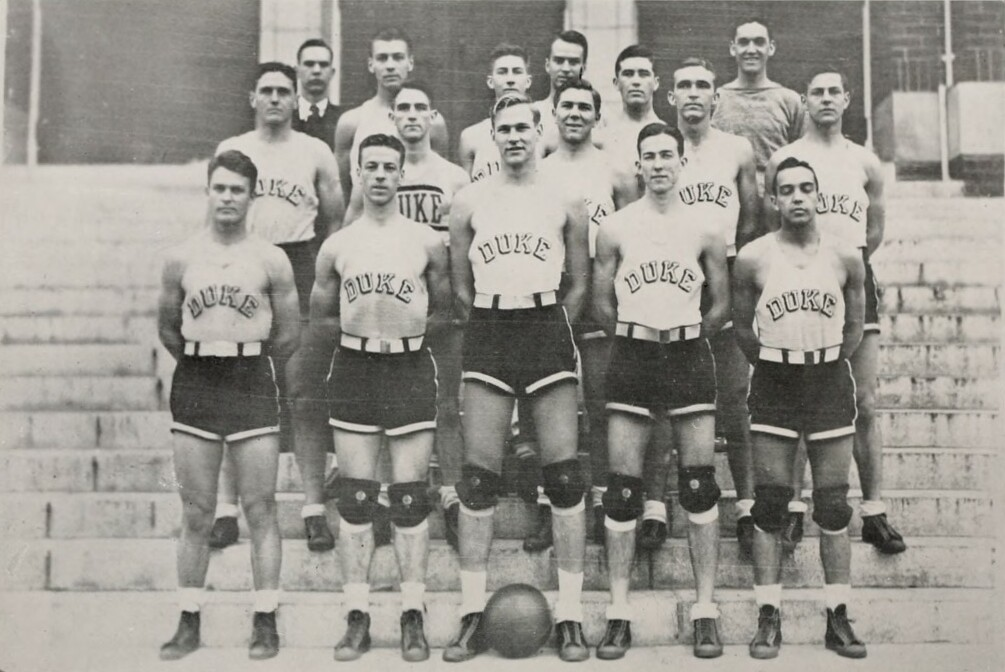
- Conference: Southern Conference
- Record: 18–2 (9–1 Southern)
- Head coach: Eddie Cameron
- Home arena: Alumni Memorial Gymnasium

1929–30 Southern Conference men's basketball standings
	Conf.				Overall
Team	W		L	PCT	W		L	PCT
Alabama †	10	–	0	1.000	20	–	0	1.000
Duke	9	–	1	.900	18	–	2	.900
Kentucky	9	–	1	.900	16	–	3	.842
Washington and Lee	9	–	2	.818	16	–	4	.800
Tennessee	7	–	2	.778	13	–	4	.765
Georgia	7	–	3	.700	17	–	6	.739
Tulane	7	–	3	.700	16	–	7	.696
Clemson	8	–	4	.667	16	–	9	.640
Sewanee	5	–	3	.625	9	–	11	.450
Maryland	8	–	5	.615	16	–	6	.727
NC State	7	–	5	.583	11	–	6	.647
Ole Miss	6	–	6	.500	6	–	7	.462
LSU	6	–	7	.462	10	–	11	.476
Florida	2	–	3	.400	10	–	4	.714
Georgia Tech	5	–	8	.385	11	–	13	.458
North Carolina	4	–	7	.364	14	–	11	.560
VMI	2	–	6	.250	4	–	10	.286
Mississippi A&M	2	–	7	.222	5	–	8	.385
Virginia	2	–	8	.200	3	–	12	.200
Virginia Tech	2	–	10	.167	5	–	14	.263
Vanderbilt	1	–	9	.100	6	–	16	.273
Auburn	1	–	10	.091	1	–	10	.091
South Carolina	0	–	10	.000	6	–	10	.375
† Southern Conference Tournament winner

The 1929–30 Duke Blue Devils men's basketball team represented Duke University during the 1929–30 men's college basketball season. The head coach was Eddie Cameron, coaching his second season with the Blue Devils. The team finished with an overall record of 18–2.
