= Lindy Hood =

American basketball player (1907–1972)

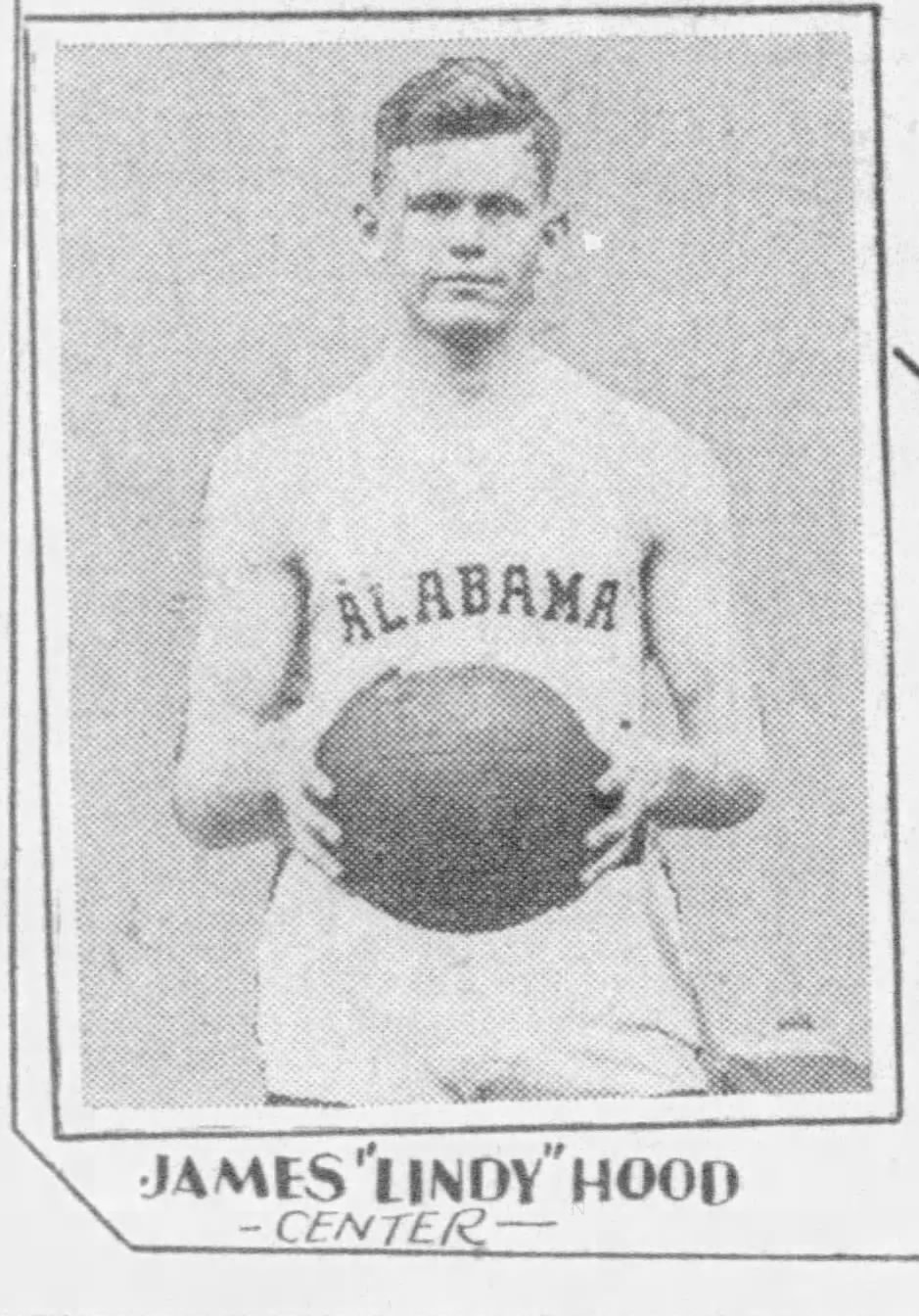

Personal information
- Born: July 30, 1907 Leesburg, Alabama, U.S.
- Died: October 17, 1972 (aged 65) Pierceton, Indiana, U.S.
- Listed height: 6 ft 5 in (1.96 m)

Career information
- High school: Collinsville (Collinsville, Alabama)
- College: Alabama (1929–1931)
- Position: Center

Career highlights
- First-team All-American – College Humor (1931)

James Marcus "Lindy" Hood (July 30, 1907 – October 17, 1972) was a college basketball All-American center for the University of Alabama. At Alabama, Hood is noted for being their first All-American men's basketball player in 1931 and as the leader of the undefeated 1929–30 Crimson Tide squad. Hood's nickname "Lindy" came during his playing days with Alabama during a trip to New Orleans to play Tulane. As he entered a hotel lobby, a crowd mistook Hood for Charles Lindbergh and thus the nickname "Lindy" was given to him. Hood was posthumously inducted into the Alabama Sports Hall of Fame in 1990.
