= 1923 Canisius football team =

American college football season

1923 Canisius football

Western New York champion
- Conference: Independent
- Record: 8–1
- Head coach: Luke Urban (3rd season)
- Captain: Russell Burt

1923 Eastern college football independents records
	Conf.			Overall
Team	W	L	T	W		L		T
Cornell		–		8	–	0	–	0
Yale		–		8	–	0	–	0
St. John's		–		5	–	0	–	1
Dartmouth		–		8	–	1	–	0
Syracuse		–		8	–	1	–	0
Boston College		–		7	–	1	–	1
Rutgers		–		7	–	1	–	1
Washington & Jefferson		–		6	–	1	–	1
Holy Cross		–		8	–	2	–	0
Lafayette		–		6	–	1	–	2
Tufts		–		6	–	2	–	0
Army		–		6	–	2	–	1
Colgate		–		6	–	2	–	1
Geneva		–		6	–	2	–	1
Lehigh		–		6	–	2	–	1
NYU		–		6	–	2	–	1
Penn State		–		6	–	2	–	1
Vermont		–		6	–	3	–	1
Brown		–		6	–	4	–	0
Harvard		–		4	–	3	–	1
Carnegie Tech		–		4	–	3	–	1
Penn		–		5	–	4	–	0
Pittsburgh		–		5	–	4	–	0
Bucknell		–		4	–	4	–	1
Columbia		–		4	–	4	–	1
Duquesne		–		4	–	4	–	0
Princeton		–		3	–	3	–	1
Franklin & Marshall		–		3	–	5	–	1
Drexel		–		2	–	6	–	0
Buffalo		–		2	–	5	–	1
Fordham		–		2	–	7	–	0
Boston University		–		1	–	6	–	0
Villanova		–		0	–	7	–	1
Temple		–		0	–	5	–	0
CCNY		–		0	–	7	–	0
Springfield		–		0	–	7	–	0

The 1923 Canisius football team represented Canisius College as an independent during the 1923 college football season. Canisius compiled an 8–1 record, shut out eight of nine opponents, and outscored all opponents by a total of 27 to 21. Luke Urban was the head coach for the third consecutive year, and Russell Burt served as the team captain. Trainer Jimmy Hutch was credited for having "kept the Jesuit mole skin artists in trim throughout the season."

Key players included Russell Burt, Louie Feist, "Chick" Guarnieri, and Ned Weldon.

== Schedule ==
Date	Opponent	Site	Result	Source
October 6	Rochester School of Optometry	The Villa; Buffalo, NY	W 69–0	
October 13	Washington College	Buffalo NY	W 14–0	
October 20	at Boston College	Braves Field; Boston, MA	L 0–21	
October 27	Dayton	Canisius Field; Buffalo, NY	W 12–0	
November 6	Niagara	The Villa; Buffalo, NY	W 17–0	
November 10	Saint Francis (PA)	Canisius Field; Buffalo, NY	W 54–0	
November 17	John Carroll	The Villa; Buffalo, NY	W 30–0	
November 24	St. Bonaventure	The Villa; Buffalo, NY	W 3–0	
December 1	Norwich	The Villa; Buffalo, NY	W 28–0	
