= Art Deibel =

American football player (1896–1984)

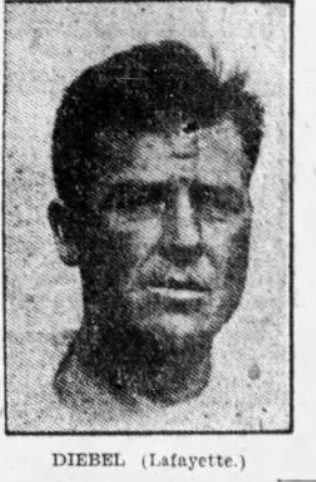
- Deibel in 1926

No. 15
- Positions: Tackle, guard

Personal information
- Born: April 3, 1896; Clinton, Ohio, U.S.
- Died: April 23, 1984 (aged 88); Massillon, Ohio, U.S.
- Listed height: 6 ft 3 in (1.91 m)
- Listed weight: 220 lb (100 kg)

Career information
- High school: Clinton
- College: Lafayette

Career history
- Millville Big Blue (1925); Canton Bulldogs (1926)

Awards and highlights
- Lafayette captain (1923); Millville Big Blue captain (1925); Won "New Jersey Championship" (1925)

Career NFL statistics
- Games played: 7
- Games started: 6

Arthur Francis Deibel (April 3, 1896 – April 23, 1984) was a professional football player who spent a year in the National Football League (NFL) with the Canton Bulldogs in 1926. Prior to joining the NFL, Deibel played and was the captain of the Millville Football & Athletic Club, a successful independent club from New Jersey that was headed up by Guy Chamberlin. After a highly successful 1925 season, the Big Blue played a series of pick-up games against Red Grange and the Tampa Cardinals in Florida. The Big Blue won the series with a record of 3–0–1. Deibel played college football at Lafayette College. He was named captain of the 1923 Lafayette football team.

Deibel died on April 23, 1984, at Doctors Hospital in Massillon, Ohio.
