= James Bond (American football) =

American football player and coach (1894–1956)

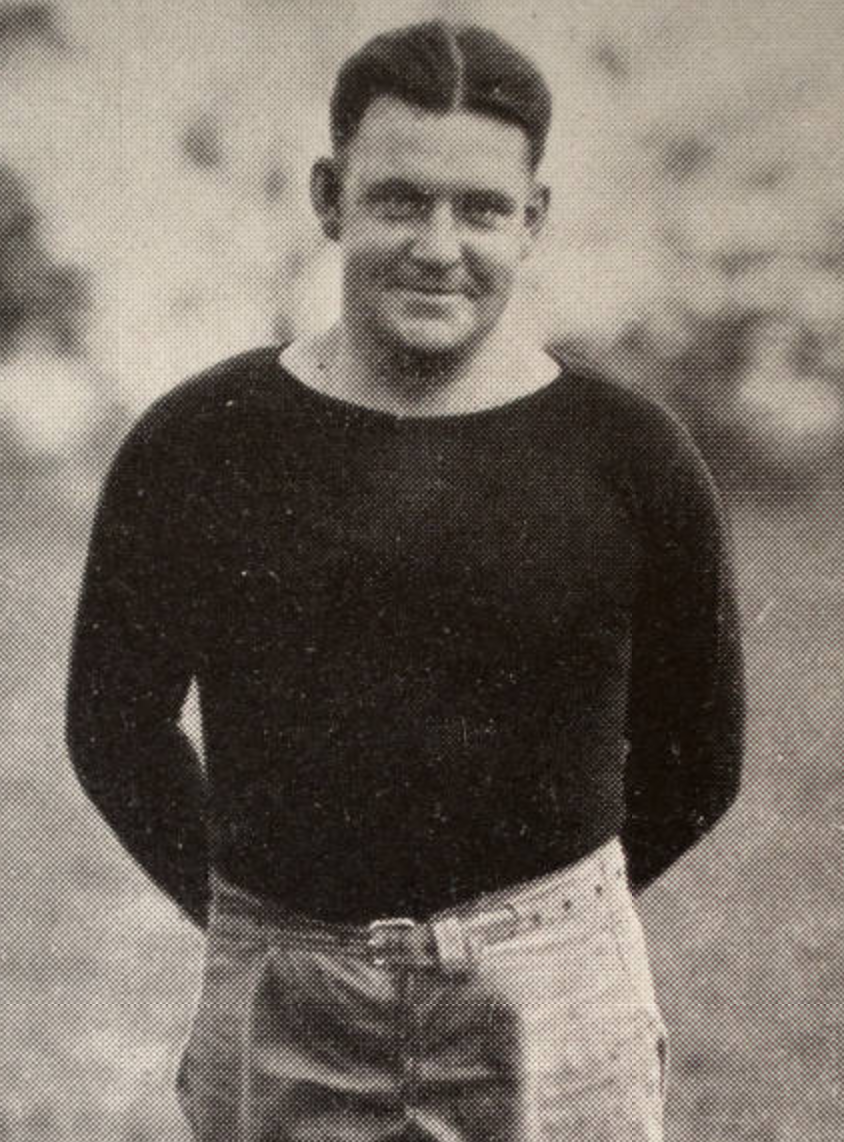

Profile
- Position: Guard

Personal information
- Born: February 14, 1894; Painesville, Ohio, U.S.
- Died: April 9, 1956 (aged 62); Pittsburgh, Pennsylvania, U.S.

Career information
- College: Pittsburgh

Career history

Playing
- 1915–1916, 1919–1920: Pittsburgh
- 1926: Brooklyn Lions

Coaching
- 1922: Centre (assistant)
- 1923: Buffalo
- 1924: Canisius (assistant)
- 1925: Albright

athletic director
- 1925–1926: Albright

Career statistics
- Head coaching record: 4–11–1

Other information
- Military career
- Allegiance: United States
- Branch: U.S. Army
- Service years: 1916–1918
- Unit: 82nd Infantry Division
- Conflicts: World War I: Western Front; Battle of Saint-Mihiel

James Donald Bond Jr. (February 14, 1894 – April 9, 1956) was an American professional football player and coach. He played college football at the University of Pittsburgh from 1915 to 1920, with his career being interrupted by military service and injuries sustained in World War I. He also played in the National Football League for the Brooklyn Lions in 1926. He coached college football at Centre College (1922), the University of Buffalo (1923), Canisius College (1924), and Albright College (1925).

== Pittsburgh ==
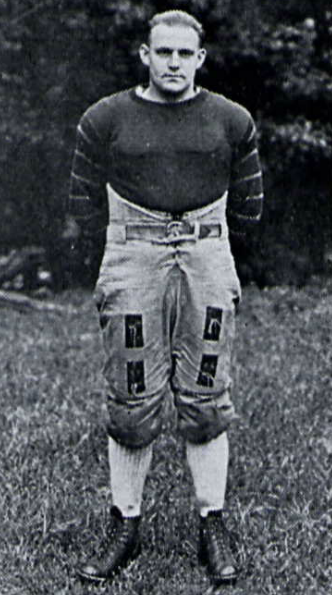
Bond from "The Owl" of 1922

Bond was born in Painesville, Ohio, and grew up in the Morningside neighborhood in Pittsburgh. He attended Central High School in Pittsburgh, where he competed for the school's football, baseball, and track teams.

In 1914, Bond enrolled at the University of Pittsburgh and played college football as a reserve guard in 1915 and 1916 for the Pittsburgh Panthers under head coach Glenn Scobey "Pop" Warner. His college career was interrupted by military service during World War I. He was assigned to Camp Gordon, where he played for the camp's football team. He was subsequently deployed with the 82nd Infantry Division to France where he was "wounded and gassed" at the Battle of Saint-Mihiel.

After several months recuperating, Bond returned to Pitt in August 1919. The Pittsburgh Press reported on Bond's return as follows: "Jim Bond ... is another hero of the world war, and was injured in action in France. He has entirely recovered from his wound, and will be with the Panthers this fall." After the 1919 Pitt-West Virginia game, one sports columnist wrote: "Pop Warner did not have to waste much time in making a guard out of Bond, who looks like a find." He played for Pitt's varsity football teams in 1919 and 1920, graduating in 1921.

== Coaching career ==
Bond began his coaching career as an assistant coach under Charley Moran at Centre College in 1922. Centre's 1922 team finished with an 8–2 record, including victories over Clemson (21–0), Ole Miss (55–0), Virginia Tech (10–6), Louisville (32–7), Kentucky (27–3), and South Carolina (42–0), and a narrow loss to Auburn (6–0). After only one year at Centre, Bond was hired as the head coach of the University of Buffalo football team. In his one season at Buffalo, the 1923 Bisons compiled a 2–5–1 record. Bond resigned as the team's head coach at the end of the season He subsequently served as a football coach at Canisius College in 1924 and the athletic director and football coach at Albright College from 1925 through the spring of 1926.

== Brooklyn Lions ==
In the spring of 1926, Bond retired from coaching and returned to Pittsburgh. In the fall of 1926, Bond played one season of professional football as a guard for the Brooklyn Lions of the National Football League. He started two games for the Lions.

== Later life ==
Bond was later employed by a refining company in Pittsburgh. He also worked as a baseball umpire and served as an official of the Pittsburgh Umpires Association. At the time of the 1930 U.S. Census, Bond was living in Pittsburgh and working as a salesman for an oil refining company. As of April 1942, Bond was living in Allegheny County, Pennsylvania, and was employed by the Atlantic Refining Company. He died on April 9, 1956, in Pittsburgh.

== Head coaching record ==
Year	Team	Overall	Conference	Standing	Bowl/playoffs
Buffalo Bisons (Independent) (1923)
1923	Buffalo	2–5–1			
Buffalo:		2–5–1			
Albright Red and White (Independent) (1925)
1925	Albright	2–6			
Albright:		2–6			
Total:		4–11–1			

== See also ==
- List of Brooklyn Lions players
