= 1923 Boston College Eagles football team =

American college football season

1923 Boston College Eagles football
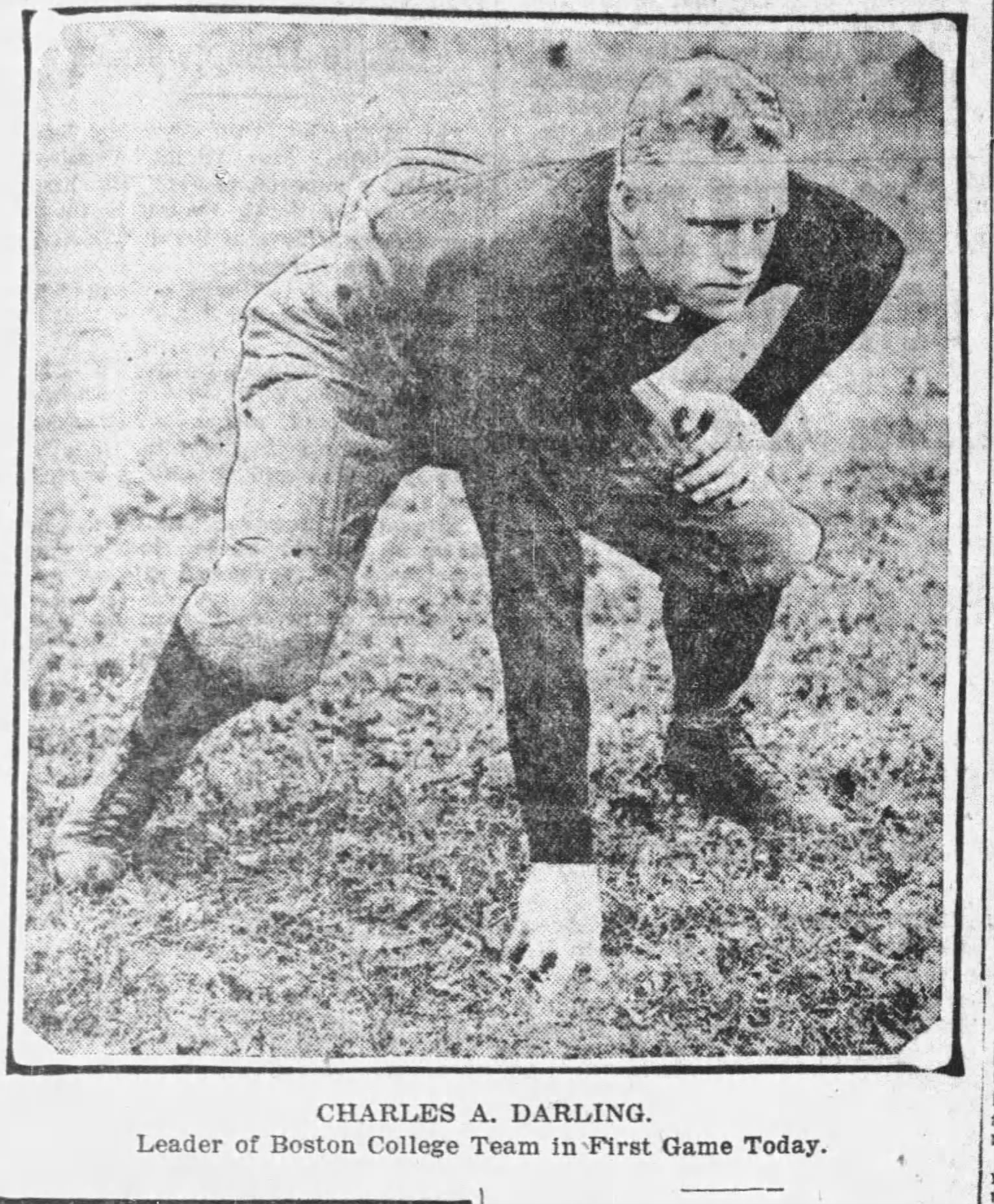
- Charles A. Darling, team captain
- Conference: Independent
- Record: 7–1–1
- Head coach: Frank Cavanaugh (5th season)
- Captain: Chuck Darling
- Home stadium: Alumni Field, Braves Field

1923 Eastern college football independents records
	Conf.			Overall
Team	W	L	T	W		L		T
Cornell		–		8	–	0	–	0
Yale		–		8	–	0	–	0
St. John's		–		5	–	0	–	1
Dartmouth		–		8	–	1	–	0
Syracuse		–		8	–	1	–	0
Boston College		–		7	–	1	–	1
Rutgers		–		7	–	1	–	1
Washington & Jefferson		–		6	–	1	–	1
Holy Cross		–		8	–	2	–	0
Lafayette		–		6	–	1	–	2
Tufts		–		6	–	2	–	0
Army		–		6	–	2	–	1
Colgate		–		6	–	2	–	1
Geneva		–		6	–	2	–	1
Lehigh		–		6	–	2	–	1
NYU		–		6	–	2	–	1
Penn State		–		6	–	2	–	1
Vermont		–		6	–	3	–	1
Brown		–		6	–	4	–	0
Harvard		–		4	–	3	–	1
Carnegie Tech		–		4	–	3	–	1
Penn		–		5	–	4	–	0
Pittsburgh		–		5	–	4	–	0
Bucknell		–		4	–	4	–	1
Columbia		–		4	–	4	–	1
Duquesne		–		4	–	4	–	0
Princeton		–		3	–	3	–	1
Franklin & Marshall		–		3	–	5	–	1
Drexel		–		2	–	6	–	0
Buffalo		–		2	–	5	–	1
Fordham		–		2	–	7	–	0
Boston University		–		1	–	6	–	0
Villanova		–		0	–	7	–	1
Temple		–		0	–	5	–	0
CCNY		–		0	–	7	–	0
Springfield		–		0	–	7	–	0

The 1923 Boston College Eagles football team represented Boston College an independent during the 1923 college football season. Led by fifth-year head coach Frank Cavanaugh, Boston College compiled a record of 7–1–1.

== Schedule ==
Date	Time	Opponent	Site	Result	Attendance	Source
September 29	3:00 p.m.	Providence College	Alumni Field; Chestnut Hill, MA	W 28–0	5,000	
October 12	2:30 p.m.	Fordham	Braves Field; Boston, MA	W 20–0	18,000	
October 20		Canisius	Braves Field; Boston, MA	W 21–0		
October 27	2:00 p.m.	Marquette	Braves Field; Boston, MA	L 6–7		
November 3	2:00 p.m.	Georgetown	Braves Field; Boston, MA	W 21–0	15,000	
November 10		Centenary	Braves Field; Boston, MA	W 14–0	23,000	
November 17	2:00 p.m.	Villanova	Braves Field; Boston, MA	W 41–0		
November 24	2:00 p.m.	Vermont	Braves Field; Boston, MA	T 0–0		
December 1		Holy Cross	Braves Field; Boston, MA (rivalry)	W 16–7	47,000	
All times are in Eastern time
