= 1923 St. John's Red and White football team =

American college football season

1923 St. John's Red and White football
- Conference: Independent
- Record: 5–0–1
- Head coach: Ray Lynch (1st season)
- Captain: Leo Prendergast
- Home stadium: Ebbets Field

1923 Eastern college football independents records
	Conf.			Overall
Team	W	L	T	W		L		T
Cornell		–		8	–	0	–	0
Yale		–		8	–	0	–	0
St. John's		–		5	–	0	–	1
Dartmouth		–		8	–	1	–	0
Syracuse		–		8	–	1	–	0
Boston College		–		7	–	1	–	1
Rutgers		–		7	–	1	–	1
Washington & Jefferson		–		6	–	1	–	1
Holy Cross		–		8	–	2	–	0
Lafayette		–		6	–	1	–	2
Tufts		–		6	–	2	–	0
Army		–		6	–	2	–	1
Colgate		–		6	–	2	–	1
Geneva		–		6	–	2	–	1
Lehigh		–		6	–	2	–	1
NYU		–		6	–	2	–	1
Penn State		–		6	–	2	–	1
Vermont		–		6	–	3	–	1
Brown		–		6	–	4	–	0
Harvard		–		4	–	3	–	1
Carnegie Tech		–		4	–	3	–	1
Penn		–		5	–	4	–	0
Pittsburgh		–		5	–	4	–	0
Bucknell		–		4	–	4	–	1
Columbia		–		4	–	4	–	1
Duquesne		–		4	–	4	–	0
Princeton		–		3	–	3	–	1
Franklin & Marshall		–		3	–	5	–	1
Drexel		–		2	–	6	–	0
Buffalo		–		2	–	5	–	1
Fordham		–		2	–	7	–	0
Boston University		–		1	–	6	–	0
Villanova		–		0	–	7	–	1
Temple		–		0	–	5	–	0
CCNY		–		0	–	7	–	0
Springfield		–		0	–	7	–	0

The 1923 St. John's Red and White football team was an American football team that represented St. John's College of New York City as an independent during the 1923 college football season. The team compiled a 5–0–1 record and outscored opponents by a total of 111 to 32. The 1923 season marked a return to intercollegiate football for St. John's after an absence of 16 years.

Ray Lynch was the head coach, and Lieutenant J. V. Domminey of West Point was assistant coach. The team was assembled on September 6 and trained for the following month before the first game on October 6.

Right end Leo Prendergast was the team captain.

The team played its home games at Ebbets Field in Brooklyn.

== Schedule ==
Date	Opponent	Site	Result	Source
October 6	at Stevens Tech	Castle Point Field; Hoboken, NJ	W 30–12	
October 12	at Cooper Union	Ebbetts Field; Brooklyn, NY	W 19–0	
October 27	at Fordham	Fordham Field; Bronx, NY	W 13–0	
November 3	Springfield	Ebbetts Field; Brooklyn, NY	W 20–7	
November 10	Niagara	Ebbetts Field; Brooklyn, NY	W 23–7	
November 17	Providence College	Ebbetts Field; Brooklyn, NY	T 6–6	

== Players ==
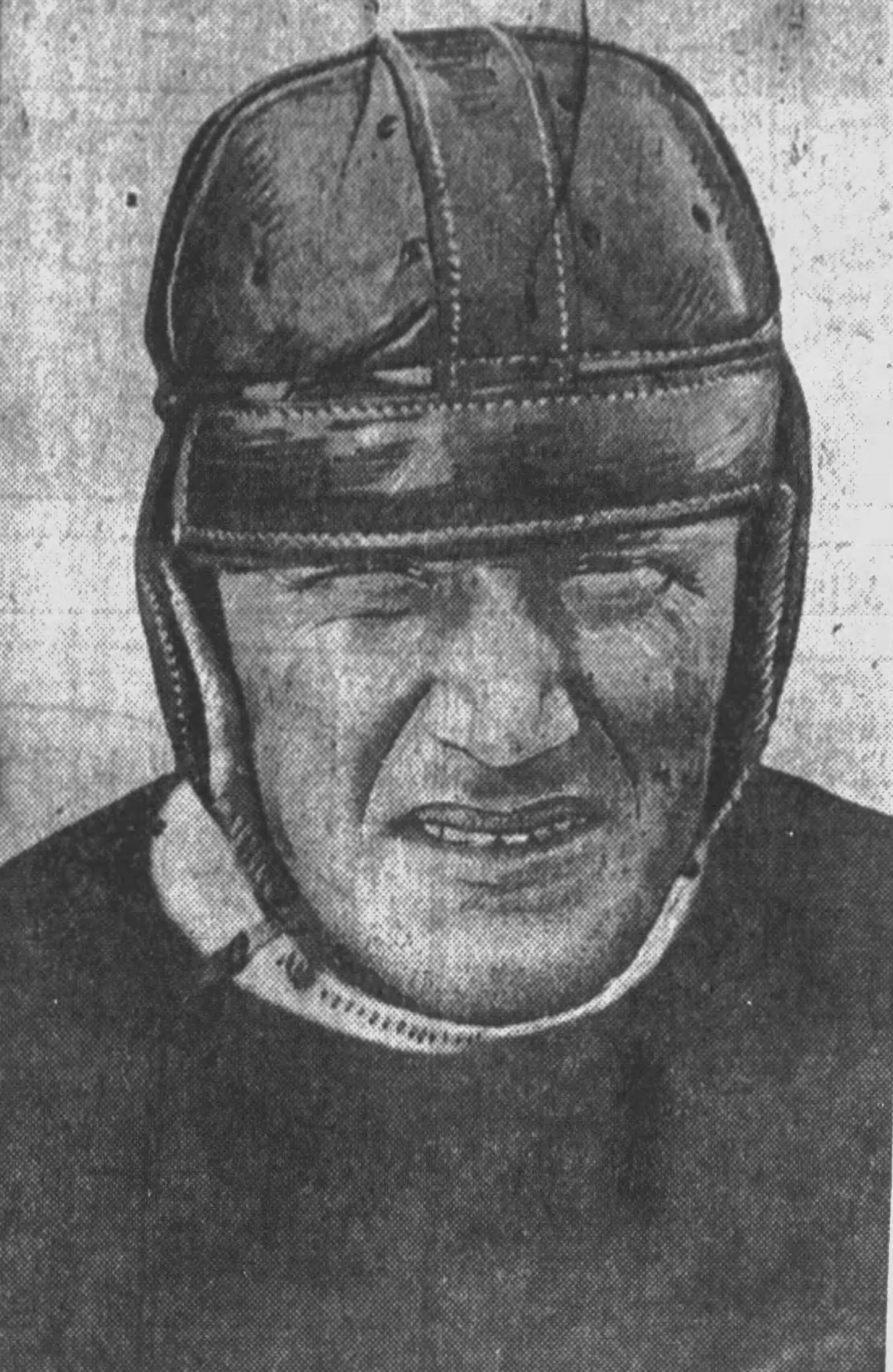
Frank Mottey

- Wally Kamian, end
- Jimmy Kennedy, left halfback, 180 pounds, 5'10", 22 years old, Exeter
- Walter Matthews, right halfback, 170 pounds, 5'8", 21 years old, Lewiston, Maine
- L. McRady, left tackle, 200 pounds, 6'3", 19 years old, Sapulpa
- Frank Mottey, left guard, 205 pounds, 6'1", 18 years old, Loretta, Pennsylvania
- Con O'Brien, right tackle, 205 pounds, 6'3", 22 years old, Boston
- Ted Plumridge, center, 205 pounds, 6'2", 22 years old, Marquand
- Leo Prendergast, right end, 195 pounds, 5'9-1/2", 22 years old, Kiski
- Dewey Price, left end, 175 pounds, 5'7-1/2", 21 years old, Sapulpa
- Rex Thomas, quarterback, 170 pounds, 5'11", 21 years old, Sapulpa
- Russ Warren, right guard, 190 pounds, 5'11", 21 years old, Manual
- Phil Weiss, fullback, 180 pounds, 5'11", 20 years old, Fordham Prep
