= Ray Lynch (American football) =

American football coach (1894–1965)

Biographical details
- Born: January 29, 1894; South Hadley Falls, Massachusetts, U.S.
- Died: April 11, 1965 (aged 71); Queens Village, New York, U.S.
- Education: St. John's College School of Law

Playing career

Football
- 1914–1917: Holy Cross
- 1918: Newport Naval Reserves
- Position: Guard

Coaching career (HC unless noted)

Football
- 1922: St. John's Prep. (NY)
- 1923–1931: St. John's
- 1935–1936: Bay Parkway Football Club
- 1937–1939: Brooklyn Eagles

Administrative career (AD unless noted)
- 1923–1931: St. John's

Head coaching record
- Overall: 28–37–6 (College football)

Raymond Francis Lynch (January 29, 1894 – April 11, 1965) was an American football player and coach who played for the College of the Holy Cross and was head coach of the St. John's Red Storm football team from 1923 to 1931.

== Playing ==
Lynch was born on January 29, 1894, in South Hadley Falls, Massachusetts. He graduated from South Hadley High School in 1912 and the Cushing Academy in 1914 and played football at both schools.

Lynch played guard for the Holy Cross Crusaders and was captain of the team in 1916 and 1917. He graduated from Holy Cross in 1918. He then enlisted in the United States Navy Reserve on June 14, 1918, and served his entire enlistment at Naval Station Newport, where he was a captain of the Newport Naval Reserves football team. He was a Walter Camp's all-service third-team selection. He was honorably discharged on December 27, 1918. He was inducted into the Holy Cross Varsity Club Hall of Fame in 1961.

== Coaching ==
St. John's College Football Team 1929

Lynch began his coaching career at St. John's Preparatory School in Queens. In 1923, he became head football coach and athletic director at St. John's College. He was also a professor of English and political science and attended the St. John's School of Law.

Lynch re-established a football program that had been dormant for sixteen years and in his first season, St. John's went undefeated and outscored their opponents 111 points to 32. His only other winning season came in 1930, when the Redmen, led by Bob Sheppard, went 7–1. Following the 1931 season, the school dropped football for financial reasons. Lynch stepped down as athletic director on December 31, 1931, but remained with St. John's as a pre-law instructor. His overall record at St. John's was 28–37–6.

In 1933 and 1934, Lynch was an official for the National Football League. From 1935 to 1939, he was head coach of the Bay Parkway Football Club/Brooklyn Eagles, a minor league football team.

== Later life ==
During World War II, Lynch was personnel director of the USO overseas department. After the war, he was associated with law firm of Fanning & Fanning. On April 11, 1965, Lynch suffered a fatal heart attack while driving.

== Head coaching record ==
=== College ===
Year	Team	Overall	Conference	Standing	Bowl/playoffs
St. John's Red and White / Redmen (Independent) (1923–1931)
1923	St. John's	5–0–1			
1924	St. John's	3–3			
1925	St. John's	3–4			
1926	St. John's	1–5–1			
1927	St. John's	1–7–1			
1928	St. John's	2–5–2			
1929	St. John's	3–7			
1930	St. John's	7–1			
1931	St. John's	3–5–1			
St. John's:		28–37–6			
Total:		28–37–6			
