= Jim Leonard (American football, born 1899) =

American football player (1899–1979)

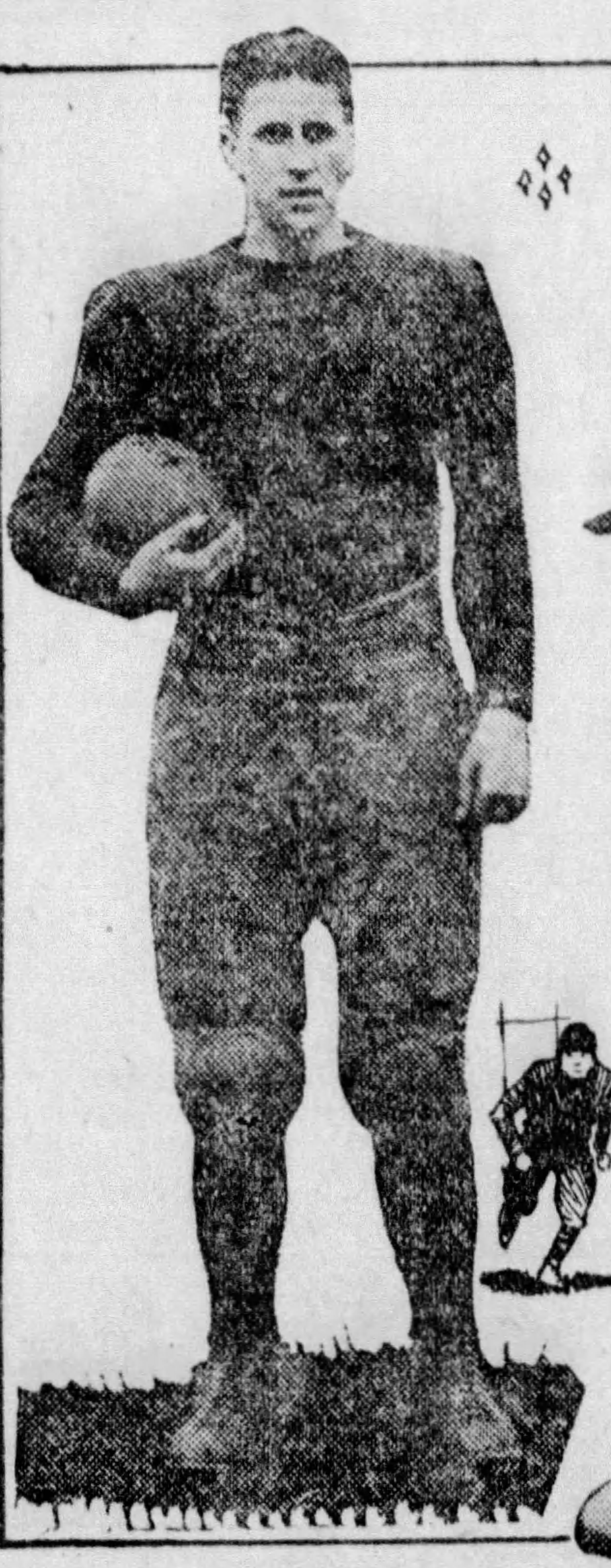
- Jim Leonard in 1923

Profile
- Position: Tackle

Personal information
- Born: January 2, 1899; Geneseo, New York
- Died: February 2, 1979 (aged 80); Salamanca, New York
- Listed height: 6 ft 0 in (1.83 m)
- Listed weight: 205 lb (93 kg)

Career information
- High school: Geneseo (NY)
- College: Geneseo St., Colgate

Career history
- Rochester Jeffersons (1923)

Career statistics
- Games: 3

James Michael Leonard (January 2, 1899 – February 2, 1979) was an American football player.

Leonard was born in 1899 in Geneseo, New York, and attended Geneseo High School. He served in the military during World War I. He began his collegiate career at Gennessee Normal School where he started in both football and baseball. He then enrolled at Colgate University and played college football at the tackle position for Colgate from 1920 to 1923. He was a regular at the tackle position for Colgate in 1921 and 1922 and was then elected as captain of the 1923 Colgate football team that compiled a 6–2–1 record. He also played on Colgate's basketball and baseball teams.

Late in the 1923 season, Leonard joined the Rochester Jeffersons of the National Football League (NFL). He appeared in three NFL games at tackle for the Jeffersons.

In 1927, Leonard was hired as coach of the Greyhound Football Club.

Leonard died in 1979 in Naples, Florida.
