= 1923 Yale Bulldogs football team =

American college football season

1923 Yale Bulldogs football
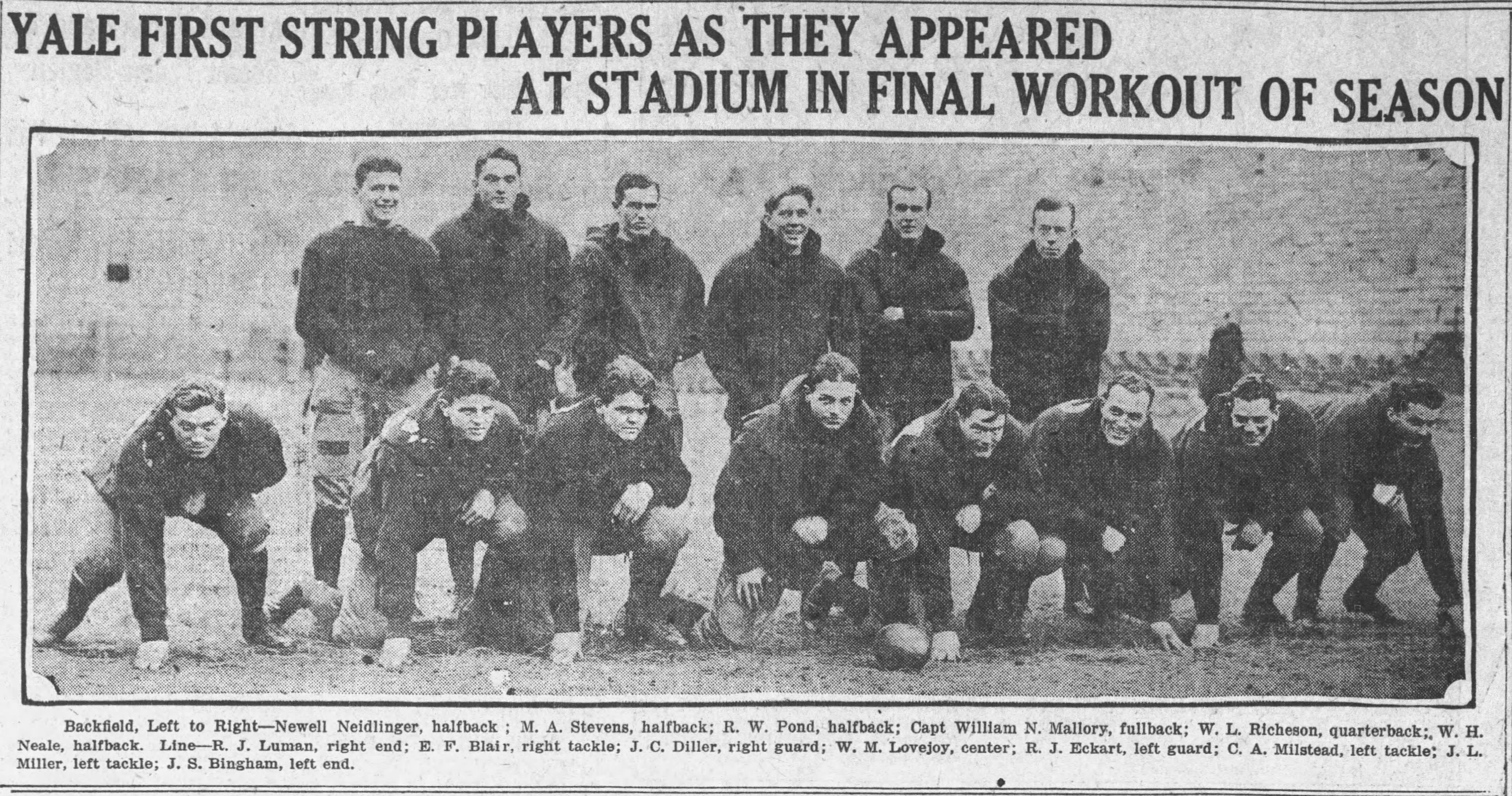

Co-national champion (QPRS)
- Conference: Independent
- Head coach: Tad Jones (6th season)
- Offensive scheme: Single-wing
- Captain: Bill Mallory
- Home stadium: Yale Bowl

Uniform
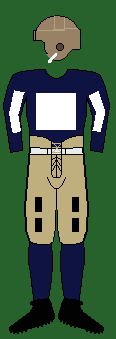

1923 Eastern college football independents records
	Conf.			Overall
Team	W	L	T	W		L		T
Cornell		–		8	–	0	–	0
Yale		–		8	–	0	–	0
St. John's		–		5	–	0	–	1
Dartmouth		–		8	–	1	–	0
Syracuse		–		8	–	1	–	0
Boston College		–		7	–	1	–	1
Rutgers		–		7	–	1	–	1
Washington & Jefferson		–		6	–	1	–	1
Holy Cross		–		8	–	2	–	0
Lafayette		–		6	–	1	–	2
Tufts		–		6	–	2	–	0
Army		–		6	–	2	–	1
Colgate		–		6	–	2	–	1
Geneva		–		6	–	2	–	1
Lehigh		–		6	–	2	–	1
NYU		–		6	–	2	–	1
Penn State		–		6	–	2	–	1
Vermont		–		6	–	3	–	1
Brown		–		6	–	4	–	0
Harvard		–		4	–	3	–	1
Carnegie Tech		–		4	–	3	–	1
Penn		–		5	–	4	–	0
Pittsburgh		–		5	–	4	–	0
Bucknell		–		4	–	4	–	1
Columbia		–		4	–	4	–	1
Duquesne		–		4	–	4	–	0
Princeton		–		3	–	3	–	1
Franklin & Marshall		–		3	–	5	–	1
Drexel		–		2	–	6	–	0
Buffalo		–		2	–	5	–	1
Fordham		–		2	–	7	–	0
Boston University		–		1	–	6	–	0
Villanova		–		0	–	7	–	1
Temple		–		0	–	5	–	0
CCNY		–		0	–	7	–	0
Springfield		–		0	–	7	–	0

The 1923 Yale Bulldogs football team represented Yale University in the 1923 college football season. The Bulldogs finished with an undefeated 8–0 record under sixth-year head coach Tad Jones. Yale outscored its opponents by a combined score of 230 to 38, including a 40–0 victory over Georgia, a 31–10 victory over Army and shutout victories over rivals Princeton and Harvard. Two Yale players, tackle Century Milstead and fullback Bill Mallory, were consensus selections for the 1923 College Football All-America Team. The team was selected retroactively as a co-national champion by the Berryman QPRS system.

== Schedule ==
Date	Time	Opponent	Site	Result	Attendance	Source
October 6		North Carolina	Yale Bowl; New Haven, CT	W 53–0	20,000	
October 13		Georgia	Yale Bowl; New Haven, CT	W 40–0		
October 20		Bucknell	Yale Bowl; New Haven, CT	W 29–14		
October 27	2:30 p.m.	Brown	Yale Bowl; New Haven, CT	W 21–0	45,000	
November 3		Army	Yale Bowl; New Haven, CT	W 31–10		
November 10		Maryland	Yale Bowl; New Haven, CT	W 16–14	20,000	
November 17		Princeton	Yale Bowl; New Haven, CT (rivalry)	W 27–0	80,000	
November 24		at Harvard	Harvard Stadium; Boston, MA (rivalry)	W 13–0		
All times are in Eastern time

== Roster ==
- Edward C. Bench
- John S. Bingham, E
- Edwin F. Blair, T
- James F. Burns
- Benjamin Butterworth, T
- Edmund P. Cottle, HB
- Joshua M. Deaver, E
- John C. Diller, T
- Richard J. Eckhart
- Caldwell B. Esselstyn, G
- Edward M. Greene
- J. Hoxie Haas, FB
- Theodore S. Hart
- Otis L. Hubbard
- Tony Hulman, E
- Houston E. Landis, C
- John J. Lincoln
- Winslow Lovejoy, C
- Richard Luman, E
- Bill Mallory, FB
- John L. Miller, T
- Century Milstead, T
- Russell W. Murphy, QB
- William H. Neale, HB
- Newell G. Neidlinger
- Norris, G
- Charles M. O'Hearn, HB
- Philip W. Pillsbury
- Ducky Pond, HB
- William L. Richeson, QB
- Riley, QB
- Henry C. Scott
- Mal Stevens, HB
- Weinecke, QB
