= 1923 Harvard Crimson football team =

American college football season

1923 Harvard Crimson football
- Conference: Independent
- Record: 4–3–1
- Head coach: Bob Fisher (5th season)
- Captain: Charles Hubbard
- Home stadium: Harvard Stadium

1923 Eastern college football independents records
	Conf.			Overall
Team	W	L	T	W		L		T
Cornell		–		8	–	0	–	0
Yale		–		8	–	0	–	0
St. John's		–		5	–	0	–	1
Dartmouth		–		8	–	1	–	0
Syracuse		–		8	–	1	–	0
Boston College		–		7	–	1	–	1
Rutgers		–		7	–	1	–	1
Washington & Jefferson		–		6	–	1	–	1
Holy Cross		–		8	–	2	–	0
Lafayette		–		6	–	1	–	2
Tufts		–		6	–	2	–	0
Army		–		6	–	2	–	1
Colgate		–		6	–	2	–	1
Geneva		–		6	–	2	–	1
Lehigh		–		6	–	2	–	1
NYU		–		6	–	2	–	1
Penn State		–		6	–	2	–	1
Vermont		–		6	–	3	–	1
Brown		–		6	–	4	–	0
Harvard		–		4	–	3	–	1
Carnegie Tech		–		4	–	3	–	1
Penn		–		5	–	4	–	0
Pittsburgh		–		5	–	4	–	0
Bucknell		–		4	–	4	–	1
Columbia		–		4	–	4	–	1
Duquesne		–		4	–	4	–	0
Princeton		–		3	–	3	–	1
Franklin & Marshall		–		3	–	5	–	1
Drexel		–		2	–	6	–	0
Buffalo		–		2	–	5	–	1
Fordham		–		2	–	7	–	0
Boston University		–		1	–	6	–	0
Villanova		–		0	–	7	–	1
Temple		–		0	–	5	–	0
CCNY		–		0	–	7	–	0
Springfield		–		0	–	7	–	0

The 1923 Harvard Crimson football team represented Harvard University in the 1923 college football season. In its fifth season under head coach Bob Fisher, Harvard compiled a 4–3–1 record and outscored opponents by a total of 75 to 55. Charles Hubbard was the team captain. The team played its home games at Harvard Stadium in Boston.

== Schedule ==
Date	Time	Opponent	Site	Result	Attendance	Source
October 6		Rhode Island State	Harvard Stadium; Boston, MA	W 35–0		
October 13		Middlebury	Harvard Stadium; Boston, MA	T 6–6		
October 20		Holy Cross	Harvard Stadium; Boston, MA	W 6–0		
October 27		Dartmouth	Harvard Stadium; Boston, MA (rivalry)	L 0–16	52,000	
November 3		Tufts	Harvard Stadium; Boston, MA	W 16–0		
November 10		at Princeton	Princeton, NJ (rivalry)	W 5–0	55,000–56,000	
November 17	2:00 p.m.	Brown	Harvard Stadium; Boston, MA	L 7–20		
November 24		Yale	Yale Bowl; New Haven, CT (rivalry)	L 0–13		
All times are in Eastern time
