= 1923 Bucknell Bison football team =

American college football season

1923 Bucknell Bison football
- Conference: Independent
- Record: 4–4–1
- Head coach: Pete Reynolds (5th season)
- Home stadium: Tustin Field

1923 Eastern college football independents records
	Conf.			Overall
Team	W	L	T	W		L		T
Cornell		–		8	–	0	–	0
Yale		–		8	–	0	–	0
St. John's		–		5	–	0	–	1
Dartmouth		–		8	–	1	–	0
Syracuse		–		8	–	1	–	0
Boston College		–		7	–	1	–	1
Rutgers		–		7	–	1	–	1
Washington & Jefferson		–		6	–	1	–	1
Holy Cross		–		8	–	2	–	0
Lafayette		–		6	–	1	–	2
Tufts		–		6	–	2	–	0
Army		–		6	–	2	–	1
Colgate		–		6	–	2	–	1
Geneva		–		6	–	2	–	1
Lehigh		–		6	–	2	–	1
NYU		–		6	–	2	–	1
Penn State		–		6	–	2	–	1
Vermont		–		6	–	3	–	1
Brown		–		6	–	4	–	0
Harvard		–		4	–	3	–	1
Carnegie Tech		–		4	–	3	–	1
Penn		–		5	–	4	–	0
Pittsburgh		–		5	–	4	–	0
Bucknell		–		4	–	4	–	1
Columbia		–		4	–	4	–	1
Duquesne		–		4	–	4	–	0
Princeton		–		3	–	3	–	1
Franklin & Marshall		–		3	–	5	–	1
Drexel		–		2	–	6	–	0
Buffalo		–		2	–	5	–	1
Fordham		–		2	–	7	–	0
Boston University		–		1	–	6	–	0
Villanova		–		0	–	7	–	1
Temple		–		0	–	5	–	0
CCNY		–		0	–	7	–	0
Springfield		–		0	–	7	–	0

The 1923 Bucknell Bison football team was an American football team that represented Bucknell University as an independent during the 1923 college football season. In its fifth and final season under head coach Pete Reynolds, the team compiled a 4–4–1 record.

The team played its home games at Tustin Field in Lewisburg, Pennsylvania.

== Schedule ==
Date	Opponent	Site	Result	Attendance	Source
September 29	Pittsburgh	Tustin Field; Lewisburg, PA	L 0–21	10,000	
October 6	Alfred	Tustin Field; Lewisburg, PA	W 47–0		
October 13	Susquehanna	Tustin Field; Lewisburg, PA	W 47–0		
October 20	at Yale	Yale Bowl; New Haven, CT	L 14–29		
November 3	at Muhlenberg	Allentown, PA	W 14–6		
November 10	Lehigh^{†}	Tustin Field; Lewisburg, PA	T 7–7		
November 17	at Georgetown	Griffith Stadium; Washington, DC	W 14–7		
November 24	Allegheny	Tustin Field; Lewisburg, PA	L 7–10		
November 29	at Dickinson	Biddle Field; Carlisle, PA	L 10–14	5,000	
^{†}Homecoming
