= 1923 CCNY Lavender football team =

American college football season

1923 CCNY Lavender football
- Conference: Independent
- Record: 0–7
- Home stadium: Lewisohn Stadium

1923 Eastern college football independents records
	Conf.			Overall
Team	W	L	T	W		L		T
Cornell		–		8	–	0	–	0
Yale		–		8	–	0	–	0
St. John's		–		5	–	0	–	1
Dartmouth		–		8	–	1	–	0
Syracuse		–		8	–	1	–	0
Boston College		–		7	–	1	–	1
Rutgers		–		7	–	1	–	1
Washington & Jefferson		–		6	–	1	–	1
Holy Cross		–		8	–	2	–	0
Lafayette		–		6	–	1	–	2
Tufts		–		6	–	2	–	0
Army		–		6	–	2	–	1
Colgate		–		6	–	2	–	1
Geneva		–		6	–	2	–	1
Lehigh		–		6	–	2	–	1
NYU		–		6	–	2	–	1
Penn State		–		6	–	2	–	1
Vermont		–		6	–	3	–	1
Brown		–		6	–	4	–	0
Harvard		–		4	–	3	–	1
Carnegie Tech		–		4	–	3	–	1
Penn		–		5	–	4	–	0
Pittsburgh		–		5	–	4	–	0
Bucknell		–		4	–	4	–	1
Columbia		–		4	–	4	–	1
Duquesne		–		4	–	4	–	0
Princeton		–		3	–	3	–	1
Franklin & Marshall		–		3	–	5	–	1
Drexel		–		2	–	6	–	0
Buffalo		–		2	–	5	–	1
Fordham		–		2	–	7	–	0
Boston University		–		1	–	6	–	0
Villanova		–		0	–	7	–	1
Temple		–		0	–	5	–	0
CCNY		–		0	–	7	–	0
Springfield		–		0	–	7	–	0

The 1923 CCNY Lavender football team was an American football team that represented the City College of New York (CCNY) as an independent during the 1923 college football season. The Lavender team compiled an 0–7 record for the season.

== Schedule ==
Date	Opponent	Site	Result	Source
October 6	Drexel	Lewisohn Stadium; New York, NY	L 0–18	
October 13	St. Stephen's	Lewisohn Stadium; New York, NY	L 0–7	
October 20	Delaware	Lewisohn Stadium; New York, NY	L 0–18	
October 27	Hobart	Lewisohn Stadium; New York, NY	L 0–7	
November 3	at Connecticut	Gardner Dow Athletic Fields; Storrs, CT	L 0–19	
November 10	NYU	Lewisohn Stadium; New York, NY	L 0–26	
November 17	at Fordham	Fordham Field; Bronx, NY	L 0–30	
