= 1923 Army Cadets football team =

American college football season

1923 Army Cadets football
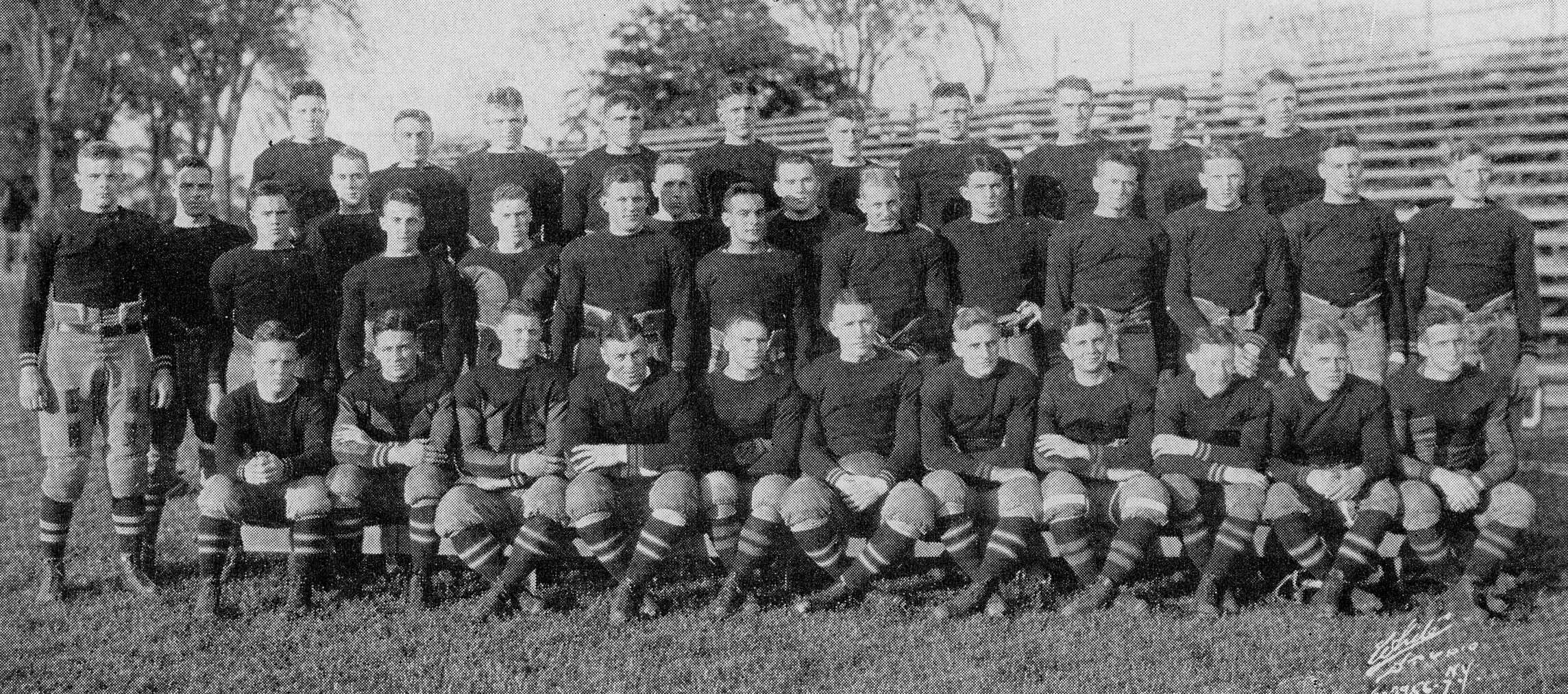
- Conference: Independent
- Record: 6–2–1
- Head coach: John McEwan (1st season)
- Captain: Denis Mulligan
- Home stadium: The Plain

Uniform
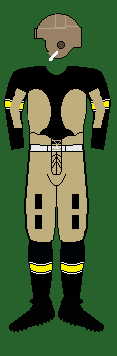

1923 Eastern college football independents records
	Conf.			Overall
Team	W	L	T	W		L		T
Cornell		–		8	–	0	–	0
Yale		–		8	–	0	–	0
St. John's		–		5	–	0	–	1
Dartmouth		–		8	–	1	–	0
Syracuse		–		8	–	1	–	0
Boston College		–		7	–	1	–	1
Rutgers		–		7	–	1	–	1
Washington & Jefferson		–		6	–	1	–	1
Holy Cross		–		8	–	2	–	0
Lafayette		–		6	–	1	–	2
Tufts		–		6	–	2	–	0
Army		–		6	–	2	–	1
Colgate		–		6	–	2	–	1
Geneva		–		6	–	2	–	1
Lehigh		–		6	–	2	–	1
NYU		–		6	–	2	–	1
Penn State		–		6	–	2	–	1
Vermont		–		6	–	3	–	1
Brown		–		6	–	4	–	0
Harvard		–		4	–	3	–	1
Carnegie Tech		–		4	–	3	–	1
Penn		–		5	–	4	–	0
Pittsburgh		–		5	–	4	–	0
Bucknell		–		4	–	4	–	1
Columbia		–		4	–	4	–	1
Duquesne		–		4	–	4	–	0
Princeton		–		3	–	3	–	1
Franklin & Marshall		–		3	–	5	–	1
Drexel		–		2	–	6	–	0
Buffalo		–		2	–	5	–	1
Fordham		–		2	–	7	–	0
Boston University		–		1	–	6	–	0
Villanova		–		0	–	7	–	1
Temple		–		0	–	5	–	0
CCNY		–		0	–	7	–	0
Springfield		–		0	–	7	–	0

The 1923 Army Cadets football team represented the United States Military Academy as an independent during the 1923 college football season. In their first season under head coach John McEwan, the Cadets compiled a 6–2–1 record, shut out five of their nine opponents, and outscored all opponents by a combined total of 237 to 56. In the annual Army–Navy Game, the Cadets and Midshipmen played to a scoreless tie at the Polo Grounds in New York City.

Two Army players were recognized on the All-America team. Center Edgar Garbisch was selected as a first-team player by Tom Thorp and Percy Haughton and a second-team player by Athletic World magazine, Norman E. Brown and Davis Walsh. Garbisch was later inducted into the College Football Hall of Fame. Guard August Farwick received second-team honors from Norman E. Brown and Tom Thorp.

== Schedule ==
Date	Opponent	Site	Result	Attendance	Source
September 29	Tennessee	The Plain; West Point, NY	W 41–0		
October 6	Florida	The Plain; West Point, NY	W 20–0		
October 13	vs. Notre Dame	Ebbets Field; Brooklyn, NY (rivalry)	L 0–13	35,000	
October 20	Auburn	The Plain; West Point, NY	W 28–6		
October 27	Lebanon Valley	The Plain; West Point, NY	W 74–0		
November 3	at Yale	Yale Bowl; New Haven, CT	L 10–31		
November 10	Arkansas Tech	The Plain; West Point, NY	W 44–0		
November 17	Bethany (WV)	The Plain; West Point, NY	W 20–6		
November 24	vs. Navy	Polo Grounds; New York, NY (Army–Navy Game)	T 0–0	66,000	
