= 1923 Dartmouth Indians football team =

American college football season

1923 Dartmouth Indians football
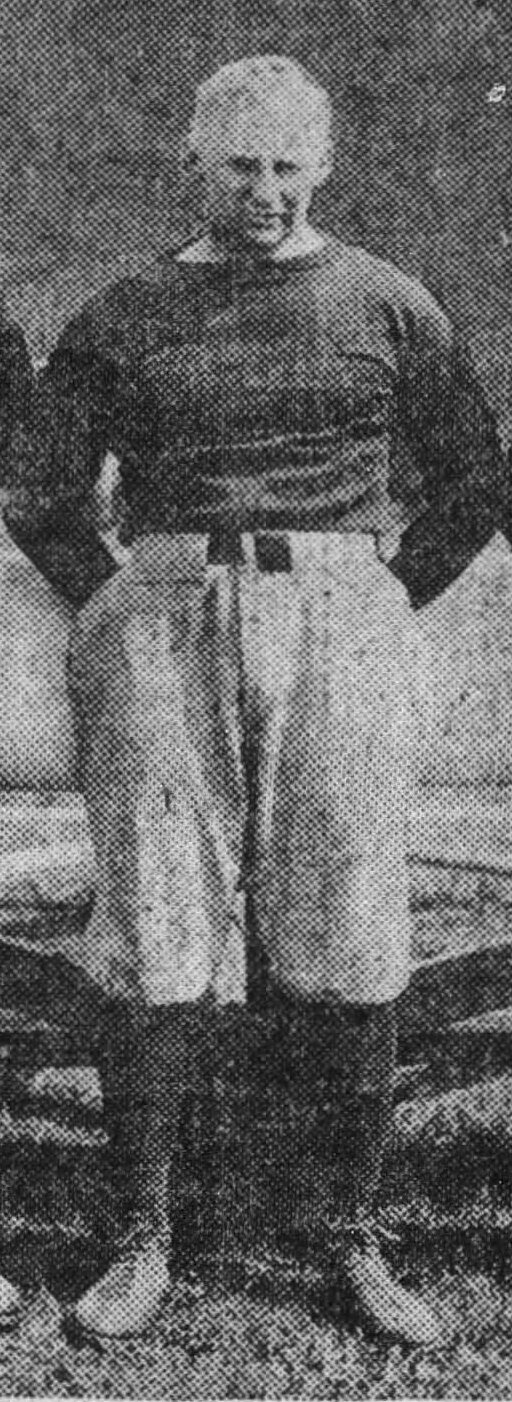
- Conference: Independent
- Record: 8–1
- Head coach: Jesse Hawley (1st season)
- Captain: Cyril J. Aschenbach
- Home stadium: Memorial Field

1923 Eastern college football independents records
	Conf.			Overall
Team	W	L	T	W		L		T
Cornell		–		8	–	0	–	0
Yale		–		8	–	0	–	0
St. John's		–		5	–	0	–	1
Dartmouth		–		8	–	1	–	0
Syracuse		–		8	–	1	–	0
Boston College		–		7	–	1	–	1
Rutgers		–		7	–	1	–	1
Washington & Jefferson		–		6	–	1	–	1
Holy Cross		–		8	–	2	–	0
Lafayette		–		6	–	1	–	2
Tufts		–		6	–	2	–	0
Army		–		6	–	2	–	1
Colgate		–		6	–	2	–	1
Geneva		–		6	–	2	–	1
Lehigh		–		6	–	2	–	1
NYU		–		6	–	2	–	1
Penn State		–		6	–	2	–	1
Vermont		–		6	–	3	–	1
Brown		–		6	–	4	–	0
Harvard		–		4	–	3	–	1
Carnegie Tech		–		4	–	3	–	1
Penn		–		5	–	4	–	0
Pittsburgh		–		5	–	4	–	0
Bucknell		–		4	–	4	–	1
Columbia		–		4	–	4	–	1
Duquesne		–		4	–	4	–	0
Princeton		–		3	–	3	–	1
Franklin & Marshall		–		3	–	5	–	1
Drexel		–		2	–	6	–	0
Buffalo		–		2	–	5	–	1
Fordham		–		2	–	7	–	0
Boston University		–		1	–	6	–	0
Villanova		–		0	–	7	–	1
Temple		–		0	–	5	–	0
CCNY		–		0	–	7	–	0
Springfield		–		0	–	7	–	0

The 1923 Dartmouth Indians football team was an American football team that represented Dartmouth College as an independent during the 1923 college football season. In their first season under head coach Jesse Hawley, the Indians compiled an 8–1 record, shut out five of nine opponents, and outscored all opponents by a total of 202 to 54.

In November 1923, Dartmouth began a 22-game unbeaten streak that continued until October 1926.

Cyril J. Aschenbach was the team captain. H. Lester Haws was the team's leading scorer with 60 points scored on 10 touchdowns. Ed B. Dooley and R. B. Hall followed with 24 points each.

== Schedule ==
Date	Time	Opponent	Site	Result	Attendance	Source
September 29		Norwich	Memorial Field; Hanover, NH	W 13–0		
October 6		Maine	Memorial Field; Hanover, NH	W 6–0		
October 13		Boston University	Memorial Field; Hanover, NH	W 24–0		
October 20		at Vermont	Centennial Field; Burlington, VT	W 27–2		
October 27		at Harvard	Harvard Stadium; Boston, MA	W 16–0	52,000	
November 3		Cornell	Memorial Field; Hanover, NH	L 7–32	> 15,000	
November 10	2:00 p.m.	vs. Brown	Fenway Park; Boston, MA	W 16–14	25,000	
November 17		Colby	Memorial Field; Hanover, NH	W 62–0		
November 29		at Columbia	Polo Grounds; New York, NY	W 31–6	30,000	
All times are in Eastern time
