= 1923 Drexel Dragons football team =

American college football season

1923 Drexel Dragons football
- Conference: Independent
- Record: 2–6
- Head coach: Harry J. O'Brien (2nd season)

1923 Eastern college football independents records
| | Conf. | | | Overall |
| Team | W | L | T | W | | L | | T |
|---|---|---|---|---|---|---|---|---|
| Cornell | | – | | 8 | – | 0 | – | 0 |
| Yale | | – | | 8 | – | 0 | – | 0 |
| St. John's | | – | | 5 | – | 0 | – | 1 |
| Dartmouth | | – | | 8 | – | 1 | – | 0 |
| Syracuse | | – | | 8 | – | 1 | – | 0 |
| Boston College | | – | | 7 | – | 1 | – | 1 |
| Rutgers | | – | | 7 | – | 1 | – | 1 |
| Washington & Jefferson | | – | | 6 | – | 1 | – | 1 |
| Holy Cross | | – | | 8 | – | 2 | – | 0 |
| Lafayette | | – | | 6 | – | 1 | – | 2 |
| Tufts | | – | | 6 | – | 2 | – | 0 |
| Army | | – | | 6 | – | 2 | – | 1 |
| Colgate | | – | | 6 | – | 2 | – | 1 |
| Geneva | | – | | 6 | – | 2 | – | 1 |
| Lehigh | | – | | 6 | – | 2 | – | 1 |
| NYU | | – | | 6 | – | 2 | – | 1 |
| Penn State | | – | | 6 | – | 2 | – | 1 |
| Vermont | | – | | 6 | – | 3 | – | 1 |
| Brown | | – | | 6 | – | 4 | – | 0 |
| Harvard | | – | | 4 | – | 3 | – | 1 |
| Carnegie Tech | | – | | 4 | – | 3 | – | 1 |
| Penn | | – | | 5 | – | 4 | – | 0 |
| Pittsburgh | | – | | 5 | – | 4 | – | 0 |
| Bucknell | | – | | 4 | – | 4 | – | 1 |
| Columbia | | – | | 4 | – | 4 | – | 1 |
| Duquesne | | – | | 4 | – | 4 | – | 0 |
| Princeton | | – | | 3 | – | 3 | – | 1 |
| Franklin & Marshall | | – | | 3 | – | 5 | – | 1 |
| Drexel | | – | | 2 | – | 6 | – | 0 |
| Buffalo | | – | | 2 | – | 5 | – | 1 |
| Fordham | | – | | 2 | – | 7 | – | 0 |
| Boston University | | – | | 1 | – | 6 | – | 0 |
| Villanova | | – | | 0 | – | 7 | – | 1 |
| Temple | | – | | 0 | – | 5 | – | 0 |
| CCNY | | – | | 0 | – | 7 | – | 0 |
| Springfield | | – | | 0 | – | 7 | – | 0 |

The 1923 Drexel Dragons football team represented Drexel Institute—now known as Drexel University—in the 1923 college football season. Led by Harry J. O'Brien in his second season as head coach, the team compiled a record of 2–6.

== Schedule ==
| Date | Time | Opponent | Site | Result | Source |
|---|---|---|---|---|---|
| October 6 | 2:30 pm | at CCNY | Lewisohn Stadium; New York, NY | W 18–0 | |
| October 13 | | at Saint Joseph's | Phillies Park; Philadelphia, PA | L 0–6 | |
| October 20 | 2:30 pm | at George Washington | Wilson Memorial Stadium; Washington, DC | L 0–8 | |
| October 27 | | Juniata | Philadelphia, PA | L 7–14 | |
| November 3 | | at St. Stephen's (NY) | Red Sox Park; Poughkeepsie, NY | L 0–37 | |
| November 10 | | Gallaudet | Philadelphia, PA | L 0–13 | |
| November 17 | | Temple | Philadelphia, PA | W 7–0 | |
| November 24 | | Western Maryland | Philadelphia, PA | L 0–14 | |
All times are in Eastern time

== Roster ==
1923 Drexel Dragons football team roster
| Players | | | Coaches |
|---|---|---|---|
| Offense: Pos. / # / Name / Class | Defense: Pos. / # / Name / Class | Special teams: Pos. / # / Name / Class | Head coach: Harry J. O'Brien (Swarthmore); Coordinators/assistant coaches Legend: (C) Team captain; (S) Suspended; (I) Ineligible; Injured; Redshirt |
