= 1923 Penn Quakers football team =

American college football season

1923 Penn Quakers football
- Conference: Independent
- Record: 5–4
- Head coach: Lou Young (1st season)
- Captain: Tex Hamer
- Home stadium: Franklin Field

1923 Eastern college football independents records
	Conf.			Overall
Team	W	L	T	W		L		T
Cornell		–		8	–	0	–	0
Yale		–		8	–	0	–	0
St. John's		–		5	–	0	–	1
Dartmouth		–		8	–	1	–	0
Syracuse		–		8	–	1	–	0
Boston College		–		7	–	1	–	1
Rutgers		–		7	–	1	–	1
Washington & Jefferson		–		6	–	1	–	1
Holy Cross		–		8	–	2	–	0
Lafayette		–		6	–	1	–	2
Tufts		–		6	–	2	–	0
Army		–		6	–	2	–	1
Colgate		–		6	–	2	–	1
Geneva		–		6	–	2	–	1
Lehigh		–		6	–	2	–	1
NYU		–		6	–	2	–	1
Penn State		–		6	–	2	–	1
Vermont		–		6	–	3	–	1
Brown		–		6	–	4	–	0
Harvard		–		4	–	3	–	1
Carnegie Tech		–		4	–	3	–	1
Penn		–		5	–	4	–	0
Pittsburgh		–		5	–	4	–	0
Bucknell		–		4	–	4	–	1
Columbia		–		4	–	4	–	1
Duquesne		–		4	–	4	–	0
Princeton		–		3	–	3	–	1
Franklin & Marshall		–		3	–	5	–	1
Drexel		–		2	–	6	–	0
Buffalo		–		2	–	5	–	1
Fordham		–		2	–	7	–	0
Boston University		–		1	–	6	–	0
Villanova		–		0	–	7	–	1
Temple		–		0	–	5	–	0
CCNY		–		0	–	7	–	0
Springfield		–		0	–	7	–	0

The 1923 Penn Quakers football team was an American football team that represented the University of Pennsylvania as an independent during the 1923 college football season. In their first season under head coach Lou Young, the Quakers compiled a 5–4 record and outscored all opponents by a total of 95 to 63. The team played its home games at Franklin Field in Philadelphia.

== Schedule ==
Date	Opponent	Site	Result	Attendance	Source
September 29	Franklin & Marshall	Franklin Field; Philadelphia, PA	W 20–0		
October 6	Maryland	Franklin Field; Philadelphia, PA	L 0–3	40,000	
October 13	Swarthmore	Franklin Field; Philadelphia, PA	W 13–10		
October 20	Columbia	Franklin Field; Philadelphia, PA	W 19–7	30,000	
October 27	Centre	Franklin Field; Philadelphia, PA	W 24–0	40,000	
November 3	Pittsburgh	Franklin Field; Philadelphia, PA	W 6–0	46,000	
November 10	Lafayette	Franklin Field; Philadelphia, PA	L 6–8		
November 17	Penn State	Franklin Field; Philadelphia, PA	L 0–21	56,000	
November 29	Cornell	Franklin Field; Philadelphia, PA (rivalry)	L 7–14	57,000	
