= 1923 Columbia Lions football team =

American college football season

1923 Columbia Lions football
- Conference: Independent
- Record: 4–4–1
- Head coach: Percy Haughton (1st season)
- Captain: Walter Koppisch
- Home stadium: Baker Field, Polo Grounds

1923 Eastern college football independents records
	Conf.			Overall
Team	W	L	T	W		L		T
Cornell		–		8	–	0	–	0
Yale		–		8	–	0	–	0
St. John's		–		5	–	0	–	1
Dartmouth		–		8	–	1	–	0
Syracuse		–		8	–	1	–	0
Boston College		–		7	–	1	–	1
Rutgers		–		7	–	1	–	1
Washington & Jefferson		–		6	–	1	–	1
Holy Cross		–		8	–	2	–	0
Lafayette		–		6	–	1	–	2
Tufts		–		6	–	2	–	0
Army		–		6	–	2	–	1
Colgate		–		6	–	2	–	1
Geneva		–		6	–	2	–	1
Lehigh		–		6	–	2	–	1
NYU		–		6	–	2	–	1
Penn State		–		6	–	2	–	1
Vermont		–		6	–	3	–	1
Brown		–		6	–	4	–	0
Harvard		–		4	–	3	–	1
Carnegie Tech		–		4	–	3	–	1
Penn		–		5	–	4	–	0
Pittsburgh		–		5	–	4	–	0
Bucknell		–		4	–	4	–	1
Columbia		–		4	–	4	–	1
Duquesne		–		4	–	4	–	0
Princeton		–		3	–	3	–	1
Franklin & Marshall		–		3	–	5	–	1
Drexel		–		2	–	6	–	0
Buffalo		–		2	–	5	–	1
Fordham		–		2	–	7	–	0
Boston University		–		1	–	6	–	0
Villanova		–		0	–	7	–	1
Temple		–		0	–	5	–	0
CCNY		–		0	–	7	–	0
Springfield		–		0	–	7	–	0

The 1923 Columbia Lions football team was an American football team that represented Columbia University as an independent during the 1923 college football season. In its first season under head coach Percy Haughton, the team compiled a 4–4–1 record and was outscored by a total of 107 to 68. The team played its home games at Baker Field and the Polo Grounds in Upper Manhattan.

== Schedule ==
Date	Opponent	Site	Result	Attendance	Source
September 29	Ursinus	Baker Field; New York, NY	W 13–0		
October 6	Amherst	Baker Field; New York, NY	T 0–0		
October 13	Wesleyan	Baker Field; New York, NY	W 12–6		
October 20	at Penn	Franklin Field; Philadelphia, PA	L 7–19	30,000	
October 27	Williams	Baker Field; New York, NY	L 0–10		
November 3	Middlebury	Baker Field; New York, NY	W 9–6		
November 10	Cornell	Polo Grounds; New York, NY (rivalry)	L 0–35	30,000	
November 17	NYU	Baker Field; New York, NY	W 21–0	20,000	
November 29	Dartmouth	Polo Grounds; New York, NY	L 6–31	30,000	
