= 1923 Villanova Wildcats football team =

American college football season

1923 Villanova Wildcats football
- Conference: Independent
- Record: 0–7–1
- Head coach: Hugh McGeehan (1st season)
- Captain: Frank Pickett

1923 Eastern college football independents records
	Conf.			Overall
Team	W	L	T	W		L		T
Cornell		–		8	–	0	–	0
Yale		–		8	–	0	–	0
St. John's		–		5	–	0	–	1
Dartmouth		–		8	–	1	–	0
Syracuse		–		8	–	1	–	0
Boston College		–		7	–	1	–	1
Rutgers		–		7	–	1	–	1
Washington & Jefferson		–		6	–	1	–	1
Holy Cross		–		8	–	2	–	0
Lafayette		–		6	–	1	–	2
Tufts		–		6	–	2	–	0
Army		–		6	–	2	–	1
Colgate		–		6	–	2	–	1
Geneva		–		6	–	2	–	1
Lehigh		–		6	–	2	–	1
NYU		–		6	–	2	–	1
Penn State		–		6	–	2	–	1
Vermont		–		6	–	3	–	1
Brown		–		6	–	4	–	0
Harvard		–		4	–	3	–	1
Carnegie Tech		–		4	–	3	–	1
Penn		–		5	–	4	–	0
Pittsburgh		–		5	–	4	–	0
Bucknell		–		4	–	4	–	1
Columbia		–		4	–	4	–	1
Duquesne		–		4	–	4	–	0
Princeton		–		3	–	3	–	1
Franklin & Marshall		–		3	–	5	–	1
Drexel		–		2	–	6	–	0
Buffalo		–		2	–	5	–	1
Fordham		–		2	–	7	–	0
Boston University		–		1	–	6	–	0
Villanova		–		0	–	7	–	1
Temple		–		0	–	5	–	0
CCNY		–		0	–	7	–	0
Springfield		–		0	–	7	–	0

The 1923 Villanova Wildcats football team represented the Villanova University during the 1923 college football season. The Wildcats team captain was Frank Pickett.

== Schedule ==
Date	Time	Opponent	Site	Result	Source
October 6		at Rutgers	Neilson Field; New Brunswick, NJ	L 0–44	
October 13	2:30 p.m.	at Lebanon Valley	Third and Green Sts; Lebanon, PA	L 0–3	
October 20		at Dickinson	Carlisle, PA	L 0–20	
October 27		at Gettysburg	York, PA	L 0–17	
November 3		at Quantico Marines	Quantico, VA	L 0–39	
		Third Army Corps	Villanova, PA	L 0–7	
November 17	2:00 p.m.	at Boston College	Braves Field; Boston, MA	L 0–41	
		at Muhlenberg	Allentown, PA	T 0–0	
