= 1923 Lehigh Brown and White football team =

American college football season

1923 Lehigh Brown and White football
- Conference: Independent
- Record: 6–2–1
- Head coach: James A. Baldwin (2nd season)
- Home stadium: Taylor Stadium

1923 Eastern college football independents records
	Conf.			Overall
Team	W	L	T	W		L		T
Cornell		–		8	–	0	–	0
Yale		–		8	–	0	–	0
St. John's		–		5	–	0	–	1
Dartmouth		–		8	–	1	–	0
Syracuse		–		8	–	1	–	0
Boston College		–		7	–	1	–	1
Rutgers		–		7	–	1	–	1
Washington & Jefferson		–		6	–	1	–	1
Holy Cross		–		8	–	2	–	0
Lafayette		–		6	–	1	–	2
Tufts		–		6	–	2	–	0
Army		–		6	–	2	–	1
Colgate		–		6	–	2	–	1
Geneva		–		6	–	2	–	1
Lehigh		–		6	–	2	–	1
NYU		–		6	–	2	–	1
Penn State		–		6	–	2	–	1
Vermont		–		6	–	3	–	1
Brown		–		6	–	4	–	0
Harvard		–		4	–	3	–	1
Carnegie Tech		–		4	–	3	–	1
Penn		–		5	–	4	–	0
Pittsburgh		–		5	–	4	–	0
Bucknell		–		4	–	4	–	1
Columbia		–		4	–	4	–	1
Duquesne		–		4	–	4	–	0
Princeton		–		3	–	3	–	1
Franklin & Marshall		–		3	–	5	–	1
Drexel		–		2	–	6	–	0
Buffalo		–		2	–	5	–	1
Fordham		–		2	–	7	–	0
Boston University		–		1	–	6	–	0
Villanova		–		0	–	7	–	1
Temple		–		0	–	5	–	0
CCNY		–		0	–	7	–	0
Springfield		–		0	–	7	–	0

The 1923 Lehigh Brown and White football team was an American football team that represented Lehigh University as an independent during the 1923 college football season. In its second season under head coach James A. Baldwin, the team compiled a 6–2–1 record and outscored opponents by a total of 107 to 57. Lehigh played home games at Taylor Stadium in Bethlehem, Pennsylvania.

== Schedule ==
Date	Opponent	Site	Result	Source
October 6	Gettysburg	Taylor Stadium; Bethlehem, PA	W 29–6	
October 13	at Rutgers	Neilson Field; New Brunswick, NJ	L 0–10	
October 20	Fordham	Taylor Stadium; Bethlehem, PA	W 9–6	
October 27	at Muhlenberg	Allentown, PA	W 13–3	
November 3	at Bucknell	Tustin Field; Lewisburg, PA	T 7–7	
November 10	Alfred	Taylor Stadium; Bethlehem, PA	W 21–0	
November 17	Carnegie Tech	Taylor Stadium; Bethlehem, PA	W 13–6	
November 24	Lafayette	Taylor Stadium; Bethlehem, PA (rivalry)	L 3–13	
November 29	at Brown	Andrews Field; Providence, RI	W 12–6	
