= 1923 Buffalo Bisons football team =

American college football season

1923 Buffalo Bisons football
- Conference: Independent
- Record: 2–5–1
- Head coach: James Bond (1st season)
- Home stadium: Rotary Field

1923 Eastern college football independents records
	Conf.			Overall
Team	W	L	T	W		L		T
Cornell		–		8	–	0	–	0
Yale		–		8	–	0	–	0
St. John's		–		5	–	0	–	1
Dartmouth		–		8	–	1	–	0
Syracuse		–		8	–	1	–	0
Boston College		–		7	–	1	–	1
Rutgers		–		7	–	1	–	1
Washington & Jefferson		–		6	–	1	–	1
Holy Cross		–		8	–	2	–	0
Lafayette		–		6	–	1	–	2
Tufts		–		6	–	2	–	0
Army		–		6	–	2	–	1
Colgate		–		6	–	2	–	1
Geneva		–		6	–	2	–	1
Lehigh		–		6	–	2	–	1
NYU		–		6	–	2	–	1
Penn State		–		6	–	2	–	1
Vermont		–		6	–	3	–	1
Brown		–		6	–	4	–	0
Harvard		–		4	–	3	–	1
Carnegie Tech		–		4	–	3	–	1
Penn		–		5	–	4	–	0
Pittsburgh		–		5	–	4	–	0
Bucknell		–		4	–	4	–	1
Columbia		–		4	–	4	–	1
Duquesne		–		4	–	4	–	0
Princeton		–		3	–	3	–	1
Franklin & Marshall		–		3	–	5	–	1
Drexel		–		2	–	6	–	0
Buffalo		–		2	–	5	–	1
Fordham		–		2	–	7	–	0
Boston University		–		1	–	6	–	0
Villanova		–		0	–	7	–	1
Temple		–		0	–	5	–	0
CCNY		–		0	–	7	–	0
Springfield		–		0	–	7	–	0

The 1923 Buffalo Bisons football team represented the University of Buffalo as an independent during the 1923 college football season. Led by James Bond in his first season as head coach, the team compiled a record of 2–5–1.

== Schedule ==
Date	Opponent	Site	Result
October 6	Rochester Optometry	Rotary Field; Buffalo, NY	W 40–0
October 13	Thiel	Rotary Field; Buffalo, NY	L 0–29
October 20	at Alfred	Alfred Field; Alfred, NY	L 6–16
October 27	Clarkson	Rotary Field; Buffalo, NY	T 7–7
November 3	Hamilton	Rotary Field; Buffalo, NY	W 7–6
November 10	at Hobart	Boswell Field; Geneva, NY	L 0–7
November 17	Rochester	Rotary Field; Buffalo, NY	L 6–13
November 24	at Holy Cross	Fitton Field; Worcester, MA	L 0–37
