= 1923 Penn State Nittany Lions football team =

American college football season

1923 Penn State Nittany Lions football
- Conference: Independent
- Record: 6–2–1
- Head coach: Hugo Bezdek (6th season)
- Captain: Joe Bedenk
- Home stadium: New Beaver Field

1923 Eastern college football independents records
	Conf.			Overall
Team	W	L	T	W		L		T
Cornell		–		8	–	0	–	0
Yale		–		8	–	0	–	0
St. John's		–		5	–	0	–	1
Dartmouth		–		8	–	1	–	0
Syracuse		–		8	–	1	–	0
Boston College		–		7	–	1	–	1
Rutgers		–		7	–	1	–	1
Washington & Jefferson		–		6	–	1	–	1
Holy Cross		–		8	–	2	–	0
Lafayette		–		6	–	1	–	2
Tufts		–		6	–	2	–	0
Army		–		6	–	2	–	1
Colgate		–		6	–	2	–	1
Geneva		–		6	–	2	–	1
Lehigh		–		6	–	2	–	1
NYU		–		6	–	2	–	1
Penn State		–		6	–	2	–	1
Vermont		–		6	–	3	–	1
Brown		–		6	–	4	–	0
Harvard		–		4	–	3	–	1
Carnegie Tech		–		4	–	3	–	1
Penn		–		5	–	4	–	0
Pittsburgh		–		5	–	4	–	0
Bucknell		–		4	–	4	–	1
Columbia		–		4	–	4	–	1
Duquesne		–		4	–	4	–	0
Princeton		–		3	–	3	–	1
Franklin & Marshall		–		3	–	5	–	1
Drexel		–		2	–	6	–	0
Buffalo		–		2	–	5	–	1
Fordham		–		2	–	7	–	0
Boston University		–		1	–	6	–	0
Villanova		–		0	–	7	–	1
Temple		–		0	–	5	–	0
CCNY		–		0	–	7	–	0
Springfield		–		0	–	7	–	0

The 1923 Penn State Nittany Lions football team represented the Pennsylvania State College as an independent during the 1923 college football season. The team was coached by Hugo Bezdek and played its home games in New Beaver Field in State College, Pennsylvania.

== Schedule ==
Date	Time	Opponent	Site	Result	Attendance	Source
September 29		Lebanon Valley	New Beaver Field; State College, PA	W 58–0	3,000	
October 6		NC State	New Beaver Field; State College, PA	W 16–0	3,000	
October 13		Gettysburg	New Beaver Field; State College, PA	W 20–0	3,000	
October 20		Navy^{†}	New Beaver Field; State College, PA	W 21–3	20,000	
October 27		vs. West Virginia	Yankee Stadium; Bronx, NY (rivalry)	T 13–13	50,000	
November 3		at Syracuse	Archbold Stadium; Syracuse, NY (rivalry)	L 0–10	25,000	
November 10	2:30 p.m.	Georgia Tech	New Beaver Field; State College, PA	W 7–0	10,000	
November 17		at Penn	Franklin Field; Philadelphia, PA	W 21–0	56,000	
November 29		at Pittsburgh	Forbes Field; Pittsburgh, PA (rivalry)	L 3–20	33,000	
^{†}Homecoming
