= 1923 Brown Bears football team =

American college football season

1923 Brown Bears football
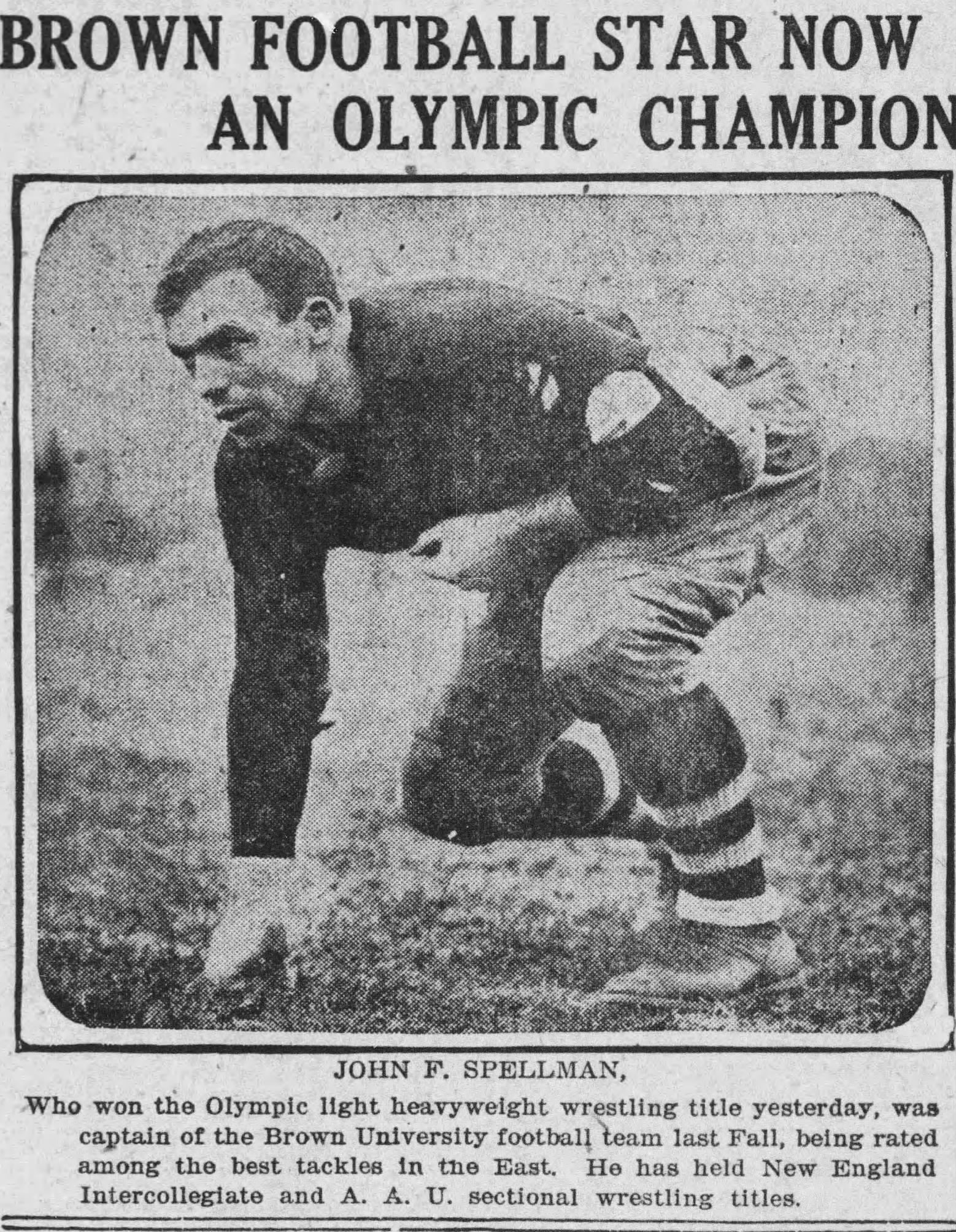
- John Spellman and 1923 Brown Bears football team
- Conference: Independent
- Record: 6–4
- Head coach: Edward N. Robinson (22nd season)
- Captain: J. F. Spellman
- Home stadium: Andrews Field

1923 Eastern college football independents records
	Conf.			Overall
Team	W	L	T	W		L		T
Cornell		–		8	–	0	–	0
Yale		–		8	–	0	–	0
St. John's		–		5	–	0	–	1
Dartmouth		–		8	–	1	–	0
Syracuse		–		8	–	1	–	0
Boston College		–		7	–	1	–	1
Rutgers		–		7	–	1	–	1
Washington & Jefferson		–		6	–	1	–	1
Holy Cross		–		8	–	2	–	0
Lafayette		–		6	–	1	–	2
Tufts		–		6	–	2	–	0
Army		–		6	–	2	–	1
Colgate		–		6	–	2	–	1
Geneva		–		6	–	2	–	1
Lehigh		–		6	–	2	–	1
NYU		–		6	–	2	–	1
Penn State		–		6	–	2	–	1
Vermont		–		6	–	3	–	1
Brown		–		6	–	4	–	0
Harvard		–		4	–	3	–	1
Carnegie Tech		–		4	–	3	–	1
Penn		–		5	–	4	–	0
Pittsburgh		–		5	–	4	–	0
Bucknell		–		4	–	4	–	1
Columbia		–		4	–	4	–	1
Duquesne		–		4	–	4	–	0
Princeton		–		3	–	3	–	1
Franklin & Marshall		–		3	–	5	–	1
Drexel		–		2	–	6	–	0
Buffalo		–		2	–	5	–	1
Fordham		–		2	–	7	–	0
Boston University		–		1	–	6	–	0
Villanova		–		0	–	7	–	1
Temple		–		0	–	5	–	0
CCNY		–		0	–	7	–	0
Springfield		–		0	–	7	–	0

The 1923 Brown Bears football team represented Brown University during the 1923 college football season. Led by 22nd-year head coach Edward N. Robinson, the Bears compiled a record of 6–4.

== Schedule ==
Date	Time	Opponent	Site	Result	Attendance	Source
September 29		Haverford	Andrews Field; Providence, RI	W 27–0		
October 6		Colby	Andrews Field; Providence, RI	W 33–0		
October 13		at Washington & Jefferson	Washington, PA	L 7–12		
October 20		Boston University	Andrews Field; Providence, RI	W 20–3		
October 27	2:30 p.m.	at Yale	Yale Bowl; New Haven, CT	L 0–21	45,000	
November 3		St. Bonaventure	Andrews Field; Providence, RI	W 19–0		
November 10	2:00 p.m.	vs. Dartmouth	Fenway Park; Boston, MA	L 14–16	25,000	
November 17	2:00 p.m.	at Harvard	Harvard Stadium; Boston, MA	W 20–7		
November 24		New Hampshire	Andrews Field; Providence, RI	W 6–0		
November 29		Lehigh	Andrews Field; Providence, RI	L 6–12		
All times are in Eastern time
