= 1923 Duquesne Dukes football team =

American college football season

1923 Duquesne Dukes football
- Conference: Independent
- Record: 4–4
- Head coach: Harold Ballin (2nd season)

1923 Eastern college football independents records
| | Conf. | | | Overall |
| Team | W | L | T | W | | L | | T |
|---|---|---|---|---|---|---|---|---|
| Cornell | | – | | 8 | – | 0 | – | 0 |
| Yale | | – | | 8 | – | 0 | – | 0 |
| St. John's | | – | | 5 | – | 0 | – | 1 |
| Dartmouth | | – | | 8 | – | 1 | – | 0 |
| Syracuse | | – | | 8 | – | 1 | – | 0 |
| Boston College | | – | | 7 | – | 1 | – | 1 |
| Rutgers | | – | | 7 | – | 1 | – | 1 |
| Washington & Jefferson | | – | | 6 | – | 1 | – | 1 |
| Holy Cross | | – | | 8 | – | 2 | – | 0 |
| Lafayette | | – | | 6 | – | 1 | – | 2 |
| Tufts | | – | | 6 | – | 2 | – | 0 |
| Army | | – | | 6 | – | 2 | – | 1 |
| Colgate | | – | | 6 | – | 2 | – | 1 |
| Geneva | | – | | 6 | – | 2 | – | 1 |
| Lehigh | | – | | 6 | – | 2 | – | 1 |
| NYU | | – | | 6 | – | 2 | – | 1 |
| Penn State | | – | | 6 | – | 2 | – | 1 |
| Vermont | | – | | 6 | – | 3 | – | 1 |
| Brown | | – | | 6 | – | 4 | – | 0 |
| Harvard | | – | | 4 | – | 3 | – | 1 |
| Carnegie Tech | | – | | 4 | – | 3 | – | 1 |
| Penn | | – | | 5 | – | 4 | – | 0 |
| Pittsburgh | | – | | 5 | – | 4 | – | 0 |
| Bucknell | | – | | 4 | – | 4 | – | 1 |
| Columbia | | – | | 4 | – | 4 | – | 1 |
| Duquesne | | – | | 4 | – | 4 | – | 0 |
| Princeton | | – | | 3 | – | 3 | – | 1 |
| Franklin & Marshall | | – | | 3 | – | 5 | – | 1 |
| Drexel | | – | | 2 | – | 6 | – | 0 |
| Buffalo | | – | | 2 | – | 5 | – | 1 |
| Fordham | | – | | 2 | – | 7 | – | 0 |
| Boston University | | – | | 1 | – | 6 | – | 0 |
| Villanova | | – | | 0 | – | 7 | – | 1 |
| Temple | | – | | 0 | – | 5 | – | 0 |
| CCNY | | – | | 0 | – | 7 | – | 0 |
| Springfield | | – | | 0 | – | 7 | – | 0 |

The 1923 Duquesne Dukes football team represented Duquesne University during the 1923 college football season. The head coach was Harold Ballin, coaching his second season with the Dukes.

== Schedule ==
| Date | Opponent | Site | Result | Source |
|---|---|---|---|---|
| September 29 | Broaddus | Pittsburgh, PA | W 6–0 | |
| October 6 | Dayton | Pittsburgh, PA | L 0–27 | |
| October 12 | Saint Francis (PA) | Pittsburgh, PA | W 20–0 | |
| October 20 | at Geneva | Geneva Field; Beaver Falls, PA | L 6–33 | |
| October 27 | at Westminster (PA) | New Wilmington, PA | W 6–0 | |
| November 3 | Saint Vincent | Pittsburgh, PA | W 27–3 | |
| November 10 | at Marietta | Marietta, OH | L 0–13 | |
| November 16 | Mount St. Mary's | Pittsburgh, PA | L 0–6 | |
