= 1923 Carnegie Tech Tartans football team =

American college football season

1923 Carnegie Tech Tartans football
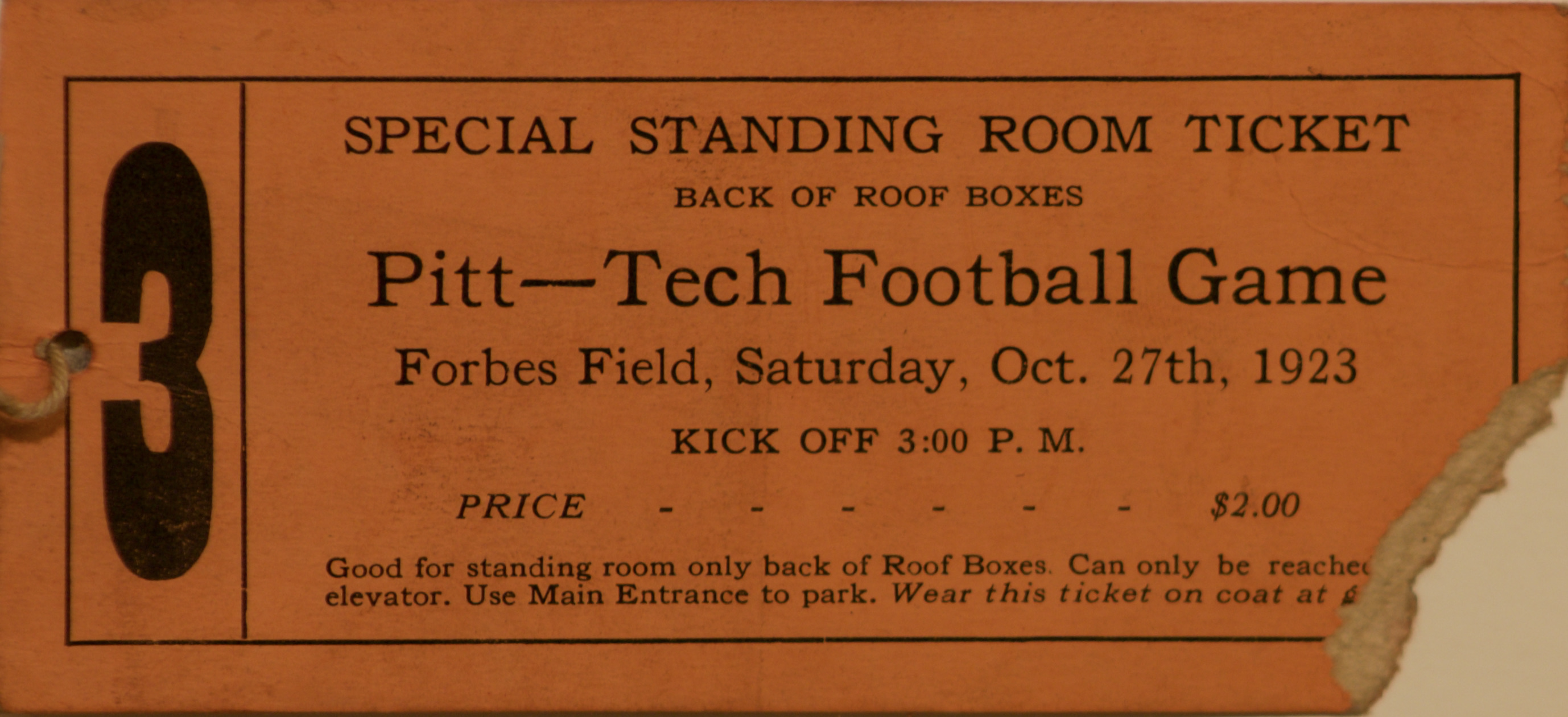
- 1923 game day ticket
- Conference: Independent
- Record: 4–3–1
- Head coach: Walter Steffen (9th season)
- Home stadium: Tech Field

1923 Eastern college football independents records
	Conf.			Overall
Team	W	L	T	W		L		T
Cornell		–		8	–	0	–	0
Yale		–		8	–	0	–	0
St. John's		–		5	–	0	–	1
Dartmouth		–		8	–	1	–	0
Syracuse		–		8	–	1	–	0
Boston College		–		7	–	1	–	1
Rutgers		–		7	–	1	–	1
Washington & Jefferson		–		6	–	1	–	1
Holy Cross		–		8	–	2	–	0
Lafayette		–		6	–	1	–	2
Tufts		–		6	–	2	–	0
Army		–		6	–	2	–	1
Colgate		–		6	–	2	–	1
Geneva		–		6	–	2	–	1
Lehigh		–		6	–	2	–	1
NYU		–		6	–	2	–	1
Penn State		–		6	–	2	–	1
Vermont		–		6	–	3	–	1
Brown		–		6	–	4	–	0
Harvard		–		4	–	3	–	1
Carnegie Tech		–		4	–	3	–	1
Penn		–		5	–	4	–	0
Pittsburgh		–		5	–	4	–	0
Bucknell		–		4	–	4	–	1
Columbia		–		4	–	4	–	1
Duquesne		–		4	–	4	–	0
Princeton		–		3	–	3	–	1
Franklin & Marshall		–		3	–	5	–	1
Drexel		–		2	–	6	–	0
Buffalo		–		2	–	5	–	1
Fordham		–		2	–	7	–	0
Boston University		–		1	–	6	–	0
Villanova		–		0	–	7	–	1
Temple		–		0	–	5	–	0
CCNY		–		0	–	7	–	0
Springfield		–		0	–	7	–	0

The 1923 Carnegie Tech Tartans football team was an American football team that represented the Carnegie Institute of Technology (now known as Carnegie Mellon University) during the 1923 college football season. Led by ninth-year head coach Walter Steffen, Carnegie Tech compiled a record of 4–3–1.

== Schedule ==
Date	Opponent	Site	Result	Attendance	Source
September 29	Toledo	Pittsburgh, PA	W 32–12		
October 6	Thiel	Pittsburgh, PA	W 32–0		
October 13	at John Carroll	University Heights, OH	W 13–0		
October 20	at Washington & Jefferson	College Field; Washington, PA	L 7–9		
October 27	at Pittsburgh	Forbes Field; Pittsburgh, PA	W 7–2	30,000	
November 10	at Detroit	University of Detroit Stadium; Detroit, MI	T 6–6	10,000	
November 17	Lehigh	Bethlehem, PA	L 6–13		
November 24	Notre Dame	Pittsburgh, PA	L 0–26	30,000	
