= 1923 NYU Violets football team =

American college football season

1923 NYU Violets football
- Conference: Independent
- Record: 6–2–1
- Head coach: Tom Thorp (2nd season)
- Home stadium: Ohio Field, Yankee Stadium

1923 Eastern college football independents records
	Conf.			Overall
Team	W	L	T	W		L		T
Cornell		–		8	–	0	–	0
Yale		–		8	–	0	–	0
St. John's		–		5	–	0	–	1
Dartmouth		–		8	–	1	–	0
Syracuse		–		8	–	1	–	0
Boston College		–		7	–	1	–	1
Rutgers		–		7	–	1	–	1
Washington & Jefferson		–		6	–	1	–	1
Holy Cross		–		8	–	2	–	0
Lafayette		–		6	–	1	–	2
Tufts		–		6	–	2	–	0
Army		–		6	–	2	–	1
Colgate		–		6	–	2	–	1
Geneva		–		6	–	2	–	1
Lehigh		–		6	–	2	–	1
NYU		–		6	–	2	–	1
Penn State		–		6	–	2	–	1
Vermont		–		6	–	3	–	1
Brown		–		6	–	4	–	0
Harvard		–		4	–	3	–	1
Carnegie Tech		–		4	–	3	–	1
Penn		–		5	–	4	–	0
Pittsburgh		–		5	–	4	–	0
Bucknell		–		4	–	4	–	1
Columbia		–		4	–	4	–	1
Duquesne		–		4	–	4	–	0
Princeton		–		3	–	3	–	1
Franklin & Marshall		–		3	–	5	–	1
Drexel		–		2	–	6	–	0
Buffalo		–		2	–	5	–	1
Fordham		–		2	–	7	–	0
Boston University		–		1	–	6	–	0
Villanova		–		0	–	7	–	1
Temple		–		0	–	5	–	0
CCNY		–		0	–	7	–	0
Springfield		–		0	–	7	–	0

The 1923 NYU Violets football team was an American football team that represented New York University as an independent during the 1923 college football season. In their second year under head coach Tom Thorp, the team compiled a 6–2–1 record.

== Schedule ==
Date	Opponent	Site	Result	Attendance	Source
September 29	St. Stephen's College	Ohio Field; Bronx, NY	W 14–6		
October 6	Rochester	Ohio Field; Bronx, NY	W 7–0		
October 13	RPI	Ohio Field; Bronx, NY	T 0–0		
October 20	at Rutgers	Neilson Field; New Brunswick, NJ	L 3–7	3,000	
October 27	Rhode Island State	Ohio Field; Bronx, NY	W 21–0		
November 6	vs. Fordham	Yankee Stadium; Bronx, NY	W 20–0	10,000	
November 10	at CCNY	Lewisohn Stadium; New York, NY	W 26–0		
November 17	at Columbia	Baker Field; New York, NY	L 0–21	20,000	
November 24	Boston University	Yankee Stadium; Bronx, NY	W 7–0	2,500	
