= 1923 Boston University football team =

American college football season

1923 Boston University football
- Conference: Independent
- Record: 1–6
- Head coach: Charles Whelan (3rd season)

1923 Eastern college football independents records
	Conf.			Overall
Team	W	L	T	W		L		T
Cornell		–		8	–	0	–	0
Yale		–		8	–	0	–	0
St. John's		–		5	–	0	–	1
Dartmouth		–		8	–	1	–	0
Syracuse		–		8	–	1	–	0
Boston College		–		7	–	1	–	1
Rutgers		–		7	–	1	–	1
Washington & Jefferson		–		6	–	1	–	1
Holy Cross		–		8	–	2	–	0
Lafayette		–		6	–	1	–	2
Tufts		–		6	–	2	–	0
Army		–		6	–	2	–	1
Colgate		–		6	–	2	–	1
Geneva		–		6	–	2	–	1
Lehigh		–		6	–	2	–	1
NYU		–		6	–	2	–	1
Penn State		–		6	–	2	–	1
Vermont		–		6	–	3	–	1
Brown		–		6	–	4	–	0
Harvard		–		4	–	3	–	1
Carnegie Tech		–		4	–	3	–	1
Penn		–		5	–	4	–	0
Pittsburgh		–		5	–	4	–	0
Bucknell		–		4	–	4	–	1
Columbia		–		4	–	4	–	1
Duquesne		–		4	–	4	–	0
Princeton		–		3	–	3	–	1
Franklin & Marshall		–		3	–	5	–	1
Drexel		–		2	–	6	–	0
Buffalo		–		2	–	5	–	1
Fordham		–		2	–	7	–	0
Boston University		–		1	–	6	–	0
Villanova		–		0	–	7	–	1
Temple		–		0	–	5	–	0
CCNY		–		0	–	7	–	0
Springfield		–		0	–	7	–	0

The 1923 Boston University football team was an American football team that represented Boston University as an independent during the 1923 college football season. In its third season under head coach Charles Whelan, the team compiled a 1–6 record, was shut out in five of seven games, and was outscored by a total of 181 to 21.

== Schedule ==
Date	Opponent	Site	Result	Attendance	Source
October 13	at Dartmouth	Memorial Field; Hanover, NH	L 0–24		
October 20	at Brown	Andrews Field; Providence, RI	L 3–20		
October 27	at Holy Cross	Fitton Field; Worcester, MA	L 0–13		
November 3	at Colby	Waterville, ME	W 18–7		
November 10	at Syracuse	Archbold Stadium; Syracuse, NY	L 0–49		
November 17	at Rutgers	Neilson Field; New Brunswick, NJ	L 0–61	> 3,000	
November 24	at NYU	Yankee Stadium; Bronx, NY	L 0–7	2,500	
