= 1923 Geneva Covenanters football team =

American college football season

1923 Geneva Covenanters football
- Conference: Independent
- Record: 6–2–1
- Head coach: Tom Davies (1st season)
- Captain: William Nick
- Home stadium: Geneva Field, High School Field

1923 Eastern college football independents records
	Conf.			Overall
Team	W	L	T	W		L		T
Cornell		–		8	–	0	–	0
Yale		–		8	–	0	–	0
St. John's		–		5	–	0	–	1
Dartmouth		–		8	–	1	–	0
Syracuse		–		8	–	1	–	0
Boston College		–		7	–	1	–	1
Rutgers		–		7	–	1	–	1
Washington & Jefferson		–		6	–	1	–	1
Holy Cross		–		8	–	2	–	0
Lafayette		–		6	–	1	–	2
Tufts		–		6	–	2	–	0
Army		–		6	–	2	–	1
Colgate		–		6	–	2	–	1
Geneva		–		6	–	2	–	1
Lehigh		–		6	–	2	–	1
NYU		–		6	–	2	–	1
Penn State		–		6	–	2	–	1
Vermont		–		6	–	3	–	1
Brown		–		6	–	4	–	0
Harvard		–		4	–	3	–	1
Carnegie Tech		–		4	–	3	–	1
Penn		–		5	–	4	–	0
Pittsburgh		–		5	–	4	–	0
Bucknell		–		4	–	4	–	1
Columbia		–		4	–	4	–	1
Duquesne		–		4	–	4	–	0
Princeton		–		3	–	3	–	1
Franklin & Marshall		–		3	–	5	–	1
Drexel		–		2	–	6	–	0
Buffalo		–		2	–	5	–	1
Fordham		–		2	–	7	–	0
Boston University		–		1	–	6	–	0
Villanova		–		0	–	7	–	1
Temple		–		0	–	5	–	0
CCNY		–		0	–	7	–	0
Springfield		–		0	–	7	–	0

The 1923 Geneva Covenanters football team was an American football team that represented Geneva College as an independent during the 1923 college football season. Led by Tom Davies in his first and only year as head coach, the team compiled a record of 6–2–1.

== Schedule ==
Date	Opponent	Site	Result	Attendance	Source
September 29	at Waynesburg	College Field; Waynesburg, PA	W 12–7		
October 6	Juniata	Geneva Field; Beaver Falls, PA	W 50–0		
October 13	vs. Bethany (WV)	Wheeling, WV	L 0–7		
October 20	Duquesne	Geneva Field; Beaver Falls, PA	W 33–6		
October 27	Ashland	Geneva Field; Beaver Falls, PA	W 34–7		
November 3	at Allegheny	Montgomery Field; Meadville, PA	L 0–14	4,000	
November 10	at Thiel	Packard Park; Greenville, PA	T 0–0		
November 17	Grove City^{†}	Geneva Field; Beaver Falls, PA	W 14–0		
November 24	Westminster (PA)	High School Field; Beaver Falls, PA	W 19–0		
^{†}Homecoming
