= 1923 Syracuse Orangemen football team =

American college football season

1923 Syracuse Orangemen football
- Stagg Field and the 1923 Syracuse Orangemen football team
- Conference: Independent
- Record: 8–1
- Head coach: Chick Meehan (4th season)
- Captain: Pete MacRae
- Home stadium: Archbold Stadium

1923 Eastern college football independents records
| | Conf. | | | Overall |
| Team | W | L | T | W | | L | | T |
|---|---|---|---|---|---|---|---|---|
| Cornell | | – | | 8 | – | 0 | – | 0 |
| Yale | | – | | 8 | – | 0 | – | 0 |
| St. John's | | – | | 5 | – | 0 | – | 1 |
| Dartmouth | | – | | 8 | – | 1 | – | 0 |
| Syracuse | | – | | 8 | – | 1 | – | 0 |
| Boston College | | – | | 7 | – | 1 | – | 1 |
| Rutgers | | – | | 7 | – | 1 | – | 1 |
| Washington & Jefferson | | – | | 6 | – | 1 | – | 1 |
| Holy Cross | | – | | 8 | – | 2 | – | 0 |
| Lafayette | | – | | 6 | – | 1 | – | 2 |
| Tufts | | – | | 6 | – | 2 | – | 0 |
| Army | | – | | 6 | – | 2 | – | 1 |
| Colgate | | – | | 6 | – | 2 | – | 1 |
| Geneva | | – | | 6 | – | 2 | – | 1 |
| Lehigh | | – | | 6 | – | 2 | – | 1 |
| NYU | | – | | 6 | – | 2 | – | 1 |
| Penn State | | – | | 6 | – | 2 | – | 1 |
| Vermont | | – | | 6 | – | 3 | – | 1 |
| Brown | | – | | 6 | – | 4 | – | 0 |
| Harvard | | – | | 4 | – | 3 | – | 1 |
| Carnegie Tech | | – | | 4 | – | 3 | – | 1 |
| Penn | | – | | 5 | – | 4 | – | 0 |
| Pittsburgh | | – | | 5 | – | 4 | – | 0 |
| Bucknell | | – | | 4 | – | 4 | – | 1 |
| Columbia | | – | | 4 | – | 4 | – | 1 |
| Duquesne | | – | | 4 | – | 4 | – | 0 |
| Princeton | | – | | 3 | – | 3 | – | 1 |
| Franklin & Marshall | | – | | 3 | – | 5 | – | 1 |
| Drexel | | – | | 2 | – | 6 | – | 0 |
| Buffalo | | – | | 2 | – | 5 | – | 1 |
| Fordham | | – | | 2 | – | 7 | – | 0 |
| Boston University | | – | | 1 | – | 6 | – | 0 |
| Villanova | | – | | 0 | – | 7 | – | 1 |
| Temple | | – | | 0 | – | 5 | – | 0 |
| CCNY | | – | | 0 | – | 7 | – | 0 |
| Springfield | | – | | 0 | – | 7 | – | 0 |

The 1923 Syracuse Orangemen football team represented Syracuse University as an independent during the 1923 college football season.

== Schedule ==
| Date | Opponent | Site | Result | Attendance | Source |
|---|---|---|---|---|---|
| September 29 | Hobart | Archbold Stadium; Syracuse, NY | W 33–0 | 12,000 | |
| October 6 | William & Mary | Archbold Stadium; Syracuse, NY | W 61–3 | 10,000 | |
| October 13 | Alabama | Archbold Stadium; Syracuse, NY | W 23–0 | 9,000 | |
| October 20 | vs. Pittsburgh | Yankee Stadium; Bronx, NY (rivalry) | W 3–0 | 22,000 | |
| October 27 | Springfield | Archbold Stadium; Syracuse, NY | W 44–0 | | |
| November 3 | Penn State | Archbold Stadium; Syracuse, NY (rivalry) | W 10–0 | 20,000–25,000 | |
| November 10 | Boston University | Archbold Stadium; Syracuse, NY | W 49–0 | | |
| November 17 | Colgate | Archbold Stadium; Syracuse, NY (rivalry) | L 7–16 | 30,000 | |
| November 24 | at Nebraska | Memorial Stadium; Lincoln, NE | W 7–0 | 35,000 | |
