= 1923 Colgate football team =

American college football season

1923 Colgate football
- Conference: Independent
- Record: 6–2–1
- Head coach: Dick Harlow (2nd season)
- Captain: Jim Leonard
- Home stadium: Whitnall Field

1923 Eastern college football independents records
	Conf.			Overall
Team	W	L	T	W		L		T
Cornell		–		8	–	0	–	0
Yale		–		8	–	0	–	0
St. John's		–		5	–	0	–	1
Dartmouth		–		8	–	1	–	0
Syracuse		–		8	–	1	–	0
Boston College		–		7	–	1	–	1
Rutgers		–		7	–	1	–	1
Washington & Jefferson		–		6	–	1	–	1
Holy Cross		–		8	–	2	–	0
Lafayette		–		6	–	1	–	2
Tufts		–		6	–	2	–	0
Army		–		6	–	2	–	1
Colgate		–		6	–	2	–	1
Geneva		–		6	–	2	–	1
Lehigh		–		6	–	2	–	1
NYU		–		6	–	2	–	1
Penn State		–		6	–	2	–	1
Vermont		–		6	–	3	–	1
Brown		–		6	–	4	–	0
Harvard		–		4	–	3	–	1
Carnegie Tech		–		4	–	3	–	1
Penn		–		5	–	4	–	0
Pittsburgh		–		5	–	4	–	0
Bucknell		–		4	–	4	–	1
Columbia		–		4	–	4	–	1
Duquesne		–		4	–	4	–	0
Princeton		–		3	–	3	–	1
Franklin & Marshall		–		3	–	5	–	1
Drexel		–		2	–	6	–	0
Buffalo		–		2	–	5	–	1
Fordham		–		2	–	7	–	0
Boston University		–		1	–	6	–	0
Villanova		–		0	–	7	–	1
Temple		–		0	–	5	–	0
CCNY		–		0	–	7	–	0
Springfield		–		0	–	7	–	0

The 1923 Colgate football team was an American football team that represented Colgate University as an independent during the 1923 college football season. In its second season under head coach Dick Harlow, the team compiled a 6–2–1 record and outscored opponents by a total of 233 to 73. Jim Leonard was the team captain. The team played its home games on Whitnall Field in Hamilton, New York.

== Schedule ==
Date	Opponent	Site	Result	Attendance	Source
September 22	Alfred	Whitnall Field; Hamilton, NY	W 14–0		
September 29	Clarkson	Whitnall Field; Hamilton, NY	W 42–0		
October 6	Niagara	Whitnall Field; Hamilton, NY	W 55–0		
October 13	at Ohio State	Ohio Stadium; Columbus, OH	T 23–23	40,000	
October 20	at Cornell	Schoellkopf Field; Ithaca, NY (rivalry)	L 7–34	15,000	
October 27	vs. Ohio Wesleyan	Utica Park; Utica, NY	W 27–0	6,000	
November 3	at Navy	Worden Field; Annapolis, MD	L 0–9		
November 10	at Rochester	Rochester, NY	W 49–0		
November 17	at Syracuse	Archbold Stadium; Syracuse, NY (rivalry)	W 16–7	20,000	
