= 1923 Holy Cross football team =

American college football season

1923 Holy Cross football
- Conference: Independent
- Record: 8–2
- Head coach: Cleo A. O'Donnell (5th season)
- Home stadium: Fitton Field

1923 Eastern college football independents records
	Conf.			Overall
Team	W	L	T	W		L		T
Cornell		–		8	–	0	–	0
Yale		–		8	–	0	–	0
St. John's		–		5	–	0	–	1
Dartmouth		–		8	–	1	–	0
Syracuse		–		8	–	1	–	0
Boston College		–		7	–	1	–	1
Rutgers		–		7	–	1	–	1
Washington & Jefferson		–		6	–	1	–	1
Holy Cross		–		8	–	2	–	0
Lafayette		–		6	–	1	–	2
Tufts		–		6	–	2	–	0
Army		–		6	–	2	–	1
Colgate		–		6	–	2	–	1
Geneva		–		6	–	2	–	1
Lehigh		–		6	–	2	–	1
NYU		–		6	–	2	–	1
Penn State		–		6	–	2	–	1
Vermont		–		6	–	3	–	1
Brown		–		6	–	4	–	0
Harvard		–		4	–	3	–	1
Carnegie Tech		–		4	–	3	–	1
Penn		–		5	–	4	–	0
Pittsburgh		–		5	–	4	–	0
Bucknell		–		4	–	4	–	1
Columbia		–		4	–	4	–	1
Duquesne		–		4	–	4	–	0
Princeton		–		3	–	3	–	1
Franklin & Marshall		–		3	–	5	–	1
Drexel		–		2	–	6	–	0
Buffalo		–		2	–	5	–	1
Fordham		–		2	–	7	–	0
Boston University		–		1	–	6	–	0
Villanova		–		0	–	7	–	1
Temple		–		0	–	5	–	0
CCNY		–		0	–	7	–	0
Springfield		–		0	–	7	–	0

The 1923 Holy Cross football team was an American football team that represented the College of the Holy Cross as an independent during the 1923 college football season. In its fifth season under head coach Cleo A. O'Donnell, the team compiled an 8–2 record. The team played its home games at Fitton Field in Worcester, Massachusetts.

== Schedule ==
Date	Opponent	Site	Result	Attendance	Source
September 29	U.S. Submarine Base	Fitton Field; Worcester, MA	W 49–0		
October 6	Lebanon Valley	Fitton Field; Worcester, MA	W 55–0		
October 13	Providence College	Fitton Field; Worcester, MA	W 32–0		
October 20	at Harvard	Harvard Stadium; Boston, MA	L 0–6		
October 27	Boston University	Fitton Field; Worcester, MA	W 13–0		
November 3	Vermont	Fitton Field; Worcester, MA	W 16–0		
November 10	at Fordham	Yankee Stadium; Bronx, NY	W 23–7		
November 17	Springfield	Fitton Field; Worcester, MA	W 40–0		
November 25	Buffalo	Fitton Field; Worcester, MA	W 37–0		
December 1	at Boston College	Braves Field; Boston, MA (rivalry)	L 7–16	47,000	
