= 1923 Lafayette football team =

American football club

1923 Lafayette football
- Conference: Independent
- Record: 6–1–2
- Head coach: Jock Sutherland (5th season)
- Captain: Art Deibel
- Home stadium: March Field

1923 Eastern college football independents records
	Conf.			Overall
Team	W	L	T	W		L		T
Cornell		–		8	–	0	–	0
Yale		–		8	–	0	–	0
St. John's		–		5	–	0	–	1
Dartmouth		–		8	–	1	–	0
Syracuse		–		8	–	1	–	0
Boston College		–		7	–	1	–	1
Rutgers		–		7	–	1	–	1
Washington & Jefferson		–		6	–	1	–	1
Holy Cross		–		8	–	2	–	0
Lafayette		–		6	–	1	–	2
Tufts		–		6	–	2	–	0
Army		–		6	–	2	–	1
Colgate		–		6	–	2	–	1
Geneva		–		6	–	2	–	1
Lehigh		–		6	–	2	–	1
NYU		–		6	–	2	–	1
Penn State		–		6	–	2	–	1
Vermont		–		6	–	3	–	1
Brown		–		6	–	4	–	0
Harvard		–		4	–	3	–	1
Carnegie Tech		–		4	–	3	–	1
Penn		–		5	–	4	–	0
Pittsburgh		–		5	–	4	–	0
Bucknell		–		4	–	4	–	1
Columbia		–		4	–	4	–	1
Duquesne		–		4	–	4	–	0
Princeton		–		3	–	3	–	1
Franklin & Marshall		–		3	–	5	–	1
Drexel		–		2	–	6	–	0
Buffalo		–		2	–	5	–	1
Fordham		–		2	–	7	–	0
Boston University		–		1	–	6	–	0
Villanova		–		0	–	7	–	1
Temple		–		0	–	5	–	0
CCNY		–		0	–	7	–	0
Springfield		–		0	–	7	–	0

The 1923 Lafayette football team was an American football team that represented Lafayette College as an independent during the 1923 college football season. In its fifth and final season under head coach Jock Sutherland, the team compiled a 6–1–2 record. Art Deibel was the team captain. The team played its home games at March Field in Easton, Pennsylvania.

== Schedule ==
Date	Opponent	Site	Result	Attendance	Source
September 29	Muhlenberg	March Field; Easton, PA	W 20–0		
October 6	at Pittsburgh	Forbes Field; Pittsburgh, PA	L 0–7	18,000	
October 13	Franklin & Marshall	March Field; Easton, PA	W 33–0		
October 20	Springfield	March Field; Easton, PA	W 21–0		
October 27	Rutgers	March Field; Easton, PA	T 6–6		
November 3	vs. Washington & Jefferson	Polo Grounds; New York, NY	T 6–6		
November 10	at Penn	Franklin Field; Philadelphia, PA	W 8–6		
November 17	Dayton	March Field; Easton, PA	W 45–0		
November 24	at Lehigh	Taylor Stadium; Bethlehem, PA (rivalry)	W 13–3		
