= 1923 Vermont Green and Gold football team =

American college football season

1923 Vermont Green and Gold football
- Conference: Independent
- Record: 6–3–1
- Head coach: Tom Keady (3rd season)
- Home stadium: Centennial Field

1923 Eastern college football independents records
	Conf.			Overall
Team	W	L	T	W		L		T
Cornell		–		8	–	0	–	0
Yale		–		8	–	0	–	0
St. John's		–		5	–	0	–	1
Dartmouth		–		8	–	1	–	0
Syracuse		–		8	–	1	–	0
Boston College		–		7	–	1	–	1
Rutgers		–		7	–	1	–	1
Washington & Jefferson		–		6	–	1	–	1
Holy Cross		–		8	–	2	–	0
Lafayette		–		6	–	1	–	2
Tufts		–		6	–	2	–	0
Army		–		6	–	2	–	1
Colgate		–		6	–	2	–	1
Geneva		–		6	–	2	–	1
Lehigh		–		6	–	2	–	1
NYU		–		6	–	2	–	1
Penn State		–		6	–	2	–	1
Vermont		–		6	–	3	–	1
Brown		–		6	–	4	–	0
Harvard		–		4	–	3	–	1
Carnegie Tech		–		4	–	3	–	1
Penn		–		5	–	4	–	0
Pittsburgh		–		5	–	4	–	0
Bucknell		–		4	–	4	–	1
Columbia		–		4	–	4	–	1
Duquesne		–		4	–	4	–	0
Princeton		–		3	–	3	–	1
Franklin & Marshall		–		3	–	5	–	1
Drexel		–		2	–	6	–	0
Buffalo		–		2	–	5	–	1
Fordham		–		2	–	7	–	0
Boston University		–		1	–	6	–	0
Villanova		–		0	–	7	–	1
Temple		–		0	–	5	–	0
CCNY		–		0	–	7	–	0
Springfield		–		0	–	7	–	0

The 1923 Vermont Green and Gold football team was an American football team that represented the University of Vermont as an independent during the 1923 college football season. In their third year under head coach Tom Keady, the team compiled a 6–3–1 record. This season would mark the first time in Vermont's rivalry with Maine that UVM would defeat them two seasons in a row, be the last time they defeated them until 1964, and the last time the two schools would play until 1950.

== Schedule ==
Date	Opponent	Site	Result	Attendance	Source
September 29	Maine	Centennial Field; Burlington, VT	W 7–6		
October 6	at Springfield	Pratt Field; Springfield, MA	W 26–7		
October 13	USS Utah	Centennial Field; Burlington, VT	W 28–0		
October 20	Dartmouth	Centennial Field; Burlington, VT	L 2–27		
October 27	vs. New Hampshire	Textile Field; Manchester, NH	W 28–7	6,000	
November 3	at Holy Cross	Fitton Field; Worcester, MA	L 0–16		
November 10	at Norwich	Sabine Field; Northfield, VT	W 34–0		
November 12	Middlebury	Centennial Field; Burlington, VT	W 13–0		
November 24	at Boston College	Braves Field; Boston, MA	T 0–0		
November 29	at Marquette	Milwaukee, WI	L 0–20		
