= 1923 Rutgers Queensmen football team =

American college football season

1923 Rutgers Queensmen football
- Conference: Independent
- Record: 7–1–1
- Head coach: George Sanford (11th season)
- Home stadium: Neilson Field

1923 Eastern college football independents records
	Conf.			Overall
Team	W	L	T	W		L		T
Cornell		–		8	–	0	–	0
Yale		–		8	–	0	–	0
St. John's		–		5	–	0	–	1
Dartmouth		–		8	–	1	–	0
Syracuse		–		8	–	1	–	0
Boston College		–		7	–	1	–	1
Rutgers		–		7	–	1	–	1
Washington & Jefferson		–		6	–	1	–	1
Holy Cross		–		8	–	2	–	0
Lafayette		–		6	–	1	–	2
Tufts		–		6	–	2	–	0
Army		–		6	–	2	–	1
Colgate		–		6	–	2	–	1
Geneva		–		6	–	2	–	1
Lehigh		–		6	–	2	–	1
NYU		–		6	–	2	–	1
Penn State		–		6	–	2	–	1
Vermont		–		6	–	3	–	1
Brown		–		6	–	4	–	0
Harvard		–		4	–	3	–	1
Carnegie Tech		–		4	–	3	–	1
Penn		–		5	–	4	–	0
Pittsburgh		–		5	–	4	–	0
Bucknell		–		4	–	4	–	1
Columbia		–		4	–	4	–	1
Duquesne		–		4	–	4	–	0
Princeton		–		3	–	3	–	1
Franklin & Marshall		–		3	–	5	–	1
Drexel		–		2	–	6	–	0
Buffalo		–		2	–	5	–	1
Fordham		–		2	–	7	–	0
Boston University		–		1	–	6	–	0
Villanova		–		0	–	7	–	1
Temple		–		0	–	5	–	0
CCNY		–		0	–	7	–	0
Springfield		–		0	–	7	–	0

The 1923 Rutgers Queensmen football team was an American football team that represented Rutgers University as an independent during the 1923 college football season. In their 11th and final season under head coach George Sanford, the Queensmen compiled a 7–1–1 record and outscored their opponents, 260 to 36. The team shut out six of nine opponents, including victories over Villanova (44–0), Richmond (56–0), Boston University (61–0), and Fordham (42–0), but lost to West Virginia (27–7).

The team was led by Homer Hazel who played for the 1916, dropped out due to lack of funds, and returned in 1923 at age 28. During the 1923 season, he played at fullback, end, and quarterback, tallying 10 touchdowns and 85 points. Described as "muscular, fast and agile", he "could run, block, tackle, kick, and pass." He was credited with a 75-yard punt, as well as the longest pass in college football that year, a pass that covered 69 yards in the air. He also scored a touchdown on his own kickoff on October 6, 1923, when an opposing player fumbled the ball behind the goal line, and Hazel fell on the loose ball for the touchdown. At the end of the season, Hazel was selected by Walter Camp as a first-team end on the 1923 All-America team.

Other key players included team captain and tackle William Kingman, quarterback "Bus" Terrill, lineman Dave Bender, back Carl White and halfback Henry Benkert.

At the end of the 1923 season, Sanford surprised the football world by retiring from the game at age 53. He was inducted into the College Football Hall of Fame in 1971.

== Schedule ==
Date	Opponent	Site	Result	Attendance	Source
September 29	Pennsylvania Military	Neilson Field; New Brunswick, NJ	W 27–0	4,500	
October 6	Villanova	Neilson Field; New Brunswick, NJ	W 44–0	3,000	
October 13	Lehigh	Neilson Field; New Brunswick, NJ	W 10–0	8,000	
October 20	NYU	Neilson Field; New Brunswick, NJ	W 7–3	3,000	
October 27	at Lafayette	March Field; Easton, PA	T 6–6		
November 6	vs. West Virginia	Polo Grounds; New York, NY	L 7–27	20,000	
November 10	Richmond	Neilson Field; New Brunswick, NJ	W 56–0		
November 17	Boston University	Neilson Field; New Brunswick, NJ	W 61–0	> 3,000	
November 24	vs. Fordham	Ashland Stadium; East Orange, NJ	W 42–0	5,000	
