= 1923 Cornell Big Red football team =

American college football season

1923 Cornell Big Red football

Co-national champion (Sagarin)
- Conference: Independent
- Record: 8–0
- Head coach: Gil Dobie (4th season)
- Offensive scheme: Single-wing
- Base defense: 6–3–2
- Captain: George Pfann
- Home stadium: Schoellkopf Field

Uniform
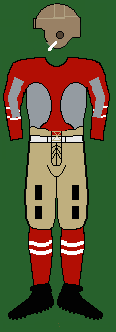

1923 Eastern college football independents records
	Conf.			Overall
Team	W	L	T	W		L		T
Cornell		–		8	–	0	–	0
Yale		–		8	–	0	–	0
St. John's		–		5	–	0	–	1
Dartmouth		–		8	–	1	–	0
Syracuse		–		8	–	1	–	0
Boston College		–		7	–	1	–	1
Rutgers		–		7	–	1	–	1
Washington & Jefferson		–		6	–	1	–	1
Holy Cross		–		8	–	2	–	0
Lafayette		–		6	–	1	–	2
Tufts		–		6	–	2	–	0
Army		–		6	–	2	–	1
Colgate		–		6	–	2	–	1
Geneva		–		6	–	2	–	1
Lehigh		–		6	–	2	–	1
NYU		–		6	–	2	–	1
Penn State		–		6	–	2	–	1
Vermont		–		6	–	3	–	1
Brown		–		6	–	4	–	0
Harvard		–		4	–	3	–	1
Carnegie Tech		–		4	–	3	–	1
Penn		–		5	–	4	–	0
Pittsburgh		–		5	–	4	–	0
Bucknell		–		4	–	4	–	1
Columbia		–		4	–	4	–	1
Duquesne		–		4	–	4	–	0
Princeton		–		3	–	3	–	1
Franklin & Marshall		–		3	–	5	–	1
Drexel		–		2	–	6	–	0
Buffalo		–		2	–	5	–	1
Fordham		–		2	–	7	–	0
Boston University		–		1	–	6	–	0
Villanova		–		0	–	7	–	1
Temple		–		0	–	5	–	0
CCNY		–		0	–	7	–	0
Springfield		–		0	–	7	–	0

The 1923 Cornell Big Red football team was an American football team that represented Cornell University as an independent during the 1923 college football season. The team finished with an 8–0 record, shut out five of eight opponents, and outscored all opponents by a total of 339 to 27. The 1923 season was part of 26-game winning streak that began in October 1921 and ended in October 1924 and included national championship claims for 1921, 1922, and 1923.

There was no contemporaneous system in 1923 for determining a national champion. However, Cornell was retroactively named as the national champion by Jeff Sagarin in 1978. Illinois, Michigan, and Yale were selected as the 1923 national champion or co-champion by other selectors.

Cornell quarterback George Pfann was a consensus first-team player on the 1923 All-America college football team. Tackle Frank Sundstrom also received first-team All-America honors from Walter Camp, Lawrence Perry, and Percy Haughton.

== Schedule ==
Date	Opponent	Site	Result	Attendance	Source
September 29	St. Bonaventure	Schoellkopf Field; Ithaca, NY	W 41–6		
October 6	Susquehanna	Schoellkopf Field; Ithaca, NY	W 84–0		
October 13	Williams	Schoellkopf Field; Ithaca, NY	W 28–6		
October 20	Colgate	Schoellkopf Field; Ithaca, NY (rivalry)	W 34–7	15,000	
November 3	at Dartmouth	Memorial Field; Hanover, NH (rivalry)	W 32–7	15,000	
November 10	at Columbia	Polo Grounds; New York, NY (rivalry)	W 35–0	30,000	
November 17	Johns Hopkins	Schoellkopf Field; Ithaca, NY	W 52–0		
November 29	at Penn	Franklin Field; Philadelphia, PA (rivalry)	W 14–7	57,000	

== Roster ==
- Frank O. Affeld, C
- John H. Berean, G
- Brigden, E
- Elias F. Buckley, E
- Charles E. Cassidy, E
- Dexter, E
- Frend, HB
- Frank L. Henderson, E
- Francis Kearney, T
- Harold F. Kneen, E
- McWilliam, C
- Robert Morris, G
- Robert F. Patterson, HB
- George Pfann, QB
- Floyd Ramsey, HB
- Richard T. Raymond, E
- Henry M. Reed, C
- Rooney, HB
- Bernard E. Savage, T
- Smith, HB
- Sullivan, T
- Frank Sundstrom, T
- Benjamin E. Tilton, HB
- Trousdell, G
- Henry S. Wade, HB
- Wallendorf, G
- Webster, QB
- Walter Whitestone, QB
