= 1923 Temple Owls football team =

American college football season

1923 Temple Owls football
- Conference: Independent
- Record: 0–5
- Head coach: M. Francois D'Eliscu (2nd season)
- Captain: Van Dyke Conover

1923 Eastern college football independents records
	Conf.			Overall
Team	W	L	T	W		L		T
Cornell		–		8	–	0	–	0
Yale		–		8	–	0	–	0
St. John's		–		5	–	0	–	1
Dartmouth		–		8	–	1	–	0
Syracuse		–		8	–	1	–	0
Boston College		–		7	–	1	–	1
Rutgers		–		7	–	1	–	1
Washington & Jefferson		–		6	–	1	–	1
Holy Cross		–		8	–	2	–	0
Lafayette		–		6	–	1	–	2
Tufts		–		6	–	2	–	0
Army		–		6	–	2	–	1
Colgate		–		6	–	2	–	1
Geneva		–		6	–	2	–	1
Lehigh		–		6	–	2	–	1
NYU		–		6	–	2	–	1
Penn State		–		6	–	2	–	1
Vermont		–		6	–	3	–	1
Brown		–		6	–	4	–	0
Harvard		–		4	–	3	–	1
Carnegie Tech		–		4	–	3	–	1
Penn		–		5	–	4	–	0
Pittsburgh		–		5	–	4	–	0
Bucknell		–		4	–	4	–	1
Columbia		–		4	–	4	–	1
Duquesne		–		4	–	4	–	0
Princeton		–		3	–	3	–	1
Franklin & Marshall		–		3	–	5	–	1
Drexel		–		2	–	6	–	0
Buffalo		–		2	–	5	–	1
Fordham		–		2	–	7	–	0
Boston University		–		1	–	6	–	0
Villanova		–		0	–	7	–	1
Temple		–		0	–	5	–	0
CCNY		–		0	–	7	–	0
Springfield		–		0	–	7	–	0

The 1923 Temple Owls football team was an American football team that represented Temple University as an independent during the 1923 college football season. In its second and final season under head coach M. Francois D'Eliscu, the team compiled a 0–5 record.

== Schedule ==
Date	Opponent	Site	Result	Attendance	Source
October 6	at Haverford	Haverford, PA	L 0–3		
October 20	at Juniata	Huntingdon, PA	L 6–14		
October 27	at Ursinus	Patterson Field; Collegeville, PA	L 0–52		
November 10	at Susquehanna	Selinsgrove, PA	L 7–25		
November 17	Drexel	Philadelphia	L 0–7		
