= 1923 Princeton Tigers football team =

American college football season

1923 Princeton Tigers football
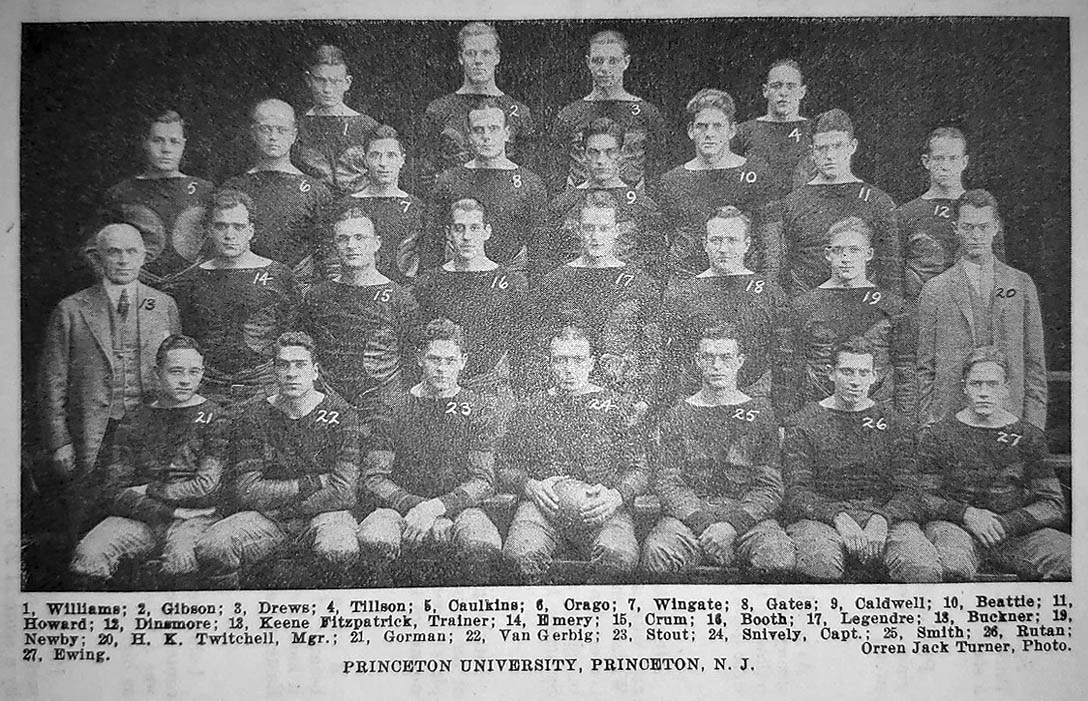
- Conference: Independent
- Record: 3–3–1
- Head coach: Bill Roper (10th season)
- Captain: A. Barr Snively
- Home stadium: Palmer Stadium

1923 Eastern college football independents records
	Conf.			Overall
Team	W	L	T	W		L		T
Cornell		–		8	–	0	–	0
Yale		–		8	–	0	–	0
St. John's		–		5	–	0	–	1
Dartmouth		–		8	–	1	–	0
Syracuse		–		8	–	1	–	0
Boston College		–		7	–	1	–	1
Rutgers		–		7	–	1	–	1
Washington & Jefferson		–		6	–	1	–	1
Holy Cross		–		8	–	2	–	0
Lafayette		–		6	–	1	–	2
Tufts		–		6	–	2	–	0
Army		–		6	–	2	–	1
Colgate		–		6	–	2	–	1
Geneva		–		6	–	2	–	1
Lehigh		–		6	–	2	–	1
NYU		–		6	–	2	–	1
Penn State		–		6	–	2	–	1
Vermont		–		6	–	3	–	1
Brown		–		6	–	4	–	0
Harvard		–		4	–	3	–	1
Carnegie Tech		–		4	–	3	–	1
Penn		–		5	–	4	–	0
Pittsburgh		–		5	–	4	–	0
Bucknell		–		4	–	4	–	1
Columbia		–		4	–	4	–	1
Duquesne		–		4	–	4	–	0
Princeton		–		3	–	3	–	1
Franklin & Marshall		–		3	–	5	–	1
Drexel		–		2	–	6	–	0
Buffalo		–		2	–	5	–	1
Fordham		–		2	–	7	–	0
Boston University		–		1	–	6	–	0
Villanova		–		0	–	7	–	1
Temple		–		0	–	5	–	0
CCNY		–		0	–	7	–	0
Springfield		–		0	–	7	–	0

The 1923 Princeton Tigers football team represented Princeton University in the 1923 college football season. The team finished with a 3–3–1 record under 10th-year head coach Bill Roper. No Princeton players were first-team honorees on the 1923 College Football All-America Team.

== Schedule ==
Date	Time	Opponent	Site	Result	Attendance	Source
October 6		Johns Hopkins	Palmer Stadium; Princeton, NJ	W 16–7	7,000	
October 13		Georgetown	Palmer Stadium; Princeton, NJ	W 17–0	10,000	
October 20		Notre Dame	Palmer Stadium; Princeton, NJ	L 2–25	30,000	
October 27	2:30 p.m.	vs. Navy	Baltimore Stadium; Baltimore, MD	T 3–3	45,000	
November 3		Swarthmore	Palmer Stadium; Princeton, NJ	W 35–6		
November 10		Harvard	Palmer Stadium; Princeton, NJ (rivalry)	L 0–5	55,000–56,000	
November 17		at Yale	Yale Bowl; New Haven, CT (rivalry)	L 0–27	80,000	
All times are in Eastern time
