= 1923 Fordham Maroon football team =

American college football season

1923 Fordham Maroon football
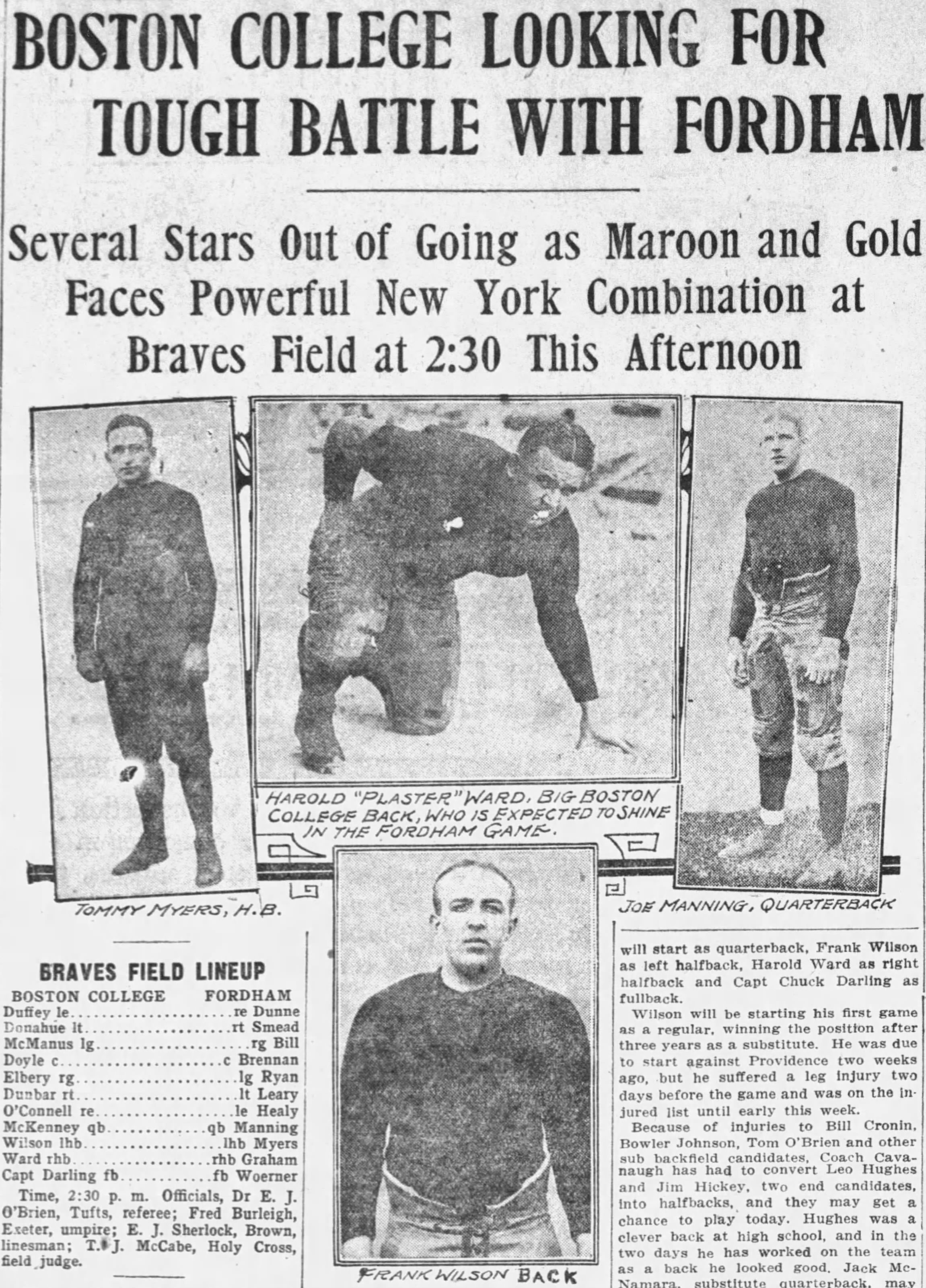
- Conference: Independent
- Record: 2-7
- Head coach: Frank Gargan (4th season)
- Captain: Louis Healey
- Home stadium: Fordham Field, Yankee Stadium

1923 Eastern college football independents records
	Conf.			Overall
Team	W	L	T	W		L		T
Cornell		–		8	–	0	–	0
Yale		–		8	–	0	–	0
St. John's		–		5	–	0	–	1
Dartmouth		–		8	–	1	–	0
Syracuse		–		8	–	1	–	0
Boston College		–		7	–	1	–	1
Rutgers		–		7	–	1	–	1
Washington & Jefferson		–		6	–	1	–	1
Holy Cross		–		8	–	2	–	0
Lafayette		–		6	–	1	–	2
Tufts		–		6	–	2	–	0
Army		–		6	–	2	–	1
Colgate		–		6	–	2	–	1
Geneva		–		6	–	2	–	1
Lehigh		–		6	–	2	–	1
NYU		–		6	–	2	–	1
Penn State		–		6	–	2	–	1
Vermont		–		6	–	3	–	1
Brown		–		6	–	4	–	0
Harvard		–		4	–	3	–	1
Carnegie Tech		–		4	–	3	–	1
Penn		–		5	–	4	–	0
Pittsburgh		–		5	–	4	–	0
Bucknell		–		4	–	4	–	1
Columbia		–		4	–	4	–	1
Duquesne		–		4	–	4	–	0
Princeton		–		3	–	3	–	1
Franklin & Marshall		–		3	–	5	–	1
Drexel		–		2	–	6	–	0
Buffalo		–		2	–	5	–	1
Fordham		–		2	–	7	–	0
Boston University		–		1	–	6	–	0
Villanova		–		0	–	7	–	1
Temple		–		0	–	5	–	0
CCNY		–		0	–	7	–	0
Springfield		–		0	–	7	–	0

The 1923 Fordham Maroon football team was an American football team that represented Fordham University as an independent during the 1923 college football season. In its fourth season, under coach Frank Gargan, Fordham compiled a 2–7 record.

== Schedule ==
Date	Time	Opponent	Site	Result	Attendance	Source
October 5		Mount St. Mary's	Bronx, NY	W 41–0		
October 12	2:30 p.m.	at Boston College	Braves Field; Boston, MA	L 0–20	18,000	
October 20		at Lehigh	Taylor Stadium; Bethlehem, PA	L 6–9		
October 27		vs. St. John's	Fordham Field; Bronx, NY	L 0–13		
November 6		vs. NYU	Yankee Stadium; Bronx, NY	L 0–20	10,000	
November 10		Holy Cross	Yankee Stadium; Bronx, NY	L 7–23		
November 17		CCNY	Fordham Field; Bronx, NY	W 30–0		
November 24		vs. Rutgers	Ashland Stadium; East Orange, NJ	L 0–42	5,000	
December 1		Georgetown	Yankee Stadium; Bronx, NY	L 0–6		
		Gallaudet		W 23–6		
		Mount St. Mary's		W 64–0		
