= Con O'Brien (American football) =

American football player (1898–1993)

Profile
- Position: Tackle

Personal information
- Born: May 8, 1898; Boston, Massachusetts, U.S.
- Died: December 1, 1993 (aged 95); Stoneham, Massachusetts, U.S.
- Listed height: 6 ft 2 in (1.88 m)
- Listed weight: 195 lb (88 kg)

Career information
- High school: Commerce (Boston, Massachusetts)
- College: Boston College, St. John's

Career history
- New York Brickley Giants (1921); Boston Bulldogs (1926)
- Stats at Pro Football Reference

Cornelius F. O'Brien (May 8, 1898 – December 1, 1993) was a professional American football and police officer. He played professionally as a Tackle in the American Professional Football Association (AFPA)—now known as the National Football League (NFL)—in 1921 with the New York Brickley Giants and in first American Football League (AFL) with the Boston Bulldogs in 1926.

O'Brien was born in Boston and played college football at Boston College. He also played at St. John's University in 1923. O'Brien served in the United States Army during World War I. He was a member of the Boston Police Department for 45 years. He reached the rank of captain before retiring in 1966. O'Brien died on December 1, 1993, of congestive heart failure, New England Memorial Hospital in Stoneham, Massachusetts.
