= 1923 Washington & Jefferson Presidents football team =

American college football season

1923 Washington & Jefferson Presidents football
- Conference: Independent
- Record: 6–1–1
- Head coach: John Heisman (1st season)

1923 Eastern college football independents records
	Conf.			Overall
Team	W	L	T	W		L		T
Cornell		–		8	–	0	–	0
Yale		–		8	–	0	–	0
St. John's		–		5	–	0	–	1
Dartmouth		–		8	–	1	–	0
Syracuse		–		8	–	1	–	0
Boston College		–		7	–	1	–	1
Rutgers		–		7	–	1	–	1
Washington & Jefferson		–		6	–	1	–	1
Holy Cross		–		8	–	2	–	0
Lafayette		–		6	–	1	–	2
Tufts		–		6	–	2	–	0
Army		–		6	–	2	–	1
Colgate		–		6	–	2	–	1
Geneva		–		6	–	2	–	1
Lehigh		–		6	–	2	–	1
NYU		–		6	–	2	–	1
Penn State		–		6	–	2	–	1
Vermont		–		6	–	3	–	1
Brown		–		6	–	4	–	0
Harvard		–		4	–	3	–	1
Carnegie Tech		–		4	–	3	–	1
Penn		–		5	–	4	–	0
Pittsburgh		–		5	–	4	–	0
Bucknell		–		4	–	4	–	1
Columbia		–		4	–	4	–	1
Duquesne		–		4	–	4	–	0
Princeton		–		3	–	3	–	1
Franklin & Marshall		–		3	–	5	–	1
Drexel		–		2	–	6	–	0
Buffalo		–		2	–	5	–	1
Fordham		–		2	–	7	–	0
Boston University		–		1	–	6	–	0
Villanova		–		0	–	7	–	1
Temple		–		0	–	5	–	0
CCNY		–		0	–	7	–	0
Springfield		–		0	–	7	–	0

The 1923 Washington & Jefferson Presidents football team was an American football team that represented Washington & Jefferson College as an independent during the 1923 college football season. The team compiled a 6–1–1 record. John Heisman was the head coach.

== Schedule ==
Date	Opponent	Site	Result	Attendance	Source
September 29	Bethany (WV)	Washington, PA	W 21–0		
October 6	Washington and Lee	College Field; Washington, PA	Canceled		
October 13	Brown	Washington, PA	W 12–7		
October 20	Carnegie Tech	Washington, PA	W 9–7		
October 27	at Detroit	University of Detroit Stadium; Detroit, MI	W 6–0		
November 3	vs. Lafayette	Polo Grounds; New York, NY	T 6–6		
November 10	Waynesburg	Washington, PA	W 40–0		
November 17	at Pittsburgh	Forbes Field; Pittsburgh, PA	L 6–13	31,000	
November 29	at West Virginia	Morgantown, WV	W 7–2	Athletic Field	
