= Skinny Johnson =

American basketball player and coach

Personal information
- Born: August 16, 1911 Oklahoma City, Oklahoma, U.S.
- Died: February 5, 1980 (aged 68) Oklahoma City, Oklahoma, U.S.
- Listed height: 6 ft 4 in (1.93 m)

Career information
- High school: Central (Oklahoma City, Oklahoma)
- College: Kansas (1930–1933)
- Position: Center

Career history
- ?–?: Southern Kansas Stage Lines

Career highlights
- AAU National champion (1935); First-team All-American – College Humor (1933); 2× First-team All-Big Six (1932, 1933); No. 33 jersey retired by Kansas Jayhawks
- Basketball Hall of Fame
- Collegiate Basketball Hall of Fame

William C. "Skinny" Johnson (August 16, 1911 – February 5, 1980) was an American basketball player during the 1930s. As a 6 feet 4 inches (193 cm) center Johnson was among the tallest players of his time. The Oklahoma City native attended the University of Kansas (1929–33), where he was a three-year letterwinner under coach Phog Allen. He was named First-Team Big Six Conference twice (1932, 1933) as well as Second-Team Big Six Conference (1931) once. During the 1930s he played amateur basketball with several AAU teams. He briefly coached collegiate basketball at Cleveland Chiropractic College (1937) in Kansas City, Missouri as well. On May 2, 1977, Johnson was inducted to the Naismith Memorial Basketball Hall of Fame as a player.
