= Kansas Jayhawks men's basketball =

University of Kansas team

2026–27 Kansas Jayhawks men's basketball team
- University: University of Kansas
- First season: 1898–99; 128 years ago
- Athletic director: Travis Goff
- Head coach: Bill Self; 24th season, 633–167 (.791)
- Location: Lawrence, Kansas
- Arena: Allen Fieldhouse (capacity: 15,300)
- NCAA division: Division I
- Conference: Big 12
- Nickname: Jayhawks
- Colors: Crimson and blue
- All-time record: 2,438–920 (.726)
- NCAA tournament record: 118–52 (.694)

NCAA Division I tournament champions
- 1952, 1988, 2008, 2022
Other NCAA Division I tournament results
Runner-up	1940, 1953, 1957, 1991, 2003, 2012
Final Four	1940, 1952, 1953, 1957, 1971, 1974, 1986, 1988, 1991, 1993, 2002, 2003, 2008, 2012, 2018*, 2022
Elite Eight	1940, 1942, 1952, 1953, 1957, 1960, 1966, 1971, 1974, 1986, 1988, 1991, 1993, 1996, 2002, 2003, 2004, 2007, 2008, 2011, 2012, 2016, 2017, 2018*, 2022
Sweet Sixteen	1952, 1953, 1957, 1960, 1966, 1967, 1971, 1974, 1981, 1986, 1987, 1988, 1991, 1993, 1994, 1995, 1996, 1997, 2001, 2002, 2003, 2004, 2007, 2008, 2009, 2011, 2012, 2013, 2016, 2017, 2018*, 2022
Appearances	1940, 1942, 1952, 1953, 1957, 1960, 1966, 1967, 1971, 1974, 1975, 1978, 1981, 1984, 1985, 1986, 1987, 1988, 1990, 1991, 1992, 1993, 1994, 1995, 1996, 1997, 1998, 1999, 2000, 2001, 2002, 2003, 2004, 2005, 2006, 2007, 2008, 2009, 2010, 2011, 2012, 2013, 2014, 2015, 2016, 2017, 2018*, 2019, 2021, 2022, 2023, 2024, 2025, 2026

Pre-tournament Helms national champions
- 1921–22, 1922–23

Conference tournament champions
- Big Eight: 1981, 1984, 1986, 1992 Big 12: 1997, 1998, 1999, 2006, 2007, 2008, 2010, 2011, 2013, 2016, 2018*, 2022

Conference regular-season champions
- MVIAA: 1908, 1909, 1910, 1911, 1912, 1914, 1915, 1922, 1923, 1924, 1925, 1926, 1927 Big Eight: 1931, 1932, 1933, 1934, 1936, 1937, 1938, 1940, 1941, 1942, 1943, 1946, 1950, 1952, 1953, 1954, 1957, 1960, 1966, 1967, 1971, 1974, 1975, 1978, 1986, 1991, 1992, 1993, 1995, 1996 Big 12: 1997, 1998, 2002, 2003, 2005, 2006, 2007, 2008, 2009, 2010, 2011, 2012, 2013, 2014, 2015, 2016, 2017, 2018*, 2020, 2022, 2023

Conference division champions
- MVIAA South: 1908, 1909, 1910, 1911, 1912, 1913, 1914, 1915

Uniforms
Home	Away	Alternate
- * vacated by NCAA

The Kansas Jayhawks men's basketball program is the intercollegiate men's basketball program of the University of Kansas. The program is classified in the NCAA's Division I and the team competes in the Big 12 Conference. Kansas is renowned for having the most prestigious and historic intercollegiate basketball program in North America. In the United States, Kansas has six overall national championships (four NCAA Tournament National Championships and two Helms National Championships), as well as being runner-up six times and having the most conference titles in college basketball history.

The Jayhawks own the NCAA record for most consecutive NCAA Tournament appearances with 36 consecutive appearances. Since the 1984 tournament, the Jayhawks have only missed the tournament once due to disciplinary action from the NCAA; they were ruled ineligible for the 1989 tournament. They have not missed the tournament strictly due to on the court performance since the 1983 tournament. They were also, along with Dartmouth, the first team to appear in multiple NCAA Tournaments after making their second appearance in the 1942 tournament. The Jayhawks had been ranked in the AP poll for 231 consecutive polls, a streak that had stretched from the poll released on February 2, 2009, through the poll released on February 8, 2021, which is the longest streak in AP poll history. Of the 28 seasons the Big 12 conference has been in existence, Kansas has won at least a share of 21 regular-season conference titles.

The Jayhawks' first coach was the inventor of basketball, James Naismith. Naismith, ironically, is the only coach in Kansas basketball history with a losing record. The Kansas basketball program has produced many notable professional players, including Clyde Lovellette, Wilt Chamberlain, Jo Jo White, Danny Manning, Raef LaFrentz, Paul Pierce, Nick Collison, Kirk Hinrich, Mario Chalmers, Andrew Wiggins, Joel Embiid, and Johnny Furphy. Politician Bob Dole also played basketball at Kansas. Former players who have gone on to be coaches include Phog Allen, Adolph Rupp, Dean Smith, Dutch Lonborg, and former assistants to go on to be notable coaches include John Calipari, Gregg Popovich, and Bill Self. Mark Turgeon, Jerod Haase, Danny Manning, and Tad Boyle are all former players and assistant coaches that became head coaches. Allen founded the National Association of Basketball Coaches and, with Lonborg, was an early proponent of the NCAA tournament. Four different Jayhawk head coaches are in the Naismith Memorial Basketball Hall of Fame as coaches, Phog Allen, Larry Brown, Roy Williams, and current head coach Bill Self. Three different Division I basketball arenas have been named after former Kansas players, the Dean Smith Center named after Dean Smith at North Carolina, Rupp Arena named after Adolph Rupp at Kentucky, and the Jayhawks’ own arena Allen Fieldhouse named after Phog Allen.

In 2008, ESPN ranked Kansas second on a list of the most prestigious programs of the modern college basketball era. Kansas currently has the longest streak of consecutive NCAA tournament appearances of all-time (28), the longest current streak of consecutive NCAA winning seasons (41), the most winning seasons in Division I history (105), the most non-losing seasons (.500 or better) in NCAA history (107), the most conference championships in Division I history (63), tied for the most consecutive regular-season conference titles in Division I (13), the most First-Team All-Americans in Division I history (24), and the most First-Team All-American selections in Division I history (31). As of the last complete season, the program ranks third in Division I all-time winning percentage (.729) and second in Division I all-time wins (2,393).

Since the opening of Allen Fieldhouse, the Jayhawks’ home arena, in 1955, the Jayhawks have earned a well established home court advantage. Allen Fieldhouse is often considered one of the best home court advantages in college basketball. As of 2024, the Jayhawks have won over 87 percent of their games in the 69-year history of Allen Fieldhouse, losing just 118 games. Under current head coach Bill Self, the Jayhawks have had three home court winning streaks over 30 games and two over 50 games. In addition to Allen Fieldhouse, the Jayhawks frequently play games at the nearby T-Mobile Center (formerly Sprint Center) in Kansas City, Missouri. These games, while technically at a neutral site, are officially considered home games when not part of a tournament, the only exception being their games at the arena during their six-game series with rival Missouri.

== History ==
Kansas currently ranks second all-time in NCAA Division I wins with 2,357 wins (as of the last complete season), against 877 losses (.729 all time winning %, third all-time). This record includes a 765–110 (.874) mark at historic Allen Fieldhouse. The Jayhawks are first in NCAA history with 98 winning seasons, and tied for first in NCAA history with 101 non-losing (.500 or better) seasons with Kentucky. Kansas is tied for the fewest head coaches (eight) of any program that has played since the 19th century, yet has reached the Final Four under more head coaches (six) than any other program in the nation. Every head coach at Kansas since the inception of the NCAA Tournament has led the program to the Final Four. Kansas has had four head coaches inducted into the Naismith Hall of Fame, more than any other program in the nation. A perennial conference powerhouse, Kansas leads Division I all-time in regular season conference titles with 62 in 113 years of conference play (the MVIAA Conference was created in 1907) through the 2019–20 regular season. The Jayhawks have won a record 20 conference titles and a record 11 conference tournament titles in the 24 years of the Big 12's existence. The program also owns the best Big 12 records in both the regular season and the post season conference tournament, with a 412–102 record in conference play and a 46–12 record in tournament play. The Jayhawks won their 2,000th game in school history when they defeated Texas Tech in the 2009–2010 season, joining the University of Kentucky and the University of North Carolina as the only schools to boast such an achievement at that time.

=== James Naismith era (1898–1907) ===
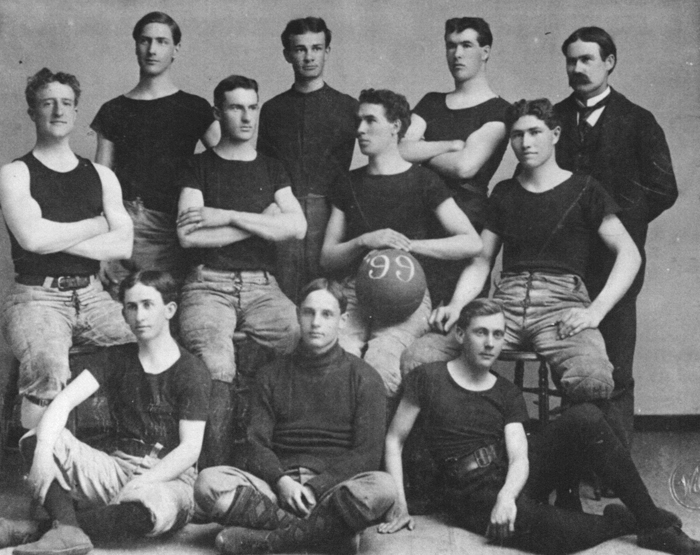
The 1899 University of Kansas basketball team, with Dr. James Naismith at the back right

The men's basketball program officially began in 1898, following the arrival of Dr. James Naismith to the school, just six years after Naismith had written the sport's first official rules. Naismith was initially hired to be a chapel director and physical education instructor, but became the head basketball coach.

The Jayhawks played their first game on February 3, 1899, against the Kansas City YMCA, a game they lost 5–16. They would win their first game a week later on February 10 in a 31–6 victory over the Topeka YMCA. Their first intercollegiate game was played on March 23 against Haskell, a school about two miles southeast of the southeastern edge of the University of Kansas. They would finish their first season 7–4.

During the programs early years, the majority of the university's basketball games were played against nearby YMCA teams, with YMCAs across the nation having played an integral part in the birth of basketball. Other common opponents were Haskell and William Jewell. Under Naismith, the team began their rivalries with Kansas State, later deemed the Sunflower Showdown and Missouri, later deemed the Border War (officially changed to Border Showdown in 2004). Naismith was, ironically, the only coach in the program's history to have a losing record (55–60).

Including his years as coach, Naismith served as the athletic director and a faculty member at Kansas for a total of almost 40 years before retiring in 1937. Naismith died in 1939, and his remains are buried in Lawrence, Kansas. The basketball court in Allen Fieldhouse is named James Naismith Court. Beyond inventing the game, his next greatest basketball legacy may be his coaching tree, whose two trunks are the well-known Phog Allen and Kansas native John McLendon. (McLendon attended KU in the 1930s when Allen was head coach. Although McLendon tried out for the team, he never played for Allen. Naismith mentored McLendon from his arrival at Kansas through degree completion and beyond.)

In October 2010, lifelong Kansas basketball fan Josh Swade went on a mission to raise money to win James Naismith's original rules of basketball, which were put up for auction. Swade met Kansas alumnus David Booth who on December 10, 2010, purchased Dr. James Naismith's 13 original rules of the game at a Sotheby's auction in New York City for the sum of $4.3 million. The story was told in a documentary film called There's No Place Like Home, which was part of ESPN's 30 for 30 series. The founding document of basketball was brought back to KU's Lawrence campus, where it is currently housed at the DeBruce Center.

=== Phog Allen/William O. Hamilton era (1907–1956) ===
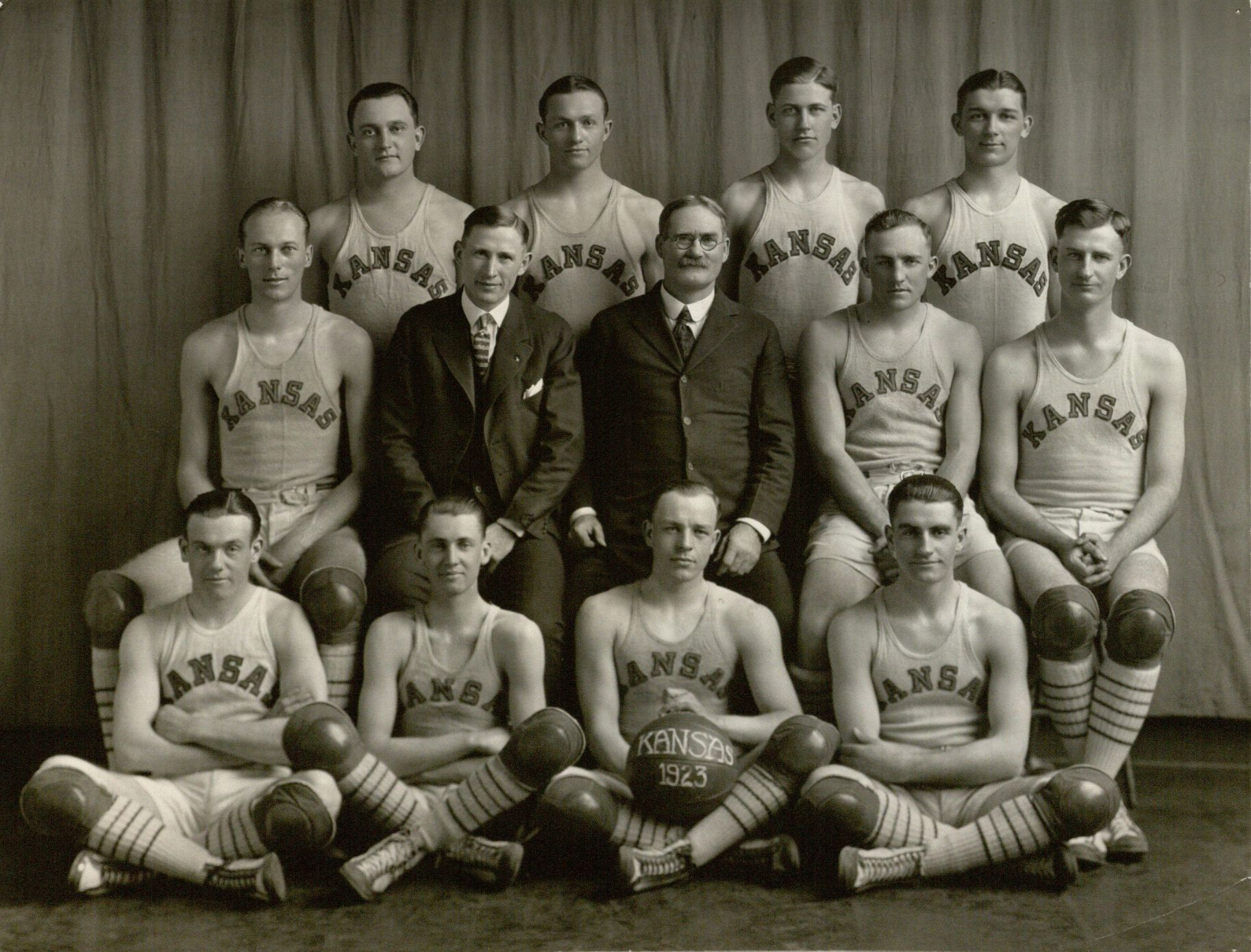
The 1923 Helms National Championship team. In the center is head coach Phog Allen and inventor of the game Dr. James Naismith

In 1907, one of Naismith's former players, Dr. Forrest C. "Phog" Allen, was hired as head coach. Naismith reportedly and infamously told Allen: "You can't coach basketball; you just play it." Allen became one of the sport's most influential coaches, and is often referred to as the "father of basketball coaching", because of his impact on development of basketball coaching and mentorship to well-respected names, including National Basketball Hall of Fame coaches Adolph Rupp, Dean Smith, Dutch Lonborg and Ralph Miller (all except Lonborg being born and raised in Kansas).

Allen coached the team from 1907 to 1909 before William O. Hamilton took over from 1909 to 1919, with Allen returning in 1919. Under Hamilton's leadership, the team went 125–59 and won five conference championships.

Allen coached KU for 39 seasons and amassed a record of 590–219, with two retroactively-awarded Helms Foundation national titles and one NCAA Tournament championship in 1952. Numerous basketball greats played at Kansas during Allen's era, including Dean Smith, Adolph Rupp, Dutch Lonborg, and Ralph Miller (all future Hall of Fame coaches), Paul Endacott, Bill Johnson, and Clyde Lovellette (Hall of Fame players), two-time Olympic gold medalist Bill Hougland, and former United States Senate Majority Leader Bob Dole.

In 1952, the Jayhawks won the national title with an 80–63 victory in the final game over St. John's, coached by Frank McGuire. Clyde Lovellette of Kansas was named the tournament's Most Outstanding Player, and is still the only player to lead the nation in scoring and lead his team to a national title in the same year. This tournament was the first to have a true "Final Four" format. Seven members of the championship team represented the United States in the 1952 Summer Olympics and brought home a gold medal for the national basketball team. This was especially poignant for Allen, as he had been the driving force for having basketball added to the Olympics in 1936. Allen was forced to retire when he turned 70 in 1956, because of a university policy requiring school employees to retire at 70. Allen had recruited legendary Wilt Chamberlain to Kansas, but would not get to coach him because freshmen were not eligible to play varsity basketball in 1956.

=== Dick Harp era (1956–1964) ===
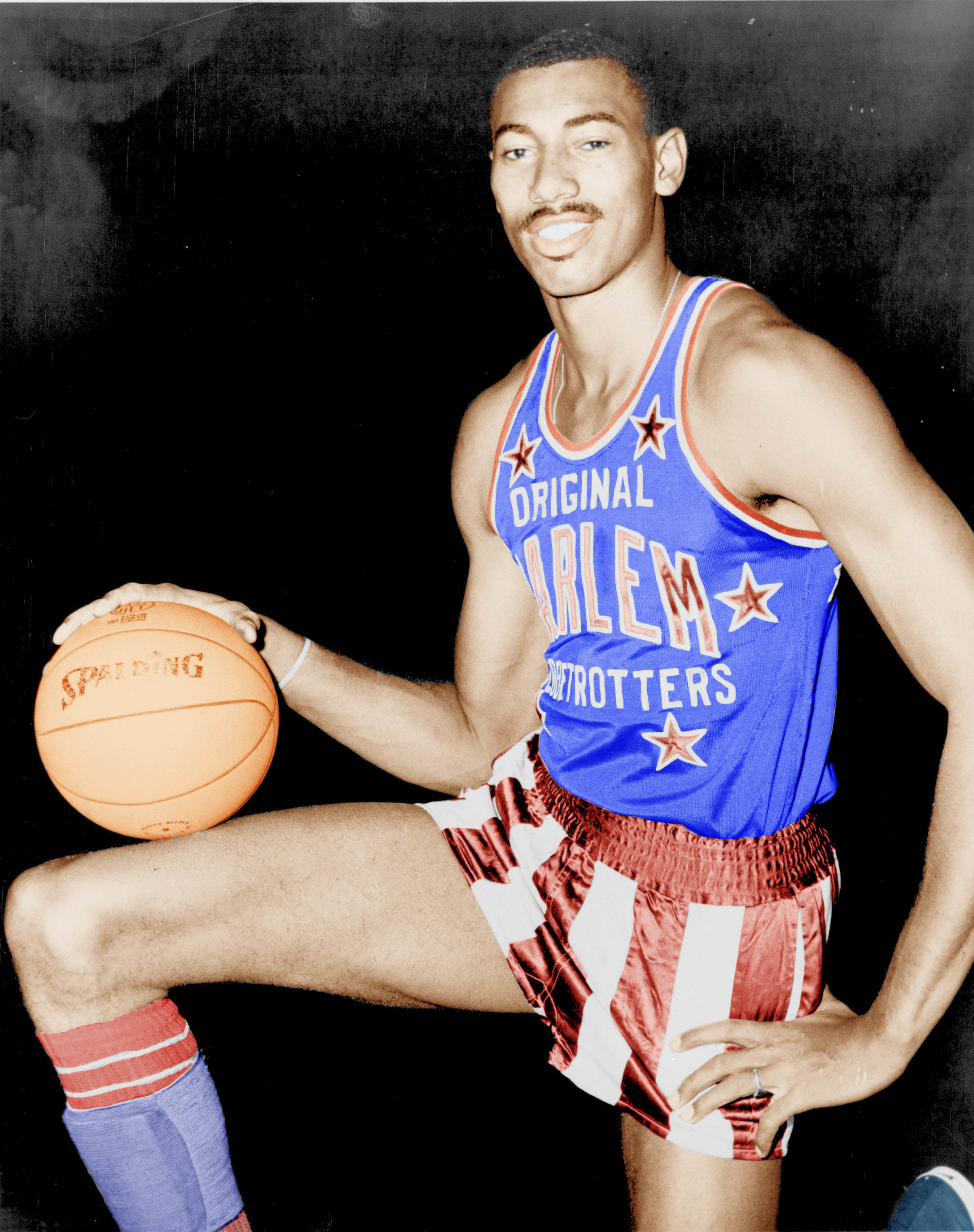
Wilt Chamberlain was one of the top centers to ever play for the Jayhawks.

Following Allen's retirement, the Jayhawks hired former KU player and assistant, Dick Harp. Under Harp the Jayhawks went 121–82 with two conference titles and two NCAA tournament berths.

Wilt Chamberlain played his varsity years under Harp, making his job a rather easy one for the first two seasons. In his first varsity game, Chamberlain scored 52 points and grabbed 31 rebounds, breaking both all-time college records in an 87–69 win against Northwestern. In 1957, he led the Jayhawks to the championship game against North Carolina, coached by Frank McGuire, whom they had defeated in the 1952 title game when McGuire was at St. John's. McGuire triple-teamed Chamberlain and, as a result, KU was defeated 54–53 in triple overtime. The game is considered one of the greatest in NCAA history. Chamberlain continued to average 30+ points per game until leaving KU early to play professionally with the Harlem Globetrotters.

=== Ted Owens era (1964–1983) ===
Ted Owens took over for Harp in 1964, and would go 348–128 during his tenure, eventually winning six Big Eight Conference titles.

The team advanced to NCAA postseason play seven times under Owens. The 1971 team went 27–3 and advanced to the Final Four before losing to UCLA. In 1974 the team went 23–7 and again advanced to the Final Four before losing to Marquette.

During this era the program produced All-Americans such as Jo Jo White, Walt Wesley, Bud Stallworth, Darnell Valentine, and Dave Robisch.

After 19 years of coaching at University of Kansas, Owens was fired following the 1982–83 season after the Jayhawks posted back-to-back losing seasons.

=== Larry Brown era (1983–1988) ===
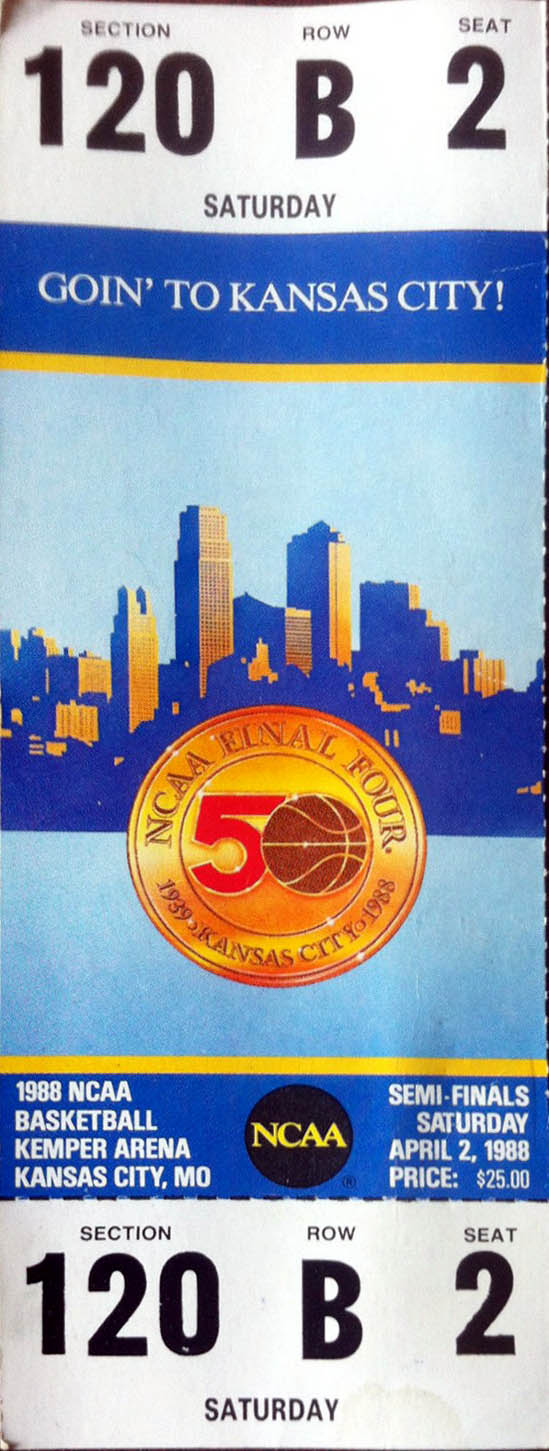
Brown helped lead Kansas to the school's second-ever NCAA Tournament championship in 1988.

In 1983, Larry Brown headed to the University of Kansas, after coaching in the NBA. Under Brown, Kansas finished first in the Big Eight in 1986, and second in 1984, 1985, and 1987. In 1988, Kansas got off to a 12–8 start, including 1–4 in the Big 8. The Jayhawks' 55-game homecourt winning streak in Allen Fieldhouse was snapped with a loss to rival Kansas State, and they would also lose two more home games to Duke and Oklahoma. Behind the high-scoring of Danny Manning, KU finished 21–11 at the end of the season and entered the NCAA tournament as a #6 seed. Two early upsets allowed them to face lower seeds, gain momentum, and advance. The Jayhawks would ultimately go on to face the three teams who had given them their three home losses that season. They defeated rival Kansas State in the Elite 8, then defeated Duke in the Final 4, and won the national championship, defeating favored conference rival Oklahoma 83–79 in the final. The 11 losses Kansas accrued in 1988 are more than any other national champion have before or since. The win garnered the team the nickname "Danny and the Miracles". Earlier, near the start of the tournament, Dick Vitale had been asked about Kansas's chances and commented "If Kansas wins, I'll kiss the Jayhawk on the floor of Allen Fieldhouse." Eventually, he did make good on his promise.

During Brown's tenure, Kansas had five NCAA Tournament appearances, which included two second round appearances, one Sweet 16 appearance, two trips to the Final Four and the national championship. He also compiled a 135–44 (.754) overall record. Brown left under a cloud, as NCAA sanctions and a postseason probation were levied against Kansas following Brown's departure in the 1988–1989 season as a result of recruiting violations that took place during Brown's tenure. The major violation was a plane ticket home for potential transfer Vincent Askew to see his sick grandmother. Prior to the investigation, Askew had already decided not to transfer to Kansas.

=== Roy Williams era (1988–2003) ===
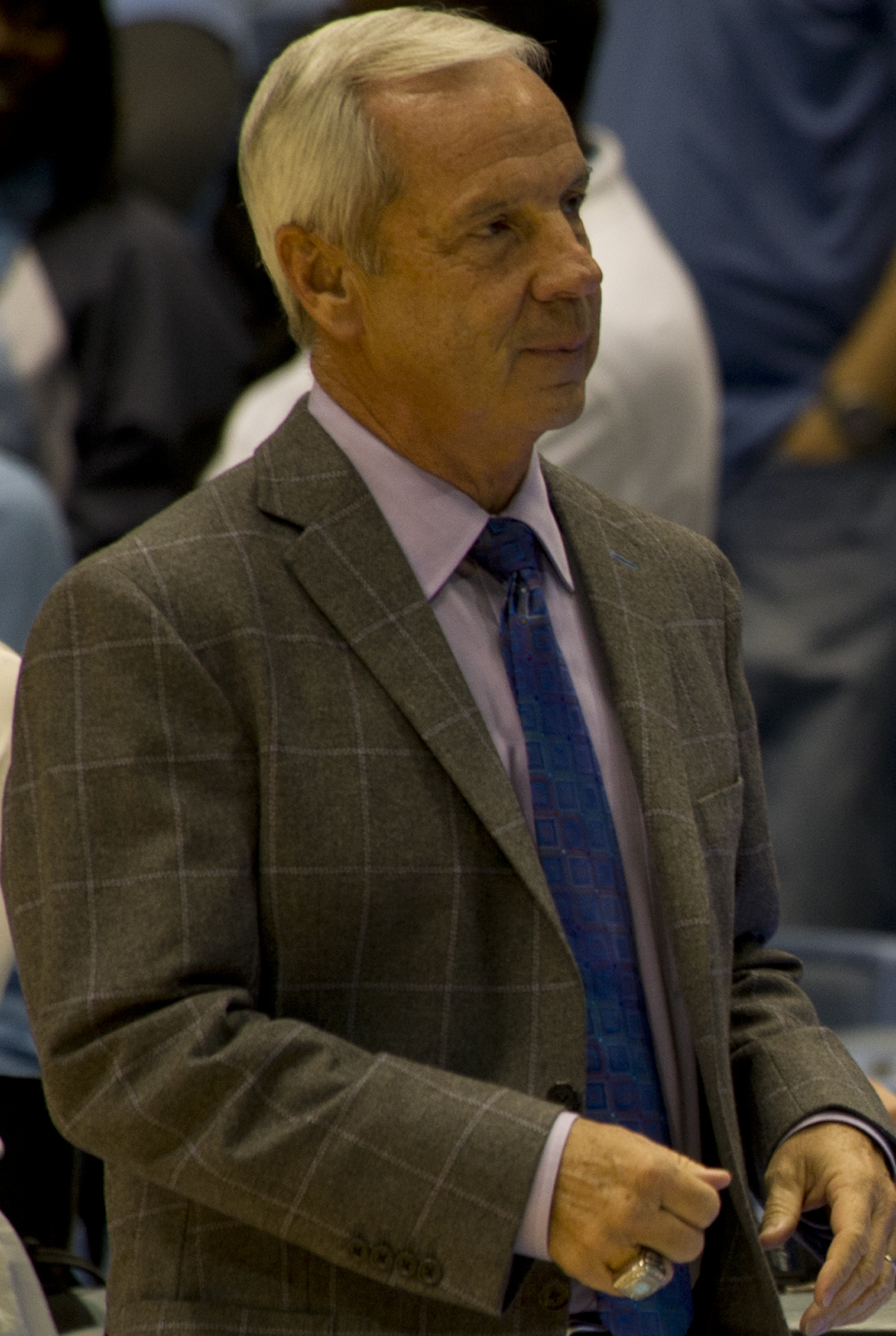
As of 2025, Roy Williams has the highest win-loss percentage of any longtime Kansas head basketball coach (.805). Not once did Williams' Jayhawks miss the NCAA Division I tournament from 1990 to 2003.

Shortly following Brown's departure, Kansas hired then North Carolina assistant Roy Williams as head coach.

From 1988 to 2003, under the direction of Williams, the Jayhawks had a record of 418–101, a .805 winning percentage. Williams' Kansas teams averaged 27.8 wins per season. Except for his first season at Kansas (when the team was on probation), all of Williams' teams made the NCAA tournament. On Roy's first KU team Patrick Richey, Adonis Jordan and Richard Scott could not visit campus because of recruiting violations by Larry Brown, so they committed sight unseen. From 1990 to 1999 Kansas compiled a 286–60 record, giving them both the most wins and best winning percentage of any team in that decade. From 1994 to 1998, the Jayhawks won 62 consecutive home games at Allen Fieldhouse, which was the longest such streak in the NCAA at the time. The seniors of 1998 (Raef LaFrentz, Billy Thomas, and C.B. McGrath) went 58–0 at home during their KU careers.

Kansas won nine regular-season conference championships over Williams' last 13 years. In seven years of Big 12 Conference play, his teams went 94–18, capturing the regular-season title in 1997, 1998, 2002 and 2003 and the postseason tournament crown in 1997, 1998 and 1999. In 2001–02, KU became the first, and so far only, team to go undefeated (16–0) in Big 12 play. From 1995 to 1998, Kansas was a combined 123–17 – an average of 30.8 wins per season. Williams' teams went 201–17 (.922) in Allen Fieldhouse, and won 62 consecutive games in Allen from February 1994 to December 1998. Kansas was a regular in the Associated Press Top 25 from 1991 to 1999, placing in the poll for 145 consecutive weeks. Williams' teams were ranked in the Top 10 in 194 AP polls from 1990.

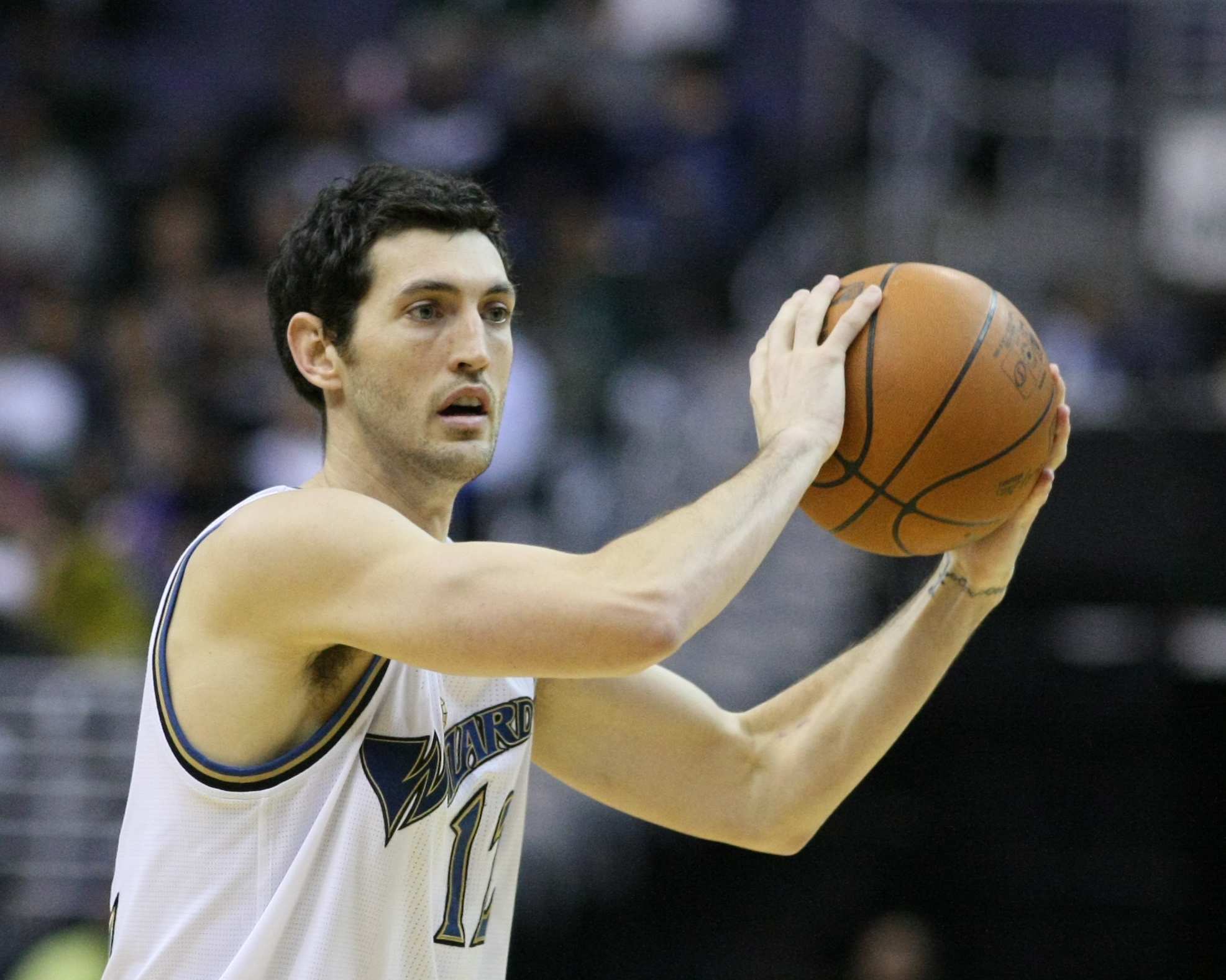
Kirk Hinrich led the Jayhawks to back-to-back Final Four appearances in 2002 and 2003 under Roy Williams. Hinrich, along with Nick Collison and Keith Langford, reached the 2003 National Championship, which they lost to Syracuse

Kansas led the nation in field goal percentage and scoring in 2002 and in scoring margin in 2003, held opponents to the lowest field goal percentage in the country in 2001 (37.8 percent), and led the nation in winning percentage in 1997 and 2002. The team shot better than 50 percent from the floor for seven different seasons under Williams and led the country in field goal percentage in 1990 (53.3) and 2002 (50.6). Williams' teams shot a combined 49.4 percent from the floor during his tenure. Williams-coached teams led the nation in assists in 2001 and 2002 and were seventh in the nation in 2003; scored 100 or more points 71 times (once every 13 games); averaged 82.7 points per game over his 15 seasons as coach; and averaged 90 or more points per game in two seasons (92.1 in 1990 and 90.9 in 2002).

The Jayhawks were in the AP Top 25 in 242 of 268 weekly polls, reached the No. 1 ranking in the country in six different seasons, and reached at least No. 2 in the nation in 11 of William's 15 seasons as head coach at Kansas.

Under Williams, the team had several deep runs in the NCAA Tournament, making it to four Final Fours and appearing in the national championship game in both 1991 and 2003, losing both, to Duke and Syracuse respectively. Amid the tournament successes, there were plenty of woes. The 1996–97 team was said by many to be one of the greatest teams in history, featuring future NBA players such as Paul Pierce, Jacque Vaughn, Raef LaFrentz, Greg Orstertag, and Scot Pollard. The team was upset in the Sweet Sixteen by the eventual champion, Arizona Wildcats.

The Jayhawks advanced to the Final Four in 2002 & 2003. Following the national championship loss in 2003, Williams left Kansas and returned to coach at his alma mater, North Carolina.

=== Bill Self era (2003–present) ===
Bill Self was introduced as the new head coach for the 2003–04 season and in his first season at Kansas, Self inherited Williams' players and recruits, which often caused turmoil as the style of play differed between the two coaches. Nevertheless, Self led his new Kansas team to the Elite Eight at the NCAA tournament his first year.

KU in 2004–05 was led by seniors Wayne Simien, Keith Langford, Michael Lee, and Aaron Miles. They began the season ranked #1 and started off 20–1, but then they slumped and lost six of their final nine games, including a loss to Bucknell in the first round of the NCAA Tournament. The team finished 23–7 and settled for a Big 12 co-championship with Oklahoma.

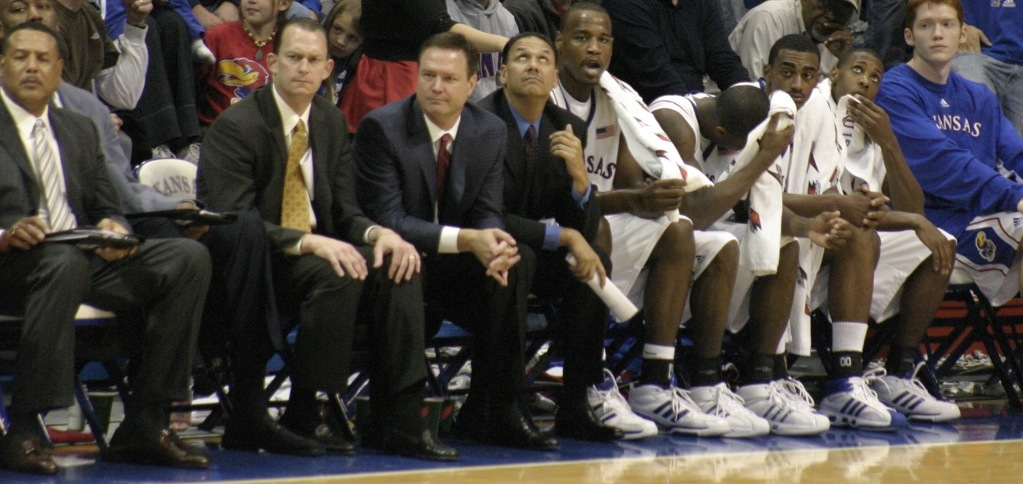
Coach Bill Self (third from left) with his national champion 2007–08 squad

In 2005–06, little was expected of the freshman/sophomore-dominated Jayhawks, and they began the season 10–6, including 1–2 in the Big 12. Although they did post a 73–46 win over Kentucky, they also saw the end of their 31-game winning streak over rival Kansas State with a 59–55 loss at Allen Fieldhouse, and two nights later blew a seven-point lead in the final 45 seconds of regulation en route to an 89–86 overtime loss at Missouri. But afterward, the Jayhawks matured rapidly, winning 15 of their final 17 games and avenging the losses to both Kansas State and Missouri. KU played as the #2 seed in the Big 12 Tournament in Dallas, and avenged an earlier loss to Texas with an 80–68 victory over the Longhorns in the final to clinch the tournament championship and the highlight win of the season. KU was handed a #4 seed for the NCAA Tournament but stumbled again in the first round with a loss to the Bradley Braves.

In the 2006–07 season, Self led Kansas to the 2007 Big 12 regular-season championship with a 14–2 record, highlighted by beating the Kevin Durant-led Texas Longhorns in come-from-behind victories in the last game of the regular season and in the Big 12 Championship game. At the end of the regular season, Kansas stood at 27–4 and ranked #2 in the nation in both the AP and coaches' polls. Kansas received a number 1 seed in the NCAA tournament, but their tournament run ended in the Elite Eight with a loss to 2-seed UCLA.

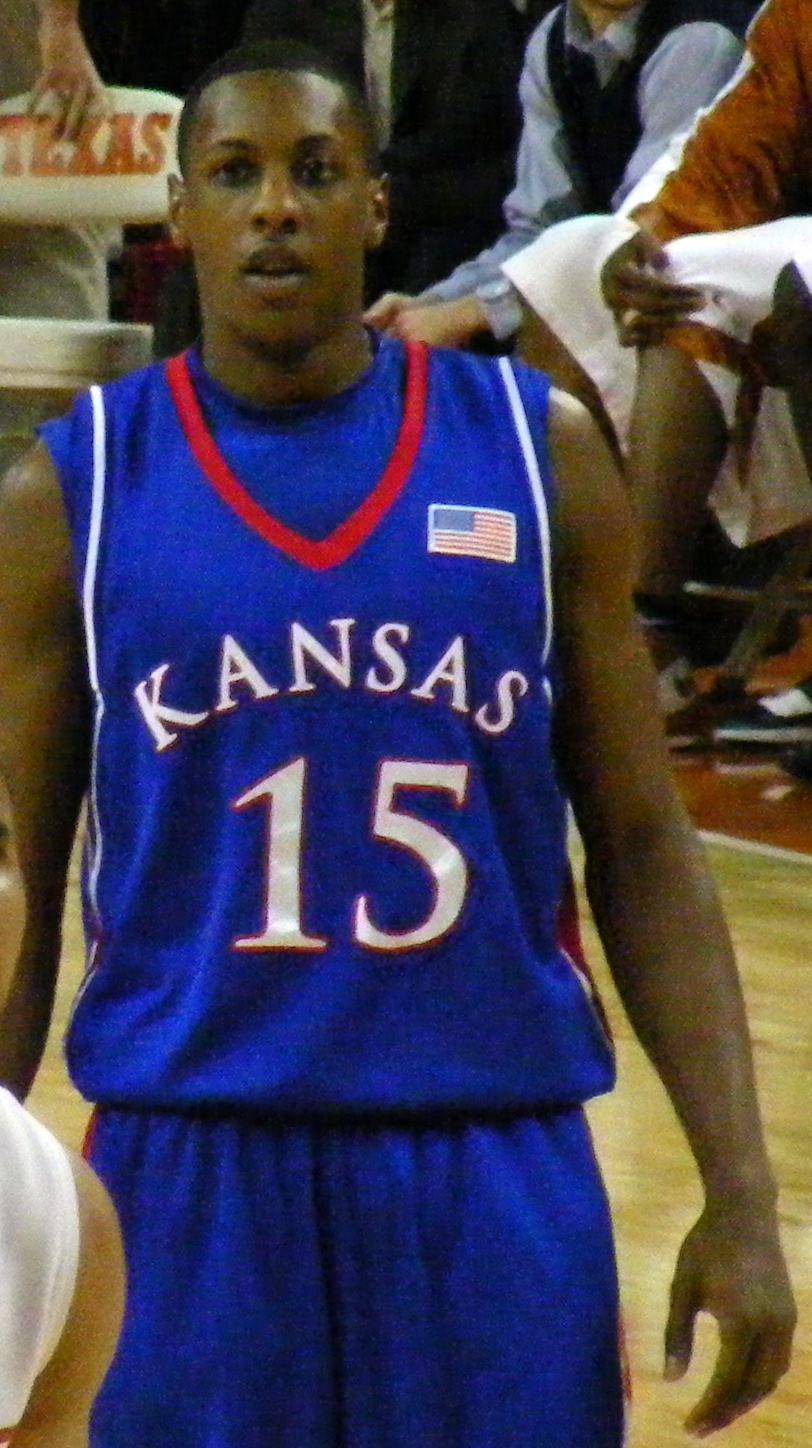
Mario Chalmers with the Jayhawks in February 2008

In the 2007–08 season, Self's Kansas team began the season 20–0 until they suffered their first loss at rival Kansas State, their first loss at Kansas State since 1983. The 2008 Jayhawks won the Big 12 regular-season title and the Big 12 conference tourney. They received a number-one seeding in the NCAA tournament in the Midwest region. On March 30, 2008, Self led Kansas to a win in an Elite Eight game over upstart Davidson College. KU won by two, 59–57. The Jayhawks played overall number 1 tournament seed North Carolina in the semifinals, a team coached by former KU head man Roy Williams. The Jayhawks opened the game with a 40–12 run over the first 12½ minutes before finally defeating them 84–66. On April 7, 2008, the Jayhawks triumphed over a one-loss Memphis team to claim the national title. With only seconds on the clock, Sherron Collins drove the ball the length of the court and threaded a pass to Mario Chalmers, who connected on a deep three-pointer to force overtime. This shot would later come to be known as "Mario's Miracle" in a nod to 1988 championship nickname "Danny and the Miracles". Kansas then outplayed Memphis in the overtime to win the NCAA Championship game, 75–68. The Jayhawks finished the season with a 37–3 record, the winningest season in Kansas history.

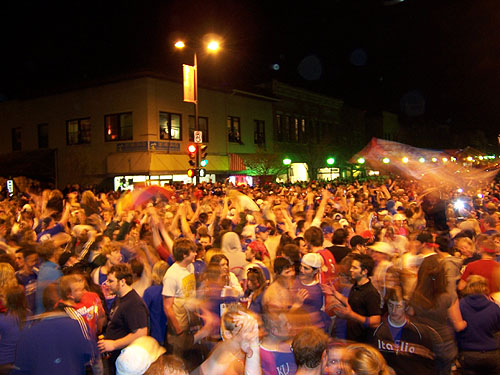
Kansas fans celebrating in Downtown Lawrence after the Jayhawks win the 2008 National Championship

In the 2008–09 season, despite losing seven of their top nine scorers and the entire starting line-up, the Jayhawks earned their 20th consecutive NCAA tournament bid after going 25–7 (14–2), winning the conference regular season title and extending their home winning streak to 41 straight at Allen Fieldhouse. On March 22, 2009, Kansas defeated Dayton, advancing to their 3rd consecutive Sweet 16 appearance. But the Jayhawks' season ended on March 27 when Michigan State came from behind in the final minute to defeat Kansas 67–62, ending their year at 27–8. Coach Self's record, after 6 seasons with the Jayhawks, was 169–40, an .809 percentage. After the season, Self was named National Coach of the Year by the Associated Press, CBS Sports' Chevrolet Award, USBWA (Henry Iba Award), and Sporting News.

On April 13, Sherron Collins and Cole Aldrich announced their intent to return for the 2009–10 season. On April 23, top high school recruit Xavier Henry made his commitment to play at Kansas in the fall, prompting ESPN to name the Jayhawks as "the team to beat in 2009–10." By the time the fall of 2009 arrived, Kansas was the unanimous preseason #1 team in all major publications. The Jayhawks finished the regular season with a 29–2 record and continue to hold the Division I record for the current consecutive home winning streak at 59 straight games in Allen Fieldhouse. Kansas passed 2,000 all-time wins in the 2009–10 season, only the third school to do so (finishing the season with a total of 2,003 all-time victories). They won the Big 12 tournament on March 13, clinching their 21st consecutive NCAA tournament appearance, an active NCAA record. However, despite being named the overall #1 seed in the tournament, the Jayhawks fell in the second round to #9-seeded Northern Iowa, finishing the season at 33–3.

Recruiting began immediately for the 2010–11 season, as Kansas landed the nation's top recruit Josh Selby in April. By September 2010, both The Sporting News and Athlon Sports had ranked Kansas in their pre-season outlook as #4 overall and, along with ESPN's Joe Lunardi, were projected to become a #1 seed again in the 2011 NCAA Tournament, which they would again earn. Blue Ribbon and the USA Today/ESPN coaches polls both placed Kansas at #7 in the pre-season poll. Josh Selby, became eligible and joined the Jayhawk line-up on December 18. On March 5, the Jayhawks beat Missouri 70–66 to clinch the Big 12 regular-season title for the 7th consecutive time and later went on to finish 29–2 during the regular season, ranked #2 in both the AP Poll and the USA Today/ESPN Coaches Poll. Bill Self was named Big 12 Coach of the Year and Marcus Morris was named Big 12 Player of the Year. The Jayhawks defeated 16 seed Boston University, 9 seed Illinois and 12 seed Richmond to reach their 3rd Elite Eight in the past five seasons before falling to 11 seed Virginia Commonwealth University in the quarterfinal game. During the season, Kansas moved past North Carolina as the 2nd winningest basketball program in history.

After being considered the top team but falling short in both of the previous two seasons, Kansas lost six of their top 8 scorers for the 2011–12 season. The Jayhawks had to rebuild after winning seven straight Big 12 titles. Prior to the season, the NCAA declared that three of the Jayhawks top recruits were ineligible for the season, which included games against perennial powerhouse programs such as Kentucky, Duke, Ohio State, and Georgetown. Despite 7 games against top 10 ranked opponents, Kansas finished the regular season 26–5, earned their 8th consecutive Big 12 title, and advanced to their 14th Final Four in school history. The Jayhawks faced another 2 seed, the Ohio State Buckeyes, in the National Semifinals, and came back from a 13-point first-half deficit to win the game, 64–62. They then faced the Kentucky Wildcats, who had beaten the Louisville Cardinals on the other side of the bracket, in the championship game. Kansas lost to the Wildcats, 67–59.

Kansas entered the 2012–13 season with eight straight Big 12 titles in tow. They ended the season having won 107 of their last 109 games at home. After scoring their ninth consecutive title and winning the Big 12 tournament championship by defeating rival Kansas State for the third time that season, KU set its sights on a sixth national title. They were seeded #1 in the South bracket, defeating Western Kentucky and North Carolina before losing in overtime to Michigan 87–85 in the Sweet 16.

With star freshmen Andrew Wiggins and Joel Embiid on the roster, Kansas entered the 2013–14 season as the #5 team in the country. They started off well with five straight wins, including a victory over Duke in the Champions' Classic. However, the team went 4–4 over its next eight games, including back-to-back losses to Colorado and Florida and an ugly home loss to San Diego State. The team recovered from this rough stretch and began Big 12 play with seven straight wins, ultimately finishing 14–4 to win its 10th consecutive Big 12 title. A back injury to Joel Embiid, however, left the Jayhawks vulnerable on their interior defense, and they fizzled out at season's end with four losses in their final seven games, including a loss to Iowa State in the Big 12 Tournament quarterfinals in Kansas City and an NCAA Tournament Round of 32 loss to Stanford to end the year. Kansas concluded the year 25–10, the first ten-loss season for Kansas since Roy Williams' 1999–2000 Jayhawks went 24–10.

After the exodus of Andrew Wiggins and Joel Embiid to the NBA draft, the Jayhawks reloaded with freshmen Kelly Oubre Jr. and Cliff Alexander, the Jayhawks looked poised for another Big 12 season title, which would be their 11th straight. After a loss in the Champions Classic to Kentucky, the Jayhawks finished 11–2 in the non-conference. In what many regarded as the toughest conference in the nation (Big 12) the Jayhawks won their 11th straight title outright with a record of 13–5, having lost a strong post presence in Cliff Alexander due to an investigation by the NCAA of improper benefits being given to Alexander. Evidence never clearly materialized, but Alexander was held out and played his last game as a Jayhawk at Kansas State, where they lost by 7. They then lost in the Big 12 Championship game to Iowa State 70–66, and had a final record going into the tournament of 26–8. The Jayhawks were given a 2 seed in the NCAA Tournament, where they ousted 15 seed New Mexico State by 19 points, but exited the tournament early at the hands of Wichita State by 13 points. Both Oubre Jr. and Alexander declared for the draft shortly after the conclusion of the NCAA tournament.

The 2015–16 Jayhawks, led by Perry Ellis and Frank Mason, won a 12th consecutive Big 12 title and won the Big 12 Tournament. Seeded #1 in the NCAA South Region, the Jayhawks reached the Elite Eight, where they stumbled against #2 seed Villanova, the eventual national champions.

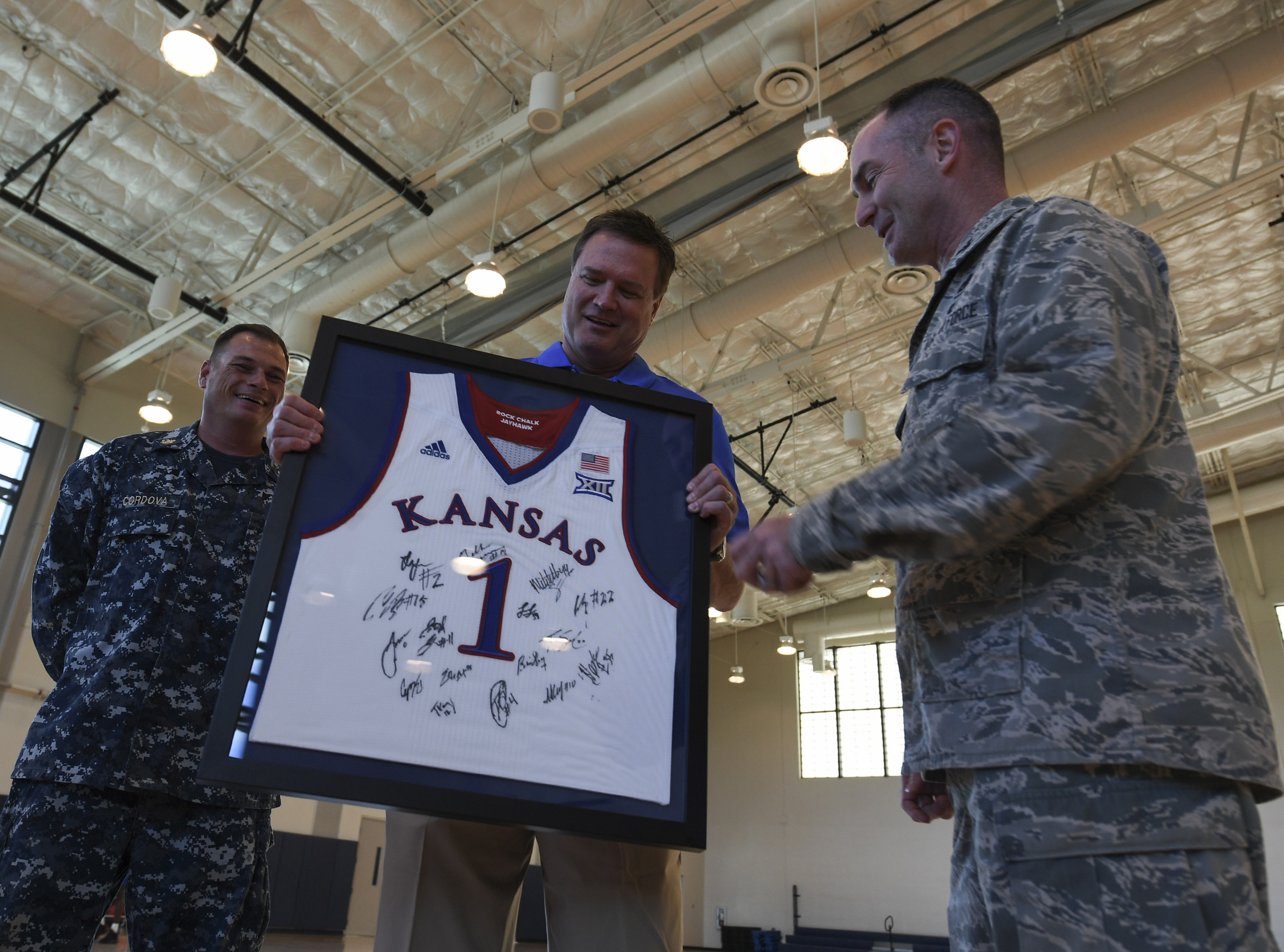
Bill Self at the Armed Forces Classic in 2016

In 2016–17, behind the leadership of national player of the year Frank Mason, the Jayhawks won a 13th consecutive Big 12 title, tying UCLA's record for most consecutive conference titles. Although the team made an early exit from the Big 12 Tournament with a quarterfinal loss to TCU, the Jayhawks got the #1 seed in the NCAA Midwest Region. They dominated UC-Davis, Michigan State, and Purdue in their first three games, but ran into a buzzsaw against Oregon in the Elite Eight.

The 2017–18 Jayhawks lost a number of players to graduation, the NBA Draft, and transfer; but appeared to be poised for another spectacular season. Star freshman Billy Preston was sidelined by an NCAA inquiry into the financial picture surrounding his car, and ultimately left the team to play professional basketball in Europe. Kansas won its first seven games before losing in Kansas City to Washington and at home to Arizona State. Kansas would lose a total of three home games during the season, the most for any Bill Self-coached Kansas team, and the most since losing three home games in the 1998–99 season. The season bottomed out in early February with a home loss to Oklahoma State and a 16-point loss at Baylor. But Kansas rallied to win a 14th straight Big 12 title, breaking UCLA's record. Then they defeated West Virginia to win the Big 12 Tournament. Seeded #1 in the NCAA Midwest Region, the Jayhawks defeated Penn, Seton Hall, Clemson, and Duke to reach Bill Self's third Final Four appearance and the program's 15th overall. However, they stumbled against Villanova for the second time in three years. As with their last outing, Villanova wound up as the college champions. On October 11, 2023, the NCAA would rule that Kansas would vacate the 15 wins in which Silvio De Souza played during that season, Big 12 Tournament title, NCAA appearance and their Final Four appearance due NCAA violations.

Kansas played in the 2015 World University Games in South Korea as the United States representatives in July 2015. The Jayhawks went undefeated in the World University Games, winning the championship to give the United States its first gold medal in World University Games men's basketball since 2005. In August 2017, Self and the Jayhawks traveled to Italy to play four exhibition matches against local professional Italian teams.

Shortly before the 2019–20 season began the NCAA announced they had major NCAA violations stemming from their involvement in the 2017–18 NCAA Division I men's basketball corruption scandal putting their NCAA record consecutive tournament appearance streak in jeopardy.

The Jayhawks finished the 2019–20 regular season 28–3 and were unanimously ranked number one in the final regular season AP poll. The Jayhawks went undefeated against unranked teams, and their three losses came to ranked teams. The Jayhawks were a favorite to win the NCAA Tournament, but the tournament was cancelled on March 12, 2020, due to the COVID-19 pandemic.

The following season, the Jayhawks struggled early in the conference schedule. After eight games, they had a 4–4 conference record. At one point during conference play, they lost five of seven games which included a 3-game losing streak, a rarity under Self. They would finish the regular season the season winning seven of their last eight games, including a 71–58 defeat of number 2 ranked Baylor, who was undefeated going into the game. Kansas withdrew from the Big 12 tournament after a player tested positive for COVID-19. They qualified for the tournament, extending their NCAA record to 31 consecutive tournaments. They defeated Eastern Washington in the first round. The following round, they were beaten by USC 51–85, their worst NCAA Tournament loss in school history and one of the worst defeats in program history.

On April 2, 2021, Kansas signed Self to a lifetime contract. The contract will automatically add an extra year to every year he coaches until he retires or dies.

The 2021–22 team earned a number 1 seed in the 2022 NCAA tournament. They defeated Providence in the tournament to become the winningest program in the nation. They defeated Villanova in the Final Four. The Jayhawks defeated North Carolina 72–69 in the national championship game to win Self's second championship, and the team's fourth NCAA championship. In the championship game, they completed a 16-point comeback, including being down 40–25 at halftime, the largest in NCAA championship history.

== Conference affiliations ==
Kansas has been affiliated with the following conferences:

Conference	Years	Reason left
Independent	1898–1907	Joined MVIAA
Missouri Valley Intercollegiate Athletic Association*	1907–1928	Conference dissolved
Big Six/Seven/Eight Conference	1929–1995	Conference dissolved
Big 12 Conference	1996–present	N/A

*While there is an active conference with the name Missouri Valley, it is officially and legally a separate entity from the MVIAA.

== Rank in notable areas ==
Category	Rank	Stat
All-time wins	2nd	2,438
All-time win %	2nd	.726
Regular season conference championships	1st	63
Consecutive reg. season conf. championships	T-1st	13
NCAA Tournament titles	7th	4
NCAA title game appearances	5th	10
NCAA Final Four appearances	5th	15
NCAA Elite Eight appearances	3rd	24
NCAA Sweet 16 appearances	4th	31
NCAA Tournament appearances	3rd	50
Consecutive NCAA Tournament appearances	1st	28
NCAA Tournament No. 1 seeds	2nd	16
NCAA Tournament games played	3rd	165
NCAA Tournament wins	4th	116
NCAA Tournament win %	T-6th	.662
Weeks ranked as AP No. 1	5th	65
Weeks ranked as AP No. 2	2nd	102
Weeks ranked in AP Top 5	4th	359
Weeks ranked in AP Top 10	4th	558
Weeks ranked in AP Poll	4th	764
Appearances in Final AP Poll	4th	44
Consecutive weeks ranked in AP Poll	1st	231
Seasons with 35 wins or more	3rd	4
Seasons with 30 wins or more	T–2nd	14
Seasons with 25 wins or more	3rd	34
Seasons with 20 wins or more	5th	49
Seasons with a winning record	1st	99
Seasons with a non-losing record	1st	102
Consecutive seasons with 30 wins	1st	4
Consecutive seasons with 25 wins	1st	13
Consecutive seasons with 20 wins	1st	27
Consensus First Team All-American selections	1st	30
Consensus First Team All-American players	1st	23
Academic All-American selections	2nd	15
Academic All-American players	1st	11

Ranks and records listed in table do not include wins, championships, and appearances vacated by the NCAA in 2023.
Current official NCAA Records and Awards data.

== Notable games ==
- On February 3, 1899, the Jayhawks, coached by James Naismith played their first game in program history. They played the Kansas City YMCA in a game the Jayhawks lost 5–16.
- The first victory in program history came on February 10, 1899. The Jayhawks defeated the Topeka YMCA 31–6.
- On January 25, 1907, the Jayhawks played Kansas State for the first time, beginning the rivalry that would become known as the Sunflower Showdown, a nod to the state flower of Kansas and one of the state's nicknames, the Sunflower State. The Jayhawks won 54–49.
- The Jayhawks bitter rivalry with Missouri began on March 11, 1907, a game the Jayhawks lost 31–34. The rivalry would eventually become known as the Border War.
- On March 22, 1940, the Jayhawks played their first ever NCAA Tournament game. They defeated Rice 50–44 in Municipal Auditorium in Kansas City, Missouri. The Jayhawks would defeat USC the following day to make their first national championship game appearance, but lost to Indiana 42–60.
- On March 26, 1952, the Jayhawks defeated St. John's (NY) 80–63 to win their first NCAA Tournament National Championship Championship in program history.
- On March 1, 1955, Kansas played their first ever game at Allen Fieldhouse. The arena was named after Phog Allen, who was still their coach at the time. They won the game against rival Kansas State, 77–67.
- In the NCAA title game in 1957, Wilt Chamberlain and Kansas were defeated by the North Carolina Tar Heels 54–53 in triple overtime in what many consider to be the greatest NCAA Championship game ever played. Chamberlain was later named the NCAA Final Four Most Outstanding Player, the second to win the award and be a part of the losing team (Kansas's B.H. Born won the award in 1953).
- In the 1966 Midwest Regional Finals, Kansas, the favored team to face Kentucky, played Texas Western. Texas Western got a controversial double overtime victory, 81–80. The would-be winning shot, a 35-footer, at the buzzer was made by All-American Jo Jo White at the end of the first overtime, but White was called for stepping on the sideline. The game was featuredin the 2006 film Glory Road which is based on that season's Texas Western National Championship team.
- On April 4, 1988, in the 50th NCAA Tournament National Championship game, Kansas defeated the heavily favored Oklahoma Sooners 83–79 to win its second NCAA Men's Basketball championship. Led by senior forward and Player of the Year Danny Manning, Kevin Pritchard, Milt Newton, Chris Piper and a roster of players who came to be known as "The Miracles" raced the Sooners to a 50–50 halftime tie that had the referees shaking their heads and smiling as they left the court. Upon their return for the second half, Larry Brown convinced his Jayhawks that now that they proved they could run with the Sooners, they needed to slow the game down and take the Sooners out of their fast break offense. The Sooners built a 5-point second half lead until the Kansas defense finally clamped down. The Jayhawks, led by Manning (31 points, 18 rebounds, 5 steals, 2 blocked shots), caught up with them around the 11 minute mark. The rest of the game was neck and neck, until Manning finally sealed the victory from the free throw line.
- On December 9, 1989, AP #2 Kansas beat Kentucky 150–95 in Allen Fieldhouse. The 150 points scored by the Jayhawks set the school record for most points scored in a game, and the team's 80 first-half points set the record for most points scored in a half.
- On January 27, 2003, Kansas defeated Texas 90–87 at Allen Fieldhouse behind a 24-point, 23-rebound performance by Nick Collison. Upon Collison fouling out of the game, his effort moved longtime ESPN college basketball analyst Dick Vitale to give him a standing ovation, only the second time Vitale had ever done so. (the first being for David Robinson) Both Kansas and Texas would make the Final Four that year.
- On April 7, 2008, in the 2008 National Championship game, the Kansas Jayhawks defeated the Memphis Tigers 75–68 in a come from behind overtime victory to become the 2008 NCAA Division I men's basketball tournament Champions. Mario Chalmers made a three-point shot with 2.1 seconds remaining, bringing the Jayhawks all the way back from a 60–51 deficit with two minutes remaining. The Jayhawks went 4–4 from the field, including 2–2 from 3-point range, and also went 2–2 from the line in the final 2 minutes. The Jayhawks then continued their hot flurry by going 4–6 from the field in OT and 4–4 from the line, outscoring the Tigers 12–5 in overtime to capture their third NCAA title, and fifth overall, including the retroactively awarded Helms Foundation Championships for the 1922 and 1923 seasons. Chalmers finished with 18 points, 3 rebounds, 3 assists, and 4 steals, and was chosen the Most Outstanding Player at the Final Four, the fifth Jayhawk all-time to be selected Final Four MOP.
- On January 15, 2011, Kansas celebrated its 69th consecutive home win (over Nebraska), the longest such Division I record since 1992 and the longest home winning streak in KU's history. (The streak ended on January 22, 2011, with a loss at home to the Texas Longhorns.)
- On February 25, 2012, the Jayhawks played their final conference game against their longtime rival, the Missouri Tigers. The Kansas Jayhawks came back from a 19-point deficit in the second half to take the team to an 87–86 overtime win against the Tigers. The volume level inside the arena was a sustained 120 dB, with a high point of 127 dB when Thomas Robinson blocked Phil Pressey's shot at the end of regulation to preserve the tie.
- On January 4, 2016, the Jayhawks, who were ranked 1st in the AP poll and 2nd in the coaches poll, played Oklahoma, who was ranked 2nd in the AP poll and 1st in the coaches poll. The game was back and forth the last few minutes of regulation. The game eventually went to 3 overtimes, and KU won 109–106. Kansas forward Perry Ellis scored 27 points and got 13 rebounds while Oklahoma guard Buddy Hield scored 46 points. The game was the first time in Big 12 history that a conference game featured the number 1 ranked team and the number 2 ranked team.
- On February 27, 2016, the Jayhawks won their 12th consecutive Big 12 regular season championship with a 67–58 win at home against Texas Tech. Kansas is one regular season conference championship behind UCLA's record of 13 straight.
- On March 25, 2018, the Jayhawks played Duke in the 2018 NCAA tournament in the Elite Eight. The game featured two of the top college basketball programs in the nation with a Hall of Fame coach on both sidelines with Bill Self and Mike Krzyzewski. The game was a back and forth game that had 18 lead changes and 11 ties. Senior guard Sviatoslav Mykhailiuk made a 3 pointer with 25.7 seconds left to tie the game at 72. Duke guard Grayson Allen missed the potential game winning shot as time expired and the game went into overtime. Kansas guard Malik Newman scored all 13 of the Jayhawks points in overtime to help them win 85–81 earning KU their first Final Four trip since 2012. The win was later officially vacated by the NCAA.
- When the Jayhawks defeated North Carolina in the 2022 National Championship game, they completed the largest comeback in National Championship game history. They were down by as much as 16 points in the first half and were down 25–40 at halftime and won 72–69.

== Coaches ==
Despite having a program for over 120 years, the Jayhawks have only had eight head coaches. Four of their coaches have been inducted to the Hall of Fame as a coach. The longest tenured coach was Phog Allen at 39 seasons, while the shortest tenured coach was Larry Brown, who coached for five seasons. Bill Self, the current head coach, is the winningest coach in team history with 591. Allen is the next closest to Self with 590 wins. Ted Owens is the only coach in program history to have been fired. Allen and Harp are the only Jayhawk coaches to have also played at the school. Self had his first coaching job as an assistant under Brown at Kansas.

Of programs who have been around for at least 100 years, Kansas has had the fewest coaches, yet they have been led to the Final Four by more coaches than any other program. Every coach that has coached Kansas since the inception of the NCAA Tournament in 1939 has led the team to a Final Four. Phog Allen, Dick Harp, Ted Owens, Larry Brown, Roy Williams, and Bill Self have all led Kansas to NCAA Final Four appearances. Of those coaches, Allen, Brown, and Self have led the Jayhawks to NCAA Championships (in 1952, 1988, 2008, and 2022 respectively). In addition to an NCAA Tournament National Championship, Allen won two retroactively awarded Helms Athletic Foundation National Championships for the 1922 and 1923 seasons. Allen and Self are the only coaches to win multiple National Championships of any kind, while Self is the only one to win multiple NCAA Tournament National Championships.

While officially only having had eight coaches in program history, the Jayhawks also had three interim coaches who are not considered an official part of the coaching history. In 1919, Karl Schlademan coached, and won, the first game of the season before relinquishing the coaching position to Allen in order to concentrate on his duties as head track coach. In 1947, Howard Engleman coached 14 games (going 8–6) after Allen was ordered to take a rest following the 13th game of the season. Engleman's record is not listed in this table as he was never officially a head coach at the university. Assistant coach Norm Roberts served as acting head coach for the beginning of the 2022–23 season while Bill Self served a four-game suspension for alleged recruiting violations. He served as the acting head coach again for Kansas in the Big 12 and NCAA Tournaments while Bill Self was away from the team following a heart procedure. Each of these coaches have every one of their wins counted in their career records in the NCAA record books. The only exception is Roberts, who only has four wins early in the season counted, instead the four wins and two losses in the postseason; those four wins and two losses are counted in Self's career coaching record.

Years	Duration of head coaching career at Kansas
Record	Number of career games won-lost at Kansas
Percent	Percentage of games won at Kansas
	Inducted to the Naismith Memorial Basketball Hall of Fame as a coach

Number	Years	Coach	Record	Percent	Reason left	Notes
1	1898–1907	James Naismith†	55–60	.478	Retired	• Inventor of the game of basketball • Only coach in Kansas basketball history with a losing record
2	1907–1909, 1919–1956	Phog Allen	590–219	.729	Retired*	• Known as the "father of basketball coaching" for his innovations of the modern game and for the legendary coaches who played under him • Created the NABC (National Association of Basketball Coaches) • Successfully lobbied to make the game of basketball an Olympic sport • Helped to create the modern NCAA tournament, which began in 1939 • 1 NCAA Championship, 2 Helms Championships • 3 National Championship game appearances • 3 Final Fours • 24 conference regular season Championships
3	1909–1919	W. O. Hamilton	125–59	.679	Resigned	• 5 conference regular season championships
–	1919	Karl Schlademan	1–0	1.000	Interim	Coached a single game before resigning and allowing Phog Allen to take over
–	1946–1947	Howard Engleman	8–6	.571	Interim	Coached 14 games while Phog Allen was on a medical leave
4	1956–1964	Dick Harp	121–82	.596	Resigned	• 1 National Championship game appearance • 1 Final Four • 2 conference regular season championships
5	1964–1983	Ted Owens	348–182	.657	Fired	• 2 Final Fours • 6 conference regular season championships • 1 conference tournament championship • 1978 Basketball Weekly Coach of the Year
6	1983–1988	Larry Brown	135–44	.754	Accepted position with the San Antonio Spurs	• 1 NCAA Championship • 2 Final Fours • 1 conference regular season championship • 2 conference tournament championships • 1988 Naismith College Coach of the Year
7	1988–2003	Roy Williams	418–101	.805	Accepted position at North Carolina	• 2 National Championship game appearances • 4 Final Fours • 9 conference regular season championships • 4 conference tournament championships • 1990 Henry Iba Award Coach of the Year • 1992 AP Coach of the Year • 1997 Naismith College Coach of the Year
8	2003–present	Bill Self	565–132‡	.806‡	Still active	• 2 NCAA Championships • 3 National Championship game appearances • 3 Final Fours‡ • 14 consecutive conference regular season championships • 16 conference regular season championships‡ • 8 conference tournament championships‡ • 2009 Henry Iba Award Coach of the Year, AP Coach of the Year, CBS/Chevrolet Coach of the Year, Sporting News Coach of the Year • 2012 Naismith College Coach of the Year, Sporting News Coach of the Year, Adolph Rupp Cup • 2006, 2009, 2011, 2012, 2017, 2018 Big 12 Conference Men's Basketball Coach of the Year • 2016 AP Coach of the Year
–	2022–2023	Norm Roberts	4–0	1.000	Acting	Coached first four games of 2022–2023 season while Bill Self served a suspension for recruiting violations. Also coached Kansas in the Big 12 Tournament and NCAA Tournament following a heart procedure on Self; however, Self received credit for those six games in the NCAA record books.
Total		thru 2022–23	2,370–885	.727	N/A	

*Allen was forced to retire prior to the 1956–57 season due to a University of Kansas policy that required university employees to retire at the age of 70; he turned 70 in November of 1955.
†Naismith is inducted in the Hall of Fame as the inventor of the game, not as a coach.
‡Does not include 15 wins, 1 regular season Conference Championship, 1 Conference Tournament Championship, and 1 Final Four appearance vacated by the NCAA.

Updated March 20, 2023

== Facilities ==
Since first fielding a program, the Jayhawks have had three official home arenas. Kansas also occasionally will play regular season games at the T-Mobile Center in Kansas City.

=== Early venues (1898–1907) ===
Before 1907 the Jayhawks played in various venues, ranging from the basement of the original Snow Hall (even though the ceiling was only 14 feet high) to the skating rink at the local YMCA. Although a current campus building bears the same name, the original Snow Hall was demolished in 1934.

=== Robinson Gymnasium (1907–1927) ===
Robinson Gym was the first athletic building on the KU campus and featured a 2,500-seat auditorium used for basketball purposes. The building was demolished in 1967.

=== Hoch Auditorium (1927–1955) ===
Hoch Auditorium was a 3,500 seat multi-purpose arena in Lawrence, Kansas. It opened in 1927. It was home to the University of Kansas Jayhawks basketball teams until Allen Fieldhouse opened in 1955.

Hoch's nicknames during the basketball years included "Horrible Hoch" and "The House of Horrors." These nicknames were in reference to the difficulty opposing teams had in dealing with the tight area surrounding the court and the curved walls and decorative lattice work directly behind the backboards. The curvature of the walls made the backboards appear to be moving, causing opponents to miss free throws.

On June 15, 1991, Hoch Auditorium was struck by lightning. The auditorium and stage area were completely destroyed. Only the limestone facade and lobby area were spared. When reconstruction of the building was complete, the rear half of the building was named Budig Hall, for then KU Chancellor Gene Budig. The name on the facade was altered to reflect the presence of three large auditorium-style lecture halls within the building: Hoch Auditoria.

Former KU basketball facilities

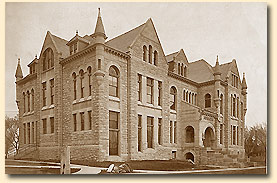
Snow Hall

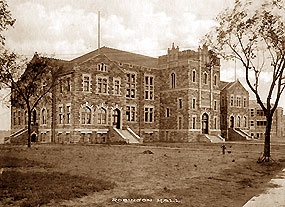
Robinson Gymnasium

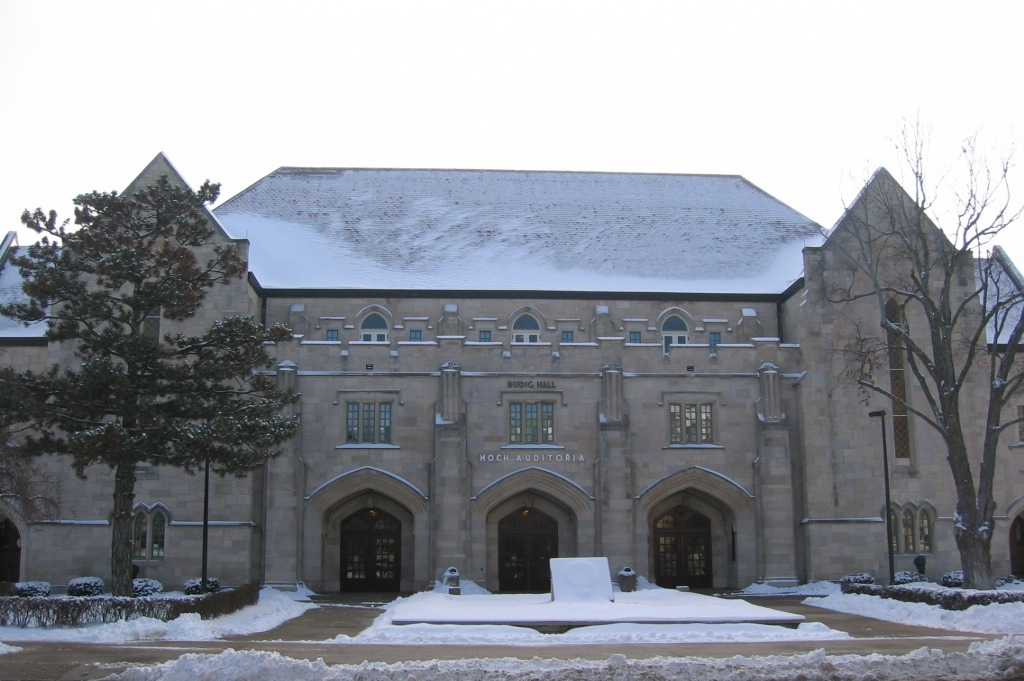
The remaining facade of what was Hoch Auditorium

=== Allen Fieldhouse (1955–present) ===
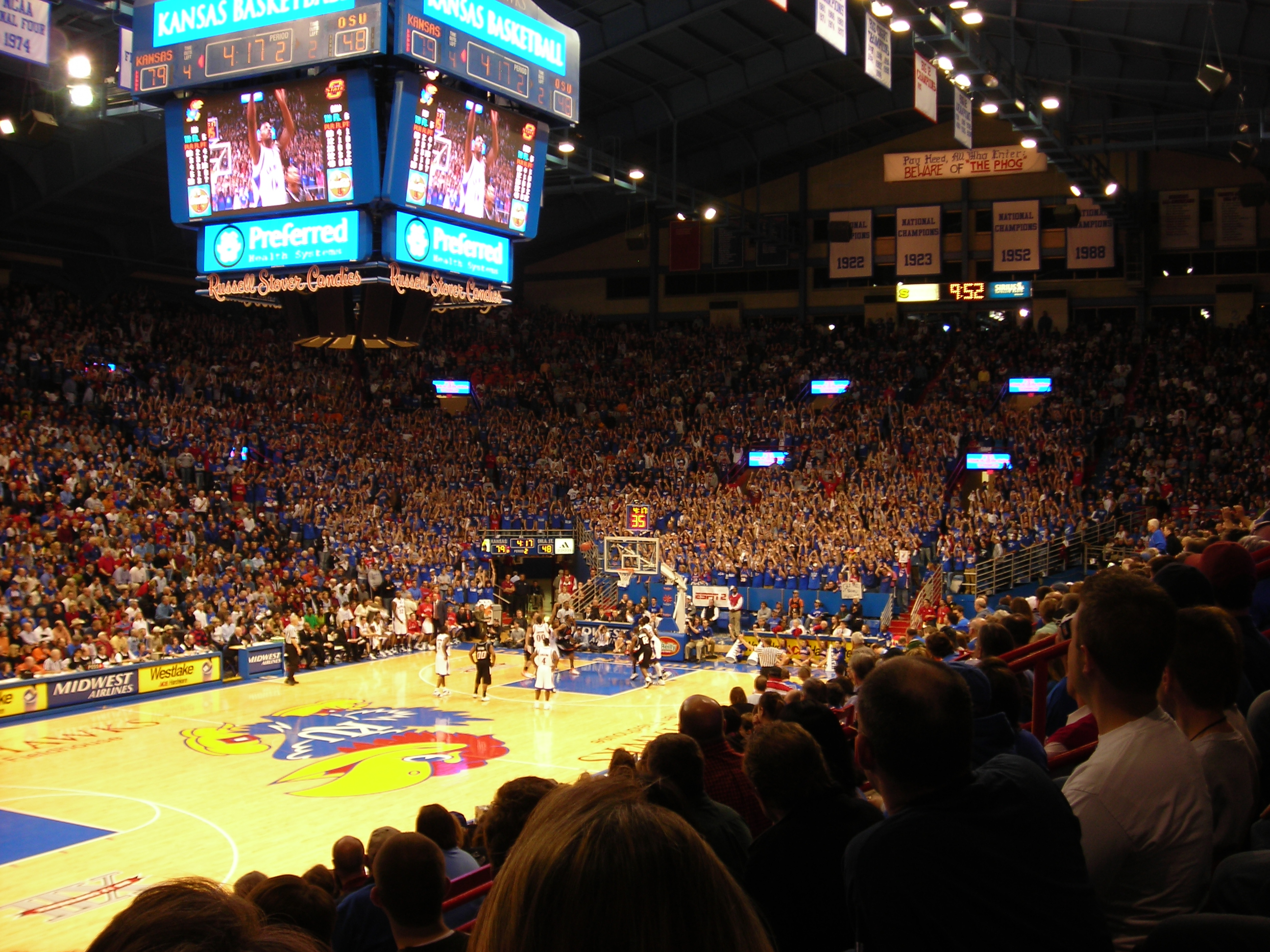
The 2006–07 men's basketball team plays against OSU at Allen Fieldhouse.

Allen Fieldhouse was dedicated on March 1, 1955, when the Jayhawks defeated in-state rival, Kansas State 77–67.

Since February 20, 1994, the Jayhawks have lost only 14 regular season games in Allen Fieldhouse, a 263–14 record (.951). Since February 3, 2007, the Jayhawks have gone 227–9 (.962) at Allen Fieldhouse, as of April 17, 2021, one of the best home records in all of basketball.

Allen Fieldhouse is also notorious for its noise level. On November 4, 2010, ESPN the Magazine named Allen Fieldhouse the loudest college basketball arena in the country, as it reached sustained decibel levels over 120. On February 13, 2017, in a game against Big 12 opponent West Virginia, fans at Allen Fieldhouse broke the Guinness World Record for loudest crowd roar at an indoor sporting event, with a roar of 130.4 decibels, set by Kentucky on January 28 against Kansas.

In the DeBruce Center at the northeast corner of the building is the original document of the Dr. Naismith's original 13 rules of basketball, purchased at auction by the Booth family for $4.3 million on December 10, 2010.

Kansas won 69 consecutive games at the Fieldhouse between February 3, 2007, and January 17, 2011, until Texas ended the longest streak in NCAA Division I since 1992 with a 74–63 win against Kansas on January 22, 2011. This streak broke Kansas's previous school record of 62, which lasted from February 26, 1994, through December 18, 1998 (during which time the Jayhawks, along with the remaining members of the Big Eight Conference merged with the remaining members of the Southwest Conference to become charter members of the Big 12 Conference). The Jayhawks also completed a 55-game streak between February 22, 1984, through January 30, 1988, which is a Big 8 record.

== Home game traditions ==
Before the start of every Jayhawks home game, after the singing of "The Star-Spangled Banner", it is a tradition to sing the alma mater, "Crimson and the Blue". While singing the alma mater, it is tradition for the students in attendance to put an arm over the shoulders of their neighbors and slowly sway side to side, lifting their arms over their heads as the last line of the song is sung. The song is concluded by the Rock Chalk Chant.

Post-game, the band will play a rendition of the Kansas state song "Home on the Range", which the crowd will stand up for similar to the national anthem.

After singing "The Star-Spangled Banner", while the opposing team is being introduced, members of the student section take out a copy of the student-run newspaper, The University Daily Kansan, and wave the paper in front of their faces, pretending to be reading it in an effort to show lack of interest in the opposing team. After the opponents are introduced, a short video is shown, detailing the history and the accomplishments of Kansas basketball. As the Jayhawks are introduced, the students rip up their newspapers and throw the confetti pieces of paper in the air as celebration. Whatever confetti remains is typically thrown in the air after the first basket made by the Jayhawks.

If an opposing player fouls out of the game, the fans will "wave the wheat", waving their arms back and forth, as a sarcastic good-bye to the disqualified player, to the tune of "You Didn't Have Your Wheaties", from a series of 1970s television commercials promoting Wheaties breakfast cereal. The same waving motion to the tune of "A Hot Time in the Old Town" follows a Jayhawk victory.

If the Jayhawks are leading comfortably near the end of the game, the crowd begins a slow version of the Rock Chalk Chant, which has become the signature tradition of Allen Fieldhouse. The chant can also occasionally be heard at neutral sites, such as arenas for the NCAA tournament and the nearby T-Mobile Center on the Missouri side of Kansas City which during the regular season serves as an alternate home arena.

Fans and students will also line up early for Late Night In The Phog, which is the first practice of the season. The practice is viewable to the public and includes skits with past players as the hosts.

== Rivalries ==
=== Kansas State ===
The Jayhawks longest played rivalry is with cross-state rival Kansas State. The Jayhawks lead the series 203–94. The Jayhawks have dominated the series since 1984 holding a record of 86–12 in that time frame. K-State has not led the all-time series since 1922. The schools have met annually since 1912 and first played in 1907. Kansas leads in Lawrence 93–35, in Manhattan 81–48, and on neutral courts 29–11. The Largest K-State victory was by 27 points, 96–69, on January 20, 1979. The largest Kansas win was 45 points, 90–45, on March 10, 1955. K-State longest win streak was five games, which they achieved twice, from 1972 to 1974 and 1982–83. The longest winning streak from Kansas was 31 games from 1994 to 2005.

=== Missouri ===
The Jayhawks main rival has been Missouri for many years. The two teams first played in 1907. The two teams played every year until Missouri left the Big 12 for the SEC. The schools renewed the rivalry beginning in the 2021–22 season. The Jayhawks won the first game in the renewal of the rivalry 102–65. KU leads the all-time series 174–94. The Jayhawks largest victory was 47 points, 96–49, on December 28, 1977. Missouri's largest victory was 30 points, 99–69, on January 17, 1976. The Jayhawks longest winning streak was 14 games from 1910 to 1913. Missouri's longest winning streak was 9 from 1920 to 1922.

=== Wichita State ===
While not officially a rivalry, the Jayhawks have played cross-state opponent Wichita State 16 times. The teams most recently met in the 2023–24 season with KU winning 86–67. Kansas leads the all-time series 13–3. The Jayhawks' largest victory was a 49-point win in 1993. The Shockers' largest victory was a 14-point win in the second round of the 2015 NCAA Tournament. Wichita State has never won consecutive games against Kansas. The Jayhawks won five times in a row from 1989 to 1993. Wichita State won both games between the schools in the NCAA Tournament.

== Post-season results ==
=== Regular season conference championships ===
The Jayhawks have won 62 conference championships since their inception, including an NCAA record 13 consecutive from 2005 through 2017. The Jayhawks have belonged to the Big 12 Conference since it formed before the 1996–97 season. Before that, the Jayhawks have belonged to the Missouri Valley Intercollegiate Athletic Association from the 1907–08 to 1927–28 seasons, the Big Six Conference from 1928–29 to 1946–47, the Big Seven Conference from 1947–48 to 1957–58, the Big Eight Conference from 1958 to 1959 up until the end of the 1995–96 season. The Big Six and Big Seven conferences were actually the more often used names of the Missouri Valley Intercollegiate Athletic Association, which existed under that official name until 1964, when it was changed to the Big Eight.

Missouri Valley Intercollegiate Athletic Association (13)

- 1908, 1909, 1910, 1911, 1912, 1914, 1915, 1922, 1923, 1924, 1925, 1926, 1927

Big 6/7/8 Conference (30)

- 1931, 1932, 1933, 1934, 1936, 1937, 1938, 1940, 1941, 1942, 1943, 1946, 1950, 1952, 1953, 1954, 1957, 1960, 1966, 1967, 1971, 1974, 1975, 1978, 1986, 1991, 1992, 1993, 1995, 1996

Big 12 Conference (20)

- 1997, 1998, 2002, 2003, 2005, 2006, 2007, 2008, 2009, 2010, 2011, 2012, 2013, 2014, 2015, 2016, 2017, 2020, 2022, 2023

*Vacated by the NCAA and not included in the count.

=== Conference tournament championships ===
The Big Eight Conference did not regularly have a post-season tournament until after the 1977 season. Prior to that teams usually played in the Big Eight (before that, Big Seven) Holiday Tournament in December. The Holiday Tournament ended after the 1979 season.

Big Seven/Big Eight Holiday Tournament (13)

- 1951, 1953, 1956, 1957, 1962, 1964, 1965, 1966, 1968, 1970, 1974, 1977, 1978

Big Eight Conference (4)

- 1981, 1984, 1986, 1992

Big 12 Conference (11)

- 1997, 1998, 1999, 2006, 2007, 2008, 2010, 2011, 2013, 2016, 2018*, 2022

*Vacated by the NCAA and not included in the count.

=== NCAA Tournament seeding history ===
The NCAA started seeding teams with the 1978 tournament, with the seeding format used today beginning in 1979. The Jayhawks were seeded for the first time in their 1981 tournament appearance. There was no tournament in 2020 due to the COVID-19 pandemic.

Years →	'81	'84	'85	'86	'87	'88	'90	'91	'92	'93	'94	'95	'96	'97	'98	'99	'00	'01	'02	'03
Seeds→	7	5	3	1	5	6	2	3	1	2	4	1	2	1*	1	6	8	4	1	2

Years →	'04	'05	'06	'07	'08	'09	'10	'11	'12	'13	'14	'15	'16	'17	'18†	'19	'21	'22	'23	'24	'25
Seeds→	4	3	4	1	1	3	1*	1	2	1	2	2	1*	1	1	4	3	1	1	4	7

* Indicates overall number one seed.

#

Indicates NCAA championship.

†Vacated by the NCAA

=== Final Four history ===
- 1940-Runner-up
- 1952-Champion
- 1953-Runner-up
- 1957-Runner-up
- 1971-Semifinalist
- 1974-Semifinalist
- 1986-Semifinalist
- 1988-Champion
- 1991-Runner-up
- 1993-Semifinalist
- 2002-Semifinalist
- 2003-Runner-up
- 2008-Champion
- 2012-Runner-up
- 2018-Semifinalist*
- 2022-Champion

*Vacated by the NCAA.

=== Men's NCAA Tournament Most Outstanding Player ===
- 1952 – Clyde Lovellette
- 1953 – B. H. Born*
- 1957 – Wilt Chamberlain*
- 1988 – Danny Manning
- 2008 – Mario Chalmers
- 2022 – Ochai Agbaji

*Did not play on a championship team

=== National championships ===
The Jayhawks have been awarded a combined six championships: two Helms Championships and four NCAA Tournament National Championships. The Helms titles were awarded retroactively by the Helms Athletic Foundation in 1943. Some schools do not claim Helms championships; Kansas, however, does claim them, and has a banner hanging for both in Allen Fieldhouse, along with their NCAA Tournament championships.

==== Helms Athletic Foundation Championships ====
- 1921-22

Head coach: Phog Allen
Record: 16-2

- 1922-23

Head coach: Phog Allen
Record: 17-1

==== NCAA Tournament National Championships ====
===== 1952 =====
The Jayhawks 1951–52 team won the school's first NCAA Tournament Championship. They were coached by Phog Allen and finished the season with a 28–3 record.

1952 NCAA Tournament results
Round	Opponent	Score
First round	TCU	68–64
Second round	Saint Louis	74–55
Final Four	Santa Clara	74–55
Championship	St. John's	80–63

===== 1988 =====
The 1987–88 team won the Jayhawks' second NCAA Tournament championship. They were coached by Larry Brown. They finished the season 27–11, which is the lowest winning percentage (.710) and most losses of any team to win the national championship. This remains the only championship team of the Jayhawks that did not win the regular season conference championship or the conference tournament championship.

1988 NCAA Tournament results
Round	Opponent	Score
First round	No. 11 Xavier	85–72
Second round	No. 14 Murray State	61–58
Sweet Sixteen	No. 7 Vanderbilt	77–64
Elite Eight	No. 4 Kansas State	71–58
Final Four	No. 2 Duke	66–59
Championship	No. 1 Oklahoma	83–79

===== 2008 =====
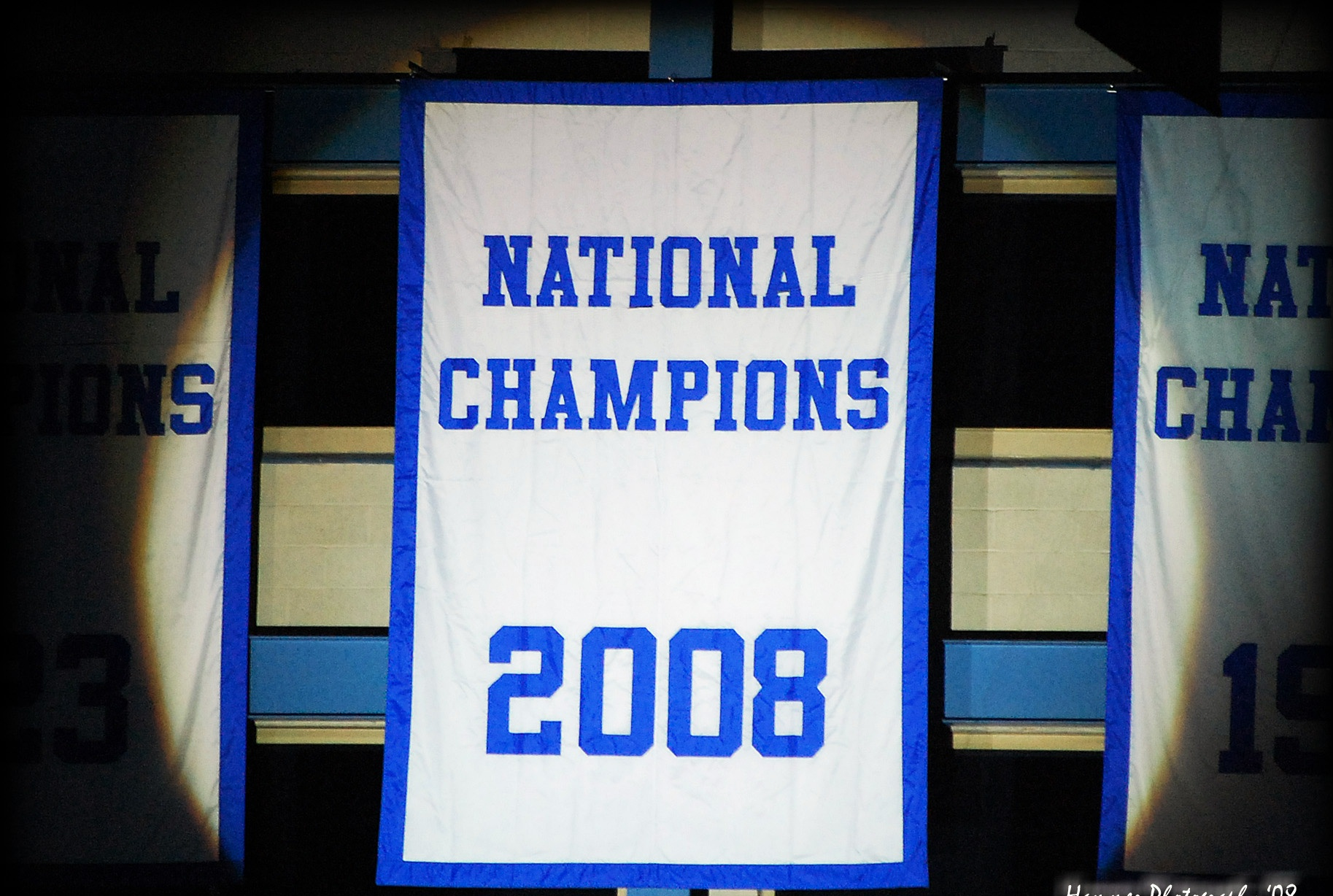
The banner in Allen Fieldhouse for the 2008 National Championship

The 2007–08 team won the Jayhawks' third NCAA Tournament Championship. They were coached by Bill Self and finished the season with a 37–3 record, which is a school record for wins in a season.

2008 NCAA Tournament results
Round	Opponent	Score
First round	No. 16 Portland State	85–61
Second round	No. 8 UNLV	75–56
Sweet Sixteen	No. 12 Villanova	72–57
Elite Eight	No. 10 Davidson	59–57
Final Four	No. 1 North Carolina	84–66
Championship	No. 1 Memphis	75–68^{OT}

===== 2022 =====
The 2021–22 team won the Jayhawks' fourth NCAA Tournament Championship, their most recent championship. They were coached by Bill Self and finished the season with a 34–6 record. The Jayhawks' tournament run in 2022 is the only one since teams began being seeded in which they did not play a single number 1 seed in the Final Four and National Championship game.

2022 NCAA Tournament Rrsults
Round	Opponent	Score
First round	No. 16 Texas Southern	83–56
Second round	No. 9 Creighton	79–72
Sweet Sixteen	No. 4 Providence	66–61
Elite Eight	No. 10 Miami (FL)	76–50
Final Four	No. 2 Villanova	81–65
Championship	No. 8 North Carolina	72–69

=== Complete NCAA tournament results ===
The Jayhawks have appeared in the NCAA tournament 52 times. Their combined record is 118–52. Their largest victory in a tournament game was a 58-point (110–52) victory over Prairie View A&M in 1998, which is also the Jayhawks tournament record for most points scored in a tournament game. Their largest defeat in a tournament game was a 34-point defeat (51–85) against USC in 2021, which was also their lowest point total in the NCAA tournament total since the introduction of the shot clock in the 1985–86 season. They have been eliminated in the first round only seven times since the beginning of the tournament, only three of those times have been since the tournament expanded to 64 teams. The Jayhawks have played in 11 overtime games in the NCAA Tournament and have a 6–5 record.

Two of their overtime games went into multiple overtimes, both of which have been depicted in film. Their three overtime game against North Carolina in the 1957 National Championship game was depicted in the film Jayhawkers and their double overtime loss to Texas Western in the 1966 Elite Eight, which was featured in the 2006 film Glory Road.

Only four times in program history has Kansas failed to win a single game in the tournament and only twice since the tournament expanded to 64 teams in 1985.

Like most schools, Kansas rarely plays conference opponents in the tournament. The 1988 tournament was the only time they've ever played conference opponents. In that tournament they defeated rival Kansas State in the Elite 8 and Oklahoma in the national championship game.

Appearances are grouped by the number of teams in the bracket. Round names are based on what the names were at the time of the tournament, not the present names. The term "Elite eight" began in 1956, "Final four" began in 1975, and "Sweet Sixteen" began in 1988.

Eight team tournament

Year	Round	Opponent	Result
1940	First round Semifinals; National Championship	Rice; USC; Indiana	W 50–44; W 43–42; L 42–60
1942	First round Regional 3rd Place Game	Colorado; Rice	L 44–46; W 55–53

Sixteen to Thirty-two team tournament

Year	Round	Opponent	Result
1952	First round Quarterfinals; Semifinals; National Championship	TCU; Saint Louis; Santa Clara; St. John's	W 68–64; W 74–55; W 74–55; W 80–63
1953	First round Quarterfinals; Semifinals; National Championship	Oklahoma City; Oklahoma A&M; Washington; Indiana	W 73–65; W 61–55; W 79–53; L 68–69
1957	First round Elite eight Semifinals; National Championship	SMU; Oklahoma City; San Francisco; North Carolina	W 73–65^{OT} W 81–61; W 80–56; L 53–54^{3OT}
1960	First round Elite eight	Texas; Cincinnati	W 90–81; L 71–82
1966	First round Elite eight	SMU; Texas Western	W 76–70; L 80–81^{2OT}
1967	First round Regional 3rd Place	Houston; Louisville	L 53–66; W 70–68
1971	First round Elite eight Semifinals; National 3rd Place Game	Houston; Drake; UCLA; Western Kentucky	W 78–77; W 73–71; L 60–68; L 75–77
1974	First round Elite eight Semifinals; National 3rd Place Game	Creighton; Oral Roberts; Marquette; UCLA	W 55–54; W 93–90^{OT} L 51–64; L 61–78
1975	First round	Notre Dame	L 71–77
1978	First round	UCLA	L 76–83

Forty to fifty-three teams

Year	Seed	Round	Opponent	Result
1981	No. 7	First round Second round Regional semifinal	No. 10 Ole Miss; No. 2 Arizona State; No. 6 Wichita State	W 69–66; W 88–71; L 65–66
1984	No. 5	First round Second round	No. 12 Alcorn State; No. 4 Wake Forest	W 57–56; L 59–69

Sixty-four teams

Year	Seed	Round	Opponent	Result
1985	No. 3	First round Second round	No. 14 Ohio; No. 11 Auburn	W 49–38; L 64–66
1986	No. 1	First round Second round Regional semifinal Elite Eight; Final Four	No. 16 North Carolina A&T; No. 9 Temple; No. 5 Michigan State; No. 6 NC State; No. 1 Duke	W 71–46; W 65–43; W 96–86^{OT} W 75–67; L 67–71
1987	No. 5	First round Second round Regional semifinal	No. 12 Houston; No. 13 SW Missouri State; No. 1 Georgetown	W 66–55; W 67–63; L 57–70
1988	No. 6	First round Second round Sweet Sixteen; Elite Eight; Final Four; National Championship	No. 11 Xavier; No. 14 Murray State; No. 7 Vanderbilt; No. 4 Kansas State; No. 2 Duke; No. 1 Oklahoma	W 85–72; W 61–58; W 77–64; W 71–58; W 66–59; W 83–79
1990	No. 2	First round Second round	No. 15 Robert Morris; No. 7 UCLA	W 79–71; L 70–71
1991	No. 3	First round Second round Sweet Sixteen; Elite Eight; Final Four; National Championship	No. 14 New Orleans; No. 6 Pittsburgh; No. 2 Indiana; No. 1 Arkansas; No. 1 North Carolina; No. 2 Duke	W 55–49; W 77–66; W 83–65; W 93–81; W 79–73; L 65–72
1992	No. 1	First round Second round	No. 16 Howard; No. 9 UTEP	W 100–67; L 60–66
1993	No. 2	First round Second round Sweet Sixteen; Elite Eight; Final Four	No. 15 Ball State; No. 7 BYU; No. 6 California; No. 1 Indiana; No. 1 North Carolina	W 94–72; W 90–76; W 93–76; W 83–77; L 68–78
1994	No. 4	First round Second round Sweet Sixteen	No. 13 UT Chattanooga; No. 5 Wake Forest; No. 1 Purdue	W 102–73; W 69–58; L 78–83
1995	No. 1	First round Second round Sweet Sixteen	No. 16 Colgate; No. 8 Western Kentucky; No. 4 Virginia	W 82–68; W 75–70; L 58–67
1996	No. 2	First round Second round Sweet Sixteen; Elite Eight	No. 15 South Carolina State; No. 10 Santa Clara; No. 3 Arizona; No. 4 Syracuse	W 92–54; W 76–51; W 83–80; L 57–60
1997	No. 1	First round Second round Sweet Sixteen	No. 16 Jackson State; No. 8 Purdue; No. 4 Arizona	W 78–64; W 75–61; L 82–85
1998	No. 1	First round Second round	No. 16 Prairie View A&M; No. 8 Rhode Island	W 110–52; L 75–80

Sixty-five teams

Year	Seed	Round	Opponent	Result
1999	No. 6	First round Second round	No. 11 Evansville; No. 3 Kentucky	W 95–74; L 88–92^{OT}
2000	No. 8	First round Second round	No. 9 DePaul; No. 1 Duke	W 81–77^{OT} L 64–69
2001	No. 4	First round Second round Sweet Sixteen	No. 13 Cal State Northridge; No. 5 Syracuse; No. 1 Illinois	W 99–75; W 87–58; L 64–80
2002	No. 1	First round Second round Sweet Sixteen; Elite Eight; Final Four	No. 16 Holy Cross; No. 8 Stanford; No. 4 Illinois; No. 2 Oregon; No. 1 Maryland	W 70–59; W 86–63; W 73–69; W 104–86; L 88–97
2003	No. 2	First round Second round Sweet Sixteen; Elite Eight; Final Four; National Championship	No. 15 Utah State; No. 10 Arizona State; No. 3 Duke; No. 1 Arizona; No. 3 Marquette; No. 3 Syracuse	W 64–61; W 108–76; W 69–65; W 78–75; W 94–61; L 78–81
2004	No. 4	First round Second round Sweet Sixteen; Elite Eight	No. 13 UIC; No. 12 Pacific; No. 9 UAB; No. 3 Georgia Tech	W 78–44; W 78–63; W 100–74; L 71–79^{OT}
2005	No. 3	First round	No. 14 Bucknell	L 63–64
2006	No. 4	First round	No. 13 Bradley	L 73–77
2007	No. 1	First round Second round Sweet Sixteen; Elite Eight	No. 16 Niagara; No. 8 Kentucky; No. 4 Southern Illinois; No. 2 UCLA	W 107–67; W 88–76; W 61–58; L 55–68
2008	No. 1	First round Second round Sweet Sixteen; Elite Eight; Final Four; National Championship	No. 16 Portland State; No. 8 UNLV; No. 12 Villanova; No. 10 Davidson; No. 1 North Carolina; No. 1 Memphis	W 85–61; W 75–56; W 72–57; W 59–57; W 84–66; W 75–68^{OT}
2009	No. 3	First round Second round Sweet Sixteen	No. 14 North Dakota State; No. 11 Dayton; No. 2 Michigan State	W 84–74; W 60–43; L 62–67
2010	No. 1	First round Second round	No. 16 Lehigh; No. 9 Northern Iowa	W 90–74; L 67–69

First four era

Year	Seed	Round	Opponent	Result
2011*	No. 1	Second round Third round Sweet Sixteen; Elite Eight	No. 16 Boston University; No. 9 Illinois; No. 12 Richmond; No. 11 VCU	W 72–53; W 73–59; W 77–57; L 61–71
2012*	No. 2	Second round Third round Sweet Sixteen; Elite Eight; Final Four; National Championship	No. 15 Detroit; No. 10 Purdue; No. 11 NC State; No. 1 North Carolina; No. 2 Ohio State; No. 1 Kentucky	W 65–50; W 63–60; W 60–57; W 80–67; W 64–62; L 59–67
2013*	No. 1	Second round Third round Sweet Sixteen	No. 16 Western Kentucky; No. 8 North Carolina; No. 4 Michigan	W 64–57; W 70–58; L 85–87^{OT}
2014*	No. 2	Second round Third round	No. 15 Eastern Kentucky; No. 10 Stanford	W 80–69; L 57–60
2015*	No. 2	Second round Third round	No. 15 New Mexico State; No. 7 Wichita State	W 75–56; L 65–78
2016	No. 1	First round Second round Sweet Sixteen; Elite Eight	No. 16 Austin Peay; No. 9 Connecticut; No. 5 Maryland; No. 2 Villanova	W 105–79; W 73–61; W 79–63; L 59–64
2017	No. 1	First round Second round Sweet Sixteen; Elite Eight	No. 16 UC Davis; No. 9 Michigan State; No. 4 Purdue; No. 3 Oregon	W 100–62; W 90–70; W 98–66; L 60–74
2018†	No. 1	First round Second round Sweet Sixteen; Elite Eight; Final Four	No. 16 Penn; No. 8 Seton Hall; No. 5 Clemson; No. 2 Duke; No. 1 Villanova	W 76–60; W 83–79; W 80–76; W 85–81 ^{OT} L 79–95
2019	No. 4	First round Second round	No. 13 Northeastern; No. 5 Auburn	W 87–53; L 75–89
2020	No tournament due to COVID-19 pandemic			
2021	No. 3	First round Second round	No. 14 Eastern Washington; No. 6 USC	W 93–84; L 51–85
2022	No. 1	First round Second round Sweet Sixteen; Elite Eight; Final Four; National Championship	No. 16 Texas Southern; No. 9 Creighton; No. 4 Providence; No. 10 Miami (FL); No. 2 Villanova; No. 8 North Carolina	W 83–56; W 79–72; W 66–61; W 76–50; W 81–65; W 72–69
2023	No. 1	First round Second round	No. 16 Howard; No. 8 Arkansas	W 96–68; L 71–72
2024	No. 4	First round Second round	No. 13 Samford; No. 5 Gonzaga	W 93–89; L 68–89
2025	No. 7	First round	No. 10 Arkansas	L 72–79
2026	No. 4	First round Second round	No. 13 California Baptist; No. 5 St. John's	W 68–60; L 65–67

*Following the introduction of the First Four round in 2011, the Round of 64 and Round of 32 were referred to as the second round and third round, respectively, from 2011 to 2015. Since 2016, Round 64 and Round of 32 are called the first and second rounds.
†NCAA vacated all NCAA Tournament wins from the 2018 tournament, which included their Final Four appearance.

Record by round

Round	Record
First Four	N/A*
Round of 64	36–3‡
Round of 32	23–15‡
Sweet 16	25–7‡
Elite 8	16–9‡
Final Four	10–6
Regional; 3rd place game†	2–0
3rd place game†	0–2
National Championship	4–6

*Since its inception in 2011, Kansas has not participated in the First Four.
†Round no longer played
‡Round does not include a win vacated by the NCAA in 2023.

=== NIT results ===
The Jayhawks have appeared in the National Invitation Tournament (NIT) two times. Their combined record is 3–2.

Year	Round	Opponent	Result
1968	First round Quarterfinals; Semifinals; Final	Temple; Villanova; Saint Peter's; Dayton	W 82–76; W 55–49; W 58–46; L 48–61
1969	First round	Boston College	L 62–78

== Jayhawks of note ==
=== All-time leaders ===
No players appear in all three lists. Five players make two appearances. Due to being the two most recent coaches, Bill Self and Roy Williams have coached the most players on the list. However, three players from the 50s make appearances, including Wilt Chamberlain, despite only playing 48 games for the Jayhawks.

Scoring

Rank	Player	Points	Per game	Years
1	Danny Manning	2,951	20.1	1985–88
2	Nick Collison	2,097	14.8	2000–03
3	Raef LaFrentz	2,066	15.8	1995–98
4	Clyde Lovellette	1,979	24.7	1950–52
5	Sherron Collins	1,888	13.2	2007–10
6	Frank Mason III	1,885	13.0	2014–17
7	Darnell Valentine	1,821	15.4	1978–81
8	Keith Langford	1,812	13.3	2002–05
9	Perry Ellis	1,798	12.5	2012–16
10	Paul Pierce	1,768	16.4	1996–98

Rebounds

Rank	Player	Rebounds	Per game	Years
1	Danny Manning	1,187	8.1	1985–88
2	Raef LaFrentz	1,186	9.1	1995–98
3	Nick Collison	1,143	8.0	2000–03
4	Bill Bridges	1,081	13.9	1959–61
5	Eric Chenowith	933	6.7	1998–2001
6	Drew Gooden	905	9.2	2000–02
7	Wayne Simien	884	8.3	2002–05
8	Wilt Chamberlain	877	18.3	1957–58
9	Cole Aldrich	860	7.7	2008–10
10	Scot Pollard	850	6.6	1994–97

Assists

Rank	Player	Assists	Per game	Years
1	Aaron Miles	954	6.9	2002–05
2	Dajuan Harris Jr.	865	6.1	2020–2025
3	Jacque Vaughn	804	6.4	1994–97
4	Cedric Hunter	684	5.8	1984–87
5	Kirk Hinrich	668	4.7	2000–03
6	Devonte' Graham	632	4.5	2015–18
7	Darnell Valentine	609	5.2	1978–81
8	Frank Mason III	576	4.0	2014–17
9	Tyshawn Taylor	575	3.9	2009–12
10	Adonis Jordan	568	4.1	1990–93

=== All-Americans ===
==== Consensus first team ====
Kansas leads all NCAA teams with 32 consensus First Team All-American selections. 25 different players have received the honor.

- 1909– Tommy Johnson, forward
- 1915– Ralph Sproull, forward
- 1919– Dutch Lonborg, guard
- 1922– Paul Endacott, guard
- 1923– Paul Endacott, guard
- 1923– Charlie T. Black, guard
- 1924– Charlie T. Black, guard
- 1924– Tusten Ackerman, center
- 1925– Tusten Ackerman, center
- 1926– Gale Gordon, guard
- 1926– Al Peterson, center
- 1938– Fred Pralle, guard
- 1941– Howard Engleman, forward
- 1943– Charles B. Black, forward
- 1951– Clyde Lovellette, center
- 1952– Clyde Lovellette, center
- 1957– Wilt Chamberlain, center
- 1958– Wilt Chamberlain, center
- 1987– Danny Manning, forward
- 1988– Danny Manning, forward‡
- 1997– Raef LaFrentz, forward
- 1998– Raef LaFrentz, forward‡
- 1998– Paul Pierce, forward
- 2002– Drew Gooden, forward
- 2003– Nick Collison, forward‡
- 2005– Wayne Simien, forward
- 2010– Sherron Collins, guard
- 2012– Thomas Robinson, forward
- 2017– Frank Mason III, guard
- 2018– Devonte' Graham, guard
- 2022– Ochai Agbaji, guard
- 2023– Jalen Wilson, guard

‡ indicates player has made at least 2000 points and 1000 rebounds in his college career.

==== Other first team selections ====
- 1925– Gale Gordon, guard
- 1925– Al Peterson, center
- 1930– Forrest Cox, guard
- 1932– Ted O'Leary, forward
- 1933– Bill Johnson, center
- 1936– Ray Ebling- forward
- 1937– Fred Pralle, guard
- 1942– Charles B. Black, forward
- 1942– Ray Evans, guard
- 1943– Ray Evans, guard
- 1946– Charles B. Black, forward
- 1947– Charles B. Black, forward
- 1950– Clyde Lovellette, center
- 1953– B. H. Born, center
- 1961– Bill Bridges, forward
- 1962– Jerry Gardner, guard
- 1965– Walt Wesley, center
- 1966– Walt Wesley, center
- 1968– Jo Jo White, guard
- 1969– Jo Jo White, guard
- 1970– Dave Robisch, forward
- 1971– Dave Robisch, forward
- 1972– Bud Stallworth, forward
- 1981– Darnell Valentine, guard
- 1986– Danny Manning, forward
- 2020– Udoka Azubuike, center

=== Academic All-Americans ===
- 1971 – Bud Stallworth
- 1974 – Tom Kivisto
- 1977 – Cris Barnthouse & Ken Koenigs
- 1978 – Ken Koenigs
- 1979 – Darnell Valentine
- 1980 – Darnell Valentine
- 1981 – Darnell Valentine
- 1982 – David Magley
- 1996 – Jacque Vaughn
- 1997 – Jacque Vaughn† & Jerod Haase
- 1999 – Ryan Robertson
- 2010 – Cole Aldrich†
- 2011 – Tyrel Reed

† indicates Academic All-American of the Year

=== National Player of the Year awards ===
- 1923 – Paul Endacott (Helms Foundation)
- 1924 – Charlie T. Black (Helms Foundation)
- 1952 – Clyde Lovellette (Helms Foundation)
- 1988 – Danny Manning (Wooden, NABC, Naismith)
- 2002 – Drew Gooden (NABC)
- 2003 – Nick Collison (NABC)
- 2017 – Frank Mason III (consensus)

=== Position Player of the Year Awards ===
Following the creation and success of the Bob Cousy Award, the Naismith Memorial Basketball Hall of Fame has presented an award for each of the five basketball positions since the end of the 2014-2015 season.

- 2017 – Frank Mason III (Bob Cousy Award, Point Guard of the Year)
- 2023 – Jalen Wilson (Julius Erving Award, Small Forward of the Year)

=== McDonald's All-Americans ===
The 50 McDonald's All-Americans listed below have played for Kansas. An asterisk, "*", Indicates player did not finish his college career at Kansas. A cross, "†", indicates player did not begin his college career at Kansas. The 2015 game had the most future Jayhawks playing in the game, with four; however, two players transferred to Kansas and one transferred out of Kansas. The 2022 game also had four players, but one transferred to Kansas and one transferred out of Kansas.

1970–1999

- 1977 – Darnell Valentine
- 1978 – Tony Guy
- 1979 – Ricky Ross*
- 1981 – Greg Dreiling†
- 1982 – Kerry Boagni*
- 1984 – Danny Manning
- 1985 – Rick Calloway†
- 1986 – Mark Randall
- 1987 – Mike Maddox
- 1990 – Darrin Hancock†
- 1991 – Calvin Rayford & Ben Davis*
- 1993 – Jacque Vaughn
- 1994 – Raef LaFrentz
- 1995 – Ryan Robertson & Paul Pierce
- 1996 – Lester Earl†
- 1997 – Kenny Gregory & Eric Chenowith
- 1998 – Jeff Boschee
- 1999 – Nick Collison

2000–2019

- 2001 – Wayne Simien & Aaron Miles
- 2003 – J. R. Giddens* & David Padgett*
- 2005 – Micah Downs*, Mario Chalmers & Julian Wright
- 2006 – Sherron Collins & Darrell Arthur
- 2007 – Cole Aldrich
- 2009 – Xavier Henry
- 2010 – Josh Selby
- 2012 – Perry Ellis
- 2013 – Wayne Selden, Jr. & Andrew Wiggins
- 2014 – Cliff Alexander & Kelly Oubre
- 2015 – Carlton Bragg*, Cheick Diallo, Malik Newman† & Dedric Lawson†
- 2016 – Udoka Azubuike & Josh Jackson
- 2018 – David McCormack, Quentin Grimes* & Devon Dotson

2020–present

- 2020 – Bryce Thompson*
- 2022 – Gradey Dick, M. J. Rice*, Ernest Udeh, Arterio Morris†*
- 2023 – Elmarko Jackson*
- 2024 – Flory Bidunga*
- 2025 – Darryn Peterson

=== Jayhawk basketball players notable in other fields ===
Below are any former Jayhawks who are notable in other fields. Included are the years they played basketball at Kansas and what they are notable for.

- Jim Bausch – Olympic decathlete – 1929–1931 – also a member of the College Football Hall of Fame
- Bob Dole – politician – 1941–1944 – also played football while at Kansas
- Walter Sutton – geneticist – 1898–1899

=== Retired jerseys ===
KU only retires the jerseys, and not the numbers, of past basketball players. Eight players honored played on one of KU's 5 championship teams. Thirty-three players have had their jersey retired by Kansas. One former announcer, Max Falkenstien, is honored with the retired jerseys as well. His number 60 was chosen because that was the number of years he was the radio announcer for the Jayhawks. Charlie T. Black and Paul Endacott are the only two players with their jerseys retired to play on two championship teams. Four players from the 2008 Championship have their jersey retired, which is the most players honored to be on a roster in any single season in Kansas basketball history.

Kansas Jayhawks retired jerseys
No.	Player	Position	Career
0	Drew Gooden	F	2000–02
0	Thomas Robinson	F	2009–12
4	Nick Collison	F	1999–2003
4	Sherron Collins ^{5}	G	2006–10
5	Fred Pralle	G	1936–38
5	Howard Engleman	F	1939–41
7	Tusten Ackerman ^{2}	C	1923–25
7	Dutch Lonborg	G	1917–20
8	Charlie T. Black ^{1} ^{2}	G	1922–24
10	Charles B. Black	F	1942–43, 1946–47
10	Kirk Hinrich	G	1999–2003
11	Jacque Vaughn	G	1994–97
12	Paul Endacott ^{1} ^{2}	G	1921–23
13	Wilt Chamberlain	C	1957–58
13	Walt Wesley	C	1964–66
14	Darnell Valentine	G	1978–81
15	Ray Evans	G	1942–43, 1946–47
15	Jo Jo White	G	1966–69
15	Bud Stallworth	F	1970–72
15	Mario Chalmers ^{5}	G	2006–08
16	Clyde Lovellette ^{3}	C	1950–52
22	Marcus Morris	F	2008–11
23	B.H. Born ^{3}	C	1952–54
23	Wayne Simien	F	2002–05
25	Danny Manning ^{4}	F	1985–88
25	Brandon Rush ^{5}	F	2005–08
26	Gale Gordon	G	1925–27
32	Bill Bridges	F	1959–61
33	Bill "Skinny" Johnson	C	1930–33
34	Paul Pierce	F	1995–98
36	Al Peterson	C	1925–27
40	Dave Robisch	F	1969–71
45	Raef LaFrentz	F	1994–98
45	Cole Aldrich ^{5}	C	2007–2010
60	Max Falkenstien	Announcer	1945–2006

Notes

- ^{1} Member of 1922 National Championship team
- ^{2} Member of 1923 National Championship team
- ^{3} Member of 1952 National Championship team
- ^{4} Member of 1988 National Championship team
- ^{5} Member of 2008 National Championship team

=== Jayhawks in the Naismith Memorial Basketball Hall of Fame ===
Twenty members of the Naismith Memorial Basketball Hall of Fame have been associated with the Kansas men's basketball team. This includes several players, Kansas head coaches, former Jayhawk players who have been inducted in other roles, and former assistant coaches.

==== Players ====
- Wilt Chamberlain
- Paul Endacott
- Bill Johnson
- Allen Kelley (enshrined as member of 1960 Olympic gold medal team)
- Clyde Lovellette
- Paul Pierce
- Jo Jo White

==== Jayhawk coaches ====
Below are Jayhawk head coaches in the Hall of Fame.

- Phog Allen (also a former player and former head coach of football team)
- Larry Brown
- Roy Williams
- Bill Self (also a former assistant coach)

==== Former players not enshrined as a player or Kansas coach ====
The following former players are enshrined in the Hall of Fame but not as a player or as a coach at Kansas.

- John Bunn, also freshmen team coach, enshrined as a contributor
- Dutch Lonborg, former athletic director, enshrined as a coach
- Ralph Miller, also a Kansas football player, enshrined as a coach
- Ernie Quigley, enshrined as a referee
- Adolph Rupp, enshrined as a coach
- Dean Smith, enshrined as a coach

==== Others ====
The following are people associated with Kansas basketball in some way that are in the Hall of Fame for a reason not already mentioned.

- John Calipari, assistant at Kansas from 1982 to 1985, enshrined as a head coach, primarily a college coach but had a brief stint in the NBA.
- James Naismith, head coach from 1898 to 1907, enshrined as inventor of the game, namesake for Hall of Fame
- Gregg Popovich, assistant at Kansas for 1986–87 season, enshrined as head coach in NBA

=== Jayhawks in the National Collegiate Basketball Hall of Fame ===
Multiple former Kansas players have been enshrined in the National Collegiate Basketball Hall of Fame. Some former players have been enshrined as players, while some former players have been enshrined as coaches.

==== Coaches ====
- Phog Allen, also a former player
- Larry Brown
- Roy Williams

==== Players ====
- Wilt Chamberlain
- Paul Endacott
- Bill Johnson
- Clyde Lovellette
- Danny Manning
- Paul Pierce

==== Former players inducted as coaches ====
- Dutch Lonborg, coached at McPherson, Washburn, and Northwestern
- Ralph Miller, coached at Wichita (now known as Wichita State), Iowa, and Oregon State
- Adolph Rupp, coached at Kentucky
- Dean Smith, coached at North Carolina

==== Contributors ====
- John Bunn, former basketball and football player, inducted as chairman of Naismith Memorial Basketball Hall of Fame
- James Naismith, former coach, inducted as inventor of basketball

=== Olympians ===
Below are Jayhawks who represented their country in the Olympic Games as a player or coach. Thirteen Jayhawks have been chosen to represent their home country in the Olympics. Only Sasha Kaun represented a country other than the United States when he represented Russia in 2012. Joel Embiid is the most recent Jayhawk to participate in the Olympics, and represented the United States in the 2024 Summer Olympics. Eleven have played in the Olympics, two coached, and one was selected but did not play due to a boycott, Darnell Valentine. The 1952 Olympic team featured seven Jayhawk players and a coach. Two former Jayhawk basketball players have coached in the Olympics. Current Jayhawk Johnny Furphy was on the final list for Australia for the 2024 Olympics.

Year	Player	Medal
1952	Phog Allen (assistant coach)	Gold medal
1952	Charlie Hoag	Gold medal
1952	Bill Hougland	Gold medal
1952	John Keller	Gold medal
1952	Dean Kelley	Gold medal
1952	Bob Kenney	Gold medal
1952	Bill Lienhard	Gold medal
1952	Clyde Lovellette	Gold medal
1956	Bill Hougland	Gold medal
1960	Allen Kelley	Gold medal
1968	Jo Jo White	Gold medal
1976	Dean Smith (head coach)	Gold medal
1980	Darnell Valentine	DNP
1988	Danny Manning	Bronze medal
2012	Sasha Kaun (Russia)	Bronze medal
2024	Joel Embiid	Gold medal

=== Presidential Medal of Freedom ===
The Presidential Medal of Freedom is the highest civilian honor in the United States and is awarded by the president. The award has been given to two former Kansas basketball players for contributions outside of the University of Kansas.

Player	Years at Kansas	Year given	President	Reason
Bob Dole	1941–1942	1997	Bill Clinton	Lengthy political career
Dean Smith	1949–1953	2013	Barack Obama	Charity work and accomplishments as North Carolina's men's basketball coach

=== Jayhawks in the NBA ===
The Jayhawks have multiple connections to the NBA. Below is a list of former players and coaches. People who are currently coaches or in management will show their current job, as well as how they are associated with Kansas basketball.

==== Current management ====
- R. C. Buford – general manager San Antonio Spurs, assistant coach 1983–1988
- Nick Collison – special assistant to general manager Oklahoma City Thunder, player 1999–2003
- Alvin Gentry - vice president of basketball engagement Sacramento Kings, assistant coach, 1986–89
- Kevin Pritchard – president of basketball operations Indiana Pacers, player 1986–1990

==== Coaches ====
- Greg Dreiling – scout, Dallas Mavericks, player 1983–86
- Michael Lee – scout, Golden State Warriors, played at Kansas 2001–05
- Aaron Miles – assistant coach, New Orleans Pelicans, played at Kansas 2001–05
- Gregg Popovich – head coach, San Antonio Spurs, volunteer assistant 1986–87 season
- Rex Walters – assistant coach, Charlotte Hornets, played at Kansas 1991–93

==== Current players ====
Below is a list of former Jayhawk basketball on NBA rosters. Free agents should not be included on the list. Players with an asterisk are players assigned to the G-League. In the offseason, players who were signed to a team's summer league roster should not be included.

- Christian Braun – Denver Nuggets
- Gradey Dick – Toronto Raptors
- Hunter Dickinson – New Orleans Pelicans
- Joel Embiid – Philadelphia 76ers
- Tristan Enaruna – Cleveland Cavaliers
- Johnny Furphy - Indiana Pacers
- Quentin Grimes – Los Angeles Lakers
- Sviatoslav Mykhailiuk – Utah Jazz
- Kelly Oubre Jr. – Philadelphia 76ers
- Andrew Wiggins – Miami Heat
- Jalen Wilson* — Atlanta Hawks

==== Recently became a free agent ====
This section lists former Jayhawks that were on an NBA roster during the 2025-2026 NBA season but are not on an NBA roster. Any players on this list who are not on a roster by the start of the season should be moved to former players. Players listed below may be under contract in an international league, but are not under contract in the NBA or the G-League.

- Ochai Agbaji, most recently played for the Brooklyn Nets
- Kevin McCullar Jr., most recently played for the New York Knicks

==== Former players ====
Below are former Jayhawks who spent three or more seasons in the NBA.

- Cole Aldrich (2010–18)
- Darrell Arthur (2008–18)
- Udoka Azubuike (2021-24)
- Charles B. Black (1948–51)
- Tarik Black (2014–18)
- Bill Bridges (1962–74)
- Walter Roger Brown (1972–79)
- Wilt Chamberlain (1959–72)
- Nick Collison (2003–18)
- Cheick Diallo (2016–22)
- Greg Dreiling (1986–96)
- Drew Gooden (2002–16)
- Devonte’ Graham (2019-24)
- Xavier Henry (2010–14)
- Wayne Hightower (1962–71)
- Kirk Hinrich (2003–16)
- Maury King (1959–62)
- Raef LaFrentz (1998–09)
- Clyde Lovellette (1953–63)
- Danny Manning (1988–02)
- Frank Mason III (2017–21)
- Paul Mokeski (1979–90)
- Greg Ostertag (1995–05)
- Paul Pierce (1998–17)
- Scot Pollard (1997–08)
- Kevin Pritchard (1990–95)
- Mark Randall (1991–94)
- Thomas Robinson (2012–17)
- Dave Robisch (1971–83)
- Brandon Rush (2008–17)
- Isaac Stallworth (1972–76)
- Billy Thomas (1999–08)
- Calvin Thompson (1983–86)
- Darnell Valentine (1981–90)
- Jacque Vaughn (1997–09)
- Rex Walters (1993–99)
- Walt Wesley (1966–75)
- Jo Jo White (1969–80)
- Jeff Withey (2013–17)
- Julian Wright (2007–11)

==== Draft history ====
- 94 total NBA draft picks
- 42 players drafted 30th or better, 43 if including territorial pick Wilt Chamberlain (equivalent to 1st round picks by modern draft standards)
- 47 players drafted 31–60th (equivalent to 2nd round picks by modern draft standards)

Territorial picks
From 1947 to 1965, the draft allowed teams not drawing fans to select a local player, in place of their first round pick.

Year	Player	Team
1959	Wilt Chamberlain	Philadelphia Warriors

Regular Draft

Year	Round	Pick	Overall	Player	Team
1947	–	–	–	Ray Evans	New York Knicks
1948	–	–	–	Otto Schnellbacher	Providence Steamrollers
1952	1	9	9	Clyde Lovellette	Minneapolis Lakers
1953	8	–	–	Dean Kelley	Fort Wayne Zollner Pistons
1953	11	–	32	Gil Reich	Boston Celtics
1954	3	4	22	B. H. Born	Fort Wayne Zollner Pistons
1954	7	2	56	Allen Kelley	Milwaukee Hawks
1957	6	8	48	Maury King	Boston Celtics
1959	10	6	71	Ron Loneski	St. Louis Hawks
1961	3	9	32	Bill Bridges	Chicago Packers
1962	1	5	5	Wayne Hightower	San Francisco Warriors
1963	4	2	28	Nolen Ellison	Baltimore Bullets
1965	8	7	68	George Unseld	Los Angeles Lakers
1966	1	6	6	Walt Wesley	Cincinnati Royals
1966	13	3	103	Al Lopes	Baltimore Bullets
1967	4	2	33	Ronald Franz	Detroit Pistons
1968	9	8	114	Roger Bohnenstiel	New York Knicks
1969	1	9	9	Jo Jo White	Boston Celtics
1969	4	5	48	Dave Nash	Chicago Bulls
1969	11	13	154	Bruce Sloan	Philadelphia 76ers
1971	3	9	44	Dave Robisch	Boston Celtics
1971	4	13	64	Walter Roger Brown	Los Angeles Lakers
1971	13	12	207	Pierre Russell	Milwaukee Bucks
1972	1	7	7	Bud Stallworth	Seattle SuperSonics
1972	14	4	184	Aubrey Nash	Baltimore Bullets
1975	7	2	110	Rick Suttle	Los Angeles Lakers
1975	8	18	144	Roger Morningstar	Boston Celtics
1976	1	16	16	Norm Cook	Boston Celtics
1977	7	14	124	Herb Nobles	Detroit Pistons
1978	5	11	99	Ken Koenigs	Cleveland Cavaliers
1978	6	8	118	John Douglas	New Orleans Jazz
1979	2	20	42	Paul Mokeski	Houston Rockets
1980	10	12	211	Randy Carroll	Phoenix Suns
1981	1	16	16	Darnell Valentine	Portland Trail Blazers
1981	3	1	47	Art Housey	Dallas Mavericks
1981	7	22	160	John Crawford	Philadelphia 76ers
1982	2	5	28	Dave Magley	Cleveland Cavaliers
1982	2	23	46	Tony Guy	Boston Celtics
1984	4	10	80	Carl Henry	Kansas City Kings
1984	9	1	185	Brian Martin	Indiana Pacers
1984	9	15	199	Kelly Knight	Utah Jazz
1986	2	2	26	Greg Dreiling	Indiana Pacers
1986	2	18	42	Ron Kellogg	Atlanta Hawks
1986	4	1	71	Calvin Thompson	New York Knicks
1988	1	1	1	Danny Manning	Los Angeles Clippers
1988	3	25	75	Archie Marshall	San Antonio Spurs
1990	2	7	34	Kevin Pritchard	Golden State Warriors
1991	1	26	26	Mark Randall	Chicago Bulls
1993	1	16	16	Rex Walters	New Jersey Nets
1993	2	15	42	Adonis Jordan	Seattle SuperSonics
1994	2	11	38	Darrin Hancock	Charlotte Hornets
1995	1	28	28	Greg Ostertag	Utah Jazz
1997	1	19	19	Scot Pollard	Detroit Pistons
1997	1	27	27	Jacque Vaughn	Utah Jazz
1998	1	3	3	Raef LaFrentz	Denver Nuggets
1998	1	10	10	Paul Pierce	Boston Celtics
1999	2	16	45	Ryan Robertson	Sacramento Kings
2001	2	14	45	Eric Chenowith	New York Knicks
2002	1	4	4	Drew Gooden	Memphis Grizzlies
2003	1	7	7	Kirk Hinrich	Chicago Bulls
2003	1	12	12	Nick Collison	Seattle SuperSonics
2005	1	29	29	Wayne Simien	Miami Heat
2007	1	13	13	Julian Wright	New Orleans Hornets
2008	1	13	13	Brandon Rush	Portland Trail Blazers
2008	1	27	27	Darrell Arthur	New Orleans Hornets
2008	2	4	34	Mario Chalmers	Minnesota Timberwolves
2008	2	22	52	Darnell Jackson	Miami Heat
2008	2	29	59	Sasha Kaun	Seattle SuperSonics
2010	1	11	11	Cole Aldrich	New Orleans Hornets
2010	1	12	12	Xavier Henry	Memphis Grizzlies
2011	1	13	13	Markieff Morris	Phoenix Suns
2011	1	14	14	Marcus Morris	Houston Rockets
2011	2	19	49	Josh Selby	Memphis Grizzlies
2012	1	5	5	Thomas Robinson	Sacramento Kings
2012	2	11	41	Tyshawn Taylor	Brooklyn Nets
2013	1	7	7	Ben McLemore	Sacramento Kings
2013	2	9	39	Jeff Withey	Portland Trail Blazers
2014	1	1	1	Andrew Wiggins	Cleveland Cavaliers
2014	1	3	3	Joel Embiid	Philadelphia 76ers
2015	1	15	15	Kelly Oubre	Atlanta Hawks
2016	2	3	33	Cheick Diallo	Los Angeles Clippers
2017	1	4	4	Josh Jackson	Phoenix Suns
2017	2	4	34	Frank Mason III	Sacramento Kings
2018	2	4	34	Devonte' Graham	Atlanta Hawks
2018	2	17	47	Sviatoslav Mykhailiuk	Los Angeles Lakers
2020	1	27	27	Udoka Azubuike	Utah Jazz
2022	1	14	14	Ochai Agbaji	Cleveland Cavaliers
2022	1	21	21	Christian Braun	Denver Nuggets
2023	1	13	13	Gradey Dick	Toronto Raptors
2023	2	21	51	Jalen Wilson	Brooklyn Nets
2024	2	5	35	Johnny Furphy	Indiana Pacers
2024	2	26	56	Kevin McCullar Jr.	New York Knicks
2026	1	2	2	Darryn Peterson	Utah Jazz

=== NBA Award winners ===
Below are Jayhawks who have won an award in the NBA such as MVP or Rookie of the Year. Not included are Jayhawks who made All-Star or All-NBA teams, or Jayhawks who have won All-Star game MVP, the dunk contest, or three-point contest. Eleven times a Jayhawk has won a major award, and six different Jayhawks have won awards. The only major award a Jayhawk has never won is Defensive Player of the Year. Wilt Chamberlain won an award six times during his career, including four MVP Awards. Joel Embiid is the most recent winner of an award-winning league MVP for the 2022–23, the second Jayhawk to win that award, along with Chamberlain, who also won the award with the Philadelphia 76ers.

Season	Player	Team	Award
1959–60	Wilt Chamberlain	Philadelphia Warriors	MVP; Rookie of the Year
1965–66	Wilt Chamberlain	Philadelphia 76ers	MVP
1966–67	Wilt Chamberlain	Philadelphia 76ers	MVP
1967–68	Wilt Chamberlain	Philadelphia 76ers	MVP
1971–72	Wilt Chamberlain	Los Angeles Lakers	NBA Finals MVP
1975–76	Jo Jo White	Boston Celtics	NBA Finals MVP
1997–98	Danny Manning	Phoenix Suns	Sixth Man of the Year
2007–08	Paul Pierce	Boston Celtics	NBA Finals MVP
2014–15	Andrew Wiggins	Minnesota Timberwolves	Rookie of the Year
2022–23	Joel Embiid	Philadelphia 76ers	MVP

=== Current Jayhawk college coaches ===
Division I head coaches – former players

- Tad Boyle, Colorado

Division I head coaches – former players and assistant coaches

- Jerod Haase, Stanford

Women's Division I head coaches

- Terry Nooner, Wichita State

Division I assistants – former players

- Jeremy Case, Kansas
- Danny Manning, Louisville
- Evan Manning, Gonzaga

=== Jayhawks in the NBA G-League ===
Below are former Jayhawks under contract with a G-League team but are not on a two-way contract with an NBA team.

- Tarik Black – Grand Rapids Gold
- Mario Chalmers – Sioux Falls Skyforce
- Cheick Diallo – Motor City Cruise
- Devon Dotson – Windy City Bulls
- Marcus Garrett – Sioux Falls Skyforce
- Frank Mason III – South Bay Lakers
- Malik Newman – Cleveland Charge

== NCAA records ==
=== Active streak ===
- Most consecutive coaches leading team to Final Four: 6

=== Team ===
- Largest unranked-to-ranked jump: From unranked to No. 4 after beating No. 1 (UNLV), No. 2 (LSU), and No. 25 (SJU) in the 1989 preseason NIT.
- Most wins over an opponent in a single calendar year: 5 (over Nebraska in 1909 and Kansas State in 1935)
- Consecutive regular season conference championships: 13, 2005 to 2017 (tied)
- Consecutive weeks ranked in AP poll: 231, February 2, 2009, to February 8, 2021
- 25+ win seasons: 15, 2005–06 season to 2016–17*
- 20+ win seasons: 28, 1989–90 season to 2016–17*
- Consecutive NCAA Tournament appearances: 27, 1990–2017*

*Streak has officially ended; however, it was ended due to the NCAA vacating wins. The streak would be active if their wins were not vacated.

=== Individual ===
- Career games scoring in double figures: 132, Danny Manning
- Rebounds in first career game: 31, Wilt Chamberlain, vs. Northwestern, December 5, 1956
- Most blocks in a single NCAA tournament: 31, Jeff Withey

=== Other ===
- Most winning seasons: 101
- Most non-losing seasons (.500 or better): 104
- Most regular season conference championships: 61
- Most Consensus first-team All-Americans: 23
- Most Consensus first-team All-American selections: 30

== See also ==
- NCAA Men's Division I Final Four appearances by coaches
- NCAA Men's Division I Final Four appearances by school
- List of teams with the most victories in NCAA Division I men's college basketball
- NCAA Men's Division I Basketball Tournament Consecutive Appearances
