= Fred Pralle =

American basketball player

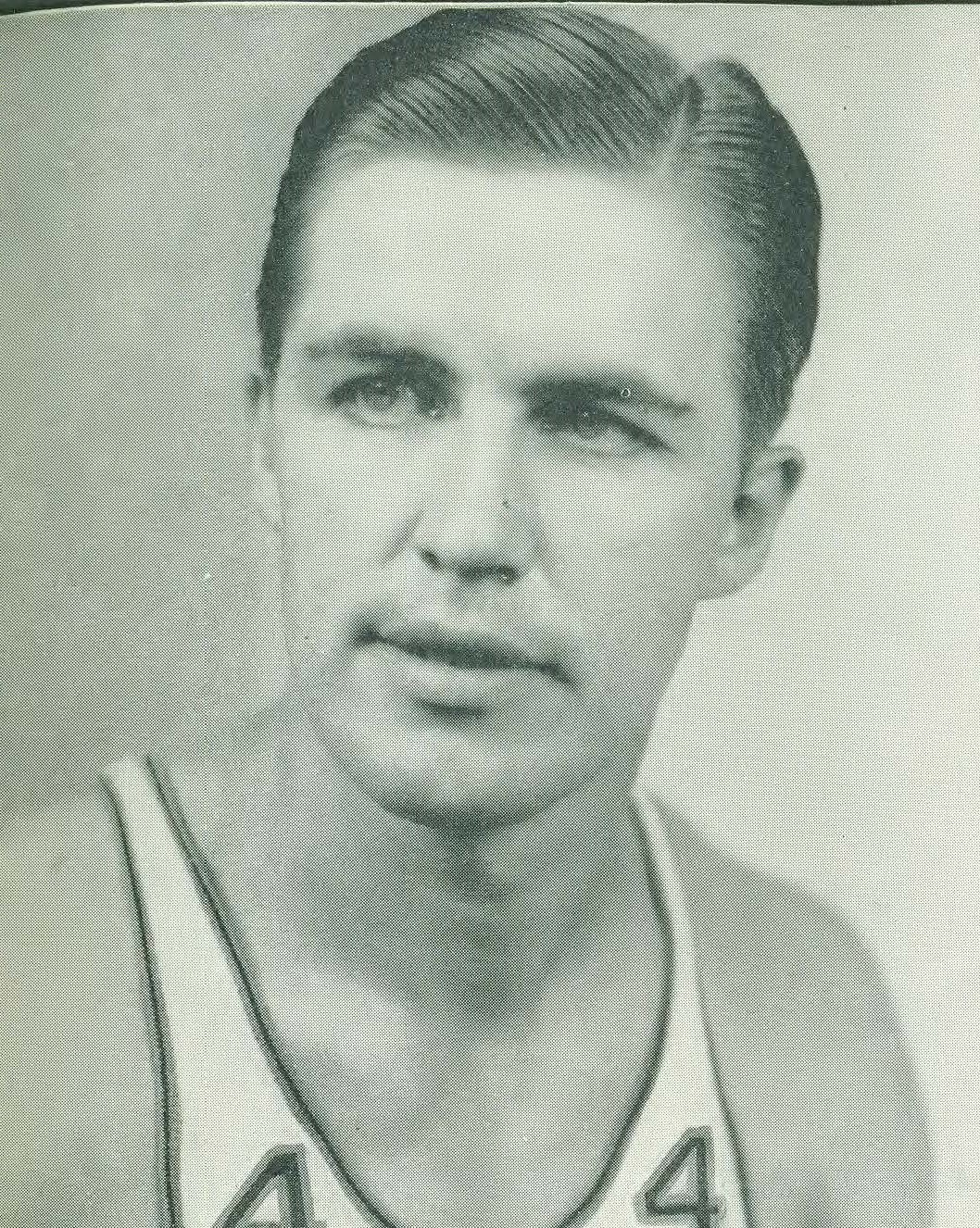
- Pralle with the Phillips 66ers

Personal information
- Born: April 10, 1916 St. Louis, Missouri, U.S.
- Died: November 6, 1998 (aged 82) Gainesville, Florida, U.S.
- Listed height: 6 ft 0 in (1.83 m)

Career information
- High school: St. Louis (St. Louis, Missouri)
- College: Kansas (1935–1938)
- Position: Guard
- Number: 5

Career history
- 1938–1945: Phillips 66ers

Career highlights
- AAU All-American (1944); 3× AAU National champion; Consensus All-American (1938); 3× All-Big Six (1936–1938); No. 5 retired by Kansas Jayhawks

Fred J. Pralle (April 10, 1916 – November 6, 1998) was an American college basketball standout at the University of Kansas from 1935to 1938. In his three varsity seasons, Kansas won all three Big Six Conference regular season championships. Pralle led the Jayhawks in scoring in each of his last two seasons, and as a senior he also led the conference in scoring with a 10.7 points per game average. He was twice named an NCAA All-American (1937, 1938), and in 1938 he became Kansas' first ever play to be honored as a consensus All-American.

After his collegiate career, Pralle played in the Amateur Athletic Union (AAU) with the national AAU power Phillips 66ers. During his seven-year career with the team, the 66ers won three national championships (1940, 1943–44) and were runners-up in two others (1939, 1942). Pralle sustained a knee injury just before the 1945 AAU Tournament derailed his basketball career. He eventually played baseball in the Kansas–Oklahoma–Missouri League with the Bartlesville Oilers before quitting professional sports.

Pralle died on November 6, 1998.
