= Frank Maze =

American football player and coach (1919–1971)

Biographical details
- Born: November 16, 1919; New York, New York, U.S.
- Died: January 10, 1971 (aged 51); Suffern, New York, U.S.
- Education: Syracuse University (1942)

Playing career
- 1939–1941: Syracuse
- Position: Guard

Coaching career (HC unless noted)

Football
- 1942: Van Hornesville Central HS (NY)
- 1946–1949: Wesleyan (line)
- 1950–1951: Dickinson
- 1952–1955: Colby
- 1956–1957: Lehigh (freshmen)
- 1958–1960: Haverstraw-Stony Point HS (assistant)
- 1961–1963: West Orange HS (NJ)

Wrestling
- 1942–1943: Van Hornesville Central HS (NY)
- 1946–1949: Wesleyan
- 1956–1958: Lehigh
- 1961–1964: Montclair State

Track
- 1942–1943: Van Hornesville Central HS (NY)
- 1946–1949: Wesleyan
- 1961–1964: West Orange HS (NJ)

Men's lacrosse
- 1957–1958: Lehigh

Head coaching record
- Overall: 13–27 (college football); 4–16–1 (college lacrosse)

Frank Richard Maze, born Francis Richard Mazejko (November 16, 1919 – January 10, 1971) was an American football player and coach. He served as the head football coach at Dickinson College from 1950 to 1951 and at Colby College from 1952 to 1955.

== Biography ==
Maze was born in New York City and was an all-city guard at Theodore Roosevelt High School. He attended Syracuse University and played guard for the Syracuse Orange football team from 1939 through 1941. He is one of only 25 Syracuse players to wear the number 44, which was retired in 2005 in honor of Jim Brown, Ernie Davis, and Floyd Little. He was also a member of the school's wrestling team and was named the most outstanding member of the team in 1942. He graduated from Syracuse in 1942 with a B.S. in physical education and earned an M.S. in education from Syracuse in 1948.

Maze began his coaching career at the Van Hornesville Central School in Van Hornesville, New York, where he was the athletic director and football, wrestling, and track coach. In 1943, he returned to Syracuse as an athletic instructor. In 1944, he joined the United States Navy and was an athletic specialist at Cornell and St. Lawrence universities and the Bainbridge and Sampson Naval Training Centers. Maze was discharged in February 1946 and became the head wrestling and assistant football and track coach at Wesleyan University. He was the line coach during Wesleyan's undefeated 1946, 1947, and 1948 football seasons.

In 1950, Maze was named head football coach at Dickinson College. Following the death of Chick Kennedy in 1951, he was appointed acting athletic director and head of the physical education department. He also served as head coach of the baseball team. He resigned in May 1952 and was succeeded by Alured Ransom. In his two seasons as football coach, Dickinson went 6–9.

On June 25, 1952, Colby College president J. Seelye Bixler announced that Maze would be the school's next football coach. Over four seasons, Maze compiled a 7–18 record. He also coached intramural wrestling, freshmen baseball, and varsity skiing. Following the 1955 football season, Maze announced he would leave the school when his contract expired on August 1, 1956.

After leaving Colby, Maze became the freshman football and wrestling and varsity lacrosse coach at Lehigh University. From 1958 to 1961, he was a teacher and assistant football coach at Haverstraw-Stony Point High School. From 1961 to 1964 he was a teacher and coach at West Orange High School in West Orange, New Jersey and the wrestling coach at Montclair State University. He then worked as a guidance counselor at Marlboro Central School in Marlboro, New York.

Maze died of a heart attack on January 10, 1971 at Good Samaritan Hospital in Suffern, New York.
