= Creamery Falls =

- Location within New York
- Location: Van Hornesville, New York
- Coordinates: 42.89844°N 74.82130°W
- Watercourse: Otsquago Creek

Creamery Falls is a waterfall located on Otsquago Creek north of Van Hornesville, New York in Herkimer County.
