= Valley Brook =

Valley Brook may refer to:

- Valley Brook, New York
- Valley Brook, Oklahoma
