= 1923 Pittsburgh Panthers football team =

American college football season

1923 Pittsburgh Panthers football
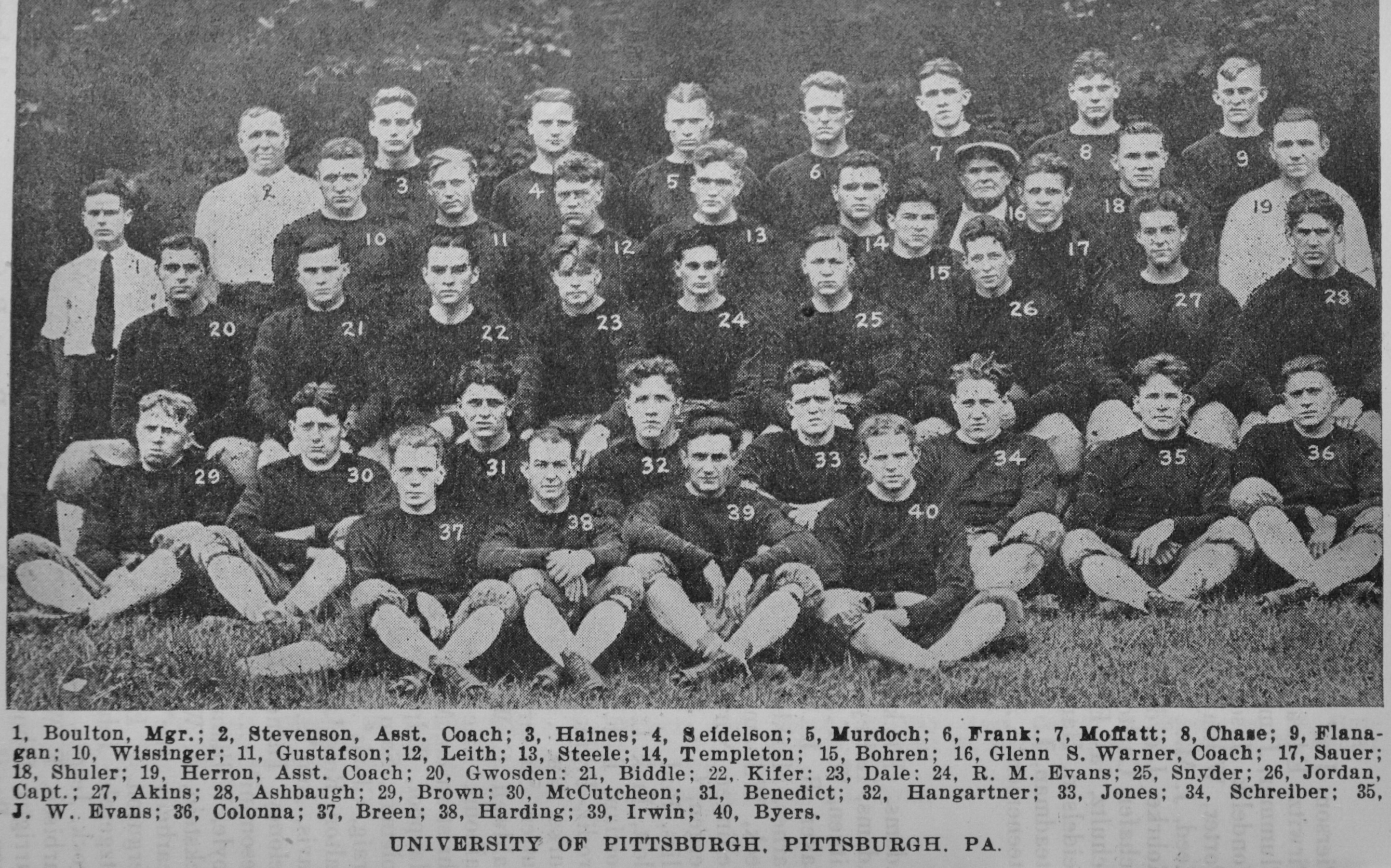
- Conference: Independent
- Record: 5–4
- Head coach: Pop Warner (9th season)
- Captain: Lloyd Jordan
- Home stadium: Forbes Field

1923 Eastern college football independents records
	Conf.			Overall
Team	W	L	T	W		L		T
Cornell		–		8	–	0	–	0
Yale		–		8	–	0	–	0
St. John's		–		5	–	0	–	1
Dartmouth		–		8	–	1	–	0
Syracuse		–		8	–	1	–	0
Boston College		–		7	–	1	–	1
Rutgers		–		7	–	1	–	1
Washington & Jefferson		–		6	–	1	–	1
Holy Cross		–		8	–	2	–	0
Lafayette		–		6	–	1	–	2
Tufts		–		6	–	2	–	0
Army		–		6	–	2	–	1
Colgate		–		6	–	2	–	1
Geneva		–		6	–	2	–	1
Lehigh		–		6	–	2	–	1
NYU		–		6	–	2	–	1
Penn State		–		6	–	2	–	1
Vermont		–		6	–	3	–	1
Brown		–		6	–	4	–	0
Harvard		–		4	–	3	–	1
Carnegie Tech		–		4	–	3	–	1
Penn		–		5	–	4	–	0
Pittsburgh		–		5	–	4	–	0
Bucknell		–		4	–	4	–	1
Columbia		–		4	–	4	–	1
Duquesne		–		4	–	4	–	0
Princeton		–		3	–	3	–	1
Franklin & Marshall		–		3	–	5	–	1
Drexel		–		2	–	6	–	0
Buffalo		–		2	–	5	–	1
Fordham		–		2	–	7	–	0
Boston University		–		1	–	6	–	0
Villanova		–		0	–	7	–	1
Temple		–		0	–	5	–	0
CCNY		–		0	–	7	–	0
Springfield		–		0	–	7	–	0

The 1923 Pittsburgh Panthers football team was an American football team that represented the University of Pittsburgh as an independent during the 1923 college football season. In its ninth and final season under head coach Pop Warner, the team compiled a 5–4 record and outscored opponents by a total of 83 to 45. The team played its home games at Forbes Field in Pittsburgh.

== Schedule ==
Date	Opponent	Site	Result	Attendance	Source
September 29	at Bucknell	Lewisburg, PA	W 21–0	10,000	
October 6	Lafayette	Forbes Field; Pittsburgh, PA	W 7–0	18,000	
October 13	West Virginia	Forbes Field; Pittsburgh, PA (rivalry)	L 7–13	30,000	
October 20	vs. Syracuse	Yankee Stadium; New York, NY	L 0–3	22,000	
October 27	Carnegie Tech	Forbes Field; Pittsburgh, PA	L 2–7	30,000	
November 3	at Penn	Franklin Field; Philadelphia, PA	L 0–6	46,000	
November 10	Grove City	Forbes Field; Pittsburgh, PA	W 13–7	10,000	
November 17	Washington & Jefferson	Forbes Field; Pittsburgh, PA	W 13–6	31,000	
November 29	Penn State	Forbes Field; Pittsburgh, PA (rivalry)	W 20–3	33,000	

== Preseason ==
The 1922 Pitt Panther football entourage returned from its victorious west coast trip and was feted at a gala banquet on January 10 with more than a thousand students and alumni in attendance. The lettermen received their "P" and All-American center Charles Bowser was elected captain for the 1923 season. On May 17 the Athletic Committee passed an amendment to the eligibility rules, "whereby an absolute three-year rule was made effective for all men in athletics at the local school. This ruling puts the Panthers on the highest possible plane of eligibility, all other sportsmanlike standards of play already being a part of the sports code of the local university." This rule prohibited Bowser, All-American guard Jack Sack and tackle Cullen Gourley from participating on the 1923 football squad. The lettermen called a special meeting and elected end Lloyd Jordan to be captain for the 1923 season. Lloyd also participated in basketball, baseball and track for the Panthers.

In December 1922 the University of Pittsburgh Athletic Council "appointed a committee to confer with Dr. John B. 'Jock' Sutherland, with a view to securing him as head coach when Glenn Warner leaves in 1924." On January 18 the Athletic Council of the University of Pittsburgh approved the contract with Dr. John B. Sutherland to coach the varsity football team for three years (1924-1926).

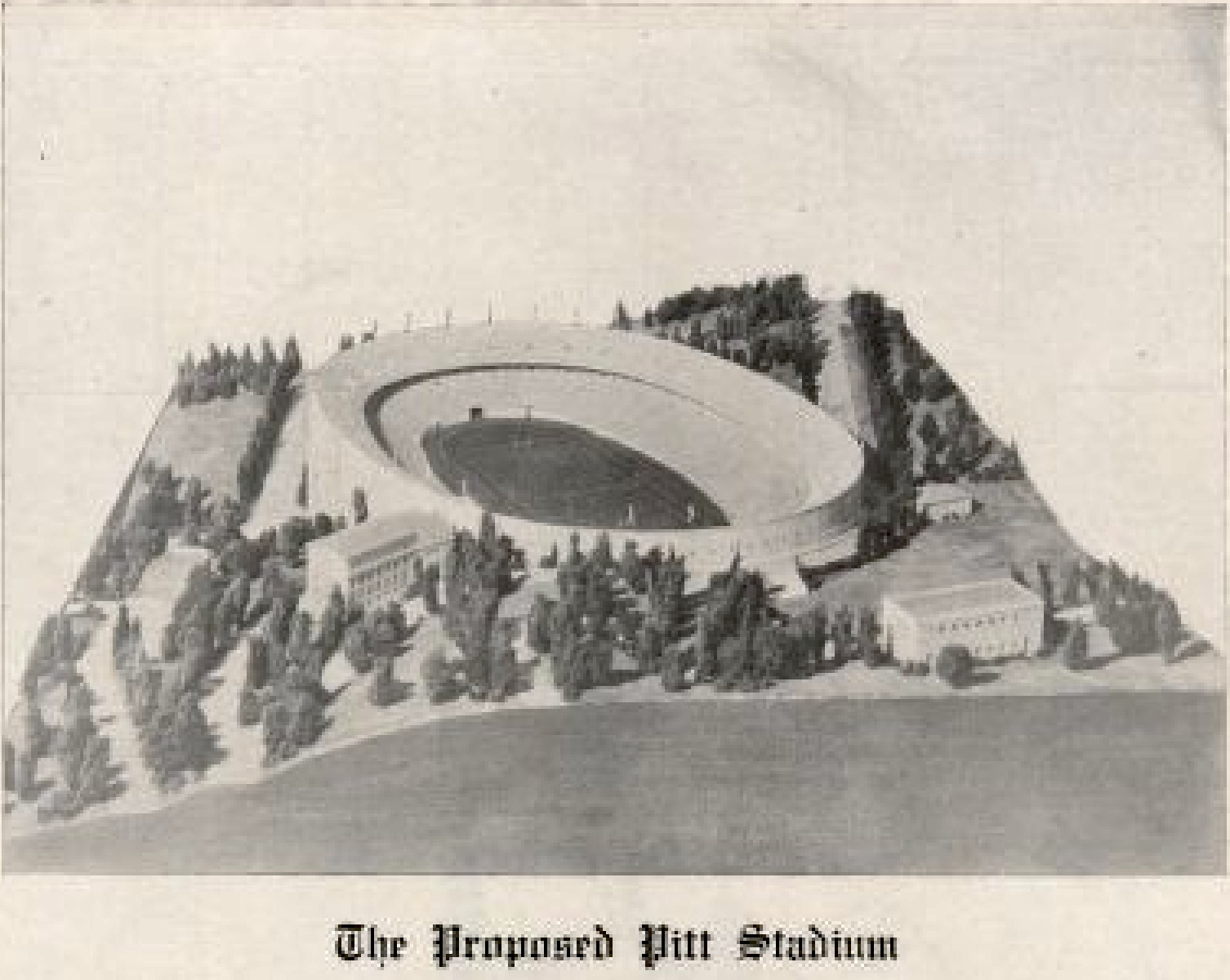
Artist's rendering of proposed Pitt Stadium

The Athletic Council announced in February that they secured property adjoining Trees Field for a probable stadium. In August they announced that they would erect a modern stadium seating at least 60,000. "The engineering plans are complete...The ordinance vacating unused portions of three streets was introduced in city council ...with expectation that it will be passed promptly, and it is now stated that immediately on receipt of this assurance from the city fathers the contract for grading will be awarded and work commenced. It is planned to complete all grading this year, so that the field will be in readiness for the erection of the huge steel and concrete stands as soon as the weather breaks next spring. 'The Pitt schedule for 1924 is being planned to be played in the new stadium.' declares Manager Davis."

Graduate Manager Karl E. Davis booked a nine game schedule for 1923 that Coach Warner described "the hardest any football team in the country had ever attempted." The 1923 schedule was similar to the 1922 slate except for Carnegie Tech and Grove City replacing Geneva and Cincinnati. The Syracuse game was scheduled to be played in the new Yankee Stadium in New York City on October 20.

Pat Herron, after a one year stint as Indiana head coach, returned to Warner's staff as an assistant and Reginald French Boulton was appointed student manager for the 1923 season.

Coach Warner's last session at Camp Hamilton began on September 5 and ended on September 21 with 40 Panthers vying for a position on the 1923 roster. Only halfback William Flanagan and end Carl Sauer remained from the starting lineup in the 1922 Penn State game. Thus, the camp schedule was much harder than normal, "because Coach Warner had so many places to fill and it was necessary for him to ascertain right off the reel just what each of the candidates possessed in the way of ability." He admitted that: "The boys have all shown the proper spirit, have been eager to learn, have gone about their work with a fine display of spirit, and have learned rapidly. A lot of them are still green and it will take some games to knock the rough spots off of them."

On September 3 "after twelve years of faithful service to the University, Charles S. Miller, Director of Athletics has resigned. The news of his resignation came as a sad blow to the athletes and students of Pitt. Charles S. Miller was the sponsor of the 'one-year residence', 'the 'Degree' and the 'Three-year' rules, which have gone so far to give Pitt recognized standing throughout the country and have been adopted by the larger eastern schools."

== Coaching staff ==
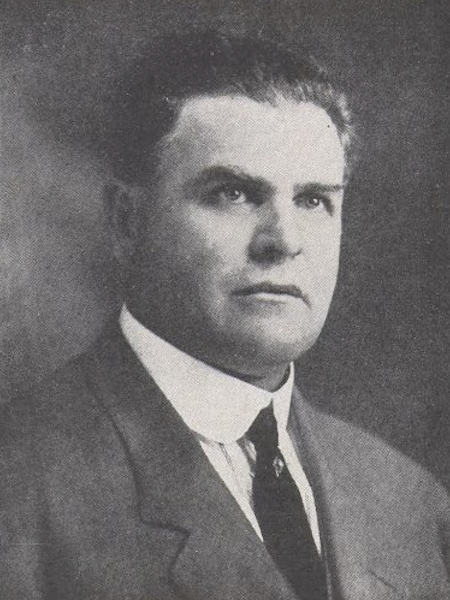
Coach Warner

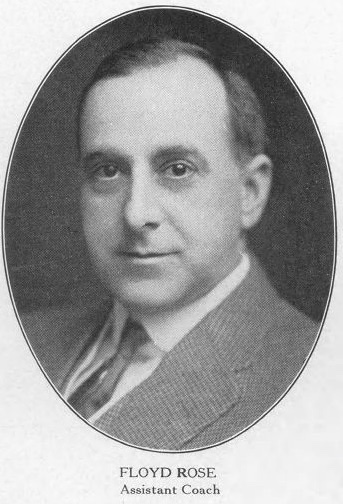
Floyd Rose

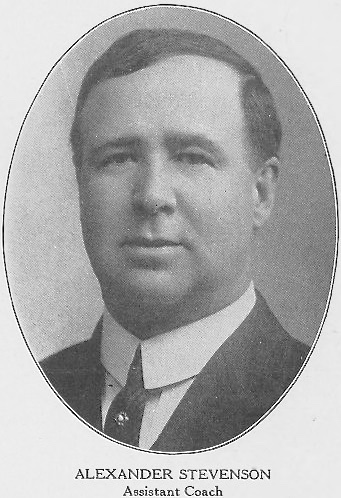
Alexander Stevenson

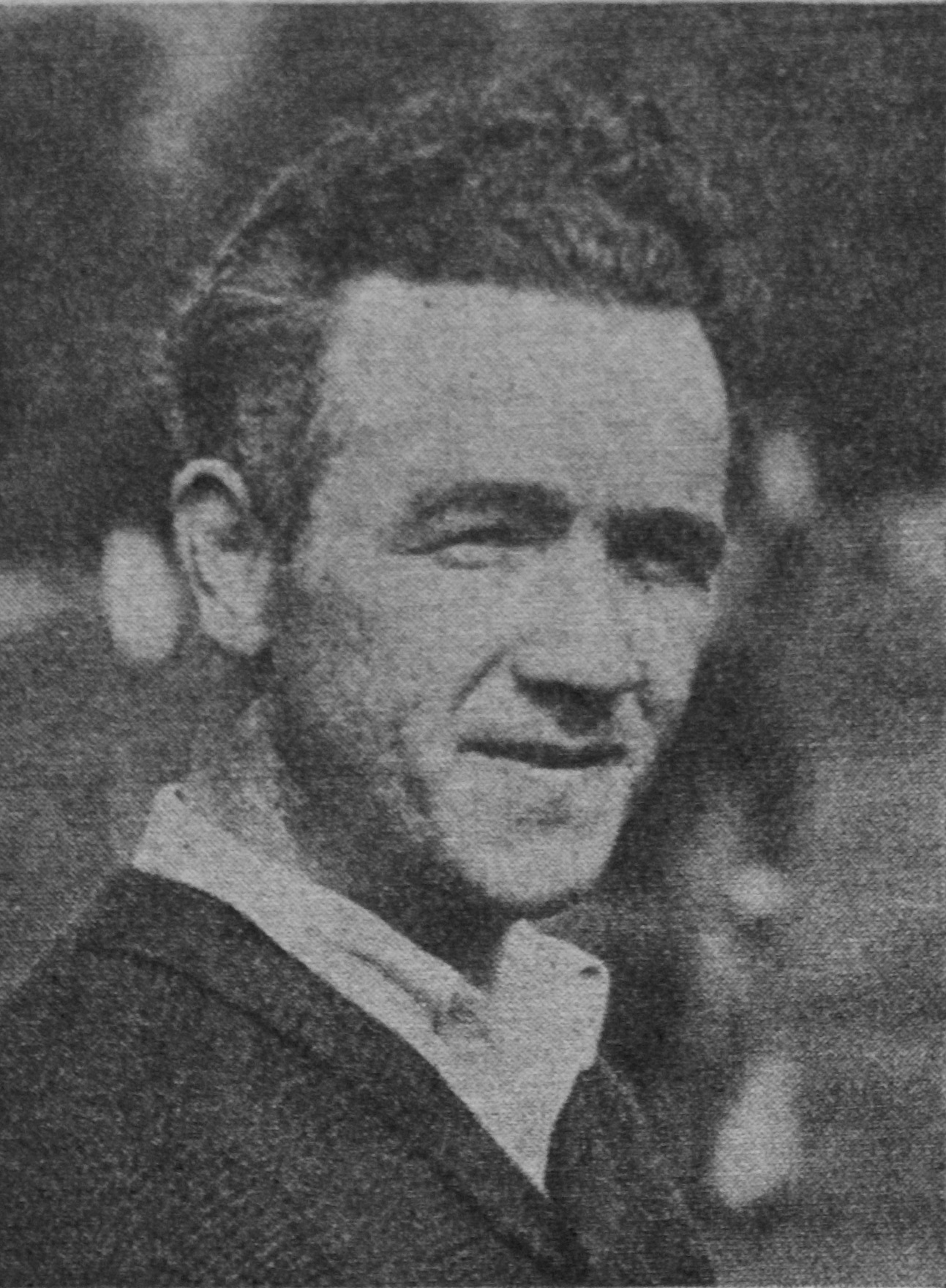
Pat Herron

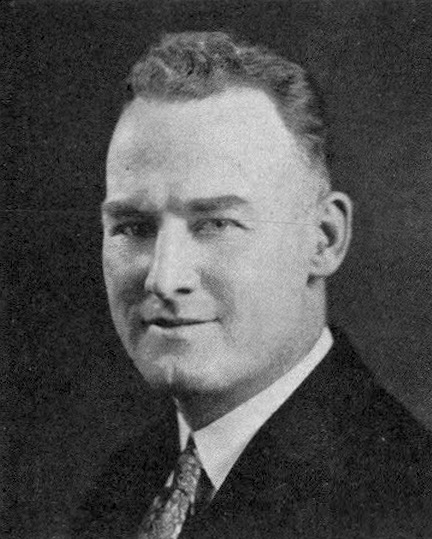
H. Clifford Carlson

1923 Pittsburgh Panthers football staff
Coaching staff: Pop Warner – Head coach; Floyd Rose – Assistant coach; Alexander Stevenson – Assistant coach; Pat Herron – Assistant coach; H. Clifford Carlson – Freshman coach	Support staff: R. French Boulton– student football manager; J. Hubert Wagner – team physician; Ollie DeVictor – team trainer; Karl E. Davis – graduate manager of athletics

== Roster ==
1923 Pittsburgh Panthers football roster
Player	Position	Games	Height	Weight	Class	Prep School	Hometown
Lloyd Jordan*	end	9	5' 10"	178	1924	Punxutawney H. S.	Punxutawney PA
Harold Akins*	tackle	5	5' 10"	198	1925	Bellefonte Academy	Alliance, Ohio
William Ashbaugh*	center	5	5' 10"	170	1925	Bellefonte Academy	Washington, PA
Frank J. Benedict	center	0	5' 11"	163	1926	Midland H. S.	Midland, PA
Kenneth Biddle	guard	0	5' 10"	196	1924	Crafton H. S.	Crafton, PA
Karl Bohren*	halfback	8	5' 8"	157	1925	Reynoldsville H. S.	Reynoldsville, PA
James N. Breen	center	0	5' 7"	168	1925	New Brighton H. S.	New Brighton, PA
Jesse J. Brown*	halfback	7	5' 10"	170	1926	Nichols H. S.	Buffalo, NY
Franklin E. Byers*	halfback	7	5' 11"	155	1924	Turtle Creek H. S.	Turtle Creek, PA
Ralph Chase*	tackle	8	6' 3"	202	1926	Wyoming Seminary	Wilkes Barre, PA
Nicolas Colonna*	fullback	8	5' 8"	167	1924	Woodlawn H. S.	Woodlawn, PA
John W. Evans	halfback	1	5' 6"	155	1925	Duquesne H. S.	Duquesne, PA
Ralph M. Evans	halfback	0	5' 11"	149	1926	McKees Rocks H. S.	McKees Rocks, PA
William Flanagan*	halfback	8	6'	160	1925	Buckhannon H. S.	Buckhannon, WV
Noble L. Frank*	tackle	9	6'	177	1925	Harrisburg Central H. S.	Harrisburg, PA
Andrew C. Gustafson*	fullback	7	6'	189	1926	West Aurora H. S.	Aurora, IL
Milo Gwosden*	end	9	6'	176	1925	Indiana Normal	Woodlawn, PA
William Haines	end	2	6'	160	1924	Crafton H. S.	Crafton, PA
Ulhardt Hangartner	guard	0	5' 11"	186	1925	Schenley H. S.	Pittsburgh, PA
John J. Harding	halfback	2	5' 9"	154	1926	Wyoming Seminary	Wyoming, PA
Robert Irwin	halfback	1	5' 11"	156	1926	Bellefonte H. S.	Bellefonte, PA
Marsh Johnson*	fullback	8	6' 2"	180	1925	Bellefonte Academy	Jamestown, NY
Ben Jones	end	0	5' 10"	164	1926	Schenley H. S.	Pittsburgh, PA
John J. Kifer	center	0	5' 11"	163	1926	Irwin H. S.	Norwin, PA
Alvar T. Leith	tackle	0	6' 1"	179	1926	South Hills H. S.	Pittsburgh, PA
Karl McCutcheon	halfback	0	5' 9"	148	1926	East Liverpool H. S.	East Liverpool, OH
John D. Moffatt	tackle	0	6' 2"	171	1926	Allegheny H. S.	Pittsburgh, PA
Thomas Murdoch*	tackle	6	5' 11"	183	1925	Schenley H.S.	Pittsburgh PA
Carl Sauer*	end	6	5' 11"	166	1925	West Central H. S.	Cleveland, OH
Harry Seidelson*	guard	8	6' 1"	184	1924	Fifth Avenue H. S.	Pittsburgh, PA
Nick Shuler*	quarterback	9	5' 11"	178	1924	Elwood City H. S.	Elwood City, PA
John B. Shumaker	tackle	0	5' 11"	172	1925	Rochester H. S.	Huntingdon, PA
Wendell Steele	tackle	0	6' 2"	183	1926	South Hills H. S.	Pittsburgh, PA
Paul S. Templeton*	tackle	8	6'	197	1926	Greenville H. S.	Transfer, PA
Charles Williams*	halfback	2	5' 7"	167	1924	Wellsburg H. S.	Wellsburg, WVA
Zoner A. Wissinger*	tackle	9	6'	183	1926	Greenville H. S.	Greenville, PA
Reginald French Boulton*	manager				1924	Beaver H. S.	Beaver, PA
* Letterman

== Game summaries ==
=== At Bucknell ===
Week 1: Pitt at Bucknell

Team	1	2	3	4	Total
• Pitt	0	0	7	14	21
Bucknell	0	0	0	0	0

- Date: September 29, 1923
- Location: Tustin Field
  Lewisburg, PA
- Game start: 3:00 p.m.
- Game attendance: 10,000
- Game weather: hot
- Referee: A. H. Sharpe (Yale)

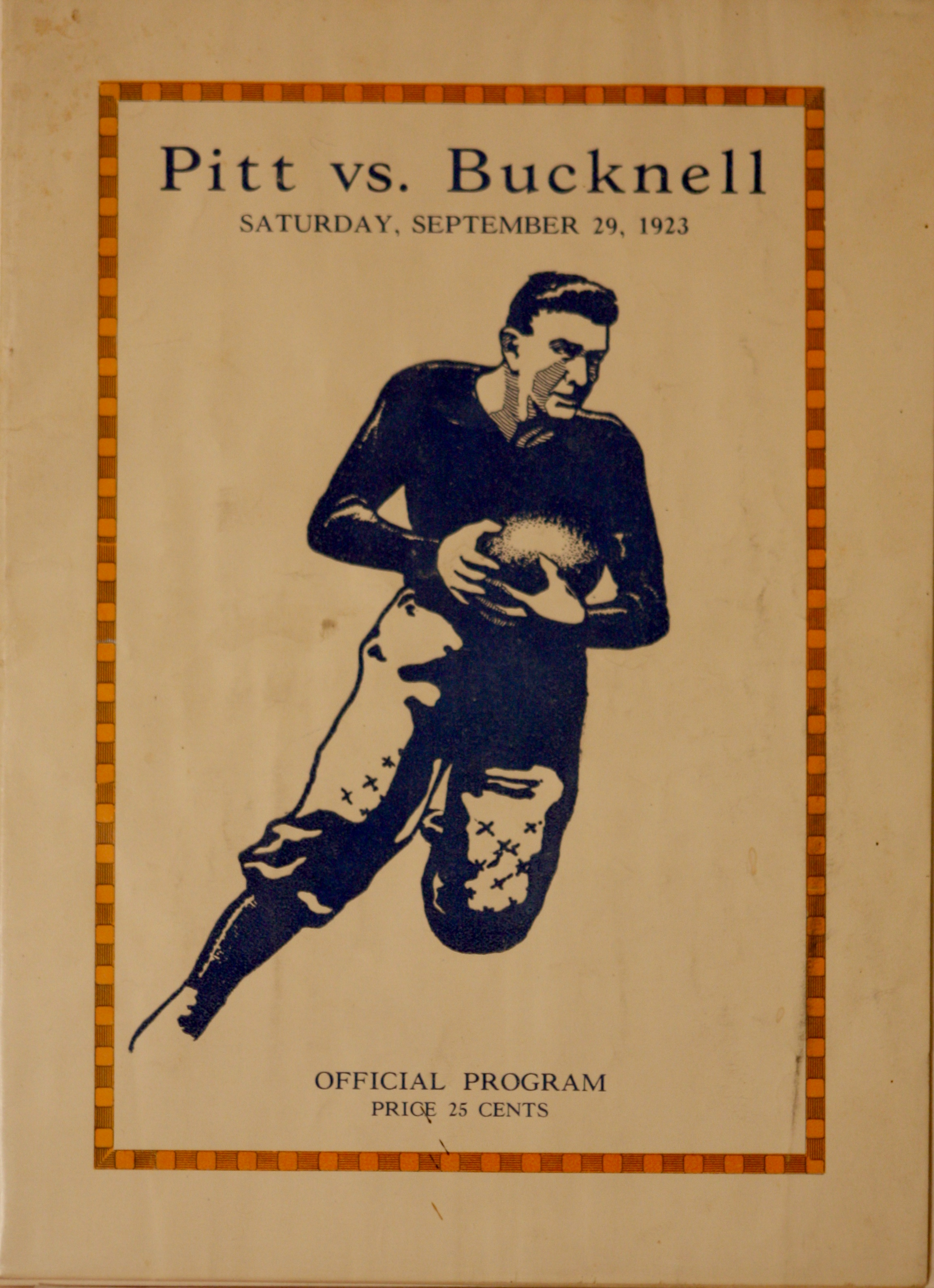
Program for September 29, 1923 Pitt vs. Bucknell game

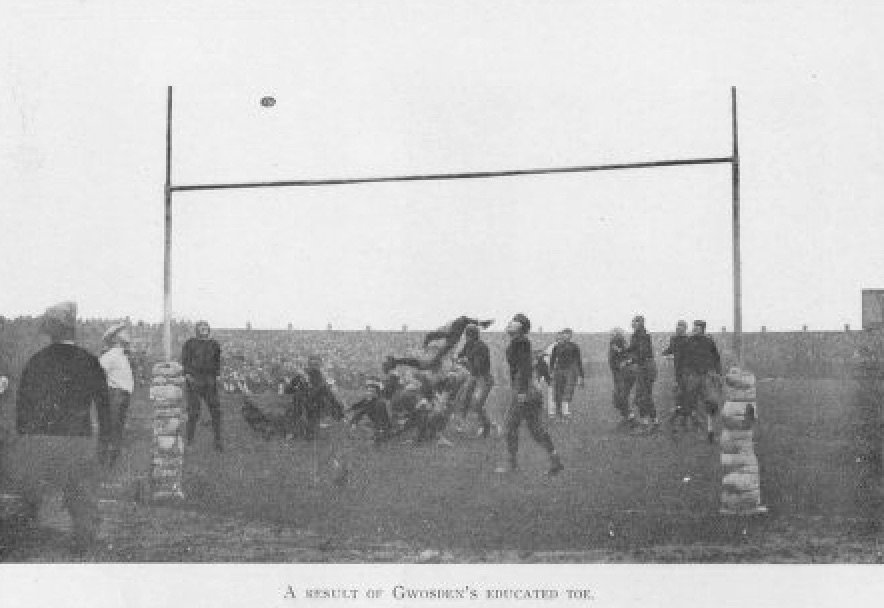
Photo from September 29, 1923 Pitt vs. Bucknell game

The Pitt Panther eleven ventured to Lewisburg, PA, for the first time ever, to open the 1923 football season against Bucknell led by fifth year coach Pete Reynolds. The Panthers and Bucknell would not meet again on the gridiron until 1945, which would be the final game in the series.

Coach Warner wrote in his column for The Pittsburgh Press: "This year I think Pitt will be very fortunate if she wins over half her games. There are nine games on the list, and I firmly believe we will be lucky if we do not lose more than four of them....All that has been done is to build an entirely new line with the exception of one end and an entirely new backfield with the exception of one halfback. Pitt is up against a real team in Bucknell. The Panthers were fortunate to win this game last season by the margin of a touchdown....Playing the game on Bucknell's field is to her advantage...If Pitt can get by this game without a licking, I will feel greatly relieved. Pitt's team is untried, inexperienced and green."

The Lewisburg Journal reported: "The Bucknell football team, after outplaying and holding to a scoreless tie the heavier, more experienced University of Pittsburgh team during the first half of Saturday's gridiron battle, succumbed during the two closing periods to the Pitt aerial attack and Gustafson's terrific line plunging, and finished on the short end of a 21 to 0 score."

Bucknell outfought the Panthers in the first half. Bucknell advanced the ball deep into Pitt territory to the 23-yard line and lost the ball on a fumble as the Pitt defense stiffened. Later Bucknell drove the ball to the Pitt 13-yard line and lost the ball on downs. In the second quarter, Henning came in at quarterback and had his 35 yard field goal try blocked, but he recovered for Bucknell. Bucknell fumbled on the next play and Pitt had possession on their 25-yard line. Bucknell garnered 8 first downs to Pitt's 6, but the halftime score read 0–0.

The second half belonged to Pitt. Pitt kicked off and Bucknell was forced to punt. Pitt gained possession on their 25-yard line. A pass from Karl Bohren to William Flanagan moved the ball to the 40-yard line. Two plays later a pass from Flanagan to Shuler advanced the ball 52 yards to the Bucknell 4-yard line. Andy Gustafson "brushed off right tackle for the first touchdown of the game." Milo Gwosden converted the goal after and Pitt led 7 to 0. Late in the third quarter Bucknell advanced the ball to the Pitt 27-yard line. The Panther defense held and gained possession on their 20-yard line. The Pitt offense moved the ball into Bucknell territory. The drive culminated with a pass from Karl Bohren to Nick Shuler for another Pitt touchdown. Flanagan kicked the goal and Pitt led 14 to 0. Coach Warner made numerous substitutions. Pitt kicked off and Bucknell tried to pass but John Harding intercepted and Pitt regained possession on the Bucknell 26-yard line. Pitt advanced the ball to the 6-yard line and on fourth down Gustafson bulled his way over the goal for the third Pitt score. Harding was good on the goal after and the final score read Pitt 21 to Bucknell 0.

The Pitt lineup for the game against Bucknell was Lloyd Jordan (left end), Ralph Chase (left tackle), Paul Templeton (left guard), William Ashbaugh (center), Harry Seidelson (right guard), Zoner Wissinger (right tackle), Carl Sauer (right end), Nick Shuler (quarterback), William Flanagan (left halfback), Karl Bohren (right halfback) and Nick Colonna (fullback). Substitutes appearing in the game for Pitt were Thomas Murdoch, Milo Gwosden, Andy Gustafson, Noble Frank, Marsh Johnson, William Haines, John Harding, James Brown and Ralph Evans. The game was played in 15-minute quarters.

=== Lafayette ===
Week 2: Lafayette at Pitt

Team	1	2	3	4	Total
Lafayette	0	0	0	0	0
• Pitt	7	0	0	0	7

- Date: October 6, 1923
- Location: Forbes Field
  Pittsburgh, PA
- Game start: 3:00 p.m.
- Game attendance: 18,000
- Referee: E. J. O'Brien (Tufts)

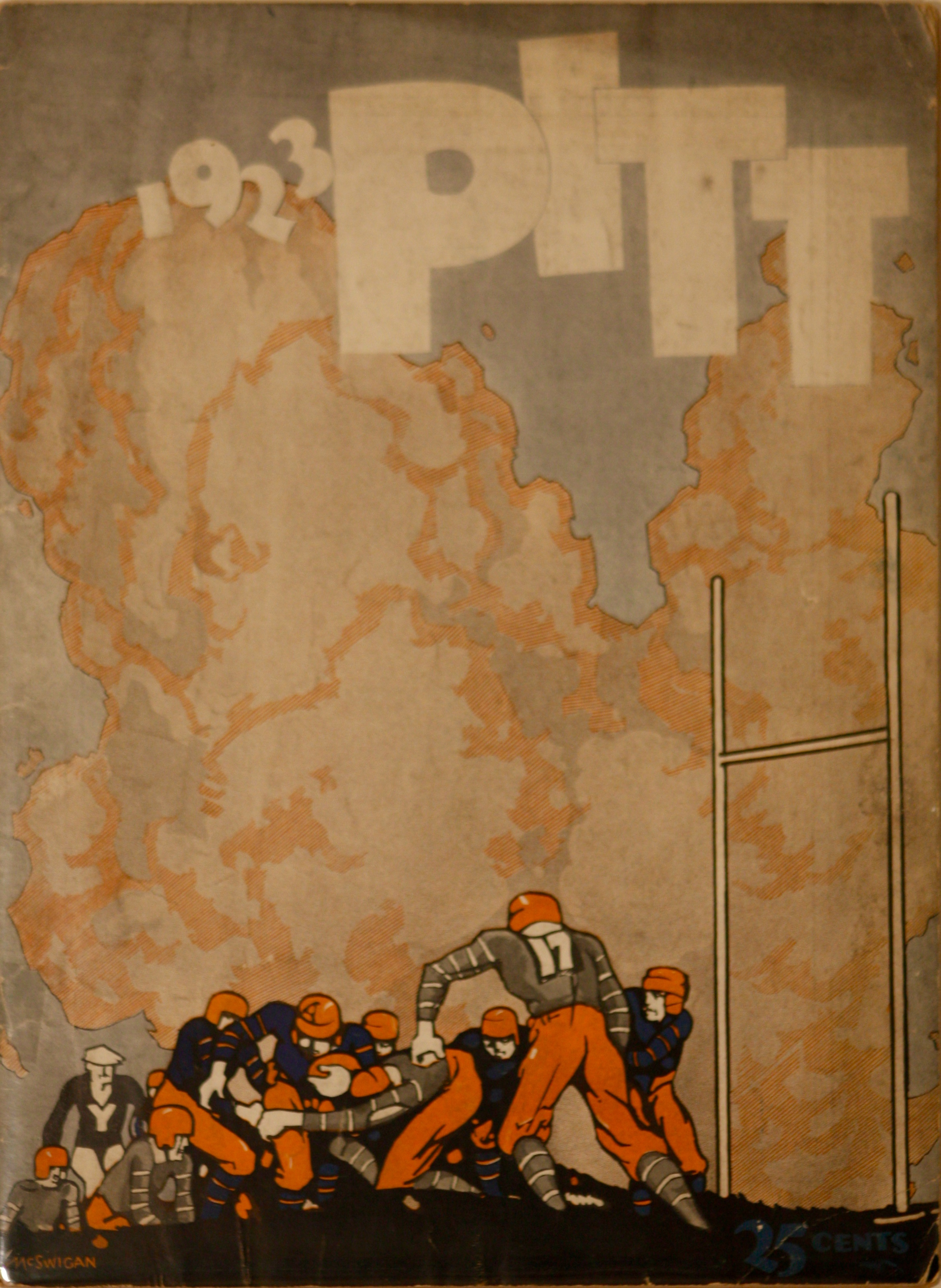
1923 University of Pittsburgh football yearbook and game day program

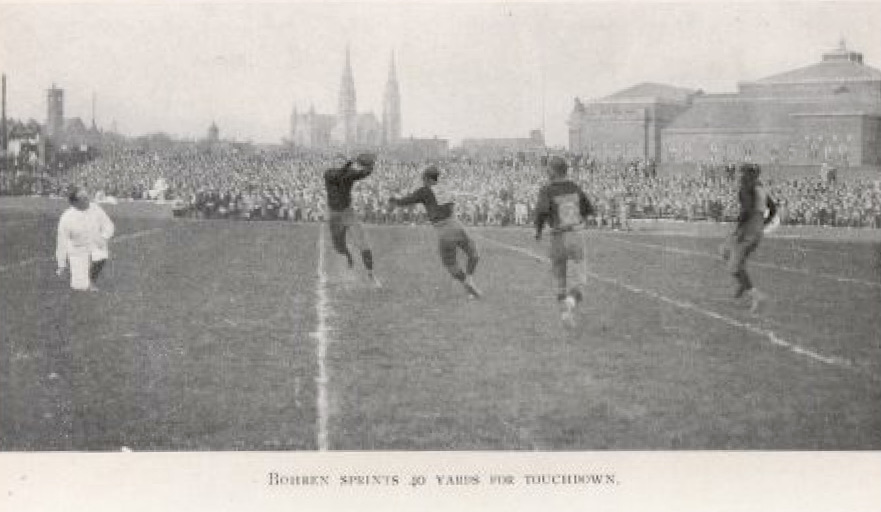
Photo from October 6, 1923 Pitt vs. Lafayette game

For the second year in a row the Panthers hosted the Lafayette Leopards for the home opener. Lafayette, led by soon to be Pitt coach "Jock" Sutherland, was on a two game win streak over the Panthers. The Leopards opened their season the previous week with a 20–0 win over Muhlenberg College. The Lafayette line boasted two All-America candidates – tackle Art Deibel and end Charlie Berry. "Sutherland expects to have every man in prime condition for the battle here, and it bids fair to prove one of the most interesting combats of the season in Pittsburgh." "'Jock' feels that he must instill confidence into the fans that will watch his handiwork next season, and he knows that the best way to do that is to make it three in a row."

Coach Warner wrote that the past two games against Lafayette were determined by fortunate breaks (Pitt fumbles) and this game may well go the same way. He felt that Lafayette was the more mature team and Pitt would be "mighty lucky" to win.

Pitt kicked off. Lafayette halfback Millman fumbled and Pitt's Nick Shuler scooped it up and was tackled on the 6-yard line. On third down Andy Gustafson fumbled on the one and Lafayette recovered. Pitt scored a touchdown later in the first period on a "sensational forward pass from (William) Flanagan to (Karl) Bohren, who ran 38 yards" for the score. Milo Gwosden converted the goal after and Pitt led 7–0. Early in the second quarter Pitt advanced the ball to the Leopards 2-yard line but a holding penalty negated the play and Pitt had to settle for a field goal try. Gwosden's attempt was short from 29 yards. The half ended with Pitt in control 7 to 0.

On the third play after the intermission Lafayette halfback Chicknoski intercepted Flanagan's pass and the Leopards had the ball on the Pitt 9-yard line. The Pitt defense held on downs and took possession on the 20-yard line. Gustafson fumbled and Leopard end O'Connell recovered on the Pitt 18-yard line. Their offense advanced the pigskin to the 2-yard line and again turned it over on downs. Pitt ball on the 20-yard line. Gustafson fumbled. The Pitt defense stiffened and Charlie Berry was wide on a 33-yard field goal attempt. The fourth quarter was a punting duel until Lafayette managed a late drive deep into Pitt territory. Lafayette gained possession on their 48-yard line. A 35 yard pass completion took the ball inside the Pitt 20-yard line. A fourth down pass completion moved the ball to the Pitt 6-yard line. On a first down running play - loss of 1 yard; On a second down running play-loss of 2 yards; On the third down pass play - gain of 1 yard; On fourth down a pass from quarterback Ernst to All-America end Berry "fell out of his hands" incomplete. Pitt escaped 7 to 0. Lafayette finished the season with a 6–1–2 record.

The Pitt lineup for the game against Lafayette was Lloyd Jordan (left end), Ralph Chase (left tackle), Paul Templeton (left guard), William Ashbaugh (center), Harry Seidelson (right guard), Zoner Wissinger (right tackle), Milo Gwosden (right end), Nick Shuler (quarterback), William Flanagan (left halfback), Karl Bohren (right halfback) and Andy Gustafson (fullback). Substitutes appearing in the game for Pitt were Thomas Murdoch, Marsh Johnson, Nick Colonna and Noble Frank. The game was played in 15-minute quarters.

=== West Virginia ===
Week 3: West Virginia at Pitt

Team	1	2	3	4	Total
• West Virginia	0	13	0	0	13
Pitt	0	0	7	0	7

- Date: October 13, 1923
- Location: Forbes Field
  Pittsburgh, PA
- Game start: 3:00 p.m.
- Game attendance: 30,000
- Referee: M. J. Thompson (Georgetown)

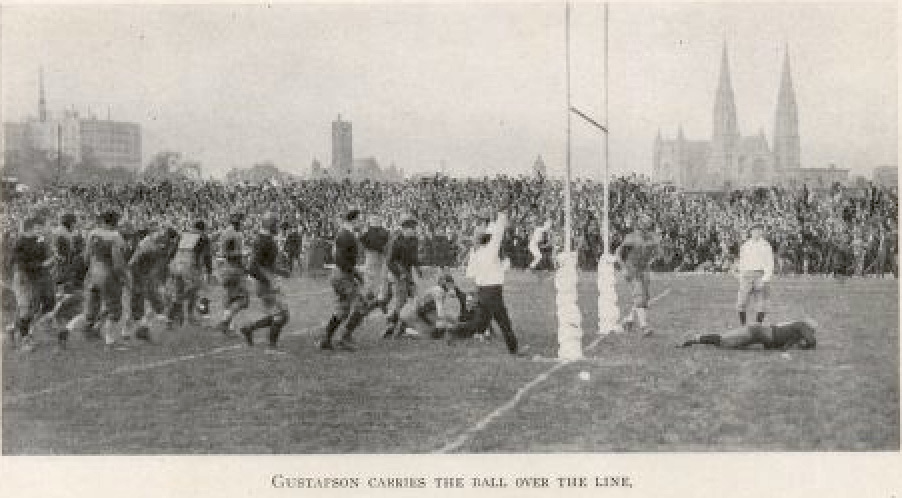
Photo from October 13, 1923 Pitt vs. West Virginia game

On October 13, undefeated Mountaineer second year coach Clarence Spears brought his squad to Pittsburgh for the nineteenth edition of the "Backyard Brawl". West Virginia sported a 12–0–1 record since Coach Spears arrived in Morgantown. The Mountaineer lineup contained three All-America honorees – ends Charles Tallman and Fred Graham, plus fullback Gus Eckberg. "The Mountaineers are primed for a battle royal. For the first time this season Coach Spears will have his full strength intact."

In Coach Warner's weekly Pittsburgh Press column he wrote: "West Virginia has the best prospects she has ever had and the best material in the section. Everything points to a West Virginia victory, and only good fortune and a super-human effort on the part of Pitt players can stave off a defeat." He also bemoaned the fumbling of the Panthers in the Lafayette game and was disappointed in the ineffectiveness of the Pitt running game.

Max E. Hannum of The Pittsburgh Press reported: "West Virginia University's football team ...was good enough to make it two in a row over Pitt, setting the Panther back upon its haunches at Forbes Field yesterday by a score of 13 to 7."

The first quarter ended scoreless with West Virginia in possession of the ball on the Pitt 8-yard line. They had third down with six to go. On fourth down Nick "Nardacci circled right end for a touchdown." Lloyd Jordan broke through the line and blocked Gus Eckberg's attempt at goal. WVU led 6 to 0. Later in the quarter, the Mountaineers gained possession on their 45-yard line and advanced the ball steadily downfield. Four first downs and they were on the Pitt 12-yard line. Eckberg and Nardacci ran the ball to the 2-yard line from where Eckberg threw a pass to Nardacci "skimming across the Panther goal line for a second touchdown." Eckberg was good on the point after and WVU led 14 to 0 at halftime.

In the third quarter, Nardacci fumbled a punt and Pitt recovered on the Mountaineers' 27-yard line. Three straight carries by Andy Gustafson accounted for the lone Pitt touchdown. The Pitt Weekly noted: "When Andy Gustafson plunged for twenty yards through that West Virginia team, carrying half of the West Virginia eleven with him, he could have been made the mayor of Pittsburgh." Milo Gwosden added the point after and the score read WVU 13 to Pitt 7. The Pitt offense was unable to generate another drive and their defense worked diligently to keep the Mountaineers out of the end zone in the fourth quarter. West Virginia finished the season with a 7–1–1 record.

The score indicates a close game, but the statistics prove otherwise. West Virginia accumulated 19 first downs to Pitt's 3. The Mountaineers gained 197 yards from scrimmage on the ground and 97 yards through the air. Pitt managed 39 yards from scrimmage on the ground and 22 yards through the air. "Probably the largest disparity in yardage a Warner-coached Pitt team has ever experienced."

The Pitt lineup for the game against West Virginia was Lloyd Jordan (left end), Thomas Murdoch (left tackle), Paul Templeton (left guard), William Ashbaugh (center), Hary Seidelson (right guard), Zoner Wissinger (right tackle), Milo Gwosden (right end), Nick Shuler (quarterback), William Flanagan (Left halfback), Karl Bohren (right halfback) and Nick Colonna (fullback). Substitutes appearing in the game for Pitt were Ralph Chase, Marsh Johnson, Andy Gustafson, James Brown, Frank Byers and Noble Frank. The game was played in 15-minute quarters.

=== At Syracuse ===
Week 4: Pitt at Syracuse

Team	1	2	3	4	Total
Pitt	0	0	0	0	0
• Syracuse	0	0	3	0	3

- Date: October 20, 1923
- Location: Yankee Stadium
  New York, NY
- Game start: 2:30 p.m.
- Game attendance: 22,000
- Referee: E. J. O'Brien (Tufts)

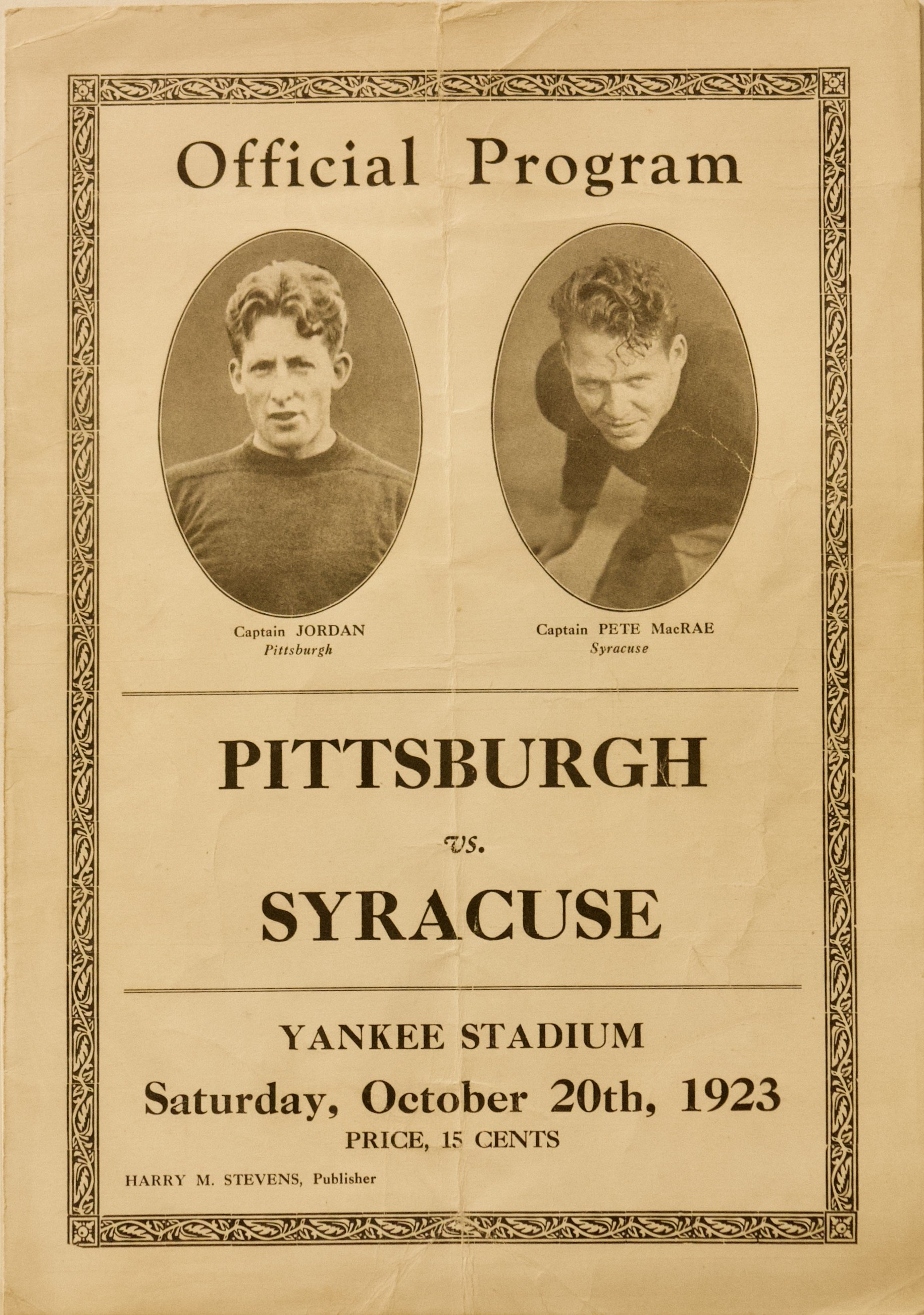
Program for October 20, 1923 Pitt vs. Syracuse game

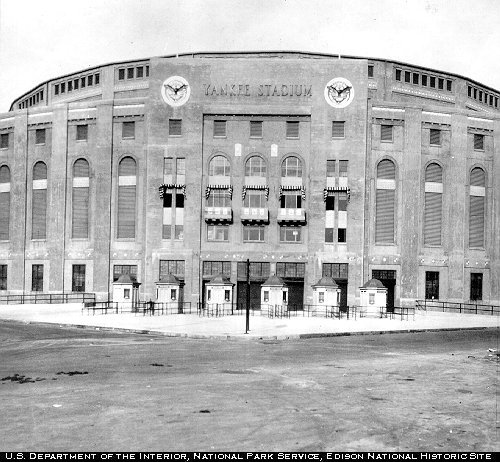
Yankee Stadium,1920s

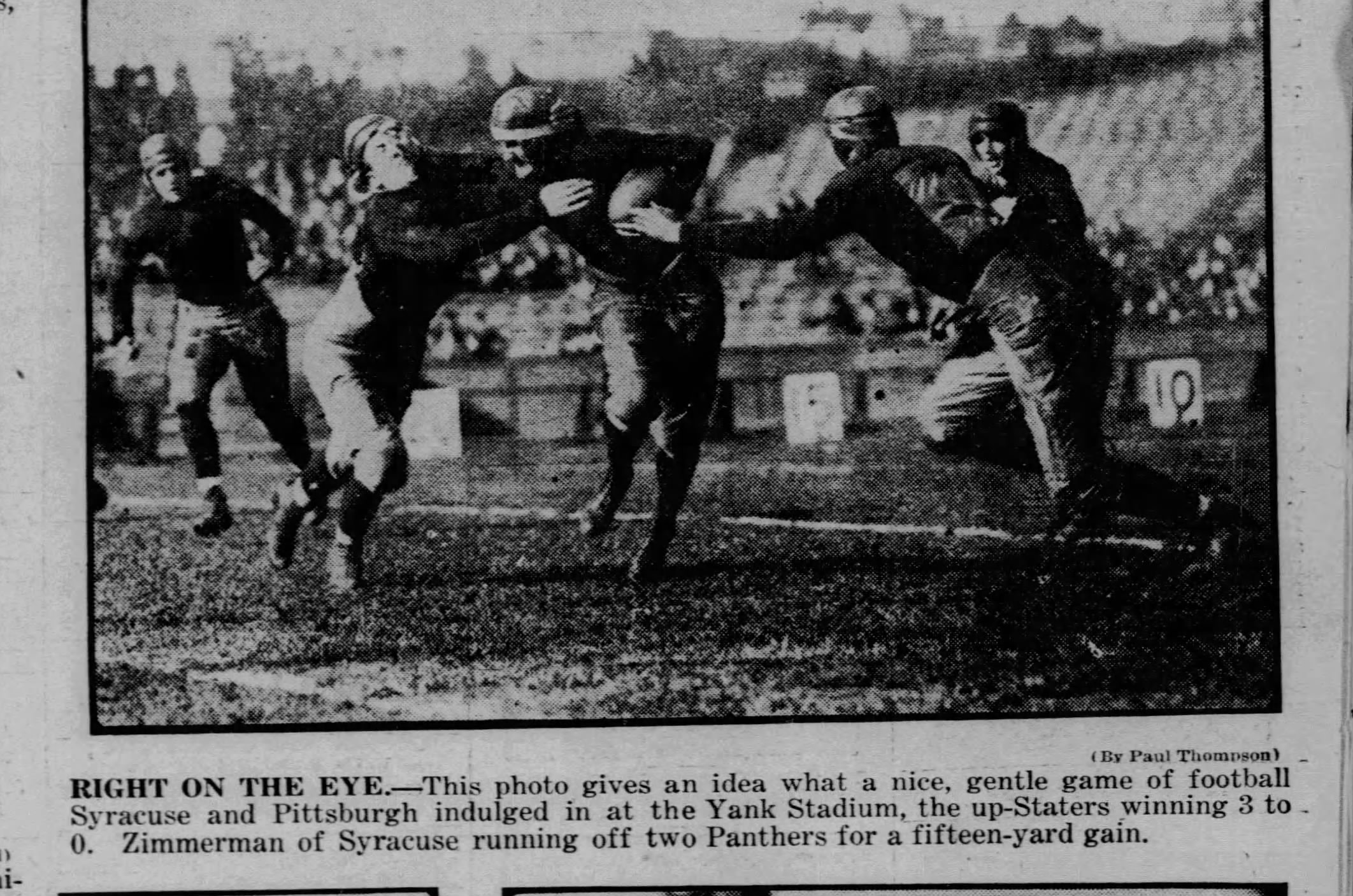
Giff Zimmerman of Syracuse running through two Pitt tacklers to gain fifteen yards

The next game on the schedule was a road trip to New York City to meet the Syracuse Orange led by fourth year coach Chick Meehan. The Orange were undefeated at 3–0 with a 23–0 win over Alabama the previous week. This historic seventh meeting in the series was the first college football game played in the new Yankee Stadium.

The Syracuse line was anchored by consensus All-America end Pete MacRae and future College Hall of Fame tackle Pappy Waldorf, who also received All-America mentions.

Coach Warner wrote that he was hopeful the Panthers would continue to improve but Syracuse was a veteran team. "The Panthers will likely suffer another defeat tomorrow. I will be greatly surprised if Pitt wins. The boys cannot get into proper condition for tomorrow's game after such hard games as they have passed through. Syracuse had an easy time of it thus far, and has pointed for this game." Their line averages 190 pounds per man and the entire backfield of last year returned. "I feel that it would be a miracle if Pitt should defeat such a team at this time."

"Chick Meehan's Syracuse team gained a measure of revenge on Pop Warner's Pittsburgh Panthers..winning by 3 to 0 in a bitterly waged ..game." "The game was won in the third period when John F. McBride, great plunging fullback, carefully took aim with his eye and then shot his trusty right foot against the oval and sent it spinning as straight as a bullet from a gun directly over the center of the Pittsburgh crossbars. The ball was held by quarterback Simmons and kicked from the 25-yard line."

In the opening minutes of the game Syracuse advanced the ball to the Pitt one yard line and surrendered the ball on downs. Pitt had two opportunities in the second period to score but the Syracuse pass defense held them out of the end zone. In the third period, McBride had his first field goal attempt blocked minutes earlier than his game winner. "Every Pittsburgh attempt was foiled in the final period, although Warner's charges tried desperately to get within scoring distance." Syracuse finished the season with an 8–1 record.

The Pitt lineup for the game against Syracuse was Lloyd Jordan (left end), Harold Akins (left tackle), Paul Templeton (left guard), Marsh Johnson (center), Harry Seidelson (right guard), Zoner Wissinger (right tackle), Milo Gwosden (right end), Nick Shuler (quarterback), William Flanagan (left halfback), Karl Boren (right halfback) and Andy Gustafson (fullback). Substitutes appearing in the game for Pittsburgh were Ralph Evans, Robert Irwin, Noble Frank, Thomas Murdoch, William Ashbaugh, Frank Byers, Nick Colonna and Ralph Chase. The game was played in 15-minute quarters.

=== Carnegie Tech ===
Week 5: Carnegie Tech at Pitt

Team	1	2	3	4	Total
• Carnegie Tech	0	0	7	0	7
Pitt	0	2	0	0	2

- Date: October 27, 1923
- Location: Forbes Field
  Pittsburgh, PA
- Game start: 2:30 p.m.
- Game attendance: 30,000
- Referee: James H. Moffatt (Princeton)

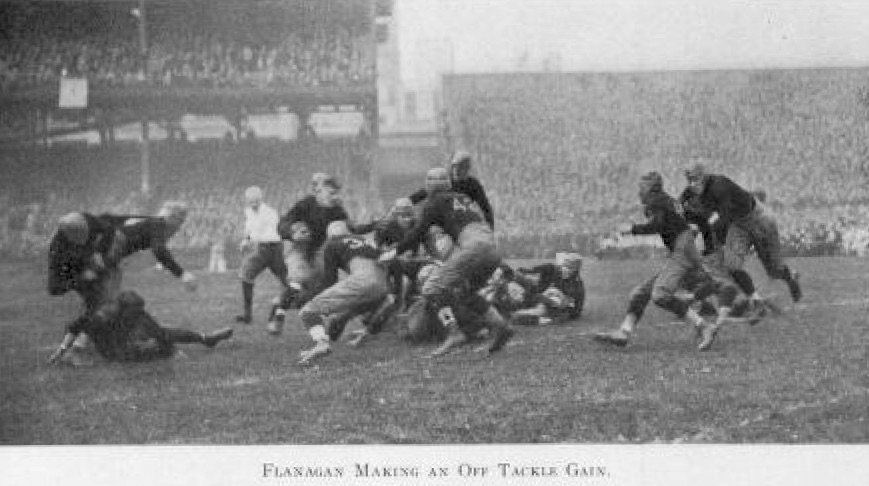
Photo from October 27, 1923 Pitt vs. Carnegie Tech game

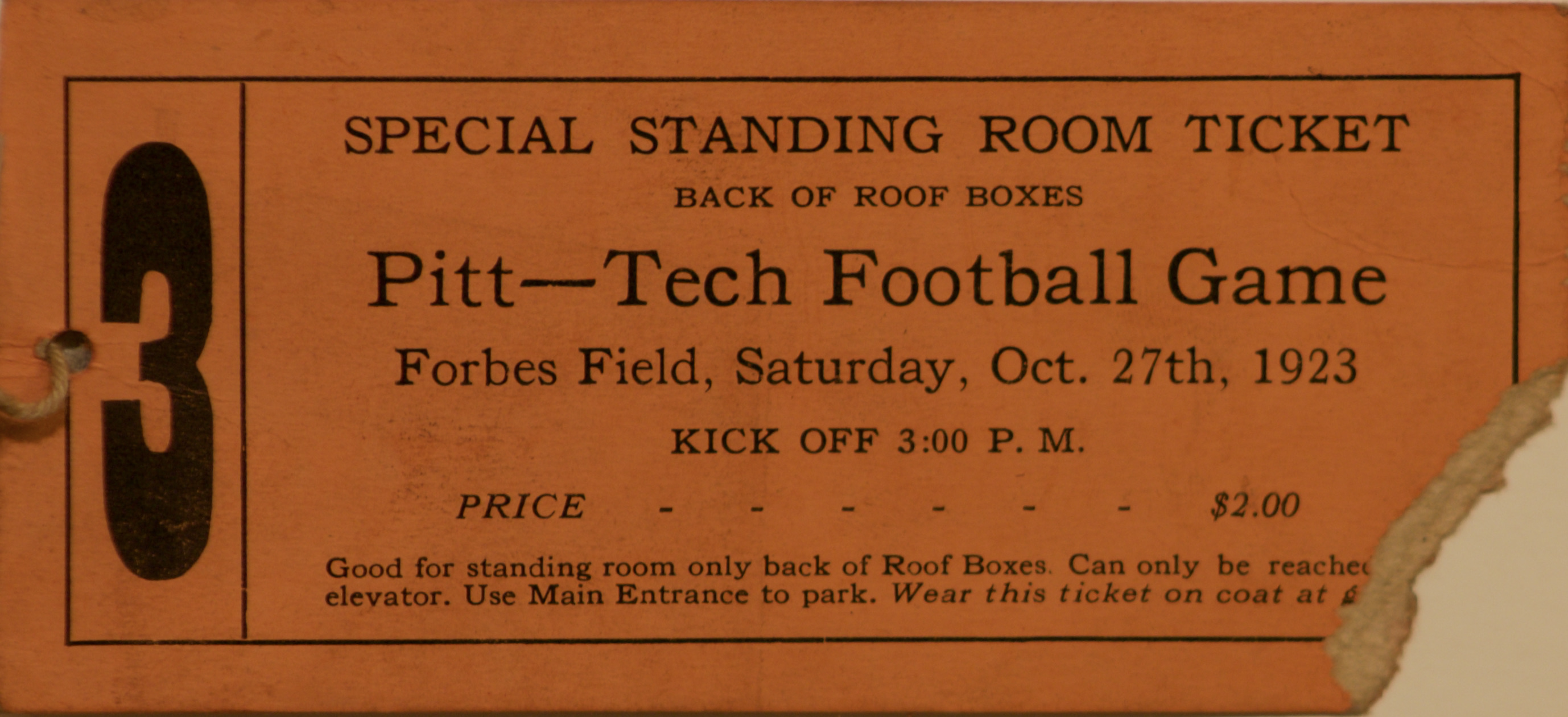
Ticket for October 27, 1923 Pitt vs. Carnegie Tech game

After a four year hiatus, the fifth game on the Pitt schedule was the resumption of "The City Championship" against Carnegie Tech. The Tartans were 3–1 on the season, narrowly losing to Washington & Jefferson 9–7 the previous week. Coach Walter Steffen was in his ninth year at the helm (1914-1923) and he owned a 40–24–2 record. Coach Steffen spoke with the Post-Gazette: "Warner's resourcefulness and his ability to use his reserve material to advantage, in which department he has Carnegie at a great disadvantage, should win for Pitt. Our best bet, Jimmy Robertson, and our best end, Meffort, are handicapped by injuries. Tech was badly used up against W. and J., while Pitt sustained very little injury against Syracuse. Everything considered, the best we expect is to hold Pitt to a low score, and the boys certainly will do their best toward that end."

Similarly, Coach Warner bemoaned injuries to his lineup in his weekly column and was not confident of victory. "Before Tech's fine showing against Wash – Jeff, I had thought Pitt would come through with a victory. It now looks to me as though Pitt will have to show better football than she has yet this season if another defeat is to be staved off. The teams appear to me to be very evenly matched, and I regard the outcome as a toss-up."

Max E. Hannum of The Pittsburgh Press reported: "Carnegie Tech's fondest dream came true yesterday at Forbes Field, when her gridiron warriors downed the blue and gold of Pitt for the first time in history. The score was 7 to 2, the Tartans coming from behind for their victory after a safety in the second quarter had given the Panthers two points."

After a scoreless first quarter, which saw Pitt stall on two drives deep into Tartan territory, the Panther linemen, Harold Akins and Lloyd Jordan, blocked a Tech punt by Anderson in the end zone. "Anderson caught the ball as it came down, but was dropped in his tracks and a safety was scored." The Tech offense then moved the ball to the Pitt 5-yard line and lost it on downs. Pitt led 2–0 at halftime.

Tartan back Jimmy Robertson returned the second half kick-off to his 33-yard line. On first down Tech completed a 52 yard pass play, Newman to Kristoff, ending on the Panther 15-yard line. Next play, Robertson "started around the Pitt left end; his path was blocked; several enemy tacklers brushed him, when suddenly he reversed his direction far behind the line of scrimmage and sprinted around the opposite terminal for the score, not a hostile player laid a hand on him." Comfort was good on the placement kick and Tech led 7 to 2. Pitt managed two more drives deep into Tech territory but came up short each time. The Panthers offense dominated the statistics: Pitt gained 352 total yards – Tech gained 167; Pitt earned 16 first downs – Tech managed 5. However, the Carnegie Tech defense recovered two Pitt fumbles and intercepted two Pitt passes. This was the first time the Warner's Panthers lost three games in a row. Carnegie Tech finished the season with a 4–3–1 record.

The Pitt lineup for the game against Carnegie Tech was Lloyd Jordan (left end), Harold Akins (left tackle), Paul Templeton (left guard), Marsh Johnson (center), Noble Frank (right guard), Zoner Wissinger (right tackle), Milo Gwosden (right end), Nick Shuler (quarterback), William Flanagan (left halfback), Karl Boren (right halfback) and Andy Gustafson (fullback). Substitutes appearing in the game for Pitt were Frank Byers, James Brown, Carl Sauer and Harry Seidelson. The game was played in 15-minute quarters.

=== At Penn ===
Week 6: Pitt at Penn

Team	1	2	3	4	Total
Pitt	0	0	0	0	0
• Penn	0	6	0	0	6

- Date: November 3, 1923
- Location: Franklin Field
  Philadelphia, PA
- Game start: 2:30 p.m.
- Game attendance: 46,000
- Game weather: Ideal
- Referee: Edward Thorpe (De LaSalle)

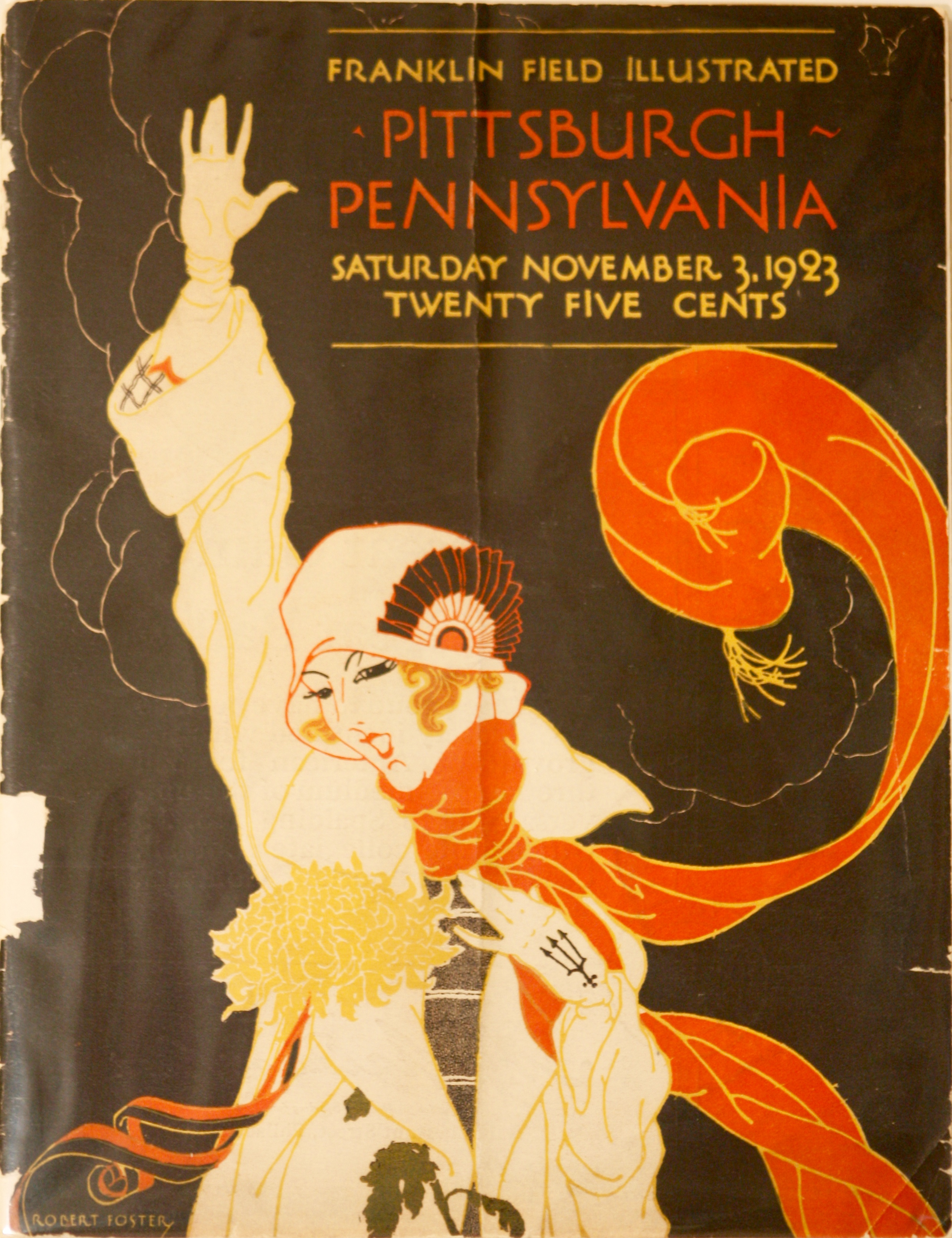
Program for November 3, 1923 Pennsylvania vs. Pitt game

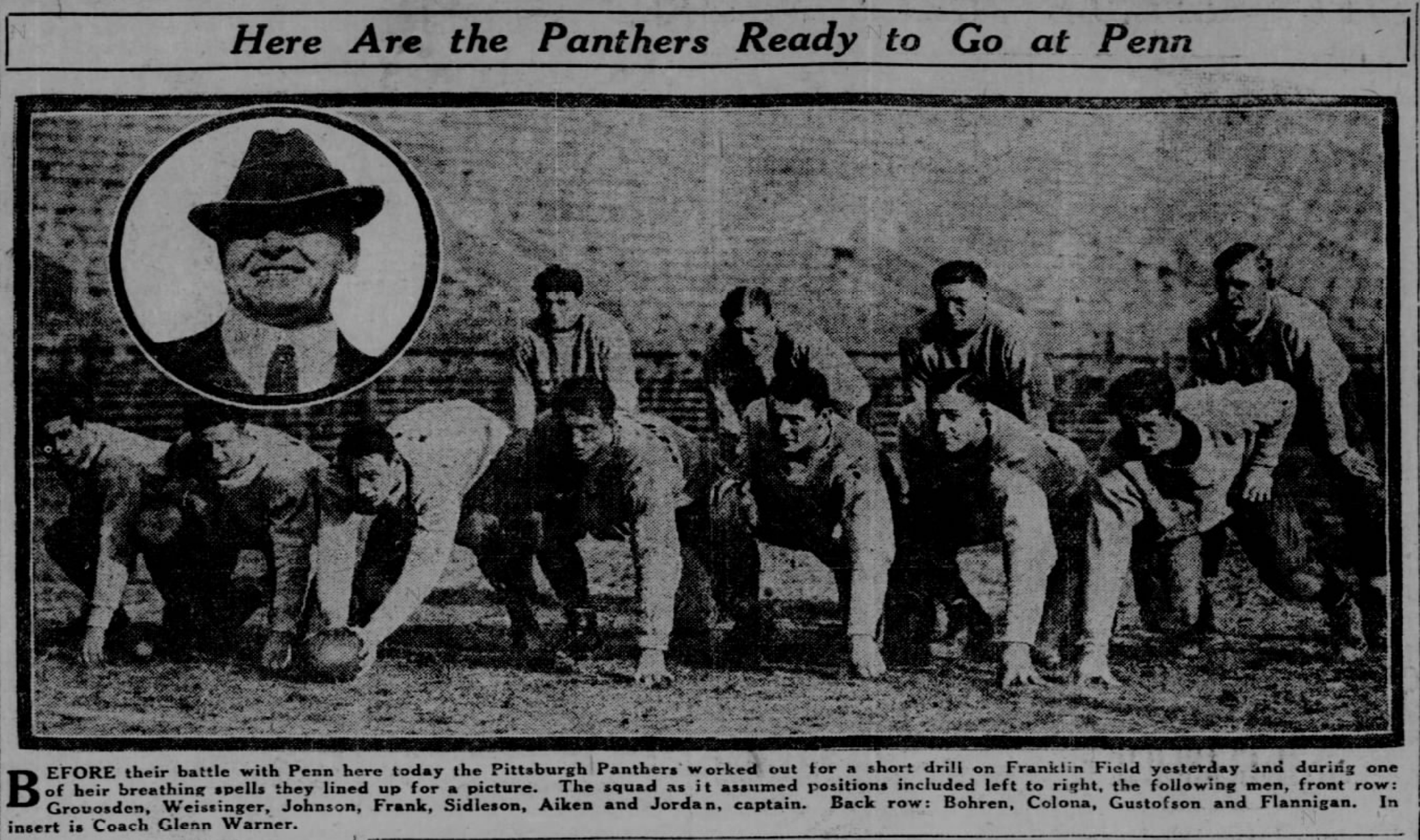
Pitt lineup for November 3, 1923 game vs. Pennsylvania

The Panthers annual sojourn to Philadelphia to meet the Penn Quakers took place the weekend of November 3. The Quakers were led by first year coach Lou Young. Coach Young played for Penn from 1912 to 1914 and captained the 1913 team that went 6–3–1. His present eleven were 4–1, having defeated a strong Centre College team the previous week. Penn had never beaten the Panthers and Gordon Mackay of The Inquirer wrote: "Pitt, on the strength of the Blue and Gold's performances on the past three Saturdays, does not loom as formidable as of yore. However, the Panther always manages to eke around Penn, somehow or other. But if the Quakers lose today then the undergraduates and alumni have a right never to expect another victory over Pitt – as the gods of war and fortune have built everything that should conduce to a triumph for the gladiators across the Schuykill."

Coach Warner agreed that "if Penn didn't win today, her chances of scalping the Panther would be lessened in the coming years." He also was concerned that his starting guard Paul Templeton would miss the game and Nick Colonna would be making his first start at quarterback.

Gordon Mackay of The Philadelphia Inquirer penned: "From the barren past of eight sterile, fruitless years of battle against the Panther, Penn swept to victory yesterday at Franklin Field, 6 to 0, in one of the most thrilling struggles waged by football warriors of the Red and Blue in recent years."

At the end of the scoreless first quarter, William Flanagan fumbled and Penn back Enid Thomas recovered on Pitt's 35-yard line. The Penn backfield of McGraw, Hamer and Thomas steadily advanced the ball to the Pitt 4-yard line. Rae McGraw then went over for the game's only score. Milo Gwosden blocked Hamer's extra point attempt. Penn led 6 to 0. The ball see-sawed back and forth between the two elevens in the second half and the Penn defense was able to hold off the desperate Pitt aerial attack to secure the victory.

Pitt garnered 11 first downs to 9 for Penn and out gained the Quakers 326 yards to 265. But the Panthers fumbled 5 times and Penn recovered 3 of them. Pitt was also guilty of 7 penalties for a total of 65 yards.

Regis M. Welsh of the Pittsburgh Daily Post summed it up best: "The Panthers owe their defeat to no one but themselves. Their atrocious fumbling of punts, their misplays in the line and their repeated faults, taking away from them the fruits of hard earned marches at several stages of the game."

The Pitt lineup for the game against Penn was Lloyd Jordan (left end), Harold Akins (left tackle), Noble Frank (left guard), Marsh Johnson (center), Harry Seidelson (right guard), Zoner Wissinger (right tackle), Milo Gwosden (right end) Nick Colonna (quarterback), William Flanagan (left halfback), Karl Bohren (right halfback) and Andy Gustafson (fullback). Substitutes appearing in the game for Pitt were Ralph Chase, Carl Sauer, Nick Shuler, James Brown and Frank Byers. The game was played in 15-minute quarters.

=== Grove City ===
Week 7: Grove City at Pitt

Team	1	2	3	4	Total
Grove City	0	0	7	0	7
• Pitt	0	7	6	0	13

- Date: November 10, 1923
- Location: Forbes Field
  Pittsburgh, PA
- Game attendance: 10,000
- Referee: A. H. Sharpe (Yale)

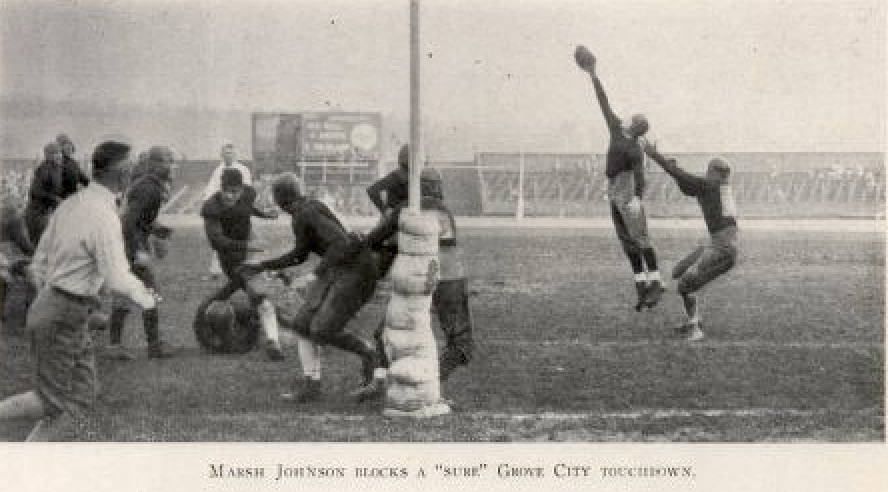
Photo from November 10, 1923 Pitt vs. Grove City game

Graduate Manager Karl E. Davis scheduled Grove City College between the Penn and Washington & Jefferson games to give the Panthers a so-called breather game. Additionally, Grove City was coached by Guy Williamson and assisted by Charles Bowser, both former Pitt stars. Pitt had not played Grove City since 1906 and held a 5–2–1 edge in the series. Coach Williamson's Crimson won the class B Collegiate Championship of Western Pennsylvania the previous season and presently had a 3–2 record. According to The Pittsburgh Press: "It looks now that Pitt has bitten off more than she expected to, and that the game will be between two teams that are more evenly matched than it was thought they would be, when the game was arranged."

Coach Warner admitted: "While it is rather late in the season to make changes in the lineup, it has been deemed wise to give some of the promising reserves a tryout before the big games with W. & J. and State to make sure no good men are being overlooked, and at the same time give some of the regulars a much-needed rest." The Panther backfield was composed of substitutes since Jake Bohren and William Flanagan were nursing injuries and Nick Colonna was attending his mother's funeral.

Regis M. Welsh of The Pittsburgh Sunday Post reported: "The thrill which comes once in a lifetime to towns off the main line was felt throughout Mercer county for a short minute yesterday afternoon when Grove City, Class B, but fighting like an A Class or better aggregation, tied the score with the Pitt Panther and made it look as though the day of reckoning for 'Pop' Warner had not yet passed. But then, unaccustomed to concrete stands, bands dolled up in full regalia and other things which go with big league stuff, Keck, the Crimson back, forgetting the rudiments of the game during the excitement, tried to catch a punt on his own three-yard line, instead of letting it roll over the line. And like all fellows who forget, Keck made his play complete by forgetting to hold the ball, and as (Pitt guard) 'Hap' Frank dashed down the field and slid onto the bounding oval, Pitt, beaten four times in succession, finally achieved a victory, 13–7, and heard the crowd give them a cheer."

The first quarter was scoreless. Late in the second period Pitt gained possession on their 27-yard line. James Brown completed a short pass to John Harding and he "took the ball on the dead run and started off down the field on an ankle excursion that only ended when he stepped over the goal line." Brown converted the goal after and Pitt led at halftime 7 to 0. Early in the third quarter Grove City end, Clees, "jumped into the hero role by spearing a toss from Harding and carrying it to the (Pitt) 15 before a mass of blue jerseys cut him to earth." Five plays later "Hartman squirmed and wiggled his way over the goal." Hill converted the placement and the score was tied. Grove City kicked off and forced a punt. Their jubilation was short-lived as Keck fumbled the punt into the end zone and Frank recovered for Pitt's go-ahead touchdown. The Crimson line burst through and smothered Milo Gwosden's placement kick. Final score: Pitt 13 to Grove City 7.

The Pitt lineup for the game against Grove City was Lloyd Jordan (left end), Harold Akins (left tackle), Ralph Chase (left guard), Marsh Johnson (center), Thomas Murdoch (right guard), Zoner Wissinger (right tackle), Milo Gwosdaen (right end), Frank Williams (quarterback), John Harding (left halfback), James Brown (right halfback) and Nick Shuler (fullback). Substitutes appearing in the game for Pitt were Carl Sauer, Nick Colonna, William Haines, Paul Templeton, Frank Byers, Noble Frank and Robert Irwin. The game was played in 15-minute quarters.

=== Washington & Jefferson ===
Week 8: Washington & Jefferson at Pitt

Team	1	2	3	4	Total
W. & J.	0	6	0	0	6
• Pitt	0	3	7	3	13

- Date: November 17, 1923
- Location: Forbes Field
  Pittsburgh, PA
- Game start: 2:30 p.m.
- Game attendance: 31,000
- Game weather: drizzle
- Referee: A. H. Sharpe (Yale)

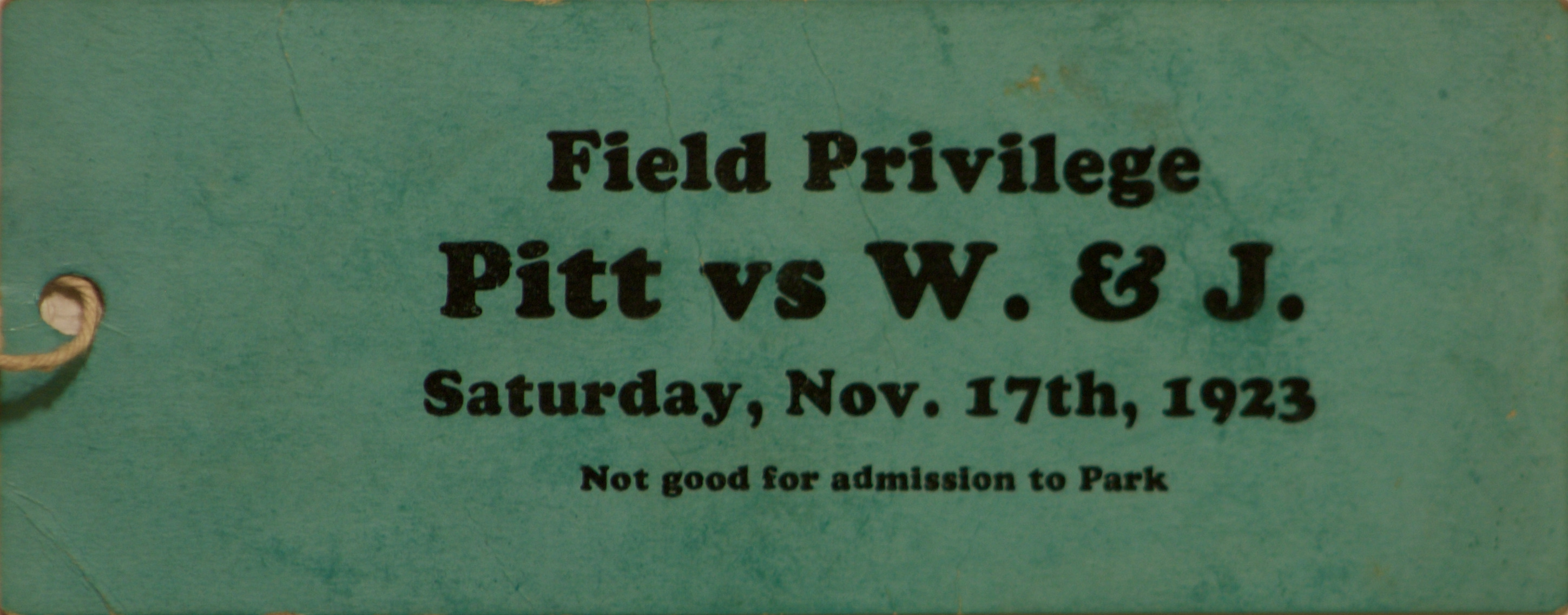
Field pass for November 17, 1923 Pitt vs. W. & J. game

In 1923 in Pittsburgh, "there is no game that commands more attention than that between the Panthers and the Presidents...the old rivalry is always there, and the meetings between them stir up enthusiasm that is not matched by any other contest on the western Pennsylvania program." Adding to the drama, was that John Heisman was the new coach of the Presidents. Since the 1895 confrontation between Georgia, coached by Warner, and Auburn, led by Heisman, which was won by Auburn, Heisman has been unable to duplicate the feat with his Georgia Tech or University of Pennsylvania elevens against the Panthers. Coach Warner hoped to keep the streak intact. Washington & Jefferson was 5–0–1 on the season with a tie against the "Jock" Sutherland Lafayette eleven their only blemish. The President's line was anchored by All-America tackle Chet Widerquist. "Heisman admitted that his team was in splendid condition."

To bolster the line play for the game with W. & J., coach Warner enlisted the aid of Grove City assistant coach Charles Bowser. The Haskell Indian team had a stopover in Pittsburgh on Tuesday on their way to New York City and engaged in a beneficial forty minute scrimmage with the Panthers. "The men will enter the game on Saturday in better physical condition than they have known for some time, and, regardless of the outcome, it is certain that W. & J. will know she has been through a hard game when it is all over."

Chester L. Smith of The Gazette Times reported: "The long, bitter trail, leading down into the valley of defeat, which the Panther has followed through the autumn, took a turn upward in an hour of tense football at Forbes Field yesterday, when a Pitt team – the reincarnation of Pitt teams of yore – swept Washington & Jefferson down into the depths of a heart-breaking 13-to-6 whipping."

The scoreless first period ended with Pitt in possession on their own 33-yard line. On the second play after the break, "(Andy) Gustafson hit the left side of the W. & J. line, got loose and with superb interference, ran 55 yards to the W. & J. 5-yard line." The Presidents held on downs and took over possession on their 4-yard line. W. & J. punted and the Pitt offense ended up on the Presidents 12-yard line. The W. & J. defense held and Pitt end Milo Gwosden kicked an 18 yard field goal and Pitt led 3 to 0. After an exchange of possessions Pitt was forced to punt and W. & J. back Niehaus blocked the kick and scooped it up and raced 40 yards for the touchdown. The point after attempt was blocked by Lloyd Jordan. Halftime score: W. & J. 6 to Pitt 3.

The second half was all Pitt. On Pitt's second possession from their 21-yard line the offense started a sustained drive and advanced the ball to the W. & J. 7-yard line. The Presidents defense stiffened but on fourth down "Bohren climaxed the wonderful drive by dashing off the W. & J. right tackle for a touchdown. Gwosden kicked a placement goal for the extra point." Pitt 10 to W. & J. 6. The fourth quarter was played in W. & J. territory with Pitt finally recovering a fumble on the W. & J. 19-yard line and converting a Frank Byers placement field goal from the 24-yard line for the final points of the game. Pitt 13 to W. & J. 6.

The game statistics magnify the superiority of the Panther eleven in this game. The underdog Panthers out gained the favored Presidents 294 yards to 75 and Pitt earned 14 first downs to 4 for Wash.-Jeff. This victory caused great excitement and lead to fans storming the field.

The Pitt lineup for the game against Washington & Jefferson was Lloyd Jordan (left end), Ralph Chase (left tackle), Paul Templeton (left guard), Marsh Johnson (center), Harry Seidelson (right guard), Zoner Wissinger (right tackle), Milo Gwosden (right end), Nick Shuler (quarterback), William Flanagan (left halfback), Karl Boren (right halfback) and Andy Gustafson (fullback). Substitutes appearing in the game for Pitt were Thomas Murdoch, Frank Byers, James Brown, Nick Colonna, Carl Sauer and Noble Frank. The game was played in 15-minute quarters.

=== Penn State ===
Week 9: Penn State at Pitt

Team	1	2	3	4	Total
Penn State	3	0	0	0	3
• Pitt	0	14	6	0	20

- Date: November 29, 1923
- Location: Forbes Field
  Pittsburgh, PA
- Game start: 2:00 p.m.
- Game weather: rain
- Referee: W. G. Crowell (Swarthmore)

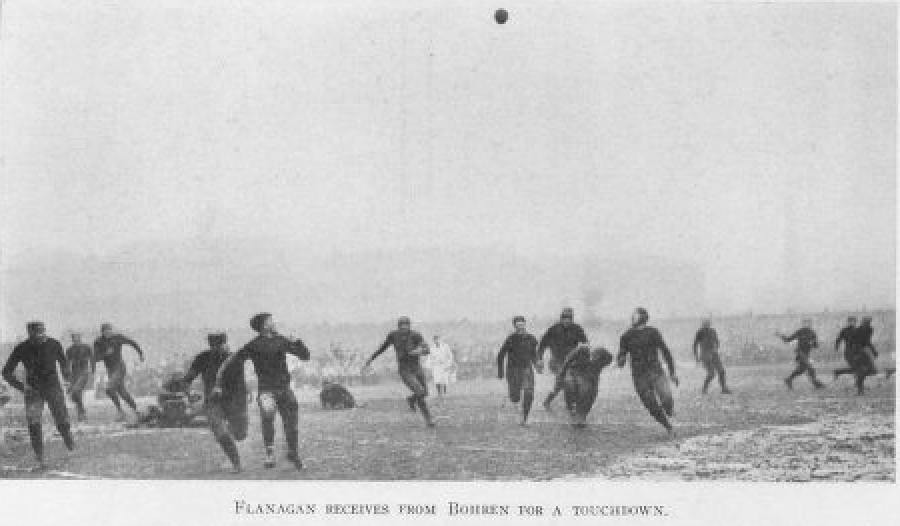
Photo from November 29, 1923 Pitt vs. Penn State game

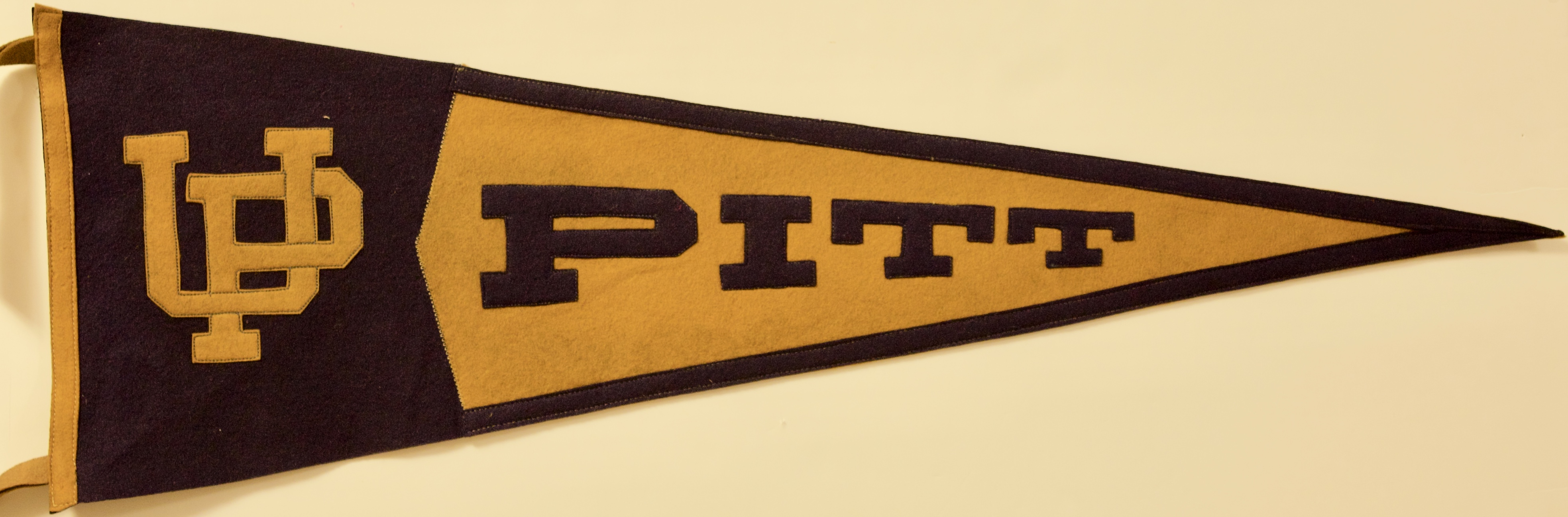
Souvenir Pitt pennant circa 1920s

With Pitt owning a 4-4 record and the Lions of Mt. Nittany coming to the Thanksgiving Day tussle with a 6–1–1 slate, the likelihood of sending Coach Warner off to Stanford with a final game victory looked slim. The Nittanies had tied West Virginia, lost to Syracuse, and beat Penn handily (20–0) in their last game. Sixth year coach Hugo Bezdek's team had consensus All-America halfback and future College Football Hall of Fame member "Lighthorse" Harry Wilson starring in the backfield, and All-America guard Joe Bedenk anchoring the line. Warner warned: "Against Pitt the indications are that Bezdek will have his strongest combination all in good condition for the first time this year."

The Pittsburgh Press noted: "It goes without saying that Pitt's veteran coach would literally give several years of his life to wind up his career at Pitt with a victory over Penn State... He and Bezdek may never coach teams again that will meet each other. And 'Pop' would like to take away with him a memory of a final triumph over Hugo's lads."

"Prior to kickoff, the Panther mascot presented Warner with a diamond scarf pin, a token of affection from the student body. In the stands, fans held up large gold-and-blue placards that spelled out 'Pop'."

Ralph S. Davis reported: "The Nittany Lion was driven out of the jungle yesterday by a lean and hungry Panther. One of the biggest gridiron surprises of the season was sprung at Forbes Field, when Pop Warner's Pittites wiped up a muddy field with the highly touted Bezdekians from Penn State College. The score of the game – 20 to 3 – hardly tells the story of Pitt's superiority over a foe that was expected to make mincemeat of the Panther."

Penn State scored first. The Panthers botched a punt and Penn State gained possession on the Pitt 22-yard line. The Pitt defense held and State tackle Dick Schuster kicked a 29 yard field goal. Early in the second stanza Pitt's offense sustained a 60 yard drive with Karl Bohren and William Flanagan alternating receiving and throwing passes. Bohren capped the drive with a 23 yard pass to Flanagan for the first Pitt touchdown. Milo Gwosden converted the point after and Pitt led 7 to 3. After the kick-off State was forced to punt and Gustafson fumbled giving State the ball on the Pitt 26-yard line. On second down Bohren intercepted and out-raced Harry Wilson 70 yards for the second Pitt touchdown of the quarter. Gwosden was successful on the point after and Pitt led at halftime, 14 to 3. The final tally came in the third period. Gwosden's attempted field goal rolled to the 2-yard line. State tried to advance the ball but the Panther defense forced a punt. "(Ralph) Chase crashed his way through, launched his body in the path of the pigskin and sent it rolling. Milo Gwosden was the first to reach it and as Milo hugged the ball to him what remained of the Lion's hope for reprisal flickered out."

The Pitt lineup for the game against Penn State was Lloyd Jordan (left end), Ralph Chase (left tackle), Paul Templeton (left guard), Marsh Johnson (center), Harry Seidelson (right guard), Zoner Wissinger (right tackle), Milo Gwosden (right end), Nick Shuler (quarterback), William Flanagan (left halfback), Karl Bohren (right halfback) and Andy Gustafson (fullback). Substitutes appearing in the game for Pitt were Harold Akins, James Brown, Nick Colonna, Noble Frank, Frank Byers, Carl Sauer and William Ashbaugh.

Coach Warner wrote in The Gazette Times: "It was a great victory, that of Pitt over Penn State yesterday, and I was delighted more than words can tell at the way the boys played. They knew I wanted to win this windup game of my coaching career at Pitt more than any other they ever played and while primarily they were playing for the Blue and Gold of Pitt, I think they showed me that they were fighting for the 'old man' as well as for their alma mater, and I appreciate their final effort. The Pitt squad is composed of a grand bunch of boys and I was very proud of their loyalty and friendship."

== Scoring summary ==
1923 Pittsburgh Panthers scoring summary
Player	Touchdowns	Extra points	Field goals	Safety	Points
Karl Bohren	3	0	0	0	18
Andy Gustafson	3	0	0	0	18
Milo Gwosden	1	6	1	0	15
William Flanagan	1	1	0	0	7
John Harding	1	1	0	0	7
Noble Frank	1	0	0	0	6
Nick Shuler	1	0	0	0	6
Franklin Byers	0	0	1	0	3
Jesse Brown	0	1	0	0	1
team	0	0	0	1	2
Totals	11	9	2	1	83

== Postseason ==
Ralph Davis of the Pittsburgh Press penned an apt farewell to Coach Warner: "As Glenn S. Warner steps out of the University of Pittsburgh football picture, it is only fitting that his passing should be noted. It is with genuine regret that thousands of football lovers in this city mark his going. He placed Pitt in the front football rank. In the nine years that he was head coach here, he has never turned out a poor team. He has had his off-seasons, of course, but he has always finished a season with a better team than he had at the beginning. He is a real gridiron wizard - one of the few men who give their entire thought to football. Pitt will miss hin beyond question, for his equal is hard to find. And as he goes to Stanford next fall, he will take with him the best wishes of all who have thoroughly enjoyed football as played by the teams he has coached."

The following 19 players and Manager received their "P" from the Athletic Council – Captain Lloyd Jordan, Ralph Chase, Paul Templeton, Marsh Johnson, William Ashbaugh, William Flanagan, Harold Akins, Franklin Byers, Tom Murdoch, Nick Shuler, Milo Gwosdan, Zoner Wissinger, Harry Seidelson, Noble Lee Frank, Andrew Gustafson, Karl Boren, James Brown, Nick Colonna, Carl Sauer and Manager R. French Boulton.

Noble Lee Frank was voted Captain for the 1924 season by the 19 lettermen.

Harry M. Reed was appointed student manager of the football team for the 1924 season.

John Bain Sutherland was feted on December 20 in Easton, Pennsylvania, and presented with a gold watch for his service as Lafayette coach. His 5-year coaching record with the Leopards was 33–8–2. After dinner "Jock" headed back to Pittsburgh as both a dental faculty member and the new head football coach of the University of Pittsburgh.

=== All-American selections ===
Karl Bohren – halfback (third team Walter Camp)
