= Van Hornesville Falls =

- Location within New York
- Location: Van Hornesville, New York
- Coordinates: 42.898°N 74.82123°W
- Watercourse: Otsquago Creek

Van Hornesville Falls is a waterfall located on Otsquago Creek north of Van Hornesvile, New York.
