= Norman Daniels (disambiguation) =

Norman Daniels (born 1942) is an American philosopher, ethicist, bioethicist, and healthcare policy author at Harvard University.

Norman Daniels or Norm Daniels may also refer to:

- Norm Daniels (American football) (1907–2009), American athlete and coach
- Norman A. Daniels (1905–1995), American pulp fiction and television writer
- Norm Daniels (fl. 20th–21st century), former CEO of the G.I. Joe's retail chain
- Norman Daniels, antagonist of the novel Rose Madder
