= Otsquene Creek =

- Location of the mouth of Otsquene Creek Otsquene Creek (the United States)

Location
- Country: United States
- State: New York
- Region: Central New York Region
- Counties: Herkimer, Montgomery

Physical characteristics
- Source
  - coordinates: 42°57′52″N 74°46′15″W
- Mouth: Otsquago Creek
  - location: Valley Brook, New York, United States
  - coordinates: 42°55′53″N 74°40′20″W
  - elevation: 423 ft (129 m)

Otsquene Creek is a river in Herkimer County and Montgomery County in the U.S. State of New York. It enters Otsquago Creek by Valley Brook, New York. On the 1905 Fulton and Montgomery County Atlas it is referred to as Crab-skill Creek.
