= Otsquago Creek =

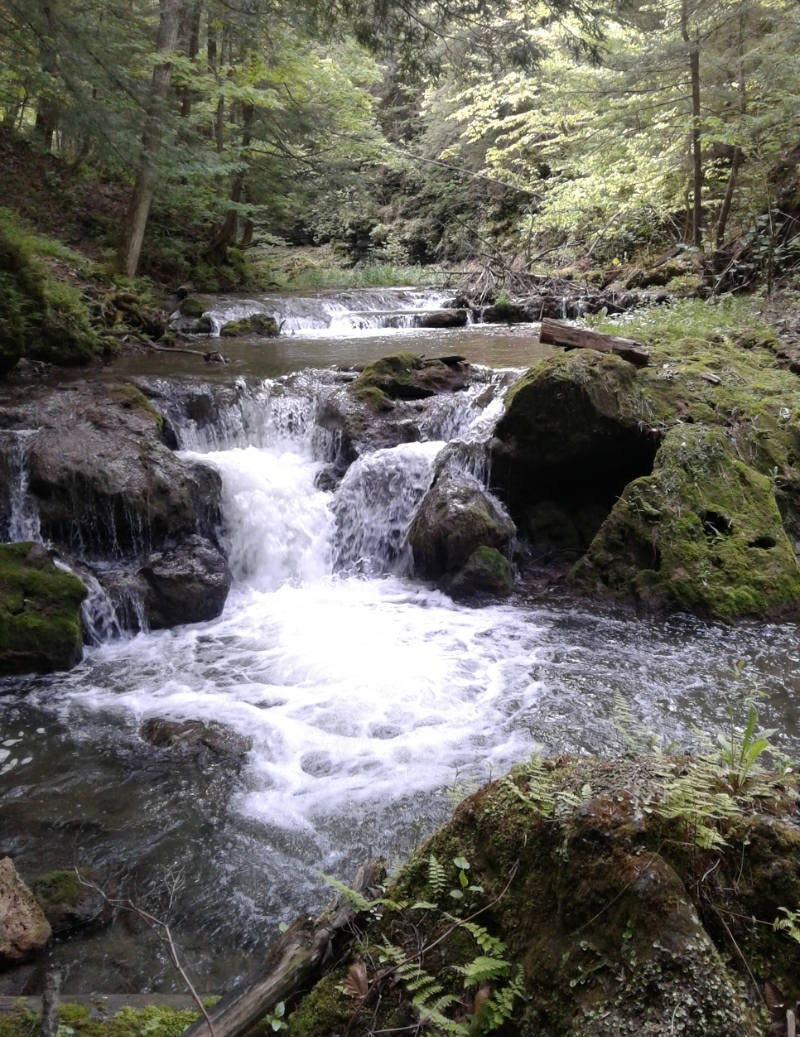
- Rapids on the creek by Vanhornesville

- Location of the mouth of Otsquago Creek Otsquago Creek (the United States)

Location
- Country: United States
- State: New York
- Region: Central New York Region
- Counties: Herkimer, Montgomery
- Towns: Stark, Minden

Physical characteristics
- Source: Un-named Marshy Field
  - location: Van Hornesville, New York
  - coordinates: 42°54′27″N 74°50′25″W
  - elevation: 1,360 ft (410 m)
- Mouth: Mohawk River
  - location: Fort Plain, New York
  - coordinates: 42°55′57″N 74°37′04″W
  - elevation: 295 ft (90 m)
- Length: 18.6 mi (29.9 km)
- Basin size: 61.3 sq mi (159 km^{2})
- Discharge
  - location: Fort Plain
  - minimum: .6 cu ft/s (0.017 m^{3}/s)
  - maximum: 24,600 cu ft/s (700 m^{3}/s)

Basin features
- Tributaries
  - left: Loyal Creek, Otsquene Creek
  - right: Otstungo Creek
- Waterfalls: Creamery Falls, Van Hornesville Falls

Otsquago Creek is a river that enters the Mohawk River in Fort Plain, New York. Otsquago is a Mohawk language word meaning 'under the bridge', probably referring to an early bridge of felled trees along the creek, a way of making small bridges. It is also referred to as Otsquage on old maps, which is a Mohawk word for 'healing waters'.

The source of the Otsquago Creek is about 12 miles southeast from its outlet, 1,360 feet above sea level and about 1,000 feet above the Mohawk River, in a marshy field by Van Hornesville, New York. Creamery Falls and Van Hornesville Falls are two waterfalls on the creek near Van Hornesville.

== History ==
Before European colonization, the Iroquois Indians occupied the area around the creek. Many Indian villages were built along the creek. One of these villages was called Otstungo and is located on a triangular piece of land between the Otstungo Creek and Otsquago Creek, by the mouth of Otstungo Creek. The village was only accessed from the south side due to steep cliffs on the other sides. Many stone axes, pestles, arrowheads, spears, bone implements and pipes have been excavated at this village. A large pine was cut from this location that measured nearly 7.5 feet (2.3 m) across the butt, and produced 14,000 feet (4,300 m) of lumber. The Indians referred to sulfur and iron springs near Van Hornesville as Otsquage which translates to 'healing waters', as they attributed them to having great healing and medicinal qualities.

John Concuponk was an Oneida Indian who lived in his wigwam along the creek by Starkville with his wife Canadalacadoa. Upon his death he was buried on the hill behind his wigwam. Then Peter P. Murphy, who was the resident physician in Southville, removed Concuponk's body for his students to study. His wife soon found out what had happened, she attempted to murder the doctor. After she tried this, she was taken to the reservation in Oneida.

In 1794, Mr. VanHorne opened a store in present-day Van Hornesville. By 1800, there was a cloth fulling and finishing mill on the creek. By 1814, there was a carding mill, saw mill, fulling mill, and clover hulling mill in operation halfway between Van Hornesville and Southville. In 1836, Elias Braman and Company built a cotton mill on the creek by Van Hornseville.

== Watershed ==
The Otsquago Creek's 61.3-square-mile (159 km^{2}) watershed accounts for 1.77% of the total Mohawk River watershed. Where the creek rises, it is located in the Town of Stark and the lower half is in the Town of Minden. Within the watershed, the majority of the land is open space, with roughly one third (33.9%) being forested land. The upper part of the watershed is a mix of rural residential, agriculture land, and several small hamlets including Vanhornesville and Stark. Then in the lower part of the watershed, residential and commercial uses mostly in Village of Fort Plain.

The creek has an average slope of 1.5% throughout its entire length. The upper creek has a slope of 3% from the source to the Hamlet of Starkville, then from there downstream has a slope of .8%.

== Hydrology ==
=== Discharge ===
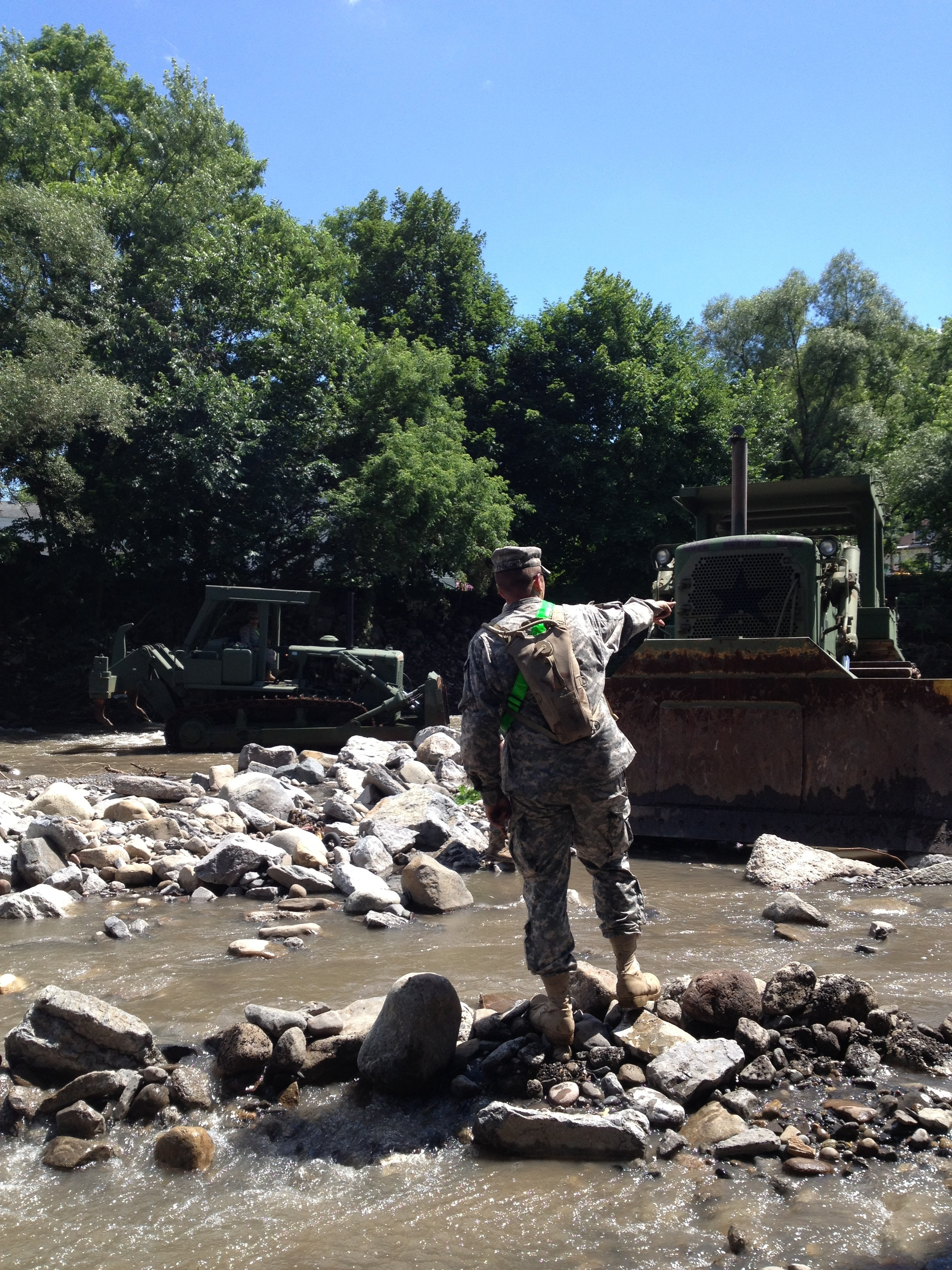
New York Army National Guard clearing debris and widening the creek in Fort Plain after the major flood of June 2013.

The United States Geological Survey (USGS) maintains a stream gauge on the creek .8 miles (1.3 km) upstream from the mouth in the Village of Fort Plain. The station was in operation from October 1949 to September 1989 and then from July 2014 to now. The flood in June 2013 prompted the stream gauge to be reinstalled.

The station had an estimated maximum discharge of 24,600 cubic feet (700 m^{3}) per second and an estimated gauge height of 17.52 feet (5.34 m) on during the flood of June 28, 2013. It had minimum discharge of .6 cubic feet (0.017 m^{3}) per second on November 30, 1964. Prior to the flood of 2013, the maximum discharge was 10,400 cubic feet (290 m^{3}) with a gauge height of 11.24 feet (3.43 m) on October 28, 1981.

=== Flooding ===
Flooding has occurred numerous times on most of the creek, with major damage in the hamlets of Van Hornesville, Starkville and Hallsville, and in the Village of Fort Plain. Flooding is caused in part due to large amounts of coarse sediment being carried downstream from the upper creek during large floods are deposited further downstream and clog bridges. From the mouth to roughly 1,000 feet (300 m) upstream can be effected by backwater flooding from the Mohawk River.

Graph from lower USGS stream gauge showing rise in discharge during February 2017

According to FEMA on September 22, 1938, October 2, 1945, October 17, 1955, and March 11, 1976, there were major floods along the creek. On March 5, 1979, an ice jamming caused the Mohawk River and Otsquago Creek to overflow and caused extensive damage in the Village of Fort Plain. Floodwaters were reported to be four feet deep in the on River Street and Hancock Street in the village. The flooding receded after the washout of the aqueduct on the creek by State Route 5S. Another severe storm caused catastrophic flooding along the Otsquago Creek between June 26 and June 29, 2006.

Then in mid to late June 2013, severe flooding was experienced along the entire creek. The flood of 2013 flooded downtown Fort Plain and extended all the way up the creek to Van Hornesville. Police officers who were knocking on doors when the water was rising got cut off. Residents were unable to get off Abbott Street, which is a dead end road, and escaped up a small hill on the opposite side of creek. A culvert was damaged on Chyle Road and the Owen D. Young Central School was damaged in Van Hornesville. Part of State Route 80 between Van Hornesville and Starkville was entirely washed out. Large amounts of sediment were also carried downstream and deposited which caused flooding to be worse. One fatality was reported in this storm. On July 3, 2013, Senator Charles E. Schumer visited the area and called for quick action from the federal government. A mix of NYSDOT crews, a half-dozen contractors and the National Guard worked to restore the stream bed and roads. In mid July, at the restoration project's peak, there were more than 300 workers on the project.

On February 25, 2017, at around 6:15 pm, 625 residents were told to evacuate as the flood warning siren was activated because of quickly rising waters. After a short time, around 9:30 pm, residents were told it was safe to go home. No major damage occurred during this flood, only a few trees and wires were knocked down and minor stream bank erosion occurred.

== Fishing ==
Fish species present in the creek are brook trout, brown trout and rainbow trout. In 2019 there were 270 8 to 9 inches (20 to 23 cm) brown trout released into the creek in the Town of Minden, and 350 8 to 9 inches (20 to 23 cm) brown trout and 1000 8 to 9 inches (20 to 23 cm) rainbow trout in the Town of Stark.

== Conservation and management ==
In 2015, Dominion energy proposed to expand the compressor station at Brookmans Corners, located near the banks of the creek. Concerns were brought up about the pollution that would be caused, at an estimated 96,683 tons of greenhouse gas emissions would be put into the air every year. These concerns are compounded by Otsquago Creek and the particular topography of the Otsquago valley that limits the dispersion of emissions.

The Robert B. Woodruff Outdoor Learning Center was built and opened in the summer of 1984 and consists of 50 acres (0.078 mi^{2}) within the Otsquago gorge. It is located at the site of an 18th-century trail, which became the road between Fort Plain and Cooperstown in the 19th century. After the trails were built in 1984, it provided better access to the numerous waterfalls in the gorge as well as the limestone caves.

The Young family partnered with Otsego Land Trust to conserve about 147 acres (0.230 mi^{2}) bordering the creek by Van Hornesville, to protect the village's water supply. Another 40 acres (0.063 mi^{2}) was later donated as well to further protect the community's water supply.

== See also ==
- List of rivers of New York
