= 1946 Little Three Conference football season =

American college football season

Little Three
- Sport: Football
- Teams: 3
- Champion: Wesleyan

Football seasons
- 1945 1947

The 1946 Little Three Conference football season was the season of college football played by the three member schools of the Little Three Conference as part of the 1946 college football season.

The Wesleyan Cardinals won the Little Three championship with a perfect 7–0 record and outscored opponents by a total of 165 to 29.

== Conference overview ==
Conf. rank	Team	Head coach	Conf. record	Overall record	Points scored	Points against
1	Wesleyan	Norm Daniels	2–0	7–0	165	29
2	Williams	A. Barr Snively	1–1	2–5	40	90
3	Amherst	Lloyd Jordan	0–2	3–4	84	120

== Teams ==
=== Wesleyan ===
1946 Wesleyan Cardinals football

Little Three champion
- Conference: Little Three
- Record: 7–0 (2–0 Little Three)
- Head coach: Norm Daniels (2nd season)
- Captain: Jack Medd
- Home stadium: North Field

The 1946 Wesleyan Cardinals football team represented Wesleyan University of Middletown, Connecticut. In their second season under head coach Norm Daniels, the Cardinals compiled a perfect 7–0 record, won the Little Three championship, and outscored opponents by a total of 165 to 29. The team ranked 10th nationally among small-college teams in total offense with an average of 267.9 yards per game. It was the first perfect season in the 71-year history of the Wesleyan football program.

The 1946 season was part of a 23-game winning streak, including three consecutive perfect seasons in 1946, 1947, and 1948.

Jack Medd was the team captain. Johnny Wood was an assistant coach. The Cardinals played their home games at North Field in Middletown.

Guard Bert Vander Clute and center Jack Medd were both drafted in the 1947 NFL draft, following the season.

During the fall of 1946, there were 910 students enrolled at Wesleyan.

Date	Opponent	Site	Result	Attendance	Source
October 5	at Swarthmore*	Alumni Field; Swarthmore, PA	W 26–0		
October 12	Connecticut*	North Field; Middletown, CT	W 7–2		
October 19	at Middlebury*	Middlebury, VT	W 26–0	1,200	
October 26	Amherst	North Field; Middletown, CT	W 46–13		
November 2	Haverford*	North Field; Middletown, CT	W 33–0		
November 9	at Williams	Williamstown, MA	W 6–0		
November 16	Trinity (CT)*	North Field; Middletown, CT (rivalry)	W 21–14		
*Non-conference game

=== Williams ===
1946 Williams Ephs football
- Conference: Little Three
- Record: 2–5 (1–1 Little Three)
- Head coach: A. Barr Snively (1st season)

The 1946 Williams Ephs football team represented Williams College of Williamstown, Massachusetts. In their first year under head coach A. Barr Snively, the Cardinals compiled a 2–5 record, finished second in the Little Three, and were outscored by a total of 90 to 40.

Date	Opponent	Site	Result	Attendance	Source
October 5	Middlebury	Weston Field; Williamstown, MA	W 12–6	3,000	
October 12	RPI		L 0–6		
October 19	at Bowdoin	Brunswick, ME	L 0–26		
October 26	Trinity		L 7–19		
November 2	Union		L 0–14		
November 9	Wesleyan	Williamstown, MA	L 0–6		
November 16	at Amherst	Amherst, MA	L 21–31		

=== Amherst ===
1946 Amherst Lord Jeffs football
- Conference: Little Three
- Record: 3–4 (0–2 Little Three)
- Head coach: Lloyd Jordan (13th season)

The 1946 Amherst Lord Jeffs football team represented Amherst College of Amherst, Massachusetts. In their 13th year under head coach Lloyd Jordan, the Lord Jeffs compiled a 3–4 record, finished third in the Little Three, and were outscored by a total of 120 to 84.

Date	Opponent	Site	Result	Attendance	Source
October 5	Coast Guard	Amherst, MA	L 13–14		
October 12	Bowdoin	Amherst, MA	W 7–0		
October 19	Colby	Amherst, MA	W 13–0		
October 26	Wesleyan	North Field; Middletown, CT	L 13–46		
November 2	Tufts	Amherst, MA	W 25–20		
November 9	RPI		L 0–13		
November 16	Williams	Amherst, MA	L 13–21		
