= Valley Brook, New York =

- Hamlet
- Location within New York Location within the United States
- Coordinates: 42°55′44″N 74°39′33″W
- Country: United States
- State: New York
- Region: Central New York
- County: Montgomery
- Town: Minden
- Elevation: 404 ft (123 m)
- Time zone: UTC-5 (Eastern (EST))
  - Summer (DST): UTC-4 (EDT)
- Area codes: 315

Valley Brook is a hamlet located 2 miles (3 km) west of Fort Plain, on NY 80 in Montgomery County, New York, United States. Otsquene Creek enters Otsquago Creek just west of Valley Brook, and Otsquago Creek, a tributary of the Mohawk River, flows east through the hamlet.
