= Lloyd Jordan =

American sports coach (1900–1990)

Biographical details
- Born: December 14, 1900; Punxsutawney, Pennsylvania, U.S.
- Died: February 25, 1990 (aged 89); Richmond, Virginia, U.S.

Playing career

Football
- 1921–1923: Pittsburgh

Basketball
- 1920–1924: Pittsburgh

Coaching career (HC unless noted)

Football
- 1928–1931: Colgate (assistant)
- 1932–1949: Amherst
- 1950–1956: Harvard

Basketball
- 1928–1932: Colgate
- 1932–1948: Amherst

Administrative career (AD unless noted)
- 1960–1974: SoCon (commissioner)

Head coaching record
- Overall: 101–72–8 (football); 159–103 (basketball)

Accomplishments and honors

Championships
- 6 Little Three (1932, 1934, 1936–1938, 1942)

Awards
- Amos Alonzo Stagg Award (1973)
- College Football Hall of Fame; Inducted in 1978 (profile)

Lloyd Paul Jordan (December 14, 1900 – February 25, 1990) was an American football, basketball, and baseball player, coach, and college athletics administrator. He served as the head football coach at Amherst College from 1932 to 1949 and at Harvard University from 1950 to 1956, compiling a career college football record of 101–72–8. Jordan was also the head basketball coach at Colgate University from 1928 to 1932 and at Amherst from 1932 to 1948, tallying a career college basketball mark of 159–103. He played football, basketball, and baseball at the University of Pittsburgh, from which he graduated in 1924. He served as the commissioner of the Southern Conference from 1960 to 1974. Jordan was inducted into the College Football Hall of Fame as a coach in 1978.

Jordan died on February 25, 1990, at his home in Richmond, Virginia.

== Head coaching record ==
=== Football ===
Year	Team	Overall	Conference	Standing	Bowl/playoffs
Amherst Lord Jeffs (Little Three Conference) (1932–1949)
1932	Amherst	6–2	2–0	1st	
1933	Amherst	4–3–1	0–1–1	3rd	
1934	Amherst	5–3	2–0	1st	
1935	Amherst	5–3–1	1–1	2nd	
1936	Amherst	5–2–1	1–1	T–1st	
1937	Amherst	7–1	2–0	1st	
1938	Amherst	6–0–1	2–0	1st	
1939	Amherst	4–4	0–2	3rd	
1940	Amherst	4–4	0–2	3rd	
1941	Amherst	5–3	1–1	2nd	
1942	Amherst	7–0	2–0	1st	
1943	No team—World War II				
1944	No team—World War II				
1945	Amherst	1–3–1	0–0	NA	
1946	Amherst	3–4	0–2	3rd	
1947	Amherst	5–3	1–1	2nd	
1948	Amherst	6–2	1–1	2nd	
1949	Amherst	4–4	1–1	2nd	
Amherst:		77–41–5	16–13–1		
Harvard Crimson (Independent) (1950–1955)
1950	Harvard	1–7			
1951	Harvard	3–5–1			
1952	Harvard	5–4			
1953	Harvard	6–2			
1954	Harvard	4–3–1			
1955	Harvard	3–4–1			
Harvard Crimson (Ivy League) (1956)
1956	Harvard	2–6	2–5	T–6th	
Harvard:		24–31–3	2–5		
Total:		101–72–8			
