= Norm Daniels (American football) =

American athlete and coach (1907–2009)

Biographical details
- Born: March 25, 1907; Detroit, Michigan, U.S.
- Died: May 11, 2009 (aged 102); Middletown, Connecticut, U.S.

Playing career

Football
- 1929–1931: Michigan
- Positions: End, halfback

Coaching career (HC unless noted)

Football
- 1945–1963: Wesleyan

Basketball
- 1944–1947: Wesleyan

Baseball
- 1941–1973: Wesleyan

Head coaching record
- Overall: 76–61–10 (football); 26–16 (basketball); 253–261–6 (baseball)

Norman Joseph Daniels (March 25, 1907 – May 11, 2009) was an American athlete and coach. He played basketball, football and baseball for the University of Michigan from 1928 to 1932. He served for 39 years as a professor of physical education and coach at Wesleyan University from 1934 to 1973, including 33 years as the school's head baseball coach, 19 years as the head football coach, nine years as the head wrestling coach, three years as the head basketball coach, and two years as the head squash coach. He led the Wesleyan football team to four consecutive undefeated seasons from 1945 to 1948.

== Michigan ==
Daniels was born in Detroit, Michigan in 1907. He attended the University of Michigan where he received nine varsity letters in football, basketball and baseball. He won All-Big Ten and All-America honors in basketball and was the leading scorer for the 1930–31 and 1931–32 Michigan basketball teams with 152 and 148 points, respectively. He also held the second base position for the baseball team, and played at the right end and halfback positions for the football teams from 1929 to 1931. After graduating from Michigan in 1932, Daniels became a teacher and coach at a secondary school in Hillsdale, Michigan.

== Wesleyan ==
In 1934, one of Daniels' coaches from the University of Michigan, Jack Blott, was hired as the head football coach at Wesleyan University. Daniels joined Blott at Wesleyan in 1934 as a physical education instructor and as an assistant football coach responsible for the ends and backs. Daniels remained at Wesleyan for 39 years, holding positions as the head coach of the football, basketball, baseball, wrestling, and squash teams. He was the school's head baseball coach for 33 years (1941 to 1973), the head football coach for 19 years (1945 to 1963), the head wrestling coach for nine years, the head basketball coach for three years (1944 to 1947), and the head squash coach for two years (1948 to 1950). He was named a full professor at Wesleyan in 1948. In his 19 years as the head football coach, Daniels compiled a record of 76–61–10. He led the football team to a 25-game win streak, including four consecutive undefeated seasons from 1945 to 1948. After the 1948 season, Associated Press sports writer Lou Black wrote: "Want to know who really is the coach of the year? He's mild mannered Norm Daniels, the wizard of Wesleyan."

In 1959, Daniels traveled with the baseball team on preseason trip to the South. When Daniels was told that a black player, Lenny Moore, could not stay at a hotel in Georgia, Daniels took the team from the hotel. In Florida, an opposing school refused to play Wesleyan unless Moore was removed from the lineup; Daniels pulled his team from the field.

== Later years and honors ==
Daniels retired after the baseball season in 1973. He was named to the American Baseball Coaches Association Hall of Fame in 1974.

Daniels remained active in his later years, serving on the Middletown City Council in the late 1960s and early 1970s. He also drove a van for Kuhn Employment Opportunities, an organization that assists people with disabilities to secure employment.

On April 5, 2007, Daniels celebrated his 100th birthday with a party in the lobby of Wesleyan's Freeman Athletic Center. In 2008, Daniels became one of the inaugural inductees into the Wesleyan University Athletics Hall of Fame.

In May 2009, Daniels died at age 102 at the Kimberly Hall nursing home in Windsor, Connecticut. He was survived by a daughter, Diana Mahoney, a son, David, 10 grandchildren and 18 great-grandchildren. A memorial service was held for Daniels at the South Congregational Church in Middletown, Connecticut, followed by a reception in the Coach Norm Daniels Lobby in the Freeman Athletic Center at Wesleyan.

== Head coaching record ==
=== Football ===
Year	Team	Overall	Conference	Standing	Bowl/playoffs
Wesleyan Cardinals (Little Three) (1945–1963)
1945	Wesleyan	3–0–1			
1946	Wesleyan	7–0	2–0	1st	
1947	Wesleyan	7–0	2–0	1st	
1948	Wesleyan	8–0	2–0	1st	
1949	Wesleyan	4–4			
1950	Wesleyan	1–5–2			
1951	Wesleyan	3–4–1			
1952	Wesleyan	5–2–1			
1953	Wesleyan	3–3–2			
1954	Wesleyan	3–5			
1955	Wesleyan	5–3			
1956	Wesleyan	2–4–2			
1957	Wesleyan	4–4			
1958	Wesleyan	4–4			
1959	Wesleyan	3–5			
1960	Wesleyan	5–2–1			
1961	Wesleyan	1–7			
1962	Wesleyan	3–5			
1963	Wesleyan	4–4			
Wesleyan:		76–61–10			
Total:		76–61–10			
National championship Conference title Conference division title or championship game berth
