= A. Barr Snively =

American sports coach

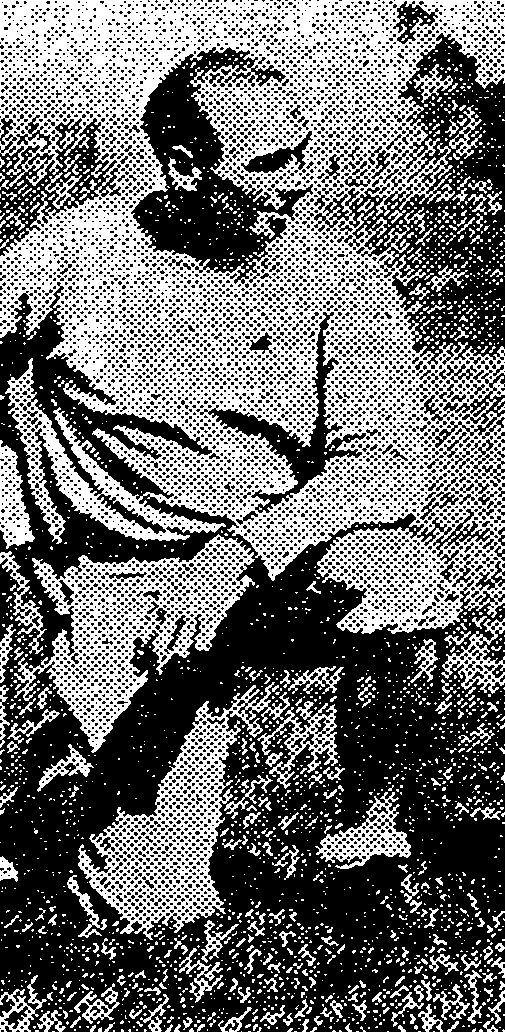
- Snively as Brown's line coach in 1929

Biographical details
- Born: February 9, 1899; Waynesboro, Pennsylvania, U.S.
- Died: April 15, 1964 (aged 65); Durham, New Hampshire, U.S.

Playing career

Football
- 1921–1923: Princeton
- Positions: Guard, end, back

Coaching career (HC unless noted)

Football
- 1928: Williams (line)
- 1929–1931: Brown (line)
- 1932–1942: Williams (line)
- 1945: Williams (line)
- 1946–1947: Williams
- 1948: Maine (assistant)
- 1949–1951: Clarkson
- 1953–1963: New Hampshire (line)

Ice hockey
- 1932–1942: Williams
- 1945–1948: Williams
- 1962–1964: New Hampshire

Lacrosse
- 1932–1942: Williams
- 1946–1948: Williams

Head coaching record
- Overall: 32–41 (lacrosse); 88–79–10 (ice hockey)

Accomplishments and honors

Championships
- National (1922)

Awards
- F. Morris Touchstone Award (1964)

Abraham Barr Snively II (February 9, 1899 – April 15, 1964) was an American football player and coach of lacrosse, football, and ice hockey. He played football for Princeton University from 1921 to 1923 and was captain of the 1923 team. He held coaching positions at Williams College in lacrosse, football and hockey from 1928 to 1948 and at the University of New Hampshire from 1953 to 1964.

== Early years ==
Snively was a native of Waynesboro, Pennsylvania. He was the son of A. Barr Snively I (c. 1869 – October 1944), a prominent physician and surgeon in Waynesboro, and Mary Carlisle Snively. Snively played football at Waynesboro High School on a team that The Daily News (Frederick, Maryland) called "the best foot ball team ever representing the Waynesboro High School."

Snively served in the U.S. military during World War I. After leaving the military, Snively enrolled at Mercersburg Academy where he received varsity letters in five sports, graduating in 1919. He subsequently attended Princeton University from which he graduated in 1924. He played as a guard for the Princeton Tigers football team from 1921 to 1923. Despite playing in the line, Snively became known as "the best forward-passer in the East." In December 1922, he was voted as the captain of the 1923 Princeton football team. Throughout his athletic career as a player and coach, Snively was known by the nickname "Whoop" (sometimes "Whoops").

== Coaching career ==
In 1925, Snively became the head coach of the Rumford High School football team in Rumford, Maine.

In 1928, Snively became an assistant football coach, in charge of linemen, at Williams College, working under College Football Hall of Fame inductee Charlie Caldwell. In April 1929, Snively was hired by Brown University as its line coach under head coach Tuss McLaughry. Snively also coached lacrosse at Brown.

Snively returned to Williams College in 1932. Over the next 11 years, he resumed his duties as line coach for the football team and also served as the head coach of the lacrosse and men's ice hockey teams.

Snively took a leave of absence from Williams in 1942 to serve with the Red Cross in the Pacific Theater of Operations during World War II. Williams discontinued its football program during the war years from 1943 to 1945.

In March 1945, Williams was hired as an assistant football coach at Dartmouth College under head coach Tuss McLaughry.

Snively returned to Williams in September 1945 and resumed his posts as football line coach and head coach for the hockey and lacrosse team. In January 1946, he became the head football coach at Williams; he held that position for the 1946 and 1947 seasons. Snively noted that his greatest love in sports was ice hockey, and he coached the Williams College men's ice hockey team for 16 years. While at Williams, Snively also coached freshman teams and varsity lacrosse teams. In February 1948, Snively was replaced by Len Watters as Williams' head football coach, though he continued to serve thereafter as the school's lacrosse and hockey coach.

In the fall of 1948, Snively served as an assistant football coach at the University of Maine under head coach Eck Allen.

From 1949 through the 1951, Snively was the head football coach at Clarkson University. When Clarkson discontinued football in 1952, Snively became the school's director of intramural athletics.

In March 1953, Snively was hired by the University of New Hampshire as the line coach for its football team and as the head coach for its lacrosse team. He held those positions for the next 12 years. His lacrosse teams at New Hampshire compiled and 84–43 record and won a national divisional championship and five New England divisional championships. He was also the men's ice hockey coach at New Hampshire from 1962 to 1964.

== Death and posthumous honors ==
In April 1964, Snively died of a heart attack while at a gas station in Durham, New Hampshire. He was survived by his wife, Eva (Owen) Snively; a son, A. Barr Snively III, and a daughter, Virginia O. Snively.

In December 1964, the United States Intercollegiate Lacrosse Association posthumously voted Snively its Coach of the Year award. Snively's lacrosse teams accumulated 116 victories, including his 85–47 record at New Hampshire. He had also coached lacrosse at Brown, Williams, Clarkson and Maine. In February 1965, the University of New Hampshire dedicated Snively Arena, named after Coach Snively, to be used by the institution's hockey team and for other athletic events. The A. Barr "Whoop" Snively Scholarship Fund was established in 1966. It provides scholarship support to a third-year student who has participated in hockey, lacrosse, or football.

== Head coaching record ==
=== Ice hockey ===
Record table
Season	Team	Overall	Conference	Standing	Postseason
Williams Ephs Independent (1932–1942)
1932–33	Williams	0–4–2			
1933–34	Williams	5–3–0			
1934–35	Williams	6–3–1			
1935–36	Williams	6–3–0			
1936–37	Williams	5–3–1			
1937–38	Williams	10–3–1			
1938–39	Williams	5–5–0			
1939–40	Williams	6–5–0			
1940–41	Williams	6–2–0			
1941–42	Williams	4–3–0			
Williams:		53–34–5			
Williams Ephs Independent (1945–1949)
1945–46	Williams	1–4–0			
1946–47	Williams	2–7–0			
1947–48	Williams	4–3–2			
1948–49	Williams	5–9–0			
Williams:		12–23–2			
New Hampshire Wildcats (ECAC Hockey) (1962–1964)
1962–63	New Hampshire	10–10–0	9–10–0	13th	
1963–64	New Hampshire	13–12–0	13–12–0	15th	
New Hampshire:		23–22–0	22–22–0		
Total:		88–79–10			
National champion Postseason invitational champion Conference regular season champion Conference regular season and conference tournament champion Division regular season champion Division regular season and conference tournament champion Conference tournament champion
