= 1948 Wesleyan Cardinals football team =

College football season

1948 Wesleyan Cardinals football

Little Three champion
- Conference: Little Three
- Record: 8–0 (2–0 Little Three)
- Head coach: Norm Daniels (4th season)

The 1948 Wesleyan Cardinals football team, also known as the Wesleyan Methodists, was an American football that represented Wesleyan University as an independent during the 1948 college football season. In their fourth season under head coach Norm Daniels, the Cardinals compiled a perfect 8–0 record, won the Little Three championship, and outscored opponents by a total of 224 to 34.

The 1948 season was part of a 23-game winning streak, including three consecutive perfect seasons in 1946, 1947, and 1948.

== Schedule ==
Date	Opponent	Site	Result	Attendance	Source
October 2	Bowdoin	Middletown, CT	W 13–0		
October 9	at Coast Guard	New London, CT	W 20–7		
October 16	at Swarthmore	Swarthmore, PA	W 41–20		
October 23	Amherst	Middletown, CT	W 27–0		
October 30	New England	Andrus Field; Middletown, CT	W 53–0		
November 6	at Williams	Williamstown, MA	W 28–7		
November 13	Trinity (CT)	Andrus Field; Middletown, CT (rivalry)	W 16–0		
November 20	at Rochester	River Campus Stadium; Rochester, NY	W 26–0	> 5,000	

== NFL draft ==
The following Cardinal was selected in the 1949 NFL draft following the season.

Round	Pick	Player	Position	NFL team
10	93	John Geary	Tackle	New York Bulldogs
