= 1947 Wesleyan Cardinals football team =

College football season

1947 Wesleyan Cardinals football

Little Three champion
- Conference: Little Three
- Record: 7–0 (2–0 Little Three)
- Head coach: Norm Daniels (3rd season)
- Home stadium: Andrus Field

The 1947 Wesleyan Cardinals football team, also known as the Wesleyan Methodists, was an American football that represented Wesleyan University as an independent during the 1947 college football season. In their third season under head coach Norm Daniels, the Cardinals compiled a perfect 7–0 record, won the Little Three championship, and outscored opponents by a total of 141 to 28.

The 1947 season was part of a 23-game winning streak, including three consecutive perfect seasons in 1946, 1947, and 1948.

The team played its home games at Andrus Field in of Middletown, Connecticut.

== Schedule ==
Date	Opponent	Site	Result	Attendance	Source
October 4	WPI*	Andrus Field; Middletown, CT	W 19–0		
October 11	at Connecticut*	Gardner Dow Athletic Fields; Storrs, CT	W 12–0	7,500	
October 18	Swarthmore*	Andrus Field; Middletown, CT	W 40–7		
October 25	at Amherst	Amherst, MA	W 20–0		
November 1	at Haverford*	Haverford, PA	W 25–15		
November 8	Williams	Andrus Field; Middletown, CT	W 12–6		
November 15	at Trinity (CT)*	Trinity Field; Hartford, CT (rivalry)	W 13–0	9,000	
*Non-conference game

== NFL draft ==
The following Cardinal was selected in 1948 NFL draft following the season.

Round	Pick	Player	Position	NFL team
9	69	Jim Burton	End	Boston Yanks
