= Van Hornesville, New York =

- Hamlet
- Location within New York Location within the United States
- Coordinates: 42°53′42″N 74°49′40″W
- Country: United States
- State: New York
- County: Herkimer
- Town: Stark
- Elevation: 1,152 ft (351 m)
- Time zone: UTC-5 (Eastern (EST))
  - Summer (DST): UTC-4 (EDT)
- ZIP code: 13475
- Area codes: 315

Van Hornesville is a hamlet in the town of Stark, north of Springfield Center, on NY 80 in Herkimer County, New York, United States. Van Hornesville has a post office with the ZIP Code 13475.
