= 1940 NCAA basketball championship game =

American collegiate basketball final

1940 NCAA Tournament Championship Game
National championship game
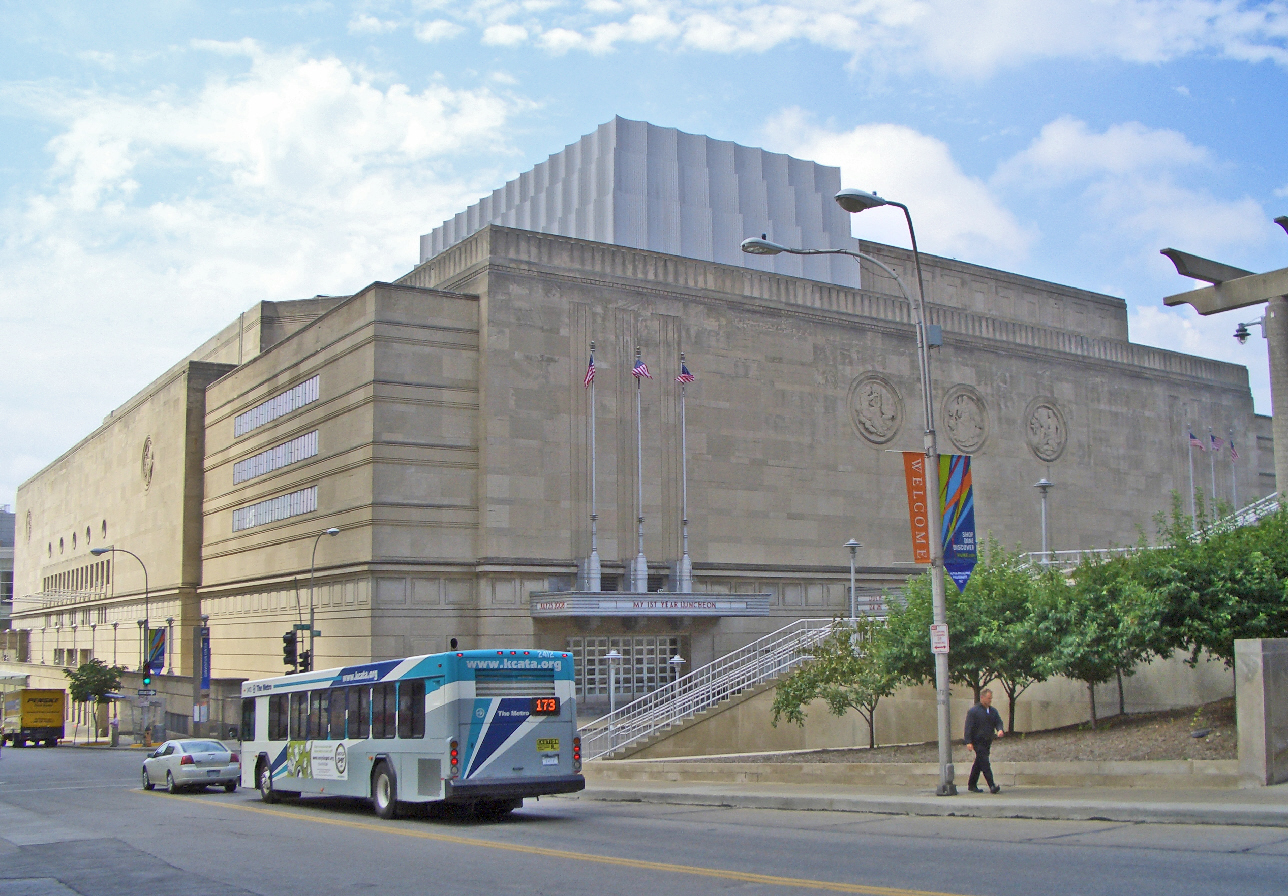
- The Municipal Auditorium in Kansas City, Missouri, hosted the championship game.
Indiana Hoosiers	Kansas Jayhawks
Big Ten	Big Six
(19–3)	(15–7)
60	42
Head coach: Branch McCracken	Head coach: Phog Allen
	1st half	2nd half	Total
Indiana Hoosiers	32	28	60
Kansas Jayhawks	19	23	42
- Date: March 30, 1940
- Venue: Municipal Auditorium, Kansas City, Missouri
- MVP: Marvin Huffman, Indiana
- Referees: Gil MacDonald, Ted O'Sullivan
- Attendance: 10,000

The 1940 NCAA Basketball Championship Game was the final of the 1940 NCAA basketball tournament and determined the national champion in the 1939–40 NCAA men's basketball season. The game was held at the Municipal Auditorium in Kansas City, Missouri, on March 30, 1940. The Indiana Hoosiers defeated the Kansas Jayhawks 60–42 to win the school's first national championship in men's basketball.

== Background ==
=== Indiana ===
The Hoosiers' head coach was Branch McCracken, who was in his second season on the job. In the previous season, 1938–39, Indiana had a 9–3 record in Big Ten Conference play, second behind Ohio State. On December 9, 1939, the Hoosiers opened the season with a 13-point win over Wabash; two days later, they routed Xavier 58–24. They finished 1939 unbeaten at 7–0, with their closest game a two-point victory over Duquesne. On January 6, 1940, the Hoosiers played their first Big Ten game against Illinois, winning 38–36 in a contest that came down to the closing moments. After a 45–40 win over Iowa, the Hoosiers suffered their first loss of the season, falling to Minnesota 46–44. The team bounced back with victories over Wisconsin and DePaul, before a 46–39 win over Purdue on February 10 which gave the Hoosiers a share of first place in the conference. Although Indiana subsequently defeated Michigan by 27 points, the club lost two of its next four games, to Northwestern and Ohio State. However, the Hoosiers ended their regular season by beating Purdue again and Ohio State, who they had previously lost against.

Indiana finished the regular season 17–3 and 9–3 in Big Ten play, one game behind conference winner Purdue; however, Purdue did not receive an NCAA Tournament invitation. While reports have indicated that a bid was declined by Boilermakers coach Ward Lambert, selection committee member Tony Hinkle said years after the event that Indiana was selected to appear in the tournament because the school was considered the "most representative team" in the Midwest. The invitation was approved by Indiana's faculty athletics committee, after McCracken supported appearing in the event. In the quarterfinals of the eight-team NCAA Tournament, the Hoosiers faced Springfield, winning 48–24. Herm Schaefer scored 14 of the 48 Hoosier points, and Springfield was held to 13% shooting in the game. That result earned them a berth in the Final Four, in which Duquesne was their opponent; the Dukes had already had a runner-up finish in the 1940 National Invitation Tournament. By a 39–30 score, Indiana defeated Duquesne to earn a spot in the championship game. Bill Menke had a team-high 10 points for the Hoosiers.

=== Kansas ===
Phog Allen was the coach of the Jayhawks; he was in his 23rd season in the role across two stints. In the 1938–39 season, Kansas had a 6–4 record in conference play, and was 13–7 overall. The Jayhawks' first game of the season was a 34–30 win over Oklahoma A&M on December 5; three days later, they lost in overtime at Warrensburg. Following that defeat, the Jayhawks won their next eight games, including two victories over SMU and a 46–26 win over Oklahoma on January 5. On January 18, Missouri dealt the Jayhawks a 42–31 defeat; the team responded with wins over Nebraska and Iowa State, before a loss to Oklahoma A&M. Kansas then won their next four games, before defeats to Creighton and Oklahoma that ended the regular season. The Jayhawks faced Oklahoma again in a conference playoff game, winning 45–39.

Kansas was placed in the West region of the NCAA Tournament, with their first game against Rice. The Jayhawks took a 10-point lead into halftime and held on to win 50–44. With 21 points, Howard Engleman was responsible for nearly half of the Jawhawks' total output. Kansas then faced USC in the regional final. In a closely contested game, the Jayhawks advanced with a 43–42 victory. Richard Harp led Kansas with 15 points.

== Game summary ==
The 1940 national championship game ended the first NCAA men's basketball tournament administered by the organization, after the 1939 event was run by the National Association of Basketball Coaches (NABC). After the inaugural tournament lost money for the NABC, the group gave the rights to hold the event to the NCAA in exchange for the organization taking on the debt and giving NABC coaches future championship game tickets. The game was held on March 30, 1940, at the Municipal Auditorium in Kansas City, Missouri; the same arena also hosted the national title game in the following two years. The audience was mainly composed of Jayhawks fans, as the arena was approximately 40 miles from Kansas' campus. The game attracted a crowd of approximately 10,000 people, who paid a reported total of $8,509 for their tickets. Along with the previous rounds, the revenue from the final more than covered the debt from 1939. Prior to the encounter, a ceremony was held to honor James Naismith, the inventor of basketball, who had died in November 1939.

Indiana won the opening tip, but was unable to score despite gathering two offensive rebounds. Kansas was also held scoreless on their first possession after a missed free throw. The Hoosiers' Curly Armstrong registered the first point with a made free throw two minutes into the game. At the start of the encounter, Kansas sought to slow down the Hoosiers by utilizing an attacking defense aimed at forcing Indiana's ball-handlers towards the center of the court. The strategy proved effective, as the Hoosiers were held without a field goal for the first eight minutes. The teams traded scores during the early play. Five minutes into the game, the Jayhawks had tallied 10 points and held the lead. Baskets by Marvin Huffman, Jay McCreary, and Bob Dro brought the Hoosiers to an 11–11 tie and forced a timeout by the Jayhawks. Afterwards, the Hoosiers took control of the contest with a faster-paced offense than Kansas. Indiana tied the game at 11, behind the efforts of reserve McCreary, Huffman, and Dro, and had the better of the play for the rest of the period. Although they held a slim 17–14 lead with seven minutes left in the first half, the Hoosiers outscored the Jayhawks 15–5 during the rest of the period, using a quick-tempo offense that led USC head coach Sam Barry to say following the contest, "I knew Indiana was fast, but not that fast." At the end of the first half, the Hoosiers held a 32–19 advantage.

In the second half, Phog Allen's son, Bob, attempted to help Kansas remain competitive with five field goals and a pair of made free throws to lead the Jayhawks. However, the Jayhawks were affected by the quick offensive attacks of the Hoosiers, which led to a large number of fouls. By the start of the half, Ralph Miller had already accumulated four personal fouls. The Hoosiers also ran into foul trouble, as Huffman and Dro both reached four fouls for the game. McCreary paced the Hoosiers' offense in the second half, recording 10 points. Allen was forced out of the game after a hard landing on the floor, although he eventually returned. Indiana expanded its lead slightly in the half and won, 60–42, to claim the national championship. McCracken accepted the championship trophy from Oregon head coach Howard Hobson, whose team had won the previous year's title. Huffman was selected as the tournament's Most Outstanding Player.

== Statistical summary ==
The Hoosiers made 26 field goals in the game, out of 74 attempts, and converted on eight of their eleven free throw attempts. Huffman and McCreary each scored 12 points to lead the Hoosiers. Armstrong added 10 points, while Herman Schaefer had 9 and Dro tallied 7. For the Jayhawks, Allen contributed 13 points, making him the game's leading scorer. Engleman had 12 points, but no other Kansas player had more than 5 points. Kansas made 15 field goals, 11 fewer than Indiana, and missed eight of 20 free throw tries, along with over 60 field goal attempts. The teams combined to commit a total of 30 personal fouls, 19 of which were committed by the Hoosiers. The accumulation of fouls led to the disqualification of three players.

== Aftermath ==
In the following season, Indiana had a record of 17–3, with a 10–2 mark in conference play. This left the Hoosiers in second place, one game behind Wisconsin. The 1940 national championship game was the first of six appearances in the NCAA Tournament final for the Hoosiers, and the first of five times they won the title. The team did not return to the NCAA Tournament until 1953, when they won their second championship under McCracken.

Kansas' appearance in the 1940 national championship game was the first of nine in the program's history. The Jayhawks posted a 12–6 record in 1940–41, and their 7–3 Big Six record tied them for first in the conference with Iowa State. However, the team did not receive an NCAA Tournament invitation. Kansas returned to the event in 1942, but lost in the regional semifinals. Under Allen, the Jayhawks made two further title game appearances, and in 1952 won the championship for the first time.
