= List of Kansas Jayhawks men's basketball head coaches =

The University of Kansas' men's basketball team plays at the Division I level of the National Collegiate Athletic Association (NCAA) in the Big 12 Conference. The men's basketball program officially began in 1898, following the arrival of Dr. James Naismith to the school, just six years after Naismith had written the sport's first official rules. Kansas has had only eight head coaches in the 128 years of basketball at the University of Kansas.

Years	Duration of head coaching career at Kansas
Record	Number of career games won-lost at Kansas
Percent	Percentage of games won at Kansas

Years	Coach	Record	Percent	Notes and honors
1898–1907	Dr. James Naismith	55–60	.478	Retired James Naismith • Inventor of the game of Basketball • Only Coach in Kansas Basketball history with a losing record
1907–1909, 1919–1956	Dr. Forrest "Phog" Allen	590–219	.729	Retired • Known as the "Father Of Basketball Coaching" for his innovations of the modern game • Created the National Association of Basketball Coaches (NABC) • Successfully lobbied to make the game of basketball an Olympic sport • Helped to create the modern NCAA tournament, which began in 1939 • 1952 NCAA Championship • 1922 and 1923 Helms Championships • 1940 and 1953 Final Fours • 24 Conference regular season championships (1908, 1909, 1922–1927, 1931–1934, 1936–1938, 1940–1943, 1946, 1950, 1952–1954) • Inducted into Basketball Hall of Fame in 1959 • Inducted into College Basketball Hall of Fame in 2006
1909–1919	William O. Hamilton	125–59	.679	Resigned • 5 Conference regular season championships (1910, 1911, 1912, 1914, 1915)
1956–1964	Dick Harp	121–82	.596	Resigned • 1957 Final Four • 2 Conference regular season championships (1957, 1960)
1964–1983	Ted Owens	348–182	.657	Fired • 1971 and 1974 Final Fours • 6 Conference regular season championships (1966, 1967, 1971, 1974, 1975, 1978) • 1 Conference tournament championship (1981) • 1978 Basketball Weekly Coach of the Year
1983–1988	Larry Brown	135–44	.754	Accepted position as head coach of the San Antonio Spurs • 1988 NCAA Championship • 1986 Final Four • 1 Conference regular season championship (1986) • 2 Conference tournament championships (1984, 1986) • 1988 Naismith College Coach of the Year • Inducted into Basketball Hall of Fame in 2002 • Inducted into College Basketball Hall of Fame in 2006
1988–2003	Roy Williams	418–101	.805	Accepted position as head coach at North Carolina Roy Williams • 1991, 1993, 2002, 2003 Final Fours • 9 Conference regular season championships (1991, 1992, 1993, 1995, 1996, 1997, 1998, 2002, 2003) • 4 Conference tournament championships (1992, 1997, 1998, 1999) • 1990 Henry Iba Award Coach of the Year • 1992 AP Coach of the Year • 1997 Naismith College Coach of the Year • Inducted into Basketball Hall of Fame in 2007 • Inducted into College Basketball Hall of Fame in 2006
2003–present	Bill Self	634–167	.792	Bill Self • 2008 and 2022 NCAA Championship • 2012 and 2018 Final Fours • 14 Consecutive Conference regular season championships and 16 Regular season Conference Championships Overall (2005, 2006, 2007, 2008, 2009, 2010, 2011, 2012, 2013, 2014, 2015, 2016, 2017, 2018, 2020, 2022) • 8 Conference tournament championships (2006, 2007, 2008, 2010, 2011, 2013, 2016, 2022) • 2009 and 2016 AP Coach of the Year • 2016 National Association of Basketball Coaches Coach of the Year • 2016 USA Today National Coach of the Year • 2016 Bleacher Report's National Coach of the Year • 2012 Naismith College Coach of the Year • 2013 John R. Wooden Award Legends of Coaching Award • 2012 Adolph Rupp Cup • 2009 Henry Iba Award for Coach of the Year • 2006, 2009, 2011, 2012, 2017, 2018 Big 12 Conference Men's Basketball Coach of the Year • 2006, 2009, 2011, 2015, 2016 AP Big 12 Coach of the Year • Inducted into Basketball Hall of Fame in 2017

Notes:
- In 1919, Karl Schlademan coached, and won, the first game of the season before relinquishing the coaching position to Allen in order to concentrate on his duties as head track coach.
- In 1947, Howard Engleman coached 14 games (going 8–6) after Allen was ordered to take a rest following the 13th game of the season. Engleman's record is not listed in this table as he was never officially a head coach at the university.
- In 2022, assistant coach Norm Roberts coached and won 4 games after KU Athletics suspended Bill Self and assistant coach Kurtis Townsend in connection with a 2017 NCAA investigation into the Jayhawks recruiting program.
