= Bob Dro =

American basketball player and coach

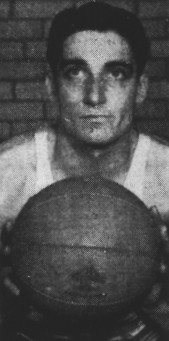
- Dro, circa 1941

Personal information
- Born: October 12, 1918 Berne, Indiana, U.S.
- Died: May 4, 2006 (aged 87) Indianapolis, Indiana, U.S.
- Listed height: 6 ft 0 in (1.83 m)
- Listed weight: 190 lb (86 kg)

Career information
- High school: Berne (Berne, Indiana)
- College: Indiana (1938–1941)
- Position: Guard

Career history

Playing
- 1941–1942: Indianapolis Kautskys

Coaching
- 1946–1948: Bluffton HS

Career highlights
- NCAA champion (1940); First-team All-Big Ten (1941); Indiana Basketball Hall of Fame (1978)

Robert Chester Dro (October 12, 1918 – May 4, 2006) was an American basketball player and college athletic administrator. He was a starter on Indiana Hoosiers men's basketball's first championship team in 1940 and played one season in the National Basketball League.

Dro, a 6'0" guard from Berne High School in Berne, Indiana, played for coach Branch McCracken at Indiana from 1938 to 1941. Dro was a three-year starter for them, including the Hoosiers' 1939–40 championship season. He was named first-team All-Big Ten Conference as a senior in 1941. Dro was also a standout on the baseball diamond in college.

Following college, Dro played a season with the Indianapolis Kautskys of the National Basketball League (NBL), a professional league that would later merge with the Basketball Association of America to form the National Basketball Association. Dro also played minor league baseball for the Grand Rapids Colts in the Brooklyn Dodgers organization.

After his brief professional sports career, Dro served in the United States Navy during World War II. Upon his return from the war, Dro coached high school basketball in Pendleton and Bluffton, Indiana. In 1957, Dro joined the Indiana University athletic department, where he served until his retirement in 1984.

Dro was inducted into the Indiana Basketball Hall of Fame in 1978.
