= Bill Menke =

American basketball player (1918–1945)

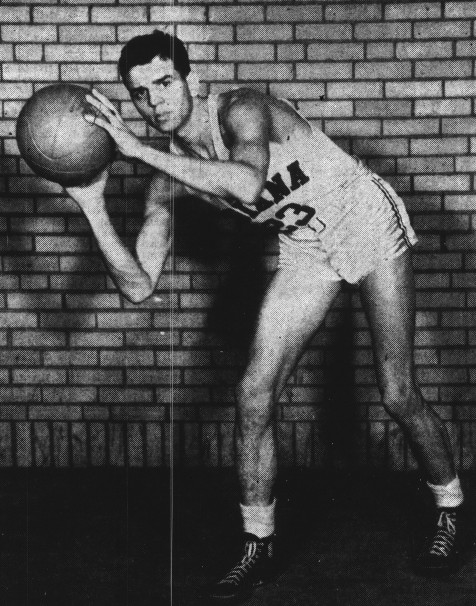
Menke, circa 1939

William Charles Menke (October 16, 1918 – January 7, 1945) was an American basketball player. He was an NCAA All-American at Indiana University and a starter on the school's first championship team in 1940.

Menke, a 6'3" center from Huntingburg High School in Huntingburg, Indiana and Kemper Military School, played for coach Branch McCracken at Indiana from 1938 to 1941, averaging 8.8 points per game for his career. Menke was named a third team All-American by Converse during the Hoosiers' 1939–40 championship season, joining teammate Marvin Huffman on the All-America team. His younger brother, Bob, was also his teammate at Indiana.

Menke graduated as the Hoosiers' all-time leading scorer with 530 points, although this record has since been eclipsed. Following his college career, Menke played in the Amateur Athletic Association with the Great Lakes Naval Training Station team. Menke died in a plane crash during World War II while serving with the United States Navy. Menke was inducted into the Indiana Basketball Hall of Fame in 1988.
