= 1939–40 Indiana Hoosiers men's basketball team =

American college basketball season

1939–40 Indiana Hoosiers men's basketball

NCAA tournament National champions

National Championship Game, W 60–42 vs. Kansas
- Conference: Big Ten Conference
- Record: 20–3 (9–3 Big Ten)
- Head coach: Branch McCracken (2nd season)
- Assistant coach: Ralph Graham
- Captain: Marv Huffman
- Home arena: The Fieldhouse

1939–40 Big Ten Conference men's basketball standings
	Conf.				Overall
Team	W		L	PCT	W		L	PCT
Purdue	10	–	2	.833	16	–	4	.800
Indiana	9	–	3	.750	20	–	3	.870
Ohio State	8	–	4	.667	13	–	7	.650
Illinois	7	–	5	.583	14	–	6	.700
Northwestern	7	–	5	.583	13	–	7	.650
Michigan	6	–	6	.500	13	–	7	.650
Minnesota	5	–	7	.417	12	–	8	.600
Iowa	4	–	8	.333	9	–	12	.429
Wisconsin	3	–	9	.250	5	–	15	.250
Chicago	1	–	11	.083	5	–	15	.250

The 1939–40 Indiana Hoosiers men's basketball team represented Indiana University. Their head coach was Branch McCracken, who was in his 2nd year. The team played its home games in The Fieldhouse in Bloomington, Indiana, and was a member of the Big Ten Conference.

The Hoosiers finished the regular season with an overall record of 17–3 and a conference record of 9–3, finishing 2nd in the Big Ten Conference to the Purdue Boilermakers. Purdue was invited to participate in the 8-team NCAA tournament, but declined their bid recommending IU play in the tournament in their place. In only the second national tournament, IU won their first NCAA Tournament Championship by defeating Kansas, 60–42, in the final. Indiana was also retroactively listed as the top team of the season by the Premo-Porretta Power Poll.

== Roster ==
No.	Name	Position	Ht.	Year	Hometown
7	Andy Zimmer	C	6–4	So.	Goodland, Indiana
9	Chet Francis	G	6–1	Jr.	Avon, Indiana
10	Harold Zimmer	F	5–8	Jr.	Springfield, Ohio
11	Everett Hoffman	C	6–3	So.	Evansville, Indiana
12	Jim Gridley	G	6–1	Jr.	Vevay, Indiana
13	Jim Ooley	G	6–2	Sr.	Spencer, Indiana
16	James Clifton	C	6–3	Jr.	Bentonville, Indiana
18	Cliff Wiethoff	F	6–1	So.	Seymour, Indiana
19	Ed Newby	G	5–11	So.	Indianapolis, Indiana
20	Jack Stevenson	F	6–1	Sr.	Indianapolis, Indiana
21	Max Hasler	G	5–10	So.	Elnora, Indiana
22	Jay McCreary	G	5–10	Jr.	Frankfort, Indiana
23	Don Huckleberry	G	5–9	So.	Salem, Indiana
24	John Torphy	F	5–11	So.	Bedford, Indiana
25	Bill Frey	F	6–1	So.	Kokomo, Indiana
26	Tom Motter	F	6–1	Jr.	Fort Wayne, Indiana
28	William Torphy	G	6–1	So.	Bedford, Indiana
29	Robert Menke	F	6–3	Jr.	Huntingburg, Indiana
30	Ralph Dorsey	F	5–10	Sr.	Horse Cave, Kentucky
32	Herm Schaefer	F	6–1	Jr.	Fort Wayne, Indiana
33	Curly Armstrong	F	5–11	Jr.	Fort Wayne, Indiana
34	Marv Huffman	G	6–2	Sr.	New Castle, Indiana
35	William Menke	C	6–3	Jr.	Huntingburg, Indiana
38	Bob Dro	G	5–11	Sr.	Berne, Indiana

== Schedule/results ==
Date time, TV	Rank^{#}	Opponent^{#}	Result	Record	Site city, state
Regular season
12/9/1939*		Wabash	W 37–24	1–0	The Fieldhouse; Bloomington, Indiana
12/11/1939*		Xavier	W 58–24	2–0	The Fieldhouse; Bloomington, Indiana
12/15/1939*		at Nebraska	W 49–39	3–0	Nebraska Coliseum; Lincoln, Nebraska
12/18/1939*		Pittsburgh	W 51–35	4–0	The Fieldhouse; Bloomington, Indiana
12/23/1939*		at Butler	W 40–33	5–0	Butler Fieldhouse; Indianapolis
12/27/1939*		at Duquesne	W 51–49	6–0	Duquesne Garden; Pittsburgh
12/28/1939*		at Villanova	W 45–33	7–0	Villanova Field House; Villanova, Pennsylvania
1/6/1940		Illinois; Rivalry	W 38–36	8–0 (1–0)	The Fieldhouse; Bloomington, Indiana
1/8/1940		Iowa	W 45–30	9–0 (2–0)	The Fieldhouse; Bloomington, Indiana
1/13/1940		at Minnesota	L 44–46	9–1 (2–1)	Minnesota Field House; Minneapolis
1/15/1940		at Wisconsin	W 40–34	10–1 (3–1)	Wisconsin Field House; Madison, Wisconsin
2/3/1940*		at DePaul	W 51–30	11–1 (3–1)	University Auditorium; Chicago
2/10/1940		Purdue; Rivalry	W 46–39	12–1 (4–1)	The Fieldhouse; Bloomington, Indiana
2/12/1940		Michigan	W 57–30	13–1 (5–1)	The Fieldhouse; Bloomington, Indiana
2/17/1940		at Northwestern	L 36–40	13–2 (5–2)	Old Patten Gymnasium; Evanston, Illinois
2/19/1940		at Iowa	W 46–42	14–2 (6–2)	Iowa Field House; Iowa City, IA
2/24/1940		Chicago	W 38–34	15–2 (7–2)	The Fieldhouse; Bloomington, Indiana
2/26/1940		at Ohio State	L 26–44	15–3 (7–3)	Ohio Expo Center Coliseum; Columbus, Ohio
3/2/1940		at Purdue; Rivalry	W 51–45	16–3 (8–3)	Lambert Fieldhouse; West Lafayette, Indiana
3/4/1940		Ohio State	W 52–31	17–3 (9–3)	The Fieldhouse; Bloomington, Indiana
NCAA tournament
3/22/1940*		vs. Springfield; Quarterfinals	W 48–24	18–3 (9–3)	Butler Fieldhouse; Indianapolis, IN
3/23/1940*		vs. Duquesne; Final Four	W 39–30	19–3 (9–3)	Butler Fieldhouse; Indianapolis
3/30/1940*		vs. Kansas; Championship	W 60–42	20–3 (9–3)	Municipal Auditorium; Kansas City, Missouri
*Non-conference game. ^{#}Rankings from AP Poll. (#) Tournament seedings in parentheses.

== Awards and honors ==
- Marv Huffman, Consensus second team All-American
- Marv Huffman, NCAA basketball tournament Most Outstanding Player
- Bill Menke, Third team All-American (Converse)
