= 1940–41 Kansas Jayhawks men's basketball team =

American college basketball season

1940–41 Kansas Jayhawks men's basketball

Big Six Co-Champions
- Conference: Big Six Conference
- Record: 12–6 (7–3 Big 6)
- Head coach: Phog Allen (24th season)
- Captains: Robert Allen; Howard Engleman; John Kline
- Home arena: Hoch Auditorium

1940–41 Big Six Conference men's basketball standings
	Conf.				Overall
Team	W		L	PCT	W		L	PCT
Iowa State	7	–	3	.700	15	–	4	.789
Kansas	7	–	3	.700	12	–	6	.667
Nebraska	6	–	4	.600	8	–	10	.444
Oklahoma	5	–	5	.500	6	–	12	.333
Kansas State	3	–	7	.300	6	–	12	.333
Missouri	2	–	8	.200	6	–	10	.375

The 1940–41 Kansas Jayhawks men's basketball team represented the University of Kansas during the 1940–41 college men's basketball season.

== Roster ==
- Robert Allen
- James Arnold
- John Buescher
- Howard Engleman
- Edward Hall
- Vance Hall
- Thomas Hunter
- John Kline
- Norman Sanneman
- Marvin Sollenberger
- Charles Walker

== Schedule ==
Date time, TV	Rank^{#}	Opponent^{#}	Result	Record	Site city, state
December 9*		Texas	W 35–27	1-0	Hoch Auditorium; Lawrence, KS
December 10*		Texas	W 48–45	2-0	Hoch Auditorium; Lawrence, KS
December 28*		at Fordham	L 42–53	2-1	Rose Hill Gymnasium; New York, NY
December 30*		at Temple	L 35–40	2-2	Convention Hall; Philadelphia, PA
January 2*		at Loyola	W 41–40	3-2	Alumni Gym; Chicago, IL
January 8		at Oklahoma	L 31–42	3-3 (0-1)	Field House; Norman, OK
January 13		Iowa State	W 44–41	4-3 (1-1)	Hoch Auditorium; Lawrence, KS
January 16		Missouri; Border War	W 48–41	5-3 (2-1)	Hoch Auditorium; Lawrence, KS
January 20		at Kansas State; Sunflower Showdown	W 46–41	6-3 (3-1)	Nichols Hall; Manhattan, KS
February 3*		at Wichita	W 54–39	7-3	Henrion Gymnasium; Wichita, KS
February 10		Nebraska	W 44–38	8-3 (4-1)	Nebraska Coliseum; Lincoln, NE
February 17*		at Oklahoma A&M	L 26–30	8-4	Gallagher-Iba Arena; Stillwater, OK
February 21		at Missouri; Border War	W 35–24	9-4 (5-1)	Brewer Fieldhouse; Columbia, MO
February 25		Kansas State; Sunflower Showdown	W 50–45	10-4 (6-1)	Hoch Auditorium; Lawrence, KS
March 1		at Nebraska	W 55–53	11-4 (7-1)	Nebraska Coliseum; Lincoln, NE
March 3		at Iowa State	L 29–41	11-5 (7-2)	State Gymnasium; Ames, IA
March 7		Oklahoma	L 37–45	11-6 (7-3)	Hoch Auditorium; Lawrence, KS
March 11		Oklahoma A&M	W 34–31	12-6	Hoch Auditorium; Lawrence, KS
*Non-conference game. ^{#}Rankings from AP Poll. (#) Tournament seedings in parentheses.
