= 1939–40 Kansas Jayhawks men's basketball team =

American college basketball season

1939–40 Kansas Jayhawks men's basketball

NCAA tournament, Runner-up Big Six co-champions

National Championship Game, L 42-60 vs. Indiana
- Conference: Big Six Conference
- Record: 19–6 (8–2 Big 6)
- Head coach: Phog Allen (23rd season)
- Captains: Donald Ebling; Richard Harp
- Home arena: Hoch Auditorium

1939–40 Big Six Conference men's basketball standings
| | Conf. | | | | Overall |
| Team | W | | L | PCT | W | | L | PCT |
|---|---|---|---|---|---|---|---|---|
| Kansas | 8 | – | 2 | .800 | 19 | – | 6 | .760 |
| Missouri | 8 | – | 2 | .800 | 13 | – | 6 | .684 |
| Oklahoma | 8 | – | 2 | .800 | 12 | – | 7 | .632 |
| Iowa State | 2 | – | 8 | .200 | 9 | – | 9 | .500 |
| Kansas State | 2 | – | 8 | .200 | 6 | – | 12 | .333 |
| Nebraska | 2 | – | 8 | .200 | 6 | – | 12 | .333 |

The 1939–40 Kansas Jayhawks men's basketball team represented the University of Kansas during the 1939–40 college men's basketball season. They were coached by Phog Allen. The Jayhawks qualified for the NCAA tournament, which was played for the first time the previous season, for the first time in school history. They would lose to Indiana in the national championship game.

== Roster ==
- Robert Allen
- Donald Ebling
- Howard Engleman
- Richard Harp
- William Hogben
- Thomas Hunter
- Bob Johnson
- John Kline
- Ralph Miller
- Charles Nees
- Jack Sands
- Bruce Voran
- Maurice Jackson

== Schedule ==
| Date time, TV | Rank^{#} | Opponent^{#} | Result | Record | Site city, state |
|---|---|---|---|---|---|
| December 5* | | Oklahoma A&M | W 34–30 | 1-0 | Hoch Auditorium; Lawrence, KS |
| December 8* | | at Warrensburg | L 31–33 | 1-1 | Warrensburg, MO |
| December 18* | | SMU | W 63–31 | 2-1 | Hoch Auditorium; Lawrence, KS |
| December 19* | | SMU | W 37–26 | 3-1 | Hoch Auditoriuim; Lawrence, KS |
| December 28* | | vs. Baker | W 34–18 | 4-1 | Topeka, KS |
| December 29* | | vs. New Mexico Mines | W 40–24 | 5-1 | Topeka, KS |
| December 30* | | at Washburn | W 44–41 | 6-1 | Topeka, KS |
| January 5 | | Oklahoma | W 46–26 | 7-1 (1-0) | Hoch Auditorium; Lawrence, KS |
| January 8* | | at Loyola | W 40–36 | 8-1 | Alumni Gym; Chicago, IL |
| January 12 | | Kansas State; Sunflower Showdown | W 34–33 | 9-1 (2-0) | Hoch Auditorium; Lawrence, KS |
| January 18 | | at Missouri; Border War | L 31–42 | 9-2 (2-1) | Brewer Fieldhouse; Columbia, MO |
| January 23 | | Nebraska | W 40–24 | 10-2 (3-1) | Hoch Auditorium; Lawrence, KS |
| February 10 | | at Kansas State; Sunflower Showdown | W 44–33 | 11-2 (4-1) | Nichols Hall; Manhattan, KS |
| February 12 | | Iowa State | W 36–34 | 12-2 (5-1) | Hoch Auditorium; Lawrence, KS |
| February 15* | | at Oklahoma A&M | L 22–24 | 12-3 | Gallagher-Iba Arena; Stillwater, OK |
| February 24 | | at Nebraska | W 48–41 | 13-3 (6-1) | Nebraska Coliseum; Lincoln, NE |
| February 26 | | at Iowa State | W 42–29 | 14-3 (7-1) | State Gymnasium; Ames, IA |
| March 1 | | Missouri; Border War | W 42–40 | 15-3 (8-1) | Hoch Auditorium; Lawrence, KS |
| March 4* | | at Creighton | L 33–35 | 15-4 | University Gym; Omaha, NE |
| March 8 | | at Oklahoma | L 36–47 | 15-5 (8-2) | Field House; Norman, OK |
| March 12 | | vs. Oklahoma | W 45–39 | 16-5 | Henrion Gymnasium; Wichita, KS |
| March 16* | | vs. Oklahoma State | W 45–43 | 17-5 | Memorial Auditorium; Oklahoma City, OK |
| March 22* | | vs. Rice; NCAA Quarterfinals | W 50–44 | 18-5 | Municipal Auditorium; Kansas City, MO |
| March 23* | | vs. USC; NCAA Semifinals | W 43–42 | 19-5 | Municipal Auditorium; Kansas City, MO |
| March 30* | | vs. Indiana; National Championship game | L 42–60 | 19-6 | Municipal Auditorium; Kansas City, MO |
*Non-conference game. ^{#}Rankings from AP Poll. (#) Tournament seedings in parentheses.
