= 1941 NCAA Men's Basketball All-Americans =

- Awarded for: 1940–41 NCAA men's basketball season

The consensus 1941 College Basketball All-American team, as determined by aggregating the results of four major All-American teams. To earn "consensus" status, a player must win honors from a majority of the following teams: the Helms Athletic Foundation, Converse, and Madison Square Garden.

== 1941 Consensus All-America team ==
Consensus First Team
Player	Class	Team
John Adams	Senior	Arkansas
Gus Broberg	Senior	Dartmouth
Howard Engleman	Senior	Kansas
Gene Englund	Senior	Wisconsin
George Glamack	Senior	North Carolina

Consensus Second Team
Player	Class	Team
Frank Baumholtz	Senior	Ohio
Bob Kinney	Junior	Rice
Paul Lindemann	Senior	Washington State
Stan Modzelewski	Junior	Rhode Island State
Oscar Schectman	Senior	Long Island

== Individual All-America teams ==
All-America Team
All-America Team	First team		Second team		Third team	
All-America Team	Player	School	Player	School	Player	School
Helms	John Adams	Arkansas	No second or third teams			
Helms	Gus Broberg	Dartmouth	No second or third teams			
Helms	Howard Engleman	Kansas	No second or third teams			
Helms	Gene Englund	Wisconsin	No second or third teams			
Helms	George Glamack	North Carolina	No second or third teams			
Helms	Lee Huber	Kentucky	No second or third teams			
Helms	Stan Modzelewski	Rhode Island State	No second or third teams			
Helms	Walt O'Connor	Drake	No second or third teams			
Helms	Milton Phelps	San Diego State	No second or third teams			
Helms	Ray Sundquist	Washington State	No second or third teams			
Converse	Frank Baumholtz	Ohio	John Adams	Arkansas	John Barr	Penn State
Converse	Gus Broberg	Dartmouth	Gene Englund	Wisconsin	Price Brookfield	West Texas State
Converse	Bob Kinney	Rice	George Glamack	North Carolina	Bob Davies	Seton Hall
Converse	Paul Lindemann	Washington State	Thomas Guerrero	UC Santa Barbara	Eddie Riska	Notre Dame
Converse	Oscar Schectman	Long Island	Carlisle Towery	Western Kentucky	Vic Townsend	Oregon
Madison Square Garden	Moe Becker	Duquesne	Howard Engleman	Kansas	No third team	
Madison Square Garden	Frank Carswell	Rice	Elmer Gainer	DePaul	No third team	
Madison Square Garden	Bob Gerber	Toledo	Bruce Hale	Santa Clara	No third team	
Madison Square Garden	Stan Modzelewski	Rhode Island State	Bill Rutledge	Rhode Island State	No third team	
Madison Square Garden	Chips Sobek	Notre Dame	Paul Widowitz	Duquesne	No third team	

== See also ==
- 1940–41 NCAA men's basketball season
