= 1929–30 Iowa State Cyclones men's basketball team =

American college basketball season

1929–30 Iowa State Cyclones men's basketball
- Conference: Big Six Conference
- Record: 9–8 (5–5 Big Six)
- Head coach: Louis Menze (2nd season)
- Home arena: State Gymnasium

1929–30 Big Six Conference men's basketball standings
| | Conf. | | | | Overall |
| Team | W | | L | PCT | W | | L | PCT |
|---|---|---|---|---|---|---|---|---|
| Missouri | 8 | – | 2 | .800 | 15 | – | 3 | .833 |
| Kansas | 7 | – | 3 | .700 | 14 | – | 4 | .778 |
| Nebraska | 6 | – | 4 | .600 | 9 | – | 9 | .500 |
| Iowa State | 5 | – | 5 | .500 | 9 | – | 8 | .529 |
| Kansas State | 4 | – | 6 | .400 | 9 | – | 7 | .563 |
| Oklahoma | 0 | – | 10 | .000 | 6 | – | 12 | .333 |

The 1929–30 Iowa State Cyclones men's basketball team (also known informally as Ames) represented Iowa State University during the 1929–30 NCAA men's basketball season. The Cyclones were coached by Louis Menze, who was in his second season with the Cyclones. They played their home games at the State Gymnasium in Ames, Iowa.

They finished the season 9–8, 5–5 in Big Six play to finish in fourth place.

== Roster ==
1929–30 Iowa State Cyclones men's basketball team
Players
Coaches

| Pos. | # | Name | Height | Weight | Year | Hometown |
|---|---|---|---|---|---|---|
| C | | Breke | — | — |
| G | | Hanks | — | — |
| G | | Dick Hawk | — | — | So | Kansas City, Missouri |
| C | | Albert Heitman | — | — | So | Keystone, Iowa |
| G | | Gilbert Hitch | — | — |
| F | | Herman Holmes | — | — | | Gilbert, Iowa |
| C | | Gordon Nagel | — | — | | Guthrie Center, Iowa |
| G | | J.J. Peters | — | — | | Wellsburg, Iowa |
| | | Max Rieke | — | — | So | Blairstown, Iowa |
| F | | Jack Roadcap | — | — | So | Kansas City, Missouri |
| F | | Dale Weber | — | — | | Dallas Center, Iowa |
| G | | Weller | — | — |
| F | | Glenn Woods (C) | — | — | Sr | Irwin, Iowa |
| G | | Burnett Zimmerman | — | — | | Watertown, South Dakota |

Head coach

- Louis Menze

Assistant coach(es)

Legend

- (C) Team captain
- (S) Suspended
- (I) Ineligible
- (W) Walk-on
- Injured
- Current redshirt

== Schedule and results ==
| Date time, TV | Rank^{#} | Opponent^{#} | Result | Record | Site city, state |
Regular season
| December 17, 1929* | | at Simpson | W 28–12 | 1–0 | Indianola, Iowa |
| December 20, 1929* | | Simpson | W 22–18 | 2–0 | State Gymnasium; Ames, Iowa |
| December 28, 1929* | | at Central | W 41–39 | 3–0 | Pella, Iowa |
| December 31, 1929* | | at Wisconsin | L 17–34 | 3–1 | Red Gym; Madison, Wisconsin |
| January 3, 1930* | | Drake; Iowa Big Four | W 38–15 | 4–1 | State Gymnasium; Ames, Iowa |
| January 10, 1930 | | Missouri | L 24–31 | 4–2 (0–1) | State Gymnasium; Ames, Iowa |
| January 17, 1930 | | at Kansas | L 16–37 | 4–3 (0–2) | Hoch Auditorium; Lawrence, Kansas |
| January 18, 1930 | | at Oklahoma | W 34–33 | 5–3 (1–2) | OU Field House; Norman, Oklahoma |
| January 22, 1930 | | Nebraska | L 22–32 | 5–4 (1–3) | State Gymnasium; Ames, Iowa |
| January 25, 1930* | | at Creighton | L 34–40 | 5–5 | University Gym; Omaha, Nebraska |
| January 31, 1930 | | Kansas State | W 37–21 | 6–5 (2–3) | State Gymnasium; Ames, Iowa |
| February 8, 1930 | | Missouri | L 34–43 | 6–6 (2–4) | Brewer Fieldhouse; Columbia, Missouri |
| February 12, 1930*; 7:30 pm | | at Drake; Iowa Big Four | L 22–30 | 6–7 | Drake Fieldhouse; Des Moines, Iowa |
| February 17, 1930 | | Oklahoma | W 39–23 | 7–7 (3–4) | State Gymnasium; Ames, Iowa |
| February 21, 1930 | | at Kansas State | W 25–24 | 8–7 (4–4) | Nichols Hall; Manhattan, Kansas |
| February 22, 1930 | | at Nebraska | L 50–52 | 8–8 (4–5) | Nebraska Coliseum; Lincoln, Nebraska |
| February 27, 1930 | | Kansas | W 30–27 | 9–8 (5–5) | State Gymnasium; Ames, Iowa |
*Non-conference game. ^{#}Rankings from AP poll. (#) Tournament seedings in parentheses. All times are in Central Time.
