= 1940–41 Iowa State Cyclones men's basketball team =

American college basketball season

1940–41 Iowa State Cyclones men's basketball

Big Six Regular season Champion

Fifth District NCAA Qualifying Game
- Conference: Big Six Conference
- Record: 15–4 (7–3 Big Six)
- Head coach: Louis Menze (13th season)
- Home arena: State Gymnasium

The 1940–41 Iowa State Cyclones men's basketball team represented Iowa State College in the 1940–41 college basketball season. The team was led by 13th-year head coach Louis Menze. In 1939–40, the Cyclones finished 9–9 overall (2–8 in the Big Six Conference). The team's captains were Al Budolfson and Gordon Nicholas. The Cyclones shared the Big Six conference championship with the Kansas Jayhawks. This was the first time that Iowa State had ever qualified for the postseason. They faced Creighton in a district qualifying game for the 1941 NCAA Tournament, where they fell, 57–48.

1940–41 Big Six Conference men's basketball standings
	Conf.				Overall
Team	W		L	PCT	W		L	PCT
Iowa State	7	–	3	.700	15	–	4	.789
Kansas	7	–	3	.700	12	–	6	.667
Nebraska	6	–	4	.600	8	–	10	.444
Oklahoma	5	–	5	.500	6	–	12	.333
Kansas State	3	–	7	.300	6	–	12	.333
Missouri	2	–	8	.200	6	–	10	.375

== Roster ==
1940–41 Iowa State Cyclones men's basketball team
Players
Coaches

Pos.	#	Name	Height	Weight	Year	Hometown
F		Al Budolfson (C)	—	—	Jr	Rolfe, Iowa
G		Dale DeKoster	—	—	Sr	Spencer, Iowa
F		Jerry Deneckere	—	—		Rock Island, Illinois
		Fred Gordon	—	—		Decorah, Iowa
C		Gordon Nicholas (C)	—	—	Sr	Lawton, Iowa
G		Grover Miehe	—	—		Maynard, Iowa
G		Larry Owens	—	—		Ames, Iowa
F		Carol Schneider	6 ft 6 in (1.98 m)	—	Jr	Rock Island, Illinois
F		Ed Smith	6 ft 1 in (1.85 m)	—	So	Minburn, Iowa
F		Leon Uknes	—	—		Sioux City, Iowa

Head coach

- Louis Menze

Assistant coach(es)

Legend

- (C) Team captain
- (S) Suspended
- (I) Ineligible
- (W) Walk-on
- Injured
- Current redshirt

== Player stats ==
Note: PPG = points per game

Player	Class	Pos	PPG
Gordon Nicholas	Sr	C	9.7
Al Budolfson	Jr	F	8.1
Dale DeKoster	Sr	G	7.3
Carol Schneider	Jr	G	7.0

== Schedule ==
Date time, TV	Rank^{#}	Opponent^{#}	Result	Record	Site city, state
Regular season
December 4, 1940*; 7:15 pm		Cornell	W 37–22	1–0	State Gymnasium; Ames, Iowa
December 7, 1940*		Coe	W 28–23	2–0	State Gymnasium; Ames, Iowa
December 9, 1940*		at Minnesota	W 37–36	3–0	Williams Arena; Minneapolis, Minnesota
December 14, 1940*		at Bradley Tech	W 31–28	4–0	Peoria Armory; Peoria, Illinois
December 21, 1940*		Grinnell	W 43–37	5–0	State Gymnasium; Ames, Iowa
December 31, 1940*		Drake; Iowa Big Four	W 45–26	6–0	State Gymnasium; Ames, Iowa
January 4, 1941*; 8:15 pm		at Drake; Iowa Big Four	W 36–30	7–0	Drake Fieldhouse; Des Moines, Iowa
January 6, 1941*; 7:15 pm		Montana	W 41–27	8–0	State Gymnasium; Ames, Iowa
January 13, 1941		at Kansas	L 41–44	8–1 (0–1)	Hoch Auditorium; Lawrence, Kansas
January 18, 1941		Missouri	W 40–37	9–1 (1–1)	State Gymnasium; Ames, Iowa
January 25, 1941; 7:30 pm		Nebraska	L 35–38	9–2 (1–2)	State Gymnasium; Ames, Iowa
February 1, 1941		at Nebraska	L 36–41	9–3 (1–3)	Nebraska Coliseum; Lincoln, Nebraska
February 8, 1941		at Oklahoma	W 35–33	10–3 (2–3)	OU Field House; Norman, Oklahoma
February 10, 1941		at Kansas State	W 50–41	11–3 (3–3)	Nichols Hall; Manhattan, Kansas
February 17, 1941		Oklahoma	W 44–30	12–3 (4–3)	State Gymnasium; Ames, Iowa
February 24, 1941		at Missouri	W 49–29	13–3 (5–3)	Brewer Fieldhouse; Columbia, Missouri
March 1, 1941		Kansas State	W 36–33	14–3 (6–3)	State Gymnasium; Ames, Iowa
March 3, 1941		Kansas	W 41–29	15–3 (7–3)	State Gymnasium; Ames, Iowa
Postseason
March 18, 1941*; 9:00 pm		vs. Creighton; Fifth District NCAA Qualifying Game	L 48–57	15–4	Municipal Auditorium; Kansas City, Missouri
*Non-conference game. ^{#}Rankings from AP poll. (#) Tournament seedings in parentheses. All times are in Central Time.
