= 1939–40 Wisconsin Badgers men's basketball team =

American college basketball season

1939–40 Wisconsin Badgers men's basketball
- Conference: Big Ten Conference
- Record: 5–15 (3–9 Big Ten)
- Head coach: Harold E. Foster
- Home arena: UW Fieldhouse

1939–40 Big Ten Conference men's basketball standings
	Conf.				Overall
Team	W		L	PCT	W		L	PCT
Purdue	10	–	2	.833	16	–	4	.800
Indiana	9	–	3	.750	20	–	3	.870
Ohio State	8	–	4	.667	13	–	7	.650
Illinois	7	–	5	.583	14	–	6	.700
Northwestern	7	–	5	.583	13	–	7	.650
Michigan	6	–	6	.500	13	–	7	.650
Minnesota	5	–	7	.417	12	–	8	.600
Iowa	4	–	8	.333	9	–	12	.429
Wisconsin	3	–	9	.250	5	–	15	.250
Chicago	1	–	11	.083	5	–	15	.250

The 1939–40 Wisconsin Badgers men's basketball team represented University of Wisconsin–Madison. The head coach was Harold E. Foster, coaching his sixth season with the Badgers. The team played their home games at the UW Fieldhouse in Madison, Wisconsin and was a member of the Big Ten Conference.

== Schedule ==
Date time, TV	Rank^{#}	Opponent^{#}	Result	Record	Site city, state
Regular Season
12/04/1939*		Carleton (MN)	W 37–19	1–0	UW Fieldhouse; Madison, Wisconsin
12/09/1939*		Marquette	W 46–39	2–0	UW Fieldhouse; Madison, Wisconsin
12/12/1939*		at Notre Dame	L 33–51	2–1	Notre Dame Fieldhouse; Notre Dame, Indiana
12/16/1939*		at Marquette	L 28–41	2–2	Marquette Gymnasium; Milwaukee
12/30/1939*		vs. Nebraska	L 43–53	2–3	Marquette Gymnasium; Milwaukee
1/02/1940*		Stanford	L 26–39	2–4	UW Fieldhouse; Madison, Wisconsin
1/06/1940		at Chicago	W 20–18	3–4 (1–0)	Henry Crown Field House; Chicago
1/08/1940		Michigan	L 39–44	3–5 (1–1)	UW Fieldhouse; Madison, Wisconsin
1/13/1940		at Purdue	L 36–49	3–6 (1–2)	Lambert Fieldhouse; West Lafayette, Indiana
1/15/1940		Indiana	L 34–40	3–7 (1–3)	UW Fieldhouse; Madison, Wisconsin
2/03/1940*		at Michigan State	L 41–48	3–8	Jenison Fieldhouse; East Lansing, Michigan
2/05/1940*		Butler	L 46–50	3–9	UW Fieldhouse; Madison, Wisconsin
2/10/1940		at Iowa	L 35–37	3–10 (1–4)	Iowa Field House; Iowa City, IA
2/12/1940		Minnesota	W 36–34	4–10 (2–4)	UW Fieldhouse; Madison, Wisconsin
2/17/1940		at Ohio State	L 35–41	4–11 (2–5)	Ohio Expo Center Coliseum; Columbus, Ohio
2/19/1940		at Illinois	L 35–37	4–12 (2–6)	Huff Hall; Champaign, Illinois
2/24/1940		Purdue	L 45–48 ^{OT}	4–13 (2–7)	UW Fieldhouse; Madison, Wisconsin
2/26/1940		at Minnesota	L 39–44	4–14 (2–8)	Minnesota Field House; Minneapolis
3/02/1940		Northwestern	L 44–47	4–15 (2–9)	UW Fieldhouse; Madison, Wisconsin
3/04/1940		Chicago	W 46–31	5–15 (3–9)	UW Fieldhouse; Madison, Wisconsin
*Non-conference game. ^{#}Rankings from AP Poll. (#) Tournament seedings in parentheses.
