= Louis Menze =

Biographical details
- Born: June 28, 1894; Nebraska, U.S.
- Died: October 7, 1982 (aged 88); Ames, Iowa, U.S.

Coaching career (HC unless noted)
- 1928–1947: Iowa State

Administrative career (AD unless noted)
- 1945–1958: Iowa State

Head coaching record
- Overall: 166–153
- Tournaments: 1–1 (NCAA)

Accomplishments and honors

Championships
- NCAA Final Four (1944); 4 Big Six regular season (1935, 1941, 1944, 1945)

Louis Edmond Menze (June 28, 1894 – October 7, 1982) was a college men's basketball coach and athletics administrator.

== Professional career ==
He was the head coach of Iowa State from 1928 to 1947. He coached Iowa State to a 166–153 record, winning four Big Six Conference championships and made the 1944 Final Four in one NCAA tournament appearance.

He also served as Iowa State's athletic director from 1945 to 1958. He was inducted into the Iowa State athletics Hall of Fame in 1998.

== Head coaching record ==
Record table
Season	Team	Overall	Conference	Standing	Postseason
Iowa State Cyclones (Big Six Conference) (1928–1947)
1928–29	Iowa State	8–7	4–6	4th	
1929–30	Iowa State	9–8	5–5	4th	
1930–31	Iowa State	8–8	4–6	5th	
1931–32	Iowa State	9–6	4–6	5th	
1932–33	Iowa State	6–10	2–8	6th	
1933–34	Iowa State	6–11	2–8	T–5th	
1934–35	Iowa State	13–3	8–2	1st	
1935–36	Iowa State	8–8	3–7	T–4th	
1936–37	Iowa State	3–15	0–10	6th	
1937–38	Iowa State	6–9	2–8	6th	
1938–39	Iowa State	8–9	5–5	4th	
1939–40	Iowa State	9–9	2–8	T–4th	
1940–41	Iowa State	15–4	7–3	T–1st	
1941–42	Iowa State	11–6	5–5	3rd	
1942–43	Iowa State	7–9	2–8	5th	
1943–44	Iowa State	14–4	9–1	T–1st	NCAA Final Four
1944–45	Iowa State	11–5	8–2	1st	
1945–46	Iowa State	8–8	5–5	3rd	
1946–47	Iowa State	7–14	5–5	T–3rd	
Iowa State:		166–153 (.520)	82–108 (.432)		
Total:		166–153 (.520)			
National champion Postseason invitational champion Conference regular season champion Conference regular season and conference tournament champion Division regular season champion Division regular season and conference tournament champion Conference tournament champion

== See also ==
- List of NCAA Division I Men's Final Four appearances by coach
