= Bob Gerber =

American basketball player (1916-2002)

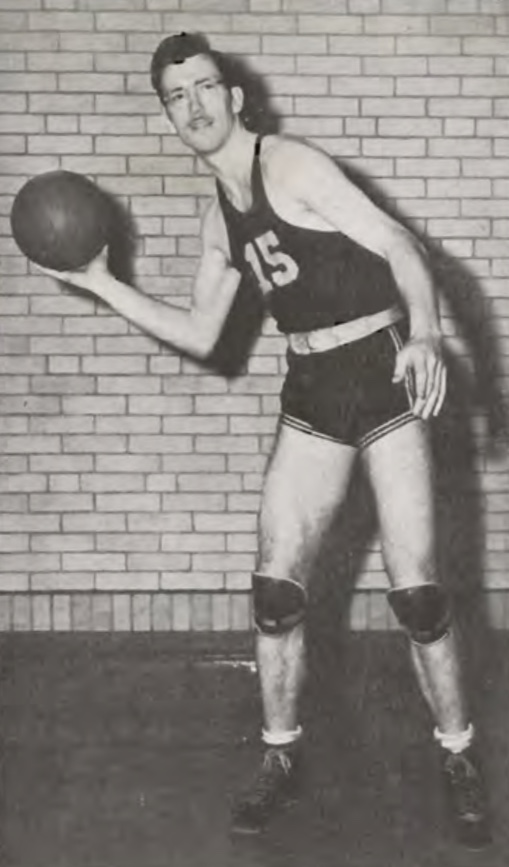
- Gerber from the 1942 Blockhouse

Personal information
- Born: August 1, 1916 Akron, Ohio, U.S.
- Died: February 13, 2002 (aged 85) Sandusky, Ohio, U.S.
- Listed height: 6 ft 4 in (1.93 m)
- Listed weight: 190 lb (86 kg)

Career information
- High school: West (Akron, Ohio)
- College: Toledo (1939–1942)
- Playing career: 1942–1948
- Position: Forward / center

Career history
- 1942: Toledo Jim White Chevrolets
- 1945–1946: Indianapolis Kautskys
- 1946–1947: Toledo Jeeps
- 1947: Minneapolis Lakers
- 1948: Tri-Cities BlackHawks

Career highlights
- First-team All-American – MSG (1941); Second-team All-American – Converse, Pic (1942)

Robert E. Gerber (August 1, 1916 – February 13, 2002) was an American basketball player. He played in the National Basketball League (an NBA predecessor) for four seasons following an All-American college career at the University of Toledo.

Gerber came to Toledo after a somewhat undistinguished high school career in Akron, Ohio. The 6'4 center/forward never lettered until his senior year at Akron South High School. However, he came into his own in college. He earned All-American honors in 1941 and 1942 and as a senior became the all-time collegiate scoring leader for the state of Ohio and broke the national college single-season scoring record with 532 points (both marks since eclipsed).

Following the close of his college career, Gerber played briefly with the Toledo Jim White Chevrolets of the NBL before joining the U.S. Army for World War II. Upon his return home, Gerber restarted his professional basketball career, playing three more seasons with the Indianapolis Kautskys, Toledo Jeeps, Minneapolis Lakers and Tri-Cities BlackHawks. He averaged 6.8 points in 93 NBL games.

After his professional career was over, Gerber settled into private life in Toledo, Ohio. He died of heart failure on February 13, 2002, in Sandusky, Ohio.
