= 1937–38 Kansas Jayhawks men's basketball team =

American college basketball season

1937–38 Kansas Jayhawks men's basketball

Big Six Champions
- Conference: Big Six Conference
- Record: 18–2 (9–1 Big 6)
- Head coach: Phog Allen (21st season)
- Captain: Fred Pralle
- Home arena: Hoch Auditorium

1937–38 Big Six Conference men's basketball standings
	Conf.				Overall
Team	W		L	PCT	W		L	PCT
Kansas	9	–	1	.900	18	–	2	.900
Oklahoma	8	–	2	.800	14	–	4	.778
Missouri	4	–	6	.400	9	–	9	.500
Nebraska	4	–	6	.400	9	–	11	.450
Kansas State	3	–	7	.300	7	–	11	.389
Iowa State	2	–	8	.200	6	–	9	.400

The 1937–38 Kansas Jayhawks men's basketball team represented the University of Kansas during the 1937–38 college men's basketball season.

== Roster ==
- Lyman Corlis
- Fenlon Durand
- Donald Ebling
- Loren Florell
- George Golay
- Richard Harp
- Robert Hunt
- Carl Johnson
- Lester Kappelman
- Charles Nees
- Kirk Owen
- Fred Pralle
- Bruce Reid
- Sylvester Schmidt
- Nelson Sullivan
- Edwin Wienecke

== Schedule ==
Date time, TV	Rank^{#}	Opponent^{#}	Result	Record	Site city, state
December 6*		Doane	W 38–23	1-0	Hoch Auditorium; Lawrence, KS
December 7*		Ottawa	W 36–17	2-0	Hoch Auditorium; Lawrence, KS
December 10*		at Ottawa	W 41–35	3-0	Wilson Field House; Ottawa, KS
December 13*		Baker	W 41–27	4-0	Hoch Auditorium; Lawrence, KS
December 14*		Southwestern (KS)	W 39–29	5-0	Hoch Auditorium; Lawrence, KS
December 15*		at Washburn	W 31–15	6-0	Topeka, KS
December 15*		Morningside	W 26–21	7-0	Hoch Auditorium; Lawrence, KS
December 21*		at Southwestern (KS)	W 28–24	8-0	Stewart Field House; Winfield, KS
December 29*		at Drake	L 29–34	8-1	Drake Fieldhouse; Des Moines, IA
January 4*		Washburn	W 62–33	9-1	Hoch Auditorium; Lawrence, KS
January 7		Oklahoma	L 46–49	9-2 (0-1)	Hoch Auditorium; Lawrence, KS
January 11		at Kansas State; Sunflower Showdown	W 33–21	10-2 (1-1)	Nichols Hall; Manhattan, KS
January 15		Iowa State	W 31–17	11-2 (2-1)	Hoch Auditorium; Lawrence, KS
January 19		at Missouri; Border War	W 37–32	12-2 (3-1)	Brewer Fieldhouse; Columbia, MO
February 2		Nebraska	W 48–33	13-2 (4-1)	Hoch Auditorium; Lawrence, KS
February 7		Kansas State	W 35–33	14-2 (5-1)	Hoch Auditorium; Lawrence, KS
February 18		at Oklahoma	W 41–38	15-2 (6-1)	Field House; Norman, OK
February 21		at Iowa State	W 31–23	16-2 (7-1)	State Gymnasium; Ames, IA
February 26		at Nebraska	W 50–47	17-2 (8-1)	Nebraska Coliseum; Lincoln, NE
March 3		Missouri; Border War	W 56–36	18-2 (9-1)	Hoch Auditorium; Lawrence, KS
*Non-conference game. ^{#}Rankings from AP Poll. (#) Tournament seedings in parentheses.
