= 1929–30 Kansas Jayhawks men's basketball team =

American college basketball season

1929–30 Kansas Jayhawks men's basketball
- Conference: Big Six Conference
- Record: 14–4 (7–3 Big 6)
- Head coach: Phog Allen (13th season)
- Assistant coach: John Bunn (9th season)
- Captain: Russell Thomson
- Home arena: Hoch Auditorium

1929–30 Big Six Conference men's basketball standings
	Conf.				Overall
Team	W		L	PCT	W		L	PCT
Missouri	8	–	2	.800	15	–	3	.833
Kansas	7	–	3	.700	14	–	4	.778
Nebraska	6	–	4	.600	9	–	9	.500
Iowa State	5	–	5	.500	9	–	8	.529
Kansas State	4	–	6	.400	9	–	7	.563
Oklahoma	0	–	10	.000	6	–	12	.333

The 1929–30 Kansas Jayhawks men's basketball team represented the University of Kansas during the 1929–30 college men's basketball season.

== Roster ==
- Frank Bausch
- Jim Bausch
- Tom Bishop
- Forrest Cox
- Theodore O'Leary
- Leland Page
- Floyd Ramsey
- Russell Thomson
- Bruce Voran

== Schedule ==
Date time, TV	Rank^{#}	Opponent^{#}	Result	Record	Site city, state
December 17*		at Washburn	W 42–22	1-0	Topeka, KS
December 21		vs. Missouri; Border War	W 17–12	2-0	Convention Hall; Kansas City, MO
January 2*		vs. California	W 36–25	3-0	Convention Hall; Kansas City, MO
January 3*		vs. California	W 31–15	4-0	Convention Hall; Kansas City, MO
January 4*		California	W 38–28	5-0	Hoch Auditorium; Lawrence, KS
January 6*		Mexico (Nationals)	W 39–30	6-0	Hoch Auditorium; Lawrence, KS
January 11		at Oklahoma	W 34–22	7-0 (1-0)	Field House; Norman, OK
January 13*		at Oklahoma A&M	W 44–20	8-0	Armory Gymnasium; Stillwater, OK
January 17		Iowa State	W 37–16	9-0 (2-0)	Hoch Auditorium; Lawrence, KS
February 5		at Kansas State; Sunflower Showdown	W 29–26	10-0 (3-0)	Nichols Hall; Manhattan, KS
February 10		Nebraska	W 27–20	11-0 (4-0)	Hoch Auditorium; Lawrence, KS
February 15		Oklahoma	W 25–23	12-0 (5-0)	Hoch Auditorium; Lawrence, KS
February 18		Kansas State; Sunflower Showdown	W 33–30	13-0 (6-0)	Hoch Auditorium; Lawrence, KS
February 21		at Missouri; Border War	L 18–29	13-1 (6-1)	Brewer Fieldhouse; Columbia, MO
February 27		at Iowa State	L 27–30	13-2 (6-2)	State Gymnasium; Ames, IA
February 28*		at Creighton	L 20–44	13-3	University Gymnasium; Omaha, Nebraska
March 1		at Nebraska	W 36–35	14-3 (7-2)	Nebraska Coliseum; Lincoln, NE
March 5		Missouri; Border War	L 18–23	14-4 (7-3)	Hoch Auditorium; Lawrence, KS
*Non-conference game. ^{#}Rankings from AP Poll. (#) Tournament seedings in parentheses.
