= Chet Francis =

American basketball player

Personal information
- Born: May 1, 1918 Avon, Indiana, U.S.
- Died: January 23, 2002 (aged 83) Vincennes, Indiana, U.S.
- Listed height: 6 ft 2 in (1.88 m)
- Listed weight: 180 lb (82 kg)

Career information
- High school: Avon (Avon, Indiana)
- College: Indiana (1938–1941)
- Position: Forward

Career history

Playing
- 1946: Indianapolis Kautskys

Coaching
- 1946–1957: Lincoln HS

Career highlights
- NCAA champion (1940)

Chester Eugene Francis (May 1, 1918 – January 23, 2002) was an American professional basketball player. He played in the National Basketball League for the Indianapolis Kautskys in three games during the 1945–46 season and averaged 0.7 points per game. He coached high school basketball and ran his own insurance company after his playing career.
