= 1939–40 Michigan Wolverines men's basketball team =

American college basketball season

1939–40 Michigan Wolverines men's basketball
- Conference: Big Ten Conference
- Record: 13–7 (6–6 Big Ten)
- Head coach: Bennie Oosterbaan
- Captain: James Rae
- Home arena: Yost Field House

1939–40 Big Ten Conference men's basketball standings
	Conf.				Overall
Team	W		L	PCT	W		L	PCT
Purdue	10	–	2	.833	16	–	4	.800
Indiana	9	–	3	.750	20	–	3	.870
Ohio State	8	–	4	.667	13	–	7	.650
Illinois	7	–	5	.583	14	–	6	.700
Northwestern	7	–	5	.583	13	–	7	.650
Michigan	6	–	6	.500	13	–	7	.650
Minnesota	5	–	7	.417	12	–	8	.600
Iowa	4	–	8	.333	9	–	12	.429
Wisconsin	3	–	9	.250	5	–	15	.250
Chicago	1	–	11	.083	5	–	15	.250

The 1939–40 Michigan Wolverines men's basketball team represented the University of Michigan in intercollegiate basketball during the 1939–40 season. The team finished the season in sixth place in the Big Ten Conference with an overall record of 13–7 and 6–6 against conference opponents.

Bennie Oosterbaan was in his first year as the team's head coach. James Rae was the team's leading scorer with 199 points in 20 games for an average of 10.0 points per game. Rae was also the team captain.

== Statistical leaders ==
Player	Pos.	Yr	G	FG	FT	RB	Pts	PPG
James Rae			20	77	45-60		199	10.0
Charles Pink			20	60	34-51		154	7.7
Michael Sofiak			20	40	34-69		114	5.7
Herbert Brogan			20	47	15-37		109	5.5
George Ruehle			14	32	9-16		51	3.6
Wayne Fitzgerald			19	19	7-18		45	2.4
Totals			20	295	161-287		751	37.6
