= 1939–40 Iowa State Cyclones men's basketball team =

American college basketball season

1939–40 Iowa State Cyclones men's basketball
- Conference: Big Six Conference
- Record: 9–9 (2–8 Big Six)
- Head coach: Louis Menze (12th season)
- Home arena: State Gymnasium

1939–40 Big Six Conference men's basketball standings
	Conf.				Overall
Team	W		L	PCT	W		L	PCT
Kansas	8	–	2	.800	19	–	6	.760
Missouri	8	–	2	.800	13	–	6	.684
Oklahoma	8	–	2	.800	12	–	7	.632
Iowa State	2	–	8	.200	9	–	9	.500
Kansas State	2	–	8	.200	6	–	12	.333
Nebraska	2	–	8	.200	6	–	12	.333

The 1939–40 Iowa State Cyclones men's basketball team represented Iowa State University during the 1939–40 NCAA men's basketball season. The Cyclones were coached by Louis Menze, who was in his twelfth season with the Cyclones. They played their home games at the State Gymnasium in Ames, Iowa.

They finished the season 9–9, 2–8 in Big Six play to finish in a tie for fourth place.

== Roster ==
1939–40 Iowa State Cyclones men's basketball team
Players
Coaches

Pos.	#	Name	Height	Weight	Year	Hometown
G		George Baker	—	—	So
F		Don Beresford	—	—
F		Al Budolfson	—	—	So	Rolfe, Iowa
G		Dale DeKoster	—	—		Spencer, Iowa
F		Darrell Don Carlos	—	—
		Fred Gordon	—	—		Decorah, Iowa
F		Bob Harris	—	—
F		Gene Lang	—	—		Sac City, Iowa
G		Bob Menze (C)	5 ft 7 in (1.7 m)	130 lb (59 kg)	Sr
C		Gordon Nicholas (C)	—	—	Jr	Lawton, Iowa
G		Ed Petoskey	—	—		Burlington, Iowa
C		Carol Schneider	6 ft 6 in (1.98 m)	—	So	Rock Island, Illinois
G		Jerry Speers	—	—
C		Ed Smith	—	—	So	Minburn, Iowa

Head coach

- Louis Menze

Assistant coach(es)

Legend

- (C) Team captain
- (S) Suspended
- (I) Ineligible
- (W) Walk-on
- Injured
- Current redshirt

== Schedule and results ==
Date time, TV	Rank^{#}	Opponent^{#}	Result	Record	Site city, state
Regular season
December 1, 1939*		Simpson	W 67–40	1–0	State Gymnasium; Ames, Iowa
December 4, 1939*		at Morningside	W 57–34	2–0	Sioux City, Iowa
December 8, 1939*		Grinnell	W 50–34	3–0	State Gymnasium; Ames, Iowa
December 11, 1939*; 8:15 pm		at Drake; Iowa Big Four	W 37–34	4–0	Drake Fieldhouse; Des Moines, Iowa
December 13, 1939*		Denver	W 55–46	5–0	State Gymnasium; Ames, Iowa
December 30, 1939*; 7:30 pm		Drake; Iowa Big Four	L 29–33	5–1	State Gymnasium; Ames, Iowa
January 6, 1940*		at Creighton	W 35–32	6–1	University Gym; Omaha, Nebraska
January 8, 1940		at Nebraska	L 28–44	6–2 (0–1)	Nebraska Coliseum; Lincoln, Nebraska
January 15, 1940		Missouri	L 16–27	6–3 (0–2)	State Gymnasium; Ames, Iowa
January 20, 1940		at Oklahoma	L 32–54	6–4 (0–3)	OU Field House; Norman, Oklahoma
January 22, 1940		at Kansas State	L 28–29	6–5 (0–4)	Nichols Hall; Manhattan, Kansas
January 29, 1940*		Morningside	W 58–36	7–5	State Gymnasium; Ames, Iowa
February 9, 1940; 7:30 pm		Kansas State	W 45–32	8–5 (1–4)	State Gymnasium; Ames, Iowa
February 12, 1940		at Kansas	L 34–36	8–6 (1–5)	Hoch Auditorium; Lawrence, Kansas
February 17, 1940		Nebraska	W 40–33	9–6 (2–5)	State Gymnasium; Ames, Iowa
February 22, 1940		Missouri	L 40–63	9–7 (2–6)	State Gymnasium; Ames, Iowa
February 26, 1940		Kansas	L 29–42	9–8 (2–7)	State Gymnasium; Ames, Iowa
March 2, 1940		Oklahoma	L 41–52	9–9 (2–8)	State Gymnasium; Ames, Iowa
*Non-conference game. ^{#}Rankings from AP poll. (#) Tournament seedings in parentheses. All times are in Central Time.
