= 1923 Springfield Red and White football team =

American college football season

1923 Springfield Red and White football
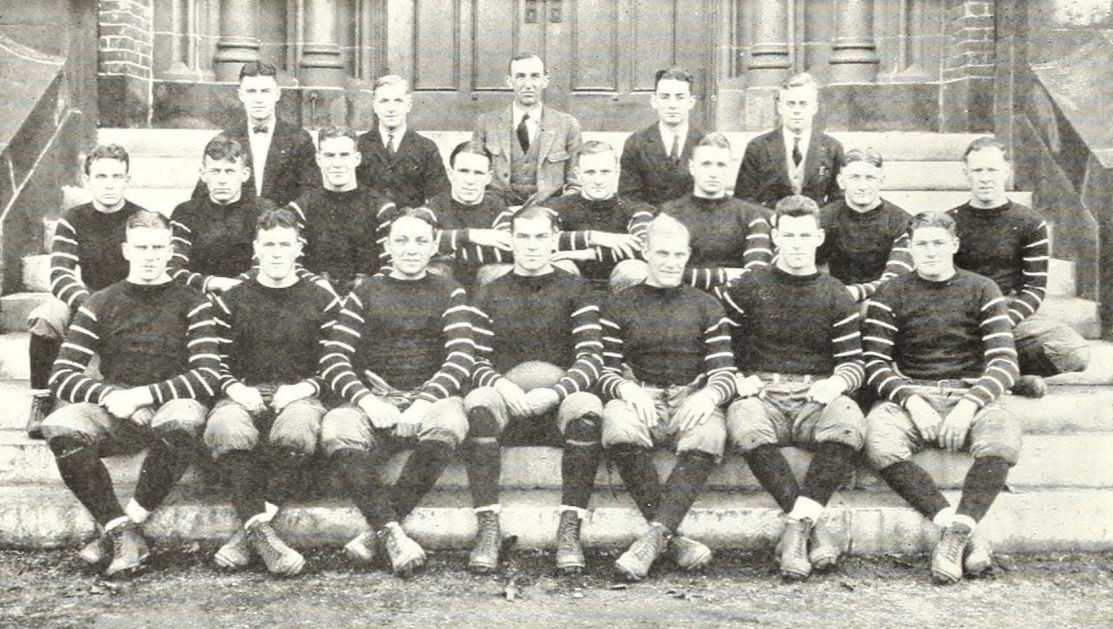
- Conference: Independent
- Record: 0–7
- Head coach: Edward J. Hickox (2nd season)
- Captain: Warren W. Watters
- Home stadium: Pratt Field

1923 Eastern college football independents records
	Conf.			Overall
Team	W	L	T	W		L		T
Cornell		–		8	–	0	–	0
Yale		–		8	–	0	–	0
St. John's		–		5	–	0	–	1
Dartmouth		–		8	–	1	–	0
Syracuse		–		8	–	1	–	0
Boston College		–		7	–	1	–	1
Rutgers		–		7	–	1	–	1
Washington & Jefferson		–		6	–	1	–	1
Holy Cross		–		8	–	2	–	0
Lafayette		–		6	–	1	–	2
Tufts		–		6	–	2	–	0
Army		–		6	–	2	–	1
Colgate		–		6	–	2	–	1
Geneva		–		6	–	2	–	1
Lehigh		–		6	–	2	–	1
NYU		–		6	–	2	–	1
Penn State		–		6	–	2	–	1
Vermont		–		6	–	3	–	1
Brown		–		6	–	4	–	0
Harvard		–		4	–	3	–	1
Carnegie Tech		–		4	–	3	–	1
Penn		–		5	–	4	–	0
Pittsburgh		–		5	–	4	–	0
Bucknell		–		4	–	4	–	1
Columbia		–		4	–	4	–	1
Duquesne		–		4	–	4	–	0
Princeton		–		3	–	3	–	1
Franklin & Marshall		–		3	–	5	–	1
Drexel		–		2	–	6	–	0
Buffalo		–		2	–	5	–	1
Fordham		–		2	–	7	–	0
Boston University		–		1	–	6	–	0
Villanova		–		0	–	7	–	1
Temple		–		0	–	5	–	0
CCNY		–		0	–	7	–	0
Springfield		–		0	–	7	–	0

The 1923 Springfield Red and White football team was an American football team that represented Springfield College as an independent during the 1923 college football season. Led by Edward J. Hickox in his second and final season as head coach, Springfield compiled a record of 0–7. Warren W. Watters the team's captain. Springfield played home games at Pratt Field in Springfield, Massachusetts.

== Schedule ==
Date	Opponent	Site	Result	Source
October 6	Vermont	Pratt Field; Springfield, MA	L 7–26	
October 12	Colby	Pratt Field; Springfield, MA	L 0–9	
October 20	at Lafayette	March Field; Easton, PA	L 0–21	
October 27	at Syracuse	Archbold Stadium; Syracuse, NY	L 0–44	
November 3	at St. John's	Ebbets Field; Brooklyn, NY	L 7–20	
November 10	Lebanon Valley	Pratt Field; Springfield, MA	L 2–7	
November 17	at Holy Cross	Fitton Field; Worcester, MA	L 0–40	
