= 1939–40 Illinois Fighting Illini men's basketball team =

American college basketball season

1939–40 Illinois Fighting Illini men's basketball
- Conference: Big Ten Conference
- Record: 14–6 (7–5 Big Ten)
- Head coach: Douglas Mills (4th season)
- Assistant coaches: Howie Braun (3rd season); Wally Roettger (5th season); Ralph Fletcher (1st season)
- Captain: William Hapac
- Home arena: Huff Hall

1939–40 Big Ten Conference men's basketball standings
	Conf.				Overall
Team	W		L	PCT	W		L	PCT
Purdue	10	–	2	.833	16	–	4	.800
Indiana	9	–	3	.750	20	–	3	.870
Ohio State	8	–	4	.667	13	–	7	.650
Illinois	7	–	5	.583	14	–	6	.700
Northwestern	7	–	5	.583	13	–	7	.650
Michigan	6	–	6	.500	13	–	7	.650
Minnesota	5	–	7	.417	12	–	8	.600
Iowa	4	–	8	.333	9	–	12	.429
Wisconsin	3	–	9	.250	5	–	15	.250
Chicago	1	–	11	.083	5	–	15	.250

The 1939–40 Illinois Fighting Illini men's basketball team represented the University of Illinois.

== Regular season ==
Doug Mills entered his fourth year as the head coach of the Fighting Illini with high hopes as well as a player with national prominence. William "Bill" Hapac was the program's first consensus first-team All-American as recognized by the NCAA. During the 1939–40 season, he became the first-ever recipient of the University of Illinois Athlete of the Year award. Hapac set the Big Ten single-game scoring record on February 10, 1940, with 34 points vs. Minnesota, a point total unheard of at that time. In addition to his success on the hardwood, Hapac also was a three-year letterwinner for the Illini baseball team. During the season, the Illini won 10 of their 11 home games only losing to conference rival Purdue in the last game of the season. Unfortunately for the Illini they finished with a 4–5 record on the road to finish in a fourth place tie overall in conference action. Mills' team featured 9 returning letterman including team captain William Hapac. The Illini also featured a starting lineup of John Drish at the center position and Harold Shapiro, Joe Frank, and William Hapac at forward and Victor Wukovits and future major league baseball player Walter Evers at the guard spot.

=== Roster ===
1939–40 Illinois Fighting Illini men's basketball team
Players
Coaches

Pos.	#	Name	Height	Weight	Year	Hometown
G	3	Colin Handlon	—	—	Sr	Connersville, Indiana
G	4	Henry Sachs	—	—	So	Chicago, Illinois
F	5	Walter Evers	—	—	So	Collinsville, Illinois
C	6	Robert O'Neill	—	—	Jr	Pitman, New Jersey
G	8	Harry Lasater	—	—	Jr	Fairfield, Illinois
C	9	J. Frederick Townshend	—	—	So
F	10	Norman Cusick	—	—	So	Chicago Heights, Illinois
G	12	Robert Richmond	—	—	Jr	Johnston City, Illinois
C	13	Victor Wukovits	—	—	So	Mishawaka, Indiana
G	14	Howard Cronk	—	—	Jr	Anderson, Indiana
F	15	Rex Sherman	—	—	So	Pekin, Illinois
G	16	William Hocking	—	—	So	Evanston, Illinois
F	17	Joe Frank	—	—	Sr	Urbana, Illinois
G	18	Kenneth Brown	—	—	Fr	Catlin, Illinois
F	19	William Hapac (C)	—	—	Sr	Cicero, Illinois
G	20	Harold Shapiro	—	—	Jr	Chicago, Illinois
F	21	John Drish	—	—	Jr	Evanston, Illinois
F	22	Scott Gill	—	—	So
F	24	David Miller	—	—	So	Taylorville, Illinois
F	28	Leonard Sharp	—	—	So	Kewanee, Illinois
F	29	Howard Cronk	—	—	So
F	30	Paul Milosevich	—	—	So	Zeigler, Illinois

Head coach

- Douglas Mills (University of Illinois) (4th year)

Assistant coach(es)

- Wally Roettger (University of Illinois) (5th year)
- Howie Braun (University of Illinois) (3rd year)
- Ralph Fletcher (1st year)

Legend

- (C) Team captain
- (S) Suspended
- (I) Ineligible
- (W) Walk-on
- Injured
- Current redshirt

Roster

== Schedule ==
Date time, TV	Rank^{#}	Opponent^{#}	Result	Record	Site (attendance) city, state
Non-Conference regular season
12/6/1939*		Monmouth (IL)	W 37–19	1–0	Huff Hall (4,346); Champaign, IL
12/6/1939*		Wabash	W 60–21	2–0	Huff Hall (4,346); Champaign, IL
12/15/1939*		Carleton	W 46–15	3–0	Huff Hall (4,164); Champaign, IL
12/18/1939*		Princeton	W 41–25	4–0	Huff Hall (4,346); Champaign, IL
12/27/1939*		Notre Dame	W 42–29	5–0	Huff Hall (3,747); Champaign, IL
12/29/1939*		at Drake	W 35–34	6–0	Drake Fieldhouse (–); Des Moines, IA
1/1/1940		at Butler	W 37–18	7–0	Hinkle Fieldhouse (4,000); Indianapolis, IN
Big Ten regular season
1/6/1940		at Indiana; Rivalry	L 36–38	7–1 (0–1)	Wildermuth Intramural Center (6,000); Bloomington, IN
1/8/1940		University of Chicago	W 34–33	8–1 (1–1)	Huff Hall (5,200); Champaign, IL
1/13/1940		at Ohio State	L 31–37	8–2 (1–2)	Ohio Expo Center Coliseum (4,046); Columbus, OH
1/15/1940		at Michigan	W 48–43	9–2 (2–2)	Yost Fieldhouse (4,500); Ann Arbor, MI
2/3/1940*		at Notre Dame	L 40–58	9–3	Notre Dame Fieldhouse (5,500); Notre Dame, IN
2/10/1940		Minnesota	W 60–31	10–3 (3–2)	Huff Hall (5,402); Champaign, IL
2/12/1940		Northwestern; Rivalry	W 35–33	11–3 (4–2)	Huff Hall (5,400); Champaign, IL
2/17/1940		at Purdue	L 27–33	11–4 (4–3)	Lambert Fieldhouse (8,800); West Lafayette, IN
2/19/1940		Wisconsin	W 37–35	12–4 (5–3)	Huff Hall (5,400); Champaign, IL
2/24/1940		Michigan	W 51–28	13–4 (6–3)	Huff Hall (5,692); Champaign, IL
2/26/1940		at University of Chicago	W 42–40	14–4 (7–3)	Henry Crown Field House (3,500); Chicago, IL
3/2/1940		at Iowa; Rivalry	L 47–62	14–5 (7–4)	Iowa Field House (7,000); Iowa City, IA
3/4/1940		Purdue	L 31–34	14–6 (7–5)	Huff Hall (7,172); Champaign, IL
*Non-conference game. ^{#}Rankings from AP Poll. (#) Tournament seedings in parentheses. All times are in Central Time.

== Player stats ==
Player	Games played	Field goals	Free throws	Points
William Hapac	18	95	54	244
Walter Evers	17	40	33	113
Victor Wukovits	19	32	28	92
Colin Handlon	19	23	23	69
Joe Frank	19	25	10	60
John Drish	18	20	7	47
Harold Shapiro	15	17	5	39
William Hocking	13	13	9	35
Henry Sachs	18	15	2	32
Robert Richmond	10	10	9	29
Robert O'Neill	10	10	6	26
Howard Cronk	10	3	2	8
Rex Sherman	4	3	0	6
Paul Milosevich	1	1	1	3
Scott Gill	1	1	1	3
Frederick Townshend	4	1	1	3
Norman Cusick	1	1	0	2
Kenneth Brown	1	1	0	2
Edward Evers	5	0	2	2
Harry Lasater	5	1	0	2
Leonard Sharp	1	0	1	1

== Awards and honors ==
- William Hapac
  - Helms 1st team All-American (Consensus)
  - Converse 1st team All-American
