= Edward J. Hickox =

American basketball coach and administrator

Ed Hickox
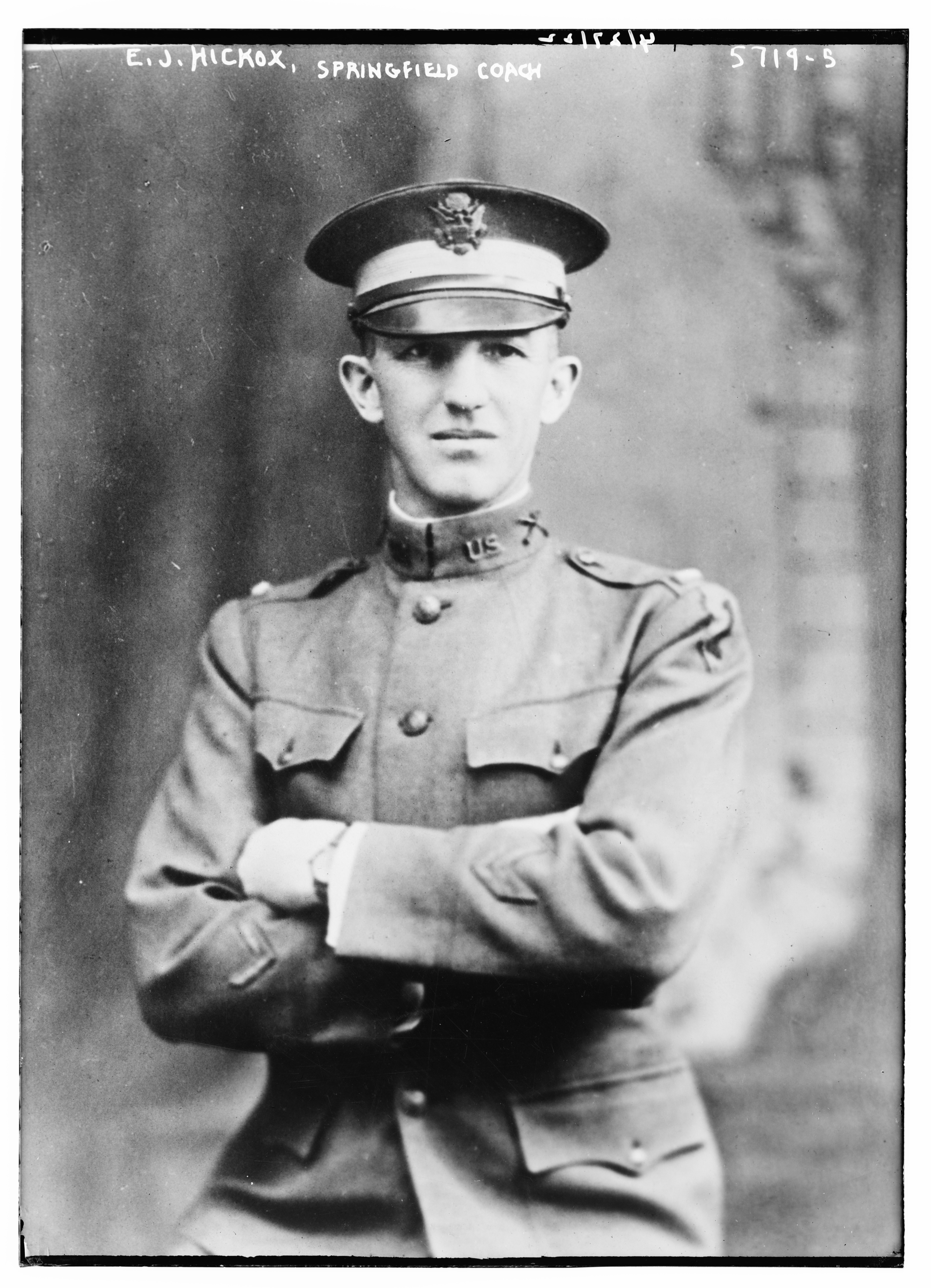

Biographical details
- Born: April 10, 1878; Cleveland, Ohio, U.S.
- Died: January 28, 1966 (aged 87); Springfield, Massachusetts, U.S.

Playing career

Football
- 1901–1904: Ohio Wesleyan

Coaching career (HC unless noted)

Football
- 1905–1906: Dickinson Academy (PA)
- 1907: Southwestern Normal (OK)
- 1908–1909: Fort Collins HS (CO)
- 1910–1911: Eaton HS (CO)
- 1922–1923: Springfield

Basketball
- 1914–1915: Colorado College
- 1926–1942: Springfield
- 1944–1947: American International

Head coaching record
- Overall: 6–12–1 (college football); 251–106 (college basketball)
- Tournaments: Basketball; 0–1 (NCAA)
- Basketball Hall of Fame; Inducted in 1959 (profile)
- College Basketball Hall of Fame; Inducted in 2006

Edward Junge Hickox (April 10, 1878 – January 28, 1966) was an American basketball coach and administrator. Born in Cleveland, Ohio, he coached the basketball team of Springfield College from 1926 to 1941, coached the American International College basketball team from 1944 to 1947, was a chairman of the National Basketball Rules Committee from 1945 to 1948, served on the board of directors of the Basketball Hall of Fame from 1959 to 1966 and was an executive secretary of the Hall of Fame from 1949 to 1963.

Hickox was enshrined in the Naismith Memorial Basketball Hall of Fame as a contributor in 1959. He died January 28, 1966, at Springfield Hospital in Springfield, Massachusetts.

== Head coaching record ==
=== College football ===
Year	Team	Overall	Conference	Standing	Bowl/playoffs
Southwestern Normal Bulldogs (Independent) (1907)
1907	Southwestern Normal	0–3–1			
Southwestern Normal:		0–3–1			
Springfield Red and White (Independent) (1922–1923)
1922	Springfield	6–2			
1923	Springfield	0–7			
Springfield:		6–9			
Total:		6–12–1			

=== College basketball ===
Record table
Season	Team	Overall	Conference	Standing	Postseason
Colorado College Tigers (Independent) (1914–1915)
1914–15	Colorado College	3–5			
Colorado College:		3–5 (.375)			
Springfield Gymnasts (Independent) (1926–1942)
1926–27	Springfield	13–1			
1927–28	Springfield	18–2			
1928–29	Springfield	14–3			
1929–30	Springfield	10–7			
1930–31	Springfield	11–6			
1931–32	Springfield	10–5			
1932–33	Springfield	9–8			
1933–34	Springfield	11–5			
1934–35	Springfield	14–6			
1935–36	Springfield	17–4			
1936–37	Springfield	18–3			
1937–38	Springfield	13–7			
1938–39	Springfield	12–8			
1939–40	Springfield	16–3			NCAA Elite Eight
1940–41	Springfield	9–11			
1941–42	Springfield	14–6			
Springfield:		209–85 (.711)			
American International Aces (Independent) (1944–1947)
1944–45	American International	8–1			
1945–46	American International	21–3			
1946–47	American International	10–12			
American International:		39–16 (.709)			
Total:		251–106 (.703)			
