= Lee Huber =

American basketball player

Personal information
- Born: February 16, 1919 Louisville, Kentucky, U.S.
- Died: September 22, 2005 (aged 86) Orlando, Florida, U.S.
- Listed height: 6 ft 0 in (1.83 m)
- Listed weight: 175 lb (79 kg)

Career information
- High school: St. Xavier (Louisville, Kentucky)
- College: Kentucky (1938–1941)
- Playing career: 1941–1942
- Position: Guard

Career history
- 1941–1942: Akron Goodyear Wingfoots

Career highlights
- First-team All-American – Helms (1941)

Lee Gohmann Huber (February 16, 1919 – September 22, 2005) was an American basketball player in the National Basketball League (NBL) of the United States, a forerunner to the National Basketball Association. A 6'0" guard from Louisville, Kentucky, Huber played college basketball for coach Adolph Rupp at the University of Kentucky from 1938 to 1941, where he was named a first-team All-American by the Helms Athletic Foundation in 1941. After college, Huber played one season in the NBL for the Akron Goodyear Wingfoots, averaging 6.4 points per game.

Huber left basketball after deciding that it would not be a profession that could support his family. He served for the United States Navy in World War II, then settled into a private business career. Huber died on September 22, 2005, in Orlando, Florida.
