= John Adams (basketball) =

American basketball player (1917–1979)

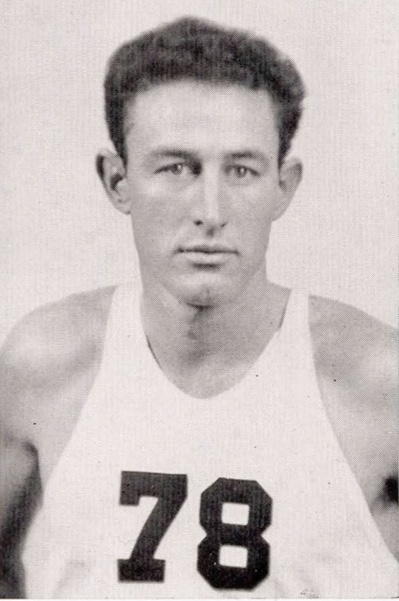
- Adams during his senior season at Arkansas

Personal information
- Born: April 9, 1917
- Died: June 1979 (aged 62) Bartlesville, Oklahoma, U.S.
- Listed height: 6 ft 3 in (1.91 m)

Career information
- High school: Beebe (Beebe, Arkansas)
- College: Arkansas (1938–1941)
- Position: Guard / forward

Career highlights
- Consensus first-team All-American (1941); 2× All-SWC (1940, 1941)

John Adams (April 9, 1917 – June 1979) was an American basketball player. He was an All-American player at Arkansas in the 1940s. Adams is one of several men credited with creating the jump shot in basketball.

John Adams, a 6'3 guard/forward, grew up in El Paso, Arkansas and starred for two years at El Paso High School. He was then recruited away to Beebe High School in nearby Beebe. It was under the low ceilings of Beebe High home court where Adams learned to flatten the trajectory of his shot, becoming one of the early pioneers of the jump shot.

Adams then went to the University of Arkansas on a basketball scholarship. He lettered from 1938 to 1941 and led the Razorbacks to the 1941 NCAA Final Four, where they fell to the Washington State Cougars.

Adams was the leading scorer in the tournament, netting 48 points in two games. Adams was the first Razorback to score 30+ points in a single game. He was a two-time all Southwest Conference pick and a Consensus first team All-American in 1941.

After his collegiate career ended, Adams played for the Phillips 66ers in the AAU. He was named to the Arkansas Sports Hall of Fame in 1979. He died of cancer three months later in Bartlesville, Oklahoma.
