= Gus Broberg =

American lawyer (1920–2001)

Personal information
- Born: June 16, 1920 Connecticut, U.S.
- Died: November 23, 2001 (aged 81) Palm Beach, Florida, U.S.
- Listed height: 6 ft 1 in (1.85 m)

Career information
- High school: Torrington (Torrington, Connecticut)
- College: Dartmouth (1938–1941)
- Position: Forward

Career highlights
- 2× Consensus first-team All-American (1940, 1941)

Gustave Theodore Broberg, Jr. (June 16, 1920 – November 23, 2001) was an American college basketball standout, World War II pilot, lawyer and judge.

An American, Broberg played basketball as a 6 ft 1 in (1.85 m) forward at Dartmouth College from 1938 to 1941, where he became the first Ivy League player to lead the conference in scoring for three straight seasons; he scored 13.8 points per game (ppg) as a sophomore, 14.5 ppg as a junior and 14.9 ppg as a senior. Broberg was a Helms Foundation First Team All-American as a sophomore in 1938–39, and then a two-time Consensus First Team All-American in 1940 and 1941.

Broberg played minor league baseball for a brief stint after he graduated from college, but then enlisted in the United States Marine Corps to serve as a pilot in World War II. He lost his right arm when his plane crashed, earning him a Purple Heart.

He then became a lawyer and later on a judge in Florida after earning his J.D. from the University of Virginia School of Law in 1948.

Broberg's son, Pete Broberg, would pitch in Major League Baseball and both would be inducted into the Palm Beach Sports Hall of Fame in 1984.
