= 1937–38 Iowa State Cyclones men's basketball team =

American college basketball season

1937–38 Iowa State Cyclones men's basketball
- Conference: Big Six Conference
- Record: 6–9 (2–8 Big Six)
- Head coach: Louis Menze (10th season)
- Home arena: State Gymnasium

1937–38 Big Six Conference men's basketball standings
	Conf.				Overall
Team	W		L	PCT	W		L	PCT
Kansas	9	–	1	.900	18	–	2	.900
Oklahoma	8	–	2	.800	14	–	4	.778
Missouri	4	–	6	.400	9	–	9	.500
Nebraska	4	–	6	.400	9	–	11	.450
Kansas State	3	–	7	.300	7	–	11	.389
Iowa State	2	–	8	.200	6	–	9	.400

The 1937–38 Iowa State Cyclones men's basketball team represented Iowa State University during the 1937–38 NCAA men's basketball season. The Cyclones were coached by Louis Menze, who was in his tenth season with the Cyclones. They played their home games at the State Gymnasium in Ames, Iowa.

They finished the season 6–9, 2–8 in Big Six play to finish in sixth place.

== Roster ==
1937–38 Iowa State Cyclones men's basketball team
Players
Coaches

Pos.	#	Name	Height	Weight	Year	Hometown
F		Wendell Allan	—	—	So	Ames, Iowa
F		Harlan Anderson	—	—
F		Don Beresford	6 ft 0 in (1.83 m)	—
G		Bob Blahnik (C)	—	—	Sr
G		Bill Bliss	—	190 lb (86 kg)	So	Ames, Iowa
G		Chuck Heileman	—	—
C		Alan Kilborn	6 ft 6 in (1.98 m)	—
		Everett Kischer	5 ft 9 in (1.75 m)	150 lb (68 kg)
G		Bob Kliebenstein	—	—
F		Warren Maxon	—	—	So	Webster City, Iowa
F		Bob Menze	—	—	So
F		Harry Roschlau	—	—	Jr
		Rowland Rushmore	—	—
C		Hilary Ryan	6 ft 1 in (1.85 m)	—	So	Ames, Iowa
		Hugh Vickerstaff	—	—

Head coach

- Louis Menze

Assistant coach(es)

Legend

- (C) Team captain
- (S) Suspended
- (I) Ineligible
- (W) Walk-on
- Injured
- Current redshirt

== Schedule and results ==
Date time, TV	Rank^{#}	Opponent^{#}	Result	Record	Site city, state
Regular season
December 3, 1937*; 7:30 pm		Simpson	W 41–37	1–0	State Gymnasium; Ames, Iowa
December 6, 1937*		at Iowa State Teachers; Iowa Big Four	W 30–26	2–0	Cedar Falls, Iowa
December 10, 1937*		Cornell	L 26–28 ^{OT}	2–1	State Gymnasium; Ames, Iowa
December 13, 1937*		Grinnell	W 28–26	3–1	State Gymnasium; Ames, Iowa
December 31, 1937*		Iowa State Teachers; Iowa Big Four	W 35–28	4–1	State Gymnasium; Ames, Iowa
January 8, 1938		Kansas State	W 41–30	5–1 (1–0)	State Gymnasium; Ames, Iowa
January 15, 1938		at Kansas	L 17–31	5–2 (1–1)	Hoch Auditorium; Lawrence, Kansas
January 17, 1938		at Oklahoma	L 29–46	5–3 (1–2)	OU Field House; Norman, Oklahoma
January 21, 1938		at Missouri	L 34–43	5–4 (1–3)	Brewer Fieldhouse; Columbia, Missouri
January 29, 1938		Nebraska	L 32–35	5–5 (1–4)	State Gymnasium; Ames, Iowa
February 5, 1938		Missouri	W 38–35	6–5 (2–4)	State Gymnasium; Ames, Iowa
February 12, 1938		at Kansas State	L 29–51	6–6 (2–5)	Nichols Hall; Manhattan, Kansas
February 14, 1938		at Nebraska	L 23–50	6–7 (2–6)	Nebraska Coliseum; Lincoln, Nebraska
February 21, 1938		Kansas	L 23–31	6–8 (2–7)	State Gymnasium; Ames, Iowa
February 26, 1938		Oklahoma	L 32–35	6–9 (2–8)	State Gymnasium; Ames, Iowa
*Non-conference game. ^{#}Rankings from AP poll. (#) Tournament seedings in parentheses. All times are in Central Time.
