= Paul Lindemann =

American basketball player

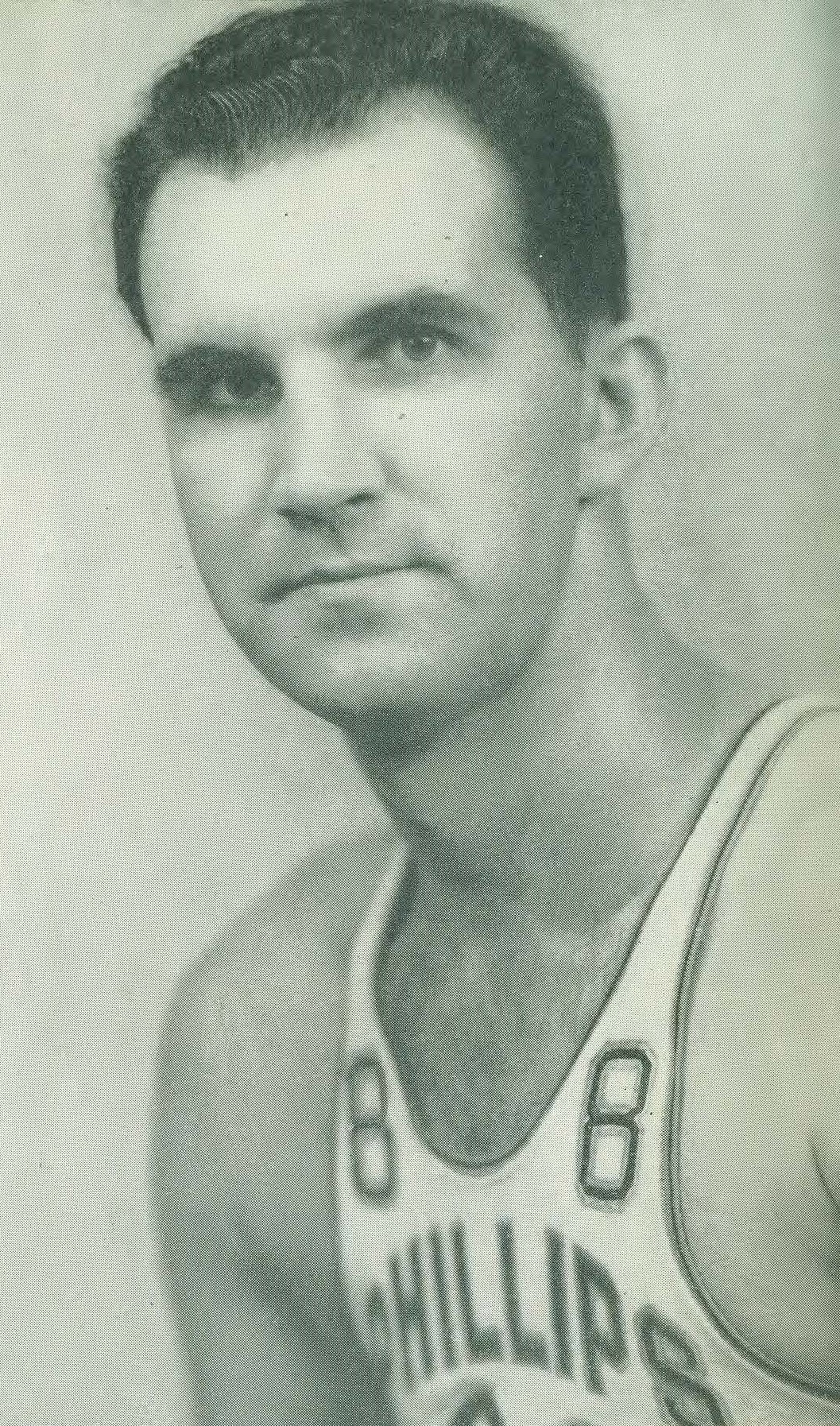
- Lindemann with the Phillips 66ers

Personal information
- Born: April 30, 1918
- Died: June 24, 1990 (aged 72) Bartlesville, Oklahoma, U.S.
- Listed height: 6 ft 7 in (2.01 m)
- Listed weight: 230 lb (104 kg)

Career information
- College: Washington State (1938–1941)
- Position: Center
- Number: 6

Career highlights
- AAU All-American (1945); Consensus second-team All-American (1941); First-team All-PCC (1941)

Paul F. Lindemann (April 30, 1918 – June 24, 1990) was an American basketball player who was an All-American at Washington State University in 1941 and was later an AAU All-American with the Bartlesville Phillips 66ers.

Lindemann was a 6'7 center at Washington State from 1938 to 1941, leading the Cougars to a 72–26 record over his three varsity seasons and to their best post–season finish in program history. He averaged 7.1 points per game for his career, including a career best 10.3 in the 1940–41 season, at a time when teams routinely scored in the 40s. Lindeman was the centerpiece of head coach Jack Friel's best team, his 1940–41 squad that made it all the way to the NCAA championship game. Lindemann was the driving force behind the run, leading the Cougars in scoring in their first two games (26 against Creighton and 14 against Arkansas). However, Wisconsin – the Cougars' championship opponent – effectively gameplanned Lindemann as they held the big center scoreless from the field. Lindemann was named first team All-Pacific Coast Conference and was a consensus second team All-American.

After his collegiate career was over, Lindemann opted to join the powerhouse Bartlesville Phillips 66ers of the AAU. He played for them for five years, earning AAU All-American honors in 1945. After the end of his athletic career, Lindemann stayed on with the Phillips Petroleum Company in business roles.

Lindemann was inducted into the Washington State University Athletic Hall of Fame in 1980 and the Pac-10 Hall of Honor in 2010. He died on June 24, 1990, of Goodpasture's syndrome.
