= National Association of Basketball Coaches =

American trade association

- Formation: 1927
- Founder: Phog Allen
- Type: Professional association
- Region served: USA
- President: Matt Margenthaler
- Website: https://nabc.com

The National Association of Basketball Coaches (NABC), headquartered in Kansas City, Missouri, is an American organization of men's college basketball coaches. It was founded in 1927 by Phog Allen, the men's basketball head coach for the University of Kansas.

Formation of the NABC began when Joint Basketball Rules Committee, then the central governing authority of the game, announced without notice that it had adopted a change in the rules which virtually eliminated dribbling. Allen, a student of basketball founder James Naismith, organized a nationwide protest which ultimately resulted in the dribble remaining part of the game.

In 1939, the NABC held the first national basketball tournament in Evanston, Illinois at the Northwestern Fieldhouse. Oregon defeated Ohio State for the first tournament championship. The next year, the NABC asked the NCAA to take over the administration of the tournament. In exchange, the NCAA provided complimentary tickets for NABC members to the Finals and placed an NABC member on its Tournament Committee.

NABC initiatives include establishing the original Basketball Hall of Fame in Springfield, Massachusetts, the format of today's NCAA basketball tournament, and the College Basketball Experience and National Collegiate Basketball Hall of Fame at the T-Mobile Center in downtown Kansas City, Missouri. This facility was completed on October 10, 2007.

== Awards ==
- NABC Player of the Year
- NABC Defensive Player of the Year
- NABC Freshman of the Year
- Pete Newell Big Man Award
- NABC Coach of the Year

== All-District ==
NABC annually names its All-District Teams, which honors the top Division I players in each district. Regions are divided by college athletic conferences.

NABC Districts
District	Conferences
1	America East Conference
1	Metro Atlantic Athletic Conference
2	Atlantic Coast Conference
3	ASUN Conference
3	Big South Conference
4	Atlantic 10 Conference
5	Big East Conference
6	Big Sky Conference
6	Western Athletic Conference
7	Big Ten Conference
8	Big 12 Conference
9	Big West Conference
9	West Coast Conference
10	Colonial Athletic Association
11	Conference USA
12	Horizon League
12	The Summit League
13	Ivy League
13	Patriot League
13	Independents (none since 2014–15)
14	Mid-American Conference
15	Mid-Eastern Athletic Conference
16	Missouri Valley Conference
17	Mountain West Conference
18	Northeast Conference
19	Ohio Valley Conference
20	Pac-12 Conference
21	Southeastern Conference
22	Southern Conference
23	Southland Conference
23	Southwestern Athletic Conference
24	Sun Belt Conference
25	American Athletic Conference

== See also ==
- Women's Basketball Coaches Association
