= Phog Allen =

American football and basketball coach (1885-1974)

- Allen c. 1935

Biographical details
- Born: November 18, 1885; Jamesport, Missouri, U.S.
- Died: September 16, 1974 (aged 88); Lawrence, Kansas, U.S.
- Education: University of Kansas; Central College of Osteopathy (D.O.)

Playing career

Basketball
- 1905–1907: Kansas

Baseball
- 1906–1907: Kansas

Coaching career (HC unless noted)

Basketball
- 1905–1908: Baker
- 1907–1909: Kansas
- 1908–1909: Haskell
- 1912–1919: Warrensburg Teachers
- 1919–1956: Kansas

Football
- 1912–1917: Warrensburg Teachers
- 1920: Kansas

Baseball
- 1941–1942: Kansas

Administrative career (AD unless noted)
- 1912–1919: Warrensburg Teachers
- 1919–1937: Kansas

Head coaching record
- Overall: 34–19–3 (football); 746–264 (basketball); 6–17–1 (baseball)
- Tournaments: Basketball; 10–3 (NCAA)

Accomplishments and honors

Championships
- Basketball; 2 Helms Athletic Foundation national (1922, 1923); NCAA tournament (1952); 2 MIAA (1913, 1914); 24 MVIAA/Big 6/Big 7/Big 8 (1908, 1909, 1922–1927, 1931–1934, 1936–1938, 1940–1943, 1946, 1950, 1952–1954); Football; 4 MIAA (1912–1915)
- Basketball Hall of Fame; Inducted in 1959 (profile)
- College Basketball Hall of Fame; Inducted in 2006
Medal record
Assistant for United States
Olympic Games
Gold medal – first place	1952 Helsinki	Assistant coach

Forrest Clare "Phog" Allen (November 18, 1885 – September 16, 1974) was an American basketball coach and physician. Known as the "Father of Basketball Coaching," he served as the head basketball coach at Baker University (1905–1908), the University of Kansas (1907–1909, 1919–1956), Haskell Institute—now Haskell Indian Nations University (1908–1909), and Warrensburg Teachers College—now the University of Central Missouri (1912–1919), compiling a career college basketball head coaching record of 746–264. In his 39 seasons at the helm of the Kansas Jayhawks men's basketball program, his teams won 24 conference championships and three national titles.

The Helms Athletic Foundation retroactively recognized Allen's 1921–22 and 1922–23 Kansas teams as national champions. Allen's 1951–52 squad won the 1952 NCAA tournament and his Jayhawks were runners-up in the NCAA Tournament in 1940 and 1953. His 590 wins are the second most of any coach in the history of the storied Kansas basketball program.

Allen attended the University of Kansas, having already acquired the nickname "Phog" for the distinctive foghorn voice he had as a baseball umpire. At KU, Allen was a member of Phi Kappa Psi fraternity.

He lettered in baseball and basketball, the latter under James Naismith, the inventor of the game. Allen served as the head football coach at Warrensburg Teachers College from 1912 to 1917 and at Kansas for one season in 1920, amassing a career college football head coaching record of 34–19–3. He also coached baseball at Kansas for two seasons, in 1941 and 1942, tallying a mark of 6–17–1, and was the university's athletic director from 1919 to 1937.

Allen was inducted into the Naismith Memorial Basketball Hall of Fame with the inaugural class of 1959. The home basketball arena at the University of Kansas, Allen Fieldhouse, was named in his honor when it opened in 1955. His final season at Kansas was the first full season the Jayhawks played at Allen Fieldhouse.

== Early life ==
Allen was born in the town of Jamesport, Missouri. His father, William Allen, was among the 30 people who originally incorporated Jameson, Missouri in 1879 and the doctor who delivered Allen lived in Jameson. However, he had strong ties to Jamesport where he was town clerk, collector, and constable. His family later moved to Independence, Missouri.

James Naismith, the man who created basketball, coached Allen from 1905 to 1907 at the University of Kansas in Lawrence. Allen spent his last two years in school (1907–09) as the team's coach. Naismith inspired Phog Allen to pursue a medical degree as well. After two years of coaching, Allen took a three-year break to complete his degree at Kansas City's Central College of Osteopathy (now Kansas City University College of Osteopathic Medicine). After graduating from medical school, Allen integrated numerous concepts of healthy eating, efficient exercise regimens, and proper body alignment into his coaching. A section on sports medicine was included in his book, My Basket-Ball Bible. Among the many elite athletes he treated at his downtown office at 13 E. 8th St. was Mickey Mantle.

== Playing career ==
Allen began classes at the University of Kansas in 1904, where he lettered three years in basketball under James Naismith's coaching, and two years in baseball. Unlike his time as a coach, the Jayhawks struggled on the court. In his three seasons as a player, the team only had one winning season. He was a player for the team for the Jayhawks' first games in their rivalries against Kansas State and Missouri. In 1905 he also played for the Kansas City Athletic Club.

== Coaching career ==
=== Basketball ===
Allen coached at William Chrisman High School (then known as Independence High School) in Independence, Missouri, the University of Kansas, Baker University, Haskell Institute, and Warrensburg Teachers College in Warrensburg, Missouri.

Allen launched his coaching career at his alma mater in 1907, but took a hiatus after graduating in 1909 to study osteopathic medicine at Central College of Osteopathy in Kansas City, Missouri. Known as “Doc” to his players and students, he was reputed to be a colorful figure on the University of Kansas campus, coaching all sports and becoming known for his osteopathic manipulation techniques for ailing athletes.

Allen was a legend in the field of treatment of athletic injuries and benefited a long list of high-profile performers. He also had a successful private osteopathic practice, and many he treated, the famous and otherwise, contended he had a "magic touch" for such ailments as bad backs, knees and ankles. He said he applied the same treatments to "civilians" as he did to his athletes.

His forceful, yet reasonable, disposition helped him become the driving force behind the acceptance of basketball as an official Olympic sport at the 1936 Summer Olympic Games. Allen later worked as an assistant coach in the 1952 Summer Olympics, helping to lead the United States to the gold medal in Helsinki, Finland.

He coached college basketball for 50 seasons, and compiled a 746–264 record, retiring with the all-time record for most coaching wins in college basketball history at the time. During his tenure at Kansas, Allen coached Dutch Lonborg, Adolph Rupp, Ralph Miller and Dean Smith, all future Hall of Fame coaches. During the summers of 1930, 1931, and 1932, he directed the prestigious basketball coaching program at Springfield College in Massachusetts, the birthplace of basketball. While at Springfield College, Allen developed a close friendship with his assistant, Lee Patton, who later became a legendary basketball coach at West Virginia University. He also coached John Bunn, who is a member of the Hall of Fame and did go on to coach at Stanford, but he is honored as a contributor to the game of basketball.

Additional former players that make up Allen's coaching tree who coached at the collegiate level but are not enshrined in the Hall of Fame include Frosty Cox, George E. Rody, Andrew McDonald, Charlie T. Black, Howard Engleman and his replacement upon retirement Dick Harp. Among the Hall of Fame players he coached were Paul Endacott, Bill Johnson, and Clyde Lovellette. He also recruited Wilt Chamberlain to Kansas, and even coached former United States Senate Majority Leader Bob Dole. Allen Fieldhouse, the basketball arena on the campus of the University of Kansas, is named in his honor. A banner that hangs in the rafters of Allen Fieldhouse reads: "Pay heed all who enter, beware of the Phog." He was enshrined as part of the inaugural class in the Basketball Hall of Fame in 1959.

Allen also created the National Association of Basketball Coaches, which went on to create the NCAA tournament.

=== Football ===
==== Warrensburg ====
Allen coached the football team at Warrensburg Teacher's College, now known as University of Central Missouri. At Warrensburg, he coached for six seasons. The team won their conference title each of his first four seasons as coach. He left after the 1917 and focused on his basketball coaching duties. He finished his time at the school with a 29–17–2 record.

==== Kansas ====
Allen was hired as the coach for the Jayhawks football team in 1920. The Jayhawks began the season 5–0, including a 14–0 victory over rival Kansas State. Kansas would lose 2 of their last 3 games and tie the other game to finish the season 5–2–1. They finished 3rd in the MVIAA. Allen resigned at the conclusion of the season to focus on his duties as the men's basketball coach, coaching only one season for the football program.

== Head coaching record ==
=== Basketball ===
Record table
Season	Team	Overall	Conference	Standing	Postseason
Baker Wildcats (Independent) (1905–1908)
1905–06	Baker	18–3			
1906–07	Baker	14–0			
1907–08	Baker	13–6			
Baker:		45–9 (.833)			
Kansas Jayhawks (Missouri Valley Intercollegiate Athletic Association) (1907–1909)
1907–08	Kansas	18–6	6–0	1st (North)	
1908–09	Kansas	25–3	8–2	1st (North)	
Haskell Indians (Independent) (1908–1909)
1908–09	Haskell	27–5			
Haskell:		27–5 (.844)			
Warrensburg Teachers (Missouri Intercollegiate Athletic Association) (1912–1919)
1912–13	Warrensburg Teachers	11–7	6–0	1st	
1913–14	Warrensburg Teachers	15–4	9–1	1st	
1914–15	Warrensburg Teachers	13–4			
1915–16	Warrensburg Teachers	9–4			
1916–17	Warrensburg Teachers	13–2			
1917–18	Warrensburg Teachers	9–4			
1918–19	Warrensburg Teachers	14–6			
Warrensburg Teachers:		84–31 (.730)			
Kansas Jayhawks (MVIAA/Big Six/Big Seven/Big Eight Conference) (1919–1956)
1919–20	Kansas	10–7	9–7	3rd	
1920–21	Kansas	10–8	10–8	4th	
1921–22	Kansas	16–2	15–1	T–1st	Helms National Champion
1922–23	Kansas	17–1	16–0	1st	Helms National Champion
1923–24	Kansas	16–3	15–1	1st	
1924–25	Kansas	17–1	15–1	1st	
1925–26	Kansas	16–2	16–2	1st	
1926–27	Kansas	15–2	10–2	1st	
1927–28	Kansas	9–9	9–9	4th	
1928–29	Kansas	3–15	2–8	T–5th	
1929–30	Kansas	14–4	7–3	2nd	
1930–31	Kansas	15–3	7–3	1st	
1931–32	Kansas	13–5	7–3	1st	
1932–33	Kansas	13–4	8–2	1st	
1933–34	Kansas	16–1	9–1	1st	
1934–35	Kansas	15–5	12–4	2nd	
1935–36	Kansas	21–2	10–0	1st	
1936–37	Kansas	15–4	8–2	T–1st	
1937–38	Kansas	18–2	9–1	1st	
1938–39	Kansas	13–7	6–4	3rd	
1939–40	Kansas	19–6	8–2	T–1st	NCAA Runner-up
1940–41	Kansas	12–6	7–3	T–1st	
1941–42	Kansas	17–5	8–2	T–1st	NCAA Regional Third Place
1942–43	Kansas	22–6	10–0	1st	
1943–44	Kansas	17–9	5–5	3rd	
1944–45	Kansas	12–5	7–3	2nd	
1945–46	Kansas	19–2	10–0	1st	
1946–47	Kansas	8–5 (Note: Allen was ordered to take a rest due to illness after a game against Missouri on January 7. Howard Engleman assumed the role of interim head coach, guiding Kansas to an 8–6 record over the final 14 games of the season. The Jayhawks finished in third place in the Big Six with a conference record of 5–5.)	0–1		
1947–48	Kansas	9–15	4–8	T–6th	
1948–49	Kansas	12–12	3–9	T–6th	
1949–50	Kansas	14–11	8–4	T–1st	
1950–51	Kansas	16–8	8–4	T–2nd	
1951–52	Kansas	28–3	11–1	1st	NCAA Champion
1952–53	Kansas	19–6	10–2	1st	NCAA Runner-up
1953–54	Kansas	16–5	10–2	T–1st	
1954–55	Kansas	11–10	5–7	5th	
1955–56	Kansas	14–9	6–6	5th	
Kansas:		590–219 (.729)	334–123 (.731)		
Total:		746–264 (.739)			
National champion Postseason invitational champion Conference regular season champion Conference regular season and conference tournament champion Division regular season champion Division regular season and conference tournament champion Conference tournament champion

=== Football ===
Year	Team	Overall	Conference	Standing	Bowl/playoffs
Warrensburg Teachers (Missouri Intercollegiate Athletic Association) (1912–1917)
1912	Warrensburg Teachers	6–2		1st	
1913	Warrensburg Teachers	7–2		1st	
1914	Warrensburg Teachers	5–4		1st	
1915	Warrensburg Teachers	4–2–2		1st	
1916	Warrensburg Teachers	6–3			
1917	Warrensburg Teachers	1–4			
Warrensburg Teachers:		29–17–2			
Kansas Jayhawks (Missouri Valley Conference) (1920)
1920	Kansas	5–2–1	3–2	T–3rd	
Kansas:		5–2–1	3–2		
Total:		34–19–1			

== See also ==
- List of college men's basketball career coaching wins leaders
- List of NCAA Division I men's basketball tournament Final Four appearances by coach
