= Marv Huffman =

American basketball player

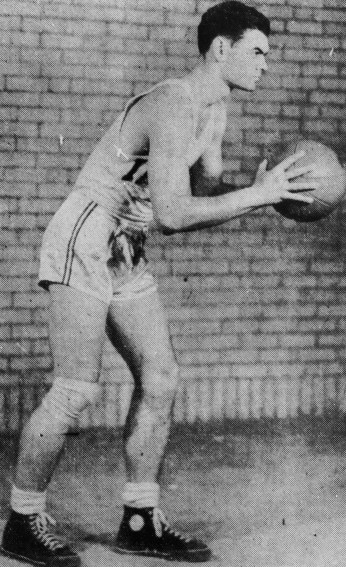
- Huffman, circa 1938

Personal information
- Born: March 14, 1917 New Castle, Indiana, U.S.
- Died: May 15, 1983 (aged 66) Akron, Ohio, U.S.
- Listed height: 6 ft 2 in (1.88 m)

Career information
- High school: New Castle (New Castle, Indiana)
- College: Indiana (1937–1940)
- Position: Forward

Career history
- 1940–1941: Akron Goodyear Wingfoots

Career highlights
- NCAA champion (1940); NCAA Final Four Most Outstanding Player (1940); Consensus second-team All-American (1940)

Marvin Huffman (March 14, 1917 – May 15, 1983) was an American basketball player.

A 6'2" forward, Huffman starred at New Castle High School in Indiana, where he started every game for four years. He then played collegiately at Indiana University, leading the Hoosiers to the 1940 NCAA Championship. After scoring a team-high 12 points in the deciding game over the University of Kansas, Huffman received the second-ever NCAA basketball tournament Most Outstanding Player award and earned Converse First Team All-American honors.

Huffman later had a brief professional career with the Akron Wingfoots of the National Basketball League, a forerunner to the NBA. During the 1940–41 NBL season, he averaged 5.1 points in 22 games.

Huffman was inducted into the Indiana Basketball Hall of Fame in 1981 and the Indiana University Athletic Hall of Fame in 1989.

Huffman' brother Vern was also an All-American basketball player for IU and later went on to play professional football for the Detroit Lions.

He graduated from Harvard University Business School's Advanced Management Program in 1952.
