= Branch McCracken =

American basketball player and coach

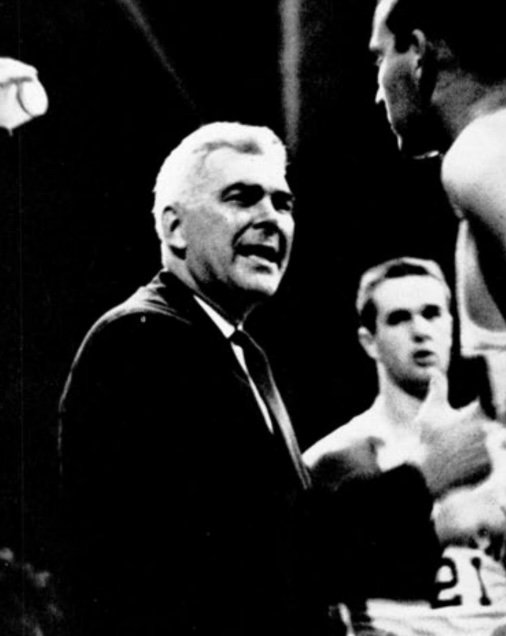

Biographical details
- Born: June 9, 1908; Monrovia, Indiana, U.S.
- Died: June 4, 1970 (aged 61); Bloomington, Indiana, U.S.

Playing career
- 1928–1930: Indiana
- Positions: Center, forward, guard

Coaching career (HC unless noted)
- 1930–1938: Ball State
- 1938–1943: Indiana
- 1946–1965: Indiana

Head coaching record
- Overall: 450–231

Accomplishments and honors

Championships
- 2 NCAA tournament (1940, 1953); 4 Big Ten regular season (1953, 1954, 1957, 1958)

Awards
- UPI Coach of the Year (1953); Consensus All-American (1930)
- Basketball Hall of Fame; Inducted in 1960 (profile)
- College Basketball Hall of Fame; Inducted in 2006

Emmett B. "Branch" McCracken (June 9, 1908 – June 4, 1970) was an American basketball player and coach. He served as the head basketball coach at Ball State University from 1930 to 1938 and at Indiana University Bloomington from 1938 to 1943 and again from 1946 to 1965. At Indiana, McCracken's Hoosiers won the NCAA Championship in 1940 and 1953. He was inducted into the Naismith Memorial Basketball Hall of Fame as a player in 1960.

== Playing career ==
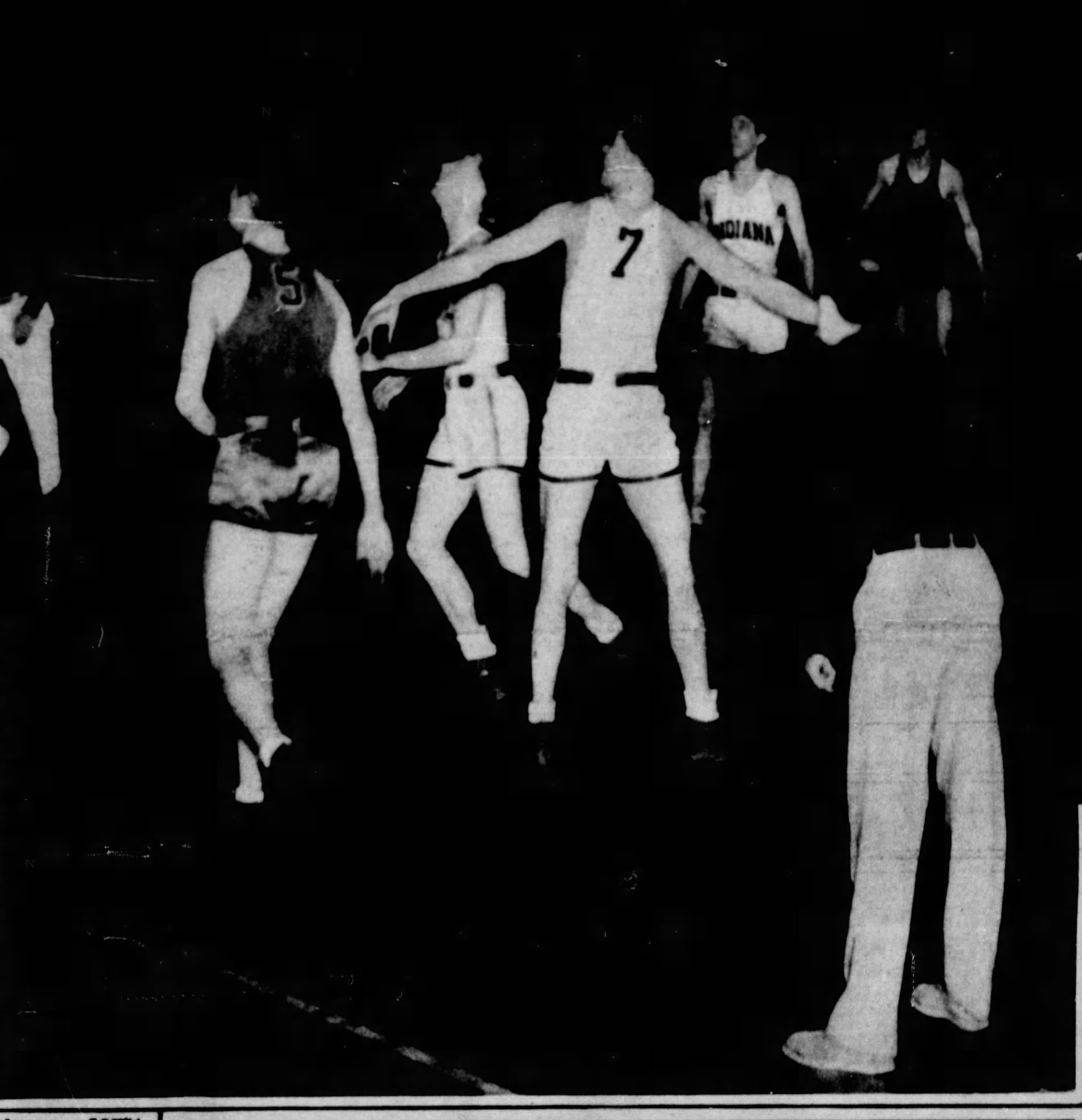
McCracken (number 7 in the photo) in action in a 1929 game vs. the Iowa Hawkeyes.

After his college career, McCracken played professional basketball for local teams, most notably the Fort Wayne Hoosiers in the ABL and the Indianapolis Kautskys with John Wooden and Frank Beard. This was often done while he was also coaching or working at another job and involved long car trips.

== Indiana coaching career ==
McCracken's first Indiana team was led by All-American Ernie Andres. In his first year, the team finished 17–3.

In 1960, the Indiana Hoosiers football program and all Indiana varsity sports, including basketball were sanctioned by the NCAA.

McCracken coached at Indiana for 23 years, ending with 364 wins and 210 Big Ten wins. He won four regular season Big Ten titles and went to the NCAA tournament four times, winning two national titles.

== Death ==
McCracken died on June 4, 1970, from heart failure. He was buried at Mount Pleasant Cemetery in Hall, Indiana.

== Legacy ==
McCracken was inducted into the Naismith Memorial Basketball Hall of Fame as a player in 1960. The gymnasium at Monrovia Jr.-Sr. High School is named after him; so is Indiana's court at Assembly Hall.

== Head coaching record ==
Record table
Season	Team	Overall	Conference	Standing	Postseason
Ball State Cardinals (Independent) (1930–1938)
1930–31	Ball State	9–5			
1931–32	Ball State	9–7			
1932–33	Ball State	7–9			
1933–34	Ball State	9–10			
1934–35	Ball State	9–9			
1935–36	Ball State	13–7			
1936–37	Ball State	13–6			
1937–38	Ball State	17–4			
Ball State:		86–57 (.601)			
Indiana Hoosiers (Big Ten Conference) (1938–1943)
1938–39	Indiana	17–3	9–3	2nd	
1939–40	Indiana	20–3	9–3	2nd	NCAA Champion
1940–41	Indiana	17–3	10–2	2nd	
1941–42	Indiana	15–6	10–5	T–2nd	
1942–43	Indiana	18–2	11–2	2nd	
Indiana Hoosiers (Big Ten Conference) (1946–1965)
1946–47	Indiana	12–8	8–4	T–2nd	
1947–48	Indiana	8–12	3–9	T–8th	
1948–49	Indiana	14–8	6–6	T–4th	
1949–50	Indiana	17–5	7–5	T–3rd	
1950–51	Indiana	19–3	12–2	2nd	
1951–52	Indiana	16–6	9–5	4th	
1952–53	Indiana	23–3	17–1	1st	NCAA Champion
1953–54	Indiana	20–4	12–2	1st	NCAA Sweet 16
1954–55	Indiana	8–14	5–9	T–6th	
1955–56	Indiana	13–9	6–8	T–6th	
1956–57	Indiana	14–8	10–4	T–1st	
1957–58	Indiana	13–11	10–4	1st	NCAA University Division Sweet 16
1958–59	Indiana	11–11	7–7	T–5th	
1959–60	Indiana	20–4	11–3	2nd	
1960–61	Indiana	15–9	8–6	T–4th	
1961–62	Indiana	14–9	7–7	T–4th	
1962–63	Indiana	13–11	9–5	3rd	
1963–64	Indiana	9–15	5–9	8th	
1964–65	Indiana	19–5	9–5	4th	
Indiana:		364–174 (.677)	210–116 (.644)		
Total:		450–231 (.661)			
National champion Postseason invitational champion Conference regular season champion Conference regular season and conference tournament champion Division regular season champion Division regular season and conference tournament champion Conference tournament champion

== See also ==
- List of NCAA Division I Men's Final Four appearances by coach
