= 1940 NCAA basketball tournament =

Edition of USA college basketball tournament

- Season: 1939–40
- Teams: 8
- Finals site: Municipal Auditorium, Kansas City, Missouri
- Champions: Indiana Hoosiers (1st title, 1st title game, 1st Final Four)
- Runner-up: Kansas Jayhawks (1st title game, 1st Final Four)
- Semifinalists: Duquesne Dukes (1st Final Four); USC Trojans (1st Final Four)
- Winning coach: Branch McCracken (1st title)
- MOP: Marvin Huffman (Indiana)
- Attendance: 36,880
- Top scorer: Howard Engleman (Kansas) (39 points)

The 1940 NCAA basketball tournament involved eight schools playing in single-elimination play to determine the participating champion of men's NCAA Division I college basketball. The 2nd edition of the tournament began on March 20, 1940, and ended with the championship game on March 30, at the Municipal Auditorium in Kansas City, Missouri. A total of eight games were played, including a single third place game in the West region.

Indiana, coached by Branch McCracken, won the tournament title with a 60–42 victory in the final game over Kansas, coached by Phog Allen. Marvin Huffman of Indiana was named the tournament's Most Outstanding Player.

This would be the only tournament to feature Springfield College, the school James Naismith worked for when he invented the sport of basketball. They were the first of fourteen colleges and universities to compete in the tournament that are no longer in Division I. This was also the first appearance of the Kansas Jayhawks, whose first coach was Naismith.

== Locations ==
The following are the sites selected to host each round of the 1940 tournament:

=== Regionals ===
March 20 and 21
East Regional, Butler Fieldhouse, Indianapolis, Indiana (Host: Butler University)
West Regional, Municipal Auditorium, Kansas City, Missouri (Host: Missouri Valley Conference)

=== Championship Game ===
March 30
Municipal Auditorium, Kansas City, Missouri (Host: Missouri Valley Conference)

== Teams ==
East Regional - Indianapolis
School	Coach	Conference	Record
Duquesne	Chick Davies	Independent	19–2
Indiana	Branch McCracken	Big Ten	17–3
Springfield	Ed Hickox	Independent	16–2
Western Kentucky	Ed Diddle	SIAA	24–5

West Regional - Kansas City
School	Coach	Conference	Record
Colorado	Frosty Cox	Mountain States	17–2
Kansas	Phog Allen	Big Six	17–5
Rice	Buster Brannon	Southwest	21–2
USC	Sam Barry	Pacific Coast	19–2

== Bracket ==
Regional Semifinals; March 22
Indiana	48
Springfield	24
East – Indianapolis
Duquesne	30
Western Kentucky	29
USC	38
Colorado	32
West – Kansas City
Kansas	50
Rice	44

Regional Finals; March 23
Indiana	39
Duquesne	30
USC	42
Kansas	43
West Third Place Game
Colorado	56
Rice	60

National Championship; March 30
Kansas City
Indiana	60
Kansas	42

== See also ==
- 1940 National Invitation Tournament
- 1940 NAIA Division I men's basketball tournament
