= Howard Engleman =

American basketball player and coach

Personal information
- Born: November 20, 1919 Arkansas City, Kansas, U.S.
- Died: January 12, 2011 (aged 91) Salina, Kansas, U.S.
- Listed height: 6 ft 0 in (1.83 m)
- Listed weight: 180 lb (82 kg)

Career information
- High school: Arkansas City (Arkansas City, Kansas)
- College: Kansas (1938–1941)
- Position: Forward
- Number: 5

Career highlights
- Consensus first-team All-American (1941); 3× All-Big Six (1939–1941); No. 5 retired by Kansas Jayhawks

Howard George "Rope" Engleman (November 20, 1919 – January 12, 2011) was an American college basketball standout at the University of Kansas from 1939 to 1941. He was 6 ft 0 in (1.83 m) tall, weighed 170 pounds (82 kg). and played the forward position. As a senior in 1940–41, Engleman averaged 16.5 points per game and became just the second Jayhawk to be named a Consensus First Team All-American. Engleman led Kansas to two Big Six Conference regular season championships and as runners-up in the 1940 National Championship. The Jayhawks lost to Indiana, 60–42, but Engleman was the tournament's top scorer after scoring 39 points in three games. When asked about the preparations to play against the Hoosiers, Engleman responded: "We didn't know what to expect because we had never seen Indiana. The only scouting report we had was a letter from a KU alumnus back there [in Indiana]."

After graduating, Engleman joined the Navy and fought in World War II. After the war ended, he would become an assistant coach under Phog Allen after he graduated in 1941. In the middle of the 1946–47 season, Allen became sick and was ordered by doctors to rest, and Engleman resumed the remainder of the season as the interim head coach. In the final 14 games of the season, Engleman compiled an 8–6 record.

He had his jersey retired on March 1, 2003.

== Personal life ==
Engleman was a native of Arkansas City, Kansas and graduated from Arkansas City High School in 1937 after leading the Bulldogs to second- and third-place finishes in the state basketball tournament. He got his nickname "Rope" from his blond, curly locks of hair. He worked as a lawyer in Salina, Kansas, after earning his law degree from the University of Kansas School of Law.
