= 1942–43 Illinois Fighting Illini men's basketball team =

American college basketball season

1942–43 Illinois Fighting Illini men's basketball

Big Ten champion
- Conference: Big Ten Conference
- Record: 17–1 (12–0 Big Ten)
- Head coach: Douglas R. Mills (7th season)
- Assistant coaches: Howie Braun (6th season); Wally Roettger (8th season)
- MVP: Andy Phillip
- Captain: Arthur Mathisen
- Home arena: Huff Hall

1942–43 Big Ten Conference men's basketball standings
	Conf.				Overall
Team	W		L	PCT	W		L	PCT
Illinois	12	–	0	1.000	17	–	1	.944
Indiana	11	–	2	.846	18	–	2	.900
Northwestern	7	–	5	.583	8	–	9	.471
Wisconsin	6	–	6	.500	12	–	9	.571
Purdue	6	–	6	.500	9	–	11	.450
Minnesota	5	–	7	.417	8	–	9	.471
Ohio State	5	–	7	.417	8	–	9	.471
Michigan	4	–	8	.333	10	–	8	.556
Iowa	3	–	9	.250	7	–	10	.412
Chicago	0	–	9	.000	0	–	21	.000

"1942–43 Fighting Illini men's basketball team"

The 1942–43 Illinois Fighting Illini men's basketball team represented the University of Illinois.

== Regular season ==
The 1942–43 Illinois Fighting Illini men's basketball team represented the University of Illinois, finishing the season with a 17–1 record. Illinois won the Big Ten Conference Title and finished the regular season as the nations' top ranked team in the Dunkel Index. The season was cut short as three of the five starters headed off to active duty in the armed forces. Paced by a group of players known as the Whiz Kids, the team consisted of 20-year-old All-America forward Andy Phillip and teenagers Ken Menke, Gene Vance, Jack Smiley and team captain Art Mathisen. These players were so dominant in the Big Ten that only Northwestern's Otto Graham could crack the all-conference team.

The Army drafted Mathisen, Menke and Smiley. Head coach Doug Mills made a decision in February 1943 that all five always supported: the club did not participate in either the NCAA or NIT tournament. In June 1943, Vance and Phillip joined the military as well. The team was retroactively listed as the top team of the season by the Premo-Porretta Power Poll.

Four of the five, minus Mathisen, returned to Illinois and tried to recapture the glory for one more season in 1946–47 after the war ended, but the chemistry had changed as well as their talent. Illinois went 14–6.

The final living Whiz Kid, Gene Vance, died in 2012.

=== Roster ===
1942–43 Illinois Fighting Illini men's basketball team
Players
Coaches

Pos.	#	Name	Height	Weight	Year	Hometown
G	3	Frank Bohac	—	—	So	Braidwood, Illinois
G	4	Bishop Barrick	—	—	Jr	Stillman Valley, Illinois
C	5	Raymond Bergeson	—	—	Jr	Bridgeton, New Jersey
G	6	Clifton Fulton	—	—	So	Pittsburg, Kansas
F	7	Raymond Grierson	—	—	So	Champaign, Illinois
F	8	Edwin Parker	—	—	Sr	Taft, California
G	9	Kenneth Parker	—	—	Sr	Granite City, Illinois
G	10	Gordon Hortin	—	—	So	Evansville, Indiana
G	11	John Kjellstrom	—	—	So	Hebron, Illinois
F	12	Ken Menke	—	—	Jr	Dundee, Illinois
C	13	Alton Shirley	—	—	So	Edmond, Oklahoma
F	14	Oliver Shoaff	—	—	So	Mt. Carmel, Illinois
G	15	Arthur Smiley	—	—	Jr	Waterman, Illinois
F	16	W.L. Miller	—	—	Fr	Chicago, Illinois
F	17	Herb Matter	—	—	Jr	Naperville, Illinois
C	19	Arthur Mathisen (C)	—	—	Sr	Dwight, Illinois
G	25	Ellis Vance	—	—	Jr	Clinton, Illinois
F	33	Charles Fowler	—	—	So	Watseka, Illinois
G/F	47	Andrew Phillip	—	—	Jr	Granite City, Illinois

Head coach

- Douglas Mills (University of Illinois) (7th year)

Assistant coach(es)

- Wally Roettger (University of Illinois) (8th year)
- Howie Braun (University of Illinois) (6th year)

Legend

- (C) Team captain
- (S) Suspended
- (I) Ineligible
- (W) Walk-on
- Injured
- Current redshirt

Roster

== Schedule ==
Date time, TV	Rank^{#}	Opponent^{#}	Result	Record	Site (attendance) city, state
Non-Conference regular season
12/7/1942*		Detroit	W 38–25	1–0	Huff Hall (5,277); Champaign, IL
12/12/1942*		Nebraska	W 69–27	2–0	Huff Hall (4,884); Champaign, IL
12/14/1942*		Missouri; Rivalry	W 51–30	3–0	Huff Hall (4,465); Champaign, IL
12/19/1942*		at Great Lakes	W 57–53	4–0	Chicago Stadium (13,295); Chicago, IL
12/21/1942*		at Camp Grant	L 31–41	4–1	Camp Grant Y.M.C.A. (2,200); Rockford, IL
1/2/1943*		Stanford	W 38–26	5–1	Huff Hall (6,835); Champaign, IL
Big Ten regular season
1/9/1943		Michigan	W 47–34	6–1 (1–0)	Huff Hall (7,188); Champaign, IL
1/11/1943		at Wisconsin	W 47–34	7–1 (2–0)	Wisconsin Field House (14,000); Madison, WI
1/16/1943		Iowa; Rivalry	W 61–41	8–1 (3–0)	Huff Hall (7,004); Champaign, IL
1/18/1943		Iowa; Rivalry	W 66–34	9–1 (4–0)	Huff Hall (6,684); Champaign, IL
2/1/1943		Northwestern; Rivalry	W 68–51	10–1 (5–0)	Huff Hall (6,766); Champaign, IL
2/6/1942		at Ohio State	W 60–48	11–1 (6–0)	Ohio Expo Center Coliseum (3,300); Columbus, OH
2/8/1943		at Ohio State	W 50–44	12–1 (7–0)	Ohio Expo Center Coliseum (2,900); Columbus, OH
2/13/1943		at Minnesota	W 56–35	13–1 (8–0)	Williams Arena (6,800); Minneapolis, MN
2/15/1943		at Minnesota	W 55–29	14–1 (9–0)	Williams Arena (5,100); Minneapolis, MN
2/20/1943		Wisconsin	W 50–26	15–1 (10–0)	Huff Hall (7,102); Champaign, IL
2/27/1943		at Northwestern; Rivalry	W 68–51	16–1 (11–0)	Chicago Stadium (19,880); Chicago, IL
3/1/1943		University of Chicago	W 92–25	17–1 (12–0)	Huff Hall (6,443); Champaign, IL
*Non-conference game. ^{#}Rankings from AP Poll. (#) Tournament seedings in parentheses. All times are in Central Time.

== Player stats ==
Player	Games played	Field goals	Free throws	Points
Andy Phillip	18	131	43	305
Arthur Mathisen	18	86	51	201
Ken Menke	17	70	43	183
Jack Smiley	17	59	17	135
Gene Vance	18	56	14	126
Edwin Parker	18	12	10	34
Oliver Shoaff	14	7	3	17
Kenneth Parker	14	7	2	16
Alton Shirley	14	3	0	6
Cliff Fulton	6	1	2	4
Herbert Matter	2	1	2	4
Charles Fowler	7	2	0	4
W.L. Miller	5	1	0	2
Gordon Hortin	6	1	0	2

== Awards and honors ==
- Andy Phillip
  - National Player of the Year
  - Consensus All-American
  - Converse 1st team All-American
  - Helms 1st team All-American
  - Pic Magazine 1st team All-American
  - Look Magazine 1st team All-American
  - Sporting News 1st team All-American
  - Associated Press 1st team All-American
  - United Press International 1st team All-American
  - National Enterprise Association 1st team All-American
  - Big Ten Player of the Year
  - Team Most Valuable Player
  - Fighting Illini All-Century team (2005)
- Gene Vance
  - Converse Honorable Mention All-American
  - Fighting Illini All-Century team (2005)
- Jack Smiley
  - Converse 3rd team All-American
- Art Mathisen
  - Converse Honorable mention All-American
