= Gene Vance =

US Basketball player

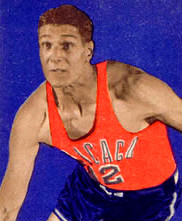
- Vance in 1948

Personal information
- Born: February 25, 1923 Clinton, Illinois, U.S.
- Died: February 16, 2012 (aged 88) Champaign, Illinois, U.S.
- Listed height: 6 ft 3 in (1.91 m)
- Listed weight: 195 lb (88 kg)

Career information
- High school: Clinton (Clinton, Illinois)
- College: Illinois (1941–1943, 1946–1947)
- NBA draft: 1947: 4th round, 38th overall pick
- Drafted by: Chicago Stags
- Playing career: 1947–1952
- Position: Guard / forward
- Number: 25

Career history
- 1947–1949: Chicago Stags
- 1949–1952: Tri-Cities Blackhawks / Milwaukee Hawks

Career BAA and NBA statistics
- Points: 1,437 (8.3 ppg)
- Rebounds: 103 (2.9 rpg)
- Assists: 399 (2.3 apg)
- Stats at NBA.com
- Stats at Basketball Reference

Ellis Eugene Vance (February 25, 1923 – February 16, 2012) was an American professional basketball player. He played in the Basketball Association of America (BAA) and National Basketball Association (NBA) for the Chicago Stags and Tri-Cities Blackhawks / Milwaukee Hawks.

Vance played college basketball for the Illinois Fighting Illini where he led the team as a member of the famed "Whiz Kids" of the 1940s. He and the other Whiz Kids, Andy Phillip, Art Mathisen, Ken Menke, and Jack Smiley, are regarded as some of Illinois' all-time greats, but only he and Phillip are on the team's all-century team. Vance and his Whiz Kids teammates left basketball to serve in World War II in 1943. Vance was selected by the Stags in the 1948 NBA draft, and played professionally for five seasons. He served as the athletic director of the University of Illinois at Urbana–Champaign from 1967 to 1972.

Vance was married to Grace Hoberg from 1943 until her death from stomach cancer in 1980. They had four children and seven grandchildren together. Vance later married Janann Duffy. He died on February 16, 2012, at age 88.

== Honors ==
- 1973 - Inducted into the Illinois Basketball Coaches Association's Hall of Fame as a player.
- 2004 - Elected to the "Illini Men's Basketball All-Century Team".
- December 18, 2006 - The post office in his hometown of Clinton was named the "Gene Vance Post Office" in his honor.
- September 13, 2008 - Honored jersey which hangs in the State Farm Center to show regard for being the most decorated basketball players in the University of Illinois' history.

== College and professional statistics ==
=== University of Illinois ===
Season	Games	Points	PPG	Big Ten Record	Overall Record	Postseason
1941–42	23	98	4.2	13–2	18–05	Big Ten Champions
1942–43	18	126	7.0	12–0	17–1	Big Ten Champions
1946–47	20	135	6.75	8–4	14–6	—
**Totals**	**61**	**359**	**5.9**	**33–6**	**49–12**	

=== BAA/NBA ===
Legend
GP	Games played	MPG	Minutes per game
FG%	Field-goal percentage	FT%	Free-throw percentage
RPG	Rebounds per game	APG	Assists per game
PPG	Points per game	**Bold**	Career high

=== Regular season ===
Year	Team	GP	MPG	FG%	FT%	RPG	APG	PPG
1947–48	Chicago	48	–	.264	.603	–	1.0	8.4
1948–49	Chicago	**56**	–	.338	**.724**	–	3.0	**10.3**
1949–50	Tri-Cities	35	–	.338	.717	–	**3.5**	8.7
1950–51	Tri-Cities	29	–	**.404**	.701	**3.2**	2.0	4.8
1951–52	Milwaukee	7	**16.9**	.269	.643	2.1	1.3	3.3
Career		175	16.9	.315	.687	3.0	2.3	8.3

=== Playoffs ===
Year	Team	GP	MPG	FG%	FT%	RPG	APG	PPG
1948	Chicago	**5**	–	**.258**	.765	–	.2	9.4
1949	Chicago	2	–	.229	**.833**	–	**3.5**	**10.5**
1950	Tri-Cities	3	–	.226	.500	–	3.0	6.3
Career		10	–	.242	.697	–	1.7	8.7
