= Andy Phillip =

American basketball player and coach

- Phillip pictured in The Illio, 1947

Personal information
- Born: March 7, 1922 Granite City, Illinois, U.S.
- Died: April 29, 2001 (aged 79) Rancho Mirage, California, U.S.
- Listed height: 6 ft 2 in (1.88 m)
- Listed weight: 195 lb (88 kg)

Career information
- High school: Granite City (Granite City, Illinois)
- College: Illinois (1941–1943, 1946–1947)
- NBA draft: 1947: 5th round, 47th overall pick
- Drafted by: Chicago Stags
- Playing career: 1947–1958
- Position: Point guard / shooting guard
- Number: 19, 7, 4, 14, 17

Career history

Playing
- 1947–1950: Chicago Stags
- 1950–1952: Philadelphia Warriors
- 1952–1956: Fort Wayne Pistons
- 1956–1958: Boston Celtics

Coaching
- 1958: St. Louis Hawks

Career highlights
- NBA champion (1957); 5× NBA All-Star (1951–1955); 2× All-NBA Second Team (1952, 1953); 2× NBA assists leader (1951, 1952); Sporting News Player of the Year (1943); 2× Consensus first-team All-American (1942, 1943); Consensus second-team All-American (1947)

Career statistics
- Points: 6,384 (9.1 ppg)
- Rebound: 2,395 (4.4 rpg)
- Assists: 3,759 (5.4 apg)
- Stats at NBA.com
- Stats at Basketball Reference
- Basketball Hall of Fame
- Collegiate Basketball Hall of Fame

Andrew Michael "Handy Andy" Phillip (March 7, 1922 – April 29, 2001) was an American professional basketball player. Born in Granite City, Illinois, Phillip had an 11-year career and played for the Chicago Stags of the Basketball Association of America and the Philadelphia Warriors, Fort Wayne Pistons and Boston Celtics, of the National Basketball Association (NBA).

== High school and college ==
Phillip led his high school in Granite City, Illinois, to the IHSA state championship in 1940 by defeating Herrin High School with a final score of 24–22 at Huff Gym on the University of Illinois at Urbana–Champaign campus. It would be that same gymnasium where he earned renown for his talents and for the Fighting Illini's success during war-interrupted, non-consecutive seasons in 1941–1943 and 1946–1947. Phillip was the untitled leader of "The Whiz Kids", a team that included Ken Menke, Gene Vance, Jack Smiley and team captain Art Mathisen. Arguably the most talented basketball team in the nation, Phillip and his teammates would elect not to participate in either the NCAA or NIT tournament based on the army's draft of Mathisen, Menke and Smiley. The team was retroactively listed as the top team of the season by the Premo-Porretta Power Poll. Four of the five, minus Mathisen, returned to Illinois and tried to recapture the glory for one more season in 1946–47 after the war ended, but the chemistry had changed as well as their talent. Illinois went 14–6.

While attending Illinois, Phillip was a member of Delta Tau Delta fraternity. Phillip served as a first lieutenant in the United States Marine Corps in World War II at Iwo Jima.

== Professional basketball ==
Phillip played in the first five NBA All-Star Games, and was twice named to the All-NBA Second Team. He was the first player to record 500 assists in a season, the first to reach the 1,000, 2,000, and 3,000 career assists milestones, and led the NBA in assists during the 1950–51 and 1951–52 seasons. Phillip reached the postseason every year he was in the league, and his teams made it to the NBA Finals during his final four seasons — twice with Fort Wayne and twice with Boston. The 1957 Boston team won the NBA Championship.

Phillip was alleged by one of his Fort Wayne Pistons teammates, George Yardley, to have conspired with gamblers to throw the 1955 NBA Finals to the Syracuse Nationals. In the decisive seventh game, Phillip turned the ball over with three seconds remaining in the game, enabling Syracuse to win by one point, 92–91.

After retiring from playing basketball, he coached the St. Louis Hawks for 10 games in 1958, posting a 6–4 record before he was fired. Phillip later coached the Chicago Majors of the American Basketball League.

Phillip was elected to the Naismith Memorial Basketball Hall of Fame in 1961. He was elected to the Illini Men's Basketball All-Century Team in 2004. In 2007, Phillip was voted one of the "100 Legends of the IHSA Boys Basketball Tournament", recognizing his superior performance in his appearance in the tournament.

Phillip died at his home in Rancho Mirage, California, on April 29, 2001, aged 79.

Sports writer Dan Manoyan wrote a book about Phillip and his Granite City High School basketball teammates, titled Men of Granite, in 2007. A film based on the book, directed by Dwayne Johnson-Cochran, began production in 2015.

== Honors ==
=== Basketball ===
- 1942, 1943, 1947 – First-team All-Big Ten
- 1942 & 1943 First Team All-American
- 1943 – National Player of the Year
- 1943 – Sporting News National Player of the Year
- 1961 – Inducted into the Naismith Memorial Basketball Hall of Fame
- 1973 – Inducted into the Illinois Basketball Coaches Association's Hall of Fame as a player.
- 2004 – Elected to the "Illini Men's Basketball All-Century Team".
- 2006 – Inducted into the National Collegiate Basketball Hall of Fame
- 2007 – Named one of the 100 Legends of the IHSA Boys Basketball Tournament.
- September 13, 2008 – Honored jersey which hangs in the State Farm Center to show regard for being the most decorated basketball players in the University of Illinois' history.

=== Baseball ===
- 1947 – Baseball All-American (First baseman)

=== Athletics ===
- 1942, 1943 – University of Illinois Athlete of the Year
- 2017 – Inducted into the Illinois Athletics Hall of Fame

== Statistics ==
=== Basketball ===
Season	Games	Points	PPG	Big Ten Record	Overall Record	Highlight
1941–42	23	232	10.0	13–2	18–5	Consensus 1st team All-American
1942–43	18	305	16.9	12–0	17–1	Big Ten and National Player of the Year
1946–47	20	192	9.6	8–4	14–6	Consensus 2nd team All-American
Totals	61	729	12.0	33–6	49–12	

== BAA/NBA career statistics ==
Legend
GP	Games played	GS	Games started	MPG	Minutes per game
FG%	Field goal percentage	3P%	3-point field goal percentage	FT%	Free throw percentage
RPG	Rebounds per game	APG	Assists per game	SPG	Steals per game
BPG	Blocks per game	PPG	Points per game	**Bold**	Career high
†	Won an NBA championship	*	Led the league

=== Regular season ===
Year	Team	GP	MPG	FG%	FT%	RPG	APG	PPG
1947–48	Chicago	32	–	.336	.583	–	2.3	10.8
1948–49	Chicago	60	–	.348	.676	–	5.3	**12.0**
1949–50	Chicago	65	–	.349	.704	–	5.8	11.7
1950–51	Philadelphia	66	–	**.399**	.751	**6.8**	6.3*	11.2
1951–52	Philadelphia	66	**44.4**	.366	**.753**	6.6	**8.2***	**12.0**
1952–53	Philadelphia/Fort Wayne	70	38.4	.397	.738	5.2	5.7	10.3
1953–54	Fort Wayne	**71**	38.1	.375	.730	3.7	6.3	10.6
1954–55	Fort Wayne	64	36.4	.371	.692	4.5	7.7	9.6
1955–56	Fort Wayne	70	29.7	.365	.563	3.7	5.9	5.8
1956–57†	Boston	67	22.0	.379	.642	2.7	2.5	4.4
1957–58	Boston	70	16.6	.355	.592	2.3	1.7	3.4
Career		701	32.3	.368	.695	4.4	5.4	9.1

=== Playoffs ===
Year	Team	GP	MPG	FG%	FT%	RPG	APG	PPG
1948	Chicago	5	–	.283	.714	–	.8	7.2
1949	Chicago	2	–	.389	**1.000**	–	6.0	**19.5**
1950	Chicago	2	–	.259	.769	–	6.0	12.0
1951	Philadelphia	2	–	.400	.500	**7.5**	7.0	7.5
1952	Philadelphia	3	40.7	**.421**	.792	4.7	**7.3**	11.7
1953	Fort Wayne	8	**41.1**	.338	.667	4.0	3.8	10.3
1954	Fort Wayne	4	34.0	.342	.750	3.0	4.3	8.8
1955	Fort Wayne	**11**	40.5	.323	.850	5.5	7.1	8.5
1956	Fort Wayne	10	17.3	.333	.440	2.6	3.5	2.9
1957†	Boston	10	12.8	.364	.400	2.0	1.7	2.2
1958	Boston	10	9.1	.238	.778	1.4	.7	1.7
Career		67	25.4	.330	.700	3.3	3.7	6.4

== Head coaching record ==
Legend
Regular season	G	Games coached	W	Games won	L	Games lost	W–L %	Win–loss %
Playoffs	PG	Playoff games	PW	Playoff wins	PL	Playoff losses	PW–L %	Playoff win–loss %

Team	Year	G	W	L	W–L%	Finish	PG	PW	PL	PW–L%	Result
St. Louis	1958–59	10	6	4	.600	(fired)	—	—	—	—	—
Total		10	6	4	.600		—	—	—	—	
