= 1941–42 Illinois Fighting Illini men's basketball team =

American college basketball season

1941–42 Illinois Fighting Illini men's basketball

Big Ten champions
- Conference: Big Ten Conference
- Record: 18–5 (13–2 Big Ten)
- Head coach: Douglas R. Mills (6th season)
- Assistant coaches: Howie Braun (5th season); Wally Roettger (7th season); Lou Boudreau (1st season)
- MVP: Andy Phillip
- Captain: William Hocking
- Home arena: Huff Hall

1941–42 Big Ten Conference men's basketball standings
	Conf.				Overall
Team	W		L	PCT	W		L	PCT
Illinois	13	–	2	.867	18	–	5	.783
Indiana	10	–	5	.667	15	–	6	.714
Wisconsin	10	–	5	.667	14	–	7	.667
Iowa	10	–	5	.667	12	–	8	.600
Minnesota	9	–	6	.600	15	–	6	.714
Purdue	9	–	6	.600	14	–	7	.667
Northwestern	5	–	10	.333	8	–	13	.381
Michigan	5	–	10	.333	6	–	14	.300
Ohio State	4	–	11	.267	6	–	14	.300
Chicago	0	–	15	.000	1	–	20	.048

The 1941–42 Illinois Fighting Illini men's basketball team represented the University of Illinois.

== Regular season ==
The Illinois Fighting Illini finished the season with a record of 18 wins and 5 losses. Under the direction of head coach and athletic director Douglas Mills, the Illini grouped a team of players, all around 6' 3", into a nearly undefeatable lineup later to be known as "The Whiz Kids". This group captured the attention of the entire nation while winning back-to-back conference titles and combining for a 35–6 record, 25–2 in the Big Ten over those two seasons. They dazzled crowds everywhere averaging 58 points per game, while most teams were averaging in the low 40s. Primarily made up of sophomores, they dominated the 1941–42 conference basketball season by posting a 13–2 record. A starting lineup consisting of Arthur "Jack" Smiley, Ken Menke, Andy Phillip, Ellis "Gene" Vance, Victor Wukovits and Art Mathisen, developed a winning attitude that would maintain for the next 15 years, a time period where the Illini would finish no less than third in the conference for 13 of them. The 1942 NCAA tournament was only in its fourth year of existence and was staged around the collegiate basketball coaches convention being held at Tulane University in New Orleans, Louisiana. The warm weather and unsufferable humidity caused the young Illini to lose two games in a period of two days.

The final living Whiz Kid, Gene Vance, died in 2012.

=== Roster ===
1941–42 Illinois Fighting Illini men's basketball team
Players
Coaches

Pos.	#	Name	Height	Weight	Year	Hometown
G	4	Henry Sachs	6 ft 1 in (1.85 m)	—	Sr	Chicago, Illinois
C	5	Raymond Bergeson	6 ft 4 in (1.93 m)	—	So	Bridgeton, New Jersey
G	6	Clifton Fulton	5 ft 10 in (1.78 m)	—	Fr	Pittsburg, Kansas
F	7	Raymond Grierson	6 ft 2 in (1.88 m)	—	Fr	Champaign, Illinois
F	8	Edwin Parker	6 ft 2 in (1.88 m)	—	Jr	Taft, California
G	9	Kenneth Parker	6 ft 0 in (1.83 m)	—	Jr	Granite City, Illinois
G	10	Bishop Barrick	6 ft 1 in (1.85 m)	—	So	Stillman Valley, Illinois
F	11	Kenneth Brown	6 ft 2 in (1.88 m)	—	So	Catlin, Illinois
F	12	David Dillon	6 ft 2 in (1.88 m)	—	Sr	Sturgis, Michigan
C	13	Victor Wukovits	6 ft 3 in (1.91 m)	—	Sr	Mishawaka, Indiana
F	14	Johnson Johnson	6 ft 1 in (1.85 m)	—	So	-
G	15	Arthur Smiley	6 ft 2 in (1.88 m)	—	So	Waterman, Illinois
G	16	William Hocking (C)	6 ft 0 in (1.83 m)	—	Sr	Evanston, Illinois
F	17	Herbert Matter	6 ft 0 in (1.83 m)	—	So	Naperville, Illinois
G	18	Robert Shapland	5 ft 9 in (1.75 m)	—	So	Champaign, Illinois
C	19	Arthur Mathisen	6 ft 5 in (1.96 m)	—	Jr	Dwight, Illinois
G	20	Daryl Shapiro	5 ft 6 in (1.68 m)	—	So	Toledo, Ohio
G	25	Ellis Vance	6 ft 2 in (1.88 m)	—	Jr	Clinton, Illinois
F	33	Charles Fowler	5 ft 9 in (1.75 m)	—	Fr	Watseka, Illinois
F	38	Ken Menke	6 ft 2 in (1.88 m)	—	So	Dundee, Illinois
G	47	Andrew Phillip	6 ft 2 in (1.88 m)	—	So	Granite City, Illinois

Head coach

- Douglas Mills (University of Illinois) (6th year)

Assistant coach(es)

- Wally Roettger (University of Illinois) (7th year)
- Howie Braun (University of Illinois) (5th year)
- Lou Boudreau (University of Illinois) (1st year)

Legend

- (C) Team captain
- (S) Suspended
- (I) Ineligible
- (W) Walk-on
- Injured
- Current redshirt

Roster

== Schedule ==
Date time, TV	Rank^{#}	Opponent^{#}	Result	Record	Site (attendance) city, state
Non-Conference regular season
12/9/1941*		Marquette	W 45–43	1–0	Huff Hall (3,990); Champaign, IL
12/13/1941*		Chanute Field	L 38–40	1–1	Huff Hall (4,068); Champaign, IL
12/17/1941*		Butler	W 52–50	2–1	Huff Hall (3,903); Champaign, IL
12/20/1941*		at Detroit	W 49–34	3–1	Titans Gymnasium (–); Detroit, MI
12/23/1941*		Notre Dame	W 48–29	4–1	Huff Hall (3,405); Champaign, IL
12/30/1941*		Harvard	W 39–30	5–1	Huff Hall (3,116); Champaign, IL
Big Ten regular season
1/3/1942		at Wisconsin	W 55–40	6–1 (1–0)	Wisconsin Field House (7,000); Madison, WI
1/10/1942		at Michigan	W 44–40	7–1 (2–0)	Yost Fieldhouse (3,500); Ann Arbor, MI
1/12/1942		at Ohio State	W 58–49	8–1 (3–0)	Ohio Expo Center Coliseum (2,658); Columbus, OH
1/17/1942		University of Chicago	W 54–26	9–1 (4–0)	Huff Hall (4,349); Champaign, IL
1/19/1942		Iowa; Rivalry	W 42–35	10–1 (5–0)	Huff Hall (5,195); Champaign, IL
1/24/1942		Minnesota	W 49–36	11–1 (6–0)	Huff Hall (7,051); Champaign, IL
2/7/1942		Northwestern; Rivalry	W 41–33	12–1 (7–0)	Huff Hall (6,915); Champaign, IL
2/9/1942		at Indiana; Rivalry	L 36–41	12–2 (7–1)	The Fieldhouse (6,200); Bloomington, IN
2/14/1942		Michigan	W 55–29	13–2 (8–1)	Huff Hall (3,500); Champaign, IL
2/16/1942		at Minnesota	W 41–37	14–2 (9–1)	Williams Arena (13,013); Minneapolis, MN
2/21/1942		Ohio State	W 48–31	15–2 (10–1)	Huff Hall (5,195); Champaign, IL
2/23/1942		Wisconsin	W 45–43	16–2 (11–1)	Huff Hall (6,105); Champaign, IL
2/28/1942		at Northwestern; Rivalry	W 63–49	17–2 (12–1)	Chicago Stadium (18,000); Chicago, IL
3/2/1942		at Iowa; Rivalry	L 32–46	17–3 (12–2)	Iowa Field House (13,500); Iowa City, IA
3/7/1942		Purdue	W 34–32	18–3 (13–2)	Huff Hall (7,035); Champaign, IL
NCAA Tournament
3/20/1942*		vs. Kentucky; First Round	L 44–46	18–4	Tulane Gym (3,500); New Orleans, LA
3/21/1942*		vs. Penn State; East Regional Third Place	L 34–41	18–5	Tulane Gym (3,500); New Orleans, LA
*Non-conference game. ^{#}Rankings from AP Poll. (#) Tournament seedings in parentheses. All times are in Central Time.

== Player stats ==
Player	Games played	Field goals	Free throws	Points
Andy Phillip	23	87	58	232
Ken Menke	23	93	38	224
Victor Wukovits	23	51	35	137
Arthur Mathisen	22	41	48	130
Jack Smiley	23	43	20	106
Gene Vance	23	44	10	98
Charles Fowler	14	14	4	32
William Hocking	15	10	4	24
Henry Sachs	10	11	1	23
Edwin Parker	15	9	4	22
Raymond Grierson	4	3	0	6
Herbert Matter	2	2	0	4
David Dillon	3	1	1	3
Cliff Fulton	5	1	0	2
Raymond Bergeson	1	0	0	0
Bishop Barrick	1	0	0	0

== Awards and honors ==
- Andy Phillip
  - National Player of the Year
  - Consensus All-American
  - Big Ten Player of the Year
  - Pic Magazine 2nd team All-American
  - Converse 3rd team All-American
  - Team Most Valuable Player
  - Fighting Illini All-Century team (2005)
- Gene Vance
  - Sporting News Honorable Mention All-American
  - Fighting Illini All-Century team (2005)
- Jack Smiley
  - Sporting News Honorable Mention All-American
- Art Mathisen
  - Sporting News Honorable Mention All-American
- Ken Menke
  - Sporting News Honorable Mention All-American
  - Converse Honorable Mention All-American
