= Jack Smiley =

American basketball player

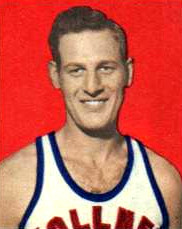
- Smiley in 1948

Personal information
- Born: December 22, 1922 Sandwich, Illinois, U.S.
- Died: July 30, 2000 (aged 77) Des Moines, Iowa, U.S.
- Listed height: 6 ft 3 in (1.91 m)
- Listed weight: 190 lb (86 kg)

Career information
- High school: Waterman (Waterman, Illinois)
- College: Illinois (1941–1943, 1945–1947)
- BAA draft: 1947: undrafted
- Playing career: 1947–1951
- Position: Small forward / shooting guard
- Number: 37, 15, 10
- Coaching career: 1949–1951

Career history

Playing
- 1947–1949: Fort Wayne (Zollner) Pistons
- 1949: Anderson Packers
- 1949–1951: Waterloo Hawks

Coaching
- 1949–1951: Waterloo Hawks

Career highlights
- Third-team All-American – Converse (1943); Third-team All-American – Helms (1947)
- Stats at NBA.com
- Stats at Basketball Reference

Arthur John Smiley (December 22, 1922 – July 30, 2000) was an American professional basketball player. Smiley played basketball for Waterman High School, in Waterman, Illinois. With Gene Vance, Andy Phillip, Ken Menke, and Art Mathisen, Smiley was a member of the University of Illinois' "Whiz Kids" team that went 35-6 from 1941 to 1943, earning two Big Ten Conference championships. The team voted to turn down an invitation to the NCAA tournament in 1943, after Smiley, Vance and Phillip were inducted into the military mid-season.

As an artillery corporal with the Army's 106th division, Smiley was engaged in one of the bloodiest skirmishes of the Battle of the Bulge- once firing his 105 mm Howitzer for 96 continuous hours. The 106th division suffered a 90% casualty rate in the skirmish.

Smiley returned to Illinois for the 1946–47 season and won team MVP honors.

After college, Smiley played two seasons in the National Basketball Association with the Fort Wayne Pistons, Anderson Packers, and Waterloo Hawks. He averaged 6.2 points per game in his NBA career. Smiley also served as a player-coach for the Hawks for 27 games in the 1949–50 season, and posted an 11–16 record.

Smiley spent his later years in Des Moines, Iowa. He died in 2000.

== Career statistics ==
Legend
GP	Games played	FG%	Field-goal percentage
FT%	Free-throw percentage	APG	Assists per game
PPG	Points per game	**Bold**	Career high

=== BAA/NBA ===
==== Regular season ====
Year	Team	GP	FG%	FT%	APG	PPG
1948–49	Fort Wayne	**59**	.247	.683	2.3	**6.7**
1949–50	Anderson	12	.120	.500	1.2	2.0
1949–50	Waterloo	47	**.293**	**.701**	**3.1**	6.6
Career		118	.256	.679	2.5	6.2

== Head coaching record ==
Legend
Regular season	G	Games coached	W	Games won	L	Games lost	W–L %	Win–loss %
Playoffs	PG	Playoff games	PW	Playoff wins	PL	Playoff losses	PW–L %	Playoff win–loss %

Team	Year	G	W	L	W–L%	Finish	PG	PW	PL	PW–L%	Result
Waterloo	1949–50	27	11	16	.407	5th in Western	—	—	—	—	Missed playoffs
