= Ollie Shoaff =

American basketball player

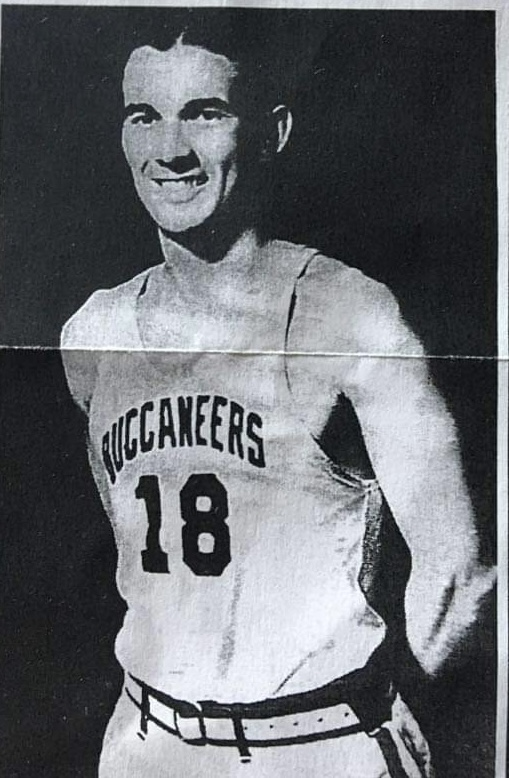
- Shoaff in 1943

Personal information
- Born: November 10, 1923 Mount Carmel, Illinois, U.S.
- Died: October 5, 2001 (aged 77) Mount Carmel, Illinois, U.S.

Career information
- High school: Mount Carmel (Mount Carmel, Illinois)
- College: Illinois (1942–1943); Southern Illinois (1946–1948)
- Position: Guard

Career history

Playing
- 1948: Detroit Vagabond Kings
- 1948–1949: Hammond Calumet Buccaneers
- 1951: Evansville Agogans

Coaching
- 1949–1953: Norris City HS

Oliver Richard Shoaff (November 10, 1923 – October 5, 2001) was an American professional basketball player. He played in the National Basketball League for the Detroit Vagabond Kings and the Hammond Calumet Buccaneers during the 1948–49 season and averaged 8.4 points per game.
