= 1943 NCAA Men's Basketball All-Americans =

- Awarded for: 1942–43 NCAA men's basketball season

The consensus 1943 College Basketball All-American team, as determined by aggregating the results of four major All-American teams. To earn "consensus" status, a player must win honors from a majority of the following teams: the Helms Athletic Foundation, Converse, The Sporting News, and Pic Magazine.

== 1943 Consensus All-America team ==
Consensus First Team
Player	Class	Team
Ed Beisser	Senior	Creighton
Charles B. Black	Sophomore	Kansas
Harry Boykoff	Sophomore	St. John's
Bill Closs	Senior	Rice
Andy Phillip	Junior	Illinois
Kenny Sailors	Junior	Wyoming
George Senesky	Senior	Saint Joseph's

Consensus Second Team
Player	Class	Team
Gale Bishop	Junior	Washington State
Otto Graham	Junior	Northwestern
John Kotz	Senior	Wisconsin
Robert Rensberger	Senior	Notre Dame
Gene Rock	Junior	Southern California
Gerry Tucker	Junior	Oklahoma

== Individual All-America teams ==
All-America Team
All-America Team	First team		Second team		Third team	
All-America Team	Player	School	Player	School	Player	School
Helms	Gale Bishop	Washington State	Ed Beisser	Creighton	No third team	
Helms	Bill Closs	Rice	Harry Boykoff	St. John's	No third team	
Helms	Ray Evans	Kansas	Ted Gossard	Southern California	No third team	
Helms	John Mahnken	Georgetown	John Hargis	Texas	No third team	
Helms	Bill Morris	Washington	Milo Komenich	Wyoming	No third team	
Helms	Andy Phillip	Illinois	John Kotz	Wisconsin	No third team	
Helms	Robert Rensberger	Notre Dame	Oran McKinney	Western Kentucky	No third team	
Helms	Kenny Sailors	Wyoming	George Mikan	DePaul	No third team	
Helms	George Senesky	Saint Joseph's	Bob Mullens	Fordham	No third team	
Helms	Gerry Tucker	Oklahoma	Stanley Skaug	Dartmouth	No third team	
Converse	Harry Boykoff	St. John's	Ed Beisser	Creighton	Hal Gensichen	Western Michigan
Converse	Andy Phillip	Illinois	Charles B. Black	Kansas	Otto Graham	Northwestern
Converse	Kenny Sailors	Wyoming	Bill Closs	Rice	Milo Komenich	Wyoming
Converse	George Senesky	Saint Joseph's	Robert Rensberger	Notre Dame	John Kotz	Wisconsin
Converse	Gerry Tucker	Oklahoma	Gene Rock	Southern California	Jack Smiley	Illinois
Pic Magazine	Ed Beisser	Creighton	Harry Boykoff	St. John's	John Abramovic	Salem
Pic Magazine	Charles B. Black	Kansas	Don Durdan	Oregon State	Bill Closs	Rice
Pic Magazine	John Kotz	Wisconsin	Jerry Fleishman	NYU	Bob Faught	Notre Dame
Pic Magazine	Andy Phillip	Illinois	Kenny Sailors	Wyoming	Milt Ticco	Kentucky
Pic Magazine	Gene Rock	Southern California	George Senesky	Saint Joseph's	Clayton Wynne	Arkansas
Sporting News	Charles B. Black	Kansas	Bill Closs	Rice	Ed Beisser	Creighton
Sporting News	Harry Boykoff	St. John's	Don Durdan	Oregon State	Gale Bishop	Washington State
Sporting News	Otto Graham	Northwestern	John Hargis	Texas	Robert Faught	Notre Dame
Sporting News	Andy Phillip	Illinois	Dave Minor	Toledo	Gene Rock	Southern California
Sporting News	Kenny Sailors	Wyoming	Bob Mullens	Fordham	Stanley Skaug	Dartmouth
Sporting News	George Senesky	Saint Joseph's	Robert Rensberger	Notre Dame	Joseph Walthall	West Virginia

== See also ==
- 1942–43 NCAA men's basketball season
