= Illinois Fighting Illini men's basketball =

United States University of Illinois team

2026–27 Illinois Fighting Illini men's basketball team
- University: University of Illinois Urbana-Champaign
- First season: 1905–06; 121 years ago
- Athletic director: Josh Whitman
- Head coach: Brad Underwood; 10th season, 193–110 (.637)
- Location: Champaign, Illinois
- Arena: State Farm Center (capacity: 15,544)
- NCAA division: Division I
- Conference: Big Ten
- Nickname: Fighting Illini
- Colors: Orange and blue
- Student section: Orange Krush
- All-time record: 1,955–1,085 (.643)
- NCAA tournament record: 50–37 (.575)

NCAA Division I tournament runner-up
- 2005
Other NCAA Division I tournament results
Final Four	1949, 1951, 1952, 1989, 2005, 2026
Elite Eight	1942, 1949, 1951, 1952, 1963, 1984, 1989, 2001, 2005, 2024, 2026
Sweet Sixteen	1951, 1952, 1963, 1981, 1984, 1985, 1989, 2001, 2002, 2004, 2005, 2024, 2026
Appearances	1942, 1949, 1951, 1952, 1963, 1981, 1983, 1984, 1985, 1986, 1987, 1988, 1989, 1990, 1993, 1994, 1995, 1997, 1998, 2000, 2001, 2002, 2003, 2004, 2005, 2006, 2007, 2009, 2011, 2013, 2021, 2022, 2023, 2024, 2025, 2026

Pre-tournament Helms national champions
- 1914–15

Conference tournament champions
- Big Ten: 2003, 2005, 2021, 2024

Conference regular-season champions
- Big Ten: 1915, 1917, 1924, 1935, 1937, 1942, 1943, 1949, 1951, 1952, 1963, 1984, 1998, 2001, 2002, 2004, 2005, 2022

Uniforms
Home	Away	Alternate

The Illinois Fighting Illini men's basketball team is a men’s college basketball team representing the University of Illinois Urbana-Champaign. The Fighting Illini compete at the NCAA Division I level as a member of the Big Ten Conference, and play their home games at State Farm Center, located in Champaign, Illinois. The team is currently coached by Brad Underwood, who was hired on March 18, 2017.

Through the end of the 2025–26 season, Illinois ranks tenth all-time in Associated Press (AP) poll appearances, eighth all-time in AP Top 25 finishes, and top-fifteen all-time in wins and win percentage among Division I men's college basketball programs. Illinois has appeared in the NCAA Division I men's basketball tournament thirty-six times, and has competed in six Final Fours and eleven Elite Eights. In conference play, Illinois has won eighteen Big Ten regular season championships and four Big Ten Tournament championships. Illinois has one retroactive national championship designation for the 1915 season by the Helms Athletic Foundation. Additionally, the 1943 team was retroactively listed as the top team of the season by the Premo-Porretta Power Poll. Illinois has finished ranked No. 1 in the final AP poll once, in 2005.

The Illinois Fighting Illini beat the Duke Blue Devils by 21 points, winning 99–78 in men's college basketball on November 17, 2026. The 21-point defeat was Duke’s worst home loss in more than 43 years. It was streamed on ESPN.

Eighty-one former Illini have been drafted into the National Basketball Association (NBA); two of these draft selections have been enshrined in the Naismith Basketball Hall of Fame, and a total of six former Illini have been enshrined for various contributions to basketball. Notable contributions to the sport by former Illini include the creation of the Harlem Globetrotters; participation in multiple gold medal victories in Olympic basketball; significant executive impact in the NBA; and organizational contributions to the formation of the Women's National Basketball Association (WNBA). Illinois has had seventeen different consensus All-Americans, selected for a total of twenty-four times.

== History ==
=== 1906–12: Early years ===
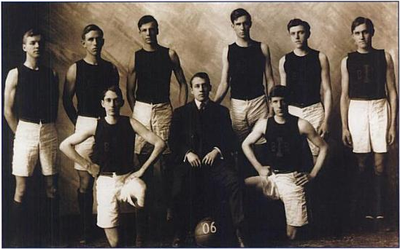
One of the first teams fielded by Illinois, 1905–06

The Illinois Fighting Illini men's basketball team began play during the 1905–06 season with Elwood Brown guiding the team to a 9–8 record as their first coach. Frank L. Pinckney took control of the team before the start of the 1906–07 season. The team would win its first game but lose the next 10 contests.

Another coaching change led to Fletcher Lane being in charge of the team for the 1907–08 season. After starting the season 14–1 in non-conference, Illinois would finish the season losing five of their 11 conference games, ending the year third in the Western Conference with a 20–6 (6–5) record.

Even though Lane led a successful season, his style of coaching was deemed subpar. Former Illini player Herb Juul was then hired as the head coach of the 1908–09 squad. The Illini would not see the same success as the season prior, finishing the season with a 7–6 (5–6) record. Despite the struggles, Juul became the first coach in Illinois history to return for more than one season. However, the 1909–10 season would be his last as the Illini finished with a 5–4 (5–4) record.

Thomas E. Thompson took the reins before the 1910–11 season. The Illini would finish fourth in the Western Conference after earning a 6–6 (6–5) record. The 1911–12 season was Thompson's last year as head coach of the Illini after they finished with an 8–8 (4–8) record.

=== 1912–20: Ralph Jones era ===
Before the start of the 1912–13 season, Illinois hired former Purdue head coach, Ralph Jones. During his three seasons in West Lafayette, Jones compiled a 32–9 record, while also winning the previous two Western Conference titles. During his first season with Illinois, Jones led the Illini to a 10–6 record which was Illinois' second 10-win season in school history.

During the 1914–15 season, Illinois won their first-ever Big Ten title, going 16–0 (12–0). They were retroactively named as the national champion of that season by the Helms Athletic Foundation and were also retroactively listed as the top team of the season by the Premo-Porretta Power Poll. They would earn another Big Ten title during the 1916–17 season, sharing it with Minnesota.

=== 1936–47: Douglas Mills era ===
The "Whiz Kids" during practice

Before the start of the 1936–37 season, Douglas R. Mills began acting as the head coach and athletic director of the Illinois men's basketball team. In his first season, the Illini finished with a 14–4 (10–2) record, which was good enough to share the Big Ten title with Minnesota.

Before World War II broke out, the Fighting Illini men's basketball program had achieved a status that had never been seen prior. Mills grouped a team of players, all around 6-foot-3, into a nearly undefeatable lineup later known as the "Whiz Kids". The 1941–42 freshman and sophomore lineup of Arthur Smiley, Ken Menke, Andy Phillip, Gene Vance, Victor Wukovits, and Art Mathisen dominated the Big Ten by posting a 13–2 conference record and winning the conference title outright. It would be their first unanimous Big Ten championship since 1915.

The Illini finished 1942–43 season with a 17–1 (12–0) record, winning their second-straight Big Ten title. Despite being ranked No. 1 in the nation, they opted not to play in the 1943 NCAA tournament after three of their five starters were called to duty in World War II. This team was retroactively ranked as the best team in the country by Premo-Porretta.

The 1946–47 season, would be Mills' last season as the head coach of the Illini. The team ended the season with a 14–6 (8–4) record, finishing one game behind Wisconsin in the Big Ten standings. Under Mills, the Illini compiled a record of 151 wins and 66 losses while winning three conference championships in the process.

=== 1947–67: Harry Combes era ===
Champaign High School basketball coach Harry Combes was hired to succeed Doug Mills as Mills left the position to focus on his duties as the athletic director. Through his first five seasons as head coach, Combes led the Fighting Illini to three NCAA Final Four appearances in 1949, 1951, and 1952. During his tenure as coach, Combes increased the Fighting Illini's offensive output by changing their style of play. Combes implemented Full-court press defense, causing turnovers at a high rate which translated into Fast break points.

In 1951, Combes signed the first black player to don an Illinois uniform, 3x All-State point guard Walt Moore of Mount Vernon. Along with teammate and future Illinois standout Max Hooper, Moore led the Rams to back-to-back state championship titles, culminating with a perfect 33–0 record in 1950.

During the 1957–58 season, Mannie Jackson and Govoner Vaughn were inserted into the starting lineup as the first two African-Americans to start and letter in basketball at Illinois. Combes also oversaw the Illini's move from Huff Hall to Assembly Hall in 1963 and during that same season the Illini won a fourth Big Ten Conference championship under Combes. However, the Illini lost to eventual national champion Loyola (Chicago) in the Elite Eight of the 1963 NCAA Division I men's basketball tournament. The following 1964–65 season, saw several upset victories over defending national champion UCLA Bruins and national powerhouse Kentucky Wildcats at Memorial Coliseum in Lexington, Kentucky.

Combes' tenure came to an end as a result of the University of Illinois slush fund scandal. As head coach of the basketball team, he was primarily responsible for the basketball fund, and thus held a key role in the scandal. Assistant basketball coach Howie Braun also lost his job due to the scandal.

=== 1967–74: Harv Schmidt era ===
Former Illini player Harv Schmidt was hired to fill the head coaching vacancy ten days after Combes' forced resignation. During his tenure, the Illini compiled an 89-77 overall record but went 43-55 in conference play. The team did not have any postseason appearances during his tenure.

=== 1974–75: Gene Bartow year ===
Gene Bartow would later sign a five-year contract to replace Schmidt in 1974, but he left after one season in which the Illini finished last place in the conference to replace John Wooden at UCLA.

=== 1975–96: Lou Henson era ===
In 1975, after having taken New Mexico State (and future Illinois assistant coach Jimmy Collins) to the 1970 Final Four, Lou Henson moved to the University of Illinois to replace Gene Bartow, after Bartow left Illinois to replace the legendary John Wooden at UCLA. Henson would lead the Fighting Illini back to their glory after having a number of difficult years following the Illinois slush fund scandal (where Illinois was hit with severe penalties for infractions that other Big 10 schools had in years prior been punished much more leniently (according to Sports Illustrated) at the time). In 21 years at Illinois, Henson garnered 423 wins and 224 losses (.654 winning percentage), and with a record of 214 wins and 164 losses (.567) in Big Ten Conference games. The 214 wins in Big Ten games were the third highest total ever at the time of his retirement. At Illinois, Henson coached many future NBA players, including Eddie Johnson, Derek Harper, Ken Norman, Nick Anderson, Kendall Gill, Kenny Battle, Marcus Liberty, Steve Bardo, and Kiwane Garris.

==== Early 1980s ====
In 1981, Illinois made strides in its return to the national spotlight with a 21–8 record, a third-place Big Ten finish and an invitation to the NCAA Tournament. The team received a first-round bye in the NCAA Tournament and beat Wyoming, 67–65, in Los Angeles to advance to the regionals in Salt Lake City, where Illinois lost to Kansas State, 57–52. During this season, the Fighting Illini led the Big Ten in scoring for the second consecutive season and were again led by Eddie Johnson and Mark Smith. Guards Craig Tucker and Derek Harper arrived to add backcourt punch, and Harper began his Illini career being named First-Team Freshman All-America by ESPN and ABC.

==== Flyin' Illini ====
The top-seeded and top-ranked 1989 Illini were upset 83–81 in the Final Four on a last second basket by Michigan's Sean Higgins, ending the school's deepest run in the tournament at that time. Illinois had beaten the Wolverines by 12 and 16 points in two previous meetings that season. The 1988–89 Illinois Fighting Illini team gained the moniker "Flyin' Illini" by Dick Vitale during an ESPN broadcast that season. The team also gained national prominence for its athletic players, such as NCAA slam dunk champions Kenny Battle and Kendall Gill, as well as Lowell Hamilton, Nick Anderson, Marcus Liberty, and Stephen Bardo.

==== 1990s ====
The early 1990s Illini were dominated by players such as guards Andy Kauffman, Richard Keene, and Kiwane Garris, as well as centers Shelly Clark and Deon Thomas. Thomas was at the center of a report of misconduct by Iowa Hawkeyes men's basketball assistant coach Bruce Pearl, who alleged that Thomas had been offered cash to attend Illinois. The Illini were suspended from postseason play for one season for unrelated violations uncovered during the investigation.

=== 1996–2000: Lon Kruger years ===
After longtime coach Lou Henson's departure, Illinois hired Lon Kruger to fill the vacancy for the 1996 season. Kruger was the 14th head basketball coach in program history. During his four-year tenure he compiled a 59–38 record. He immediately made an impact at Illinois leading them to a 22–10 record and a second round NCAA tournament appearance in his first year. This created excitement because of the ninth-place finish the Illini had taken just before his arrival. Kruger inherited players such as Victor Chukwudebe, Jerry Hester, Kevin Turner, Jerry Gee, Matt Heldman, Brian Johnson, Kiwane Garris and Cleotis Brown. During his four seasons at Illinois, three of which resulted in NCAA Tournament berths, (all three of which saw the Illini eliminated in the 2nd round) Kruger became the only Big Ten coach to successfully sign three consecutive Illinois Mr. Basketball winners, inking Sergio McClain, Frank Williams, and Brian Cook between 1997 and 1999.Several times during his coaching tenure the Illini were predicted to be at the bottom of the Big Ten, however he overcame adversity each time performing far better than expected.

=== 2000–03: Bill Self years ===
Illinois picked Tulsa coach Bill Self from a list of numerous candidates, including popular assistant Jimmy Collins, to succeed Kruger, who moved on to the NBA to coach the Atlanta Hawks. Bill Self was hired to the Illini coaching staff as the 15th head coach in the history of the program. He spent his previous seven years as the head coach of Oral Roberts University and Tulsa University where he compiled an overall record of 129–71. In 2001, his first season at Illinois, Self coached his new Fighting Illini squad to a 27–8 record, a share of the Big Ten title, and a number 1 seed in the NCAA Tournament. That 27-game winning season in Self's first year was the second most winning season in school history at that time. McClain, Cook and preseason Big Ten player of the year Cory Bradford led the Illini to the Elite Eight, where they fell to eventual finalist Arizona in a much disputed contest. The Illini were accused of being overly physical most of the season, especially McClain and pesky guards Sean Harrington and Lucas Johnson (younger brother of former Illini forward Brian Johnson). The '01 Illini team also included Robert Archibald, Damir Krupalija and Marcus Griffin. With mostly the same core, Illinois followed up the season with impressive 2002 and 2003 campaigns, but fell in the Sweet 16 in 2002. He was the first head coach in the Big Ten, since 1912, to lead his team to conference championships in each of his first two seasons. It was also the first time Illinois won back-to-back titles in 50 years. Self, also, had an overall record of 78–24 in his three years as Illinois head coach. Self left for Kansas after the 2003 season.

=== 2003–12: Bruce Weber era ===
Bruce Weber served as the head coach of Illinois basketball for nine seasons from 2003 to 2012.

After Bill Self left, Illinois AD Ron Guenther hired Weber to coach the Fighting Illini on April 30, 2003. Weber came from Southern Illinois University (SIU) in Carbondale and was touted as a loyal coach, which was valued by the Illinois AD after both Kruger and Self left Champaign with relatively short tenures. In his five seasons as head coach at SIU, Weber took the Saluki program to the top of the Missouri Valley Conference, winning league titles in 2002 and 2003. He posted records of 28–8 and 24–7 in his last two seasons, leading the Salukis to back-to-back NCAA Tournament appearances, including a run to the Sweet 16 in 2002 with wins over Texas Tech and Georgia at the United Center in Chicago. His .689 (62–28) winning percentage in MVC play ranked 12th in the long history of the league. Weber earned Missouri Valley Conference Coach of the Year honors following the 2003 season.

Illinois totaled 210 victories under Weber from 2004 to 2012. He ranks third on the Illinois career coaching wins list. He won 67.5 percent of his games while in charge of the Fighting Illini (210–101). Under Weber, the Illini had two Big Ten Championships (2004, 2005), two runner-up finishes (2006, 2009) and seven upper-division finishes.

Illinois had five players selected in the NBA draft under Weber, as Deron Williams (No. 3, Utah Jazz) and Luther Head (No. 24, Houston Rockets) were taken in the first round of the 2005 NBA draft, and James Augustine (No. 41, Orlando Magic) and Dee Brown (No. 46, Utah Jazz) were chosen in the second round of the 2006 NBA draft. Meyers Leonard was chosen 11th by the Portland Trail Blazers in the 2012 NBA draft following Weber's final season. Utah's selection of Williams at No. 3 overall in the 2005 lottery made him the highest-drafted player in Illinois history.

It took just one season for Weber to etch his name in the Big Ten and Illinois record books after leading the Fighting Illini to its first outright Big Ten title in 52 years during the 2003–04 season. In leading his young team that featured just one senior on the roster, Weber became just the third coach in the history of the Big Ten to win an outright title in his first season. Illinois had to win 10 straight to end the regular season to claim the championship, including six-straight wins on the road. Illinois' 26 wins in 2003–04 tied the fourth-winningest season in school history. Weber also led the Illini to the Sweet 16 with NCAA Tournament victories over Murray State and Cincinnati.

In Weber's second year at Illinois, the 2004–05 team finished with a 37–2 record and was the national runner-up in the NCAA tournament. During Illinois' centennial basketball season, the Illini started the year with 29 straight wins, tying for the 12th-best start in NCAA Division I history and the third-best start in Big Ten history. Illinois also secured its second-straight outright Big Ten championship with a 15–1 league record, as Weber became the first coach in Big Ten history to win consecutive outright titles in his first two seasons. Illinois then added a Big Ten tournament championship in addition to its regular season title. The Illini were ranked No. 1 in the nation for 15 straight weeks, including a first-ever No. 1 ranking in the final Associated Press poll.

They gained the #1 overall seed in the NCAA Tournament and prevailed in one of the most memorable games in NCAA history against Arizona. Down 15 points with around 4 minutes left, the Illini rallied with a run led by Luther Head and Deron Williams. The game was sent into overtime and the Illini pulled off a one-point win to advance to the 2005 Final Four in St. Louis. It was the Fighting Illini's first Final Four Appearance since the 1988–89 season. Against the Louisville Cardinals in the national semifinal game, the Illini posted their final victory of the season. All of the five Illini starters–Deron Williams, Luther Head, Dee Brown, James Augustine, and Roger Powell, Jr.–would eventually play in the NBA. Williams and Brown both joined the Utah Jazz roster, while Luther Head went on to play for the Sacramento Kings.

With all that Illinois accomplished during the season, Weber swept the 2005 National Coach of the Year awards, claiming the following: the Naismith Award, the most prestigious coaching award in college basketball; the Henry Iba Award, presented by the U.S. Basketball Writers Association; and, the Adolph F. Rupp Cup. Weber was also named National Coach of the Year by the NABC, Associated Press, The Sporting News, Basketball Times, CBS/Chevrolet, Victor Awards and Nike Championship Basketball Clinic.

Despite losing three starters and 63 percent of its scoring from the 2004–05 NCAA runner-up squad, Weber directed the 2005–06 Illini to a third-consecutive 29-win season, a runner-up finish in the Big Ten, the second round of the NCAA Tournament, and a ranking among the nation's top 17 teams throughout the entire season. The Illini spent the majority of 2005–06 ranked in the Top 10 and recorded 26 wins on the year to tie the fourth-winningest season in school history. The Illini were given a number 4 seed in the NCAA tournament, where they beat Air Force in the opening round, before falling to the University of Washington in the second round.

The 2006–07 team finished with a record of 23–12 (9–7) and finished tied for fourth in the Big Ten. With a depleted roster that had six different players combine to miss a total of 58 games due to injury, the Illini still advanced to the NCAA Tournament. They were awarded a 12 seed and lost in the opening round to Virginia Tech.

The 2007–08 season was one of the worst seasons in Illinois history, highlighted by a string of close losses. The lone bright spot came as Illinois came on strong to win four of its last five and five of its final seven games, which culminated with a runner-up finish at the Big Ten tournament. Weber's Illini became the first No. 10 seed in the tournament's history to advance to the title game, winning three games in three days with victories over Penn State, No. 17 Purdue, and Minnesota to reach the championship game vs. No. 8 Wisconsin. However, with an overall record of 16–19 (5–13), the Illini were not selected to participate in postseason play.

Weber's 2008–09 UI squad was one of the most improved teams in the country finishing with a record of 24–10 (11–7). With 10 more regular season victories than it achieved the year before, Illinois posted the third-biggest turnaround in NCAA Division I and the second-biggest turnaround among BCS programs on the year. The Illini recorded 24 wins, ranking as the 10th winningest season in school history. Illinois was the Big Ten runner-up, earned a No. 5 seed in the 2009 NCAA Tournament, and finished the year ranked 24th in the Pomeroy rankings. The Illini lost in the first round of the NCAA tournament to the 12th-seeded Western Kentucky Hilltoppers.

During the 2009–10 season, the Illini finished 21–15 (10–8) and finished 5th in the Big Ten. The team was widely considered to be "on the bubble" for the NCAA tournament and missed the tournament field by a narrow margin. The Illini competed in the NIT, falling at home to the Dayton Flyers in the NIT Quarterfinals.

Illinois rebounded in 2010–11 to finish 20–14 (9–9) and tied for fourth in the Big Ten. The Illini were selected to join the NCAA tournament as a #9 seed, where they defeated the #8 seeded UNLV Rebels setting up a matchup with the #1 seeded Kansas Jayhawks and former coach Bill Self. Kansas proved to be too much for the Illini, and the season came to an end in the round of 32.

In 2011–12, Weber's last as coach of the Illini, the team finished 17–15 (6–12), good for 9th in the conference. The team did not compete in the postseason. Illinois' new AD Mike Thomas fired Weber after the 2011–12 season.

=== 2012–17: John Groce era ===
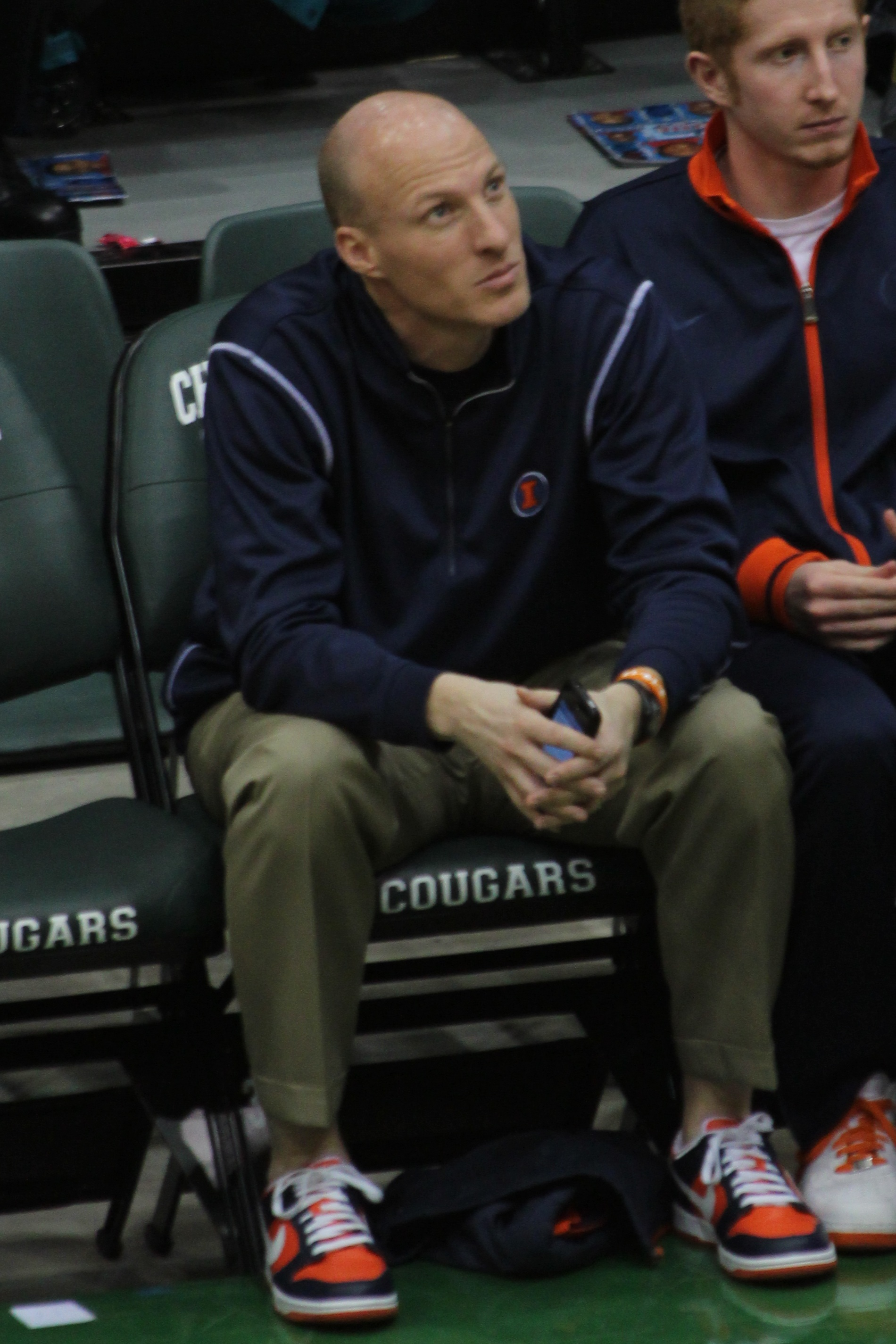
Coach Groce

John Groce was hired by the new athletic director Mike Thomas on March 28, 2012. During the 2012–13 season, the Illini were the Maui Invitational champions and later made the NCAA tournament, losing their second game to the Miami Hurricanes by a score of 63–59. The Illini spent eight weeks nationally ranked in the NCAA Division I rankings, and for two weeks were ranked as high as 10th in the country.

The 2013–14 season saw major roster turnover, with nine players leaving and nine players joining the program. This season was one to forget, as the Illini would ultimately miss the NCAA Tournament and lose in the second round of the NIT.

In 2014, Groce continued Illinois' success in November, improving to 21–0 under Groce and 32–0 overall during the past four seasons. Illinois is the only program in the nation with an undefeated November record dating back to 2011. The 2014–2015 season was once again disappointing for the Illini. Illinois finished with a record of 19–14, finishing tied for 7th place in the Big Ten with a record of 9–9. The Illini were then beaten in the first round of the NIT.

The 2015–16 season ended with the fewest total wins in almost 20 years since the 98–99 Lon Kruger crew won only 14 games. Groce's squad finished with a record of 15–19, taking 12th place in the Big Ten and receiving no post-season tournament invitations.

The 2016–17 season was another disappointing season for the Fighting Illini, as they finished the season at 18–14 and 8–10 in the conference, failing to make the NCAA Tournament for the fourth consecutive year. On March 11, 2017, the university announced via press release that Groce had been relieved of his duties as head men's basketball coach. The next day, the team was put into the NIT as a 2-seed. The team was coached during the NIT by interim coach Jamall Walker, making it to the quarterfinals before being eliminated by the University of Central Florida.

=== 2017–present: Brad Underwood era ===
On March 18, 2017, Brad Underwood was hired by athletic director Josh Whitman. Underwood previously coached at Stephen F. Austin from 2013 to 2016, before spending one year at Oklahoma State. In Underwood's first season at Illinois, the team won each of their first five contests. After beginning conference play 0–8, they ended the season with a record of 14–18.

While the 2018–19 season featured the debut of key pieces including Ayo Dosunmu, Giorgi Bezhanishvili, Andrés Feliz, and Alan Griffin, the Illini posted one of the worst records in program history at 12–21 (7–13 in Big Ten). Despite the poor record, Illinois had many memorable moments such as upsetting #9 Michigan State at home and Bezhanishvili scoring 35 points against Rutgers, breaking the Illini record for most points by a freshman in a single game.

The 2019–20 season was the freshman year of highly ranked center Kofi Cockburn. The Illini started the season slow in the first game, barely beating Nicholls State 78–70 in overtime. During the ACC–Big Ten Challenge, Illinois played Miami where they lost 81–79 after they mounted a huge comeback before a charge was called against Dosunmu on the game's final play. The next game they traveled to College Park to play against #3 Maryland. The Illini led by 14 at the half, but Maryland outscored Illinois 34–19 in the second half and won the game by an Anthony Cowan free throw. The Illini next played #5 Michigan at the State Farm Center. They would beat the Wolverines 71–62 to improve to 7–3 on the season. Over the next 12 games, the Illini went 10–2, including Dosunmu's game-winning shot during their second matchup against Michigan to give Illinois a 64–62 lead with half a second left on the clock. Illinois would finish the season with a 21–10 (13–7) record which would be good enough for 4th in the Big Ten. They would also finish ranked 21st in the AP Poll and 22nd in the Coaches Poll.

The 2020–21 season that Underwood finally had mostly his recruits running the team and it certainly showed on the court. After much deliberation, Ayo Dosunmu returned to Illinois for his junior season instead of going to the NBA. He, along with Kofi Cockburn, helped make Illinois into a top-10 team. They went 16-4 (0.800) in the B1G conference but had a worse record than Michigan (14-3, 0.824), and therefore did not earn even a share of the title. This title was disputed as Michigan had failed to play three extra games because of COVID protocols, and only one loss in those three games would have given Illinois the title; Illinois had beaten Michigan by 23 without leading scorer Ayo Dosunmu in Ann Arbor. The team went on to win the Big Ten tournament title, however, after a hard-fought, overtime 91–88 win over OSU. Illinois became a #1 seed in the NCAA Tournament for the 4th time in school history. They were upset by Loyola-Chicago in the 2nd round and finished the season 24–7. Dosunmu became the first player in Illini history to earn 1st-team All-America honors by the AP. Cockburn was named to the AP All-American 2nd-team.

Before the 2021–22 season, Underwood's assistant coaching staff completely turned over, with Chin Coleman and Orlando Antigua going to Kentucky and Stephen Gentry returning to Gonzaga. Ayo Dosunmu was drafted by the Chicago Bulls and Adam Miller transferred to LSU, leading to André Curbelo being expected to serve as the primary ball handler. Unfortunately, Curbelo suffered a concussion prior to the season opener that would continue to affect him throughout the season. The team was led by fifth-year players Trent Frazier and Da'Monte Williams. Kofi Cockburn returned for his junior year but was suspended for the first three games for selling his team jerseys during the off-season. The team tied with Wisconsin for a share of the Big Ten regular season title, with a record of 15-5. Due to the tiebreaker rules, the team was seeded first in the Big Ten Tournament but lost its first game to ninth-seeded Indiana. The team was given the #4 seed in the South region of the NCAA tournament. After a 54-53 victory against Chattanooga, the team lost in the second round to Houston. Cockburn was named to the AP All-American 1st-team.

The roster suffered from some major turnover before the 2022–23 season, with five players transferring out of the program, four players graduating, and Kofi Cockburn electing to stay in the NBA draft (and ultimately going undrafted). Three players transferred into the program and six freshmen were recruited. As a result of the roster changes, the team would be led by Terrence Shannon Jr. and Coleman Hawkins. The Illini would secure two major wins in non-conference play, beating #8 UCLA in the Continental Tire Main Event semifinal and #2 Texas in the Jimmy V Classic. Both Zacharie Perrin and Skyy Clark left the program during the season. Ultimately the season was a step back for the program, as due to tiebreaker rules, the team received a seven seed and lost to Penn State in their first game of the Big Ten Tournament. The team then received the #9 seed in the West region and lost in the first round of the NCAA Tournament to Arkansas. For the first time since Underwood's second season, the team finished the season unranked in the AP Poll.

The 2023-24 season would be one to remember. Three pivotal graduate transfers, Marcus Domask, Quincy Guerrier, and Justin Harmon joined the team, with Domask and Guerrier starting most games. The Illini went on an undefeated trip to Spain and then beat #1 ranked Kansas in a televised exhibition game. The team lost only two games to non-NCAA tournament teams, once to Penn State and once to Maryland. After finishing second in the Big Ten standings, the team ultimately won the Big Ten Tournament, prevailing over Wisconsin. The team was selected to the NCAA tournament as the #3 seed in the East region. For the first time in Underwood's tenure, the team made the Sweet Sixteen, where it beat the #2 seed, Iowa State. For the first time since the 2004–05 season, the team made the Elite Eight, where it lost to #1-overall and eventual national champion UConn.

Major turnover again beset the Illini prior to the 2024-25 season. Terrence Shannon Jr. was drafted by the Minnesota Timberwolves and every scholarship player from the prior season save two, Ty Rodgers (who ultimately redshirted) and Dra Gibbs-Lawhorn, left the program. Assistant coaches Chester Frazier and Tim Anderson left the program, leading to the return of Orlando Antigua and the temporary promotion of Kwa Jones. The Illini had one of its strongest freshmen classes in its history, including 2025 first round picks Kasparas Jakučionis and Will Riley. Following a season plagued by injury and illness, the Illini made the NCAA Tournament as the #6 seed in the Midwest region. The team won its first game against Xavier and then lost the following game to Kentucky.

The 2025–26 season saw the Illini build on the program's renewed momentum. Illinois finished the regular season with a 28–9 overall record and a 15–5 mark in Big Ten play. The team was selected to the NCAA Tournament as the #3 seed in their region, led in part by standout freshman Keaton Wagler. Illinois opened tournament play with a dominant 105–70 victory over #14 Penn on March 19, followed by a 76–55 win over #11 VCU in the second round on March 21. In the Sweet Sixteen on March 26, the Illini knocked out #2 Houston 65–55, advancing to the Elite Eight for the second time in the past three seasons. There, they defeated #9 Iowa 71–59 on March 2, which sent the team to the Final Four for the first time since the 2004–05 season. In the Final Four, the Illini fell to #2 UConn 71–62, ending their season.

=== Records by coach ===
Coach	Years	Record	Conference record	Conference champion	NCAA bids
Thomas E. Thompson	1910–1912	14–14	10–13		
Ralph R. Jones	1912–1920	85–34	64–31	2	
Frank J. Winters	1920–1922	25–12	14–10		
J. Craig Ruby	1922–1936	148–95	94–74	2	
Douglas R. Mills	1936–1947	151–66	88–47	3	1
Harry Combes	1947–1967	316–150	174–104	4	4
Harv Schmidt	1967–1974	89–77	43–55		
Gene Bartow	1974–1975	8–18	4–14		
Lou Henson	1975–1996	423–224	214–164	1	12
Lon Kruger	1996–2000	81–48	38–28	1	3
Bill Self	2000–2003	78–24	35–13	2	3
Bruce Weber	2003–2012	210–101	89–65	2	6
John Groce	2012–2017	95–74	37–53		1
Jamall Walker (interim)	2017	2–1			
Brad Underwood	2017–	193-110	107-71	1	6
Totals		1957–1083	998–756	18	36

== Championships ==
=== National championships ===
Year	Coach	Selector	Record
1915	Ralph Jones	Helms Athletic Foundation (retroactive & unofficial)	16–0

=== Conference championships ===
==== Regular season ====
Season	Conference	Coach	Overall	Conference
1914–15	Western Conference	Ralph Jones	16–0	12–0
1916–17†	Western Conference	Ralph Jones	13–3	10–2
1923–24†	Big Ten Conference	J. Craig Ruby	11–6	8–4
1934–35†	Big Ten Conference	J. Craig Ruby	15–5	9–3
1936–37†	Big Ten Conference	Douglas R. Mills	14–4	10–2
1941–42	Big Ten Conference	Douglas R. Mills	18–5	13–2
1942–43	Big Ten Conference	Douglas R. Mills	17–1	12–0
1948–49	Big Ten Conference	Harry Combes	21–4	10–2
1950–51	Big Ten Conference	Harry Combes	22–5	13–1
1951–52	Big Ten Conference	Harry Combes	22–4	12–2
1962–63†	Big Ten Conference	Harry Combes	20–6	11–3
1983–84†	Big Ten Conference	Lou Henson	26–5	15–3
1997–98†	Big Ten Conference	Lon Kruger	23–10	13–3
2000–01†	Big Ten Conference	Bill Self	27–8	13–3
2001–02†	Big Ten Conference	Bill Self	26–9	11–5
2003–04	Big Ten Conference	Bruce Weber	26–7	13–3
2004–05	Big Ten Conference	Bruce Weber	37–2	15–1
2021–22†	Big Ten Conference	Brad Underwood	23–10	15–5

† – Conference co-champions

==== Tournament ====
Year	Conference	Coach	Site	Opponent	Score
2003	Big Ten Conference	Bill Self	United Center (Chicago, Illinois)	Ohio State	72–59
2005	Big Ten Conference	Bruce Weber	United Center (Chicago, Illinois)	Wisconsin	54–43
2021	Big Ten Conference	Brad Underwood	Lucas Oil Stadium (Indianapolis, Indiana)	Ohio State	91–88 OT
2024	Big Ten Conference	Brad Underwood	Target Center (Minneapolis, Minnesota)	Wisconsin	93–87

== Postseason history ==
=== NCAA Division I Tournament ===
==== Seeding ====
The NCAA began seeding the tournament with the 1979 edition.

Coach	Henson																	
Years	'79	'80	'81	'82	'83	'84	'85	'86	'87	'88	'89	'90	'91	'92	'93	'94	'95	'96
Seeds	–	–	4	–	7	2	3	4	3	3	1	5	x	–	6	8	11	–

Coach	Kruger				Self			Weber									Groce				
Years	'97	'98	'99	'00	'01	'02	'03	'04	'05	'06	'07	'08	'09	'10	'11	'12	'13	'14	'15	'16	'17
Seeds	6	5	–	4	1	4	4	5	1	4	12	–	5	–	9	–	7	–	–	–	–

Coach	Underwood								
Years	'18	'19	'20	'21	'22	'23	'24	'25	'26
Seeds	–	–	x	1	4	9	3	6	3

==== Results ====
The Fighting Illini have appeared in the NCAA tournament 36 times. Their combined record is 49–37.

Year	Seed	Round	Opponent	Results
1942		Elite Eight; Regional 3rd-place game	Kentucky; Penn State	L 44–46; L 34–41
1949		Elite Eight; Final Four; National 3rd-place game	Yale; Kentucky; Oregon State	W 71–67; L 47–76; W 57–53
1951		Sweet Sixteen; Elite Eight; Final Four; National 3rd-place game	Columbia; NC State; Kentucky; Oklahoma A&M	W 79–71; W 84–70; L 74–76; W 61–46
1952		Sweet Sixteen; Elite Eight; Final Four; National 3rd-place game	Dayton; Duquesne; St. John's; Santa Clara	W 80–61; W 74–68; L 59–61; W 67–64
1963		Sweet Sixteen; Elite Eight	Bowling Green; Loyola–Chicago	W 70–67; L 64–79
1981	#4	Second Round; Sweet Sixteen	#5 Wyoming #8 Kansas State	W 67–65; L 52–57
1983	#7	First Round	#10 Utah	L 49–52
1984	#2	Second Round; Sweet Sixteen; Elite Eight	#7 Villanova #3 Maryland #1 Kentucky	W 64–56; W 72–70; L 51–54
1985	#3	First Round; Second Round; Sweet Sixteen	#14 Northeastern #6 Georgia #2 Georgia Tech	W 76–57; W 74–58; L 53–61
1986	#4	First Round; Second Round	#13 Fairfield #5 Alabama	W 75–51; L 56–58
1987	#3	First Round	#14 Austin Peay	L 67–68
1988	#3	First Round; Second Round	#14 Texas-San Antonio #6 Villanova	W 81–72; L 63–66
1989	#1	First Round; Second Round; Sweet Sixteen; Elite Eight; Final Four	#16 McNeese State #9 Ball State #4 Louisville #2 Syracuse #3 Michigan	W 77–71; W 72–60; W 83–69; W 89–86; L 81–83
1990	#5	First Round	#12 Dayton	L 86–88
1993	#6	First Round; Second Round	#11 Long Beach State #3 Vanderbilt	W 75–72; L 68–85
1994	#8	First Round	#9 Georgetown	L 77–84
1995	#11	First Round	#6 Tulsa	L 62–68
1997	#6	First Round; Second Round	#11 Southern California #14 UT Chattanooga	W 90–77; L 63–75
1998	#5	First Round; Second Round	#12 South Alabama #4 Maryland	W 64–51; L 61–67
2000	#4	First Round; Second Round	#13 Penn #5 Florida	W 68–58; L 76–93
2001	#1	First Round; Second Round; Sweet Sixteen; Elite Eight	#16 Northwestern State #9 Charlotte #4 Kansas #2 Arizona	W 96–54; W 79–61; W 80–64; L 81–87
2002	#4	First Round; Second Round; Sweet Sixteen	#13 San Diego State #12 Creighton #1 Kansas	W 93–64; W 72–60; L 69–73
2003	#4	First Round; Second Round	#13 Western Kentucky #5 Notre Dame	W 65–60; L 60–68
2004	#5	First Round; Second Round; Sweet Sixteen	#12 Murray State #4 Cincinnati #1 Duke	W 72–53; W 92–68; L 62–72
2005	#1	First Round; Second Round; Sweet Sixteen; Elite Eight; Final Four; National Championship	#16 Fairleigh Dickinson #9 Nevada #12 Milwaukee #3 Arizona #4 Louisville #1 North Carolina	W 67–55; W 71–59; W 77–63; W 90–89 ^{OT} W 72–57; L 70–75
2006	#4	First Round; Second Round	#13 Air Force #5 Washington	W 78–69; L 64–67
2007	#12	First Round	#5 Virginia Tech	L 52–54
2009	#5	First Round	#12 Western Kentucky	L 72–76
2011	#9	First Round; Second Round	#8 UNLV #1 Kansas	W 73–62; L 59–73
2013	#7	First Round; Second Round	#10 Colorado #2 Miami	W 57–49; L 59–63
2021	#1	First Round; Second Round	#16 Drexel #8 Loyola–Chicago	W 78–49; L 58–71
2022	#4	First Round; Second Round	#13 Chattanooga #5 Houston	W 54–53; L 53–68
2023	#9	First Round	#8 Arkansas	L 63–73
2024	#3	First Round; Second Round; Sweet Sixteen; Elite Eight	#14 Morehead State #11 Duquesne #2 Iowa State #1 UConn	W 85–69; W 89–63; W 72–69; L 52–77
2025	#6	First Round; Second Round	#11 Xavier #3 Kentucky	W 86–73; L 75-84
2026	#3	First Round; Second Round; Sweet Sixteen; Elite Eight; Final Four	#14 Penn #11 VCU #2 Houston #9 Iowa #2 UConn	W 105-70; W 76-55; W 65-55; W 71-59; L 62-71

=== National Invitational Tournament ===
==== Seeding ====
The NIT began seeding the tournament with the 2006 edition.

Years →	'06	'07	'08	'09	'10	'11	'12	'13	'14	'15	'16	'17	'18	'19	'20	'21	'22	'23	'24	'25
Seeds →	–	–	–	–	1	–	–	–	2	3	–	2	–	–	x	–	–	–	–	–

==== Results ====
Year	Seed	Round	Opponent	Result
1980		First Round; Second Round; Quarterfinals; Semifinals; 3rd Place Game	Loyola-Chicago; Illinois State; Murray State; Minnesota; UNLV	W 105–87; W 75–65; W 65–63; L 63–65; W 84–74
1982		First Round; Second Round	LIU; Dayton	W 126–78; L 58–61
1996		First Round	Alabama	L 69–72
2010	#1	First Round; Second Round; Quarterfinals	Stony Brook; Kent State; Dayton	W 76–66; W 75–58; L 71–77
2014	#2	First Round; Second Round	Boston University; Clemson	W 66–62; L 49–50
2015	#3	First Round	Alabama	L 58–79
2017	#2	First Round; Second Round; Quarterfinals	Valparaiso; Boise State; UCF	W 82–57; W 71–56; L 58–68

== Facilities ==
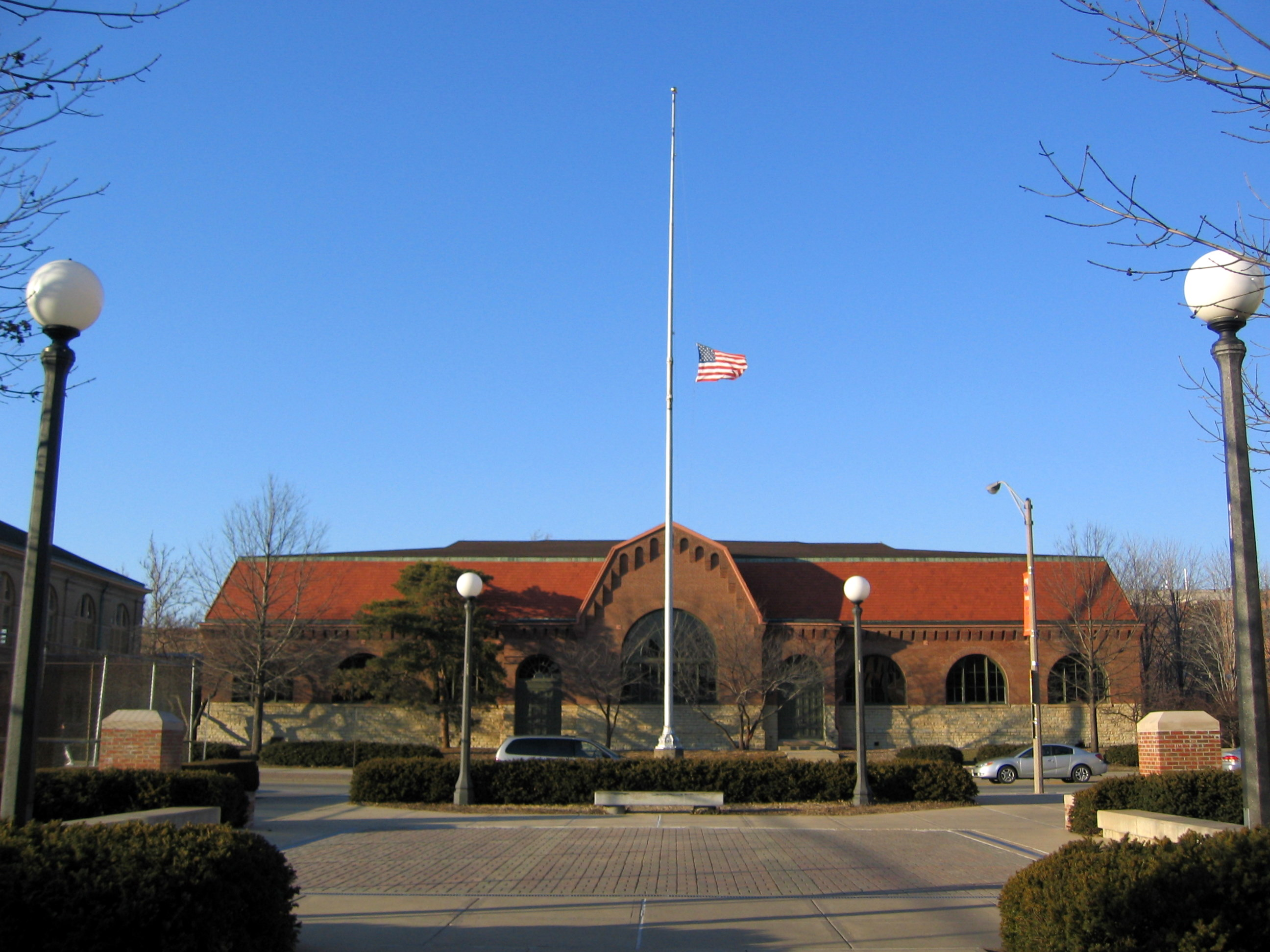
Kenney Gym

=== Kenney Gym (1905–1925) ===
Kenney Gym Annex is a 5,000-seat multi-purpose arena that is the practice facility for the Fighting Illini gymnastics team. Before the opening of Huff Hall in 1925, Kenney Gym housed the Illinois Fighting Illini men's basketball team. It also was home to the Women's Volleyball program from 1974 until 1989, after which the program moved to Huff Hall in 1990.

=== Huff Hall (1925–1963) ===
Huff Hall is a 4,050-seat multi-purpose arena in Champaign, Illinois, United States. The arena opened in 1925 and was known as Huff Gymnasium until the 1990s. It is named after George Huff, the school's athletic director from 1895 to 1935. Huff Hall is home to the University of Illinois Fighting Illini volleyball and wrestling teams. Before the opening of Assembly Hall in 1963, it was home to the basketball team as well.

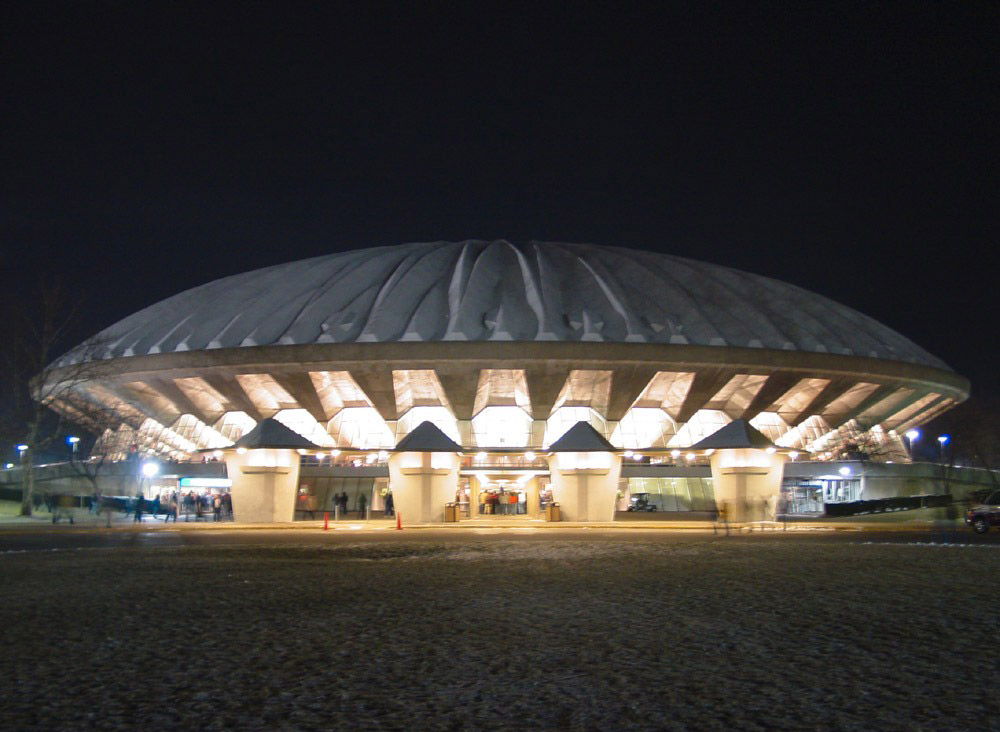
State Farm Center

=== State Farm Center (1963–) ===
Assembly Hall opened on March 2, 1963, and hosts the home games for the men's and women's basketball teams. Max Abramovitz, an Illinois alumnus, was the lead architect behind the building of the indoor arena. At the time of its opening, Assembly Hall could hold 16,128 people, making it the largest dome structure in North America until the Houston Astrodome opened in 1965.

In 2008, school officials, led by athletic director Ron Guenther, conducted a study to decide whether to refurbish the Assembly Hall or build a new basketball arena. In 2010, they decided to keep the arena. In 2014, renovations began under the watch of AECOM, an architectural firm based out of Dallas Texas. The estimated cost of the project was estimated to be around $169.5 million and in turn State Farm Insurance decided to buy the naming rights of the stadium.

=== Ubben Basketball Complex (1998–present) ===
The 2-story, 40,000-square-foot building is home to the University of Illinois Men's and Women's basketball programs. The facility includes offices, locker areas, weight training facilities and team meeting rooms in addition to the practice basketball courts. The Illinois Champions Campaign was a major catalyst of the $40 million renovation.

=== Prairie Capital Convention Center (2015) ===
In November 2015, the arena hosted the team for five games while renovations to the State Farm Center were completed.

== Rivalries ==
=== Indiana Hoosiers ===
Illinois and Indiana's rivalry started because the teams share a state border and they are located about 153 miles (246 km) apart. The two teams first met in 1906, and have played at least once annually since 1947. Indiana leads the all-time series 96–94.

=== Iowa Hawkeyes ===
Numerous on-court and off-court factors have played into the creation of the rivalry between Illinois and Iowa. The two schools share a state border and are located about 242 miles (389 km) apart, and they share recruiting ground. Among the off-court elements of the rivalry, recruiting of basketball talent has resulted in battles for specific athletes. The most notable battle turned into the Pearl/Thomas Incident, which began when both schools were recruiting Deon Thomas, and resulted in recruiting restrictions and a one-year post-season ban for Illinois. Illinois leads the all-time series 96-77.

=== Northwestern Wildcats ===
Illinois and Northwestern first met on March 7, 1908, with an Illinois victory, 18–13. The teams have continued to compete annually with the exception of 12 seasons. Illinois leads the all-time series 146–46.

=== Missouri Tigers ===
Illinois and Missouri meet once a year at the Enterprise Center in St. Louis; the rivalry has a sporadic but long history. The meeting is traditionally held over the students' holiday break near the end of December, and is nationally televised. Illinois leads the all-time series 36–20.

== Notable players, coaches, and associates ==
=== Naismith Basketball Hall of Famers ===
Class	Inductee	Tenure	Category
1961	Andy Phillip	1941–1943, 1946–1947	Player
1971	Abe Saperstein	1920	Contributor
2004	Jerry Colangelo	1960–1962	Contributor
2017	Mannie Jackson	1957–1960	Contributor
2017	Bill Self	2000–2003	Coach
2025	Deron Williams	2002–2005	Team*

*As a member of the 2008 U.S. men's Olympic basketball team (see Redeem Team)

=== National Collegiate Basketball Hall of Famers ===
Year	Inductee	Tenure	Category
2006	Andy Phillip	1941–1943, 1946–1947	Player
2007	Vic Bubas	1944–1945	Contributor
2009	Gene Bartow	1974–1975	Coach
2015	Lou Henson	1975–1996	Coach

=== Award winners ===
==== National awards ====
- Helms Foundation Player of the Year
  Ray Woods (1917)
  Chuck Carney (1922)
- Sporting News Player of the Year
  Andy Phillip (1943)
  Dee Brown (2005)
- USA Today Player of the Year
  Ayo Dosunmu (2021)
- Bob Cousy Award
  Dee Brown (2006)
  Ayo Dosunmu (2021)
- Jerry West Award
  Keaton Wagler (2026)
- Frances Pomeroy Naismith Award
  Dee Brown (2006)
- Naismith Coach of the Year
  Bruce Weber (2005)
- AP Coach of the Year
  Bruce Weber (2005)
- NABC Coach of the Year
  Bruce Weber (2005)
- Sporting News Coach of the Year
  Bruce Weber (2005)
- Victor Awards Coach of the Year
  Bruce Weber (2005)
- Henry Iba Award
  Bruce Weber (2005)
- Adolph Rupp Cup
  Bruce Weber (2005)
- Basketball Times Coach of the Year
  Bruce Weber (2005)
- CBS Coach of the Year
  Bruce Weber (2005)
- NCAA Tournament Regional Most Outstanding Player
  Nick Anderson (1989)
  Deron Williams (2005)
  Keaton Wagler (2026)
- NCAA Final Four All-Tournament Team
  Jim Bredar & Johnny "Red" Kerr–1952
  Luther Head & Deron Williams–2005

==== Conference awards ====
- Big Ten Medal of Honor
  Allan Williford (1915)
  Clyde Alwood (1917)
  John Felmley (1920)
  Otto Vogel (1923)
  Wally Roettger (1924)
  Harry Combes (1937)
  William Hocking (1942)
  Edwin Parker (1943)
  Donald Delaney (1945)
  Dwight Eddleman (1949)
  Clive Follmer (1953)
  David Downey (1963)
  Bogie Redmon (1965)
  Jack Ingram (2005)
  Dee Brown (2006)
  Warren Carter (2007)
  Trenton Meacham (2009)
  Brandon Paul (2013)
- Big Ten Player of the Year
  Bruce Douglas (1984)*
  Frank Williams (2001)
  Brian Cook (2003)
  Dee Brown (2005)
- Chicago Tribune Silver Basketball
  Dwight Eddleman (1949)
  Don Sunderlage (1951)
  Johnny Kerr (1954)
  Jimmy Dawson (1967)
  Frank Williams (2001)
  Brian Cook (2003)
  Dee Brown (2005)
- Big Ten Defensive Player of the Year
  Bruce Douglas (1985)
  Bruce Douglas (1986)
  Stephen Bardo (1989)
  Dee Brown (2005)
- Big Ten Freshman of the Year
  Cory Bradford (1999)
  Brian Cook (2000)*
  D. J. Richardson (2010)
  Kofi Cockburn (2020)
  Keaton Wagler (2026)
- Big Ten Sixth Man of the Year
  André Curbelo (2021)
  Will Riley (2025)
- Big Ten Coach of the Year
  Lou Henson (1993)
  Bruce Weber (2005)
- Big Ten Tournament Most Outstanding Player
  Brian Cook (2003)
  James Augustine (2005)
  Ayo Dosunmu (2021)
  Terrence Shannon Jr. (2024)

=== NCAA All-Americans ===
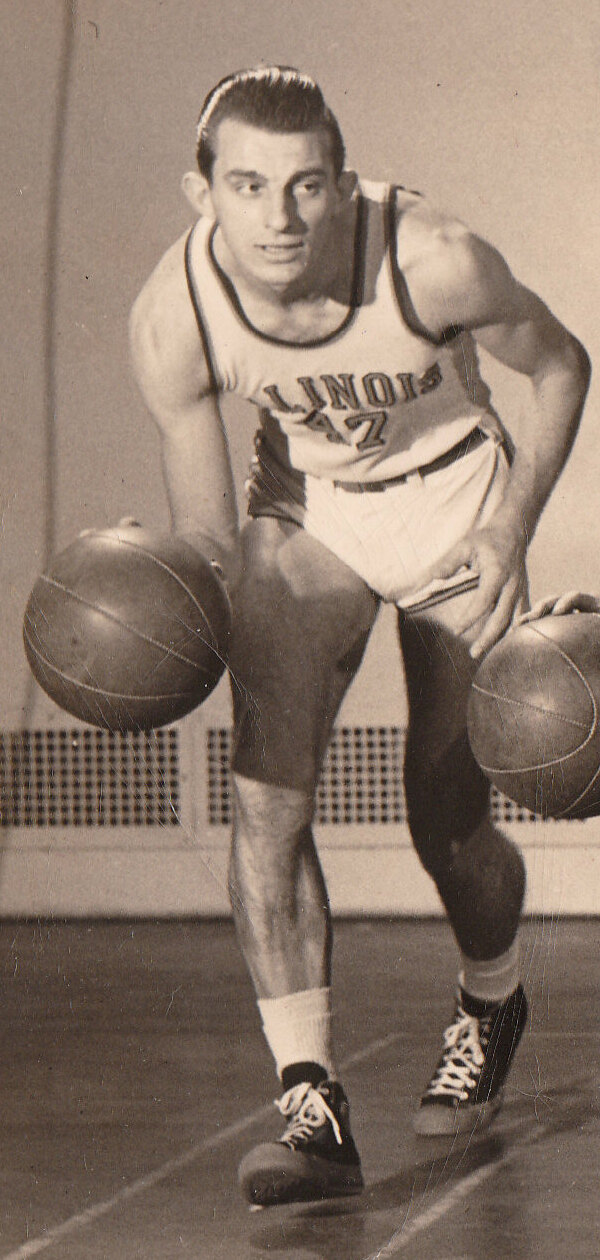
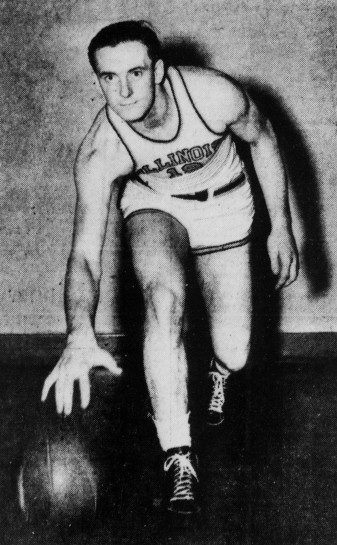
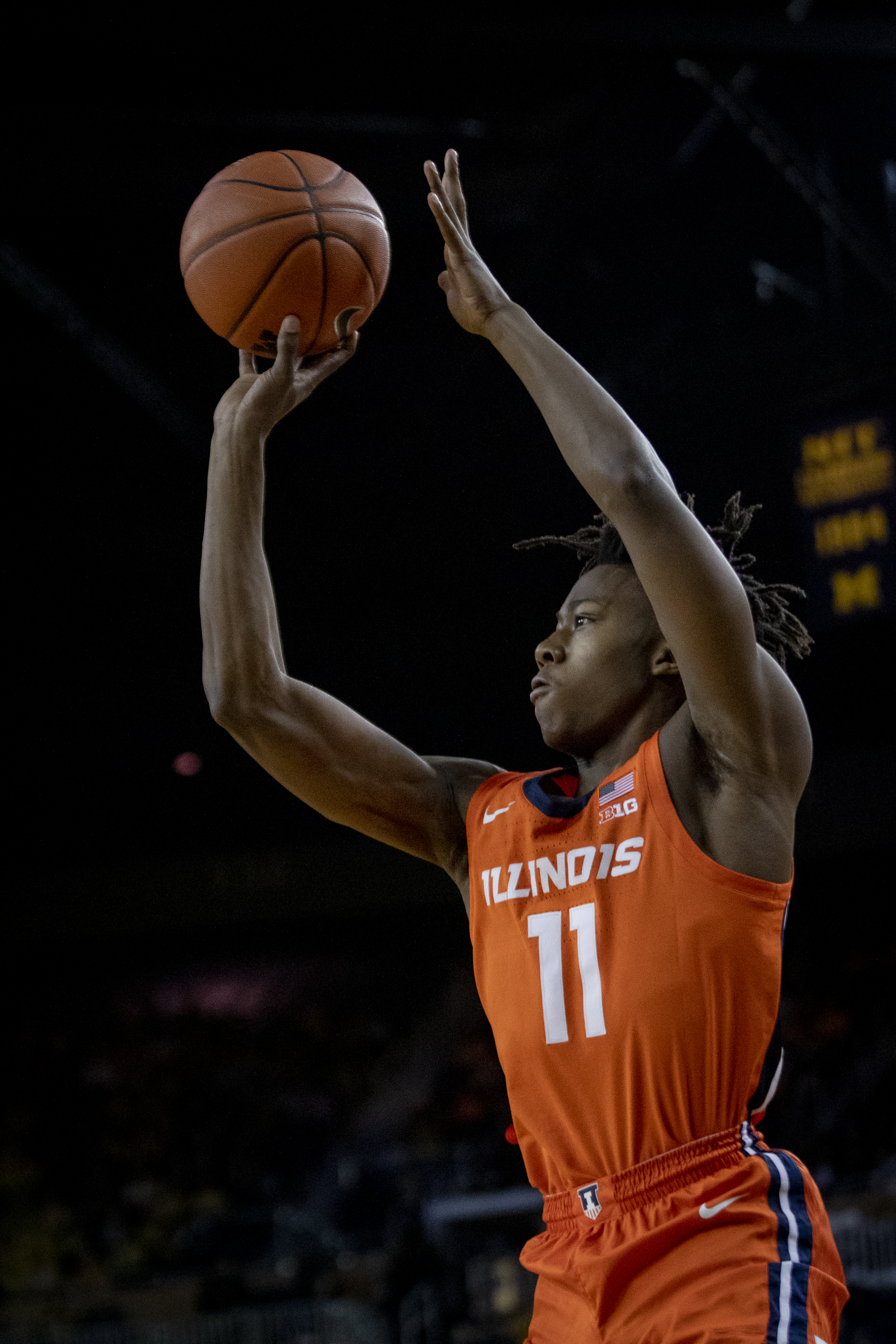
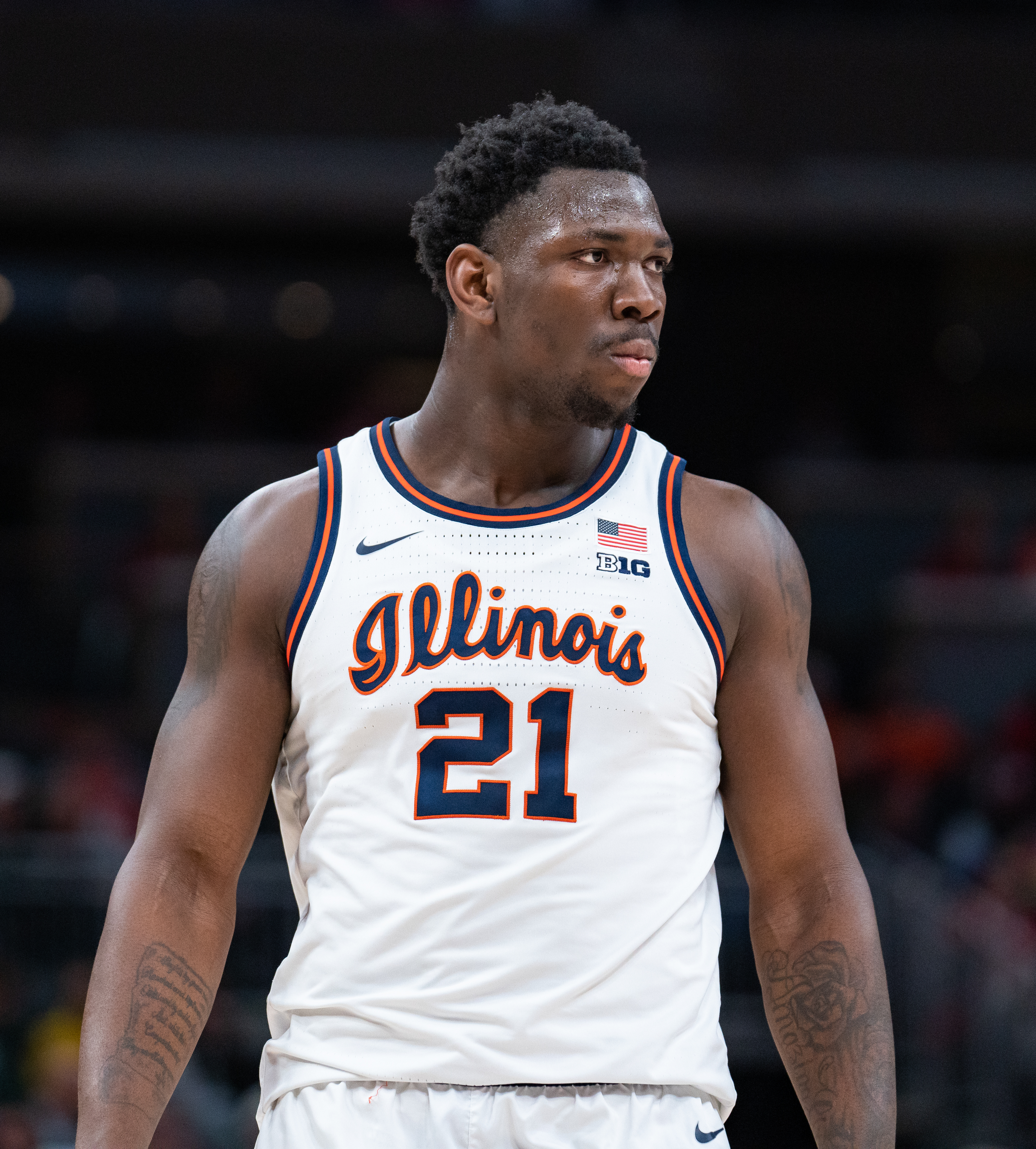
All-Americans Andy Phillip (top left), Bill Hapac (top right), Ayo Dosunmu (bottom left), and Kofi Cockburn (bottom right)

Illinois has had a total of 35 players who have claimed All-American status.

- Ray Woods – 1915†, 1916†, 1917†
- Clyde Alwood – 1917†
- Earl William Anderson – 1918†
- Chuck Carney – 1920†, 1922†
- Lou Boudreau – 1938
- Pick Dehner – 1938, 1939
- Bill Hapac – 1940†
- Andy Phillip – 1942†, 1943†, 1947†
- Jack Smiley – 1943, 1947
- Walt Kirk – 1945†
- Dwight Eddleman – 1948, 1949
- Bill Erickson – 1949†
- Don Sunderlage – 1951
- Rod Fletcher – 1952†
- Irv Bemoras – 1953
- Jim Bredar – 1953
- Johnny Kerr – 1954
- Bill Ridley – 1956
- Paul Judson – 1956
- George Bon Salle – 1957
- Skip Thoren – 1965
- Dave Scholz – 1969
- Derek Harper – 1983
- Bruce Douglas – 1984
- Ken Norman – 1987†
- Kendall Gill – 1990†
- Frank Williams – 2001
- Brian Cook – 2003
- Dee Brown – 2005†, 2006†
- Luther Head – 2005†
- Deron Williams – 2005†
- Ayo Dosunmu – 2021†
- Kofi Cockburn – 2021†, 2022†
- Terrence Shannon Jr. – 2024
- Keaton Wagler - 2026†

† = Consensus All-American

=== Illinois All-Century Team ===
In 2004, during the celebration of the program's 100th year of basketball as a varsity sport, the University of Illinois Division of Intercollegiate Athletics announced its All-Century Team. The 20-man team was selected after online voting by fans and the Illinois Basketball Centennial Committee. The honorees were feted during the Illinois Basketball Centennial Reunion Weekend, Jan. 28–30, 2005.

† Naismith Memorial Basketball Hall of Fame inductee
‡ National Collegiate Basketball Hall of Fame inductee
§ Illinois Basketball Coaches Association Hall of Fame inductee

Position	Player	Tenure	Honors
Guard	Ray Woods	1914–1917	Helms Foundation national champion (1915); Helms Foundation National Player of the Year (1917); 3× First-team All-American (1915, 1916, 1917); 3× First-team All-Big Ten (1915, 1916, 1917)
Guard	Andy Phillip^{†‡§}	1941–1943, 1946–1947	Sporting News National Player of the Year (1943); Big Ten Most Valuable Player (1943); 2× University of Illinois Athlete of the Year (1942, 1943); 2× Consensus First-team All-American (1942, 1943); Consensus Second-team All-American (1947); 3× First-team All-Big Ten (1942, 1943, 1947)
Guard	Gene Vance^{§}	1941–1943, 1946–1947	2× First-team All-Big Ten (1942, 1943); Second-team All-Big Ten (1947)
Guard	Donnie Freeman^{§}	1963–1966	First-team All-American (1966); First-team All-Big Ten (1966); Third-team All-Big Ten (1965)
Guard	Derek Harper	1980–1983	Second-team All-American (1983); First-team All-Big Ten (1983)
Guard	Bruce Douglas^{§}	1982–1986	Co–Big Ten Player of the Year (1984); 2× Big Ten Defensive Player of the Year (1985, 1986); Third-team All-American (1984); First-team All-Big Ten (1984); 2× Second-team All-Big Ten (1985, 1986); NCAA All-Regional Team (1984)
Guard	Nick Anderson^{§}	1987–1989	First-team All-Big Ten (1989); Second-team All-Big Ten (1988); NCAA Regional Most Outstanding Player (1989); NCAA All-Regional Team (1989)
Guard	Kendall Gill^{§}	1986–1990	University of Illinois Athlete of the Year (1990); Kenny Battle Leadership Award (1989); Consensus Second-team All-American (1990); First-team All-Big Ten (1990); NCAA All-Regional Team (1989)
Guard	Frank Williams^{§}	1999–2002	Big Ten Player of the Year (2001); Chicago Tribune Silver Basketball (2001); First-team All-American (2001); 2× First-team All-Big Ten (2001, 2002)
Forward	Dwight "Dike" Eddleman^{§}	1945–1949	Chicago Tribune Silver Basketball (1949); Big Ten Medal of Honor (1949); 2× University of Illinois Athlete of the Year (1948, 1949); First-team All-American (1949); Second-team All-American (1948); First-team All-Big Ten (1949); Second-team All-Big Ten (1948)
Forward	Dave Downey^{§}	1960–1963	Big Ten Medal of Honor (1963); First-team All-American (1963); First-team All-Big Ten (1963); 2× Second-team All-Big Ten (1961, 1962); NCAA All-Regional Team (1963)
Forward	Nick Weatherspoon	1970–1973	First-team All-Big Ten (1973)
Forward	Eddie Johnson	1977–1981	First-team All-Big Ten (1981); Second-team All-Big Ten (1980)
Forward	Ken Norman^{§}	1984–1987	Consensus Second-team All-American (1987); 2× First-team All-Big Ten (1986, 1987)
Forward	Kenny Battle^{§}	1987–1989	Second-team All-Big Ten (1989); Third-team All-Big Ten (1988); NCAA All-Regional Team (1989)
Forward	Deon Thomas^{§}	1990–1994	University of Illinois Freshman of the Year (1991); 3× Second-team All-Big Ten (1992, 1993, 1994); Third-team All-Big Ten (1991)
Center	Chuck Carney^{§}	1920–1922	Helms Foundation National Player of the Year (1922); 2× First-team All-American (1920, 1922); 3× First-team All-Big Ten (1920, 1921, 1922)
Center	Johnny "Red" Kerr^{§}	1951–1954	Chicago Tribune Silver Basketball (1954); Third-team All-American (1954); First-team All-Big Ten (1954); 2× Second-team All-Big Ten (1952, 1953); NCAA Final Four All-Tournament Team (1952)
Center	Skip Thoren^{§}	1962–1965	First-team All-American (1965); First-team All-Big Ten (1965); Second-team All-Big Ten (1964)
Center	Brian Cook^{§}	1999–2003	Big Ten Player of the Year (2003); Chicago Tribune Silver Basketball (2003); Co–Big Ten Freshman of the Year (2000); Big Ten Tournament Most Outstanding Player (2003); Third-team All-American (2003); First-team All-Big Ten (2003); 2× Second-team All-Big Ten (2001, 2002); 2× Big Ten All-Tournament Team (2000, 2003)

== Statistical leaders ==
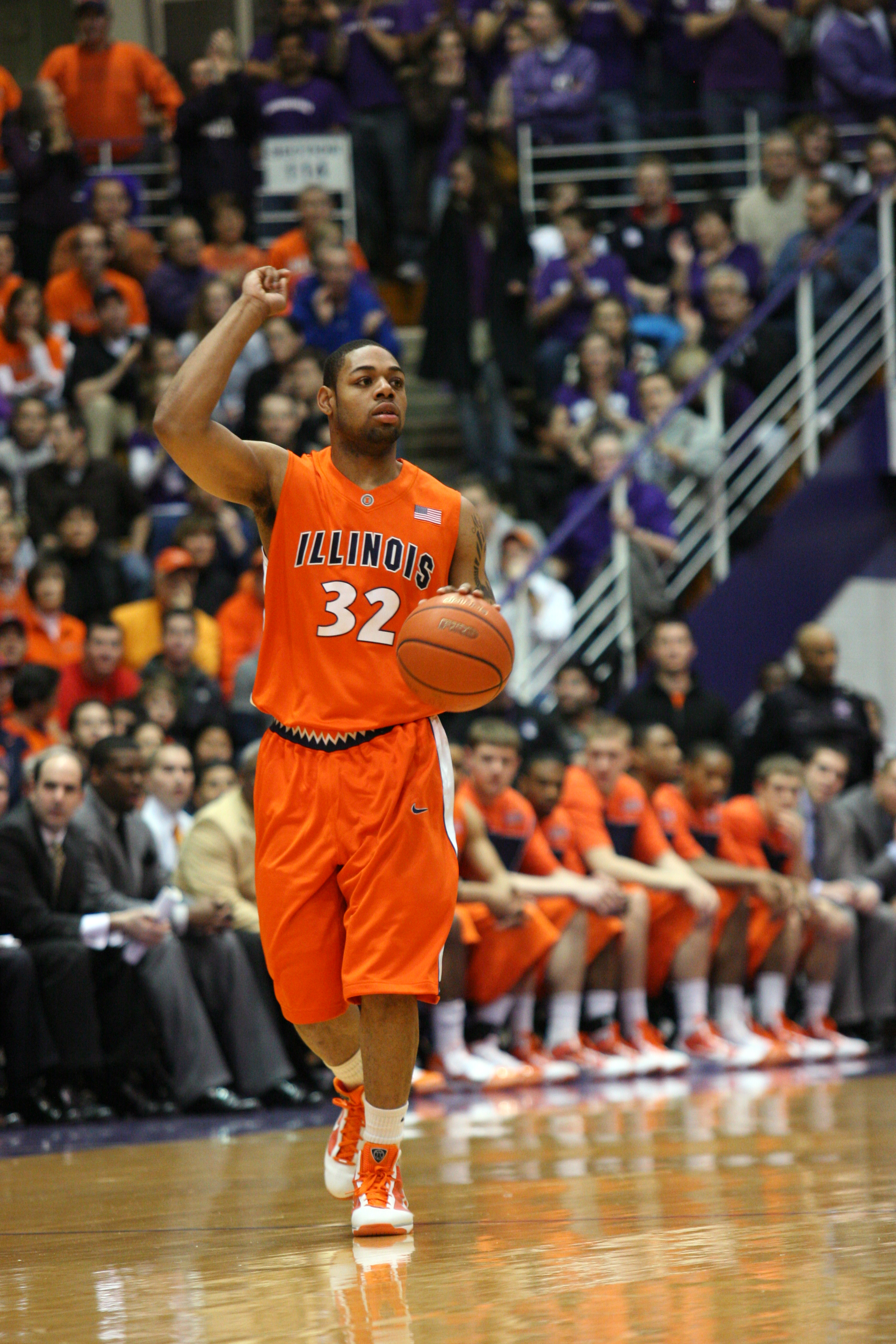
Former Fighting Illini Demetri McCamey

=== All-time records ===
All-time records
Record	Player	Tenure	Statistic
Games played	Da'Monte Williams	2017–22	159
Minutes played	Trent Frazier	2017–22	4,881
Points	Deon Thomas	1990–94	2,129
Assists	Bruce Douglas	1982–86	765
Steals	Bruce Douglas	1982–86	324
Blocks	Nnanna Egwu	2011–15	201
Field goals made	Deon Thomas	1990–94	803
Field goals attempted	Eddie Johnson	1977–81	1,658
Field goal percentage	Ken Norman	1984–87	.609
Three-pointers made	Cory Bradford	1997–02	327
Three-pointers attempted	Trent Frazier	2017–22	882
Three-point percentage	Cory Bradford	1997–02	.388
Free throws made	Kiwane Garris	1993–97	615
Free throws attempted	Deon Thomas	1990–94	790
Free throw percentage	Kiwane Garris	1993–97	.830

=== Single-season leaders ===
Most minutes played
Player	Season	Stat
Deron Williams	2004–05	1,315
Luther Head	2004–05	1,297
Dee Brown	2004–05	1,272
Demetri McCamey	2009–10	1,241
D. J. Richardson	2012–13	1,218

Most points scored
Player	Season	Stat
Terrence Shannon Jr.	2023–24	736
Don Freeman	1965–66	668
Keaton Wagler	2025–26	663
Andy Kaufmann	1990–91	660
Nick Anderson	1988–89	647

Most assists
Player	Season	Stat
Deron Williams	2004–05	264
Demetri McCamey	2009–10	254
Demetri McCamey	2010–11	208
Bruce Douglas	1984–85	200
Bruce Douglas	1985–86	199

Most steals
Player	Season	Stat
Kenny Battle	1988–89	89
Bruce Douglas	1985–86	88
Bruce Douglas	1984–85	85
Bruce Douglas	1982–83	78
Frank Williams	1999–2000	74

Most shots blocked
Player	Season	Stat
Derek Holcomb	1978–79	86
Nnanna Egwu	2013–14	73
Meyers Leonard	2011–12	60
Mike Tisdale	2009–10	59
Nnanna Egwu	2014–15	59

Most field goals made
Player	Season	Stat
Eddie Johnson	1979–80	266
Nick Anderson	1988–89	262
Don Freeman	1965–66	258
Ken Norman	1986–87	256
Nick Weatherspoon	1972–73	247

Most field goals attempted
Player	Season	Stat
Don Freeman	1965–66	595
Eddie Johnson	1979–80	576
Dave Scholz	1967–68	541
Nick Weatherspoon	1972–73	540
Johnny Kerr	1953–54	520

Highest field goal percentage (min. 170 attempts)
Player	Season	Stat
Robert Archibald	2001–02	.659
Kofi Cockburn	2020–21	.654
Ken Norman	1985–86	.641
Dain Dainja	2022–23	.636
James Augustine	2003–04	.635

Most three-pointers made
Player	Season	Stat
Luther Head	2004–05	116

Most three-pointers attempted
Player	Season	Stat
Luther Head	2004–05	283

Highest three-point percentage
Player	Season	Stat
Tom Michael	1991–92	49.3%

Most free throws made
Player	Season	Stat
Terrence Shannon Jr.	2023–24	221

Most free throws attempted
Player	Season	Stat
Terrence Shannon Jr.	2023–24	276

Highest free throw percentage
Player	Season	Stat
Marcus Domask	2023–24	87.5%

=== Game leaders ===
- Points: Dave Downey (53, 1963)
- Assists: Demetri McCamey (16, 2010), Tony Wysinger (16, 1986)
- Rebounds: Skip Thoren (24, 1963)
- Steals: Bruce Douglas (8, 1984)
- Blocks: Derek Holcomb (11, 1978)

=== Career milestones ===
1,500 points
Years	Player	Points
1991–94	Deon Thomas	2,129
1994–97	Kiwane Garris	1,948
2014–17	Malcolm Hill	1,817
2003–06	Dee Brown	1,812
2017–22	Trent Frazier	1,794
2000–03	Brian Cook	1,748
1999–02	Cory Bradford	1,735
2008–11	Demetri McCamey	1,718
1978–81	Eddie Johnson	1,692
2010–13	Brandon Paul	1,654
1978–81	Mark Smith	1,653
2019-22	Kofi Cockburn	1,546
1989–93	Andy Kaufmann	1,533
2018-21	Ayo Dosunmu	1,504

200 three-point field goals
Years	Player	Three-pointers
1999–02	Cory Bradford	327
2017–22	Trent Frazier	310
2003–06	Dee Brown	299
2010–13	D.J. Richardson	278
1993–96	Richard Keene	237
2008–11	Demetri McCamey	236
2004–07	Rich McBride	216
2010–13	Brandon Paul	211
2002–05	Luther Head	209

500 assists
Years	Player	Assists
1983–86	Bruce Douglas	765
2008–11	Demetri McCamey	733
2003–06	Dee Brown	674
2003–05	Deron Williams	594
1994–97	Kiwane Garris	502

750 rebounds
Years	Player	Rebounds
2003–06	James Augustine	1,023
2008–11	Mike Davis	909
2019-22	Kofi Cockburn	861
1983–86	Efrem Winters	853
1991–94	Deon Thomas	846
1978–81	Eddie Johnson	831
1963–65	Skip Thoren	830
2000–03	Brian Cook	815
1971–73	Nick Weatherspoon	803
1961–63	Dave Downey	790

150 blocks
Years	Player	Blocks
2012–15	Nnanna Egwu	201
1991–94	Deon Thomas	177
2008–11	Mike Tisdale	176
1979–81	Derek Holcomb	174
1979–82	James Griffin	156

Source for all statistical leaders

== Illini in the NBA and professional basketball ==
Fighting Illini in the NBA
NBA draft selections
Total selected:	81
1st round:	21
Lottery (top-14) picks:	11
Notable Achievements
Olympic gold medals:	2
NBA championships:	4
Hall-of-fame draftees:	2

=== First round NBA draft picks ===
Draft year	Pick	Player	Selected by	Professional career
1951	9	Don Sunderlage	Philadelphia Warriors	1953–1955
1954	9	Johnny Kerr	Syracuse Nationals	1954–1966
1957	7	George Bon Salle	Syracuse Nationals	1957–1962
1970	17	Mike Price	New York Knicks	1970–1973
1973	13	Nick Weatherspoon	Capital Bullets	1973–1980
1983	11	Derek Harper	Dallas Mavericks	1983–1999
1987	19	Ken Norman	Los Angeles Clippers	1987–1997
1989	11	Nick Anderson	Orlando Magic	1989–2002
1989	27	Kenny Battle	Detroit Pistons	1989–2000
1990	5	Kendall Gill	Charlotte Hornets	1990–2005
2002	25	Frank Williams	Denver Nuggets	2002–2010
2002	24	Brian Cook	Los Angeles Lakers	2003–2015
2005	3	Deron Williams	Utah Jazz	2005–2017
2005	24	Luther Head	Houston Rockets	2005–2018
2012	11	Meyers Leonard	Portland Trail Blazers	2012–2023
2024	27	Terrence Shannon Jr.	Minnesota Timberwolves	2024–present
2025	20	Kasparas Jakučionis	Miami Heat	2025–present
2025	21	Will Riley	Utah Jazz	2025–present
2026	5	Keaton Wagler	Los Angeles Clippers	2026–present

=== Fighting Illini playing in the NBA ===
Position	Name	Height	Weight (lbs.)	Hometown	Draft year	Pick	Current NBA team
SG/PG	Keaton Wagler	6'6"	175	Shawnee, Kansas	2026	5th	Los Angeles Clipper
PG/SG	Kasparas Jakučionis	6'6"	200	Vilnius, Lithuania	2025	20th	Miami Heat
SF	Will Riley	6'8"	180	Kitchener, Ontario, Canada	2025	21st	Washington Wizards
SG	Terrence Shannon Jr.	6'6"	215	Chicago, Illinois	2024	27th	Minnesota Timberwolves
PG	Ayo Dosunmu	6'5"	200	Chicago, Illinois	2021	38th	Minnesota Timberwolves

=== Fighting Illini playing in the NBA G League ===
Position	Name	Height	Weight (lbs.)	Hometown	Draft year	Pick	Current G League team
SG	Justin Harmon	6'4"	180	Chicago, Illinois	2024	Undrafted	Salt Lake City Stars

=== Fighting Illini playing internationally ===
Position	Name	Height	Weight (lbs.)	Hometown	Years with Illinois	Professional team	Country
C	Kofi Cockburn	7'0"	293	Kingston, Jamaica	2019–2022	Seoul Samsung Thunders	South Korea
PG	Andrés Feliz	6'2"	195	Santo Domingo, Dominican Republic	2018–2020	Real Madrid Baloncesto	Spain
PF	Michael Finke	6'10"	220	Champaign, Illinois	2016–2019	Yamagata Wyverns	Japan
PG	Trent Frazier	6'2"	155	Boynton Beach, Florida	2017–2022	BC Zenit Saint Petersburg	Russia
SG	Jacob Grandison	6'6"	190	San Francisco, California	2020–2022	CB Menorca	Spain
G/F	Myke Henry	6'6"	230	Chicago, Illinois	2011–2013	Satria Muda Pertamina	Indonesia
SG	Kipper Nichols	6'6"	220	Cleveland, Ohio	2017–2020	Sheffield Sharks	England
G	Te'Jon Lucas	6'1"	187	Milwaukee, Wisconsin	2016–2018	Bristol Flyers	England
SG	Kendrick Nunn	6'2"	190	Chicago, Illinois	2013–2016	Panathinaikos B.C.	Greece
G	Brandon Paul	6'4"	200	Gurnee, Illinois	2009–2013	Élan Chalon	France
G	Rayvonte Rice	6'5"	234	Champaign, Illinois	2013–2015	Guangdong Southern Tigers	China
SG	Jamar Smith	6'3"	185	Peoria, Illinois	2006–2007	Pallacanestro Reggiana	Italy
SG	Mark Smith	6'4"	225	Decatur, Illinois	2017–2018	Nagasaki Velca	Japan
SG	Alfonso Plummer	6'1"	180	Fajardo, Puerto Rico	2021–2022	Ratiopharm Ulm	Germany
SG/SF	Marcus Domask	6'6"	215	Waupun, Wisconsin	2023–2024	Skyliners Frankfurt	Germany
PF	Giorgi Bezhanishvili	6'9"	245	Rustavi, Georgia	2018–2021	Fundación CB Granada	Spain
SF/PF	Quincy Guerrier	6'8"	220	Montreal, Quebec	2023–2024	Montreal Alliance	Canada

=== Fighting Illini currently coaching ===
Name	Years with Illinois	Current Team	Position	League
Leron Black	2014–18	Rip City Remix	Assistant coach	NBA G League
Dee Brown	2002–06	Roosevelt	Head coach	Great Lakes Intercollegiate Athletic Conference
Chester Frazier	2005-09	Virginia Tech	Associate head coach	Atlantic Coast Conference
Jerrance Howard	2000–04	Arizona State	Assistant coach	Big 12 Conference
Roger Powell	2001–05	Valparaiso	Head coach	Missouri Valley Conference
Brian Randle	2003–08	Phoenix Suns	Assistant coach	NBA
Tyler Underwood	2017-21	Illinois	Assistant coach	Big Ten Conference

=== Fighting Illini basketball media members ===
Name	Years with Illinois	Media outlet	Role	Current team
Nick Anderson	1987–1989	Fox Sports Florida	Commentator	Orlando Magic
Stephen Bardo	1986–1990	Big Ten Network	College basketball analyst	Big Ten Conference
Kendall Gill	1986–1990	NBC Sports Chicago	Commentator	Chicago Bulls
Derek Harper	1980–1983	Fox Sports Southwest	Color commentator	Dallas Mavericks
Eddie Johnson	1977–1981	Fox Sports Arizona	Play-by-play commentator	Phoenix Suns
Deon Thomas	1991–1994	Fighting Illini Sports Network	Color commentator	Fighting Illini Men's basketball

== High school honors ==
=== Jordan Brand Classic ===
The following six Jordan Brand Classic participants have played for Illinois:

Year	Player	High school	Hometown
2002	Dee Brown	Proviso East	Maywood, Illinois
2015	Jalen Coleman-Lands	La Lumiere School	Indianapolis, Indiana
2018	Ayo Dosunmu	Morgan Park High School	Chicago, Illinois
2020	Adam Miller	Morgan Park High School	Peoria, Illinois
2022	Skyy Clark	Montverde Academy	Nashville, Tennessee
2022	Ty Rodgers	Thornton Township High School	Grand Blanc, Michigan

=== Nike Hoop Summit ===
The following 9 Fighting Illini have played in the Nike Hoop Summit:

Year	Player	High school	Hometown
2010	Meyers Leonard	Robinson High School	Robinson, Illinois
2016	Andrés Feliz	West Oaks Academy	Santo Domingo, Dominican Republic
2018	Kofi Cockburn	Christ the King Regional High School	Kingston, Jamaica
2019	Kofi Cockburn	Oak Hill Academy	Kingston, Jamaica
2019	Andre Curbelo	Long Island Lutheran	Vega Baja, Puerto Rico
2020	Adam Miller	Morgan Park High School	Peoria, Illinois
2023	Andrej Stojaković	Jesuit	Thessaloniki, Greece
2024	Morez Johnson	Thornton Township HS	Harvey, Illinois
2024	Kasparas Jakucionis	FC Barcelona Bàsquet	Vilnius, Lithuania
2025	David Mirkovic	SC Derby	Podgorica, Montenegro

=== McDonald's All-Americans ===
The following 14 McDonald's All-Americans have played for Illinois:

Year	Player	High school	Hometown
1980	Derek Harper	North Shore (FL)	Royston, Georgia
1982	Bruce Douglas	Quincy Senior High School	Quincy, Illinois
1982	Efrem Winters	King College Prep	Chicago
1985	Lowell Hamilton	Providence St. Mel School	Chicago
1986	Nick Anderson	Simeon Career Academy	Chicago
1987	Marcus Liberty	King College Prep	Chicago
1989	Deon Thomas	Simeon Career Academy	Chicago
1992	Richard Keene	Collinsville High School	Collinsville, Illinois
1997	Marcus Griffin	Manual High School	Peoria, Illinois
1998	Frank Williams	Manual High School	Peoria, Illinois
1999	Brian Cook	Lincoln Community High School	Lincoln, Illinois
2002	Dee Brown	Proviso East	Maywood, Illinois
2010	Jereme Richmond	Waukegan High School	Waukegan, Illinois
2023	Andrej Stojaković	Jesuit	Thessaloniki, Greece

=== Mr. Basketball ===
The following 17 Mr. Basketball award winners have played for Illinois:

Year	Player	High school	Hometown
1982	Bruce Douglas	Quincy Senior High School	Quincy, Illinois
1986	Nick Anderson	Simeon Career Academy	Chicago
1987	Marcus Liberty	King College Prep	Chicago
1989	Deon Thomas	Simeon Career Academy	Chicago
1994	Jarrod Gee	St. Martin de Porres	Chicago
1997	Sergio McClain	Manual High School	Peoria, Illinois
1998	Frank Williams	Manual High School	Peoria, Illinois
1999	Brian Cook	Lincoln Community High School	Lincoln, Illinois
2002	Dee Brown	Proviso East	Maywood, Illinois
2009	Brandon Paul	Warren Township High School	Gurnee, Illinois
2010	Jereme Richmond	Waukegan High School	Waukegan, Illinois
2014	Leron Black	White Station High School	Memphis, Tennessee
2017	Mark Smith	Edwardsville High School	Edwardsville, Illinois
2019	Marcus Domask	Waupun Area	Waupun, Wisconsin
2020	Adam Miller	Morgan Park High School	Chicago
2021	Brandin Podziemski	St. John's Northwestern Military Academy	Muskego, Wisconsin
2024	Morez Johnson	Thornton Township High School	Chicago

== International honors ==
=== Olympians ===
Year	Player	Event	Country	Medal
1948 London	Dwight Eddleman	High jump	United States	4th
1992 Barcelona	Jens Kujawa	Basketball	Germany	7th
2008 Beijing	Deron Williams	Basketball	United States	Gold medal
2012 London	Robert Archibald	Basketball	Great Britain (United Kingdom)	9th
2012 London	Deron Williams	Basketball	United States	Gold medal

=== International championships ===
Year	Player	Event	Country	Medal	Ref
1959 Chicago	George Bon Salle	Pan American Games	United States	Gold medal	
1970 Yugoslavia	Tal Brody	FIBA World Championship	United States	5th	
1974 Iran	Tal Brody	Basketball at the 1974 Asian Games	Israel	Gold medal	
1974 Puerto Rico	Rick Schmidt	FIBA World Championship	United States	Bronze medal	
1979 Mexico	Craig Tucker	Universiade	United States	Gold medal	
1984 Sweden	Jens Kujawa	FIBA Europe Under-18 Championship	West Germany	5th	
1987 Greece	Jens Kujawa	FIBA EuroBasket	West Germany	4th	
1993 Germany	Jens Kujawa	FIBA EuroBasket	Germany	Gold medal	
1997 Sicily	Jerry Hester	Universiade	United States	Gold medal	
1998 Greece	Kiwane Garris	FIBA World Championship	United States	Bronze medal	
1999 Spain	Cory Bradford	Universiade	United States	Gold medal	
2000 Brazil	Brian Cook	FIBA Americas Under-20 Championship	United States	Silver medal	
2001 Japan	Brian Cook	FIBA Under-21 World Championship	United States	Gold medal	
2002 Venezuela	Dee Brown	FIBA Americas U18 Championship	United States	Bronze medal	
2002 Venezuela	Deron Williams	FIBA Americas U18 Championship	United States	Bronze medal	
2003 Greece	Dee Brown	FIBA Under-19 Basketball World Cup	United States	5th	
2003 Greece	Deron Williams	FIBA Under-19 Basketball World Cup	United States	5th	
2007 Las Vegas	Deron Williams	FIBA AmeriCup	United States	Gold medal	
2009 Poland	Robert Archibald	FIBA EuroBasket	Great Britain (United Kingdom)	14th	
2010 San Antonio	Jereme Richmond	FIBA Americas U18 Championship	United States	Gold medal	
2011 Lithuania	Robert Archibald	FIBA EuroBasket	Great Britain (United Kingdom)	13th	
2011 Latvia	Meyers Leonard	FIBA Under-19 Basketball World Cup	United States	5th	
2011 Mexico	Kendrick Nunn	FIBA Americas Under-16 Championship	United States	Gold medal	
2012 Lithuania	Kendrick Nunn	FIBA Under-17 Basketball World Cup	United States	Gold medal	
2013 Puerto Rico	Andrés Feliz	Centrobasket U17 Championship	Dominican Republic	Gold medal	
2014 Colorado Springs	Andrés Feliz	FIBA Americas Under-18 Championship	Dominican Republic	Bronze medal	
2015 Greece	Andrés Feliz	FIBA Under-19 Basketball World Cup	Dominican Republic	13th	
2015 Toronto	Andrés Feliz	Pan American Games	Dominican Republic	4th	
2016 Puerto Rico	André Curbelo	Centrobasket U15 Championship	Puerto Rico	Gold medal	
2016 China	Myke Henry	FIBA 3x3 World Cup	United States	Silver medal	
2017 Argentina	André Curbelo	FIBA Americas Under-16 Championship	Puerto Rico	Bronze medal	
2018 Argentina	André Curbelo	FIBA Under-17 World Cup	Puerto Rico	Bronze medal	
2018 Canada	Ayo Dosunmu	FIBA Americas Under-18 Championship	United States	Gold medal	
2018 Serbia	Tomislav Ivišić	FIBA U16 European Championship	Croatia	Gold medal	
2019 Italy	Tomislav Ivišić	FIBA U16 European Championship	Croatia	8th	
2019 Italy	Zvonimir Ivišić	FIBA U16 European Championship	Croatia	8th	
2019 Greece	André Curbelo	FIBA Under-19 World Cup	Puerto Rico	6th	
2019 Puerto Rico	RJ Meléndez	Centrobasket U17 Championship	Puerto Rico	Silver medal	
2021 Latvia	Adam Miller	FIBA Under-19 Basketball World Cup	United States	Gold medal	
2022 Tijuana	Ty Rodgers	FIBA Under-18 Americas Championship	United States	Gold medal	
2022 North Macedonia	Kasparas Jakučionis	FIBA U16 EuroBasket	Lithuania	Gold medal	
2023 Greece	Tomislav Ivišić	FIBA U20 European Championship	Croatia	14th	
2023 Greece	Zvonimir Ivišić	FIBA U20 European Championship	Croatia	14th	
2023 Serbia	Kasparas Jakučionis	FIBA U18 EuroBasket	Lithuania	11th	
2024 Buenos Aires	Morez Johnson Jr.	FIBA Under-18 Americas Championship	United States	Gold medal	
2024 Finland	Kasparas Jakučionis	FIBA U18 EuroBasket	Lithuania	6th	
2026 Mexico	Quentin Coleman	FIBA U18 AmeriCup	United States	Silver medal	

== Illinois honored players ==
=== Honored jerseys ===
The University of Illinois has honored its most decorated basketball players in school history by hanging a banner with their name and number from the rafters of State Farm Center, along with their career years in terms of spring semesters. As of 2025, a total of 36 players have had their jersey honored.

To have an honored jersey hung in the State Farm Center, a player must have achieved one of the following criteria:

1) National Player of the Year

2) Enshrined in the National Basketball Hall of Fame

3) Big Ten Player of the Year

4) Consensus All-American (consensus teams before 1929 are retrospective and thus not considered; see "Consensus teams" section of NCAA Men's Basketball All-Americans)

5) Illinois All-Century Team member

6) Individual whose pioneering efforts made a significant impact on Illinois and international basketball

No.	Player	Pos.	Career	National POY	National HOF	US Olympian	Big Ten POY	Consensus All-American	Illinois All-Century (voted 2004)	Basketball pioneer
1	Ray Woods	G	1915–17	✓					✓	
2	Chuck Carney	F	1920–22	✓					✓	
19	Bill Hapac	F	1938–40					✓		
47	Andy Phillip	F	1942–43, 1947	✓	✓		✓	✓	✓	
25	Gene Vance	G	1942–43, 1947						✓	
14	Walt Kirk	G	1942–43, 1947					✓		
40	Dwight "Dike" Eddleman	F	1947–49			✓	✓		✓	
33	Bill Erickson	G	1947–50					✓		
11	Don Sunderlage	G	1949–51				✓			
37	Rod Fletcher	G	1950–52					✓		
22	Johnny "Red" Kerr	C	1952–54				✓		✓	
35	Govoner Vaughn	F	1958–60							✓
30	Mannie Jackson	G	1958–60		✓					✓
23	Jerry Colangelo	G	1960–62		✓					✓
40	Dave Downey	F	1961–63						✓	
35	Duane "Skip" Thoren	C	1963–65						✓	
12	Tal Brody	G	1963–65							✓
15	Donnie Freeman	F	1963–66						✓	
24	Jim Dawson	G	1965–67				✓			
12	Nick Weatherspoon	F	1971–73						✓	
33	Eddie Johnson	F	1978–81						✓	
12	Derek Harper	G	1981–83						✓	
25	Bruce Douglas	G	1983–86						✓	
33	Ken Norman	F	1985–87					✓	✓	
33	Kenny Battle	F	1988–89						✓	
25	Nick Anderson	F	1988–89						✓	
13	Kendall Gill	G	1987–90					✓	✓	
25	Deon Thomas	F/C	1991–94						✓	
20	Frank Williams	G	2000–02				✓		✓	
34	Brian Cook	F	2000–03				✓		✓	
4	Luther Head	G	2002–05					✓		
5	Deron Williams	G	2003–05		✓	✓		✓		
11	Dee Brown	G	2003–06	✓			✓	✓		
11	Ayo Dosunmu	G	2019–21					✓		
21	Kofi Cockburn	C	2020–22					✓		
0	Terrence Shannon Jr.	G	2023–24							✓

Honored jerseys
#1; RAY; WOODS; 1915–17	#1; CHUCK; CARNEY; 1920–22	#19; BILL; HAPAC; 1938–40	#47; ANDY; PHILLIP; 1942–43, 1947	#25; GENE; VANCE; 1942–43, 1947	#14; WALT; KIRK; 1944–45, 1947	#40; DWIGHT "DIKE"; EDDLEMAN; 1947–49
#33; BILL; ERICKSON; 1947–50	#11; DON; SUNDERLAGE; 1949–51	#37; ROD; FLETCHER; 1950–52	#22; JOHN "RED"; KERR; 1952–54	#35; GOVONER; VAUGHN; 1958–60	#30; MANNIE; JACKSON; 1958–60	#23; JERRY; COLANGELO; 1960–62
#40; DAVE; DOWNEY; 1961-63	#35; DUANE "SKIP"; THOREN; 1963–65	#12; TAL; BRODY; 1963–65	#15; DON; FREEMAN; 1964–66	#24; JIM; DAWSON; 1965–67	#12; NICK; WEATHERSPOON; 1971–73	#33; EDDIE; JOHNSON; 1978–81
#12; DEREK; HARPER; 1981–83	#25; BRUCE; DOUGLAS; 1983–86	#33; KEN; NORMAN; 1985–87	#33; KENNY; BATTLE; 1988–89	#25; NICK; ANDERSON; 1988–89	#13; KENDALL; GILL; 1987–90	#25; DEON; THOMAS; 1991–94
#30; FRANK; WILLIAMS; 2000–02	#34; BRIAN; COOK; 2000–03	#4; LUTHER; HEAD; 2002–05	#5; DERON; WILLIAMS; 2003–05	#11; DEE; BROWN; 2003–06	#11; AYO; DOSUNMU; 2019–21	#21; KOFI; COCKBURN; 2020–22
#0; TERRENCE; SHANNON JR. 2023–24

=== Dike Eddleman Award ===
The University of Illinois Athlete of the Year was first awarded in 1940. The award was annually given to a male student-athlete until it was discontinued in 1973. Revived in 1983, the University of Illinois now recognizes both male and female athletes who have distinguished themselves in athletic achievement. In 1993, the awards were named in honor of former Olympian Dwight "Dike" Eddleman, who participated in basketball, football and track and field in 1943 and 1946–49, earning a combined 11 varsity letters during that time. The following list includes Illini basketball players who earned the award.

Player	Years played	Year awarded
Bill Hapac	1937–40	1940
John Drish	1937–41	1941
Andy Phillip	1942–43, 1947	1942, 1943
Walton Kirk	1943–47	1945
Dike Eddleman	1945–49	1948, 1949
Don Sunderlage	1948–51	1951
Clive Follmer	1950–53	1953
Paul Judson	1953–56	1955
Doug Mills	1959–62	1962
Jim Dawson	1963–67	1967
Dave Scholz	1966–69	1968, 1969
Mike Price	1967–70	1970
Kendall Gill	1986–90	1990
Deron Williams	2002–05	2005
Ayo Dosunmu	2018-21	2020, 2021
Kofi Cockburn	2019-22	2022
Terrence Shannon Jr.	2022-24	2024
Keaton Wagler	2025-26	2026

== Head-to-head Big Ten records ==
Team	Total meetings	Wins	Losses	Pct.	Home record	Road record	Neutral record
Indiana	183	90	93	.492	54–34	30–57	6–2
Iowa	165	89	76	.539	64–17	23–56	2–3
Maryland	19	7	11	.333	2–4	1–6	4–2
Michigan	175	90	85	.514	57–28	31–52	2–5
Michigan State	123	60	63	.488	39–21	20–39	1–3
Minnesota	195	127	68	.651	74–19	47–48	6–1
Nebraska	27	19	8	.704	14–2	5–5	0–1
Northwestern	182	140	42	.769	71–14	64–28	5–0
Ohio State	187	108	80	.574	62–27	43–49	3–3
Oregon	6	4	2	.667	1-0	1-0	2-2
Penn State	49	30	19	.612	14–8	13–10	3–1
Purdue	193	90	103	.466	59–37	29–63	2–3
Rutgers	14	10	4	.714	6–0	3–3	2–0
UCLA	10	4	6	.400	2-2	2-4	0-0
USC	9	3	6	.333	2-2	0-4	1-0
Washington	3	1	2	.333	1-0	0-1	0-1
Wisconsin	202	113	89	.559	69–28	41–58	3–3

=== Men's basketball records at Kenney Gym and Huff Hall ===
Season	Wins	Losses	Win pct.	Total attendance	Season	Wins	Losses	Win pct.	Total attendance
1905–06	6	0	1.000	N/R	1925–26	6	3	0.667	N/R
1906–07	0	4	0.000	N/R	1926–27	8	3	0.727	61,590
1907–08	3	2	0.600	N/R	1927–28	3	5	0.375	48,202
1908–09	5	1	0.833	N/R	1928–29	8	3	0.727	30,139*
1909–10	3	2	0.600	N/R	1929–30	5	4	0.556	49,418*
1910–11	3	2	0.600	N/R	1930–31	7	3	0.700	52,440
1911–12	4	3	0.571	N/R	1931–32	8	2	0.800	57,000
1912–13	6	2	0.750	N/R	1932–33	8	3	0.727	34,500*
1913–14	5	2	0.714	N/R	1933–34	9	1	0.900	55,500
1914–15	9	0	1.000	N/R	1934–35	8	2	0.800	62,000
1915–16	6	1	0.857	16,644*	1935–36	7	3	0.700	78,028
1916–17	9	1	0.900	6,417*	1936–37	7	2	0.778	63,238
1917–18	7	1	0.875	5,066*	1937–38	7	2	0.778	63,600
1918–19	3	5	0.375	10,739	1938–39	9	1	0.900	57,933
1919–20	6	1	0.857	24,250*	1939–40	10	1	0.909	55,513
1920–21	6	4	0.600	34,875	1940–41	8	2	0.800	52,751
1921–22	10	2	0.833	40,112	1941–42	12	1	0.923	65,357
1922–23	6	3	0.667	8,424*	1942–43	10	0	1.000	62,648
1923–24	8	3	0.727	41,848	1943–44	6	4	0.600	29,812
1924–25	9	0	1.000	36,222	1944–45	7	3	0.700	44,951
Kenney Gym totals	94	39	.707	224,597*	1945–46	11	2	0.846	66,553
Kenney Gym facts					1946–47	10	1	0.909	77,808*
Fighting Illini played 20 years in Kenney Gym					1947–48	11	1	0.917	78,388
Attendance averaged 2,739 fans per game					1948–49	14	0	1.000	49,036*
Single game attendance record: January 24, 1925 vs. Iowa–4,725					1949–50	11	2	0.846	83,736
Hosted 3 Big Ten Champions (1915, 1917, 1924)					1950–51	12	1	0.923	75,116
Hosted 1 National Champion (1915)					1951–52	12	0	1.000	57,788*
Produced 6 All-Americans					1952–53	12	1	0.923	79,957*
Developed 2 National Players of the Year					1953–54	10	3	0.769	77,378
					1954–55	9	2	0.818	64,721
Huff Hall facts					1955–56	12	0	1.000	63,912
Fighting Illini played 38 years in Huff Hall					1956–57	9	2	0.818	68,448
Attendance averaged 7,025 fans per game					1957–58	10	3	0.769	76,032
Single game attendance record: February 22, 1937 vs. Wisconsin–9,000					1958–59	9	3	0.750	68,292
Hosted 8 Big Ten Champions (1935, 1937, 1942, 1943, 1949, 1951, 1952, 1963)					1959–60	10	2	0.833	74,719
Hosted 3 Final Four teams (1949, 1951, 1952)					1960–61	7	3	0.700	60,457
Produced 33 All-Americans					1961–62	8	4	0.667	75,376
Developed 1 National Player of the Year					1962–63**	9	0	1.000	61,025
Combined totals	433	116	.789	2,507,959*	Huff Hall totals	339	77	.815	2,283,362*

Notes:

- *Denotes incomplete or partial records.
- **Played 9 games at Huff Hall but played final 2 games at Assembly Hall.
- (N/R) denotes no records

== See also ==
- Illinois Fighting Illini women's basketball
- NCAA Men's Division I Final Four appearances by coaches
- Basketball in the United States
- College basketball
