= Art Mathisen =

American basketball player

Personal information
- Born: February 27, 1920 Dwight, Illinois, U.S.
- Died: January 5, 2004 (aged 83) Danville, Illinois, U.S.
- Listed height: 6 ft 5 in (1.96 m)

Career information
- High school: Dwight (Dwight, Illinois)
- College: Illinois (1940–1943)
- Position: Center
- Number: 19
- Coaching career: 1950–1958

Career history

Coaching
- 1950–1958: Danville HS

Career highlights
- 2× Honorable Mention All-American – SN (1942, 1943); First-team All-Big Ten (1943)

Arthur Fremont Mathisen (February 27, 1920 – January 5, 2004) was an American college basketball standout for Illinois in the 1940s. A center, Mathison led the Fighting Illini in rebounding while scoring over 500 points in his three years of varsity play earning a varsity letter each year. Graduating from Dwight High School, Mathisen was the son of James Mathisen and Mary (Jensen) Mathisen, marrying Virginia Mae DeLong in 1946. While in high school, Mathisen led his basketball team to the "Sweet Sixteen" of the IHSA state tournament in 1939.

Mathisen enrolled at the University of Illinois in the fall of 1939, playing on the freshman basketball team. In his sophomore year he was the starting center of the 1940–41 Fighting Illini team that finished third in the Big Ten with a 13–7 record. As a junior, Mathisen maintained his starting center role on a team that finished as conference champions and an overall record of 18–5. The pinnacle of his career was the 1942–43 season; Mathisen was named team captain, and the Illini finished their schedule with an overall record of 17–1 and a conference record of 12–0 winning the Big Ten championship. In addition, this team was retroactively listed as the top team of the season by the Premo-Porretta Power Poll. Even though they won the conference championship, Illinois elected not to play in the 1943 NCAA basketball tournament because three starters were drafted into active duty.

== Military service and coaching career ==
After completing his undergraduate studies, Mathisen served in the United States Army for three years, of which a year and a half was spent in the European Theater during World War II. Upon his return, Mathisen began a 30-year career with Danville High School in Danville, Illinois, teaching from 1950 to 1968 and becoming school principal from 1969 until his retirement in 1980. During his tenure at Danville, Mathisen was head coach of several sports, including; baseball (1959–1960), golf (1952–1962) and basketball (1950–1958). Mathisen's basketball teams made the IHSA "Sweet Sixteen" in 1951 and in 1954. In 1973, Mathisen was inducted into the Illinois Basketball Coaches Association's Hall of Fame as a player.
