= Ken Menke =

American basketball player (1922–2002)

- Menke at Illinois

Personal information
- Born: October 2, 1922 East Dundee, Illinois, U.S.
- Died: September 2, 2002 (aged 79)
- Listed height: 6 ft 2 in (1.88 m)
- Listed weight: 168 lb (76 kg)

Career information
- High school: Dundee (Dundee, Illinois)
- College: Illinois (1941–1943, 1946–1947)
- NBA draft: 1947: undrafted
- Position: Guard

Career history
- 1947–1948: Fort Wayne Zollner Pistons
- 1950: Waterloo Hawks

Career highlights
- Second-team All-Big Ten (1942)
- Stats at NBA.com
- Stats at Basketball Reference

Kenneth Howard Menke (October 2, 1922 – September 2, 2002) was an American professional basketball player. He played in the National Basketball League for the Fort Wayne Zollner Pistons in 1947–48 and the Waterloo Hawks in the National Basketball Association, during the latter half of the 1949–50 season.

== Career statistics ==
Legend
GP	Games played	GS	Games started	MPG	Minutes per game
FG%	Field goal percentage	3P%	3-point field goal percentage	FT%	Free throw percentage
RPG	Rebounds per game	APG	Assists per game	SPG	Steals per game
BPG	Blocks per game	PPG	Points per game	**Bold**	Career high

=== NBA ===
==== Regular season ====
Year	Team	GP	FG%	FT%	APG	PPG
1949–50	Waterloo	6	.353	.375	1.2	2.5
