= 1940–41 NCAA men's basketball season =

Men's collegiate basketball season

- NCAA Tournament: 1941
- Tournament dates: March 21 – 29, 1941
- National Championship: Municipal Auditorium; Kansas City, Missouri
- NCAA Champions: Wisconsin Badgers
- Helms National Champions: Wisconsin Badgers (retroactive selection in 1943)
- Other champions: LIU Sharks (NIT)
- Player of the Year (Helms): George Glamack, North Carolina Tar Heels (retroactive selection in 1944)

The 1940–41 NCAA men's basketball season began in December 1940, progressed through the regular season and conference tournaments, and concluded with the 1941 NCAA basketball tournament championship game on March 29, 1941, at Municipal Auditorium in Kansas City, Missouri. The Wisconsin Badgers won their first NCAA national championship with a 39–34 victory over the Washington State Cougars.

== Season headlines ==
- The Border Conference and the Metropolitan New York Conference did not play as conferences during the season. Their members competed as independents.
- The National Invitation Tournament — considered by some until at least the mid-1950s to be more prestigious than the NCAA tournament — expanded from six to eight teams.
- The National Association of Basketball Coaches turned over operation of the NCAA tournament to the NCAA itself.
- George Glamack of North Carolina became the first player to score 30 or more points in an NCAA tournament game, scoring 31 points against Dartmouth in a regional third-place game of the 1941 NCAA basketball tournament on March 22, 1941.
- In February 1943, the Helms Athletic Foundation retroactively selected Wisconsin as its national champion for the 1940–41 season.
- In 1995, the Premo-Porretta Power Poll retroactively selected Long Island as its top-ranked team for the 1940–41 season.

== Conference membership changes ==
School	Former conference	New conference
Sewanee Tigers	Southeastern Conference	Independent

== Regular season ==
=== Conferences ===
==== Conference winners and tournaments ====
Conference	Regular season winner	Conference player of the year	Conference tournament	Tournament venue (City)	Tournament winner
Big Six Conference	Iowa State & Kansas	None selected	No Tournament		
Big Ten Conference	Wisconsin	None selected	No Tournament		
Border Conference	Did not play as conference				
Eastern Intercollegiate Basketball League	Dartmouth	None selected	No Tournament		
Metropolitan New York Conference	Did not play as conference				
Missouri Valley Conference	Creighton	None selected	No Tournament		
Mountain States (Skyline) Conference	Wyoming		No Tournament		
New England Conference	Connecticut & Rhode Island State		No Tournament		
Pacific Coast Conference	Washington State (North); Stanford (South)		No Tournament; Washington State defeated Stanford in best-of-three conference championship playoff series		
Southeastern Conference	Tennessee	None selected	1941 SEC men's basketball tournament	Jefferson County Armory, (Louisville, Kentucky)	Tennessee
Southern Conference	North Carolina	None selected	1941 Southern Conference men's basketball tournament	Thompson Gym (Raleigh, North Carolina)	Duke
Southwest Conference	Arkansas	None selected	No Tournament		

==== Conference standings ====
1940–41 Big Six Conference men's basketball standings
	Conf.				Overall
Team	W		L	PCT	W		L	PCT
Iowa State	7	–	3	.700	15	–	4	.789
Kansas	7	–	3	.700	12	–	6	.667
Nebraska	6	–	4	.600	8	–	10	.444
Oklahoma	5	–	5	.500	6	–	12	.333
Kansas State	3	–	7	.300	6	–	12	.333
Missouri	2	–	8	.200	6	–	10	.375

1940–41 Big Ten Conference men's basketball standings
	Conf.				Overall
Team	W		L	PCT	W		L	PCT
Wisconsin	11	–	1	.917	20	–	3	.870
Indiana	10	–	2	.833	17	–	3	.850
Illinois	7	–	5	.583	13	–	7	.650
Minnesota	7	–	5	.583	11	–	9	.550
Ohio State	7	–	5	.583	10	–	10	.500
Purdue	6	–	6	.500	13	–	7	.650
Michigan	5	–	7	.417	9	–	10	.474
Iowa	4	–	8	.333	12	–	8	.600
Northwestern	3	–	9	.250	7	–	11	.389
Chicago	0	–	12	.000	4	–	16	.200

1940–41 Eastern Intercollegiate Basketball League standings
	Conf.				Overall
Team	W		L	PCT	W		L	PCT
Dartmouth	10	–	2	.833	19	–	5	.792
Cornell	9	–	3	.750	17	–	6	.739
Columbia	8	–	4	.667	11	–	5	.688
Harvard	4	–	8	.333	10	–	9	.526
Yale	4	–	8	.333	10	–	12	.455
Princeton	4	–	8	.333	10	–	13	.435
Penn	3	–	9	.250	5	–	12	.294

1940–41 Missouri Valley Conference men's basketball standings
	Conf.				Overall
Team	W		L	PCT	W		L	PCT
Creighton	9	–	3	.750	18	–	7	.720
Oklahoma A&M	8	–	4	.667	18	–	7	.720
Tulsa	7	–	5	.583	12	–	9	.571
Washington University	6	–	6	.500	9	–	8	.529
Drake	6	–	6	.500	9	–	11	.450
Washburn	4	–	8	.333	7	–	12	.368
Saint Louis	2	–	10	.167	3	–	14	.176

1940–41 Mountain States Conference men's basketball standings
	Conf.				Overall
Team	W		L	PCT	W		L	PCT
Wyoming	10	–	2	.833	14	–	6	.700
Utah	9	–	3	.750	14	–	7	.667
Colorado	7	–	5	.583	10	–	6	.625
BYU	6	–	6	.500	14	–	9	.609
Colorado State	4	–	8	.333	10	–	9	.526
Denver	4	–	8	.333	8	–	9	.471
Utah State	2	–	10	.167	5	–	16	.238

1940–41 New England Conference men's basketball standings
	Conf.				Overall
Team	W		L	PCT	W		L	PCT
Connecticut	7	–	1	.875	14	–	2	.875
Rhode Island State	7	–	1	.875	21	–	4	.840
New Hampshire	3	–	5	.375	10	–	8	.556
Maine	2	–	6	.250	4	–	8	.333
Northeastern	1	–	7	.125	3	–	13	.188

1940–41 Pacific Coast Conference men's basketball standings
	Conf.				Overall
Team	W		L	PCT	W		L	PCT
North
Washington State †	13	–	3	.813	26	–	6	.813
Oregon State	9	–	7	.563	19	–	9	.679
Oregon	7	–	9	.438	18	–	18	.500
Washington	7	–	9	.438	12	–	13	.480
Idaho	4	–	12	.250	14	–	15	.483
South
Stanford	10	–	2	.833	21	–	5	.808
California	6	–	6	.500	15	–	12	.556
USC	6	–	6	.500	15	–	10	.600
UCLA	2	–	10	.167	6	–	20	.231
† Conference playoff series winner

1940–41 Rocky Mountain Conference men's basketball standings
	Conf.				Overall
Team	W		L	PCT	W		L	PCT
Colorado State–Greeley	9	–	5	.643	14	–	8	.636
Montana State	5	–	3	.625	13	–	12	.520
Colorado Mines	6	–	6	.500	7	–	8	.467
Western State (CO)	6	–	8	.429	13	–	10	.565
Colorado College	4	–	8	.333	9	–	11	.450

1940–41 Southeastern Conference men's basketball standings
	Conf.				Overall
Team	W		L	PCT	W		L	PCT
Kentucky	8	–	1	.889	17	–	8	.680
Florida	6	–	2	.750	15	–	9	.625
Tennessee †	8	–	3	.727	17	–	5	.773
Alabama	11	–	7	.611	14	–	8	.636
LSU	7	–	5	.583	9	–	9	.500
Auburn	6	–	5	.545	13	–	6	.684
Tulane	6	–	5	.545	8	–	6	.571
Mississippi State	6	–	6	.500	12	–	10	.545
Georgia	6	–	7	.462	13	–	11	.542
Georgia Tech	4	–	8	.333	8	–	11	.421
Vanderbilt	3	–	9	.250	8	–	9	.471
Ole Miss	2	–	15	.118	2	–	18	.100
† Regular-season championship and SEC Tournament winner

1940–41 Southern Conference men's basketball standings
	Conf.				Overall
Team	W		L	PCT	W		L	PCT
North Carolina	14	–	1	.933	19	–	9	.679
South Carolina	8	–	3	.727	15	–	9	.625
William & Mary	8	–	3	.727	15	–	10	.600
Washington and Lee	9	–	4	.692	11	–	11	.500
Duke †	8	–	4	.667	14	–	8	.636
VMI	8	–	4	.667	10	–	6	.625
Richmond	7	–	5	.583	11	–	10	.524
Wake Forest	7	–	6	.538	9	–	9	.500
Clemson	7	–	8	.467	8	–	14	.364
Davidson	5	–	7	.417	11	–	12	.478
North Carolina State	6	–	9	.400	6	–	9	.400
Virginia Tech	4	–	8	.333	8	–	13	.381
The Citadel	1	–	8	.111	5	–	13	.278
Furman	1	–	10	.091	4	–	13	.235
Maryland	0	–	13	.000	1	–	21	.045
† Southern Conference Tournament winner

1940–41 Southwest Conference men's basketball standings
	Conf.				Overall
Team	W		L	PCT	W		L	PCT
Arkansas	12	–	0	1.000	20	–	3	.870
Rice	8	–	4	.667	18	–	6	.750
Texas	7	–	5	.583	14	–	10	.583
SMU	6	–	6	.500	10	–	10	.500
Baylor	6	–	6	.500	10	–	12	.455
Texas A&M	3	–	9	.250	7	–	13	.350
TCU	0	–	12	.000	5	–	16	.238

=== Major independents ===
A total of 73 college teams played as major independents. LIU (25–2) had the best winning percentage (.926) and finished with the most wins.

1940–41 NCAA men's basketball independents standings
	Conf.				Overall
Team	W		L	PCT	W		L	PCT
LIU		–		–	25	–	2	.926
Seton Hall		–		–	20	–	2	.909
Toledo		–		–	21	–	3	.875
Duquesne		–		–	17	–	3	.850
Western Kentucky State		–		–	22	–	4	.846
George Washington		–		–	18	–	4	.818
Loyola (Md.)		–		–	18	–	4	.818
Ohio		–		–	18	–	4	.818
Boston University		–		–	13	–	3	.813
Villanova		–		–	13	–	3	.813
Bradley		–		–	16	–	4	.800
Georgetown		–		–	16	–	4	.800
CCNY		–		–	17	–	5	.773
Notre Dame		–		–	17	–	5	.773
Texas Tech		–		–	19	–	6	.760
Penn State		–		–	15	–	5	.750
Virginia		–		–	18	–	6	.750
Syracuse		–		–	14	–	5	.737
St. Bonaventure		–		–	12	–	5	.706
NYU		–		–	13	–	6	.684
Pittsburgh		–		–	13	–	6	.684
Santa Clara		–		–	15	–	7	.682
St. Joseph's		–		–	12	–	6	.667
Niagara		–		–	13	–	7	.650
Brooklyn		–		–	11	–	6	.647
Michigan State Normal		–		–	11	–	6	.647
St. John's		–		–	11	–	6	.647
Navy		–		–	9	–	5	.643
DePaul		–		–	13	–	8	.619
Loyola (Ill.)		–		–	13	–	8	.619
Arizona		–		–	11	–	7	.611
Manhattan		–		–	11	–	7	.611
Marshall		–		–	14	–	9	.609
Texas State M&M		–		–	14	–	9	.609
Colgate		–		–	9	–	6	.600
Butler		–		–	13	–	9	.591
Xavier		–		–	13	–	9	.591
Bucknell		–		–	10	–	7	.588
Miami (Ohio)		–		–	10	–	7	.588
Indiana State		–		–	11	–	8	.579
La Salle		–		–	11	–	8	.579
Fordham		–		–	12	–	9	.571
Temple		–		–	12	–	9	.571
Muhlenberg		–		–	13	–	10	.565
West Virginia		–		–	13	–	10	.565
Western State Teachers		–		–	10	–	8	.556
Kent State		–		–	12	–	10	.545
New Mexico A&M		–		–	14	–	12	.538
Canisius		–		–	10	–	9	.526
Detroit		–		–	11	–	10	.524
Montana State		–		–	13	–	12	.520
Brown		–		–	10	–	10	.500
Montana		–		–	14	–	14	.500
Arizona State–Flagstaff		–		–	9	–	9	.500
Siena		–		–	9	–	9	.500
St. Francis (NY)		–		–	9	–	9	.500
Bowling Green State		–		–	10	–	11	.476
Wichita Municipal		–		–	9	–	11	.450
Lafayette		–		–	8	–	10	.444
Rutgers		–		–	8	–	10	.444
Arizona State–Tempe		–		–	8	–	11	.421
Dayton		–		–	9	–	14	.391
Holy Cross		–		–	4	–	7	.364
Cincinnati		–		–	6	–	12	.333
Saint Mary's		–		–	6	–	13	.316
Army		–		–	5	–	11	.313
Lehigh		–		–	5	–	12	.294
Valparaiso		–		–	4	–	12	.250
New Mexico		–		–	5	–	18	.217
Marquette		–		–	2	–	13	.133
San Francisco		–		–	2	–	13	.133
Louisville		–		–	2	–	14	.125
Sewanee		–		–	1	–	14	.067

== Post-season tournaments ==
=== NCAA tournament ===
==== Semifinals & final ====
National Semifinals
Wisconsin	36
Pittsburgh	30
Arkansas	53
Washington State	64

National Final
Wisconsin	39
Washington State	34

=== National Invitation tournament ===
==== Semifinals & finals ====
Semifinals
CCNY	43
Ohio	45
Seton Hall	26
Long Island	49

Finals
Ohio	42
Long Island	56
Third place
CCNY	42
Seton Hall	27

== Awards ==
=== Consensus All-American teams ===
Consensus First Team
Player	Class	Team
John Adams	Senior	Arkansas
Gus Broberg	Senior	Dartmouth
Howard Engleman	Senior	Kansas
Gene Englund	Senior	Wisconsin
George Glamack	Senior	North Carolina

Consensus Second Team
Player	Class	Team
Frank Baumholtz	Senior	Ohio
Bob Kinney	Junior	Rice
Paul Lindemann	Senior	Washington State
Stan Modzelewski	Junior	Rhode Island State
Oscar Schectman	Senior	Long Island

=== Major player of the year awards ===
- Helms Player of the Year: George Glamack, North Carolina (retroactive selection in 1944)

=== Other major awards ===
- NIT/Haggerty Award (Top player in New York City metro area): Jack Garfinkel, St. John's

== Coaching changes ==
A number of teams changed coaches during the season and after it ended.

Team	Former Coach	Interim Coach	New Coach	Reason
Baylor	Ralph Wolf		Bill Henderson	Wolf stayed with the school to become the athletic director.
BYU	Edwin Kimball		Floyd Millet	Kimball continued being BYU's athletic director.
The Citadel	Ben Parker		Ben Clemons	
Colgate	Paul Bixler		Karl J. Lawrence	
Idaho	Forrest Twogood		Guy Wicks	Twogood left to coach San Francisco.
Harvard	Wes Fesler		Earl Brown	
La Salle	Leonard Tanseer		Obie O'Brien	
Lehigh	Paul R. Calvert		Marty Westerman	
New Mexico	Benjamin Sacks		Willis Barnes	
San Francisco	Wally Cameron		Forrest Twogood	
Siena	Henry Bunoski		Dan Cunha	
TCU	Mike Brumbelow		Herb McQuillan	
Texas A&M	Herb McQuillan		Marty Karow	McQuillan left to coach TCU.
Tulsa	Jack Sterrett		Tex Ryon	Sterrett left to coach Wichita Municipal.
USC	Sam Barry		Julie Bescos	
Utah State	Dick Romney		Robert Burnett	
Valparaiso	Jake Christiansen		Loren Ellis	
Vanderbilt	Jim Buford		Norm Cooper	
Wichita Municipal	Bill Hennigh		Jack Sterrett	
