= Ted Strain =

American basketball player

Personal information
- Born: March 1, 1917
- Died: October 4, 1999 (aged 82) Belvidere, Illinois, U.S.
- Listed height: 5 ft 11 in (1.80 m)

Career information
- High school: Harvard (Harvard, Illinois)
- College: Wisconsin (1938–1941)
- Position: Guard

Career history
- 1942–1943: Chicago Bruins

Career highlights
- NCAA champion (1941)

William "Ted" Strain (March 1, 1917 – October 4, 1999) was an American basketball player. He was an early professional player in the National Basketball League (which later merged with the Basketball Association of America to form the NBA) and was a starter on the University of Wisconsin's 1941 national championship team.

Strain, a 5'11" guard from Harvard High School in Harvard, Illinois, played college basketball at Wisconsin for future Hall of Fame coach Bud Foster. Strain played from 1938 to 1941 and, as a senior, was a starting guard for the Badgers' 1941 national championship team.

After the completion of his college career, Strain played one season for the Chicago Bruins of the National Basketball League in 1942–43.

He married Beverly Douglas on October 2, 1947, and owned Strain Market in Harvard, Illinois for 20 years. They had four children.
