= List of Wisconsin Badgers men's basketball seasons =

This is a list of seasons completed by the Wisconsin Badgers men's basketball program since the team's inception in 1898.

== Seasons ==
Statistics overview
Season	Coach	Overall	Conference	Standing	Postseason
James C. Elsom (1898–1904)
1898–99	James Elsom	0–3	—	—	—
1899–1900	James Elsom	1–1	—	—	—
1900–01	James Elsom	1–1	—	—	—
1901–02	James Elsom	7–3	—	—	—
1902–03	James Elsom	5–2	—	—	—
1903–04	James Elsom	11–4	—	—	—
James Elsom:		25–14	—		
Emmett Angell (1904–1908)
1904–05	Emmett Angell	10–8	—	—	—
Emmett Angell (Big Ten) (1905–1908)
1905–06	Emmett Angell	12–2	6–2	2nd	—
1906–07	Emmett Angell	11–3	6–2	T–1st	—
1907–08	Emmett Angell	10–8	7–1	T–1st	—
Emmett Angell:		43–15	19–5		
Haskell Noyes (Big Ten) (1908–1911)
1908–09	Haskell Noyes	8–4	5–4	3rd	—
1909–10	Haskell Noyes	9–5	7–5	3rd	—
1910–11	Haskell Noyes	9–6	6–6	5th	—
Haskell Noyes:		26–15	18–15		
Walter Meanwell (Big Ten) (1911–1917)
1911–12	Walter Meanwell	15–0	12–0	1st	Helms National Champion
1912–13	Walter Meanwell	14–1	11–1	1st	
1913–14	Walter Meanwell	15–0	12–0	1st	Helms National Champion
1914–15	Walter Meanwell	13–4	8–4	3rd	—
1915–16	Walter Meanwell	20–1	11–1	1st	Helms National Champion
1916–17	Walter Meanwell	15–3	9–3	4th	—
Walter Meanwell:		92–9	63–9		
Guy Lowman (Big Ten) (1917–1920)
1917–18	Guy Lowman	14–3	9–3	1st	—
1918–19	Guy Lowman	5–11	3–9	10th	—
1919–20	Guy Lowman	15–5	7–5	5th	—
Guy Lowman:		34–19	19–17		
Walter Meanwell (Big Ten) (1920–1934)
1920–21	Walter Meanwell	13–4	8–4	T–1st	—
1921–22	Walter Meanwell	14–5	8–4	T–2nd	—
1922–23	Walter Meanwell	12–3	11–1	T–1st	—
1923–24	Walter Meanwell	11–5	8–4	T–1st	
1924–25	Walter Meanwell	6–11	3–9	9th	—
1925–26	Walter Meanwell	8–9	4–8	T–8th	—
1926–27	Walter Meanwell	10–7	7–5	T–4th	—
1927–28	Walter Meanwell	13–4	9–3	T–3rd	—
1928–29	Walter Meanwell	15–2	10–2	T–1st	—
1929–30	Walter Meanwell	15–2	8–2	2nd	—
1930–31	Walter Meanwell	8–9	4–8	T–7th	—
1931–32	Walter Meanwell	8–10	3–9	T–8th	—
1932–33	Walter Meanwell	7–13	4–8	8th	—
1933–34	Walter Meanwell	14–6	8–4	T–2nd	—
Walter Meanwell:		154–90	95–71		
Bud Foster (Big Ten) (1934–1959)
1934–35	Bud Foster	15–5	9–3	T–1st	—
1935–36	Bud Foster	11–9	4–8	8th	—
1936–37	Bud Foster	8–12	3–9	T–8th	—
1937–38	Bud Foster	10–10	5–7	7th	—
1938–39	Bud Foster	10–10	4–8	7th	—
1939–40	Bud Foster	5–15	3–9	9th	—
1940–41	Bud Foster	20–3	11–1	1st	NCAA Champion
1941–42	Bud Foster	14–7	10–5	T–2nd	—
1942–43	Bud Foster	12–9	6–6	T–4th	—
1943–44	Bud Foster	12–9	9–3	T–2nd	—
1944–45	Bud Foster	10–11	4–8	T–6th	—
1945–46	Bud Foster	4–17	1–11	9th	—
1946–47	Bud Foster	16–6	9–3	1st	NCAA Elite Eight
1947–48	Bud Foster	12–8	7–5	T–3rd	—
1948–49	Bud Foster	12–10	5–7	7th	—
1949–50	Bud Foster	17–5	9–3	2nd	—
1950–51	Bud Foster	10–12	7–7	T–4th	—
1951–52	Bud Foster	10–12	5–9	7th	—
1952–53	Bud Foster	13–9	10–8	5th	—
1953–54	Bud Foster	12–10	6–8	T–5th	—
1954–55	Bud Foster	10–12	5–9	T–6th	—
1955–56	Bud Foster	6–16	4–10	T–8th	—
1956–57	Bud Foster	5–17	3–11	9th	—
1957–58	Bud Foster	8–14	3–11	10th	—
1958–59	Bud Foster	3–19	1–13	10th	—
Bud Foster:		265–267	143–182		
John Erickson (Big Ten) (1959–1968)
1959–60	John Erickson	8–16	4–10	9th	—
1960–61	John Erickson	7–17	4–10	8th	—
1961–62	John Erickson	17–7	10–4	2nd	—
1962–63	John Erickson	14–10	7–7	6th	—
1963–64	John Erickson	8–16	2–12	10th	—
1964–65	John Erickson	9–13	4–10	8th	—
1965–66	John Erickson	11–13	6–8	7th	—
1966–67	John Erickson	13–11	8–6	4th	—
1967–68	John Erickson	13–11	7–7	5th	—
John Erickson:		100–114	52–74		
John Powless (Big Ten) (1968–1976)
1968–69	John Powless	11–13	5–9	T–8th	—
1969–70	John Powless	10–14	5–9	T–6th	—
1970–71	John Powless	9–15	4–10	T–7th	—
1971–72	John Powless	13–11	6–8	T–5th	—
1972–73	John Powless	11–13	5–9	9th	—
1973–74	John Powless	16–8	8–6	T–4th	—
1974–75	John Powless	8–18	5–13	8th	—
1975–76	John Powless	10–16	4–14	9th	—
John Powless:		88–108	42–78		
Bill Cofield (Big Ten) (1976–1982)
1976–77	Bill Cofield	11–16	7–11	T–7th	—
1977–78	Bill Cofield	8–19	4–14	T–9th	—
1978–79	Bill Cofield	12–15	6–12	T–8th	—
1979–80	Bill Cofield	15–14	7–11	8th	—
1980–81	Bill Cofield	11–16	5–13	9th	—
1981–82	Bill Cofield	6–21	3–15	10th	—
Bill Cofield:		63–101	32–76		
Steve Yoder (Big Ten) (1982–1992)
1982–83	Steve Yoder	8–20	3–15	10th	—
1983–84	Steve Yoder	8–20	4–14	10th	—
1984–85	Steve Yoder	14–14	5–13	9th	—
1985–86	Steve Yoder	12–16	4–14	9th	—
1986–87	Steve Yoder	14–17	4–14	8th	—
1987–88	Steve Yoder	12–16	6–12	7th	—
1988–89	Steve Yoder	18–12	8–10	T–6th	NIT second round
1989–90	Steve Yoder	14–17	4–14	T–8th	—
1990–91	Steve Yoder	15–15	8–10	7th	NIT second round
1991–92	Steve Yoder	13–18	4–14	9th	—
Steve Yoder:		128–165	50–130		
Stu Jackson (Big Ten) (1992–1994)
1992–93	Stu Jackson	14–14	7–11	T–8th	NIT first round
1993–94	Stu Jackson	18–11	8–10	7th	NCAA second round
Stu Jackson:		32–25	15–21		
Stan Van Gundy (Big Ten) (1994–1995)
1994–95	Stan Van Gundy	13–14	7–11	9th	—
Stan Van Gundy:		13–14	7–11		
Dick Bennett (Big Ten) (1995–2001)
1995–96	Dick Bennett	17–15	8–10	8th	NIT second round
1996–97	Dick Bennett	18–10	11–7	T–4th	NCAA Division I first round
1997–98	Dick Bennett	12–19	3–13	T–9th	—
1998–99	Dick Bennett	22–10	9–7	T–3rd	NCAA Division I first round
1999–2000	Dick Bennett	22–14	8–8	6th	NCAA Division I Final Four
2000–01	Dick Bennett; Brad Soderberg	18–11^{[Note A]}	9–7	5th	NCAA Division I first round
Dick Bennett:		93–69	39–45		
Brad Soderberg:		16–10	9–7		
Bo Ryan (Big Ten) (2001–2015)
2001–02	Bo Ryan	19–13	11–5	T–1st	NCAA Division I second round
2002–03	Bo Ryan	24–8	12–4	1st	NCAA Division I Sweet Sixteen
2003–04	Bo Ryan	25–7	12–4	T–2nd	NCAA Division I second round
2004–05	Bo Ryan	25–9	11–5	3rd	NCAA Division I Elite Eight
2005–06	Bo Ryan	19–12	9–7	T–4th	NCAA Division I first round
2006–07	Bo Ryan	30–6	13–3	2nd	NCAA Division I second round
2007–08	Bo Ryan	31–5	16–2	1st	NCAA Division I Sweet Sixteen
2008–09	Bo Ryan	20–13	10–8	T–4th	NCAA Division I second round
2009–10	Bo Ryan	24–9	13–5	4th	NCAA Division I second round
2010–11	Bo Ryan	25–9	13–5	3rd	NCAA Division I Sweet Sixteen
2011–12	Bo Ryan	26–10	12–6	4th	NCAA Division I Sweet Sixteen
2012–13	Bo Ryan	23–12	12–6	T–4th	NCAA Division I first round
2013–14	Bo Ryan	30–8	12–6	T–2nd	NCAA Division I Final Four
2014–15	Bo Ryan	36–4	16–2	1st	NCAA Division I Runner-up
2015–16	Bo Ryan; Greg Gard	22–13^{[Note B]}	12–6	T–3rd	NCAA Division I Sweet Sixteen
Bo Ryan:		364–130 (.737)	172–68 (.717)		
Greg Gard (Big Ten) (2016–present)
2016–17	Greg Gard	27–10	12–6	T–2nd	NCAA Division I Sweet Sixteen
2017–18	Greg Gard	15–18	7–11	9th	
2018–19	Greg Gard	23–11	14–6	4th	NCAA Division I first round
2019–20	Greg Gard	21–10	14–6	T–1st	No postseason held
2020–21	Greg Gard	18–13	10–10	T–6th	NCAA Division I second round
2021–22	Greg Gard	25–8	15–5	T–1st	NCAA Division I second round
2022–23	Greg Gard	20–15	9–11	T–11th	NIT Semifinals
2023–24	Greg Gard	22–14	11–9	5th	NCAA Division I first round
2024–25	Greg Gard	27–10	13–7	T–4th	NCAA Division I second round
2025–26	Greg Gard	24–11	14–6	5th	NCAA Division I first round
Greg Gard:		237–128 (.649)	131–83 (.612)		
Total:		1774–1291 (.579)			
National champion Postseason invitational champion Conference regular season champion Conference regular season and conference tournament champion Division regular season champion Division regular season and conference tournament champion Conference tournament champion

^A. Soderberg coached the last 26 games of the 2000-01 season, going 16–10. Bennett, who started the season as head coach before retiring, went 2–1.
^B. Gard coached the last 23 games of the 2015-16 season, going 15–8. Ryan, who started the season as head coach before retiring, went 7–5.
