= 1941 NCAA basketball championship game =

1941 NCAA Tournament Championship Game
National championship game
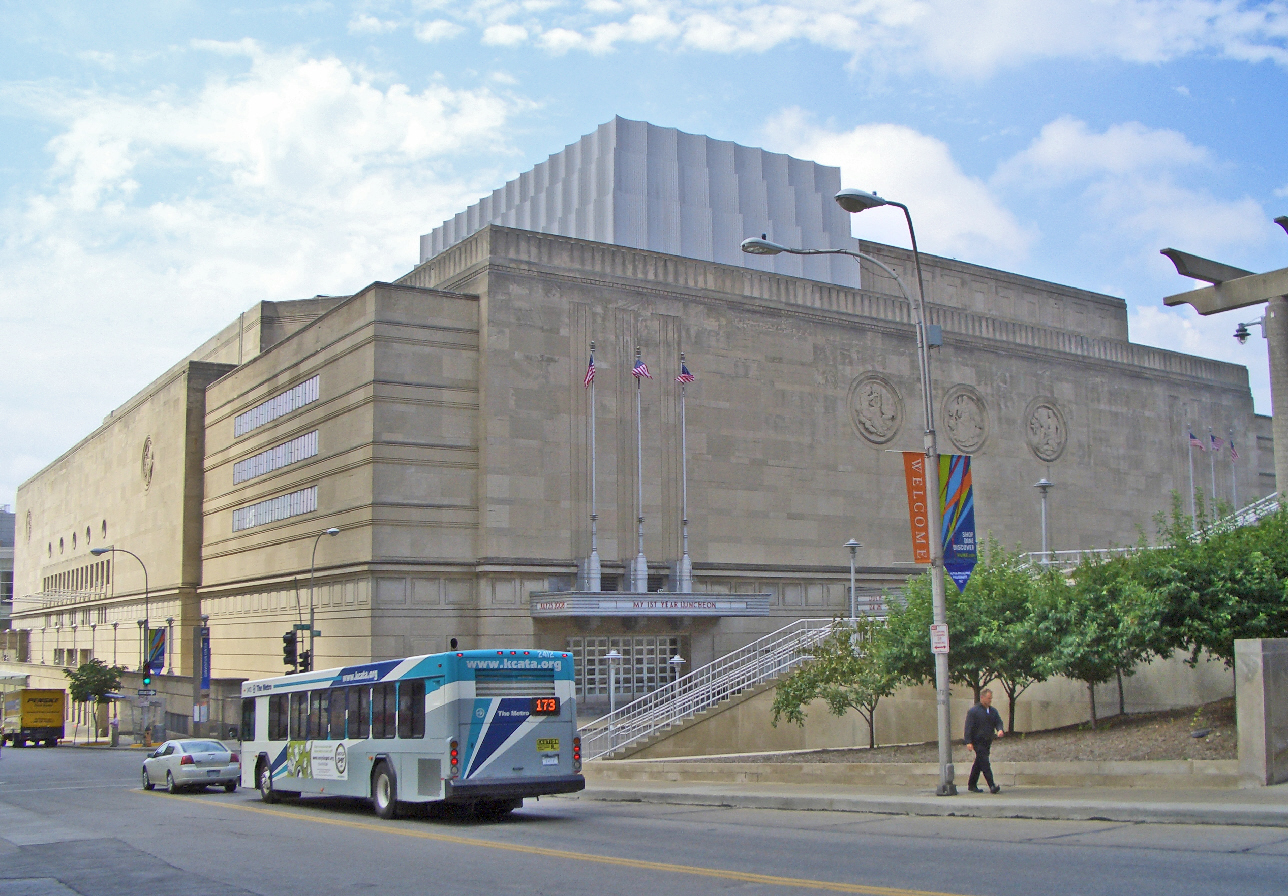
- The Municipal Auditorium in Kansas City, Missouri, hosted the championship game.
Wisconsin Badgers	Washington State Cougars
Big Ten	PCC
(19-3)	(26-5)
39	34
Head coach: Harold E. Foster	Head coach: Jack Friel
	1st half	2nd half	Total
Wisconsin Badgers	21	18	39
Washington State Cougars	17	17	34
- Date: March 29, 1941
- Venue: Municipal Auditorium, Kansas City, Missouri
- MVP: John Kotz, Wisconsin

The 1941 NCAA University Division Basketball Championship Game was the finals of the 1941 NCAA basketball tournament and it determined the national champion for the 1940-41 NCAA men's basketball season. The game was played on March 29, 1941, at Municipal Auditorium in Kansas City, Missouri. It featured the Wisconsin Badgers of the Big Ten Conference, and the Washington State Cougars of the Pacific Coast Conference.

== Participating teams ==
=== Wisconsin Badgers ===
- East
  - Wisconsin 51, Dartmouth 50
- Final Four
  - Wisconsin 36, Pittsburgh 30

=== Washington State Cougars ===
- West
  - Washington State 48, Creighton 39
- Final Four
  - Washington State 64, Arkansas 53

== Game summary ==
March 29, 1941

Wisconsin Badgers 39, Washington State Cougars 34
Scoring by half: 21-17, 18-17
Pts: Gene Englund 13	Pts: Kirk Gebert 21

Municipal Auditorium, Kansas City, Missouri

== Aftermath ==
1941 represented a high point for both teams - This remains Wisconsin's only national championship, and this was their last appearance in the National Championship game until 2015, where they lost to the Duke Blue Devils by a score of 68–63. To date, this remains Washington State's sole appearance in the national championship game, and the Cougars would only make 5 more tournament appearances since.
