= 1940–41 Pittsburgh Panthers men's basketball team =

American college basketball season

1940–41 Pittsburgh Panthers men's basketball

NCAA tournament, Final Four
- Conference: Independent
- Record: 13–6
- Head coach: Doc Carlson (19th season)
- Home arena: Pitt Pavilion

The 1940–41 Pittsburgh Panthers men's basketball team represented the University of Pittsburgh during the 1940–41 NCAA men's basketball season. Led by head coach Doc Carlson, in his 19th season, the Panthers finished with a record of 13–6. They participated in the 1941 NCAA basketball tournament where they reached the only Final Four in program history before losing to eventual champion Wisconsin in the national semifinals.

== Roster ==
1940–41 Pitt Panthers men's basketball team
Players
Coaches

Pos.	#	Name	Height	Weight	Year	Hometown
	17	Sam Milanovich	—	—	Sr
		Mel Port (C)	—	—	Sr
	15	Eddie Straloski (C)	—	—	Sr
		George Kocheran	—	—	Sr
		Jimmy Klein	—	—	Sr

Head coach

- Doc Carlson

Assistant coach(es)

Legend

- (C) Team captain
- (S) Suspended
- (I) Ineligible
- (W) Walk-on
- Injured
- Current redshirt

== Schedule and results ==
Date time, TV	Rank^{#}	Opponent^{#}	Result	Record	Site city, state
Regular season
Dec 18, 1940*		at Wisconsin	W 36–34	1–0	Wisconsin Field House; Madison, Wisconsin
Dec 20, 1940*		at Illinois	W 43–41	2–0	Huff Hall (4,926); Champaign, Illinois
Dec 21, 1940*		at Northwestern	L 28–48	2–1	Patten Gymnasium; Evanston, Illinois
Dec 23, 1940*		at Butler	W 41–40	3–1	Hinkle Fieldhouse; Indianapolis, Indiana
Dec 28, 1940*		vs. Michigan	L 40–46	3–2	Fairgrounds Coliseum; Columbus, Ohio
Dec 30, 1940*		vs. Ohio State	W 48–34	4–2	Fairgrounds Coliseum; Columbus, Ohio
Jan 7, 1941*		Westminster	L 36–41	4–3	Pitt Pavilion; Pittsburgh, Pennsylvania
Jan 11, 1941*		Penn State	W 36–27	5–3	Pitt Pavilion; Pittsburgh, Pennsylvania
Jan 15, 1941*		Carnegie Tech	W 45–30	6–3	Pitt Pavilion; Pittsburgh, Pennsylvania
Jan 22, 1941*		Waynesburg	L 40–44	6–4	Pitt Pavilion; Pittsburgh, Pennsylvania
Feb 3, 1941*		at Duke	W 46–32	7–4	Duke Indoor Stadium; Durham, North Carolina
Feb 8, 1941*		Army	W 39–32	8–4	Pitt Pavilion; Pittsburgh, Pennsylvania
Feb 11, 1941*		West Virginia	W 56–45	9–4	Pitt Pavilion; Pittsburgh, Pennsylvania
Feb 13, 1941*		at Geneva	W 50–26	10–4	Beaver Falls, Pennsylvania
Feb 18, 1941*		Carnegie Tech	W 38–29	11–4	Pitt Pavilion; Pittsburgh, Pennsylvania
Feb 21, 1941*		Geneva	W 55–41	12–4	Pitt Pavilion; Pittsburgh, Pennsylvania
Mar 1, 1941*		at Penn State	L 21–36	12–5	Rec Hall; University Park, Pennsylvania
NCAA tournament
Mar 21, 1941*		vs. North Carolina; East Regional Final – Elite Eight	W 26–20	13–5	Wisconsin Field House; Madison, Wisconsin
Mar 22, 1941*		at Wisconsin; National Semifinals – Final Four	L 30–36	13–6	Wisconsin Field House; Madison, Wisconsin
*Non-conference game. ^{#}Rankings from AP Poll. (#) Tournament seedings in parentheses.
