= Wisconsin Badgers men's basketball =

Men's basketball team of the University of Wisconsin

2026–27 Wisconsin Badgers men's basketball team
- University: University of Wisconsin–Madison
- First season: 1898–99; 128 years ago
- Athletic director: Shawn Eichorst
- Head coach: Greg Gard; 12th season, 236–126 (.652)
- Location: Madison, Wisconsin
- Arena: Kohl Center (capacity: 17,287)
- NCAA division: Division I
- Conference: Big Ten
- Nickname: Badgers
- Colors: Cardinal and white
- Student section: AreaRED
- All-time record: 1,770–1,293 (.578)
- NCAA tournament record: 41–27 (.603)

NCAA Division I tournament champions
- 1941
Other NCAA Division I tournament results
Runner-up	2015
Final Four	1941, 2000, 2014, 2015
Elite Eight	1941, 1947, 2000, 2005, 2014, 2015
Sweet Sixteen	2000, 2003, 2005, 2008, 2011, 2012, 2014, 2015, 2016, 2017
Appearances	1941, 1947, 1994, 1997, 1999, 2000, 2001, 2002, 2003, 2004, 2005, 2006, 2007, 2008, 2009, 2010, 2011, 2012, 2013, 2014, 2015, 2016, 2017, 2019, 2021, 2022, 2024, 2025, 2026

Pre-tournament Helms national champions
- 1911–12, 1913–14, 1915–16

Conference tournament champions
- Big Ten: 2004, 2008, 2015

Conference regular-season champions
- Big Ten: 1907, 1908, 1912, 1913, 1914, 1916, 1918, 1921, 1923, 1924, 1929, 1935, 1941, 1947, 2002, 2003, 2008, 2015, 2020, 2022

Uniforms
Home	Away

The Wisconsin Badgers are an NCAA Division I college basketball team competing in the Big Ten Conference. The Badgers' home games are played at the Kohl Center, located on the University of Wisconsin–Madison campus in Madison, Wisconsin. Wisconsin has 1,732 wins through the end of the 2024–25 season which is top 50 all-time among Division I college basketball programs. Wisconsin has appeared in the NCAA tournament 29 times. The Wisconsin Badgers currently have 51 players in their 1,000-point club as well.

== History ==
=== Early years (1898–1911) ===
Wisconsin Badger basketball began in December, 1898 with the formation of its first team coached by Dr. James C. Elsom. The Badgers played their first game on January 21, 1899, losing to the Milwaukee Normal Alumni 25–15 in Milwaukee, Wisconsin . In 1905, Christian Steinmetz became the first Wisconsin Badger basketball player to be named All-American. In the 1906–07 season, Wisconsin won its first share of the Big Ten Championship, under the coaching of Emmett Dunn Angell. They won it again the next year in 1908.

=== Walter Meanwell era (1911–1934) ===
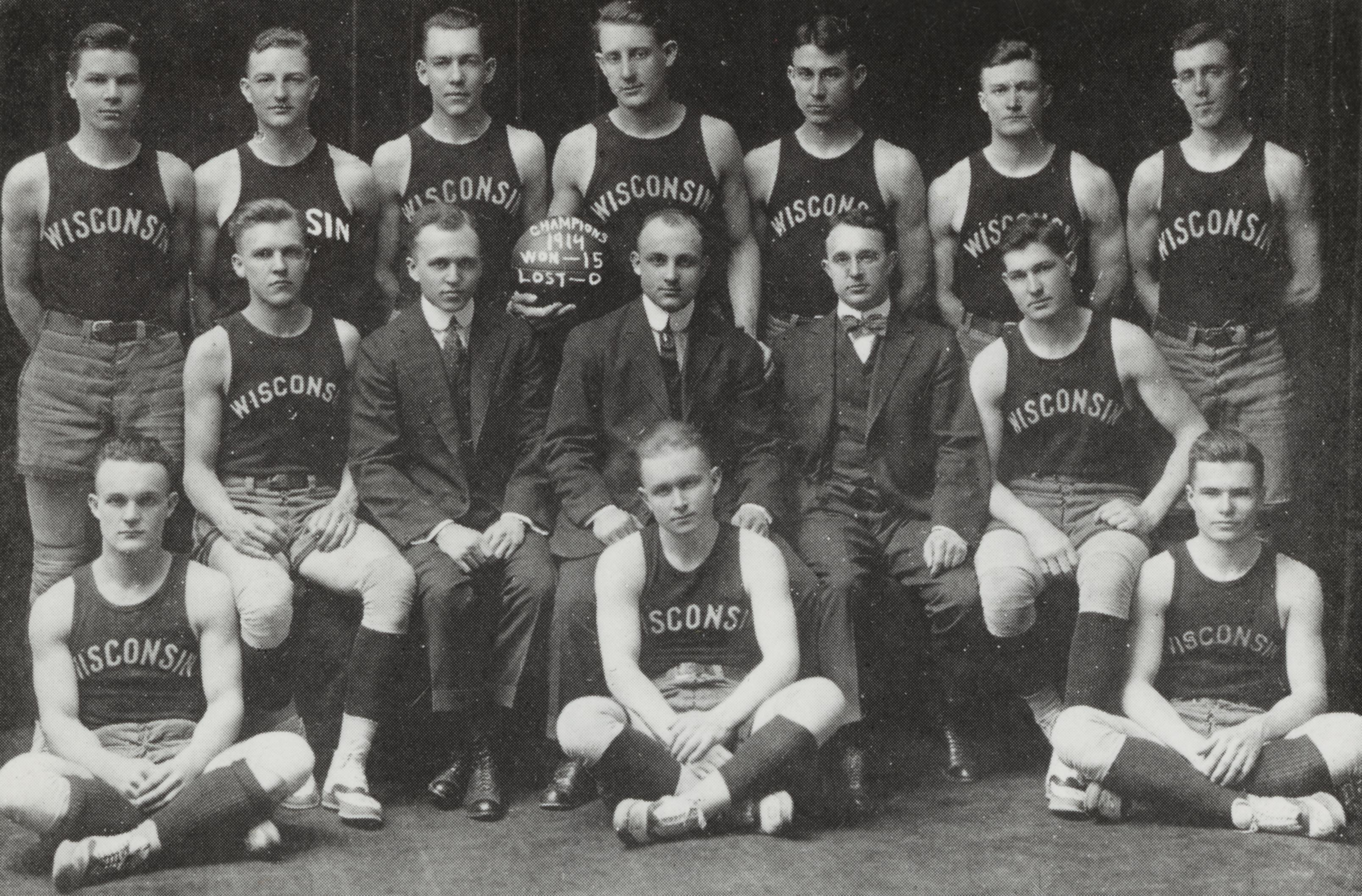
The 1913–14 basketball team.

Walter Meanwell began coaching the Badgers in 1911. In his first season, he led Wisconsin to an undefeated season (15–0), and then led them to another 15–0 season in 1913–14. Meanwell's teams would win eight Big Ten Championships during his tenure, in 1912, 1913, 1914, 1916, 1921, 1923, 1924, and 1929. Between the 1917–18 and 1919–20 seasons, Guy Lowman coached the Badgers, leading them to a 1918 Big Ten Conference Championship before Meanwell returned in 1920. Meanwell would also coach two All-Americans during his Wisconsin career, George Levis in 1916 and Harold "Bud" Foster in 1930. On December 18, 1930, the first game was played in the new Wisconsin Field House, a basketball arena with a capacity of 11,500.

=== Bud Foster era (1934–1959) ===
Starting with the 1934–35 season, former UW basketball player Bud Foster began coaching the Wisconsin Badgers. In his first season as head coach, he led the Badgers to their 12th Big Ten Conference Championship in 28 years. In 1941, Foster led the Badgers to their only national championship in history. With the help of tournament MOP John Kotz and All-American Gene Englund, the Badgers beat Washington State 39–34 in the final game of the NCAA Tournament. It was their first ever invitation to the NCAA Tournament, after winning the Big Ten Championship in that year. Foster coached three All-Americans during his tenure – Gene Englund in 1941, John Kotz in 1942 and Don Rehfeldt in 1950. The Badgers won one more Big Ten championship in 1947 and attended their second NCAA Tournament. It would be their last postseason appearance of any sort for 42 years, and their last NCAA appearance for 47 years.

=== 1959–1994 ===
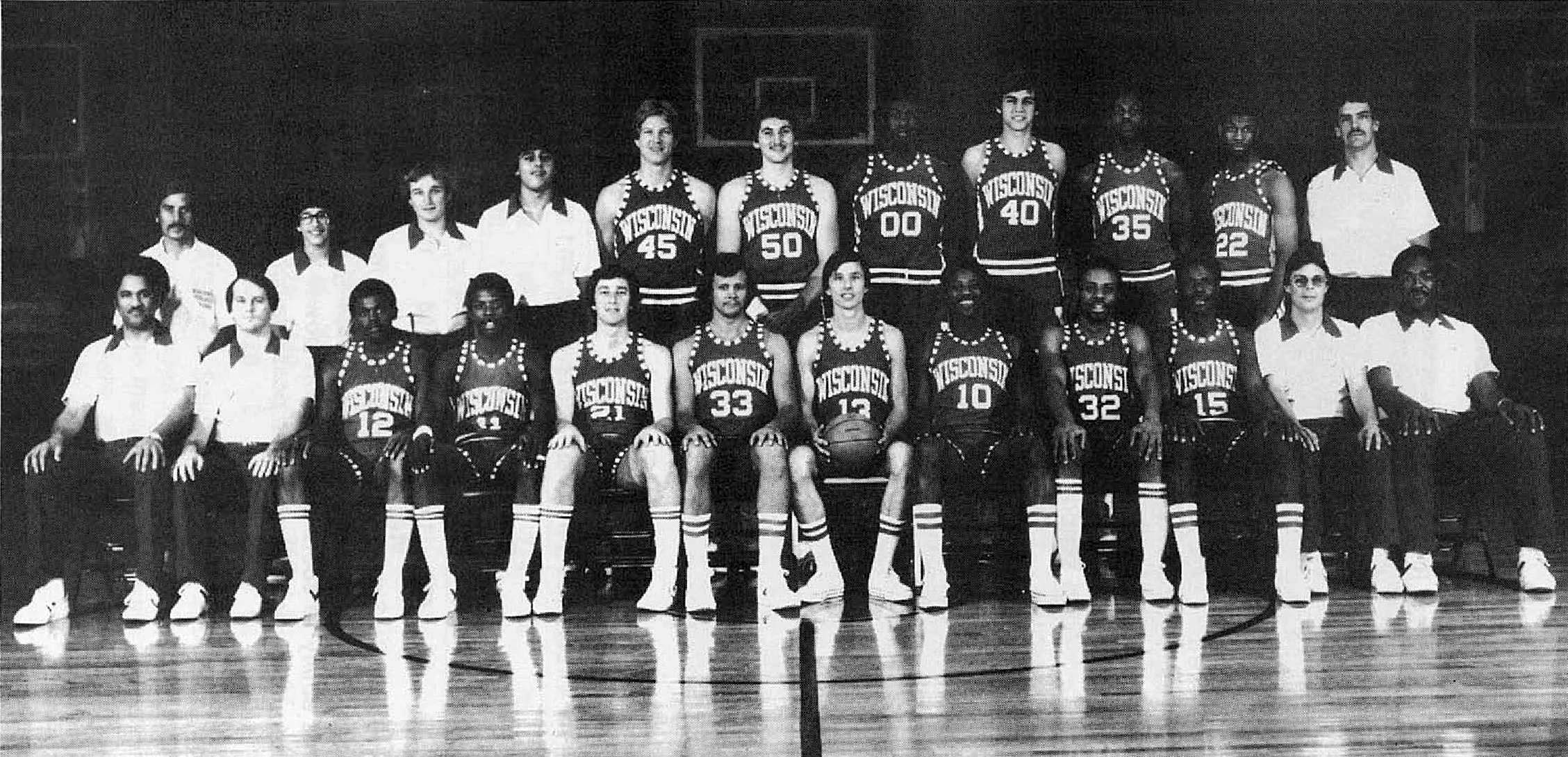
The 1977 basketball team

The mediocre records of the last decade of Foster's tenure would remain largely the norm for the Badgers for the next four decades. From 1954 to 1995, the Badgers would have only eight winning seasons. They also notched only two winning records in Big Ten play and finished as high as fourth only four times. Among the few bright spots during this time were the 1962 win over number one ranked Ohio State and stars Jerry Lucas and John Havlicek, NIT appearances under Steve Yoder in 1989 and 1991, and another in 1992 under Stu Jackson. The revival of Wisconsin basketball began in the early 1990s, when Yoder and Jackson recruited and developed Michael Finley, Tracy Webster, Rashard Griffith and other talented players. In 1994, the Badgers returned to the NCAA tournament for the first time since 1947 and notched their first win in that tournament since winning it all in 1941.

=== Dick Bennett era (1995–2000) ===
In 1995, Dick Bennett then took over after leading Wisconsin-Green Bay to mid-major prominence. In 1997, he led the Badgers to their first winning Big Ten record in 23 years, and only their second in 43 years. The Badgers began a run of consecutive NCAA tournament appearances in 1999, and reached the NCAA tournament Final Four in 2000.

In 2000, the Badgers entered the NCAA tournament seeded #8 in the West bracket. Beyond most expectations, they defeated #9 Fresno St, #1 Arizona, #4 LSU, and #6 Purdue in order to advance to the Final Four. However, the Badgers then lost to #1 and eventual national champion Michigan State, 53–41.

After three games into the 2000–01 season (in which he went 2–1), Bennett abruptly retired due to burnout. His final game was a 78–75 win over eventual Final Four participant Maryland. Assistant Brad Soderberg was named interim head coach. Soderberg led Wisconsin to a 16–10 record (18–11 overall), but was upset in the first round of the NCAA tournament by Georgia State.

=== Bo Ryan era (2001–2015) ===
Soderberg was let go at the end of the 2000–01 season, and Wisconsin hired University of Wisconsin–Milwaukee coach Bo Ryan as the new head coach. Ryan had previously won four Division III national championships at the University of Wisconsin-Platteville.

Coach Bo Ryan brought the program continued success, achieving greater regular season and NCAA tournament success in his 15-year tenure than the program had achieved over the prior 60 years. Since the late 1990s Wisconsin has turned into a basketball powerhouse making regular trips to the NCAA Tournament. Since 2001-2002 Wisconsin has finished in the top 4 in the Big Ten regular season standings 19 times in the past 21 seasons, and have won 6 Big Ten regular season championships and 3 Big Ten tournament championships.

In the 2001–02 season, under the new leadership of Bo Ryan, the Badgers went 19–13 (11–5) and won a share of the Big Ten regular season title for the first time since 1947, tying for first place in the Big Ten with Indiana, Illinois, and Ohio State. The Badgers defeated St. John's 90–80 in Ryan's first NCAA tournament game before falling to eventual national champion Maryland.

During the 2002–03 season, Wisconsin secured its first outright regular season conference title in 56 years. The Badgers lost in the quarterfinals of the Big Ten tournament to Ohio State. They then attended the NCAA tournament with a #5 seed, beating Weber State in the first round and Tulsa in the second round. The Badgers then lost to Kentucky in the Sweet Sixteen.

In the 2003–04 season, Wisconsin finished second in the Big Ten behind Illinois. They went on to win the Big Ten tournament for the first time since its inception in 1998. The Badgers defeated Minnesota in a quarterfinal, rallied to beat Michigan State in a semifinal, and defeated Illinois in the final. However, because the game was played too late to be taken under consideration by the NCAA tournament selection committee, the Badgers received a #6 seed. They defeated Richmond in the first round before losing to #3 seed Pittsburgh in the second round.

In the 2004–05 season, Wisconsin finished third in the Big Ten. In the Big Ten tournament semifinal against Iowa, Alando Tucker made a long shot at the buzzer to give UW a 3-point win, but the Badgers lost to #1 ranked Illinois in the championship. In the 2005 NCAA tournament, Wisconsin advanced to the Elite Eight by defeating #11 seed Northern Iowa, #14 seed Bucknell, and #10 seed North Carolina State before losing to #1 and eventual national champion, North Carolina.

In the 2005–06 season, the Badgers had a somewhat disappointing season that culminated in a loss to Indiana in the Big Ten tournament quarterfinals, and another loss to Arizona in the first round of the NCAA tournament. The highlight of the season was a win over intrastate rival Marquette.

The Badgers' lone non-conference loss was against Missouri State. On February 19, 2007, the Badgers earned their first #1 ranking in school history with a 26–2 record, but the next day, were defeated by the unranked Michigan State Spartans 64–55 at the Breslin Center. Entering the Big Ten tournament as the #2 seed, they defeated Michigan State 70–57. The Badgers defeated the Fighting Illini in the semi-finals, 53–41, to advance to the finals against Ohio State, where they were beaten 66–49.

The Badgers were selected as a 2nd seed in the NCAA tournament, but were defeated by 7th-seeded UNLV in the second round.

In the 2007–08 season, the Badgers finished first in the Big Ten, winning the Big Ten regular season outright and the conference tournament, defeating the Illinois Fighting Illini in the finals. In the NCAA tournament, the Badgers were awarded a No. 3 seed and won their first game against California State University, Fullerton. They followed that up with a win in the second round over Michael Beasley and the Kansas State Wildcats, due in part to 25 points from sophomore Trevon Hughes. The Badgers then lost to the No. 10 seed Davidson Wildcats and Stephen Curry by a score of 73–56 in the Sweet Sixteen.

In the 2008–09 season, the Badgers finished tied for 4th in the Big Ten with an overall record of 19–11 and 10–8 in the Big Ten. In the NCAA tournament, the Badgers were awarded a No. 12 seed and upset No. 5 seed Florida State University in the first round, 61–59. In the second round the Badgers lost 60–49 to the No. 4 seed Xavier University. The Badgers finished the 2008–09 season with an overall record of 20–13.

In the 2009–10 season, Wisconsin defeated three top 5-ranked teams during the regular season: Duke, Purdue, and Michigan State. The Badgers finished the season tied for 4th in the Big Ten, with a record of 23–7 overall and 13–5 in the Big Ten. In the NCAA tournament, the Badgers were awarded a #4 seed. They beat #13 seed Wofford in the first round, 53–49. In the second round the Badgers lost 87–69 to the #12 seed Cornell University. The Badgers finished the 2009–10 season with an overall record of 24–9.

Ryan led the Badgers to the school's third undefeated season at home in 2010–11. The Badgers finished 25–9 overall (13–5 Big Ten). In February 2011, they beat then-undefeated Ohio State University, the school's second win over the AP No. 1 team. After falling to Penn State in the first round of the Big Ten tournament, the Badgers secured a No. 4-seed in the NCAA Tournament. The team beat 13th-seed Belmont and fifth-seed Kansas State. They fell to Butler in the Sweet Sixteen. Jordan Taylor was named a second-team All-American, and Jon Leuer was honorable mention. Leuer was selected in the second round of the NBA draft by the Milwaukee Bucks.

The Badgers finished the 2011–12 season 26–10 overall (12–6 Big Ten). In the Big Ten tournament, Wisconsin was the #4 seed and defeated the #5 seed Hoosiers before losing to the #1 seed Spartans. In the NCAA Tournament, the Badgers were awarded the 4th-seed in the East Region. The team defeated 13th-seeded Montana and 5th-seeded Vanderbilt. In the regional semifinal, Wisconsin faced the #1 seeded Syracuse, losing 64–63.

The 2012–13 Badgers lost junior starting point guard Josh Gasser, who tore his ACL in October. Wisconsin defeated Michigan and Indiana in the Big Ten tournament before losing to Ohio State in the championship. The Badgers earned a #5 seed in the NCAA Tournament and faced #12 seed Ole Miss, where they were upset 57–46. The Badgers finished with a 23–12 record, including a 12–6 mark in Big Ten play.

In the 2013–14 season, the Badgers tallied 16 wins before their first loss of the season at the hands of Indiana. They lost four of their next five games. The team finished the Big Ten schedule with one loss to Nebraska in the regular season finale, earning the #2 seed in the Big Ten tournament. They lost in the semi-finals to the Michigan State Spartans. The Badgers were awarded a #2 seed in the NCAA tournament. They beat #15 seed American, then Oregon, Baylor, and the #1 seed Arizona Wildcats. This led to the third Final Four appearance for the Badgers in school history. The Badgers lost the Final Four match-up with Kentucky, when Aaron Harrison hit a last second three pointer.

In the 2014–2015 season the Badgers won the Big Ten title outright and the Big Ten tournament title. They received their first #1 seed in the NCAA tournament, entering the tournament ranked #3 in the nation. The Badgers locked up their second consecutive Final Four appearance with an 85–78 victory over #2 seed Arizona, after having defeated #4 seed North Carolina 79–72. In the Final Four, they topped previously unbeaten overall #1 seed Kentucky 71–64, ending their undefeated season. They lost to Duke in the championship game, 68–63.

Midway through the 2015–16 season, Ryan opted to retire immediately after earlier saying that this season would be his last.

=== Greg Gard era (2015–present) ===
Greg Gard, who had been on Ryan's staff since his days at UW-Platteville, was named interim head coach in December 2015.

In the 2015–16 season, the Badgers entered the NCAA tournament as a 7 seed. The Badgers beat 10 seed Pittsburgh in the first round 47–43 to advance to face 2 seed Xavier in the second round. The Badgers locked up their second victory defeating Xavier 66–63 with a buzzer beater from Bronson Koenig. They were then defeated in the sweet sixteen by 6 seed Notre Dame, 61–56. Earlier, Wisconsin had dropped the interim tag from Gard's title and named him head coach.

In the 2016–17 season, the Badgers were second in the regular-season Big Ten standings and in the Big Ten Conference tournament. They entered the NCAA tournament as an 8 seed. They defeated 9 seed Virginia Tech in the first round 84–74, moving on to face overall 1 seed Villanova at Buffalo. They defeated Villanova 65–62 to advance to the Sweet Sixteen for the fourth straight year, only to lose 84–83 to 4 seed Florida on a last-second buzzer beater in overtime by Chris Chiozza.

In the 2017–18 season, the Badgers finished the season with a 15–18 record, 7–11 in Big Ten Play and finished in 9th place. They defeated Maryland in the second round of the Big Ten tournament, followed by a loss to Michigan State in the quarterfinals. The Badgers failed to make the NCAA tournament for the first time since 1998, ending their streak of 19 years.

In the 2018–19 season, the Badgers finished the season with a 23–11 record, 14–6 in Big Ten play, and finished in 4th place. Wisconsin entered the Big Ten tournament as the 4 seed, after they earned a double bye, and beat Nebraska before they were defeated by Michigan State in the semifinals. The Badgers earned a bid into the NCAA tournament as a 5 seed and lost to Oregon in the first round.

The Badgers would complete the 2019–20 season with a 21–10 record, with a 14–6 Big Ten record. After winning 8 straight games to end the regular season, Wisconsin secured a share of the Big Ten regular season title, and was named the #1 seed in the Big Ten tournament. Coach Gard would also be named the Big Ten Coach of the Year. However, the Badgers' season would end early as the Big Ten tournament and NCAA Tournament were both cancelled due to precautions related to the COVID-19 pandemic. Wisconsin would be listed at #17 on the AP's final 2019–20 rankings.

In the 2020–21 season the Wisconsin Badgers finished the season with a 18–13 record, finished 10–10 in B1G Ten play, and finished in 6th place. They enter the Big Ten tournament as the 6th seed and faced Penn State. The held on 75–74 and advance to the quarterfinals to face Iowa. They lost 62–57. They entered the NCAA tournament as a 9 seed. They defeated North Carolina in the first round 85–62. They lost 76–63 in the second round against Baylor who became the 2021 tournament champions.

In the 2021–22 season, the Wisconsin Badgers finished the season with a 25–8 record, 15-5 in BIG Ten play. As the No. 2 seed in the Big Ten tournament, they lost to Michigan State in the quarterfinals. They received an at-large bid to the NCAA tournament as the No. 3 seed in the Midwest region. They defeated Colgate in the First Round 67–60 before being upset by No. 11 seed Iowa State in the Second Round 54–49.

In the 2022–23 season, the Badgers started the season out 11–2 but struggled after that by finishing 17–14 and 9–11 in Big Ten play. They failed to qualify for the NCAA tournament for the first time since the 2017–18 season but accepted an invitation to the NIT Tournament.

In the 2023–24 season, the Badgers finished the year 22–14, with 11–9 in conference play. In the early season, the Badgers upset Marquette, who at the time was the No. 3 team in the nation. In the Big Ten Tournament, the Badgers displayed some fight, eliminating No. 12, Maryland, No. 4 Northwestern, and No. 1 Purdue who was also ranked No. 1 in the nation. Ultimately the Badgers fell short, losing the conference title to Illinois. Wisconsin was given a 5 seed in the NCAA Tournament, where they were upset in the first round by JMU.

In the 2024–25 season, the Badgers were 26–9, and 13–7 in conference play. The Badgers had a strong start, upsetting No. 21 Arizona. They made it to the Big Ten Championship game, upsetting the Conference No. 1 Michigan State in the semi-finals. Ultimately, they lost to Michigan. The Badgers secured a 3 seed in the NCAA Tournament, beating 14 seed Montana 85–66 before losing to BYU in the second round 91–89.

== Coaching history ==
Coach	Years	Record	Conference record	Conference titles	Conference tournament titles	NCAA Championships	Overall win percentage
James C. Elsom	1898–1904	25–14	–				64%
Emmett Angell	1904–1908	43–15	19–5	2			74%
Haskell Noyes	1908–1911	26–15	18–15				63%
Walter Meanwell	1911–1917	92–9	63–9	4			91%
Guy Lowman	1917–1920	34–19	19–17	1			64%
Walter Meanwell	1920–1934	154–90	95–71	4			63%
Bud Foster	1934–1959	265–267	143–182	3		1	50%
John E. Erickson	1959–1968	100–114	52–74				47%
John Powless	1968–1976	88–108	42–78				45%
Bill Cofield	1976–1982	63–101	32–76				38%
Steve Yoder	1982–1992	128–165	50–130				44%
Stu Jackson	1992–1994	32–25	15–21				56%
Stan Van Gundy	1994–1995	13–14	7–11				48%
Dick Bennett	1995–2000	93–69	39–45				57%
Brad Soderberg	2000–2001	16–10	9–7				62%
Bo Ryan	2001–2015	364–130	172–68	4	3		74%
Greg Gard	2015–present	177–95	98–61	2			65%
Total	1898–present	1678–1253	854–862	20	3	1	57%

== Postseason ==
=== NCAA tournament results ===
The Badgers have appeared in the NCAA tournament 29 times, including a streak of 19 consecutive appearances. Their combined record is 41–28. They were the national champion in 1941.

Year	Seed	Round	Opponent	Result
1941		Elite Eight; Final Four; National Championship	Dartmouth; Pittsburgh; Washington State	W 51–50; W 36–30; W 39–34
1947		Elite Eight; Regional 3rd Place Game	CCNY; Navy	L 56–70; W 50–49
1994	#9	First round Second round	#8 Cincinnati #1 Missouri	W 80–72; L 96–109
1997	#7	First round	#10 Texas	L 58–71
1999	#5	First round	#12 SW Missouri State	L 32–43
2000	#8	First round Second round Sweet Sixteen; Elite Eight; Final Four	#9 Fresno State #1 Arizona #4 LSU #6 Purdue #1 Michigan State	W 66–56; W 66–59; W 61–48; W 64–60; L 41–53
2001	#6	First round	#11 Georgia State	L 49–50
2002	#8	First round Second round	#9 St. John's #1 Maryland	W 80–70; L 57–87
2003	#5	First round Second round Sweet Sixteen	#12 Weber State #13 Tulsa #1 Kentucky	W 81–74; W 61–60; L 57–63
2004	#6	First round Second round	#11 Richmond #3 Pittsburgh	W 76–64; L 55–59
2005	#6	First round Second round Sweet Sixteen; Elite Eight	#11 Northern Iowa #14 Bucknell #10 NC State #1 North Carolina	W 57–52; W 71–62; W 65–56; L 82–88
2006	#9	First round	#8 Arizona	L 75–94
2007	#2	First round Second round	#15 Texas A&M Corpus–Christi #7 UNLV	W 76–63; L 68–74
2008	#3	First round Second round Sweet Sixteen	#14 Cal State Fullerton #11 Kansas State #10 Davidson	W 71–56; W 72–55; L 56–73
2009	#12	First round Second round	#5 Florida State #4 Xavier	W 61–59 OT; L 49–60
2010	#4	First round Second round	#13 Wofford #12 Cornell	W 53–49; L 69–87
2011	#4	Second round Third round Sweet Sixteen	#13 Belmont #5 Kansas State #8 Butler	W 72–58; W 70–65; L 54–61
2012	#4	Second round Third round Sweet Sixteen	#13 Montana #5 Vanderbilt #1 Syracuse	W 73–49; W 60–57; L 63–64
2013	#5	Second round	#12 Ole Miss	L 46–57
2014	#2	Second round Third round Sweet Sixteen; Elite Eight; Final Four	#15 American #7 Oregon #6 Baylor #1 Arizona #8 Kentucky	W 75–35; W 85–77; W 69–52; W 64–63 OT; L 73–74
2015	#1	Second round Third round Sweet Sixteen; Elite Eight; Final Four; National Championship	#16 Coastal Carolina #8 Oregon #4 North Carolina #2 Arizona #1 Kentucky #1 Duke	W 86–72; W 72–65; W 79–72; W 85–78; W 71–64; L 63–68
2016	#7	First round Second round Sweet Sixteen	#10 Pittsburgh #2 Xavier #6 Notre Dame	W 47–43; W 66–63; L 56–61
2017	#8	First round Second round Sweet Sixteen	#9 Virginia Tech #1 Villanova #4 Florida	W 84–74; W 65–62; L 83–84 OT
2019	#5	First round	#12 Oregon	L 54–72
2021	#9	First round Second round	#8 North Carolina #1 Baylor	W 85–62; L 63–76
2022	#3	First round Second round	#14 Colgate #11 Iowa State	W 67–60; L 49–54
2024	#5	First round	#12 James Madison	L 61–72
2025	#3	First round Second round	#14 Montana #6 BYU	W 85–66; L 89–91
2026	#5	First round	#12 High Point	L 82–83

NCAA Tournament seeding history

The NCAA began seeding the tournament with the 1979 edition.

Years →	'94	'97	'99	'00	'01	'02	'03	'04	'05	'06	'07	'08	'09	'10	'11	'12	'13	'14	'15	'16	'17	'19	'21	'22	'24	'25	'26
Seeds →	9	7	5	8	6	8	5	6	6	9	2	3	12	4	4	4	5	2	1	7	8	5	9	3	5	3	5

=== NIT results ===
The Badgers have appeared in the National Invitation Tournament (NIT) five times. Their combined record is 6–5.

Year	Round	Opponent	Result
1989	First round Second round	New Orleans; Saint Louis	W 63–61; L 68–73
1991	First round Second round	Bowling Green; Stanford	W 87–79; L 72–80
1993	First round	Rice	L 73–77
1996	First round Second round	Manhattan; Illinois State	W 55–42; L 62–77
2023	First round Second round Quarterfinals; Semifinals	Bradley; Liberty; Oregon; North Texas	W 81–62; W 75–71; W 61–58; L 54–56

== Retired jerseys ==
The Badgers have retired three jerseys in their program history. When Wisconsin retires jerseys the numbers stay in circulation, but a banner hangs in the rafters of the Kohl Center.

Wisconsin Badgers retired jerseys
No.	Player	Tenure	No. retired	Ref.
8	Ab Nicholas	1949–52	2017	
44	Frank Kaminsky	2011–15	2018	
24	Michael Finley	1991–95	2022	

== All-Americans ==
=== Helms Athletic Foundation selections ===
- C. D. McLees (1905)
- Christian Steinmetz (1905)
- Frank Arthur (1907)
- Hugh Harper (1908)
- Helmer Swenholt (1908, 1909)
- Walter Scoville (1911)
- Otto Stangel (1912)
- Allen Johnson (1913)
- Carl Harper (1914)
- Eugene Van Gent (1914)
- George Levis (1915, 1916)
- Bill Chandler (1916, 1918)
- Harold Olsen (1917)
- Eber Simpson (1918)

=== Consensus selections ===
- Gene Englund (1941)
- John Kotz (1942, 1943)
- Don Rehfeldt (1950)
- Devin Harris (2004)
- Alando Tucker (2007)
- Jordan Taylor (2011)
- Frank Kaminsky (2015)
- Ethan Happ (2019)
- Johnny Davis (2022)
- John Tonje (2025)

== National Players of the Year ==
- Christian Steinmetz (1905)
- Otto Stangel (1912)
- George Levis (1916)
- Bill Chandler (1918)
- Frank Kaminsky (2015)

== Basketball Hall of Fame ==
- Christian Steinmetz
- Walter Meanwell
- Harold E. Foster
- Bo Ryan

== Current NBA players ==
- Micah Potter (2021), undrafted, currently playing with the Portland Trail Blazers

== Current NBA G League players ==
- Steven Crowl (2025), currently playing for Salt Lake City Stars, affiliated with the Utah Jazz
- John Tonje (2025), drafted 53rd overall in the 2025 NBA draft by the Utah Jazz, currently playing for the Portland Trail Blazers, on a two-way affiliate with the Rip City Remix

== Current international players ==
- Vitto Brown (2017), currently playing for Japanese team San-en NeoPhoenix in the B.League and East Asia Super League
- Johnny Davis (2022), drafted 10th overall in the 2021 NBA draft by the Washington Wizards, currently playing for Turkish team Körfez Basket in the Basketbol Süper Ligi
- Aleem Ford (2021), currently playing for Puerto Rican team Leones de Ponce in the Baloncesto Superior Nacional
- Carter Gilmore (2025), currently playing for Dutch team Den Helder Suns in the BNXT League
- Ethan Happ (2019), currently playing for Spanish team La Laguna Tenerife in the Liga ACB and EuroCup
- Nigel Hayes-Davis (2017), currently playing for Greek team Panathinaikos B.C. in the Greek Basketball League and EuroLeague
- Markus Ilver (2025), currently playing for Estonian team Ülikool Maks & Moorits in the Latvian–Estonian Basketball League
- Khalil Iverson (2019), currently playing for Mexican team Rayos de Hermosillo in the CIBACOPA
- Max Klesmit (2025), currently playing for Belgian team Kangoeroes Basket Mechelen in the BNXT League
- Kamari McGee (2025), currently playing for Bosnia and Herzegovina team KK Jahorina in the Bosnian League
- Nate Reuvers (2021), currently playing for Spanish team Valencia Basket in the Liga ACB and EuroLeague
- D'Mitrik Trice (2021), currently playing for German team SC Rasta Vechta in the Basketball Bundesliga
- Chris Vogt (2022), currently playing for Argentine team Unión de Santa Fe in the LNB
- Tyler Wahl (2024), currently playing for Latvian team Rīgas Zeļļi in the Latvian–Estonian Basketball League and EuroCup

== Players drafted to the NBA ==
Name	Position	Draft year	Drafted team	Round	Overall pick
Glen Selbo	G	1947	Toronto Huskies	1	2
Bobby Cook	G	1948	Fort Wayne Pistons	2	N/A
Ed Mills	N/A	1948	Chicago Stags	2	N/A
Don Rehfeldt	SF	1950	Baltimore Bullets	1	2
Ab Nicholas	G	1950	Milwaukee Hawks	11	N/A
Ron Weisner	N/A	1954	Milwaukee Hawks	12	97
Dick Cable	N/A	1955	St. Louis Hawks	15	N/A
Dick Miller	N/A	1956	New York Knicks	11	N/A
Ken Siebel	N/A	1963	Baltimore Bullets	6	46
Ron Jackson	N/A	1963	Baltimore Bullets	9	69
Jack Brens	N/A	1964	New York Knicks	9	71
Ken Barnes	N/A	1966	Baltimore Bullets	16	109
Joe Franklin	N/A	1968	Milwaukee Bucks	5	64
Jim Johnson	N/A	1969	Boston Celtics	7	94
John Schell	N/A	1969	Milwaukee Bucks	8	101
Al Henry	C	1970	Philadelphia 76ers	1	12
Clarence Sherrod	N/A	1971	Chicago Bulls	8	134
Gary Watson	N/A	1972	Philadelphia 76ers	10	147
Kim Hughes	C	1974	Buffalo Braves	3	45
Kerry Hughes	F	1974	Cleveland Cavaliers	8	129
Dale Koehler	C	1976	Cleveland Cavaliers	8	123
Bob Johnson	N/A	1976	Detroit Pistons	10	161
Wes Matthews	PG	1980	Washington Bullets	1	14
Joseph Chrnelich	C	1980	New York Knicks	4	82
Claude Gregory	PF	1981	Washington Bullets	2	41
Larry Petty	C	1981	Los Angeles Lakers	7	157
Cory Blackwell	SF	1984	Seattle SuperSonics	2	48
Scott Roth	SF	1985	San Antonio Spurs	4	82
Rick Olson	G	1986	Houston Rockets	7	158
J. J. Weber	C	1987	Milwaukee Bucks	3	64
Michael Finley	SF	1995	Phoenix Suns	1	21
Rashard Griffith	C	1995	Milwaukee Bucks	2	28
Paul Grant	C	1997	Minnesota Timberwolves	1	20
Devin Harris	PG	2004	Washington Wizards	1	5
Alando Tucker	SG	2007	Phoenix Suns	1	29
Jon Leuer	PF	2011	Milwaukee Bucks	2	40
Frank Kaminsky	PF	2015	Charlotte Hornets	1	9
Sam Dekker	SF	2015	Houston Rockets	1	18
Johnny Davis	SG	2022	Washington Wizards	1	10
John Tonje	SF	2025	Utah Jazz	2	53

== All-time statistical leaders ==
=== Single-game leaders ===
- Points scored: Frank Kaminsky (43, November 19, 2013)
- 3-pointers: Braeden Carrington (9, 2026)
- Assists: Tracy Webster (13, 1992)
- Rebounds: Paul Morrow (30, 1953)
- Steals: Mike Kelley (10, 1999) & Michael Finley (10, 1993)
- Blocked shots: Nate Reuvers x2 (9, 2018 & 2019)
- Free throws: John Tonje (21, 2024)

=== Single-season leaders ===
- Points scored: Frank Kaminsky (732, 2014–15)
- Scoring average: Clarence Sherrod (23.8, 1970–71)
- Field goal percentage: Patrick Tompkins (63.6% 164–258, 1990–91)
- 3-pointers scored: Bronson Koenig (103, 2016–17)
- 3-point percentage: Tracy Webster (49.0% 75–153, 1991–92)
- Free throw percentage: John Tonje (.909% 231–254, 2024–25)
- Rebounds: Jim Clinton (344, 1950–51)
- Rebounding average: Jim Clinton (15.6, 1950–51)
- Assists: Tracy Webster (179, 1992–93)
- Assist-to-turnover ratio: Mike Kelley (4.30, 1998–99)
- Blocked shots: Brad Sellers (68, 1982–83)
- Triple-doubles: Ethan Happ (2, 2018–19)

=== Career statistical leaders ===
- Points scored: Alando Tucker (2,217, 2002–07)
- Scoring average: Clarence Sherrod (19.6, 1969–71)
- Field goal percentage: Patrick Tompkins (57.3% 306–534, 1988–91)
- 3-pointers scored: Brad Davison (300, 2017–2022)
- 3-point percentage: Tim Locum (47.2% 227–481, 1988–91)
- Free throws made: Nigel Hayes (546, 2013–17)
- Free throws percentage: Rick Olson (87.0 260–299, 1983–86)
- Rebounds: Ethan Happ (1,217, 2015–2019)
- Assists: Tracy Webster (501, 1992–94)
- Assist-to-turnover ratio: Jordan Taylor (3.01 464–154, 2009–12)
- Steals: Mike Kelley (275, 1998–01)
- Blocked shots: Ethan Happ (154, 2015–2019)
- Games played: Tyler Wahl (162, 2019–24)
- Triple-doubles: Ethan Happ (2, 2015–19)

=== 1,000-point scorers ===
- Alando Tucker (2,217, 2002–07)
- Michael Finley (2,147, 1991–95)
- Ethan Happ (2,130, 2015–19)
- Nigel Hayes (1,857, 2013–17)
- Danny Jones (1,854, 1986–90)
- Brad Davison (1,827, 2017–22)
- Claude Gregory (1,745, 1977–81)
- Rick Olson (1,736, 1982–86)
- Trent Jackson (1,545, 1985–89)
- Jordan Taylor (1,533, 2008–12)
- Mike Wilkinson (1,532, 2001–05)
- John Blackwell (1,505, 2023–26)
- Steven Crowl (1,490, 2020–25)
- Bronson Koenig (1,459, 2013–17)
- Frank Kaminsky (1,458, 2011–15)
- Kirk Penney (1,454, 1999–03)
- D'Mitrik Trice (1,430, 2016–21)
- Devin Harris (1,425, 2001–04)
- Clarence Sherrod (1,408, 1968–71)
- Cory Blackwell (1,405, 1981–84)
- Jon Leuer (1,376, 2007–11)
- Sam Dekker (1,363, 2012–15)
- Tyler Wahl (1,350, 2019–24)
- Trevon Hughes (1,339, 2006–10)
- Sean Mason (1,294, 1994–99)
- Tracy Webster (1,264, 1991–94)
- Wes Matthews (1,251, 1977–80)
- Kammron Taylor (1,223, 2003–07)
- Joe Franklin (1,215, 1965–68)
- Dale Koehler (1,200, 1972–76)
- Dick Cable (1,180, 1951–55)
- Joe Chrnelich (1,171, 1976–80)
- Jason Bohannon (1,170, 2006–10)
- Don Rehfeldt (1,169, 1944–50)
- Leon Howard (1,165, 1970–73)
- Scott Roth (1,156, 1981–85)
- Ben Brust (1,148, 2010–14)
- James Johnson (1,147, 1966–69)
- Brian Butch (1,115, 2004–08)
- Marcus Landry (1,114, 2005–09)
- Ken Siebel (1,084, 1960–63)
- Nate Reuvers (1,078, 2017–21)
- Tim Locum (1,077, 1987–91)
- Josh Gasser (1,075, 2010–15)
- Larry Petty (1,066, 1977–81)
- Mark Vershaw (1,066, 1997–01)
- Chuck Nagle (1,064, 1967–70)
- Sean Daugherty (1,057, 1994–98)
- J.J. Weber (1,021, 1983–87)
- Willie Simms (1,015, 1987–91)
- Chucky Hepburn (1,013, 2021–24)
