= 1940–41 Baylor Bears basketball team =

American college basketball season

1940–41 Baylor Bears men's basketball
- Conference: Southwest Conference
- Record: 11-11 (6-6 SWC)
- Head coach: Ralph Wolf

1940–41 Southwest Conference men's basketball standings
	Conf.				Overall
Team	W		L	PCT	W		L	PCT
Arkansas	12	–	0	1.000	20	–	3	.870
Rice	8	–	4	.667	18	–	6	.750
Texas	7	–	5	.583	14	–	10	.583
SMU	6	–	6	.500	10	–	10	.500
Baylor	6	–	6	.500	10	–	12	.455
Texas A&M	3	–	9	.250	7	–	13	.350
TCU	0	–	12	.000	5	–	16	.238

The 1940-41 Baylor Bears basketball team represented the Baylor University during the 1940-41 college men's basketball season.

== Schedule ==
Date time, TV	Opponent	Result	Record	Site city, state
*	at Stephen F. Austin	W 44-35	1-0	Nacogdoches, TX
*	at Stephen F. Austin	W 50-48	2-0	Nacogdoches, TX
*	Southeastern Oklahoma St.	W 37-21	3-0	Waco, TX
*	Southeastern Oklahoma St.	L 27-32	3-1	Waco, TX
*	Phillips 66	L 44-48	3-2	Waco, TX
*	Southeastern Oklahoma St.	L 32-40	3-3	Oklahoma City, OK
*	Tulsa	L 47-51	3-4	Oklahoma City, OK
*	Southwest Missouri	W 60-35	4-4	Oklahoma City, OK
*	Wyoming	W 54-50	5-4	Oklahoma City, OK
*	North Texas	L 45-47	5-5	Waco, TX
	at TCU	W 40-32	6-5	Fort Worth, TX
	SMU	W 34-30	7-5	Waco, TX
	at Rice	L 32-52	7-6	Houston, TX
	at Texas A&M	L 31-33	7-7	College Station, TX
	TCU	W 48-39	8-7	Waco, TX
	at SMU	W 55-45	9-7	Dallas, TX
	at Arkansas	L 48-62	9-8	Fayetteville, AR
	at Arkansas	L 31-36	9-9	Fayetteville, AR
	Texas	L 44-45	9-10	Waco, TX
	at Texas	W 52-48	10-10	Austin, TX
	Rice	L 60-62	10-11	Waco, TX
	Texas A&M	W 52-39	11-11	Waco, TX
*Non-conference game. (#) Tournament seedings in parentheses.
