= John Drish =

American basketball and baseball player

John William Drish
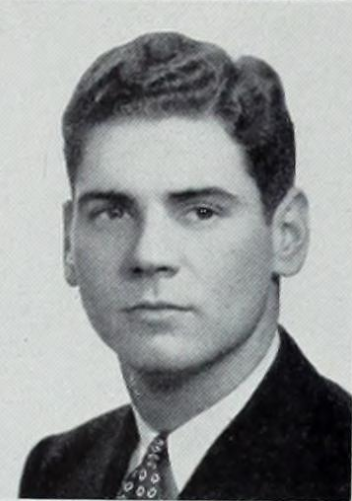
- John Drish from the Illio, 1941

Personal information
- Born: October 3, 1920 Chicago, Illinois
- Died: February 24, 1977 (aged 56) Evanston, Illinois

Career information
- High school: Morton (Cicero, Illinois)
- College: Illinois (1937–1941)
- Playing career: 1941–1942
- Position: Forward
- Number: 21

Career history
- 1941–1942: Chicago Bruins

Career highlights
- University of Illinois Athlete of the Year (1941)

John William Drish (October 3, 1920 – February 24, 1977) was an American basketball and baseball player.

A forward from Chicago, Illinois, Drish played collegiately at the University of Illinois, earning the University of Illinois Athlete of the Year award in 1941. From 1941 to 1942, he played in the National Basketball League as a member of the Chicago Bruins. He averaged 2.9 points per game in his career that was cut short by World War II when Drish was called to active service.

== High school ==
A native of Chicago, Illinois, Drish attended Morton High School in Cicero, Illinois from 1933–34 to 1936–37.

== College ==
In the fall of 1937, Drish enrolled at the University of Illinois and was a member of the freshman basketball team. In his sophomore year he was the starting forward of the 1938–39 Fighting Illini team that finished third in the Big Ten with an overall record of 14–5 and a conference record of 8–4. Drish joined his high school teammate Bill Hapac on an Illini team that also included All-American Pick Dehner.

The 1939–40 season saw the Illini with a fourth place finish in the conference at 7 wins and 5 losses while finishing the regular season with an overall record of 14 wins and 6 losses. After the season, Drish would be named captain for the following season on a team that would be adding Art Mathisen, who would become a member of "The Whiz Kids". Drish would play in 18 of the team's 20 games during his junior season, scoring 47 points and average 2.35 points per game.

The 1940–41 campaign was the best of Drish's time at Illinois. Drish would play in all of the team's 20 games during the season, scoring 94 points and average 4.7 points per game. The team compiled an overall record of 13 wins and 7 losses with a conference record of 7 wins and 5 losses, finishing third in the Big Ten. Head coach Doug Mills was one season away from his second Big Ten championship on a team that would add Andy Phillip, Ken Menke and Jack Smiley, the remaining "Whiz Kids". In his three years of varsity basketball, Drish played in 57 of the team's 59 games where his teams would win 41 while losing only 18 (win pct=69.5%).

On May 15, 1941, Drish earned the University of Illinois Athlete of the Year award. He was a six-time Varsity letter winner (3 basketball and 3 baseball). As a baseball player, Drish was a pitcher, second baseman and played right field. Ironically, this was the second year in a row for an athlete coming from Morton High School to be named Athlete of the Year, Bill Hapac was the previous winner.

== Professional basketball ==
After leaving the University of Illinois, Drish played professionally for one season in the National Basketball League, where he played for the Chicago Bruins. He only played for a portion of the 1941–42 season as the military drafted him into the United States Army in order to serve during World War II. He played in 8 games and averaged 2.9 points per game for the Bruins.

== Personal life and death ==
Drish was the son of John Paul and Irene Drish and would marry Dorothy. Their marriage resulted in the birth of one daughter and five sons.

Drish worked as an engineer at Illinois Bell after his military service. In 1956 he and his wife formed the Citizen's Committee for Employment, which was an organization that helped convicts get back into society. Later he and Dorothy founded the Safer Foundation, which dealt with the same societal issues. The couple were intensely involved in prison ministry for over 35 years, providing temporary shelter for parolees and helping them get jobs or education. They also took in over 100 foster children into their home in Evanston.

On February 24, 1977, Drish died in his Evanston home.

== Honors ==
- Team captain (1941)
- University of Illinois Athlete of the Year (1941)

== Career statistics ==
Legend
| GP | Games played | GS | Games started | MPG | Minutes per game |
| FG% | Field goal percentage | 3P% | 3-point field goal percentage | FT% | Free throw percentage |
| RPG | Rebounds per game | APG | Assists per game | SPG | Steals per game |
| BPG | Blocks per game | PPG | Points per game | **Bold** | Career high |

=== College ===
| Season | Games | Points | PPG | Big Ten Record | Overall Record | Highlight |
|---|---|---|---|---|---|---|
| 1938–39 | 19 | - | - | 8–4 | 14–5 | - |
| 1939–40 | 18 | 47 | 2.35 | 7–5 | 14–6 | - |
| 1940–41 | 20 | 94 | 4.7 | 7–5 | 13–7 | - |
| **Totals** | **57** | - | - | **22–14** | **41–18** | |

=== NBL ===
==== Regular season ====
| Year | Team | GP | FGM | FTM | PTS | PPG |
|---|---|---|---|---|---|---|
| 1941–42 | Chicago | 8 | 10 | 3 | 23 | 2.9 |
