= 1940–41 UCLA Bruins men's basketball team =

American college basketball season

1940–41 UCLA Bruins men's basketball
- Conference: Pacific Coast Conference
- South
- Record: 6–20 (2–10 PCC)
- Head coach: Wilbur Johns (2nd season)
- Assistant coach: Don Ashen
- Home arena: Men's Gym

1940–41 Pacific Coast Conference men's basketball standings
	Conf.				Overall
Team	W		L	PCT	W		L	PCT
North
Washington State †	13	–	3	.813	26	–	6	.813
Oregon State	9	–	7	.563	19	–	9	.679
Oregon	7	–	9	.438	18	–	18	.500
Washington	7	–	9	.438	12	–	13	.480
Idaho	4	–	12	.250	14	–	15	.483
South
Stanford	10	–	2	.833	21	–	5	.808
California	6	–	6	.500	15	–	12	.556
USC	6	–	6	.500	15	–	10	.600
UCLA	2	–	10	.167	6	–	20	.231
† Conference playoff series winner

The 1940–41 UCLA Bruins men's basketball team represented the University of California, Los Angeles during the 1940–41 NCAA men's basketball season and were members of the Pacific Coast Conference. The Bruins were led by second year head coach Wilbur Johns. They finished the regular season with a record of 6–20 and were fourth in the PCC southern division with a record of 2–10.

== Previous season ==
The Bruins finished the regular season with a record of 8–17 and were fourth in the PCC southern division with a record of 3–9.

== Roster ==
1940–41 UCLA Bruins men's basketball team
Players
Coaches

Pos.	#	Name	Height	Weight	Year	Hometown
G	5	Bob Alshuler	—	—
F	4	Lloyd Anderson (C)	—	—
G	21	Noah Curtis	—	—
F	3	Ted Forbes	—	—
C	11	John Fryer	—	—
G	15	Clark George	—	—
C	7	Larry Gittler	—	—
F	6	Ernie Handelsman	—	—
C	20	Roger Hillis	—	—
G	9	Bob Null (C)	—	—
G	17	Audre Richardson	—	—
F	18	Jackie Robinson	—	—	Sr	Cairo, Georgia
C	13	Roger Terry	—	—

Head coach

Wilbur Johns (UCLA)

Assistant coach(es)

- Don Ashen (UCLA)

Legend

- (C) Team captain
- (S) Suspended
- (I) Ineligible
- (W) Walk-on
- Injured
- Current redshirt

Roster
Last update: 30 January 2018

== Schedule ==
Date time, TV	Rank^{#}	Opponent^{#}	Result	Record	Site city, state
Regular Season
*		at San Diego State	L 28–33	0–1	San Diego, CA
*		at San Diego State	L 31–34	0–2	San Diego, CA
*		at 20th Century Fox	L 26–38	0–3	Los Angeles City College Gym; Los Angeles, CA
*		at DePaul	L 23–30	0–4	Chicago, IL
*		at Western State	L 43–56	0–5	Gunnison, CO
*		at Bradley	L 49–52	0–6	Bradley Institute Gymnasium; Peoria, IL
*		at Illinois State	L 21–37	0–7	McCormick Gymnasium; Normal, IL
*		Indiana	L 26–51	0–8	Men's Gym; Los Angeles, CA
*		Loyola Marymount	W 39–38	1–8	Men's Gym; Los Angeles, CA
*		Bradley	L 27–36	1–9	Men's Gym; Los Angeles, CA
*		San Francisco	W 55–53	2–9	Men's Gym; Los Angeles, CA
*		St. Mary's	W 45–29	3–9	Men's Gym; Los Angeles, CA
		USC	L 35–56	3–10 (0–1)	Men's Gym; Los Angeles, CA
		California	L 32–42	3–11 (0–2)	Men's Gym; Los Angeles, CA
		California	W 35–33	4–11 (1–2)	Men's Gym; Los Angeles, CA
*		at Bank of America	L 37–44	4–12	Los Angeles City College Gym; Los Angeles, CA
		Stanford	L 44–54	4–13 (1–3)	Men's Gym; Los Angeles, CA
		Stanford	W 45–44	5–13 (2–3)	Men's Gym; Los Angeles, CA
		USC	L 41–43	5–14 (2–4)	Men's Gym; Los Angeles, CA
*		at St. Mary's	W 45–40	6–14	Moraga, CA
		at California	L 32–54	6–15 (2–5)	Men's Gym; Berkeley, CA
		at California	L 28–30	6–16 (2–6)	Men's Gym; Berkeley, CA
		at Stanford	L 44–49	6–17 (2–7)	Stanford Pavilion; Stanford, CA
		at Stanford	L 34–56	6–18 (2–8)	Stanford Pavilion; Stanford, CA
		at USC	L 47–53	6–19 (2–9)	Shrine Auditorium; Los Angeles, CA
		at USC	L 37–52	6–20 (2–10)	Shrine Auditorium; Los Angeles, CA
*Non-conference game. ^{#}Rankings from AP Poll. (#) Tournament seedings in parentheses. All times are in Pacific Time.
