= Douglas R. Mills =

Biographical details
- Born: April 9, 1907; Elgin, Illinois, U.S.
- Died: August 12, 1993 (aged 86); Urbana, Illinois, U.S.

Playing career

Football
- 1927–1929: Illinois

Basketball
- 1927–1930: Illinois
- Position: Quarterback (football)

Coaching career (HC unless noted)

Football
- 1936–1941: Illinois (assistant)

Basketball
- 1931–1935: Joliet Central HS
- 1936–1947: Illinois

Administrative career (AD unless noted)
- 1941–1966: Illinois

Head coaching record
- Overall: 151–66 (college); 68–36 (high school)

Accomplishments and honors

Championships
- As coach: 3 Big Ten (1937, 1942, 1943); As player: National (1927)

Awards
- 100 Legends of the IHSA Boys Basketball Tournament (2007)

Douglas Raymond "Gaga" Mills (April 9, 1907 – August 12, 1993), a native of Elgin, Illinois, was a high school and college basketball player and coach in the state of Illinois. During high school, Mills was the first player in the state to lead his team to back-to-back titles in 1924 and 1925. He totaled 32 points in four state tournament games for Elgin High School during an era of low-scoring play. Mills played for the Illinois Fighting Illini men's basketball team from 1927 to 1930 followed by a five-year coaching stint at Joliet Township High School. He led his Joliet team to the state tournament in 1935. He returned to the U of I as head men's basketball coach from 1936 to 1947. He coached the famous "Whiz Kids" and also served as the Fighting Illini's athletic director. Mills died in 1993.

While coaching at Illinois, Mills compiled a record of 151 wins and 66 losses, winning three conference titles during his tenure. He added the athletic director's post in 1941. In 1947, he stepped down as head coach to concentrate on his duties as athletic director, naming Champaign High coach Harry Combes as his successor. He was also responsible for hiring football coaches Ray Eliot and Pete Elliott. When Mills resigned his position as AD in 1966, it triggered the slush fund scandal. In 2007, the Illinois High School Association named Mills one of the 100 Legends of the IHSA Boys Basketball Tournament.

He and his wife, Lorene Muntz, had a daughter, Sally, who died from a ruptured appendix. The two later adopted two children, Peter G. Mills and the late Molly M. Mills.

Doug and Lorene divorced in the early 1960s. Neither ever remarried.

== Head coaching record ==
=== High school ===
School	Season	Record	Postseason
Joliet Township HS	1930-31	12-10	
Joliet Township HS	1931-32	16-3	
Joliet Township HS	1932-33	10-9	
Joliet Township HS	1933-34	18-4	District Champions
Joliet Township HS	1934-35	12-10	State Quarterfinalist
Coaching totals	1930-35	68-36	

=== College ===
Record table
Season	Team	Overall	Conference	Standing	Postseason
Illinois Fighting Illini (Big Ten Conference) (1936–1947)
1936–37	Illinois	14–4	10–2	T–1st	
1937–38	Illinois	9–9	4–8	T–8th	
1938–39	Illinois	14–5	8–4	3rd	
1939–40	Illinois	14–6	7–5	T–4th	
1940–41	Illinois	13–7	7–5	T–3rd	
1941–42	Illinois	18–5	13–2	1st	
1942–43	Illinois	17–1	12–0	1st	
1943–44	Illinois	11–9	5–7	6th	
1944–45	Illinois	13–7	7–5	3rd	
1945–46	Illinois	14–7	7–5	T–5th	
1946–47	Illinois	13–7	8–4	T–2nd	
Illinois:		151–66 (.696)	88–47 (.652)		
Total:		151–66 (.696)			
National champion Postseason invitational champion Conference regular season champion Conference regular season and conference tournament champion Division regular season champion Division regular season and conference tournament champion Conference tournament champion
