= Jack Sterrett =

American football and basketball coach

Biographical details
- Born: 1901
- Died: 1984 (aged 82–83)

Coaching career (HC unless noted)

Football
- 1926–1930: Glencoe HS (MN)
- 1931–1934: Bemidji State
- 1935–1936: St. Thomas (MN)
- 1940: Tulsa (scout)

Basketball
- 1931–1935: Bemidji State
- 1935–1937: St. Thomas (MN)
- 1937–1938: Iowa (assistant)
- 1938–1940: Saint Louis
- 1940–1941: Tulsa
- 1941–1942: Wichita

Head coaching record
- Overall: 16–26–4 (college football); 54–112 (college basketball)

John E. "Cactus Jack" Sterrett (1901 – 1984) was an American football and basketball coach. He served as the head football coach at Bemidji State University from 1931 to 1934 and at the University of St. Thomas in St. Paul, Minnesota from 1935 to 1936, compiling a career college football coaching record of 16–26–4. Sterrett was also a head basketball coach at a number of different schools, including Bemidji State, Saint Louis University, and Wichita State University.

== Head coaching record ==
=== College football ===
Year	Team	Overall	Conference	Standing	Bowl/playoffs
Bemidji State Beavers (Independent) (1931)
1931	Bemidji State	3–4			
Bemidji State Beavers (Northern Teachers Athletic Conference) (1932–1934)
1932	Bemidji State	2–4–1	1–3	T–5th	
1933	Bemidji State	3–3–1	2–3	4th	
1934	Bemidji State	3–5	1–4	6th	
Bemidji State:		11–16–2	4–10		
St. Thomas Tommies (Minnesota Intercollegiate Athletic Conference) (1935–1936)
1935	St. Thomas	4–3–2	3–1–2	4th	
1936	St. Thomas	1–7	1–4	T–7th	
St. Thomas:		5–10–2	4–5–2		
Total:		16–26–4			

=== College basketball ===
Record table
Season	Team	Overall	Conference	Standing	Postseason
Bemidji State Beavers (Independent) (1931–1932)
1931–32	Bemidji State	4–8			
Bemidji State Beavers (Northern Teachers Athletic Conference) (1932–1935)
1932–33	Bemidji State	8–6	5–4	3rd	
1933–34	Bemidji State	2–13	1–8	6th	
1934–35	Bemidji State	1–9	1–7	6th	
Bemidji State:		15–36	9–19		
St. Thomas Tommies (Minnesota Intercollegiate Athletic Conference) (1935–1937)
1935–36	St. Thomas	9–12			
1936–37	St. Thomas	5–9			
St. Thomas:		14–21			
Saint Louis Billikens (Missouri Valley Conference) (1938–1940)
1938–39	Saint Louis	5–16	3–11	7th	
1939–40	Saint Louis	4–14	2–10	T–6th	
Saint Louis:		9–30	5–21		
Tulsa Golden Hurricane (Missouri Valley Conference) (1940–1941)
1940–41	Tulsa	12–9	7–5	3rd	
Tulsa:		12–9	7–5		
Wichita Shockers (Independent) (1941–1942)
1941–42	Wichita	4–16			
Wichita:		4–16			
Total:		54–112			
