= 1940–41 Georgia Bulldogs basketball team =

American college basketball season

1940–41 Georgia Bulldogs basketball
- Conference: Southeastern Conference
- Record: 13–11 (6–7 SEC)
- Head coach: Elmer A. Lampe (4th season)
- Captain: Dan Kirkland
- Home arena: Woodruff Hall

1940–41 Southeastern Conference men's basketball standings
	Conf.				Overall
Team	W		L	PCT	W		L	PCT
Kentucky	8	–	1	.889	17	–	8	.680
Florida	6	–	2	.750	15	–	9	.625
Tennessee †	8	–	3	.727	17	–	5	.773
Alabama	11	–	7	.611	14	–	8	.636
LSU	7	–	5	.583	9	–	9	.500
Auburn	6	–	5	.545	13	–	6	.684
Tulane	6	–	5	.545	8	–	6	.571
Mississippi State	6	–	6	.500	12	–	10	.545
Georgia	6	–	7	.462	13	–	11	.542
Georgia Tech	4	–	8	.333	8	–	11	.421
Vanderbilt	3	–	9	.250	8	–	9	.471
Ole Miss	2	–	15	.118	2	–	18	.100
† Regular-season championship and SEC Tournament winner

The 1940–41 Georgia Bulldogs basketball team represented the University of Georgia as a member of the Southeastern Conference (SEC) during the 1940–41 NCAA men's basketball season. Led by fourth-year head coach Elmer A. Lampe, the Bulldogs compiled an overall record of 13–11 with a mark of 6–7 in conference play, placing ninth in the SEC. The team captain was Dan Kirkland.

== Schedule ==
Date time, TV	Opponent	Result	Record	Site city, state
12/1/1940	Rockmart Semi-Pro	W 59-31	1–0	Athens, GA
12/5/1940	at Chicago	W 38-31	2–0	
12/6/1940	at Illinois	L 34-38	2–1	
12/7/1940	at Indiana	L 31-44	2–2	
12/13/1940	at Clemson	W 65-51	3–2	
1/2/1941	Clemson	W 58-43	4–2	Athens, GA
1/6/1941	S. Carolina	L 44-48	4–3	Athens, GA
1/10/1941	at Florida	L 34-39	4–4	
1/11/1941	at Florida	L 42-44	4–5	
1/17/1941	Vanderbilt	W 50-44	5–5	Athens, GA
1/24/1941	at Sewanee	W 46-19	6–5	
1/25/1941	at Tennessee	L 23-46	6–6	
1/28/1941	Mercer	W 59-47	7–6	Athens, GA
2/1/1941	Tennessee	W 47-36	8–6	Athens, GA
2/4/1941	USC	W 50-43	9–6	Athens, GA
2/7/1941	Georgia Tech	W 31-26	10–6	Athens, GA
2/8/1941	at Auburn	L 39-43	10–7	
2/10/1941	Florida	W 46-40	11–7	Athens, GA
2/11/1941	Florida	L 44-46	11–8	Athens, GA
2/15/1941	at Ole Miss	W 53-46	12–8	
2/17/1941	at Alabama	L 37-42	12–9	
2/20/1941	at Georgia Tech	L 44-52	12–10	
2/26/1941	Auburn	W 36-31	13–10	Athens, GA
2/28/1941	Tennessee	L 39-41	13–11	Athens, GA
*Non-conference game. (#) Tournament seedings in parentheses.
