= 1940–41 Washington Huskies men's basketball team =

American college basketball season

1940–41 Washington Huskies men's basketball
- Conference: Pacific Coast Conference
- Record: 12–13 (7–9 PCC)
- Head coach: Hec Edmundson (21st season)
- Captain: Jack Voelker
- Home arena: UW Pavilion

1940–41 Pacific Coast Conference men's basketball standings
	Conf.				Overall
Team	W		L	PCT	W		L	PCT
North
Washington State †	13	–	3	.813	26	–	6	.813
Oregon State	9	–	7	.563	19	–	9	.679
Oregon	7	–	9	.438	18	–	18	.500
Washington	7	–	9	.438	12	–	13	.480
Idaho	4	–	12	.250	14	–	15	.483
South
Stanford	10	–	2	.833	21	–	5	.808
California	6	–	6	.500	15	–	12	.556
USC	6	–	6	.500	15	–	10	.600
UCLA	2	–	10	.167	6	–	20	.231
† Conference playoff series winner

The 1940–41 Washington Huskies men's basketball team represented the University of Washington for the 1940–41 NCAA college basketball season. Led by 21st-year head coach Hec Edmundson, the Huskies were members of the Pacific Coast Conference and played their home games on campus at the UW Pavilion in Seattle, Washington.

The Huskies were 12–13 overall in the regular season and 7–9 in conference play; tied for third in the Northern division. Washington opened conference play with four wins, but then lost nine straight; they won their last three to climb out of fourth place.
