= 1940–41 La Salle Explorers men's basketball team =

American college basketball season

1940–41 La Salle Explorers men's basketball
- Conference: Independent
- Record: 11–8
- Head coach: Leonard Tanseer (8th season)
- Captains: Gene Gillen; John Brnich
- Home arena: Wister Hall

The 1940–41 La Salle Explorers men's basketball team represented La Salle University during the 1940–41 NCAA men's basketball season. The head coach was Leonard Tanseer, coaching the explorers in his eighth season. The team finished with an overall record of 11–8.

== Schedule ==
Date time, TV	Opponent	Result	Record	Site city, state
Dec 1, 1940	Loyola (MD)	W 53–44	1–0	Wister Hall; Philadelphia, PA
Dec. 3, 1940	at Wyomissing P.I.	W 54–41	2–0	
Dec 5, 1940	Morris–Harvey	W 34–28	3–0	Wister Hall; Philadelphia, PA
Dec. 17, 1940	Washington College	W 51–22	4–0	Wister Hall; Philadelphia, PA
Dec. 24, 1940	Rice	L 45–51	4–1	Wister Hall; Philadelphia, PA
Jan. 3, 1941	Santa Clara	W 41–37	5–1	Wister Hall; Philadelphia, PA
Jan. 8, 1941	Davis-Elkins	W 44–43	6–1	Wister Hall; Philadelphia, PA
Jan. 12, 1941	Moravian	W 48–22	7–1	Wister Hall; Philadelphia, PA
Jan. 17, 1941	Temple	L 22–27	7–2	Wister Hall; Philadelphia, PA
Jan. 26, 1941	at Akron	W 43–37	8–2	Buffalo, NY
Jan. 28, 1941	at Scranton	L 45–47	8–3	Scranton, PA
Feb. 4, 1941	West Chester	W 43–31	9–3	Wister Hall; Philadelphia, PA
Feb. 12, 1941	Manhattan	L 44–53	9–4	Wister Hall; Philadelphia, PA
Feb. 14, 1941	Saint Joseph's	L 40–48	9–5	Wister Hall; Philadelphia, PA
Feb. 20, 1941	Long Island	L 41–42	9–6	Wister Hall; Philadelphia, PA
Feb. 24, 1941	at Muhlenberg	L 49–51	9–7	Allentown, PA
Feb. 26, 1941	LSC Faculty	W 50–35	10–7	Wister Hall; Philadelphia, PA
Feb. 28, 1941	Alumni	W 43–36	11–7	Wister Hall; Philadelphia, PA
Mar. 2, 1941	Toledo	L 43–56	11–8	Wister Hall; Philadelphia, PA
*Non-conference game. (#) Tournament seedings in parentheses.
