= Gene Englund =

American basketball player (1917–1995)

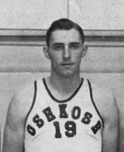

Personal information
- Born: October 21, 1917 Kenosha, Wisconsin, U.S.
- Died: November 5, 1995 (aged 78) Winnebago, Wisconsin, U.S.
- Listed height: 6 ft 5 in (1.96 m)
- Listed weight: 205 lb (93 kg)

Career information
- High school: Bradford (Kenosha, Wisconsin)
- College: Wisconsin (1937–1941)
- Playing career: 1941–1950
- Position: Forward / center
- Number: 10, 12

Career history

Playing
- 1941–1943: Oshkosh All-Stars
- 1943–1944: Brooklyn Indians
- 1946–1949: Oshkosh All-Stars
- 1949–1950: Boston Celtics
- 1950: Tri-Cities Blackhawks

Coaching
- 1949: Oshkosh All-Stars (interim HC)

Career highlights
- NBL champion (1942); All-NBL First Team (1949); NCAA champion (1941); Consensus first-team All-American (1941)

Career NBA statistics
- Points: 360
- Rebounds: Not tracked
- Assists: 41
- Stats at NBA.com
- Stats at Basketball Reference

Gene Eniar Englund (October 21, 1917 – November 5, 1995) was an American professional basketball player. He played in the National Basketball Association (NBA) for one season, 1949–50, and split the season playing for the Boston Celtics and Tri-Cities Blackhawks. Although he played professionally, Englund is best remembered for being a star college basketball player for Wisconsin, where as a senior in 1940–41 he led the Badgers to win the NCAA national championship.

== Early life ==
Englund was born in Kenosha, Wisconsin. He attended Kenosha High School in Kenosha where he graduated in 1936. When deciding where to play college basketball, he decided to stick close to home and enrolled at the University of Wisconsin (now University of Wisconsin–Madison).

== College ==
As a 6 ft 5 in (1.96 m), 205-lb (93 kg) forward and center, Englund was a large player for the late 1930s and early 1940s. He broke out during his senior season in 1940–41 when he was team captain. He scored 162 points in Big Ten Conference games, which set a new conference scoring record at the time, and was also named the Big Ten MVP. Additionally, he (alongside star teammate John Kotz) led Wisconsin to the school's first and only men's basketball national championship when they defeated Washington State, 39–34. At the end of the season Englund was named a consensus Second Team All-American.

== Professional career ==
When Englund graduated from college in the spring of 1941, the major professional basketball league was the National Basketball League (NBL). From the 1941–42 season through the 1943–44 one, and again from 1946 to 1949, he played for the NBL's Oshkosh All-Stars (in 1943–44 he also played for the American Basketball League's Brooklyn Indians). Englund won the NBL Championship as a rookie in 1941–42, leading his team in scoring while making seven field goals and three free throws en route to 17 points. The All-Stars also lost the NBL championships in 1942–43 and 1945–46 while Englund played for them. Although he was never a superstar in the league, he did manage to finish third all-time in NBL points scored when the league merged with the Basketball Association of America (BAA) in 1949, resulting in the formation of the present-day NBA. Most of the way into the 1948–49 season with Oshkosh, then-coach Lon Darling resigned and Englund took over as a player-coach for the remainder of the year. He compiled a 3–1 regular season record and a 3–4 playoffs record as coach.

At age 32 in 1949–50, Englund was well past his basketball playing prime. He lasted only one season in the NBA, splitting the year with first the Boston Celtics and then the Tri-Cities Blackhawks. After playing in 24 games for the Celtics while averaging 8.2 points per game, he was traded on January 29, 1950 for John Mahnken. Englund finished the year out by appearing in 22 games for Tri-Cities and averaged 7.5 points per game.

== Later life ==
After his playing career was over, Englund became an official for the Big Ten and NBA. He died on November 5, 1995, in Winnebago, Wisconsin.

== NBA career statistics ==
Legend
GP	Games played	FG%	Field-goal percentage
FT%	Free-throw percentage	APG	Assists per game
PPG	Points per game	**Bold**	Career high

=== Regular season ===
Year	Team	GP	FG%	FT%	APG	PPG
1949–50	Boston	**24**	.372	**.811**	.7	**8.2**
1949–50	Tri-Cities	22	**.389**	.767	**1.1**	7.5
Career		46	.380	.792	.9	7.8

=== Playoffs ===
Year	Team	GP	FG%	FT%	APG	PPG
1950	Tri-Cities	2	.200	.818	.5	5.5
Career		2	.200	.818	.5	5.5
