= 1940–41 Illinois Fighting Illini men's basketball team =

American college basketball season

1940–41 Illinois Fighting Illini men's basketball
- Conference: Big Ten Conference
- Record: 13–7 (7-5 Big Ten)
- Head coach: Douglas Mills (5th season)
- Assistant coaches: Howie Braun (4th season); Wally Roettger (6th season)
- MVP: Bob Richmond
- Captain: John Drish
- Home arena: Huff Hall

1940–41 Big Ten Conference men's basketball standings
	Conf.				Overall
Team	W		L	PCT	W		L	PCT
Wisconsin	11	–	1	.917	20	–	3	.870
Indiana	10	–	2	.833	17	–	3	.850
Illinois	7	–	5	.583	13	–	7	.650
Minnesota	7	–	5	.583	11	–	9	.550
Ohio State	7	–	5	.583	10	–	10	.500
Purdue	6	–	6	.500	13	–	7	.650
Michigan	5	–	7	.417	9	–	10	.474
Iowa	4	–	8	.333	12	–	8	.600
Northwestern	3	–	9	.250	7	–	11	.389
Chicago	0	–	12	.000	4	–	16	.200

The 1940–41 Illinois Fighting Illini men's basketball team represented the University of Illinois.

== Regular season ==
A new decade had begun for the Fighting Illini, a decade which brought much success to Illinois basketball. Head Coach Doug Mills led the Illini to consecutive Big Ten titles in 1942 and 1943. The Illini would add another league championship under Harry Combes in 1949. The Illini were the 13th-winningest Division I team in the nation in the 1940s. Illinois’ 150–57 record and .725 winning percentage was the best in the Big Ten. In 1941, Mills added to his coaching duties when he was named the school's athletic director as well as continuing on as the head coach. Mills entered his fifth season with the Illini and, just as his teams had done the previous 4 seasons, had a nearly perfect record on the home court finishing with an 8–2 record. Unfortunately for the Illini they finished with a 5–5 record on the road to finish in a third place tie overall in conference action. Mills' team featured 8 returning letterman and had a starting lineup including team captain John Drish and Harold Shapiro at forward, Art Mathisen at the center position, and Victor Wukovits and Robert Richmond as guards. The team also featured future major league baseball player Walter Evers

=== Roster ===
1940–41 Illinois Fighting Illini men's basketball team
Players
Coaches

Pos.	#	Name	Height	Weight	Year	Hometown
G	4	Henry Sachs	—	—	Jr	Chicago, Illinois
F	5	Walter Evers	—	—	Jr	Collinsville, Illinois
C	6	Robert O'Neill	—	—	Sr	Pitman, New Jersey
G	12	Robert Richmond	—	—	Sr	Johnston City, Illinois
C	13	Victor Wukovits	—	—	Jr	Mishawaka, Indiana
G	14	Raymond Bergeson	—	—	So	Bridgeton, New Jersey
F	15	Ralph Hooker	—	—	So	Sidell, Illinois
G	16	William Hocking	—	—	Jr	Evanston, Illinois
F	17	Richard Albaugh	—	—	So	Darien, Illinois
G	18	R. Keith Brown	—	—	Fr	Pekin, Illinois
C	19	Arthur Mathisen	—	—	So	Dwight, Illinois
G	20	Harold Shapiro	—	—	Sr	Chicago, Illinois
F	21	John Drish (C)	—	—	Sr	Evanston, Illinois
G	22	Dick Driggs	—	—	So	Granger, Indiana
F	23	Alton Shirley	—	—	Fr	Edmond, Oklahoma
G	26	Kenneth Brown	—	—	So	Catlin, Illinois
G	27	J. Wayne Staley	—	—	So	Springfield, Illinois

Head coach

- Douglas Mills (University of Illinois) (5th year)

Assistant coach(es)

- Wally Roettger (University of Illinois) (6th year)
- Howie Braun (University of Illinois) (4th year)

Legend

- (C) Team captain
- (S) Suspended
- (I) Ineligible
- (W) Walk-on
- Injured
- Current redshirt

Roster

== Schedule ==
Date time, TV	Rank^{#}	Opponent^{#}	Result	Record	Site (attendance) city, state
Non-Conference regular season
12/6/1940*		Georgia	W 38–34	1–0	Huff Hall (4,822); Champaign, IL
12/20/1940*		Pittsburgh	L 41–43	1–1	Huff Hall (4,926); Champaign, IL
12/23/1940*		at Notre Dame	W 41–39	2–1	Notre Dame Fieldhouse (2,000); Notre Dame, IN
12/26/1940*		at Manhattan	W 56–40	3–1	Madison Square Garden (12,237); New York, NY
12/28/1940*		at Temple	L 41–42	3–2	Municipal Auditorium (7,247); Philadelphia, PA
12/31/1940*		at Marquette	W 40–32	4–2	Marquette Gymnasium (5,800); Milwaukee, WI
1/2/1941*		Kansas State	W 45-29	5–2	Huff Hall (5,829); Champaign, IL
Big Ten regular season
1/6/1941		Purdue	W 49–34	6–2 (1–0)	Huff Hall (7,183); Champaign, IL
1/11/1941		Indiana; Rivalry	L 38–48	6–3 (1–1)	Huff Hall (6,946); Champaign, IL
1/13/1941		Michigan	W 47–41	7–3 (2–1)	Huff Hall (5,619); Champaign, IL
1/18/1941		at Northwestern; Rivalry	W 42–41	8–3 (3–1)	Patten Gymnasium (2,400); Evanston, IL
1/29/1941*		Mexico	W 53–30	9-3	Huff Hall (3,910); Champaign, IL
2/3/1941		at Purdue	L 29–46	9–4 (3–2)	Lambert Fieldhouse (8,500); West Lafayette, IN
2/8/1941		Minnesota	L 38–50	9–5 (3–3)	Huff Hall (10,500); Champaign, IL
2/10/1941		at University of Chicago	W 55–29	10–5 (4–3)	Henry Crown Field House (3,500); Chicago, IL
2/15/1941		at Wisconsin	L 30-46	10–6 (4–4)	Wisconsin Field House (13,300); Madison, WI
2/17/1941		Iowa; Rivalry	W 56–53	11–6 (5–4)	Huff Hall (4,500); Champaign, IL
2/22/1941		at Michigan	L 31–47	11–7 (5–5)	Yost Fieldhouse (6,250); Ann Arbor, MI
2/24/1941		Ohio State	W 53–36	12–7 (6–5)	Huff Hall (4,480); Champaign, IL
3/1/1941		University of Chicago	W 52–33	13–7 (7–5)	Huff Hall (4,518); Champaign, IL
*Non-conference game. ^{#}Rankings from AP Poll. (#) Tournament seedings in parentheses. All times are in Central Time.

== Player stats ==
Player	Games played	Field goals	Free throws	Points
Arthur Mathisen	20	65	48	178
Robert Richmond	20	47	47	141
Walter Evers	11	49	27	125
John Drish	20	39	16	94
Victor Wukovits	20	25	30	80
Harold Shapiro	18	32	9	73
David Dillon	9	18	5	41
Henry Sachs	10	16	5	37
Alton Shirley	16	11	6	28
William Hocking	17	10	7	27
Robert O'Neill	14	5	5	15
Stanley Wayne	7	7	0	14
Dick Driggs	8	3	6	12
Keith Brown	7	1	2	4
Ralph Hooker	3	1	0	2
Richard Albaugh	9	1	0	2
Kenneth Brown	4	0	2	2

== Awards and honors ==
- Bob Richmond
  - Team Most Valuable Player
