= 1940–41 Idaho Vandals men's basketball team =

American college basketball season

1940–41 Idaho Vandals men's basketball
- Conference: Pacific Coast Conference
- Record: 14–15 (4–12 PCC)
- Head coach: Forrest Twogood (5th season)
- Assistant coach: Walter Price
- Home arena: Memorial Gymnasium

1940–41 Pacific Coast Conference men's basketball standings
	Conf.				Overall
Team	W		L	PCT	W		L	PCT
North
Washington State †	13	–	3	.813	26	–	6	.813
Oregon State	9	–	7	.563	19	–	9	.679
Oregon	7	–	9	.438	18	–	18	.500
Washington	7	–	9	.438	12	–	13	.480
Idaho	4	–	12	.250	14	–	15	.483
South
Stanford	10	–	2	.833	21	–	5	.808
California	6	–	6	.500	15	–	12	.556
USC	6	–	6	.500	15	–	10	.600
UCLA	2	–	10	.167	6	–	20	.231
† Conference playoff series winner

The 1940–41 Idaho Vandals men's basketball team represented the University of Idaho during the 1940–41 NCAA college basketball season. Members of the Pacific Coast Conference, the Vandals were led by fifth-year head coach Forrest Twogood and played their home games on campus at Memorial Gymnasium in Moscow, Idaho.

The Vandals were 14–15 overall and 4–12 in conference play.

This was Twogood's fifth and final year at Idaho; he coached baseball in the spring and then went to San Francisco for a year, served in the U.S. Navy during World War II, returned to USC in Los Angeles, and was the Trojans' head basketball coach for sixteen seasons (1950–66).

Idaho's athletic department underwent a major overhaul in March 1941 with the hiring of George Greene as athletic director, Francis Schmidt as football coach, and Guy Wicks as basketball and baseball coach.
