= 1941 SEC men's basketball tournament =

- Classification: Division I
- Teams: 12
- Site: Jefferson County Armory; Louisville, Kentucky
- Champions: Tennessee (2nd title)
- Winning coach: John Mauer (1st title)

1940–41 Southeastern Conference men's basketball standings
	Conf.				Overall
Team	W		L	PCT	W		L	PCT
Kentucky	8	–	1	.889	17	–	8	.680
Florida	6	–	2	.750	15	–	9	.625
Tennessee †	8	–	3	.727	17	–	5	.773
Alabama	11	–	7	.611	14	–	8	.636
LSU	7	–	5	.583	9	–	9	.500
Auburn	6	–	5	.545	13	–	6	.684
Tulane	6	–	5	.545	8	–	6	.571
Mississippi State	6	–	6	.500	12	–	10	.545
Georgia	6	–	7	.462	13	–	11	.542
Georgia Tech	4	–	8	.333	8	–	11	.421
Vanderbilt	3	–	9	.250	8	–	9	.471
Ole Miss	2	–	15	.118	2	–	18	.100
† Regular-season championship and SEC Tournament winner

The 1941 Southeastern Conference men's basketball tournament took place on February 27–March 1, 1941, in Louisville, Kentucky at the Jefferson County Armory. It was the eighth SEC basketball tournament.

Tennessee won the tournament by beating Kentucky in the championship game.

== Bracket ==
First Round
Tennessee	35
Mississippi State	29
Vanderbilt	63
LSU	49
Alabama	39
Georgia Tech	33
Kentucky	62
Ole Miss	52

Quarterfinals
Georgia	39
Tennessee	41
Florida	48
Vanderbilt	41
Auburn	16
Alabama	38
Tulane	30
Kentucky	59

Semifinals
Tennessee	47
Florida	26
Alabama	37
Kentucky	39

Finals
Tennessee	36
Kentucky	33
