= 1940–41 Holy Cross Crusaders men's basketball team =

American college basketball season

1940–41 Holy Cross Crusaders men's basketball
- Conference: Independent
- Record: 4–7
- Head coach: Ed Krause (2nd season)
- Captain: Vincent Hall
- Home arena: N/A

The 1940–41 Holy Cross Crusaders men's basketball team represented The College of the Holy Cross during the 1940–41 NCAA men's basketball season. The head coach was Ed Krause, coaching the crusaders in his second season.

== Schedule ==
Date time, TV	Opponent	Result	Record	Site city, state
12/17/1940*	at Brown	L 26–40	0–1	Providence, RI
1/11/1941*	at American Int'l	L 36–41	0–2	Springfield, MA
1/15/1941*	Clark	L 29–34	0–3	Worcester, MA
1/17/1941*	at Providence	L 47–58	0–4	Providence, RI
2/01/1941*	Becker	L 41–46	0–5	Worcester, MA
2/05/1941*	at Dartmouth	L 32–65	0–6	Hanover, NH
2/06/1941*	at Vermont	L 37–47	0–7	Burlington, VT
2/12/1941*	at Amherst	W 39–36	1–7	Amherst, MA
2/20/1941*	at Mass.-Lowell	W 47–33	2–7	Lowell, MA
2/22/1941*	Assumption	W 38–26	3–7	Worcester, MA
2/23/1941*	at B.C. Independents	W 35–23	4–7	
*Non-conference game. (#) Tournament seedings in parentheses.
