= 1940–41 Washington State Cougars men's basketball team =

American college basketball season

1940–41 Washington State Cougars men's basketball

NCAA tournament, Runner-up PCC Champions

National Championship Game, L 34–39 vs. Wisconsin
- Conference: Pacific Coast Conference
- Record: 26–6 (13–3 PCC)
- Head coach: Jack Friel (13th season)
- Home arena: WSC Gymnasium

1940–41 Pacific Coast Conference men's basketball standings
	Conf.				Overall
Team	W		L	PCT	W		L	PCT
North
Washington State †	13	–	3	.813	26	–	6	.813
Oregon State	9	–	7	.563	19	–	9	.679
Oregon	7	–	9	.438	18	–	18	.500
Washington	7	–	9	.438	12	–	13	.480
Idaho	4	–	12	.250	14	–	15	.483
South
Stanford	10	–	2	.833	21	–	5	.808
California	6	–	6	.500	15	–	12	.556
USC	6	–	6	.500	15	–	10	.600
UCLA	2	–	10	.167	6	–	20	.231
† Conference playoff series winner

The 1940–41 Washington State Cougars men's basketball team represented Washington State College for the 1940–41 college basketball season. Led by thirteenth-year head coach Jack Friel, the Cougars were members of the Pacific Coast Conference and played their home games on campus at WSC Gymnasium in Pullman, Washington.

The Cougars were 22–5 overall in the regular season and 13–3 in conference play, first place in Northern division. They met Southern division Stanford in a best-of-three series in Pullman for the PCC title, which the Cougars swept in two games.

Washington State advanced to the eight-team NCAA tournament in Kansas City; they defeated Creighton and Arkansas to advance to the final, but lost to Wisconsin by five points.

This remains the most successful season for Cougar men's basketball; WSU has made six NCAA tournament appearances since (1980, 1983, 1994, 2007, 2008, 2024), and the best result is the Sweet Sixteen in 2008.

== Postseason results ==
Date time, TV	Opponent	Result	Record	Site (attendance) city, state
Pacific Coast Conference Playoff Series
Fri, March 14; 8:00 pm	Stanford; Game One	W 46–43	23–5	WSC Gymnasium (5,600); Pullman, Washington
Sat, March 15; 8:00 pm	Stanford; Game Two	W 44–40	24–5	WSC Gymnasium (5,600); Pullman, Washington
NCAA tournament
Fri, March 21*; 8:30 pm	vs. Creighton; Quarterfinal	W 48–39	25–5	Municipal Auditorium; Kansas City, Missouri
Sat, March 22*; 8:30 pm	vs. Arkansas; Semifinal	W 64–53	26–5	Municipal Auditorium; Kansas City, Missouri
Sat, March 29*; 6:30 pm	vs. Wisconsin; Final	L 34–39	26–6	Municipal Auditorium; Kansas City, Missouri
*Non-conference game. (#) Tournament seedings in parentheses. All times are in Pacific time.
