= 1940–41 Michigan Wolverines men's basketball team =

American college basketball season

1940–41 Michigan Wolverines men's basketball
- Conference: Big Ten Conference
- Record: 9-10 (5-7 Big Ten)
- Head coach: Bennie Oosterbaan
- Captain: Herbert Brogan
- Home arena: Yost Field House

1940–41 Big Ten Conference men's basketball standings
	Conf.				Overall
Team	W		L	PCT	W		L	PCT
Wisconsin	11	–	1	.917	20	–	3	.870
Indiana	10	–	2	.833	17	–	3	.850
Illinois	7	–	5	.583	13	–	7	.650
Minnesota	7	–	5	.583	11	–	9	.550
Ohio State	7	–	5	.583	10	–	10	.500
Purdue	6	–	6	.500	13	–	7	.650
Michigan	5	–	7	.417	9	–	10	.474
Iowa	4	–	8	.333	12	–	8	.600
Northwestern	3	–	9	.250	7	–	11	.389
Chicago	0	–	12	.000	4	–	16	.200

The 1940–41 Michigan Wolverines men's basketball team represented the University of Michigan in intercollegiate basketball during the 1940–41 season. The team finished the season in 7th place in the Big Ten Conference with an overall record of 9–10 and 5–7 against conference opponents.

Bennie Oosterbaan was in his third year as the team's head coach. Michael Sofiak was the team's leading scorer with 192 points in 19 games for an average of 10.1 points per game. Herbert Brogan was the team captain.

== Statistical leaders ==
Player	Pos.	Yr	G	FG	FT	RB	Pts	PPG
Michael Sofiak			19	66	60		192	10.1
James Mandler			19	68	32		168	8.8
Herbert Brogan			19	41	19		101	5.3
George Ruehle			19	34	18		86	4.5
William Cartmill			18	32	10		74	4.1
Melvin Comin			9	8	11		27	3.0
Totals			19	273	171		717	37.7
