= 1940–41 Wisconsin Badgers men's basketball team =

American college basketball season

1940–41 Wisconsin Badgers men's basketball
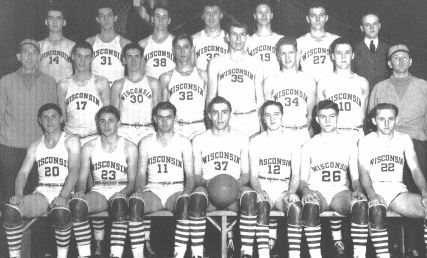

NCAA tournament National champions Big Ten regular season champions

National Championship Game, W 39–34 vs. Washington State
- Conference: Big Ten Conference
- Record: 20–3 (11–1 Big Ten)
- Head coach: Harold E. Foster
- Assistant coach: Fred Wegner
- Home arena: Wisconsin Field House

1940–41 Big Ten Conference men's basketball standings
	Conf.				Overall
Team	W		L	PCT	W		L	PCT
Wisconsin	11	–	1	.917	20	–	3	.870
Indiana	10	–	2	.833	17	–	3	.850
Illinois	7	–	5	.583	13	–	7	.650
Minnesota	7	–	5	.583	11	–	9	.550
Ohio State	7	–	5	.583	10	–	10	.500
Purdue	6	–	6	.500	13	–	7	.650
Michigan	5	–	7	.417	9	–	10	.474
Iowa	4	–	8	.333	12	–	8	.600
Northwestern	3	–	9	.250	7	–	11	.389
Chicago	0	–	12	.000	4	–	16	.200

The 1940–41 Wisconsin Badgers men's basketball team represented the University of Wisconsin. The head coach was Bud Foster, coaching his seventh season with the Badgers and were members of the Big Ten Conference. Wisconsin won their only NCAA title, defeating Washington State 39–34 in the championship game in Kansas City.

The Badgers would not return to the National Championship game until 2015, where they lost to the Duke Blue Devils by a score of 68–63.

== Schedule ==
Date time, TV	Opponent	Result	Record	Site city, state
Regular season
12/02/1940*	vs. Ripon (WI)	W 39–20	1–0	Wisconsin Rapids, WI
12/07/1940*	Marquette	W 38–32	2–0	UW Fieldhouse; Madison, WI
12/14/1940*	Notre Dame	W 44–43	3–0	UW Fieldhouse; Madison, WI
12/18/1940*	Pittsburgh	L 34–36	3–1	UW Fieldhouse; Madison, WI
12/21/1940*	at Marquette	L 30–40	3–2	Marquette Gymnasium; Milwaukee, WI
12/31/1940*	vs. Princeton	W 52–40	4–2	Marquette Gymnasium; Milwaukee, WI
1/04/1941*	at Nebraska	W 46–31	5–2	Nebraska Coliseum; Lincoln, NE
1/06/1941	at Minnesota	L 27–44	5–3 (0–1)	Minnesota Field House; Minneapolis, MN
1/11/1941	Iowa	W 49–35	6–3 (1–1)	UW Fieldhouse; Madison, WI
1/13/1941	Purdue	W 48–42 ^{OT}	7–3 (2–1)	UW Fieldhouse; Madison, WI
1/18/1941	at Michigan	W 40–30	8–3 (3–1)	Yost Field House; Ann Arbor, MI
1/20/1941	at Chicago	W 44–37	9–3 (4–1)	Henry Crown Field House; Chicago, IL
1/25/1941	Ohio State	W 46–31	10–3 (5–1)	UW Fieldhouse; Madison, WI
2/08/1941*	Butler	W 59–55	11–3	UW Fieldhouse; Madison, WI
2/10/1941	at Northwestern	W 48–46 ^{OT}	12–3 (6–1)	Patten Gymnasium; Evanston, IL
2/15/1941	Illinois	W 46–30	13–3 (7–1)	UW Fieldhouse; Madison, WI
2/17/1941	at Purdue	W 43–42	14–3 (8–1)	Lambert Fieldhouse; West Lafayette, IN
2/22/1941	Chicago	W 65–25	15–3 (9–1)	UW Fieldhouse; Madison, WI
2/24/1941	at Indiana	W 38–30	16–3 (10–1)	IU Fieldhouse; Bloomington, IN
3/01/1941	Minnesota	W 42–32	17–3 (11–1)	UW Fieldhouse; Madison, WI
NCAA tournament
3/21/1941*	Dartmouth; Quarterfinal	W 51–50	18–3	UW Fieldhouse; Madison, WI
3/22/1941*	Pittsburgh; Semifinal	W 36–30	19–3	UW Fieldhouse; Madison, WI
3/29/1941*	vs. Washington State; Final	W 39–34	20–3	Municipal Auditorium; Kansas City, MO
*Non-conference game. ^{#}Rankings from AP Poll. (#) Tournament seedings in parentheses.

== Awards and honors ==
- Gene Englund, Consensus first team All-American
- John Kotz, NCAA basketball tournament Most Outstanding Player
