= Harold E. Foster =

American basketball player and coach

Biographical details
- Born: May 30, 1906; Newton, Kansas, U.S.
- Died: June 16, 1996 (aged 90)

Playing career
- 1926–1930: Wisconsin

Coaching career (HC unless noted)
- 1934–1959: Wisconsin

Head coaching record
- Overall: 265–267
- Tournaments: 4–1 (NCAA)

Accomplishments and honors

Championships
- NCAA (1941); 3 Big Ten (1935, 1941, 1947)
- Basketball Hall of Fame; Inducted in 1964 (profile)
- College Basketball Hall of Fame; Inducted in 2006

Harold E. "Bud" Foster, (May 30, 1906 – July 16, 1996) was an American basketball player and coach. He is a member of the Naismith Memorial Basketball Hall of Fame. Foster prepped at Mason City, Iowa and went on to play at the University of Wisconsin–Madison from 1926 to 1930. While a player at Wisconsin, he was voted twice All Big Ten Conference and helped lead Wisconsin to a 43–8 three year record. He was born in Newton, Kansas.

After college, Foster played professionally with the Oshkosh All-Stars. He teamed up with fellow Big Ten star (and also a future Hall of Famer) Branch McCracken to lead the All-Stars to a 30–23 victory over the Chicago Majestic and the Midwest professional championship. He went on to play with pro teams in Milwaukee and Chicago.

After his playing career, Foster was named freshman coach of basketball at Wisconsin in 1933. He succeeded Doc Meanwell as head coach a year later, and remained as head coach until 1959. His Wisconsin team won the 1941 NCAA championship.

Foster served as president of the National Association of Basketball Coaches and was a member of the Basketball Rules Committee from 1957 to 1966.

Foster's 266 wins remained the most in Wisconsin history until Bo Ryan passed him in 2012; his 267 losses remain a school record.

After coaching the Wisconsin Badgers, Foster broadcast the Badger Basketball games, sharing the booth with Ted Moore.

== Awards ==
In addition to his induction in the National Basketball Hall of Fame (1964), Foster is a member of the University of Wisconsin Athletics Hall of Fame (1991) as well as the State of Wisconsin Athletic Hall of Fame (1970), Madison Sports Hall of Fame (1966) and Helms Athletic Foundation Hall of Fame.

== Head coaching record ==
Record table
Season	Team	Overall	Conference	Standing	Postseason
Wisconsin Badgers (Big Ten Conference) (1934–1959)
1934–35	Wisconsin	15–5	9–3	T–1st	
1935–36	Wisconsin	11–9	4–8	8th	
1936–37	Wisconsin	8–12	3–9	T–8th	
1937–38	Wisconsin	10–10	5–7	7th	
1938–39	Wisconsin	10–10	4–8	T–7th	
1939–40	Wisconsin	5–15	3–9	9th	
1940–41	Wisconsin	20–3	11–1	1st	NCAA Champion
1941–42	Wisconsin	14–7	10–5	T–2nd	
1942–43	Wisconsin	12–9	6–6	T–4th	
1943–44	Wisconsin	12–9	9–3	T–2nd	
1944–45	Wisconsin	10–11	4–8	T–6th	
1945–46	Wisconsin	4–17	1–11	9th	
1946–47	Wisconsin	16–6	9–3	1st	NCAA Quarterfinal
1947–48	Wisconsin	12–8	7–5	T–3rd	
1948–49	Wisconsin	12–10	5–7	7th	
1949–50	Wisconsin	17–5	9–3	2nd	
1950–51	Wisconsin	10–12	7–7	T–4th	
1951–52	Wisconsin	10–12	5–9	7th	
1952–53	Wisconsin	13–9	10–8	5th	
1953–54	Wisconsin	12–10	6–8	T–5th	
1954–55	Wisconsin	10–12	5–9	T–6th	
1955–56	Wisconsin	6–16	4–10	T–8th	
1956–57	Wisconsin	5–17	3–11	9th	
1957–58	Wisconsin	8–14	3–11	10th	
1958–59	Wisconsin	3–19	1–13	10th	
Wisconsin:		265–267	143–182		
Total:		265–267			
National champion Postseason invitational champion Conference regular season champion Conference regular season and conference tournament champion Division regular season champion Division regular season and conference tournament champion Conference tournament champion

== See also ==
- List of NCAA Division I Men's Final Four appearances by coach
