= 1940–41 Arkansas Razorbacks men's basketball team =

American college basketball season

1940–41 Arkansas Razorbacks men's basketball

Southwest Conference Champions

NCAA tournament, Final Four
- Conference: Southwest Conference
- Record: 20–3 (12–0 SWC)
- Head coach: Glen Rose (8th season)
- Home arena: Men's Gymnasium

1940–41 Southwest Conference men's basketball standings
	Conf.				Overall
Team	W		L	PCT	W		L	PCT
Arkansas	12	–	0	1.000	20	–	3	.870
Rice	8	–	4	.667	18	–	6	.750
Texas	7	–	5	.583	14	–	10	.583
SMU	6	–	6	.500	10	–	10	.500
Baylor	6	–	6	.500	10	–	12	.455
Texas A&M	3	–	9	.250	7	–	13	.350
TCU	0	–	12	.000	5	–	16	.238

The 1940–41 Arkansas Razorbacks men's basketball team represented the University of Arkansas in the 1940–41 college basketball season. The Razorbacks played their home games in the Men's Gymnasium in Fayetteville, Arkansas. It was former Razorback All-American Glen Rose's eighth season as head coach of the Hogs. Arkansas won the Southwest Conference championship for the ninth time overall and first time since the 1937–38 season, finishing with a perfect 12–0 record in conference play and 20–3 overall. It was Arkansas's second perfect conference season (along with 1927–28) and its last until 1976–77. The Razorbacks did not lose a game against collegiate competition during the regular season, but lost two out of three games away from Fayetteville against the Amateur Athletic Union powerhouse Phillips 66ers. Arkansas was invited to the NCAA tournament for the first time (narrowly missing out on the inaugural tournament in 1939, with rival Texas winning the SWC by one game and gaining the league's bid to the tournament) and won its first ever NCAA Tournament game against Wyoming, 52–40. The Razorbacks advanced to their first ever Final Four, where they fell to eventual national runner-up, Washington State.

Multiple Razorbacks had outstanding seasons, with Johnny Adams, Howard Hickey, and John Freiberger all garnering First Team All-SWC honors. Adams, a pioneer of the jump shot, was also recognized as a First Team All-American by Helms. Adams set the SWC scoring record during the February 21 game against TCU with 36 points. Gordon Carpenter and R.C. Pitts would go on to be Olympic gold medalists in basketball during the 1948 Summer Olympics.

== Roster ==
1940–41 Arkansas Razorbacks men's basketball roster
Roster retrieved from HogStats.com.
Name	Number	Position	Height	Hometown
Johnny Adams	41	Forward	6'3"	Beebe, Arkansas
O'Neal Adams	71	Guard/Forward	6'3"	Beebe, Arkansas
Gordon Carpenter	75	Center	6'8"	Ash Flat, Arkansas
John Freiburger	37	Center	6'8"	Point, Texas
Howard Hickey	35	Forward	6'2"	Clarksville, Arkansas
Robert Honea	56	N/A	N/A	N/A
Ken McCormick	37	Forward	N/A	Prairie Grove, Arkansas
A.E. Mitchell	35	Forward	N/A	N/A
R.C. Pitts	74	Forward	6'5"	Pontotoc, Mississippi
Billy Reyenga	34	Guard	N/A	Emmet, Arkansas
Noble Robbins	76	N/A	N/A	Ash Flat, Arkansas
Clayton Wynne	70	Guard	N/A	West Memphis, Arkansas

== Schedule and results ==
Schedule retrieved from HogStats.com.

Date time, TV	Rank^{#}	Opponent^{#}	Result	Record	Site city, state
Regular season
December 13, 1940*		Drury	W 62–17	1–0	Men's Gymnasium; Fayetteville, Arkansas
December 14, 1940*		Drury	W 46–20	2–0	Men's Gymnasium; Fayetteville, Arkansas
December 19, 1940*		at Murray State	W 52–30	3–0	Lovett Auditorium; Murray, Kentucky
December 20, 1940*		vs. Southwestern Presbyterian	W 58–35	4–0	Marion, Arkansas
December 21, 1940*		vs. Phillips 66ers	W 38–24	5–0	Little Rock, Arkansas
January 3, 1941*		at Phillips 66ers	L 33–35	5–1	Bartlesville High School; Bartlesville, Oklahoma
January 4, 1941*		at Kansas State Teachers College of Pittsburg	W 48–45	6–1	Pittsburg, Kansas
January 10, 1941		at Texas	W 50–38	7–1 (1–0)	Gregory Gymnasium; Austin, Texas
January 11, 1941		at Texas	W 44–34	8–1 (2–0)	Gregory Gymnasium; Austin, Texas
January 17, 1941		at Texas A&M	W 68–33	9–1 (3–0)	Men's Gymnasium; Fayetteville, Arkansas
January 18, 1941		at Texas A&M	W 58–36	10–1 (4–0)	Men's Gymnasium; Fayetteville, Arkansas
February 1, 1941*		at Kansas State Teachers College of Pittsburg	W 71–45	11–1 (4–0)	Men's Gymnasium; Fayetteville, Arkansas
February 7, 1941		at Baylor	W 62–48	12–1 (5–0)	Men's Gymnasium; Fayetteville, Arkansas
February 8, 1941		at Baylor	W 36–31	13–1 (6–0)	Men's Gymnasium; Fayetteville, Arkansas
February 12, 1941		at Rice	W 66–41	14–1 (7–0)	Men's Gymnasium; Fayetteville, Arkansas
February 13, 1941		at Rice	W 48–43	15–1 (8–0)	Men's Gymnasium; Fayetteville, Arkansas
February 18, 1941*		vs. Phillips 66ers	L 26–31	15–2 (8–0)	Tulsa, Oklahoma
February 21, 1941		at TCU	W 67–42	16–2 (9–0)	TCU Fieldhouse; Fort Worth, Texas
February 22, 1941		at TCU	W 66–43	17–2 (10–0)	TCU Fieldhouse; Fort Worth, Texas
February 28, 1941		at SMU	W 40–23	18–2 (11–0)	Old Gym; Dallas, Texas
March 1, 1941		at SMU	W 40–32	19–2 (12–0)	Old Gym; Dallas, Texas
NCAA Tournament
March 21, 1941*		vs. Wyoming; Elite Eight	W 52–40	20–2 (12–0)	Municipal Auditorium; Kansas City, Missouri
March 22, 1941*		vs. Washington State; Final Four	L 53–64	20–3 (12–0)	Municipal Auditorium; Kansas City, Missouri
*Non-conference game. ^{#}Rankings from AP Poll. (#) Tournament seedings in parentheses. All times are in Central Time.
