= 1940–41 Indiana Hoosiers men's basketball team =

American college basketball season

1940–41 Indiana Hoosiers men's basketball
- Conference: Big Ten Conference
- Record: 17–3 (10–2 Big Ten)
- Head coach: Branch McCracken (3rd season)
- Home arena: The Fieldhouse

1940–41 Big Ten Conference men's basketball standings
	Conf.				Overall
Team	W		L	PCT	W		L	PCT
Wisconsin	11	–	1	.917	20	–	3	.870
Indiana	10	–	2	.833	17	–	3	.850
Illinois	7	–	5	.583	13	–	7	.650
Minnesota	7	–	5	.583	11	–	9	.550
Ohio State	7	–	5	.583	10	–	10	.500
Purdue	6	–	6	.500	13	–	7	.650
Michigan	5	–	7	.417	9	–	10	.474
Iowa	4	–	8	.333	12	–	8	.600
Northwestern	3	–	9	.250	7	–	11	.389
Chicago	0	–	12	.000	4	–	16	.200

The 1940–41 Indiana Hoosiers men's basketball team represented Indiana University. Their head coach was Branch McCracken, who was in his 3rd year. The team played its home games in The Fieldhouse in Bloomington, Indiana, and was a member of the Big Ten Conference.

Coming off the program's first national championship, the Hoosiers finished the regular season with an overall record of 17–3 and a conference record of 10–2, finishing 2nd in the Big Ten Conference. Indiana was not invited to participate in any postseason tournament.

== Roster ==
No.	Name	Position	Ht.	Year	Hometown
7	John Logan	F	6–1	So.	Richmond, Indiana
8	Bill Frey	F	6–1	Jr.	Kokomo, Indiana
9	Chet Francis	G	6–1	Sr.	Avon, Indiana
11	William Torphy	G	6–1	Jr.	Bedford, Indiana
12	Jim Gridley	G	6–1	Sr.	Vevay, Indiana
14	Irv Swanson	G	5–10	So.	LaPorte, Indiana
18	Ed Denton	C	6–2	So.	Jeffersonville, Indiana
21	Max Hasler	G	5–10	Jr.	Elnora, Indiana
22	Jay McCreary	G	5–10	Sr.	Frankfort, Indiana
24	Cliff Forsyth	G	6–2	So.	Terre Haute, Indiana
26	Tom Motter	F	6–1	Sr.	Fort Wayne, Indiana
27	Hal Driver	C	6–3	So.	Aurora, Indiana
29	Robert Menke	F	6–3	Sr.	Huntingburg, Indiana
30	Herm Schaefer	F	6–1	Sr.	Fort Wayne, Indiana
35	William Menke	C	6–3	Sr.	Huntingburg, Indiana
36	Anthony Scheidler	F	6–1	So.	Muncie, Indiana
40	Curly Armstrong	F	5–11	Sr.	Fort Wayne, Indiana
41	Andy Zimmer	C/G	6–4	Jr.	Goodland, Indiana
42	Everett Hoffman	C	6–3	Jr.	Evansville, Indiana
43	Bob Dro	G	5–11	Sr.	Berne, Indiana
N/A	Ordine Heine	C	6–2	So.	New Haven, Indiana
N/A	Guy Wellman	G	5–10	So.	Valparaiso, Indiana
N/A	Cliff Wiethoff	F	6–1	Jr.	Seymour, Indiana
N/A	Robert White	G	6–1	So.	Joliet, Illinois

== Schedule/results ==
Date time, TV	Rank^{#}	Opponent^{#}	Result	Record	Site city, state
Regular season
12/7/1940*		Georgia	W 44–31	1–0	The Fieldhouse; Bloomington, Indiana
12/12/1940*		at Butler	W 39–36	2–0	Butler Fieldhouse; Indianapolis
12/14/1940*		Marshall	W 53–22	3–0	The Field House; Bloomington, Indiana
12/21/1940*		at Stanford	W 60–59	4–0	Stanford Pavilion; Stanford, California
12/23/1940*		at California	W 42–39	5–0	Haas Pavilion; Berkeley, California
12/27/1940*		at USC	L 39–41	5–1	Shrine Auditorium; Los Angeles
12/28/1940*		at UCLA	W 51–26	6–1	Men's Gym; Los Angeles
12/30/1940*		vs. Kentucky; Indiana–Kentucky rivalry	W 48–45	7–1	Municipal Auditorium; New Orleans
1/11/1941		at Illinois; Rivalry	W 48–38	8–1 (1–0)	Huff Hall; Champaign, Illinois
1/13/1941		Northwestern	W 52–32	9–1 (2–0)	The Fieldhouse; Bloomington, Indiana
1/27/1941		at Michigan	W 41–40	10–1 (3–0)	Yost Field House; Ann Arbor, Michigan
2/1/1941		at Purdue; Rivalry	L 36–40	10–2 (3–1)	Lambert Fieldhouse; West Lafayette, Indiana
2/3/1941		Ohio State	W 45–25	11–2 (4–1)	The Fieldhouse; Bloomington, Indiana
2/10/1941		Iowa	W 50–40	12–2 (5–1)	The Fieldhouse; Bloomington, Indiana
2/15/1941		Minnesota	W 44–34	13–2 (6–1)	The Fieldhouse; Bloomington, Indiana
2/17/1941		at Ohio State	W 40–33	14–2 (7–1)	Ohio Expo Center Coliseum; Columbus, Ohio
2/22/1941		at Iowa	W 47–36	15–2 (8–1)	Iowa Field House; Iowa City, IA
2/24/1941		Wisconsin	L 30–38	15–3 (8–2)	The Fieldhouse; Bloomington, Indiana
3/1/1941		Purdue; Rivalry	W 47–29	16–3 (9–2)	The Fieldhouse; Bloomington, Indiana
3/3/1941		at Chicago	W 49–33	17–3 (10–2)	Henry Crown Field House; Chicago
*Non-conference game. ^{#}Rankings from AP Poll. (#) Tournament seedings in parentheses.
