= John Kotz (basketball) =

American basketball player (1919 - 1999)

Personal information
- Born: March 27, 1919 Rhinelander, Wisconsin, U.S.
- Died: May 8, 1999 (aged 80) Elk Grove Village, Illinois, U.S.
- Listed height: 6 ft 1 in (1.85 m)

Career information
- High school: Rhinelander (Rhinelander, Wisconsin)
- College: Wisconsin (1940–1943)
- Position: Forward

Career history
- 1945–1946: Sheboygan Red Skins

Career highlights
- NCAA champion (1941); NCAA final Four Most Outstanding Player (1941); Consensus first-team All-American (1942); Consensus second-team All-American (1943)

John P. Kotz (March 27, 1919 – May 8, 1999) was an American college basketball player and early professional, best known as the Most Outstanding Player of the 1941 NCAA tournament as a member of the Wisconsin Badgers.

== Collegiate career ==
Kotz, a 6'3 forward from Rhinelander, Wisconsin, played collegiately at the University of Wisconsin from 1940 to 1943. As a sophomore, Kotz led the Badgers to the 1941 NCAA Championship and was named the tournament's Most Outstanding Player. He was an All-American in 1942 and 1943. Kotz left Wisconsin as the school's leading scorer.

He was inducted into the University of Wisconsin Athletics Hall of Fame in 1991.

== Professional career ==
After his standout career, he played professionally for the Sheboygan Red Skins of the National Basketball League in the 1945–46 season.
