= 1941 NCAA basketball tournament =

Edition of USA college basketball tournament

- Teams: 8
- Finals site: Municipal Auditorium, Kansas City, Missouri
- Champions: Wisconsin Badgers (1st title, 1st title game, 1st Final Four)
- Runner-up: Washington State Cougars (1st title game, 1st Final Four)
- Semifinalists: Arkansas Razorbacks (1st Final Four); Pittsburgh Panthers (1st Final Four)
- Winning coach: Bud Foster (1st title)
- MOP: John Kotz (Wisconsin)
- Attendance: 48,055
- Top scorer: John Adams (Arkansas) (48 points)

The 1941 NCAA basketball tournament involved eight schools playing in single-elimination play to determine the national champion of men's NCAA college basketball. The 3rd annual edition of the tournament began on March 21, 1941, and ended with the championship game on March 29, at the Municipal Auditorium in Kansas City, Missouri. A total of nine games were played, including a third place game in both regions.

Wisconsin, coached by Bud Foster, won the national title with a 39–34 victory in the final over Washington State, coached by Jack Friel. John Kotz of Wisconsin was named the tournament's Most Outstanding Player.

== Locations ==
The following are the sites selected to host each round of the 1941 tournament:

=== Regionals ===
March 21 and 22
East Regional, Wisconsin Field House, Madison, Wisconsin (Host: University of Wisconsin-Madison)
West Regional, Municipal Auditorium, Kansas City, Missouri (Host: Missouri Valley Conference)

=== Championship Game ===
March 29
Municipal Auditorium, Kansas City, Missouri (Host: Missouri Valley Conference)

== Teams ==
East Regional - Madison
School	Coach	Conference	Record
Dartmouth	Osborne Cowles	EIBL	18–4
North Carolina	Bill Lange	Southern	19–7
Pittsburgh	Doc Carlson	Independent	12–5
Wisconsin	Bud Foster	Big Ten	17–3

West Regional - Kansas City
School	Coach	Conference	Record
Arkansas	Glen Rose	Southwest	19–2
Creighton	Eddie Hickey	Missouri Valley	17–6
Washington State	Jack Friel	Pacific Coast	24–5
Wyoming	Everett Shelton	Mountain States	14–4

== Bracket ==
Regional Semifinals; March 21
Wisconsin	51
Dartmouth	50
East – Madison
Pittsburgh	26
North Carolina	20
Arkansas	52
Wyoming	40
West – Kansas City
Washington State	48
Creighton	39
East Third Place Game; March 22
Dartmouth	60
North Carolina	59

Regional Finals; March 22
Wisconsin	36
Pittsburgh	30
Arkansas	53
Washington State	64
West Third Place Game; March 22
Wyoming	44
Creighton	45

National Championship; March 29
Kansas City
Wisconsin	39
Washington State	34

== See also ==
- 1941 National Invitation Tournament
- 1941 NAIA Basketball Tournament
