= List of Stanford Cardinal men's basketball seasons =

This is a list of seasons completed by the Stanford Cardinal men's college basketball team.

== Seasons ==
Statistics overview
Season	Coach	Overall	Conference	Standing	Postseason
H. W. Maloney (Independent) (1913–1915)
1913–14	H. W. Maloney	7–5	—	—	—
1914–15	H. W. Maloney	4–5	—	—	—
Maloney:		11–10			
E. C. "Squire" Behrens (Independent) (1915–1916)
1915–16	E. C. "Squire" Behrens	2–9	—	—	
Behrens:		2–9			
Russell Wilson (PCC/Cal–Nevada) (1916–1918)
1916–17	Russell Wilson	8–8	0–6	5th	
1917–18	Russell Wilson	11–4	—	3rd	
Wilson:		19–12			
Bob Evans (PCC) (1918–1920)
1918–19	Bob Evans	9–3	0–2	6th	
1919–20	Bob Evans	12–3	8–1	1st	
Evans:		21–6			
Walter D. Powell (PCC) (1920–1921)
1920–21	Walter D. Powell	15–3	8–3	T–1st	
Powell:		15–3			
C. E. Van Gent (PCC) (1921–1922)
1921–22	C. E. Van Gent	8–7	4–6	5th	
Van Gent:		8–7			
Andy Kerr (PCC) (1922–1926)
1922–23	Andy Kerr	12–4	5–3	T–1st (South)	
1923–24	Andy Kerr	10–5	3–5	3rd (South)	
1924–25	Andy Kerr	10–3	1–3	2nd (South)	
1925–26	Andy Kerr	10–6	3–2	2nd (South)	
Kerr:		42–18			
E. P. "Husky" Hunt (PCC) (1926–1930)
1926–27	E. P. "Husky" Hunt	9–9	3–2	2nd (South)	
1927–28	E. P. "Husky" Hunt	8–13	1–8	4th (South)	
1928–29	E. P. "Husky" Hunt	13–6	6–3	2nd (South)	
1929–30	E. P. "Husky" Hunt	10–9	2–7	4th (South)	
Hunt:		40–37			
John Bunn (PCC) (1930–1938)
1930–31	John Bunn	8–9	3–6	4th (South)	
1931–32	John Bunn	6–14	2–9	4th (South)	
1932–33	John Bunn	9–18	3–8	3rd (South)	
1933–34	John Bunn	8–12	5–7	3rd (South)	
1934–35	John Bunn	10–17	4–8	T–3rd (South)	
1935–36	John Bunn	21–8	7–5	T–1st (South)	
1936–37	John Bunn	25–2	10–2	T–1st (South)	Helms National Champion
1937–38	John Bunn	21–3	10–2	1st (South)	
Bunn:		108–83			
Everett Dean (PCC) (1938–1951)
1938–39	Everett Dean	16–9	6–6	3rd (South)	
1939–40	Everett Dean	14–9	6–6	2nd (South)	
1940–41	Everett Dean	21–5	10–2	1st (South)	
1941–42	Everett Dean	28–4	11–1	1st (South)	NCAA Champion
1942–43	Everett Dean	10–11	4–4	T–2nd (South)	
1943–44	No team (WWII)				
1944–45	No team (WWII)				
1945–46	Everett Dean	6–18	0–12	4th (South)	
1946–47	Everett Dean	15–16	5–7	3rd (South)	
1947–48	Everett Dean	15–11	3–9	T–3rd (South)	
1948–49	Everett Dean	19–9	5–7	3rd (South)	
1949–50	Everett Dean	11–14	3–9	4th (South)	
1950–51	Everett Dean	12–14	5–7	3rd (South)	
Dean:		167–120			
Robert W. Burnett (PCC) (1951–1954)
1951–52	Robert W. Burnett	19–9	6–6	T–2nd (South)	
1952–53	Robert W. Burnett	6–17	2–10	4th (South)	
1953–54	Robert W. Burnett	13–10	3–9	4th (South)	
Burnett:		38–36			
Howard Dallmar (PCC/AAWU/Pac-8) (1954–1975)
1954–55	Howard Dallmar	16–8	7–5	2nd (South)	
1955–56	Howard Dallmar	18–6	10–6	3rd	
1956–57	Howard Dallmar	11–15	7–9	5th	
1957–58	Howard Dallmar	12–13	7–9	6th	
1958–59	Howard Dallmar	15–9	10–6	T–3rd	
1959–60	Howard Dallmar	11–14	4–7	4th	
1960–61	Howard Dallmar	7–17	3–9	5th	
1961–62	Howard Dallmar	16–6	8–4	2nd	
1962–63	Howard Dallmar	16–9	7–5	T–1st	
1963–64	Howard Dallmar	15–10	9–6	2nd	
1964–65	Howard Dallmar	15–8	9–5	2nd	
1965–66	Howard Dallmar	13–12	8–6	3rd	
1966–67	Howard Dallmar	15–11	7–7	4th	
1967–68	Howard Dallmar	10–15	5–9	T–5th	
1968–69	Howard Dallmar	8–17	4–10	T–7th	
1969–70	Howard Dallmar	5–20	2–12	8th	
1970–71	Howard Dallmar	6–20	2–12	8th	
1971–72	Howard Dallmar	10–15	5–9	6th	
1972–73	Howard Dallmar	14–11	7–7	4th	
1973–74	Howard Dallmar	11–14	5–9	6th	
1974–75	Howard Dallmar	12–14	6–8	T–5th	
Dallmar:		256–264			
Dick DiBiaso (Pac-8/Pac-10) (1975–1982)
1975–76	Dick DiBiaso	11–16	5–9	7th	
1976–77	Dick DiBiaso	11–16	3–11	7th	
1977–78	Dick DiBiaso	13–14	3–11	10th	
1978–79	Dick DiBiaso	12–15	6–12	8th	
1979–80	Dick DiBiaso	7–19	5–13	7th	
1980–81	Dick DiBiaso	9–18	5–13	T–8th	
1981–82	Dick DiBiaso	7–20	2–16	10th	
DiBiaso:		70–118			
Tom Davis (Pac-10) (1982–1986)
1982–83	Tom Davis	14–14	6–12	8th	
1983–84	Tom Davis	19–12	8–10	5th	
1984–85	Tom Davis	11–17	3–15	10th	
1985–86	Tom Davis	14–16	8–10	T–5th	
Davis:		58–59			
Mike Montgomery (Pac-10) (1986–2004)
1986–87	Mike Montgomery	15–13	9–9	6th	
1987–88	Mike Montgomery	21–12	11–7	4th	NIT Second Round
1988–89	Mike Montgomery	26–7	15–3	2nd	NCAA Division I First Round
1989–90	Mike Montgomery	18–12	9–9	6th	NIT First Round
1990–91	Mike Montgomery	20–13	8–10	5th	NIT Champion
1991–92	Mike Montgomery	18–11	10–8	4th	NCAA Division I First Round
1992–93	Mike Montgomery	7–23	2–16	10th	
1993–94	Mike Montgomery	17–11	10–8	5th	NIT First Round
1994–95	Mike Montgomery	20–9	10–8	5th	NCAA Division I Second Round
1995–96	Mike Montgomery	21–8	12–6	3rd	NCAA Division I Second Round
1996–97	Mike Montgomery	22–8	12–6	T–2nd	NCAA Division I Sweet Sixteen
1997–98	Mike Montgomery	30–5	15–3	2nd	NCAA Division I Final Four
1998–99	Mike Montgomery	26–7	15–3	1st	NCAA Division I Second Round
1999–00	Mike Montgomery	27–4	15–3	T–1st	NCAA Division I Second Round
2000–01	Mike Montgomery	31–3	16–2	1st	NCAA Division I Elite Eight
2001–02	Mike Montgomery	20–10	12–6	T–2nd	NCAA Division I Second Round
2002–03	Mike Montgomery	24–9	14–4	2nd	NCAA Division I Second Round
2003–04	Mike Montgomery	30–2	17–1	1st	NCAA Division I Second Round
Montgomery:		393–167			
Trent Johnson (Pac-10) (2004–2008)
2004–05	Trent Johnson	18–13	11–7	3rd	NCAA Division I First Round
2005–06	Trent Johnson	16–14	11–7	T–4th	NIT Second Round
2006–07	Trent Johnson	18–13	10–8	6th	NCAA Division I First Round
2007–08	Trent Johnson	28–8	13–5	2nd	NCAA Division I Sweet Sixteen
Johnson:		80–48			
Johnny Dawkins (Pac-10/Pac-12) (2008–2016)
2008–09	Johnny Dawkins	20–14	6–12	9th	CBI Semifinal
2009–10	Johnny Dawkins	14–18	7–11	T–8th	
2010–11	Johnny Dawkins	15–16	7–11	T–7th	
2011–12	Johnny Dawkins	26–11	10–8	7th	NIT Champion
2012–13	Johnny Dawkins	19–15	9–9	T–6th	NIT Second Round
2013–14	Johnny Dawkins	23–13	10–8	T–3rd	NCAA Division I Sweet Sixteen
2014–15	Johnny Dawkins	24–13	9–9	T–5th	NIT Champion
2015–16	Johnny Dawkins	15–15	8–10	9th	
Dawkins:		156–115			
Jerod Haase (Pac-12) (2016–2024)
2016–17	Jerod Haase	14–17	6–12	9th	
2017–18	Jerod Haase	19−16	11–7	T–3rd	NIT Second Round
2018–19	Jerod Haase	15−16	8–10	T–8th	
2019–20	Jerod Haase	20−12	9–9	7th	Cancelled due to the COVID-19 pandemic
2020–21	Jerod Haase	14−13	10–10	T–6th	
2021–22	Jerod Haase	16−16	8–12	9th	
2022–23	Jerod Haase	14−19	7–13	10th	
2023–24	Jerod Haase	14−19	8–12	T-9th	
Haase:		126–127			
Atlantic Coast Conference
Kyle Smith (Atlantic Coast Conference) (2024–present)
2024–25	Kyle Smith	21−14	11–9	7th	NIT Second Round
2025–26	Kyle Smith	20–13	9–9	T–9th	CBC Quarterfinals
Smith:		41–27 (.603)			
Total:		1,654–1,260 (.568)			
National champion Postseason invitational champion Conference regular season champion Conference regular season and conference tournament champion Division regular season champion Division regular season and conference tournament champion Conference tournament champion
