= Fred Linari =

American former basketball player

Personal information
- Born: July 21, 1920
- Died: November 1, 2012 (aged 92)
- Listed height: 5 ft 9 in (1.75 m)

Career information
- High school: San Francisco Poly (San Francisco, California)
- College: Stanford (1941–1943)
- Position: Forward

Career highlights
- NCAA champion (1942)

Frederick J. Linari (21 July 1920 - 2 November 2012) is an American former basketball player.

== Basketball career ==
A forward from San Francisco Polytechnic High School, Linari played collegiately for Stanford University. He was a reserve on Stanford's 1942 national championship team. In the championship game, Linari was pressed into action in the game after starting forward Don Burness was unable to continue due to an ankle injury incurred earlier in the tournament. At just 5 feet 9 inches (1.75 m), Linari nonetheless filled in ably for the 6-foot-3-inch (1.91 m) Burness, playing 31 of 40 game minutes and scoring six points to help the Indians win the championship.

== After college ==
After graduating from Stanford, Linari became a pilot for Pan Am and moved to Honolulu.
