= List of NCAA Division I men's basketball champions =

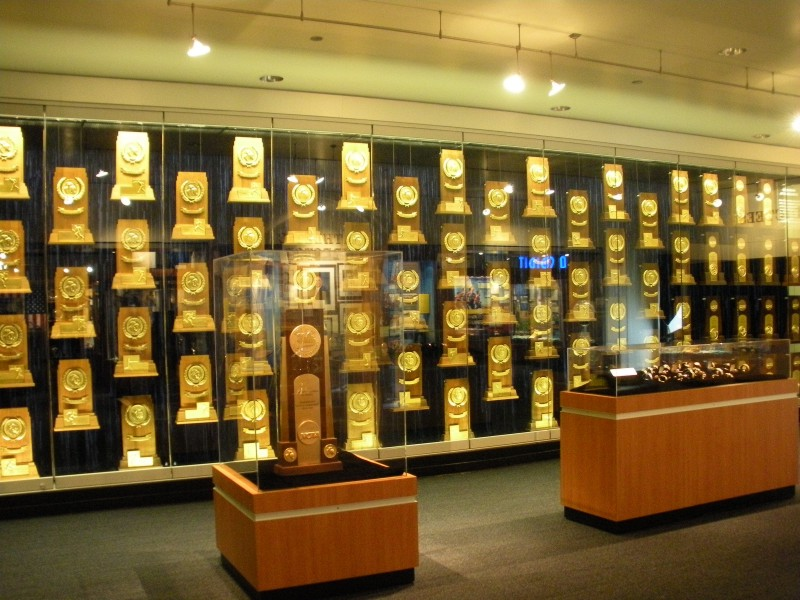
The University of California, Los Angeles (trophy room pictured) has won the NCAA Division I men's basketball championship a record 11 times.

The NCAA Division I men's basketball tournament is a single-elimination tournament for men's college basketball teams in the United States. It determines the champion of Division I, the top level of play in the National Collegiate Athletic Association (NCAA), and the media often describes the winner as the national champion of college basketball. The NCAA tournament has been held annually since 1939, except for 2020, when it was canceled because of the COVID-19 pandemic in the U.S. Its field grew from eight teams in the beginning to sixty-five teams by 2001; as of 2011, sixty-eight teams take part in the tournament. Teams can gain invitations by winning a conference championship or receiving an at-large bid from a 10-person committee. The semifinals of the tournament are known as the Final Four and are held in a different city each year, along with the championship game; Indianapolis, the city where the NCAA is based, will host the Final Four every five years until 2040. Each winning university receives a rectangular, gold-plated trophy made of wood.

The first NCAA tournament was organized by the National Association of Basketball Coaches. Oregon won the inaugural tournament, defeating Ohio State 46–33 in the first championship game. Before the 1941 tournament, control of the event was given to the NCAA. In the early years of the tournament, it was considered less important than the National Invitation Tournament (NIT), a New York City-based event. Teams were able to compete in both events in the same year, and three of those that did so—Utah in 1944, Kentucky in 1949, and City College of New York (CCNY) in 1950—won the NCAA Tournament. The 1949–50 CCNY team won both tournaments (defeating Bradley in both finals), and is the only college basketball team to accomplish this feat. By the mid-1950s, the NCAA tournament became the more prestigious of the two events, and in 1971 the NCAA barred universities from playing in other tournaments, such as the NIT, if they were invited to the NCAA tournament. Only twice has there been no national champion in a calendar year. The first occurrence was when the 2013 championship won by Louisville became the first men's basketball national title to ever be vacated by the NCAA after the school and its coach at the time, Rick Pitino, were implicated in a 2015 sex scandal involving recruits. A situation in which no official winner was declared did not happen again until the 2020 cancellation.

The University of California, Los Angeles (UCLA) has been the most successful college in the NCAA tournament, winning 11 national titles. Ten of those championships came during a 12-year stretch from 1964 to 1975. UCLA also holds the record for the most consecutive championships, winning seven in a row from 1967 to 1973. Kentucky has the second-most titles, with eight. North Carolina and Connecticut are tied for third with six championships each, while Duke and Indiana follow with five each. Michigan is the most recent champion, defeating UConn in the 2026 national championship game. Among head coaches, John Wooden is the all-time leader with 10 championships; he coached UCLA during their period of success in the 1960s and 1970s. Duke's Mike Krzyzewski is second all-time with five titles.

== National championship games ==
Legend
Indicator	Meaning
Italics*	Championship game appearance vacated by the NCAA
Score	Each score is linked to an article about that particular championship game
Year	Each year is linked to an article about that particular NCAA Tournament

NCAA Division I men's basketball national championship games
Year	Champion	Winning head coach	Score	Runner-up	Losing head coach	Venue	City	Ref.
1939	Oregon	Howard Hobson	46–33	Ohio State	Harold Olsen	Patten Gymnasium	Evanston, Illinois	
1940	Indiana	Branch McCracken	60–42	Kansas	Phog Allen	Municipal Auditorium	Kansas City, Missouri	
1941	Wisconsin	Bud Foster	39–34	Washington State	Jack Friel	Municipal Auditorium	Kansas City, Missouri	
1942	Stanford	Everett Dean	53–38	Dartmouth	O. B. Cowles	Municipal Auditorium	Kansas City, Missouri	
1943	Wyoming	Everett Shelton	46–34	Georgetown	Elmer Ripley	Madison Square Garden	New York City, New York	
1944	Utah	Vadal Peterson	42–40^{OT}	Dartmouth	Earl Brown	Madison Square Garden	New York City, New York	
1945	Oklahoma A&M	Henry Iba	49–45	NYU	Howard Cann	Madison Square Garden	New York City, New York	
1946	Oklahoma A&M	Henry Iba	43–40	North Carolina	Ben Carnevale	Madison Square Garden	New York City, New York	
1947	Holy Cross	Doggie Julian	58–47	Oklahoma	Bruce Drake	Madison Square Garden	New York City, New York	
1948	Kentucky	Adolph Rupp	58–42	Baylor	Bill Henderson	Madison Square Garden	New York City, New York	
1949	Kentucky	Adolph Rupp	46–36	Oklahoma A&M	Henry Iba	Hec Edmundson Pavilion	Seattle, Washington	
1950	CCNY	Nat Holman	71–68	Bradley	Forddy Anderson	Madison Square Garden	New York City, New York	
1951	Kentucky	Adolph Rupp	68–58	Kansas State	Jack Gardner	Williams Arena	Minneapolis, Minnesota	
1952	Kansas	Phog Allen	80–63	St. John's	Frank McGuire	Hec Edmundson Pavilion	Seattle, Washington	
1953	Indiana	Branch McCracken	69–68	Kansas	Phog Allen	Municipal Auditorium	Kansas City, Missouri	
1954	La Salle	Ken Loeffler	92–76	Bradley	Forddy Anderson	Municipal Auditorium	Kansas City, Missouri	
1955	San Francisco	Phil Woolpert	77–63	La Salle	Ken Loeffler	Municipal Auditorium	Kansas City, Missouri	
1956	San Francisco	Phil Woolpert	83–71	Iowa	Bucky O'Connor	McGaw Hall	Evanston, Illinois	
1957	North Carolina	Frank McGuire	54–53^{3OT}	Kansas	Dick Harp	Municipal Auditorium	Kansas City, Missouri	
1958	Kentucky	Adolph Rupp	84–72	Seattle	John Castellani	Freedom Hall	Louisville, Kentucky	
1959	California	Pete Newell	71–70	West Virginia	Fred Schaus	Freedom Hall	Louisville, Kentucky	
1960	Ohio State	Fred Taylor	75–55	California	Pete Newell	Cow Palace	Daly City, California	
1961	Cincinnati	Ed Jucker	70–65^{OT}	Ohio State	Fred Taylor	Municipal Auditorium	Kansas City, Missouri	
1962	Cincinnati	Ed Jucker	71–59	Ohio State	Fred Taylor	Freedom Hall	Louisville, Kentucky	
1963	Loyola Chicago	George Ireland	60–58^{OT}	Cincinnati	Ed Jucker	Freedom Hall	Louisville, Kentucky	
1964	UCLA	John Wooden	98–83	Duke	Vic Bubas	Municipal Auditorium	Kansas City, Missouri	
1965	UCLA	John Wooden	91–80	Michigan	Dave Strack	Memorial Coliseum	Portland, Oregon	
1966	Texas Western	Don Haskins	72–65	Kentucky	Adolph Rupp	Cole Field House	College Park, Maryland	
1967	UCLA	John Wooden	79–64	Dayton	Don Donoher	Freedom Hall	Louisville, Kentucky	
1968	UCLA	John Wooden	78–55	North Carolina	Dean Smith	Los Angeles Memorial Sports Arena	Los Angeles, California	
1969	UCLA	John Wooden	92–72	Purdue	George King	Freedom Hall	Louisville, Kentucky	
1970	UCLA	John Wooden	80–69	Jacksonville	Joe Williams	Cole Field House	College Park, Maryland	
1971	UCLA	John Wooden	68–62	Villanova* (Note: The result was later stricken from the NCAA record books due to NCAA rules violations committed by the team.)	Jack Kraft*	Astrodome	Houston, Texas	
1972	UCLA	John Wooden	81–76	Florida State	Hugh Durham	Los Angeles Memorial Sports Arena	Los Angeles, California	
1973	UCLA	John Wooden	87–66	Memphis State	Gene Bartow	St. Louis Arena	St. Louis, Missouri	
1974	NC State	Norm Sloan	76–64	Marquette	Al McGuire	Greensboro Coliseum	Greensboro, North Carolina	
1975	UCLA	John Wooden	92–85	Kentucky	Joe B. Hall	San Diego Sports Arena	San Diego, California	
1976	Indiana	Bob Knight	86–68	Michigan	Johnny Orr	Spectrum	Philadelphia, Pennsylvania	
1977	Marquette	Al McGuire	67–59	North Carolina	Dean Smith	Omni Coliseum	Atlanta, Georgia	
1978	Kentucky	Joe B. Hall	94–88	Duke	Bill Foster	The Checkerdome	St. Louis, Missouri	
1979	Michigan State	Jud Heathcote	75–64	Indiana State	Bill Hodges	Special Events Center	Salt Lake City, Utah	
1980	Louisville	Denny Crum	59–54	UCLA*	Larry Brown*	Market Square Arena	Indianapolis, Indiana	
1981	Indiana	Bob Knight	63–50	North Carolina	Dean Smith	Spectrum	Philadelphia, Pennsylvania	
1982	North Carolina	Dean Smith	63–62	Georgetown	John Thompson	Louisiana Superdome	New Orleans, Louisiana	
1983	NC State	Jim Valvano	54–52	Houston	Guy Lewis	University Arena	Albuquerque, New Mexico	
1984	Georgetown	John Thompson	84–75	Houston	Guy Lewis	Kingdome	Seattle, Washington	
1985	Villanova	Rollie Massimino	66–64	Georgetown	John Thompson	Rupp Arena	Lexington, Kentucky	
1986	Louisville	Denny Crum	72–69	Duke	Mike Krzyzewski	Reunion Arena	Dallas, Texas	
1987	Indiana	Bob Knight	74–73	Syracuse	Jim Boeheim	Louisiana Superdome	New Orleans, Louisiana	
1988	Kansas	Larry Brown	83–79	Oklahoma	Billy Tubbs	Kemper Arena	Kansas City, Missouri	
1989	Michigan	Steve Fisher	80–79^{OT}	Seton Hall	P. J. Carlesimo	Kingdome	Seattle, Washington	
1990	UNLV	Jerry Tarkanian	103–73	Duke	Mike Krzyzewski	McNichols Sports Arena	Denver, Colorado	
1991	Duke	Mike Krzyzewski	72–65	Kansas	Roy Williams	Hoosier Dome	Indianapolis, Indiana	
1992	Duke	Mike Krzyzewski	71–51	Michigan*	Steve Fisher*	Metrodome	Minneapolis, Minnesota	
1993	North Carolina	Dean Smith	77–71	Michigan*	Steve Fisher*	Louisiana Superdome	New Orleans, Louisiana	
1994	Arkansas	Nolan Richardson	76–72	Duke	Mike Krzyzewski	Charlotte Coliseum	Charlotte, North Carolina	
1995	UCLA	Jim Harrick	89–78	Arkansas	Nolan Richardson	Kingdome	Seattle, Washington	
1996	Kentucky	Rick Pitino	76–67	Syracuse	Jim Boeheim	Continental Airlines Arena	East Rutherford, New Jersey	
1997	Arizona	Lute Olson	84–79^{OT}	Kentucky	Rick Pitino	RCA Dome	Indianapolis, Indiana	
1998	Kentucky	Tubby Smith	78–69	Utah	Rick Majerus	Alamodome	San Antonio, Texas	
1999	Connecticut (Note: The University of Connecticut used the athletic brand of "Connecticut" until the 2013–14 season when it switched to the athletic brand to "UConn", which had been previously used as a short-form name.)	Jim Calhoun	77–74	Duke	Mike Krzyzewski	Tropicana Field	St. Petersburg, Florida	
2000	Michigan State	Tom Izzo	89–76	Florida	Billy Donovan	RCA Dome	Indianapolis, Indiana	
2001	Duke	Mike Krzyzewski	82–72	Arizona	Lute Olson	Metrodome	Minneapolis, Minnesota	
2002	Maryland	Gary Williams	64–52	Indiana	Mike Davis	Georgia Dome	Atlanta, Georgia	
2003	Syracuse	Jim Boeheim	81–78	Kansas	Roy Williams	Louisiana Superdome	New Orleans, Louisiana	
2004	Connecticut	Jim Calhoun	82–73	Georgia Tech	Paul Hewitt	Alamodome	San Antonio, Texas	
2005	North Carolina	Roy Williams	75–70	Illinois	Bruce Weber	Edward Jones Dome	St. Louis, Missouri	
2006	Florida	Billy Donovan	73–57	UCLA	Ben Howland	RCA Dome	Indianapolis, Indiana	
2007	Florida	Billy Donovan	84–75	Ohio State	Thad Matta	Georgia Dome	Atlanta, Georgia	
2008	Kansas	Bill Self	75–68^{OT}	Memphis*	John Calipari*	Alamodome	San Antonio, Texas	
2009	North Carolina	Roy Williams	89–72	Michigan State	Tom Izzo	Ford Field	Detroit, Michigan	
2010	Duke	Mike Krzyzewski	61–59	Butler	Brad Stevens	Lucas Oil Stadium	Indianapolis, Indiana	
2011	Connecticut	Jim Calhoun	53–41	Butler	Brad Stevens	Reliant Stadium	Houston, Texas	
2012	Kentucky	John Calipari	67–59	Kansas	Bill Self	Mercedes-Benz Superdome	New Orleans, Louisiana	
2013	Louisville* (Note: Louisville won the 2013 national championship game, but the NCAA vacated the title in 2018.)	Rick Pitino*	82–76*	Michigan	John Beilein	Georgia Dome	Atlanta, Georgia	
2014	UConn	Kevin Ollie	60–54	Kentucky	John Calipari	AT&T Stadium	Arlington, Texas	
2015	Duke	Mike Krzyzewski	68–63	Wisconsin	Bo Ryan	Lucas Oil Stadium	Indianapolis, Indiana	
2016	Villanova	Jay Wright	77–74	North Carolina	Roy Williams	NRG Stadium	Houston, Texas	
2017	North Carolina	Roy Williams	71–65	Gonzaga	Mark Few	University of Phoenix Stadium	Glendale, Arizona	
2018	Villanova	Jay Wright	79–62	Michigan	John Beilein	Alamodome	San Antonio, Texas	
2019	Virginia	Tony Bennett	85–77^{OT}	Texas Tech	Chris Beard	U.S. Bank Stadium	Minneapolis, Minnesota	
2020	Tournament not held due to the COVID-19 pandemic					Mercedes-Benz Stadium (scheduled)	Atlanta, Georgia (scheduled)	
2021	Baylor	Scott Drew	86–70	Gonzaga	Mark Few	Lucas Oil Stadium	Indianapolis, Indiana	
2022	Kansas	Bill Self	72–69	North Carolina	Hubert Davis	Caesars Superdome	New Orleans, Louisiana	
2023	UConn	Dan Hurley	76–59	San Diego State	Brian Dutcher	NRG Stadium	Houston, Texas	
2024	UConn	Dan Hurley	75–60	Purdue	Matt Painter	State Farm Stadium	Glendale, Arizona	
2025	Florida	Todd Golden	65–63	Houston	Kelvin Sampson	Alamodome	San Antonio, Texas	
2026	Michigan	Dusty May	69–63	UConn	Dan Hurley	Lucas Oil Stadium	Indianapolis, Indiana	
2027						Ford Field	Detroit, Michigan	
2028						Allegiant Stadium	Paradise, Nevada	
2029						Lucas Oil Stadium	Indianapolis, Indiana	
2030						AT&T Stadium	Arlington, Texas	
2031						Mercedes-Benz Stadium	Atlanta, Georgia	

== Multiple champions ==
Teams with multiple championships
Team	Number	Years won
UCLA	11	1964, 1965, 1967, 1968, 1969, 1970, 1971, 1972, 1973, 1975, 1995
Kentucky	8	1948, 1949, 1951, 1958, 1978, 1996, 1998, 2012
North Carolina	6	1957, 1982, 1993, 2005, 2009, 2017
UConn	6	1999, 2004, 2011, 2014, 2023, 2024
Duke	5	1991, 1992, 2001, 2010, 2015
Indiana	5	1940, 1953, 1976, 1981, 1987
Kansas	4	1952, 1988, 2008, 2022
Florida	3	2006, 2007, 2025
Villanova	3	1985, 2016, 2018
Louisville	2 (3*)	1980, 1986, 2013*
Cincinnati	2	1961, 1962
Michigan	2	1989, 2026
Michigan State	2	1979, 2000
NC State	2	1974, 1983
Oklahoma State (Note: Oklahoma A&M changed its name to Oklahoma State in 1957.)	2	1945, 1946
San Francisco	2	1955, 1956

== National champion coaches ==
A total of 54 coaches have won a national championship. Of those, 17 have won multiple championships. John Wooden leads all coaches with ten championships, followed by Mike Krzyzewski at five, Adolph Rupp at four, and Jim Calhoun, Bob Knight, and Roy Williams tied at three. Rick Pitino is the only coach to win a national championship at multiple schools, winning with Kentucky in 1996 and Louisville in 2013; however, the latter championship has been vacated by the NCAA.

National champion coaches
Coach	Number	Team	Years won
Phog Allen	1	Kansas	1952
Tony Bennett	1	Virginia	2019
Jim Boeheim	1	Syracuse	2003
Larry Brown	1	Kansas	1988
Jim Calhoun	3	UConn	1999, 2004, 2011
John Calipari	1	Kentucky	2012
Denny Crum	2	Louisville	1980, 1986
Everett Dean	1	Stanford	1942
Billy Donovan	2	Florida	2006, 2007
Scott Drew	1	Baylor	2021
Steve Fisher	1	Michigan	1989
Bud Foster	1	Wisconsin	1941
Todd Golden	1	Florida	2025
Joe B. Hall	1	Kentucky	1978
Jim Harrick	1	UCLA	1995
Don Haskins	1	UTEP (Note: The University of Texas at El Paso (UTEP) was named Texas Western College before 1967.)	1966
Jud Heathcote	1	Michigan State	1979
Howard Hobson	1	Oregon	1939
Nat Holman	1	CCNY	1950
Dan Hurley	2	UConn	2023, 2024
Henry Iba	2	Oklahoma State	1945, 1946
George Ireland	1	Loyola Chicago	1963
Tom Izzo	1	Michigan State	2000
Ed Jucker	2	Cincinnati	1961, 1962
Doggie Julian	1	Holy Cross	1947
Bob Knight	3	Indiana	1976, 1981, 1987
Mike Krzyzewski	5	Duke	1991, 1992, 2001, 2010, 2015
Ken Loeffler	1	La Salle	1954
Rollie Massimino	1	Villanova	1985
Dusty May	1	Michigan	2026
Branch McCracken	2	Indiana	1940, 1953
Al McGuire	1	Marquette	1977
Frank McGuire	1	North Carolina	1957
Pete Newell	1	California	1959
Kevin Ollie	1	UConn	2014
Lute Olson	1	Arizona	1997
Vadal Peterson	1	Utah	1944
Rick Pitino	1 (2*)	Kentucky	1996
Rick Pitino	1 (2*)	Louisville	2013*
Nolan Richardson	1	Arkansas	1994
Adolph Rupp	4	Kentucky	1948, 1949, 1951, 1958
Bill Self	2	Kansas	2008, 2022
Everett Shelton	1	Wyoming	1943
Norm Sloan	1	NC State	1974
Dean Smith	2	North Carolina	1982, 1993
Tubby Smith	1	Kentucky	1998
Jerry Tarkanian	1	UNLV	1990
Fred Taylor	1	Ohio State	1960
John Thompson	1	Georgetown	1984
Jim Valvano	1	NC State	1983
Gary Williams	1	Maryland	2002
Roy Williams	3	North Carolina	2005, 2009, 2017
John Wooden	10	UCLA	1964, 1965, 1967, 1968, 1969, 1970, 1971, 1972, 1973, 1975
Phil Woolpert	2	San Francisco	1955, 1956
Jay Wright	2	Villanova	2016, 2018

== Champions by conference ==
Championships by contemporary conference membership
Conference	Number	Years won	Teams	Ref(s)
Atlantic Coast Conference (1953–current)	15	1957, 1974, 1982, 1983, 1991, 1992, 1993, 2001, 2002, 2005, 2009, 2010, 2015, 2017, 2019	Duke, Maryland, North Carolina, NC State, Virginia	
American Conference (2014–current)	1	2014	UConn	
Big East Conference (1979–current)	10 (*11)	1984, 1985, 1999, 2003, 2004, 2011, 2013, 2016, 2018, 2023, 2024	Georgetown, Louisville*, Syracuse, UConn, Villanova	
Big 8 Conference (1907–1996)	2	1952, 1988	Kansas	
Big Ten Conference (1896–current)	11	1940, 1941, 1953, 1960, 1976, 1979, 1981, 1987, 1989, 2000, 2026	Indiana, Michigan, Michigan State, Ohio State, Wisconsin	
Big 12 Conference (1997–current)	3	2008, 2021, 2022	Baylor, Kansas	
Big West Conference (1969–current)	1	1990	UNLV	
Independents	6	1944, 1947, 1954, 1963, 1966, 1977	Holy Cross, La Salle, Loyola Chicago, Marquette, Utah, UTEP	
Metro Conference (1975–1995) (1975–1995)	2	1980, 1986	Louisville	
Metropolitan New York Conference (1933–1963)	1	1950	CCNY	
Missouri Valley Conference (1907–current)	4	1945, 1946, 1961, 1962	Cincinnati, Oklahoma State	
Mountain States Conference (1938–1962)	1	1943	Wyoming	
Southeastern Conference (1932–current)	12	1948, 1949, 1951, 1958, 1978, 1994, 1996, 1998, 2006, 2007, 2012, 2025	Arkansas, Florida, Kentucky	
Pac-12 Conference (1915–2024)	15	1939, 1942, 1959, 1964, 1965, 1967, 1968, 1969, 1970, 1971, 1972, 1973, 1975, 1995, 1997	Arizona, California, Oregon, Stanford, UCLA	
West Coast Conference (1952–current)	2	1955, 1956	San Francisco	

== Multiple runners-up ==
Multiple runners-up
Team	Number	Years runners-up
Duke	6	1964, 1978, 1986, 1990, 1994, 1999
Kansas	6	1940, 1953, 1957, 1991, 2003, 2012
North Carolina	6	1946, 1968, 1977, 1981, 2016, 2022
Michigan	4 (6*)	1965, 1976, 1992*, 1993*, 2013, 2018
Kentucky	4	1966, 1975, 1997, 2014
Ohio State	4	1939, 1961, 1962, 2007
Georgetown	3	1943, 1982, 1985
Houston	3	1983, 1984, 2025
Bradley	2	1950, 1954
Butler	2	2010, 2011
Dartmouth	2	1942, 1944
Gonzaga	2	2017, 2021
Oklahoma	2	1947, 1988
Purdue	2	1969, 2024
Syracuse	2	1987, 1996
UCLA	1 (2*)	1980*, 2006

== Championship game appearances ==
Championship game appearances
Team	Appearances	Wins	Losses	Winning Percentage
Arizona	2	1	1	0.500
Arkansas	2	1	1	0.500
Baylor	2	1	1	0.500
Bradley	2	0	2	0.000
Butler	2	0	2	0.000
California	2	1	1	0.500
CCNY	1	1	0	1.000
Cincinnati	3	2	1	0.667
Dartmouth	2	0	2	0.000
Dayton	1	0	1	0.000
Duke	11	5	6	0.455
Florida	4	3	1	0.750
Florida State	1	0	1	0.000
Georgetown	4	1	3	0.250
Georgia Tech	1	0	1	0.000
Gonzaga	2	0	2	0.000
Holy Cross	1	1	0	1.000
Houston	3	0	3	0.000
Illinois	1	0	1	0.000
Indiana	6	5	1	0.833
Indiana State	1	0	1	0.000
Iowa	1	0	1	0.000
Jacksonville	1	0	1	0.000
Kansas	10	4	6	0.400
Kansas State	1	0	1	0.000
La Salle	2	1	1	0.500
Louisville	3	3	0	1.000
Loyola Chicago	1	1	0	1.000
Marquette	2	1	1	0.500
Maryland	1	1	0	1.000
Memphis State	1	0	1	0.000
Memphis	1	0	1	0.000
Michigan State	3	2	1	0.667
Michigan	8	2	6	0.250
NC State	2	2	0	1.000
North Carolina	12	6	6	0.500
NYU	1	0	1	0.000
Ohio State	5	1	4	0.200
Oklahoma	2	0	2	0.000
Oklahoma State	3	2	1	0.667
Oregon	1	1	0	1.000
Purdue	2	0	2	0.000
San Diego State	1	0	1	0.000
San Francisco	2	2	0	1.000
Seattle	1	0	1	0.000
Seton Hall	1	0	1	0.000
St. John's	1	0	1	0.000
Stanford	1	1	0	1.000
Syracuse	3	1	2	0.333
Texas Tech	1	0	1	0.000
UCLA	13	11	2	0.846
UConn	7	6	1	0.857
UNLV	1	1	0	1.000
Utah	2	1	1	0.500
UTEP	1	1	0	1.000
Villanova	4	3	1	0.750
Virginia	1	1	0	1.000
Washington State	1	0	1	0.000
West Virginia	1	0	1	0.000
Wisconsin	2	1	1	0.500
Wyoming	1	1	0	1.000

== See also ==
- NCAA Division I men's basketball tournament records
- Helms Athletic Foundation national champions
- Mythical national championships in college basketball
