= Bill Cowden =

American basketball player

Personal information
- Born: September 6, 1920 San Francisco, California, U.S.
- Died: October 17, 2007 (aged 87) San Francisco, California, U.S.
- Listed height: 6 ft 3 in (1.91 m)

Career information
- High school: Lowell (San Francisco, California)
- College: Stanford (1939–1942)
- Position: Guard
- Number: 11

Career highlights
- NCAA champion (1942)

William Cowden (September 6, 1920 – October 17, 2007) was an American basketball player.

A 6-foot-3-inch (191 cm) guard from Lowell High School in San Francisco, California, Cowden played collegiately for Stanford University with his Lowell teammate, Don Burness. In 1942, Cowden was team captain and led Stanford to the 1942 NCAA Championship, in which he played all 40 minutes and scored 5 points. He earned first-team All-PCC honors.

After his basketball career, Cowden worked for Pan Am and served as director of their Southeast Asia office. He and his wife Beverly had three sons. He is a member of the Stanford Athletic Hall of Fame. He died in San Francisco in 2007.
