= Linari =

Linari is an Italian surname. Notable people with the surname include:

- Elena Linari (born 1994), Italian footballer who plays in the English, Women's Super League
- Fred Linari (1920–2012), American basketball player
- Nancy Linari, American voice actress
- Pietro Linari (1896–1972), Italian cyclist
