= Don Burness =

American basketball player

Personal information
- Born: June 1, 1919 San Francisco, California, U.S.
- Died: March 3, 1987 (aged 67) Yountville, California, U.S.
- Listed height: 6 ft 3 in (1.91 m)

Career information
- High school: Lowell (San Francisco, California)
- College: Stanford (1940–1942)
- Position: Forward / center
- Number: 8

Career highlights
- NCAA champion (1942); Consensus second-team All-American (1942); First-team All-PCC (1941); 2× California Mr. Basketball (1936, 1937)

Donald S. Burness (June 1, 1919 – March 3, 1987) was an All-American basketball player at Stanford University.

== College career ==
Burness, who was 6 feet 3 inches (1.91 m), played center in high school at Lowell High School in San Francisco. He switched to playing forward when he was recruited to Stanford along with his Lowell teammate, 6-foot-3-inch (1.91 m) Bill Cowden. The team's average height of 6 feet 4 inches (1.93 m), tall for the time, earned them the nickname "The Tall Redwoods."

In his senior year of 1942, Burness helped Stanford to a 28–4 record, and he was named a second-team All-American for the season. In the postseason, the Indians beat Oregon State to advance to the western regional of 1942 NCAA men's basketball championship. During the Oregon State series, Burness injured his ankle and did not play in the regional semifinals and finals, but Stanford advanced to the final without him. In the final game, Burness started the game, but could not continue due to his ankle injury. Jim Pollard, another key starter for the Indians, was also sidelined due to the flu. Despite missing two key starters, Stanford prevailed over Dartmouth, 53–38, to win its only NCAA men's basketball title to date.

== After college ==
Following his college career, Burness played for the Oakland Bittners of the Amateur Athletic Union. He was named to the Stanford Athletic Hall of Fame in 1960.
