= 1982–83 UCLA Bruins men's basketball team =

American college basketball season

1982–83 UCLA Bruins men's basketball

Pac-10 champions

NCAA tournament, Second Round
- Conference: Pacific-10

Ranking
- Coaches: No. 7
- AP: No. 7
- Record: 23–6 (15–3, 1st Pac-10)
- Head coach: Larry Farmer
- Assistant coaches: Criag Impelman; Chris Lippert; Kevin O'Connor
- Home arena: Pauley Pavilion

1982–83 Pacific-10 Conference men's basketball standings
	Conf.				Overall
Team	W		L	PCT	W		L	PCT
No. 7 UCLA	15	–	3	.833	23	–	6	.793
Washington State	14	–	4	.778	23	–	7	.767
Oregon State	12	–	6	.667	20	–	11	.645
Arizona State	12	–	6	.667	19	–	14	.576
USC	11	–	7	.611	17	–	11	.607
Washington	7	–	11	.389	16	–	15	.516
California	7	–	11	.389	14	–	14	.500
Stanford	6	–	12	.333	14	–	14	.500
Oregon	5	–	13	.278	9	–	18	.333
Arizona	1	–	17	.056	4	–	24	.143
As of April 15, 1983; Rankings from AP Poll

The 1982–83 UCLA Bruins men's basketball team represented the University of California, Los Angeles in the 1982–83 NCAA Division I men's basketball season. Larry Farmer was in his second year as the head coach, and the Bruins started the season ranked 7th in the nation (AP Poll). On December 28, the Bruins hosted #13 Louisville, winning 76–72. UCLA beat the #18 (AP Poll) Washington Huskies 84–65, on February 2. UCLA's team won the Pac-10 regular season and finished 7th in the AP and UPI polls.

== Starting lineup ==
Position	Player	Class
F	Kenny Fields	Jr.
F	Darren Daye	Sr.
C	Stuart Gray	So.
G	Rod Foster	Sr.
G	Ralph Jackson	Jr.

== Roster ==
1982–83 UCLA Bruins men's basketball team
Players
Coaches

Pos.	#	Name	Height	Weight	Year	Hometown
G	24	Randy Arrillaga	6 ft 1 in (1.85 m)	—	Sr
F	30	Darren Daye	6 ft 8 in (2.03 m)	—	Sr	Des Moines, Iowa
F	54	Kenny Fields	6 ft 7 in (2.01 m)	—	Jr	Iowa City, Iowa
G	10	Rod Foster	6 ft 1 in (1.85 m)	—	Sr	Birmingham, Alabama
C	55	Stuart Gray	7 ft 0 in (2.13 m)	—	So	Panama Canal Zone, Panama
G	14	Michael Holton (C)	6 ft 4 in (1.93 m)	—	Sr	Seattle, Washington
G	3	Ralph Jackson	6 ft 2 in (1.88 m)	—	Jr
F	11	Curtis Knight	6 ft 5 in (1.96 m)	—	Jr
F	53	Gary Maloncon	6 ft 8 in (2.03 m)	—	So
F	25	Nigel Miguel	6 ft 5 in (1.96 m)	—	So
C	32	Brad Wright	6 ft 10 in (2.08 m)	—	So	Hollywood, California

Head coach

Larry Farmer (UCLA)

Assistant coach(es)

- Craig Impelman
- Chris Lippert
- Kevin O'Connor

Legend

- (C) Team captain
- (S) Suspended
- (I) Ineligible
- (W) Walk-on
- Injured
- Current redshirt

Roster

== Schedule ==
Date time, TV	Rank^{#}	Opponent^{#}	Result	Record	Site city, state
Regular Season
November 26, 1982	No. 7	at BYU	W 85–82	1–0	Marriott Center (23,023); Provo, UT
December 2, 1982	No. 6	at DePaul	W 73–70 ^{OT}	2–0	Rosemont Horizon (13,458); Chicago, IL
December 4, 1982	No. 6	at Notre Dame	W 65–64	3–0	Athletic & Convocation Center (11,345); Notre Dame, IN
December 11, 1982	No. 5	San Jose State	W 94–71	4–0	Pauley Pavilion (8,215); Los Angeles, CA
December 18, 1982	No. 4	No. 7 Iowa	W 75–66	5–0	Pauley Pavilion (10,867); Los Angeles, CA
December 20, 1982	No. 4	LSU	W 82–68	6–0	Pauley Pavilion (10,214); Los Angeles, CA
December 23, 1982	No. 3	at Maryland	L 79–80 ^{2OT}	6–1	Cole Field House (14,500); College Park, MD
December 28, 1982	No. 5	No. 13 Louisville	W 76–72	7–1	Pauley Pavilion (12,567); Los Angeles, CA
January 8, 1983	No. 6	at Arizona	W 92–87	8–1 (1–0)	McKale Center (7,544); Tucson, AZ
January 10, 1983	No. 6	at Arizona State	W 87–86	9–1 (2–0)	ASU Activity Center (12,286); Tempe, AZ
January 13, 1983	No. 5	Oregon	W 97–69	10–1 (3–0)	Pauley Pavilion (10,137); Los Angeles, CA
January 15, 1983	No. 5	Oregon State	W 99–77	11–1 (4–0)	Pauley Pavilion (12,102); Los Angeles, CA
January 20, 1983	No. 1	at California	W 68–63	12–1 (5–0)	Harmon Gym (6,656); Berkeley, CA
January 22, 1983	No. 1	at Stanford	W 101–87	13–1 (6–0)	Maples Pavilion (8,000); Stanford, CA
January 28, 1983	No. 1	Alabama	L 67–70	13–2	Pauley Pavilion (12,574); Los Angeles, CA
January 30, 1983	No. 1	Notre Dame	W 59–53	14–2	Pauley Pavilion (11,425); Los Angeles, CA
February 3, 1983; 8:00 pm, ESPN	No. 7	No. 18 Washington State	W 89–87 ^{OT}	15–2 (7–0)	Pauley Pavilion (12,117); Los Angeles, CA
February 5, 1983	No. 7	Washington	W 84–65	16–2 (8–0)	Pauley Pavilion (10,148); Los Angeles, CA
February 10, 1983	No. 5	at Oregon	W 67–56	17–2 (9–0)	McArthur Court (6,002); Eugene, OR
February 12, 1983	No. 5	at Oregon State	L 65–69	17–3 (9–1)	Gill Coliseum (10,000); Corvallis, OR
February 17, 1983	No. 10	Stanford	W 99–86	18–3 (10–1)	Pauley Pavilion (9,224); Los Angeles, CA
February 19, 1983	No. 10	California	W 70–60	19–3 (11–1)	Pauley Pavilion (9,244); Los Angeles, CA
February 24, 1983	No. 8	USC	W 77–60	20–3 (12–1)	Pauley Pavilion (12,417); Los Angeles, CA
February 26, 1983	No. 8	at USC	W 71–64	21–3 (13–1)	Los Angeles Memorial Sports Arena (14,454); Los Angeles, CA
March 5, 1983	No. 6	at Washington	W 90–66	22–3 (14–1)	Hec Edmundson Pavilion (5,616); Seattle, WA
March 7, 1983; 8:00 pm, USA	No. 6	at Washington State	L 68–70	22–4 (14–2)	Beasley Coliseum (12,422); Pullman, WA
March 10, 1983	No. 4	Arizona	W 111–58	23–4 (15–2)	Pauley Pavilion (10,091); Los Angeles, CA
March 12, 1983	No. 4	Arizona State	L 76–78	23–5 (15–3)	Pauley Pavilion (11,416); Los Angeles, CA
NCAA Tournament
March 19, 1983; 1:30 pm, CBS	No. 7	vs. Utah; Second Round	L 61–67	23–6	BSU Pavilion (12,177); Boise, ID
*Non-conference game. ^{#}Rankings from AP Poll. (#) Tournament seedings in parentheses. All times are in Pacific time.
