= 1941–42 Idaho Vandals men's basketball team =

American college basketball season

1941–42 Idaho Vandals men's basketball
- Conference: Pacific Coast Conference
- Record: 12–16 (3–13 PCC)
- Head coach: Guy Wicks (1st season)
- Assistant coach: James "Babe" Brown
- MVP: Ray Turner
- Home arena: Memorial Gymnasium

1941–42 Pacific Coast Conference men's basketball standings
	Conf.				Overall
Team	W		L	PCT	W		L	PCT
North
Oregon State	11	–	5	.688	18	–	9	.667
Washington	10	–	6	.625	18	–	7	.720
Washington State	9	–	7	.563	21	–	8	.724
Oregon	7	–	9	.438	12	–	15	.444
Idaho	3	–	13	.188	12	–	16	.429
South
Stanford †	11	–	1	.917	28	–	4	.875
USC	7	–	5	.583	12	–	8	.600
California	4	–	8	.333	11	–	19	.367
UCLA	2	–	10	.167	5	–	18	.217
† Conference playoff series winner

The 1941–42 Idaho Vandals men's basketball team represented the University of Idaho during the 1941–42 NCAA college basketball season. Members of the Pacific Coast Conference, the Vandals were led by first-year head coach Guy Wicks and played their home games on campus at Memorial Gymnasium in Moscow, Idaho.

The Vandals were 12–16 overall and 3–13 in conference play. Center Ray Turner set the Northern Division scoring record with 192 points in sixteen games (12.0 ppg).

Alumnus Wicks had returned to Moscow after a decade in Pocatello at the UI-Southern Branch. He entered the U.S. Navy in late 1942 during World War II, and returned to coach in the 1946–47 season. In the meanwhile, the basketball program was led by acting athletic director James "Babe" Brown, who coached the freshmen this season.
