= 1941–42 Washington State Cougars men's basketball team =

American college basketball season

1941–42 Washington State Cougars men's basketball
- Conference: Pacific Coast Conference
- Record: 21–8 (9–7 PCC)
- Head coach: Jack Friel (14th season)
- Home arena: WSC Gymnasium

1941–42 Pacific Coast Conference men's basketball standings
	Conf.				Overall
Team	W		L	PCT	W		L	PCT
North
Oregon State	11	–	5	.688	18	–	9	.667
Washington	10	–	6	.625	18	–	7	.720
Washington State	9	–	7	.563	21	–	8	.724
Oregon	7	–	9	.438	12	–	15	.444
Idaho	3	–	13	.188	12	–	16	.429
South
Stanford †	11	–	1	.917	28	–	4	.875
USC	7	–	5	.583	12	–	8	.600
California	4	–	8	.333	11	–	19	.367
UCLA	2	–	10	.167	5	–	18	.217
† Conference playoff series winner

The 1941–42 Washington State Cougars men's basketball team represented Washington State College for the 1941–42 college basketball season. Led by fourteenth-year head coach Jack Friel, the Cougars were members of the Pacific Coast Conference and played their home games on campus at the WSC Gymnasium in Pullman, Washington.

The Cougars were 21–8 overall in the regular season and 9–7 in conference play, third in the Northern division.
