= 1941–42 UCLA Bruins men's basketball team =

American college basketball season

1941–42 UCLA Bruins men's basketball
- Conference: Pacific Coast Conference
- South
- Record: 5–18 (2–10 PCC)
- Head coach: Wilbur Johns (3rd season)
- Assistant coach: Don Ashen
- Home arena: Men's Gym

1941–42 Pacific Coast Conference men's basketball standings
| | Conf. | | | | Overall |
| Team | W | | L | PCT | W | | L | PCT |
|---|---|---|---|---|---|---|---|---|
North
| Oregon State | 11 | – | 5 | .688 | 18 | – | 9 | .667 |
| Washington | 10 | – | 6 | .625 | 18 | – | 7 | .720 |
| Washington State | 9 | – | 7 | .563 | 21 | – | 8 | .724 |
| Oregon | 7 | – | 9 | .438 | 12 | – | 15 | .444 |
| Idaho | 3 | – | 13 | .188 | 12 | – | 16 | .429 |
South
| Stanford † | 11 | – | 1 | .917 | 28 | – | 4 | .875 |
| USC | 7 | – | 5 | .583 | 12 | – | 8 | .600 |
| California | 4 | – | 8 | .333 | 11 | – | 19 | .367 |
| UCLA | 2 | – | 10 | .167 | 5 | – | 18 | .217 |
† Conference playoff series winner

The 1941–42 UCLA Bruins men's basketball team represented the University of California, Los Angeles during the 1941–42 NCAA men's basketball season and were members of the Pacific Coast Conference. The Bruins were led by third year head coach Wilbur Johns. They finished the regular season with a record of 5–18 and were fourth in the PCC southern division with a record of 2–10.

== Previous season ==
The Bruins finished the regular season with a record of 6–20 and were fourth in the PCC southern division with a record of 2–10.

== Roster ==
1941–42 UCLA Bruins men's basketball team
Players
Coaches

| Pos. | # | Name | Height | Weight | Year | Hometown |
|---|---|---|---|---|---|---|
| G | 5 | Bob Alshuler (C) | — | — |
| G | 15 | Jack Bradley | — | — |
| G | 21 | Noah Curtis | — | — |
| F | | John Fryer | — | — |
| G | | Larry Gittler | — | — |
| F | 6 | Ernie Hansdelsman (C) | — | — |
| C | 20 | Roger Hillis | — | — |
| C | | Marvin Lee | — | — |
| C | 23 | Bill O'Brien | — | — |
| F | 14 | Mickey Panovich | — | — |
| F | 4 | Richard Perry | — | — |
| G | 13 | Roger Terry | — | — |
| | | Spencer Williams | — | — |

Head coach

Wilbur Johns (UCLA)

Assistant coach(es)

- Don Ashen (UCLA)

Legend

- (C) Team captain
- (S) Suspended
- (I) Ineligible
- (W) Walk-on
- Injured
- Current redshirt

Roster
Last update: 30 January 2018

== Schedule ==
| Date time, TV | Rank^{#} | Opponent^{#} | Result | Record | Site city, state |
Regular Season
| * | | Loyola Marymount | W 39–36 | 1–0 | Men's Gym; Los Angeles, CA |
| * | | at Creighton | L 18–34 | 1–1 | University Gym; Omaha, NE |
| * | | at Purdue | L 27–38 | 1–2 | Lambert Fieldhouse; West Lafayette, IN |
| * | | at Indiana | L 33–47 | 1–3 | The Fieldhouse; Bloomington, IN |
| * | | at Nebraska | W 42–36 | 2–3 | Nebraska Coliseum; Lincoln, NE |
| * | | Loyola | L 45–53 | 2–4 | Men's Gym; Los Angeles, CA |
| * | | Loyola Marymount | L 34–40 | 2–5 | Men's Gym; Los Angeles, CA |
| * | | at San Francisco | L 40–46 | 2–6 | Kezar Pavilion; San Francisco, CA |
| * | | at Santa Clara | W 67–52 | 3–6 | Santa Clara, CA |
| | | USC | L 51–59 | 3–7 (0–1) | Men's Gym; Los Angeles, CA |
| * | | 20th Century Fox | L 49–60 | 3–8 | Men's Gym; Los Angeles, CA |
| | | at Stanford | L 43–54 | 3–9 (0–2) | Stanford Pavilion; Stanford, CA |
| | | at Stanford | L 30–49 | 3–10 (0–3) | Stanford Pavilion; Stanford, CA |
| * | | at 20th Century Fox | L 54–55 | 3–11 | Los Angeles City College Gym; Los Angeles, CA |
| | | California | L 50–54 | 3–12 (0–4) | Men's Gym; Los Angeles, CA |
| | | California | W 50–34 | 4–12 (1–4) | Men's Gym; Los Angeles, CA |
| | | at USC | L 30–42 | 4–13 (1–5) | Shrine Auditorium; Los Angeles, CA |
| | | Stanford | L 30–42 | 4–14 (1–6) | Men's Gym; Los Angeles, CA |
| | | Stanford | L 28–36 | 4–15 (1–7) | Men's Gym; Los Angeles, CA |
| | | at California | W 33–32 | 5–15 (2–7) | Men's Gym; Berkeley, CA |
| | | at California | L 43–51 | 5–16 (2–8) | Men's Gym; Berkeley, CA |
| | | USC | L 44–63 | 5–17 (2–9) | Men's Gym; Los Angeles, CA |
| | | USC | L 35–49 | 5–18 (2–10) | Men's Gym; Los Angeles, CA |
*Non-conference game. ^{#}Rankings from AP Poll. (#) Tournament seedings in parentheses. All times are in Pacific Time.
