= 1941–42 Washington Huskies men's basketball team =

American college basketball season

1941–42 Washington Huskies men's basketball
- Conference: Pacific Coast Conference
- Record: 18–7 (10–6 PCC)
- Head coach: Hec Edmundson (22rd season)
- Captain: Bob Lindh
- Home arena: UW Pavilion

1941–42 Pacific Coast Conference men's basketball standings
	Conf.				Overall
Team	W		L	PCT	W		L	PCT
North
Oregon State	11	–	5	.688	18	–	9	.667
Washington	10	–	6	.625	18	–	7	.720
Washington State	9	–	7	.563	21	–	8	.724
Oregon	7	–	9	.438	12	–	15	.444
Idaho	3	–	13	.188	12	–	16	.429
South
Stanford †	11	–	1	.917	28	–	4	.875
USC	7	–	5	.583	12	–	8	.600
California	4	–	8	.333	11	–	19	.367
UCLA	2	–	10	.167	5	–	18	.217
† Conference playoff series winner

The 1941–42 Washington Huskies men's basketball team represented the University of Washington for the 1941–42 NCAA college basketball season. Led by 22nd-year head coach Hec Edmundson, the Huskies were members of the Pacific Coast Conference and played their home games on campus at the UW Pavilion in Seattle, Washington.

The Huskies were 18–7 overall in the regular season and 10–6 in conference play. They placed second in the Northern division.
