= 1942 NCAA basketball championship game =

1942 NCAA Tournament Championship Game
National championship game
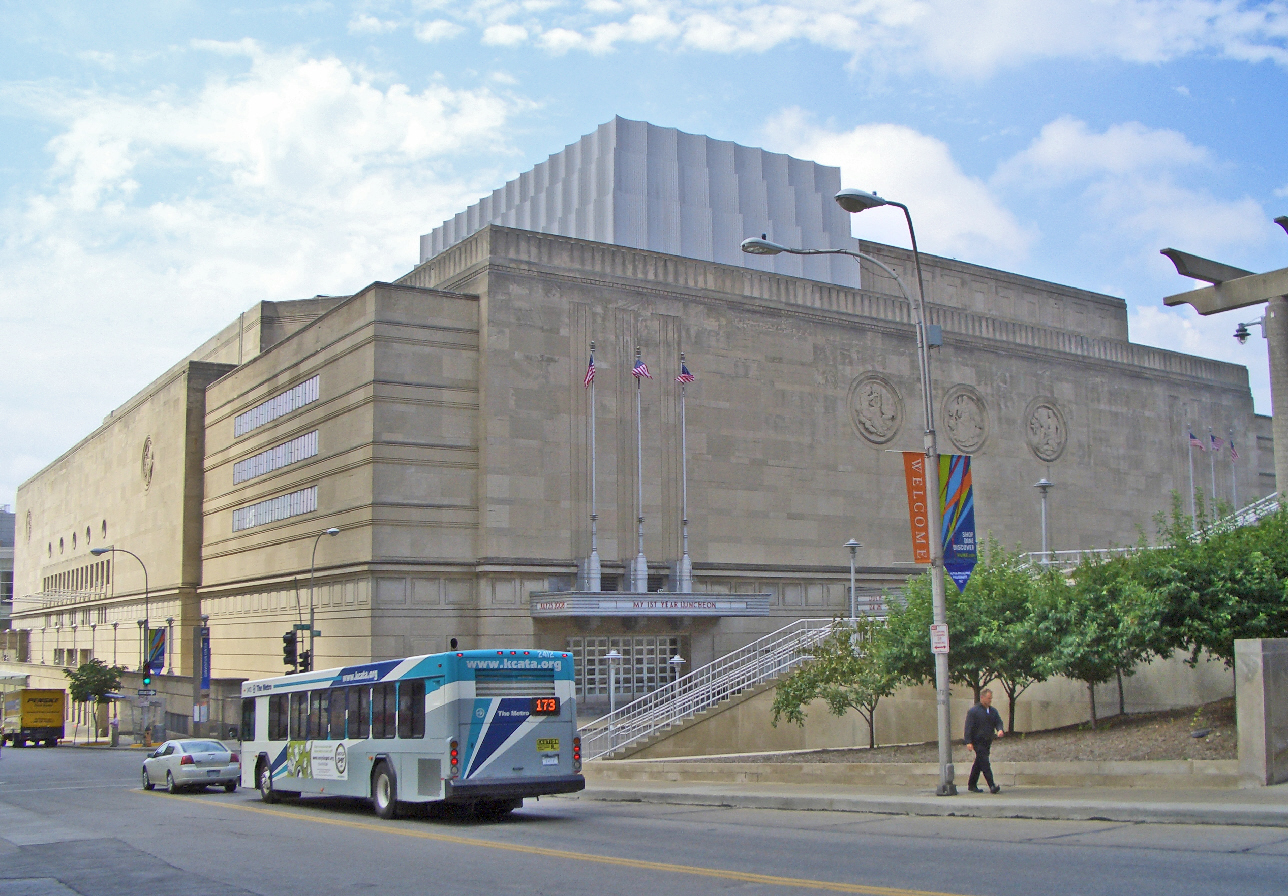
- The Municipal Auditorium in Kansas City, Missouri, hosted the championship game.
Stanford Indians	Dartmouth Indians
PCC	Ivy
(27-4)	(22-3)
53	38
Head coach: Everett Dean	Head coach: Ozzie Cowles
	1st half	2nd half	Total
Stanford Indians	24	29	53
Dartmouth Indians	22	16	38
- Date: March 28, 1942
- Venue: Municipal Auditorium, Kansas City, Missouri
- MVP: Howie Dallmar, Stanford

The 1942 NCAA University Division Basketball Championship Game was the finals of the 1942 NCAA basketball tournament and it determined the national champion for the 1941-42 NCAA men's basketball season. The game was played on March 28, 1942, at Municipal Auditorium in Kansas City, Missouri. It featured the Stanford Indians of the Pacific Coast Conference, and the Dartmouth Indians of the Ivy League.

== Participating teams ==
=== Stanford Indians ===
- West
  - Stanford 53, Rice 47
- Final Four
  - Stanford 46, Colorado 35

=== Dartmouth Indians ===
- East
  - Dartmouth 44, Penn State 39
- Final Four
  - Dartmouth 47, Kentucky 28

== Game summary ==
March 28, 1942

Stanford Indians 53, Dartmouth Indians 38
Scoring by half: 24-22, 29-16
Pts: George Munroe 12	Pts: Bill Feeny 8

Municipal Auditorium, Kansas City, Missouri
