= 1982–83 Washington Huskies men's basketball team =

American college basketball season

1982–83 Washington Huskies men's basketball
- Conference: Pacific-10 Conference
- Record: 16–15 (7–11 Pac-10)
- Head coach: Marv Harshman (12th season)
- Assistant coach: Bob Johnson
- Home arena: Hec Edmundson Pavilion

1982–83 Pacific-10 Conference men's basketball standings
	Conf.				Overall
Team	W		L	PCT	W		L	PCT
No. 7 UCLA	15	–	3	.833	23	–	6	.793
Washington State	14	–	4	.778	23	–	7	.767
Oregon State	12	–	6	.667	20	–	11	.645
Arizona State	12	–	6	.667	19	–	14	.576
USC	11	–	7	.611	17	–	11	.607
Washington	7	–	11	.389	16	–	15	.516
California	7	–	11	.389	14	–	14	.500
Stanford	6	–	12	.333	14	–	14	.500
Oregon	5	–	13	.278	9	–	18	.333
Arizona	1	–	17	.056	4	–	24	.143
As of April 15, 1983; Rankings from AP Poll

The 1982–83 Washington Huskies men's basketball team represented the University of Washington for the 1982–83 NCAA Division I men's basketball season. Led by twelfth-year head coach Marv Harshman, the Huskies were members of the Pacific-10 Conference and played their home games on campus at Hec Edmundson Pavilion in Seattle, Washington.

The Huskies were 16–15 overall in the regular season and 7–11 in conference play, tied for sixth in the standings. There was no conference tournament yet; it debuted four years later.
