= Osborne Cowles =

American basketball player and coach (1899–1997)

Ozzie Cowles
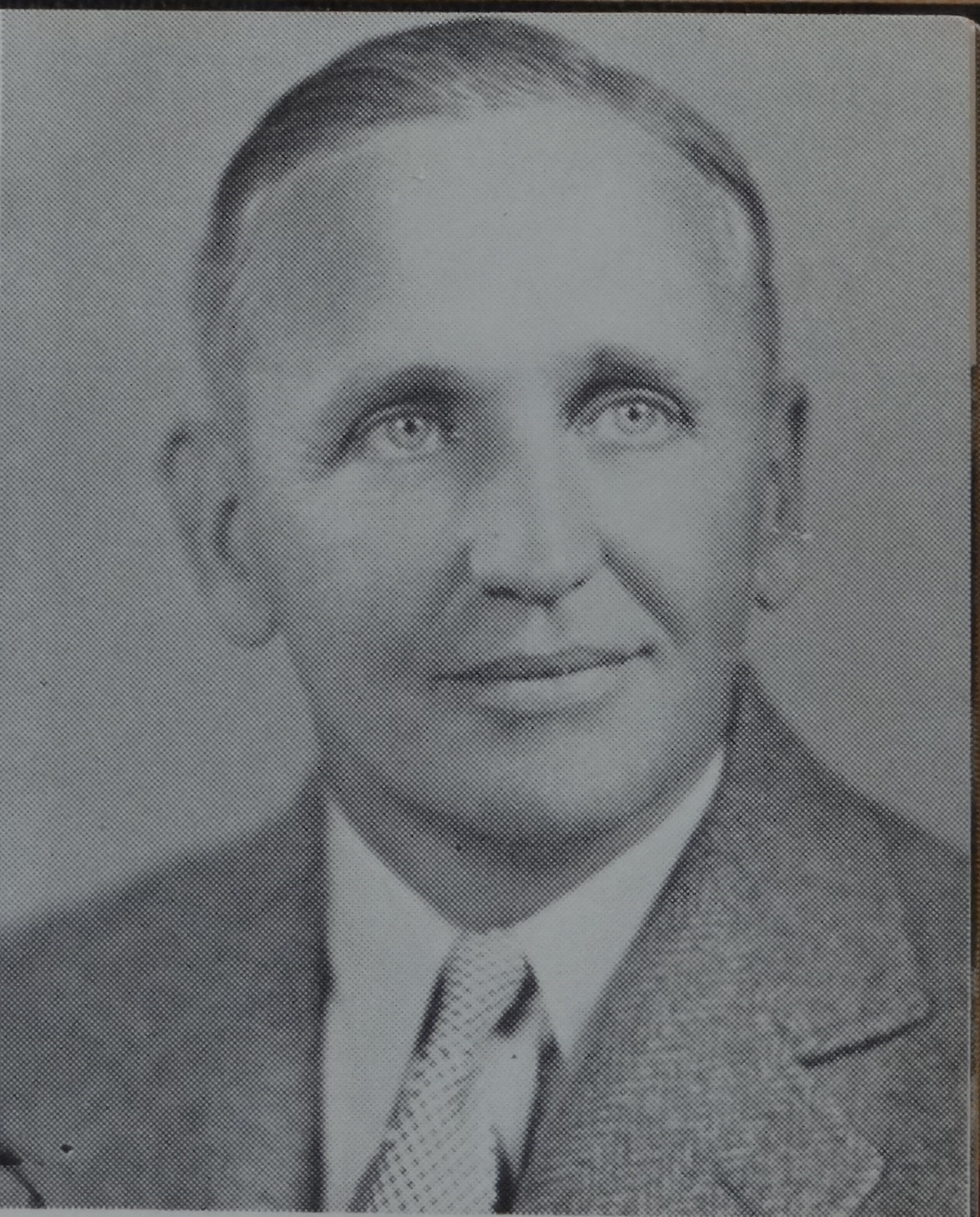

Biographical details
- Born: August 25, 1899; Browns Valley, Minnesota, U.S.
- Died: August 29, 1997 (aged 98); Gainesville, Florida, U.S.

Playing career

Basketball
- 1918–1922: Carleton
- Positions: Halfback (football); Guard (basketball)

Coaching career (HC unless noted)

Basketball
- 1922–1923: Rochester HS
- 1923–1924: Iowa State Teachers (assistant)
- 1924–1930: Carleton
- 1932–1936: River Falls State
- 1936–1943: Dartmouth
- 1944–1946: Dartmouth
- 1946–1948: Michigan
- 1948–1959: Minnesota

Football
- 1923: Iowa State Teachers (assistant)
- c. 1925: Carleton (freshmen)
- 1933–1935: River Falls State

Baseball
- 1924: Iowa State Teachers
- 1925–?: Carleton
- 1933–1936: River Falls State

Administrative career (AD unless noted)
- 1932–1936: River Falls State

Head coaching record
- Overall: 13–6–2 (college football); 421–208 (college basketball); 6–0 (college baseball, Iowa State Teachers only)
- Tournaments: Basketball; 5–4 (NCAA)

Accomplishments and honors

Championships
- Basketball; 3 MCAC (1928–1930); WIAC (1936); 6 EIBL (1938–1943); Big Ten (1948)

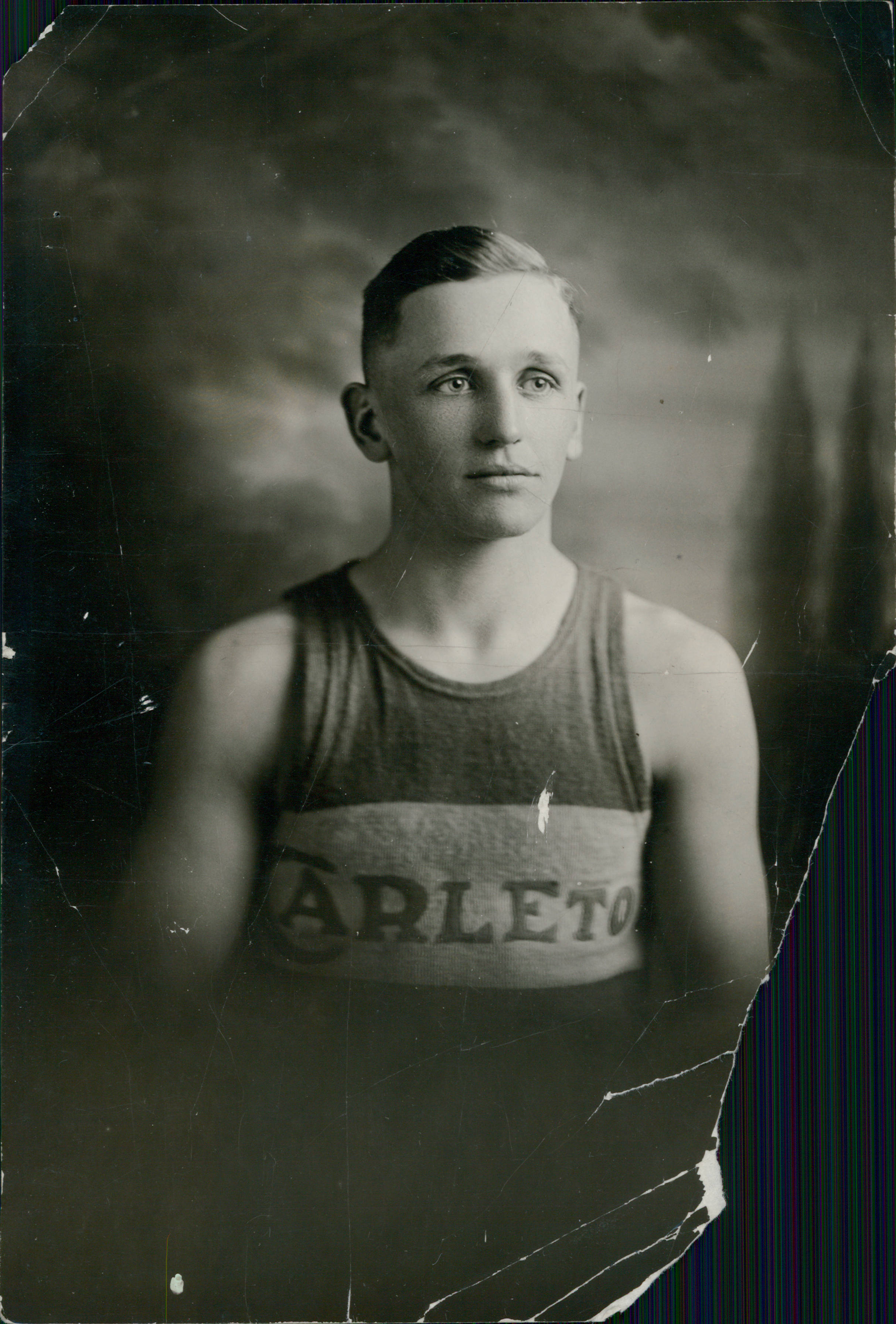
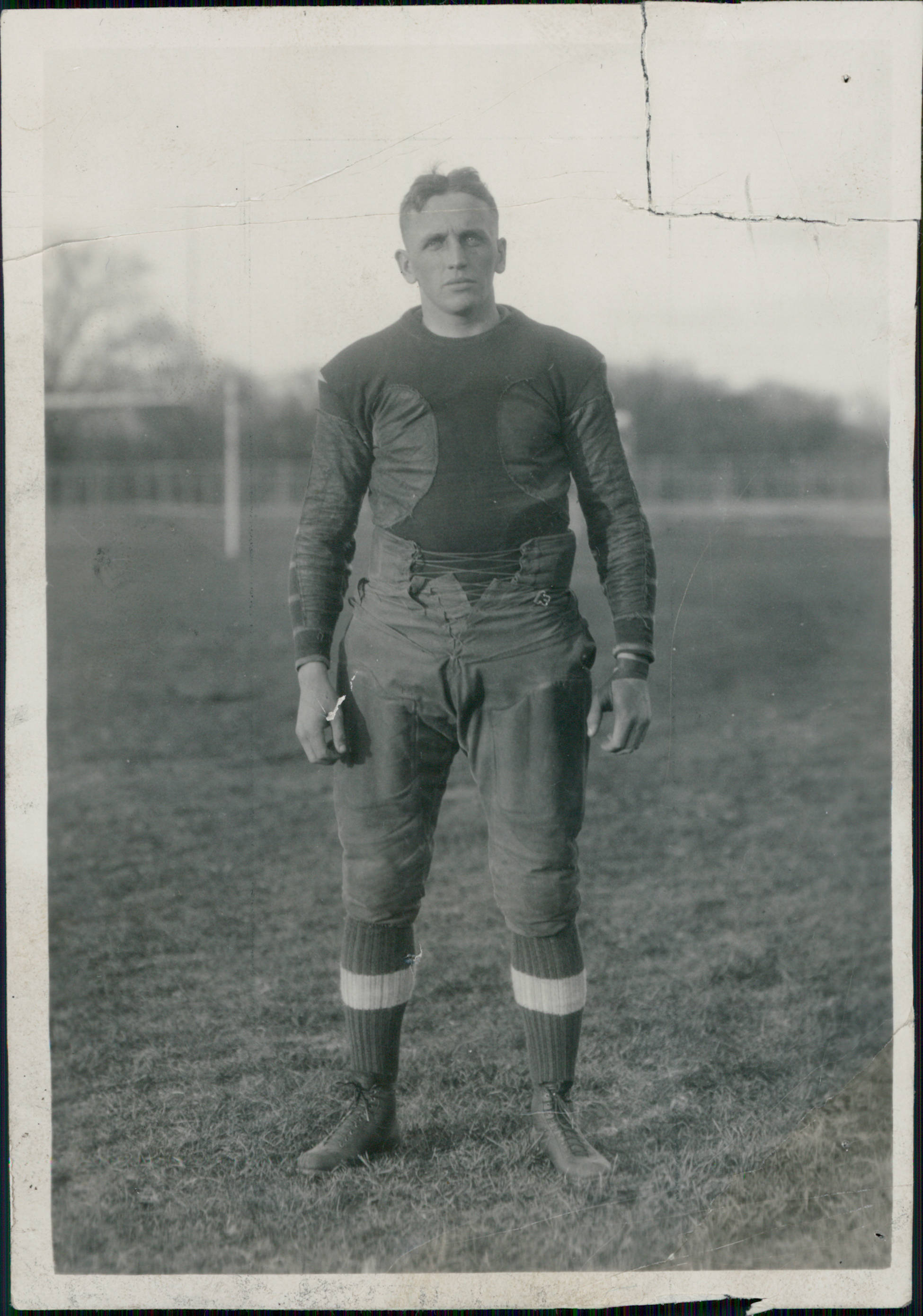
As an athlete at Carleton College

Osborne Bryan Cowles (August 25, 1899 – August 29, 1997) was an American basketball player and coach. He was the head men's basketball coach at Carleton College (1924–1930), River Falls State Teachers College (now University of Wisconsin–River Falls) (1932–1936), Dartmouth College (1936–1946), University of Michigan (1946–1948), and University of Minnesota (1948–1959). He was also the head baseball coach and assistant basketball and football coach at Iowa State Teachers College, now the University of Northern Iowa during 1923–24. In 30 seasons as a collegiate head basketball coach, Cowles compiled a record of 416–189 (.688). His teams competed in the NCAA basketball tournament six times. At the time of his retirement in 1959, Cowles ranked among the top 15 college basketball coaches of all time by number of games won. He has been inducted into the Helms Foundation Hall of Fame, the Dartmouth "Wearers of the Green," the University of Minnesota "M" Club Hall of Fame, the Carleton College Hall of Fame, and the University of Wisconsin-River Falls Athletics Hall of Fame.

== Early years ==
Cowles was born in Browns Valley, Minnesota. He was the son of Augustus and Elizabeth (Fowler) Cowles. His father was a druggist and farmer in Traverse County, Minnesota, near the South Dakota border. In his draft registration card completed in September 1918, Cowles indicated that he was living at Browns Valley and working for his father as a farm laborer.

== Carleton ==
Cowles attended Carleton College in Northfield, Minnesota. While at Carleton, Cowles played basketball, baseball and football, winning a total of 11 varsity letters. He was an All-State guard for the basketball team and was selected as the team captain during the 1920–21 and 1921–22 seasons. After Cowles scored 21 points against Coe College in 1921, The Coe College Cosmos praised his "whirlwind tactics in handling the ball" and noted, "Cowles is quick as a cat, powerful and heady—the personification of speed." During the two years in which Cowles was the captain, the Carleton basketball team compiled records of 13–4 and 14–2. He was also selected as an All-State halfback while playing for the Carleton football team.

== Coaching career ==
=== Rochester High School ===
After graduating from Carleton in 1922, Cowles began a coaching career that lasted nearly 40 years. He began his coaching career as a high school coach in Rochester, Minnesota, during the 1922–23 season. In his first year as a coach, his Rochester team advanced to the semi-finals of the Minnesota state high school basketball tournament. Interviewed in January 1923, Cowles declared that basketball was the greatest sport in America because more take part in the game than any other game. As proof, Cowles noted that 175 men and boys and about 60 women were regularly playing basketball in Rochester.

=== Iowa State Teachers ===
During the 1923–24 academic year, Cowles coached football, baseball and basketball at Iowa State Teachers College—now known as Northern Iowa University. He was an assistant coach to the L. L. Mendenhall for the football and basketball teams and the head coach of the baseball team. In his one year as head baseball coach, he "turned out a team that won the Iowa conference championship" in 1924.

=== Carleton ===
In September 1924, Cowles accepted a position as the head basketball and baseball coach at his alma mater, Carleton College. He served as the head basketball and baseball coach from 1924 to 1930. In six years as head basketball coach, Cowles' teams compiled a 67–24 record for a .720 winning percentage. They won Midwest Conference championships in three of Cowles' six seasons as head coach. At one point, Cowles' Carleton teams won 32 consecutive games on their home court and 48 out of 52 games overall.

In April 1930, Cowles quit his coaching position at Carleton to accept a position with a Minneapolis bond firm. At the time of the 1930 United States Census, Osborne was living in Northfield, Minnesota and listed his occupation as bond salesman.

=== River Falls State ===
In November 1932, Cowles was hired by the River Falls State Teachers College, now known as the University of Wisconsin–River Falls. Cowles was the athletic director and head baseball, football and basketball coach at River Falls from 1932 to 1936. His 1936 River Falls basketball team won a conference title. He compiled a 32–28 record in three years as the basketball coach at River Falls.

=== Dartmouth and Navy ===
In March 1936, Cowles was hired as the head basketball coach at Dartmouth College. Fritz Crisler, who was the football and basketball coach at Princeton University at the time, had seen Cowles' teams at Carleton College and recommended Cowles for the coaching position at Dartmouth. (Ten years later, Crisler hired Cowles as Michigan's basketball coach.) Cowles was also the head coach of the freshman football team at Dartmouth.

Cowles was the head coach of the Dartmouth basketball team from 1936 to 1943 and 1944 to 1946. In his eight seasons as head coach, Dartmouth's basketball teams won the Ivy League championship seven times and finished in second place the other year. He compiled a record of 144–47 (.754) at Dartmouth. Dartmouth also advanced to the NCAA basketball tournament four consecutive years during his tenure from 1941 to 1944.

In March 1942, Cowles led Dartmouth to a 47–28 victory over Kentucky to win the East Championship, and the team advanced to the 1942 NCAA basketball tournament title game against Stanford at Kansas City, Missouri. The championship game pitted Cowles against Stanford coach, Everett Dean, who had coached Cowles at Carleton College. Dean recalled prior to the championship game that Cowles was "one of the best guards to play under me." Dartmouth lost to Stanford in the championship game 53–38.

In March 1943, Cowles stepped down from his coaching position due to service in the United States Navy. He held the rank of lieutenant during World War II, serving with the Naval Aviation Selection Board. In March 1944, while Cowles was fulfilling his military obligation, his Dartmouth basketball team returned to the NCAA championship game, losing a close game to Utah, 42–40, in overtime.

After 22 months of service, Cowles received his honorable discharge from the Navy in December 1944 and returned to his head coaching duties at Dartmouth in January 1945. In February 1946, Cowles led Dartmouth to its eight Ivy League basketball championship in nine years with a 47–27 victory over Columbia.

=== Michigan ===
In August 1946, Cowles was hired as the head basketball coach at the University of Michigan, succeeding Bennie Oosterbaan. Upon hiring Cowles, Michigan's athletic director Fritz Crisler said, "In recommending Mr. Cowles, I feel that we are very fortunate. He is absolutely in my estimation the best possible man for the position we could select." In his first year at Michigan, he led the team to a 12–8 record. The following year, he led the 1947–48 Michigan Wolverines to a 16–6 (.727) record. The team won the 1948 Big Ten Conference championship. In February 1948, as Cowles led the Wolverines to a turnaround season, the press focused on Cowles' success in Ann Arbor. The Toledo Blade sports editor wrote:

"Win, lose or draw in the red hot scramble for the Western Conference basketball title, the University of Michigan team has done so surprisingly well this season that Coach Ozzie Cowles is getting as much applause on the Ann Arbor campus as came to Fritz Crisler after the football season. Michigan for years has prided itself on its well rounded athletic program. ... But until Cowles was lured away from Dartmouth to take charge of the Wolverine cagers, basketball wasn't going too well at Michigan. ... Those who should know what they are talking about say that Michigan is winning this year, not because of any great supply of sterling cage performers, but because of the personality and coaching finesse of Cowles."

Following the 1947–48 season, Cowles received the Coach of the Year award at Michigan.

=== Minnesota ===
In May 1948, Minnesota hired Cowles away from Michigan after a snowstorm prevented Minnesota from hiring the now-legendary John Wooden. He coached the Gophers from 1948 through 1959. In his first season at Minnesota, Cowles led the basketball team to an 18–3 record (.857) and a No. 6 ranking in the final AP poll. He compiled a 148–93 record at Minnesota, though "he was never able to find the championship touch that he worked at Dartmouth, Michigan and earlier at Carleton College." Despite the lack of championships, his tenure at Minnesota has been described by some as the "golden age" of the program.

At Minnesota, Cowles had a defensive focus, taught "control basketball" and was "often criticized by Big Ten opponents for using a deliberate style of play." In 1957, he was in the minority in opposing the introduction of a 30- or 24-second rule to college basketball, arguing that "it makes teams take shots they shouldn't take." When Cowles introduced his control-oriented game at Minnesota in 1949, the style was deemed anachronistic and became "the main topic of conversation among net fans in the midlands." In February 1949, the Long Beach Press Telegram ran a lengthy feature story on Cowles' strategy. The article noted:

"Ossie Cowles has put the brakes on basketball in the Western Conference, and speculation is rife over whether the hardwood sport has seen the limit, for the time being at least, of the 'fire department' style which sent scores soaring and left fans, players and coaches breathless. Coach Cowles finds himself in a storm center."

Earlier, Cowles had been an outspoken opponent of a 1950 rule limiting a fouled player to one free-throw if he was not fouled in the act of shooting. Believing the odds were better, Cowles ordered his team to refuse all free-throws (and instead opt for a jump ball as was permitted under the rules at that time) in a game against Michigan State. Despite losing to Michigan State and being "hooted" by fans, Cowles ordered his players to follow the same strategy in several additional games.

In his final two seasons at Minnesota, the program had losing records of 9–12 in 1957–58 and 8–14 in 1958–59. In March 1959, "amid growing anti-Cowles talk among Gopher fans," Cowles resigned his head coaching job at Minnesota. He was age 57 when he retired.

In 30 seasons as a collegiate head basketball coach, Cowles compiled a record of 416–189 (.688). At the time of his retirement, he ranked among the top 15 coaches in college basketball history, trailing only Adolph Rupp, Phog Allen, Edgar Diddle, Henry Iba, Slats Gill, Fred Enke, Tony Hinkle, Harold Anderson, Jack Friel, Taps Gallagher and Nibs Price.

== Family, honors and later years ==
Cowles was married to Luella Elizabeth Kaus in Saint Paul, Minnesota, at Peoples Church on March 12, 1922. They had two children, Roxanne and David Cowles. Following the death of his first wife, Cowles was remarried to Edris Cowles. Cowles reportedly "built up considerable wealth" through business interests outside basketball, including a large farm in western Minnesota and an ownership interest in a chain of formal wear stores.

After retiring from coaching, Cowles moved to El Paso, Texas, where he lived throughout the 1960s and 1970s. He was a member of Quinn and Co. in El Paso and was active in the exploration and production of natural gas. He also became a regular at Texas Western College (now known as University of Texas at El Paso) basketball games.

Cowles has been inducted into the Helms Foundation Hall of Fame, the Dartmouth "Wearers of the Green," the University of Minnesota M Club Hall of Fame, the Carleton College Hall of Fame, and the University of Wisconsin-River Falls Athletics Hall of Fame. He was also honored by the National Association of Basketball Coaches as the fifth recipient of the Hillyard Golden Anniversary Award in 1983, and with the Metropolitan Award in 1993.

In August 1997, Cowles died at Gainesville, Florida, at age 98. He was preceded in death by wives, Louella and Edris, and his son, David. He was survived by his third wife, Georgia, daughter, Roxanne, and step-daughter, Janet Gharrity.

== Head coaching record ==
=== College football ===
Year	Team	Overall	Conference	Standing	Bowl/playoffs
River Falls State Falcons (Wisconsin State Teachers College Conference) (1933–1935)
1933	River Falls State	4–1–1	2–1–1	T–3rd	
1934	River Falls State	5–3	3–1	2nd (Northern)	
1935	River Falls State	4–2–1	2–1–1	2nd (Northern)	
River Falls State:		13–6–2	7–3–2		
Total:		13–6–2			

=== College basketball ===
Record table
Season	Team	Overall	Conference	Standing	Postseason
Carleton Knights (Midwest Collegiate Athletic Conference) (1924–1930)
1924–25	Carleton	9–8	2–3	T–6th	
1925–26	Carleton	7–7	3–2	5th	
1926–27	Carleton	12–5	5–2	4th	
1927–28	Carleton	13–1	7–1	1st	
1928–29	Carleton	12–3	8–0	1st	
1929–30	Carleton	14–2	8–0	1st	
Carleton:		67–26 (.713)	33–8 (.805)		
River Falls State Falcons (Wisconsin State Teachers College Conference) (1932–1936)
1932–33	River Falls State	4–7			
1933–34	River Falls State	9–7			
1934–35	River Falls State	10–7			
1935–36	River Falls State	9–7		T–1st	
River Falls State:		32–28 (.533)			
Dartmouth Big Green (Eastern Intercollegiate Basketball League) (1936–1945)
1936–37	Dartmouth	14–8	8–4	2nd	
1937–38	Dartmouth	20–5	8–4	1st	
1938–39	Dartmouth	18–5	10–2	1st	
1939–40	Dartmouth	15–6	11–1	1st	
1940–41	Dartmouth	19–5	10–2	1st	NCAA Regional Third Place
1941–42	Dartmouth	22–4	10–2	1st	NCAA Runner-up
1942–43	Dartmouth	20–3	11–1	1st	NCAA Regional Third Place
1944–45	Dartmouth	6–8	2–4	3rd	
Dartmouth:		147–47 (.758)	70–20 (.778)		
Michigan Wolverines (Big Ten Conference) (1946–1948)
1946–47	Michigan	12–8	6–6	5th	
1947–48	Michigan	16–6	10–2	1st	NCAA Regional Third Place
Michigan:		28–14 (.667)	16–8 (.667)		
Minnesota Golden Gophers (Big Ten Conference) (1948–1959)
1948–49	Minnesota	18–3	9–3	2nd	
1949–50	Minnesota	13–9	4–8	T–6th	
1950–51	Minnesota	13–9	7–7	T–4th	
1951–52	Minnesota	15–7	10–4	3rd	
1952–53	Minnesota	14–8	11–7	T–3rd	
1953–54	Minnesota	17–5	10–4	T–3rd	
1954–55	Minnesota	15–7	10–4	T–2nd	
1955–56	Minnesota	11–11	6–8	T–6th	
1956–57	Minnesota	14–8	9–5	T–3rd	
1957–58	Minnesota	9–12	5–9	T–8th	
1958–59	Minnesota	8–14	5–9	9th	
Minnesota:		147–93 (.613)	86–68 (.558)		
Total:		421–208 (.669)			
National champion Postseason invitational champion Conference regular season champion Conference regular season and conference tournament champion Division regular season champion Division regular season and conference tournament champion Conference tournament champion

== See also ==
- List of NCAA Division I men's basketball tournament Final Four appearances by coach
