= 1941–42 Kentucky Wildcats men's basketball team =

1941–42 season of University of Kentucky men's basketball team

1941–42 Kentucky Wildcats men's basketball

SEC regular season and tournament champions

NCAA tournament, Final Four
- Conference: Southeastern Conference
- Record: 19–6 (6–2 SEC)
- Head coach: Adolph Rupp (12th season)
- Home arena: Memorial Coliseum

The 1941–42 Kentucky Wildcats men's basketball team represented University of Kentucky during the 1941–42 season. The team finished the season with 19–6 overall record and reached the first Final Four in the program's history.

== Schedule and results ==
Date time, TV	Rank^{#}	Opponent^{#}	Result	Record	Site city, state
Regular season
SEC tournament
NCAA tournament
Mar 20, 1942*		vs. Illinois; East Regional Semifinal – Elite Eight	W 46–44	19–5	Tulane Gym; New Orleans, Louisiana
Mar 21, 1942*		vs. Dartmouth; East Regional Final / National Semifinal – Final Four	L 28–47	19–6	Tulane Gym; New Orleans, Louisiana
*Non-conference game. ^{#}Rankings from AP Poll. (#) Tournament seedings in parentheses. E=East.
