= 1982–83 Arizona Wildcats men's basketball team =

American college basketball season

1982–83 Arizona Wildcats men's basketball
- Conference: Pacific-10
- Record: 4–24 (1–17 Pac-10)
- Head coach: Ben Lindsey (1st season)
- Assistant coach: Ricky Byrdsong (1st season)
- Home arena: McKale Center (Capacity: 14,545)

1982–83 Pacific-10 Conference men's basketball standings
	Conf.				Overall
Team	W		L	PCT	W		L	PCT
No. 7 UCLA	15	–	3	.833	23	–	6	.793
Washington State	14	–	4	.778	23	–	7	.767
Oregon State	12	–	6	.667	20	–	11	.645
Arizona State	12	–	6	.667	19	–	14	.576
USC	11	–	7	.611	17	–	11	.607
Washington	7	–	11	.389	16	–	15	.516
California	7	–	11	.389	14	–	14	.500
Stanford	6	–	12	.333	14	–	14	.500
Oregon	5	–	13	.278	9	–	18	.333
Arizona	1	–	17	.056	4	–	24	.143
As of April 15, 1983; Rankings from AP Poll

The 1982–83 Arizona Wildcats men's basketball team represented the University of Arizona during the 1982–83 NCAA Division I men's basketball season. The team was led by first-year head coach Ben Lindsey, who was hired to replace Fred Snowden following his resignation at the conclusion of the previous season.

The Wildcats played their home games on campus at the McKale Center in Tucson, and were a member of the Pacific-10 Conference. The Wildcats finished with an overall record of 4–24 (1–17 in Pac-10, tenth place), their worst record since going 4–22 in 1958–59. Following the season, Ben Lindsey was fired and replaced by Iowa head coach Lute Olson.

== Roster ==
1982–83 Arizona Wildcats men's basketball team
Players
Coaches

Pos.	#	Name	Height	Weight	Year	Previous school	Hometown
G	10	Brock Brunkhorst	6 ft 2 in (1.88 m)	—	So	East HS	Phoenix, AZ
G	12	Puntus Wilson	6 ft 3 in (1.91 m)	—	Jr		Dallas, TX
G	14	Ken Ensor	6 ft 4 in (1.93 m)	—	Jr	William Chrisman HS	Independence, MO
G	20	Troy Cooke	6 ft 5 in (1.96 m)	—	Jr	Flowing Wells HS	Tucson, AZ
G/F	21	Keith Jackson	6 ft 5 in (1.96 m)	—	So	Willow Run HS	Ypsilanti, MI
G	22	Gregg Scott	6 ft 2 in (1.88 m)	—	Fr	El Camino Real HS	Torrance, CA
G/F	24	David Haskin	6 ft 5 in (1.96 m)	—	Fr	Sahuaro HS	Tucson, AZ
F/C	31	Frank Smith	6 ft 10 in (2.08 m)	—	Sr	Emerson HS	Gary, IN
G/F	33	Todd Porter	6 ft 5 in (1.96 m)	—	Fr	Lincoln HS	East St. Louis, IL
G	34	Harvey Thompson	6 ft 4 in (1.93 m)	—	Jr	Cholla HS	Tucson, AZ
F	35	Donald Mellon	6 ft 5 in (1.96 m)	—	Sr	Northwestern HS	Detroit, MI
F/C	41	Jack Magno	6 ft 8 in (2.03 m)	—	Sr		Boulder, CO
F	52	Greg Taylor	6 ft 6 in (1.98 m)	—	Jr	Brophy College Prep.	Phoenix, AZ
F	52	Morgan Taylor	6 ft 7 in (2.01 m)	—	Jr	Northeast HS	Macon, GA
F/C	55	John Belobraydic	6 ft 6 in (1.98 m)	—	Sr	Collinsville HS	Collinsville, IL

Head coach

- Ben Lindsey (Pasadena Nazarene)

Assistant coach(es)

- Ricky Byrdsong (Iowa State)

Legend

- (C) Team captain
- (S) Suspended
- (I) Ineligible
- (W) Walk-on
- Injured
- Current redshirt

== Schedule and results ==
Date time, TV	Rank^{#}	Opponent^{#}	Result	Record	Site (attendance) city, state
Non-conference regular season
November 26, 1982*		at No. 14 Houston; Kettle Classic	L 63–104	0–1	Hofheinz Pavilion; Houston, TX
November 28, 1982*		vs. UTSA; Kettle Classic	L 56–57	0–2	Hofheinz Pavilion; Houston, TX
December 1, 1982*		FIU	W 79–68	1–2	McKale Center; Tucson, AZ
December 4, 1982*		at New Mexico	L 73–101	1–3	The Pit; Albuquerque, NM
December 6, 1982*		at UNLV	L 70–88	1–4	Las Vegas Convention Center; Winchester, NV
December 8, 1982*		at No. 14 Tennessee	L 73–92	1–5	Stokely Athletic Center; Knoxville, TN
December 11, 1982*		Iowa State	L 66–80	1–6	McKale Center; Tucson, AZ
December 20, 1982*		Northern Arizona	W 66–53	2–6	McKale Center; Tucson, AZ
December 23, 1982*		No. 19 San Diego State	W 46–44	3–6	McKale Center; Tucson, AZ
December 27, 1982*		Illinois Wesleyan	L 64–67	3–7	McKale Center; Tucson, AZ
Exhibition
January 3, 1983*		Athletes in Action	L 68–79		McKale Center; Tucson, AZ
Pac-10 regular season
January 6, 1983		USC	L 67–74	3–8 (0–1)	McKale Center; Tucson, AZ
January 8, 1983		No. 6 UCLA; Rivalry	L 58–61	3–9 (0–2)	McKale Center; Tucson, AZ
January 13, 1983		at Washington	L 61–74	3–10 (0–3)	Hec Edmundson Pavilion; Seattle, WA
January 15, 1983		at Washington State	L 64–86	3–11 (0–4)	Beasley Coliseum; Pullman, WA
January 22, 1983		at Arizona State; Rivalry	L 69–82	3–12 (0–5)	ASU Activity Center; Tempe, AZ
January 29, 1983		Oregon State	L 54–72	3–13 (0–6)	McKale Center; Tucson, AZ
January 31, 1983		Oregon	L 84–86	3–14 (0–7)	McKale Center; Tucson, AZ
February 5, 1983		at California	L 57–59	3–15 (0–8)	Harmon Gym; Berkeley, CA
February 7, 1983		at Stanford	L 69–86	3–16 (0–9)	Maples Pavilion; Stanford, CA
February 10, 1983		Washington State	L 65–75	3–17 (0–10)	McKale Center; Tucson, AZ
February 12, 1983		Washington	L 72–80	3–18 (0–11)	McKale Center; Tucson, AZ
February 19, 1983		Arizona State; Rivalry	L 70–77	3–19 (0–12)	McKale Center; Tucson, AZ
February 24, 1983		Oregon	L 57–63 ^{OT}	3–20 (0–13)	McArthur Court; Eugene, OR
February 26, 1983		Oregon State	L 56–81	3–21 (0–14)	Gill Coliseum; Corvallis, OR
March 3, 1983		Stanford	W 74–73	4–21 (1–14)	McKale Center; Tucson, AZ
March 5, 1983		California	L 59–84	4–22 (1–15)	McKale Center; Tucson, AZ
March 10, 1983		at No. 4 UCLA; Rivalry	L 58–111	4–23 (1–16)	Pauley Pavilion; Los Angeles, CA
March 12, 1983		at USC	L 70–72	4–24 (1–17)	L.A. Sports Arena; Los Angeles, CA
*Non-conference game. ^{#}Rankings from AP Poll. (#) Tournament seedings in parentheses.
