= John Lawther =

American football and basketball coach and professor

Biographical details
- Born: September 19, 1899
- Died: September 21, 1996; Southern Pines, North Carolina, U.S.

Coaching career (HC unless noted)

Football
- 1926–1929: Westminster (PA) (assistant)
- 1931–1933: Westminster (PA)

Basketball
- 1925–1930: Westminster (PA)
- 1931–1935: Westminster (PA)
- 1936–1949: Penn State

Head coaching record
- Overall: 9–18 (football); 313–136 (basketball)
- Tournaments: Basketball; 1–1 (NCAA)

Accomplishments and honors

Awards
- NAIA Hall of Fame; Helms Foundation Hall of Fame

John Dobson Lawther (September 19, 1899 – September 21, 1996) was an American football and basketball coach and professor. He was the head basketball coach of Westminster College from 1925 to 1930 and again from 1931 to 1936 and Pennsylvania State University from 1936 to 1949. Lawther guided Penn State to an appearance in the 1942 NCAA basketball tournament. After leaving coaching, Lawther became a professor and athletic administrator at Penn State and became a fellow of the American College of Sports Medicine.

Lawther was an alumnus of Westminster College and earned a master's degree from Columbia University.

== Head coaching record ==
=== Football ===
Year	Team	Overall	Conference	Standing	Bowl/playoffs
Westminster Titans (Tri-State Conference) (1931–1933)
1931	Westminster	3–6	0–3	5th	
1932	Westminster	4–6	2–2	3rd	
1933	Westminster	2–6	1–2	4th	
Westminster:		9–18	3–7		
Total:		9–18			

=== Basketball ===
Record table
Season	Team	Overall	Conference	Standing	Postseason
Westminster Titans (Independent) (1925–1930)
1925–26	Westminster	1–10 (Note: E. Dwight Dyer coached the first two games of the 1925–26 season before Lawther took over as head coach. Westminster finished the year with an overall record of 2–11.)	0–0		
1926–27	Westminster	12–5			
1927–28	Westminster	17–3			
1928–29	Westminster	15–2			
1929–30	Westminster	19–2			
Westminster Titans (Independent) (1931–1936)
1931–32	Westminster	19–2			
1932–33	Westminster	19–6			
1933–34	Westminster	22–4			
1934–35	Westminster	19–3			
1934–35	Westminster	20–6			
Westminster:		163–43 (.791)			
Penn State Nittany Lions (Eastern Intercollegiate Conference) (1936–1939)
1936–37	Penn State	10–7	6–4	3rd	
1937–38	Penn State	13–5	6–4	2nd	
1938–39	Penn State	13–10	5–5	T–3rd	
Penn State Nittany Lions (Independent) (1939–1949)
1939–40	Penn State	15–8			
1940–41	Penn State	15–5			
1941–42	Penn State	18–3			NCAA Regional Third Place
1942–43	Penn State	15–4			
1943–44	Penn State	8–7			
1944–45	Penn State	10–7			
1945–46	Penn State	7–9			
1946–47	Penn State	10–8			
1947–48	Penn State	9–10			
1948–49	Penn State	7–10			
Penn State:		150–93 (.617)	17–13 (.567)		
Total:		313–136 (.697)			
