= 1982–83 Stanford Cardinal men's basketball team =

American college basketball season

1982–83 Stanford Cardinal men's basketball
- Conference: Pacific 10 Conference
- Record: 14–14 (6–12 Pac-10)
- Head coach: Tom Davis (1st season)
- Assistant coach: Bruce Pearl (1st season)
- Home arena: Maples Pavilion

1982–83 Pacific-10 Conference men's basketball standings
	Conf.				Overall
Team	W		L	PCT	W		L	PCT
No. 7 UCLA	15	–	3	.833	23	–	6	.793
Washington State	14	–	4	.778	23	–	7	.767
Oregon State	12	–	6	.667	20	–	11	.645
Arizona State	12	–	6	.667	19	–	14	.576
USC	11	–	7	.611	17	–	11	.607
Washington	7	–	11	.389	16	–	15	.516
California	7	–	11	.389	14	–	14	.500
Stanford	6	–	12	.333	14	–	14	.500
Oregon	5	–	13	.278	9	–	18	.333
Arizona	1	–	17	.056	4	–	24	.143
As of April 15, 1983; Rankings from AP Poll

The 1982–83 Stanford Cardinal men's basketball team represented Stanford University. The Cardinal, led by first year head coach Tom Davis, played their home games at Maples Pavilion

== Roster ==
1982–83 Stanford Cardinal men's basketball team
Players
Coaches

Pos.	#	Name	Height	Weight	Year	Hometown
G	15	Keith Jones	6 ft 1 in (1.85 m)	175 lb (79 kg)	Sr
F		Johnny Rogers	6 ft 10 in (2.08 m)	215 lb (98 kg)	So
C	44	John Revelli	6 ft 7 in (2.01 m)	—	Jr

Head coach

- Tom Davis

Assistant coach(es)

Legend

- (C) Team captain
- (S) Suspended
- (I) Ineligible
- (W) Walk-on
- Injured
- Current redshirt

== Schedule ==
Date time, TV	Rank^{#}	Opponent^{#}	Result	Record	Site (attendance) city, state
Regular Season
11/27/1982		UC Riverside	W 84-71	1-0	Maples Pavilion; Stanford, CA
11/30/1982		Sonoma State	W 73-42	2-0	Maples Pavilion; Stanford, CA
12/03/1982		Lafayette; Stanford Invitational	W 80-54	3-0	Maples Pavilion; Stanford, CA
12/04/1982		Temple; Stanford Invitational	W 77-70	4-0	Maples Pavilion; Stanford, CA
12/09/1982		Saint Mary's	W 81-77	5-0	Maples Pavilion; Stanford, CA
12/11/1982		Chico State	L 78-82	5-1	Maples Pavilion; Stanford, CA
12/12/1982		Cal State Dominguez Hills	W 72-54	6-1	Maples Pavilion; Stanford, CA
12/21/1982		at Harvard	W 81-77	7-1	Lavietes Pavilion; Boston, MA
12/23/1982		at Rutgers	L 63-70	7-2	Louis Brown Athletic Center; Piscataway, NJ
12/28/1982		Brown	W 88-71	8-2	Maples Pavilion; Stanford, CA
1/6/1983		Oregon State	L 53-62	8-3	Gill Coliseum; Corvallis, OR
1/8/1983		at Oregon	W 88-71	9-3	Matthew Knight Arena; Corvallis, OR
1/17/1983		at California	L 61-75	9-4	Haas Pavilion; Berkeley, CA
1/20/1983		Southern California	W 92-74	10-4	Maples Pavilion; Stanford, CA
1/22/1983		No. 1 UCLA	L 87-101	10-5	Maples Pavilion; Stanford, CA
1/27/1983		at Washington State	L 65-84	10-6	Alaska Airlines Arena; Seattle, WA
1/29/1983		at Washington State	L 63-67	10-7	Alaska Airlines Arena; Pullman, WA
2/5/1983		Arizona State	W 86-80	11-7	Maples Pavilion; Stanford, CA
2/7/1983		Arizona	W 86-69	12-7	Maples Pavilion; Stanford, CA
2/12/1983		California	L 64-66	12-8	Maples Pavilion; Stanford, CA
2/17/1983		at No. 10 UCLA	L 86-99	12-9	Pauley Pavilion; Los Angeles, CA
2/19/1983		at Southern California	L 76-90	12-10	Galen Center; Los Angeles, CA
2/24/1983		Washington State	L 69-79	12-11	Maples Pavilion; Stanford, CA
2/26/1983		at Washington	W 77-73	13-11	Maples Pavilion; Stanford, CA
3/3/1983		at Arizona	L 73-74	13-12	McKale Center; Tucson, AZ
3/5/1983		at Arizona State	L 72-76	13-13	Wells Fargo Arena; Tempe, AZ
3/10/1983		Oregon	L 73-74	13-14	Maples Pavilion; Stanford, CA
3/12/1983		Oregon State	W 88-75	14-14	Maples Pavilion; Stanford, CA
*Non-conference game. ^{#}Rankings from AP Poll. (#) Tournament seedings in parentheses. All times are in Pacific Time. (#) during NIT is seed within region.
