= 1941–42 Dartmouth Indians men's basketball team =

American college basketball season

1941–42 Dartmouth Big Green men's basketball

NCAA tournament, Runner-up EIBL champions

National Championship Game, L 38-53 vs. Stanford
- Conference: Eastern Intercollegiate Basketball League
- Record: 22–4 (10–2 EIBL)
- Head coach: Ozzie Cowles (6th season)
- Home arena: Alumni Gym

1941–42 Eastern Intercollegiate Basketball League standings
	Conf.				Overall
Team	W		L	PCT	W		L	PCT
Dartmouth	10	–	2	.833	22	–	4	.846
Princeton	10	–	2	.833	16	–	5	.762
Cornell	7	–	5	.583	9	–	12	.429
Pennsylvania	5	–	7	.417	9	–	9	.500
Harvard	5	–	7	.417	8	–	16	.333
Yale	3	–	9	.250	7	–	12	.368
Columbia	2	–	10	.167	2	–	13	.133

The 1941–42 Dartmouth Indians men's basketball team represented Dartmouth College during the 1941–42 NCAA men's basketball season. The team, led by head coach Ozzie Cowles, played their home games at Alumni Gym and were members of the Eastern Intercollegiate Basketball League (EIBL).

They finished the season 22–4, 10–2 in EIBL play to tie for the league title. Dartmouth was one of eight teams to receive an invitation to the NCAA tournament where they finished runner-up.

== Roster ==
1941–42 Dartmouth Big Green men's basketball team
Players
Coaches

Pos.	#	Name	Height	Weight	Year	Hometown
G		George Munroe	5 ft 11 in (1.8 m)	165 lb (75 kg)	Jr	Joliet Township	Joliet, Illinois
F/C		Jim Olsen	6 ft 6 in (1.98 m)	200 lb (91 kg)	Jr	Glenbard West	Glen Ellyn, Illinois

Head coach

- Ozzie Cowles

Assistant coach(es)

Legend

- (C) Team captain
- (S) Suspended
- (I) Ineligible
- (W) Walk-on
- Injured
- Current redshirt

== Schedule ==
Date time, TV	Opponent	Result	Record	Site (attendance) city, state
Regular season
NCAA tournament
Mar 20, 1942*	vs. Penn State; East Regional Semifinal – Elite Eight	W 44–39	21–3	Tulane Gymnasium; New Orleans, Louisiana
Mar 21, 1942*	vs. Kentucky; East Regional Final / National Semifinal – Final Four	W 47–28	22–3	Tulane Gymnasium; New Orleans, Louisiana
Mar 28, 1942*	vs. Stanford; NCAA Championship game	L 38–53	22–4	Municipal Auditorium; Kansas City, Missouri
*Non-conference game. ^{#}Rankings from AP Poll. (#) Tournament seedings in parentheses. All times are in Eastern Time.
