= Stanford Cardinal men's basketball =

American college basketball team

2026–27 Stanford Cardinal men's basketball team
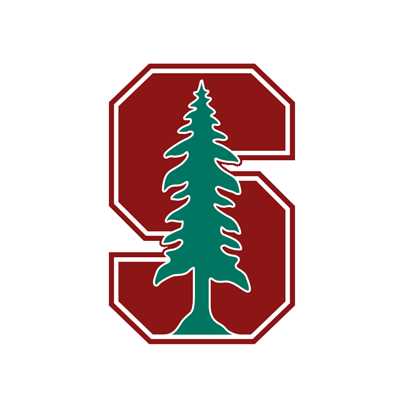
- University: Stanford University
- First season: 1913–14; 113 years ago
- Athletic director: John Donahoe
- Head coach: Kyle Smith; 3rd season, 41–27 (.603)
- Location: Stanford, California
- Arena: Maples Pavilion (capacity: 7,233)
- NCAA division: Division I
- Conference: ACC
- Nickname: Cardinal
- Colors: Cardinal and white
- Student section: The Red Zone
- All-time record: 1,648–1,268 (.565)
- NCAA tournament record: 23–16 (.590)

NCAA Division I tournament champions
- 1942
Other NCAA Division I tournament results
Final Four	1942, 1998
Elite Eight	1942, 1998, 2001
Sweet Sixteen	1997, 1998, 2001, 2008, 2014
Appearances	1942, 1989, 1992, 1995, 1996, 1997, 1998, 1999, 2000, 2001, 2002, 2003, 2004, 2005, 2007, 2008, 2014

Pre-tournament Helms national champions
- 1936–37

NIT champions
- 1991, 2012, 2015

Conference tournament champions
- Pac-12: 2004

Conference regular-season champions
- PCC: 1920, 1921, 1936, 1937, 1938, 1942 Pac-12: 1963, 1999, 2000, 2001, 2004

Conference division champions
- PCC South: 1923, 1936, 1937, 1938, 1941, 1942

Uniforms
Home	Away
Alternate	Alternate

The Stanford Cardinal men's basketball team represents Stanford University in Stanford, California, United States. The school's team currently competes in the Atlantic Coast Conference. They play their home games at Maples Pavilion. Their head coach is Kyle Smith, as he replaced Jerod Haase who was fired on March 14, 2024 after going 126–127 over eight seasons.

Stanford began varsity intercollegiate competition in men's basketball in 1914. The Cardinal have won 13 conference championships (8 in the PCC and 5 in the Pac-10), the last in 2004, and one NCAA championship, in 1942. Stanford was also retroactively recognized as a pre-NCAA tournament national champion for the 1936–37 season by the Helms Athletic Foundation and was retroactively listed as the top team that season by the Premo-Porretta Power Poll. Neither the Helms nor Premo-Porretta designations are recognized by the NCAA as official national championships, despite the NCAA referencing Helms's historical findings. The team last played in the NCAA tournament in 2014.

== Seasons ==
Record table
Season	Coach	Overall	Conference	Standing	Postseason
H. W. Maloney (Independent) (1913–1915)
1913–14	H. W. Maloney	7–5	—	—	—
1914–15	H. W. Maloney	4–5	—	—	—
Maloney:		11–10 (.524)			
E. C. "Squire" Behrens (Independent) (1915–1916)
1915–16	E. C. "Squire" Behrens	2–9	—	—	
Behrens:		2–9			
Russell Wilson (PCC/Cal–Nevada) (1916–1918)
1916–17	Russell Wilson	8–8	0–6	5th	
1917–18	Russell Wilson	11–4	—	3rd	
Wilson:		19–12			
Bob Evans (PCC) (1918–1920)
1918–19	Bob Evans	9–3	0–2	6th	
1919–20	Bob Evans	12–3	8–1	1st	
Evans:		21–6			
Walter D. Powell (PCC) (1920–1921)
1920–21	Walter D. Powell	15–3	8–3	T–1st	
Powell:		15–3			
C. E. Van Gent (PCC) (1921–1922)
1921–22	C. E. Van Gent	8–7	4–6	5th	
Van Gent:		8–7			
Andy Kerr (PCC) (1922–1926)
1922–23	Andy Kerr	12–4	5–3	T–1st (South)	
1923–24	Andy Kerr	10–5	3–5	3rd (South)	
1924–25	Andy Kerr	10–3	1–3	2nd (South)	
1925–26	Andy Kerr	10–6	3–2	2nd (South)	
Kerr:		42–18			
E. P. "Husky" Hunt (PCC) (1926–1930)
1926–27	E. P. "Husky" Hunt	9–9	3–2	2nd (South)	
1927–28	E. P. "Husky" Hunt	8–13	1–8	4th (South)	
1928–29	E. P. "Husky" Hunt	13–6	6–3	2nd (South)	
1929–30	E. P. "Husky" Hunt	10–9	2–7	4th (South)	
Hunt:		40–37			
John Bunn (PCC) (1930–1938)
1930–31	John Bunn	8–9	3–6	4th (South)	
1931–32	John Bunn	6–14	2–9	4th (South)	
1932–33	John Bunn	9–18	3–8	3rd (South)	
1933–34	John Bunn	8–12	5–7	3rd (South)	
1934–35	John Bunn	10–17	4–8	T–3rd (South)	
1935–36	John Bunn	21–8	7–5	T–1st (South)	
1936–37	John Bunn	25–2	10–2	T–1st (South)	retrospective Helms champion
1937–38	John Bunn	21–3	10–2	1st (South)	
Bunn:		108–83			
Everett Dean (PCC) (1938–1951)
1938–39	Everett Dean	16–9	6–6	3rd (South)	
1939–40	Everett Dean	14–9	6–6	2nd (South)	
1940–41	Everett Dean	21–5	10–2	1st (South)	
1941–42	Everett Dean	28–4	11–1	1st (South)	NCAA Champion
1942–43	Everett Dean	10–11	4–4	T–2nd (South)	
1943–44	No team (WWII)				
1944–45	No team (WWII)				
1945–46	Everett Dean	6–18	0–12	4th (South)	
1946–47	Everett Dean	15–16	5–7	3rd (South)	
1947–48	Everett Dean	15–11	3–9	T–3rd (South)	
1948–49	Everett Dean	19–9	5–7	3rd (South)	
1949–50	Everett Dean	11–14	3–9	4th (South)	
1950–51	Everett Dean	12–14	5–7	3rd (South)	
Dean:		167–120			
Robert W. Burnett (PCC) (1951–1954)
1951–52	Robert W. Burnett	19–9	6–6	T–2nd (South)	
1952–53	Robert W. Burnett	6–17	2–10	4th (South)	
1953–54	Robert W. Burnett	13–10	3–9	4th (South)	
Burnett:		38–36			
Howard Dallmar (PCC/AAWU/Pac-8) (1954–1975)
1954–55	Howard Dallmar	16–8	7–5	2nd (South)	
1955–56	Howard Dallmar	18–6	10–6	3rd	
1956–57	Howard Dallmar	11–15	7–9	5th	
1957–58	Howard Dallmar	12–13	7–9	6th	
1958–59	Howard Dallmar	15–9	10–6	T–3rd	
1959–60	Howard Dallmar	11–14	4–7	4th	
1960–61	Howard Dallmar	7–17	3–9	5th	
1961–62	Howard Dallmar	16–6	8–4	2nd	
1962–63	Howard Dallmar	16–9	7–5	T–1st	
1963–64	Howard Dallmar	15–10	9–6	2nd	
1964–65	Howard Dallmar	15–8	9–5	2nd	
1965–66	Howard Dallmar	13–12	8–6	3rd	
1966–67	Howard Dallmar	15–11	7–7	4th	
1967–68	Howard Dallmar	10–15	5–9	T–5th	
1968–69	Howard Dallmar	8–17	4–10	T–7th	
1969–70	Howard Dallmar	5–20	2–12	8th	
1970–71	Howard Dallmar	6–20	2–12	8th	
1971–72	Howard Dallmar	10–15	5–9	6th	
1972–73	Howard Dallmar	14–11	7–7	4th	
1973–74	Howard Dallmar	11–14	5–9	6th	
1974–75	Howard Dallmar	12–14	6–8	T–5th	
Dallmar:		256–264			
Dick DiBiaso (Pac-8/Pac-10) (1975–1982)
1975–76	Dick DiBiaso	11–16	5–9	7th	
1976–77	Dick DiBiaso	11–16	3–11	7th	
1977–78	Dick DiBiaso	13–14	3–11	10th	
1978–79	Dick DiBiaso	12–15	6–12	8th	
1979–80	Dick DiBiaso	7–19	5–13	7th	
1980–81	Dick DiBiaso	9–18	5–13	T–8th	
1981–82	Dick DiBiaso	7–20	2–16	10th	
DiBiaso:		70–118			
Tom Davis (Pac-10) (1982–1986)
1982–83	Tom Davis	14–14	6–12	8th	
1983–84	Tom Davis	19–12	8–10	5th	
1984–85	Tom Davis	11–17	3–15	10th	
1985–86	Tom Davis	14–16	8–10	T–5th	
Davis:		58–59			
Mike Montgomery (Pac-10) (1986–2004)
1986–87	Mike Montgomery	15–13	9–9	6th	
1987–88	Mike Montgomery	21–12	11–7	4th	NIT second round
1988–89	Mike Montgomery	26–7	15–3	2nd	NCAA Division I first round
1989–90	Mike Montgomery	18–12	9–9	6th	NIT first round
1990–91	Mike Montgomery	20–13	8–10	5th	NIT Champion
1991–92	Mike Montgomery	18–11	10–8	4th	NCAA Division I first round
1992–93	Mike Montgomery	7–23	2–16	10th	
1993–94	Mike Montgomery	17–11	10–8	5th	NIT first round
1994–95	Mike Montgomery	20–9	10–8	5th	NCAA Division I second round
1995–96	Mike Montgomery	21–8	12–6	3rd	NCAA Division I second round
1996–97	Mike Montgomery	22–8	12–6	T–2nd	NCAA Division I Sweet Sixteen
1997–98	Mike Montgomery	30–5	15–3	2nd	NCAA Division I Final Four
1998–99	Mike Montgomery	26–7	15–3	1st	NCAA Division I second round
1999–2000	Mike Montgomery	27–4	15–3	T–1st	NCAA Division I second round
2000–01	Mike Montgomery	31–3	16–2	1st	NCAA Division I Elite Eight
2001–02	Mike Montgomery	20–10	12–6	T–2nd	NCAA Division I second round
2002–03	Mike Montgomery	24–9	14–4	2nd	NCAA Division I second round
2003–04	Mike Montgomery	30–2	17–1	1st	NCAA Division I second round
Montgomery:		393–167			
Trent Johnson (Pac-10) (2004–2008)
2004–05	Trent Johnson	18–13	11–7	3rd	NCAA Division I first round
2005–06	Trent Johnson	16–14	11–7	T–4th	NIT second round
2006–07	Trent Johnson	18–13	10–8	6th	NCAA Division I first round
2007–08	Trent Johnson	28–8	13–5	2nd	NCAA Division I Sweet Sixteen
Johnson:		80–48			
Johnny Dawkins (Pac-10/Pac-12) (2008–2016)
2008–09	Johnny Dawkins	20–14	6–12	9th	CBI semifinal
2009–10	Johnny Dawkins	14–18	7–11	T–8th	
2010–11	Johnny Dawkins	15–16	7–11	T–7th	
2011–12	Johnny Dawkins	26–11	10–8	7th	NIT Champion
2012–13	Johnny Dawkins	19–15	9–9	T–6th	NIT second round
2013–14	Johnny Dawkins	23–13	10–8	T–3rd	NCAA Division I Sweet Sixteen
2014–15	Johnny Dawkins	24–13	9–9	T–5th	NIT Champion
2015–16	Johnny Dawkins	15–15	8–10	9th	
Dawkins:		156–115			
Jerod Haase (Pac-12) (2016–2024)
2016–17	Jerod Haase	14–17	6–12	9th	
2017–18	Jerod Haase	19−16	11–7	T–3rd	NIT second round
2018–19	Jerod Haase	15−16	8–10	T–8th	
2019–20	Jerod Haase	20−12	9–9	7th	Postseason cancelled due to the COVID-19 pandemic.
2020–21	Jerod Haase	14−13	10–10	T–6th	
2021–22	Jerod Haase	16−16	8–12	9th	
2022–23	Jerod Haase	14−19	7–13	10th	
2023–24	Jerod Haase	14−18	8–12	T–9th	
Haase:		126–127			
Kyle Smith (ACC) (2024–present)
2024–25	Kyle Smith	21–14	11–9	7th	NIT second round
2025–26	Kyle Smith	20–13	9–9	T–9th	CBC Quarterfinals
Smith:		41–27 (.603)	20–18 (.526)		
Total:		1,654–1,260 (.568)			
National champion Postseason invitational champion Conference regular season champion Conference regular season and conference tournament champion Division regular season champion Division regular season and conference tournament champion Conference tournament champion

== Postseason results ==
=== NCAA tournament results ===
The Cardinal have appeared in 17 NCAA Tournaments, with a combined record of 23–16. They were national champions in 1942, but did not return to the NCAA Tournaments for 47 years, until 1989.

Year	Seed	Round	Opponent	Result
1942		Elite Eight; Final Four; Championship	Rice; Colorado; Dartmouth	W 53–47; W 46–35; W 53–38
1989	3 E	Round of 64	(14) Siena	L 78–80
1992	12 S	Round of 64	(5) Alabama	L 75–80
1995	10 E	Round of 64; Round of 32	(7) Charlotte (2) #7 Massachusetts	W 70–68; L 53–75
1996	9 E	Round of 64; Round of 32	(8) Bradley (1) #1 Massachusetts	W 66–58; L 74–79
1997	6 W	Round of 64; Round of 32; Sweet Sixteen	(11) Oklahoma (3) #9 Wake Forest (2) #2 Utah	W 80–67; W 72–66; L 77–82 ^{OT}
1998	3 M	Round of 64; Round of 32; Sweet Sixteen; Elite Eight; Final Four	(14) College of Charleston (11) Western Michigan (2) #11 Purdue (8) Rhode Island (2 S) #5 Kentucky	W 67–57; W 83–65; W 67–59; W 79–77; L 85–86 ^{OT}
1999	2 W	Round of 64; Round of 32	(15) Alcorn State (10) Gonzaga	W 69–57; L 74–82
2000	1 S	Round of 64; Round of 32	(16) South Carolina State (8) North Carolina	W 84–65; L 53–60
2001	1 W	Round of 64; Round of 32; Sweet Sixteen; Elite Eight	(16) UNC Greensboro (9) Saint Joseph's (5) Cincinnati (3) #11 Maryland	W 88–60; W 90–83; W 78–65; L 73–87
2002	8 M	Round of 64; Round of 32	(9) Western Kentucky (1) #2 Kansas	W 84–68; L 63–86
2003	4 S	Round of 64; Round of 32	(13) San Diego (5) #23 Connecticut	W 77–69; L 74–85
2004	1 W	Round of 64; Round of 32	(16) UTSA (8) Alabama	W 71–45; L 67–70
2005	8 M	Round of 64	(9) Mississippi State	L 70–93
2007	11 S	Round of 64	(6) #16 Louisville	L 58–78
2008	3 S	Round of 64; Round of 32; Sweet Sixteen	(14) Cornell (6) Marquette (2) #7 Texas	W 77–53; W 82–81 ^{OT} L 62–82
2014	10 S	Round of 64; Round of 32; Sweet Sixteen	(7) #17 New Mexico (2) #10 Kansas (11) Dayton	W 58–53; W 60–57; L 72–82

=== NIT results ===
The Cardinal have appeared in ten National Invitation Tournaments (NIT), with a combined record of 20–7. They are three time NIT champions (1991, 2012, 2015).

Year	Round	Opponent	Result
1988	First Round; Second Round	Long Beach State; Arkansas State	W 80–77; L 59–60
1990	First Round	Hawaii	L 57–69
1991	First Round; Second Round; Quarterfinals; Semifinals; Championship	Houston; Wisconsin; Southern Illinois; Massachusetts; Oklahoma	W 93–86; W 80–72; W 78–68; W 78–71; W 78–72
1994	First Round	Gonzaga	L 76–80
2006	Opening Round; First Round	Virginia; Missouri State	W 65–49; L 67–76
2012	First Round; Second Round; Quarterfinals; Semifinals; Championship	Cleveland State; Illinois State; Nevada; Massachusetts; Minnesota	W 76–65; W 92–88 ^{OT} W 84–56; W 84–74; W 75–51
2013	First Round; Second Round	Stephen F. Austin; Alabama	W 58–57; L 54–66
2015	First Round; Second Round; Quarterfinals; Semifinals; Championship	UC Davis; Rhode Island; Vanderbilt; Old Dominion; Miami (FL)	W 77–64; W 74–65; W 78–75; W 67–60; W 66–64 ^{OT}
2018	First Round; Second Round	BYU; Oklahoma State	W 86–83; L 65–71
2025	First Round; Second Round	Cal State Northridge; Kent State	W 87–70; L 75–77

- Conference rules (PCC / Pac-8) disallowed participation until 1973.

=== CBC results ===
The Cardinal have appeared in one College Basketball Crown (CBC). Their record is 0–1.

Year	Round	Opponent	Result
2026	Quarterfinals	West Virginia	L 77–82^{OT}

=== CBI results ===
The Cardinal have appeared in one College Basketball Invitational (CBI). Their record is 2–1.

Year	Round	Opponent	Result
2009	First Round; Quarterfinals; Semifinals	Boise State; Wichita State; Oregon State	W 96–76; W 70–56; L 62–65 ^{OT}

== Record vs. Pac-12 opponents ==
Opponent	Wins	Losses	Pct.	Streak
Arizona	33	73	(.308)	Arizona; 1
Arizona St.	54	44	(.552)	Stanford; 1
California	129	154	(.457)	California; 1
Colorado	11	19	(.367)	Colorado; 6
Oregon	96	58	(.623)	Oregon; 1
Oregon St.	77	78	(.494)	Stanford; 4
UCLA	98	152	(.391)	UCLA; 1
USC	130	131	(.498)	Stanford; 1
Utah	18	25	(.405)	Stanford; 3
Washington	84	76	(.525)	Washington; 1
Washington St.	84	66	(.568)	Washington State; 5

- Records up to date through 2/21/24

== Notable players ==
=== All-Americans ===
Player	Year(s)	Team(s)
Harlow Rothert	1929	Helms (1st)
Hank Luisetti	1936	Consensus First Team – Helms (1st), Converse (1st)
Hank Luisetti	1937	Consensus First Team – Helms (1st), Converse (1st), Omaha World (1st), MSG (1st)
Hank Luisetti	1938	Consensus First Team – Helms (1st), Converse (1st), NEA (1st), MSG (1st)
Art Stoefen	1938	MSG (2nd)
Don Burness	1942	Consensus Second Team – Pic Magazine (1st)
Jim Pollard	1942	Helms (1st)
Rich Kelley	1975	UPI (3rd)
Todd Lichti	1989	Consensus Second Team – AP (3rd), USBWA (2nd), NABC (2nd), UPI (2nd)
Adam Keefe	1992	AP (2nd), NABC (3rd), UPI (3rd)
Brevin Knight	1997	Consensus Second Team – AP (2nd), USBWA (2nd), NABC (2nd)
Mark Madsen	1999	NABC (3rd)
Mark Madsen	2000	AP (3rd), NABC (2nd)
Jason Collins	2001	NABC (3rd)
Casey Jacobsen	2001	Consensus First Team – AP (1st), USBWA (1st), NABC (2nd), Sporting News (1st)
Casey Jacobsen	2002	Consensus Second Team – AP (2nd), USBWA (2nd), NABC (2nd)
Josh Childress	2004	Consensus Second Team –AP (1st), USBWA (2nd), NABC (1st), Sporting News (3rd)
Brook Lopez	2008	AP (3rd), NABC (3rd)
