= 1941–42 Stanford Indians men's basketball team =

American college basketball season

1941–42 Stanford Indians men's basketball

NCAA tournament National champions PCC Champions

National Championship Game, W 53–38 vs. Dartmouth
- Conference: Pacific Coast Conference
- Record: 28–4 (11–1 PCC)
- Head coach: Everett Dean (4th season)

1941–42 Pacific Coast Conference men's basketball standings
	Conf.				Overall
Team	W		L	PCT	W		L	PCT
North
Oregon State	11	–	5	.688	18	–	9	.667
Washington	10	–	6	.625	18	–	7	.720
Washington State	9	–	7	.563	21	–	8	.724
Oregon	7	–	9	.438	12	–	15	.444
Idaho	3	–	13	.188	12	–	16	.429
South
Stanford †	11	–	1	.917	28	–	4	.875
USC	7	–	5	.583	12	–	8	.600
California	4	–	8	.333	11	–	19	.367
UCLA	2	–	10	.167	5	–	18	.217
† Conference playoff series winner

The 1941–42 Stanford Indians (now the Cardinal) men's basketball team won their first and only NCAA basketball championship in 1942. Stanford was also retroactively named the national champion by the Helms Athletic Foundation and was retroactively listed as the top team in the Premo-Porretta Power Poll.

== NCAA basketball tournament ==
- West
  - Stanford 53, Rice 47
- Final Four
  - Stanford 46, Colorado 35
  - Stanford 53, Dartmouth 38

== Awards and honors ==
- Howie Dallmar, NCAA Men's MOP Award
