= Everett Dean =

American basketball and baseball coach (1898–1993)

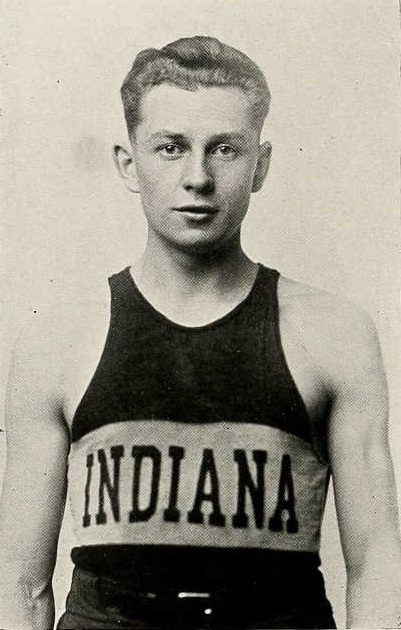
- Dean from The Arbutus 1921

Biographical details
- Born: March 18, 1898; Livonia, Indiana, U.S.
- Died: October 26, 1993 (aged 95)

Playing career

Basketball
- 1918–1921: Indiana

Coaching career (HC unless noted)

Basketball
- 1921–1924: Carleton
- 1924–1938: Indiana
- 1938–1951: Stanford

Baseball
- 1925–1938: Indiana
- 1950–1955: Stanford

Head coaching record
- Overall: 375–217 (basketball); 296–175–12 (baseball)
- Tournaments: Basketball; 3–0 (NCAA)

Accomplishments and honors

Championships
- Basketball; NCAA (1942); MWC (1924); 3 Big Ten (1926, 1928, 1938); PCC (1942)

Awards
- Helms Foundation All-American (1921)
- Basketball Hall of Fame; Inducted in 1966 (profile)
- College Basketball Hall of Fame; Inducted in 2006

Everett Sterling Dean (March 18, 1898 – October 26, 1993) was an American college basketball and baseball coach.

== Biography ==
Born in Livonia, Indiana, Dean played basketball for three years at Indiana University, where he was also a member of the Alpha Tau Omega fraternity, and was named the 1921 Helms Athletic Foundation All-America team. He began his coaching career at Carleton College.

Dean was the head baseball and basketball coach at his alma mater, Indiana University, from 1924 to 1938. In 1938, Dean was named head basketball coach at Stanford University, where he coached the team to the 1942 NCAA championship. Dean was named baseball coach at Stanford in 1950, and led Stanford's baseball team to the 1953 College World Series.

Dean is the only coach named to both the Naismith Basketball Hall of Fame and the College Baseball Hall of Fame. He was inducted into the Indiana Basketball Hall of Fame in 1965. He also has the distinction of being the first basketball All-American from Indiana University.

Dean wrote two books, Indiana Basketball in 1933 and Progressive Basketball in 1942.

His fondness for the local history of his native Washington County, Indiana, led him to push for the creation of the John Hay Center of Salem, Indiana.

== Head coaching record ==
=== Basketball ===
Record table
Season	Team	Overall	Conference	Standing	Postseason
Carleton Knights (Midwest Conference) (1921–1924)
1921–22	Carleton	14–2			
1922–23	Carleton	17–2	4–2	T–2nd	
1923–24	Carleton	15–0		T–1st	
Carleton:		46–4 (.920)			
Indiana Hoosiers (Big Ten Conference) (1924–1938)
1924–25	Indiana	12–5	8–4	2nd	
1925–26	Indiana	12–5	8–4	T–1st	
1926–27	Indiana	13–4	9–3	T–2nd	
1927–28	Indiana	15–2	10–2	T–1st	
1928–29	Indiana	7–10	4–8	8th	
1929–30	Indiana	8–9	7–5	T–3rd	
1930–31	Indiana	9–8	5–7	6th	
1931–32	Indiana	8–10	4–8	7th	
1932–33	Indiana	10–8	6–6	T–5th	
1933–34	Indiana	13–7	6–6	T–5th	
1934–35	Indiana	14–6	8–4	T–4th	
1935–36	Indiana	18–2	11–1	T–1st	
1936–37	Indiana	13–7	6–6	6th	
1937–38	Indiana	10–10	4–8	T–8th	
Indiana:		162–93 (.635)	96–72 (.571)		
Stanford Indians (Pacific Coast Conference) (1938–1951)
1938–39	Stanford	16–9	6–6	3rd (South)	
1939–40	Stanford	14–9	6–6	2nd (South)	
1940–41	Stanford	21–5	10–2	1st (South)	
1941–42	Stanford	28–4	11–1	1st (South)	NCAA Champion
1942–43	Stanford	10–11	4–4	T–2nd (South)	
1943–44	No team—World War II				
1944–45	No team—World War II				
1945–46	Stanford	6–18	0–12	4th (South)	
1946–47	Stanford	15–16	5–7	3rd (South)	
1947–48	Stanford	15–11	3–9	T–3rd (South)	
1948–49	Stanford	19–9	5–7	3rd (South)	
1949–50	Stanford	11–14	3–9	4th (South)	
1950–51	Stanford	12–14	5–7	3rd (South)	
Stanford:		167–120 (.582)	58–70 (.453)		
Total:		375–217 (.633)			
National champion Postseason invitational champion Conference regular season champion Conference regular season and conference tournament champion Division regular season champion Division regular season and conference tournament champion Conference tournament champion

== See also ==
- List of NCAA Division I Men's Final Four appearances by coach
