= 1942 NCAA basketball tournament =

Edition of USA college basketball tournament

- Teams: 8
- Finals site: Municipal Auditorium, Kansas City, Missouri
- Champions: Stanford Indians (1st title, 1st title game, 1st Final Four)
- Runner-up: Dartmouth Indians (1st title game, 1st Final Four)
- Semifinalists: Colorado Buffaloes (1st Final Four); Kentucky Wildcats (1st Final Four)
- Winning coach: Everett Dean (1st title)
- MOP: Howie Dallmar (Stanford)
- Attendance: 24,373
- Top scorers: Chet Palmer, (Rice); Jim Pollard, (Stanford) (43 points)

The 1942 NCAA basketball tournament involved eight schools playing in single-elimination play to determine the national champion of men's NCAA Division I college basketball. The 4th annual edition of the tournament began on March 20, 1942, and ended with the championship game on March 28, at the Municipal Auditorium in Kansas City, Missouri. A total of nine games were played, including a third place game in each region.

Stanford, coached by Everett Dean, won the national title with a 53–38 victory in the final game over Dartmouth, coached by O. B. Cowles. Howie Dallmar of Stanford was named the tournament's Most Outstanding Player. The Indians' success, however, was not to last, as they would not make the tournament again for 47 years, which is currently tied for the eighth-longest drought in NCAA tournament history.

Everett Dean is the only coach to have never lost an NCAA tournament game. Dean was 3–0 in his lone appearance.

Colorado, Dartmouth, Kansas and Rice became the first teams to appear in multiple NCAA Tournaments by appearing in the 1942 tournament.

== Locations ==
The following were the sites selected to host each round of the 1942 tournament:

=== Regionals ===
March 20 and 21
East Regional, Tulane Gym, New Orleans, Louisiana (Host: Tulane University)
West Regional, Municipal Auditorium, Kansas City, Missouri (Host: Missouri Valley Conference)

=== Championship Game ===
March 28
Municipal Auditorium, Kansas City, Missouri (Host: Missouri Valley Conference)

== Teams ==
East Regional - New Orleans
School	Coach	Conference	Record
Dartmouth	Osborne Cowles	EIBL	20–3
Illinois	Doug Mills	Big Ten	18–3
Kentucky	Adolph Rupp	SEC	18–5
Penn State	John Lawther	Independent	17–2

West Regional - Kansas City
School	Coach	Conference	Record
Colorado	Frosty Cox	Mountain States	15–1
Kansas	Phog Allen	Big Six	16–4
Rice	Buster Brannon	Southwest	22–3
Stanford	Everett Dean	Pacific Coast	25–4

== Bracket ==
Quarterfinals
Dartmouth	44
Penn State	39
Kentucky	46
Illinois	44
Stanford	53
Rice	47
Colorado	46
Kansas	44

Semifinals
Dartmouth	47
Kentucky	28
Stanford	46
Colorado	35

Finals
Dartmouth	38
Stanford	53

=== Regional third place ===
East Regional third place
Penn State	41
Illinois	34

West Regional third place
Rice	53
Kansas	55

== See also ==
- 1942 NAIA Basketball Tournament
- 1942 National Invitation Tournament
