= 1941–42 NCAA men's basketball season =

Men's collegiate basketball season

- NCAA Tournament: 1942
- Tournament dates: March 20 – 28, 1942
- National Championship: Municipal Auditorium; Kansas City, Missouri
- NCAA Champions: Stanford Indians
- Helms National Champions: Stanford Indians (retroactive selection in 1944)
- Other champions: West Virginia Mountaineers (NIT)
- Player of the Year (Helms): Stan Modzelewski, Rhode Island Rams (retroactive selection in 1944)

The 1941–42 NCAA men's basketball season began in December 1941, progressed through the regular season and conference tournaments, and concluded with the 1942 NCAA basketball tournament championship game on March 28, 1942, at Municipal Auditorium in Kansas City, Missouri. The Stanford Indians won their first NCAA national championship with a 53–38 victory over the Dartmouth Big Green.

== Season headlines ==
- The Metropolitan New York Conference did not compete during the season. Its members played as independents.
- Dartmouth and Kansas became the first teams to play in more than one NCAA tournament when they appeared in the 1942 tournament.
- In February 1943, the Helms Athletic Foundation retroactively selected Stanford as its national champion for the 1941–42 season.
- In 1995, the Premo-Porretta Power Poll retroactively selected Stanford as its top-ranked team for the 1941–42 season.

== Conference membership changes ==
School	Former conference	New conference
George Washington Colonials	Independent	Southern Conference
Hardin–Simmons Cowboys	Non-major basketball program	Border Conference
Sewanee Tigers	Independent	Non-major basketball program
Washburn Ichabods	Missouri Valley Conference	Non-major basketball program
West Texas State Buffaloes	Non-major basketball program	Border Conference

== Regular season ==
=== Conferences ===
==== Conference winners and tournaments ====
Conference	Regular season winner	Conference player of the year	Conference tournament	Tournament venue (City)	Tournament winner
Big Six Conference	Kansas & Oklahoma	None selected	No Tournament		
Big Ten Conference	Illinois	None selected	No Tournament		
Border Conference	West Texas State	None selected	No Tournament		
Eastern Intercollegiate Basketball League	Dartmouth	None selected	No Tournament		
Metropolitan New York Conference	Did not play as conference				
Missouri Valley Conference	Creighton & Oklahoma A&M	None selected	No Tournament		
Mountain States (Skyline) Conference	Colorado		No Tournament		
New England Conference	Rhode Island State		No Tournament		
Pacific Coast Conference	Oregon State (North); Stanford (South)		No Tournament; Stanford defeated Oregon State in best-of-three conference championship playoff series		
Southeastern Conference	Kentucky	None selected	1942 SEC men's basketball tournament	Jefferson County Armory, (Louisville, Kentucky)	Kentucky
Southern Conference	Duke	None selected	1942 Southern Conference men's basketball tournament	Thompson Gym (Raleigh, North Carolina)	Duke
Southwest Conference	Arkansas & Rice	None selected	No Tournament		

==== Conference standings ====
1941–42 Big Six Conference men's basketball standings
	Conf.				Overall
Team	W		L	PCT	W		L	PCT
Kansas	8	–	2	.800	17	–	5	.773
Oklahoma	8	–	2	.800	11	–	7	.611
Iowa State	5	–	5	.500	11	–	6	.647
Nebraska	4	–	6	.400	6	–	13	.316
Kansas State	3	–	7	.300	8	–	10	.444
Missouri	2	–	8	.200	6	–	12	.333

1941–42 Big Ten Conference men's basketball standings
	Conf.				Overall
Team	W		L	PCT	W		L	PCT
Illinois	13	–	2	.867	18	–	5	.783
Indiana	10	–	5	.667	15	–	6	.714
Wisconsin	10	–	5	.667	14	–	7	.667
Iowa	10	–	5	.667	12	–	8	.600
Minnesota	9	–	6	.600	15	–	6	.714
Purdue	9	–	6	.600	14	–	7	.667
Northwestern	5	–	10	.333	8	–	13	.381
Michigan	5	–	10	.333	6	–	14	.300
Ohio State	4	–	11	.267	6	–	14	.300
Chicago	0	–	15	.000	1	–	20	.048

1941–42 Border Conference men's basketball standings
	Conf.				Overall
Team	W		L	PCT	W		L	PCT
West Texas State	16	–	0	1.000	28	–	3	.903
Texas Tech	12	–	4	.750	16	–	11	.593
Arizona State–Tempe	10	–	6	.625	10	–	10	.500
Arizona State–Flagstaff	8	–	8	.500	11	–	10	.524
Texas State M&M	7	–	9	.438	11	–	11	.500
Arizona	6	–	10	.375	9	–	13	.409
Hardin–Simmons	6	–	10	.375	6	–	10	.375
New Mexico	5	–	11	.313	9	–	13	.409
New Mexico A&M	2	–	14	.125	8	–	18	.308

1941–42 Eastern Intercollegiate Basketball League standings
	Conf.				Overall
Team	W		L	PCT	W		L	PCT
Dartmouth	10	–	2	.833	22	–	4	.846
Princeton	10	–	2	.833	16	–	5	.762
Cornell	7	–	5	.583	9	–	12	.429
Pennsylvania	5	–	7	.417	9	–	9	.500
Harvard	5	–	7	.417	8	–	16	.333
Yale	3	–	9	.250	7	–	12	.368
Columbia	2	–	10	.167	2	–	13	.133

1941–42 Missouri Valley Conference men's basketball standings
	Conf.				Overall
Team	W		L	PCT	W		L	PCT
Creighton	9	–	1	.900	19	–	5	.792
Oklahoma A&M	9	–	1	.900	20	–	6	.769
Washington University	4	–	6	.400	10	–	13	.435
Saint Louis	4	–	6	.400	8	–	12	.400
Tulsa	3	–	7	.300	3	–	13	.188
Drake	1	–	9	.100	2	–	13	.133

1941–42 Mountain States Conference men's basketball standings
	Conf.				Overall
Team	W		L	PCT	W		L	PCT
Colorado	11	–	1	.917	16	–	2	.889
BYU	9	–	3	.750	17	–	3	.850
Wyoming	9	–	3	.750	15	–	5	.750
Utah	7	–	5	.583	13	–	7	.650
Utah State	3	–	9	.250	6	–	10	.375
Denver	2	–	10	.167	4	–	16	.200
Colorado State	1	–	11	.083	3	–	16	.158

1941–42 New England Conference men's basketball standings
	Conf.				Overall
Team	W		L	PCT	W		L	PCT
Rhode Island State	8	–	0	1.000	18	–	4	.818
Connecticut	6	–	2	.750	12	–	5	.706
Northeastern	4	–	4	.500	6	–	9	.400
Maine	2	–	6	.250	7	–	7	.500
New Hampshire	0	–	8	.000	4	–	15	.211

1941–42 Pacific Coast Conference men's basketball standings
	Conf.				Overall
Team	W		L	PCT	W		L	PCT
North
Oregon State	11	–	5	.688	18	–	9	.667
Washington	10	–	6	.625	18	–	7	.720
Washington State	9	–	7	.563	21	–	8	.724
Oregon	7	–	9	.438	12	–	15	.444
Idaho	3	–	13	.188	12	–	16	.429
South
Stanford †	11	–	1	.917	28	–	4	.875
USC	7	–	5	.583	12	–	8	.600
California	4	–	8	.333	11	–	19	.367
UCLA	2	–	10	.167	5	–	18	.217
† Conference playoff series winner

1941–42 Rocky Mountain Conference men's basketball standings
	Conf.				Overall
Team	W		L	PCT	W		L	PCT
Colorado State–Greeley	6	–	2	.750	14	–	11	.560
Montana State	5	–	3	.625	14	–	8	.636
Colorado College	4	–	4	.500	8	–	7	.533
Colorado Mines	3	–	5	.375	6	–	11	.353
Western State (CO)	2	–	6	.250	6	–	12	.333

1941–42 Southeastern Conference men's basketball standings
	Conf.				Overall
Team	W		L	PCT	W		L	PCT
Tennessee	7	–	1	.875	19	–	3	.864
Alabama	13	–	4	.765	18	–	6	.750
Kentucky †	6	–	2	.750	19	–	6	.760
LSU	8	–	3	.727	8	–	7	.533
Auburn	9	–	5	.643	11	–	6	.647
Mississippi State	9	–	6	.600	13	–	7	.650
Georgia	5	–	8	.385	7	–	10	.412
Georgia Tech	4	–	7	.364	8	–	8	.500
Florida	3	–	8	.273	8	–	9	.471
Vanderbilt	3	–	8	.273	7	–	9	.438
Tulane	3	–	9	.250	4	–	12	.250
Ole Miss	3	–	12	.200	4	–	15	.211
† Regular-season championship and SEC Tournament winner

1941–42 Southern Conference men's basketball standings
	Conf.				Overall
Team	W		L	PCT	W		L	PCT
Duke †	15	–	1	.938	22	–	2	.917
George Washington	8	–	3	.727	11	–	9	.550
Wake Forest	13	–	5	.722	16	–	8	.667
North Carolina State	9	–	4	.692	15	–	7	.682
William & Mary	8	–	4	.667	15	–	9	.625
South Carolina	8	–	4	.667	12	–	9	.571
North Carolina	9	–	5	.643	14	–	9	.609
Washington and Lee	7	–	7	.500	10	–	15	.400
Furman	7	–	8	.467	10	–	9	.526
Richmond	4	–	8	.333	9	–	9	.500
Virginia Tech	4	–	8	.333	10	–	10	.500
VMI	5	–	10	.333	7	–	11	.389
Maryland	3	–	8	.273	7	–	15	.318
Davidson	3	–	9	.250	12	–	13	.480
Clemson	2	–	10	.167	3	–	14	.176
The Citadel	1	–	12	.077	2	–	14	.125
† Southern Conference Tournament winner

1941–42 Southwest Conference men's basketball standings
	Conf.				Overall
Team	W		L	PCT	W		L	PCT
Arkansas	10	–	2	.833	19	–	4	.826
Rice	10	–	2	.833	22	–	5	.815
TCU	6	–	6	.500	13	–	10	.565
Baylor	6	–	6	.500	11	–	9	.550
Texas	5	–	7	.417	14	–	9	.609
Texas A&M	4	–	8	.333	8	–	16	.333
SMU	1	–	11	.083	3	–	16	.158

=== Major independents ===
A total of 65 college teams played as major independents. LIU (25–3) had the best winning percentage (.893) and Western Kentucky State (29–5) finished with the most wins.

1941–42 NCAA men's basketball independents standings
	Conf.				Overall
Team	W		L	PCT	W		L	PCT
LIU		–		–	25	–	3	.893
St. Francis (NY)		–		–	16	–	2	.889
Penn State		–		–	18	–	3	.857
Western Kentucky State		–		–	29	–	5	.853
CCNY		–		–	16	–	3	.842
Seton Hall		–		–	16	–	3	.842
West Virginia		–		–	19	–	4	.826
Toledo		–		–	23	–	5	.821
Loyola (Md.)		–		–	18	–	4	.818
Indiana State		–		–	17	–	4	.810
Saint Mary's		–		–	20	–	5	.800
St. John's		–		–	16	–	5	.762
Bradley		–		–	15	–	5	.750
Loyola (Ill.)		–		–	17	–	6	.739
Niagara		–		–	16	–	6	.727
Notre Dame		–		–	16	–	6	.727
Duquesne		–		–	15	–	6	.714
Michigan State Normal		–		–	15	–	6	.714
Syracuse		–		–	15	–	6	.714
Muhlenberg		–		–	17	–	7	.708
Canisius		–		–	12	–	6	.667
Dayton		–		–	12	–	6	.667
St. Joseph's		–		–	12	–	6	.667
Boston University		–		–	9	–	5	.643
Montana State		–		–	14	–	8	.636
Fordham		–		–	12	–	7	.632
NYU		–		–	12	–	7	.632
Army		–		–	10	–	6	.625
Marshall		–		–	15	–	9	.625
Detroit		–		–	13	–	8	.619
Brown		–		–	11	–	7	.611
St. Bonaventure		–		–	12	–	8	.600
Western Michigan		–		–	12	–	8	.600
Butler		–		–	13	–	9	.591
Villanova		–		–	13	–	9	.591
Montana		–		–	14	–	10	.583
San Francisco		–		–	14	–	10	.583
Navy		–		–	8	–	6	.571
Ohio		–		–	12	–	9	.571
Siena		–		–	9	–	7	.563
Kent State		–		–	14	–	11	.560
Brooklyn		–		–	10	–	8	.556
Holy Cross		–		–	5	–	4	.556
Temple		–		–	10	–	8	.556
Xavier		–		–	10	–	8	.556
Washington & Jefferson		–		–	9	–	8	.529
Santa Clara		–		–	10	–	9	.526
La Salle		–		–	12	–	11	.522
Bucknell		–		–	9	–	9	.500
Cincinnati		–		–	10	–	10	.500
Manhattan		–		–	10	–	10	.500
Lehigh		–		–	7	–	8	.467
DePaul		–		–	10	–	12	.455
Georgetown		–		–	9	–	11	.450
Rutgers		–		–	8	–	10	.444
Louisville		–		–	7	–	10	.412
Virginia		–		–	7	–	10	.412
Bowling Green State		–		–	8	–	12	.400
Miami (Ohio)		–		–	6	–	9	.400
Colgate		–		–	5	–	9	.357
Marquette		–		–	6	–	11	.353
Pittsburgh		–		–	5	–	10	.333
Lafayette		–		–	4	–	12	.250
Valparaiso		–		–	4	–	13	.235
Wichita Municipal		–		–	4	–	16	.200

== Post-season tournaments ==
=== NCAA tournament ===
==== Semifinals & final ====
National Semifinals
Dartmouth	47
Kentucky	28
Stanford	46
Colorado	35

National Final
Dartmouth	38
Stanford	53

=== National Invitation tournament ===
==== Semifinals & finals ====
Semifinals
West Virginia	51
Toledo	39
Creighton	36
Western Kentucky State	49

Finals
West Virginia	47
Western Kentucky State	45
Third place
Toledo	46
Creighton	48

== Awards ==
=== Consensus All-American teams ===
Consensus First Team
Player	Class	Team
Price Brookfield	Senior	West Texas State
Bob Davies	Senior	Seton Hall
Bob Kinney	Senior	Rice
John Kotz	Junior	Wisconsin
Andy Phillip	Sophomore	Illinois

Consensus Second Team
Player	Class	Team
Don Burness	Senior	Stanford
Gus Doerner	Senior	Evansville
Bob Doll	Senior	Colorado
John Mandic	Senior	Oregon State
Stan Modzelewski	Senior	Rhode Island State
George Munroe	Junior	Dartmouth

=== Major player of the year awards ===
- Helms Player of the Year: Stan Modzelewski, Rhode Island State

=== Other major awards ===
- NIT/Haggerty Award (Top player in New York City metro area): Jim White, St. John's (retroactive selection in 1944)

== Coaching changes ==
A number of teams changed coaches during the season and after it ended.

Team	Former Coach	Interim Coach	New Coach	Reason
Alabama	Hank Crisp		Paul Burnum	
Arkansas	Glen Rose		Eugene Lambert	
Auburn	Ralph Jordan		Bob Evans	
Bowling Green	Paul Landis		Harold Anderson	
Brown	Tippy Dye		Rip Engle	
Bucknell	Malcolm Musser		John Sitarsky	
Butler	Tony Hinkle		Frank Hedden	
Cincinnati	Clark Ballard		Robert Reuss	
The Citadel	Ben Clemons		Bo Sherman	
Columbia	Paul Mooney		Cliff Battles	
Cornell	Blair Gullion		Speed Wilson	
DePaul	Bill Wendt		Ray Meyer	
Duke	Eddie Cameron		Gerry Gerard	
Florida	Sam J. McAllister		Spurgeon Cherry	
George Washington	Bill Reinhart		Otts Zahn	
Holy Cross	Moose Krause		Hop Riopel	
Idaho	Guy Wicks		James A. Brown	
Iowa	Rollie Williams		Pops Harrison	
Kansas State	Jack Gardner		Chili Cochrane	
Lafayette	Richard Madison		Arthur R. Winters	
Lehigh	Marty Westerman		James Gordon	
Loyola (Ill.)	Lenny Sachs		John Connelly	
LSU	Harry Rabenhorst		Dale Morey	
Maine	William C. Kenyon		Samuel Sezak	
Miami (ohio)	Rip Van Winkle		Blue Foster	
Minnesota	Dave MacMillan		Carl Nordley	
Montana	George Dahlberg		Clyde Carpenter & Ed Chinske	Carpenter and Chinske were co-head coaches.
North Carolina State	Bob Warren		Leroy Jay	
Northeastern	James W. Dunn		Foxy Flumere	
Ole Miss	Chuck Jaskwhich		Edwin Hale	
Rice	Buster Brannon		Joe Davis	
Saint Mary's	Louis Conlan		James Phelan	
San Francisco	Forrest Twogood		Jimmy Needles	
SMU	F. C. Baccus		James Stewart	
Temple	Ernest Messikomer		Josh Cody	Messikomer left to serve in the United States Navy.
Texas	Jack Gray		Bully Gilstrap	Gray left to serve in the Second World War.
Texas A&M	Marty Karow		Manning Smith	
Toledo	Harold Anderson		Burl Friddle	Anderson left to coach Bowling Green.
Tulane	Claude Simons Jr.		Vernon Haynes	
Tulsa	Tex Ryon		Mike Milligan	
USC	Julie Bescos		Ernie Holbrook	
Utah State	Robert Burnett		D. D. Young	
VMI	Jimmy Walker		Allison Hubert	
Wichita Municipal	Jack Sterrett		Melvin J. Binford	
West Virginia	Dyke Raese		Rudy Baric	
Yale	Ken Loeffler		Red Rolfe	
