= 1941–42 Colorado Buffaloes men's basketball team =

American college basketball season

1941–42 Colorado Buffaloes men's basketball

Mountain States Athletic Conference champion

NCAA tournament, Final Four
- Conference: Mountain States Athletic Conference
- Record: 16–2 (11–1 MSAC)
- Head coach: Frosty Cox (7th season)
- Home arena: Balch Fieldhouse

1941–42 Mountain States Conference men's basketball standings
	Conf.				Overall
Team	W		L	PCT	W		L	PCT
Colorado	11	–	1	.917	16	–	2	.889
BYU	9	–	3	.750	17	–	3	.850
Wyoming	9	–	3	.750	15	–	5	.750
Utah	7	–	5	.583	13	–	7	.650
Utah State	3	–	9	.250	6	–	10	.375
Denver	2	–	10	.167	4	–	16	.200
Colorado State	1	–	11	.083	3	–	16	.158

The 1941–42 Colorado Buffaloes Men's basketball team represented the University of Colorado in the 1941–42 NCAA men's basketball season. Led by seventh-year head coach Frosty Cox, the Buffaloes were Big Six Conference champions and made a run to the Final Four of the NCAA tournament. In the National semifinals, Colorado lost to eventual National champion Stanford. The Buffaloes finished the season with a 16–2 record (11–1 MSAC).

== Roster ==
1941–42 Colorado Buffaloes men's basketball team
Players
Coaches

Pos.	#	Name	Height	Weight	Year	Previous school	Hometown
F/C		Bob Doll	6 ft 5 in (1.96 m)	195 lb (88 kg)	Sr	Chaffey HS	Ontario, California
		Leason McCloud	—	—

Head coach

Frosty Cox

Assistant coach(es)

Legend

- (C) Team captain
- (S) Suspended
- (I) Ineligible
- (W) Walk-on
- Injured
- Current redshirt

Roster

== Schedule and results ==
Date time, TV	Rank^{#}	Opponent^{#}	Result	Record	Site city, state
Regular season
Dec 27, 1941*		at Saint Joseph's	W 45–29	1–0	Palestra; Philadelphia, Pennsylvania
Dec 30, 1941*		at St. John's	W 39–33	2–0	Madison Square Garden; New York, New York
Jan 1, 1942*		at St. Bonaventure	W 52–28	3–0	Butler Gym; Allegany, New York
Jan 3, 1942*		at Loyola–Chicago	W 57–43	4–0	Alumni Gym; Chicago, Illinois
Jan 9, 1942		Utah	W 49–39	5–0 (1–0)	Balch Fieldhouse; Boulder, Colorado
Jan 10, 1942		at Denver	W 54–36	6–0 (2–0)	Denver, Colorado
Jan 16, 1942		Utah State	W 49–31	7–0 (3–0)	Balch Fieldhouse; Boulder, Colorado
Jan 17, 1942		at Colorado State	W 79–28	8–0 (4–0)	South College Gymnasium; Fort Collins, Colorado
Jan 24, 1942		Wyoming	W 59–53	9–0 (5–0)	Balch Fieldhouse; Boulder, Colorado
Feb 7, 1942		Colorado State	W 63–27	10–0 (6–0)	Balch Fieldhouse; Boulder, Colorado
Feb 13, 1942		at Utah	W 49–48	11–0 (7–0)	Nielsen Fieldhouse; Salt Lake City, Utah
Feb 14, 1942		at BYU	W 52–49	12–0 (8–0)	Provo, Utah
Feb 21, 1942		Denver	W 59–28	13–0 (9–0)	Balch Fieldhouse; Boulder, Colorado
Feb 28, 1942		BYU	W 52–35	14–0 (10–0)	Balch Fieldhouse; Boulder, Colorado
Mar 3, 1942		at Wyoming	L 39–40	14–1 (10–1)	Laramie, Wyoming
Mar 7, 1942		at Utah State	W 57–46	15–1 (11–1)	George Nelson Fieldhouse; Logan, Utah
NCAA Tournament
Mar 20, 1942*		vs. Kansas; West Regional Semifinal / National Quarterfinal – Elite Eight	W 46–44	16–1	Municipal Auditorium; Kansas City, Missouri
Mar 21, 1942*		vs. Stanford; West Regional Final / National Semifinal – Final Four	L 35–46	16–2	Municipal Auditorium; Kansas City, Missouri
*Non-conference game. ^{#}Rankings from AP Poll. (#) Tournament seedings in parentheses. W=West. All times are in Mountain Time.
