= Frosty Cox =

American basketball player and coach (1908–1962)

Biographical details
- Born: January 22, 1908; Orlando, Oklahoma, U.S.
- Died: May 22, 1962 (aged 54); Missoula, Montana, U.S.

Playing career

Basketball
- 1928–1931: Kansas

Football
- 1928–1930: Kansas
- Positions: Guard (basketball); Halfback (football)

Coaching career (HC unless noted)

Basketball
- 1931–1936: Kansas (freshmen)
- 1936–1950: Colorado
- 1955–1962: Montana

Football
- 1931–1935: Kansas (assistant)
- 1936–1939: Colorado (backfield)

Head coaching record
- Overall: 227–174
- Tournaments: 2–4 (NCAA); 3–1 (NIT)

Accomplishments and honors

Championships
- NIT (1940); 5 MSC regular season(1937–1940, 1942)

Awards
- Basketball; First-team All-American – Christy Walsh (1930); 2× First-team All-Big Six (1930, 1931); Football; Second-team All-Big Six (1930)

Forrest B. "Frosty" Cox (January 22, 1908 – May 22, 1962) was an American college basketball coach. He was the head basketball coach at the University of Colorado Boulder from 1936 to 1950 and the University of Montana from 1955 to 1962, compiling a career record of 227–174.

== Biography ==
Cox was a member of Newton High School's 1926 state championship basketball team. They participated in a national interscholastic tournament and were eliminated in the quarterfinals by the Dutch Clark-led Central High School team from Pueblo, Colorado.

Cox played football and basketball at the University of Kansas from 1928 to 1931. He was captain of the 1928–29 Kansas Jayhawks men's basketball team. He was named to the 1930 All-Big Six Conference football team and Knute Rockne's 1930 College Basketball All-American team. He graduated in 1931, but remained with the university as an assistant coach.

In 1935, Cox became the head men's basketball coach at the University of Colorado Boulder. He also served as the head of intramural athletics and an assistant football coach. He was the position coach for Byron "Whizzer" White, during his All-American season in 1937. Cox led the Colorado Buffaloes men's basketball team a 147–89 record, five Mountain States Conference championships, three NCAA Tournaments, and two National Invitation Tournament, including the 1942 NCAA Final Four and the 1940 NIT title. The Buffaloes also received an invitation to the 1939 NCAA basketball tournament, but had to decline due to a flu outbreak. He resigned after the 1949–50 season to join his brother-in-law in the ranching business in Wakefield, Kansas. In 1954, he was elected president of the Lower Republican Valley Development Association.

In 1955, Cox returned to coaching at the University of Montana (then known as Montana State University). He had an overall record of 80–85 at MSU. He was not retained after the 1961–62 season due to a disagreement with the university's decision to deemphasize athletics and recruiting. On May 22, 1962, he suffered a fatal heart attack while undergoing treatment in a Missoula, Montana hospital.

== Head coaching record ==
Record table
Season	Team	Overall	Conference	Standing	Postseason
Colorado Buffaloes (Mountain States Conference) (1935–1942)
1935–36	Colorado	6–8	6–8	6th	
1936–37	Colorado	14–6	10–2	T–1st	
1937–38	Colorado	15–6	10–2	T–1st	NIT Runner-up
1938–39	Colorado	14–4	10–2	1st	
1939–40	Colorado	17–4	11–1	1st	NCAA Regional Fourth Place, NIT Champion
1940–41	Colorado	10–6	7–5	3rd	
1941–42	Colorado	16–2	11–1	1st	NCAA Final Four
Colorado Buffaloes (Mountain States Conference) (1944–1947)
1944–45	Colorado	13–3	9–1	2nd	
1945–46	Colorado	12–6	9–3	2nd	NCAA Regional Regional Third Place
1946–47	Colorado	7–11	5–7	5th	
Colorado Buffaloes (Big Seven Conference) (1947–1950)
1947–48	Colorado	7–14	4–8	T–6th	
1948–49	Colorado	6–12	4–8	5th	
1949–50	Colorado	14–8	6–6	4th	
Colorado:		147–89 (.623)	102–54 (.654)		
Montana Grizzlies (Mountain States Conference) (1955–1962)
1955–56	Montana	14–12	4–10	8th	
1956–57	Montana	13–9	9–5	3rd	
1957–58	Montana	12–10	8–6	T–5th	
1958–59	Montana	10–14	7–7	5th	
1959–60	Montana	7–17	3–11	T–6th	
1960–61	Montana	14–9	7–7	4th	
1961–62	Montana	10–14	5–9	T–4th	
Montana:		80–85 (.485)	43–55 (.439)		
Total:		227–174 (.566)			
National champion Postseason invitational champion Conference regular season champion Conference regular season and conference tournament champion Division regular season champion Division regular season and conference tournament champion Conference tournament champion

== See also ==
- List of NCAA Division I Men's Final Four appearances by coach
