= Moby Arena =

Basketball arena in Colorado

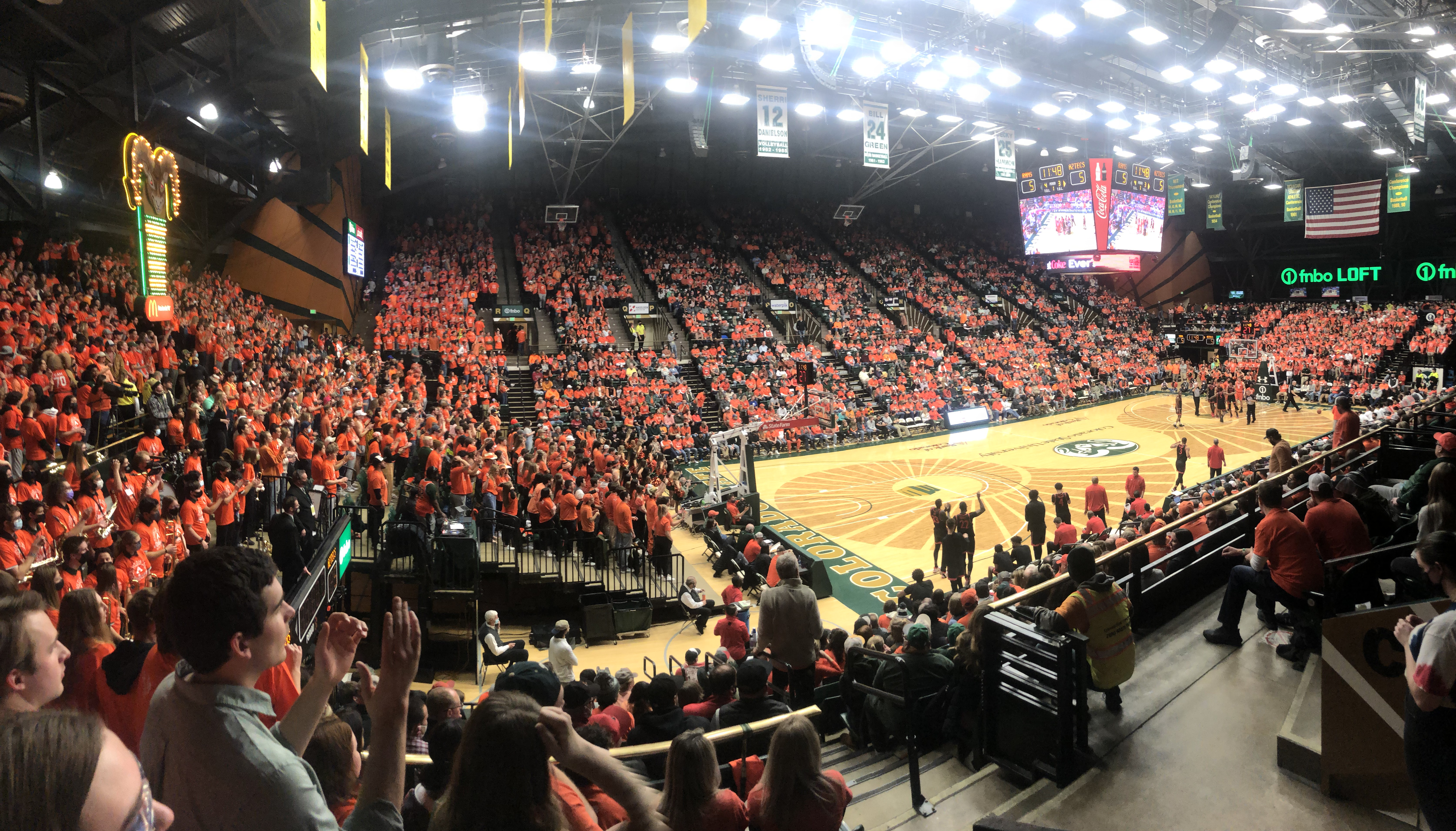
- Moby Arena interior during a 2022 "orange out" game against San Diego State

- Location in Colorado Location in the United States
- Full name: Auditorium-Gymnasium
- Former names: Moby Gymnasium (1966–1986)
- Location: 951 West Plum Street; Fort Collins, Colorado, United States
- Coordinates: 40°34′32.41″N 105°5′36.25″W
- Owner: Colorado State University
- Operator: Colorado State University
- Capacity: 8,083
- Surface: Hardwood

Construction
- Groundbreaking: 1964
- Opened: January 24, 1966
- Architects: Bunts and Kelsey

Tenants
- Colorado State Rams (Volleyball and Basketball)

Moby Arena is an 8,083-seat basketball arena on the campus of Colorado State University in Fort Collins, Colorado. The arena, officially known as the Colorado State Auditorium-Gymnasium, was opened on January 24, 1966, with a victory over New Mexico State. The arena was built to replace South College Gymnasium, which was built in 1926 and seated 1,500 people.

== Design and Name ==
On the outside, the arena is a rounded rectangle over the indented lower level, with a hump-shaped roof arcing over the long sides of the building. Inside, the seating is much higher on the sidelines than in the endzones. However, the most recognizable features of the arena are the corner walls which divide the sidelines from the end zones, and feature large ram's horn patterns on each one, radiating out from the near corners. The basketball court floor also features the ram's horns pattern, created with the use of two different colors of hardwood (the horns used a darker shade prior to 2022, and a lighter shade currently). A video scoreboard hangs from the center of the rafters, and is surrounded by banners as well as retractable basketball hoops for use during practice. Two auxiliary scoreboards are located on opposite corner walls (to the right when standing on either sideline).

The arena was originally intended to be called the Auditorium-Gymnasium during construction, and the building is still listed as such on state records. However, an article in the Rocky Mountain Collegian mentioned the hump-shaped building looking like a beached whale. From that, the gymnasium was nicknamed "Moby Gymnasium" for Moby Dick, the white whale of Herman Mellville's classic story. Athletic director Oval Jaynes renamed the gymnasium "Moby Arena" during his tenure in the late 1980s.

Between the 2021–22 and 2022–23 seasons, the court underwent a renovation that updated fonts and reduced the size of the horns, among other changes.

== Uses ==
The arena is home to the Colorado State University Rams basketball and volleyball teams. In 1967, it hosted two first-round games for the West and Midwest regions, for that year's men's basketball tournament. It also hosted the 1992 Western Athletic Conference men's basketball tournament.

Moby Arena also hosts concerts. The Rolling Stones played the first show of their 1969 tour at the arena. Other artists to have played there are Frank Zappa, Big Head Todd and the Monsters, Steve Miller Band, O.A.R., Dave Matthews Band, The Fray, Blind Melon, Gov't Mule, Ludacris, Lupe Fiasco, Three 6 Mafia, Guess Who, Beach Boys, Emerson, Lake and Palmer, Doobie Brothers, Chicago, Jerry Jeff Walker, Van Halen, and Willie Nelson and Tanya Tucker.

Parts of the 1977 film One on One were filmed in Moby Arena.

Campus Crusade for Christ hosts its U.S. staff conference every other year at CSU; main sessions are held inside Moby Arena.

The Philadelphia 76ers of the National Basketball Association held part of their 2023 training camp at Moby Arena before the 2023-24 NBA season from October 3 to October 6.

== Gallery ==
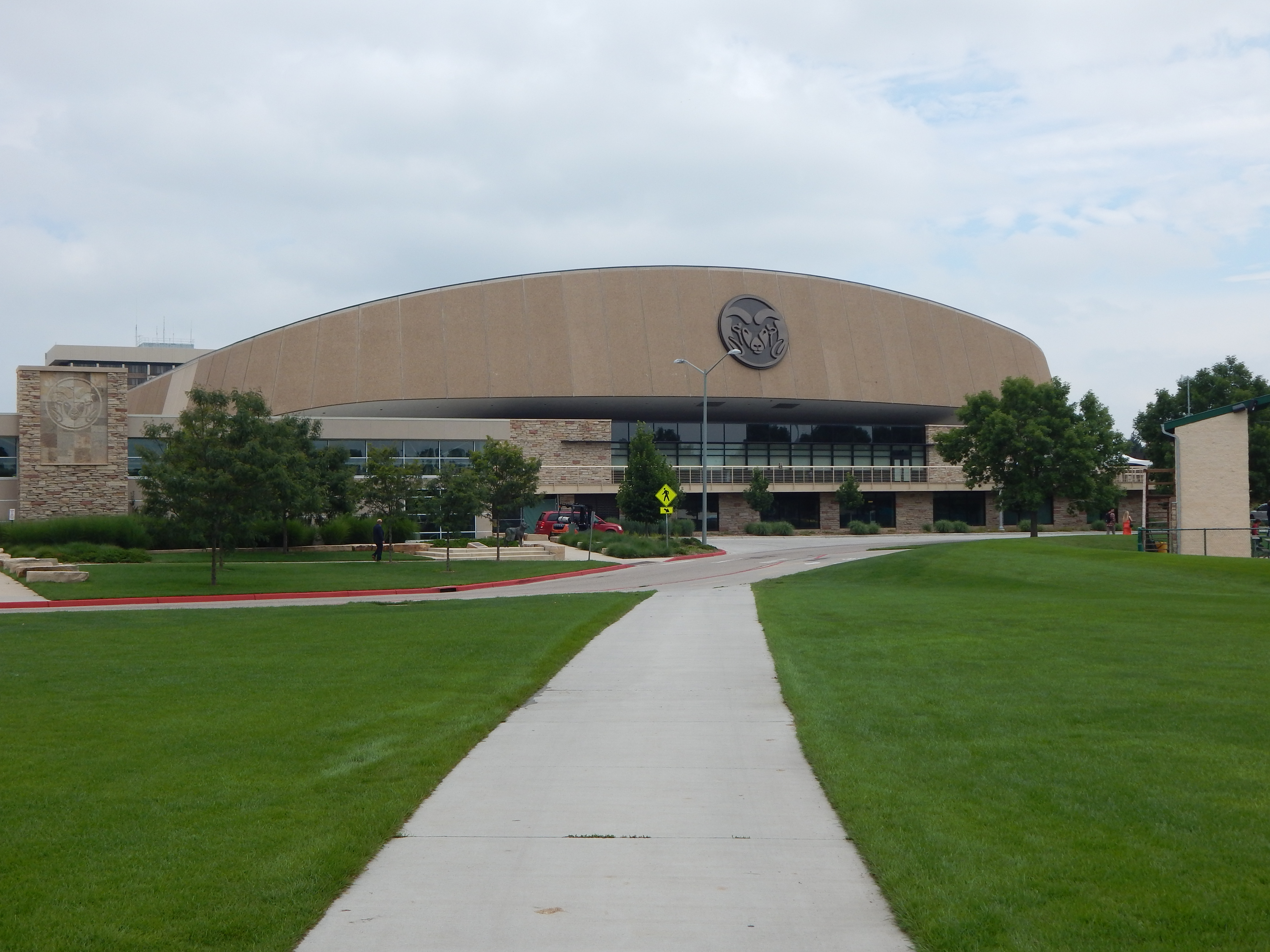
Moby Arena, 2015.

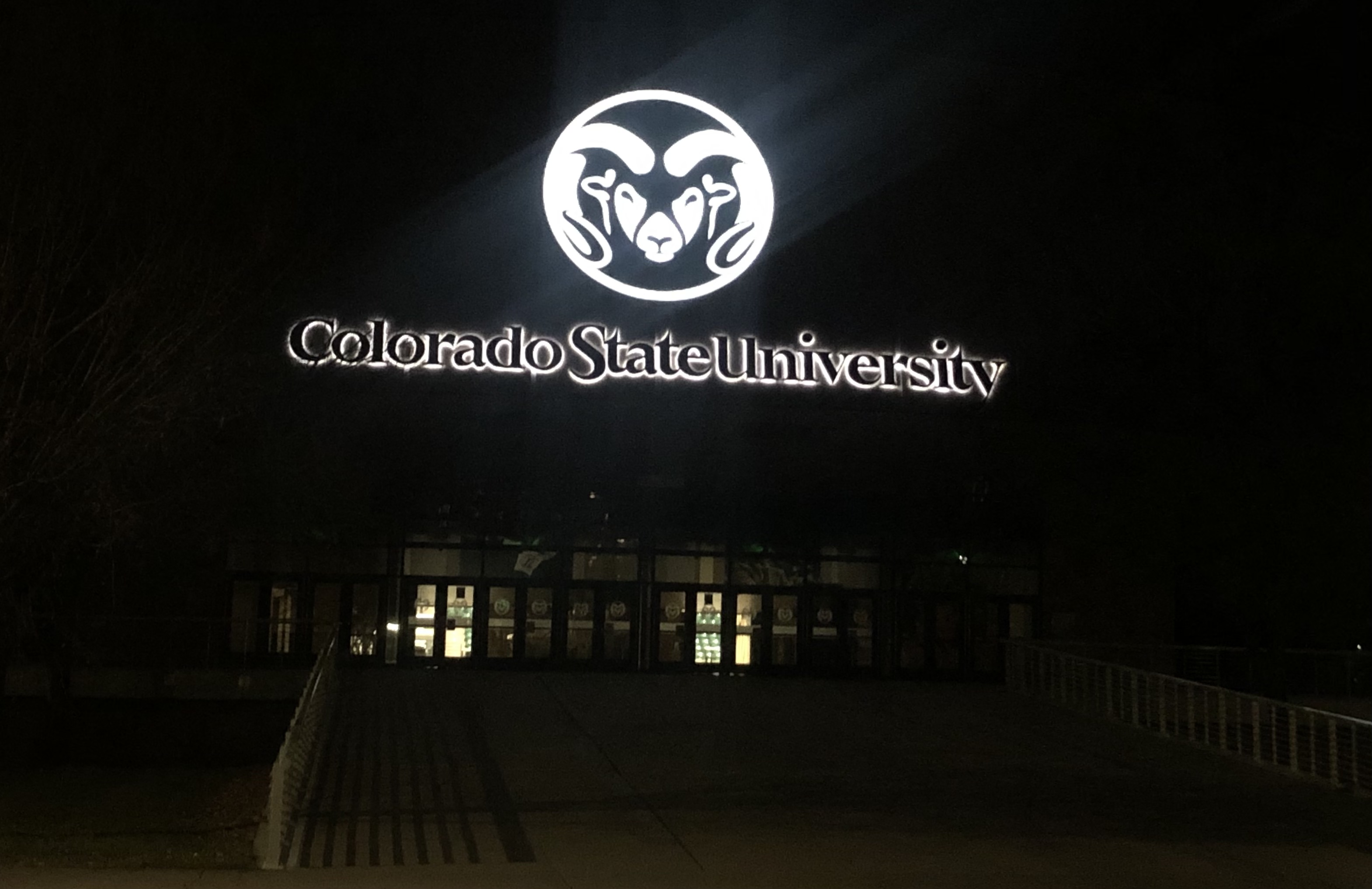
Moby Arena's front entrance at night, 2021.

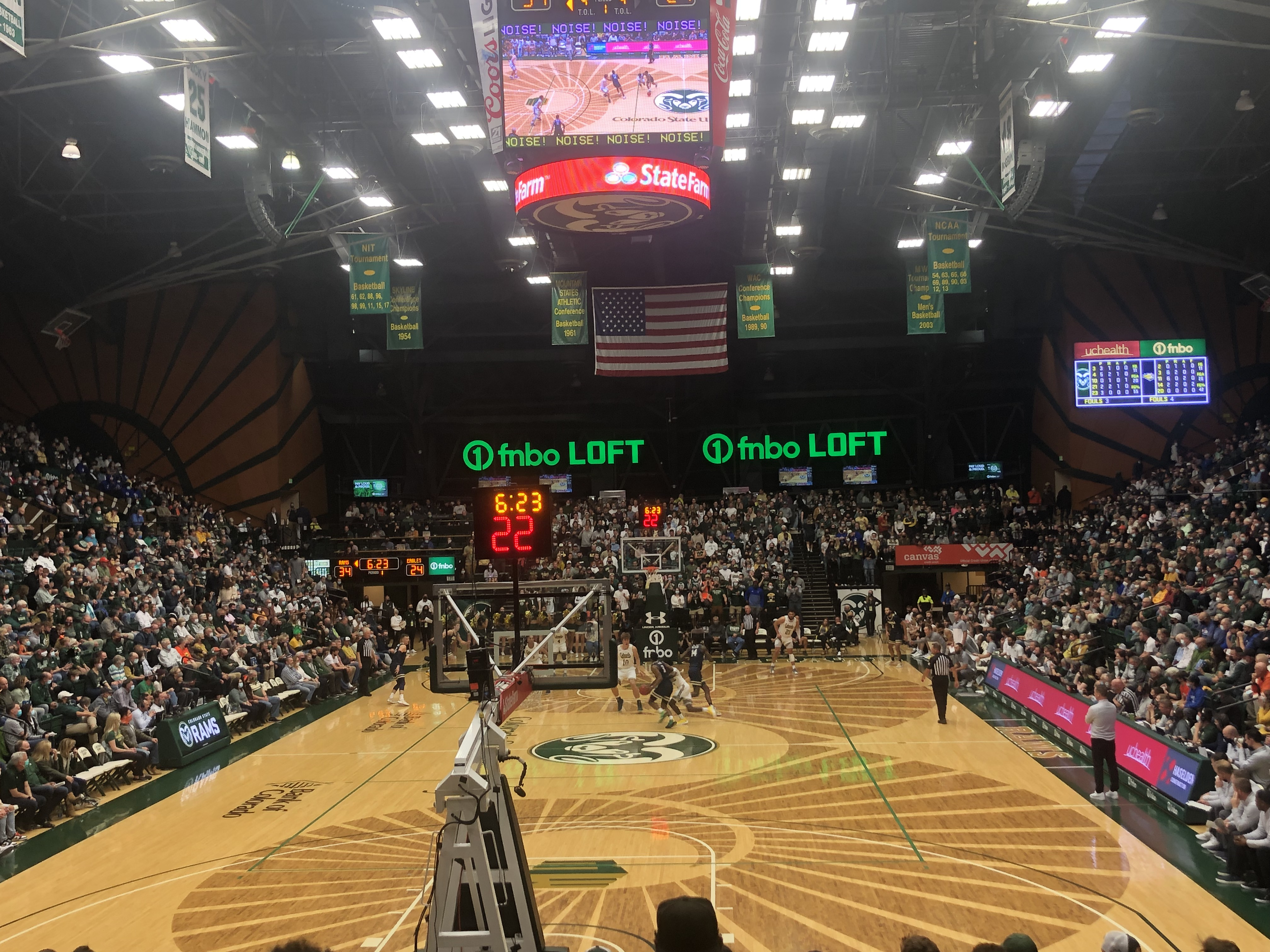
Moby Arena's interior, 2021.

== See also ==
- Colorado State University
- Colorado State Rams men's basketball
- List of NCAA Division I basketball arenas
