= List of Lafayette Leopards men's basketball head coaches =

The following is a list of Lafayette Leopards men's basketball head coaches. There have been 26 head coaches of the Leopards in their 113-season history.

Lafayette's current head coach is Mike McGarvey. He was named interim head coach in February 2023, after then-head coach Mike Jordan was placed on paid leave pending an investigation, then given the job permanently in March 2023 when Lafayette elected not to retain Jordan.

No.	Tenure	Coach	Years	Record	Pct.
1	1900–1901	B. J. Myers	1	4–3	.571
2	1901–1902	J. L. Baker	1	5–5	.500
3	1902–1903	W. S. Haldeman	1	18–16	.529
4	1913–1914	J. Craft	1	5–7	.417
5	1914–1915	Joe Fogarty	1	4–10	.286
6	1915–1916	Wilmer G. Crowell	1	7–9	.438
7	1916–1917	J. B. Quig	1	15–9	.625
8	1917–1919; 1920–1925; 1945–1949	Bill Anderson	11	139–82	.629
9	1919–1920	William McAvoy	1	3–7	.300
10	1925–1929	M. A. Miller	4	25–46	.352
11	1929–1935	Herbert A. Lorenz	6	37–56	.398
12	1935–1936	P. M. Shellenberger	1	7–9	.438
13	1936–1938	Mike Michalske	2	15–21	.417
14	1938–1942	Richard Madison	4	29–41	.414
15	1942–1945	Arthur R. Winters	3	30–11	.732
16	1949–1951	Ray Stanley	2	32–17	.653
17	1951–1955; 1984–1988	Butch van Breda Kolff	8	132–85	.608
18	1955–1967	George Davidson	12	170–116	.594
19	1967–1971	Hal Wissel	4	43–59	.422
20	1971–1977	Tom Davis	6	116–44	.725
21	1977–1980	Roy Chipman	3	60–28	.682
22	1980–1984	Will Rackley	4	46–66	.411
23	1988–1995	John Leone	7	68–128	.347
24	1995–2022	Fran O'Hanlon	27	362–432	.456
25	2022–2023 (Note: Jordan was placed on a leave of absence in February 2023 during an investigation into Jordan's behavior. Mike McGarvey was named interim head coach while Jordan was on leave. Following the season and at the conclusion of the investigation, Lafayette did not retain Jordan as head coach.)	Mike Jordan	1	9–20	.310
26	2023–present (Note: After finishing the 2022–23 season as interim head coach, McGarvey was hired as the permanent head coach in March 2023.)	Mike McGarvey	1	2–3	.400
Totals		26 coaches	113 seasons	1,383–1,328	.510
Records updated through end of 2022–23 season * - Denotes interim head coach. Source
