= 1941–42 Georgia Bulldogs basketball team =

American college basketball season

1941–42 Georgia Bulldogs basketball
- Conference: Southeastern Conference
- Record: 7–10 (5–8 SEC)
- Head coach: Elmer A. Lampe (5th season)
- Captain: Bobby Moore
- Home arena: Woodruff Hall

1941–42 Southeastern Conference men's basketball standings
	Conf.				Overall
Team	W		L	PCT	W		L	PCT
Tennessee	7	–	1	.875	19	–	3	.864
Alabama	13	–	4	.765	18	–	6	.750
Kentucky †	6	–	2	.750	19	–	6	.760
LSU	8	–	3	.727	8	–	7	.533
Auburn	9	–	5	.643	11	–	6	.647
Mississippi State	9	–	6	.600	13	–	7	.650
Georgia	5	–	8	.385	7	–	10	.412
Georgia Tech	4	–	7	.364	8	–	8	.500
Florida	3	–	8	.273	8	–	9	.471
Vanderbilt	3	–	8	.273	7	–	9	.438
Tulane	3	–	9	.250	4	–	12	.250
Ole Miss	3	–	12	.200	4	–	15	.211
† Regular-season championship and SEC Tournament winner

The 1941–42 Georgia Bulldogs basketball team represented the University of Georgia as a member of the Southeastern Conference (SEC) during the 1941–42 NCAA men's basketball season. Led by fifth-year head coach Elmer A. Lampe, the Bulldogs compiled an overall record of 7–10 with a mark of 5–8 in conference play, placing seventh in the SEC. The team captain was Bobby Moore.

== Schedule ==
Date time, TV	Opponent	Result	Record	Site city, state
1/5/1942	South Carolina	L 30-37	0–1	Athens, GA
1/6/1942	Clemson	W 38-31	1–1	Athens, GA
1/9/1942	at Florida	W 42-33	2–1	
1/10/1942	at Florida	L 28-29	2–2	
1/16/1942	Alabama	L 29-33	2–3	Athens, GA
1/19/1942	Kentucky	L 26-51	2–4	Athens, GA
1/24/1942	at Clemson	W 63-52	3–4	
1/27/1942	at Vanderbilt	L 38-58	3–5	
1/31/1942	at Kentucky	L 38-55	3–6	
2/6/1942	Auburn	L 28-32	3–7	Athens, GA
2/9/1942	Florida	W 27-26	4–7	Athens, GA
2/10/1942	Florida	W 39-27	5–7	Athens, GA
2/13/1942	at Auburn	L 41-53	5–8	
2/16/1942	Ole Miss	W 36-27	6–8	Athens, GA
2/19/1942	at Georgia Tech	L 29-49	6–9	
2/21/1942	Georgia Tech	W 38-37	7–9	Athens, GA
2/26/1942	Tennessee	L 52-60	7–10	Athens, GA
*Non-conference game. (#) Tournament seedings in parentheses.
