= 1941–42 Cincinnati Bearcats men's basketball team =

American college basketball season

1941–42 Cincinnati Bearcats men's basketball
- Conference: Independent
- Record: 10–10
- Head coach: Clark Ballard (3rd season)
- Captain: Ellis King
- Home arena: Schmidlapp Gymnasium

The 1941–42 Cincinnati Bearcats men's basketball team represented the University of Cincinnati during the 1941–42 NCAA men's basketball season. The head coach was Clark Ballard, coaching his third season with the Bearcats. The team finished with an overall record of 10–10.

== Schedule ==
| Date time, TV | Opponent | Result | Record | Site city, state |
|---|---|---|---|---|
| November 29 | Georgetown (KY) | L 29–33 | 0–1 | Schmidlapp Gymnasium; Cincinnati, OH |
| December 10 | Morehead (KY) | W 47–38 | 1–1 | Schmidlapp Gymnasium; Cincinnati, OH |
| December 13 | at Wooster | L 32–43 | 1–2 | Wooster, OH |
| December 18 | at Marietta | W 55–44 | 2–2 | Marietta, OH |
| December 20 | Wilmington | W 54–21 | 3–2 | Schmidlapp Gymnasium; Cincinnati, OH |
| January 3 | Hanover | W 60–41 | 4–2 | Schmidlapp Gymnasium; Cincinnati, OH |
| January 10 | at Miami (OH) | W 36–26 | 5–2 | Withrow Court; Oxford, OH |
| January 13 | Toledo | L 41–50 | 5–3 | Schmidlapp Gymnasium; Cincinnati, OH |
| January 22 | at Michigan State | L 30–37 | 5–4 | Jenison Fieldhouse; East Lansing, MI |
| January 24 | at Dayton | L 39–47 | 5–5 | Schmidlapp Gymnasium; Cincinnati, OH |
| January 28 | at Wilmington | W 53–38 | 6–5 | Schmidlapp Gymnasium; Wilmington, OH |
| January 31 | Ohio | W 41–28 | 7–5 | Schmidlapp Gymnasium; Cincinnati, OH |
| February 3 | at Akron | L 32–42 | 7–6 | Akron Armory; Akron, OH |
| January 29 | Michigan State | L 30–36 | 7–7 | Schmidlapp Gymnasium; Cincinnati, OH |
| February 10 | Wayne (MI) | L 43–51 | 7–8 | Cincinnati, OH |
| February 14 | at Dayton | L 37–42 | 7–9 | Montgomery County Fairgrounds; Dayton, OH |
| February 17 | at Ohio | L 41–51 | 7–10 | Men's Gymnasium; Athens, OH |
| February 21 | at Hanover | W 61–57 | 8–10 | Hanover, IN |
| February 25 | Miami (OH) | W 63–59 | 9–10 | Schmidlapp Gymnasium; Cincinnati, OH |
| February 28 | Alumni | W 37–33 | 10–10 | Schmidlapp Gymnasium; Cincinnati, OH |
*Non-conference game. (#) Tournament seedings in parentheses.
