= 1941–42 Indiana Hoosiers men's basketball team =

American college basketball season

1941–42 Indiana Hoosiers men's basketball
- Conference: Big Ten Conference
- Record: 15–6 (10–5 Big Ten)
- Head coach: Branch McCracken (4th season)
- Captain: Andy Zimmer
- Home arena: The Fieldhouse

1941–42 Big Ten Conference men's basketball standings
	Conf.				Overall
Team	W		L	PCT	W		L	PCT
Illinois	13	–	2	.867	18	–	5	.783
Indiana	10	–	5	.667	15	–	6	.714
Wisconsin	10	–	5	.667	14	–	7	.667
Iowa	10	–	5	.667	12	–	8	.600
Minnesota	9	–	6	.600	15	–	6	.714
Purdue	9	–	6	.600	14	–	7	.667
Northwestern	5	–	10	.333	8	–	13	.381
Michigan	5	–	10	.333	6	–	14	.300
Ohio State	4	–	11	.267	6	–	14	.300
Chicago	0	–	15	.000	1	–	20	.048

The 1941–42 Indiana Hoosiers men's basketball team represented Indiana University. Their head coach was Branch McCracken, who was in his 4th year. The team played its home games in The Fieldhouse in Bloomington, Indiana, and was a member of the Big Ten Conference.

The Hoosiers finished the regular season with an overall record of 15–6 and a conference record of 10–5, finishing 2nd in the Big Ten Conference. Indiana was not invited to participate in any postseason tournament.

== Roster ==
No.	Name	Position	Ht.	Year	Hometown
7	John Logan	F	6–1	Jr.	Richmond, Indiana
8	Bill Frey	F	6–1	Sr.	Kokomo, Indiana
10	Ralph Hamilton	F	6–1	So.	Fort Wayne, Indiana
11	William Torphy	G	6–1	Sr.	Bedford, Indiana
14	Irv Swanson	G	5–10	Jr.	LaPorte, Indiana
15	Roy Kilby	G	5–10	So.	Muncie, Indiana
16	Warren Lewis	F	6–1	So.	New Castle, Indiana
17	Robert Gwin	G	6–1	So.	Shoals, Indiana
18	Ed Denton	C	6–2	Jr.	Jeffersonville, Indiana
21	Dick Wittenbraker	G	6–2	So.	New Castle, Indiana
25	Al Wise	F	6–3	So.	Brookville, Indiana
27	Hal Driver	C	6–3	Jr.	Aurora, Indiana
35	Bob Hines	C	6–2	So.	Fort Wayne, Indiana
38	Swift Wunker	F	N/A	So.	Lawrenceburg, Indiana
39	Neil Funk	F	6–3	So.	LaPorte, Indiana
41	Andy Zimmer	C/G	6–4	Sr.	Goodland, Indiana
42	Everett Hoffman	C	6–3	Sr.	Evansville, Indiana
N/A	Lawrence Alleyne	F	6–1	So.	Bloomington, Indiana

== Schedule/results ==
Date time, TV	Rank^{#}	Opponent^{#}	Result	Record	Site city, state
Regular season
12/10/1941*		Wabash	W 36–27	1–0	The Fieldhouse; Bloomington, Indiana
12/11/1941*		Great Lakes	L 36–41	1–1	The Fieldhouse; Bloomington, Indiana
12/15/1941*		Nebraska	W 56–29	2–1	The Field House; Bloomington, Indiana
12/18/1941*		UCLA	W 47–33	3–1	The Fieldhouse; Bloomington, Indiana
12/26/1941*		at Pittsburgh	W 50–41	4–1	Pitt Pavilion; Pittsburgh
12/27/1941*		at George Washington	W 52–43	5–1	Washington, D.C.
1/3/1942		at Northwestern	L 40–50	5–2 (0–1)	Patten Gymnasium; Evanston, Illinois
1/5/1942		Wisconsin	W 38–34	6–2 (1–1)	The Fieldhouse; Bloomington, Indiana
1/10/1942		at Minnesota	L 43–63	6–3 (1–2)	Minnesota Field House; Minneapolis
1/12/1942		Purdue; Rivalry	W 40–39	7–3 (2–2)	The Fieldhouse; Bloomington, Indiana
1/24/1942		at Wisconsin	L 36–42	7–4 (2–3)	Wisconsin Field House; Madison, Wisconsin
1/26/1942		Michigan	W 64–36	8–4 (3–3)	The Fieldhouse; Bloomington, Indiana
1/31/1942		at Chicago	W 63–34	9–4 (4–3)	Henry Crown Field House; Chicago
2/2/1942		at Ohio State	W 46–43	10–4 (5–3)	Ohio Expo Center Coliseum; Columbus, Ohio
2/9/1942		Illinois; Rivalry	W 41–36	11–4 (6–3)	The Fieldhouse; Bloomington, Indiana
2/14/1942		Chicago	W 52–20	12–4 (7–3)	The Fieldhouse; Bloomington, Indiana
2/16/1942		at Michigan	W 47–42	13–4 (8–3)	Yost Field House; Ann Arbor, Michigan
2/23/1942		at Iowa	L 52–55	13–5 (8–4)	Iowa Field House; Iowa City, IA
2/28/1942		Minnesota	W 54–45	14–5 (9–4)	The Fieldhouse; Bloomington, Indiana
3/2/1942		Northwestern	L 45–49	14–6 (9–5)	The Fieldhouse; Bloomington, Indiana
3/7/1942		Ohio State	W 48–23	15–6 (10–5)	The Fieldhouse; Bloomington, Indiana
*Non-conference game. ^{#}Rankings from AP Poll. (#) Tournament seedings in parentheses.
