= Glenn Morris Field House =

College athletic building in Fort Collins, Colorado

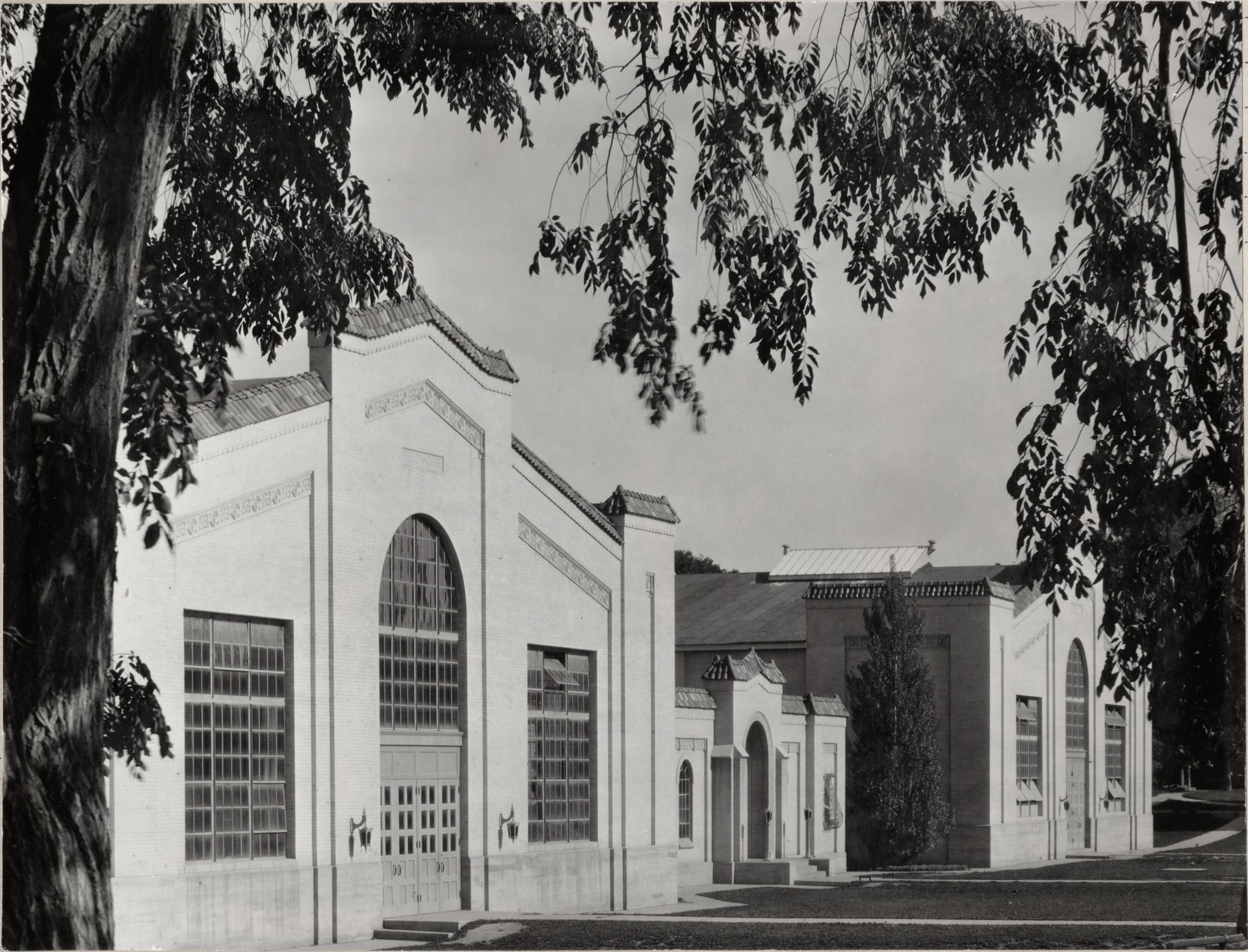
- Colorado State's Glenn Morris Field House, then known as South College Gymnasium

- Location in Colorado Location in the United States
- Full name: Glenn Morris Field House
- Former names: South College Gymnasium (1926–2011)
- Location: 920 South Mason Street; Fort Collins, Colorado, United States
- Coordinates: 40°34′26.158″N 105°4′43.776″W
- Owner: Colorado State University
- Operator: Colorado State University
- Capacity: 1,500

Construction
- Groundbreaking: 1925
- Opened: 1926

Tenants
- Colorado State Rams men's basketball (1926–1966); Colorado State Rams practice facility (1966–present)

Glenn Morris Field House, known as South College Gymnasium from 1926 to 2011, is a Colorado State University athletic building and former home venue of Colorado State Rams men's basketball. The building opened in 1926 and served as the school's basketball arena from 1926 until 1966 when the team moved to Moby Arena. Today, the building is still used as a practice facility for the university's track and field team.

== Design and name ==
When South College Gymnasium was opened in 1926, the H-shaped building featured a main gymnasium in the north wing and a field house in the south wing. Athletic offices and locker rooms for all athletics were moved into the new building upon its opening. The field house had a large indoor track with a dirt surface which was able to accommodate both the track and field team and football team for practices in bad weather. The building also held a swimming pool. The building was renovated and expanded in 1998.

The building was known as South College Gymnasium from its opening in 1926 until 2011, when it was renamed Glenn Morris Field House after Olympics star and Colorado State alumnus Glenn Morris. Originally from Simla, Colorado, Morris graduated from Colorado State — then known as Colorado A&M — in 1935. While at Colorado A&M, Morris served as the student body president and competed in football, basketball and track. In the 1936 U.S. Olympic track and field trials, Morris set a new world record of 7,880 points. Morris broke his own world record, as well as the Olympic record, in the 1936 Summer Olympics, with a decathlon score of 7,900 points. It was said that Adolf Hitler never left his seat while Morris was competing, and that the Germans offered Morris $50,000 to stay in Germany after the Olympics and appear in sports films, an offer Morris refused.

== Uses ==
Outside of athletics, the building has had many uses over the years. In the mid-1930s, a Rocky Mountain Collegian article described the building as the "most-used building in Fort Collins" due to the number of events such as car shows and formal dances that were held in the building. Until 1990 when the process moved online, students registered for all classes in person in either the South College Gymnasium or Moby Arena.

After World War II, the building was used as a temporary dormitory to house the influx of veterans returning to university on the G.I. Bill.
