= 1941–42 William & Mary Indians men's basketball team =

American college basketball season

1941–42 William & Mary Indians men's basketball
- Conference: Southern Conference
- Record: 15–9 (8–4 SoCon)
- Head coach: Dwight Steussey (3rd season)
- Home arena: Blow Gymnasium

The 1941–42 William & Mary Indians men's basketball team represented the College of William & Mary in intercollegiate basketball during the 1941–42 NCAA men's basketball season. Under the third year of head coach Dwight Steussey, the team finished the season 15–9 and 8–4 in the Southern Conference. This was the 37th season of the collegiate basketball program at William & Mary, whose nickname is now the Tribe.

The Indians finished in a tie for 5th place in the conference and qualified for the 1942 Southern Conference men's basketball tournament hosted by North Carolina State University at the Thompson Gym in Raleigh, North Carolina. For the second straight season, the Indians won their first-round game (against George Washington) before falling in the semifinal round (against hosts NC State).

The Indians played two teams for the first time this season: Fordham and Villanova.

== Schedule ==
1941–42 Southern Conference men's basketball standings
	Conf.				Overall
Team	W		L	PCT	W		L	PCT
Duke †	15	–	1	.938	22	–	2	.917
George Washington	8	–	3	.727	11	–	9	.550
Wake Forest	13	–	5	.722	16	–	8	.667
North Carolina State	9	–	4	.692	15	–	7	.682
William & Mary	8	–	4	.667	15	–	9	.625
South Carolina	8	–	4	.667	12	–	9	.571
North Carolina	9	–	5	.643	14	–	9	.609
Washington and Lee	7	–	7	.500	10	–	15	.400
Furman	7	–	8	.467	10	–	9	.526
Richmond	4	–	8	.333	9	–	9	.500
Virginia Tech	4	–	8	.333	10	–	10	.500
VMI	5	–	10	.333	7	–	11	.389
Maryland	3	–	8	.273	7	–	15	.318
Davidson	3	–	9	.250	12	–	13	.480
Clemson	2	–	10	.167	3	–	14	.176
The Citadel	1	–	12	.077	2	–	14	.125
† Southern Conference Tournament winner

Date time, TV	Rank^{#}	Opponent^{#}	Result	Record	Site city, state
Regular season
*		at Langley Field	W 35–31	1–0	Hampton, Virginia
*		Randolph–Macon	W 52–28	2–0	Blow Gymnasium; Williamsburg, Virginia
12/16/1941		Maryland	W 39–34	3–0 (1–0)	Blow Gymnasium; Williamsburg, Virginia
*		at Fordham	L 27–59	3–1	Rose Hill Gymnasium; The Bronx, New York
*		at Villanova	L 28–49	3–2	Jake Nevin Field House; Villanova, Pennsylvania
		at VMI	W 47–42	4–2 (2–0)	Cormack Field House; Lexington, Virginia
		at VPI	W 35–29	5–2 (3–0)	War Memorial Gymnasium; Blacksburg, Virginia
		at Washington and Lee	W 41–37	6–2 (4–0)	Doremus Gymnasium; Lexington, Virginia
1/13/1942		vs. Richmond	W 47–33	7–2 (5–0)	Cavalier Arena; Richmond, Virginia
*		Virginia	W 39–24	8–2	Blow Gymnasium; Williamsburg, Virginia
*		Apprentice School	W 67–49	9–2	Blow Gymnasium; Williamsburg, Virginia
*		Hampden–Sydney	W 65–35	10–2	Blow Gymnasium; Williamsburg, Virginia
		VPI	L 39–45	10–3 (5–1)	Blow Gymnasium; Williamsburg, Virginia
2/2/1942		at Clemson	W 54–28	11–3 (6–1)	Clemson Field House; Clemson, South Carolina
2/6/1942		at Furman	L 35–37	11–4 (6–2)	Greenville, South Carolina
*		at Virginia	L 30–38	11–5	Memorial Gymnasium; Charlottesville, Virginia
2/13/1942		at Maryland	L 32–42	11–6 (6–3)	Ritchie Coliseum; College Park, Maryland
2/14/1942*		at Navy	W 42–40	12–6	Dahlgren Hall; Annapolis, Maryland
2/17/1942		Richmond	W 42–29	13–6 (7–3)	Blow Gymnasium; Williamsburg, Virginia
		Washington and Lee	L 27–31	13–7 (7–4)	Blow Gymnasium; Williamsburg, Virginia
		VMI	W 33–32	14–7 (8–4)	Blow Gymnasium; Williamsburg, Virginia
*		at Hampden–Sydney	L 47–49	14–8	Hampden Sydney, Virginia
Southern Conference Tournament
3/5/1942		vs. George Washington; Quarterfinals	W 44–33	15–8	Thompson Gym; Raleigh, North Carolina
3/6/1942		vs. NC State; Semifinals	L 53–54	15–9	Thompson Gym; Raleigh, North Carolina
*Non-conference game. ^{#}Rankings from AP Poll. (#) Tournament seedings in parentheses.
