= 1941–42 Iowa State Cyclones men's basketball team =

American college basketball season

1941–42 Iowa State Cyclones men's basketball
- Conference: Big Six Conference
- Record: 11–6 (5–5 Big Six)
- Head coach: Louis Menze (14th season)
- Assistant coach: Cap Timm
- Home arena: State Gymnasium

The 1941–42 Iowa State Cyclones men's basketball team represented Iowa State College in the 1941–42 college basketball season. The team was led by 14th-year head coach Louis Menze. In 1940–41, the Cyclones finished 15–4 overall (7–3 in the Big Six Conference). The team's captain was Al Budolfson.

1941–42 Big Six Conference men's basketball standings
| | Conf. | | | | Overall |
| Team | W | | L | PCT | W | | L | PCT |
|---|---|---|---|---|---|---|---|---|
| Kansas | 8 | – | 2 | .800 | 17 | – | 5 | .773 |
| Oklahoma | 8 | – | 2 | .800 | 11 | – | 7 | .611 |
| Iowa State | 5 | – | 5 | .500 | 11 | – | 6 | .647 |
| Nebraska | 4 | – | 6 | .400 | 6 | – | 13 | .316 |
| Kansas State | 3 | – | 7 | .300 | 8 | – | 10 | .444 |
| Missouri | 2 | – | 8 | .200 | 6 | – | 12 | .333 |

== Roster ==
1941–42 Iowa State Cyclones men's basketball team
Players
Coaches

| Pos. | # | Name | Height | Weight | Year | Hometown |
|---|---|---|---|---|---|---|
| C | | Gordon Bell | — | — |
| F | | Al Budolfson (C) | — | — | Sr |
| | | Harle Damon | — | — |
| | | Jerry Deneckere | — | — | | Rock Island, Illinois |
| G | | Kenny Donelson | — | — |
| | | Herman Eppink | — | — |
| | | Bob Harris | — | — | Sr |
| F | | Bob Hayes | — | — | | Plattsmouth, Nebraska |
| C | | Rollin Kuebler | 6 ft 3 in (1.91 m) | — | So | Carroll, Iowa |
| F | | Reuben Mickelson | — | — | So | Thief River Falls, Minnesota |
| F | | Norman Pedersen | — | — |
| | | Carol Schneider | 6 ft 8 in (2.03 m) | — | Sr |
| G | | Leon Uknes | — | — | | Sioux City, Iowa |
| C | | Henry Vogt | — | — |
| G | | Howard Walton | — | — |

Head coach

- Louis Menze

Assistant coach(es)

Cap Timm

Legend

- (C) Team captain
- (S) Suspended
- (I) Ineligible
- (W) Walk-on
- Injured
- Current redshirt

== Player stats ==
Note: PPG = points per game

| Player | Class | Pos | PPG |
|---|---|---|---|
| Al Budolfson | Sr | F | 12.3 |
| Bob Harris | Sr | G | 8.1 |
| Carol Schneider | Sr | G | 7.5 |

== Schedule ==
| Date time, TV | Rank^{#} | Opponent^{#} | Result | Record | Site city, state |
Regular season
| December 4, 1941* | | Coe | W 46–33 | 1–0 | State Gymnasium; Ames, Iowa |
| December 8, 1941*; 8:15 pm | | at Drake; Iowa Big Four | W 46–30 | 2–0 | Drake Fieldhouse; Des Moines, Iowa |
| December 13, 1941* | | at Bradley | W 56–43 | 3–0 | Woodruff High School Gym; Peoria, Illinois |
| December 20, 1941* | | Grinnell | W 42–27 | 4–0 | State Gymnasium; Ames, Iowa |
| December 31, 1941*; 7:30 pm | | Drake; Iowa Big Four | W 49–20 | 5–0 | State Gymnasium; Ames, Iowa |
| January 7, 1942* | | Dubuque | W 46–30 | 6–0 | State Gymnasium; Ames, Iowa |
| January 10, 1942 | | Missouri | W 46–30 | 7–0 (1–0) | State Gymnasium; Ames, Iowa |
| January 19, 1942; 7:15 pm | | Kansas | W 45–41 | 8–0 (2–0) | State Gymnasium; Ames, Iowa |
| January 24, 1942 | | at Missouri | L 25–34 | 8–1 (2–1) | Brewer Fieldhouse; Columbia, Missouri |
| January 26, 1942 | | at Oklahoma | L 37–46 | 8–2 (2–2) | OU Field House; Norman, Oklahoma |
| January 31, 1942; 7:30 pm | | Nebraska | W 39–33 | 9–2 (3–2) | State Gymnasium; Ames, Iowa |
| February 3, 1942* | | Great Lakes Naval | L 42–43 | 9–3 | State Gymnasium; Ames, Iowa |
| February 7, 1942 | | at Nebraska | L 31–39 | 9–4 (3–3) | Nebraska Coliseum; Lincoln, Nebraska |
| February 9, 1942; 7:30 pm | | at Kansas State | W 44–43 | 10–4 (4–3) | Nichols Hall; Manhattan, Kansas |
| February 16, 1942 | | at Kansas | L 44–60 | 10–5 (4–4) | Hoch Auditorium; Lawrence, Kansas |
| February 23, 1942 | | Oklahoma | W 46–43 | 11–5 (5–4) | State Gymnasium; Ames, Iowa |
| February 27, 1942; 7:30 pm | | Kansas State | L 34–36 | 11–6 (5–5) | State Gymnasium; Ames, Iowa |
*Non-conference game. ^{#}Rankings from AP poll. (#) Tournament seedings in parentheses. All times are in Central Time.
