= George Nelson Fieldhouse =

Multi-purpose arena in Logan, Utah

- The Fieldhouse
- Full name: George Nelson Fieldhouse
- Location: Logan, Utah
- Owner: Utah State University
- Operator: Utah State University

Construction
- Opened: 1940

Tenant
- Utah State Aggies men's basketball

The George Nelson Fieldhouse is a multi-purpose arena on the campus of Utah State University in Logan, Utah. As a 6,500-seat arena, it was home to the Utah State Aggies men's basketball team until the Dee Glen Smith Spectrum opened in 1970.

Since the removal of the bleachers, the Fieldhouse now functions primarily as an exercise facility for Students. It contains three basketball courts, pickleball court, a running track, and a student fitness center. The building sits directly across from the Aggie Recreation Center, the largest exercise facility on campus.

Though the Fieldhouse no longer serves the USU basketball teams, it remains the primary venue for home varsity indoor track meets.

Outside of Athletics events and Campus Recreation, it is used as a venue especially for large festivals and parties, including Utah State's annual Halloween party, The Howl, known for attracting large crowds. The Fieldhouse also hosts USU's History Department's Ludi Romani each Spring, a reenactment of the period of Roman history between the assassination of Julius Caesar in 44 BCE and the Battle of Actium in 31 BCE by students, faculty, and alumni.
