= 1941–42 Wisconsin Badgers men's basketball team =

American college basketball season

1941–42 Wisconsin Badgers men's basketball
- Conference: Big Ten Conference
- Record: 14–7 (10–5 Big Ten)
- Head coach: Harold E. Foster
- Home arena: UW Fieldhouse

1941–42 Big Ten Conference men's basketball standings
	Conf.				Overall
Team	W		L	PCT	W		L	PCT
Illinois	13	–	2	.867	18	–	5	.783
Indiana	10	–	5	.667	15	–	6	.714
Wisconsin	10	–	5	.667	14	–	7	.667
Iowa	10	–	5	.667	12	–	8	.600
Minnesota	9	–	6	.600	15	–	6	.714
Purdue	9	–	6	.600	14	–	7	.667
Northwestern	5	–	10	.333	8	–	13	.381
Michigan	5	–	10	.333	6	–	14	.300
Ohio State	4	–	11	.267	6	–	14	.300
Chicago	0	–	15	.000	1	–	20	.048

The 1941–42 Wisconsin Badgers men's basketball team represented University of Wisconsin–Madison. The head coach was Harold E. Foster, coaching his eighth season with the Badgers. The team played their home games at the UW Fieldhouse in Madison, Wisconsin and was a member of the Big Ten Conference.

== Schedule ==
Date time, TV	Rank^{#}	Opponent^{#}	Result	Record	Site city, state
Regular Season
12/01/1941*		Carroll (WI)	W 56–35	1–0	UW Fieldhouse; Madison, Wisconsin
12/06/1941*		Marquette	W 35–34	2–0	UW Fieldhouse; Madison, Wisconsin
12/13/1941*		Notre Dame	W 43–35	3–0	UW Fieldhouse; Madison, Wisconsin
12/20/1941*		at Marquette	W 36–25	4–0	Marquette Gymnasium; Milwaukee
12/31/1941*		vs. Dartmouth	L 49–57	4–1	Marquette Gymnasium; Milwaukee, Wisconsin
1/03/1942		Illinois	L 40–55	4–2 (0–1)	UW Fieldhouse; Madison, Wisconsin
1/05/1942		at Indiana	L 34–38	4–3 (0–2)	IU Fieldhouse; Bloomington, Indiana
1/10/1942		at Iowa	L 45–49	4–4 (0–3)	Iowa Field House; Iowa City, IA
1/12/1942		Chicago	W 56–24	5–4 (1–3)	UW Fieldhouse; Madison, Wisconsin
1/17/1942		vs. Northwestern	W 49–46	6–4 (2–3)	Chicago Stadium; Chicago
1/19/1942		Michigan	W 58–36	7–4 (3–3)	UW Fieldhouse; Madison, Wisconsin
1/24/1942		Indiana	W 42–36	8–4 (4–3)	UW Fieldhouse; Madison, Wisconsin
2/07/1942*		Great Lakes (IL)	L 42–47	8–5	UW Fieldhouse; Madison, Wisconsin
2/09/1942		at Chicago	W 54–20	9–5 (5–3)	Henry Crown Field House; Chicago
2/14/1942		Ohio State	W 49–39	10–5 (6–3)	UW Fieldhouse; Madison, Wisconsin
2/16/1942		at Purdue	L 34–40	10–6 (6–4)	Lambert Fieldhouse; West Lafayette, Indiana
2/21/1942		Northwestern	W 59–47	11–6 (7–4)	UW Fieldhouse; Madison, Wisconsin
2/23/1942		at Illinois	L 43–45	11–7 (7–5)	Huff Hall; Champaign, Illinois
2/28/1942		at Ohio State	W 44–39	12–7 (8–5)	Ohio Expo Center Coliseum; Columbus, Ohio
3/02/1942		at Minnesota	W 49–47	13–7 (9–5)	Minnesota Field House; Minneapolis
3/07/1942		Iowa	W 62–45	14–7 (10–5)	UW Fieldhouse; Madison, Wisconsin
*Non-conference game. ^{#}Rankings from AP Poll. (#) Tournament seedings in parentheses.
