= 1941–42 Michigan Wolverines men's basketball team =

American college basketball season

1941–42 Michigan Wolverines men's basketball
- Conference: Big Ten Conference
- Record: 6–14 (5–10 Big Ten)
- Head coach: Bennie Oosterbaan
- Captain: William Cartmill
- Home arena: Yost Field House

1941–42 Big Ten Conference men's basketball standings
	Conf.				Overall
Team	W		L	PCT	W		L	PCT
Illinois	13	–	2	.867	18	–	5	.783
Indiana	10	–	5	.667	15	–	6	.714
Wisconsin	10	–	5	.667	14	–	7	.667
Iowa	10	–	5	.667	12	–	8	.600
Minnesota	9	–	6	.600	15	–	6	.714
Purdue	9	–	6	.600	14	–	7	.667
Northwestern	5	–	10	.333	8	–	13	.381
Michigan	5	–	10	.333	6	–	14	.300
Ohio State	4	–	11	.267	6	–	14	.300
Chicago	0	–	15	.000	1	–	20	.048

The 1941–42 Michigan Wolverines men's basketball team represented the University of Michigan in intercollegiate basketball during the 1941–42 season. The team finished the season in a tie for seventh place in the Big Ten Conference with an overall record of 6–14 and 5–10 against conference opponents.

Bennie Oosterbaan was in his fourth year as the team's head coach. James Mandler broke Michigan's single-season scoring record with 230 points in 20 games for an average of 11.5 points per game. William Cartmill was the team captain.

== Statistical leaders ==
Player	Pos.	Yr	G	FG	FT	RB	Pts	PPG
James Mandler			20	91	48		230	11.5
William Cartmill			20	48	25		121	6.1
Leo Doyle			18	42	29		113	6.3
Melvin Comin			20	26	16		68	3.4
Donald Holman			7	19	13		51	7.3
Robert Antle			14	14	14		42	3.0
Totals			20	291	185		767	38.4
