= 1942 SEC men's basketball tournament =

- Classification: Division I
- Teams: 12
- Site: Jefferson County Armory; Louisville, Kentucky
- Champions: Kentucky (5th title)
- Winning coach: Adolph Rupp (5th title)

1941–42 Southeastern Conference men's basketball standings
	Conf.				Overall
Team	W		L	PCT	W		L	PCT
Tennessee	7	–	1	.875	19	–	3	.864
Alabama	13	–	4	.765	18	–	6	.750
Kentucky †	6	–	2	.750	19	–	6	.760
LSU	8	–	3	.727	8	–	7	.533
Auburn	9	–	5	.643	11	–	6	.647
Mississippi State	9	–	6	.600	13	–	7	.650
Georgia	5	–	8	.385	7	–	10	.412
Georgia Tech	4	–	7	.364	8	–	8	.500
Florida	3	–	8	.273	8	–	9	.471
Vanderbilt	3	–	8	.273	7	–	9	.438
Tulane	3	–	9	.250	4	–	12	.250
Ole Miss	3	–	12	.200	4	–	15	.211
† Regular-season championship and SEC Tournament winner

The 1942 Southeastern Conference men's basketball tournament took place on February 26–28, 1942, in Louisville, Kentucky at the Jefferson County Armory. It was the ninth SEC basketball tournament.

Kentucky won the tournament by beating Tennessee in the championship game. The Wildcats would go on to play in the 1942 NCAA tournament earning the first invitation for an SEC team. They would lose to Dartmouth in the semifinals.

== Bracket ==
First Round
Alabama	37
Georgia Tech	32
Tennessee	62
Georgia	50
Auburn	36
Vanderbilt	34
Kentucky	42
Florida	36

Quarterfinals
LSU	31^{OT}
Alabama	45
Mississippi State	40
Tennessee	50
Tulane	36
Auburn	45
Ole Miss	32
Kentucky	59

Semifinals
Alabama	21
Tennessee	18
Auburn	31
Kentucky	40

Finals
Alabama	34
Kentucky	36
