= Andy Zimmer =

American basketball player

Andrew M. Zimmer (October 9, 1919 – December 20, 2005) was an American basketball player. He was an NCAA All-American at Indiana University and played on the school's first championship team in 1940.

Zimmer, a 6'5" center from Goodland High School in Goodland, Indiana, played for coach Branch McCracken at Indiana from 1939 to 1942. Zimmer came to the Hoosiers as a walk-on, but improved to the point where he was named a third team All-American by Converse in 1942.

Following his college career, Zimmer served in the United States Marine Corps between 1942 and 1969. He retired as a colonel, having received the Purple Heart and Bronze Star while serving in World War II and the Korean War.

Andy Zimmer was inducted into the Indiana Basketball Hall of Fame in 1999. He died on December 20, 2005, and was buried in Arlington National Cemetery with full military honors.
