= 1941–42 Kansas Jayhawks men's basketball team =

American college basketball season

1941–42 Kansas Jayhawks men's basketball

Big Six Co-Champions

NCAA tournament, Third place
- Conference: Big Six Conference
- Record: 17–5 (8–2 Big 6)
- Head coach: Phog Allen (25th season)
- Captain: Ralph Miller
- Home arena: Hoch Auditorium

1941–42 Big Six Conference men's basketball standings
	Conf.				Overall
Team	W		L	PCT	W		L	PCT
Kansas	8	–	2	.800	17	–	5	.773
Oklahoma	8	–	2	.800	11	–	7	.611
Iowa State	5	–	5	.500	11	–	6	.647
Nebraska	4	–	6	.400	6	–	13	.316
Kansas State	3	–	7	.300	8	–	10	.444
Missouri	2	–	8	.200	6	–	12	.333

The 1941–42 Kansas Jayhawks men's basketball team represented the University of Kansas during the 1941–42 college men's basketball season. Politician Bob Dole was a member of the team.

== Roster ==
- Charles B. Black
- Jack Ballard
- Donald Blair
- John Buescher
- George Dick
- Bob Dole
- Ray Evans
- Wilson Fitzpatrick
- Vance Hall
- Thomas Hunter
- Warren Israel
- Bob Johnson
- Max Kissell
- Ralph Miller
- Richard Miller
- Marvin Sollenberger
- Paul Turner
- Hubert Ulrich
- Charles Walker

== Schedule ==
Date time, TV	Rank^{#}	Opponent^{#}	Result	Record	Site city, state
December 17*		Denver	W 36–35	1-0	Hoch Auditorium; Lawrence, KS
December 18*		at Bethel	W 61–28	2-0	Robertson Center Gym; Newton, KS
January 6		Oklahoma	W 54–32	3-0 (1-0)	Hoch Auditorium; Lawrence, KS
January 14		at Missouri; Border War	W 48–34	4-0 (2-0)	Brewer Fieldhouse; Columbia, MO
January 17		at Nebraska	W 51–32	5-0 (3-0)	Nebraska Coliseum; Lincoln, NE
January 19		at Iowa State	L 41–45	5-1 (3-1)	State Gymnasium; Ames, IA
January 24		Kansas State; Sunflower Showdown	W 46–44	6-1 (4-1)	Hoch Auditorium; Lawrence, KS
January 29*		at Iowa	W 53–51	7-1	Iowa Field House; Iowa City, IA
January 31*		at DePaul	W 46–26	8-1	University Auditorium; Chicago, IL
February 2*		at Wichita	W 56–37	9-1	Henrion Gymnasium; Wichita, KS
February 5*		vs. Great Lakes NTS	L 37–53	9-2	Municipal Auditorium; Kansas City, MO
February 10*		Creighton	W 53–49	10-2	Hoch Auditorium; Lawrence, KS
February 14		Nebraska	W 58–30	11-2 (5-1)	Hoch Auditorium; Lawrence, KS
January 16		Iowa State	W 60–44	12-2 (6-1)	Hoch Auditorium; Lawrence, KS
February 20*		Oklahoma A&M	W 31–28	13-2	Hoch Auditorium; Lawrence, KS
February 25*		at Oklahoma A&M	L 33–40	13-3	Gallagher-Iba Arena; Stillwater, OK
February 27		at Oklahoma	L 51–63	13-4 (6-2)	Field House; Norman, OK
March 3		at Kansas State; Sunflower Showdown	W 45–26	14-4 (7-2)	Nichols Hall; Manhattan, KS
March 6		Missouri; Border War	W 67–44	15-4 (8-2)	Hoch Auditorium; Lawrence, KS
March 17*		Oklahoma A&M	W 32–28	16-4	Hoch Auditorium; Lawrence, KS
March 20*		vs. Colorado; NCAA Regional semifinals	L 44–46	16-5	Municipal Auditorium; Kansas City, MO
March 21*		vs. Rice; NCAA Regional Third Place	W 55–53	17-5	Municipal Auditorium; Kansas City, MO
*Non-conference game. ^{#}Rankings from AP Poll. (#) Tournament seedings in parentheses.
