= 1941–42 Duke Blue Devils men's basketball team =

American college basketball season

1941–42 Duke Blue Devils men's basketball

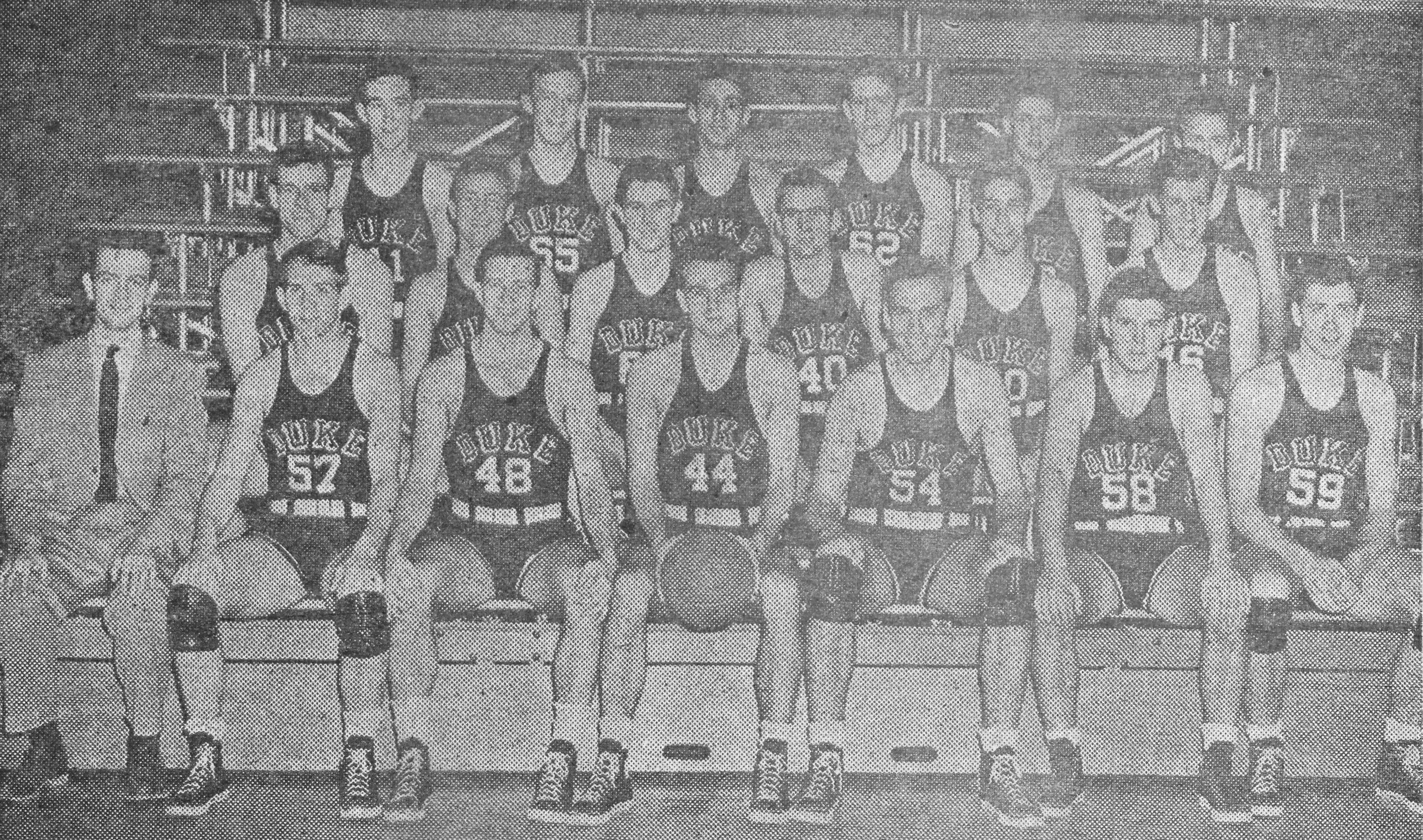

SoCon Regular Season champions SoCon Tournament champions
- Conference: Southern Conference
- Record: 22–2 (15–1 Southern)
- Head coach: Eddie Cameron
- Home arena: Duke Indoor Stadium

1941–42 Southern Conference men's basketball standings
	Conf.				Overall
Team	W		L	PCT	W		L	PCT
Duke †	15	–	1	.938	22	–	2	.917
George Washington	8	–	3	.727	11	–	9	.550
Wake Forest	13	–	5	.722	16	–	8	.667
North Carolina State	9	–	4	.692	15	–	7	.682
William & Mary	8	–	4	.667	15	–	9	.625
South Carolina	8	–	4	.667	12	–	9	.571
North Carolina	9	–	5	.643	14	–	9	.609
Washington and Lee	7	–	7	.500	10	–	15	.400
Furman	7	–	8	.467	10	–	9	.526
Richmond	4	–	8	.333	9	–	9	.500
Virginia Tech	4	–	8	.333	10	–	10	.500
VMI	5	–	10	.333	7	–	11	.389
Maryland	3	–	8	.273	7	–	15	.318
Davidson	3	–	9	.250	12	–	13	.480
Clemson	2	–	10	.167	3	–	14	.176
The Citadel	1	–	12	.077	2	–	14	.125
† Southern Conference Tournament winner

The 1941–42 Duke Blue Devils men's basketball team represented Duke University during the 1941–42 men's college basketball season. The head coach was Eddie Cameron, coaching his 14th and final season with the Blue Devils. The team finished with an overall record of 22–2.
