= 1942 Southern Conference men's basketball tournament =

- Classification: Division I
- Teams: 8
- Site: Thompson Gym; Raleigh, NC
- Champions: Duke (3rd title)
- Winning coach: Eddie Cameron (3rd title)

1941–42 Southern Conference men's basketball standings
	Conf.				Overall
Team	W		L	PCT	W		L	PCT
Duke †	15	–	1	.938	22	–	2	.917
George Washington	8	–	3	.727	11	–	9	.550
Wake Forest	13	–	5	.722	16	–	8	.667
North Carolina State	9	–	4	.692	15	–	7	.682
William & Mary	8	–	4	.667	15	–	9	.625
South Carolina	8	–	4	.667	12	–	9	.571
North Carolina	9	–	5	.643	14	–	9	.609
Washington and Lee	7	–	7	.500	10	–	15	.400
Furman	7	–	8	.467	10	–	9	.526
Richmond	4	–	8	.333	9	–	9	.500
Virginia Tech	4	–	8	.333	10	–	10	.500
VMI	5	–	10	.333	7	–	11	.389
Maryland	3	–	8	.273	7	–	15	.318
Davidson	3	–	9	.250	12	–	13	.480
Clemson	2	–	10	.167	3	–	14	.176
The Citadel	1	–	12	.077	2	–	14	.125
† Southern Conference Tournament winner

The 1942 Southern Conference men's basketball tournament took place from March 5–7, 1942 at Thompson Gym in Raleigh, North Carolina. The Duke Blue Devils won their third Southern Conference title, led by head coach Eddie Cameron.

== Format ==
The top eight finishers of the conference's sixteen members were eligible for the tournament. Teams were seeded based on conference winning percentage. The tournament used a preset bracket consisting of three rounds.

== Bracket ==
Quarterfinals; March 5
Duke	59
Washington and Lee	41
Wake Forest	32
North Carolina	26
NC State	56
South Carolina	43
George Washington	43
William & Mary	44

Semifinals; March 6
Duke	54
Wake Forest	45
NC State	53
William & Mary	52

Finals; March 7
Duke	45
NC State	34

* Overtime game

== See also ==
- List of Southern Conference men's basketball champions
