= 1941–42 Holy Cross Crusaders men's basketball team =

American college basketball season

1941–42 Holy Cross Crusaders men's basketball
- Conference: Independent
- Record: 5–4
- Head coach: Ed Krause (3rd season)
- Captain: Richard Hamilton
- Home arena: N/A

The 1941–42 Holy Cross Crusaders men's basketball team represented The College of the Holy Cross during the 1941–42 NCAA men's basketball season. The head coach was Ed Krause, coaching the crusaders in his third season.

== Schedule ==
Date time, TV	Opponent	Result	Record	Site city, state
1/14/1942*	Clark	W 55–39	1–0	Worcester, MA
1/24/1942*	at Brown	W 47–45	2–0	Marvel Gymnasium; Providence, RI
2/06/1942*	at Fordham	L 49–54	2–1	Rose Hill Gymnasium; Bronx, NY
2/07/1942*	at St. Peter's	W 44–36	3–1	Jersey City Armory; Jersey City, NJ
2/14/1942*	at Amherst	W 40–37	4–1	Amherst, MA
2/16/1942*	at Rhode Island	L 56–62	4–2	Rodman Hall; Providence, RI
2/21/1942*	at Seton Hall	L 38–51	4–3	Walsh Gymnasium; South Orange, NJ
2/25/1942*	Dartmouth	L 44–58	4–4	Alumni Gym; Hanover, NH
3/03/1942*	at Providence	W 54–46	5–4	Providence, RI
*Non-conference game. (#) Tournament seedings in parentheses.
