= Arthur R. Winters =

Biographical details
- Born: 1900; Horton, Kansas, U.S.
- Died: May 9, 1981 (aged 81); Allentown, Pennsylvania, U.S.
- Education: Oberlin (1923)

Coaching career (HC unless noted)

Football
- 1927–1940: Hamilton

Basketball
- 1942–1945: Lafayette

Track
- 1923–1927: Case
- 1927–1941: Hamilton
- 1942–1966: Lafayette

Administrative career (AD unless noted)
- 1960–1965: Lafayette

Head coaching record
- Overall: 41–50–12 (football); 30–11 (basketball)

Arthur R. Winters Sr. (1900 – May 9, 1981) was an American football, basketball, and track and field coach and college athletics administrator. He served as the head football coach at Hamilton College in Clinton, New York from 1927 to 1940, compiling a record of 41–50–12. He was head basketball coach at Lafayette College in Easton, Pennsylvania from 1942 to 1945 and school's head track coach from 1942 to 1966. He also served as the athletic director at Lafayette from 1960 to 1965. Winters was born in Horton, Kansas. He died on May 9, 1981, in Allentown, Pennsylvania.

== Head coaching record ==
=== Football ===
Year	Team	Overall	Conference	Standing	Bowl/playoffs
Hamilton Continentals (New York State Conference) (1927–1934)
1927	Hamilton	3–4–1			
1928	Hamilton	5–2–1	2–0–1	3rd	
1929	Hamilton	4–3–1			
1930	Hamilton	3–3–2			
1931	Hamilton	3–4–1			
1932	Hamilton	2–3–2			
1933	Hamilton	6–1			
1934	Hamilton	3–3–1			
Hamilton Continentals (Independent) (1935–1940)
1935	Hamilton	4–3			
1936	Hamilton	2–5			
1937	Hamilton	3–3–1			
1938	Hamilton	0–6–1			
1939	Hamilton	1–5–1			
1940	Hamilton	2–5			
Hamilton:		41–50–12			
Total:		41–50–12			
