= The Rocky Mountain Collegian =

Student newspaper of Colorado State University

- Type: Student newspaper
- Format: Berliner
- Owner: Rocky Mountain Student Media Corp.
- Editor: Allie Seibel
- Founded: 1891
- Headquarters: Fort Collins, Colorado
- Circulation: 3,000
- Website: collegian.com

The Rocky Mountain Collegian is the daily student newspaper of Colorado State University. Founded in 1891, the paper is one of the oldest daily student newspapers west of the Mississippi River and is the only student-run daily newspaper in the state of Colorado. In 2010, the Collegian was ranked one of the top three daily student newspapers in the nation by the Society of Professional Journalists.

The publication is not an official publication of Colorado State University, but is published by the independent 501(c)3 non-profit Rocky Mountain Student Media Corporation using the name The Rocky Mountain Collegian pursuant to a license granted by CSU. The Rocky Mountain Collegian is a 3,000-circulation student-run newspaper intended as a public forum. It publishes digitally four days a week, Monday through Thursday, and in print each Thursday. During the regular fall and spring semesters breaking news and sports coverage is occasionally published on Fridays, Saturday and Sundays. The Collegian is a complimentary publication for the Fort Collins community. The first copy is free. Additional copies are 25 cents each.

The Collegian won the Silver Crown Award from the Columbia Scholastic Press Association for its work in the fall semester of 2008. Its investigative team has received both the Robert Novak Collegiate Journalism Award and its writers have received numerous college journalism accolades throughout the years.

The Rocky Mountain Collegian is an affiliate of UWIRE, which distributes and promotes its content to their network.

== Controversy ==
On September 21, 2007, the paper's editorial board ran the words "Taser This... Fuck Bush" in large bold font as an editorial. Members of the board stated that the editorial was a response to the University of Florida Taser incident, which had occurred earlier that week. Then-President Larry Penley responded: "While student journalists enjoy all the privileges and protections of the first amendment, they must also accept full responsibility for the choices they make. Members of a university community ought to be expected to communicate civilly and rationally and to make thoughtful arguments in support of even unpopular viewpoints." Community members and the campus' College Republicans called upon Colorado State University's Board of Student Communications to dismiss Editor-in-chief J. David McSwane, who had final say in all matters of editorial content. After a heated public hearing and a closed-door meeting with witnesses, the board chose only to admonish McSwane for violation of two guidelines in the university's student media code: use of profane language in an editorial and using poor judgment in framing the editorial.

The university and Penley were not finished scrutinizing the Collegian, however. Penley began private conversations with the local, Gannett-owned newspaper, The Fort Collins Coloradoan, so that the Coloradoan would enter a "strategic partnership" with the Collegian and run it as part of the for-profit Gannett chain. Student-journalists caught wind of a January 2008 meeting between Penley and then-Coloradoan Publisher Christine Chin, and showed up uninvited and unannounced to voice their displeasure. They were turned away.

"This takes privatization in a whole new direction and threatens the very core of student press freedom on that campus," wrote Kathy Lawrence, director of student media at the University of Texas-Austin, and a former College Media Association president. "Everyone who cares about an independent student press needs to sound the alarm loudly."

Penley and the university released a statement on January 23, 2008, and announced that CSU would accept a formal proposal from Gannett for their "partnership." The university in February 2008 formed an "advisory committee" to review the structure of the Collegian and to review proposals from Gannett and other interested suitors. The proposal offer was eventually extended to other corporate entities and to the then-Department of Student Media, which had been running the Collegian's business affairs — as well as those of CTV, KCSU-FM radio and College Avenue magazine. University officials eventually accepted a proposal by Student Media Director Jeff Browne, that would create a non-profit media company working through a contract with CSU, to provide media services and news to the student body and to the community. The university's Board of Governors adopted the plan in May 2008, and the Rocky Mountain Student Media Corporation began operations that summer.

Larry Penley's term as CSU president ended abruptly in November 2008 with his resignation under fire. A Colorado Independent investigation uncovered Penley's questionable handling of money, including shifting money away from academic colleges and the library and into athletic department coffers, and the tripling of his own office's budget.

== Editorial Staff, 2025-26 ==
Editor-in-Chief: Allie Seibel

Managing Editor: Hannah Parcells

Executive Editor: Claire Vogl

Copy Chief: Willow Engle

News Editor: Sam Hutton

News Editor: Chloe Waskey

Sports Editor: Michael Hovey

Sports Editor: Sophie Webb

Life and Culture Editor: Aubree Miller

Arts and Entertainment Editor: Ruby Secrest

Science Editor: Katie Fisher

Opinion Editor: Emma Souza

Photo Director: Cait Mckinzie

Assistant Photo Director: Sofia Raikow

Illustration Director: Alli Adams

Print Director: Nathan Carmody

Director of Digital Strategy and Engagement: Gigi Young

Social Media Director: Isabella Trinchero
